= 1957 Men's British Open Squash Championship =

British Open Squash Championships
- 19th British Open Championships

Details
- Location: London, England
- Venue: Lansdowne Club

The 1957 Open Championship was held at the Lansdowne Club in London from 20 March – 25 March.
Roshan Khan won the title defeating Hashim Khan in the final. This was the first ever defeat for Hashim Khan in the open championships.

Another Khan appeared, this time in the form of 17-year-old Mo Khan, nephew of Hashim Khan and Azam Khan.

== Seeds ==
(Pakistan) Hashim Khan

(Pakistan) Roshan Khan

(Pakistan) Azam Khan

== Results ==
First round
(Pakistan) Hashim Khan ^	9	9	9
16	(India) S J S Lam +	3	0	0
(England) Jack Giles	9	9	7	9
(England) P M H Robinson +	3	6	9	2
(Pakistan) Azam Khan ^	9	9	9
(England) Terry Pickering +	0	0	0
(England) Richard Hawkey +	9	10	9
(England) Richard Boddington +	6	9	4
(Pakistan) Roshan Khan ^	9	9	9
(Pakistan) Khan Din	3	4	5
(England) Mike Perkins +	10	9	9
(England) W D N Vaughan +	8	7	7
(Pakistan) Mo Khan	9	9	9
(India) Jamal Din	6	7	2
(Wales) Denis Hughes +	9	9	9
(Pakistan) M Amin	7	1	2

Quarterfinals
(Pakistan) Hashim Khan	9	9	10
(England) Giles	5	2	8
(Pakistan) Azam Khan	9	9	9
(England) Richard Hawkey	0	3	2
(Pakistan) Roshan Khan	1	9	9	9
(England) Perkins	9	4	1	4
(Pakistan) Mo Khan	9	9	9
(Wales) Hughes	5	0	2

Semifinals
(Pakistan) Hashim Khan	9	4	9	9
(Pakistan) Azam Khan	4	9	6	5
(Pakistan) Roshan Khan	10	9	9
(Pakistan) Mo Khan	8	0	5

Final
(Pakistan) Hashim Khan	9	5	2	1
(Pakistan) Roshan Khan	6	9	9	9

+ amateur
^ seeded

Preceded by 1956	British Open Squash Championships; England (London); 1957	Succeeded by 1958
