= 1960 Men's British Open Squash Championship =

British Open Squash Championships
- 22nd British Open Championships

Details
- Location: London, England
- Venue: Royal Automobile Club

The 1960 Open Championship was held at the Royal Automobile Club in Pall Mall, London from 2–7 December 1959.
The Open championship was moved to December to avoid a clash with the professional championship. However to confuse matters instead of waiting until December 1960 the authorities decided to hold the tournament in December 1959 despite the fact that it had already been held in March 1959.
Azam Khan retained his title beating Roshan Khan in final. Roshan slipped in the second rally of the final hurting himself, he played well until 4-1 behind in the first game but then faded very badly and could not move fluently which led to Azam going through the motions of wrapping up the easy victory.

== Seeds ==
(Pakistan) Azam Khan

(Pakistan) Mo Khan
(Pakistan) Roshan Khan
(Pakistan) Hashim Khan
(Scotland) Mike Oddy
(Egypt) Ibrahim Amin

(Egypt) Dardir El Bakary

== Draw and results ==
=== Section 1 ===
First round
(Pakistan) Azam Khan ^
bye
(England) Richard Hawkey +
bye
(Egypt) Dardir El Bakary ^
bye
(South Africa) Kendal Jarvis +
bye
(Pakistan) Nasrullah Khan	9	9	9
(England) Jeremy Lyon +	1	0	7
(Pakistan) Khan Din	10	1	9	0	9
(Egypt) Tewfik Shafik ^ +	9	9	1	9	3
bye
(Pakistan) Hashim Khan ^
bye
(Wales) Denis Hughes +

Second round
(Pakistan) Azam Khan	9	9	9
(England) Richard Hawkey	1	7	0
(Egypt) El Bakary	9	9	9
(South Africa) Jarvis	4	2	6
(Pakistan) Nasrullah Khan	3	10	9	9
(Pakistan) Khan Din	9	9	5	4
(Pakistan) Hashim Khan	6	9	9	9
(Wales) Hughes	9	4	3	6

Quarter finals
(Pakistan) Azam Khan	9	9	9
(Egypt) El Bakary	2	5	2
(Pakistan) Nasrullah Khan	6	5	6
(Pakistan) Hashim Khan	9	9	9

Semi finals
(Pakistan) Azam Khan	9	5	9	9
(Pakistan) Hashim Khan	5	9	6	6

=== Section 2 ===
First round
(Pakistan) Roshan Khan ^
bye
(England) Terry Pickering
bye
(India) Jamal Din
bye	2	3	4
(Egypt) Ibrahim Amin ^ +
bye
(Scotland) Mike Oddy ^ +	9	9	9
(Pakistan) Ali Akbar Khan	2	3	4
(England) D W Harman	3	9	9	9
(England) W J Moss	9	7	4	0
(Pakistan) Mo Khan ^
bye
(Pakistan) Hanif Khan
bye

Second round
(Pakistan) Roshan Khan	9	9	9
(England) Pickering	2	6	4
(India) Jamal Din	9	6	9	9
(Egypt) Amin	2	9	4	4
(Scotland) Oddy	9	9	9
(England) Harman	2	2	3
(Pakistan) Mo Khan	9	9	9
(Pakistan) Hanif Khan	3	2	2

Quarter round
(Pakistan) Roshan Khan	9	9	2	9
(India) Jamal Din	7	4	9	7
(Scotland) Oddy	9	6	9	9
(Pakistan) Mo Khan	3	9	3	0

Semi finals
(Pakistan) Roshan Khan	6	9	9	9
(Scotland) Oddy	9	6	2	3

+ amateur
^ seeded

== Semi-finals & Final ==
Semi-finals
(Pakistan) Azam Khan	9	5	9	9
(Pakistan) Hashim Khan	6	9	6	6
(Pakistan) Roshan Khan	6	9	9	9
(Scotland) Mike Oddy	9	6	2	3

Final
(Pakistan) Azam Khan	9	9	9
(Pakistan) Roshan Khan	1	0	0

Preceded by 1959	British Open Squash Championships; England (London); 1960	Succeeded by 1961
