= 1950 Men's British Open Squash Championship =

British Open Squash Championships
- 12th British Open Championships

Details
- Location: London, England
- Venue: Lansdowne Club

The 1950 Open Championship was held at the Lansdowne Club in London from 13 to 17 April. Mahmoud Karim won his fourth consecutive title defeating Abdul Bari in the final.

== Seeds ==
(Egypt) Mahmoud Karim

(India) Abdul Bari
(Australia) Gordon Watson

(England) Jim Dear

== Results ==
First round
(Egypt) Mahmoud Karim ^	9	9	9
16	(England) Jack Giles	2	5	5
(England) LtCdr Alan Seymour-Haydon	9	9	9
(England) G J Reece	2	7	1
(England) Jim Dear ^	9	9	9
(England) Roy Wilson +	2	4	1
(England) Brian Phillips	9	9	9
(England) W E Clements	7	6	6
(India) Abdul Bari ^	9	10	9
(England) Peter Phillips	1	8	3
(Scotland) William 'Doug' McLaggan	9	9	2	9
(England) Bert Biddle	7	5	9	6
(Australia) Gordon Watson ^	9	6	9	9
(England) E S Hawes	1	9	0	4
(England) W E J Gordon	9	9	9
(England) Leslie Keeble	1	6	3

Quarterfinals
(Egypt) Karim	8	9	9	9
(England) Seymour-Hayden	10	5	2	6
(England) Dear	9	9	9
(England) Phillips	0	0	3
(India) Bari	9	9	9
(Scotland) McLaggan	2	2	1
(Australia) Watson	9	9	7	10
(England) Gordon	1	7	9	9

Semifinals
(Egypt) Karim	9	9	10
(England) Dear	0	6	8
(India) Bari	9	9	10
(Australia) Watson	2	2	8

Final
(Egypt) Karim	9	9	9
(India) Bari	4	2	7

+ amateur
^ seeded

Preceded by 1949	British Open Squash Championships; England (London); 1950	Succeeded by 1951
