= 1954 Men's British Open Squash Championship =

British Open Squash Championships
- 16th British Open Championships

Details
- Location: London, England
- Venue: Lansdowne Club

The 1954 Open Championship was held at the Lansdowne Club in London from 24 March – 29 March. Hashim Khan won his fourth consecutive title defeating his younger brother Azam Khan in the final.

== Seeds ==
(Pakistan) Hashim Khan

Azam Khan
(England) Roy Wilson

(England) Alan Fairbairn

== Results ==
First round
(Pakistan) Hashim Khan ^	9	9	9
16	(Iran) Matthew Farhang Mohtadi +	4	2	3
(England) Jack Giles	9	9	9
(England) W J Ashford	5	7	5
(India) Abdul Bari	9	3	9	9
(Wales) Denis Hughes +	3	9	1	4
(England) Alan Fairbairn ^ +	9	10	9
(England) Leslie Keeble	4	8	2
(Pakistan) Azam Khan	9	9	9
(England) Roy Wilson ^ +	0	5	0
(Scotland) Ian de Sales la Terriere +	10	9	9
(Scotland) D W D Shaw +	9	7	5
(Pakistan) Roshan Khan	9	9	9
(England) Richard Hawkey +	2	5	4
(England) Sir Charles McLeod +	9	9	7	3	10
(England) Peter Doggart +	5	6	9	9	8

Quarterfinals
(Pakistan) Hashim Khan	9	9	9
(England) Giles	1	2	4
(India) Abdul Bari	6	9	9	9	9
(England) Fairbairn	9	3	2	10	7
(Pakistan) Azam Khan	9	7	9	9
(Scotland) Le Terriere	1	9	2	2
(Pakistan) Roshan Khan	9	9	9
(England) McLeod	3	3	6

Semifinals
(Pakistan) Hashim Khan	w/o
(India) Abdul Bari	scr
(Pakistan) Azam Khan	9	2	10	9
(Pakistan) Roshan Khan	6	9	8	3

Final
(Pakistan) Hashim Khan	6	9	9	7	9
(Pakistan) Azam Khan	9	6	6	9	5

+ amateur
^ seeded

Preceded by 1953	British Open Squash Championships; England (London); 1954	Succeeded by 1955
