= 1953 Men's British Open Squash Championship =

British Open Squash Championships
- 15th British Open Championships

Details
- Location: London, England
- Venue: Lansdowne Club

The 1953 Open Championship was held at the Lansdowne Club in London from 25 March – 2 April. Hashim Khan won his third consecutive title defeating Roy Wilson in the final.

Azam Khan the younger brother of Hashim Khan made his first appearance at the tournament.

== Seeds ==
(Pakistan) Hashim Khan

(Egypt) Mahmoud Karim
(England) Roy Wilson

(England) Alan Fairbairn

== Results ==
First round
(Pakistan) Hashim Khan ^	9	9	9
16	(Scotland) Ian de Sales la Terriere +	5	0	5
(England) Jack Giles	9	9	9
(Wales) H G Davies	1	7	1
(Pakistan) Azam Khan	9	9	9
(England) Alan Fairbairn + ^	2	6	3
(England) Alan Seymour-Hayden +	9	9	9
(England) Leslie Keeble	6	4	6
(England) Roy Wilson ^ +	9	10	9
(Scotland) D W D Shaw +	7	9	2
(India) Abdul Bari	9	9	9
(Iran) Matthew Farhang Mohtadi	7	3	5
(Pakistan) Safirullah Khan	9	10	2	10
(England) Peter Doggart +	2	9	9	8
(Egypt) Mahmoud Karim ^	8	10	9	10
(South Africa) Dr Gavin Hildick-Smith	10	8	4	8

Quarterfinals
(Pakistan) Hashim Khan	9	9	9
(England) Giles	4	5	3
(Pakistan) Azam Khan	w/o
(England) Seymour-Haydon	scr
(India) Abdul Bari	9	1	2	9	2
(England) Wilson	2	9	9	1	9
(Pakistan) Safirullah Khan	w/o
(Egypt) Mahmoud Karim	scr

Semifinals
(Pakistan) Hashim Khan	9	4	9	8	9
(Pakistan) Azam Khan	6	9	7	10	4
(England) Wilson	1	9	9	9
(Pakistan) Safirullah Khan	9	7	3	4

Final
(Pakistan) Hashim Khan	9	8	9	9
(England) Wilson	2	10	1	0

+ amateur
^ seeded

Preceded by 1952	British Open Squash Championships; England (London); 1953	Succeeded by 1954
