= 1956 Men's British Open Squash Championship =

British Open Squash Championships
- 18th British Open Championships

Details
- Location: London, England
- Venue: Lansdowne Club

The 1956 Open Championship was held at the Lansdowne Club in London from 21 March – 26 March. Hashim Khan won his sixth consecutive title defeating Roshan Khan in the final.

Hashim Khan set a new record by winning a sixth title overtaking the previous record set by F.D. Amr Bey

== Seeds ==
(Pakistan) Hashim Khan

(Pakistan) Azam Khan

(Pakistan) Roshan Khan

== Results ==
First round
(Pakistan) Hashim Khan ^	9	9	9
16	(England) Peter Phillips +	2	0	3
(India) Jamal Din	9	9	9
(England) Nigel Broomfield +	3	3	2
(Pakistan) Azam Khan ^	9	9	9
(Wales) Denis Hughes +	6	0	1
(India) S J S Lam +	9	9	7	9
(England) P M H Robinson +	7	7	9	4
(Pakistan) Roshan Khan ^	9	9	9
(Rhodesia) David Hodgson +	1	1	0
(Egypt) Dardir El Bakary	9	9	9
(Iran) Matthew Farhang Mohtadi	3	1	6
(England) Richard Hawkey +	9	9	9
(England) D W Harman	7	5	3
(England) Jack Giles	10	9	9
(Australia) Brian Boys +	8	5	3

Quarterfinals
(Pakistan) Hashim Khan	9	10	7	9
(India) Jamal Din	4	9	9	5
(Pakistan) Azam Khan	9	9	9
(India) Lam	0	1	0
(Pakistan) Roshan Khan	9	9	9
(Egypt) El Bakary	2	6	2
(England) Richard Hawkey	9	2	8	9	9
(England) Giles	1	9	10	7	0

Semifinals
(Pakistan) Hashim Khan	10	10	4	9
(Pakistan) Azam Khan	9	9	9	3
(Pakistan) Roshan Khan	9	9	9
(England) Richard Hawkey	1	2	0

Final
(Pakistan) Hashim Khan	9	9	5	9
(Pakistan) Roshan Khan	4	2	9	5

+ amateur
^ seeded

Preceded by 1955	British Open Squash Championships; England (London); 1956	Succeeded by 1957
