= 1959 Men's British Open Squash Championship =

British Open Squash Championships
- 21st British Open Championships

Details
- Location: London, England
- Venue: Royal Automobile Club

The 1959 Open Championship was held at the Royal Automobile Club in Pall Mall, London from 11 March – 16 March.
Azam Khan finally won his first title after finishing runner-up to his older brother Hashim Khan on three previous occasions. He defeated Mo Khan in the final.

Defending champion and top seed Hashim Khan had withdrawn from the Championships after ankle problems and another seed Roshan Khan had been recalled to service by the Pakistan navy.

== Seeds ==
(Pakistan) Azam Khan
(Pakistan) Mo Khan

== Results ==
First round
(Pakistan) Azam Khan ^ | 9 | 9 | 9
16 | (Pakistan) Hanif Khan | 1 | 0 | 1
(England) W J Ashford | 9 | 9 | 9 | ret
(England) H de B Priestley + | 10 | 3 | 4
(Pakistan) Ali Akbar Khan | 9 | 10 | 9
(England) D W Harman | 5 | 8 | 4
(England) Richard Hawkey + | w/o
(England) Jack Giles | scr
(Pakistan) Mo Khan ^ | 9 | 9 | 9
(Pakistan) Khan Din | 0 | 2 | 1
(Wales) Denis Hughes + | 9 | 9 | 9
(England) R Horsey | 0 | 0 | 4
(Pakistan) Nasrullah Khan | 9 | 10 | 9
(Pakistan) J C Gordon + | 2 | 8 | 0
(India) Jamal Din | 9 | 9 | 9
(England) Jim McQueenie | 2 | 5 | 0

Quarterfinals
(Pakistan) Azam Khan | 9 | 9 | 9
(England) Ashford | 3 | 6 | 2
(Pakistan) Ali Akbar Khan | 9 | 9 | 9
(England) Richard Hawkey | 5 | 3 | 1
(Pakistan) Mo Khan | 9 | 9 | 9
(Wales) Hughes | 2 | 6 | 3
(Pakistan) Nasrullah Khan | 9 | 9 | 9
(India) Jamal Din | 7 | 4 | 2

Semifinals
(Pakistan) Azam Khan | 9 | 9 | 9
(Pakistan) Ali Akbar Khan | 1 | 1 | 1
(Pakistan) Mo Khan | 9 | 9 | 9
(Pakistan) Nasrullah Khan | 1 | 0 | 5

Final
(Pakistan) Azam Khan | 9 | 9 | 9
(Pakistan) Mo Khan | 5 | 0 | 1

+ amateur
^ seeded

| Preceded by 1958 | British Open Squash Championships; England (London); 1959 | Succeeded by 1960 |
