= 1958 Men's British Open Squash Championship =

British Open Squash Championships
- 20th British Open Championships

Details
- Location: London, England
- Venue: Lansdowne Club

The 1958 Open Championship was held at the Lansdowne Club in London from 27 March – 31 March. Hashim Khan won his seventh title to extend his record and in the final he defeated his brother Azam Khan once again.

== Results ==
First round
(Pakistan) Hashim Khan ^	9	9	9
16	(India) Jamal Din	3	4	2
(Pakistan) Nasrullah Khan	9	10	8	7	10
(Pakistan) Ali Akbar Khan	6	8	10	9	9
(Pakistan) Mo Khan ^	9	9	9
(England) Robin Lees +	4	0	2
(England) Jack Giles	9	9	9
(England) Terry Pickering +	5	2	4
(Pakistan) Azam Khan ^	9	9	9
(England) H de B Priestley +	3	3	6
(England) Richard Hawkey +	9	9	9
(England) D W Harman	1	6	3
(Wales) Denis Hughes +	w/o
(Pakistan) Khan Din	scr
(Pakistan) Yusuf Khan	9	9	9
(England) Arthur Catherine +	1	6	3

Quarterfinals
(Pakistan) Hashim Khan	9	9	9
(Pakistan) Nasrullah Khan	3	2	0
(Pakistan) Mo Khan	9	9	6	9
(England) Giles	4	3	9	3
(Pakistan) Azam Khan	9	9	9
(England) Richard Hawkey	0	0	3
(Wales) Hughes	10	3	3	9	9
(Pakistan) Yusuf Khan	8	9	9	6	4

Semifinals
(Pakistan) Hashim Khan	6	9	9	9
(Pakistan) Mo Khan	9	7	3	3
(Pakistan) Azam Khan	9	9	9
(Wales) Hughes	2	2	0

Final
(Pakistan) Hashim Khan	9	6	9	9
(Pakistan) Azam Khan	7	9	6	7

+ amateur
^ seeded

Preceded by 1957	British Open Squash Championships; England (London); 1958	Succeeded by 1959
