= 1951 Men's British Open Squash Championship =

British Open Squash Championships
- 13th British Open Championships

Details
- Location: London, England
- Venue: Lansdowne Club

The 1951 Open Championship was held at the Lansdowne Club in London from 4–9 April. Hashim Khan won his first title defeating four times champion Mahmoud Karim in the final.

== Seeds ==
(Egypt) Mahmoud Karim

(India) Abdul Bari
(Pakistan) Hashim Khan

(England) Jim Dear

== Results ==
First round
(Pakistan) Hashim Khan ^	9	9	9
16	(England) Brian Phillips	4	3	4
(England) W E J Gordon	9	1	10	9	10
(Scotland) William 'Doug' McLaggan	10	9	8	3	8
(England) Jim Dear ^	3	1	1
(South Africa) Dr Gavin Hildick-Smith +	9	9	9
(England) R M Boustead	9	2	4	9	10
(England) Jack Giles	4	9	9	6	8
(Egypt) Mahmoud Karim ^	8	9	9	9
(England) LtCol W R Howson +	10	2	6	7
(England) Leslie Keeble	9	10	9
(England) E S Hawes	7	8	1
(India) Abdul Bari ^	9	9	9
(England) Cdr Alan Seymour-Haydon	6	2	2
(England) Roy Wilson	10	9	9
(England) Peter Phillips +	9	2	6

Quarterfinals
(Pakistan) Hashim Khan	9	9	9
(England) Gordon	3	3	0
(South Africa) Hildick-Smith	9	9	9
(England) Boustead	4	5	2
(Egypt) Karim	9	9	9
(England) Keeble	4	0	1
(India) Bari	6	9	9	1	4
(England) Wilson	9	7	4	9	9

Semifinals
(Pakistan) Hashim Khan	9	9	9
(South Africa) Hildick-Smith	6	2	4
(Egypt) Karim	9	8	10	9
(England) Wilson	2	10	9	5

Final
(Pakistan) Hashim Khan	9	9	9
(Egypt) Karim	5	0	0

+ amateur
^ seeded

Preceded by 1950	British Open Squash Championships; England (London); 1951	Succeeded by 1952
