= 1955 Men's British Open Squash Championship =

British Open Squash Championships
- 17th British Open Championships

Details
- Location: London, England
- Venue: Lansdowne Club

The 1955 Open Championship was held at the Lansdowne Club in London from 23 March – 28 March. Hashim Khan won his fifth consecutive title defeating his younger brother Azam Khan in a repeat of the 1954 final. Hashim Khan equalled the record number of five wins set by F.D. Amr Bey

== Seeds ==
(Pakistan) Hashim Khan

(Pakistan) Azam Khan

(Pakistan) Roshan Khan

== Results ==
First round
(Pakistan) Hashim Khan ^	9	9	9
16	(England) Richard Hawkey +	0	3	1
(England) Jack Giles	6	9	9	9
(England) W J Moss	9	4	6	4
(Pakistan) Roshan Khan ^	9	9	9
(England) H de B Priestley +	0	0	6
(England) Alan Seymour-Haydon +	5	2	10	9	9
(India) Jamal Din	9	9	8	1	7
(Pakistan) Azam Khan ^	9	9	9
(England) W J Ashford	3	4	2
(Wales) Denis Hughes +	3	4	9	9	9
(Pakistan) Safirullah Khan	9	9	5	2	0
(England) Roy Wilson +	9	4	9	6	9
(Iran) Matthew Farhang Mohtadi +	2	9	5	9	6
(England) P M H Robinson +	0	5	10	7
(England) Peter Doggart +	9	9	8	9

Quarterfinals
(Pakistan) Hashim Khan	9	9	9
(England) Giles	4	5	4
(Pakistan) Roshan Khan	9	9	9
(England) Seymour-Hayden	1	0	4
(Pakistan) Azam Khan	9	9	9
(Wales) Hughes	4	0	3
(England) Wilson	9	9	9
(England) Doggart	7	5	2

Semifinals
(Pakistan) Hashim Khan	9	7	2	9	9
(Pakistan) Roshan Khan	2	9	9	2	5
(Pakistan) Azam Khan	9	9	9
(England) Wilson	0	1	3

Final
(Pakistan) Hashim Khan	9	7	9	5	9
(Pakistan) Azam Khan	7	9	7	9	7

+ amateur
^ seeded

Preceded by 1954	British Open Squash Championships; England (London); 1955	Succeeded by 1956
