= 1961 Men's British Open Squash Championship =

British Open Squash Championships
- 23rd British Open Championships

Details
- Location: London, England
- Venue: Royal Automobile Club

The 1961 Open Championship was held at the Royal Automobile Club in Pall Mall, London from 29 November – 4 December 1960.
Once again the Open championship was held during the previous December to avoid a clash with the professional championship. This method would be used until 1969.
Azam Khan won his third consecutive title beating Mo Khan in the final. A third place play off also took place in which Roshan Khan defeated Denis Hughes 9-3 9-0 9–3.

== Seeds ==
1. (Pakistan) Azam Khan
2. (Pakistan) Mo Khan
3. (Pakistan) Roshan Khan
4. (United Arab Republic) Dardir El Bakary

(Pakistan) Hanif Khan
(Scotland) Mike Oddy
(United Arab Republic) Ibrahim Amin

(India) Jamal Din

== Draw and results ==
=== Section 1 ===
First round
1	(Pakistan) Azam Khan
bye
(Pakistan) Gul Rehman
bye
(India) Jamal Din
bye
(England) D W Harman
bye
(Wales) Denis Hughes +	9	9	9
(Pakistan) Ali Akbar Khan	3	6	7
(Pakistan) Hanif Khan ^
bye
(United Arab Republic) Ibrahim Amin + ^	9	9	9
(England) Humphrey Truman +	7	2	6
(Rhodesia) David Hodgson +	9	9	9
(England) J C Gordon +	1	6	7

Second round
1	(Pakistan) Azam Khan	9	9	9
(Pakistan) Rehman	1	0	2
(India) Jamal Din	9	9	9
(England) Harman	3	3	2
(Wales) Hughes	8	10	9	9
(Pakistan) Hanif Khan	10	9	5	7
(United Arab Republic) Amin	9	9	9
(Rhodesia) Hodgson	1	3	2

Quarter finals
1	(Pakistan) Azam Khan	9	9	9
(India) Jamal Din	1	1	4
(Wales) Hughes	4	9	9	2	9
(United Arab Republic) Amin	9	5	6	9	4

Semi finals
1	(Pakistan) Azam Khan	9	9	9
(Wales) Hughes	0	3	2

=== Section 2 ===
First round
2	(Pakistan) Mo Khan
bye
(England) P G Harris +	8	9	9	9
(Scotland) George Chisholm +	10	5	5	5
(Scotland) Mike Oddy +	9	9	0	5	9
(United Arab Republic) Tewfik Shafik +	5	2	9	9	5
(England) Jeremy Lyon +	4	9	1	10	9
(Pakistan) Khan Din	9	3	9	8	2
3	(Pakistan) Roshan Khan
bye
(Pakistan) Nazarullah Khan
bye
(United Arab Republic) Dardir El Bakary ^
bye
(England) Richard Hawkey
bye

Second round
2	(Pakistan) Mo Khan	9	9	9
(England) Harris	3	0	0
(Scotland) Oddy	9	7	9	0	9
(England) Lyon	4	9	3	9	2
3	(Pakistan) Roshan Khan	10	9	4	9
(Pakistan) Nazarullah Khan	8	1	9	5
(United Arab Republic) El Bakary	w/o
(England) Richard Hawkey	scr

Quarter round
2	(Pakistan) Mo Khan	9	9	9
(Scotland) Oddy	4	5	7
3	(Pakistan) Roshan Khan	9	0	9	4	9
(United Arab Republic) El Bakary	2	9	6	9	2

Semi finals
2	(Pakistan) Mo Khan	9	9	9
3	(Pakistan) Roshan Khan	7	0	0

+ amateur
^ seeded

== Semi-finals & Final ==
Semi-finals
1	(Pakistan) Azam Khan	9	9	9
x	(Wales) Denis Hughes	0	3	2
2	(Pakistan) Mo Khan	9	9	9
3	(Pakistan) Roshan Khan	7	0	0

Final
1	(Pakistan) Azam Khan	6	9	9	0	9
2	(Pakistan) Mo Khan	9	1	4	9	2

Preceded by 1960	British Open Squash Championships; England (London); 1961	Succeeded by 1962
