= 1948 Men's British Open Squash Championship =

British Open Squash Championships
- 10th British Open Championships

Details
- Location: London, England
- Venue: Lansdowne Club

The 1948 Open Championship was the first time that a tournament was introduced after the challenge system was discontinued. The tournament was held at the Lansdowne Club in London from 8 to 15 March and was open to professionals and amateurs. The first winner of the competition in this format was the defending champion Mahmoud Karim who defeated Jim Dear in a close final lasting 52 minutes.

== Results ==
First round
(Egypt) Mahmoud Karim	9	9	9
(England) Alan Seymour-Haydon	4	1	5
(England) John Fisher Stokes +	9	5	5	9	9
(England) W E Clements	0	9	9	6	6
(England) Brian C. Phillips +	4	9	9	9
(England) Douglas Irvine Burnett	9	4	2	0
(England) L R Hamer	7	10	10	9
(England) G J Reece	9	9	8	6
(England) Jim Dear	9	9	9
(England) W E J Gordon	2	6	3
(England) Peter Phillips +	5	9	9	9	9
(England) Peter Richards +	9	0	10	4	6
(England) Bert Biddle	9	9	2	9
(England) A Hawes	4	5	9	2
(England) Leslie Keeble	3	9	9	9
(England) J M Peake +	9	7	7	7

Quarterfinals
(Egypt) Karim	5	9	9	10
(England) Stokes	9	0	1	8
(England) Phillips	6	9	9	10
(England) Hamer	9	1	4	8
(England) Dear	9	3	9	9
(England) Phillips	7	9	3	1
(England) Biddle	10	9	9
(England) Keeble	8	7	2

Semifinals
(Egypt) Karim	9	2	10	9
(England) Phillips	1	9	8	3
(England) Dear	9	9	9
(England) Biddle	4	4	2

Final
(Egypt) Karim	9	9	5	1	10
(England) Dear	5	3	9	9	8

+ Denotes Amateur

Preceded by 1947	British Open Squash Championships; England (London); 1948	Succeeded by 1949
