= Carla Khan =

British-Pakistani squash player

Personal information
- Born: 18 August 1981 (age 45) London, England
- Website: Carla Khan

Sport
- Country: Pakistan England
- Handedness: Right handed
- Turned pro: 1999
- Coached by: Wasil khan ( father)
- Retired: 2009
- Racquet used: Head

Women's singles
- Highest ranking: No. 21 (May 2004)
- Titles: El Salvador Open 2002, Ottawa Open 2003, Pakistan Open 2005, Iranian Open 2007 and Austrian Open 2008
- Tour final: Islamic Games 2005, Swedish Open 2005
- Updated on December 2017

Carla Khan (Urdu: کارلا خان; born 18 August 1981) is a British-Pakistani former professional squash player. She is a granddaughter of Azam Khan, one of the legends of squash in Pakistan. They descend from the North West Frontier of Pakistan and the tribe called Pathans from Peshawar and daughter of Jacqueline Stoter from Paddington, London and Wasil Khan, son of Azam Khan. Khan started playing squash in England at age 12 and competed & represented England in the junior circuit but in the early 2000s coming out of the junior circuit to senior she & her family decided to represent Pakistan.

Khan has won five titles in her career: El Salvador Open 2002, Ottawa Open 2003, Pakistan Open 2005, Iranian Open 2007 and Austrian Open in 2008. Her highest ranking was 21st. Her first tournament was at the prestigious British Open in 1999. After an unsuccessful first full season in 2000, she made a breakthrough the following year, but it was not until 2002 that she won her first title.

In November 2002, at the El Salvador Open, she reached her first final against Mexican Samantha Terán. Khan beat her 9–1, 2–9, 9–3, 9–1. Her improvements continued in 2003, her most successful season yet, and won at the Ottawa International, where she came from behind to beat Melissa Martin from Australia, 3–9, 4–9, 9–4, 9–7, 9–3. She broke into the top 30.

At the Irish Open in 2004, Khan defeated Nicol David of Malaysia on 15 April 2004, and achieved her highest ranking of 21. In 2005, Khan lost in the final of the Forbes Open to England's Alison Walters. However, she made it to the final of the 1st POF WISPA tournament in Pakistan, and beat Sharon Wee of Malaysia 9–1, 9–3, 9–4. Khan never dropped a set throughout the whole tournament, making history for female squash in Pakistan and making Pakistan proud,She ended the year by making it to yet another final, at the 4th Women Islamic Games 2005 in Tehran, but lost to Malaysian Tricia Chuah with a score of 1–9, 9–6, 1–9, 1–9.

In late 2005 she was unwell, and struggled in early 2006 until she collapsed during the 2006 South Asian Games on 24 August 2006 while playing against Joshna Chinappa from India. Khan was not expected to be back until 2008, but she returned playing in September 2007. This had seen her rankings slide outside the top 200, but she won her fourth title in 2007, at the Iranian open, beating Donna Urquhart in the finals.

In 2008, Khan defeated England's Emma Beddoes 9–2, 9–2, 9–0 to take the Austrian Open.

Khan then retired. She made a comeback in 2009. However, unable to continue. In 2010 Khan went to coach in U.S.A at the Westchester Country Club but unfortunately had to have emergency back surgery which set her career on hold. Carla married in 2012 and mother to aspiring squash players . She is known for making history for women’s squash in Pakistan and first female of the Khan Squash Dynasty to reach top 20 in the world and aspire many young females to the game of squash.

== Personal life ==
Khan is the daughter of English mother, Jacqui Stoter, and Pakistani squash player father Wasil Khan who family descend from Peshawar. She has a brother Wasil Jnr he was a top ranked junior squash player in England. She is the granddaughter of Azam Khan, second grand niece of Roshan Khan, Nasrullah Khan and Hashim Khan, niece of Sharif Khan, Rehmat Khan, Jahangir Khan and Aziz Khan, third cousin of actress Sasha Agha and Natasha Khan (better known as Bat for Lashes, a British singer-songwriter), and actress Salma Agha is her second aunt.
