= 1949 Men's British Open Squash Championship =

British Open Squash Championships
- 11th British Open Championships

Details
- Location: London, England
- Venue: Lansdowne Club

The 1949 Open Championship was held at the Lansdowne Club in London from 22 to 27 April. Mahmoud Karim won his third consecutive title defeating Brian Phillips in the final.

== Seeds ==
- (Egypt) Mahmoud Karim
- (England) Brian Phillips
- (England) Norman Borrett
- (England) Jim Dear

== Results ==
First round
(Egypt) Mahmoud Karim ^	9	9	9
16	(England) W E J Gordon	6	3	0
(England) E S Hawes	9	9	9
(England) Jack Giles	5	7	1
(England) Norman Borrett + ^	9	9	9
(England) J M Peake +	3	4	1
(England) N E Hooper +	2	9	9	9	10
(England) G J Reece	9	6	1	10	8
(England) Brian Phillips + ^	3	9	9	9
(England) LtCol W R Howson +	9	5	5	6
(England) R M Boustead +	2	9	9	9	10
(England) A W H Mallett +	9	6	1	10	8
(England) Leslie Keeble	9	10	9	9
(England) John A. Dagnall +	10	8	2	2
(England) W E Clements	w/o
(England) Jim Dear ^

Quarterfinals
(Egypt) Karim	9	9	9
(England) Hawes	0	0	2
(England) Borrett	9	9	9
(England) Hooper	1	3	2
(England) Phillips	6	9	10	9
(England) Boustead	9	4	8	4
(England) Keeble	9	9	9
(England) Clements	7	3	0

Semifinals
(Egypt) Karim	9	9	9
(England) Borrett	2	4	0
(England) Phillips	9	4	9	9
(England) Keeble	0	9	3	7

Final
(Egypt) Karim	9	9	9	9
(England) Phillips	4	2	10	4

+ amateur
^ seeded

Preceded by 1948	British Open Squash Championships; England (London); 1949	Succeeded by 1950
