= 1947 Men's British Open Squash Championship =

British Open Squash Championships
- 9th British Open Championships

Details
- Location: London, England
- Venue: Lansdowne Club & Royal Automobile Club

The 1947 Open Championship was between the defending champion Jim Dear of the Queen's Club and the professional champion Mahmoud Karim of Egypt.

The Amateur Championships returned in December 1946 and the Professional Championships returned in March 1947, so there had not been time to organise a 1946 Open Championships. However the first leg of the 1947 Open Championships finally took place on 17 December at the Lansdowne Club with the second leg held at the Royal Automobile Club on 22 December. Mahmoud Karim ran out an easy winner in the first leg winning three games to nil before securing the Open Championship with a hard-fought second leg win.

== Results ==
=== First leg ===
Lansdowne Club
(Egypt) Mahmoud Karim	9	9	9
(England) Jim Dear	4	1	3

=== Second leg ===
Royal Automobile Club
(Egypt) Mahmoud Karim	5	7	9	9	9
(England) Jim Dear	9	9	8	7	3

Preceded by 1938	British Open Squash Championships; England (London); 1947	Succeeded by 1948
