= 1938 Men's British Open Squash Championship =

British Open Squash Championships
- 8th British Open Championships

Details
- Location: London, England
- Venue: Royal Automobile Club

The 1938 Open Championship was a squash tournament between the professional champion Jim Dear of the Oxford and Cambridge Club and Bert Biddle of the Junior Carlton Club.
Because the defending Open Champion F. D. Amr Bey had retired it was decided that the 1938 Professional Championship would also be classed as the Open Championship. Therefore Bert Biddle took on L W R Keeble of the International Sportsmen's Club for the right to meet Dear. Biddle ran out the winner of that match 9–4, 7–9, 9–1, 9–0.
The 1938 Open Championship took place over two legs, both at the Royal Automobile Club on 7 & 14 December. Dear won the first leg three games to two and then secured the Open Championship with a three games to one victory in the second leg.

In all of the eight Open Championships held so far, a third leg decider was never required. In October 1939 just before the new season began all competitions were cancelled due to the war.
It would be 1947 before the return of the Championships.

== Results ==
=== First leg ===
Royal Automobile Club
(England) Jim Dear	5	9	5	9	9
(England) Bert Biddle	9	6	9	6	5

=== Second leg ===
Royal Automobile Club
(England) Jim Dear	6	9	9	9
(England) Bert Biddle	9	1	2	6

Preceded by 1937	British Open Squash Championships; England (London); 1938	Succeeded by 1947
