= 1952 Men's British Open Squash Championship =

British Open Squash Championships
- 14th British Open Championships

Details
- Location: London, England
- Venue: Lansdowne Club

The 1952 Open Championship was held at the Lansdowne Club in London from 2–7 April. Hashim Khan won his second consecutive title defeating four times champion Mahmoud Karim in the final.

== Seeds ==
(Egypt) Mahmoud Karim

(India) Brian Phillips

(Pakistan) Hashim Khan

== Results ==
First round
(Pakistan) Hashim Khan ^	9	9	9
16	(England) Peter Doggart +	3	2	1
(England) Alan Fairbairn +	7	5	9	5
(England) Alan Seymour-Hayden +	9	9	3	8	ret
(Scotland) William 'Doug' McLaggan	4	3	4
(South Africa) Dr Gavin Hildick-Smith +	9	9	9
(England) N E Hooper	10	5	9	9
(England) Leslie Keeble	8	9	0	7
(Egypt) Mahmoud Karim ^	9	9	9
(England) G J Reece	3	3	7
(England) Roy Wilson +	8	9	9	9
(England) D W Harman	10	7	2	2
(England) Brian Phillips ^	1	9	9	9
(England) Jack Giles	9	1	7	2
(England) Sir Charles McLeod +	10	8	9	3	9
(England) W E J Gordon	8	10	0	9	1

Quarterfinals
(Pakistan) Hashim Khan	9	9	9
(England) Fairbairn	4	0	0
(South Africa) Hildick-Smith	w/o
(England) Hooper	scr
(Egypt) Karim	9	9	9
(England) Wilson	3	1	6
(England) Phillips	6	9	9	9
(England) McLeod	9	1	2	5

Semifinals
(Pakistan) Hashim Khan	9	9	9
(South Africa) Hildick-Smith	2	0	2
(Egypt) Karim	9	9	9
(England) Phillips	2	4	3

Final
(Pakistan) Hashim Khan	9	9	9
(Egypt) Karim	5	7	0

+ amateur
^ seeded

Preceded by 1951	British Open Squash Championships; England (London); 1952	Succeeded by 1953
