= Khan squash family =

Pakistani family of champion squash players

The Khan squash family, sometimes referred to as the Khan squash dynasty, refers to a Pakistani family that has produced a succession of champion squash players. The dynasty's patriarch was Hashim Khan (1914-2014), whose win at the 1951 British Open began the era of his family's dominance in the sport. This family dominance continues with Ivy League star Anoush Khan. Members of the Khan family have combined for a total of 23 British Open, 16 North American Open, 19 US Professional Championships, and six World Championships wins.

== History ==
The Khan family's beginnings in the sport of squash can be traced to the British Army's officer's club in Peshawar, where Hashim's father Abdullah worked as the head steward. Around 1922 when Hashim was eight years old, his father began bringing him to the club. The young Khan soon received a job as a ball boy, and after hours taught himself to play. When Hashim was 11 his father died in a car crash, and he subsequently left school to work full-time at the officer's club. Having become a skilled squash player, in 1942 he took a job as a squash coach at the Royal Air Force officer's club in Peshawar. Two years later he won the Indian squash championship held in Bombay. After the creation of Pakistan in 1947, Khan became the squash coach for the Pakistan Air Force and in 1949 won the new country's first national championship. In 1951 the Pakistani government as well as the air force sponsored Khan to compete in the British Open in London. In that tournament, the 37-year-old beat Egyptian Mahmoud Karim in the final to capture his first title. Khan would win the Open every year between 1951 and 1958. In 1960 Khan moved his family to Detroit, where he became the squash pro at the Uptown Athletic Club. In 1973 he moved to Denver, where he spent the remainder of his life.

Hashim's sons Sharif and Aziz went on to be successful squash players, both working as professionals at clubs in Toronto. Sharif dominated the game in North America during the 1970s.

After winning the British Open in 1951, Hashim introduced his younger brother, Azam, to the sport. Azam quickly progressed and in 1954 played against his brother in the British Open final, losing in five sets. In 1959 Azam won his first title, and went on to win the next three years. Azam immigrated to England, where he owned and operated the New Grampians Squash Club in London from 1958 to 2013. Azam's granddaughter Carla became a professional squash player. In the late 1950s, Hashim and Azam's nephew, Mohibullah "Mo," also became a dominant force in international squash competitions, competing in his first British Open in 1956 at age 17. After losing in the finals thrice, in 1963 he won the title over A.A. AbouTaleb of Egypt. That same year the United States government invited Mo to their country to give a demonstration of the sport at the Pentagon. In a ceremony held at the White House after the demonstration, Mo met President John F. Kennedy. The two men got along well, and Kennedy used his influence to get Mo the position of squash pro at the Harvard Club in Boston. Mo held this position until 1994, when he died of a heart attack at the club. Mo's brother, Gul, followed his brother to Boston and became the squash pro at the University Club.

Two second cousins of Hashim and Azam – Roshan and Nasrullah – also rose to prominence in the late 1950s and early 1960s. In 1956 Roshan played and lost to Hashim in the British Open final. He won the title the following year, and lost again in 1960. Roshan's son Jahangir became, arguably, the greatest player in the sport's history. His other son, Torsam, was also a highly-ranked player. Nasrullah's son Rehmat also was a competitive player and served as Jahangir's coach.

== Family tree ==
Abdullah d. ca. 1925 | Abdulmajid | sister | Falzuliah
Hashim; 1914-2014 | Azam; 1926-2020 | sister | Safirullah | Roshan; 1929-2006 | Nasrullah
Sharif; 1946- | Aziz | Gulmast | Liaqat Ali "Charlie" | Salim Shaukuat / Mohammad Mo | Wasil | Mohibullah; 1938-1994 | Gul | Jahangir; 1963- | Torsam; 1952-1979 | Rehmat
Carla; 1981- | Sakhi | Natasha; 1979- | Zahrah S. Khan; 1992-

== See also ==
With Richard E. Randall, Hashim Khan authored the book Squash Racquets: The Khan Game (Detroit: Wayne State University Press, 1967).
