= 1937 Men's British Open Squash Championship =

British Open Squash Championships
- 7th British Open Championships

Details
- Location: London, England
- Venue: Bath Club & Royal Automobile Club

The 1937 Open Championship featured the defending open champion F. D. Amr Bey of Egypt being challenged by Jim Dear the professional champion. The first leg was held at Dear's club the Royal Automobile Club on 22 November. Bey won the first leg three games to two. The second leg took place at Bey's home Bath Club on 29 November. Bey won his fifth consecutive Open Championship title by clinching the second leg three games to one in a fifty-minute match.
After securing a sixth Amateur Championship in December 1937 the Egyptian retired from international competitions the following March and received a national banquet attended by King Farouk in his honour on 25 March in Cairo.

== Results ==
=== First leg ===
Royal Automobile Club
(Egypt) F. D. Amr Bey	10	10	4	1	9
(England) Jim Dear	8	8	9	9	4

=== Second leg ===
Bath Club
(Egypt) F. D. Amr Bey	9	8	9	9
(England) Jim Dear	7	10	6	5

Preceded by 1936	British Open Squash Championships; England (London); 1937	Succeeded by 1938
