= 1968 Women's British Open Squash Championship =

British Open Squash Championships
- 40th Women's British Open Championships

Details
- Location: London, England
- Venue: Lansdowne Club and Royal Aero Club

The 1968 Women's Open Squash Championships was held at the Lansdowne Club and Royal Aero Club in London from 16–22 February 1968. Heather McKay (née Blundell) won her seventh consecutive title by defeating Bev Johnson in the final.

== Seeds ==
1. (Australia) Heather McKay
2. (Australia) Bev Johnson
3. (England) Ann Price
4. (England) Sheila Macintosh
5. (South Africa) Mrs Gay Erskine
6. (South Africa) Mrs Jill Eckstein
7. (Scotland) Sylvia McClure
8. (South Africa) Miss Denise Holton

== Draw and results ==
=== First round ===
Player one	Player two	Score
(Australia) Heather McKay (née Blundell)	(England) A Williams	9–0 9–1 9–0
(Australia) Bev Johnson	(England) R Riley	9–5 9–4 9–0
(England) Ann Price	(England) P A Brown	9–0 9–1 9–0
(South Africa) Mrs Gay Erskine	(England) E Lendrum	9–2 9–7 9–1
(South Africa) Mrs Jill Eckstein	(England) A Geddes	9–0 9–0 9–0
(Scotland) Sylvia McClure	(England) E Taylor	9–2 9–0 9–6
(England) R F Turner	(England) E Carnegie	4–9 9–7 4–9 9–6 9–1
(England) A Norval	(England) Tessa Lawrence	9–7 3–9 10–9 9–6
(England) Peggy Mason	(England) Daphne Portway	3–9 9–4 1–9 10–9
(Australia) Margaret Burke	(England) Di Fuller	9–6 9–7 9–4
(South Africa) Miss Marcia Roche	(England) J Whitehead	9–3 9–1 9–1
(England) I V Sanderson	(England) M A Young	9–1 9–1 9–1
(England) Sheila Cooper	(England) K Gardner	9–5 9–1 9–6
(England) Claire Chapman	(England) J Mortlock	9–3 9–4 9–1
(South Africa) Miss Cathy Van Veen	(England) V Manning	9–0 9–0 9–4
(England) Sheila Ervin	(England) E M Boswell	9–0 9–6 9–1
(England) Ursula Smith	(England) S Broadway	9–3 9–1 9–1
(England) M Makower	(United States) J Hedges	w/o
(United States) A Bixler	(England) C Heath	9–7 9–7 9–1
(England) Dianne Corbett	(England) Janet Ledger	9–0 9–2 9–2
(England) Mary Alan	(England) Bobs Whitehead	6–9 1–9 1–8 ret
(New Zealand) Bronwyn Barton	(United States) Goldie Edwards	9–6 1–9 9–4 10–8

=== Second round ===
Player one	Player two	Score
(England) Sheila Macintosh (née Speight)	(South Africa) Miss Marcia Roche	9–3 5–9 9–7 2–9 7–9

=== Third round ===
Player one	Player two	Score
(Australia) McKay	(New Zealand) Barton	9–0 9–0 9–3
(Australia) Johnson	(England) McMullen	9–0 9–3 9–0
(England) Price	(South Africa) Allnut	3–9 0–9 9–1 6–9
(South Africa) Erskine	(England) Cooper	9–2 9–2 9–7
(South Africa) Eckstein	(England) Chapman	1–9 9–0 6–9 9–3 9–6
(Scotland) McClure	(South Africa) Van Veen	0–9 8–10 3–9
(South Africa) Holton	(England) Ervin	9–1 9–0 9–2
(South Africa) Roche	(Australia) Burke	9–5 9–5 9–5

=== Quarter–finals ===
Player one	Player two	Score
(Australia) McKay	(South Africa) Holton	9–2 9–0 9–0
(Australia) Johnson	(South Africa) Van Veen	9–1 9–0 0–9 9–2
(South Africa) Allnut	(South Africa) Eckstein	9–7 9–6 9–7
(South Africa) Erskine	(South Africa) Roche	9–5 3–9 9–6 9–6

=== Semi–finals ===
Player one	Player two	Score
(Australia) Heather McKay	(South Africa) Gay Erskine	9–0 9–0 9–0
(Australia) Bev Johnson	(South Africa) Allnut	9–10 9–4 9–2 9–1

=== Final ===
Player one	Player two	Score
(Australia) Heather McKay	(Australia) Bev Johnson	9–0 9–0 9–0

Preceded by 1967	British Open Squash Championships; England (London); 1968	Succeeded by 1969
