= Gordon Watson (squash player) =

Australian squash player and coach

Personal information
- Full name: Gordon John Watson
- Born: 26 January 1916 Portsea
- Died: 15 March 1992 (aged 76) Heidelberg
- Years active: 19

Sport
- Country: Australia
- Handedness: Ambidextrous
- Turned pro: 1931
- Retired: 1950
- Highest ranking: No. 3
- Title: 10

For other people named Gordon Watson, see Gordon Watson.

Gordon John Watson (1916-1992) was a squash player from Australia. He held the Australian Professional Championship and Australian Open Championship titles from 1939 undefeated until 1949. His impressive record in championship competition and his peerless coaching record have resulted in Watson being widely considered the doyen of the sport in Australia, as both player and coach, for 48 years from 1931 to 1979.

== Early playing career ==
After leaving his home town of Portsea on the Mornington Peninsula at the age of fourteen, Watson commenced his squash career at the age of sixteen. He gained employment as a masseur and gymnasium instructor at the Pearce, Bjelke Petersen Physical Culture Institute, where the first commercial squash courts in Melbourne were built in 1926. Watson went on to become the club's squash professional in 1931. Due to his employment at the club, Watson was classed as a professional and only eligible to compete in the Australian Professional Squash Championships. This competition was first held in 1931; three years after the inaugural Australian Men's Amateur Championship, held in Melbourne in 1928. Watson started competing in earnest after his first overseas trip, to England and Germany, in 1936.

== Championship career ==
Jim Watson (no relation) was the Australian Professional Champion from 1931 to 1938 and Watson was runner-up to Jim three times during this period: 1935; 1936, and 1938. In 1939 Watson finally defeated Jim Watson and went on to remain champion until 1949. The Broadhurst Cup competition began in 1939 and was contested by both the Australian Amateur and Professional Champions, becoming by default the first iteration of the Australian Open Championship. In its inaugural year Watson, already the Australian Professional Champion, defeated Merv Weston (Australian Amateur Champion), 9/7, 9/5, 9/0, becoming the first Australian Open Champion. Watson would also retain this title through to 1949 and remarkably, during this decade of Watson's domination at the top level of competition, he surrendered only a single game. The Australian Open Championship was finally liberated from Watson's domination in 1949 by the visit to Australia of British Open Champion, Egyptian Mahmoud el Karim (1916-1999). Karim, undefeated for fifteen years, met Watson in the final where Watson led 8–3 in the fifth game before a phenomenal comeback by Karim to take the game 10–8 with the final results being: 4–9, 9–0, 4–9, 9–2, 10–8.

Watson's close loss to Karim and the lack of year-round competition in Australia, inspired him to travel to contest the British Open (the effective world championship of the sport at the time) in England in 1950; the first Australian male squash player to tour overseas. As a seeded player in his first international competition, Watson put out Englishman E S Hawes in the first round: 9–1, 6–9, 9–0, 9–4. In the quarter-finals he defeated another Englishman, W E J Watson: 9–1, 9–7, 7–9, 10–9. Watson met Abdul Bari, a leading Indian player, in the semi-final and was defeated: 9–2, 9–2, 10–8. 1950 closed with the world rankings as Karim No. 1; Bari No. 2; and Gordon Watson No. 3.

English squash professional and writer Jack Giles wrote in Squash Player International in 1974, "The first [Australian] player to really make an impact on the international scene was G.J. Watson. A very popular and respected figure, Watson was a player of undoubted world class. He was afflicted by that bane of so many potentially great players - lack of real all-year round competition. He could get that competition in those days only by coming to the U.K, then only for a month at a time. An expensive and not very satisfactory arrangement."

== Coaching career ==
Watson retired from competition in 1950 and built a successful coaching career. He established Watson's Squash Academy by arrangement with the owner Betty Meagher (a close friend and champion pupil of Watson's) in Flinders Lane, Melbourne for six years and then established the Gordon Watson Squash Centre in Hawthorn Road, Caulfield in 1962. As a coach, Watson quickly demonstrated his total understanding of the sport and amassed similarly unprecedented success as that which he had enjoyed as a competitor. Before his retirement from the sport in 1979, he coached no fewer than 21 Australian title holders and countless winners of state championships. These included many early champions of the women's game: Betty Meagher; Val Watts; and Joan Watson (his sister-in-law). Between them these women took 7 Australian Amateur and 9 Victorian Amateur championships between 1946 and 1955. Watson also coached national male champions Frank Harris, Merv Weston and Ian Carson who retained 7 Australian Amateur titles between them.

== Military service ==
The outbreak of World War II interrupted the development of Watson's professional sporting career. He joined the Second Australian Imperial Force on 29 May 1940 and was assigned to the 9th Division (Australia). He served a total of 1983 days attached to the 2/4 Australian General Hospital in Tobruk and the 2/7 Field Ambulance in New Guinea. He completed his service with an honourable discharge at the rank of captain on 1 November 1945. Watson wrote a meticulous diary during the Siege of Tobruk which was digitised and published by his son John Watson, in August 2017. That diary has been lodged with the Australian War Memorial and will be available for public viewing in due course, through the AWM's online collections portal.

== Later life ==
Watson retired from the sport of squash in 1979 and died in 1992. Among other posthumous accolades, Gordon Watson was the inaugural inductee at the foundation of Squash & Racquetball Victoria's Hall of Fame in 2016 when he was simultaneously inducted as a "Legend"; an additional status introduced to recognise Hall of Fame members who, "...continued to distinguish themselves at the highest level for a period of at least five years and in doing so have offered inspiration and example to others in the Victorian squash and racquetball community."

On 16 February 2018, Watson was inducted into Squash Australia's national Hall of Fame.

== Honours and awards ==
1939–45 Star Africa Star Pacific Star Defence Medal War Medal, 1939–45 Australia Service Medal 1939–45

== See also ==
- Squash Australia
- 9th Division (Australia)
- Siege of Tobruk
- The Rats of Tobruk
- World War II
