= 1967 Women's British Open Squash Championship =

British Open Squash Championships
- 39th Women's British Open Championships

Details
- Location: London, England
- Venue: Lansdowne Club and Royal Aero Club

The 1967 Women's Open Squash Championships was held at the Lansdowne Club and Royal Aero Club in London from 10–16 February 1967.Heather McKay (née Blundell) won her sixth consecutive title defeating Anna Craven-Smith for a third successive year in the final.

== Seeds ==
1. (Australia) Heather McKay
2. (England) Anna Craven-Smith
3. (England) Fran Marshall
4. (Australia) Marion Hawcroft
5. (England) Sheila Macintosh
6. (Australia) Bev Johnson
7. (Australia) Barbara Baxter
8. (Scotland) Sylvia McClure

== Draw and results ==
=== First round ===
Player one	Player two	Score
(Australia) Heather McKay (née Blundell)	(England) M Makower	w/o
(England) Anna Craven-Smith	(Scotland) C Hitchman	9–1 9–1 9–1
(England) Fran Marshall	(England) Marjorie Townsend	9–2 9–3 9–1
(Australia) Marion Hawcroft	(England) A Geddes	9–1 9–1 9–0
(England) Sheila Macintosh (née Speight)	(England) C Heath	9–3 9–0 9–0
(Australia) Barbara Baxter	(England) J Pallister	9–3 9–1 9–0
(Australia) Bev Johnson	(England) B Law	9-0 9–1 9–1
(Scotland) Sylvia McClure	(England) Barbara McMullen	w/o
(England) M Taylor	(England) V Delaney	w/o
(England) A Norval	(England) Janet Ledger	9–0 9–2 9–1
(England) E Taylor	(England) E B Ward	8–10 6–9 9–4 9–6 9–6
(New Zealand) Bronwyn Barton	(England) R Cooper	9–6 9–5 7–9 9–3
(England) Lorna Greville-Collins	(Australia) Celeste Dickson	9–5 9–4 6–9 9–4
(England) J Dixon	(England) G Hogan	w/o
(Australia) Thea Moore	(England) O Weldon-Corkery	w/o
(Australia) Margaret Burke	(England) N A Watkins	w/o
(Australia) Jenny McDevitt	(Northern Ireland) Barbara Sanderson	9–0 9–2 9–1
(England) Jennifer Crane	(England) J M Ward	9–3 9–0 9–4
(Australia) Marlene Tierney	(England) M Ashmore	9–0 9–0 9–0
(England) Jean Wilson	(England) M White	9–0 9–4 9–0
(England) Di Fuller	(England) S Youatt	9–1 9–2 9–0
(England) Betty Keenan	(England) M J Bassett	9–1 9–2 9–0
(England) S Holmes	(England) S M Atherden	9–3 9–1 9–4
(England) Daphne Portway	(England) J Price	9–0 9–1 9–3
(England) Ann Price	(England) P Rundle	w/o
(England) Dianne Corbett	(England) Ursula Smith	2–9 9–1 9–2 9–3
(England) A G Williams	(England) D Ibrahim	7–9 9–2 9–3 9–4
(England) Annette Picton	(England) Bobs Whitehead	9–1 9–4 9–0
(Australia) Robyn Kennedy	(England) M A Young	9–0 9–3 9–0
(Australia) Helen Jackson	(England) Elizabeth Fraser	9–7 9–0 9–5
(England) Sheila Cooper	(England) P Brown	9–0 9–5 9–1
(England) Peggy Mason	(England) P Pratt	9–5 9–5 9–5

=== Second round ===
Player one	Player two	Score
(Australia) McKay	(England) Portway	9–0 9–0 9–0
(England) Craven-Smith	(England) Price	9–0 9–1 9–0
(England) Marshall	(England) Wilson	9–3 9–3 9–0
(Australia) Hawcroft	(England) Norval	9–2 9–0 9–0
(England) Macintosh	(England) Taylor	9–0 9–3 9–0
(Australia) Baxter	(England) Corbett	9–6 9–4 9–4
(Scotland) McClure	(England) Picton	9–4 10–8 9–2
(Australia) Johnson	(England) Greville-Collins	9–3 9–4 9–4
(Australia) Burke	(England) Cooper	9–7 9–3 9–0
(Australia) McDevitt	(England) Mason	9–0 9–2 9–0
(England) Crane	(England) Fuller	9–7 9–3 9–3
(Australia) Kennedy	(England) Dixon	9–3 9–3 9–1
(Australia) Moore	(Australia) Jackson	10–9 9–0 9–3
(New Zealand) Barton	(England) Holmes	9–3 9–6 0–9 3–9 9–4
(England) Keenan	(England) Williams	5–9 2–9 9–3 9–4 9–6
(Australia) Tierney	(England) Taylor	w/o

=== Third round ===
Player one	Player two	Score
(Australia) McKay	(Australia) Burke	9–1 9–0 9–0
(England) Craven-Smith	(Australia) McDevitt	9–1 9–0 9–0
(England) Marshall	(England) Crane	9–4 9–5 9–1
(Australia) Hawcroft	(Australia) Kennedy	9–6 9–4 9–1
(England) Macintosh	(Australia) Moore	9–4 9–0 9–1
(Australia) Johnson	(New Zealand) Barton	9–2 9–3 9–3
(Australia) Baxter	(England) Keenan	9–0 9–0 9–2
(Australia) Tierney	(Scotland) McClure	9–3 9–2 9–0

=== Quarter-finals ===
Player one	Player two	Score
(Australia) McKay	(England) Macintosh	9–3 9–1 9–5
(England) Craven-Smith	(Australia) Johnson	9–5 9–5 9–7
(England) Marshall	(Australia) Baxter	9–4 9–2 9–7
(Australia) Hawcroft	(Australia) Tierney	9–7 9–1 9–2

=== Semi-finals ===
Player one	Player two	Score
(Australia) McKay	(Australia) Hawcroft	9–1 9–0 9–3
(England) Craven-Smith	(England) Marshall	9–1 8–10 9–4 9–3

=== Final ===
Player one	Player two	Score
(Australia) McKay	(England) Craven-Smith	9–1 10–8 9–6

Preceded by 1966	British Open Squash Championships; England (London); 1967	Succeeded by 1968
