= Gordon Watson =

Gordon Watson is the name of:

- Gordon Watson (antique dealer) (born 1954), British antique dealer
- Gordon Watson (communist) (1912–1945), New Zealand communist, journalist and soldier
- Gordon Watson (pianist) (1921–1999), Australian musician
- Gordon Watson (footballer, born 1914) (1914–2001), English footballer
- Gordon Watson (footballer, born 1971), English footballer
- Gordon Watson (racing driver), British competitor at events such as the 1947 Ulster Trophy
- Gordon Watson (squash player) (1916–1992), from Australia
