= Tony Mallett =

English cricketer

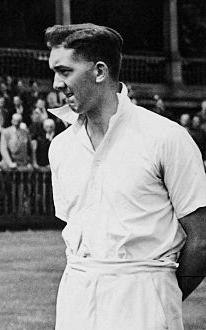
- Mallett in 1943

Personal information
- Full name: Anthony William Haward Mallett
- Born: 29 August 1924; Dulwich, England
- Died: 10 December 1994 (aged 70); Rosebank, Cape Town, South Africa
- Batting: Right-handed
- Bowling: Right-arm fast-medium
- Role: Bowler
- Relatives: Nick Mallett (son)

Domestic team information
- Years: Team
- 1946–1953: Kent
- 1947–1948: Oxford University

Career statistics
| Competition | First-class |
|---|---|
| Matches | 75 |
| Runs scored | 1,764 |
| Batting average | 18.76 |
| 100s/50s | 0/5 |
| Top score | 97 |
| Balls bowled | 5,748 |
| Wickets | 213 |
| Bowling average | 26.98 |
| 5 wickets in innings | 9 |
| 10 wickets in match | 0 |
| Best bowling | 6/42 |
| Catches/stumpings | 61/– |
- Source: CricInfo, 26 September 2018

Anthony William Haward Mallett (29 August 1924 – 10 December 1994) was an English amateur cricketer who played for Oxford University and Kent County Cricket Club. He was a school teacher who became Principal of Diocesan College in Cape Town, South Africa.

== Early life, education and war-time ==
Mallett was born in Dulwich in south London and educated at Dulwich College where he was an "outstanding schoolboy player". He was at school with Trevor Bailey who went on to play 61 Tests for England and was considered almost Bailey's equal. Wisden considered that "no school has ever possessed two such cricketers at the same time" and that it would be no surprise if both had international careers. Both he and Bailey served in the Royal Marines during World War II, playing in a number of war-time cricket matches, including for England XIs. After the war he went up to Brasenose College, Oxford where he read English Language and Literature and won Blues in cricket, squash and table-tennis.

== Sporting career ==
He had made his first-class cricket debut in 1945 for an Under 33s team against the Over 33s at Lord's before going on to make his debut for Kent in 1946 and playing for Oxford in the 1947 and 1948 University matches. After university he became a school teacher which limited his opportunities to play first-class cricket. He made a total of 75 first-class appearances, 33 of which were for Kent, generally during the summer holidays. He toured Canada with MCC in 1951 and played for a variety of teams throughout a career which lasted, at first-class level, until 1954.

Mallett played squash to a high level and reached the finals of the 1949 Men's British Open Squash Championship. He has been described as "intensely competitive" in his approach to sport.

== Teaching career ==
Mallett taught at Haileybury and Imperial Service College before emigrating to Rhodesia in 1957, joining the staff of the newly founded Peterhouse Boys' School outside Marandellas near Salisbury. He taught English and Latin and was in charge of both cricket and squash. He became housemaster of Ellis House in 1959 and senior teacher in 1961.

In 1963 he was appointed Principal of Diocesan College in Cape Town, South Africa, a post he held from 1964 until 1982. The Xhosa language was introduced as a subject at the school during Mallett's time as Principal and black pupils were admitted for the first time under his leadership, although the numbers on non-white pupils remained very low until after he had left the school. Mallett House at the school was named in memory of him when it opened in 2003.

After leaving the college he taught at King's College, Auckland in New Zealand, under headteacher Iain Campbell who had also played cricket for Kent and Oxford and who he had taught with at Peterhouse, and at St Joseph's Marist College at Rondebosch near Cape Town before retiring in 1989.

== Later life and family ==
Mallett died of cancer in 1994 aged 70. His son Nick was a rugby union player who played for and later coached the South Africa national rugby union team and coached the Italian national team. He also played first-class cricket for Oxford University. Another son became a headteacher.
