= Nasrullah Khan (squash player) =

Pakistani squash player

Nasrullah Khan was a Pakistani squash player. In 1966, he became coach to Ireland's Jonah Barrington, along with Azam Khan as Barrington's tactical advisor, helping Barrington to win his first of six British Open titles between 1967 and 1973. He also coached Angela Smith, the GB and England world star who became a legend herself in the ladies game, ensuring that the sport was professional for women.

Nasrullah is the brother of Roshan Khan, second cousin of Hashim Khan and Azam Khan and uncle of the great Jahangir Khan and Torsam Khan. His son Rahmat Khan is also a squash player, who married British actress and singer Salma Agha. His granddaughter Natasha Khan (better known by the pseudonym "Bat For Lashes") is a singer and Sashaa Agha is an actress and singer.
