= Mohibullah "Mo" Khan =

Pakistani squash player

Mohibullah Khan, often referred to by the nickname "Mo Khan", (2 December 1937 – 31 March 1994) was a squash player from Pakistan. He was one of the leading players in the game in the 1960s and a member of the famous Khan squash dynasty. His biggest triumph was winning the British Open in 1963, and he is a member of the U.S. Squash Hall of Fame.

1972 Men's British Open Squash Championship USA

== Life and career ==
Mo was the nephew of the two most dominant Pakistani squash players of the 1950s—the brothers Hashim Khan and Azam Khan—and of Roshan Khan, winner of the British Open in 1957. His cousin, Jahangir Khan, son of Roshan Khan, is regarded as the greatest squash player in history. During the 1950s and 1960s, Mo and his uncles Hashim, Azam, and Roshan dominated the sport by capturing almost every major professional squash competition.

Mo finished runner-up at the British Open to his uncle Azam in 1959, 1961, and 1962, when The British Open was considered to be the effective world championship of the sport at the time. He then won the British Open in 1963. In the final against A.A. AbouTaleb of Egypt, he saved multiple match-points from 8-1 down in the fourth game as he came back to win in five games 9-4, 5-9, 3-9, 10-8, 9-6. It would be his first and only British Open title.

In 1963, following his win in the British Open, Mo secured the backing of United States President John F. Kennedy to move to the US and take up a position as a squash professional at the Harvard Club in Boston. He spent most of the years following his move to the States playing and teaching squash's North American (i.e. hardball) game. He was runner-up to his uncle Hashim in the 1963 North American Open, and won the Open in 1964, 1965, 1966, and 1968 as well as five straight North American Pro events from 1965–69.

The change of both environment and emphasis most likely influenced Mo's straight-set semi-final loss to Michael Oddy in the 1964 British Open.

Another Pakistani squash player who was also named Mohibullah Khan emerged as one of the leading players in the game in the 1970s (see: Mohibullah Khan). To distinguish the pair, Mo is sometimes referred to as Mohibullah Khan "the elder" or Mohibullah Khan "senior". The pair are not known to be directly related, but their families originate from the same village in the Peshawar region of northern Pakistan, so it is possible that they are distantly related.

Mo died in 1994 at the age of 56 when he suddenly collapsed and died at the Harvard Club after finishing a lesson mere moments before.

In 2001, Mo was posthumously inducted into the second class of the U.S. Squash Hall of Fame. His hall of fame plaque hangs in Cafe Vittoria in Boston's North End.

== British Open final appearances ==
Wins (1)
Year	Opponent in final	Score in final
1963	A.A. AbouTaleb	9-4, 5-9, 3-9, 10-8, 9-6
Runners-up (3)
Year	Opponent in final	Score in final
1959	Azam Khan	9-5, 9-0, 9-1
1961	Azam Khan	6-9, 9-1, 9-4, 0-9, 9-2
1962	Azam Khan	9-6, 7-9, 10-8, 2-9, 9-4

== See also ==
- World Squash Doubles Championships
