= Junior Carlton Club =

Gentlemen's club in London, England (1864–1977)

Coordinates: 51°30′23.45″N 0°8′5.66″W

- Type: Gentlemen's club
- Founded: 11 February 1864
- Defunct: 1 December 1977
- Fate: Merged into the Carlton Club
- Headquarters: 30-35 Pall Mall, London

The Junior Carlton Club was a gentlemen's club in London, England. It was established in 1864 and was disbanded in 1977.

== History ==
Anticipating the forthcoming Second Reform Act under Benjamin Disraeli, numerous prospective electors decided to form a club closely aligned to the Conservative party. Adopting the model such other clubs as the Junior Athenaeum and the Junior Oxford and Cambridge Club, the Junior Carlton styled itself after the Carlton Club, which had a fixed number of members and a lengthy waiting list, and so was likely to remain out of the reach of these soon-to-be-enfranchised/newly enfranchised electors.

According to Anthony Lejeune, the Junior Carlton was the only one of the many clubs with the 'Junior' prefix to achieve anything of the prestige of the longer-standing, more established clubs which they sought to emulate.

== Club building ==
From 1869, the club was housed in sumptuous premises at 30 Pall Mall designed by David Brandon, which it occupied well into the twentieth century. The club building was built by Lucas Brothers.

In the post-World War II era, the club was to be the victim of a planning decision by its ruling committee. In 1963, the Junior Carlton's committee decided to demolish the existing club-house and replace it with a new office building incorporating accommodation that it was hoped would be "the club of the future". The resulting concrete structure opened in 1968 and is still in use today as an office building; but the part allocated to the club was badly planned and luridly decorated to 1960s architectural tastes. It proved so unpopular with the membership that many left, mainly joining the Carlton.

By 1977, the club was wound down and its few remaining members formally merged with the Carlton.

== Gallery ==
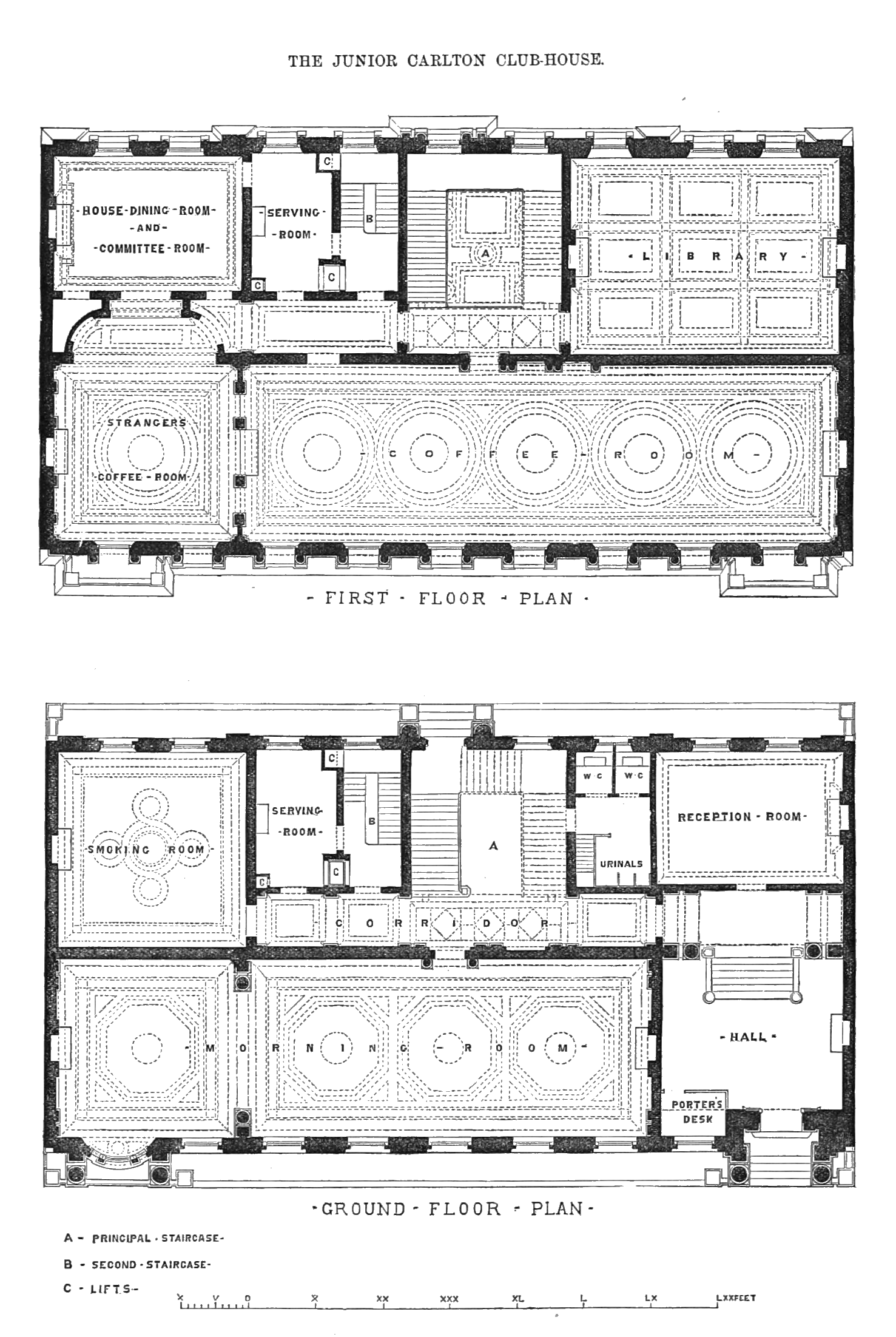
Floor plans of the 1867 clubhouse, designed by David Brandon

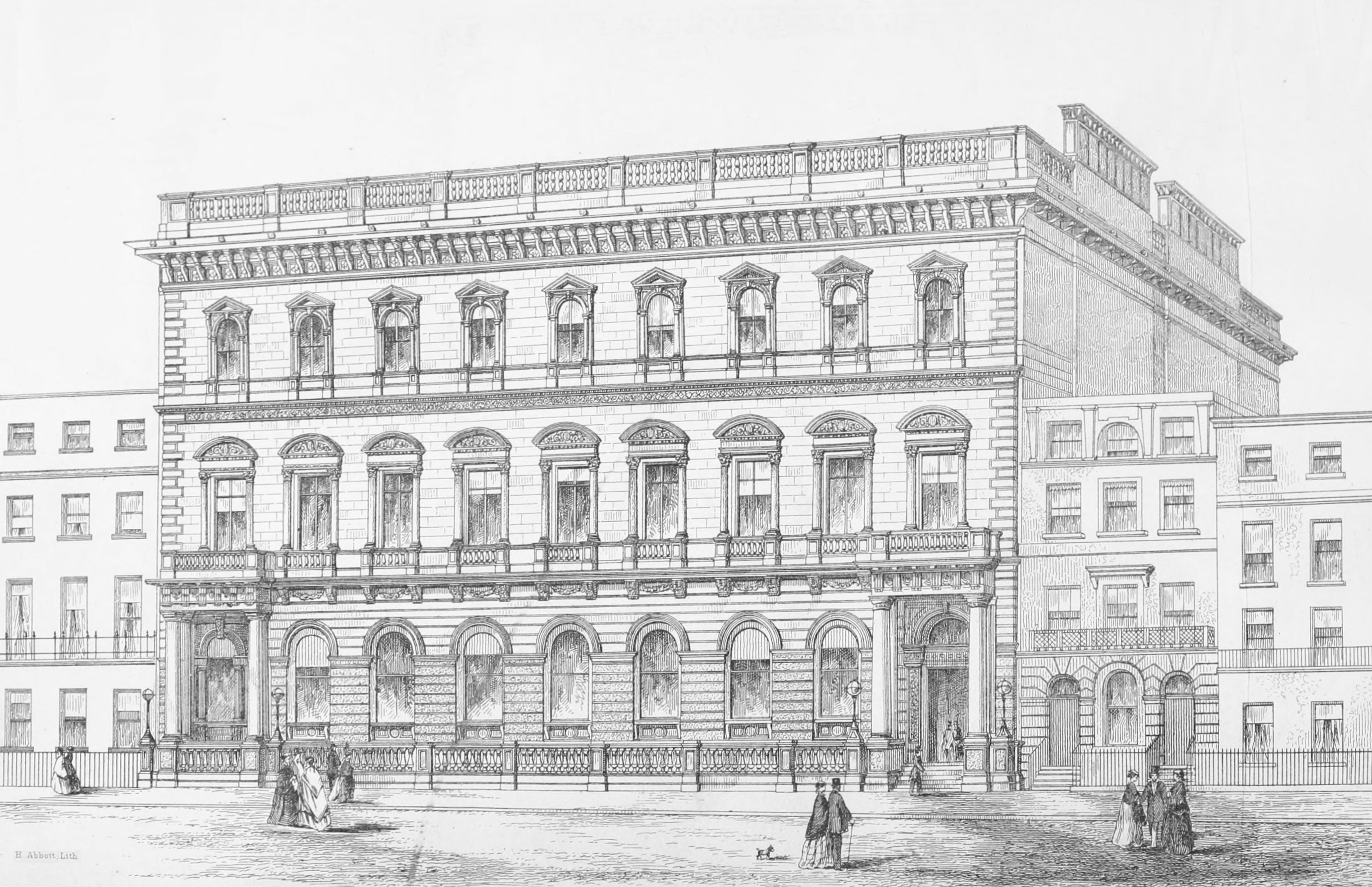
View of the Pall Mall side of the 1867 clubhouse

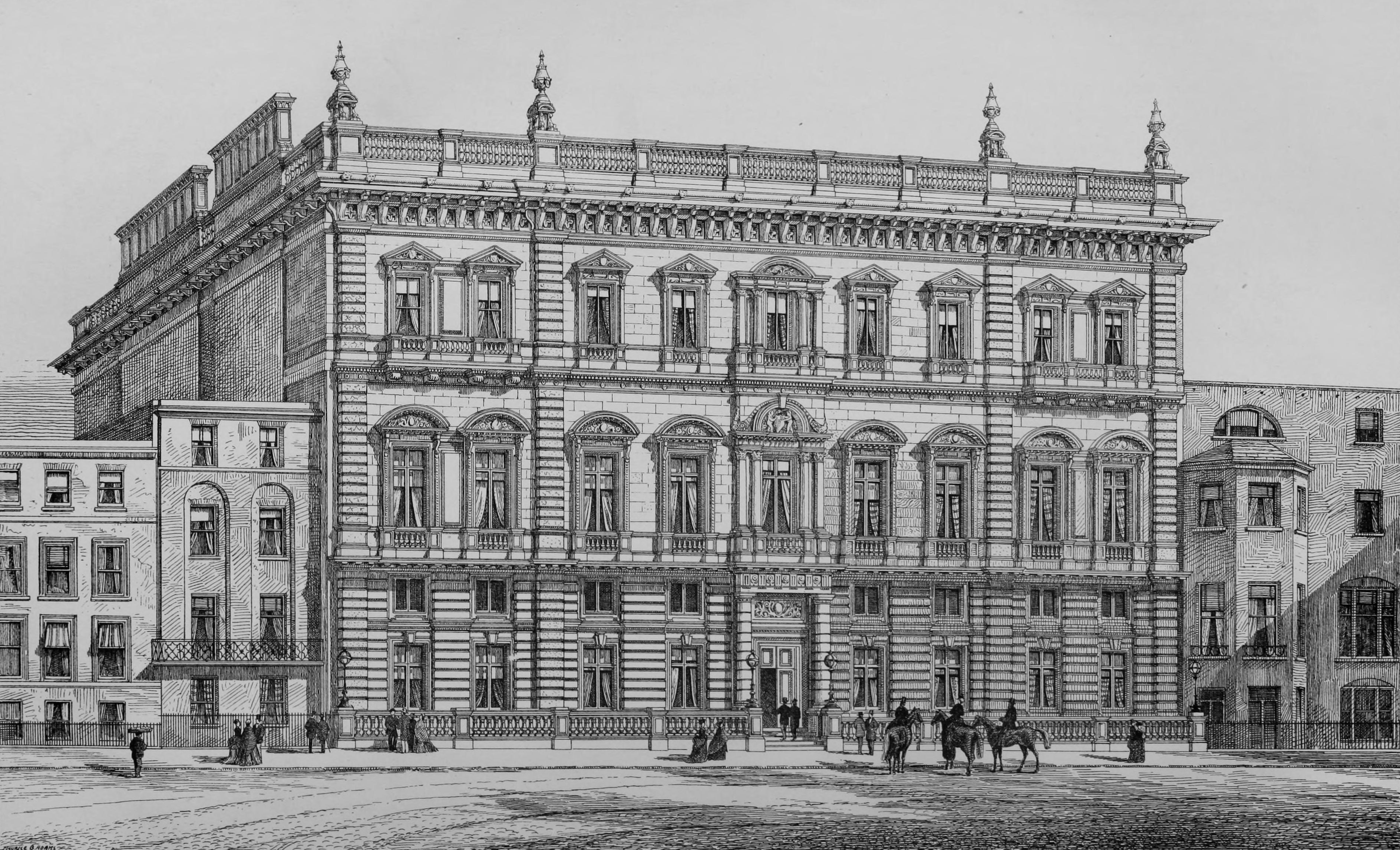
View of the St James's Square side of the 1867 clubhouse

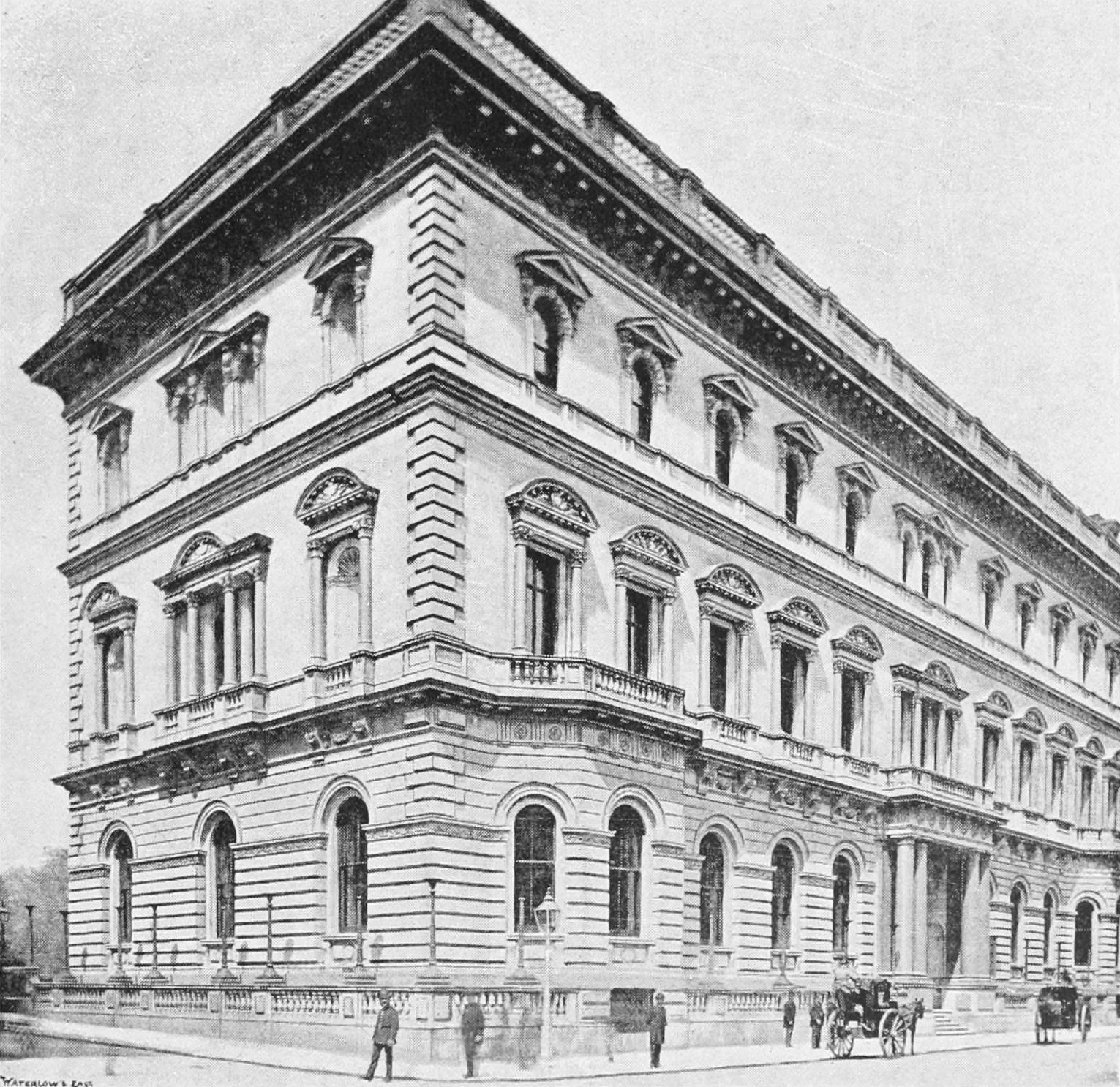
View of the clubhouse following the 1884 addition and alterations by John Macvicar Anderson

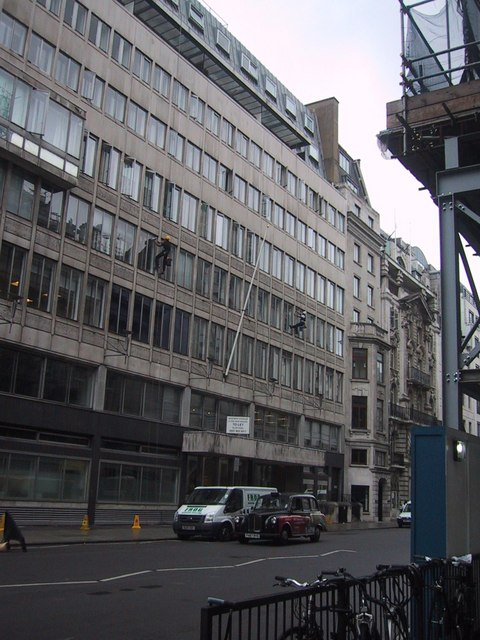
The new clubhouse was designed by Norman Royce & Partners and was begun in 1963

== See also ==
- List of London's gentlemen's clubs
