= British Open Squash Championships =

Oldest tournament in the game of squash

British Open

Details
- Event name: British Open Squash Championships
- Location: Birmingham, England
- Venue: Birmingham Repertory Theatre
- Website britishopensquash.info

Winners
- Men's: (New Zealand) Paul Coll
- Women's: (Egypt) Amina Orfi

The British Open Squash Championships is the oldest 'open' tournament in the game of squash (open to both professional and amateur players). It is widely considered to be one of the two most prestigious tournaments in the game, alongside the World Squash Championships.

Until the establishment of the World Squash Championships (which was originally called the World Open) in 1976, the British Open was considered to be the de facto world championship of the sport.

The British Open Squash Championships are often referred to as the "Wimbledon of Squash". The British Amateur Squash Championships, which was open to amateurs only, ran alongside the British Open unti it was discontinued after the 1979 edition.

== History ==
While there had been a professional men's championship for some years, the 'open' men's championship (for both professionals and amateurs) was not inaugurated until 1930.

Charles Read, British professional champion for many years, was designated the first open title holder. Would-be challengers were required to demonstrate they were capable of mounting a competent challenge, as well as guaranteeing a minimum 'purse' (prize money) of £100 (which comprised gate-takings and players' 'subscriptions'). Read subsequently played the first final as the 'defending champion' against challenger Don Butcher in December 1930, but lost in home and away legs. The men's Championship maintained this 'challenge' system format until 1947, replacing it with the current 'knockout' system in 1948.

The women's championships commenced in 1922 as an amateur event, and remained so until 1974. In the inaugural event, Joyce Cave defeated her sister Nancy Cave in the final.

Both Championships have been played continuously since inception, with the exception of the men's championship in 1934 (when no challenger to F. D. Amr Bey entered), and both championships during World War II, and in 2010 and 2011 due to lack of sponsorship. The men's and women's events were originally held separately, but have been held as a joint event since 1983.

The most successful players in the history of the championships are Australian Heather McKay (née Blundell), who won the women's event 16 consecutive times from 1962 to 1977, and Pakistani Jahangir Khan, who won the men's title 10 consecutive times from 1982 to 1991.

== Venues ==
The event has been held at various venues since the challenge system ended in 1947.

- 1948–1960: Lansdowne Club, London
- 1961–1962: Royal Automobile Club, London
- 1963–1968: Lansdowne Club and Royal Aero Club, London
- 1969, 1970–1974: Abbeydale Park, Sheffield
- 1970–1971: Edgbaston Priory, Birmingham
- 1975–1980+ Wembley Squash Centre, London
- 1980+, 1984–1994: Wembley Conference Centre
- 1981–1982: Churchill Theatre, Bromley
- 1983: Assembly Rooms, Derby
- 1984–1994: Wembley Conference Centre, London
- 1995–1996: Cardiff International Arena, Wales
- 1997: Wales National Ice Rink, Cardiff, Wales
- 1998, 2000, 2001: National Indoor Arena, Birmingham
- 1999: Aberdeen Squash Rackets Club and Aberdeen Exhibition and Conference Centre, Aberdeen, Scotland
- 2002, 2005, 2007, 2009: National Squash Centre, Manchester
- 2003–2004: Albert Hall, Nottingham
- 2006: University of Nottingham, Nottingham
- 2008: Echo Arena, Liverpool
- 2012: The O2, London
- 2013: KC Stadium, Hull
- 2014–2022: Airco Arena, Hull
- 2023–present: Edgbaston Priory Club and Birmingham Repertory Theatre, Birmingham

+ later rounds held at Conference Centre

== Decline ==
After being staged at the Wembley Conference Centre for 10 years until 1994 with some capacity crowds, the event began to move around Britain with eight different venues over the next 17 years – only twice staying in the same venue for consecutive years.

The competition suffered much uncertainty as it continued to move around the country. In 1999, the event was nearly dropped due to lack of sponsorship, but was saved by a last-minute deal. Promoter Alan Thatcher took the event to Aberdeen in conjunction with the newly-formed Eye Group. A crowd of 1,600 witnessed an astonishing final at Aberdeen Exhibition Centre, where local hero Peter Nicol collapsed at courtside with the score one game all against his great rival Jonathon Power and was rushed to hospital suffering from food poisoning. A deal with Sky Sports was signed in 2000 to cover the event saw record prize money of £110,000 but by the following year it had moved again to Birmingham's National Indoor Arena.

Long term deals were agreed, but subsequently terminated early casting doubts over the staging of the event. A seven-year deal to play at the National Indoor Arena in Birmingham from 2000 was terminated after two. Fablon Investments cash injection over eight years was pulled in 2002 after less than two years. Promoters John Beddington and John Nimmick moved the Open to Nottingham but they ended their involvement in 2005, again after two years.

Shorter term agreements also began falling through, the Royal Horticultural Halls in London was announced as the venue for the 2005 British Open, but that agreement ended up scrapped with Manchester stepping in to host. Dunlop pulled out of their sponsorship in 2008, but the competition staggered on. The 2010 event was postponed as organisers tried to get the event moved back to London, but by the time the £200,000 headline sponsor withdrew their support the 2011 competition was also cancelled.

In May 2012, the competition returned with England Squash holding the British Open at The O2 with a new sponsor secured

== Men's championship ==
Until 1975 only 14 countries: ENG,SCO,WAL,IRL,USA,RSA,AUS,NZL,EGY,PAK,IND,IRI,ZIM,PNG.

Year	Champion	Runner-up	Score
Unofficial World Championship (1929-1975)
1929	(England) Charles Read	Appointed champion
1930	(England) Don Butcher	(England) Charles Read	9–6, 9–5, 9–5 and 9–3, 9–5, 9–3
1931	(England) Don Butcher	(England) Charles Arnold	9–0, 9–0, 9–0 and 9–3, 9–0, 9–5
First competitor outside of England and GBR (1932)
1932	(Egypt) F.D. Amr Bey	(England) Don Butcher	9–0, 9–7, 9–1 and 5–9, 5–9, 9–2, 9–1, 9–0
1933	(Egypt) F.D. Amr Bey	No challenger entered
1934	(Egypt) F.D. Amr Bey	(England) Don Butcher	9–4, 8–10, 10–8, 9–0 and 9–6, 6–9, 9–2, 0–9, 9–5
1935	(Egypt) F.D. Amr Bey	(England) Jim Dear	9–3, 6–9, 8–10, 9–2, 9–4 and 9–4, 9–7, 3–9, 9–7
1936	(Egypt) F.D. Amr Bey	(England) Jim Dear	9–7, 7–9, 9–7, 5–9, 9–6 and 9–7, 8–10, 9–1, 9–6
1937	(Egypt) F.D. Amr Bey	(England) Jim Dear	10–8, 10–8, 4–9, 1–9, 9–4 and 9–7, 8–10, 9–6, 9–5
1938	(England) Jim Dear	(England) Bert Biddle	5–9, 9–6, 5–9, 9–6, 9–5 and 6–9, 9–1, 9–2, 9–6
1939	No competition (World War II)
1940	No competition (World War II)
1941	No competition (World War II)
1942	No competition (World War II)
1943	No competition (World War II)
1944	No competition (World War II)
1945	No competition (World War II)
1946	No competition (World War II)
1947	(Egypt) Mahmoud Karim	(England) Jim Dear	9–4, 9–1, 9–3 and 5–9, 7–9, 9–8, 9–7, 9–4
1948	(Egypt) Mahmoud Karim	(England) Jim Dear	9–5, 9–3, 5–9, 1–9, 10–8
1949	(Egypt) Mahmoud Karim	(England) Brian Phillips	9–4, 9–2, 9–10, 9–4
1950	(Egypt) Mahmoud Karim	(India) Abdul Bari	9–4, 9–2, 9–7
1951	(Pakistan) Hashim Khan	(Egypt) Mahmoud Karim	9–5, 9–0, 9–0
1952	(Pakistan) Hashim Khan	(Egypt) Mahmoud Karim	9–5, 9–7, 9–0
1953	(Pakistan) Hashim Khan	(England) Roy Wilson	9–2, 8–10, 9–1, 9–0
1954	(Pakistan) Hashim Khan	(Pakistan) Azam Khan	6–9, 9–6, 9–6, 7–9, 9–5
1955	(Pakistan) Hashim Khan	(Pakistan) Azam Khan	9–7, 7–9, 9–7, 5–9, 9–7
1956	(Pakistan) Hashim Khan	(Pakistan) Roshan Khan	9–4, 9–2, 5–9, 9–5
1957	(Pakistan) Roshan Khan	(Pakistan) Hashim Khan	6–9, 9–5, 9–2, 9–1
1958	(Pakistan) Hashim Khan	(Pakistan) Azam Khan	9–7, 6–9, 9–6, 9–7
1959	(Pakistan) Azam Khan	(Pakistan) Mo Khan	9–5, 9–0, 9–1
1960	(Pakistan) Azam Khan	(Pakistan) Roshan Khan	9–1, 9–0, 9–0
1961	(Pakistan) Azam Khan	(Pakistan) Mo Khan	6–9, 9–1, 9–4, 0–9, 9–2
1962	(Pakistan) Azam Khan	(Pakistan) Mo Khan	9–6, 7–9, 10–8, 2–9, 9–4
1963	(Pakistan) Mo Khan	(Egypt) A.A. AbouTaleb	9–4, 5–9, 3–9, 10–8, 9–6
1964	(Egypt) A.A. AbouTaleb	(Scotland) Mike Oddy	9–3, 9–7, 9–0
1965	(Egypt) A.A. AbouTaleb	(Egypt) Ibrahim Amin	9–0, 0–9, 9–1, 9–6
1966	(Egypt) A.A. AbouTaleb	(Pakistan) Aftab Jawaid	9–6, 5–9, 9–3, 9–1
1967	(Republic of Ireland) Jonah Barrington	(Pakistan) Aftab Jawaid	9–2, 5–9, 9–2, 9–2
1968	(Republic of Ireland) Jonah Barrington	(Egypt) A.A. AbouTaleb	9–6, 9–0, 9–5
1969	(Australia) Geoff Hunt	(Australia) Cam Nancarrow	9–5, 9–4, 9–0
1970	(Republic of Ireland) Jonah Barrington	(Australia) Geoff Hunt	9–7, 3–9, 9–4, 9–4
1971	(Republic of Ireland) Jonah Barrington	(Pakistan) Aftab Jawaid	9–1, 9–2, 9–6
1972	(Republic of Ireland) Jonah Barrington	(Australia) Geoff Hunt	0–9, 9–7, 10–8, 6–9, 9–7
1973	(Republic of Ireland) Jonah Barrington	(Pakistan) Gogi Alauddin	9–4, 9–3, 9–2
1974	(Australia) Geoff Hunt	(Pakistan) Mo Yasin	Walkover
1975	(Pakistan) Qamar Zaman	(Pakistan) Gogi Alauddin	9–7, 9–6, 9–1
Unofficial World Championship (1929-1975)
1976	(Australia) Geoff Hunt	(Pakistan) Mohibullah Khan	7–9, 9–4, 8–10, 9–2, 9–2
1977	(Australia) Geoff Hunt	(Australia) Cam Nancarrow	9–4, 9–4, 8–10, 9–4
1978	(Australia) Geoff Hunt	(Pakistan) Qamar Zaman	7–9, 9–1, 9–1, 9–2
1979	(Australia) Geoff Hunt	(Pakistan) Qamar Zaman	2–9, 9–7, 9–0, 6–9, 9–3
Since 1980 Open era
1980	(Australia) Geoff Hunt	(Pakistan) Qamar Zaman	9–3, 9–2, 1–9, 9–1
1981	(Australia) Geoff Hunt	(Pakistan) Jahangir Khan	9–2, 9–7, 5–9, 9–7
1982	(Pakistan) Jahangir Khan	(Pakistan) Hiddy Jahan	9–2, 10–9, 9–3
1983	(Pakistan) Jahangir Khan	(Egypt) Gamal Awad	9–2, 9–5, 9–1
1984	(Pakistan) Jahangir Khan	(Pakistan) Qamar Zaman	9–0, 9–3, 9–5
1985	(Pakistan) Jahangir Khan	(Australia) Chris Dittmar	9–3, 9–2, 9–5
1986	(Pakistan) Jahangir Khan	(New Zealand) Ross Norman	9–6, 9–4, 9–6
1987	(Pakistan) Jahangir Khan	(Pakistan) Jansher Khan	9–6, 9–0, 9–5
1988	(Pakistan) Jahangir Khan	(Australia) Rodney Martin	9–2, 9–10, 9–0, 9–1
1989	(Pakistan) Jahangir Khan	(Australia) Rodney Martin	9–2, 3–9, 9–5, 0–9, 9–2
1990	(Pakistan) Jahangir Khan	(Australia) Rodney Martin	9–6, 10–8, 9–1
1991	(Pakistan) Jahangir Khan	(Pakistan) Jansher Khan	2–9, 9–4, 9–4, 9–0
1992	(Pakistan) Jansher Khan	(Australia) Chris Robertson	9–7, 10–9, 9–5
1993	(Pakistan) Jansher Khan	(Australia) Chris Dittmar	9–6, 9–5, 6–9, 9–2
1994	(Pakistan) Jansher Khan	(Australia) Brett Martin	9–1, 9–0, 9–10, 9–1
1995	(Pakistan) Jansher Khan	(England) Peter Marshall	15–4, 15–4, 15–5
1996	(Pakistan) Jansher Khan	(Australia) Rodney Eyles	15–13, 15–8, 15–10
1997	(Pakistan) Jansher Khan	(Scotland) Peter Nicol	17–15, 9–15, 15–12, 8–15, 15–8
1998	(Scotland) Peter Nicol	(Pakistan) Jansher Khan	17–16, 15–4, 15–5
1999	(Canada) Jonathon Power	(Scotland) Peter Nicol	15–17, 15–12, rtd
2000	(Wales) David Evans	(Australia) Paul Price	15–11, 15–6, 15–10
2001	(Australia) David Palmer	(England) Chris Walker	12–15, 13–15, 15–2, 15–9, 15–5
2002	(England) Peter Nicol	(Scotland) John White	15–9, 15–8, 15–8
2003	(Australia) David Palmer	(England) Peter Nicol	15–13, 15–13, 15–8
2004	(Australia) David Palmer	(Egypt) Amr Shabana	10–11 (4–6), 11–7, 11–10 (3–1), 11–7
2005	(Australia) Anthony Ricketts	(England) James Willstrop	11–7, 11–9, 11–7
2006	(England) Nick Matthew	(France) Thierry Lincou	11–8, 5–11, 11–4, 9–11, 11–6
2007	(France) Grégory Gaultier	(France) Thierry Lincou	11–4, 10–11 (0–2), 11–6, 11–3
2008	(Australia) David Palmer	(England) James Willstrop	11–9, 11–9, 8–11, 6–11, 11–10 (3–1)
2009	(England) Nick Matthew	(England) James Willstrop	8–11, 11–8, 7–11, 11–3, 12–10
2010	No competition
2011	No competition
2012	(England) Nick Matthew	(Egypt) Ramy Ashour	11–9, 11–4, 11–8
2013	(Egypt) Ramy Ashour	(France) Grégory Gaultier	7–11, 11–4, 11–7, 11–8
2014	(France) Grégory Gaultier	(England) Nick Matthew	11–3, 11–6, 11–2
2015	(Egypt) Mohamed El Shorbagy	(France) Grégory Gaultier	11–9, 6–11, 5–11, 11–8, 11–5
2016	(Egypt) Mohamed El Shorbagy	(Egypt) Ramy Ashour	11–2, 11–5, 11–9
2017	(France) Grégory Gaultier	(England) Nick Matthew	8–11, 11–7, 11–3, 11–3
2018	(Colombia) Miguel Ángel Rodríguez	(Egypt) Mohamed El Shorbagy	11–7, 6–11, 8–11, 11–2, 11–9
2019	(Egypt) Mohamed El Shorbagy	(Egypt) Ali Farag	11–9, 5–11, 11–5, 11–9
2020	Cancelled due to COVID-19 pandemic in the United Kingdom
2021	(New Zealand) Paul Coll	(Egypt) Ali Farag	6–11, 11–6, 11–6, 11–8
2022	(New Zealand) Paul Coll	(Egypt) Ali Farag	12–10, 11–6, 11–4
2023	(Egypt) Ali Farag	(Peru) Diego Elías	13–11, 5-11, 11–8, 11–9
2024	(Egypt) Mostafa Asal	(Egypt) Ali Farag	11–5, 2–11, 13–11, 4–11, 12–10
2025	(Peru) Diego Elías	(Egypt) Mostafa Asal	11-4, 11-9, 3-11, 11-4
2026	(New Zealand) Paul Coll	(Egypt) Mostafa Asal	9-11, 11-3, 11-6, 0-0rtd

Note:
1) From 1931 to 1947, the men's championship was decided by a best-of-three-matches contest between the defending champion and a single challenger (the third match was never required, as the ultimate champion won the first two matches on each of the occasions in which the final was played with this format). The championship has been played using a 'knockout' format since 1948.

2) Peter Nicol changed his nationality in 2001.

=== By number of victories ===
Rank	Player Name	No. of Titles	Runner-up	Final Appearances
1	(Pakistan) Jahangir Khan	10	1	11
2	(Australia) Geoff Hunt	8	2	10
3	(Pakistan) Hashim Khan	7	1	8
4	(Pakistan) Jansher Khan	6	3	9
5	(Republic of Ireland) Jonah Barrington	6	0	6
6	(Egypt) F.D. Amr Bey	6	0	6
7	(Pakistan) Azam Khan	4	3	7
8	(Egypt) Mahmoud Karim	4	2	6
9	(Australia) David Palmer	4	0	4
10	(Egypt) A.A. AbouTaleb	3	2	5
10	(England) Nick Matthew	3	2	5
10	(France) Grégory Gaultier	3	2	5
13	(Egypt) Mohamed El Shorbagy	3	1	4
14	(Scotland) / (England) Peter Nicol	2	3	5
15	(England) Don Butcher	2	2	4
16	(New Zealand) Paul Coll	2	0	2
17	(England) Jim Dear	1	5	6
18	(Pakistan) Qamar Zaman	1	4	5
19	(Pakistan) Mo Khan	1	3	4
19	(Egypt) Ali Farag	1	3	4
19	(Egypt) Ramy Ashour	1	2	3
19	(Pakistan) Roshan Khan	1	2	3
19	(England) Charles Read	1	1	2
19	(Peru) Diego Elías	1	1	2
19	(Egypt) Mostafa Asal	1	1	2
26	(Wales) David Evans	1	0	1
26	(Canada) Jonathon Power	1	0	1
26	(Australia) Anthony Ricketts	1	0	1
26	(Colombia) Miguel Ángel Rodríguez	1	0	1
30	(Pakistan) Aftab Jawaid	0	3	3
30	(Australia) Rodney Martin	0	3	3
30	(England) James Willstrop	0	3	3
33	(Pakistan) Gogi Alauddin	0	2	2
33	(Australia) Chris Dittmar	0	2	2
33	(France) Thierry Lincou	0	2	2
33	(Australia) Cam Nancarrow	0	2	2
37	(Egypt) Ibrahim Amin	0	1	1
37	(England) Charles Arnold	0	1	1
37	(Egypt) Gamal Awad	0	1	1
37	(India) Abdul Bari	0	1	1
37	(England) Bert Biddle	0	1	1
37	(Australia) Rodney Eyles	0	1	1
37	(Pakistan) Hiddy Jahan	0	1	1
37	(Pakistan) Mohibullah Khan	0	1	1
37	(New Zealand) Ross Norman	0	1	1
37	(Australia) Brett Martin	0	1	1
37	(England) Peter Marshall	0	1	1
37	(Scotland) Mike Oddy	0	1	1
37	(England) Brian Phillips	0	1	1
37	(Australia) Paul Price	0	1	1
37	(Australia) Chris Robertson	0	1	1
37	(Egypt) Amr Shabana	0	1	1
37	(England) Chris Walker	0	1	1
37	(Scotland) John White	0	1	1
37	(England) Roy Wilson	0	1	1
37	(Pakistan) Mo Yasin	0	1	1

=== By country ===
Champions		Runner-up	
Pakistan	30	Pakistan	25
Egypt	19	England	20
Australia	13	Egypt	16
England	8	Australia	13
Ireland	6	France	4
France	3	Scotland	4
New Zealand	3	India	1
Scotland	1	New Zealand	1
Wales	1	Peru	1
Colombia	1		
Canada	1		
Peru	1		

== Women's championship ==
Until 1975 only 9 countries: ENG,SCO,WAL,IRL,USA,BEL,RSA,AUS,NZL.

Year	Champion	Runner-up	Score
Unofficial World Championship (1922-1975)
1922	(England) Joyce Cave	(England) Nancy Cave	11–15, 15–10, 15–9
1923	(England) Silvia Huntsman	(England) Nancy Cave	6–15, 15–9, 17–15
1924	(England) Nancy Cave	(England) Joyce Cave	15–8, 15–13
1925	(England) Joyce Cave	(England) Nancy Cave	15–3, 6–15, 16–13
1926	(England) Cecily Fenwick	(England) Nancy Cave	15–12, 15–11
1927	(England) Cecily Fenwick	(England) Nancy Cave	4–9, 9–6, 9–2, 9–5
1928	(England) Joyce Cave	(England) Cecily Fenwick	4–9, 9–5, 10–9, 9–6
1929	(England) Nancy Cave	(England) Joyce Cave	9–6, 3–9, 9–2, 3–9, 9–6
1930	(England) Nancy Cave	(England) Cecily Fenwick	10–8, 9–1, 7–9, 9–5
First competitor outside of England (1931)
1931	(England) Cecily Fenwick	(England) Nancy Cave	9–7, 10–8, 9–10, 9–1
1932	(England) Susan Noel	(England) Joyce Cave	9–5, 9–7, 9–1
1933	(England) Susan Noel	(England) Sheila Keith-Jones	9–4, 9–0, 9–2
First competitor outside of GBR (1934)
1934	(England) Susan Noel	(England) Margot Lumb	9–7, 9–0, 9–6
1935	(England) Margot Lumb	(England) Anne Lytton-Milbanke	9–4, 9–0, 9–1
1936	(England) Margot Lumb	(England) Anne Lytton-Milbanke	9–5, 9–5, 9–4
1937	(England) Margot Lumb	(England) Sheila McKechnie	9–3, 9–2, 9–0
1938	(England) Margot Lumb	(England) Sheila McKechnie	9–3, 9–2, 9–1
1939	(England) Margot Lumb	(England) Susan Noel	9–6, 9–1, 9–7
1940	No competition (World War II)
1941	No competition (World War II)
1942	No competition (World War II)
1943	No competition (World War II)
1944	No competition (World War II)
1945	No competition (World War II)
1946	No competition (World War II)
1947	(England) Joan Curry	(England) Alice Teague	9–3, 10–9, 9–5
1948	(England) Joan Curry	(England) Janet Morgan	9–5, 9–0, 9–10, 6–9, 10–8
1949	(England) Joan Curry	(England) Janet Morgan	2–9, 9–3, 10–8, 9–0
1950	(England) Janet Morgan	(England) Joan Curry	9–4, 9–3, 9–0
1951	(England) Janet Morgan	(England) Joan Curry	9–1, 2–9, 9–3, 9–4
1952	(England) Janet Morgan	(England) Joan Curry	9–3, 9–1, 9–5
1953	(England) Janet Morgan	(England) Marjorie Townsend	9–4, 9–2, 9–4
1954	(England) Janet Morgan	(England) Sheila Speight	9–3, 9–1, 9–7
1955	(England) Janet Morgan	(England) Ruth Turner	9–5, 9–3, 9–6
1956	(England) Janet Morgan	(England) Sheila Speight	9–6, 9–4, 9–2
1957	(England) Janet Morgan	(England) Sheila Speight	4–9, 9–5, 9–1, 9–6
1958	(England) Janet Morgan	(England) Sheila Macintosh (born Speight)	9–7, 6–9, 9–6, 9–7
1959	(England) Janet Morgan	(England) Sheila Macintosh	9–4, 9–1, 9–5
1960	(England) Sheila Macintosh	(England) Fran Marshall	4–9, 8–9, 9–5, 9–3, 9–6
1961	(England) Fran Marshall	(England) Ruth Turner	9–3, 9–5, 9–1
1962	(Australia) Heather Blundell	(England) Fran Marshall	9–6, 9–5, 9–4
1963	(Australia) Heather Blundell	(England) Fran Marshall	9–4, 9–2, 9–6
1964	(Australia) Heather Blundell	(England) Fran Marshall	9–2, 9–2, 9–1
1965	(Australia) Heather Blundell	(England) Anna Craven-Smith	9–0, 9–1, 9–2
1966	(Australia) Heather McKay (born Blundell)	(England) Anna Craven-Smith	9–0, 9–0, 10–8
1967	(Australia) Heather McKay	(England) Anna Craven-Smith	9–1, 10–8, 9–6
1968	(Australia) Heather McKay	(Australia) Bev Johnson	9–0, 9–0, 9–0
1969	(Australia) Heather McKay	(England) Fran Marshall	9–2, 9–0, 9–0
1970	(Australia) Heather McKay	(South Africa) Marcia Roche	9–1, 9–1, 9–0
1971	(Australia) Heather McKay	(Australia) Jenny Irving	9–0, 9–3, 9–1
1972	(Australia) Heather McKay	(South Africa) Kathy Malan	9–1, 9–1, 9–2
1973	(Australia) Heather McKay	(New Zealand) Cecilie Fleming	9–1, 9–0, 9–1
1974	(Australia) Heather McKay	(England) Sue Cogswell	9–2, 9–1, 9–2
1975	(Australia) Heather McKay	(Australia) Marion Jackman	9–3, 9–1, 9–5
Unofficial World Championship (1922-1975)
1976	(Australia) Heather McKay	(Australia) Sue Newman	9–2, 9–4, 9–2
1977	(Australia) Heather McKay	(Australia) Barbara Wall	9–3, 9–1, 9–2
1978	(Australia) Sue Newman	(Australia) Vicki Hoffmann	9–4, 9–7, 9–2
1979	(Australia) Barbara Wall	(England) Sue Cogswell	8–10, 6–9, 9–4, 9–4, 9–3
Since 1980 Open era
1980	(Australia) Vicki Hoffmann	(England) Sue Cogswell	9–5, 9–5, 9–3
1981	(Australia) Vicki Hoffmann	(Australia) Margaret Zachariah	9–6, 9–4, 9–0
1982	(Australia) Vicki Cardwell (born Hoffmann)	(England) Lisa Opie	9–4, 5–9, 9–4, 9–4
1983	(Australia) Vicki Cardwell	(England) Lisa Opie	9–10, 9–6, 9–4, 9–5
1984	(New Zealand) Susan Devoy	(England) Lisa Opie	5–9, 9–0, 9–7, 9–1
1985	(New Zealand) Susan Devoy	(England) Martine Le Moignan	9–6, 5–9, 9–6, 9–5
1986	(New Zealand) Susan Devoy	(England) Lisa Opie	9–4, 9–2, 9–3
1987	(New Zealand) Susan Devoy	(England) Lucy Soutter	2–9, 4–9, 9–4, 9–2, 9–1
1988	(New Zealand) Susan Devoy	(Australia) Liz Irving	9–7, 9–5, 9–1
1989	(New Zealand) Susan Devoy	(England) Martine Le Moignan	8–10, 10–8, 9–3, 9–6
1990	(New Zealand) Susan Devoy	(England) Suzanne Horner	9–2, 1-9, 9–3, 9–3
1991	(England) Lisa Opie	(England) Sue Wright	6–9, 9–3, 9–3, 9–4
1992	(New Zealand) Susan Devoy	(England) Martine Le Moignan	9–3, 9–5, 9–3
1993	(Australia) Michelle Martin	(England) Suzanne Horner	9–7, 9–0, 9–4
1994	(Australia) Michelle Martin	(Australia) Liz Irving	9–1, 9–5, 9–3
1995	(Australia) Michelle Martin	(Australia) Liz Irving	9–4, 9–7, 9–5
1996	(Australia) Michelle Martin	(Australia) Sarah Fitz-Gerald	1–9, 9–5, 9–1, 9–7
1997	(Australia) Michelle Martin	(Australia) Sarah Fitz-Gerald	9–5, 9–10, 9–5, 9–5
1998	(Australia) Michelle Martin	(Australia) Sarah Fitz-Gerald	9–4, 9–2, 9–1
1999	(New Zealand) Leilani Joyce	(England) Cassie Campion	5–9, 9–6, 9–3, 10–8
2000	(New Zealand) Leilani Joyce	(England) Sue Wright	9–7, 9–4, 9–2
2001	(Australia) Sarah Fitz-Gerald	(Australia) Carol Owens	10–9, 9–0, 9–2
2002	(Australia) Sarah Fitz-Gerald	(England) Tania Bailey	9–3, 9–0, 9–0
2003	(Australia) Rachael Grinham	(England) Cassie Campion	9–3, 7–9, 9–2, 9–5
2004	(Australia) Rachael Grinham	(United States) Natalie Grainger	6–9, 9–5, 9–0, 9–3
2005	(Malaysia) Nicol David	(Australia) Natalie Grinham	9–6, 9–7, 9–6
2006	(Malaysia) Nicol David	(Australia) Rachael Grinham	9–4, 9–1, 9–4
2007	(Australia) Rachael Grinham	(Malaysia) Nicol David	7–9, 4–9, 9–3, 10–8, 9–1
2008	(Malaysia) Nicol David	(England) Jenny Duncalf	9–1, 10–8, 9–0
2009	(Australia) Rachael Grinham	(Republic of Ireland) Madeline Perry	11–6, 11–5, 12–10
2010	No competition
2011	No competition
2012	(Malaysia) Nicol David	(Egypt) Nour El Sherbini	11-6, 11–6, 11-6
2013	(England) Laura Massaro	(Malaysia) Nicol David	11–4, 3–11, 12–10, 11–8
2014	(Malaysia) Nicol David	(England) Laura Massaro	8–11, 11–5, 11–7, 11–8
2015	(France) Camille Serme	(England) Laura Massaro	11–3, 11–5, 8–11, 11–8
2016	(Egypt) Nour El Sherbini	(Egypt) Nouran Gohar	11–7, 9–11, 7–11, 11–6, 11–8
2017	(England) Laura Massaro	(England) Sarah-Jane Perry	11–8, 11–8, 6–11, 11–6
2018	(Egypt) Nour El Sherbini	(Egypt) Raneem El Weleily	11–6, 11–9, 14–12
2019	(Egypt) Nouran Gohar	(France) Camille Serme	11–3, 11–8, 11–3
2020	Postponed due to COVID-19 pandemic in the United Kingdom
2021	(Egypt) Nour El Sherbini	(Egypt) Nouran Gohar	9-11, 13-11, 5-11, 11-7, 11-2
2022	(Egypt) Hania El Hammamy	(Egypt) Nouran Gohar	11–9, 11–7, 8–11, 11–4
2023	(Egypt) Nour El Sherbini	(Egypt) Nouran Gohar	11–9, 11–7, 11–1
2024	(Egypt) Nouran Gohar	(Egypt) Nour El Sherbini	11–6, 17–15, 3–11, 7–11, 11–4
2025	(Egypt) Nouran Gohar	(Egypt) Nour El Sherbini	9-11, 12-10, 7-11, 13-11, 11-4
2026	(Egypt) Amina Orfi	(Egypt) Nour El Sherbini	7-11, 11-8, 11-5, 11-8

=== By number of victories ===
Rank	Player Name	No. of Titles	Runner-up	Final Appearances
1	(Australia) Heather McKay	16	0	16
2	(England) Janet Morgan	10	2	12
3	(New Zealand) Susan Devoy	8	0	8
4	(Australia) Michelle Martin	6	0	6
5	(Malaysia) Nicol David	5	2	7
6	(England) Margot Lumb	5	1	6
7	(Egypt) Nour El Sherbini	4	3	7
7	(Australia) Vicki Cardwell	4	1	5
7	(Australia) Rachael Grinham	4	1	5
10	(England) Nancy Cave	3	6	9
11	(Egypt) Nouran Gohar	3	4	7
12	(England) Joyce Cave	3	3	6
12	(England) Joan Curry	3	3	6
14	(England) Cecily Fenwick	3	2	5
15	(England) Susan Noel	3	1	4
16	(Australia) Sarah Fitz-Gerald	2	3	5
17	(England) Laura Massaro	2	2	4
18	(New Zealand) Leilani Joyce	2	0	2
19	(England) Sheila Macintosh	1	5	6
19	(England) Fran Marshall	1	5	6
21	(England) Lisa Opie	1	4	5
22	(Australia) Barbara Wall	1	1	2
22	(Australia) Sue Newman	1	1	2
22	(France) Camille Serme	1	1	2
25	(Egypt) Hania El Hammamy	1	0	1
25	(England) Silvia Huntsman	1	0	1
27	(England) Sheila McKechnie (nee Keith-Jones)	0	3	3
27	(England) Anna Craven-Smith	0	3	3
27	(England) Sue Cogswell	0	3	3
27	(England) Martine Le Moignan	0	3	3
27	(Australia) Liz Irving	0	3	3
32	(England) Anne Lytton-Milbanke	0	2	2
32	(England) Ruth Turner	0	2	2
32	(England) Suzanne Horner	0	2	2
32	(England) Sue Wright	0	2	2
32	(England) Cassie Campion	0	2	2
37	(Egypt) Raneem El Welily	0	1	1
37	(England) Sarah-Jane Perry	0	1	1
37	(United States) Natalie Grainger	0	1	1
37	(Republic of Ireland) Madeline Perry	0	1	1
37	(England) Alice Teague	0	1	1
37	(England) Marjorie Townsend	0	1	1
37	(Australia) Bev Johnson	0	1	1
37	(South Africa) Marcia Roche	0	1	1
37	(Australia) Jenny Irving	0	1	1
37	(South Africa) Kathy Malan	0	1	1
37	(New Zealand) Cecilie Fleming	0	1	1
37	(Australia) Marion Jackman	0	1	1
37	(Australia) Margaret Zachariah	0	1	1
37	(England) Lucy Soutter	0	1	1
37	(Australia) Carol Owens	0	1	1
37	(England) Tania Bailey	0	1	1
37	(Australia) Natalie Grinham	0	1	1
37	(England) Jenny Duncalf	0	1	1

=== By country ===
Champions		Runner-up	
England	36	England	62
Australia	34	Australia	16
New Zealand	10	Egypt	10
Egypt	9	Malaysia	2
Malaysia	5	South Africa	2
France	1	New Zealand	1
United States	0	United States	1
South Africa	0	France	1
Ireland	0	Ireland	1

== Records ==
Record	Player(s)	Count	Winning years
Men
Winner of most Men's titles	(Pakistan) Jahangir Khan	10	1982, 1983, 1984, 1985, 1986, 1987, 1988, 1989, 1990, 1991
Winner of most consecutive Men's titles	(Pakistan) Jahangir Khan	10	1982, 1983, 1984, 1985, 1986, 1987, 1988, 1989, 1990, 1991
Women
Winner of most Women's titles	(Australia) Heather McKay	16	1962, 1963, 1964, 1965, 1966, 1967, 1968, 1969, 1970, 1971, 1972, 1973, 1974, 1975, 1976, 1977
Winner of most consecutive Women's titles	(Australia) Heather McKay	16	1962, 1963, 1964, 1965, 1966, 1967, 1968, 1969, 1970, 1971, 1972, 1973, 1974, 1975, 1976, 1977
Miscellaneous
Loser of most finals (men)	(England) Jim Dear	5	1936, 1937, 1938, 1947, 1948
Loser of most finals (women)	(England) Nancy Cave	6	1922, 1923, 1925, 1926, 1927, 1931
Lowest-ranked winner (men)	(Colombia) Miguel Ángel Rodríguez	14th	2018
Lowest-ranked winner (women)	(Egypt) Nouran Gohar	7th	2019
Youngest winner (men)	(Pakistan) Jahangir Khan	18 years (& 3 m.)	1982
Youngest winner (women)	(New Zealand) Susan Devoy	20 years (& 3 m.)	1984
Oldest winner (men)	(Pakistan) Hashim Khan	44 years	1958
Oldest winner (women)	(England) Janet Morgan	38 years	1959

== See also ==
- British Grand Prix (squash)
- British Junior Open Squash
- Official Men's Squash World Ranking
- Official Women's Squash World Ranking
