= Abdul Bari (squash player) =

Indian squash player

Abdul Bari was a squash player. He was one of the leading players in India in the 1940s. Bari was a distant cousin of brothers Hashim Khan and Azam Khan, who represented Pakistan and went on to dominate the international squash scene in the 1950s and early 1960s. Bari stayed in Bombay, India after India and Pakistan won independence from Britain. Bari was sponsored to travel to the United Kingdom to compete in the British Open (the effective world championship of the sport at the time), where he finished runner-up in 1950 to the Egyptian player Mahmoud Karim. Two years later in 1952 he became the first Asian to become a professional coach in England when he was appointed by Junior Carlton Club in London. Bari died of a brain haemorrhage in 1954.

== Career ==
Bari was defeated by Karim at the 1950 British Open Squash Championships in London by a 9–3, 9–4, 9–0 margin. Bari lost to Karim again a few months later at the Scottish Championships in four-game match.
