= Hashim Khan =

Pakistani squash player

Personal information
- Born: 1 July 1914 Peshawar, British India, (now Pakistan)
- Died: 18 August 2014 (aged 100) Aurora, Colorado, U.S.
- Height: 5 ft 4 in (163 cm)

Sport
- Country: Pakistan
Medal record
Men's squash
Representing Pakistan
British Open Squash Championships
Gold medal – first place	1951
Gold medal – first place	1952
Gold medal – first place	1953
Gold medal – first place	1954
Gold medal – first place	1955
Gold medal – first place	1956
Silver medal – second place	1957
Gold medal – first place	1958

Hashim Khan SI TQA (Pashto: ہاشم خان; c. 1910 to 1914 – 18 August 2014) was a squash player from Pakistan. He won the British Open Squash Championships (the then de facto world championship) a total of seven times, from 1951 to 1956, and then again in 1958. Khan was the patriarch of the Khan squash family of Pakistan, which dominated the sport from the 1950s through the 1980s.

== Early life ==
Hashim Khan was born in Nawakille, a small village near Peshawar in modern-day Pakistan, to an ethnic Pashtun family, between 1910 and 1914. Hashim was the second cousin of the two other leading Pakistani players of his time Roshan Khan and Nasrullah Khan, whose sons Rehmat Khan, Torsam Khan and Jahangir Khan are also squash players. Hashim Khan's exact birthdate is unknown. According to his family members, he turned 100 on 1 July 2014 (the family celebrated his birthday on 1 July). Khan's father, Abdullah Khan was chief steward at a British officers' club in Peshawar. He brought Hashim when he was 8 to the squash courts which were used by military men to relax, when not performing duties. Khan's father died in a car accident when he was 11, and he left school to become a ball boy, fetching balls for the squash players. and cleaner of the squash courts. "For sweeping the place, they paid me four annas a day," Khan told the New York Times in 1957. "One anna is a sixteenth part of a rupee. Two hundred and eighty rupees equal one American dollar as of March, 2025.

== Career ==
Hashim Khan's father, Abdullah Khan, was the Head Steward at a club in Peshawar where British army officers stationed in the area played squash. As a youngster, Khan served as an unpaid ball boy at the club, retrieving balls that were hit out of court by the officers. When the officers had finished playing, Khan and the other ball boys would take over the courts. In 1942, Khan became a squash coach at a British Air Force officers' mess. In 1944, he won the first All-of-India squash championship in Bombay, and successfully defended this title for the next two years. After the independence of Pakistan in 1947, he was appointed a squash professional at the Pakistan Air Force, and won the first Pakistani squash championship in 1949.

In 1950, Abdul Bari, a distant cousin of Khan's who had chosen to remain in Bombay after the Partition of India in 1947, and who Hashim had beaten in several tournaments in India before partition, was sponsored by the Indian Government to play at the British Open where he finished runner-up to the Egyptian player Mahmoud Karim. This spurred Khan to seek backing to compete in the British Open the following year. In 1951, when Khan was in his 30s, the government of Pakistan – particularly the Pakistan Air Force – sponsored him for the British Squash Championship. It was the first time Hashim Khan wore shoes on the squash court. Khan travelled to the United Kingdom to play in the British Open, and won the title beating Mahmoud Karim in the final 9–5, 9–0, 9–0. He again beat Karim in the final in 1952 9–5, 9–7, 9–0. He won the tournament for the next four consecutive years, beating R.B.R. Wilson of England in the 1953 final; his younger brother Azam Khan in two tight five-set finals in 1954 and 1955; and Roshan Khan in the final of 1956. Hashim Khan was runner-up to Roshan Khan in 1957, and won his seventh and final British Open title in 1958, when he beat Azam Khan in the final. Hashim Khan also won five British Professional Championship titles, three US Open titles, and three Canadian Open titles.

Hashim Khan relocated to the USA in the 1960s, after being invited to teach squash at the Uptown Athletic Club in Detroit. Eventually Khan settled in Denver, Colorado, but continued to appear in veterans' matches at the British Open. The Denver Athletic Club continues to hold a Hashim Khan squash tournament in his honour every year.

== Personal life ==
Hashim Khan had a total of 12 children. His eldest son Sharif Khan became a player on the North American hardball squash circuit in the 1970s, winning a record 12 North American Open titles. Six other sons – Aziz, Gulmast, Liaqat Ali ("Charlie"), Salim ("Sam"), Shaukat, and Mo – also became hardball squash players.

His granddaughter Maria Khan plays professional soccer.

== British Open final appearances ==
Wins (7)
Year	Opponent in final	Score in final
1951	Mahmoud Karim	9–5, 9–0, 9–0
1952	Mahmoud Karim	9–5, 9–7, 9–0
1953	R.B.R. Wilson	9–2, 8–10, 9–1, 9–0
1954	Azam Khan	6–9, 9–6, 9–6, 7–9, 9–5
1955	Azam Khan	9–7, 7–9, 9–7, 5–9, 9–7
1956	Roshan Khan	9–4, 9–2, 5–9, 9–5
1958	Azam Khan	9–7, 6–9, 9–6, 9–7
Runners-up (1)
Year	Opponent in final	Score in final
1957	Roshan Khan	6–9, 9–5, 9–2, 9–1

== Awards and recognition ==
- Pride of Performance Award by the President of Pakistan in 1958
- Tamgha-e-Quaid-e-Azam by the Government of Pakistan in 1959
- Sitara-i-Imtiaz (Star of Excellence) Award by the Government of Pakistan in 2008

== Death and legacy ==
On 18 August 2014, Khan died in his home in Aurora, Colorado due to congestive heart failure. He was widely believed to be 100 years old.

Hashim Khan was known for his sportsmanship spirit. Showing respect for other players, he always allowed his opponents to leave the court first.

=== Condolences and tributes ===
The World Squash Federation President Narayana Ramachandran paid a tribute to Hashim Khan, "After a wonderfully long and active life we are now left with memories of a great champion, a great man who has made a wonderful contribution to squash. Hashim's passing has taken somebody so special from us. As we remember him we send our condolences and best wishes to his family at this very sad time," he said.

Pakistan Squash Federation President Air Chief Marshal Tahir Rafique Butt expressed grief over his death and remembered him for his achievements.

Other Pakistani players like Jahangir Khan, Qamar Zaman and officials like the Prime Minister of Pakistan Nawaz Sharif and Pakistani President also offered condolences and commended Hashim Khan. "Within the game, he was an iconic player, arguably the greatest player ever," said James Zug, a leading historian of Squash. In Pakistan, Hashim Khan was a hero and a symbol of national pride. In 2020, Google celebrated him with a Google Doodle.
