= Mahmoud Karim =

Egyptian squash player

Mahmoud el Karim (1916–1999) was a squash player from Egypt. He won the British Open men's title four consecutive times from 1947–1950.

== Playing career ==
Karim first played golf and tennis at the Gezira Sporting Club in Cairo before discovering squash at the age of 15. He enjoyed it so much that he came to devote all his time to the sport.

In 1947, Karim captured the British Open title for the first time. The 1947 final was the last occasion when the British Open was decided in a best-of-three-matches contest between the two finalists. Karim beat England's Jim Dear 9-4, 9-1, 9-3 in the first match and 5–9, 7–9, 9–8, 9–7, 9–4 in the second match. In 1948 Karim again faced Dear in the British Open final, this time in a single match to determine the champion which Karim won 9–5, 9–3, 5–9, 1–9, 10–8. Karim beat Brian Phillips in the 1949 final 9–4, 9–2, 9–10, 9–4. In 1950, Karim beat Abdul Bari of India in the final 9–4, 9–2, 9–7.

Karim was also runner-up at the British Open in 1951 and 1952, losing in the final on both occasions to Pakistan's Hashim Khan.

Excerpt from The Squash Rackets Association Handbook 1950-51 Affiliated Associations and Overseas Reports Australia "The year was without doubt the most outstanding in the history of the association, being dominated by the visitof Mahmoud Kerim, holder of the British and Egyptian open championships and accepted as the finest squash rackets player in the world at present. The Egyptian S.R.A. made the very generous offer of a contribution of half the cost of the return air fare and the Gezira Sporting Club, to which Karim is attached, strongly supported the idea and granted him leave of absence for the tour. Although an outlay of over 500 pounds would be involved and the associations funds at the time stood at about 80 pounds, the executive in inviting Karim were certain of the support of squash followers and of the considerable value in every way of the visit to the game here in Australia. The outcome exceeded even the optimistic expectations of the executive. The presence of this outstanding player created tremendous interest in the sporting world and gave great impetus to the game. Karim played a number of exhibition games in Victoria and New South Wales and won both the professional and open championships of Australia. The Australian championships were conducted in Victoria on the courts of the South Yarra Club. In the final of the Professional Championship, G.J Watson had an excellent opportunity of scoring over our visitor M.A.Karim, when he led eight-three in the fifth game of the final of the professional championship. Karim, however, staged a thrilling finish to win the match. The results were: M.A.Karim (Egypt) beat G.J.Watson (Australia), 4-9,9-0,4-9,9-2,10-8. Karim gave an outstanding display in taking the title from Watson." Following the game, Karim presented his winning racket to Eric Vincent, secretary of this association, who was instrumental in arranging the visit of Karim to Australia.

== Coaching career ==
After retiring as a player, Karim moved to Montreal, Quebec, Canada, and became a squash coach. He then moved to London, Ontario and coached at the All-Canadian club to coach Caleb Quinlan. He moved back to Egypt at the age of 72 and became Director of Squash at the Gezira Club.

Karim died on September 9, 1999, at the age of 83.
