= Richard Hawkey =

English cricketer and squash player

Personal information
- Full name: Richard Bladworth Hawkey
- Born: 7 August 1923; Teddington, Middlesex, England
- Died: 19 March 1991 (aged 67); Hillingdon, Middlesex, England
- Batting: Right-handed
- Bowling: Right-arm medium

Career statistics
Competition	First-class
Matches	3
Runs scored	42
Batting average	7.00
100s/50s	–/–
Top score	13
Balls bowled	288
Wickets	1
Bowling average	139.00
5 wickets in innings	–
10 wickets in match	–
Best bowling	1/40
Catches/stumpings	-/-
- Source: Cricinfo, 25 December 2018

Richard Bladworth Hawkey (7 August 1923 – 19 March 1991) was an English first-class cricketer and squash player.

Born at Teddington, Hawkey was educated at Merchant Taylors' School. Going up to the University of Cambridge, Hawkey made his debut in first-class cricket for the Free Foresters against Cambridge University in 1948. The following year he played two first-class matches for Cambridge University against the touring New Zealanders and Warwickshire, both played at Fenner's. He scored 42 runs and took a single wicket across his three first-class matches. Besides playing cricket, he was also an international squash player, representing England. He also wrote a number of coaching books on the subject. He died at Hillingdon in March 1991.
