= Jim Dear =

English racquets, court tennis, and squash player

James Patrick St. George Dear MBE (1910–1981) was an English racquets, court tennis, and squash player who effectively won world titles in three different sports during the 1930s, 1940s and 1950s.

== Personal life ==
Dear was born in Fulham, London in 1910. He died in Windsor, Berkshire on 7 November 1981, at the age of 71.

== Rackets ==
Dear won the Rackets World Championships from 1947 to 1954, losing the title to Geoffrey Atkins.

== Real tennis ==
He also won the Real tennis world championship from 1955 to 1957.

== Squash ==
Dear won the most prestigious title in squash, the British Open, in 1939, at a time when there was no official world championship and the British Open champion was acknowledged as the world's best. Dear was also the runner-up at the competition three times in the 1930s and twice in the late-1940s.

== Awards ==
He was among seven British world champions honored at the inaugural Sports Writers' Association - which later became the Sports Journalists' Association in 1949.

Dear was appointed Member of the Order of the British Empire (MBE) in the 1960 New Year Honours, for services to tennis and rackets.

== See also ==
- Real tennis world champions
- British Open Squash Championships
