= Roshan Khan =

Pakistani squash player

Roshan Khan (Pashto / Urdu: روشن خان; 26 November 1929 – 6 January 2006) was a squash player from Nawakille, Peshawar, Pakistan. He was one of the leading players in the game in the early 1960s, and won the British Open title in 1957.

His son Jahangir Khan became the world's leading squash player in the 1980s and has been recognized as the greatest squash player of all time.

== Career ==
In 1949, Roshan finished runner-up to Hashim at the inaugural Pakistan Open. He went on to win that title three consecutive times between 1951 and 1953.

In 1956, Roshan faced Hashim in the final of the British Open (which was considered to be the effective world championship of the sport at the time), with Hashim winning 9–4, 9–2, 5–9, 9–5. In 1957, the following year the pair met again in the British Open final, and this time Roshan won 6–9, 9–5, 9–2, 9–1 to end Hashim's six-year reign as champion. Roshan made a third British Open final appearance in 1960, when he lost to Azam 9–1, 9–0, 9–0.

Roshan also won the US Open three times and the Canadian Open twice.

Hailing from Pashtun family from Nawekalli, Peshawar, Roshan had three sons – Torsam Khan, Hassan Khan and Jahangir Khan – both Torsam and Jahangir were groomed by Roshan to become top international squash players. Torsam reached a career-high ranking on World No. 13 in 1979, when he died of a heart attack while playing a tournament match in Australia at the age of 27. In the wake of Torsam's death, Jahangir considered quitting the game, but instead decided to pursue a career in the sport as a tribute to his brother. He went on to achieve unprecedented heights within the game – capturing ten British Open titles, six World Open titles, and enjoying a five-year unbeaten run which stretched to over 500 matches. He was the brother of Nasrullah Khan and uncle of Rehmat Khan.

Roshan was the second cousin of the two other leading Pakistani players of his time – the brothers Hashim Khan and Azam Khan. He was also connected to them by marriage – Roshan's brother-in-law was married to the sister of Hashim and Azam's.

== Awards and recognition ==
- Pride of Performance Award by the President of Pakistan in 1960.

== Death ==
Roshan Khan died on 6 January 2006 in Karachi.

== British Open final appearances ==
Wins (1)
Year	Opponent in final	Score in final
1957	Hashim Khan	6–9, 9–5, 9–2, 9–1
Runners-up (2)
Year	Opponent in final	Score in final
1956	Hashim Khan	9–4, 9–2, 5–9, 9–5
1960	Azam Khan	9–1, 9–0, 9–0
