= Azam Khan (squash player) =

Pakistani squash player (1926–2020)

Personal information
- Born: 20 April 1926 Nawakille, Peshawar
- Died: 28 March 2020 (aged 93) London, England

Sport
- Country: Pakistan
- Coached by: Hashim Khan
- Retired: 1962
- Highest ranking: British Open Squash Champion (Four consecutive titles from 1959 to 1962)
- Title: British Open Squash Champion from 1959 to 1962
Medal record
Pride of Performance Award by the Government of Pakistan (1961)

Azam Khan (Pashto: اعظم خان; 20 April 1926 – 28 March 2020) was a Pakistani squash player who won the British Open Championships four times, from 1959 to 1962.

== Early life and family ==
Azam Khan was born into a Pashtun family at Nawakville, a small village near Peshawar, Pakistan, on 20 April 1926. At first, he became a tennis coach at the officers' club of the Pakistan Air Force. Soon after that, his older brother Hashim Khan who was 11 years older and was almost like a father figure to him, who also would go on to win seven British titles later in his career, asked him to change careers to playing squash instead of tennis. When Azam Khan switched over to playing squash, he was such a quick learner that he became the second best player behind his famous brother Hashim Khan within six months. Azam Khan was widely considered one of the world's best shot-makers and game strategists.

Both brothers had settled in London by 1956. Azam Khan surprised many people by adapting so easily from concrete courts in Pakistan to England's wooden court floors. He also showed a lot of respect for his older brother and mentor Hashim Khan and always tried not to outshine him, when playing against him. As Sports Illustrated magazine noted, it was "foolish for a Khan to try to outfox a Khan." Azam Khan had a reputation for playing with steely determination. During his long career, one day in 1962 when he was playing in long trousers and a sweater, he had an accident and collapsed with a torn tendon. Both this injury and the death of his 14-year-old son of chest and brain problems within a year slowed him down and he decided to retire from the game in 1962.

His older brother Hashim Khan and granddaughter Carla Khan were also squash players.

Azam Khan was the second cousin of the two other leading Pakistani players of his time Roshan Khan and Nasrullah Khan, whose sons Rehmat Khan, Torsam Khan and the great Jahangir Khan are also squash players. He was the uncle of Sharif Khan and Aziz Khan.

== Reception ==
Jonah Barrington, the six times British Open Champion, writes in his book, Murder in Squash Court, that in 1967, a fortnight before the start of British Open, his coach Nasrullah Khan took him to his club and requested him for a match/practice session against Azam Khan. Wherein, he scored only one point in three games. Totally shaken, he requested him for another session but the next day, too, he could not improve on it and once again scored only one point against Azam. Only three weeks later, Barrington writes that he won the first of his Six British Open titles. In 1967, when Barrington won a total of two points in as many sessions against Azam Khan, the latter was 48 years old and had left professional squash in 1962.

In his article for international Squash Player Magazine Ejaz Choudhry states that "he was a great player in his own right, but for two reasons, respect for his elder brother and the loss of his son coupled with the fear of injury Azam might have been the greatest squash player of all times. Perhaps he was, In a recent book "Trading Secrets" he does admit that the first time he beat his brother was with his permission, in line with the respect of the family elders, ingrained in Pushtoon culture.

== Death ==
Azam Khan died at the age of 93 on 28 March 2020, after being infected by COVID-19 in London, during the COVID-19 pandemic.

Azam Khan's wife had died some years before he did. One of his sons had died in 1963 at age 14 only. Among the survivors are his eight remaining children.

== British Open final appearances ==
Wins (4)
Year	Opponent in final	Score in final
1959	Mo Khan	9–5, 9–0, 9-1
1960	Roshan Khan	9–1, 9–0, 9-0
1961	Mo Khan	6–9, 9–1, 9–4, 0–9, 9-2
1962	Mo Khan	9–6, 7–9, 10–8, 2–9, 9-4
Runners-up (3)
Year	Opponent in final	Score in final
1954	Hashim Khan	6–9, 9–6, 9–6, 7–9, 9-5
1955	Hashim Khan	9–7, 7–9, 9–7, 5–9, 9-7
1958	Hashim Khan	9–7, 6–9, 9–6, 9-7

== Awards and recognition ==
- Pride of Performance Award by the Government of Pakistan in 1961.
