= Lansdowne Club =

Private club in Mayfair, London, England

Coordinates: 51.5083°N 0.1451°W

The Lansdowne Club
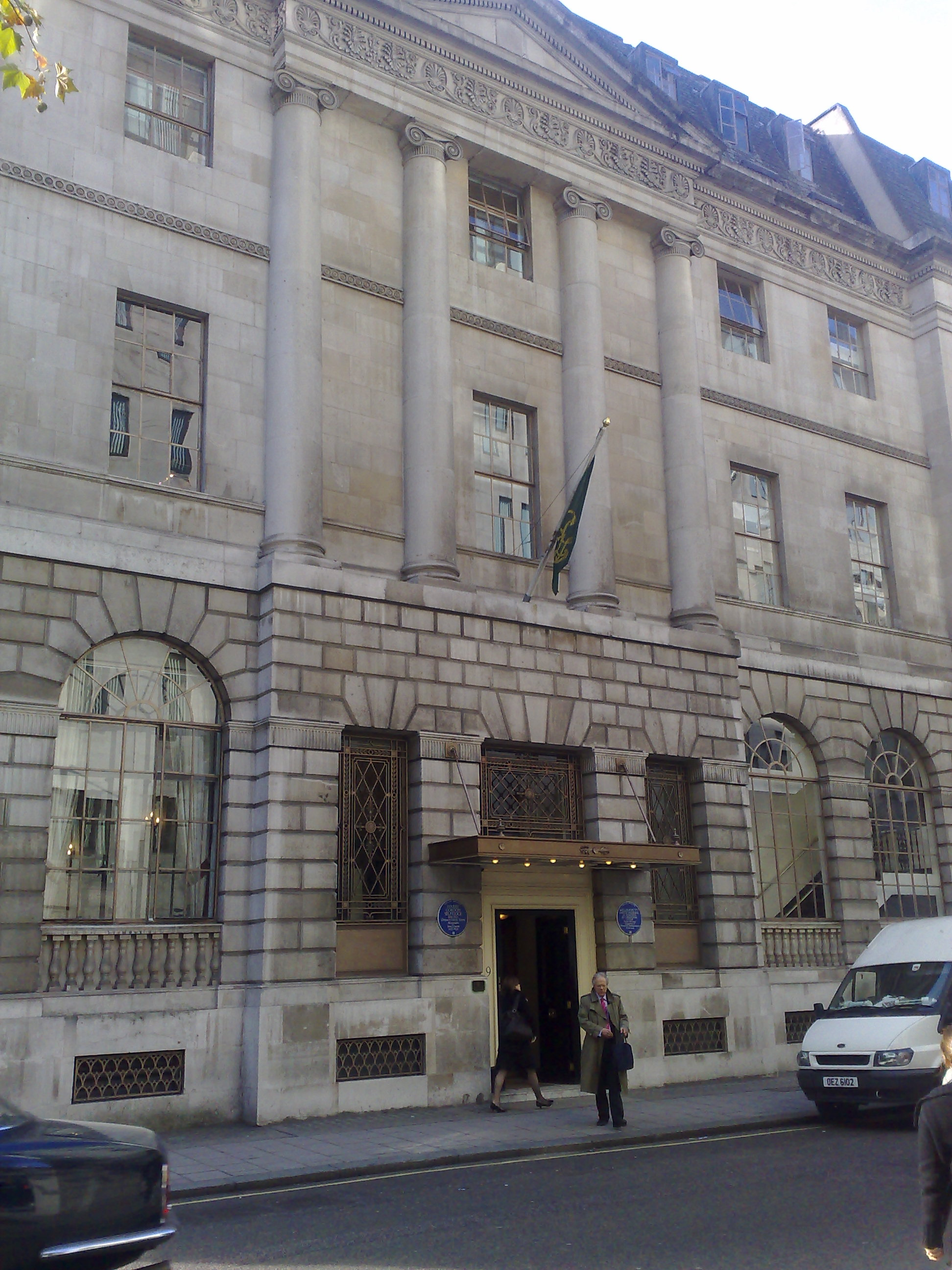
- Founded: 1935
- Location: 9 Fitzmaurice Place, London
- Website: www.lansdowneclub.com

The Lansdowne Club is a private members' club in London, England occupying a large building, which is notable in its own right. It was established in 1935 and occupies most of 9 Fitzmaurice Place, which connects Berkeley Square to Curzon Street in Mayfair.

== History ==
The club formed later than many London clubs, and it permitted women from its inception. It has always had a relatively young membership, with an active social scene. The building's main Adam and otherwise 1930s Art Deco interiors, with some authentic frontages, mean it has been Grade II* listed since its first assessment in 1970. This is the mid-category of listed building, a statutory scheme of protection which has a pyramidal hierarchy.

In 1930, Westminster City Council decided to improve access to Berkeley Square by creating an extra road into the square. This was accomplished by demolishing half of the main range of Lansdowne House, which stood since the 1760s. What remained was given a new frontage and a newly renovated interior, and became the Lansdowne Club. The 'First Drawing Room' was thus taken to the Philadelphia Museum of Art, and the 'Dining Room' exists in the Metropolitan Museum of Art in New York City.

The venue was founded as a 'social, residential and athletic Club for members of social standing' and their families, and, unlike many of its rivals, had no vocational, artistic, or political requirements. Its facilities include a ballroom, a terrace, a fencing Salle and a basement gym with Art Deco swimming pool.

Internally, the architecture is extremely unusual: some was modern for its type, and significantly Art Deco as opposed to Georgian/Victorian/Edwardian styles. The Adam Room and other parts of the club on the ground-floor are Georgian in style.

The building underwent extensive renovation and further modernisation in 2000.

== Members past and present ==
- Richard Dimbleby
- Beryl Cook
- John Bly
- Luke Fildes (fencer)
- Ian Campbell-Gray
- Loyd Grossman
- James Mason
- Charles Arnold-Baker
- Terry Beddard
- Mary Glen-Haig
- Desmond Flower, 10th Viscount Ashbrook
- Archibald Craig
- Bill Hoskyns
- Baroness Butler-Sloss
- Peter Alliss
- John Emrys Lloyd
- Tony Calvert, founder of the Terrence Higgins Trust
- Nick Halsted
- Catherine Herridge
- Paul Smith (fashion designer)
- Elizabeth Blackadder
- Allan Jay
- Merlin Hanbury-Tracy, 7th Baron Sudeley
- Joachim von Ribbentrop (before the outbreak of World War II)
- Tim Richardson (writer)
- Rainier III, Prince of Monaco and Grace Kelly were honorary members, whose son Albert II, Prince of Monaco took fencing lessons there

== Chairmen ==
- 1935–40 F. Howard Humphies Esq
- 1940–54 Sir Frederick Arnold-Baker
- 1954–57 Clarence Napier Bruce, 3rd Baron Aberdare
- 1957 (interim) Morys Bruce, 4th Baron Aberdare
- 1957–63 P. D. Krolik Esq
- 1963–67 J. Fletcher Esq
- 1967–88 C. G. Findlay Esq
- 1988–97 J. R. M. Keatley Esq
- 1998–2006 J. Moore
- 2006–10 D. Whitehouse Esq
- 2010–14 C. Powell Esq
- 2014–15 D. Prince Esq
- 2015–18 D. Whitehouse Esq
- 2018–19 J. North Esq
- 2019–20 M. Dixon Esq
- 2020–21 K. Hollender Esq
- 2021-22 K. O'Flynn
- 2022-25 J. Dobson Esq
- 2025-present N. Skinner Esq

== Past fencing masters ==
Fencing was established as part of the Lansdowne Club in November 1935 by a group of fencers who moved there from the Royal Automobile Club and the Club boasts a historic salle d'armes that was featured in Darling (1965 film). Over the years the fencing masters have included:

- Monsieur Vollands
- Professor Foucheyrand with assistant coach Mr Richards
- Alfred Parkins
- John Parkins
- Jeremy Parkins
- Ziemowit Wojciechowski
- Steven Paul (fencer)
- Pierre Harper

== See also ==
- List of London's gentlemen's clubs
