= 1938 Women's British Open Squash Championship =

British Open Squash Championships
- 17th Women's British Open Championships

Details
- Location: London, England
- Venue: Queen's Club, West Kensington

The 1938 Ladies Open Championships was held at the Queen's Club, West Kensington, in London from 2–7 February 1938.
Margot Lumb won her fourth consecutive title by defeating Mrs Sheila McKechnie in a repeat of the 1937 final. This fourth win set a new record, surpassing the three wins of Joyce Cave, Nancy Cave, Cecily Fenwick and Susan Noel.

== Seeds ==
1. (England) Margot Lumb
2. (England) Hon Miss Anne Lytton-Milbanke
3. (England) Sheila McKechnie
4. (England) Betty Cooke

== Draw and results ==
=== First round ===
Player one	Player two	Score
(England) Margot Lumb +		bye
(England) Mrs Sheila McKechnie +		bye
(England) Miss T King		bye
(England) Miss S Wilson		bye
(England) Mrs S M Green		bye
(England) Miss Joyce Dudley-Cox		bye
(England) Miss Olga Klingenberg		bye
(England) Mrs H Langman		bye
(England) Hon Miss Anne Lytton-Milbanke +	(England) Mrs P Johnston	9–2 9–4 9–1
(England) Miss Betty Cooke +	(England) Miss U N Harris	9–1 9–0 9–5
(England) Lady Katharine Cairns	(England) Mrs Stella Blaxland-Levick	9–4 9–1 9–1
(England) Miss Elizabeth Knox	(England) Mrs Violet St Clair Morford	9–4 9–6 9–1
(England) Mrs Margaret Dawnay	(England) Miss M Grant	9–4 9–4 9–3
(England) Mrs Alice Teague	(England) Miss C Douglas	9–4 9–2 9–3
(England) Miss I Leach	(England) Mrs Phyllis Philcox	6–9 6–9 9–3 10–8 9–6
(England) Mrs E P Sewell	(England) Sylvia Huntsman	10–8 9–6 9–3
(England) Mrs H J Stribling	(England) Mrs E A Barker	5–9 9–2 9–1 9–1
(England) Miss M Riddell	(England) Miss Ursula Foljambe	w/o
(England) Miss D C Wilcox	(England) Mrs E G Chalmers	9–5 9–1 9–3
(England) Miss P L Hervey	(England) Miss S Link	w/o
(England) Miss Berenice Lumb	(England) Miss Joan Huntsman	9–4 9–1 9–1
(England) Mrs R W M Wetherell	(England) Miss D F Cearns	5–9 10–9 9–3 7–9 9–4
(England) Mrs Penelope Durlac	(England) Miss M H Palmer	5–9 9–0 10–9 9–6
(England) Mrs W D Porter	(England) Mrs Pratt	9–3 9–1 9–2
(England) Miss N L Kelman	(England) Miss E Brett	9–6 9–6 10–8
(England) Miss S P Brown	(England) Mrs Fielding-Johnson	w/o
(England) Miss K Steele	(England) Miss K B Jackson	9–1 9–3 9–4
(England) Mrs D M Sinclair	(England) Miss A Manning	w/o
(England) Mrs A I Knox	(England) Miss B J Blanks	9–5 9–0 9–3
(England) Miss Elizabeth Glascock	(England) Miss E I Caldwell	9–2 9–5 10–8
(England) Mrs A Vickers	(England) Miss S C Palmer	9–1 9–3 3–9 9–5
(England) Mrs L E Lefevre	(England) Miss M Burnell	9–6 9–6 9–2

+ denotes seed

=== Second round ===
Player one	Player two	Score
(England) Lumb M	(England) Wilson	9–0 9–0 9–2
(England) Lytton-M	(England) Lumb B	9–0 9–3 9–0
(England) McKechnie	(England) Klingenberg	9–0 9–1 9–0
(England) Cooke	(England) Wetherell	9–1 9–5 9–7
(England) Cairns	(England) Durlac	10–9 9–3 9–4
(England) Knox E	(England) Porter	9–4 9–3 9–0
(England) Dawnay	(England) Kelman	9–5 9–7 9–5
(England) Teague	(England) Brown	9–1 9–3 9–4
(England) King	(England) Langman	9–1 9–4 9–0
(England) Leach	(England) Steele	9–5 9–5 10–8
(England) Sewell	(England) Sinclair	w/o
(England) Stribling	(England) Knox A	9–1 9–4 9–5
(England) Riddell	(England) Glascock	6–9 9–5 9–1 9–4
(England) Wilcox	(England) Vickers	9–6 9–5 9–7
(England) Hervey	(England) Lefevre	9–0 5–9 9–5 6–9 9–5
(England) Green	(England) Dudley-Cox	9–3 9–1 9–0

=== Third round ===
Player one	Player two	Score
(England) Lumb	(England) Green	9–6 9–2 9–0
(England) McKechnie	(England) King	9–3 9–2 9–3
(England) Lytton-M	(England) Stribling	9–2 9–1 9–1
(England) Cooke	(England) Riddell	9–5 9–1 9–6
(England) Knox	(England) Hervey	9–1 9–4 9–0
(England) Teague	(England) Leach	9–5 9–0 9–0
(England) Dawnay	(England) Sewell	9–5 9–7 9–4
(England) Cairns	(England) Wilcox	9–6 9–7 9–1

=== Quarter-finals ===
Player one	Player two	Score
(England) Lumb	(England) Knox	9–0 9–1 9–2
(England) McKechnie	(England) Teague	9–4 6–9 9–6 9–3
(England) Lytton-M	(England) Dawnay	9–0 9–3 9–5
(England) Cooke	(England) Cairns	9–4 9–5– 9–0

=== Semi-finals ===
Player one	Player two	Score
(England) Lumb	(England) Cooke	9–1 9–4 6–9 9–3
(England) McKechnie	(England) Lytton-M	9–4 6–9 9–3 9–0

=== Final ===
Player one	Player two	Score
(England) Lumb	(England) McKechnie	9–3 9–2 9–1

Preceded by 1937	British Open Squash Championships; England (London); 1938	Succeeded by 1939
