= 1929 Women's British Open Squash Championship =

British Open Squash Championships
- 8th Women's British Open Championships

Details
- Location: London, England
- Venue: Queen's Club, West Kensington

The 1929 Ladies Open Championships was held at the Queen's Club, West Kensington in London from 23–28 January 1929.
Nancy Cave won her second title defeating her sister Joyce Cave in the final.

== Draw and results ==
First Round
(England) Miss Nancy Cave	9	10	9
(England) Mrs Hilary Stebbing	0	1	4
(England) Mrs Hartley	9	9	9
(England) Miss E C Mogg	2	1	1
(England) Miss Cecily Fenwick
(England) Miss Rothschild	w/o
(England) Mrs Elizabeth Bryans-Wolfe	9	9	9
(England) Mrs J Naylor	0	0	0
(England) Hon Mrs Margaret Bruce	9	9	10
(England) Mrs Davidson	3	3	8
(England) Lady Olive Smith-Dorrien	9	9	9
(England) Mrs Miller	2	3	3
(England) Miss W Haywood
bye
(England) Miss K M Crispe	1	2	6
(England) Mrs Judith Backhouse	9	9	9
(England) Miss Joyce Cave	w/o
(England) Miss V B Daniell
(England) Miss Elizabeth Foster	9	9	9
(England) Miss Joan Huntsman	4	3	5
(England) Miss A Blake	9	9	9
(England) Mrs L Somerville	1	0	4
(England) Miss E Fordham	2	9	9	9
(England) Miss C Vickers	9	4	3	3
(England) Miss Sylvia Huntsman	9	9	9
(England) Miss D Watson	1	5	1
(England) Miss Phyllis Blake	w/o
(England) Miss S Else
(England) Miss Susan Noel	9	9	9
(England) Miss M Fraser	6	7	0
(England) Mrs Marion Crispe	9	7	9	9
(England) Mrs Dorothy Crouch	7	9	4	4

Second Round
(England) Cave N	8	9	9	9
(England) Hartley	10	7	0	2
(England) Fenwick	9	9	9
(England) Bryans-Wolfe	4	0	1
(England) Bruce	1	9	2	10	9
(England) Smith-Dorrien	9	7	9	8	5
(England) Haywood	4	10	9	9
(England) Backhouse	9	8	4	2
(England) Cave J	9	9	10
(England) Foster	2	3	8
(England) Blake A	9	6	10	9
(England) Fordham	3	9	8	4
(England) Huntsman S	9	9	9
(England) Blake P	6	3	1
(England) Noel	9	9	9
(England) Crispe	0	4	6

Quarter Finals
(England) Cave N	10	9	9
(England) Fenwick	8	6	2
(England) Bruce	w/o
(England) Haywood
(England) Cave J	9	9	9
(England) Blake A	2	0	0
(England) Huntsman S	8	9	9	9
(England) Noel	10	4	5	7

Semi-finals
(England) Cave N	9	9	9
(England) Bruce	0	0	3
Final
(England) Cave N	9	3	9	3	9
(England) Cave J	6	9	2	9	6
(England) Cave J	0	9	9	9
(England) Huntsman	9	4	0	4

Preceded by 1928	British Open Squash Championships; England (London); 1929	Succeeded by 1930
