= 1928 Women's British Open Squash Championship =

British Open Squash Championships
- 7th Women's British Open Championships

Details
- Location: London, England
- Venue: Queen's Club, West Kensington

The 1928 Ladies Open Championships was held at the Queen's Club, West Kensington in London from 24–29 January 1928.
Joyce Cave won her third title defeating Cecily Fenwick in the final. The championship was switched to a straight knockout format replacing the group format previously used. Joyce Cave returned after missing the two previous tournaments but Nancy Cave could not compete due to illness. Joyce Cave was still unable to compete due to a wrist injury.

== Draw and results ==
First Round
(England) Miss Joyce Cave	9	10	9
(England) Mrs Urwick	1	8	1
(England) Miss Imogen Grenfell	9	10	9
(England) Mrs Davidson	2	8	5
(England) Miss C Vickers
bye
(England) Miss E C Mogg
bye
(England) Miss Susan Noel	10	9	9
(England) Miss Stobart	8	0	6
(England) Miss Joan Huntsman	9	9	9
(England) Mrs Elizabath Bryans-Wolfe	1	0	7
(England) Miss Eileen Nicholson	w/o
(England) Mrs Naylor
(England) Mrs Hartley	10	9	2	9
(England) Mrs Maine	8	4	9	2
(England) Miss Cecily Fenwick	9	9	9
(England) Mrs Miller	0	0	1
(England) Mrs Winifred Kittermaster ^{1}	9	2	4	10	9
(England) Mrs Winifred Livingstone-Learmonth	6	9	9	8	7
(England) Miss A Blake
bye
(England) Miss V Wagg
bye
(England) Miss Sylvia Huntsman
(England) Mrs Molly Quetteville	w/o
(England) Lady Olive Smith-Dorrien	9	6	9	9
(England) Mrs Judith Backhouse	2	9	5	3
(England) Miss P Slagg	9	9	5	5	9
(England) Miss M J Hutton	3	2	9	9	6
(England) Mrs Hilary Stebbing	w/o
(England) Miss P Broadbent

Second Round
(England) Cave	9	9	9
(England) Grenfell	2	0	0
(England) Vickers	9	9	9
(England) Mogg	5	0	1
(England) Noel	7	9	9	9
(England) Huntsman J	9	4	4	5
(England) Nicholson	9	10	9
(England) Hartley	6	8	2
(England) Fenwick	9	9	9
(England) Kittermaster	0	0	1
(England) Blake	w/o
(England) Wagg
(England) Huntsman S	9	9	9
(England) Smith-Dorrien	5	3	7
(England) Slagg	9	9	9
(England) Stebbing	4	3	5

Quarter Finals
(England) Cave	9	9	9
(England) Vickers	6	3	0
(England) Noel	8	9	4	9	10
(England) Nicholson	10	6	9	2	8
(England) Fenwick	9	9	9
(England) Blake	2	0	1
(England) Huntsman S	9	9	9
(England) Slagg	5	5	1

Semi-finals
(England) Cave	9	9	10
(England) Noel	5	4	8
Final
(England) Cave	4	9	10	9
(England) Fenwick	9	5	9	6
(England) Fenwick	9	9	9
(England) Huntsman S	6	3	2

=== Notes ===
1 Mrs Winifred Kittermaster (née Miss Winifred Rotherham)

Preceded by 1927	British Open Squash Championships; England (London); 1928	Succeeded by 1929
