= 1925 Women's British Open Squash Championship =

British Open Squash Championships
- 4th Women's British Open Championships

Details
- Location: London, England
- Venue: Queen's Club, West Kensington

The 1925 Ladies Open Championships was held at the Queen's Club, West Kensington in London from 1–7 December 1924.
Joyce Cave won the title defeating her sister Nancy Cave in the final. This championship was held in the 1924 but in the 1924/25 season so is attributed as being the 1925 event.

== Draw and results ==
=== Section A (round robin) ===
Player One	Player Two	Score
(England) Miss Nancy Cave	(England) Miss Joan Huntsman	21-7
(England) Miss Nancy Cave	(England) Hon Mrs Margaret Bruce	21-2
(England) Miss Nancy Cave	(England) Miss A Blake	21-4
(England) Miss Joan Huntsman	(England) Hon Mrs Margaret Bruce	21-11
(England) Miss Joan Huntsman	(England) Miss A Blake	21-10
(England) Hon Mrs Margaret Bruce	(England) Miss A Blake	21-10

=== Section B (round robin) ===
Player One	Player Two	Score
(England) Miss Cecily Fenwick	(England) Miss Sylvia Huntsman	21-13
(England) Miss Cecily Fenwick	(England) Miss Phyllis Blake	21-7
(England) Miss Cecily Fenwick	(England) Mrs Potter	21-0
(England) Miss Sylvia Huntsman	(England) Miss Phyllis Blake	21-7
(England) Miss Sylvia Huntsman	(England) Mrs Potter	21-0
(England) Phyllis Blake	(England) Mrs Potter	21-3

=== Section C (round robin) ===
Player One	Player Two	Score
(England) Miss Joyce Cave	(England) Miss Eileen Nicholson	21-0
(England) Miss Joyce Cave	(England) Miss Susan Noel	21-5
(England) Miss Joyce Cave	(England) Miss F Marshall	21-0
(England) Miss Eileen Nicholson	(England) Miss Susan Noel	21-5
(England) Miss Eileen Nicholson	(England) Miss F Marshall	21-2
(England) Miss Susan Noel	(England) Miss F Marshall	21-8

=== Section D (round robin) ===
Player One	Player Two	Score
(England) Miss Joyce Nicholson	(England) Mrs Winifred Kittermaster +	21-10
(England) Miss Joyce Nicholson	(England) Mrs Molly De Quetteville	21-2
(England) Miss Joyce Nicholson	(England) Mrs Winifred Livingstone-Learmonth	21-0
(England) Mrs Winifred Livingstone-Learmonth	(England) Mrs Winifred Kittermaster +	21-11
(England) Mrs Winifred Livingstone-Learmonth	(England) Mrs Molly De Quetteville	21-6
(England) Mrs Winifred Kittermaster +	(England) Mrs Molly De Quetteville	21-15

=== Second round ===
Player One	Player Two	Score
(England) Miss Nancy Cave	(England) Miss Eileen Nicholson	15-7 15-2
(England) Miss Joyce Cave	(England) Miss Joan Huntsman	15-8 15-11
(England) Miss Sylvia Huntsman	(England) Mrs Winifred Livingstone-Learmonth	15-3 15-4
(England) Miss Cecily Fenwick	(England) Miss Joyce Nicholson	15-0 15-1

=== Semi finals ===
Player One	Player Two	Score
(England) Miss Nancy Cave	(England) Miss Sylvia Huntsman	15-11 15-5
(England) Miss Joyce Cave	(England) Miss Cecily Fenwick	12-15 15-8 15-6

=== Final ===
Player One	Player Two	Score
(England) Miss Joyce Cave	(England) Miss Nancy Cave	15-3 6-15 16-13

=== Notes ===
+ Mrs. Winifred Kittermaster (née Miss Winifred Rotherham)
Susan Noel was only 12 years old during this tournament.

Preceded by 1924	British Open Squash Championships; England (London); 1925	Succeeded by 1926
