= 1932 Women's British Open Squash Championship =

British Open Squash Championships
- 11th Women's British Open Championships

Details
- Location: London, England
- Venue: Queen's Club, West Kensington

The 1932 Ladies Open Championships was held at the Queen's Club, West Kensington in London from 1–6 February 1932.
Susan Noel won her first title defeating Joyce Cave in the final. A record 67 entries were received for the 1932 Open Championship. Three times winners Nancy Cave and Cecily Fenwick were missing because both had retired from competition.

== Draw and results ==
=== First round ===
Player one	Player two	Score
(England) Mrs J Winser	(England) Miss M Fraser	3-9 9-5 9-0 9–4
(England) Mrs Hughes	(England) Miss Marjorie Raphael	9-1 8-10 9-0 9–7

=== Second round ===
Player one	Player two	Score
(England) Susan Noel	(England) Miss H Phillimore	9-0 9-0 9–0
(England) Miss W D Oakes	(England) Mrs Hilary Stebbing	w/o
(England) Miss Elizabeth Knox	(England) Miss N Boucher	9-4 8-10 9-4 9–4
(England) Mrs J Winser	(England) Mrs Hughes	9-1 9-7 10–8
(England) Miss E Fordham	(England) Miss B Pemberton	w/o
(England) Miss M O Cane	(England) Miss P Bristowe	9-6 9-1 7-9 9–6
(England) Miss R Luard	(England) Mrs E Woodforde	9-7 10-8 8-10 8-10 9–0
(England) Miss E C Mogg	(England) Mrs Madeline Chichester	9-7 9-0 4-9 9–4
(England) Hon Miss Anne Lytton-Milbanke	(England) Miss M Page	9-0 9-0 9–1
(England) Miss F B James	(England) Mrs Dorothy Crouch	9-3 9-7 9–0
(England) Mrs Elizabeth Bryans-Wolfe	(England) Miss N E Hill	w/o
(England) Miss M F Barber	(England) Miss Phyllis Tew	9-0 9-2 9–6
(England) Mrs Winifred Livingstone-Learmonth	(England) Mrs F M Gilroy	9-3 9-3 9–1
(England) Hon Mrs Diana Rhys +	(England) Miss M Holden	w/o
(England) Miss Kathleen Tew	(England) Mrs M Houlder	9-0 9-1 9–0
(England) Mrs Amy Cremer	(England) Miss S E Bailey	w/o
(England) Joyce Cave	(England) Miss R Mellor	9-1 9-0 9–3
(England) Miss A V Blake	(England) Miss H J Varden	9-7 9-2 9–2
(England) Miss E H Harvey	(England) Lady Katharine Cairns	9-5 9-10 9-6 2-9 9–5
(England) Mrs C Nation	(England) Miss Patricia Knox	w/o
(England) Margot Lumb	(England) Miss Joan Huntsman	9-6 9-5 9–4
(England) Mrs Elsie Pittman	(England) Miss V M Baker	9-0 9-6 9–1
(England) Lady Abedare ++	(England) Mrs D Page	w/o
(England) Mrs Judith Backhouse	(England) Mrs Ramsay	w/o
(England) Sylvia Huntsman	(England) Miss J Porter	9-2 9-3 9–0
(England) Miss Phyllis Blake	(England) Mrs H A Jones	9-1 9-0 9–3
(England) Mrs Gwendda du Boulay	(England) Mrs A Faithfull	9-1 9-2 9–2
(England) Mrs Margaret Dawnay	(England) Mrs G Liddle	9-0 9-0 9–6
(England) Miss Sheila Keith-Jones	(England) Miss Eileen Nicholson	9-4 9-0 9–1
(England) Mrs W S Gammell	(England) Mrs Angela Frisby	9-7 9-3 9–1
(England) Miss C Vickers	(England) Mrs E Willis	9-2 9-0 9–0
(England) Mrs Enid Sainsbury	(England) Mrs N M B James	w/o

=== Main draw ===
Third Round
(England) Noel	9	9	9
(England) Oakes	0	0	0
(England) Knox	2	10	7	9	9
(England) Winser	9	8	9	0	5
(England) Fordham	9	9	9
(England) Crane	1	7	2
(England) Luard	9	9	9
(England) Mogg	5	0	0
(England) Lytton-M	9	9	9
(England) James	2	2	0
(England) B-Wolfe	9	9	9
(England) Barber	0	0	7
(England) Livingstone-L	9	9	9
(England) Rhys	5	6	3
(England) Tew K	w/o
(England) Cremer
(England) Cave	9	9	9
(England) Blake A	3	6	0
(England) Harvey	9	9	9
(England) Nation	1	3	0
(England) Lumb	9	6	9	1	9
(England) Pittman	7	9	1	9	3
(England) Lady Aberdare	9	9	9
(England) Backhouse	6	3	2
(England) Huntsman S	9	5	9	7	9
(England) Blake P	3	9	7	9	1
(England) du Boulay	9	9	10
(England) Dawnay	5	1	9
(England) K-Jones	9	9	9
(England) Gammell	0	5	7
(England) Vickers	9	9	10
(England) Sainsbury	2	0	8

Fourth Round
(England) Noel	9	9	9
(England) Knox	0	0	1
(England) Fordham	3	9	9	9
(England) Luard	9	7	2	6
(England) Lytton-M	9	9	9
(England) B-Wolfe	5	6	3
(England) Livingstone-L	9	9	8	1	9
(England) Tew	5	1	10	9	6
(England) Cave	9	9	9
(England) Harvey	0	1	0
(England) Lumb	6	9	5	9	9
(England) Lady Aberdare	9	3	9	0	3
(England) Huntsman	9	10	6	9
(England) du Boulay	5	8	9	7
(England) K-Jones	9	9	9
(England) Vickers	2	4	0

Quarter Finals
(England) Noel	9	9	9
(England) Fordham	3	2	1
(England) Lytton-M	9	9	10
(England) Livingstone-L	0	3	9
(England) Cave	9	9	9
(England) Lumb	7	2	3
(England) Huntsman	6	10	9	9
(England) K-Jones	9	9	7	1

Semi-finals
(England) Noel	5	9	9	10
(England) Lytton-M	9	6	4	8
(England) Cave	9	10	9
(England) Huntsman	2	8	2

Final
(England) Noel	9	9	9
(England) Cave	5	7	1

=== Notes ===
+ Diana Rhys (née Diana Sloane-Stanley)
++ Lady Aberdare is Mrs Margaret Bruce

Preceded by 1931	British Open Squash Championships; England (London); 1932	Succeeded by 1933
