= 1927 Women's British Open Squash Championship =

British Open Squash Championships
- 6th Women's British Open Championships

Details
- Location: London, England
- Venue: Queen's Club, West Kensington

The 1927 Ladies Open Championships was held at the Queen's Club, West Kensington in London from 28 November - 4 December 1926.
Cecily Fenwick won her second successive title defeating Nancy Cave in a repeat of the 1926 final. This championship was held during 1926 but in the 1926/27 season so is attributed as being the 1927 event. Joyce Cave was still unable to compete due to a wrist injury.

== Draw and results ==
=== Section A (round robin) ===
Player One	Player Two	Score
(England) Miss Cecily Fenwick	(England) Miss Elizabeth Foster	9-0 9-0
(England) Miss Cecily Fenwick	(England) Miss Joan Huntsman	9-2 9-7
(England) Miss Cecily Fenwick	(England) Miss P Slagg	9-0 9-0
(England) Miss Elizabeth Foster	(England) Miss Joan Huntsman	9-6 9-2
(England) Miss Elizabeth Foster	(England) Miss P Slagg	9-7 8-10 9-5
(England) Miss Joan Huntsman	(England) Miss P Slagg	9-2 9-5

=== Section B (round robin) ===
Player One	Player Two	Score
(England) Miss Nancy Cave	(England) Mrs Hartley	9-4 9-0
(England) Miss Nancy Cave	(England) Mrs Urwick	9-0 9-0
(England) Miss Nancy Cave	(England) Miss Eileen Nicholson	9-2 9-3
(England) Miss Eileen Nicholson	(England) Mrs Urwick	9-3 9-0
(England) Miss Eileen Nicholson	(England) Mrs Hartley	9-6 9-5
(England) Mrs Hartley	(England) Mrs Urwick	9-3 10-8

=== Section C (round robin) ===
Player One	Player Two	Score
(England) Miss Sylvia Huntsman	(England) Miss Phyllis Blake	9-2 9-4
(England) Miss Sylvia Huntsman	(England) Miss Susan Noel	9-2 9-0
(England) Miss Sylvia Huntsman	(England) Mrs Potter	9-0 9-2
(England) Miss Phyllis Blake	(England) Miss Susan Noel	9-2 9-1
(England) Miss Phyllis Blake	(England) Mrs Potter	9-1 9-0
(England) Miss Susan Noel	(England) Mrs Potter	10-8 9-4

=== Section D (round robin) ===
Player One	Player Two	Score
(England) Hon Mrs Margaret Bruce	(England) Miss A Blake	9-2 9-1
(England) Hon Mrs Margaret Bruce	(England) Miss Joyce Nicholson	2-9 9-5 9-4
(England) Hon Mrs Margaret Bruce	(England) Mrs Naylor	9-0 9-4
(England) Hon Mrs Margaret Bruce	(England) Miss Carter	9-0 9-2
(England) Miss Joyce Nicholson	(England) Miss A Blake	9-1 4-9 9-1
(England) Miss Joyce Nicholson	(England) Miss Carter	9-0 9-0
(England) Miss Joyce Nicholson	(England) Mrs Naylor	9-6 9-4
(England) Miss A Blake	(England) Miss Carter	9-0 9-0
(England) Miss A Blake	(England) Mrs Naylor	9-0 2-9 9-5
(England) Mrs Naylor	(England) Miss Carter	9-0 9-3

=== Second round ===
Player One	Player Two	Score
(England) Mrs Margaret Bruce	(England) Miss Eileen Nicholson	9-2 9-0 9-5
(England) Miss Nancy Cave	(England) Miss Phyllis Blake	4-9 9-8 0-9 0-1 9-1
(England) Miss Sylvia Huntsman	(England) Miss Elizabeth Foster	9-3 9-4 9-0
(England) Miss Cecily Fenwick	(England) Miss Joyce Nicholson	9-7 9-2 9-3

=== Semi finals ===
Player One	Player Two	Score
(England) Miss Cecily Fenwick	(England) Miss Sylvia Huntsman	3 games to 1
(England) Miss Nancy Cave	(England) Mrs Margaret Bruce	3 games to 2

=== Final ===
Player One	Player Two	Score
(England) Miss Cecily Fenwick	(England) Miss Nancy Cave	4-9 9-6 9-2 9-5

Preceded by 1926	British Open Squash Championships; England (London); 1927	Succeeded by 1928
