= 1931 Women's British Open Squash Championship =

British Open Squash Championships
- 10th Women's British Open Championships

Details
- Location: London, England
- Venue: Queen's Club, West Kensington

The 1931 Ladies Open Championships was held at the Queen's Club, West Kensington in London from 19 to 23 January 1931.
Cecily Fenwick won her third title defeating Nancy Cave in the final. A record 44 entries were received for the 1931 Open Championship

== Draw and results ==
=== First round ===
Player one	Player two	Score
(England) Cecily Fenwick	(England) Miss V Wagg	w/o
(England) Miss Diana Sloane-Stanley	(England) Mrs Enid Sainsbury	w/o
(England) Mrs V S Daniell	(England) Mrs Marion Crispe	9-0 9-2 9-0
(England) Joyce Cave	(England) Mrs Harcourt	9-0 9-1 9-0
(Scotland) Miss S Knox	(England) Hon Mrs Kathleen Drax	9-5 9-1 9-6
(England) Miss A Dalrymple	(England) Mrs Edith Strawson	9-3 9-6 9-4
(England) Susan Noel	(England) Miss H Nitch	9-0 9-1 9-0
(England) Sylvia Huntsman	(England) Miss K M Crispe	9-2 9-4 9-0
(England) Miss J Parker	(England) Miss M Haywood	w/o
(England) Mrs Hilary Stebbing	(England) Mrs Muriel Cheney	9-0 9-2 6-9 9-3
(England) Miss Sheila Keith-Jones	(England) Mrs J Winser	9-0 9-2 9-6
(England) Miss M Rothschild	(England) Mrs Winifred Livingstone-Learmonth	9-0 9-6 9-2

=== Main draw ===
Second Round
(England) Cecily Fenwick	9	9	9
(England) Miss Diana Sloane-Stanley	1	1	1
(England) Miss A Blake	10	8	9	9
(England) Mrs H A Jones	9	10	2	2
(England) Joyce Cave	4	9	9	9
(England) Mrs V S Daniell	9	3	6	8
(England) Miss A Dalrymple	9	10	9
(Scotland) Miss S Knox	3	8	2
(England) Miss Anne Lytton-Milbanke	w/o
(England) Miss Dalgliesh
(England) Mrs Elsie Pittman	9	9	9
(England) Mrs Bradford	1	6	6
(England) Mrs Elizabeth Bryans-Wolfe	9	9	9
(England) Miss M O Cane	0	0	6
(England) Mrs Amy Cremer	9	9	9
(England) Miss M K Addis	7	6	5
(England) Nancy Cave	9	9	9
(England) Miss Toyne	3	1	6
(England) Miss N James	9	9	9
(England) Miss J Portu	5	4	2
(England) Miss Phyllis Blake	9	9	9
(England) Miss E C Mogg	0	3	1
(England) Miss M Fraser	9	9	9
(England) Miss Joan Huntsman	2	4	1
(England) Sylvia Huntsman	9	9	5	9
(England) Susan Noel	1	7	9	5
(England) Miss J Parker	9	9	9
(England) Mrs Hilary Stebbing	4	2	0
(England) Miss Shelia Keith-Jones	10	4	10	10
(England) Miss M Rothschild	8	9	9	9
(England) Miss E Fordham	4	9	9	8	9
(England) Miss C C Morse	9	2	7	10	5

Third Round
(England) Fenwick	9	9	9
(England) Blake A	0	3	5
(England) Cave J	8	9	9	9
(England) Dalrymple	10	1	1	7
(England) Lytton-M	9	9	9
(England) Pittman	1	1	0
(England) B-Wolfe	9	9	9
(England) Cremer	0	4	1
(England) Cave N	9	9	9
(England) James	3	7	1
(England) Blake P	1	9	10	4	10
(England) Fraser	9	3	8	9	8
(England) Huntsman S	9	9	9
(England) Parker	1	5	5
(England) Keith-Jones	9	9	9
(England) Fordham	5	3	7

Quarter Finals
(England) Fenwick	9	9	9
(England) Cave J	7	3	7
(England) Lytton-M	9	9	9
(England) B-Wolfe	1	0	0
(England) Cave N	9	9	9
(England) Blake P	2	3	1
(England) Huntsman	9	9	9
(England) Keith-Jones	7	6	2

Semi-finals
(England) Fenwick	9	9	10
(England) Lytton-M	6	0	8
Final
(England) Fenwick	9	10	9	9
(England) Cave N	7	8	10	1
(England) Cave N	9	9	9
(England) Huntsman	8	7	6

Preceded by 1930	British Open Squash Championships; England (London); 1931	Succeeded by 1932
