= 1926 Women's British Open Squash Championship =

British Open Squash Championships
- 5th Women's British Open Championships

Details
- Location: London, England
- Venue: Queen's Club, West Kensington

The 1926 Ladies Open Championships was held at the Queen's Club, West Kensington in London from 14 to 19 December 1925.
Cecily Fenwick won the title defeating Nancy Cave in the final. This championship was held in the 1925 but in the 1925/26 season so is attributed as being the 1926 event. Joyce Cave was unable to defend her title due to injury and the Times reported that due to her injury she was unable to train with her sister Nancy Cave which had a bearing on the result of the final.

== Draw and results ==
=== Section A (round robin) ===
Player One	Player Two	Score
(England) Miss Phyllis Blake	(England) Miss Nancy Cave	21–19
(England) Miss Phyllis Blake	(England) Miss P Slagg	21–1
(England) Miss Phyllis Blake	(England) Mrs Whetstone	21–3
(England) Miss Phyllis Blake	(England) Miss Montmorency	21–1
(England) Miss Nancy Cave	(England) Miss P Slagg	21–13
(England) Miss Nancy Cave	(England) Mrs Whetstone	21–2
(England) Miss Nancy Cave	(England) Miss Montmorency	21–0
(England) Miss P Slagg	(England) Mrs Whetstone	21–12
(England) Miss P Slagg	(England) Miss Montmorency	21–1
(England) Mrs Whetstone	(England) Miss Montmorency	21–1

=== Section B (round robin) ===
Player One	Player Two	Score
(England) Miss Sylvia Huntsman	(England) Miss Eileen Nicholson	21-10
(England) Miss Sylvia Huntsman	(England) Mrs Judith Backhouse	21-5
(England) Miss Sylvia Huntsman	(England) Mrs Hartley	21-2
(England) Miss Sylvia Huntsman	(England) Mrs Edith Strawson	21-4
(England) Miss Eileen Nicholson	(England) Mrs Judith Backhouse	21-12
(England) Miss Eileen Nicholson	(England) Mrs Hartley	21-9
(England) Miss Eileen Nicholson	(England) Mrs Edith Strawson	21-10
(England) Mrs Judith Backhouse	(England) Mrs Hartley	21-17
(England) Mrs Judith Backhouse	(England) Mrs Edith Strawson	21-9
(England) Mrs Hartley	(England) Mrs Edith Strawson	21-8

=== Section C (round robin) ===
Player One	Player Two	Score
(England) Hon Mrs Margaret Bruce	(England) Miss Joyce Nicholson	23-21
(England) Hon Mrs Margaret Bruce	(England) Hon Miss Judith Denman	21-16
(England) Hon Mrs Margaret Bruce	(England) Miss Susan Noel	21-6
(England) Hon Mrs Margaret Bruce	(England) Miss H Foster	21-1
(England) Hon Mrs Margaret Bruce	(England) Mrs H G Stoker	21-0
(England) Miss Joyce Nicholson	(England) Hon Miss Judith Denman	21-19
(England) Miss Joyce Nicholson	(England) Miss Susan Noel	21-1
(England) Miss Joyce Nicholson	(England) Miss H Foster	23-21
(England) Miss Joyce Nicholson	(England) Mrs H G Stoker	21-1
(England) Hon Miss Judith Denman	(England) Miss Susan Noel	21-3
(England) Hon Miss Judith Denman	(England) Miss H Foster	21-1
(England) Hon Miss Judith Denman	(England) Mrs H G Stoker	21-4
(England) Miss Susan Noel	(England) Miss H Foster	21-15
(England) Miss Susan Noel	(England) Mrs H G Stoker	21-4
(England) Miss H Foster	(England) Mrs H G Stoker	21-3

=== Section D (round robin) ===
Player One	Player Two	Score
(England) Miss Cecily Fenwick	(England) Miss A Blake	21-12
(England) Miss Cecily Fenwick	(England) Lady Olive Smith-Dorrien	21-6
(England) Miss Cecily Fenwick	(England) Miss Joan Huntsman	21-2
(England) Lady Olive Smith-Dorrien	(England) Miss A Blake	21-7
(England) Lady Olive Smith-Dorrien	(England) Miss Joan Huntsman	21-18
(England) Miss Joan Huntsman	(England) Miss A Blake	21-7

=== Second round ===
Player One	Player Two	Score
(England) Miss Joyce Nicholson	(England) Miss Phyllis Blake	8-15 15-7 15–8
(England) Miss Nancy Cave	(England) Lady Olive Smith-Dorrien	15-5 15–0
(England) Miss Sylvia Huntsman	(England) Hon Mrs Margaret Bruce	15-0 15–1
(England) Miss Cecily Fenwick	(England) Miss Eileen Nicholson	15-1 15–4

=== Semi-finals ===
Player One	Player Two	Score
(England) Miss Cecily Fenwick	(England) Miss Sylvia Huntsman	16-13 15–3
(England) Miss Nancy Cave	(England) Miss Joyce Nicholson	15-6 5-15 15–3

=== Final ===
Player One	Player Two	Score
(England) Miss Cecily Fenwick	(England) Miss Nancy Cave	15-12 15–11

Preceded by 1925	British Open Squash Championships; England (London); 1926	Succeeded by 1927
