= 1924 Women's British Open Squash Championship =

British Open Squash Championships
- 3rd Women's British Open Championships

Details
- Location: London, England
- Venue: Queen's Club, West Kensington

The 1924 Ladies Open Championships was held at the Queen's Club, West Kensington in London from 3–8 December 1923.
Nancy Cave won the title defeating her sister Joyce Cave in the final. This championship was held in the 1923 but in the 1923/24 season so is attributed as being the 1924 event.

== Draw and results ==
=== Section A (round robin) ===
Player One	Player Two	Score
(England) Miss Joyce Cave	(England) Mrs E Tew ++	21-12
(England) Miss Joyce Cave	(England) Miss Eileen Nicholson	21-3
(England) Miss Joyce Cave	(England) Mrs R G De Quetteville +	21-2
(England) Mrs E Tew ++	(England) Miss Eileen Nicholson	21-10
(England) Mrs E Tew ++	(England) Mrs R G De Quetteville +	21-3
(England) Miss Eileen Nicholson	(England) Mrs R G De Quetteville +	21-2

=== Section B (round robin) ===
Player One	Player Two	Score
(England) Miss Nancy Cave	(England) Miss Reid	21-0
(England) Miss Nancy Cave	(England) Miss Cecily Fenwick	21-9
(England) Miss Nancy Cave	(England) Miss Joyce Nicholson	21-9
(England) Miss Cecily Fenwick	(England) Miss Reid	21-0
(England) Miss Joyce Nicholson	(England) Miss Reid	21-4
(England) Miss Cecily Fenwick	(England) Miss Joyce Nicholson	21-16

=== Section C (round robin) ===
Player One	Player Two	Score
(England) Miss Sylvia Huntsman	(England) Miss Lees	21-5
(England) Miss Sylvia Huntsman	(England) Mrs Potter	21-3
(England) Miss Sylvia Huntsman	(England) Miss V Wagg	21-0
(England) Miss Lees	(England) Mrs Potter	21-4
(England) Miss Lees	(England) Miss V Wagg	21-14
(England) Miss V Wagg	(England) Mrs Potter	21-2

=== Section D (round robin) ===
Player One	Player Two	Score
(England) Miss Phyllis Blake	(England) Miss Joan Huntsman	21-10
(England) Miss Phyllis Blake	(England) Mrs Johnson	21-15
(England) Miss Phyllis Blake	(England) Miss P Slagg	21-10
(England) Miss Joan Huntsman	(England) Mrs Johnson	21-14
(England) Miss Joan Huntsman	(England) Miss P Slagg	21-15
(England) Mrs Johnson	(England) Miss P Slagg	w/o

=== Second round ===
Player One	Player Two	Score
(England) Miss Nancy Cave	(England) Miss Joan Huntsman	15-5 15-4
(England) Miss Joyce Cave	(England) Miss Lees	15-3 15-4
(England) Miss Sylvia Huntsman	(England) Miss Cecily Fenwick	15-11 15-11
(England) Miss Phyllis Blake	(England) Hon Mrs Edward Tew ++	15-61 15-12

=== Semi finals ===
Player One	Player Two	Score
(England) Miss Nancy Cave	(England) Miss Sylvia Huntsman	15-10 15-5
(England) Miss Joyce Cave	(England) Miss Phyllis Blake	15-1 15-7

=== Final ===
Player One	Player Two	Score
(England) Miss Nancy Cave	(England) Miss Joyce Cave	15-8 15-13

+ Mrs R G De Quetteville (née Molly Austin-Cartmell)
++ Honourable Mrs Edward Tew (née Catherine Hawke)

Preceded by 1923	British Open Squash Championships; England (London); 1924	Succeeded by 1925
