= 1930 Women's British Open Squash Championship =

British Open Squash Championships
- 9th Women's British Open Championships

Details
- Location: London, England
- Venue: Queen's Club, West Kensington

The 1930 Ladies Open Championships was held at the Queen's Club, West Kensington in London from 20–25 January 1930.
Nancy Cave won her third title defeating Cecily Fenwick in the final.

== Draw and results ==
=== Qualifying round ===
Player One	Player Two	Score
(England) Miss W Haywood	(England) Mrs C Nation	9-0 9-1 9-1
(England) Miss Sheila Keith-Jones	(England) Mrs Enid Sainsbury	9-0 9-0 9-1
(England) Miss E Fordham	(England) Miss N M Boucher	7-9 8-10 91- 9-3 9-2
(England) Mrs V S Daniell	(England) Miss A Blake	9-2 9-2 9-7

=== Main draw ===
First Round
(England) Miss Nancy Cave	9	10	9
(England) Miss T S Fox	0	0	1
(England) Miss Rothschild	9	9	9
(England) Mrs M Miles	0	0	4
(England) Miss C C Morse	9	10	9
(England) Miss E C Mogg	2	8	4
(England) Mrs Winifred Livingstone-Learmonth
(England) Miss Kensington
(England) Miss Sylvia Huntsman	9	9	9
(England) Miss D H Stanhope	0	0	0
(England) Hon Mrs Maxwell
(England) Miss Palliser
(England) Mrs V S Daniell	9	7	9	9
(England) Miss E Fordham	0	9	1	2
(England) Miss K M Crispe	9	9	9
(England) Miss Bhicco Batlivala	4	1	7
(England) Miss Cecily Fenwick	w/o
(England) Mrs E G Earle
(England) Mrs J Naylor	5	9	9	9
(England) Mrs Marion Crispe	9	4	5	1
(England) Miss Elizabeth Foster	9	9	9
(England) Miss A Dalrymple	7	5	4
(England) Miss D E Boucher	w/o
(England) Lady Barbara Page Wood
(England) Hon Miss Anne Lytton-Milbanke	9	9	9
(England) Mrs Muriel Cheney	1	0	0
(England) Miss Joan Huntsman	9	9	9
(England) Mrs Hilary Stebbing	1	3	1
(England) Miss Shelia Keith-Jones	9	9	6	9
(England) Miss W Haywood	2	6	9	4
(England) Mrs Judith Backhouse
(England) Miss Comeragh

Second Round
(England) Cave N	9	9	9
(England) Rothschild	4	1	5
(England) Morse	w/o
(England) Livingstone-Learmouth
(England) Huntsman S	9	9	9
(England) Maxwell	0	5	0
(England) Daniell	9	9	9
(England) Crispe	2	0	0
(England) Fenwick	w/o
(England) Naylor
(England) Foster	9	10	9
(England) Boucher	2	8	1
(England) Lytton-M	9	9	9
(England) Huntsman J	0	2	0
(England) Keith-Jones	9	9	4	1	9
(England) Backhouse	4	6	9	9	3

Quarter Finals
(England) Cave N	9	9	9
(England) Morse	0	3	0
(England) Huntsman S	5	9	9	7	9
(England) Daniell	9	5	4	9	8
(England) Fenwick	9	9	9
(England) Foster	2	2	2
(England) Lytton-M	9	9	9
(England) Keith-Jones	1	6	5

Semi-finals
(England) Cave N	9	9	7	9
(England) Huntsman S	2	2	9	3
Final
(England) Cave N	10	9	7	9
(England) Fenwick	8	1	9	5
(England) Fenwick	9	9	6	5	9
(England) Lytton-M	3	6	9	9	2

=== Notes ===
Miss Joyce Cave was injured and could not compete.

Preceded by 1929	British Open Squash Championships; England (London); 1930	Succeeded by 1931
