= 1933 Women's British Open Squash Championship =

British Open Squash Championships
- 12th Women's British Open Championships

Details
- Location: London, England
- Venue: Queen's Club, West Kensington

The 1933 Ladies Open Championships was held at the Queen's Club, West Kensington in London from 27 March - 1 April 1933.
Susan Noel won her second consecutive title defeating Sheila Keith-Jones in the final. The Championship was held later than usual because the leading players were involved in a tournament in the United States.

== Draw and results ==
=== First round ===
| Player One | Player Two | Score |
|---|---|---|
| (England) Miss Susan Noel | (England) Miss M Maclagan | 9-1 9-0 9-0 |
| (England) Miss Margot Lumb | (England) Miss Kathleen Tew | 9-7 9-5 9-5 |
| (England) Miss Sheila Keith-Jones | (England) Mrs Judith Backhouse | 9-4 9-4 9-5 |
| (England) Miss Phyllis Blake | (England) Miss J Ingram | w/o |
| (England) Mrs W S Daniell | (England) Mrs Winifred Livingstone-Learmonth | 9-6 9-2 9-1 |
| (England) Miss Joyce Cave | (England) Miss E H Harvey | 9-1 9-7 9-6 |
| (England) Miss Anne Lytton-Milbanke | (England) Miss Phyllis Tew | 9-3 9-0 9-0 |
| (England) Miss Sylvia Huntsman | (England) Miss Ruth Luard | 10-8 10-9 7-9 10-8 |
| (England) Lady Aberdare + | (England) Mrs Edith Strawson | 6-9 9-1 9-4 9-6 |
| (England) Miss M Fraser | (England) Mrs D Page | 10-8 3-9 9-1 9-5 |
| (England) Mrs Elsie Pittman | (England) Miss E C M Toyne | 10-8 9-4 9-1 |
| (England) Mrs J Winser | (England) Miss Alexandra McOstrich | 9-4 9-3 8-10 9-7 |
| (England) Miss J L Seymour | (England) Miss Elizabeth Knox | w/o |
| (England) Mrs Madeline Chichester | (England) Mrs Elizabeth Bryans-Wolfe | w/o |
| (England) Lady Katharine Cairns | (England) Miss J Cunningham | w/o |
| (England) Miss Betty Cooke | (England) Miss E Fordham | 9-4 9-5 9-3 |

=== Second round ===
| Player One | Player Two | Score |
|---|---|---|
| (England) Noel | (England) Abedare | 9-2 9-0 9-0 |
| (England) Lumb | (England) Fraser | 9-2 9-2 9-1 |
| (England) Keith-Jones | (England) Pittman | 7-9 9-5 9-1 9-6 |
| (England) Blake P | (England) Winser | 6-9 9-7 8-10 9-6 9-3 |
| (England) Daniell | (England) Seymour | 9-5 9-3 4-9 9-1 |
| (England) Cave J | (England) Chichester | 9-2 9-0 9-4 |
| (England) Lytton-M | (England) Cairns | 9-5 9-2 9-0 |
| (England) Huntsman S | (England) Cooke | 1-9 9-1 9-5 4-9 9-6 |

=== Quarter finals ===
| Player One | Player Two | Score |
|---|---|---|
| (England) Noel | (England) Daniell | 9-1 10-8 10-8 |
| (England) Lumb | (England) Cave | 9-5 9-4 9-0 |
| (England) Keith-Jones | (England) Lytton-M | 10-8 4-9 9-5 9-4 |
| (England) Blake | (England) Huntsman | 4-9 8-10 9-7 9-3 9-2 |

=== Semi finals ===
| Player One | Player Two | Score |
|---|---|---|
| (England) Noel | (England) Lumb | 9-5 9-1 9-5 |
| (England) Keith-Jones | (England) Blake | 9-5 9-0 9-5 |

=== Final ===
| Player One | Player Two | Score |
|---|---|---|
| (England) Noel | (England) Keith-Jones | 9-4 9-0 9-2 |

=== Notes ===
+ Lady Aberdare also known as Mrs Margaret Bruce

| Preceded by 1932 | British Open Squash Championships; England (London); 1933 | Succeeded by 1934 |
