= 1923 Women's British Open Squash Championship =

British Open Squash Championships
- 2nd British Open Championships

Details
- Location: London, England
- Venue: Queen's Club, West Kensington

The 1923 Ladies Open Championships was held at the Queen's Club, West Kensington in London from 7–12 November 1922.

Sylvia Huntsman won the title defeating Nancy Cave in the final. This was the second championship held during 1922 so is attributed as being the 1923 event.

== Draw and results ==
=== Section A (round robin) ===
Player One	Player Two	Score
(England) Miss Sylvia Huntsman	(England) Miss Joyce Nicholson	18-13 15-4
(England) Miss Sylvia Huntsman	(England) Mrs Toye	15-4 15-0
(England) Miss Sylvia Huntsman	(England) Hon Miss Beatrice Hope Prothero	15-2 15-0
(England) Miss Sylvia Huntsman	(England) Miss Joan Huntsman	15-0 15-6
(England) Miss Sylvia Huntsman	(England) Miss Joyce Cave	15-7 15-8
(England) Miss Sylvia Huntsman	(England) Mrs Bruce +	15-1 15-2
(England) Miss Joyce Cave	(England) Miss Joan Huntsman	15-5 15-14
(England) Miss Joyce Cave	(England) Mrs Toye	15-9 15-4
(England) Miss Joyce Cave	(England) Miss Joyce Nicholson	15-0 15-7
(England) Miss Joyce Cave	(England) Hon Miss Beatrice Hope Prothero	15-7 15-10
(England) Miss Joyce Cave	(England) Mrs Bruce +	15-9 7-15 15-7
(England) Mrs Bruce +	(England) Hon Miss Beatrice Hope Prothero	15-1 15-2
(England) Mrs Bruce +	(England) Miss Joyce Nicholson	15-1 12-15 15-7
(England) Mrs Bruce +	(England) Mrs Toye	15-1 15-0
(England) Mrs Bruce +	(England) Miss Joan Huntsman	9-15 15-4 15-7
(England) Miss Joan Huntsman	(England) Hon Miss Beatrice Hope Prothero	15-6 16-14
(England) Miss Joan Huntsman	(England) Mrs Toye	15-3 15-1
(England) Miss Joan Huntsman	(England) Miss Joyce Nicholson	8-15 15-8 15-4
(England) Hon Miss Beatrice Hope Prothero	(England) Miss J Nicholson	15-8 11-15 18-15
(England) Hon Miss Beatrice Hope Prothero	(England) Mrs Toye	15-2 15-5
(England) Miss J Nicholson	(England) Mrs Toye	15-4 17-14

=== Section B (round robin) ===
Player One	Player Two	Score
(England) Miss Nancy Cave	(England) Miss Eileen Nicholson	15-1 15-0
(England) Miss Nancy Cave	(England) Miss Rotherham	15-3 15-4
(England) Miss Nancy Cave	(England) Miss Rudd	15-2 15-2
(England) Miss Nancy Cave	(England) Mrs Carthew	15-3 15-3
(England) Miss Nancy Cave	(England) Miss B Hussey	15-7 15-4
(England) Miss Nancy Cave	(England) Miss Partlington	15-3 15-2
(England) Miss B Hussey	(England) Miss Eileen Nicholson	15-9 15-6
(England) Miss B Hussey	(England) Miss Partlington	15-0 15-3
(England) Miss B Hussey	(England) Miss Rotherham	15-7 15-8
(England) Miss B Hussey	(England) Mrs E Tew ++	15-12 9-15 15-10
(England) Miss B Hussey	(England) Miss Rudd	15-11 10-15 15-10
(England) Mrs E Tew ++	(England) Miss Rotherham	7-15 18-17 15-4
(England) Mrs E Tew ++	(England) Miss Rudd	15-7 15-7
(England) Mrs E Tew ++	(England) Miss Eileen Nicholson	15-1 15-8
(England) Mrs E Tew ++	(England) Mrs Carthew	15-3 15-0
(England) Miss Rotherham	(England) Miss Partlington	13-15 15-1 15-6
(England) Miss Rotherham	(England) Miss Eileen Nicholson	15-12 15-6
(England) Miss Rotherham	(England) Miss Rudd	15-5 0-15 15-5
(England) Miss Rudd	(England) Miss Eileen Nicholson	15-8 15-8
(England) Miss Rudd	(England) Mrs Carthew	15-10 15-10

+ Honourable Mrs Clarence Bruce (née Margaret Bethune Black)
++ Honourable Mrs Edward Tew (née Catherine Hawke)

=== Final ===
Player One	Player Two	Score
(England) Miss Sylvia Huntsman	(England) Miss Nancy Cave	6-15 15-9 17-15

Preceded by 1922	British Open Squash Championships; England (London); 1923	Succeeded by 1924
