= 1922 Women's British Open Squash Championship =

British Open Squash Championships
- 1st Women's British Open Championships

Details
- Location: London, England
- Venue: Queen's Club, West Kensington

The 1922 Ladies Open Championships was held at the Queen's Club, West Kensington in London from 7 February to 9 February 1922.
Joyce Cave won the title defeating her older sister Nancy Cave in the final.

== Draw and results ==
=== Section A (round robin) ===
Player One	Player Two	Score
(England) Miss Margorie Cave	(England) Miss Joyce Cave	18-15
(England) Miss Margorie Cave	(England) Miss Partlington	15-2
(England) Miss Margorie Cave	(England) Mrs Carthew	15-1
(England) Miss Margorie Cave	(England) Miss Hope Prothero	15-5
(England) Miss Joyce Cave	(England) Miss Partlington	15-0
(England) Miss Joyce Cave	(England) Mrs Carthew	15-3
(England) Miss Joyce Cave	(England) Miss Hope Prothero	17-14
(England) Miss Partlington	(England) Miss Carthew	11-15
(England) Miss Partlington	(England) Miss Hope Prothero	4-15
(England) Mrs Carthew	(England) Miss Hope Prothero	4-15

=== Section B (round robin) ===
Player One	Player Two	Score
(England) Miss Nancy Cave	(England) Mrs J Boldero	15-0
(England) Miss Nancy Cave	(England) Mrs Bruce +	15-6
(England) Miss Nancy Cave	(England) Miss Eileen Nicholson	15-3
(England) Miss Nancy Cave	(England) Miss Joyce Nicholson	15-2
(England) Mrs Bruce +	(England) Mrs J Boldero	15-10
(England) Mrs Bruce +	(England) Miss Eileen Nicholson	15-10
(England) Mrs Bruce +	(England) Miss Joyce Nicholson	15-0
(England) Miss Joyce Nicholson	(England) Miss Eileen Nicholson	15-9
(England) Miss Joyce Nicholson	(England) Mrs J Boldero	15-11
(England) Miss Eileen Nicholson	(England) Mrs J Boldero	15-5

=== Semi finals ===
Player One	Player Two	Score
(England) Miss Joyce Cave	(England) Margorie Cave	11-15 17-16 15-12
(England) Miss Nancy Cave	(England) Mrs Bruce +	15-2 16-13

=== Final ===
Player One	Player Two	Score
(England) Miss Joyce Cave	(England) Miss Nancy Cave	11-15 15-10 15-9

+ Honourable Mrs Clarence Bruce (née Margaret Bethune Black)

Preceded by None	British Open Squash Championships; England (London); 1922	Succeeded by 1923
