= 1935 Women's British Open Squash Championship =

British Open Squash Championships
- 14th Women's British Open Championships

Details
- Location: London, England
- Venue: Queen's Club, West Kensington

The 1935 Ladies Open Championships was held at the Queen's Club, West Kensington in London from 3–8 December 1934.
Margot Lumb won her first title defeating the Honourable Miss Anne Lytton-Milbanke in the final. Three times champion Miss Susan Noel decided not to defend her title. Seeds were inaugurated and the slower ball used in men's competitions was also introduced. The event took place in December 1934 which formed part of the 1934-1935 season.

== Draw and results ==
=== First round ===
Player one	Player two	Score
(England) Margot Lumb +	(England) Miss C Vickers	9-0 9-0 9-2
(England) Hon Miss Anne Lytton-Milbanke +	(England) Mrs C Pinckney	9-0 9-3 9-1
(England) Mrs Elsie Pittman +	(England) Miss G Lawrence	9-1 9-1 9-1
(England) Mrs Sheila McKechnie +	(England) Miss Betty Cooke	9-0 10-9 9-2
(England) Miss Kathleen Tew	(England) Miss S Keane	w/o
(England) Miss R Sykes	(England) Miss Joan Huntsman	9-4 9-4 9-7
(England) Miss N L Kelman	(England) Miss E Windsor-Aubrey	9-7 9-4 9-2
(England) Mrs Edith Strawson	(England) Miss Alexandra McOstrich	7-9 9-5 9-10 9-2 9-4
(England) Mrs Judith Backhouse	(England) Miss J Pearson	9-6 9-2 9-4
(England) Sylvia Huntsman	(England) Miss G Babington-Smith	9-7 9-0 9-5
(England) Miss Mary McLintock	(England) Mrs Waymouth	9-0 9-6 9-0
(England) Miss J E Cunningham	(England) Miss E Fordham	0-9 4-9 9-3 9-1 9-4
(England) Miss M Fraser	(England) Mrs M Gill	9-2 7-9 9-3 9-5
(England) Miss E M Bain	(England) Miss T Rowland	9-1 9-2 9-0
(England) Miss J Porter	(England) Miss I W Leach	9-0 9-2 9-0
(England) Mrs E C M Sewell	(England) Miss K M Roberts	9-7 9-0 9-1
(England) Miss M E L Haynes	(England) Mrs Dorothy Crouch	9-6 9-6 9-3
(England) Miss Marjorie Raphael	(England) Miss K Steele	0-9 9-6 9-2 10-8
(England) Miss Phyllis Tew	(England) Mrs Madeline Chichester	9-6 9-2 9-0
(England) Mrs Angela Frisby	(England) Miss D Winterbotham	9-0 9-3 9-3
(England) Miss P Phelps	(England) Mrs H M Jones	9-6 9-7 9-0
(England) Miss Diana Lamplough	(England) Miss M E Hayes	9-6 9-5 9-6
(England) Mrs V S Daniell	(England) Miss A Connell	9-4 9-0 9-2
(England) Mrs Barbara Shakerley	(England) Mrs E Jordan	w/o
(England) Mrs Phyllis Philcox	(England) Miss Margery Alabaster	9-0 9-0 9-5
(England) Miss Josephine Ley	(England) Mrs S Fisk	9-5 10-8 9-6
(England) Miss W E Murphy	(England) Mrs D R Hicks	7-9 9-4 9-5 9-4
(England) Mrs G Craig Lucy	(England) Miss W M H Wild	9-3 9-3 9-3
(England) Mrs Violet St Clair Morford	(England) Miss J Mardon	9-1 9-0 9-4
(England) Mrs Margaret Dawnay	(England) Mrs D Page	10-8 9-6 9-1
(England) Miss C Mellor	(England) Miss Elizabeth Manson Bahr	10-8 7-9 9-7 3-9 9-5
(England) Miss M G Roberston	(England) Miss E Dewhurst	9-0 9-1 10-8

+ denotes seed

=== Second round ===
Player one	Player two	Score
(England) Lumb	(England) Haynes	9-0 9-0 9-1
(England) Lytton-M	(England) Raphael	9-4 9-4 9-1
(England) Pittman	(England) Tew	9-5 9-3 9-2
(England) McKechnie	(England) Frisby	9-2 9-0 9-0
(England) Tew	(England) Phelps	9-5 9-2 9-0
(England) Sykes	(England) Lamplough	9-6 9-2 9-3
(England) Kelman	(England) Daniell	9-4 9-5 9-3
(England) Strawson	(England) Shakerley	9-7 9-3 9-5
(England) Backhouse	(England) Philcox	9-3 9-0 9-3
(England) Huntsman	(England) Ley	10-8 9-0 9-0
(England) McLintock	(England) Murphy	9-5 9-2 9-0
(England) Cunningham	(England) Lucy	9-2 9-1 9-1
(England) Fraser	(England) St Clair Morford	9-3 9-3 9-6
(England) Bain	(England) Dawnay	9-5 9-6 9-3
(England) Porter	(England) Mellor	9-2 9-2 9-6
(England) Sewell	(England) Roberston	9-3 9-7 9-2

=== Third round ===
Player one	Player two	Score
(England) Lumb	(England) Fraser	9-2 9-2 9-6
(England) Lytton-M	(England) Backhouse	9-0 9-2 9-3
(England) Pittman	(England) McLintock	9-7 5-9 3-9 9-6 9-3
(England) McKechnie	(England) Bain	9-3 9-0 9-0
(England) Tew	(England) Cunningham	5-9 9-3 9-6 5-9 9-7
(England) Sykes	(England) Huntsman	2-9 1-9 9-3 9-6 9-0
(England) Kelman	(England) Sewell	8-10 9-6 10-8 9-7
(England) Strawson	(England) Porter	9-7 9-4 9-1

=== Quarter-finals ===
Player one	Player two	Score
(England) Lumb	(England) Tew	9-1 9-4 9-0
(England) Lytton-M	(England) Sykes	9-2 9-1 9-4
(England) Pittman	(England) Kelman	2-9 9-3 9-3 7-9 9-4
(England) McKechnie	(England) Strawson	9-4 9-1 9-4

=== Semi-finals ===
Player one	Player two	Score
(England) Lytton-M	(England) McKechnie	9-4 5-9 10-8 9-5
(England) Lumb	(England) Pittman	9-2 9-0 9-2

=== Final ===
Player one	Player two	Score
(England) Lumb	(England) Lytton-Millbanke	9-4 9-0 9-1

Preceded by 1934	British Open Squash Championships; England (London); 1935	Succeeded by 1936
