= 1934 Women's British Open Squash Championship =

British Open Squash Championships
- 13th Women's British Open Championships

Details
- Location: London, England
- Venue: Queen's Club, West Kensington

The 1934 Ladies Open Championships was held at the Queen's Club, West Kensington in London from 5–11 February 1934.
Susan Noel won her third consecutive title defeating Margot Lumb in the final. The Championship attracted the top players from the United States for the first time.

== Draw and results ==
=== First round ===
Player one	Player two	Score
(England) Susan Noel	(England) Mrs Violet St Clair Morford	9-2 9-4 9-0
(England) Margot Lumb	(England) Miss N Kelman	9-2 9-0 9-0
(England) Mrs Sheila McKechnie	(England) Miss Elizabeth Knox	9-1 9-1 9-1
(England) Hon Miss Anne Lytton-Milbanke	(England) Miss W E Murphy	9-1 9-1 9-0
(England) Miss Alexandra McOstrich	(England) Mrs D Page	9-6 9-7 5-9 6-9 9-1
(United States) Miss Anne Page	(England) Miss E Fordham	9-1 9-6 9-1
(United States) Miss Agnes Lamme	(England) Miss M Maclagan	9-4 9-0 9-0
(United States) Mrs Margaret Howe	(England) Lady Katharine Cairns	9-6 9-7 9-2
(England) Mrs J Winser	(England) Miss N Boucher	9-2 9-5 9-0
(England) Mrs Janet Barrett	(United States) Mrs Adelaide Stuart-Green	9-2 9-4 10-8
(England) Miss C Vickers	(England) Miss Peggy Runge	9-1 9-2 9-1
(England) Mrs Judith Backhouse	(England) Mrs Madeline Chichester	9-3 9-3 10-8
(England) Miss J L Seymour	(England) Miss J Cunningham	9-2 9-5 9-7
(England) Lady Aberdare +	(England) Mrs Nowell Clark	9-0 9-3 9-2
(England) Miss N E Hill	(England) Miss A Brown	w/o
(England) Miss Betty Cooke	(England) Miss E H Harvey	9-4 9-5 9-7
(United States) Miss Cecile Bowes	(England) Miss Elizabeth Manson Bahr	9-1 9-3 9-10 9-4
(England) Miss E C M Toyne	(United States) Miss Marguerite Anderson	9-2 5-9 9-3 9-4
(England) Mrs Elsie Pittman	(England) Miss O L Webb	9-2 9-4 9-6
(England) Sylvia Huntsman	(England) Miss N M Lyle	w/o
(England) Miss K M Roberts	(England) Miss E H Pemberton	9-3 9-7 9-0
(England) Miss Phyllis Tew	(England) Miss M E Hayes	5-9 9-4 9-6 9-2
(England) Mrs Edith Strawson	(England) Miss J Porter	9-4 9-7 9-1
(England) Miss Wendy St John Maule	(England) Miss Diana Lamplough	9-0 9-3 9-5
(England) Mrs D R Hicks	(England) Miss Joan Huntsman	10-9 9-1 9-5
(England) Mrs Elizabeth Bryans-Wolfe	(United States) Eleonora Sears	9-1 5-9 9-4 9-4
(England) Mrs Barbara Shakerley	(England) Miss Phyllis Blake	9-5 5-9 10-8 8-10 10-8
(England) Mrs E M Bain	(England) Mrs Curlewis	9-5 4-9 9-7 9-3
(England) Mrs M Gill	(England) Miss A Connell	9-7 5-9 9-5 9-2
(England) Miss Josephine Ley	(England) Mrs L E Houlder	9-2 9-3 9-7
(England) Mrs Margaret Dawnay	(England) Miss R Sykes	10-8 9-6 9-6

=== Second round ===
Player one	Player two	Score
(England) Noel	(United States) Bowes	9-0 9-1 9-6
(England) Lumb	(England) Toyne	9-0 9-2 9-0
(England) McKechnie	(England) Pittman	7-9 9-0 6-9 9-1 9-3
(England) Lytton-M	(England) Huntsman	9-4 9-1 9-1
(England) McOstrich	(England) Roberts	9-6 9-2 9-0
(United States) Page	(England) Freeman	9-2 9-4 9-6
(United States) Lamme	(England) Tew	9-3 5-9 9-19- 6
(United States) Howe	(England) Strawson	9-7 5-9 9-7 9-3
(England) Winser	(England) St John Maule	10-8 9-1 9-3
(England) Barrett	(England) Hicks	9-2 9-5 10-8
(England) Vickers	(England) Bryans-Wolfe	2-9 9-3 9-5 10-8
(England) Backhouse	(England) Shakerley	9-10 9-5 9-7 9-4
(England) Seymour	(England) Bain	9-4 9-7 9-2
(England) Lady Aberdare +	(England) Gill	9-0 3-9 9-3 9-1
(England) Hill	(England) Ley	5-9 8-10 9-4 9-5 9-5
(England) Cooke	(England) Dawnay	9-6 3-9 9-6 1-9 9-2

=== Third round ===
Player one	Player two	Score
(England) Noel	(England) Winser	9-0 9-0 9-1
(England) Lumb	(England) Hill	9-0 9-1 9-0
(England) McKechnie	(England) Barrett	9-2 9-10 9-4 9-0
(England) Lytton-M	(England) Seymour	9-0 9-1 9-5
(England) McOstrich	(England) Vickers	10-9 9-4 9-5
(United States) Howe	(England) Cooke	8-10 10-8 7-9 9-1 9-2
(United States) Page	(England) Backhouse	9-5 9-6 9-1
(United States) Lamme	(England) Lady Aberdare	9-4 9-4 9-6

=== Quarter-finals ===
Player one	Player two	Score
(England) Noel	(England) McOstrich	9-4 9-0 9-1
(England) Lumb	(United States) Howe	9-3 9-0 9-7
(England) McKechnie	(United States) Page	9-3 9-4 5-9 3-9 9-3
(England) Lytton-M	(United States) Lamme	9-2 7-9 10-8 9-1

=== Semi-finals ===
Player one	Player two	Score
(England) Noel	(England) McKechnie	9-2 9-7 5-9 9-?
(England) Lumb	(England) Lytton-Millbanke	9-2 9-2 9-1

=== Final ===
Player one	Player two	Score
(England) Noel	(England) Lumb	9-7 9-9 9-6

+ Lady Aberdare also known Mrs Margaret Bruce.

Preceded by 1933	British Open Squash Championships; England (London); 1934	Succeeded by 1935
