= 1937 Women's British Open Squash Championship =

British Open Squash Championships
- 16th Women's British Open Championships

Details
- Location: London, England
- Venue: Queen's Club, West Kensington

The 1937 Ladies Open Championships was held at the Queen's Club, West Kensington in London from 25–31 January 1937.
Margot Lumb won her third consecutive title defeating Mrs Sheila McKechnie in the final.

== Seeds ==
1. (England) Margot Lumb
2. (England) Hon Miss Anne Lytton-Milbanke
3. (England) Sheila McKechnie
4. (England) Elizabeth Knox

== Draw and results ==
=== First round ===
Player one	Player two	Score
(England) Margot Lumb		bye
(England) Hon Miss Anne Lytton-Milbanke		bye
(England) Miss T King		bye
(England) Miss E Brett		bye
(England) Miss Valerie Dalton-White		bye
(England) Miss M Riddell		bye
(England) Miss H Melsome		bye
(England) Mrs G A Murray		bye
(England) Mrs Sheila McKechnie	(England) Mrs W D Porter	9-5 9-0 9-7
(England) Miss Elizabeth Knox	(England) Mrs Judith Backhouse	8-10 9-1 9-2 9-5
(England) Mrs Margaret Dawnay	(England) Miss Marjorie Raphael	w/o
(England) Mrs M G Robertson	(England) Miss Ruth Luard	9-1 9-1 9-4
(England) Miss E Windsor-Aubrey	(England) Mrs H J Stribling	9-2 9-4 10-9
(England) Miss U Harris	(England) Miss Daphne Colegrave	9-3 9-0 9-7
(England) Miss Elizabeth Glascock	(England) Miss S M Holroyd	9-6 5-9 9-6 9-0
(England) Miss D C Wilcox	(England) Miss Elizabeth Manson Bahr	9-2 9-3 9-4
(England) Miss N L Kelman	(England) Mrs A Knight	9-7 3-9 10-8 9-4
(England) Miss M Fraser	(England) Mrs Diana Petitpierre	9-2 9-3 9-1
(England) Miss G Edwards	(England) Miss P Brown	w/o
(England) Miss M Grant	(England) Miss Peggy Runge	9-6 9-3 9-0
(England) Mrs Stella Blaxland-Levick	(England) Miss Ursula Foljambe	9-2 9-4 9-0
(England) Mrs P L Hervey	(England) Miss N Steven	9-0 9-2 9-5
(England) Miss A Connell	(England) Miss D F Cearns	10-8 9-6 9-3
(England) Mrs A Vickers	(England) Miss Mary McLintock	w/o
(England) Miss H M H Smeeton	(England) Mrs S M Green	w/o
(England) Mrs Phyllis Philcox	(England) Miss R Vickers	9-5 9-5 9-4
(England) Miss Joan Marquis	(England) Miss C Babington-Smith	9-6 9-6 9-4
(England) Mrs F C Thompson	(England) Mrs S B Pakenham	9-1 9-6 1-9 9-4
(England) Miss Berenice Lumb	(England) Miss E Caldwell	9-7 9-5 9-6
(England) Mrs Violet St Clair Morford	(England) Mrs D E Patten	9-1 9-3 9-4
(England) Miss C Vickers	(England) Miss Joan Huntsman	9-2 9-2 9-2
(England) Miss Olga Klingenberg	(England) Miss K B Jackson	9-2 9-0 9-7

=== Second round ===
Player one	Player two	Score
(England) Lumb M	(England) Brett	9-1 9-0 9-1
(England) Lytton-M	(England) Dalton-W	9-2 9-5 9-0
(England) McKechnie	(England) Blaxland-L	9-5 9-4 9-1
(England) Knox	(England) Hervey	6-9 9-0 9-2 9-4
(England) Dawnay	(England) Connell	9-1 9-3 9-4
(England) Robertson	(England) Vickers	9-4 9-0 9-2
(England) Windsor-Aubrey	(England) Smeeton	9-3 9-0 9-6
(England) Harris	(England) Philcox	2-9 5-9 9-2 9-6 9-0
(England) King	(England) Murray	9-10 3-3 ret
(England) Glascock	(England) Marquis	9-1 10-9 9-4
(England) Wilcox	(England) Thompson	5-9 9-7 9-2 99-3
(England) Kelman	(England) Lumb B	9-2 10-8 9-6
(England) Fraser	(England) Morford	9-2 9-6 0-9 7-9 9-0
(England) Riddell	(England) Melsome	9-1 9-1 9-1
(England) Edwards	(England) Vickers	9-2 9-2 9-3
(England) Grant	(England) Klingenberg	9-2 3-9 9-5 9-4

=== Third round ===
Player one	Player two	Score
(England) Lumb	(England) King	9-1 9-0 9-5
(England) McKechnie	(England) Glascock	9-0 9-1 9-0
(England) Robertson	(England) Wilcox	9-0 9-4 9-4
(England) Windsor-A	(England) Kelman	9-6 9-4 9-7
(England) Knox	(England) Fraser	9-5 9-5 0-9 9-1
(England) Lytton-M	(England) Riddell	9-1 9-2 9-2
(England) Dawnay	(England) Edwards	4-9 9-7 9-3 9-2
(England) Harris	(England) Grant	7-9 9-1 9-3 1-9 9-0

=== Quarter-finals ===
Player one	Player two	Score
(England) Lumb	(England) Dawnay	9-3 9-1 9-4
(England) McKechnie	(England) Robertson	9-4 9-4 9-5
(England) Lytton-M	(England) Windsor-Aubrey	9-1 9-0 9-7
(England) Knox	(England) Harris	9-3 9-3 9-0

=== Semi-finals ===
Player one	Player two	Score
(England) Lumb	(England) Knox	9-0 9-0 9-2
(England) McKechnie	(England) Lytton-M	9-2 9-3 1-9 9-5

=== Final ===
Player one	Player two	Score
(England) Lumb	(England) McKechnie	9-3 9-2 9-0

Preceded by 1936	British Open Squash Championships; England (London); 1937	Succeeded by 1938
