= 1936 Women's British Open Squash Championship =

British Open Squash Championships
- 15th Women's British Open Championships

Details
- Location: London, England
- Venue: Queen's Club, West Kensington

The 1936 Ladies Open Championships was held at the Queen's Club, West Kensington in London from 2–7 March 1936.
Margot Lumb won her second consecutive title defeating the Honourable Miss Anne Lytton-Milbanke in a repeat of the 1935 final. Eighty-six competitors entered resulting in the need for the Women's SRA to select fifty-six with the remaining twenty-nine taking part in eliminating events to find the final eight.

== Draw and results ==
=== First round ===
Player one	Player two	Score
(England) Margot Lumb	(England) Mrs Colville	9-0 9-0 9-1
(England) Miss E Green	(England) Miss Carroll de Courcy-Hamilton	10-9 9-6 9-5
(England) Lady Katharine Cairns	(United States) Miss Edith Drury	9-1 9-0 9-0
(United States) Miss Agnes Lamme	(England) Miss Phyllis Tew	10-8 9-7 9-1
(England) Miss Betty Cooke	(England) Miss Valerie Dalton-White	9-3 9-7 9-1
(England) Miss Elizabeth Knox	(United States) Eleonora Sears	10-9 9-3 9-4
(England) Miss Josephine Ley	(England) Miss Marianne Toyne	w/o
(United States) Miss Cecile Bowes	(England) Miss D C Wilcock	9-4 9-0 9-4
(England) Mrs Sheila McKechnie	(England) Miss A Alexander	9-6 9-6 9-2
(England) Mrs Margaret Dawnay	(England) Miss T King	8-10 9-4 4-9 9-3 9-3
(England) Miss Phyllis Blake	(United States) Mrs Rogers-Dunn	9-6 10-9 9-1
(England) Hon Miss Anne Lytton-Milbanke	(England) Mrs A E Spreckley	w/o
(England) Miss N L Kelman	(England) Mrs L Shaw	9-0 9-4 9-6
(England) Miss V Marshall	(England) Miss Olga Klingenberg	w/o
(United States) Miss Anne Page	(England) Miss Joan Huntsman	9-5 9-2 9-0
(England) Miss Mary McLintock	(England) Mrs D M Sinclair	9-0 9-2 9-0
(England) Mrs Phyllis Philcox	(England) Mrs Madeline Chichester	9-7 8-10 10-9 4-9 9-5
(England) Miss S Holroyd	(England) Mrs Viola Jeannerat	9-0 9-6 9-2
(England) Miss E Fordham	(England) Miss K Kennedy	9-0 9-2 10-8
(England) Mrs Violet St Clair Morford	(England) Miss B Melville	4-9 9-3 9-2 9-2
(England) Mrs J Higman	(England) Mrs S Knight	9-1 9-4 9-7
(England) Miss A Connell	(England) Miss Wendy St John Maule	9-3 9-7 9-5
(England) Miss U Harris	(England) Mrs Diana Petitpierre	9-6 9-7 9-0
(England) Miss G Lawrence	(England) Miss M King	4-9 9-7 9-2 5-9 9-5
(England) Miss Kathleen Tew	(England) Miss Ursula Foljambe	9-1 9-0 9-0
(England) Mrs Judith Backhouse	(England) Miss Peggy Runge	9-4 9-1 9-2
(England) Miss E M Bain	(England) Miss C Vickers	9-5 9-1 8-10 4-9 9-6
(England) Miss R Sykes	(England) Miss Elizabeth Glascock	9-6 9-1 9-5
(England) Mrs M G Robertson	(United States) Miss Elizabeth Woolsey	w/o
(England) Mrs A Knight	(England) Miss M Grant	9-7 7-9 9-6 9-3
(England) Mrs H J Stribling	(England) Miss F N Fryer	10-9 9-2 9-7
(England) Miss Peggy Phelps	(England) Mrs Fielding-Johnson	9-0 9-1 9-5

=== Second round ===
Player one	Player two	Score
(England) Lumb	(England) Philcox	9-0 9-0 9-0
(England) Green	(England) Holroyd	9-2 9-5 9-7
(England) Cairns	(England) Fordham	9-2 9-6 9-0
(United States) Lamme	(England) Morford	9-4 9-0 9-2
(England) Cooke	(England) Higman	9-4 10-8 9-4
(England) Knox	(England) Connell	9-2 9-0 9-1
(England) Ley	(England) Harris	9-6 9-10 9-3 9-2
(United States) Bowes	(England) Lawrence	9-2 9-0 9-1
(England) McKechnie	(England) Tew	9-0 9-3 9-5
(England) Dawnay	(England) Backhouse	7-9 4-9 9-2 9-7 9-6
(England) Blake	(England) Bain	9-6 2-9 9-5 9-7
(England) Lytton-M	(England) Sykes	9-5 7-9 9-3 9-3
(England) Kelman	(England) Robertson	w/o
(England) Marshall	(England) Knight	7-9 9-5 10-8 9-5
(United States) Page	(England) Stribling	9-0 9-7 9-2
(England) McLintock	(England) Phelps	1-9 6-9 9-5 9-4 9-4

=== Third round ===
Player one	Player two	Score
(England) Lumb	(England) Green	9-0 9-0 9-0
(England) Cairns	(United States) Lamme	5-9 9-1 9-3 9-1
(England) Cooke	(England) Knox	9-10 3-9 9-0 9-6 9-1
(United States) Bowes	(England) Ley	9-4 9-2 9-2
(England) McKechnie	(England) McLintock	4-9 9-3 9-3 9-0
(England) Dawnay	(England) Blake	9-5 9-1 9-2
(England) Lytton-M	(England) Kelman	9-1 5-9 9-0 9-4
(United States) Page	(England) Marshall	7-9 9-5 9-4 9-4

=== Quarter-finals ===
Player one	Player two	Score
(England) Lumb	(England) Cairns	9-2 9-0 9-0
(England) Lytton-M	(United States) Page	6-9 9-0 7-9 9-5 9-6
(England) Cooke	(United States) Bowes	9-6 9-4 9-2
(England) McKechnie	(England) Dawnay	9-0 9-6 9-1

=== Semi-finals ===
Player one	Player two	Score
(England) Lumb	(England) Cooke	9-1 9-0 9-3
(England) Lytton-M	(England) McKechnie	0-9 9-3 9-6 4-9 9-0

=== Final ===
Player one	Player two	Score
(England) Lumb	(England) Lytton-Millbanke	9-5 9-5 9-4

Preceded by 1935	British Open Squash Championships; England (London); 1936	Succeeded by 1937
