= Susan Noel =

English squash and tennis player

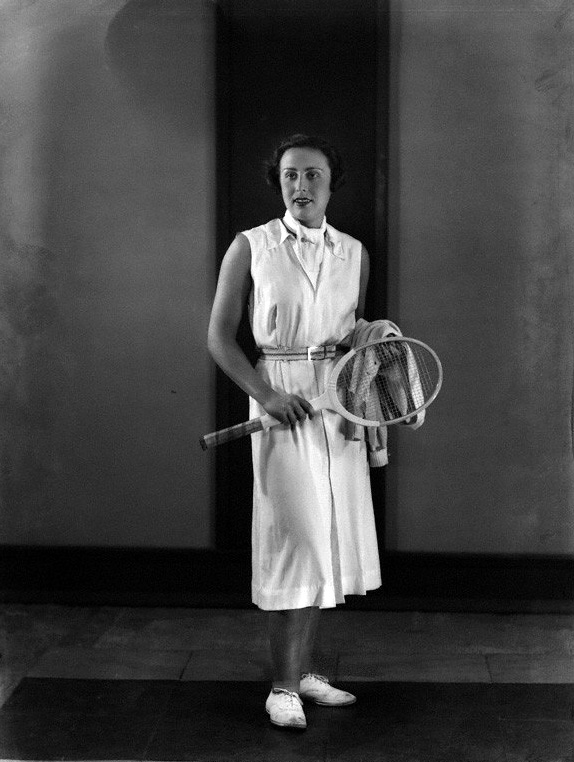
- Susan Noel in 1935

Personal information
- Born: June 1912
- Died: October 1991 (aged 79)

Sport
- Country: England
- Handedness: Right-handed

Women's doubles
- Title: 5
- Tennis career
- Plays: Right-handed

Grand Slam doubles results
- French Open: Runner-up (1936)

Susan Diana Barham Noel-Powell (June 1912 – October 1991) was an English squash and tennis player. Noel was taught to play squash and tennis by her father Evan Noel, a successful racquets player.

== Squash career ==
Noel won the British Open three times in a row from 1932 to 1934. She won the final in straight sets on all three occasions. She was also the runner-up at the championship in 1939 when she lost to Margot Lumb, who had also won the British Open for five consecutive seasons (1935 - 1939).

In 1933, Noel won the U.S. National Championships and the Atlantic Coast Women's Squash Championships, defeating Cecily Fenwick in the final for the latter title.

== Tennis career ==
Partnering Jadwiga Jędrzejowska, Noel finished runner-up in the women's doubles at the French Championships in 1936. Noel and Jędrzejowska lost in the final to Simonne Mathieu and Billie Yorke 2–6, 6–4, 6–4.

== Grand Slam tournaments finals ==
=== Doubles (1 runner-up) ===
Result	Year	Championship	Surface	Partner	Opponents	Score
Loss	1936	French Championships	Clay	(Poland) Jadwiga Jędrzejowska	(France) Simonne Mathieu (United Kingdom) Billie Yorke	6–2, 4–6, 4–6
