= Cecily Fenwick =

English squash player

- Occupation: Squash Player

Cecily Fenwick was an English squash player who won the British Open three times in 1926, 1927 and 1931. She was also the runner-up at the championship three consecutive times from 1928 to 1930, losing in the finals to the Cave sisters (Joyce Cave in 1928, and Nancy Cave in 1929 and 1930).
