= Silvia Huntsman =

English squash player

Silvia Hutsman
Sport
- Country: Great Britain

Silvia Huntsman was an English squash player who won the British Open in 1923. She won the title by defeating her compatriot Nancy Cave in the final with a score of 6–15, 15–9, 17–15.
