= Joyce Cave =

English squash player

Joyce Irene Cave (2 June 1902 – 13 March 1953) was an English squash player who won the inaugural women's British Open tournament in 1922, defeating her older sister Nancy Cave in the final 11–15, 15–10, 15–9. She also won the tournament in 1925 and 1929, defeating Nancy Cave and Cecily Fenwick, respectively, in the final. She was one of three sisters who participated in the British Open. Her sister Nancy also won the title on three occasions and their oldest sister Margorie Maude Cave competed in 1922. All three sisters were taught by their father Harold Watkin Cave who was a rackets player during the 1880s.
