= Nancy Cave =

English squash player

Nancy Frances Cave (2 March 1896 – 1989) was an English squash player who won the British Open three times, in 1924, 1929 and 1930. She was also the runner-up in the championship six times, in 1922 (losing to her younger sister Joyce Cave), 1923, 1925 (losing to Joyce Cave), 1926, 1927 and 1931. She was one of three sisters that participated in the British Open, her sister Joyce Cave also won the title on three occasions and her older sister Margorie Maude Cave competed the inaugural British Open in 1922. All three sisters were taught by their father Harold Watkin Cave who was a rackets player during the 1880s.
