= Queen's Club =

Private sporting club in West Kensington, London, England

- Formation: 1886; 140 years ago
- Type: Private members' club
- Purpose: Sport
- Location(s): West Kensington; London, W14; United Kingdom
- Coordinates: 51°29′15″N 0°12′42″W
- Chief executive: Ross Niland (as of 2019)
- Website: www.queensclub.co.uk

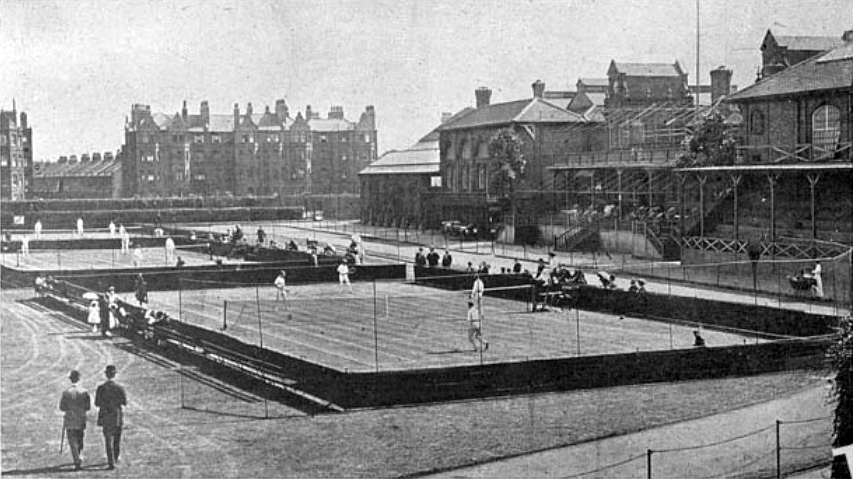
Three grass courts in front of the pavilion at the Queen's Club

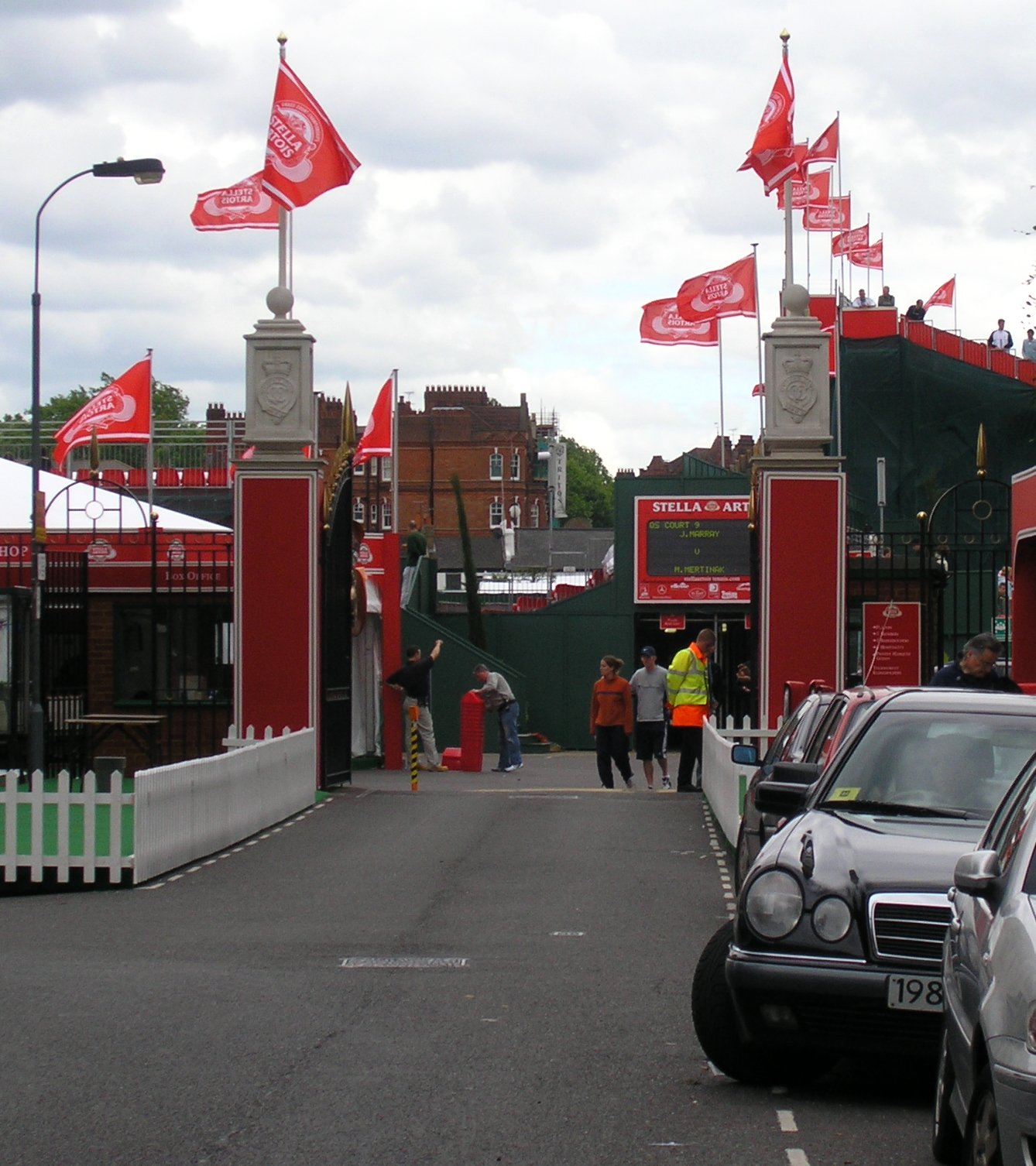
Entrance to Queen's Club during preparations for the 2005 Queen's Club Championships

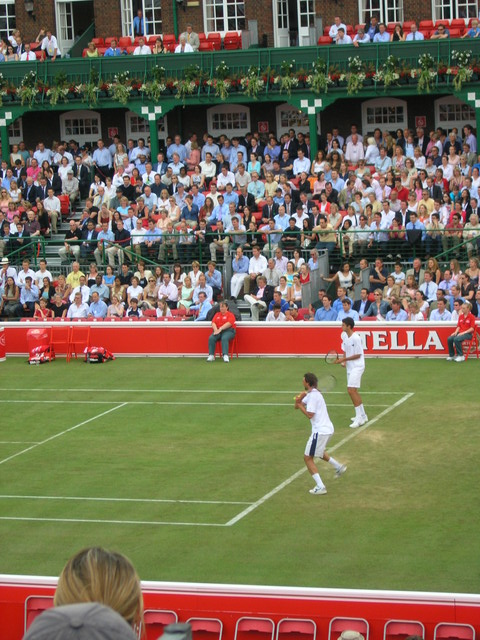
Goran Ivanišević and Mario Ančić playing doubles during the 2004 Queen's Club Championships

The Queen's Club is a private sporting club in Barons Court, West Kensington, London, England. The club hosts the annual Queen's Club Championships grass court lawn tennis tournament (currently known as the "HSBC Championships" for sponsorship reasons). It has 28 outdoor courts and ten indoor. With two courts, it is also the national headquarters of real tennis, hosting the British Open every year except in 2020 due to the coronavirus pandemic. The Queen's Club also has rackets and squash courts; it became the headquarters for both sports after the closure of the Prince's Club in 1940.

== History ==
Founded as The Queen's Club Limited on 19 August 1886 by Evan Charteris, George Francis and Algernon Grosvener, the Queen's Club was the world's second multipurpose sports complex, after the Prince's Club, and became the world's only multipurpose sports complex when the Prince's Club relocated to Knightsbridge and lost its outdoor sports facilities. The club is named after Queen Victoria, its first patron. The first lawn tennis courts were opened on 19 May 1887, and the first sporting event was held on 1 and 2 July 1887 when Oxford played Cambridge. The club buildings were opened in January 1888, having taken about 18 months to construct. William Marshall, finalist of the inaugural 1877 Wimbledon Championships was the architect. Among the initial sports offered at the club were real tennis, Eton Fives, rackets, lawn tennis (grass courts and covered courts), football, rugby and athletics. Cricket was also played, but not as an organised sport. The University Sports meeting between Cambridge and Oxford was held at the Queen's Club from 1888 to 1928.

Queen's Club was the venue of the covered courts (indoor) tennis, jeu de paume (real tennis) and rackets events of the 1908 Summer Olympics. On 7 March 1914 George V attended the Navy v Army rugby match. The army won by four goals and two tries to the navy's three tries.

Until 1922, the club was the main ground for the football games of Corinthian F.C. One international was held, between England and Wales on 18 March 1895, the result being a 1–1 draw.

=== Sale of Queen's Club ===
On 13 September 2005, the Lawn Tennis Association (LTA), the governing body of British lawn tennis, which had owned Queen's since 1953, put the club up for sale. The terms required that the rackets club and the Queen's Club Championships remain unaffected (the site's value for residential or commercial redevelopment might greatly exceed its value as a sports club, in the event that planning permission could be obtained, and the LTA wished to preserve the club's role in British tennis).

On 8 March 2006, the LTA announced that it would sell to club members for £45 million, ending seven months of uncertainty about the club's future. However some members disputed the LTA's right to sell the club, which they contested it merely held in trust on their behalf, and began to raise funds to dispute the sale in court. In December 2006, the two sides reached an out-of-court settlement in which the sale price was reduced to £35 million.

In February 2007, the LTA relocated its headquarters from Queen's Club to the new National Tennis Centre in Roehampton. The Queen's Championships remains one of the six most popular grass competitions on the men's ATP tour, along with the Halle Open in Germany, the Lexus International in Eastbourne, the Hall of Fame Open in Rhode Island, the Rosmalen Championships in the Netherlands, and Wimbledon.

The ball girls are selected from year 8, 9, and 10 pupils at St Philomena's Catholic High School for Girls in South London and Nonsuch High School for Girls in Surrey.

== See also ==
- All England Lawn Tennis and Croquet Club — London's other famous tennis club
- British Covered Court Championships
- Queen's Club Covered Court Championship
- The "Pioneer Exhibition Game" in London (1916)
- List of tennis stadiums by capacity
- Queen's Club Gardens

Preceded by First Edition	Fed Cup; Final Venue; 1963	Succeeded by Germantown Cricket Club; Philadelphia
