= 1934 Men's British Open Squash Championship =

British Open Squash Championships
- 4th British Open Championships

Details
- Location: London, England
- Venue: Conservative Club & Bath Club

Then 1934 Open Championship featured the defending open champion and amateur champion F. D. Amr Bey of Egypt being challenged by Don Butcher the professional champion. The first leg was held at Butcher's Conservative Club on 12 November, but it was Bey once again who prevailed winning three games to one. The second leg took place on 19 November at the Bath Club, Bey at his home club was given his sternest test yet finally winning three games to two.

== Results ==
=== First leg ===
Conservative Club
(England) Don Butcher	4	10	8	0
(Egypt) F. D. Amr Bey	9	8	10	9

=== Second leg ===
Bath Club
(England) Don Butcher	6	9	2	9	5
(Egypt) F. D. Amr Bey	9	6	9	0	9

Preceded by 1933	British Open Squash Championships; England (London); 1934	Succeeded by 1935
