= 1932 Men's British Open Squash Championship =

British Open Squash Championships
- 3rd British Open Championships

Details
- Location: London, England
- Venue: Conservative Club & Bath Club

The 1932 Open Championship saw professional champion Don Butcher defend his title against amateur champion F. D. Amr Bey of Egypt. The first leg was held at Butcher's home club the Conservative Club on 24 October, and he lost to Bey three games to nil. The second leg was held at the Bath Club on 31 October, the home club of Bey and the match was considerably closer before Bey ran out a three games to two winner.

== Results ==
=== First leg ===
Conservative Club
(England) Don Butcher	0	7	1
(Egypt) F. D. Amr Bey	9	9	9

=== Second leg ===
Bath Club
(England) Don Butcher	9	9	2	1	0
(Egypt) F. D. Amr Bey	5	5	9	9	9

Preceded by 1931	British Open Squash Championships; England (London); 1932	Succeeded by 1933
