= 1930 Men's British Open Squash Championship =

Squash Tournament

British Open Squash Championships
- 1st British Open Championships

Details
- Location: London, England
- Venue: Queen's Club & Conservative Club

The 1930 Squash Rackets Open Championship of Great Britain was the first edition of the British Open Squash Championships inaugurated in 1930 so that both professionals and amateurs could play each other. The champion could be challenged by another player, normally either the professional or amateur champion for the right to earn the title of champion of Great Britain. The designated champion in 1929 was Charles Read and the challenger was the much younger Don Butcher.

The first leg was held on Sunday 7 December at the Queen's Club, West Kensington, home club to Read. The second leg was held on Monday 15 December 1930 at the Conservative Club, London, where Butcher was head professional. If the championship ended in one match each a neutral venue would have been used to determine the winner but Butcher won both matches.

== Draw and results ==
=== First leg ===
Queen's Club
(England) Charles Read	6	5	5
(England) Don Butcher	9	9	9

=== Second leg ===
Conservative Club
(England) Don Butcher	9	9	9
(England) Charles Read	3	5	3

Preceded by 1929	British Open Squash Championships; England (London); 1930	Succeeded by 1931
