= 1935 Men's British Open Squash Championship =

British Open Squash Championships
- 5th British Open Championships

Details
- Location: London, England
- Venue: Bath Club & Royal Automobile Club

The 1935 Open Championship featured the defending open champion F. D. Amr Bey of Egypt being challenged by Jim Dear the professional champion. The first leg was held at the Bath Club on 25 November. Bey from the Bath Club won the first leg three games to two. The second leg took place at Dear's home club the Royal Automobile Club on 2 December . Bey wrapped up his third consecutive Open Championship title by clinching the second leg three games to one.

== Results ==
=== First leg ===
Bath Club
(Egypt) F. D. Amr Bey	9	6	8	9	9
(England) Jim Dear	3	9	10	2	4

=== Second leg ===
Royal Automobile Club
(Egypt) F. D. Amr Bey	9	9	3	9
(England) Jim Dear	4	7	9	7

Preceded by 1934	British Open Squash Championships; England (London); 1935	Succeeded by 1936
