= 1931 Men's British Open Squash Championship =

British Open Squash Championships
- 2nd British Open Championships

Details
- Location: London, England
- Venue: Conservative Club & Bath Club

The 1931 Professional Squash Rackets Championship of Great Britain saw Don Butcher defend his title against Charles Arnold. The first leg was held at Butcher's home club the Conservative Club on 9 November and he defeated Arnold in just eighteen minutes. The first game lasted just three and a half minutes. The second leg was held at the Bath Club on 16 November, the home club of Arnold but once again Butcher ran out an easy winner.

== Results ==
=== First leg ===
Conservative Club
(England) Don Butcher	9	9	9
(England) Charles Arnold	0	0	0

=== Second leg ===
Bath Club
(England) Don Butcher	9	9	9
(England) Charles Arnold	3	0	5

Preceded by 1930	British Open Squash Championships; England (London); 1931	Succeeded by 1932
