= 1936 Men's British Open Squash Championship =

British Open Squash Championships
- 6th British Open Championships

Details
- Location: London, England
- Venue: Bath Club & Royal Automobile Club

The 1936 Open Championship featured the defending open champion F. D. Amr Bey of Egypt being challenged by Jim Dear the professional champion. The first leg was held at the Royal Automobile Club on 16 November. Bey from the Bath Club won the first leg three games to two, despite some criticism over his use of the shot against the back wall to continue a rally, it was felt that he used this shot too much. The second leg took place at Bey's home Bath Club on 23 November. Bey won his fourth consecutive Open Championship title by clinching the second leg three games to one.

== Results ==
=== First leg ===
Royal Automobile Club
(Egypt) F. D. Amr Bey	9	7	9	5	9
(England) Jim Dear	7	9	7	9	6

=== Second leg ===
Bath Club
(Egypt) F. D. Amr Bey	9	8	9	9
(England) Jim Dear	6	10	1	6

Preceded by 1935	British Open Squash Championships; England (London); 1936	Succeeded by 1937
