= 1933 Men's British Open Squash Championship =

British Open Squash Championships
- British Open Championships

Details
- Location: London, England
- Venue: N/A

There was no Open Championship held in 1933, the defending champion F. D. Amr Bey of Egypt was busy defending his Amateur championship whilst defending professional champion Don Butcher resisted a challenge from Jim Dear. This professional challenge determined who would meet Bey in 1934 for the Open Championship.
The result of the professional championship challenge is below.

== Results ==
=== First leg ===
Conservative Club (20 Nov)
(England) Don Butcher	9	9	9
(England) Jim Dear	2	3	5

=== Second leg ===
Princes Club, Knightsbridge (27 Nov)
(England) Don Butcher	9	9	1	4	10
(England) Jim Dear	6	7	9	9	8

Preceded by 1932	British Open Squash Championships; England (London); 1933	Succeeded by 1934
