= 74 St James's Street =

Former clubhouse in London

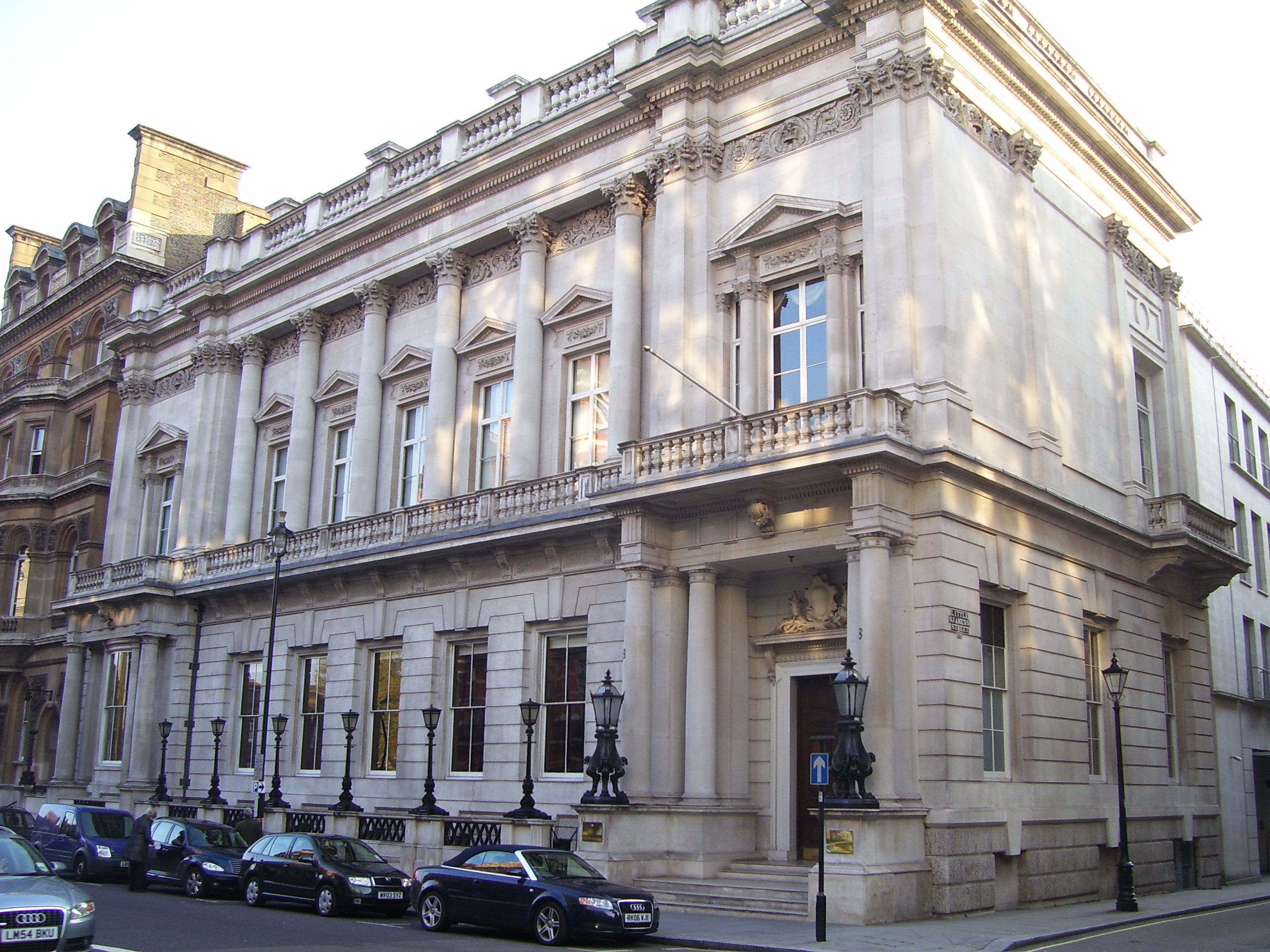

General information
- Type: Office
- Architectural style: Gothic Revival
- Location: St James, London, England
- Coordinates: 51°30′19″N 0°08′19″W
- Completed: 1845

Design and construction
- Architects: George Basevi and Sydney Smirke

Listed Building – Grade II*
- Official name: 74, ST JAMES STREET SW1
- Designated: 06 May 1969
- Reference no.: 1271896

74 St James's Street is a Grade II* listed building in the St James's district of London built to house the Conservative Club and since converted to offices.

== History ==
The site was formerly occupied by the Thatched House Tavern. In 1842 a competition was held for the design of the clubhouse for the Conservative Club which was won by George Basevi and Sydney Smirke who would serve as its architect. The building was completed in 1845.

Following bomb damage during the Second World War, the Bath Club's clubhouse would burn down. After briefly relocating to the Lansdowne Club they would then move into 74 St James's Street. By 1950, the Bath Club would merge with the Conservative Club adopting the name of the former, but continuing to use the premises of the latter until 1959, after which parts of the back of the clubhouse were demolished, including a library and dining room.

In 2003, the building was transformed into offices by Squire and Partners.

== Design ==
The building is Italianate in design, notably using a more developed and ostentatious style of neoclassicism than had previously been popular, such as that used by the nearby Carlton Club. The interior includes a frieze of roses, thistles and shamrocks, representing England, Scotland and Ireland, located in the drawing room. The former stairhall involves Cinquecento inspired design, popular in the 1840s, with domed roof and mosaic pavement completed by John Marriott Blashfield.

Originally built in Caen stone, the facade was largely replaced by Portland stone in 1866.

== See also ==
- Conservative Club
- Bath Club
- St James's Street
