= 1929 Men's British Open Squash Championship =

In 1929 Charles Read was designated the Squash Rackets Open Champion of Great Britain.
It was decided that from 1930 on, both professionals and amateurs could play each other in a new event called the Squash Rackets Open Championship of Great Britain. The champion could be challenged by another player, normally either the professional or amateur champion for the right to earn the title of champion of Great Britain.
The designated champion was Charles Read based on previous professional challenge results listed below.

== Results ==
=== 1907 ===
Bath Club
(England) Charles Read	15	15
(England) C Bannister	5	13

=== 1908 ===
Queen's Club
(England) Charles Read	15	15
(England) James Tomkinson	11	3

=== 1920 ===
Queen's Club
(England) Charles Read	15	15
(England) 'Oke' Johnson

=== 1928 ===
Queen's Club
(England) Charles Read	15	15
(England) 'Oke' Johnson

Preceded by none	British Open Squash Championships; England (London); 1929	Succeeded by 1930
