= Wilfred Andrews =

British automotive chairman (1892–1975)

- Born: 1892
- Died: 1975 (aged 82–83)
- Occupation: Chairman of the Royal Automobile Club

Wilfred Andrews (1892–1975) was chairman of the Royal Automobile Club (RAC) and the first British president of FIA.

He was instrumental in securing the use of RAF Silverstone as a motor-racing venue: Silverstone Circuit.

He appeared as a castaway on the BBC Radio programme Desert Island Discs on 27 June 1966.
