= Conservative Club, Edinburgh =

Gentlemen's club in Scotland

The Conservative Club, also known as The Scottish Conservative Club, was an Edinburgh Gentlemen's club founded in the late 1870s, and from 1880 located at 112 Princes Street. As the name implies, the club was politically aligned to the Conservatives.

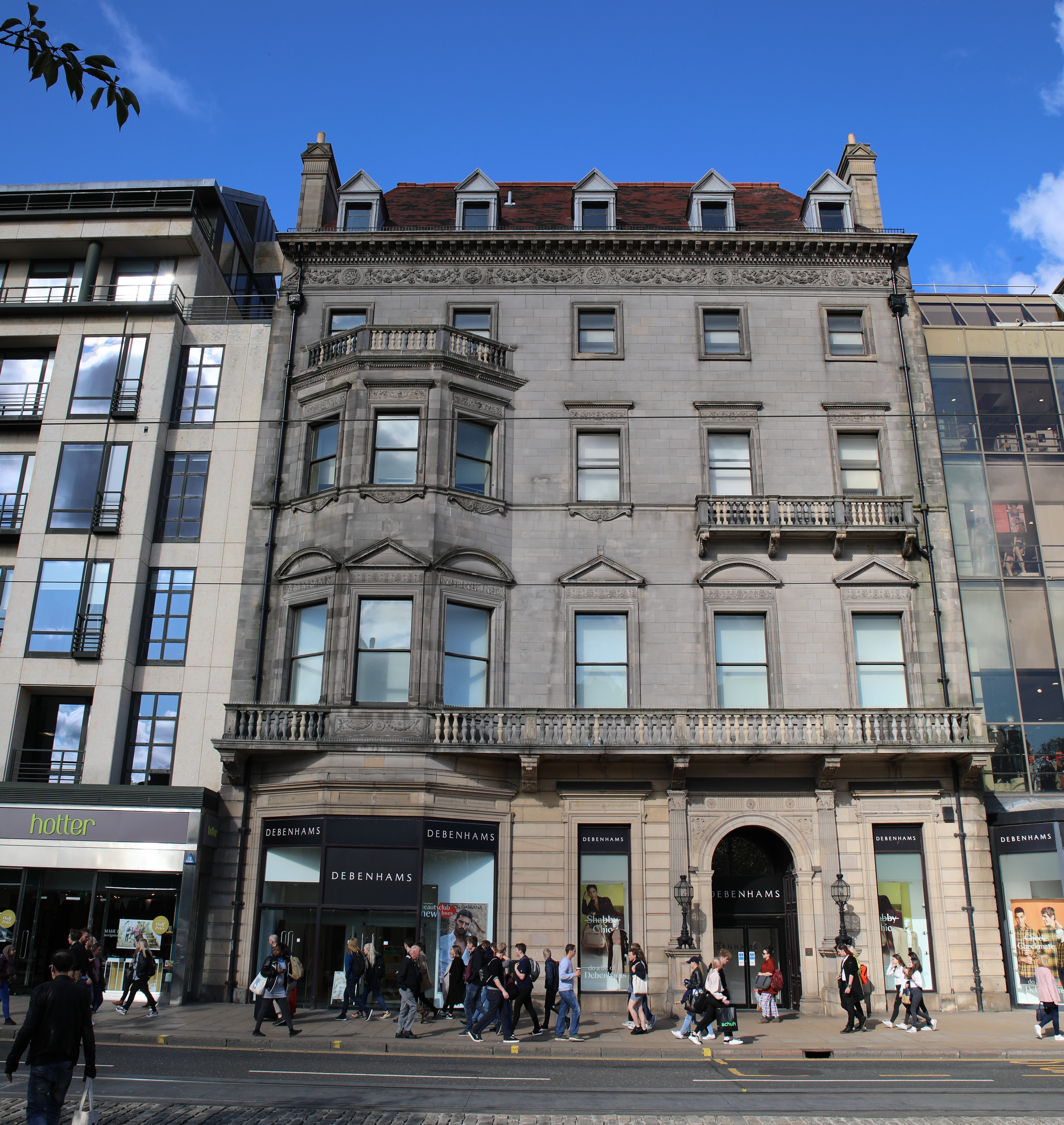
112 Princes Street (The former Conservative Club) and 109 Princes Street (The former Scottish Liberal Club)

== History ==
In 1880, the club moved to a club house on Princes Street designed by Arthur Colville. It opened officially on 1 February 1884. The new clubhouse had an elaborate carved timber stair turning round a 2-storey arcade, against 3 stained glass windows by James Ballantyne and Son.

In 1978, department store Debenhams took over the property, as well as The Scottish Liberal Club next door, and knocked through turning both into a department store.

== Present use ==
In 2021, the clubhouse, along with the former clubhouse of The Scottish Liberal Club, received planning permission for conversion into a hotel. In 2024, new plans were announced. On 9 July 2026, the building was destroyed by fire.

== See also ==
- Conservative Club
