= Galliffet trousers =

Style of trousers

Galliffet or gallifet (Russian: галифе, romanized: galife) were a style of trousers worn as part of the military uniform of (for example) the Soviet Army. They were similar to riding breeches, but adapted to fit in jackboots. Russian dictionaries define "galife" as pants, close-fitting at the knees and below – to easily fit the sapogi (Russian: сапоги, lit. 'jackboots') – and expanding from above the knees.

They were named after French general Gaston Alexandre Auguste, Marquis de Galliffet (1830–1909), who introduced them for use by cavalrymen.

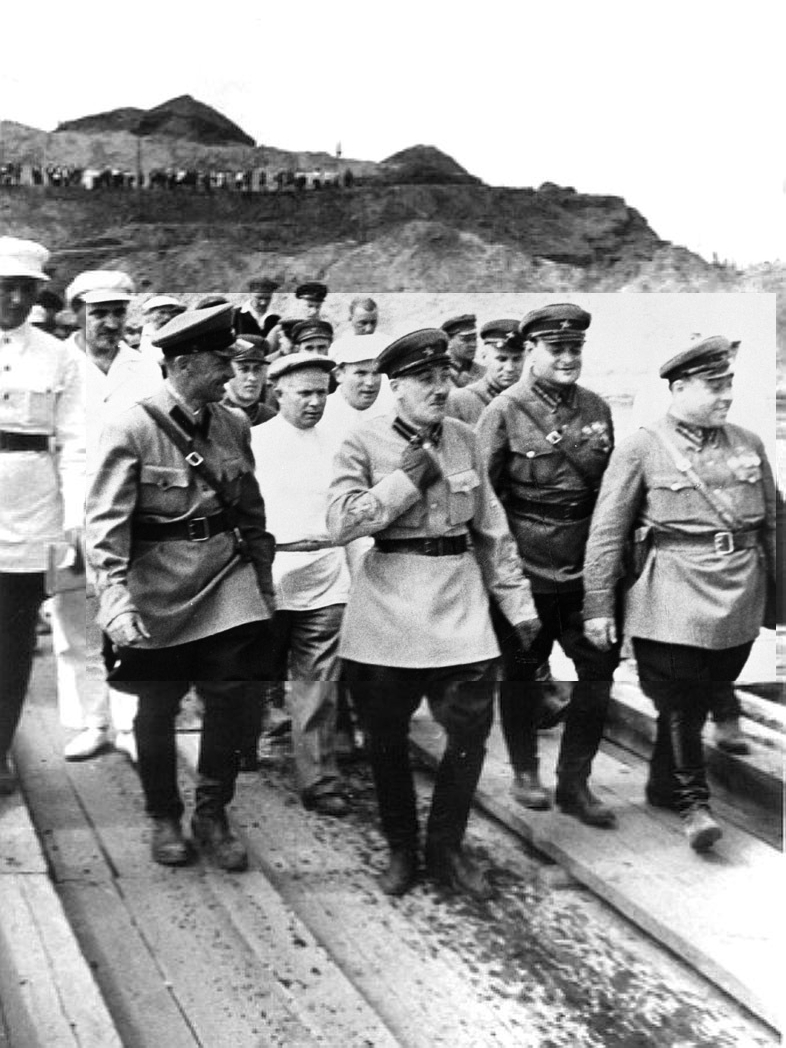
High ranking NKVD officers, 1935, with Genrikh Yagoda, center. Nikita Khrushchev right behind him

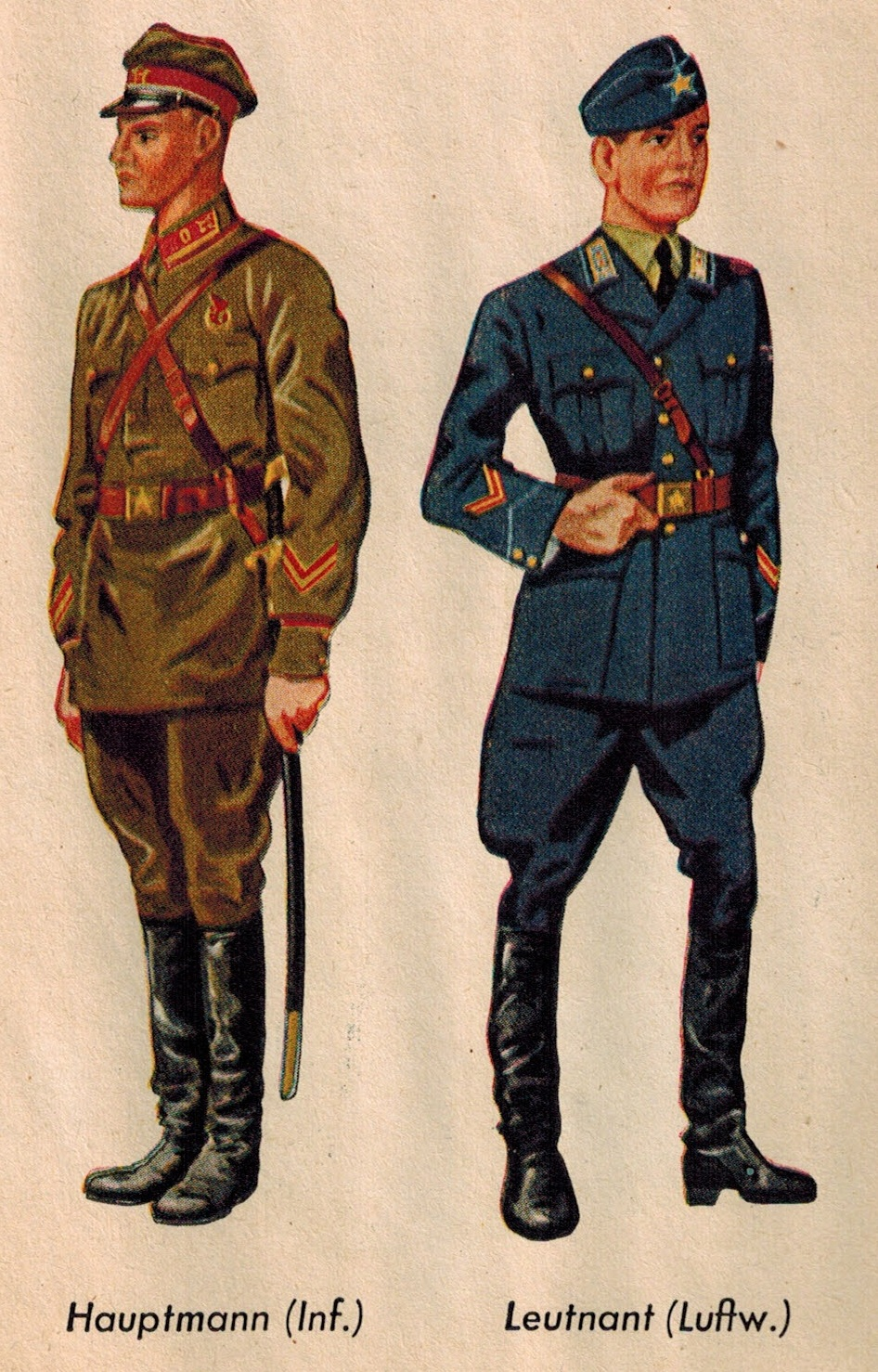
A depiction of Soviet uniforms from the German Army pocketbook

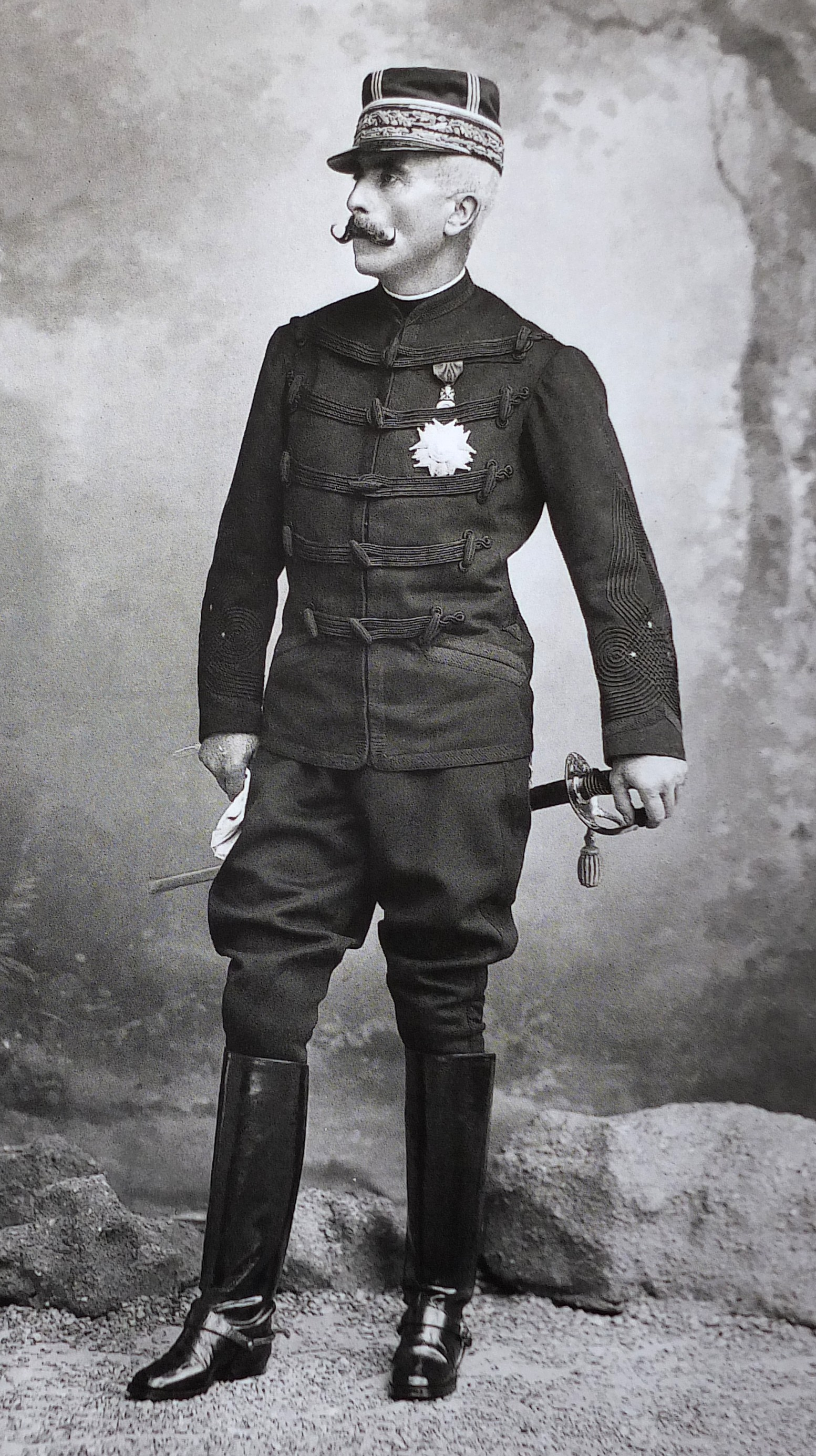
General Gaston Galliffet, 1893

== See also ==
- Uniforms of the Russian Armed Forces
- Jodhpurs
