= Charles Read (squash player) =

English squash player

Charles Richard Read (1 March 1889 – date of death unknown) was a professional squash player from England, where professional squash began in 1907. Read was based at the Queen's Club in London, and beat C. Bannister of the Bath Club 15–5, 15–13 at the Bath Club to win the first English professional championship title. Read then defended his title as English champion three more times until 1928.

Read was born in Kensington, London to Alfred, a whitesmith, and Clara Read. When the British Open men's championship was instituted in 1930, Read was officially designated the first title holder, and thus played in the first final as the 'defending champion'. The 41-year-old Read, however, lost the inaugural final series, played in home and away legs, 6–9, 5–9, 5–9 and 3–9, 5–9, 3–9 in December 1930 to the 25-year-old challenger Don Butcher, a professional player from the Conservative Club in London.

Read was a versatile sportsman, having also been British professional champion at Lawn Tennis and Rackets.
