= Jodhpurs =

Full-hipped riding trousers

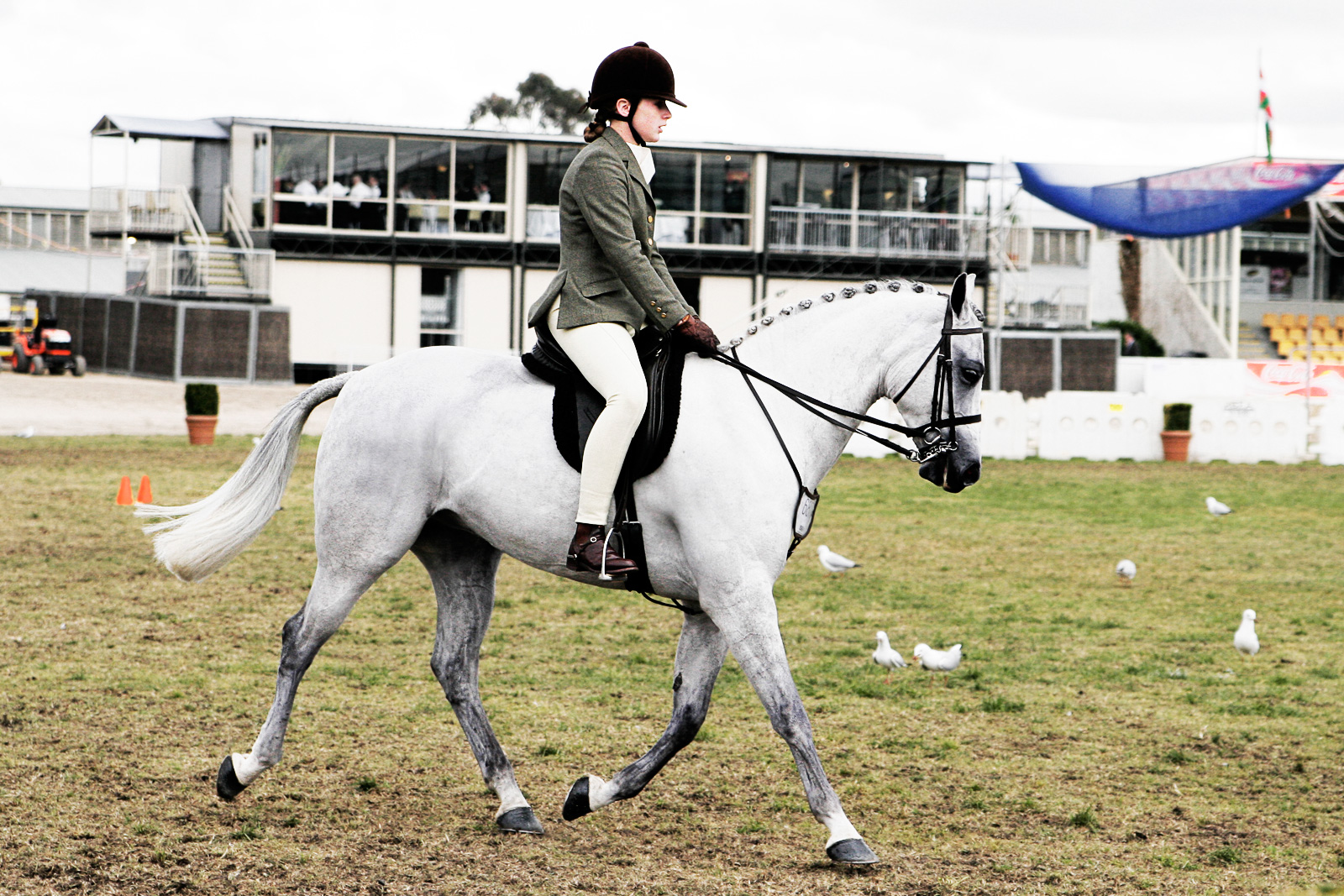
A horse show competitor wearing contemporary stretch-fabric jodhpurs

Jodhpurs /ˈdʒɒdpərz/, in their modern form, are tight-fitting trousers to the ankle, where they end in a snug cuff, and are worn primarily for horse riding. The term is also used as slang for a type of short riding boot, also called a paddock boot or a jodhpur boot, because they are worn with jodhpurs.

Originally, jodhpurs were snug-fitting from just below the knee to the ankle, and were flared at the hip to allow ease for sitting in the saddle. Modern jodhpurs are made with stretch fabric and are tight-fitting throughout. They are supportive and flexible.

== History ==
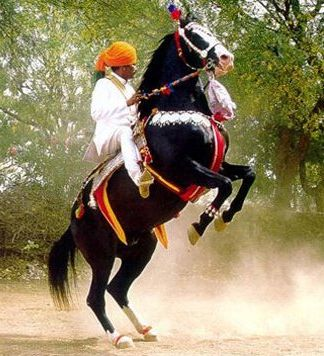
Marwari horse in Rajasthan. Note the traditional long riding trousers, tight around the calf, reaching to Mojari slippers.

Jodhpurs are named after Jodhpur (as the Jodhpur State, also known as the Kingdom of Marwar), the second-largest city in the modern Indian state of Rajasthan. They were adapted from traditional clothing of the Indian subcontinent as long trousers, reaching to the ankle, snug from the calf to the ankle, with reinforced fabric protecting the inner calf and knee from rubbing. The thighs and hips were flared, a traditional Indian style that allowed free movement of the hip and thigh while riding.

The jodhpurs were adapted from an ancient style of Indian trouser called the churidar, which is tight around the calf and loose at the hips. It is still worn at traditional Jodhpuri weddings. This is a special traditional style of clothing in Northern India, especially in what is today the modern state of Rajasthan.

Pratap Singh, a younger son of the Maharaja of Jodhpur, Takht Singh, popularised in England the style of riding trousers worn in Jodhpur, a design that he apparently improved and perfected and first had tailored in India around 1890.

Singh was an avid polo player. When he visited Queen Victoria in England during her Diamond Jubilee celebrations of 1897, he brought his entire polo team, who caused a sensation among the fashionable circles of the United Kingdom by their riding clothes. In addition, they won many polo matches. Singh's jodhpur style of flared thigh and hip was rapidly taken up by the British polo-playing community, who adapted it to the existing designs of English riding breeches, which ended snugly at mid-calf, and were worn with tall riding boots.

The full-legged design of the true Jodhpur was not adopted as British polo apparel. Early photographs of European polo teams show the continued use of tall boots and breeches. Though the term "jodhpurs" was applied colloquially to this style of breeches, they were not true jodhpurs and are more accurately termed "flared-hip breeches". This British version was soon being produced by Savile Row tailors in London. The use of the Indian-style, ankle-length Jodhpurs allowed riders to use short, less expensive boots, as their calves were protected by the reinforced design and snug fit.

== Use ==
=== Riding ===
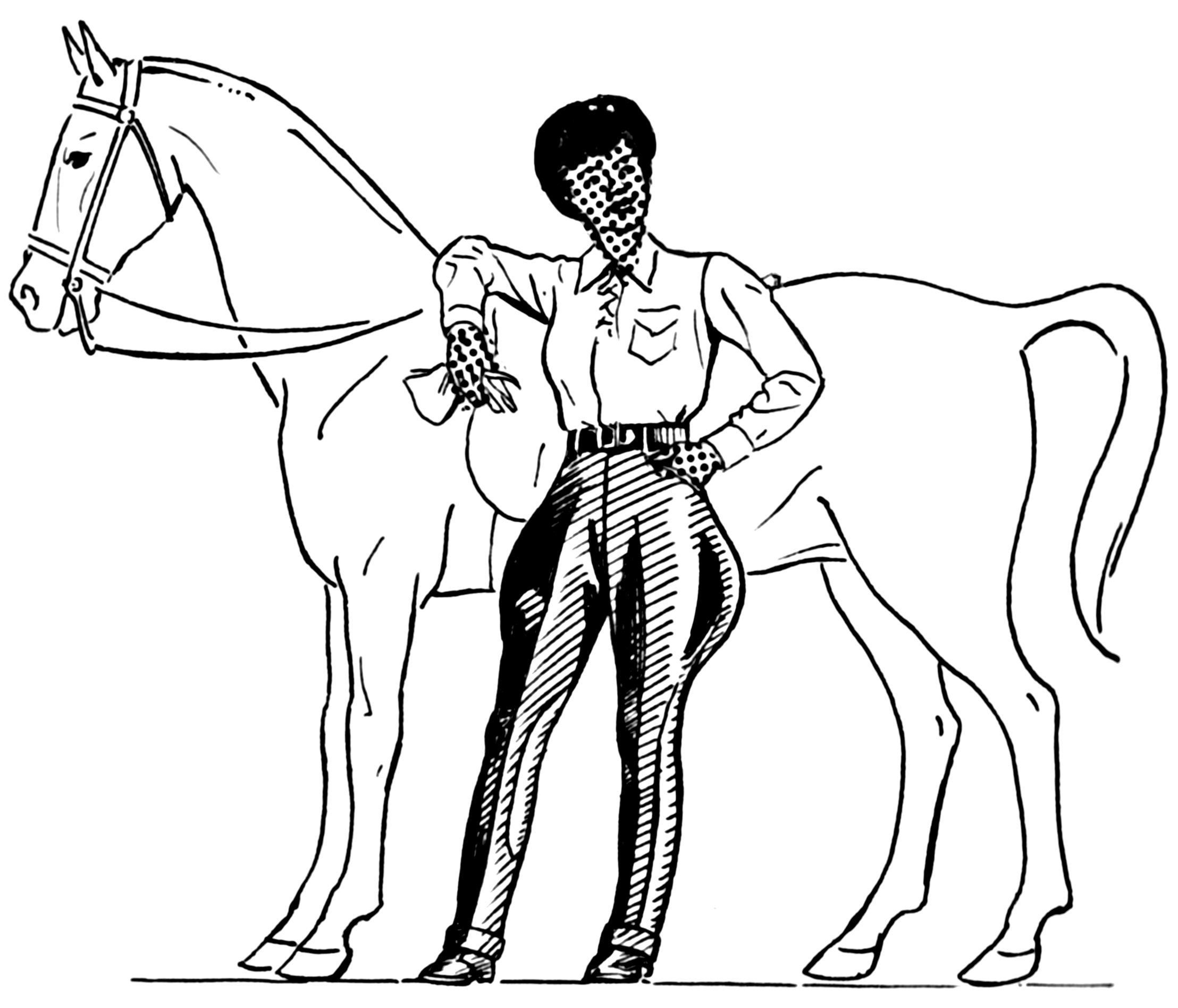
Classic riding jodhpurs, showing the extra width in the thigh area, which allows for lateral leg movement when in the saddle.

Special adaptations for riding include a pattern cut with the leg seams on the outside of the leg; a patch on the inside of the knee, sometimes of a hard-wearing material such as leather; and in some cases a similar leather or leather-like panel on the seat that helps the rider stay still in the saddle. Classic jodhpurs are beige or white, but for working purposes are now made in a variety of colours. They are particularly well-suited for children, as the shorter paddock boots cost less than tall boots to replace as a child's feet grow.

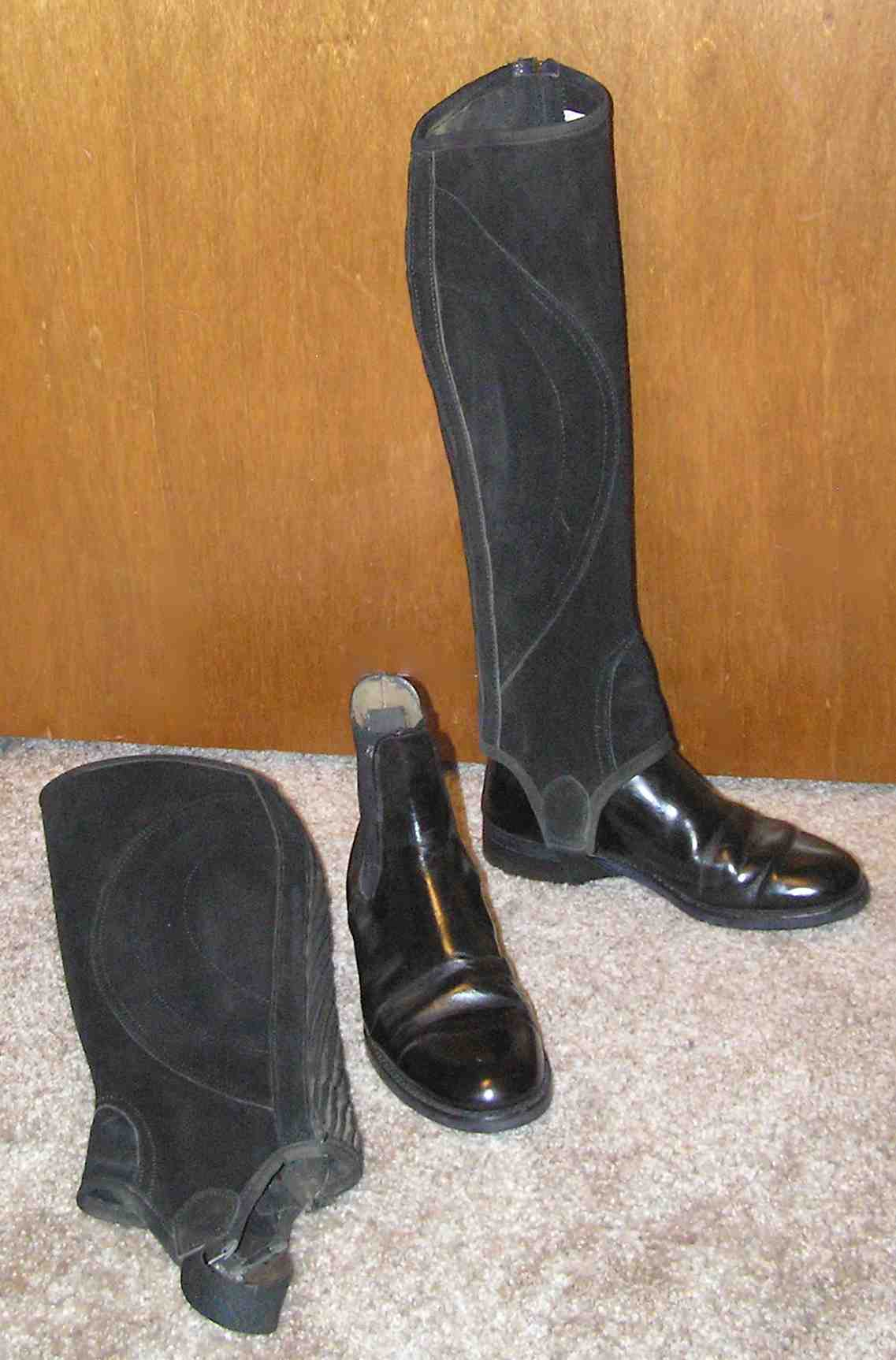
Jodhpur boots, also called paddock boots, are worn with jodhpurs, but also may be worn with breeches if half-chaps are added which provide the functionality and look of a tall riding boot

The word "jodhpurs" is often used interchangeably with riding breeches, though this is technically incorrect. Breeches are riding pants that come down to about mid-calf, and are designed to be worn with long stockings and tall boots. Jodhpurs are ankle length and are worn with short, ankle-high Jodhpur boots, also known as paddock boots. Sometimes knee-length half-chaps or leggings may be added.

=== Occupational uniform ===
Jodhpurs are sometimes worn as fashion or occupational clothing. In popular culture, jodhpur-style breeches worn with tall boots became particularly associated with military officers, who wore uniforms based on riding apparel, often derived from the aristocratic cavalry tradition from which many nations historically drew their corps of top commanders, viz. the quartering of the commander-in-chief of the forces and secretary at war in the Horse Guards building and the derivation of the rank and title marshal from what was originally a title for the commander of cavalry.

Flared-hip breeches and tall boots formed part of the military uniform of army officers in Imperial Germany, the Second Polish Republic, Nazi Germany, and many Eastern Bloc countries, including the former USSR and East Germany..

Jodhpurs, or flared-hip breeches, also were adopted as the uniform for some forces of motorcycle police.

The style came to be associated with authority figures in general and was copied by certain Hollywood movie directors in the United States.

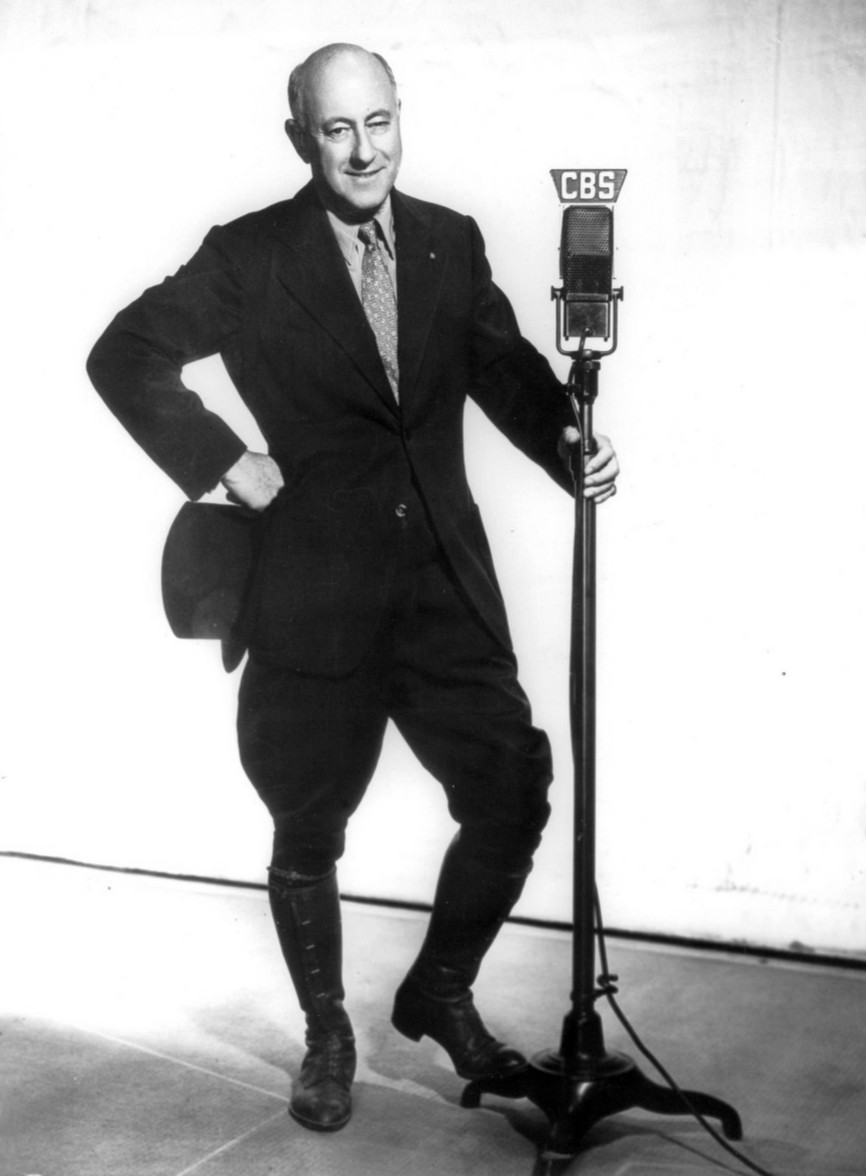
Cecil B. DeMille, 1937, wearing the flared-hip riding breeches that are often termed jodhpurs.

Early 20th-century African big game hunters are also associated with the look, due in part to early traditions of riding on horseback in search of quarry. In addition, tall boots protected against snakes and rough or thornbushes if the hunters were walking in rough country.

=== Fashion ===
Women began wearing jodhpurs during the 1920s, as they shifted away from riding horses sidesaddle and rode them astride. One of the first high-profile women to adopt the wearing of jodhpurs was Coco Chanel. She was inspired to copy the breeches as worn by a friend's groom.

As part of the 20th-century trend of crossover fashions moving from sportswear to streetwear, various designers since the later 20th century have incorporated equestrian styles into their clothing, including jodhpurs. Ralph Lauren is the most well-known of such designers, and adapted equestrian styles and motifs as the basis of his Ralph Lauren Polo line. (Polo/Ralph Lauren presented "Man and the Horse", an exhibit of riding clothing and accoutrements from three centuries at the Metropolitan Museum of New York Costume Institute in 1984, curated by Diana Vreeland.)

== Kentucky jodhpurs ==
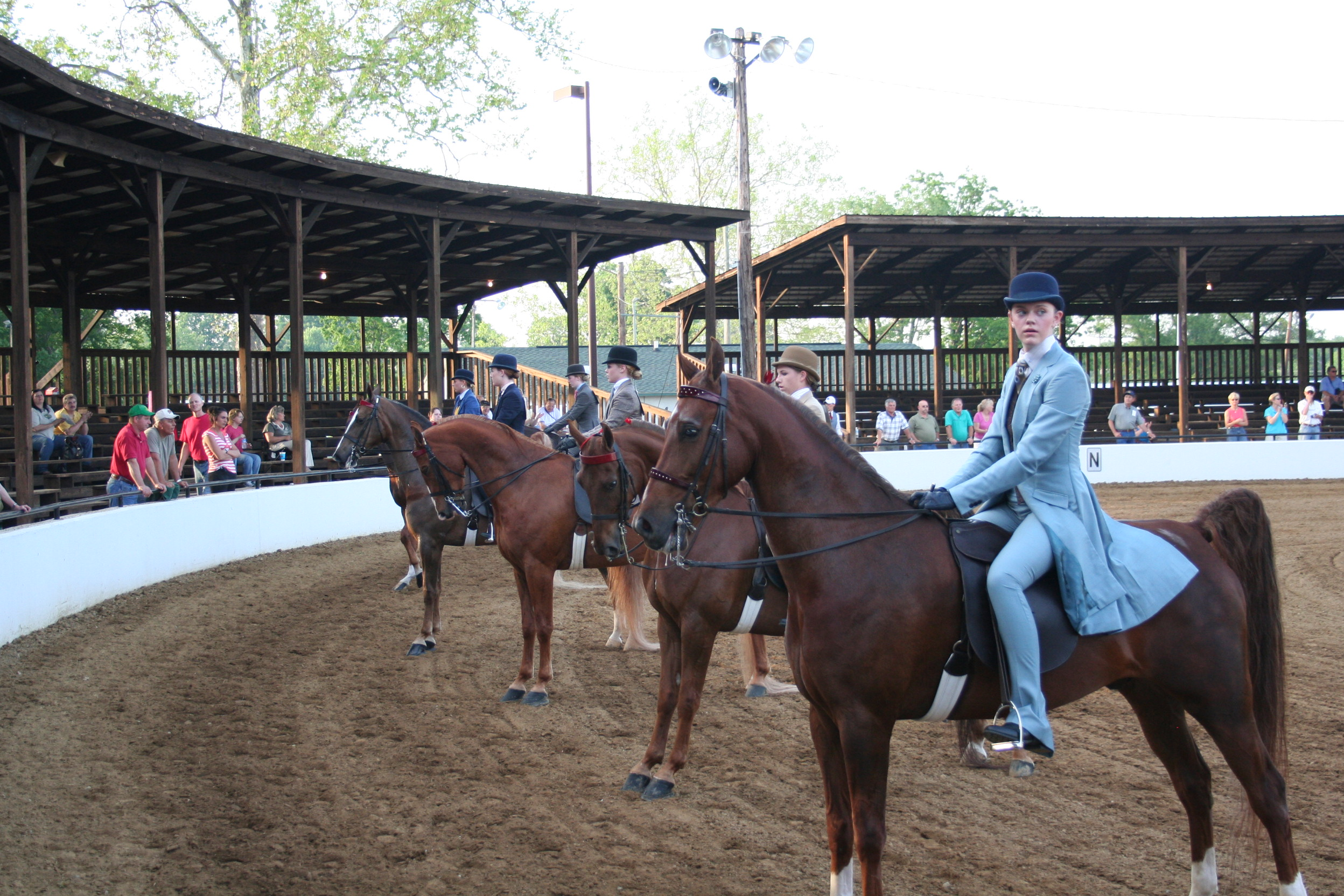
A rider wearing Kentucky jodhpurs.

Kentucky jodhpurs are full-length riding pants designed exclusively for saddle seat riding. Like hunt seat jodhpurs, they are close-fitting from waist to ankle. They are noticeably longer, ending with a flared bell bottom that fits over a jodhpur boot, usually extending below the heel of the boot in back, and covering the arch of the foot (but not the toe) in front. The overall look gives the impression of a rider with a long leg and heel lower than the toe, a desired equitation standard for this riding style. Like the hunt seat jodhpur, they have elastic straps that run under the boot to help hold the pant leg in place. Saddle seat riders, whose riding clothing styles were derived from men's business suits, wear Kentucky Jodhpurs in dark colors, usually black, navy blue, or a shade that matches the riding coat.
