= Thatched House Tavern =

Former public house in Westminster London

Coordinates: 51.505558°N 0.138607°W

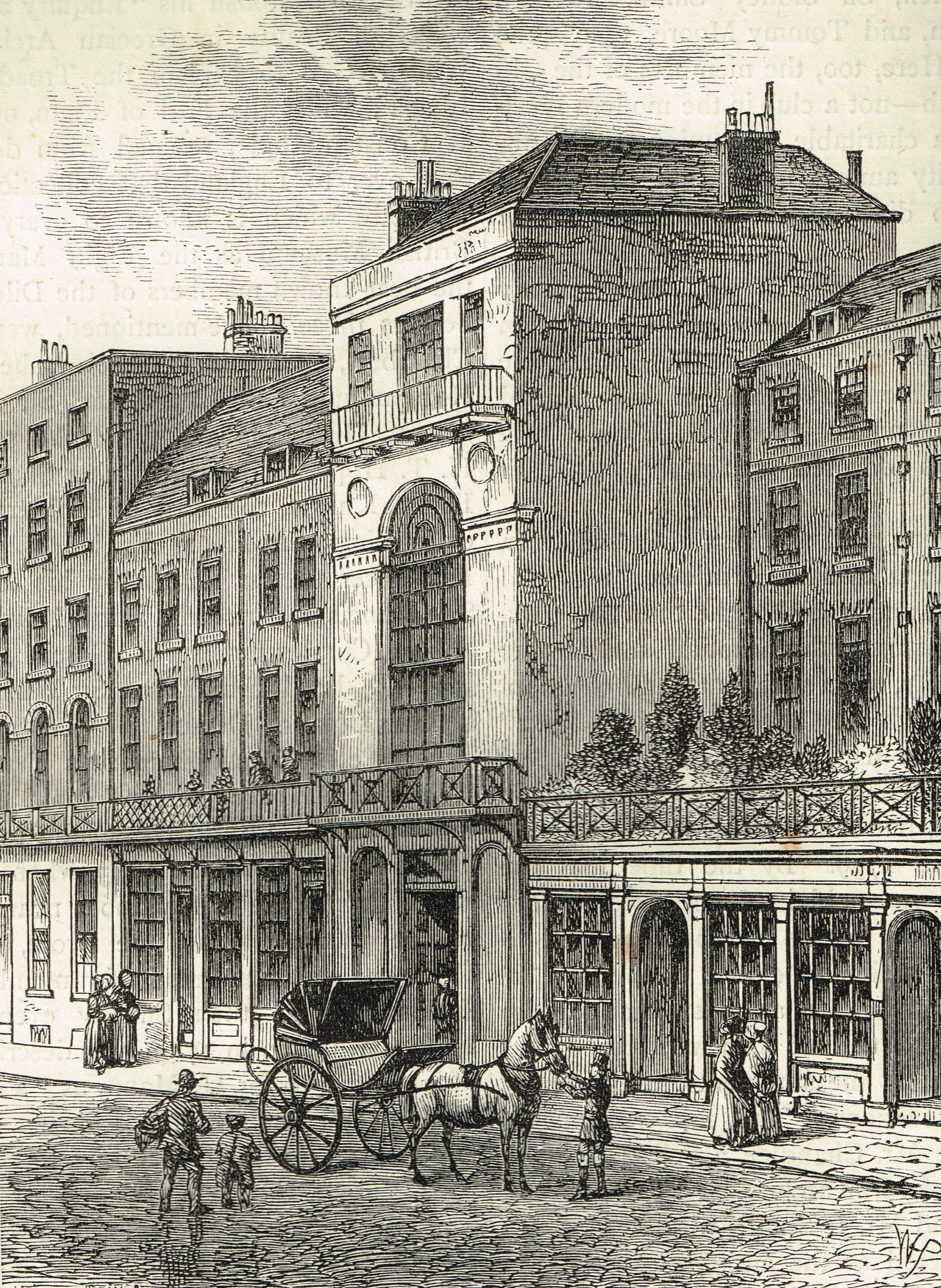
Depiction of the Thatched House Tavern

The Thatched House Tavern was an inn in the St James's district of London, England. It was located in St James's Street. It stood between 1711 and 1843, when it was demolished and the site used for the new Conservative Club, with the inn relocated to an adjacent building where it lasted until 1865 when that was also pulled down. It was a notable venue for political gatherings in the eighteenth century, and was also used as a meeting place by the Society of Dilettanti.

== Bibliography ==
- Newman, Ian. The Romantic Tavern. Cambridge University Press, 2019.
- Wheatley, Henry Benjamin. London, Past and Present: Its History, Associations, and Traditions, Volume 3. John Murray, 1893.
