= Royal Automobile Club =

British private social and athletic club

Coordinates: 51.5062°N 0.1349°W

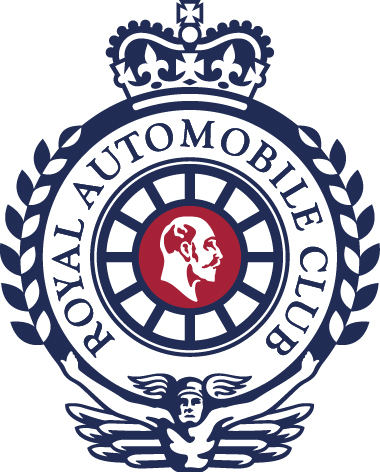
- King Edward VII at the centre of a wreathed wheel, supported by a winged Mercury
- Formation: 10 August 1897; 129 years ago
- Type: Social and athletic club
- Locations: 89 Pall Mall, London; Woodcote Park, Surrey
- Chairman: Duncan Wiltshire
- President: Prince Michael of Kent
- Website: royalautomobileclub.co.uk
- Formerly called: Automobile Club of Great Britain and Ireland

The Royal Automobile Club is a British private social and athletic club. It has two clubhouses: one in London at 89 Pall Mall, and the other in the countryside at Woodcote Park, near Epsom in Surrey. Both provide accommodation and a range of dining and sporting facilities.

It is best-known for establishing the roadside assistance service RAC Limited, though this is no longer owned by the club.

== History ==
At its centre, Walter Hancock's steam omnibus of 1830, Infant, asserts the British ancestry of the automobile

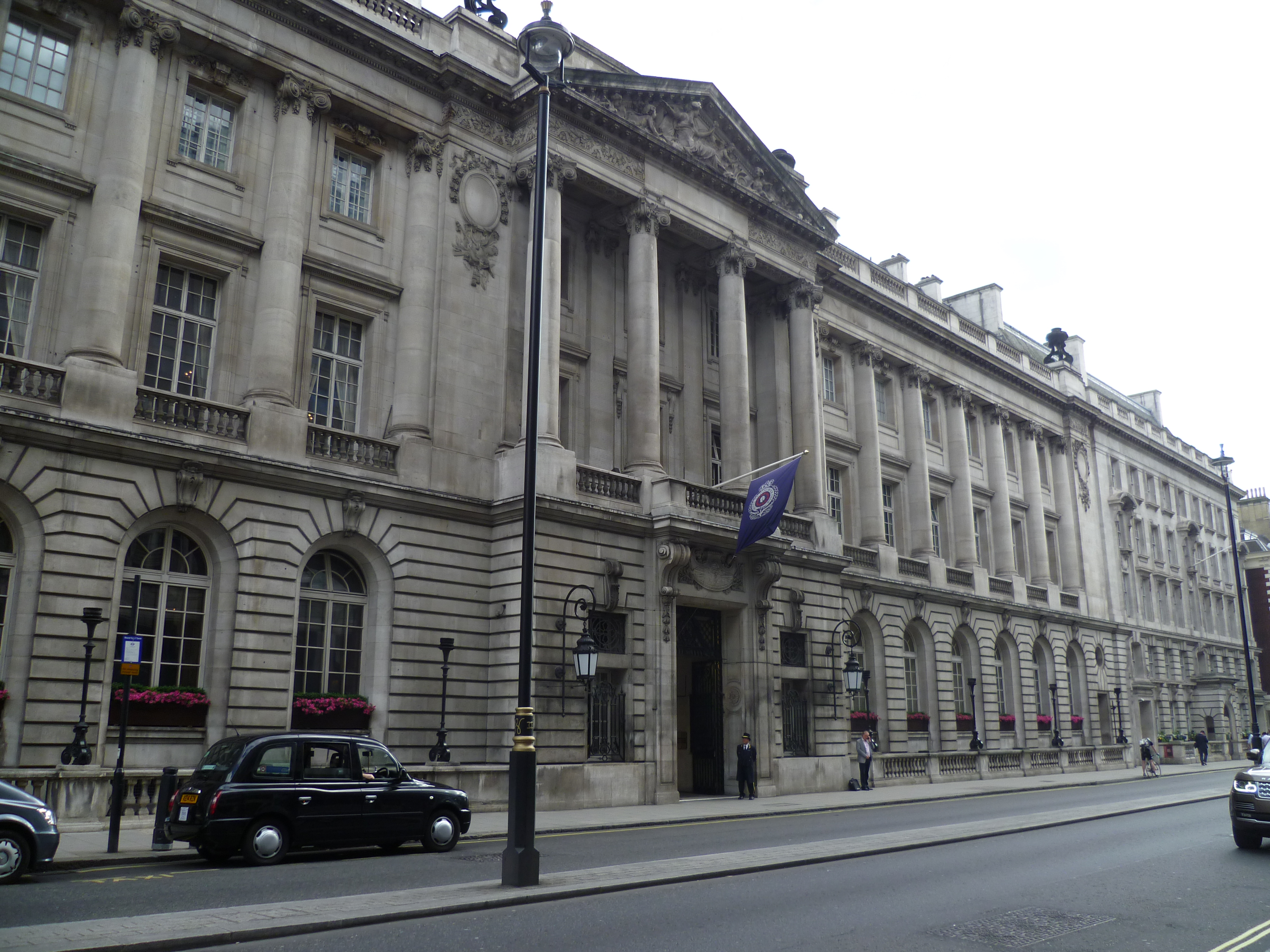
Clubhouse at 89 Pall Mall, London

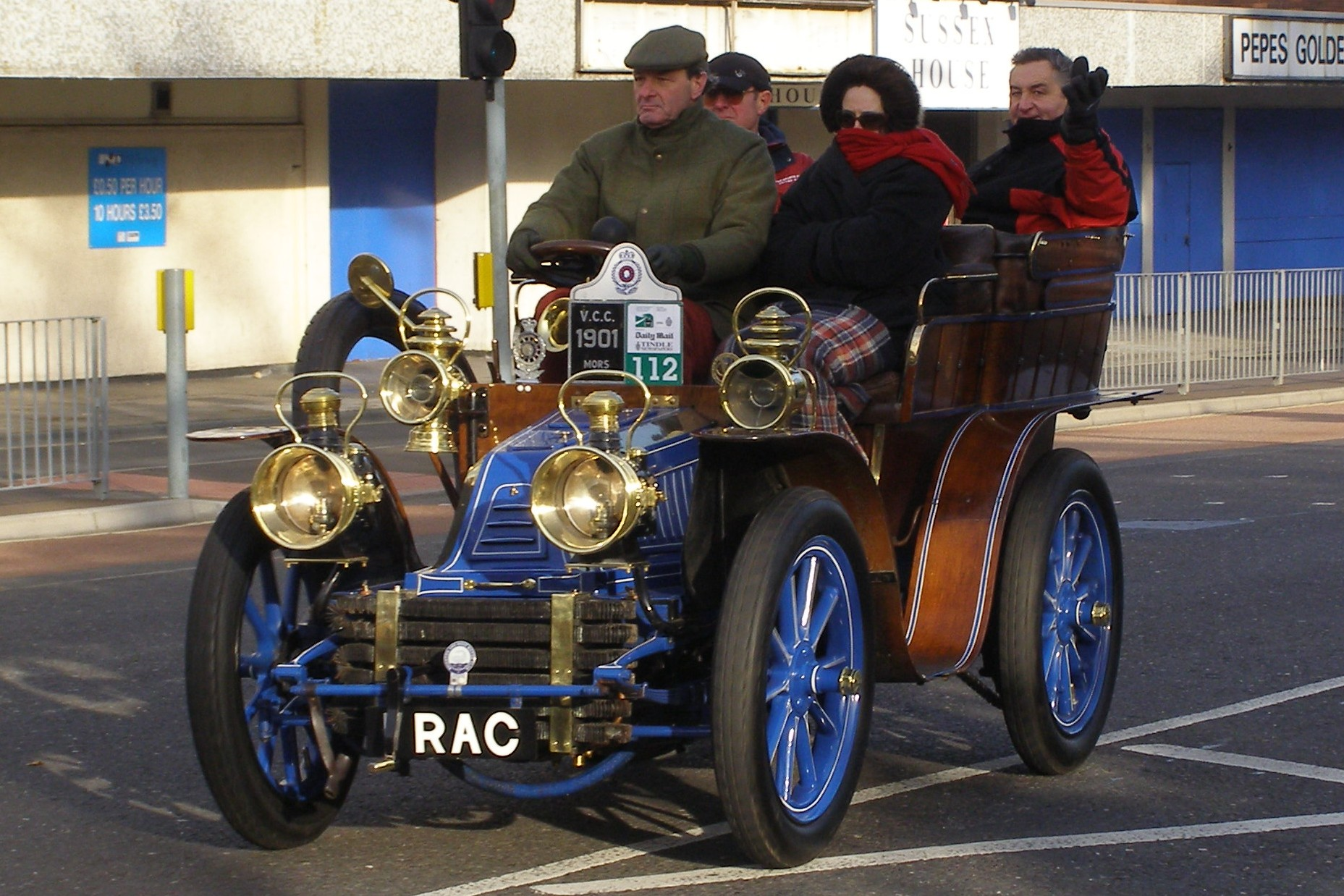
1901 Mors 10 H.P. rear-entrance tonneau owned by the RAC is a regular contender at the London to Brighton veteran car run; here at Crawley in 2006.

It was founded on 10 August 1897, with the name Automobile Club of Great Britain (which was later changed to Automobile Club of Great Britain and Ireland). The headquarters was originally in a block of flats at 4 Whitehall Court, before moving to 119 Piccadilly in 1902.

In 1902, the organisation, together with the recently formed Association of Motor Manufactures and Traders, campaigned vigorously for the relaxation of speed limits, claiming that the 14 mph speed limit imposed by the Locomotives on Highways Act 1896 was 'absurd' and was seldom observed. The organisations, with support from the Prime Minister Arthur Balfour, had considerable influence over the forthcoming Motor Car Act 1903, which originally proposed to remove all speed limits for cars while introducing the offence of driving recklessly. In the face of considerable opposition a speed limit of 20 mph was retained in addition to the creation of the offence of driving recklessly, dangerously or negligently.

In 1905, the club organised the first Tourist Trophy (TT) motorcycle race, the oldest regularly run motor race. The club became the governing body for motor sport in Britain. King Edward VII's interest in motoring led to the command in 1907 "that the Automobile Club of Great Britain and Ireland should henceforth be known as The Royal Automobile Club". In 1911, they moved to the current address, part of the site of the old War Office; the club house was (and remains) one of the largest in London, with a frontage to Pall Mall of 228 feet and a depth, in the centre, of 140 feet. It cost over a quarter of a million pounds and is described in the Survey of London as "a polished essay in the late French Renaissance manner." The clubhouse was designed by Mewès & Davis with E. Keynes Purchase, the honorary architect of the club.

At the outbreak of the First World War in August 1914, the club arranged for 25 of their members, with their personal cars, to accompany the British Expeditionary Force to France and Belgium to act as chauffeurs and messengers for the British General Staff. Describing themselves as the "RAC Corps of Volunteer Motor Drivers", the drivers included the Duke of Westminster, Lord Dalmeny and "Toby" Rawlinson; many of them were given commissions and went on to give distinguished war service. In September 1914, a further group of RAC members put themselves and their cars at the disposal of the British Red Cross, to help transport war casualties.

The RAC was responsible for organising the first British Grand Prix motor race at Brooklands, Surrey in 1926. In 1977, the RAC created the motorsport governance and events organisation, the Motor Sports Association (now Motorsport UK).

In 1978 during a re-organisation the 'Associate Section' was established as a separate company RAC Motoring Services Ltd, which was owned by the organisation.

In 1991 the RAC Foundation was split off as the research arm of 'RAC Motoring Services'. When RAC Motoring Services was sold in 1999 the foundation was granted a legacy and was subsequently established as a charity to research and promote issues of safety, mobility, economics and the environment related to motoring.

In September 1999 members sold RAC Motoring Services to Lex Service plc, who renamed themselves RAC plc in 2002. RAC plc was then acquired by Aviva plc in March 2005 for around £1.1 billion.

== Facilities ==
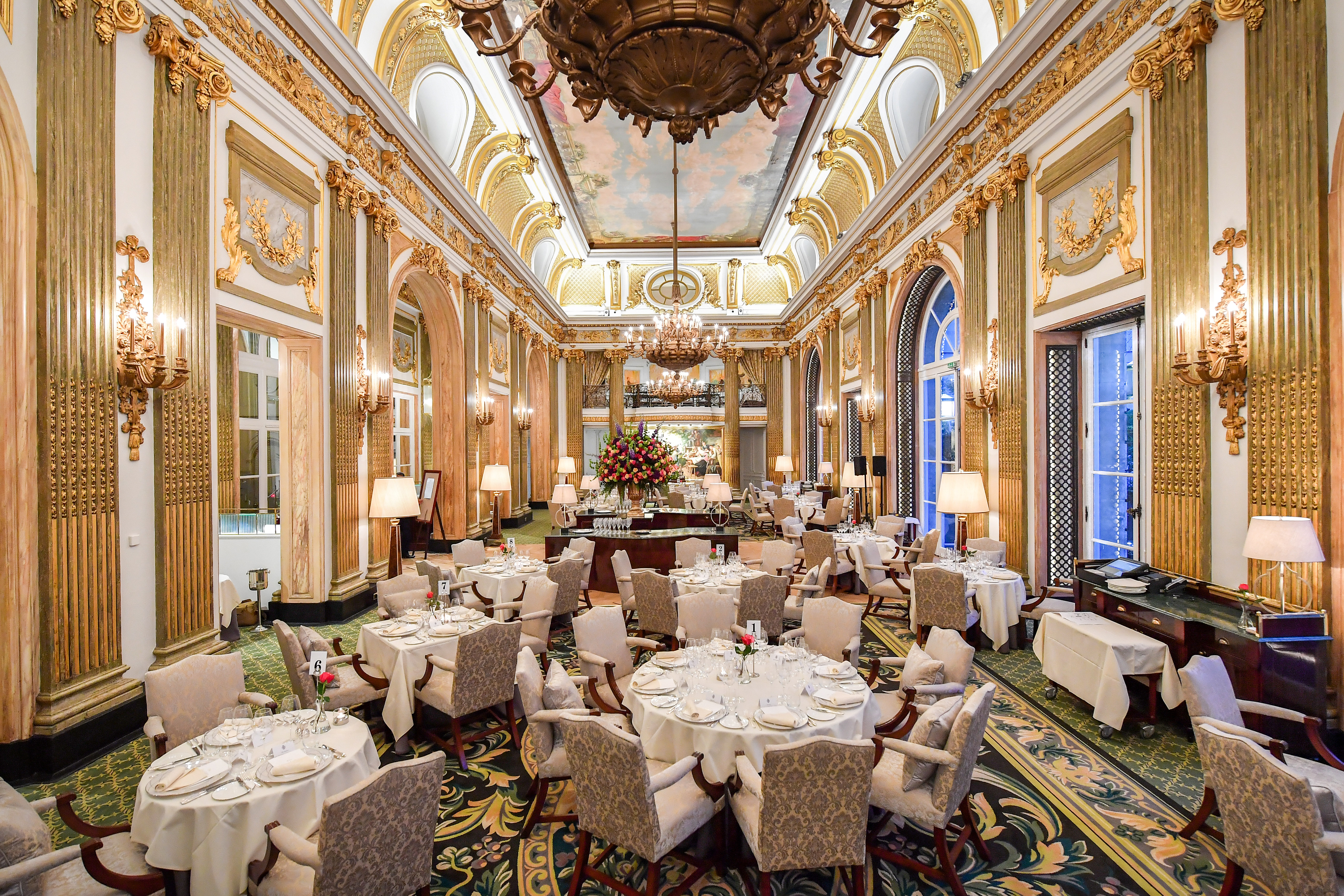
The Great Gallery restaurant at the Pall Mall clubhouse

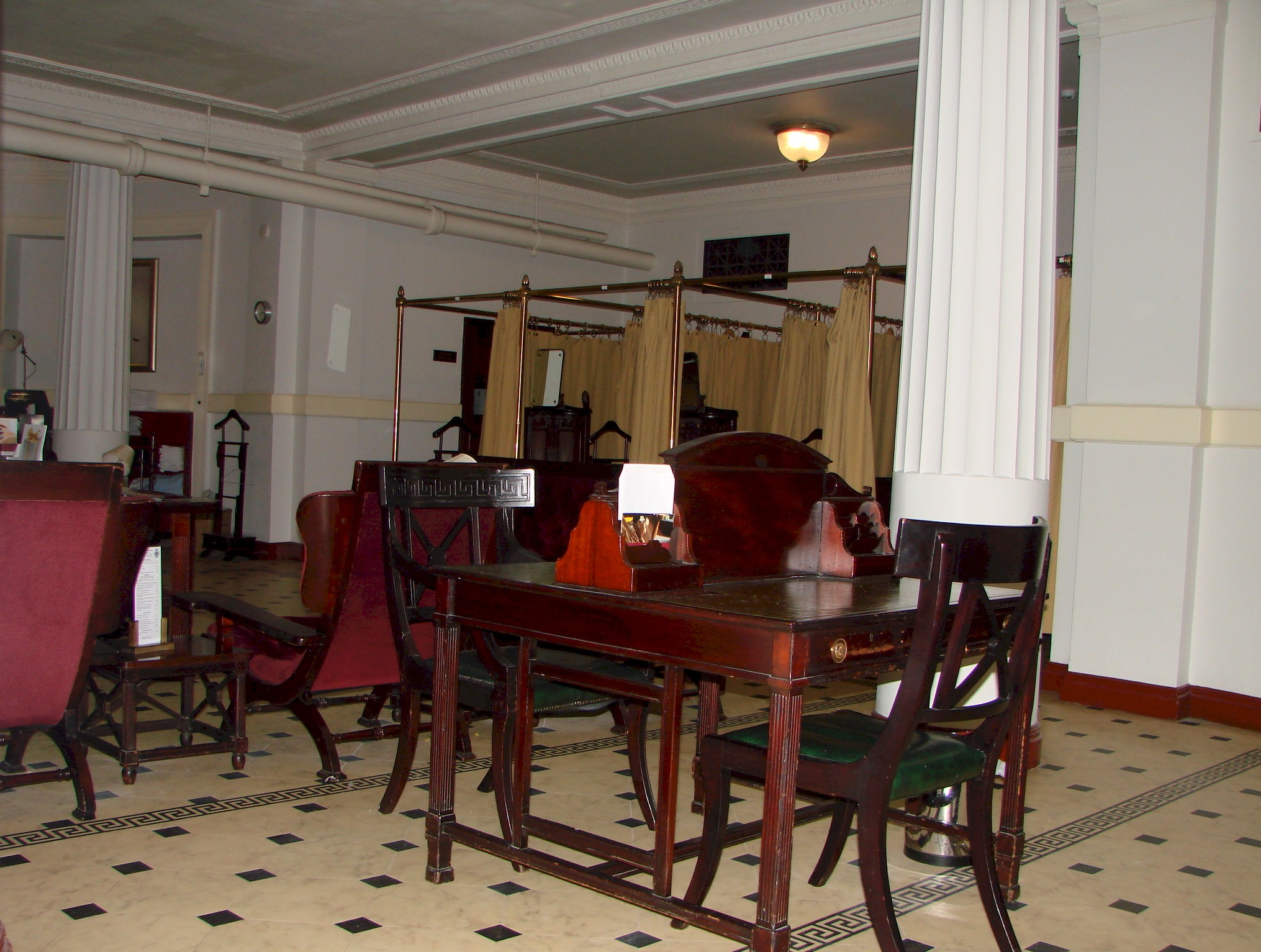
A corner of the large cooling-room in the club's Victorian-style Turkish baths before the 2004 refurbishment.

The Club's London premises have 108 bedrooms, seven banqueting rooms, three restaurants, a business centre, a full-size Art Deco style marble swimming pool, squash courts, a billiards room and a historic Victorian-style Turkish baths, one of only eleven still open in the UK.

The country clubhouse at Woodcote Park, near Epsom, also has accommodation, restaurants, and sports facilities including two 18-hole golf courses.

== Associate section (RAC Motoring Services) ==
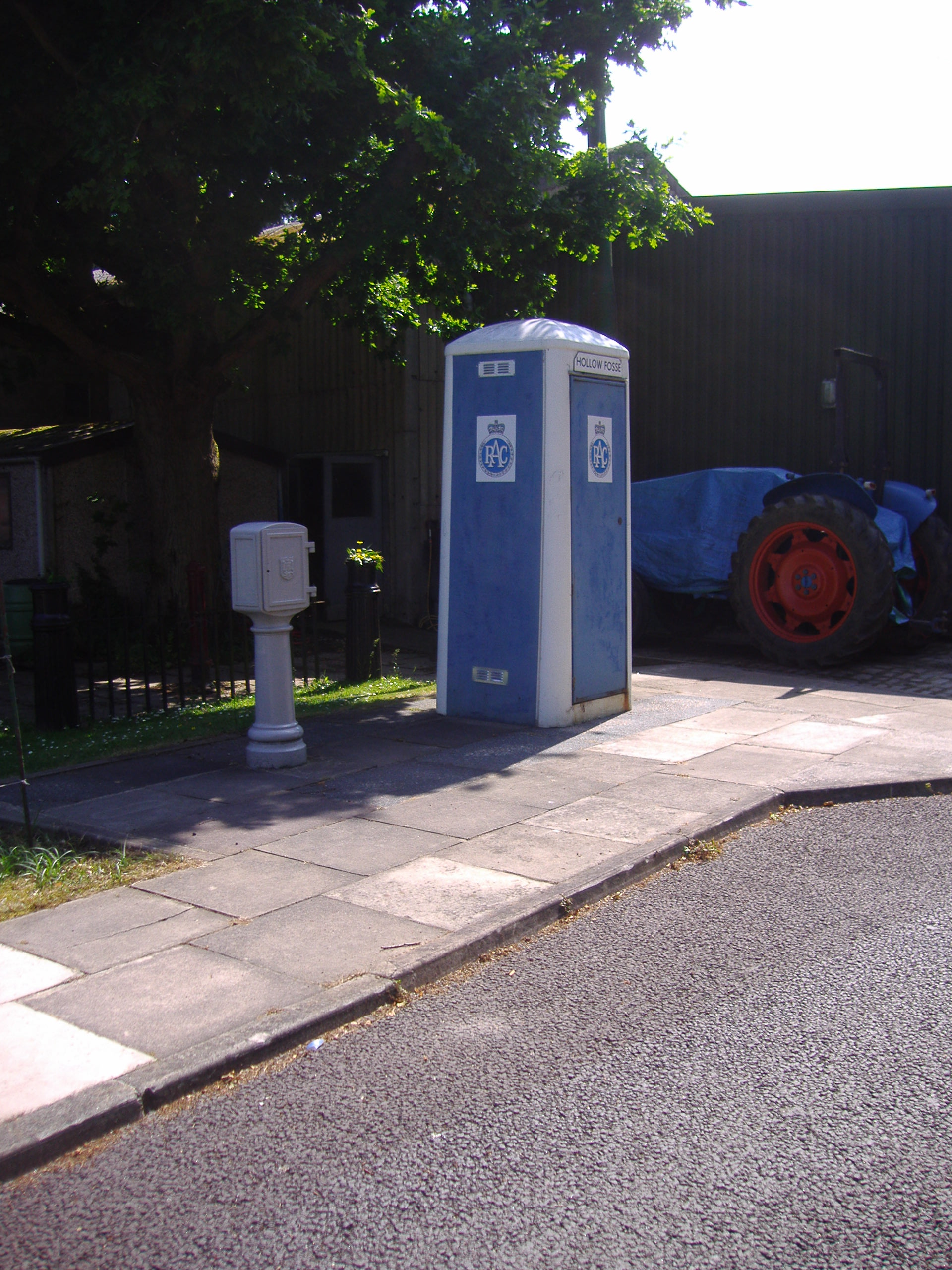
RAC roadside telephone box

The RAC introduced uniformed mobile patrols around the roads of Britain during 1901 with the patrolmen wearing a uniform not unlike the military police of the day, including tailored jodhpur trousers. The patrolmen had an army-like rank structure with corporals, sergeants and officers. Mounted on Matchless motorbikes with sidecars containing a tool kit, fanbelts, engine hoses, and metal cans of spare petrol they were usually located on standby at laybys and major road junctions. Until around 1930 control could only contact the mobile patrolmen by telephone, so they waited by public telephone boxes for the callout. From 1957 onwards they were equipped with radio sets for two way contact with their local headquarters.

In 1912, following the lead of the competitor organisation The Automobile Association (AA), the RAC installed roadside telephones on laybys and junctions of the main trunk roads in the UK for members to summon help. Although they were never as numerous as AA boxes there was a measure of cooperation between the two motoring clubs—keys fitted both types of box and members' messages were passed on. The telephones were installed in locked boxes painted in royal blue with the RAC logo badge mounted on the top of the box. Members were provided with a key to the boxes when they joined the club.

Members' cars were identified by a metal club badge usually affixed to the radiator grille and the patrolmen would come to attention and salute as a member drove past, or, if the patrolman was riding a motorcycle, merely salute.

The RAC issued an annual 'Guide and Handbook' that contained road maps of the UK with the location of all RAC telephones marked on it, together with lists of local RAC approved garages and hotels. To give members an indication of the quality of each establishment the RAC was one of the first organisations to provide an easily recognisable grading system. Their inspectors assessed each hotel and garage and awarded between one and five stars in the case of hotels and one to three spanners to garages. The RAC disbanded its hotel inspection team in 2004.

Motorcycle patrols gave way to small vans during the 1960s and by 1970 the last motorcycle patrols had been phased out. RAC telephone boxes were withdrawn from service when they were eclipsed by wider telephone ownership and by the 1990s only a handful still operated on holiday routes in the West Country. The advent of mobile phones made the need for roadside telephones redundant and the last of the RAC telephones were removed from service. Roadside assistance is now provided by vans and recovery vehicles.

Until the early 1970s the RAC did not have a formal "onward to destination" service for members. If the patrolman was not able to complete the repair at the roadside, arrangements were made for an RAC approved garage to tow the vehicle and repair it at the owner's cost, with the owners being responsible for making their own arrangements for travel by public transport or hired vehicle. This changed in the 1970s with the first of the low-loading vehicle transporter fleet and the introduction of a higher membership tier of the Recovery service. Similarly, until the early 1980s the roadside assistance service was limited to locations away from home, which only changed with the addition of an At Home level of service.

In 1978 the Associate section was split off to form RAC Motoring Services Ltd and subsequently sold in 1999 to Lex Service (then renamed RAC plc).

== Chairmen of the Royal Automobile Club ==
The governing body of the club is its board of directors, which is presided over by the chairman.

- 1897–1904, Roger William Wallace (first chairman)
- 1904–1905, Capel Lofft Holden
- 1905–1907, Sir Arthur Stanley
- 1907–1908, Sir Charles Rose, 1st Baronet
- 1908–1910, Prince Francis of Teck
- 1910–1912, Adolphus Cambridge, 1st Marquess of Cambridge
- 1912–1936, Sir Arthur Stanley, MP
- 1936–1945, Lt-Colonel James Sealy Clarke
- 1945–1972, Wilfred Andrews
- 1972–1975, Andrew Polson
- 1975–1978, Sir Clive Bossom
- 1978–1981, Sir Carl Aarvold
- 1981–1998, Jeffrey Rose CBE
- 2007–2012, Sir David Prosser
- 2012–2018, Thomas Purves
- 2018–2024, Benjamin Cussons
- 2024–Present, Duncan Wiltshire

== Presidents of the Royal Automobile Club ==
- 1904–1911, George Sutherland-Leveson-Gower, 3rd Duke of Sutherland (first president)
- 1911–1942, Prince Arthur, Duke of Connaught
- 1942–1943, Prince George, Duke of Kent
- 1943–1979, Louis Mountbatten, 1st Earl Mountbatten of Burma
- 1979–present, Prince Michael of Kent

== Clubhouse plans ==
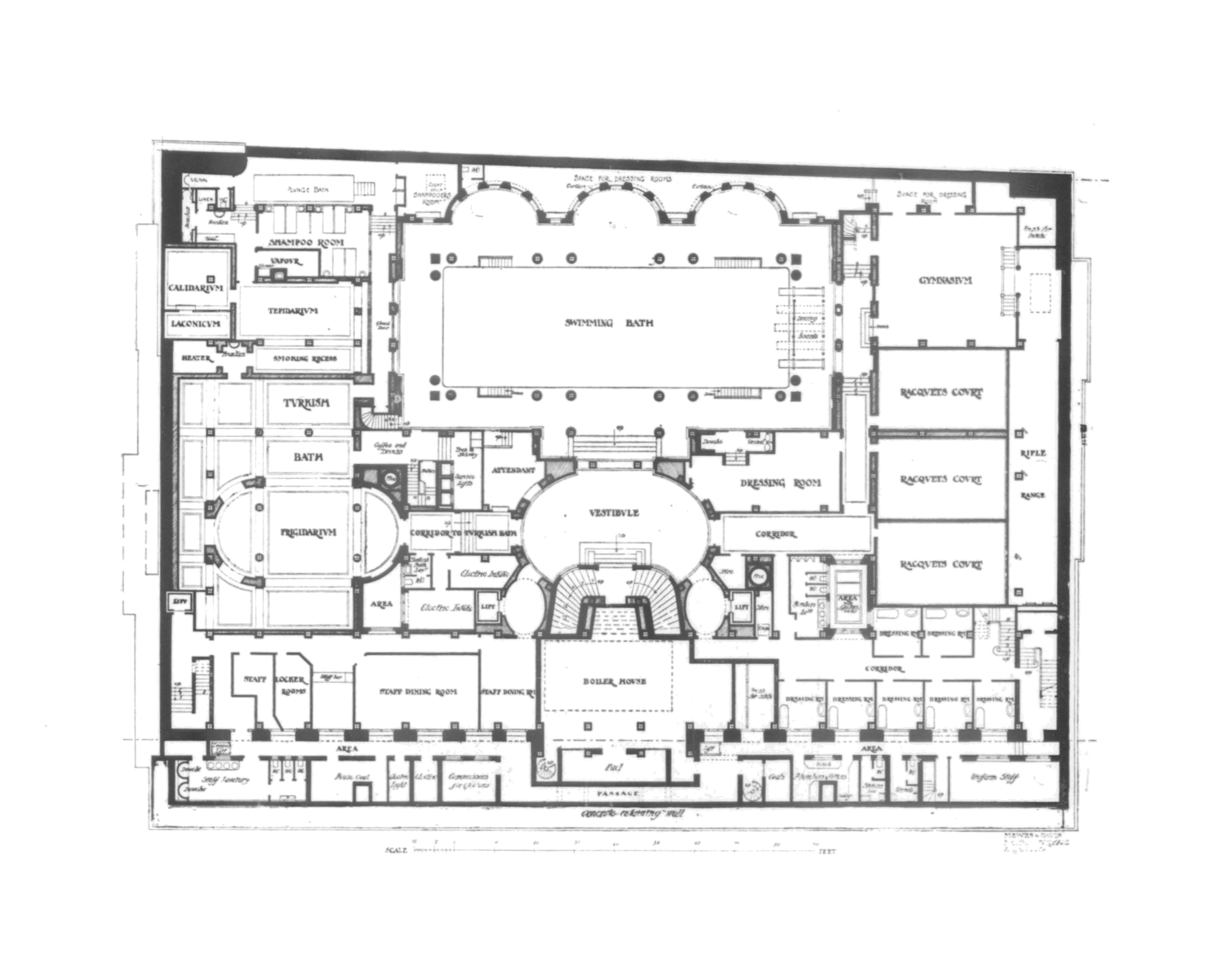
Basement

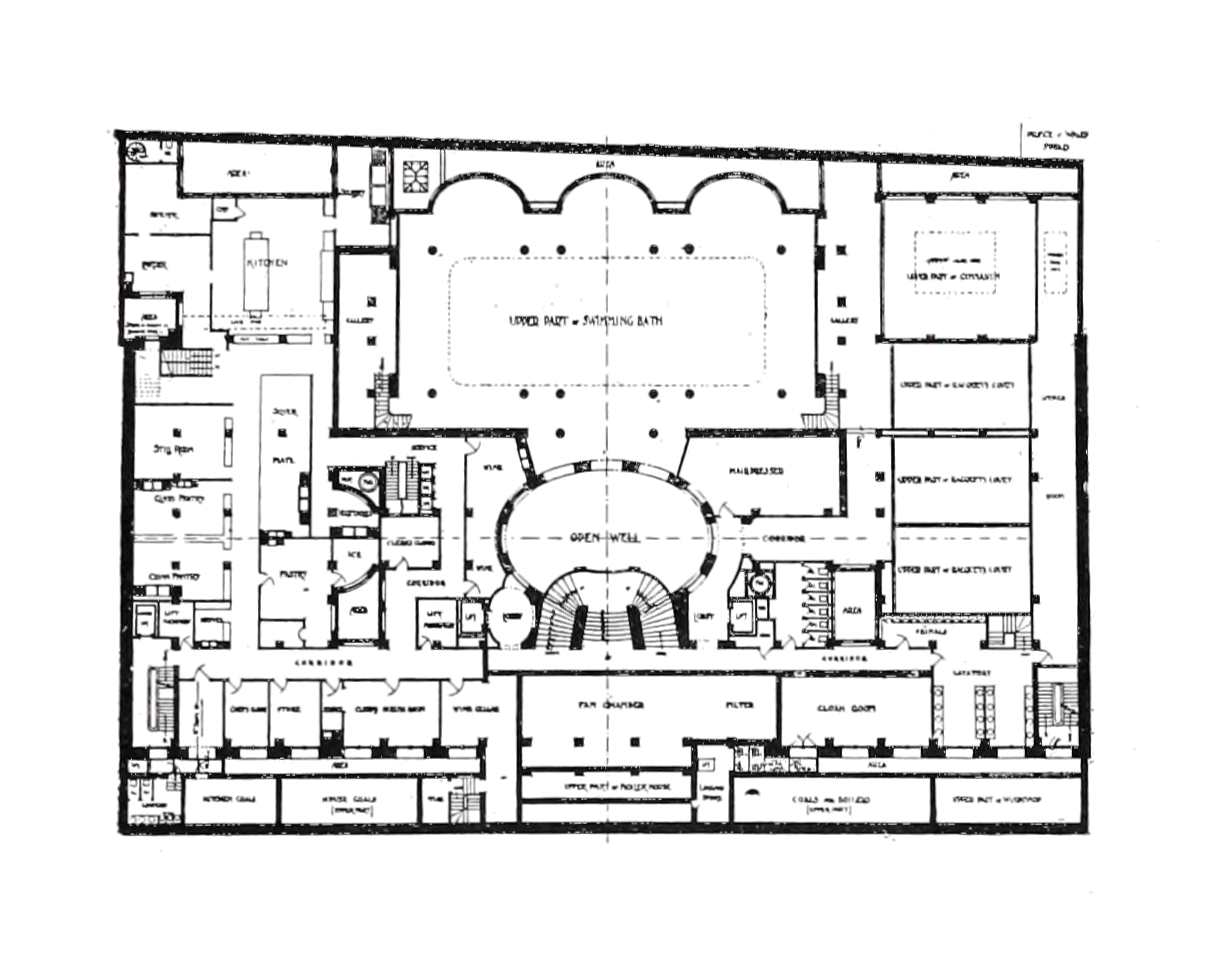
Lower ground floor

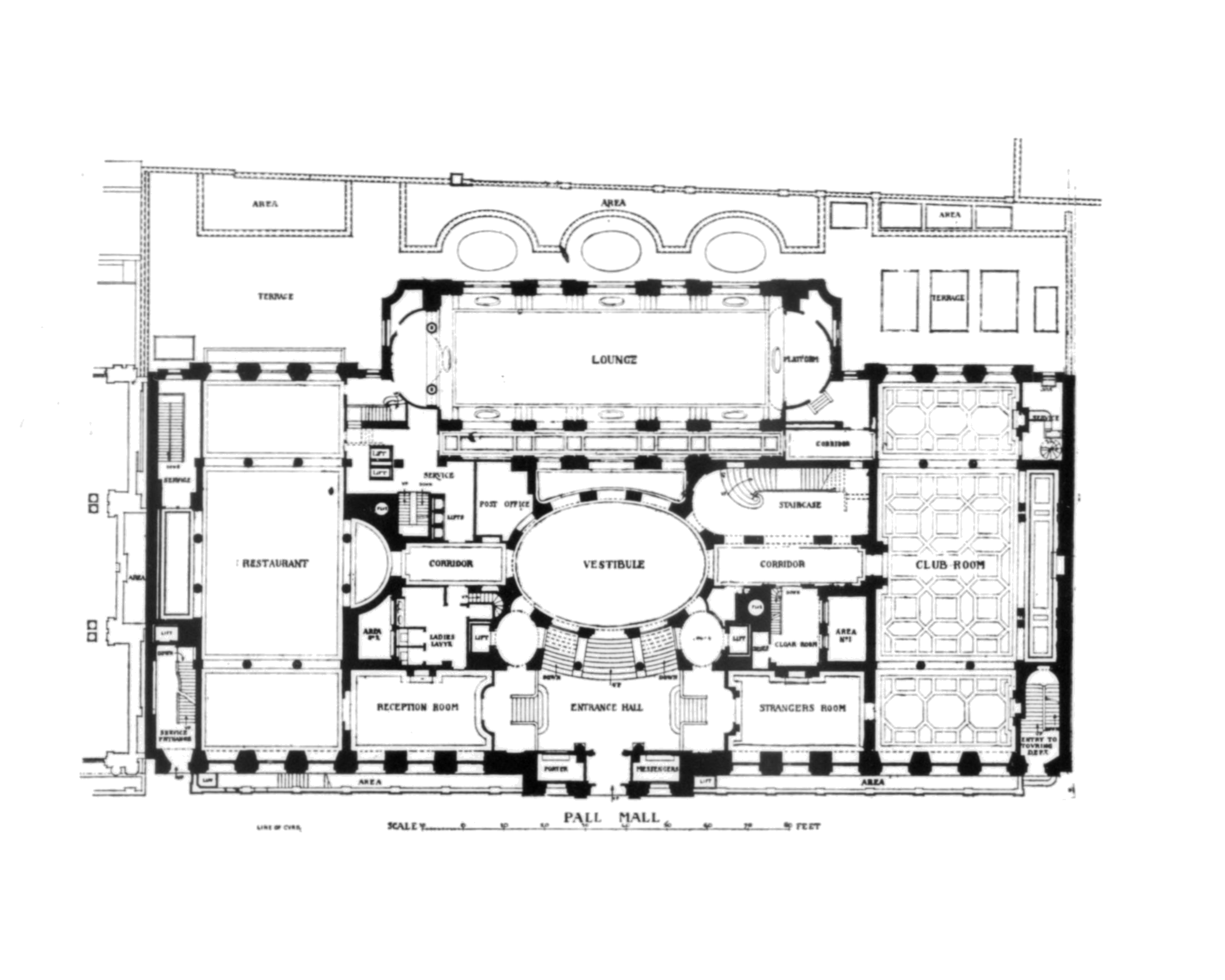
Ground floor

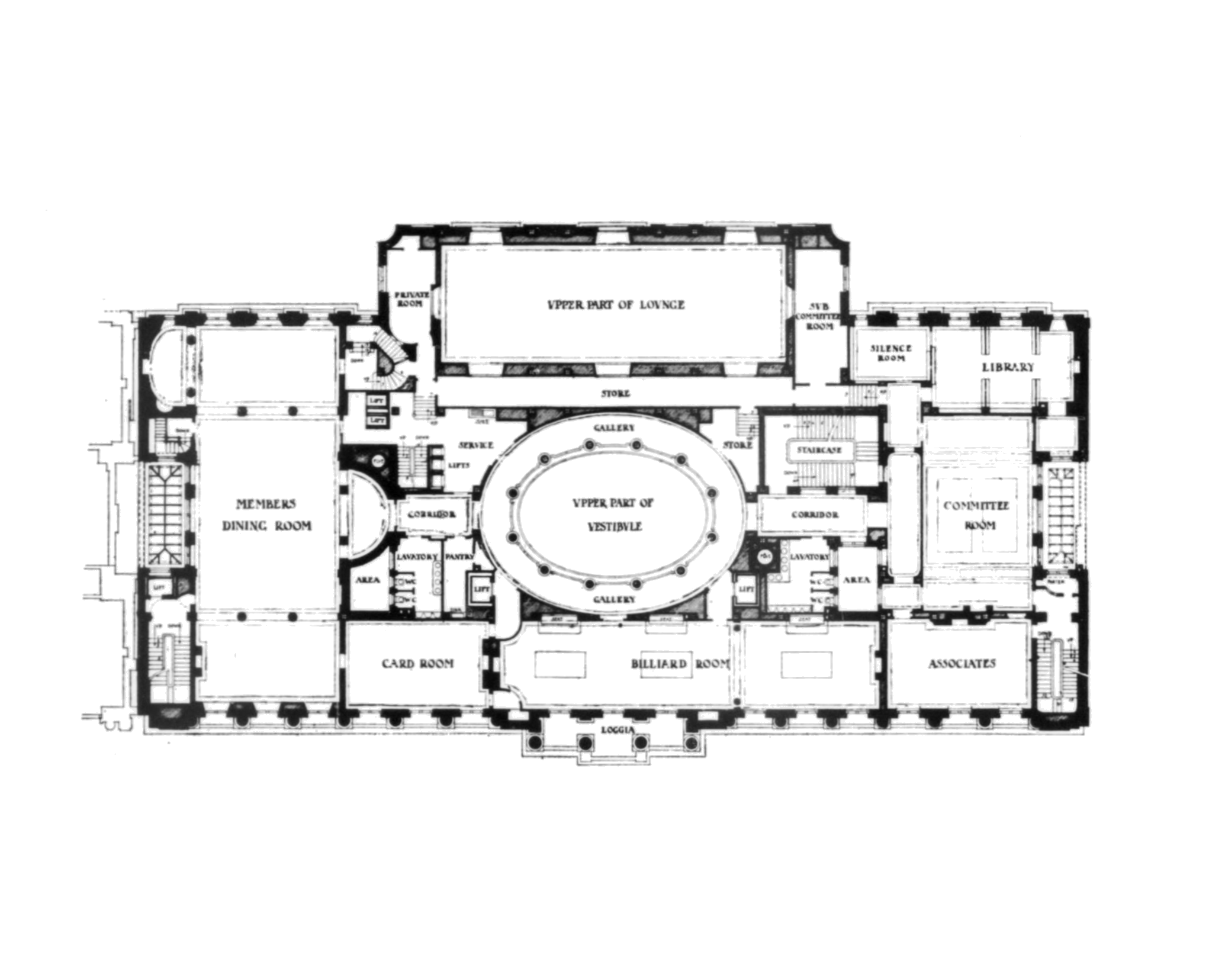
First floor

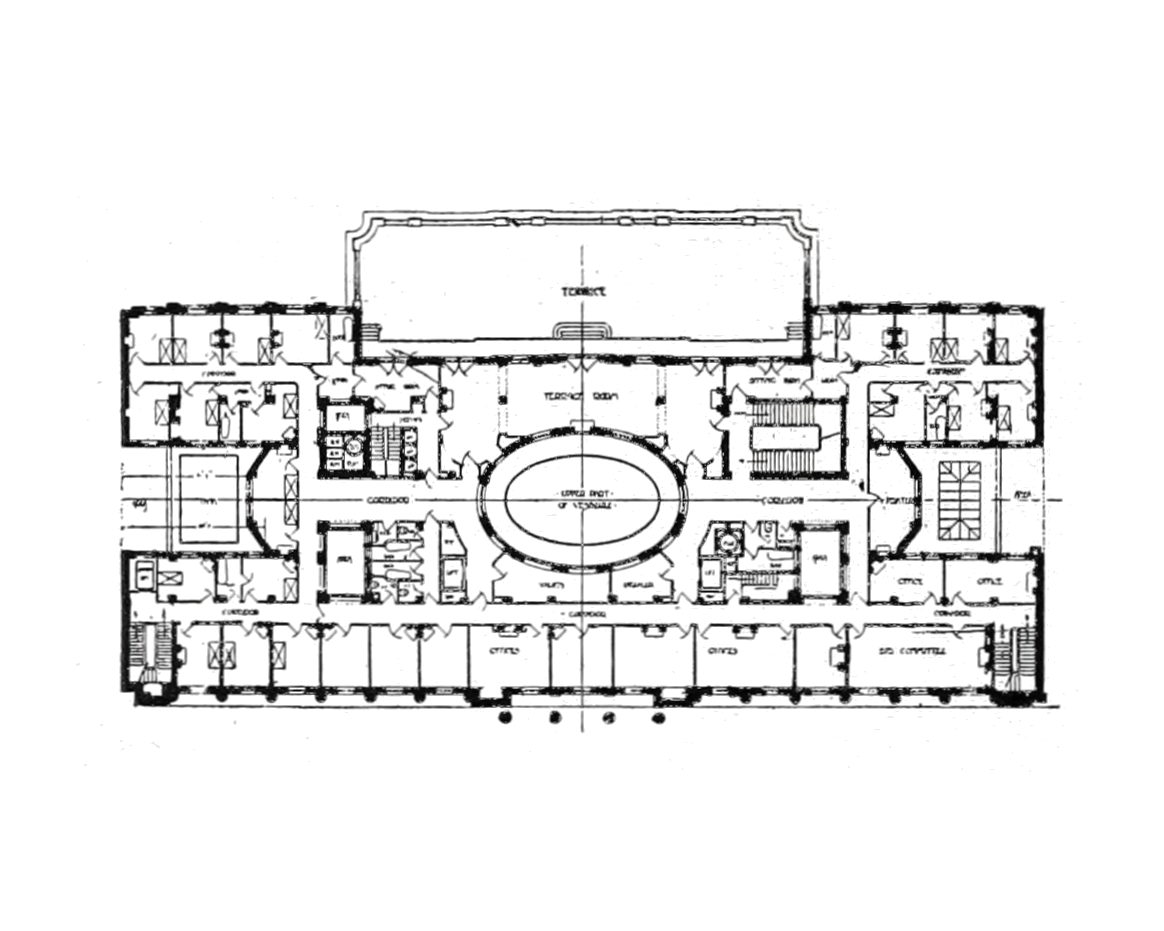
Second floor

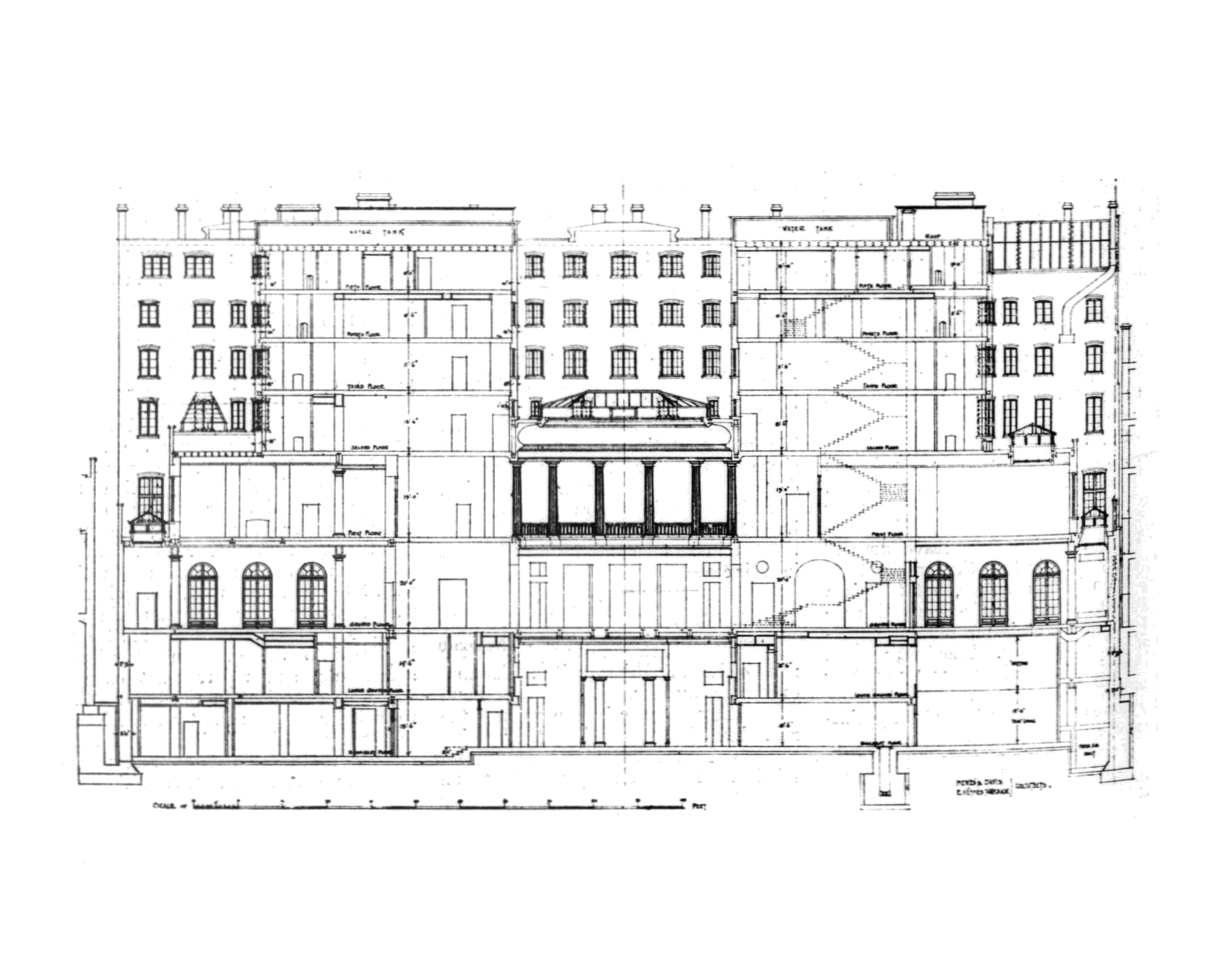
Longitudinal section

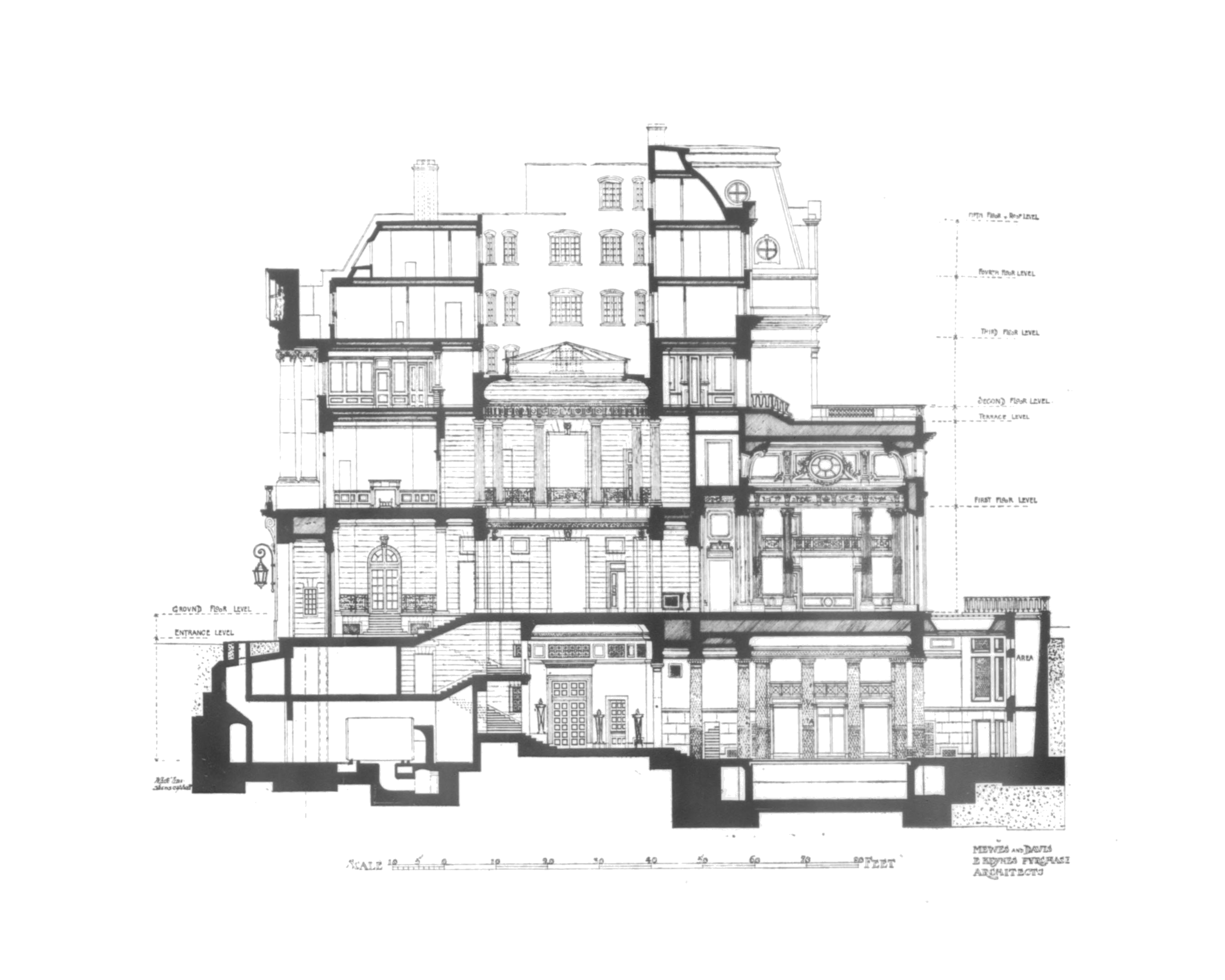
Cross section

== See also ==
- List of London's gentlemen's clubs
- RAC Limited
- Royal Yacht Squadron
- Royal Air Squadron
- Genevieve, a 1953 film about the club vintage car rally
