= F. D. Amr Bey =

Egyptian diplomat and squash player

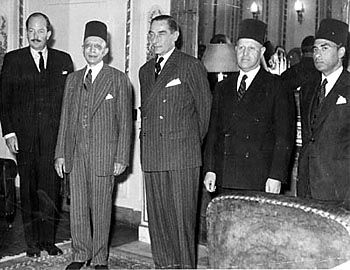
The 1952 Anglo-Egyptian negotiations. Ambassador Amr is on the far right, wearing a tarboosh.

Abdelfattah Amr (Arabic: عبد الفتاح عمرو) (14 February 1909 – 23 November 1988), better known as "F.D. Amr Bey" or simply "Amr Bey", was an Egyptian diplomat and squash player. He won the British Open men's title six consecutive times (1933–1938), and is considered the first truly dominant squash player in the sport.

== Name ==
Amr's full legal name in Arabic is Abdelfattah Amr. "Bey" is not a name but a nobiliary title, similar to the British title of "sir". On 20 November 1943, Amr was given the higher-ranking title of "pasha", one of the most important in monarchical Egypt. The title of "Pasha" supersedes that of "Bey", which is why Amr is sometimes referred to by the pseudonym Amr Pasha.

== Squash career ==
Abdelfattah Amr
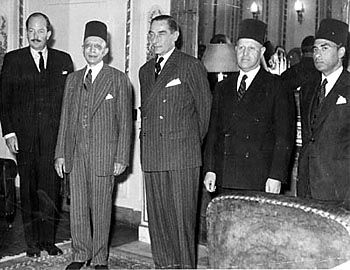

Personal information
- Nickname: F.D. Amr Bey
- Born: 14 February 1909
- Died: 23 November 1988 (aged 79)
- Height: 5 ft 5 in (1.65 m)

Sport
- Country: Egypt
- Handedness: Right Handed
- Turned pro: Never (amateur)
- Retired: 1938

British Open
- Title: Champion (1933–1938)
Medal record
British Open Championships
Gold medal – first place	1932/33	singles
Gold medal – first place	1933/34	singles
Gold medal – first place	1934/35	singles
Gold medal – first place	1935/36	singles
Gold medal – first place	1936/37	singles
Gold medal – first place	1937/38	singles
British Amateur Championships
Gold medal – first place	1931/1932	singles
Gold medal – first place	1932/1933	singles
Gold medal – first place	1933/1934	singles
Gold medal – first place	1935/1936	singles
Gold medal – first place	1936/1937	singles
Gold medal – first place	1937/1938	singles

Amr was born into a prominent family from Abu Tij in Asyut Governorate, which is situated in Upper Egypt. He moved to England in 1928 as an Egyptian diplomat. He had never played squash before, his main sports at the time being tennis and polo. He represented Egypt in tennis at the Davis Cup. Amr was introduced to squash while in the United Kingdom, and took to the game quickly.

The British Open men's title was only recently inaugurated at the time Amr emerged on the scene, but it quickly became the most significant title in the game and came to be viewed by many to be the equivalent to a world championship for the sport. The men's final at the time was played under a "challenge" system, with a challenger taking on the defending champion in a best-of-three-legs match-up, with matches being played at both the two players' respective squash clubs. In 1933, Amr took on Don Butcher, who had won the title in 1931 and 1932. The first match of the tie was played at Butcher's club, the Conservative Club, with Amr winning 9–0, 9–7, 9–1. The second leg was played at Amr's club, the Bath Club, which Amr won 9–5, 6–9, 9–2, 9–1 to capture the title.

No challenger emerged to take on Amr in the British Open final in 1934, so he retained the title by default. Butcher challenged Amr in the 1935 final, with Amr again winning in two matches – 9–4, 8–10, 10–8, 9–0 and 9–6, 6–9, 9–2, 0–9, 9–5.

In 1936–1938, Amr faced Jim Dear in three consecutive British Open finals, with Amr winning on all three occasions in two straight matches.

In addition to his six British Open titles, Amr won the British Amateur Championship six times (in 1931–1933 and 1935–1937), an exploit which is recognized by the Guinness Book of Records. Along with Jonah Barrington, Amr is the only player to win both the British Open and British Amateur titles in the same year, a feat he accomplished five times.

Several commentators have credited Amr as one of the leading players in the history of squash.

=== British Open ===
Amr won the British Open Men's Championships six consecutive times.

Year	Location	Opponent in Final	Score in Final
1933	Conservative Club (first tie); Bath Club (return)	Don Butcher	9–0 9–7 9–1 and 9–5 6–9 9–2 9–1 9
1934	Amr did not receive a challenge. The Championship was played on a challenge system until 1946. No third ties were necessary as all results ended 2–0.		
1935	Conservative Club (first tie); Bath Club (return)	Don Butcher	9–4 8–10 10–8 9–0 and 9–6 6–9 9–2 0–9 9–5
1936	Bath Club (first tie); Royal Automobile Club (return)	Jim Dear	9–3 6–9 8–10 9–2 9–4 and 9–4 9–7 3–9 9–7
1937	Royal Automobile Club (first tie); Bath Club (return)	Jim Dear	9–7 7–9 9–7 5–9 9–6 and 9–7 8–10 9–1 9–6
1938	Royal Automobile Club (first tie); Bath Club (return)	Jim Dear	10–8 10–8 4–9 1–9 9–4 and 9–7 8–10 9–6 9–5

== Diplomatic career ==
Abdelfattah Amr Pasha

3rd Egypt Ambassador to the United Kingdom
- In office 24 July 1945 – 30 October 1952
- Monarch: Farouk I
- Preceded by: Hassan Pasha Nashaat
- Succeeded by: Mahmoud Fawzi

Personal details
- Born: 14 February 1909
- Died: 23 November 1988 (aged 79)
- Other political affiliations: Pro-British
- Occupation: Squash player
- Profession: Diplomat

Amr retired from squash in 1938 while still the top player in the game in order to focus on his career as a diplomat. He served as Egypt's ambassador to the United Kingdom from 1945 to 1952. At the time, King Farouk of Egypt was eager to improve Egypt's relations with the United Kingdom. Since Amr was known to be on good terms with the British authorities, the king appointed him on 11 November 1944 as minister plenipotentiary at the Egyptian Embassy in London, where Amr had previously held the post of honorary counselor. Amr replaced Hassan Pasha Nashaat, who was removed from his position after marrying a non-Egyptian. Amr was promoted to the rank of ambassador in August 1945, and always tried to influence King Farouk's decisions in favour of British interests. This led the famed intellectual Taha Hussein to state that Amr was "more suited to be Britain's ambassador in Egypt than Egypt's ambassador in Britain."

During his ambassadorship, Amr did not forget his sporting roots: along with the rest of the expatriate Egyptian community in the United Kingdom, he received with great enthusiasm Egypt's Olympic delegation to the 1948 London Olympics, which won five medals and was one of the most successful in Egypt's Olympic history. Amr was also involved in the inauguration of the Islamic Cultural Centre in London, also known as the London Central Mosque. In 1940, the British government had allocated £100,000 for the acquisition of a mosque site in London by Britain's Muslim community, in exchange for the allocation by the Egyptian Government of a piece of land in Cairo for the construction of an Anglican church. The Islamic Cultural Centre was opened in November 1944 by King George VI. Since Egypt was at the forefront of efforts to establish the centre, Amr was chosen as the first director of its board. The centre went on to become the largest and most important Islamic institution in Europe.

In 1951, Egypt's Wafdist government, led by Prime Minister Nahhas Pasha, decided to unilaterally abrogate the Anglo-Egyptian Treaty of 1936, a move which the United Kingdom deemed illegal and refused to recognize. As a result, confrontation erupted in the Suez Canal zone between Egypt's police and fedayeen on the one hand, and British military forces on the other hand. As a sign of protest, the Egyptian Council of Ministers decided to recall Amr from London on 11 December 1951. Amr was appointed on 25 December as the king's special advisor for foreign affairs, while keeping his original post of ambassador. After the outbreak of the devastating Cairo Fire of 26 January 1952—which remains unexplained to this day—, there were numerous conspiracy theories regarding the identity of the perpetrators. Some such as newspaper Al-Masri defended the idea that the fire was started by King Farouk, and accused Amr Pasha and the British Embassy of being part of the plot. According to this view, the appointment of Amr as the king's special advisor only a month prior to the fire's breakout, as well as the selection of Hafez Pasha Afifi, another pro-British official, as chief of the royal cabinet, were measures aimed at undermining the nationalist Wafd government. Supporters of this conspiracy theory allege that Amr and Afifi served as intermediaries between the King and the British in their joint planning of the fire.

The Cairo Fire resulted in the dismissal of Nahhas Pasha and the formation of a new short-lived government headed by Ali Maher Pasha. The new government decided to send an official Egyptian delegation to the funeral of King George VI as a reconciliatory measure towards the United Kingdom. Amr Pasha was dispatched to London in his capacity as ambassador, along with Prince Muhammad Abdel Moneim, in order to attend the funeral, which was held on 15 February 1952. Nevertheless, Amr did not present new letters of credence to the new British sovereign, Queen Elizabeth II. The Maher government had to address two major national issues: the departure (Arabic: الجلاء) of British military forces from the Suez Canal zone, and the unification (Arabic: الوحدة) of Egypt and Sudan, which had hitherto been jointly administered by Egypt and the United Kingdom as a condominium. As a result, Anglo-Egyptian talks about negotiations were conducted, in which Amr Pasha played a major role. As Egypt's ambassador to the United Kingdom, he shuttled between London and Cairo trying to convey the Egyptian position to British politicians, notably Foreign Minister Anthony Eden, and then advise Egyptian leaders on the response. After the fall of the Maher government and its replacement by that of El-Hilali Pasha, the first official negotiating meeting took place on 22 March 1952. Amr was part of the Egyptian negotiating team, which also included El-Hilali Pasha himself as well as Foreign Minister Abdel-Khaleq Hassouna Pasha. The British side refused to commit itself publicly to "the principle of evacuation" before the start of the negotiations. The day after the official start of the negotiations, the Egyptian Parliament was dismissed. New elections were scheduled for 18 May, and martial law was extended indefinitely. Amid the extreme political instability in Egypt at the time occurred a military coup on 23 July 1952. After King Farouk's abdication in favor of his infant son Fuad II, the new Regency Council forced Amr into retirement at the end of August of the same year, replacing him as ambassador in London by Mahmoud Fawzi.

== Later life ==
Amr spent the rest of his life in the United Kingdom, where he and his children obtained British citizenship. However, he also kept his Egyptian nationality. In 1972, he visited the Egyptian Consulate-General in London in order to renew his Egyptian passport, which had been expired for more than 15 years. Although he succeeded in obtaining a new passport, Amr requested to keep his expired royal passport as a souvenir, since it bore the inscription "Ambassador of the King of Egypt and the Sudan to the United Kingdom." The Ministry of Foreign Affairs in Cairo did not object to his request. According to Mustafa El-Fiki, a career diplomat who met Amr at the Consulate-General in London in 1972, the former squash player and ambassador told him that he did not hold a grudge against the leaders of the 1952 coup, even though they had sidelined him. Amr acknowledged during their encounter that several mistakes had been committed during the monarchical era, and expressed his enthusiasm for the reforms being implemented at the time by President Anwar El Sadat, who had ascended to the presidency two years earlier.

Amr died on 23 November 1988.

== Sporting legacy ==
Amr is widely regarded as the first truly dominant player in the sport of squash. Although he never became a professional athlete, he still managed to beat all the top professional players of his time, and has been called the first "professional amateur" in squash because his training for the game became the key focus of his life. In addition, Amr is considered part of the "golden age of sports in Egypt," a period spanning the 1940s and 1950s that witnessed numerous famed Egyptian sportsmen, notably swimmers and squash players. In fact, Amr himself was the "discoverer" of Mahmoud Karim, another Egyptian squash player who dominated the British Open in the postwar period. Karim recalled in a 1965 interview how he had been secretly practicing squash when he was young at the Gezira Sporting Club, where he worked as a ball boy. When Amr, a club member, once saw him using his racket without permission, he reprimanded him. After Karim stated he liked the game, Amr was eager to show him that "squash was only for blue bloods and rich people" and thus challenged him to play with him. Amr lost, which was his first ever defeat, thereby jumpstarting Karim's career.

On 28 November 2009, Amr was posthumously honoured with the World Squash Awards' Lifetime Achievement Award. Event organizer Peter Nicol, himself a former World No. 1, stated that Amr "is widely considered to have raised the level of the sport of squash to new heights through both his outstanding racket skills and his exceptional speed and fitness, hence his nickname the "Human Streak of Lightning"." Since the 2009 Awards were dominated by Egyptian players such as Karim Darwish (Player of the Year) and Mohamed El Shorbagy (Young Player of the Year), Nicol paid tribute to Amr by describing him as "the first building block that created the foundation for Egyptian squash that has been carried on and is no better illustrated than by the recipients of this evening's other awards." Amr's award was collected by James Sandwith, the squash chairman of the Royal Automobile Club, which was the site of several of Amr's victories.

Diplomatic posts
Preceded by Hassan Pasha Nashaat	Ambassador of Egypt to the United Kingdom; 1945–1952	Succeeded by Mahmoud Fawzi
