= Don Butcher =

English squash player

Donald Butcher was an English squash player, and the first player to win the British Open men's title in open play.

== Career ==
Butcher was a professional squash player based at the Conservative Club in London when he played in the first British Open final in December 1930. His opponent Charles Read, a former English professional champion, was designated open champion at the initiation of the event, which was a 'challenge' event without any preliminary rounds, with the final played under a best-of-three-legs format. Butcher defeated Read in the first match at the Queen's Club 9–6, 9–5, 9–5. He then won the second match at the Conservative Club 9–3, 9–5, 9–3 to claim the title and make the third match unnecessary.

In 1932, Butcher successfully defended his title against Charles Arnold, winning the first match at the Conservative Club 9–0, 9–0, 9–0, and the second match at the Bath Club 9–3, 9–0, 9–5.

Butcher was unsuccessful in his defence of the Championship in 1933 against Egyptian player F.D. Amr Bey and similarly unsuccessful in his challenge against Amr in 1935.

Butcher also won the British Professional Championship in 1930, 1931 and 1932.

Butcher was considered a very innovative player in his time. He deviated from the conventional up-and-down-the-wall style adopted by most players in his era, making full use of boasts (shots that come off a side wall before hitting the front wall), lobs, drop shots and reverse angles, as well as cultivating the serve. His lack of stamina during long matches was considered to be one of his main weaknesses, however, and this gave the athletic Amr Bey a key advantage over Butcher on the occasions they played.

He was the first person to make an instructional squash video, which was filmed on the doubles court of St. John's Wood in 1938.
