= Conservative Club =

Gentlemen's club in London, England

Coordinates: 51.50881°N 0.14273°W

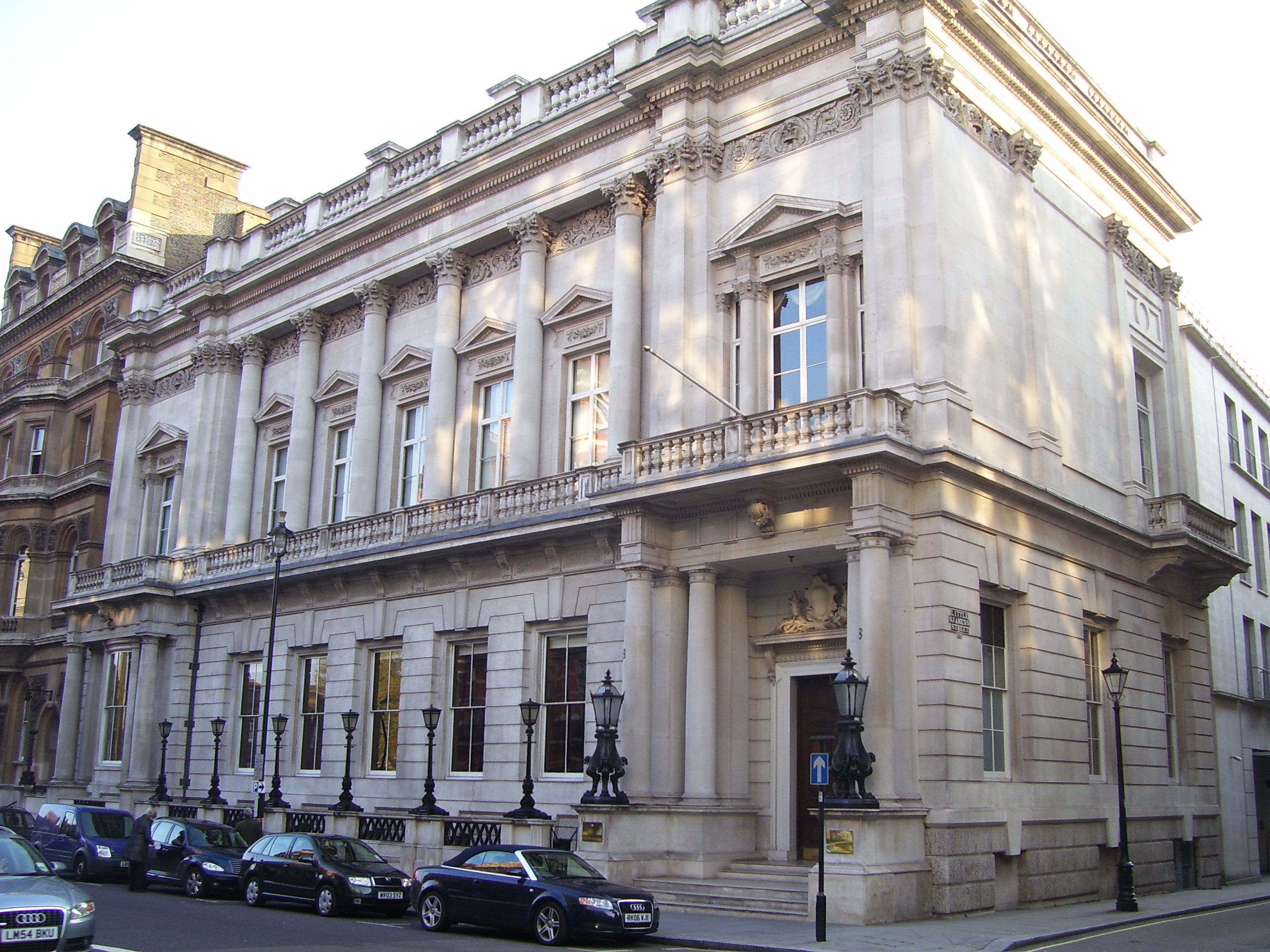
74 St James Street

The Conservative Club was a London gentlemen's club, now dissolved, which was established in 1840. In 1950 it merged with the Bath Club, and was disbanded in 1981. From 1845 until 1959, the club occupied a building at 74 St James's Street where the Thatched House Tavern had previously stood.

As the name implies, the club was politically aligned to the Conservatives, but it was formed at the outset for dissident Tories out of favour with the Carlton Club, and its membership contained rebellious MPs and activists during its history.

== History ==
Attendees at the inaugural meeting on 29 July 1840 were Quintin Dick MP, Viscount Castlereagh MP, W. S. Blackstone MP, the Hon. Captain Duncombe MP, Thomas Hawkes MP, W. A. Mackinnon MP, John Neeld MP, P. D. Pauncefort Duncombe, Charles Hopkinson, and Thomas Walford. At first, the club met in the Lansdowne Hotel in Dover Street, before taking up rooms in the Royal Hotel at 88 St. James's Street, until the clubhouse's 1845 completion.

The clubhouse was designed by George Basevi and Sydney Smirke with a Palladian facade. The Reception Salon and gallery contains murals by Frederick Sang painted during the early 1850s in the Italianate style, modelled on Roman and Pompeian works. The mosaic floors were probably designed by Owen Jones, prefabricated by Blashfield.

In 1941, the non-political Bath Club was hit by a bomb, and after several moves to temporary accommodation, they were granted the hospitality of the Conservative Club. As the decade wore on, it was decided to merge the two clubs – in 1950 they became the Bath Club in name, although retaining the Conservative Club's premises until the end of the decade.

Mark Ashton, later a gay activist and General Secretary of the Young Communist League from 1985 to 1986, worked as a barmaid in drag at the club.

The Thatched House Tavern, a famed coffee house, occupied the site prior to the present building, hosting inaugural meetings of the Royal Yacht Squadron, United Service Club and Carlton Club.

== See also ==
- Association of Conservative Clubs
- List of gentlemen's clubs in London
- Conservative Club, Edinburgh
