= Bath Club =

Former London gentlemen's club

Coordinates: 51.50881°N 0.14273°W

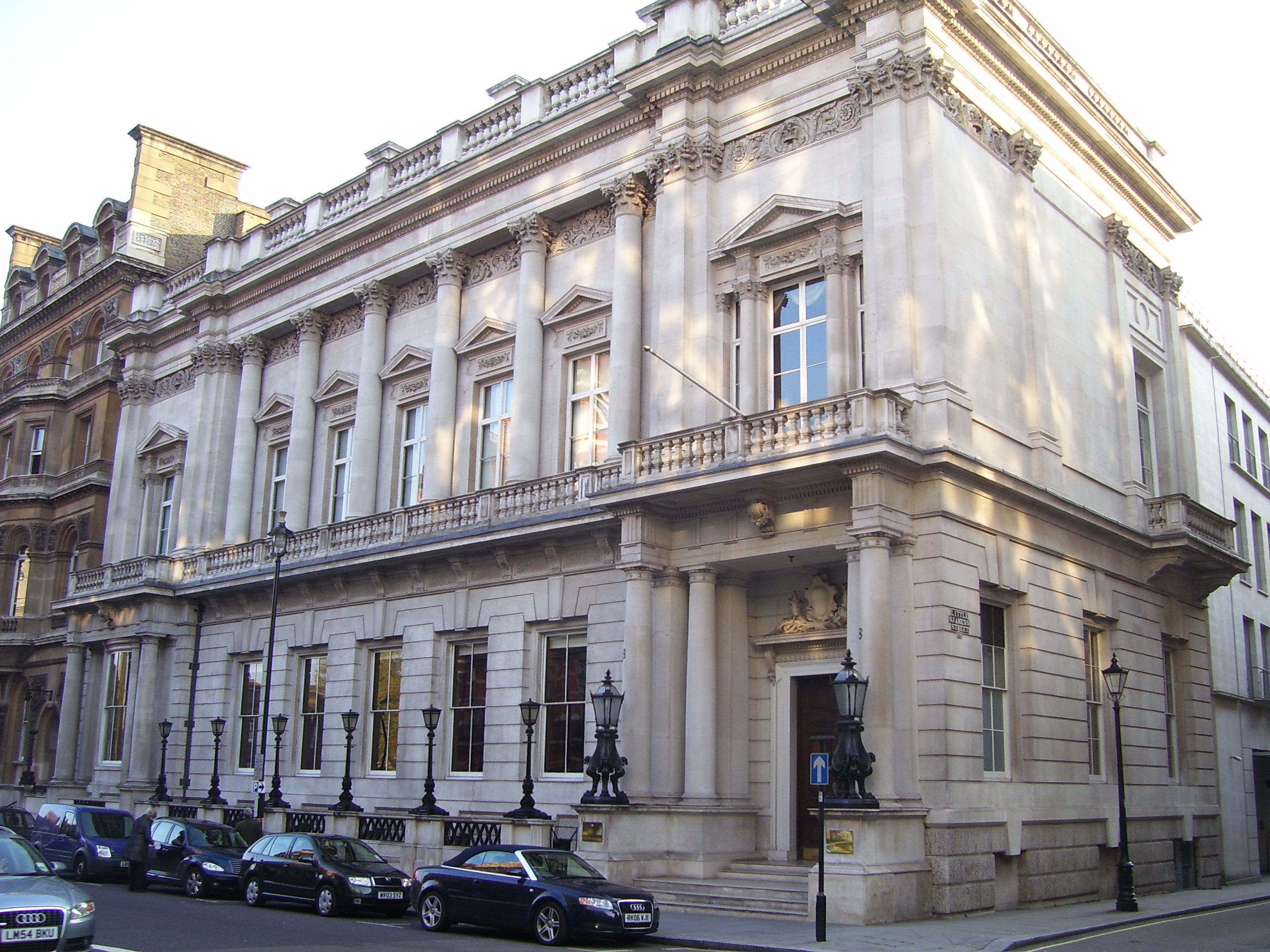
74 St James Street

The Bath Club was a sports-themed London gentlemen's club in the 20th century. It was established in 1894 at 34 Dover Street. Its swimming pool was a noted feature, and it is thought that the swimming pool of the fictional Drones Club (also on Dover Street) was based on this. It is also where Princess Margaret and Queen Elizabeth II learned to swim. It was one of the few gentleman's clubs that admitted women. Sir Henry "Chips" Channon was a member. Mark Twain stayed here when he visited London. Guglielmo Marconi stayed here as well when he visited London.

On the evening of March 17, 1899 the Bath Club was the venue of a popular exhibition of historical fencing styles by Captain Alfred Hutton and of Japanese jujutsu by Edward William Barton-Wright, thus becoming one of the first places where Asian martial arts had been exhibited in the Western world.

In 1924 a sporting member of the club, Gerald Robarts, travelled to the United States and unexpectedly won the American Squash Racquets Singles Championship.

The club building was hit by bombs during the Blitz in 1941, and the club never wholly recovered. After the bombing, it was housed by the struggling Conservative Club at 74 St James's Street, which eventually agreed to a full merger in 1950 under the name of the Bath Club, retaining the Conservative Club's St James's Street club house until 1959. It subsequently moved to 43 Brook Street, and it finally closed in 1981.

Located just down the street from Claridge's, the Bath Club was unusual for London clubs at the time, for it had a ladies' section with an elegant drawing room for afternoon tea. At the ground floor level there was a large dining room with paintings very like Canaletto's on the walls.

Upstairs there was a lounge area with backgammon and card tables and separately a bar. Off the lounge area was a full sized snooker table.

A consortium of members acquired control of the club and then proceeded to sell the lease. The other members could do nothing to stop it. The club was closed in 1981 with members being offered the opportunity to join either the Naval and Military Club or the Carlton Club.

The club was famous for its annual mixed backgammon Tournaments the last of which was held in May 1980.

The club also had its own squash courts, unusual for a central London location and the Bath Club Cup was an annual fixture for London squash players.

The Flyfishers Club shared part of the Bath Club premises during the last few years of the club's life

== See also ==
- List of London's gentlemen's clubs
