= 1960 Women's British Open Squash Championship =

British Open Squash Championships
- 32nd Women's British Open Championships

Details
- Location: London, England
- Venue: Lansdowne Club

The 1960 Ladies Open Championships was held at the Lansdowne Club in London from 15 to 21 February 1960.
Sheila Macintosh (née Speight) finally won the title after losing in four consecutive finals to the retired Janet Morgan. Macintosh defeated Fran Marshall in the final.

== Seeds ==
1. (England) Sheila Macintosh (née Speight)
2. (England) Fran Marshall
3. (England) Rosemary Deloford
4. (England) Diane Corbett
5. (England) M E Gowthorpe
6. (England) Claire Hargreaves
7. (England) J M Goodin
8. (Wales) Jill Campion

== Draw and results ==
=== First round ===
| Player one | Player two | Score |
|---|---|---|
| (England) Annette Picton | (England) S J Hogg | 9-4 9-5 9-0 |
| (England) R Nagle | (England) J Travis | 9-4 9-1 6-9 7-9 9-7 |
| (England) M C Axford | (Kenya) A Hook | 9-1 9-2 9-2 |
| (Wales) Marion Lloyd | (England) L E Lefevre | 9-5 9-4 9-2 |
| (England) K Tomlin | (England) R D Paird | 9-4 9-0 9-4 |
| (England) G A Pears | (England) J M Gilley | 9-7 9-7 9-0 |
| (England) VA Roberts | (England) J Butler | 9-5 9-0 4-9 9-1 |

denotes seed (*)
Seeded players Miss M E Gowthorpe and Mrs J M Goodin both withdrew.

=== Second round ===
| Player one | Player two | Score |
|---|---|---|
| (England) Sheila Macintosh- Speight (1) | (England) Daphne Portway | 9-0 9-0 9-2 |
| (England) Fran Marshall (2) | (England) Ann Price | 9-0 9-1 9-0 |
| (England) Rosemary Deloford (3) | (England) J E A Lanning | 9-2 9-1 9-0 |
| (England) Diane Corbett (4) | (England) A Mostyn | w/o |
| (England) P Gimson | (England) Claire Hargreaves (6) | w/o |
| (Wales) Jill Campion (8) | (Wales) Marion Lloyd | 9-2 4-9 6-9 9-3 9-5 |
| (England) B E Simister | (England) Pat Gotla (née Cowney) | w/o |
| (England) R B Hawkey | (England) J Wilson | w/o |
| (England) J F Leslie | (England) K J Dempsey | 9-7 9-4 9-6 |
| (England) B M Horton | (England) C J Taunton | 9-7 9-7 3-9 3-9 9-1 |
| (England) P C Drew | (England) S P Y Whitby | 9-0 9-0 9-0 |
| (England) VA Roberts | (England) M C Axford | 5-9 9-5 9-3 9-5 |
| (England) Marjorie Townsend | (England) J McMillan | 9-2 9-0 9-2 |
| (England) Annette Picton | (England) G A Pears | 7-9 10-8 9-3 9-3 |
| (England) Sheila Ervin | (England) J M Mallen | Both scratched |
| (England) K Tomlin | (England) R Nagle | 9-2 9-1 9-6 |

=== Third round ===
| Player one | Player two | Score |
|---|---|---|
| (England) Marshall | (England) Ervin/Mallen | w/o |
| (England) Macintosh | (England) Leslie | 9-4 9-0 9-3 |
| (England) Corbett | (England) Townsend | 9-3 9-3 5-9 9-2 |
| (England) Deloford | (England) Simister | 9-1 9-6 9-7 |
| (England) Gimson | (England) Horton | 7-9 10-8 6-9 9-7 9-6 |
| (England) Drew | (England) Hawkey | 9-2 9-0 9-0 |
| (Wales) Campion | (England) Picton | 10-8 9-3 9-10 9-3 |
| (England) Tomlin | (England) Roberts | 7-9 9-3 9-0 9-6 |

=== Quarter-finals ===
| Player one | Player two | Score |
|---|---|---|
| (England) Marshall | (England) Gimson | 9-2 9-3 9-2 |
| (England) Macintosh | (England) Drew | 9-0 9-1 9-4 |
| (England) Deloford | (Wales) Campion | 9-2 9-0 9-7 |
| (England) Corbett | (England) Tomlin | 9-1 9-0 9-1 |

=== Semi-finals ===
| Player one | Player two | Score |
|---|---|---|
| (England) Marshall | (England) Corbett | 9-1 9-3 4-9 9-0 |
| (England) Macintosh | (England) Deloford | 9-3 9-3 9-4 |

=== Final ===
| Player one | Player two | Score |
|---|---|---|
| (England) Macintosh | (England) Marshall | 4-9 8-9 9-5 9-3 9-6 |

| Preceded by 1959 | British Open Squash Championships; England (London); 1960 | Succeeded by 1961 |
