= 1956 Women's British Open Squash Championship =

British Open Squash Championships
- 28th Women's British Open Championships

Details
- Location: London, England
- Venue: Lansdowne Club

The 1956 Ladies Open Championships was held at the Lansdowne Club in London from 20–26 February 1956.
Janet Morgan won her seventh consecutive title defeating Sheila Speight in the final.

== Seeds ==
1. (England) Miss Janet Morgan
2. (England) Miss Sheila Speight
3. (England) Mrs Marjorie Townsend
4. (England) Mrs Ruth Turner
5. (Wales) Mrs Jill Campion
6. (England) Miss M E Gowthorpe
7. (England) Mrs Rosemary Deloford
8. (England) Miss D C Herman

== Draw and results ==
=== First round ===
Player One	Player Two	Score
(England) Mrs Rosemary Deloford (7)	(England) Miss N Sage	9-1 9-0 9-0
(England) Miss D C Herman (8)	(England) Miss A V M Isaac	9-10 9-2 9-2 9-1
(England) Miss Daphne Portway	(England) Miss S Jones	9-6 9-4 9-3
(England) Mrs R Cooper	(England) Miss P Flower	9-0 9-0 9-0
(England) Miss Jenifer Gidwell	(England) Miss A Doe	9-6 9-2 9-7
(England) Mrs P Colyer	(England) Miss J M Gilley	10-8 9-4 9-2
(England) Miss J Duckit	(England) Miss J Covell	w/o
(England) Miss W Peile	(England) Mrs R L Pottinger	9-5 9-5 9-3

denotes seed *

=== Second round ===
Player One	Player Two	Score
(England) Miss Janet Morgan (1)	(England) Mrs J B Watson	w/o
(England) Miss Sheila Speight (2)	(England) Mrs B A Powell	9-5 9-0 9-0
(England) Mrs Marjorie Townsend (3)	(England) Miss J Dannatt	9-6 9-2 9-2
(England) Mrs Ruth Turner (4)	(England) Mrs R B Wilson	9-0 9-4 9-2
(Wales) Mrs Jill Campion (5)	(England) Miss E Wilson	w/o
(England) Miss M E Gowthorpe (6)	(England) Miss J M Martin	9-7 9-0 9-1
(England) Mrs Rosemary Deloford (7)	(England) Miss Jenifer Gidwell	8-10 9-1 4-9 9-2 9-0
(England) Miss D C Herman (8)	(England) Mrs P Colyer	9-3 9-2 9-3
(Wales) Miss Margaret Morgan	(England) Mrs R B Hawkey	9-2 9-1 9-2
(England) Mrs Pat Gotla (née Cowney)	(England) Miss S Peskett	9-0 9-2 10-8
(England) Mrs R Nagle	(England) Miss P Gates	9-4 9-3 9-3
(England) Miss Daphne Portway	(England) Miss J Duckit	9-4 9-5 9-0
(England) Mrs R Cooper	(England) Miss W Peile	9-1 9-1 9-0
(England) Mrs H Bleasby	(England) Miss P H Smallwood	9-2 9-7 9-1
(South Africa) Miss D Lange	(England) Miss Ann Mitham	9-0 9-5 9-2
(England) Mrs J M Hall	(England) Miss V M J McLernon	9-3 9-6 9-5

=== Third round ===
Player One	Player Two	Score
(England) Morgan J (1)	(England) Hall	9-3 9-2 9-4
(England) Speight (2)	(England) Bleasby	9-2 9-3 9-2
(England) Townsend (3)	(England) Lange	9-1 9-3 9-3
(England) Turner (4)	(Wales) Morgan M	9-7 9-2 9-3
(Wales) Campion (5)	(England) Nagle	9-3 3-9 9-5 9-2
(England) Gowthorpe (6)	(England) Gotla	10-9 9-2 9-4
(England) Deloford (7)	(England) Portway	9-7 9-4 9-0
(England) Herman (8)	(England) Cooper	4-9 9-2 9-3 9-7

=== Quarter finals ===
Player One	Player Two	Score
(England) Morgan J (1)	(Wales) Campion (5)	9-4 9-6 9-2
(England) Speight (2)	(England) Gowthorpe (6)	9-5 10-8 9-7
(England) Townsend (3)	(England) Herman (8)	10-9 9-4 5-9 9-6
(England) Turner (4)	(England) Deloford (7)	1-9 6-9 9-2 9-4 9-5

=== Semi finals ===
Player One	Player Two	Score
(England) Morgan (1)	(England) Turner (4)	9-2 9-2 9-7
(England) Speight (2)	(England) Townsend (3)	9-0 9-3 9-6

=== Final ===
Player One	Player Two	Score
(England) Morgan (1)	(England) Speight (2)	9-6 9-4 9-2

Preceded by 1955	British Open Squash Championships; England (London); 1956	Succeeded by 1957
