= 1958 Women's British Open Squash Championship =

British Open Squash Championships
- 30th Women's British Open Championships

Details
- Location: London, England
- Venue: Lansdowne Club

The 1958 Ladies Open Championships was held at the Lansdowne Club in London from 17–23 February 1958.
Janet Morgan won her ninth consecutive title defeating Sheila Macintosh (née Speight) for the third successive year in the final.

== Seeds ==
1. (England) Janet Morgan
2. (England) Sheila Macintosh (née Speight)
3. (England) Ruth Turner
4. (England) Rosemary Deloford
5. (England) R Cooper
6. (England) D C Herman
7. (England) M E Gowthorpe
8. (England) Marjorie Townsend

== Draw and results ==
=== First round ===
Player one	Player two	Score
(England) Ruth Turner (3)	(England) R Nagle	9-3 9-4 9-0
(England) Rosemary Deloford *	(England) E Fagan	9-0 9-0 9-1
(England) M E Gowthorpe (7)	(England) J Butler	9-0 9-2 9-1
(England) Marjorie Townsend*	(England) H F Newberry	9-3 9-1 9-4
(England) D M Holman	(England) J Dannatt	9-4 8-10 9-7 9-2
(England) J B Watson	(England) Major M U Walker	9-2 9-1 9-1
(England) J M Hall	(England) A Cloke	w/o
(England) M Cunneen	(Scotland) R Waterhouse	w/o
(Wales) H E Bond	(England) K Tomlin	10-8 5-9 9-5 9-2
(England) G A Pears	(England) J Sciver	9-3 8-10 9-4 9-1
(England) J M Gilley	(England) B M Horton	7-9 9-1 1-9 10-9 9-5
(England) Bobs Whitehead	(England) Annette Picton	9-1 9-1 9-1
(Wales) C E Harrison	(England) G Macpherson	4-9 5-9 9-1 9-3 9-4
(Wales) M M Hazell	(England) A Doe	9-4 9-4 2-9 9-7
(England) B Davidson	(England) K Abbott	9-2 4-9 1-9 9-5 9-4
(England) V J Foster	(England) Corporal L Collins	9-4 9-0 9-7
(England) J M Goodin	(Wales) Marion Lloyd	9-1 9-0 9-3

denotes seed *

=== Second round ===
Player one	Player two	Score
(England) Janet Morgan (1)	(England) R B Hawkey	9-1 9-2 9-2
(England) Sheila Macintosh (née Speight) (2)	(Kenya) Fran Marshall	9-7 9-1 9-3
(England) Ruth Turner (3)	(England) G A Pears	9-3 9-4 9-3
(England) Rosemary Deloford (4)	(England) J M Gilley	9-3 9-2 9-0
(England) D C Herman *	(England) Daphne Portway	9-0 10-8 9-0
(England) R Cooper*	(England) Ann Mitham	9-5 9-1 9-2
(England) M E Gowthorpe (7)	(England) Bobs Whitehead	9-1 9-0 9-6
(England) Marjorie Townsend*	(Wales) C E Harrison	9-2 9-0 9-2
(England) D M Holman	(Wales) M M Hazell	9-1 9-3 9-7
(England) J B Watson	(England) B Davidson	8-10 9-4 9-6 9-5
(England) J M Hall	(England) Ann Price	9-2 4-9 9-4 9-1
(England) S McMullan	(England) C J Taunton	9-4 4-9 9-6 5-9 9-2
(England) M Cunneen	(England) V J Foster	1-9 4-9 1 10-9 0
(Wales) H E Bond	(England) J M Goodin	9-6 5-9 8-9 9-3 9-5
(England) J Paterson	(England) E Sprawson	9-3 9-1 9-1
(England) Claire Hargreaves	(England) N A Watkins	9-3 2-9 9-2 2-9 9-0

=== Third round ===
Player one	Player two	Score
(England) Morgan	(England) Paterson	9-3 9-1 9-0
(England) Macintosh	(England) Hargreaves	9-0 9-0 9-2
(England) Townsend	(England) Watson	9-2 9-3 9-5
(England) Herman	(England) McMullan	9-1 9-3 9-0
(England) Gowthorpe	(England) Holman	9-5 9-6 9-2
(England) Deloford	(England) Cunneen	9-0 ret
(England) Turner	(Wales) Bond	9-0 9-1 9-6
(England) Cooper	(England) Hall	9-2 9-0 9-7

=== Quarter-finals ===
Player one	Player two	Score
(England) Morgan	(England) Cooper	9-2 9-2 9-6
(England) Macintosh	(England) Herman	3-9 9-3 9-7 9-4
(England) Deloford	(England) Towsend	9-5 2-9 3-9 10-9 9-3
(England) Gowthorpe	(England) Turner	6-9 9-6 9-2 9-5

=== Semi-finals ===
Player one	Player two	Score
(England) Morgan	(England) Gowthorpe	9-5 9-1 9-2
(England) Macintosh	(England) Deloford	9-7 9-6 9-6

=== Final ===
Player one	Player two	Score
(England) Morgan	(England) Macintosh	9-2 9-4 9-2

Preceded by 1957	British Open Squash Championships; England (London); 1958	Succeeded by 1959
