= 1961 Women's British Open Squash Championship =

British Open Squash Championships
- 33rd Women's British Open Championships

Details
- Location: London, England
- Venue: Lansdowne Club

The 1961 Ladies Open Championships was held at the Lansdowne Club in London from 20 to 26 February 1961.
Sheila Macintosh (née Speight) the number one seed was unable to defend her title due to contracting mumps. Fran Marshall defeated Ruth Turner in the final.

== Seeds ==
1. (England) Sheila Macintosh (née Speight)
2. (England) Fran Marshall
3. (England) Ruth Turner
4. (England) Rosemary Deloford
5. (England) M E Gowthorpe
6. (England) Pauline White
7. (England) Jill Campion
8. (Wales) Diane Corbett

== Draw and results ==
=== First round ===
Player one	Player two	Score
(England) Sheila Macintosh (née Speight)		bye
(England) R Nagle		bye
(England) K A Abbott		bye
(England) E N Fraser		bye
(England) M E Gowthorpe		bye
(England) R Cooper	(England) A Norval	9-4 9-6 9–0
(England) J Hawson	(England) N A Watkins	10-9 9-7 9–2
(Australia) Aline Smith	(England) Sally Gildon	9-1 9-2 10–9
(England) Ruth Turner	(United States) G Holleran	9-1 9-0 9–1
(Scotland) R Waterhouse	(England) D Attwood	9-1 9-1 9–2
(England) B M Horton	(England) Daphne Portway	9-1 5-9 9-0 9–0
(England) K Tomlin	(United States) R Lincoln	9-2 9-3 9–2
(England) Bobs Whitehead	(England) K J Dempsey	9-1 9-2 9–0
(Wales) Jill Campion	(United States) K S Magoon	9-0 9-0 9–0
(England) Mary Muncaster	(England) B E Simister	10-8 9-1 9–0
(United States) Joyce Davenport	(England) G T Brooks	9-0 9-1 9–1
(United States) Peggy Carrott	(England) A Brice	9-4 9-6 9–1
(England) Marjorie Townsend	(England) J F Leslie	9-6 9-7 10–9
(England) C J Taunton	(England) J C Hodson	9-0 9-2 9–3
(England) Rosemary Deloford	(England) P D Gimson	9-2 9-0 9–3
(England) J M Goodin	(England) J E A Lanning	9-6 9-4 9–1
(United States) B Lewis	(England) H F Newberry	9-4 9-1 9–6
(England) G A Pears	(Scotland) H J Bell	5-9 9-2 9-2 9–0
(England) Diane Corbett	(United States) H Knapp	9-1 9-5 9–0
(Australia) Jan Shearer	(England) Sally Cave	9-1 9-1 9–1
(England) Barbara Wheen	(England) Annette Picton	w/o
(Wales) Marion Lloyd	(England) A M Backhouse	9-2 9-0 9–1
(England) Pauilne White		bye
(England) R B Hawkey		bye
(England) Ann Price		bye
(Australia) Yvonne West		bye
(England) Fran Marshall (2)		bye

=== Second round ===
Player one	Player two	Score
(England) Nagle	(England) Macintosh	w/o
(England) Marshall	(Australia) West	
(England) Gowthorpe	(England) Cooper	
(Australia) Smith	(England) Hawson	
(England) Turner	(Scotland) Waterhouse	
(England) Tomlin	(England) Horton	
(England) Whitehead	(Wales) Campion	
(England) Muncaster	(United States) Davenport	
(England) Abbott	(England) Fraser	
(England) Townsend	(United States) Carrott	
(England) Deloford	(England) Taunton	
(England) Goodin	(United States) Lewis	
(England) Corbett	(England) Pears	
(Australia) Shearer	(England) Wheen	
(England) White	(Wales) Lloyd	
(England) Price	(England) Hawkey	

=== Third round ===
Player one	Player two	Score
(England) Marshall	(England) Price	9-3 9-4 9–0
(England) White	(Australia) Shearer	5-9 9-4 10-8 9–6
(England) Corbett	(England) Goodin	10-8 9-5 9–7
(England) Deloford	(England) Townsend	9-1 8-10 8-10 9-2 9–7
(England) Whitehead	(England) Muncaster	8-10 6 5 3
(England) Turner	(England) Tomlin	9-1 9-6 9–2
(England) Gowthorpe	(Australia) Smith	9-1 9-3 9–6
(England) Nagle	(England) Abbott	9-7 9-3 9–7

=== Quarter-finals ===
Player one	Player two	Score
(England) Marshall	(England) White	9-3 9-0 9–4
(England) Turner	(England) Whitehead	10-8 9-6 9–7
(England) Corbett	(England) Deloford	9-4 10-9 9–3
(England) Gowthorpe	(England) Nagle	9-0 9-6 9–3

=== Semi-finals ===
Player one	Player two	Score
(England) Marshall	(England) Corbett	9-5 9-4 9–4
(England) Turner	(England) Gowthorpe	7-9 9-5 9-2 9–2

=== Final ===
Player one	Player two	Score
(England) Marshall	(England) Turner	9-3 9-5 9–1

Preceded by 1960	British Open Squash Championships; England (London); 1961	Succeeded by 1962
