= 1954 Women's British Open Squash Championship =

British Open Squash Championships
- 26th Women's British Open Championships

Details
- Location: London, England
- Venue: Lansdowne Club

The 1954 Ladies Open Championships was held at the Lansdowne Club in London from 15–21 February 1954.
Janet Morgan won her fifth consecutive title defeating Sheila Speight in the final.

== Seeds ==
1. (England) Janet Morgan
2. (England) Sheila Speight

(England) Marjorie Townsend
(England) M E Gowthorpe
(England) Alice Teague
(England) Ruth Turner
(Wales) Rachel Byrne

(England) Rosemary Walsh

== Draw and results ==
=== First round ===
Player one	Player two	Score
(England) Janet Morgan (1*)		bye
(England) Sheila Speight (2*)		bye
(England) W Peile		bye
(England) J Dannatt		bye
(England) E I Jonas		bye
(England) Rosemary Walsh*		bye
(England) D Chalk		bye
(England) Bobs Whitehead		bye
(Wales) Rachel Byrne*		bye
(England) E J Boggis		bye
(England) Pat Gotla (née Cowney)		bye
(England) J B Watson		bye
(England) Margaret Dawnay		bye
(England) M H Palmer		bye
(England) D C Herman		bye
(England) Ruth Turner*	(Australia) Judith Tissot	9-7 3-9 9-3 9-7
(England) Alice Teague*	(England) Jennifer Pendered	9-2 9-4 9-3
(England) M E Gowthorpe *	(England) S Cooper	9-3 9-1 9-1
(England) Marjorie Townsend*	(England) J Covell	9-4 9-0 9-1
(Wales) Margaret Morgan	(Wales) M M Hazell	9-7 8-10 9-7 9-6
(England) J M Hall	(England) Barbara Knapp	9-6 6-9 7-9 9-5 9-3
(England) P Smith	(England) Marion Craig-Smith	w/o
(Kenya) Fran Marshall	(England) Captain M U Walker	w/o
(England) V Moore	(England) N A Watkins	9-2 9-0 9-2
(England) J P Marshall	(England) M Young	9-3 9-3 9-3
(England) Major Daphne Portway	(England) R B Hawkey	10-8 9-3 8-10 9-2
(England) E Wilson	(England) S C Palmer	8-10 10-8 9-1 9-2
(England) R E G Parsons	(England) E J Boggis	w/o
(England) R Nagle	(England) L Lefevre	9-3 9-2 9-1
(England) R B R Wilson	(England) Ann Mitham	9-0 9-4 6-9 9-7
(England) J Watkins	(England) K Abbott	9-0 9-5 9-6
(England) J E Manning	(England) Katherine Keith-Steele	w/o

denotes seed *

=== Second round ===
Player one	Player two	Score
(England) Morgan J	(England) Whitehead	9-1 9-0 9-0
(England) Speight	(England) Dannatt	9-3 9-2 9-1
(England) Turner	(Kenya) Marshall	2-9 9-3 9-2 9-1
(England) Teague	(England) Watson	9-4 9-2 9-1
(England) Gowthorpe	(England) Moore	9-1 9-3 9-2
(Wales) Byrne	(England) Dawnay	w/o
(England) Walsh	(England) Palmer	9-2 9-2 9-2
(England) Townsend	(England) Marshall	9-3 9-5 9-5
(England) Powell	(England) Herman	10-8 7-9 9-2 9-3
(England) Gotla	(England) Jonas	9-4 9-4 9-2
(Wales) Morgan M	(England) Manning	9-3 9-5 7-9 10-9
(England) Pelle	(England) Portway	9-0 9-2 9-0
(England) Watson	(England) Wilson	9-6 9-1 9-1
(England) Chalk	(England) Parsons	9-3 9-1 9-7
(England) Hall	(England) Nagle	9-7 9-1 7-9 9-3
(England) Smith	(England) Wilson	4-9 9-2 9-6 10-9

=== Third round ===
Player one	Player two	Score
(England) Morgan J	(England) Powell	9-2 9-0 9-3
(England) Speight	(England) Gotla	9-3 9-2 9-1
(England) Turner	(Wales) Morgan M	9-6 9-0 9-3
(England) Teague	(England) Pelle	9-3 9-3 9-0
(Wales) Byrne	(England) Watson	9-4 9-6 9-0
(England) Walsh	(England) Chalk	9-1 9-3 9-0
(England) Gowthorpe	(England) Hall	6-9 9-6 9-6 9-3
(England) Townsend	(England) Smith	6-9 9-4 9-3 9-2

=== Quarter-finals ===
Player one	Player two	Score
(England) Morgan	(Wales) Byrne	9-0 9-1 6-9 9-2
(England) Speight	(England) Walsh	9-2 9-5 9-3
(England) Turner	(England) Gowthorpe	9-6 9-5 9-2
(England) Teague	(England) Townsend	9-4 5-9 9-1 8-9 9-4

=== Semi-finals ===
Player one	Player two	Score
(England) Morgan	(England) Turner	9-1 9-3 9-2
(England) Speight	(England) Teague	9-5 9-1 9-2

=== Final ===
Player one	Player two	Score
(England) Morgan	(England) Speight	9-3 9-1 9-7

Preceded by 1953	British Open Squash Championships; England (London); 1954	Succeeded by 1955
