= 1947 Women's British Open Squash Championship =

British Open Squash Championships
- 19th Women's British Open Championships

Details
- Location: London, England
- Venue: Lansdowne Club

The 1947 Ladies Open Championships was held at the Lansdowne Club in London from 27 January - 2 February 1947.
Joan Curry won her first title defeating Alice Teague in the final.

== Draw and results ==
=== First round ===
Player one	Player two	Score
(England) Miss Joan Curry		bye
(England) Miss Janet Morgan	(England) Mrs Lewis-Shaw	9-5 9-0 9-0
(England) Mrs Alice Teague	(England) Miss Pat Cowney	9-0 9-4 9-4
(England) Mrs G F Powell		bye
(England) Miss Margaret Carlisle	(England) Miss C Werner	9-0 9-1 9-1
(Belgium) Miss Myriam De Borman	(Wales) Miss Rachel Byrne	9-7 9-1 9-6
(England) Miss Betty Cooke	(England) Miss J Wilson	9-3 9-1 9-0
(Scotland) Miss E E Knox	(Belgium) Miss A de Kettenis	9-1 9-0 9-2
(England) Miss A Taylor		bye
(England) Miss A Gowthorpe	(Belgium) Miss M Dens	8-10 9-2 9-0 9-2
(England) Miss Barbara Knapp	(England) Miss R Howard	9-1 9-4 9-3
(England) Mrs V Leaky		bye
(England) Miss M Piper	(England) Miss K M A Steele	9-3 9-3 10-8
(England) Mrs A Smith		bye
(England) Miss B Cowderoy		bye
(England) Miss V M Ord		bye
(Belgium) Mrs G Pottier		bye
(England) Miss Katherine Keith-Steele	(England) Miss T Caldwell	9-7 9-3 9-10 9-3
(England) Mrs A F B Standfast	(England) Miss A Pratt	9-5 10-8 9-3
(England) Mrs S Woodhouse		bye
(England) Mrs J Price	(Wales) Miss G W James	9-3 3-9 5-9 9-1 9-6
(England) Miss B Kentfield	(England) Mrs D Morgan	10-9 9-4 9-5
(England) Miss J Howard		bye
(Belgium) Mrs M van der Elst		bye
(England) Mrs H S Hughes		bye
(England) Mrs J Bleasby	(England) Sqd. Off. M M Sturge	9-3 9-5 7-9 9-10 9-1
(England) Mrs H A Downey	(England) Miss E Walker	1-9 7-9 9-5 9-6 9-5
(England) Mrs H J Stribling	(England) Miss I J Trangmer	9-10 9-1 10-9 9-6
(England) Mrs W D Porter		bye

=== Second round ===
Player one	Player two	Score
(England) Curry	(Belgium) Pottier	9-0 9-1 9-1
(England) Morgan	(England) Keith-Steele	9-0 9-1 9-0
(England) Teague	(England) Standfast	9-1 9-0 9-3
(England) Powell	(England) Woodhouse	9-0 9-0 9-0
(England) Carlisle	(England) Price	9-1 9-3 9-1
(Belgium) Borman	(England) Kentfield	9-6 9-4 9-4
(England) Cooke	(England) Howard	9-2 9-5 9-4
(Scotland) Knox	(Belgium) van der Elst	9-0 9-0 9-4
(England) Taylor	(England) Hughes	9-0 9-1 9-4
(England) Gowthorpe	(England) Bleasby	2-9 9-3 9-3 9-0
(England) Knapp	(England) Downey	9-1 2-9 9-1 9-6
(England) Piper	(England) Stribling	9-4 9-0 9-0
(England) Ord	(England) Porter	9-2 9-1 7-9 9-2
(England) Smith		bye
(England) Cowderoy		bye
(England) Leakey		bye

=== Third round ===
Player one	Player two	Score
(England) Curry	(England) Taylor	9-0 9-1 9-0
(England) Morgan	(England) Gowthorpe	9-4 9-0 9-1
(England) Teague	(England) Knapp	9-1 9-0 9-1
(England) Powell	(England) Leakey	9-2 9-0 9-2
(England) Piper	(England) Carlisle	9-5 9-10 9-4 9-4
(Belgium) De Borman	(England) Ord	9-1 10-8 9-3
(England) Cooke	(England) Cowderoy	9-0 9-3 9-1
(Scotland) Knox	(England) Smith	9-2 9-1 9-3

=== Quarter-finals ===
Player one	Player two	Score
(England) Piper	(Belgium) De Borman	2-9 9-3 9-7 9-4
(England) Curry	(Scotland) Knox	6-9 9-1 9-2 9-5
(England) Teague	(England) Morgan	7-9 3-9 9-2 9-4 9-2
(England) Powell	(England) Cooke	9-6 9-3 0-9 9-0

=== Semi-finals ===
Player one	Player two	Score
(England) Teague	(England) Powell	8-10 9-1 9-1 9-4
(England) Curry	(England) Piper	9-1 9-2 9-2

=== Final ===
Player one	Player two	Score
(England) Curry	(England) Teague	9-3 10-9 9-5

Preceded by 1939	British Open Squash Championships; England (London); 1947	Succeeded by 1948
