= 1952 Women's British Open Squash Championship =

British Open Squash Championships
- 24th Women's British Open Championships

Details
- Location: London, England
- Venue: Lansdowne Club

The 1952 Ladies Open Championships was held at the Lansdowne Club in London from 9 December 1951 – 16 December 1951.
Janet Morgan won her third consecutive title defeating Joan Curry once again in the final. The competition was held during 1951 but formed part of the 1951/1952 season.

== Seeds ==
1. (England) Janet Morgan
2. (England) Joan Curry

(England) Sheila Speight
(England) M E Gowthorpe
(England) A V M Isaac
(England) Marjorie Townsend
(England) Pat Gotla née Cowney

(Wales) Rachel Byrne

== Draw and results ==
=== First round ===
Player one	Player two	Score
(England) Janet Morgan (1*)		bye
(England) Joan Curry (2*)		bye
(England) I M Roe		bye
(England) Rosemary Walsh		bye
(England) M J Williams		bye
(England) Sheila Speight *		bye
(England) E Vanner		bye
(England) A L Isaac		bye
(England) I M Wood		bye
(England) J L C Cox		bye
(England) M E Gowthorpe*		bye
(England) A V M Isaac*	(England) Major Daphne Portway	9-4 9-1 9-0
(England) Marjorie Townsend*	(England) S C Palmer	9-3 9-2 9-2
(Wales) Rachel Byrne*	(England) J Capes	9-1 9-0 9-10 9-2
(England) Pat Gotla (née Cowney)*	(England) B A Powell	9-5 9-2 9-0
(England) Ruth Turner	(England) Katherine Keith-Steele	9-3 9-2 9-2
(England) M H Palmer	(England) R B Hawkey	9-0 9-0 9-2
(England) Helen Lacy-Hulbert	(England) K A Abbott	9-1 9-5 9-5
(England) R Nagle	(England) Sqd. Off. M M Sturge	9-7 10-9 10-8
(England) B J Grant	(England) F/Offr. J Pawson	4-9 9-0 9-0 9-3
(England) J M Hall	(England) H J Stribling	9-7 9-0 9-4
(England) R Cooper	(England) E I Jonas	9-1 9-3 9-2
(England) J F Gammon	(England) G Riggall	9-7 9-2 9-6
(England) E J Boggis	(England) Captain M Walker	9-4 9-0 9-0
(England) J P Mead	(Denmark) Fru Ellen Kaas	9-0 9-0 9-1
(England) Margot Harris	(England) S Forsyth	9-1 10-9 9-7
(Wales) Margaret Morgan	(England) Major N Christy	9-4 9-0 9-0
(England) M Richards	(England) A A Hodges	1-9 9-7 10-8 8-10 10-8
(England) M A Williams	(Wales) M M Hazell	7-9 9-5 7-9 9-4 9-1
(England) J M Broad	(England) M Barry	9-4 9-0 9-3
(England) A Taylor	(Wales) K A C Martin	w/o
(England) A Dudley-Smith	(England) V M J McLernon	9-1 9-1 9-2

seed *

=== Second round ===
Player one	Player two	Score
(England) Morgan J	(England) Roe	9-0 9-0 9-3
(England) Curry	(England) Isaac A L	w/o
(England) Isaac A V M	(England) Cooper	9-5 9-2 9-6
(England) Speight	(England) Vanner	9-3 9-2 9-3
(England) Townsend	(England) Gammon	9-3 10-8 9-7
(England) Gowthorpe	(England) Boggis	9-2 5-9 9-0 9-6
(Wales) Byrne	(England) Mead	9-4 9-2 9-1
(England) Gotla	(England) Harris	9-4 8-10 6-9 4-9
(England) Walsh	(England) Williams	10-9 9-2 9-1
(England) Wood	(England) Cox	9-2 9-2 9-4
(England) Turner	(Wales) Morgan M	9-6 9-4 9-4
(England) Palmer	(England) Richards	9-6 9-3 9-5
(England) Lacy-Hulbert	(England) Williams	10-9 9-2 9-3
(England) Nagle	(England) Broad	9-7 10-8 9-1
(England) Grant	(England) Taylor	8-10 9-7 9-0 3-9 9-5
(England) Hall	(England) Dudley-Smith	3-9 9-2 9-4 7-9 9-6

=== Third round ===
Player one	Player two	Score
(England) Morgan	(England) Walsh	9-5 9-1 9-0
(England) Turner	(England) Harris	9-7 9-3 9-3
(England) Curry	(England) Wood	9-1 9-4 9-1
(England) Isaac	(England) Hall	9-2 9-4 9-1
(England) Speight	(England) Lacy-Hulbert	9-2 9-1 10-8
(England) Townsend	(England) Palmer	9-1 9-2 9-5
(England) Gowthorpe	(England) Nagle	9-1 9-2 9-5
(Wales) Byrne	(England) Grant	9-3 9-4 9-3

=== Quarter-finals ===
Player one	Player two	Score
(England) Morgan	(England) Speight	9-6 9-6 9-2
(England) Turner	(England) Townsend	9-6 9-5 5-9 5-9 10-8
(England) Curry	(England) Gowthorpe	9-1 9-5 3-9 9-2
(England) Isaac	(Wales) Byrne	9-0 9-2 9-3

=== Semi-finals ===
Player one	Player two	Score
(England) Morgan	(England) Isaac	9-2 9-3 3-9 9-0
(England) Curry	(England) Turner	9-3 10-8 7-9 9-2

=== Final ===
Player one	Player two	Score
(England) Morgan	(England) Curry	9-3 9-1 9-5

Preceded by 1951	British Open Squash Championships; England (London); 1952	Succeeded by 1953
