= 1959 Women's British Open Squash Championship =

British Open Squash Championships
- 31st Women's British Open Championships

Details
- Location: London, England
- Venue: Lansdowne Club

The 1959 Ladies Open Championships was held at the Lansdowne Club in London from 20–26 February 1959.
Janet Morgan announced that she was to retire on medical advice after the 1959 Championship; she duly won an incredible tenth consecutive title defeating Sheila Macintosh (née Speight) for the fourth successive year in the final. Later in the year Morgan retired and married becoming Janet Bisley and the following year Macintosh would finally have the chance to compete without having to play Morgan.

== Seeds ==
1. (England) Janet Morgan
2. (England) Sheila Macintosh (née Speight)
3. (England) Rosemary Deloford
4. (England) D C Herman
5. (England) M E Gowthorpe
6. (England) Marjorie Townsend
7. (England) Ruth Turner
8. (England) R Cooper

== Draw and results ==
=== First round ===
| Player one | Player two | Score |
|---|---|---|
| (England) Rosemary Deloford (3) | (England) Claire Hargreaves | 9-3 9-1 9-5 |
| (England) Ruth Turner (7) | (England) T Stevenson | 9-1 9-1 9-5 |
| (England) R Cooper (8) | (England) B M Horton | 9-2 9-1 9-5 |
| (England) C Ashton | (England) J M Gilley | 9-0 9-0 9-5 |
| (England) H Bleasby | (England) H F Newberry | 9-4 9-4 9-2 |
| (England) Bobs Whitehead | (England) P Drew | 6-9 9-0 9-1 3-9 9-2 |
| (England) Annette Picton | (England) P H Smallwood | 9-1 9-0 9-4 |
| (England) R Nagle | (England) Whitby | 9-3 9-1 9-4 |
| (England) Fran Marshall | (England) J M Goodin | 9-6 9-2 9-2 |
| (England) J M Hall | (England) J Lancaster | 5-9 7-9 9-4 9-3 9-5 |
| (Wales) M M Hazell | (Wales) H Jolly | 9-7 9-0 9-1 |
| (Wales) C E Harrison | (England) J M Mallen | 9-3 7-9 9-5 3-9 9-5 |
| (Wales) Marion Lloyd | (England) B E Simister | 9-5 9-5 9-6 |
| (England) G Pears | (England) Pat Gotla (née Cowney) | 9-6 9-4 2-9 9-5 |
| (England) R B Hawkey | (England) Major M U Walker | 9-2 9-6 9-4 |
| (England) S McMullan | (England) C J Taunton | 2-9 6-9 9-7 9-2 9-3 |

denotes seed (*)

=== Second round ===
| Player one | Player two | Score |
|---|---|---|
| (England) Janet Morgan (1) | (Wales) H E Bond | w/o |
| (England) Sheila Macintosh (née Speight) (2) | (Scotland) H J Bell | 9-2 9-1 9-0 |
| (England) Rosemary Deloford (3) | (England) Bobs Whitehead | 9-5 6-9 9-6 9-2 |
| (England) D C Herman (4) | (England) R Nagle | 9-2 9-1 9-0 |
| (England) M E Gowthorpe (5) | (England) N A Watkins | 9-2 9-1 9-1 |
| (England) Marjorie Townsend (6) | (England) J Covell | 9-2 9-1 9-3 |
| (England) Ruth Turner (7) | (Wales) M M Hazell | 9-4 7-9 9-1 9-1 |
| (England) R Cooper (8) | (Wales) C E Harrison | 9-3 9-0 9-1 |
| (England) D M Holman | (England) Ann Mitham | 9-5 9-0 9-1 |
| (South Africa) D Lange | (England) K A Abbott | 9-5 9-0 9-7 |
| (England) J M Hall | (Wales) Marion Lloyd | 9-4 9-2 1-9 9-3 |
| (Scotland) R Waterhouse | (England) G Pears | 4-9 9-7 9-4 9-3 |
| (England) Fran Marshall | (England) Annette Picton | 9-2 9-0 9-0 |
| (England) C Ashton | (England) R B Hawkey | 9-2 9-3 9-6 |
| (England) H Bleasby | (England) V J Foster | 9-3 9-8 8-10 1-9 9-4 |
| (England) K Tomlin | (England) S McMullan | 5-9 4-9 9-7 9-3 9-1 |

=== Third round ===
| Player one | Player two | Score |
|---|---|---|
| (England) Morgan | (England) Holman | 9-2 9-0 9-2 |
| (England) Macintosh | (South Africa) Lange | 9-1 9-7 9-1 |
| (England) Marshall | (England) Deloford | 9-6 9-2 3-9 2-9 9-5 |
| (England) Herman | (England) Hall | 9-1 9-0 9-0 |
| (England) Gowthorpe | (Scotland) Waterhouse | 9-2 9-0 9-0 |
| (England) Townsend | (England) Ashton | 9-3 9-1 9-1 |
| (England) Turner | (England) Bleasby | 9-4 9-2 9-6 |
| (England) Cooper | (England) Tomlin | 6-9 9-3 9-5 2-9 9-1 |

=== Quarter-finals ===
| Player one | Player two | Score |
|---|---|---|
| (England) Morgan | (England) Gowthorpe | 9-7 9-7 9-2 |
| (England) Macintosh | (England) Townsend | 9-7 9-7 9-1 |
| (England) Marshall | (England) Turner | 10-9 9-10 2-5 ret |
| (England) Herman | (England) Cooper | 9-2 9-3 9-1 |

=== Semi-finals ===
| Player one | Player two | Score |
|---|---|---|
| (England) Morgan | (England) Marshall | 4-9 4-9 9-2 9-3 9-0 |
| (England) Macintosh | (England) Herman | 9-5 9-6 9-4 |

=== Final ===
| Player one | Player two | Score |
|---|---|---|
| (England) Morgan | (England) Speight | 9-6 9-4 9-2 |

| Preceded by 1958 | British Open Squash Championships; England (London); 1959 | Succeeded by 1960 |
