= 1953 Women's British Open Squash Championship =

British Open Squash Championships
- 25th Women's British Open Championships

Details
- Location: London, England
- Venue: Lansdowne Club

The 1953 Ladies Open Championships was held at the Lansdowne Club in London from 15–22 February 1953.
Janet Morgan won her fourth consecutive title defeating Marjorie Townsend in the final.

== Seeds ==
1. (England) Janet Morgan

(England) Marjorie Townsend
(England) Sheila Speight
(England) M E Gowthorpe
(Wales) Audrey Bates
(England) Alice Teague
(United States) Charlotte Prizer
(England) A V M Isaac
(United States) Barbara Laussat Clement
(United States) M Short
(United States) Blanche Day
(United States) Barbara Banks
(England) Pat Gotla née Cowney
(United States) Maitland-Griggs
(United States) Joan Kock

(England) Ruth Turner

== Draw and results ==
=== First round ===
Player one	Player two	Score
(England) Janet Morgan (1*)		bye
(England) Mrs Marjorie Townsend*		bye
(England) Miss S C Palmer		bye
(England) Miss M J Williams		bye
(England) Sheila Speight *	(England) Miss Barbara Knapp	9-3 9-2 9-0
(England) Miss Rosermay Walsh	(England) Mrs D M Cooper	9-1 9-5 3-9 9-5
(England) Miss M E Gowthorpe*	(England) Mrs R A Johnson	w/o
(England) Mrs Alice Teague*	(England) Mrs J L C Cox	9-2 9-1 9-6
(Wales) Miss Audrey Bates*	(England) Mrs D Rich	9-6 9-3 9-1
(England) Mrs Margot Harris	(England) Miss P Smith	9-3 9-2 9-1
(England) Mrs Helen Lacy-Hulbert	(England) Mrs R B R Wilson	9-5 9-5 9-5
(Wales) Miss M M Hazell	(England) Miss J Mallen	9-6 9-3 9-6
(England) Miss A Cloke	(United States) Miss Joan Kock*	4-9 10-8 9-2 9-5
(England) Miss B Holworthy	(England) Mrs Ruth Turner *	w/o
(England) Mrs Margaret Dawnay	(England) Miss V M J McLernon	9-4 9-3 9-0
(United States) Mrs Charlotte Prizer*	(Wales) Miss Rachel Byrne	w/o
(England) Miss J P Mead	(England) Miss J M Hall	9-2 2-9 3-9 9-4 9-6
(England) Miss A V M Isaac*	(England) Miss M M Sturge	9-10 9-7 9-5 9-3
(Wales) Mrs E Mostyn	(England) Mrs S Bowyer	9-0 9-1 9-1
(United States) Mrs Barbara Laussat Clement *	(England) Miss H A Tucker	9-1 9-2 8-10 9-7
(England) Major Daphne Portway	(England) Miss J Watkins	9-5 3-9 9-4 9-3
(Wales) Miss K A C Martin	(England) Mrs R B Hawkey	9-4 9-6 9-0
(England) Mrs R Nagle	(England) Mrs M A Williams	6-9 9-6 9-4 9-2
(United States) Mrs M Short*	(England) Miss Barraclough	w/o
(United States) Mrs Blanche Day*	(England) Miss E Fosbroke-Hobbes	9-1 8-10 9-6 9-4
(England) Miss K A Abbott	(United States) Mrs Frances Pilling	9-4 9-1 9-0
(England) Mrs G Riggall	(Scotland) Mrs G W Band	9-5 9-0 9-5
(Wales) Miss Margaret Morgan	(England) Mrs B A Powell	5-9 9-1 9-6 9-7
(England) Mrs J B Watson	(United States) Mrs Maitland-Griggs*	9-4 3-9 9-4 9-1
(England) Miss J Stevens	(England) Captain M E Maclagan	9-6 9-4 9-4
(England) Mrs Pat Gotla (née Cowney)*	(United States) Miss Barbara Banks*	9-2 9-10 9-0 9-4
(England) Mrs H Bleasby	(England) Miss W Peile	w/o

seed *

=== Second round ===
Player one	Player two	Score
(England) Morgan J	(England) Palmer	w/o
(England) Townsend	(England) Williams	9-4 9-2 9-3
(England) Speight	(Wales) Mostyn	9-3 3-9 9-4 10-8
(England) Walsh	(United States) Clement	9-4 9-3 9-5
(England) Gowthorpe	(England) Portway	9-4 9-3 9-4
(England) Teague	(Wales) Martin	9-1 9-0 9-0
(Wales) Bates	(England) Nagle	9-2 9-1 9-3
(England) Harris	(United States) Short	9-0 9-0 9-4
(England) Lacy-Hulbert	(United States) Day	9-4 9-1 9-1
(Wales) Hazell	(England) Abbott	9-4 9-6 9-0
(England) Cloke	(England) Riggall	0-9 9-5 9-4 7-9 9-4
(England) Holworthy	(Wales) Morgan M	0-9 5 6-9 3 10-8
(England) Dawnay	(England) Watson	3-9 9-3 9-6 9-1
(United States) Prizer	(England) Stevens	9-5 9-3 9-1
(England) Mead	(England) Gotla	10-8 5-9 9-6 9-7
(England) Isaac AV M	(England) Bleasby	7-9 9-7 9-5 9-0

=== Third round ===
Player one	Player two	Score
(England) Morgan	(England) Lacy-Hulbert	9-5 9-1 9-2
(England) Townsend	(Wales) Hazell	9-5 9-4 9-1
(England) Speight	(England) Cloke	9-0 9-1 9-1
(England) Walsh	(England) Holworthy	9-2 9-4 9-7
(England) Gowthorpe	(England) Dawnay	9-2 9-0 9-3
(England) Teague	(United States) Prizer	9-0 9-3 9-0
(Wales) Bates	(England) Mead	9-1 9-2 9-5
(England) Harris	(England) Isaac	10-9 9-2 9-4

=== Quarter-finals ===
Player one	Player two	Score
(England) Morgan	(England) Gowthorpe	9-5 9-1 9-2
(England) Townsend	(England) Teague	2-9 8-10 9-0 9-5 10-8
(England) Speight	(Wales) Bates	9-4 6-9 9-1 9-0
(England) Walsh	(England) Harris	9-1 7-9 9-5 9-5

=== Semi-finals ===
Player one	Player two	Score
(England) Morgan	(England) Speight	9-6 9-1 9-6
(England) Townsend	(England) Walsh	9-4 5-9 9-6 9-3

=== Final ===
Player one	Player two	Score
(England) Morgan	(England) Townsend	9-4 9-2 9-4

Preceded by 1952	British Open Squash Championships; England (London); 1953	Succeeded by 1954
