= 1950 Women's British Open Squash Championship =

British Open Squash Championships
- 22nd Women's British Open Championships

Details
- Location: London, England
- Venue: Lansdowne Club

The 1950 Ladies Open Championships was held at the Lansdowne Club in London from 19 to 26 February 1950.
Janet Morgan won her first title defeating Joan Curry in the final. Former multiple champion Margot Lumb returned to competition as Mrs Margot Gordon.

== Seeds ==
1. (England) Joan Curry
2. (England) Janet Morgan

(England) Betty Hilton
(England) Margaret Carlisle
(England) Margot Harris
(England) Margot Gordon (née Lumb)

(United States) Peggy Howe

== Draw and results ==
=== First round ===
Player one	Player two	Score
(England) Joan Curry (*1)	(England) A L Isaac	9-3 9-0 9–1
(England) Janet Morgan (*2)	(England) Carroll de Courcy-Hamilton	9-0 9-2 9–0
(England) Margaret Carlisle*	(England) S C Palmer	9-3 9-4 9–1
(England) Margot Harris *	(England) A E Timson	9-1 9-5 9–1
(England) Betty Hilton *	(England) Katherine Keith-Steele	9-1 9-1 9–3
(England) Margot Gordon (née Lumb)*	(England) J P Mead	9-1 9-3 9–1
(United States) Peggy Howe *	(England) M H Palmer	9-0 9-6 9–4
(Wales) Rachel Byrne	(England) S Forsyth	9-2 9-5 9–0
(Wales) Audrey Bates	(England) H Selkirk-Wills	9-0 9-0 9–0
(England) Ruth Turner	(England) H A Downey	9-1 9-2 8-10 9–2
(England) V Ord	(England) C Scott Evans	9-5 7-9 9-7 8-10 9–3
(England) M E Gowthorpe	(England) R G Rolls	9-5 9-6 9–7
(England) D P Chalkin	(United States) Barbara Banks	9-3 9-2 9–1
(England) A V M Isaac	(England) V Hodgson	9-0 9-1 9–0
(England) B Cowderoy	(England) J M Broad	9-3 9-5 9–6
(England) Sheila Speight	(England) B J Grant	9-1 9-0 9–0
(England) Betty Cooke	(England) P Marshall	9-1 9-6 9–3
(United States) Charlotte Prizer	(England) Jnr. Cdr. M Walker	9-2 9-7 9–0
(England) M B Lewis	(England) U Trott	3-9 7-9 9-6 9-2 9–6
(England) Pat Cowney	(England) J E Manning	9-1 9-1 5-9 9–1
(Australia) Betty Meagher	(England) R Nagle	9-1 9-7 9–2
(England) M A Illing	(England) A Kaye	9-4 9-1 9–0
(England) M M Bourne	(England) Snr. Cdr. Daphne Portway	9-7 7-9 8-10 9-4 10–9
(England) H Bleasby	(United States) Sally-Anne Jackson	9-3 9-3 9–5
(United States) Nancy Bayard-Stockton	(England) J B Martin	9-1 9-4 9–1
(England) K A Abbott	(Argentina) R Raikes	9-1 9-5 9–1
(Denmark) Inger Gelardi	(England) Sqd. Off. M M Sturge	9-3 9-5 9–4
(England) A F B Stanfast	(United States) Elizabeth Pearson	9-6 3-9 10-9 3-9 9–4
(England) Barbara Knapp	(England) P R Sutherland	9-2 9-1 9–2
(England) Margaret Dawnay	(Kenya) M S Armytage-MacDonald	9-4 9-10 7-9 9-7 9–3
(Wales) Margaret Morgan	(United States) Helen Stone	9-3 9-2 9–3
(England) Helen Lacy-Hulbert	(England) 2/O N A Swainson	9-7 9-4 9–3

seed *

=== Second round ===
Player one	Player two	Score
(England) Curry	(England) Cooke	10-8 9-4 9–1
(England) Morgan J	(United States) Prizer	9-4 9-0 9–1
(England) Carlisle	(England) Lewis	9-1 9-2 9–2
(England) Harris	(England) Cowney	9-5 9-6 9–5
(England) Hilton	(Australia) Meagher	9-7 9-6 9–0
(England) Gordon	(England) Illing	9-4 9-1 9–2
(United States) Howe	(England) Bourne	9-3 9-0 9–4
(Wales) Byrne	(England) Bleasby	8-10 9-1 9-4 9–3
(Wales) Bates	(England) Martin	9-0 9-1 10–8
(England) Turner	(England) Abbott	9-2 9-3 9–0
(England) Ord	(Denmark) Gelardi	5-9 9-5 5-9 10-8 9–2
(England) Gowthorpe	(England) Stanfast	7-9 9-1 9-3 5-9 10–8
(England) Chalkin	(England) Knapp	9-6 9-3 8-10 9–1
(England) Isaac	(England) Dawnay	10-8 9-6 9–3
(England) Cowderoy	(Wales) Morgan M	10-8 10-8 9–7
(England) Speight	(England) Lacy-Hulbert	10-8 4-9 5-9 9-5 9–5

=== Third round ===
Player one	Player two	Score
(England) Morgan	(Wales) Byrne	5-9 9-2 9-3 10–8
(United States) Howe	(Wales) Bates	9-5 10-8 9–4
(England) Carlisle	(England) Turner	9-3 9-7 9–1
(England) Harris	(England) Ord	9-1 9-6 9–6
(England) Hilton	(England) Gowthorpe	9-7 9-5 9–0
(England) Gordon	(England) Chalkin	9-1 9-4 9–2
(England) Isaac	(England) Cowderoy	9-4 9-3 9–3
(England) Curry	(England) Speight	9-1 9-7 9–4

=== Quarter-finals ===
Player one	Player two	Score
(England) Morgan J	(United States) Howe	9-4 9-5 9–7
(England) Curry	(England) Isaac	9-2 9-5 9–3
(England) Hilton	(England) Gordon	9-5 9-8 9–5
(England) Carlisle	(England) Harris	1-9 2-9 9-4 9-1 9–0

=== Semi-finals ===
Player one	Player two	Score
(England) Morgan	(England) Carlisle	9-3 9-2 9–4
(England) Curry	(England) Hilton	10-8 9-5 9–2

=== Final ===
Player one	Player two	Score
(England) Morgan	(England) Curry	9-4 9-3 9–0

Preceded by 1949	British Open Squash Championships; England (London); 1950	Succeeded by 1951
