= 1957 Women's British Open Squash Championship =

British Open Squash Championships
- 29th Women's British Open Championships

Details
- Location: London, England
- Venue: Lansdowne Club

The 1957 Ladies Open Championships was held at the Lansdowne Club in London from 18 to 23 February.
Janet Morgan won her eighth consecutive title defeating Sheila Speight in a repeat of the 1956 final.

== Seeds ==
1. (England) Janet Morgan
2. (England) Sheila Speight
3. (England) Marjorie Townsend
4. (England) Ruth Turner
5. (England) Rosemary Deloford
6. (England) D C Herman
7. (Wales) Jill Campion
8. (Wales) Margaret Morgan

== Draw and results ==
=== First round ===
Player one	Player two	Score
(England) Janet Morgan (1)	(England) B A Powell	9-4 9-0 9-1
(England) Sheila Speight (2)	(Wales) H E Bond	9-3 9-0 9-3
(England) Marjorie Townsend (3)	(England) J Kinghorn	9-4 9-1 9-6
(England) Ruth Turner (4)	(England) A Roynon	9-4 9-1 9-2
(England) Rosemary Deloford (5)	(England) J M Goodin	9-4 9-2 9-4
(England) D C Herman (6)	(England) P Creek	9-1 9-0 9-3
(Wales) Jill Campion (7)	(England) R B Hawkey	9-3 10-8 9-0
(Wales) Margaret Morgan (8)	(England) N A Watkins	9-2 9-1 9-3
(England) Pat Gotla (née Cowney)	(England) R Nagle	9-2 9-4 9-2
(United States) M C Willcox	(England) Captain M U Walker	w/o
(England) J B Watson	(United States) Peggy White	10-8 10-8 5-9 9-7
(United States) Barbara Laussat Clement	(England) A Cloke	9-0 9-2 9-7
(England) R Cooper	(England) E L Curtis	9-0 9-0 9-1
(United States) Ann Wetzel	(England) T Stevenson	9-5 9-5 9-4
(England) Ann Mitham	(England) K Abbott	9-4 9-4 9-5
(England) B Davidson	(United States) Louisa Manly-Power	9-7 1-9 7-9 10-8 9-5
(England) J M Gilley	(England) S Jones	9-6 9-2 9-5
(United States) Frances Pilling	(England) P Flower	9-0 4-9 1-9 9-6 9-3
(United States) Peggy Carrott	(England) V J Foster	9-5 9-3 9-2
(England) J M Hall	(Wales) C E Harrison	9-0 8-10 9-6 9-4
(England) M E Gowthorpe	(Wales) M M Hazell	9-4 9-3 9-5
(England) Daphne Portway	(England) L Malone	10-9 9-5 1-9 9-5
(England) R L Pottinger	(United States) Charlotte Prizer	7-9 9-5 9-2 9-6
(England) E Foden	(England) P Gates	9-2 9-1 1-9 9-4
(England) G Macpherson	(England) P Colyer	10-8 9-6 3-9 9-7
(United States) Carol Haussermann	(England) P H Smallwood	9-5 9-1 9-7
(Netherlands) J Jamin	(England) J Dannatt	w/o
(England) J Butler	(United States) S Shand	2-9 7-9 9-5 9-5 9-2
(United States) J McCormick	(England) N Sage	9-3 9-0 9-2
(England) Ann Price	(United States) A Shephard	9-0 9-7 9-1
(United States) B Lewis	(England) S Cook	9-3 10-8 9-0
(United States) Betty Constable	(England) J Covell	9-3 9-4 9-4

denotes seed *

=== Second round ===
Player one	Player two	Score
(England) Morgan J	(England) Davidson	9-7 9-0 9-1
(England) Speight	(England) Gilley	9-4 9-0 9-2
(England) Townsend	(United States) Pilling	9-0 9-0 9-3
(England) Turner	(United States) Carrott	9-2 9-1 9-0
(England) Deloford	(England) Hall	9-1 9-1 9-5
(England) Herman	(England) Gowthorpe	10-8 2 3
(Wales) Campion	(England) Portway	9-2 9-4 9-6
(Wales) Morgan M	(England) Pottinger	9-4 9-1 9-2
(England) Gotla	(England) Foden	9-4 9-1 9-1
(United States) Willcox	(England) Macpherson	4-9 10-9 9-5 7-9 9-7
(England) Watson	(United States) Haussermann	9-2 9-1 9-3
(United States) Clement	(Netherlands) Jamin	9-0 9-10 9-0 9-1
(England) Cooper	(England) Butler	9-5 9-1 9-2
(United States) Wetzel	(United States) McCormick	9-2 8-10 9-6 10-8
(England) Mitham	(England) Price	9-2 9-3 10-8
(United States) Betty Constable	(United States) Lewis	9-4 9-2 9-1

=== Third round ===
Player one	Player two	Score
(England) Morgan J	(England) Cooper	9-3 9-4 9-1
(England) Speight	(England) Gotla	9-1 9-4 9-3
(England) Turner	(United States) Willcox	9-0 9-0 9-1
(Wales) Campion	(England) Watson	6-9 9-2 9-1 9-1
(England) Deloford	(United States) Clement	9-1 9-1 9-2
(Wales) Morgan M	(United States) Wetzel	6-9 9-5 9-6 9-4
(England) Herman	(United States) Betty Constable	9-7 9-3 9-2
(England) Townsend	(England) Mitham	9-3 9-3 9-5

=== Quarter-finals ===
Player one	Player two	Score
(England) Morgan J	(England) Deloford	9-2 9-2 7-9 9-4
(England) Speight	(Wales) Morgan M	9-3 9-3 9-5
(England) Turner	(England) Herman	10-9 9-0 9-2
(Wales) Campion	(England) Townsend	9-0 5-9 6-9 9-4 9-2

=== Semi-finals ===
Player one	Player two	Score
(England) Morgan	(England) Turner	9-6 9-5 9-7
(England) Speight	(Wales) Campion	9-5 9-0 9-3

=== Final ===
Player one	Player two	Score
(England) Morgan	(England) Speight	4-9 9-5 9-1 9-6

Preceded by 1956	British Open Squash Championships; England (London); 1957	Succeeded by 1958
