= 1949 Women's British Open Squash Championship =

British Open Squash Championships
- 21st Women's British Open Championships

Details
- Location: London, England
- Venue: Lansdowne Club

The 1949 Ladies Open Championships was held at the Lansdowne Club in London from 10–16 January 1949.
Joan Curry won her third title defeating Janet Morgan in the final.

== Seeds ==
(England) Joan Curry

(England) Janet Morgan
(England) Betty Hilton
(England) Margaret Carlisle
(England) Margot Harris
(Belgium) Myriam De Borman

(England) Betty Cooke

== Draw and results ==
=== First round ===
Player one	Player two	Score
(England) Janet Morgan *	bye	
(England) Joan Curry *	(England) Miss T Stevenson	9-0 9-0 9-3
(England) Mrs Betty Hilton*	(England) Sqd. Off. M M Sturge	9-2 9-1 9-2
(England) Miss Margaret Carlisle*	(England) Mrs D Hobson	9-0 9-0 9-0
(England) Mrs Margot Harris *	(England) Miss U Trott	9-6 9-2 9-4
(Belgium) Miss Myriam De Borman*	(England) Miss M J Mayer	9-2 9-2 9-0
(Wales) Miss G W James	(England) Miss M A Travers	w/o
(England) Miss Betty Cooke *	(England) Miss K Abbot	9-3 9-1 9-2
(Wales) Miss Audrey Bates	(England) Junior Cdr. Daphne Portway	9-3 9-7 9-2
(England) Miss Pat Cowney	(England) Mrs M B Lewis	9-4 9-5 9-1
(England) Mrs D F Morgan	(England) Mrs A E Timson	9-1 9-2 9-2
(Kenya) Mrs M S Armytage-MacDonald	(England) Miss D Castle	7-6 ret hurt
(England) Sheila Speight	(England) Miss S C Palmer	9-1 9-6 9-4
(England) Mrs J L C Cox	(Belgium) Mrs M Pacquet	9-7 9-0 9-0
(England) Miss A L Isaac	(Belgium) Mrs E Van der Elst	w/o
(England) Mrs Marjorie Townsend	(England) Mrs F M Edmonds	9-0 9-0 9-1
(England) Mrs J Hall	(England) Mrs G E Baker	9-1 9-7 9-0
(England) Rosemary Walsh	(England) Miss K M A Steele	9-7 9-6 9-1
(England) Mrs Helen Lacy-Hulbert	(England) Mrs H J Stribling	9-10 9-1 9-6 10-8
(England) Miss M A Iling	(England) Miss J M Broad	0-9 9-4 9-5 9-6
(England) Miss A V M Isaac	(England) Mrs M Richards	9-0 9-2 9-2
(England) Mrs M Anthony-Davies	(England) Mrs W D Porter	9-6 9-4 9-1
(England) Mrs M M Bourne	(England) Mrs Alice Teague*	w/o
(England) Miss A A Hodges	(England) Miss Kay Tuckey	9-4 10-8 9-7
(England) Miss M H Palmer	(Belgium) Miss Nelly Glamonna	9-2 9-6 9-6
(England) Miss V Ord	(England) 2/O N A Swainson	5-9 9-4 9-7 9-4
(England) Mrs Violet St Clair Morford	(England) Miss P R Sutherland	9-7 9-5 9-10 9-4
(England) Mrs J B Parker	(England) Mrs D Liddell	w/o
(Netherlands) Mrs M Van Laer	(England) Miss R McClenaghan	9-0 9-1 5-9 10-8
(England) Mrs A Mostyn	(England) Mrs H A Downey	6-9 9-2 7-9 9-2 9-1
(England) Mrs J Rathbone	(England) Peggy Dawson-Scott	w/o
(Belgium) Mrs J Pottier	(England) Sub. M Walker ATS	9-7 6-9 6-9 9-4 9-3

seed *

=== Second round ===
Player one	Player two	Score
(England) Curry	(England) Hall	9-2 9-5 9-4
(England) Morgan J	(England) Walsh	9-1 9-1 9-0
(England) Hilton	(England) Lacy-Hulbert	9-2 9-0 9-1
(England) Carlisle	(England) Iling	9-0 9-2 9-0
(England) Harris	(England) A L Isaac	9-2 9-3 9-1
(Belgium) De Borman	(England) Anthony-Davies	9-2 9-0 9-3
(Wales) James	(England) Bourne	10-8 5 6
(England) Cooke	(England) Hodges	9-3 9-2 9-1
(Wales) Bates	(England) Palmer	9-2 9-3 9-1
(England) Cowney	(England) Ord	9-0 9-4 9-6
(England) Morgan D F	(England) St Clair Morford	9-2 9-7 4-9 9-7
(Kenya) Armytage-M	(England) Parker	9-1 9-0 9-5
(England) Speight	(Netherlands) Van Laer	9-0 9-3 9-2
(England) Cox	(England) Mostyn	9-4 9-6 9-4
(England) A V M Isaac	(England) Rathbone	9-7 3-9 0-9 9-3 9-7
(England) Townsend	(Belgium) Pottier	9-0 9-0 9-3

=== Third round ===
Player one	Player two	Score
(England) Curry	(Wales) Bates	9-4 9-1 9-2
(England) Morgan J	(England) Isaac	9-3 9-2 9-3
(England) Hilton	(England) Townsend	9-2 4-9 9-2 9-4
(England) Carlisle	(England) Cowney	9-0 9-4 6-9 9-1
(England) Harris	(England) Cox	9-2 9-1 9-2
(Belgium) De Borman	(Kenya) Armytage-M	9-7 6-9 9-5 9-2
(Wales) James	(England) Speight	4-9 9-4 10-8 9-2
(England) Cooke	(England) Morgan D F	9-5 9-1 9-6

=== Quarter-finals ===
Player one	Player two	Score
(England) Morgan	(England) Harris	9-0 9-3 9-2
(England) Curry	(Belgium) De Borman	9-1 9-1 9-7
(England) Hilton	(Wales) James	9-4 9-4 9-3
(England) Carlisle	(England) Cooke	9-0 9-6 9-2

=== Semi-finals ===
Player one	Player two	Score
(England) Morgan	(England) Hilton	9-1 9-3 9-2
(England) Curry	(England) Carlisle	0-9 9-2 9-0 9-0

=== Final ===
Player one	Player two	Score
(England) Curry	(England) Morgan	2-9 9-3 10-8 9-0

Preceded by 1948	British Open Squash Championships; England (London); 1949	Succeeded by 1950
