= 1951 Women's British Open Squash Championship =

British Open Squash Championships
- 23rd Women's British Open Championships

Details
- Location: London, England
- Venue: Lansdowne Club

The 1951 Ladies Open Championships was held at the Lansdowne Club in London from 5–11 February 1951.
Janet Morgan won her second title defeating Joan Curry in a repeat of the 1950 final.

== Seeds ==
1. (England) Janet Morgan
2. (England) Joan Curry
3. (England) Margot Harris
4. (Wales) Audrey Bates - withdrew

(England) A V M Isaac
(England) Marjorie Townsend
(England) Helen Lacy-Hulbert

(Wales) Rachel Byrne

== Draw and results ==
=== First round ===
Player one	Player two	Score
(England) Janet Morgan (*1)		bye
(England) Joan Curry (*2)		bye
(England) Mrs E Vanner		bye
(Belgium) Miss Nelly Glamonna		bye
(England) Mrs H A Downey		bye
(England) Mrs J L C Cox		bye
(England) Mrs R Nagle		bye
(England) Mrs M Richards		bye
(England) Mrs Marjorie Townsend*	(England) Mrs A E Timson	9-0 9-2 9-2
(England) Mrs Helen Lacy-Hulbert *	(England) Miss K A Abbott	9-2 9-5 9-4
(England) Mrs Margot Harris (*3)	(England) 3/O J M Morgan	9-1 9-0 9-0
(England) Miss A V M Isaac*	(England) Mrs T Veith-Brown	9-2 9-0 9-1
(England) Mrs J E Manning	(England) Miss S C Palmer	9-2 9-4 9-4
(England) Miss M H Palmer	(England) L/Wren A Tate	9-4 9-0 10-8
(England) Sheila Speight	(England) Mrs Margaret Dawnay	9-3 5-9 9-4 9-5
(England) Mrs M B Lewis	(England) Miss H Selkirk-Wells	9-0 9-0 9-0
(England) Mrs D Cooper	(England) Mrs J Mills	9-0 9-0 9-0
(England) Miss M Gowthorpe	(England) Miss Carroll de Courcy-Hamilton	9-5 9-0 9-4
(England) Miss J Capes	(Republic of Ireland) Miss L Jackson	1-9 9-7 9-1 9-6
(England) Mrs Pat Gotla (née Cowney)	(Wales) Miss Rachel Byrne *	9-5 5-9 9-5 9-7
(England) Mrs J M Hall	(England) Rosemary Walsh	9-1 7-9 9-7 10-9
(England) Mrs M Cunneen	(Denmark) Fru Ellen Kaas	9-4 9-0 9-2
(England) Mrs H J Stribling	(England) Mrs G Riggall	9-7 5-9 5-9 9-1 9-4
(Wales) Miss Margaret Morgan	(England) Mrs R B Hawkey	9-2 9-0 10-9
(England) Miss Katherine Keith-Steele	(Denmark) Miss Linda Winkel	9-3 9-6 9-0
(England) Miss P Marshall	(England) 2/O H M Jones	9-5 9-0 9-7
(England) Miss E Wilson	(England) Mrs Y Barbor	9-1 9-0 9-4
(England) Major N Christy	(England) Miss M Dwelly	9-2 5-9 10-8 9-3
(England) Mrs Sheila McKechnie	(England) F/Officer J Pawson	9-3 9-7 9-5
(England) Mrs B A Powell	(England) Miss J P Mead	9-7 9-4 9-1
(Netherlands) Mrs Van der Geissen	(England) Mrs J Evers	9-3 9-4 3-9 9-5
(England) Miss A L Isaac	(England) Miss W Josephs	9-7 6-9 9-3 9-3

denotes seed *
Mrs Audrey Bayes (Wal 4*) withdrew because of influenza

=== Second round ===
Player one	Player two	Score
(England) Morgan	(England) Downey	9-1 9-1 9-1
(England) Townsend	(England) Hall	9-5 7-9 9-4 9-7
(England) Lacy-Hulbert	(England) Cunneen	9-0 9-1 9-1
(England) Harris	(England) Stribling	9-4 9-2 9-0
(England) Isaac A V	(Wales) Morgan M	9-3 9-3 5-9 9-3
(England) Curry	(England) Cox	9-4 9-2 9-4
(England) Richards	(England) Nagle	9-6 6-9 9-3 9-4
(England) Manning	(England) Keith-Steele	9-4 9-5 9-1
(England) Vanner	(Belgium) Glamonna	w/o
(England) Palmer	(England) Marshall	10-8 9-4 9-2
(England) Speight	(England) Wilson	9-1 9-0 9-1
(England) Lewis	(England) Christy	9-1 2-9 9-3 9-3
(England) Cooper	(England) McKechnie	9-0 9-0 9-6
(England) Gowthorpe	(England) Powell	9-0 3-9 3 9-2
(England) Capes	(Netherlands) Van der Geissen	9-0 9-0 9-7
(England) Gotla	(England) Isaac A L	9-1 9-1 9-0

=== Third round ===
Player one	Player two	Score
(England) Morgan J	(England) Vanner	9-1 9-2 9-1
(England) Speight	(England) Lacy-Hulbert	9-4 10-9 9-3
(England) Curry	(England) Richards	9-4 9-2 9-1
(England) Gowthorpe	(England) Harris	9-3 9-0 2-9 8-10 9-2
(England) Townsend	(England) Palmer	9-2 9-6 9-4
(England) Cooper	(England) Lewis	9-3 9-3 9-1
(England) Isaac	(England) Manning	9-5 9-2 9-3
(England) Gotla	(England) Capes	9-3 9-1 9-3

=== Quarter-finals ===
Player one	Player two	Score
(England) Morgan	(England) Townsend	9-1 9-0 9-3
(England) Speight	(England) Cooper	9-5 9-1 9-0
(England) Curry	(England) Isaac	9-4 9-6 9-1
(England) Gowthorpe	(England) Gotla	9-7 7-9 1-9 10-8 9-6

=== Semi-finals ===
Player one	Player two	Score
(England) Morgan	(England) Speight	9-3 9-1 9-1
(England) Curry	(England) Gowthorpe	9-3 9-0 9-2

=== Final ===
Player one	Player two	Score
(England) Morgan	(England) Curry	9-1 2-9 9-3 9-4

Preceded by 1950	British Open Squash Championships; England (London); 1951	Succeeded by 1952
