= 1948 Women's British Open Squash Championship =

British Open Squash Championships
- 20th Women's British Open Championships

Details
- Location: London, England
- Venue: Lansdowne Club

The 1948 Ladies Open Championships was held at the Lansdowne Club in London from 19–25 January 1948.
Joan Curry won her second title defeating Janet Morgan in the final.

== Seeds ==
1. (England) Joan Curry
2. (England) Janet Morgan
3. (England) Alice Teague
4. (England) Margaret Carlisle

== Draw and results ==
=== First round ===
Player one	Player two	Score
(England) Joan Curry		bye
(England) Janet Morgan		bye
(England) Miss M H Palmer		bye
(England) Mrs J Hall		bye
(England) Miss M Piper		bye
(England) Mrs M G Magniac		bye
(England) Miss R Howard		bye
(England) Miss P Sutherland		bye
(England) Mrs Alice Teague	(England) Mrs D Hobson	9-4 9-2 9-0
(England) Miss Margaret Carlisle	(England) Miss J Taylor	9-2 9-0 9-2
(England) Mrs Margot Harris	(England) Miss M E Sarel	9-0 9-0 9-2
(Belgium) Miss Myriam De Borman	(England) Miss P R Read	9-1 9-4 9-0
(England) Mrs Betty Hilton	(England) Miss U Trott	9-1 9-6 9-5
(England) Miss Betty Cooke	(England) Mrs L E Lefevre	w/o
(England) Peggy Dawson-Scott	(England) Mrs J L C Cox	10-8 9-1 3-9 9-5
(England) Miss Pat Cowney	(England) Miss P A Morse	9-0 9-2 9-0
(England) Mrs Violet St Clair Morford	(England) Mrs W D Porter	9-3 2-9 9-5 9-3
(England) Mrs V Leakey	(England) Miss Valerie Cooper	9-4 9-2 9-7
(Wales) Miss Rachel Byrne	(Belgium) Miss Nelly Glamonna	9-2 9-0 9-0
(England) Mrs H Bleasby	(Belgium) Mrs Ginette Germaine	9-0 9-6 9-1
(England) Miss D Salter	(England) Miss D Castle	7-9 9-3 9-5 9-5
(England) Mrs H J Stribling	(Belgium) Mrs G Pottier	9-1 9-6 9-4
(England) Mrs Margaret Dawnay	(England) Miss J M Broad	9-0 9-6 7-9 9-5
(England) Miss Carroll de Courcy-Hamilton	(Belgium) Mrs Lulu Boon	9-6 10-9 9-3
(England) Miss Meg Buxton-Knight	(England) Miss Sheila Speight	9-0 9-3 0-9 6-2 ret
(England) Mrs D F Morgan	(England) Miss K Abbott	9-7 9-3 9-7
(England) Miss V Ord	(Belgium) Mrs E Van der Elst	9-4 9-5 10-8
(England) Mrs R Rathbone	(England) Mrs J Price	4-9 10-8 9-5 9-6
(England) Miss H A Downey	(England) Mrs A F B Standfast	w/o
(England) Rosemary Walsh	(England) Miss Katherine Keith-Steele	9-4 9-0 9-3
(England) Miss K A M Steele	(England) Miss S C Palmer	9-4 9-5 10-8
(Wales) Miss G James	(England) Miss M A Travers	3-9 9-5 5-9 9-2 10-8

=== Second round ===
Player one	Player two	Score
(England) Curry	(England) Palmer	9-4 9-3 9-5
(England) J Morgan	(England) Hall	9-1 9-3 9-6
(England) Teague	(England) Salter	9-0 9-4 9-3
(England) Carlisle	(England) Stribling	9-4 9-1 9-2
(England) Harris	(England) Dawnay	9-6 9-5 10-8
(Belgium) De Borman	(England) de Courcy-Hamilton	9-4 9-3 9-0
(England) Hilton	(England) Buxton-Knight	9-1 9-1 4-9 9-3
(England) Cooke	(England) D F Morgan	9-2 9-4 9-1
(England) Dawson-Scott	(England) Ord	9-5 9-3 9-4
(England) Cowney	(England) Rathbone	5-9 9-3 6-9 5 9-6
(England) St Clair Morford	(England) Dawney	1-9 9-5 9-2 5-9 9-5
(England) Piper	(England) Howard	9-4 9-1 9-2
(England) Leakey	(England) Walsh	9-3 9-3 10-8
(Wales) Byrne	(England) Steele	9-2 9-6 9-2
(England) Magniac	(England) Sutherland	9-6 9-3 9-3
(England) Bleasby	(Wales) James	4-9 9-2 3-9 9-1 9-4

=== Third round ===
Player one	Player two	Score
(England) Curry	(England) Magniac	9-2 9-7 9-5
(England) Morgan	(England) Piper	9-1 10-8 6-9 9-1
(England) Teague	(Wales) Byrne	9-0 9-4 9-1
(England) Carlisle	(England) Dawson-Scott	9-0 9-3 9-5
(England) Hilton	(England) Harris	9-2 9-4 9-2
(Belgium) De Borman	(England) Cowmey	10-8 9-7 9-9
(England) Bleasby	(England) Leakey	9-3 9-3 1-9 5-9 9-5
(England) Cooke	(England) St Clair-Morford	9-2 9-2 9-2

=== Quarter-finals ===
Player one	Player two	Score
(England) Morgan	(England) Hilton	9-1 9-0 7-9 9-2
(England) Curry	(England) Cooke	3-9 9-1 9-2 9-3
(England) Teague	(England) Bleasby	9-5 9-2 9-1
(England) Carlisle	(Belgium) De Borman	9-7 9-2 9-5

=== Semi-finals ===
Player one	Player two	Score
(England) Morgan	(England) Teague	9-1 7-9 9-6 9-1
(England) Curry	(England) Carlisle	9-2 9-3 9-4

=== Final ===
Player one	Player two	Score
(England) Curry	(England) Morgan	9-5 9-0 9-10 6-9 10-8

Preceded by 1947	British Open Squash Championships; England (London); 1948	Succeeded by 1949
