= 1955 Women's British Open Squash Championship =

British Open Squash Championships
- 27th Women's British Open Championships

Details
- Location: London, England
- Venue: Lansdowne Club

The 1955 Ladies Open Championships was held at the Lansdowne Club in London from 7–12 December 1954.
Janet Morgan won her sixth consecutive title defeating Ruth Turner in the final. The competition was held during December 1954 but formed part of the 1954/1955 season.

== Seeds ==
1. (England) Janet Morgan

(England) M E Gowthorpe
(England) Ruth Turner
(Wales) Rachel Byrne
(England) Rosemary Walsh
(South Africa) V Lowe
(Wales) Audrey Bates

(England) Marjorie Townsend

== Draw and results ==
=== First round ===
| Player one | Player two | Score |
|---|---|---|
| (South Africa) V Lowe * | (England) Barbara Knapp | 9-5 9-4 8-10 9-5 |
| (England) P Chalk | (England) Capt M U Walker | 9-3 9-0 9-3 |
| (Australia) Judith Tissot | (England) J B Watson | 9-5 9-4 9-3 |
| (England) E Wilson | (England) A E Cox | w/o |
| (England) D C Herman | (England) W Peile | 9-1 9-1 9-4 |
| (Wales) Margaret Morgan | (England) P M Smith | 9-3 9-7 9-2 |
| (England) J P Marshall | (England) V J Mercer | 9-4 9-3 9-0 |
| (England) B A Powell | (England) Major Daphne Portway | 10-8 9-4 5-9 9-4 |
| (England) Ann Mitham | (England) G Riggall | 2-9 5-9 9-6 9-3 9-0 |
| (England) J Covell | (Wales) Audrey Bates* | w/o |

denotes seed *

=== Second round ===
| Player one | Player two | Score |
|---|---|---|
| (England) Janet Morgan * | (England) J Dannatt | 9-2 9-2 9-0 |
| (England) Ruth Turner * | (England) E J Boggis | 9-5 9-0 9-0 |
| (England) Rosemary Walsh * | (England) A Dudley-Smith | 9-3 9-2 9-1 |
| (South Africa) Miss V Lowe * | (Wales) Margaret Morgan | 6-9 10-8 7-9 8-10 |
| (England) M E Gowthorpe * | (England) Marion Craig-Smith | 9-2 9-1 10-8 |
| (Wales) Rachel Byrne* | (England) H Bleasby | 9-5 9-3 9-3 |
| (England) P Chalk | (England) K A Abbott | 9-3 4-9 9-6 3-9 9-1 |
| (England) Jennifer Pendered | (England) R Nagle | 10-9 9-10 9-1 9-5 |
| (England) R B Hawkey | (England) M A Young | w/o |
| (Australia) Judith Tissot | (England) J P Marshall | 9-3 9-5 9-1 |
| (England) V A Moore | (England) B A Powell | 9-3 9-6 2-9 5-9 9-7 |
| (England) E Wilson | (England) Ann Mitham | 7-9 3-9 9-1 9-6 9-3 |
| (Wales) M M Hazell | (England) S Peskett | 9-1 9-1 9-0 |
| (England) E I Mostyn | (England) J M Hall | 9-5 9-3 9-6 |
| (England) D C Herman | (England) J Covell | 9-0 9-1 9-6 |
| (England) Marjorie Townsend | (England) V J Foster | 9-3 9-1 9-0 |

=== Third round ===
| Player one | Player two | Score |
|---|---|---|
| (England) Morgan J | (England) Mostyn | 9-1 9-2 9-1 |
| (England) Turner | (England) Pendered | 9-5 7-9 9-4 10-8 |
| (England) Walsh | (England) Chalk | 9-2 9-2 9-4 |
| (England) Gowthorpe | (Wales) Hazell | 9-0 9-2 9-4 |
| (Wales) Byrne | (England) Moore | 9-2 9-0 9-4 |
| (England) Townsend | (England) Hawkey | 9-0 9-2 9-0 |
| (Australia) Tissot | (Wales) Morgan M | 6-9 9-5 9-7 9-5 |
| (England) Herman | (England) Wilson | 9-0 9-2 9-4 |

=== Quarter-finals ===
| Player one | Player two | Score |
|---|---|---|
| (England) Morgan | (England) Townsend | 9-3 9-0 9-7 |
| (England) Turner | (England) Gowthorpe | 9-5 9-2 9-3 |
| (Wales) Byrne | (Australia) Tissot | 10-9 4-9 7-9 9-5 9-5 |
| (England) Walsh | (England) Herman | 9-0 9-2 9-6 |

=== Semi-finals ===
| Player one | Player two | Score |
|---|---|---|
| (England) Morgan | (England) Walsh | 9-4 9-2 9-7 |
| (England) Turner | (Wales) Byrne | 7-9 9-4 9-2 10-9 |

=== Final ===
| Player one | Player two | Score |
|---|---|---|
| (England) Morgan | (England) Curry | 9-1 2-9 9-3 9-4 |

| Preceded by 1954 | British Open Squash Championships; England (London); 1955 | Succeeded by 1956 |
