= 1939 Women's British Open Squash Championship =

British Open Squash Championships
- 18th Women's British Open Championships

Details
- Location: London, England
- Venue: Queen's Club, West Kensington

The 1939 Ladies Open Championships was held at the Queen's Club, West Kensington in London from 28 February – 6 March 1939.
Margot Lumb won her fifth consecutive title by defeating Susan Noel in the final. Due to the outbreak of World War II, Margot Lumb was unable to defend her title and missed the opportunity to increase her number of victories over the next seven years.

== Seeds ==
(England) Miss Margot Lumb

(England) Hon Miss Anne Lytton-Milbanke
(England) Miss Susan Noel
(England) Miss Betty Cooke
(United States) Miss Eleonora Sears
(United States) Miss Elizabeth Pearson
(United States) Miss Ann Page

(United States) Mrs Barbara Williams

== Draw and results ==
=== First round ===
Player One	Player Two	Score
(England) Miss Margot Lumb +	(England) Miss D C Wilcox	9–0 9–2 9–0
(England) Miss F J Russell	(England) Miss A Maclagan	w/o
(England) Miss M Riddell	(England) Miss N L Kelman	5–9 9–3 9–6 9–3
(England) Miss M Johnson Taylor	(England) Miss Berenice Lumb	9–7 0–9 4–9 9–3 9–7
(United States) Miss Helen Stone	(England) Mrs E G Chalmers	9–0 9–2 9–0
(England) Miss Valerie Dalton-White	(England) Mrs D Whitehorn	9–3 9–1 9–6
(United States) Miss Barbara Williams +	(England) Mrs I A Knox	9–4 7–9 9–0 9–4
(United States) Miss Elizabeth Pearson +	(England) Miss M H Palmer	9–6 9–6 4–9 9–6
(England) Miss F Berrill	(England) Miss P L Hervey	4–9 1–9 9–7 9–3 9–6
(England) Miss Elizabeth Knox	(England) Mrs Violet St Clair Morford	9–0 9–5 9–1
(England) Mrs W D Porter	(England) Miss Ursula Foljambe	9–0 4–9 1–9 9–2 10–8
(England) Miss E M Walker	(England) Mrs E M Jarrett	6–9 9–5 9–4 9–3
(England) Miss E B Sandercock	(England) Mrs F M Traill	9–4 9–6 9–6
(England) Lady Katharine Cairns	(England) Mrs Judith Backhouse	9–0 9–3 ret
(England) Hon Miss Anne Lytton-Milbanke +	(England) Mrs Olga MacInnes	9–0 9–0 9–1
(England) Mrs A H Luttrell	(England) Miss Betty Cooke +	w/o
(United States) Miss Margaret Bostwick	(England) Mrs H Langman	9–4 9–5 9–4
(England) Miss Elizabeth Glascock	(England) Miss L Prest	w/o
(England) Miss Joan Marquis	(England) Miss S Toyne	9–4 9–0 9–4
(England) Miss J Howard	(England) Mrs D M Sinclair	10–8 9–4 9–7
(United States) Miss Frieda Scharman	(England) Miss Marianne Toyne	9–4 10–8 9–2
(United States) Miss Anne Page +	(England) Miss M Murdoch	9–0 9–5 9–0
(England) Mrs A Vickers	(England) Miss W Peile	9–5 9–1 4–9 9–4
(England) Miss E M Browning	(England) Miss B J Blanks	w/o
(England) Mrs Margaret Dawnay	(England) Miss A H Baker	9–4 9–2 9–0
(England) Miss T King	(England) Miss B E M Brett	9–4 9–7 7–9 9–7
(United States) Miss Eleonora Sears +	(England) Miss Marjorie Raphael	9–5 8–10 7–9 9–5 9–5
(England) Mrs E P Sewell	(England) Mrs Penelope Durlac	9–2 10–8 9–4
(England) Mrs R C Riseley	(England) Miss I D Edwards	9–1 9–1 2–9 5–9 9–2
(England) Miss R Berens	(England) Miss S C Palmer	9–3 7–9 1–9 9–2 10–8
(England) Miss Margaret Trehearne	(England) Miss Elizabeth Manson Bahr	9–1 9–2 9–5
(England) Miss Susan Noel +	(England) Mrs H J Stribling	9–1 9–2 9–3

+ denotes seed

=== Second round ===
Player One	Player Two	Score
(England) Lumb	(England) Russell	9–4 9–5 9–2
(England) Dalton-White	(United States) B Williams	9–1 7–9 9–3 9–0
(United States) Pearson	(England) Berrill	9–5 9–1 9–2
(England) Lytton-M	(England) Cairns	9–1 9–5 3–9 2–9 9–6
(United States) Page	(England) King	7–9 9–5 9–2 9–7
(England) Vickers	(United States) Sears	9–7 7–9 9–1 5–9 9–1
(England) Noel	(England) Trehearne	9–1 9–7 6–9 9–6
(England) Knox	(England) Porter	9–1 9–4 9–5
(England) Walker	(England) Sandercock	9–4 9–2 5–9 9–0
(England) Berens	(England) Riseley	9–5 9–2 9–4
(England) Sewell	(England) Browning	9–2 9–2 9–0
(England) Howard	(United States) Scharman	9–7 9–4 9–2
(England) Glascock	(England) Marquis	9–5 9–1 9–3
(United States) Bostwick	(England) Luttrell	9–7 9–1 9–0
(England) Dawnay	(England) Riddell	9–0 9–4 9–1
(England) Johnson–Taylor	(United States) Stone	9–3 9–7 7–9 9–4

=== Third round ===
Player One	Player Two	Score
(England) Lumb	(England) Dawnay	9–3 9–4 9–1
(England) Dalton–White	(England) Johnson-Taylor	6–9 9–4 6–9 9–0 9–3
(England) Knox	(United States) Pearson	9–4 4–9 9–6 9–5
(England) Lytton-M	(England) Walker	9–0 9–3 9–1
(England) Glascock	(United States) Bostwick	9–3 4–9 9–5 9–4
(United States) Page	(England) Howard	9–1 9–3 9–5
(England) Sewell	(England) Vickers	10–8 10–9 4–9 9–4
(England) Noel	(England) Berrens	9–0 9–3 9–3

=== Quarter-finals ===
Player One	Player Two	Score
(England) Lumb	(England) Dalton-White	9–6 9–5 9–0
(England) Lytton–M	(England) Knox	4–9 5–9 9–2 9–6 9–0
(United States) Page	(England) Glascock	10–9 9–3 4–9 9–6
(England) Noel	(England) Sewell	9–0 9–0 9–3

=== Semi-finals ===
Player One	Player Two	Score
(England) Lumb	(England) Lytton-M	9–6 5–9 9–5 9–2
(England) Noel	(United States) Page	9–0 9–4 9–2

=== Final ===
Player One	Player Two	Score
(England) Lumb	(England) Noel	9–6 9–1 9–7

Preceded by 1938	British Open Squash Championships; England (London); 1939	Succeeded by 1947
