= Sheila Macintosh =

English squash player

Sheila Macintosh (née Speight) is an English squash player who won the British Open in 1960. She was also the runner-up at the championship in 1954, 1956, 1957, 1958 and in 1959.

Besides winning the British Open, she also won the Massachusetts Women's Hardball Championships in 1959 and 1963.
