= 1966 Women's British Open Squash Championship =

British Open Squash Championships
- 38th Women's British Open Championships

Details
- Location: London, England
- Venue: Lansdowne Club and Royal Aero Club

The 1966 Women's Open Squash Championships was held at the Lansdowne Club and Royal Aero Club in London from 13–18 February 1966.Heather McKay (née Blundell) won her fifth consecutive title defeating Anna Craven-Smith in a repeat of the 1965 final.

== Seeds ==
1. (Australia) Heather McKay
2. (England) Anna Craven-Smith
3. (Australia) Jenny Irving
4. (England) Fran Marshall
5. (Australia) Bev Johnson
6. (England) Sheila Macintosh
7. (England) Ann Price
8. (Australia) Margaret Burke

== Draw and results ==
=== First round ===
Player one	Player two	Score
(Australia) Jenny Irving	(England) Valerie Watson	9-0 9-4 9-1
(England) Fran Marshall	(England) Sheila Cooper	9-0 9-0 9-0
(Australia) Bev Johnson	(England) Janet Ledger	9-1 9-2 9-0
(England) Sheila Macintosh (née Speight)	(England) S Broadway	9-1 9-1 9-4
(England) Ann Price	(England) M R Broughton	9-0 9-0 9-3
(Australia) Margaret Burke	(England) M Makower	9-3 9-0 9-0
(England) Diane Corbett	(England) J Hall	9-3 9-3 9-0
(England) Barbara McMullen	(England) Marjorie Townsend	9-1 9-7 10-9
(Scotland) Brenda Carmichael	(England) Lorna Greville-Collins	9-2 9-2 9-3
(England) Judy Wright	(England) B Savage	9-3 9-1 9-2
(England) Jean Wilson	(England) Bobs Whitehead	2-9 9-5 9-3 9-3
(England) Claire Chapman	(Scotland) F M Roulston	9-1 9-1 9-2
(England) June Swindell	(England) R Cooper	w/o
(England) Peggy Mason	(England) S Foss	9-1 9-0 9-0
(England) M A Young	(Australia) C Gillies	9-7 9-1 9-6
(England) S M Holmes	(Northern Ireland) Barbara Sanderson	10-8 10-8 6-9 9-6
(New Zealand) Alisa Tietjens	(England) Daphne Portway	9-1 9-2 10-8
(England) J Dixon	(England) A S Williams	10-8 9-4 4-9 9-1
(England) L Manning	(England) P Edwards	9-5 9-5 9-0
(England) C R Bourdon	(England) P Pratt	7-9 8-10 9-5 9-5 9-7
(England) M Taylor	(England) J Turner	9-4 8-10 9-6 8-10 9-7
(England) Di Fuller	(England) S M Atherden	9-0 9-5 9-1
(England) D Bramfit	(England) Soraya Haye	w/o
(England) Joy Alexander	(England) M J Bassett	9-0 9-1 9-1
(England) S Lancaster	(England) S S Youatt	9-4 7-9 9-1 9-2
(England) M Alan	(England) T Masters	w/o
(Australia) Heather McKay (née Blundell)		bye
(England) Anna Craven-Smith		bye
(England) A Norval		bye
(England) K J Dempsey		bye
(Australia) Celeste Dickson		bye
(England) J Danks		bye

=== Second round ===
Player one	Player two	Score
(Australia) McKay	(England) Norval	9-1 9-0 9-1
(England) Craven-Smith	(England) Dempsey	9-0 9-1 9-0
(Australia) Irving	(England) Mason	9-0 9-4 9-1
(England) Marshall	(England) Young	9-0 9-1 9-0
(Australia) Johnson	(England) Holmes	9-1 9-1 9-1
(England) Macintosh	(New Zealand) Tietjens	9-3 9-2 9-2
(Australia) Burke	(England) Dixon	9-0 9-2 9-5
(England) Price	(England) Manning	10-9 9-3 9-2
(England) Corbett	(Australia) Dickson	9-4 9-2 9-0
(England) McMullen	(England) Bourdon	9-3 9-1 9-0
(Scotland) Carmichael	(England) Taylor	9-3 9-1 9-0
(England) Wright	(England) Fuller	10-8 9-1 2-9 9-2
(England) Wilson	(England) Bramfit	9-0 9-0 9-2
(England) Chapman	(England) Alexander	9-6 9-2 9-2
(England) Swindell	(England) Lancaster	0-9 4-9 9-0 9-3 9-6
(England) Danks	(England) Alan	9-3 ret

=== Third round ===
Player one	Player two	Score
(Australia) McKay	(England) Corbett	9-0 9-2 9-0
(England) Craven-Smith	(England) Danks	9-1 9-0 9-2
(England) Marshall	(England) Wright	9-2 9-1 9-3
(Australia) Irving	(England) Wilson	9-3 9-7 9-4
(England) Macintosh	(England) Swindell	9-1 9-2 9-1
(Australia) Johnson	(England) McMullen	9-4 7-9 9-5 9-1
(Australia) Burke	(Scotland) Carmichael	9-6-9-4 9-1
(England) Price	(England) Chapman	9-6 9-6 1-9 9-4

=== Quarter-finals ===
Player one	Player two	Score
(Australia) McKay	(Australia) Johnson	9-0 9-1 9-2
(England) Craven-Smith	(England) Macintosh	9-5 8-10 9-1 9-0
(England) Marshall	(Australia) Burke	9-2 5-9 9-3 9-0
(Australia) Irving	(England) Price	9-1 9-2 9-2

=== Semi-finals ===
Player one	Player two	Score
(Australia) McKay	(England) Marshall	9-6 9-5 9-1
(England) Craven-Smith	(Australia) Irving	9-5 9-4 9-2

=== Final ===
Player one	Player two	Score
(Australia) McKay	(England) Craven-Smith	9-0 9-0 10-8

Preceded by 1965	British Open Squash Championships; England (London); 1966	Succeeded by 1967
