= 1972 Women's British Open Squash Championship =

British Open Squash Championships
- 44th Women's British Open Championships

Details
- Location: London, England
- Venue: BP Club, Lower Sydenham

The 1972 Women's Open Squash Championships was held at the BP Club in Lower Sydenham, London from 4–9 March 1972.Heather McKay (née Blundell) won her eleventh consecutive title defeating Kathy Malan in the final. This surpassed the previous record of ten wins set by Janet Morgan from 1950 through to 1959.

== Seeds ==
1. (Australia) Heather McKay (née Blundell)
2. (South Africa) Kathy Malan
3. (England) Fran Marshall
4. (England) Jean Wilson
5. (England) Claire Chapman
6. (Australia) Margaret Claughton
7. (England) Jane Barham
8. (England) Janice Wainwright (née Townsend)

== Draw and results ==
=== First round ===
| Player one | Player two | Score |
|---|---|---|
| (Australia) Mrs Heather McKay (née Blundell) | (England) Mrs Ann Jee | 9-0 9-0 9–0 |
| (South Africa) Miss Kathy Malan | (England) Miss Ann Price | 9-0 9-0 9–0 |
| (England) Mrs V Power | (Australia) J O'Neill | 9-1 9-1 9–1 |
| (New Zealand) Miss Teresa Lawes | (England) Mrs C R Bourdon | 9-0 9-1 9–4 |
| (England) Miss Jean Wilson | (England) Miss Karen Gardner | |
| (England) Miss M Brodie | (Netherlands) Ada Bakker | |
| (England) Mrs Fran Marshall | | |
| (England) Mrs Claire Chapman | | |
| (Australia) Mrs Margaret Claughton | | |
| (England) Miss Jane Barham | | |
| (England) Mrs Janice Wainwright (née Townsend) | | |
| (England) Miss Sue Cogswell | | |
| (England) Mrs Dianne Corbett | | |
| (Scotland) Miss Brenda Carmichael | | |
| (England) Mrs Alex Cowie | | |
| (England) Mrs Ruth Turner | | |
| (England) Mrs Sheila Macintosh (née Speight) | | |
| (Sweden) Miss Heather Rhead | | |
| (Republic of Ireland) Mrs Barbara Sanderson | | |
| (England) Mrs Valerie Watson | | |
| (England) Miss Theo Veltman | | |
| (Scotland) Mrs Irene Rowe | | |
| (England) Mrs Jean Reynolds (née McFarlane) | | |
| (England) Mrs Marjorie Townsend | | |
| (England) Mrs Sue Pexman | | |
| (England) Miss Kathy Brabin | | |
| (England) Mrs Maureen Morgan | | |
| (England) Mrs Bobs Whitehead | | |
| (England) Mrs M James | | |
| (England) Miss Janet Ledger | | |
| (England) Mrs Di Fuller | | |
| (England) Miss B Dinsmore | | |

=== Second round ===
| Player one | Player two | Score |
|---|---|---|
| (Australia) McKay | (New Zealand) Lawes | 9-2 9-0 9–0 |
| (England) Marshall | (Sweden) Rhead | 9-10 9-1 9-4 9–7 |
| (Australia) Claughton | (Republic of Ireland) Sanderson | 9-10 9-10 9-3 9-2 9–0 |
| (England) Wainwright | (England) Watson | 9-6 10-8 9-10 1-9 9–4 |
| (England) Wilson | (England) Veltman | 9-6 9-0 9–6 |
| (England) Cogswell | (England) Brodie | 9-4 9-3 9–5 |
| (England) Cowie | (England) Reynolds | 6-9 9-2 9-4 9–7 |
| (England) Chapman | (England) Townsend | 9-1 9-1 9–1 |
| (England) Corbett | (England) Pexman | 9-4 9-7 9–0 |
| (South Africa) Malan | (England) Brabin | 9-0 9-0 9–2 |
| (Scotland) Carmichael | (England) Morgan | 9-6 3-9 9-5 9–5 |
| (England) Barham | (England) Whitehead | 9-3 9-3 9–5 |
| (England) Turner | (England) James | 7-9 10-8 9-6 9–4 |
| (England) Macintosh | (England) Ledger | 9-3 9-6 9–5 |
| (England) Power | (England) Fuller | 10-8 9-6 9–7 |
| (Scotland) Rowe | (England) Dinsmore | 9-1 9-4 9–5 |

=== Third round ===
| Player one | Player two | Score |
|---|---|---|
| (Australia) McKay | (Scotland) Rowe | 9-0 9-0 9–1 |
| (England) Marshall | (England) Cogswell | 9-1 9-1 9–2 |
| (South Africa) Malan | (England) Power | 9-1 9-0 9–1 |
| (England) Wilson | (England) Cowie | 9-0 9-3 10–9 |
| (England) Chapman | (England) Macintosh | 9-3 9-2 9–0 |
| (England) Barham | (England) Turner | 9-0 9-3 9-10 9–3 |
| (England) Corbett | (Australia) Claughton | 7-9 9-7 9-3 9–1 |
| (England) Wainwright | (Scotland) Carmichael | 9-10 9-2 9-1 3-9 9–0 |

=== Quarter-finals ===
| Player one | Player two | Score |
|---|---|---|
| (Australia) McKay | (England) Chapman | 9-1 9-0 9–0 |
| (England) Wilson | (England) Barham | 4-9 9-6 9-7 9–4 |
| (South Africa) Malan | (England) Corbett | 9-7 9-4 9–1 |
| (England) Marshall | (England) Wainwright | 10-8 9-4 9–2 |

=== Semi-finals ===
| Player one | Player two | Score |
|---|---|---|
| (Australia) McKay | (England) Marshall | 9-1 9-1 9–3 |
| (South Africa) Malan | (England) Wilson | 8-10 9-6 9-6 9–6 |

=== Final ===
| Player one | Player two | Score |
|---|---|---|
| (Australia) McKay | (South Africa) Malan | 9-1 9-1 9–2 |

| Preceded by 1971 | British Open Squash Championships; England (London); 1972 | Succeeded by 1973 |
