= 1963 Women's British Open Squash Championship =

British Open Squash Championships
- 35th Women's British Open Championships

Details
- Location: London, England
- Venue: Lansdowne Club and Royal Aero Club

The 1963 Women's Open Squash Championships was held at the Lansdowne Club and Royal Aero Club in London from 1–7 December 1962.Heather Blundell won her second title defeating Fran Marshall in a repeat of the 1962 final. The championships were held in December 1962 which formed part of the 1962/1963 season so is classed as the 1963 edition.

== Seeds ==
1. (Australia) Heather Blundell
2. (England) Fran Marshall
3. (England) Claire Hargreaves
4. (England) Pauline White
5. (England) Anna Craven-Smith
6. (England) Bobs Whitehead
7. (England) Sheila Macintosh
8. (England) Jennifer Crane

== Draw and results ==
=== First round ===
Player one	Player two	Score
(Scotland) Brenda Carmichael	(England) J M Mallen	9-1 9-3 9-2
(Wales) Jill Campion	(England) S P Y Whitby	w/o
(England) B J Holt	(England) N A Watkins	w/o
(England) Bobs Whitehead	(England) Jennifer Crane	w/o
(England) Marjorie Townsend	(England) Ann Price	9-4 9-10 6-9 9-4 9-7
(England) M Taylor	(England) P Gimson	w/o
(England) J E A Lanning	(England) S G Youatt	9-1 7-9 9-4 5-9 9-0
(England) Ruth Turner	(England) Annette Picton	w/o
(England) Sheila Ervin	(England) K Maltby	9-0 6-9 9-4 9-0
(England) A Norval	(Wales) C E Harrison	9-2 9-1 9-2
(England) Mary Muncaster	(England) Peggy Mason	9-0 9-0 9-0
(England) M Ashmore	(Australia) H M Sedman	9-3 9-4 9-4
(England) R Cooper	(England) D Escott	w/o
(England) Daphne Portway	(England) D M Holman	w/o

=== Second round ===
Player one	Player two	Score
(Australia) Heather Blundell	(England) Barbara Wheen	9-0 9-0 9-1
(England) Fran Marshall	(England) J F Leslie	9-2 9-4 9-1
(England) Anna Craven-Smith	(England) Di Fuller	9-2 9-3 9-2
(England) Pauline White	(England) A M Backhouse	9-4 9-3 9-2
(England) Claire Hargreaves	(England) Daphne Portway	9-3 9-0 9-1
(England) Sheila Macintosh (née Speight)	(Scotland) Brenda Carmichael	8-10 9-1 9-3 9-0
(England) Bobs Whitehead	(England) Marjorie Townsend	9-3 9-5 9-5
(England) Ruth Turner	(England) Sheila Ervin	9-4 9-4 4-9 9-6
(England) D W Courtney	(England) H E S Hutchins	9-2 9-4 9-6
(England) R Cooper	(England) M Ashmore	9-0 9-3 9-0
(England) J C Hodson	(England) J Banks	4-9 3-8 3-8 ret
(England) K J Dempsey	(England) D E A Wright	w/o
(England) Mary Muncaster	(England) A Norval	4-9 9-2 9-7 9-3
(England) J E A Lanning	(England) M Taylor	10-8 10-8 9-3
(England) R B Hawkey	(England) J Arckedekne-Butler	9-0 9-0 9-0
(Wales) Jill Campion	(England) B J Holt	9-0 9-0 9-2

=== Third round ===
Player one	Player two	Score
(England) Marshall	(England) Dempsey	9-1 9-1 9-0
(England) Macintosh	(Wales) Campion	9-1 9-1 9-7
(England) Muncaster	(England) Turner	9-7 9-3 9-7
(Australia) Blundell	(England) Hodson	9-0 9-0 9-1
(England) White	(England) Hawkey	9-4 9-0 9-5
(England) Whitehead	(England) Lanning	9-3 9-5 9-0
(England) Hargreaves	(England) Cooper	9-1 9-2 9-2
(England) Craven-Smith	(England) Courtney	9-6 9-4 9-3

=== Quarter-finals ===
Player one	Player two	Score
(England) Marshall	(England) White	9-3 9-8 9-1
(England) Macintosh	(England) Whitehead	9-4 9-7 9-6
(England) Muncaster	(England) Hargreaves	9-2 9-5 3-9 7-9 9-5
(Australia) Blundell	(England) Craven-Smith	9-4 9-1 9-2

=== Semi-finals ===
Player one	Player two	Score
(Australia) Blundell	(England) Muncaster	9-6 9-2 9-6
(England) Marshall	(England) Macintosh	9-5 9-4 9-5

=== Final ===
Player one	Player two	Score
(Australia) Blundell	(England) Marshall	9-4 9-2 9-6

Preceded by 1962	British Open Squash Championships; England (London); 1963	Succeeded by 1964
