= Wheelchair racquetball classification =

Disability sport classification system

Disability racquetball classification is the medical based classification system developed to allow fair competition between racquetball players with different disability types and against able-bodied competitors. Internationally and in Canada, this classification system only allows only wheelchair users to be eligible to compete. In contrast, the United States classification system covers wheelchair users and people with vision impairments, with different classes inside these disability types.

Internationally, the sport is governed by the International Racquetball Federation, with national governing bodies also dealing with classification including the United States Racquetball Association and Racquetball Canada. Rules for the sport were developed by the 1980s, and integration with the able-bodied side occurred by 1990 when able-bodied and wheelchair competitors competed in the same world championships. Inclusion was challenged in a court in United States in 1995. While the sport was never a full Paralympic one, it was a demonstration sport at the 1996 Summer Paralympics.

Classification is handled by the IRF Committee for Athletes with Disabilities who have the ability to screen or rescreen competitors for inclusion in the classification at their discretion. There are rule modifications that differ for wheelchair users and vision impaired users.

== Definition ==
Classification systems for disability sport were designed to allow fair levels of competition for competitors with different types of disability, with the sport utilising a medical classification system. Competitors with ambulatory disabilities are able to compete against their able-bodied counterparts as a result of classification. Internationally and in Canada, there is one classification eligible for participation: wheelchair users. They must have a permanent disability that requires them to use a wheelchair, and may not be able to compete using rules for able-bodied players because of their disability. In Canada, there have been different classes of competition inside wheelchair racquetball, with A and B at the 1989 Canadian Racquetball Championships.

For racquetball in the United States, wheelchair and vision impairment racquetball are both recognised with their own classification. For players with vision impairments, three classes exist: B1, B2 and B3. B1 allows for competitors who are totally blind or having some light perception, while B2 allows for competitors with vision range that allows them to recognise hand movement to 20/600 corrected, and B3 allows for competitors with vision impairments from 20/600 to 20/200 corrected. Deaf racquetball has also been organised in the United States, with players being eligible if their hearing loss is 55 db or greater and sorted into divisions based on ability, age and gender.

== Governance ==
Globally, two organisations were involved with governing the sport during the 1990s. They included the International Stoke Mandeville Wheelchair Sports Federation (ISMWSF)'s Racquetball Di-vision and the Committee for Athletes with Disabilities – International Racquetball Federation (IRF). Subsequently, the International Racquetball Federation has taken over the governance of the sport internationally, but only in terms of wheelchair racquetball and only recognising one classification.

A set of wheelchair racquetball rules have been endorsed and are included in the official racquetball rules published by the United States Racquetball Association. These rules are included in the same ruleset used by able-bodied competitors. American Amateur Racquetball Association has also developed and governs a classification system that was used in the 1990s. The National Wheelchair Racquetball Association, who existed by 1985, was overseen by the AARA in the 1990s. National Racquetball Association of the Deaf is the governing body for deaf racquetball in the United States, and is based around rules set out by the United States Racquetball Association.

In Canada, classification is handled by Racquetball Canada, where they recognise one wheelchair class and no vision impairment classes. The organisation has been involved with wheelchair players since the 1980s. Racquetball Ireland makes no provisions for intellectual disabilities, wheelchair users, deaf and vision impaired people in their September 2011 rules, and England Squash and Racketball is the same for their rules dated April 2009.

== History ==
Rules for the sport date back to the 1980s. In 1985, the Canadian national championships were integrated, including both non-disabled and disabled athletes in the same event. In 1990, the sport became the first one to integrate the world championships for non-disabled competitors with disabled competitors. During the 1990s, racquetball was one of the sports that people with disabilities were most likely to play. In the United States in 1995, a wheelchair user brought suit against a racquetball league after he was unable to compete against top level players with a modified two bounce rule, citing the Americans With Disabilities Act and alleging a violation of Title III of the law. The court ruled in the favour of the league, citing that the rule modification for a wheelchair user would fundamentally change the rules of the game. Classification for wheelchair sport on the Paralympic level was being organised by the ISMWSF and included all types of wheelchair users. Despite these changes to sport governance, racquetball has never been included on the Paralympic programme as a full medal sport, though it was a demonstration sport at the 1996 Summer Paralympics.

== Process, rules and equipment ==
Classification is handled by the IRF Committee for Athletes with Disabilities who have the ability to screen or rescreen competitors for inclusion in the classification at their discretion.

The standard rules for racquetball are generally used, with some exceptions for wheelchair users. The ball is allowed to bounce twice except in the division that allows more than two bounces. The wheelchair is considered part of the body as applies to ball contact. Additional specific rules include the requirement that only the wheelchair wheels may be used to support the player: hands and feed cannot be used. The player must remain in the wheelchair at all times. The divisions that wheelchair users compete in are also different from non-disabled competitors.

There are few restrictions on the type of mobility assisting equipment used by wheelchair competitors except that it cannot interfere with the movement of the other player. Players in wheelchair classes may choose to compete with roller bars attached to their chair, or have non-marking tires positioned under their footrest.

In competitions sanctioned inside the United States, when doubles matches are being played with partners from different classes, the pair competes in the division for the higher functioning pairs partner. The rules have been modified for players with vision impairments, allowing players to attempt to hit the ball until the "ball has been touched." or "The ball has stopped bouncing." or "The ball has passed the short line after touching the back wall." The rules for deaf competitors are the same when competing against non-disabled competitors, with the deaf classification applying only for eligibility in deaf only events. The National Racquetball Association of the Deaf uses a version of the rules set out by the United States Racquetball Association.
