= 1970 Women's British Open Squash Championship =

British Open Squash Championships
- 42nd Women's British Open Championships

Details
- Location: London, England
- Venue: BP Club, Sydenham

The 1970 Women's Open Squash Championships was held at the BP Club in Sydenham, London from 13–18 February 1970.Heather McKay (née Blundell) won her ninth consecutive title defeating Marcia Roche in the final.

== Seeds ==
1. (Australia) Heather McKay
2. (England) Fran Marshall
3. (South Africa) Marcia Roche
4. (England) Claire Chapman
5. (England) Ann Price
6. (England) Jean Wilson
7. (Australia) Margaret Claughton
8. (England) Joy Alexander

== Draw and results ==
=== First round ===
Player one	Player two	Score
(Australia) Heather McKay (née Blundell)		bye
(England) Fran Marshall		bye
(South Africa) Marcia Roche	(England) O Weldon	9-7 9-1 9-0
(England) Claire Chapman	(England) T McMullen	9-5 9-2 9-3
(England) Ann Price	(Scotland) Irene Rowe	9-4 9-2 9-0
(England) Jean Wilson	(England) M D Furniss	9-3 9-2 9-7
(Australia) Margaret Claughton	(England) Mandy Holdsworth	10-8 9-1 9-2
(England) Joy Alexander	(England) Tessa Lawrence	9-1 9-4 9-1
(Australia) Thea Moore	(England) J Goodwin	9-0 9-0 9-2
(England) Di Fuller	(England) C Boswell	9-2 9-6 9-4
(England) Maureen Morgan	(England) Karen Gardner	9-4 9-3 9-4
(England) Heather Nielson	(England) Janet Ledger	5-9 9-7 10-9 9-7
(England) Pam Bleasdale	(England) E Carnegie	9-6 9-2 9-6
(Sweden) Heather Rhead	(England) H E S Wilson	9-4 9-5 9-1
(England) Peggy Mason	(England) Mary McNally	w/o
(England) Jane Poynder	(England) B Smith	10-8 9-4 3-9 9-5
(England) Jean McFarlane	(England) J Chamberlain	10-9 9-2 9-6
(England) K Maltby	(England) Gillian Finch	9-7 9-7 9-2
(Scotland) Brenda Carmichael	(England) M Broughton	9-0 9-0 9-1
(England) Jane Barham	(England) Sheila Cooper	9-6 9-3 9-3
(England) Bobs Whitehead	(England) Theo Veltman	9-2 9-2 6-9 9-1
(Wales) Jill Campion	(England) C Bourdon	9-1 9-2 9-7
(Northern Ireland) Barbara Sanderson	(England) E Thomason	9-3 9-0 9-3
(England) Diane Corbett	(England) J M Goodin	9-1 9-1 9-1
(England) Valerie Watson	(England) M Taylor	9-1 9-2 9-1
(England) Janice Townsend	(England) M Young	9-1 9-0 9-5
(England) M Moon	(Republic of Ireland) Janet Ward	9-6 9-1 4-9 9-0

=== Second round ===
Player one	Player two	Score
(England) Morgan	(England) Nielson	

=== Third round ===
Player one	Player two	Score
(Australia) McKay	(England) Townsend M	9-0 9-1 9-1
(England) Marshall	(England) Sinclair	9-0 9-0 9-1
(South Africa) Roche	(England) Morgan	9-3 9-0 9-0
(England) Chapman	(England) Corbett	9-1 9-7 9-1
(England) Wilson	(Scotland) Carmichael	9-4 5-9 9-0 9-3
(England) Price	(England) Townsend J	7-9 9-7 9-5 9-7
(Australia) Claughton	(England) Whitehead	6-9 6-9 9-9 9-3 9-1
(England) Alexander	(England) Watson	8-10 2-9 10-8 4-9

=== Quarter-finals ===
Player one	Player two	Score
(Australia) McKay	(Australia) Claughton	9-0 9-1 9-1
(South Africa) Roche	(England) Wilson	9-7 9-4 9-4
(England) Marshall	(England) Price	9-4 9-2 6-9 10-8
(England) Chapman	(England) Watson	9-3 9-2 9-1

=== Semi-finals ===
Player one	Player two	Score
(Australia) McKay	(England) Chapman	9-0 9-0 9-1
(England) Marshall	(South Africa) Roche	9-6 8-10 8-10 5-9

=== Final ===
Player one	Player two	Score
(Australia) McKay	(South Africa) Roche	9-1 9-1 9-0

Preceded by 1969	British Open Squash Championships; England (London); 1970	Succeeded by 1971
