= 1962 Women's British Open Squash Championship =

British Open Squash Championships
- 34th Women's British Open Championships

Details
- Location: London, England
- Venue: Lansdowne Club and Royal Aero Club

The 1962 Women's Open Squash Championships was held at the Lansdowne Club and Royal Aero Club in London from 18–24 February 1962. Heather Blundell won her first title defeating Fran Marshall in the final.

== Seeds ==
1. (England) Fran Marshall
2. (Australia) Heather Blundell
3. (England) Claire Hargreaves
4. (England) Pauline White

== Draw and results ==
=== First round ===
Player one	Player two	Score
(England) G A Pears	(England) M Cunneen	w/o
(England) Third-Officer S J Hogg	(England) M Ashmore	9-0 9-1 9-0
(England) Ann Price	(England) Marjorie Townsend	2-9 9-3 8-10 9-5 9-1
(England) A Norval	(England) R B Hawkey	5-9 9-1 9-5 9-0
(England) D M Holman	(England) A M Backhouse	4-9 9-4 9-2 9-2
(England) B M Horton	(England) S P Whitby	9-2 9-1 9-1
(England) Ruth Turner	(England) S G Young	9-1 9-3 9-3
(England) Jennifer Crane	(England) Daphne Portway	9-2 9-0 9-2
(England) K J Dempsey	(England) N A Watkins	9-6 9-4 9-1
(England) R Cooper	(England) Sheila Cooper	9-4 9-0 9-2

=== Second round ===
Player one	Player two	Score
(England) Fran Marshall	(England) J C Hodson	9-0 9-4 9-1
(Australia) Heather Blundell	(England) J E A Lanning	9-1 9-2 9-2
(England) Claire Hargreaves	(England) K C L Abbott	9-2 9-2 9-3
(England) Pauline White	(Wales) C E Harrison	9-4 9-1 9-4
(England) Mary Muncaster	(England) J Arckedekne-Butler	9-0 9-1 9-5
(England) Jennifer Crane	(England) K J Dempsey	9-2 10-8 9-7-9 9-3
(England) Ann Price	(England) Third Officer S J Hogg	7-9 10-8 9-0 9-3
(England) Bobs Whitehead	(Rhodesia) Miss W Courtney	9-2 9-1 9-6
(England) Barbara Wheen	(England) B J Holt	9-1 9-5 9-2
(England) D Attwood	(England) D Escott	9-5 9-3 5-9 9-4
(England) Anna Craven-Smith	(England) G A Pears	9-7 9-4 9-4
(England) Ruth Turner	(England) B M Horton	9-1 9-2 9-3
(Wales) Jill Campion	(England) J M Goodin	2-9 10-8 9-1 9-3
(England) D M Holman	(England) A Norval	9-6 10-8 9-4
(Wales) Marion Lloyd	(England) B A Thomas	9-1 9-5 9-2
(England) R Cooper	(England) M Taylor	9-3 9-1 9-0

=== Third round ===
Player one	Player two	Score
(Australia) Blundell	(Wales) Lloyd	9-0 9-4 9-3
(England) Marshall	(England) Wheen	9-1 9-1 9-1
(England) Price	(England) Holman	1-9 10-9 9-5 9-0
(England) Hargreaves	(England) Cooper	9-4 9-3 9-0
(England) Muncaster	(Wales) Campion	9-4 9-3 9-3
(England) Whitehead	(England) Attwood	9-1 9-0 9-2
(England) White	(England) Craven-Smith	1-9 9-5 5-9 9-7 10-8
(England) Crane	(England) Turner	9-4 9-5 9-3

=== Quarter-finals ===
Player one	Player two	Score
(Australia) Blundell	(England) Muncaster	9-7 9-4 9-6
(England) Marshall	(England) Whitehead	9-1 9-5 9-3
(England) Price	(England) White	w/o
(England) Hargreaves	(England) Crane	9-3 9-2 10-8

=== Semi-finals ===
Player one	Player two	Score
(Australia) Blundell	(England) Hargreaves	9-2 9-2 9-3
(England) Marshall	(England) Price	9-0 9-1 9-0

=== Final ===
Player one	Player two	Score
(Australia) Blundell	(England) Marshall	9-6 9-5 9-4

Preceded by 1961	British Open Squash Championships; England (London); 1962	Succeeded by 1963
