= 1971 Women's British Open Squash Championship =

British Open Squash Championships
- 43rd Women's British Open Championships

Details
- Location: London, England
- Venue: BP Club, Sydenham

The 1971 Women's Open Squash Championships was held at the BP Club in Sydenham, London from 19–25 February 1971.Heather McKay (née Blundell) won her tenth consecutive title defeating Jenny Irving in the final. This equalled the previous record of ten wins set by Janet Morgan from 1950 through to 1959.

== Seeds ==
1. (Australia) Heather McKay
2. (England) Fran Marshall
3. (Australia) Jenny Irving
4. (Australia) Marion Jackman
5. (England) Jean Wilson
6. (England) Claire Chapman
7. (Australia) Mavis Baker
8. (England) Pam Bleasdale

== Draw and results ==
=== First round ===
Player one	Player two	Score
(Australia) Heather McKay (née Blundell)	(England) M Shovelton	9-0 9-0 9-0
(England) Fran Marshall	(England) Jean McFarlane	w/o
(England) Claire Chapman	(England) P Goodall	9-4 9-4 9-7
(Australia) Marion Jackman	(England) Ruth Turner	9-5 9-2 9-0
(Australia) Jenny Irving	(England) E Mills	w/o
(Australia) Mavis Baker	(England) J Fowler	9-1 9-4 9-4
(England) Pam Bleasdale	(England) R Cooper	w/o
(Australia) Margaret Claughton	(England) Ann Jee	9-1 9-0 9-3
(England) Diane Corbett	(England) J Chamberlain	9-3 9-1 9-2
(Sweden) Heather Rhead	(England) Alex Cowie	9-3 9-2 9-0
(England) Janice Townsend	(South Africa) Miss A Tucker	9-3 9-2 9-1
(England) Joy Alexander	(England) V Albrow	9-0 9-0 9-0
(England) Di Fuller	(Northern Ireland) Barbara Sanderson	0-9 10-8 9-5 9-10 9-6
(England) Sheila Macintosh (née Speight)	(England) A M Backhouse	9-1 9-1 9-0
(England) Jane Poynder	(England) K Maltby	9-1 9-1 9-3
(England) M Scott-Miller	(England) R Bentley	w/o
(England) Theo Veltman	(England) Mandy Holdsworth	4-9 9-3 9-7 9-1
(England) Sheila Cooper	(England) Sheila Ervin	w/o
(Australia) Jean Walker	(England) Bobs Whitehead	9-4 9-4 10-8
(England) M James	(England) Peggy Mason	9-2 9-6 9-4
(England) M Brodie	(England) Ann Price	w/o
(England) Carol Machin	(England) J Goodin	9-3 9-1 9-5
(England) H Wilson	(England) M Moon	9-1 9-0 9-2
(England) Gillian Finch	(Scotland) Brenda Carmichael	w/o
(England) M Clements	(England) C Bevan	7-9 9-7 9-3 9-7
(South Africa) Miss Kathy Malan		
(England) J McDonald		
(England) Jane Barham		
(England) Janet Ledger		
(England) M Furniss		
(England) Karen Gardner		
(England) Jean Wilson		

=== Second round ===
Player one	Player two	Score
(Australia) McKay	(England) Fuller	9-0 9-0 9-1
(England) Marshall	(England) Macintosh	9-1 9-3 9-2
(Australia) Baker	(England) Poynder	9-0 9-0 9-7
(England) Chapman	(England) Scott-Miller	9-0 9-0 9-2
(England) Wilson J	(England) Ledger	9-3 9-0 9-8
(Australia) Jackman	(England) Furniss	9-0 9-2 9-1
(Australia) Irving	(England) Veltman	9-1 9-0 9-0
(England) Bleasdale	(England) Cooper	9-4 9-1 9-0
(Australia) Claughton	(England) Gardner	9-2 9-1 9-1
(England) Corbett	(Australia) Walker	10-8 9-2 7-9 9-6
(South Africa) Malan	(England) James	9-1 9-3 9-1
(England) McDonald	(England) Brodie	9-6 9-0 5-9 9-5
(England) Barham	(England) Machin	9-1 9-1 9-0
(Sweden) Rhead	(England) Wilson H	9-4 9-3 9-2
(England) Townsend	(England) Finch	9-4 9-1 9-4
(England) Alexander	(England) Clements	9-5 9-2 9-2

=== Third round ===
Player one	Player two	Score
(Australia) McKay	(Sweden) Rhead	9-0 9-0 9-1
(England) Marshall	(England) Corbett	9-0 9-4 9-0
(Australia) Baker	(South Africa) Malan	3-9 9-1 9-5 9-6
(England) Chapman	(England) McDonald	9-0 9-0 9-1
(England) Wilson	(England) Townsend	9-3 9-6 9-0
(Australia) Jackman	(England) Alexander	9-2 9-2 9-3
(Australia) Irving	(England) Barham	9-2 9-0 9-5
(England) Bleasdale	(Australia) Claughton	9-5 6-9 6 1-9 10-8

=== Quarter-finals ===
Player one	Player two	Score
(Australia) McKay	(England) Bleasdale	9-0 9-0 9-1
(Australia) Irving	(England) Chapman	9-0 9-0 9-1
(Australia) Jackman	(England) Wilson	9-7 9-4 9-5
(England) Marshall	(Australia) Baker	9-4 7-9 4-9 9-4 9-4

=== Semi-finals ===
Player one	Player two	Score
(Australia) McKay	(Australia) Jackman	9-7 9-0 9-4
(Australia) Irving	(England) Marshall	9-7 9-5 9-6

=== Final ===
Player one	Player two	Score
(Australia) McKay	(Australia) Irving	9-0 9-3 9-1

Preceded by 1970	British Open Squash Championships; England (London); 1971	Succeeded by 1972
