= Racquetball Canada =

National sport association

- Sport: Racquetball
- Founded: 1971
- Location: Winnipeg, Manitoba
- President: Gwen Smoluk
- CEO: Kathy Brook

Official website
- www.racquetball.ca
- (Canada)

Racquetball Canada is the national sport association (NSO) responsible for the development of racquetball athletes, coaches and officials in Canada. Founded in 1971 as the Canadian Racquetball Association (CRA), Racquetball Canada sets the Canadian standards for racquetball and works with partners to promote the growth and development of the sport across the country.

Racquetball Canada is a member of the Canadian Olympic Committee, as well as the International Racquetball Federation (IRF) and Pan American Racquetball Confederation.

== History ==
John Kempo, Howie Rankin and Ken Wilson incorporated the Canadian Racquetball Association (CRA) on April 13 1971. The CRA became a member of the Sport Federation of Canada, and in 1974 began to receive federal funding through Sport Canada. Kempo stepped down as President after three years, and was succeeded by Ivan Velan. Kempo stayed on a Legal Council and Wilson as Treasurer.

The first Canadian Championship - a "closed" event, i.e., for Canadian citizens only - was in October 1975 in Winnipeg. Wayne Bowes won Men's Open Singles, defeating Wes Hadikin in the final, 21-18, 21-10, while Monique Parent won Women's Open Singles, beating Linda Forcade in the final, 21-11, 21-12. Bowes also won Men’s Open Doubles with Bob Daku, as they defeated Hadikin and Ivan Velan in the final, 21-18, 21-19. There wasn't a Women’s Doubles division.

The CRA lobbied to have racquetball included in the Canada Games, and it successfully got racquetball accepted as an official sport for the 1979 Canada Winter Games in Brandon, Manitoba. Racquetball was also part of the 1983 and 1991 Canada Winter Games.

The Canadian Championships - known as Nationals - changed from a fall event to a spring event in 1980, when it was held in Montreal on the Victoria Day weekend. Club 230 with 17 courts hosted 468 players. Nationals continues to be held during Victoria Day week.

Canada's first international competition was the 1984 International Racquetball Federation (IRF) World Championships in Santa Clara, California, where Ross Harvey won Men's Singles. Since then Canadians have won 9 World Championships with the most recent being Coby Iwaasa’s and Samuel Murray’s title in Men’s Doubles at the 2024 World Championships.

Racquetball Canada has hosted the World Championships twice: in 1992 in Montreal and 2014 in Burlington, Ontario. Racquetball was also part of the 1999 Pan American Games in Winnipeg and the 2015 Pan American Games in Toronto. As a precursor to the 1999 Games, the 1998 Pan American Championships (then called the Tournament of the Americas) were held in Winnipeg.

== National Teams ==
Racquetball Canada funds teams that compete in the Pan American Games and the World Games, which both occur every four years, the IRF Racquetball World Championships every two years, and Pan American Racquetball Championships annually. Also, Racquetball Canada partially funds junior teams that compete in the IRF World Junior Racquetball Championships annually.

Players are selected for the national team based on a mixed criteria of results from the International Racquetball Tour and Ladies Professional Racquetball Tour and Racquetball Canada’s National Team Selection Events and National Championship.

The Racquetball Canada National Championships occurs the third week of May (Victoria Day week) with the location varying from year to year. The most recent championships were in Burlington, Ontario, May 18-24, 2025. The 2026 Nationals will also be in Burlington. The two National Team Selection Events happen in November and February.

== Hall of fame ==
Racquetball Canada created a Hall of Fame in 2016 for the purpose of recognizing individuals who have made significant achievements and contributions in racquetball.

=== Players ===
- Mike Ceresia
- Vincent Gagnon
- Josée Grand'Maître
- Mike Green
- Sherman Greenfeld
- Roger Harripersad
- Christie Huczek
- Heather McKay
- Lindsay Myers
- Kris Odegard
- Lori-Jane Powell
- Simon Roy
- Jennifer Saunders
- Heather Stupp

=== Builders ===
- Ron Brown
- Cliff Hendrickson
- John Kempo
- Jack McBride
- Gary Ness
- Howie Rankin
- Cal Smith
- Rolad Thompson
- Adrian Webb
- Ken Wilson
