= 1964 Women's British Open Squash Championship =

British Open Squash Championships
- 36th Women's British Open Championships

Details
- Location: London, England
- Venue: Lansdowne Club and Royal Aero Club

The 1964 Women's Open Squash Championships was held at the Lansdowne Club and Royal Aero Club in London from 15–21 February 1964.Heather Blundell won her third consecutive title defeating Fran Marshall for the third successive year in the final.

== Seeds ==
1. (Australia) Heather Blundell
2. (England) Fran Marshall
3. (England) Sheila Macintosh
4. (England) Anna Craven-Smith
5. (England) Mary Muncaster
6. (Australia) Jenny Irving
7. (Australia) Pat McClenaughan
8. (England) Pauline White

== Draw and results ==
=== First round ===
Player one	Player two	Score
(England) Anna Craven-Smith	(England) R Cooper	9-0 9-1 9-1
(Australia) Patricia McClenaughan	(England) P D Gimson	9-1 9-3 9-4
(England) Diane Corbett	(Scotland) Sylvia McClure	9-1 9-5 9-7
(England) B M Horton	(England) B Law	9-3 5-9 9-2 9-1
(Australia) Helen Plaisted	(England) R B Hawkey	9-3 9-0 9-5
(England) M Ashmore	(England) J Young	6-9 9-7 9-2
(England) Claire Chapman	(England) A M Backhouse	9-0 9-0 9-3
(England) Barbara McMullen	(England) S P Y Whitby	w/o
(England) Ann Price	(England) Barbara Wheen	9-4 9-3 9-0
(England) Ruth Turner	(England) D W Courtney	8-10 9-3 9-5 9-3
(England) J F Leslie	(England) M J Danks	0-9 9-2 9-6 9-3
(England) Peggy Mason	(England) A M Geddes	9-2 9-4 9-7
(England) Daphne Portway	(England) M Rutherford	9-3 3-9 9-3 9-1
(England) A Norval	(England) B Knapp	9-2 9-3 7-9 9-5

=== Second round ===
Player one	Player two	Score
(Australia) Heather Blundell	(England) Sheila Cooper	9-0 9-0 9-4
(England) Fran Marshall	(England) K J Dempsey	9-0 9-1 9-0
(England) Sheila Macintosh (née Speight)	(England) A Norval	9-0 9-5 9-1
(England) Anna Craven-Smith	(England) Diane Corbett	9-3 9-3 9-2
(England) Mary Muncaster	(England) J F Leslie	9-0 9-5 9-5
(Australia) Jenny Irving	(England) Jean Wilson	9-1 9-3 9-0
(Australia) Pat McClenaughan	(England) M Ashmore	9-0 9-0 9-1
(England) Pauline White	(Australia) Barbara Baxter	5-9 9-7 9-0 9-10 9-6
(England) Ursula Smith	(England) S M Atherden	9-0 9-1 9-0
(Australia) Helen Plaisted	(England) B M Horton	9-4 9-5 9-4
(England) M Taylor	(England) N A Watkins	9-10 9-5 9-4 9-6
(England) Claire Chapman	(England) Barbara McMullen	9-4 9-6 9-4
(Wales) Jill Campion	(Australia) Celeste Dickson	w/o
(England) Ruth Turner	(England) Ann Price	9-6 9-5 9-2
(England) C Johnson	(England) S G Youatt	9-4 9-4 9-5
(England) Daphne Portway	(England) Peggy Mason	9-2 9-0 9-3

=== Third round ===
Player one	Player two	Score
(Australia) Blundell	(England) Johnson	9-0 9-0 9-1
(England) Marshall	(England) Smith	9-0 9-1 9-0
(England) Craven-Smith	(Australia) Plaisted	6-9 9-1 9-3 9-1
(England) White	(England) Taylor	9-0 9-0 9-0
(England) Macintosh	(England) Portway	9-0 9-2 9-0
(Australia) Irving	(Wales) Campion	9-0 9-2 9-1
(Australia) McClenaughan	(England) Chapman	9-3 9-4 9-4
(England) Muncaster	(England) Turner	10-8 9-0 9-3

=== Quarter-finals ===
Player one	Player two	Score
(Australia) Blundell	(England) White	9-0 9-2 9-0
(England) Craven-Smith	(Australia) McClenaughan	2-9 9-2 9-7 9-7
(England) Marshall	(Australia) Irving	9-6 9-3 9-3
(England) Muncaster	(England) Macintosh	9-4 6-9 10-8 9-5

=== Semi-finals ===
Player one	Player two	Score
(Australia) Blundell	(England) Craven-Smith	9-4 7-9 9-1 9-3
(England) Marshall	(England) Muncaster	9-4 9-6 9-5

=== Final ===
Player one	Player two	Score
(Australia) Blundell	(England) Marshall	9-2 9-2 9-1

Preceded by 1963	British Open Squash Championships; England (London); 1964	Succeeded by 1965
