= 1965 Women's British Open Squash Championship =

British Open Squash Championships
- 37th Women's British Open Championships

Details
- Location: London, England
- Venue: Lansdowne Club and Royal Aero Club

The 1965 Women's Open Squash Championships was held at the Lansdowne Club and Royal Aero Club in London from 14–19 February 1965.Heather Blundell won her fourth consecutive title defeating Anna Craven-Smith in the final.

== Seeds ==
1. (Australia) Heather Blundell
2. (England) Fran Marshall
3. (England) Anna Craven-Smith
4. (England) Pauline White
5. (Australia) Pat McClenaughan
6. (England) Ann Price

== Draw and results ==
=== First round ===
Player one	Player two	Score
(England) Anna Craven-Smith	(England) Peggy Mason	9-0 9-0 9-0
(England) Pauline White	(England) R Cooper	9-2 9-0 9-5
(England) K J Dempsey	(England) Janet Ledger	9-2 9-1 9-3
(England) A M Backhouse	(England) S Rutherford	9-5 9-2 10-8
(England) Ruth Turner	(England) Marjorie Townsend	9-5 9-2 8-10 9-3
(England) A G Williams	(England) M Young	8-10 9-4 9-6 0-9 9-5
(England) Daphne Portway	(England) J Turner	9-10 9-7 9-2 9-0
(England) Barbara McMullen	(England) M J Bassett	9-0 9-1 9-2
(England) Ursula Smith	(England) Bobs Whitehead	9-6 9-0 9-1
(England) Sheila Cooper	(England) Betty Keenan	5-9 4-9 9-2 9-0 9-2
(England) S Francis	(England) M Makower	9-2 9-0 9-3
(Scotland) Sylvia McClure	(England) A Geddes	9-0 9-1 9-6
(England) R Crosby	(England) S G Youatt	9-0 9-4 9-7
(England) Jean Wilson	(England) M Taylor	9-1 9-5 9-2
(Scotland) Brenda Carmichael	(England) G Hogan	9-3 9-2 9-0
(England) B Law	(England) Major M U Walker	w/o

=== Second round ===
Player one	Player two	Score
(Australia) Heather Blundell	(England) June Swindell	9-0 9-0 9-1
(England) Fran Marshall	(England) B M Horton	9-1 9-0 9-2
(England) Anna Craven-Smith	(England) S Francis	9-4 9-0 9-0
(England) Pauline White	(England) Sheila Cooper	9-6 9-2 9-4
(Australia) Patricia McClenaughan	(England) Judy Wright	9-6 2 9-7-9 9-7
(England) Ann Price	(England) C Hartwell	9-4 9-2 9-0
(England) Ruth Turner	(England) A M Backhouse	9-3 9-1 9-4
(England) K J Dempsey	(Scotland) Brenda Carmichael	5-9 9-3 5-9 9-2 9-7
(Scotland) Sylvia McClure	(England) B Law	9-2 9-0 9-1
(England) Ursula Smith	(England) Daphne Portway	9-3 9-2 9-2
(England) Jean Wilson	(England) R Crosby	9-0 9-0 9-1
(England) N A Watkins	(England) D Bramfit	9-6 9-6 9-3
(England) Barbara McMullen	(England) A G Williams	9-3 9-0 9-0
(England) Jennifer Crane	(England) S M Atherden	9-1 9-0 9-0
(England) Captain P Davis	(England) A R Debus	w/o
(England) V Manning	(England) J R Tennant	9-0 9-0 9-0

=== Third round ===
Player one	Player two	Score
(Australia) Blundell	(England) Crane	9-0 9-2 9-1
(England) Craven-Smith	(England) Wilson	9-2 9-1 9-2
(England) Marshall	(England) Manning	9-0 9-5 9-0
(England) White	(England) McMullen	9-5 9-2 9-3
(England) Turner	(England) Smith	1-9 9-5 9-3 9-2
(England) Dempsey	(Scotland) McClure	6-9 10-8 9-3 6-9 9-1
(Australia) McClenaughan	(England) Watkins	9-0 9-5 9-0
(England) Price	(England) Davis	9-0 9-0 9-1

=== Quarter-finals ===
Player one	Player two	Score
(Australia) Blundell	(England) Price	9-1 9-0 9-4
(England) Craven-Smith	(England) Dempsey	9-0 9-4 9-0
(England) Marshall	(Australia) McClenaughan	9-6 9-5 10-8
(England) White	(England) Turner	9-6 8-10 9-4 9-5

=== Semi-finals ===
Player one	Player two	Score
(Australia) Blundell	(England) White	9-0 9-1 9-1
(England) Craven-Smith	(England) Marshall	1-9 6-9 9-4 10-9 9-5

=== Final ===
Player one	Player two	Score
(Australia) Blundell	(England) Craven-Smith	9-1 10-8 9-2

Preceded by 1964	British Open Squash Championships; England (London); 1965	Succeeded by 1966
