= 1969 Women's British Open Squash Championship =

British Open Squash Championships
- 41st Women's British Open Championships

Details
- Location: London, England
- Venue: Lansdowne Club and Royal Aero Club

The 1969 Women's Open Squash Championships was held at the Lansdowne Club and Royal Aero Club in London from 11 to 16 January 1969.Heather McKay (née Blundell) won her eighth consecutive title defeating Fran Marshall in the final.

== Seeds ==
1. (Australia) Heather McKay
2. (England) Fran Marshall
3. (England) Sheila Macintosh
4. (England) Claire Chapman
5. (New Zealand) Cecilie Fleming
6. (England) Ann Price
7. (Australia) Margaret Burke
8. (Scotland) Sylvia McClure

== Draw and results ==
=== First round ===
Player one	Player two	Score
(Australia) Heather McKay (née Blundell)		bye
(England) Fran Marshall		bye
(England) Sheila Macintosh (née Speight)	(England) Di Fuller	9-0 9-2 9-2
(England) Claire Chapman	(England) Sheila Cooper	9-4 9-5 9-1
(New Zealand) Cecilie Fleming	(England) M Moon	9-0 9-2 9-7
(England) Ann Price	(England) S Peach	9-7 9-2 10-8
(Australia) Margaret Burke	(England) J Hall	9-3 9-0 9-1
(Scotland) Sylvia McClure	(England) Janet Ledger	9-2 9-0 9-1
(England) Janice Townsend	(England) J F Lawrence	9-4 9-4 9-3
(Northern Ireland) Barbara Sanderson	(Australia) C Machadow	w/o
(England) Jane Poynder	(England) Beryl Hayward	9-0 9-0 9-0
(England) A Norval	(England) R Rowles	9-0 9-2 9-2
(England) Dianne Corbett	(South Africa) Miss L Stork	9-0 9-4 9-2
(England) Ann Jee	(England) C Cole	w/o
(England) Barbara McMullen	(England) Daphne Portway	9-1 9-0 9-0
(England) S Burley	(England) Vicky Lunt	9-7 9-1 4-9 5-9 10-8
(Australia) Thea Moore	(England) P Goodall	7-9 9-0 9-7 9-4
(England) Jane Barham	(England) J Turner	9-3 9-1 9-4
(United States) Goldie Edwards	(England) L Fanoni	9-3 9-2 9-1
(England) Ruth Turner	(England) D Ibrahim	9-2 9-2 9-1
(England) Soraya Haye	(England) Mary McNally	2-9 7-9 9-4 2-8 ret
(England) Joy Alexander	(England) Mandy Holdsworth	9-2 9-1 9-3
(England) A Hardy Smith	(England) E Ward	9-0 9-2 9-1
(England) Annette Picton	(England) M Lambert	w/o
(England) E M Boswell	(England) A Sinclair	9-6 6-9 9-6 9-7
(England) Bobs Whitehead	(England) B Whitehouse	w/o
(England) Valerie Watson	(England) J Pallister	9-2 9-2 9-3
(England) V Corbett	(England) Peggy Mason	9-2 9-3 6-9 9-6
(England) Y Watkins	(England) M Makower	9-1 9-1 9-4
(Scotland) Brenda Carmichael	(England) Marjorie Townsend	9-3 9-2 7-9 9-1
(England) M E Case	(England) Sue Stott	5-9 9-6 9-0 8-10 9-2

=== Second round ===
Player one	Player two	Score
(Australia) McKay	(England) Corbett	9-1 9-2 9-0
(Australia) Burke	(England) Burley	9-2 9-0 9-3

=== Third round ===
Player one	Player two	Score
(Australia) McKay	(Northern Ireland) Sanderson	9-0 9-0 9-0
(New Zealand) Fleming	(England) Alexander	6-9 9-7 10-8 1-9 9-4
(Scotland) McClure	(England) McMullen	9-1 9-4 9-1
(England) Macintosh	(England) Corbett	9-1 9-0 9-0
(England) Marshall	(England) Jee	9-0 9-1 9-2
(Australia) Burke	(Scotland) Carmichael	10-8 9-6 9-2
(England) Price	(England) Watson	9-5 9-4 9-3
(England) Chapman	(United States) Edwards	9-0 9-3 9-5

=== Quarter-finals ===
Player one	Player two	Score
(Australia) McKay	(New Zealand) Fleming	9-1 9-0 9-2
(England) Marshall	(England) Price	9-6 9-1 9-1
(Scotland) McClure	(England) Chapman	9-3 9-3 9-2-9 5
(England) Macintosh	(Australia) Burke	9-6 9-7 9-7

=== Semi-finals ===
Player one	Player two	Score
(Australia) McKay	(England) Macintosh	9-0 9-0 9-0
(England) Marshall	(Scotland) McClure	9-4 4-9 9-1 9-4

=== Final ===
Player one	Player two	Score
(Australia) McKay	(England) Marshall	9-2 9-0 9-0

Preceded by 1968	British Open Squash Championships; England (London); 1969	Succeeded by 1970
