= 1974 Women's British Open Squash Championship =

British Open Squash Championships
- 46th Women's British Open Championships

Details
- Location: London, England
- Venue: BP Club, Lower Sydenham

The 1974 Women's BP Open Squash Championships was held at the BP Club in Lower Sydenham, London from 1–7 March 1974. Heather McKay (née Blundell) won her thirteenth consecutive title defeating Sue Cogswell in the final.

== Seeds ==
1. (Australia) Heather McKay (née Blundell)
2. (England) Jane Barham
3. (England) Sue Cogswell
4. (Australia) Mavis Nancarrow
5. (England) Alex Cowie
6. (England) Jean Wilson
7. (New Zealand) Teresa Lawes
8. (England) Theo Veltman

== Draw and results ==
=== First round ===
| Player one | Player two | Score |
|---|---|---|
| (Australia) Heather McKay | | bye |
| (England) Jane Barham | | bye |
| (England) Sue Cogswell | (England) Ann Jee | 9-1 9-5 9-0 |
| (England) Alex Cowie | (England) Lynn Crosbie | 9-1 9-0 9-0 |
| (England) Jean Wilson | (England) J Pallister | 9-3 9-0 9-2 |
| (New Zealand) Teresa Lawes | (England) C Innocent | 9-4 9-0 9-0 |
| (England) Theo Veltman | (England) Di Fuller | 10-8 9-4 9-6 |
| (England) Claire Chapman | (England) J Varney | 9-3 9-0 9-2 |
| (England) Jane Pritchett | (South Africa) Ina Ackerman | 9-2 8-10 9-0 9-1 |
| (England) Dianne Corbett | (England) H Crossley | 9-0 9-0 9-0 |
| (England) Gillian Finch | (England) S Parker | 10-9 9-3 10-8 |
| (England) A Manley | (England) B Furniss | 9-4 9-5 9-6 |
| (England) Clair Richards | (England) M Scott-Miller | 9-1 9-0 9-6 |
| (England) Ann Price | (England) A Watson | 9-3 9-2 9-1 |
| (England) Fran Marshall | (England) Heather Nielson | 9-5 9-3 9-2 |
| (New Zealand) Rosemary Garvey | (Republic of Ireland) Janet Ward | 5-9 9-5 9-2 9-5 |
| (England) J Hall | (England) L Norman | 9-1 9-2 9-0 |
| (England) A Morris | (England) Soraya Haye | 9-5 9-1 9-5 |
| (Republic of Ireland) Barbara Sanderson | (England) Janet Ledger | 10-8 10-9 9-4 |
| (England) K F Spurgeon | (England) Marjorie Townsend | 9-1 9-2 9-2 |
| (England) Vivian Grisogono | (England) P Lenehan | 9-5 2-9 9-7 7-9 9-1 |
| (England) Peggy Mason | (England) K Bryceson | 9-0 9-0 9-1 |
| (England) Jane Poynder | (England) Sheila Macintosh | 9-5 9-4 9-6 |
| (England) M Mackay | | bye |
| (England) Bobs Whitehead | | bye |
| (England) Barbara Diggens | | bye |
| (England) Carol Machin | | bye |
| (England) Pauline White | | bye |
| (England) S Dunford | | bye |
| (Republic of Ireland) Geraldine Barniville | | bye |
| (England) M Brodie | | bye |
| (South Africa) Devon Lees | | bye |

Fourth seed Mavis Nancarrow (Aus) withdrew from the tournament.

=== Second round ===
| Player one | Player two | Score |
|---|---|---|
| (Australia) McKay | (England) Machin | 9-0 9-0 9-0 |
| (England) Barham | (England) White | 9-1 9-2 9-0 |
| (England) Cogswell | (England) Price | 9-2 9-3 9-5 |
| (England) Cowie | (England) Marshall | 8-9 9-10 4-9 |
| (New Zealand) Lawes | (New Zealand) Garvey | 9-1 9-2 9-3 |
| (England) Veltman | (Republic of Ireland) Barniville | 4-9 10-8 9-4 10-9 |
| (England) Chapman | (England) Hall | 9-2 9-1 9-4 |
| (England) Pritchett | (South Africa) Lees | 7-9 10-8 9-0 9-3 |
| (England) Whitehead | (England) Morris | 9-4 6-9 0-9 9-3 10-8 |
| (England) Corbett | (England) Brodie | 7-9 10-8 6-9 9-6 9-4 |
| (England) Diggens | (Republic of Ireland) Sanderson | 9-3 9-3 9-5 |
| (England) Finch | (England) Spurgeon | 8-10 9-5 9-6 6-9 9-6 |
| (England) Wilson | (England) Grisogono | 9-0 9-5 9-6 |
| (England) Dunford | (England) Mason | 9-1 9-4 9-3 |
| (England) Manley | (England) Poynder | 4-9 9-7 5-9 9-6 9-6 |
| (England) Richards | (England) Mackay | 9-3 9-1 9-2 |

=== Third round ===
| Player one | Player two | Score |
|---|---|---|
| (Australia) McKay | (England) Richards | 9-0 9-0 9-0 |
| (England) Cogswell | (England) Whitehead | 9-1 9-3 9-0 |
| (England) Barham | (England) Corbett | 9-5 5-9 9-0 9-0 |
| (England) Marshall | (England) Manley | 9-1 9-0 9-3 |
| (England) Veltman | (England) Diggens | 10-8 9-2 9-3 |
| (England) Wilson | (England) Finch | 9-0 9-3 9-0 |
| (England) Chapman | (New Zealand) Lawes | 4-9 9-6 9-1 2-9 9-6 |
| (England) Pritchett | (England) Dunford | 10-8 7-9 9-6 9-3 |

=== Quarter-finals ===
| Player one | Player two | Score |
|---|---|---|
| (Australia) McKay | (England) Veltman | 9-2 9-4 9-4 |
| (England) Cogswell | (England) Wilson | 9-5 9-1 5-9 7-9 9-3 |
| (England) Barham | (England) Chapman | 9-0 9-4 8-10 9-2 |
| (England) Marshall | (England) Pritchett | 9-3 9-2 9-0 |

=== Semi-finals ===
| Player one | Player two | Score |
|---|---|---|
| (Australia) McKay | (England) Marshall | 9-2 9-1 9-1 |
| (England) Cogswell | (England) Barham | 9-4 10-8 9-5 |

=== Third-place play-off ===
| Player one | Player two | Score |
|---|---|---|
| (England) Barham | (England) Marshall | 9-5 9-7 9-4 |

=== Final ===
| Player one | Player two | Score |
|---|---|---|
| (Australia) McKay | (England) Cogswell | 9-2 9-1 9-2 |

| Preceded by 1973 | British Open Squash Championships; England (London); 1974 | Succeeded by 1975 |
