= 1973 Women's British Open Squash Championship =

British squash event

British Open Squash Championships
- 45th Women's British Open Championships

Details
- Location: London, England
- Venue: BP Club, Lower Sydenham

The 1973 Women's Open Squash Championships was held at the BP Club in Lower Sydenham, London from 2–8 March 1973.

Heather McKay (née Blundell) won her twelfth consecutive title defeating Cecilie Fleming in the final. The final match lasted just sixteen minutes as McKay once again continued to easily outplay all opposition.

== Seeds ==
1. (Australia) Heather McKay (née Blundell)
2. (Australia) Sue Newman
3. (New Zealand) Cecilie Fleming
4. (England) Jane Barham
5. (New Zealand) Pamela Buckingham
6. (New Zealand) Jenny Webster
7. (South Africa) Ingrid Potgieter
8. (England) Claire Chapman

== Draw and result ==
=== First round ===
Player one	Player two	Score
(Australia) Heather McKay (née Blundell)		bye
(Australia) Susanne Newman		bye
(New Zealand) Cecilie Fleming	(England) S B Groves	9-2 9-0 9-2
(England) Jane Barham	(England) M Clemens	9-3 9-0 9-1
(New Zealand) Pamela Buckingham	(England) J L Rafter	9-0 9-0 9-0
(New Zealand) Jenny Webster	(Scotland) Brenda Carmichael	4-9 9-6 3-9 9-0 9-1
(South Africa) Ingrid Potgieter	(England) Karen Gardner	9-3 9-4 9-6
(England) Claire Chapman		bye
(England) Dianne Corbett	(Pakistan) Rukshana Rashid	9-2 9-3 9-3
(England) Fran Marshall	(England) M Scott-Miller	9-4 9-3 9-0
(New Zealand) Jenny Grieve	(England) Gillian Finch	9-3 9-0 9-0
(England) Sue Pexman	(England) J Chamberlain	w/o
(England) Jane Poynder	(England) S Findlay	w/o
(England) Jean Wilson	(England) Ann Price	w/o
(England) Alex Cowie	(Zambia) Joyce Maycock	9-2 9-10 9-7 9-5
(England) Sue Cogswell	(England) C R Bourdon	9-1 9-0 9-2
(England) Bobs Whitehead	(England) Barbara Diggens	9-2 6-9 8-9 10-8 9-0
(England) Ruth Turner	(England) Ann Jee	2-9 9-7 9-6 9-3
(England) Di Fuller	(England) Lesley Moore	9-5 9-4 9-5
(England) Theo Veltman	(England) Soraya Haye	9-6 9-2 10-8
(England) Peggy Mason	(England) B Kirk	w/o
(England) Janet Ledger	(England) J Pallister	10-8 9-6 9-5
(England) Tessa Lawrence	(England) M Brodie	1-9 9-3 9-3 9-1
(England) S Dunford	(England) M D Furness	9-3 9-5 9-7
(South Africa) Valerie Bridgens	(England) A M Sinclair	9-5 9-5 9-0
(England) Janice Wainwright		bye
(England) Clair Richards		bye
(South Africa) Denise Holton		bye
(Republic of Ireland) Janet Ward		bye
(New Zealand) Teresa Lawes		bye
(England) E Davies		bye

=== Second round ===
Player one	Player two	Score
(Australia) McKay	(England) Davies	9-0 9-3 9-0
(Australia) Newman	(Republic of Ireland) Ward	w/o
(New Zealand) Fleming	(England) Lawrence	10-8 9-4 9-1
(New Zealand) Buckingham	(England) Pexman	9-3 10-8 9-1
(New Zealand) Webster	(England) Richards	9-0 9-0 9-0
(South Africa) Potgieter	(South Africa) Bridgens	9-7 9-4 9-3
(England) Marshall	(England) Turner	9-3 9-4 9-2
(South Africa) Holton	(New Zealand) Lawes	9-6 9-0 7-9 9-7

=== Third round ===
Player one	Player two	Score
(Australia) McKay	(England) Wainwright	9-0 9-0 9-1
(New Zealand) Fleming	(England) Wilson	9-2 3-9 9-4 9-2
(Australia) Newman	(South Africa) Holton	9-4 9-7 9-3
(England) Barham	(New Zealand) Grieve	8-10 9-1 9-4 9-0
(New Zealand) Buckingham	(England) Cogswell	9-2 9-4 9-3
(New Zealand) Webster	(England) Veltman	9-3 9-3 10-9
(South Africa) Potgieter	(England) Cowie	9-4 9-3 7-9 9-7
(England) Marshall	(England) Chapman	9-0 9-3 0-9 4-9 10-8

=== Quarter-finals ===
Player one	Player two	Score
(Australia) McKay	(England) Marshall	9-0 9-1 9-3
(New Zealand) Fleming	(New Zealand) Webster	9-2 4-9 1-9 9-1 9-3
(Australia) Newman	(South Africa) Potgieter	9-10 9-5 9-1 3-9 9-2
(New Zealand) Buckingham	(England) Barham	9-6 9-4 8-10 9-1

=== Semi-finals ===
Player one	Player two	Score
(Australia) McKay	(New Zealand) Buckingham	9-2 9-0 9-0
(New Zealand) Fleming	(Australia) Newman	1-9 7-9 9-7 9-2 10-8

=== Third-place play-off ===
Player one	Player two	Score
(Australia) Newman	(New Zealand) Buckingham	9-5 9-2 9-5

=== Final ===
Player one	Player two	Score
(Australia) McKay	(New Zealand) Fleming	9-1 9-0 9-1

Preceded by 1972	British Open Squash Championships; England (London); 1973	Succeeded by 1974
