= 2002 Racquetball World Championships =

- XI Racquetball World Championships: San Juan, Puerto Rico 2002 -
Host	San Juan; Puerto Rico
Dates	August 3 - August 10
- Men teams
Champions	Canada
Runners-up	United States
Third place	Mexico
Fourth place	Japan
- Women teams
Champions	United States
Runners-up	Canada
Third place	Bolivia
Fourth place	Mexico
- Men's singles
Gold	(United States) Jack Huczek
Silver	(United States) Jason Thoerner
Bronze	(Canada) Kane Waselenchuk (Canada) Brian Istace
- Women's singles
Gold	(United States) Cheryl Gudinas
Silver	(Canada) Jennifer Saunders
Bronze	(Canada) Josée Grand'Maître (United States) Laura Fenton

The International Racquetball Federation's 11th Racquetball World Championships were held in San Juan (Puerto Rico) from August 3 to August 10, 2002, with 32 men's national teams and 19 women's national teams, and several players in the singles and doubles competitions.

== Men's team competition ==
Round of 32
Canada
Costa Rica	2
Belgium	1
Argentina	2
Dominican Republic	1
(United Kingdom) Great Britain	1
Australia	2
Japan	Default
(Philippines)
Nigeria
Guatemala
South Korea
Jamaica
Venezuela
Mexico
Guam	1
Netherlands	1
Chile	2
Greece	1
France	0
Bolivia	3
Germany	1
Ecuador	2
India	2
Puerto Rico	1
Honduras	3
(Republic of Ireland) Ireland	0
(United States) USA

Round of 16
Canada	3
Costa Rica	0
Argentina	2
Australia	1
Japan	2
Guatemala	1
South Korea	1
Venezuela	2
Mexico	2
Netherlands	1
Chile	1
Bolivia	2
Ecuador	1
India	2
Honduras	0
(United States) USA	3

Quarter finals
Canada	2
Argentina	1
Japan	2
Venezuela	1
Mexico	2
Bolivia	1
India	0
(United States) USA	3

Semi finals
Canada	2
Japan	1
Mexico	0
(United States) USA	3

Finals
Canada	2
(United States) USA	1

Winners
CANADA

== Women's team competition ==
Round of 32
(United States) USA
Vietnam
Ecuador
India
Puerto Rico
Mexico
(Republic of Ireland) Ireland
Germany
Chile
Japan
Jamaica
Venezuela
Bolivia
South Korea
Guatemala
Costa Rica
Canada

Round of 16
(United States) USA	3
Vietnam	0
India	3
Puerto Rico	0
Mexico	2
(Republic of Ireland) Ireland	1
Germany	1
Chile	2
Japan	2
Jamaica	1
Venezuela	1
Bolivia	2
South Korea	3
Guatemala	0
Costa Rica	0
Canada	3

Quarter finals
(United States) USA	2
Puerto Rico	1
Mexico	2
Chile	1
Japan	1
Bolivia	2
South Korea	1
Canada	2

Semi finals
(United States) USA	3
Mexico	0
Bolivia	1
Canada	2

Finals
(United States) USA	3
Canada	0

Winners
United States

== Men's singles competition ==
Round of 64
1	(Canada) Brian Istace
64
33	(Costa Rica) Albert Dent	5, 15, 10
32	(Republic of Ireland) Jimmy Gannon	15, 7, 11
17	(Argentina) Shai Manzuri	15, 15
48	(Dominican Republic) Yamil Isaias	10, 8
49	(United Kingdom) Gary Shaw	15, 15
16	(Australia) Paul Feeney	9, 12
9	(Japan) Hiroshi Shimizu	default
56	(Haiti)
41	(Nigeria) Tony Onimole	4, 5
24	(Guatemala) Monola Bendfelt	15, 15
25	(South Korea) Sang-Soo Lee	15, 15
40	(Jamaica) Don Bryan	6, 8
57	(Philippines) Benjamin Doniego	6, 8
8	(Venezuela) Marcelo Leprea	15, 15
5	(Canada) Brian Istace	15, 15
60	(Peru) Robert Bagley	7, 7
37	(Guam) Steve Venzlauskas	1, 10
28	(Netherlands) Michiel Vander Holst	15, 15
21	(Chile) Pablo Fajre	15, 15
44	(Greece) George Poriotis	7, 4
53	(France) Alexandre Francois	5, 2
12	(Bolivia) Louis Iporre	15, 15
13	(Germany) Martin Klippel	15, 15
52	(Ecuador) Gustavo Molina	6, 13
45	(India) Raul Soloni	15, 4, 6
20	(Puerto Rico) Miguel Santiago	5, 15, 11
29	(Honduras) Roberto Nasser	15, 15
36	(Belgium) Bart Wouters	3, 4
61
4	(United States) Jason Thoerner
3	(Canada) Kane Waselenchuk	15, 15
62	(Syria) Mahab Khatib	1, 1
35	(Costa Rica) Juan Cageao	15, 15
30	(Republic of Ireland) Pan Hanley	11, 8
19	(Argentina) Danny Maggi	15, 15
46	(Greece) Gus Tsouras	0, 6
51	(United Kingdom) Mark Nolan	2, 3
14	(Australia) Darren Strengers	15, 15
11	(Japan) Masaru Yoshimura	15, 15
54	(Ecuador) Juan Luis Cueva	2, 5
43	(Nigeria) Sunny Osagi	15, 10, 11
22	(Guatemala) Fernando Sierra	11, 15, 6
27	(South Korea) Kim Dongyoun	15, 15
38	(Jamaica) Jonathan Edwards	6, 7
59	(Philippines) Orlando Mayo	3, 3
6	(Venezuela) Cesar Castro	15, 15
7	(Mexico) Javier Moreno	default
58	(Haiti)
39	(Guam) Francis Guzman	13, 4
26	(Netherlands) Pascal Matla	15, 15
23	(Chile) Sebastian Roessler	10, 11
42	(Belize) Matthew Anderson	15, 15
55	(France) Roger Pieroni	1, 0
10	(Bolivia) Santigo Canedo	15, 15
15	(Germany) Arne Schmitz	8, 4
50	(Dominican Republic) Leonel Simó	15, 15
47	(India) Vincent Kapur	9, 7
18	(Puerto Rico) Curtis Winter	15, 15
31	(Honduras) Rolando Bier	15, 15
34	(Belgium) Niklaas Neboutte	2, 6
63	(Uruguay) Gus Farrell	3, 3
2	(United States) Jack Huczek	15, 15

Round of 32
(Canada) Brian Istace	15, 15
(Republic of Ireland) Jimmy Gannon	5, 4
(Argentina) Shai Mazuri	15, 15
(United Kingdom) Gary Shaw	2, 3
(Japan) Hiroshi Shimizu	15, 15
(Guatemala) Monola Bendfelt	6, 4
(South Korea) Sang-Soo Lee	10, 15, 11
(Venezuela) Marcelo Leprea	15, 13, 7
(Mexico) Alvaro Beltran	15, 15
(Netherlands) Michiel Vander Holst	2, 9
(Chile) Pablo Fajre	15, 12, 11
(Bolivia) Louis Iporre	8, 15, 6
(Germany) Martin Klippel	8, 8
(Puerto Rico) Miguel Santiago	15, 15
(Honduras) Roberto Nasser	10, 1
(United States) Jason Thoerner	15, 15
(Canada) Kane Waselenchuk	15, 15
(Costa Rica) Juan Cageao	1, 1
(Argentina) Danni Maggi	15, 5, 6
(Australia) Darren Strengers	5, 15, 11
(Japan) Hirotake Usami	default
(Niger) Sunny Osagi	-
(South Korea) Kim Dongyoun	4, 7
(Venezuela) Cesar Castro	15, 15
(Mexico) Javier Moreno	15, 15
(Netherlands) Pascal Matla	3, 3
(Belize) Matthew Anderson	6, 15, 7
(Bolivia) Santigo Canedo	15, 4, 11
(Dominican Republic) Leonel Simó	7, 12
(Puerto Rico) Curtis Winter	15, 15
(Honduras) Rolando Bier	4, 1
(United States) Jack Huczek	15, 15

Round of 16
(Canada) Brian Istace	15, 15
(Argentina) Shai Manzuri	3, 5
(Japan) Hiroshi Shimizu	15, 15
(South Korea) Marcelo Laprea	7, 12
(Mexico) Alvaro Beltran	15, 15
(Chile) Pablo Fajre	10, 12
(Puerto Rico) Miguel Santiago	6, 6
(United States) Jason Thoerner	15, 15
(Canada) Kane Waselenchuk	15, 15
(Australia) Darren Strengers	1, 1
(Japan) Hirotake Usami	15, 11, 10
(Venezuela) Cesar Castro	8, 15, 11
(Mexico) Javier Moreno	15, 15
(Bolivia) Santigo Canedo	7, -
(Puerto Rico) Curtis Winter	9, 4
(United States) Jack Huczek	15, 15

Quarter finals
(Canada) Brian Istace	15, 15
(Japan) Hiroshi Shimizu	4, 7
(Mexico) Alvaro Beltran	12, 13
(United States) Jason Thoerner	15, 15
(Canada) Kane Waselenchuk	15, 15
(Venezuela) Cesar Castro	6, 6
(Mexico) Javier Moreno	3, 10
(United States) Jack Huczek	15, 15

Semi finals
(Canada) Brian Istace	6, 15, 11
(United States) Jason Thoerner	15, 14, 8
(Canada) Kane Waselenchuk	3, 14
(United States) Jack Huczek	15, 15

Final
(United States) Jason Thoerner	7, 3
(United States) Jack Huczek	15, 15

Winner
Jack Huczek (United States)

== Women's singles competition ==
Round of 64
1	(United States) Cheryl Gudinas
64
33	(Dominican Republic) Claudine García	15, 15,
32	(Vietnam) Thao Le	0, 0
17	(India) Jennifer Dering
48
49
16	(Puerto Rico) Raquel Pérez
9	(Mexico) Lupita Torres
56
41
24	(Republic of Ireland) Elma Gibney
25	(Germany) Yvonne Kortes
40
57
8	(Chile) Carmen Luz Pizarro
5	(Japan) Hiromi Miyamoto
60
37	(Haiti)
28	(Jamaica) Lurine Barnes	Default
21	(Venezuela) Lily Geyer
44
53
12	(Bolivia) Yaque Parada
13	(South Korea) Jane Moon Young
52
45
20	(Guatemala) Karen Zachrison
29	(Ecuador) Francine Matthews	15, 15
36	(Costa Rica) Diana Bolanos	3, 0
61
4	(Canada) Josée Grand'Maître
3	(United States) Laura Fenton
62
35	(Haiti)
30	(Vietnam) Lan Huynh
19	(India) Joy Dholakia
46
51
14	(Puerto Rico) Anita Maldonado
11	(Mexico) Nancy Enriquez
54
43
22	(Republic of Ireland) Joan Kennedy
27	(Chinese Taipei) Sue Linn	15, 6, 10
38	(Germany) Ramona Von Ondarza	12, 15, 11
59
6	(Chile) Angela Grisar
7	(Japan) Toshiko Sakamoto
58
39
26	(Jamaica) Jackie Gopie
23	(Venezuela) Vivana Reveron
42
55
10	(Bolivia) Carole Loma
15	(South Korea) Malhee Kwon
50
47
18	(Guatemala) Monica Barrios
31	(Ecuador) Martha Jarrin	13, 15, 8
34	(Costa Rica) Ina Raven	15, 4, 11
63
2	(Canada) Jennifer Saunders

Round of 32
(United States) Cheryl Gudinas	15, 15
(Dominican Republic) Claudine García	2, 1
(India) Jennifer Dering	10, 8
(Puerto Rico) Raquel Pérez	15, 15
(Mexico) Lupita Torres	15, 15
(Republic of Ireland) Elma Gibney	4, 2
(Germany) Yvonne Kortes	9, 10
(Chile) Carmen Luz Pizarro	15, 15
(Japan) Hiromi Miyamoto	15, 15
(Jamaica) Lurine Barnes	1, 1
(Venezuela) Lily Geyer	9, 8
(Bolivia) Yanda Parada	15, 15
(South Korea) Jang Moon Young	15, 15
(Guatemala) Karen Zachrison	5, 3
(Ecuador) Francine Matthews	0, 1
(Canada) Josée Grand'Maître	15, 15
(United States) Laura Fenton	15, 15
(France) Lan Huynh	2, 1
(India) Joy Dholakia	1, 1
(Venezuela) Anita Maldonado	15, 15
(Mexico) Nancy Enriquez	15, 15
(Republic of Ireland) Joan Kennedy	4, 4
(Germany) Ramona Von Ondarza	1, 0
(Chile) Angela Grisar	15, 15
(Japan) Toshiko Sakamoto	15, 15
(Jamaica) Jackie Gopie	7, 7
(Venezuela) Vivana Reveron	1, 2
(Bolivia) Carola Loma	15, 15
(South Korea) Mai-He Kwon	15, 15
(Guatemala) Monica Barrios	2, 1
(Costa Rica) Ina Raven	1, 0
(Canada) Jennifer Saunders	15, 15

Round of 16
(United States) Cheryl Gudinas	15, 15
(Puerto Rico) Raquel Perez	10, 8
(Mexico) Lupita Torres	15, 15
(Chile) Carmen Luz Pizarro	2, 1
(Japan) Hiromi Miyamoto	15, 15
(Bolivia) Yaque Parada	8, 11
(South Korea) Jang Moon Young	15, 3, 0
(Canada) Josée Grand'Maître	5, 15, 11
(United States) Laura Fenton	15, 15
(Puerto Rico) Anita Maldonado	6, 6
(Mexico) Nancy Enriquez	2, 4
(Chile) Angela Grisar	15, 15
(Japan) Toshiko Sakamoto	15, 9, 11
(Bolivia) Carola Loma	5, 15, 5
(South Korea) Malhee Kwon	11, 1
(Canada) Jennifer Saunders	15, 15

Quarter finals
(United States) Cheryl Gudinas	15, 15
(Mexico) Lupita Torres	3, 5
(Japan) Hiromi Miyamoto	15, 5, 6
(Canada) Josée Grand'Maître	4, 15, 11
(United States) Laura Fenton	15, 15
(Chile) Angela Grisar	12, 1
(Japan) Toshiko Sakamoto	10, 14
(Canada) Jennifer Saunders	15, 15

Semi finals
(United States) Cheryl Gudinas	15, 15
(Canada) Josée Grand'Maître	7, 6
(United States) Laura Fenton	6, 15, 3
(Canada) Jennifer Saunders	15, 7, 11

Final
(United States) Cheryl Gudinas	15, 15
(Canada) Jennifer Saunders	13, 13

Winner
Cheryl Gudinas (United States)

== See also ==
- Racquetball World Championships
