= Heather McKay =

Australian squash player

Heather McKay AO MBE
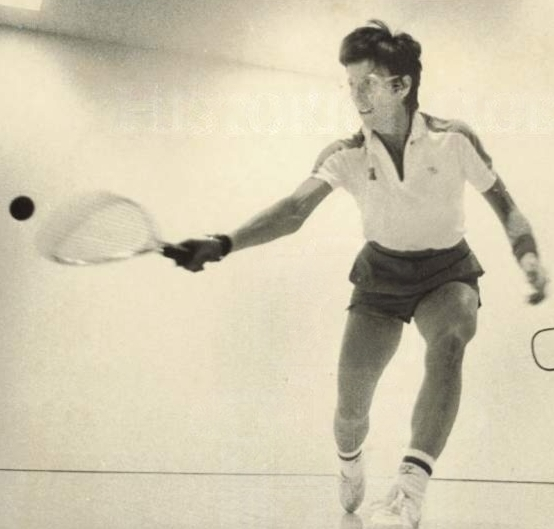
- McKay playing racquetball

Personal information
- Full name: Heather Pamela McKay
- Born: 31 July 1941 (age 85) Queanbeyan, New South Wales
- Height: 1.68 m (5 ft 6 in)

Sport
- Country: Australia
- Turned pro: 1960 (squash)
- Retired: 1979 (squash)

Women's Singles
- Highest ranking: 1
- World Open: W (1976, 1979)
Medal record
Women's squash
Representing Australia
World Championships
Gold medal – first place	1976 Brisbane	Singles
Gold medal – first place	1979 Sheffield	Singles

Heather Pamela McKay (née Blundell) (born 31 July 1941) is an Australian retired squash player, who is considered by many to be the greatest female player in the history of the game. She dominated the women's squash game in the 1960s and 1970s, winning 16 consecutive British Open titles from 1962 to 1977, and capturing the inaugural women's World Open title in 1976, while remaining undefeated during that period. She was also a top-level player of other sports, including field hockey and racquetball.

== Career ==
McKay was born in 1941 as Heather Blundell in Queanbeyan. She came from a family of eleven children. Her father was a baker and her mother a stay-at-home parent. The entire family was athletic, with some members competing at a high level. Her parents encouraged McKay to play tennis in the summer and hockey in the winter. It wasn't until she was eighteen years old that she encountered squash as a way to improve her fitness. Initially, she did this non-professionally and without formal coaching, until a friend suggested she compete in the New South Wales Country Championship. There, she won the junior and women's titles.

Her success at that championship was noticed by the president of the Australian Squash Association. On his recommendation, McKay participated in the 1960 New South Wales Championships in Sydney. She won the junior tournament but lost in the quarterfinals of the women's tournament to Yvonne West. After this tournament, she shifted her focus from tennis to squash, although she did not completely give up other sports. Her potential was also noticed by squash champion, and the patriarch of the Khan squash family of Pakistan, Hashim Khan, who told the press in Canberra, "this girl could be very good".

In 1960, she won the Australian title for the first time, which she would win thirteen more times consecutively. She also won the New South Wales and Victoria championships between 1961 and 1973. Supported by sponsors, she then moved to Sydney to further her career. There, she met Brian McKay, whom she married in 1965 and whose surname she took.

In 1962, she lost to Fran Marshall at the Scottish Championship. This was her second loss in her professional career, and the last until her retirement in 1979. That same year, she participated for the first time in the British Open Squash Championship, known until 1976 as the unofficial world championship. She won this tournament and the following fifteen times.

Meanwhile, McKay remained interested in other sports from her youth. She represented Australia in hockey in 1967 and 1971.

In 1976, she won the first World Open Squash for women, although it is disputed whether this tournament was an official world championship. McKay moved to Toronto in 1975 and competed in the US squash championship in 1977, which she won. In 1979, she competed again in the World Open Squash, this time officially undisputed, and won it again.

At the age of 38 McKay retired from squash. McKay wrote a book, Heather McKay's Complete Book of Squash, which was released in 1979. After her retirement she took up racquetball, in which she was also successful. As early as 1977, she won the US Amateur Racquetball Championship. In 1980, she won the Canadian Racquetball Championship, which she won again from 1982 to 1985. In 1980, 1981, and 1984, she won the US Professional Racquetball Championship.

In 1985, she moved back to Australia. That year, she became an assistant coach for squash at the Australian Institute of Sport in Brisbane, with Geoff Hunt as head coach. In that role, she coached Michelle Martin, Natalie Grinham, and Rachel Grinham. Besides coaching, she also won the World Masters Squash Championships four times during that period: in 1987 and 1990 in the over-45 category and in 1993 and 1995 in the over-50 category. She stopped coaching in 1999 and ended her involvement in squash. She then moved to Canberra.

Since the late 1990s, she has participated in senior tennis tournaments, both singles and doubles. In 2001, she won the World Senior Championships and the team event, the Alice Marble Cup. In 2016, her husband died, which prompted her to move back to Queanbeyan in 2018.

== Championship results ==
=== World Open ===
Year	Location	Opponent in the final	Score in the final	Outcome
1976	Brisbane, Australia	(Australia) Marion Jackman	9–2, 9–2, 9–0	Winner
1979	Sheffield, England	(England) Sue Cogswell	6–9, 9–3, 9–1, 9–4	Winner

=== British Open ===
Year	Location	Opponent in the final	Score in the final	Outcome
1962	The Royal Automobile Club – London	(England) Fran Marshall	9–6, 9–5, 9–4	Winner
1963	Landsdowne and Royal Aero Clubs	(England) Fran Marshall	9–4, 9–2, 9–6	Winner
1964	Landsdowne and Royal Aero Clubs	(England) Fran Marshall	9–2, 9–2, 9–1	Winner
1965	Landsdowne and Royal Aero Clubs	(England) Anna Craven-Smith	9–0, 9–1, 9–2	Winner
1966	Landsdowne and Royal Aero Clubs	(England) Anna Craven-Smith	9–0, 9–0, 10–8	Winner
1967	London, England	(England) Anna Craven-Smith	9–1, 10–8, 9–6	Winner
1968	London, England	(Australia) Bev Johnson	9–0, 9–0, 9–0	Winner
1969	Sheffield, England	(England) Fran Marshall	9–2, 9–0, 9–0	Winner
1970	Birmingham, England	(South Africa) Marcia Roche	9–1, 9–1, 9–0	Winner
1971	Birmingham, England	(England) Jenny Irving	9–0, 9–3, 9–1	Winner
1972	Sheffield, England	(South Africa) Kathy Malan	9–1, 9–1, 9–2	Winner
1973	Sheffield, England	(New Zealand) Cecilie Fleming	9–1, 9–0, 9–1	Winner
1974	Sheffield, England	(England) Sue Cogswell	9–2, 9–1, 9–2	Winner
1975	Wembley, England	(Australia) Marion Jackman	9–3, 9–1, 9–5	Winner
1976	Wembley, England	(Australia) Sue Newman	9–2, 9–4, 9–2	Winner
1977	Wembley, England	(Australia) Barbara Wall	9–3, 9–1, 9–2	Winner

== Recognition ==
- 1967 – ABC Sportsman of the Year
- 1969 – Appointed Member of the Order of the British Empire (MBE) for services in sporting and international spheres.
- 1979 – Appointed Member of the Order of Australia (AM) for services to the sport of squash.
- 1985 – Sport Australia Hall of Fame inductee
- 1997 – USA Racquetball Hall of Fame
- 2000 – Australian Sports Medal
- Squash Australia Hall of Fame
- 2001 – Victorian Honour Roll of Women
- 2018 – Appointed Officer of the Order of Australia (AO) for "distinguished service to squash as an elite player and coach, as a pioneer on the professional circuit, and through support for young athletes".

== Bibliography ==
- McKay, Heather; Batten, Jack (1978). Heather McKay's complete book of squash. London: Angus & Robertson. ISBN 0-207-95785-1.

== See also ==
- Ladies Professional Racquetball Tour

== Footnotes ==
Sporting positions
Preceded by Premier; Lynn Adams	No. 1 Women's Pro Racquetball Player; 1980–81; 1982–83 to 1983–84	Succeeded by Lynn Adams; Lynn Adams
