= Lori-Jane Powell =

Canadian racquetball player (1971–2021)

Lori Jane Powell
Personal information
- Nationality: Canadian
- Born: November 8, 1971 Prince Albert, Saskatchewan
- Died: November 18, 2021 (aged 50) Calgary, Alberta

Sport
- Sport: Racquetball
- Retired: 2007

Achievements and titles
- National finals: 1at Singles (1995, 2003, 2004), 1st Doubles (1999, 2001)
- Highest world ranking: 9th (2000-01, 2001-02, 2002-03)
Medal record
Women's Racquetball
Representing Canada
World Championships
Bronze medal – third place	2006 Santo Domingo	Doubles
Gold medal – first place	2000 San Luis Potosi	Team
Pan American Games
Bronze medal – third place	2003 Santo Domingo	Singles
Silver medal – second place	1999 Winnipeg	Doubles
Pan Am Championships
Gold medal – first place	2004 Cuenca	Singles
Bronze medal – third place	2003 Santo Domingo	Doubles
Gold medal – first place	2002 Cochabamba	Doubles
Bronze medal – third place	2001 San Pedro Sula	Singles

Lori Jane Powell (November 8, 1971 – November 18, 2021) was a Canadian racquetball player from Prince Albert, Saskatchewan. Powell was Pan American Champion twice (1 singles & 1 doubles title) and Canadian Champion five times (three singles & two doubles titles). She retired in 2007 due to a right knee injury.

== Professional career ==
Powell was ranked in the top 10 of the Women's Professional Racquetball Organization (WPRO) at the end of four seasons. Her career best finishes were two semi-finals.

== International career ==
Powell won gold medals on two of her 18 international appearances with Team Canada. She won singles at the 2004 Pan American Racquetball Championships and doubles in 2002 with Karina Odegard at the Pan American Championships. Powell was also part of Team Canada that won the overall team title at the 2000 World Championships, which is the only time the USA has not won that title.

Powell was also a silver medalist in doubles at the 1999 Pan American Games with Debbie Ward, losing the final to Americans Jackie Paraiso and Joy MacKenzie.

Powell was a bronze medalist on four occasions: in singles at the 2003 Pan Am Games and 2001 Pan American Championships and in doubles with Amanda MacDonald at 2003 Pan American Championships and with Josée Grand'Maître at 2006 World Championships, which was Powell's last competition.

== Canadian career ==
Powell was Canadian Women's Singles Champion three times: in 1995, 2003, and 2004. She was also the Canadian Women's Doubles Champion twice: in 1999 with Debbie Ward and in 2001 with Josée Grand'Maître.

== Personal ==
Powell earned a B.A. (psychology) and M.S. (kinesiology) from the University of Saskatchewan, and was certification as both a physical and mental trainer. She ran Powell-Performance, a physical and mental training business, when she lived in Calgary.

Powell received the Women's Award from Racquetball Canada in 2003 in recognition of contributions that advance women in racquetball. Also, she was Racquetball Canada's Technical Director from 2004 to 2009.

She was inducted into the Prince Albert Sports Hall of Fame in 2006. Powell was the Prince Albert Female Athlete of the Year in 2000.

Powell died in Calgary after suffering a heart attack in her sleep.
