= Fran Marshall =

Kenyan-English squash player

Fran Marshall (12 May 1930 – ?? 2011) was a squash player from England. She won the British Open in 1961, defeating Ruth Turner in the final in straight sets 9–3, 9–5, 9–1. She was also the runner-up at the championship in 1960, 1962, 1963, 1964 and 1969. She also won the Scottish Open in 1962 beating Heather McKay in straight games, making her the last woman to defeat Heather McKay in squash.

Marshall was raised in Kenya, and she represented Kenya in tennis at the Wimbledon Championships and was part of the Kenyan team at the 1981 Women's World Team Squash Championships.

After marrying her husband, who was in the British Army, she moved to England and had lived there permanently since 1957.
