= 2005 Women's World Open Squash Championship =

Women's World Open 2005
- 22nd WISPA World Squash Championship
- Location: Hong Kong
- Date: 29 November – 4 December 2005
- Website squashtalk.com/hongkong/2005/wdraw2005.html

WISPA World Tour
- Category: WISPA World Open
- Prize money: $72,500

Results
- Champion: (Malaysia) Nicol David
- Runner-up: (Australia) Rachael Grinham
- Semi-finalists: (Netherlands) Vanessa Atkinson (Australia) Natalie Grinham

The 2005 Women's World Open Squash Championship is the women's edition of the 2005 World Open, which serves as the individual world championship for squash players. The event took place in Hong Kong from 29 November to 4 December 2005. Nicol David won her first World Open trophy, beating Rachael Grinham in the final.

== Ranking points ==
In 2005, the points breakdown were as follows:

World Open (2005)
Event	W	F	SF	QF	2R	1R
Points (WISPA)	3360	2310	1365	735	367,5	210

== Seeds ==
1. (Australia) Rachael Grinham (final)
2. (Netherlands) Vanessa Atkinson (semi-finals)
3. (Malaysia) Nicol David (champion)
4. (Australia) Natalie Grinham (semi-finals)
5. (England) Linda Elriani (quarter-finals)
6. (England) Vicky Botwright (quarter-finals)
7. (England) Jenny Duncalf (second round)
8. (Egypt) Omneya Abdel Kawy (quarter-finals)
9. (England) Tania Bailey (second round)
10. (Republic of Ireland) Madeline Perry (quarter-finals)
11. (New Zealand) Shelley Kitchen (first round)
12. (Netherlands) Annelize Naudé (second round)
13. (France) Isabelle Stoehr (second round)
14. (England) Alison Waters (second round)
15. (Hong Kong) Rebecca Chiu (second round)
16. (England) Laura Lengthorn (second round)

== Draw and results ==
First round
1	(Australia) R Grinham	9	9	9
Q	(Scotland) P Nimmo	1	3	4
15	(Hong Kong) R Chiu	9	9	9
Q	(Mexico) S Terán	6	3	5
7	(England) J Duncalf	9	9	9
(England) D Lloyd-Walter	2	2	5
10	(Republic of Ireland) M Perry	9	5	9	9
Q	(Australia) M Martin	3	9	2	4
4	(Australia) N Grinham	9	9	9
Q	(England) B Botwright	1	0	3
12	(Netherlands) A Naudé	9	9	9
(United States) L Khan	2	2	7
8	(Egypt) O Abdel Kawy	9	9	9
Q	(Australia) D Desira	4	4	7
11	(New Zealand) S Kitchen	7	6	7
(Wales) T Malik	9	9	9
Q	(England) S Pierrepont	4	4	9	4
16	(England) L Lengthorn	9	9	6	9
5	(England) L Elriani	9	9	9
(Australia) A Pittock	3	1	4
9	(England) T Bailey	9	9	9
Q	(Netherlands) K Kronemeyer	0	0	4
3	(Malaysia) N David	9	9	9
(Egypt) E Kheirallah	0	4	0
14	(England) A Waters	5	9	9	9
(New Zealand) T Leevey	9	5	3	3
6	(England) V Botwright	9	9	9
Q	(Australia) K Brown	4	0	3
Q	(England) L Briggs	3	5	9	2
13	(France) I Stoehr	9	9	5	9
Q	(Egypt) R El Weleily	4	3	2
2	(Netherlands) V Atkinson	9	9	9

Second round
1	(Australia) R Grinham	9	9	9
15	(Hong Kong) R Chiu	3	2	7
7	(England) J Duncalf	0	6	10	9	5
10	(Republic of Ireland) M Perry	9	9	8	1	9
4	(Australia) N Grinham	9	6	9	9
12	(Netherlands) A Naudé	4	9	0	4
8	(Egypt) O Abdel Kawy	9	8	9	6	9
(Wales) T Malik	4	10	1	9	3
16	(England) L Lengthorn	3	4	6
5	(England) L Elriani	9	9	9
9	(England) T Bailey	6	5	7
3	(Malaysia) N David	9	9	9
14	(England) A Waters	4	0	3
6	(England) V Botwright	9	9	9
13	(France) I Stoehr	5	10	2	2
2	(Netherlands) V Atkinson	9	9	9	9

Quarter-finals
1	(Australia) R Grinham	9	9	10
10	(Republic of Ireland) M Perry	4	4	8
4	(Australia) N Grinham	9	1	9	9
8	(Egypt) O Abdel Kawy	1	9	4	0
5	(England) L Elriani	4	7	7
3	(Malaysia) N David	9	9	9
5	(England) V Botwright	6	0	7
3	(Netherlands) V Atkinson	9	9	9

Semi-finals
1	(Australia) R Grinham	10	9	9
4	(Australia) N Grinham	8	6	4
Final
1	(Australia) R Grinham	10	2	6	7
3	(Malaysia) N David	8	9	9	9
3	(Malaysia) N David	6	9	10	9
2	(Netherlands) V Atkinson	9	1	9	3

Note: * Q = Qualifier, * w/o = Walkover, * r = Retired

== See also ==
- World Open
- 2005 Men's World Open Squash Championship

Preceded by Malaysia (Kuala Lumpur); 2004	WISPA World Open; Hong Kong; 2005	Succeeded by Northern Ireland (Belfast) 2006
