= 2004 Women's World Open Squash Championship =

Women's World Open 2004
- 21st WISPA World Squash Championship
- Location: (Malaysia) Kuala Lumpur
- Date: 7–11 December 2004
- Website www.squashsite.co.uk/womens_world_open.htm

WISPA World Tour
- Category: WISPA World Open
- Prize money: $72,500

Results
- Champion: (Netherlands) Vanessa Atkinson
- Runner-up: (Australia) Natalie Grinham
- Semi-finalists: (Malaysia) Nicol David (Australia) Rachael Grinham

The 2004 Women's World Open Squash Championship is the women's edition of the 2004 World Open, which serves as the individual world championship for squash players. The event took place in Kuala Lumpur in Malaysia from 7 to 11 December 2004. Vanessa Atkinson won her first World Open trophy, beating Natalie Grinham in the final.

== Seeds ==
1. (Australia) Rachael Grinham (semifinals)
2. (England) Cassie Jackman (second round)
3. (Netherlands) Vanessa Atkinson (champion)
4. (Australia) Natalie Grinham (final)
5. (England) Linda Elriani (quarterfinals)
6. (Malaysia) Nicol David (semifinals)
7. (England) Fiona Geaves (first round)
8. (England) Rebecca Macree (quarterfinals)
9. (Egypt) Omneya Abdel Kawy (first round)
10. (England) Jenny Tranfield (quarterfinals)
11. (England) Vicky Botwright (second round)
12. (New Zealand) Shelley Kitchen (quarterfinals)
13. (England) Jenny Duncalf (second round)
14. (France) Isabelle Stoehr (first round)
15. (England) Stephanie Brind (second round)
16. (Republic of Ireland) Madeline Perry (second round)

== Draw and results ==
First round
1	(Australia) Rachael Grinham	9	9	9
Q	(Australia) Melissa Martin	0	4	2
14	(Republic of Ireland) Madeline Perry	9	9	9
(Hong Kong) Rebecca Chiu	4	2	5
7	(England) Fiona Geaves	1	9	4
(England) Tania Bailey	9	10	9
10	(England) Jenny Tranfield	9	9	9
Q	(Australia) Kasey Brown	4	0	0
3	(Netherlands) Vanessa Atkinson	9	5	9	9
(Scotland) Pamela Nimmo	2	9	2	7
11	(England) Vicky Botwright	9	10	8	9
Q	(New Zealand) Tamsyn Leevey	7	8	10	3
5	(England) Linda Elriani	9	9	9
Q	(Egypt) Engy Kheirallah	3	4	1
13	(England) Jenny Duncalf	9	9	9
(United States) Latasha Khan	3	6	3
(England) Laura Lengthorn	6	9	9	9
14	(France) Isabelle Stoehr	9	4	7	7
(Pakistan) Carla Khan	7	3	9	7
8	(England) Rebecca Macree	9	9	7	9
Q	(Canada) Runa Reta	4	9	9	5	4
15	(England) Stephanie Brind	9	2	7	9	9
(Netherlands) Annelize Naudé	8	1	4
4	(Australia) Natalie Grinham	9	9	9
(England) Alison Waters	2	6	9	9	9
9	(Egypt) Omneya Abdel Kawy	9	9	4	3	5
Q	(Wales) Tegwen Malik	3	0	3
6	(Malaysia) Nicol David	9	9	9
Q	(Australia) Amelia Pittock	4	9	1	5
12	(New Zealand) Shelley Kitchen	9	6	9	9
(England) Dominique Lloyd-Walter	1	1	5
2	(England) Cassie Jackman	9	9	9

Second round
1	(Australia) Rachael Grinham	9	9	7	9
14	(Republic of Ireland) Madeline Perry	1	0	9	5
(England) Tania Bailey	9	2	3	6
10	(England) Jenny Tranfield	7	9	9	9
3	(Netherlands) Vanessa Atkinson	9	9	2	9
11	(England) Vicky Botwright	6	6	9	8
5	(England) Linda Elriani	9	9	8	9
13	(England) Jenny Duncalf	5	7	10	2
(England) Laura Lengthorn	5	7	5
8	(England) Rebecca Macree	9	9	9
15	(England) Stephanie Brind	7	4	1
4	(Australia) Natalie Grinham	9	9	9
(England) Alison Waters	8	9	2	8
6	(Malaysia) Nicol David	9	7	9	9
12	(New Zealand) Shelley Kitchen	9	9	9
2	(England) Cassie Jackman	5	4	7

Quarter finals
1	(Australia) Rachael Grinham	9	9	9
10	(England) Jenny Tranfield	1	1	7
3	(Netherlands) Vanessa Atkinson	7	9	9
5	(England) Linda Elriani	9	1	3	rtd
8	(England) Rebecca Macree	6	3	0
4	(Australia) Natalie Grinham	9	9	9
6	(Malaysia) Nicol David	9	9	9
12	(New Zealand) Shelley Kitchen	7	3	4

Semi finals
1	(Australia) Rachael Grinham	0	2	2
3	(Netherlands) Vanessa Atkinson	9	9	9
Final
3	(Netherlands) Vanessa Atkinson	9	9	9
4	(Australia) Natalie Grinham	1	1	5
4	(Australia) Natalie Grinham	9	9	2	9	9
6	(Malaysia) Nicol David	3	7	9	10	7

== See also ==
- World Open
- 2004 Men's World Open Squash Championship

Preceded by Hong Kong; 2003	WISPA World Open; Malaysia (Kuala Lumpur); 2004	Succeeded by Hong Kong; 2005
