= 2006 Women's World Open Squash Championship =

Women's World Open 2006
- 23rd WISPA World Squash Championship
- Location: Belfast, Northern Ireland, UK
- Date: November 22–26, 2006
- Website www.squashtalk.com/html/news/oct06/wispadraw06-10-7.htm

WISPA World Tour
- Category: WISPA World Open
- Prize money: $112,500

Results
- Champion: (Malaysia) Nicol David
- Runner-up: (Australia) Natalie Grinham
- Semi-finalists: (Australia) Rachael Grinham (United States) Natalie Grainger

The 2006 Women's World Open Squash Championship is the women's edition of the World Open, which serves as the individual world championship for squash players. The event took place in the Ulster Hall in Belfast, Northern Ireland from 22 to 26 November 2006. Nicol David won her second World Open title, beating Natalie Grinham in the final.

== Ranking points ==
In 2006, the points breakdown were as follows:

World Open (2006)
Event	W	F	SF	QF	2R	1R
Points (WISPA)	4800	3300	1950	1050	525	300

== Seeds ==
1. (Malaysia) Nicol David (champion)
2. (Netherlands) Vanessa Atkinson (second round)
3. (Australia) Rachael Grinham (semifinals)
4. (Australia) Natalie Grinham (final)
5. (England) Vicky Botwright (second round)
6. (England) Jenny Duncalf (first round)
7. (England) Tania Bailey (quarterfinals)
8. (Republic of Ireland) Madeline Perry (quarterfinals)
9. (Egypt) Omneya Abdel Kawy (quarterfinals)
10. (England) Alison Waters (second round)
11. (England) Laura Lengthorn-Massaro (second round)
12. (Egypt) Engy Kheirallah (first round)
13. (New Zealand) Shelley Kitchen (second round)
14. (United States) Natalie Grainger (semifinals)
15. (Hong Kong) Rebecca Chiu (second round)
16. (Netherlands) Annelize Naudé (first round)

== Draw & results ==
First round
1	(Malaysia) N David	9	9	9
Q	(England) L Briggs	4	5	4
12	(Egypt) E Kheirallah	5	5	1
Q	(Mexico) S Terán	9	9	9
5	(England) V Botwright	10	9	9
(France) I Stoehr	8	2	5
9	(Egypt) O A Kawy	9	9	9
Q	(Australia) A Pittock	4	7	5
3	(Australia) R Grinham	9	9	8	10
(Egypt) R E Weleily	1	5	10	8
15	(Hong Kong) R Chiu	9	9	10
(Republic of Ireland) L Mylotte	1	2	9
6	(England) J Duncalf	4	4	9
Q	(Guyana) N Fernandes	9	9	10
11	(England) L L-Massaro	9	9	9
Q	(South Africa) T Swartz	0	2	1
Q	(England) B Botwright	1	8	5
10	(England) A Waters	9	10	9
(Malaysia) S Wee	5	1	3
7	(England) T Bailey	9	9	9
Q	(Wales) T Malik	4	6	5
13	(New Zealand) S Kitchen	9	9	9
Q	(New Zealand) J Hawkes	0	1	4
4	(Australia) N Grinham	9	9	9
(Australia) K Brown	9	5	10	9
16	(Netherlands) A Naudé	1	9	9	7
(Republic of Ireland) A Blake	3	5	0
8	(Republic of Ireland) M Perry	9	9	9
(Scotland) P Nimmo	3	3	r
14	(United States) N Grainger	9	9	r
(England) D L-Walter	2	6	0
2	(Netherlands) V Atkinson	9	9	9

Second round
1	(Malaysia) N David	9	9	9
Q	(Mexico) S Terán	0	3	2
5	(England) V Botwright	9	9	7
9	(Egypt) O A Kawy	10	10	9
3	(Australia) R Grinham	9	9	9
15	(Hong Kong) R Chiu	2	4	3
Q	(Guyana) N Fernandes	0	3	2
11	(England) L L-Massaro	9	9	9
10	(England) A Waters	9	4	0	0
7	(England) T Bailey	6	4	9	9
13	(New Zealand) S Kitchen	4	1	4
4	(Australia) N Grinham	9	9	9
(Australia) K Brown	7	0	9	2
8	(Republic of Ireland) M Perry	9	9	5	9
14	(United States) N Grainger	6	2	9	9	9
2	(Netherlands) V Atkinson	9	9	2	1	7

Quarter finals
1	(Malaysia) N David	10	9	9
9	(Egypt) O A Kawy	8	2	4
3	(Australia) R Grinham	9	9	9
11	(England) L L-Massaro	2	3	6
7	(England) T Bailey	5	8	5
4	(Australia) N Grinham	9	10	9
8	(Republic of Ireland) M Perry	2	4	5
14	(United States) N Grainger	9	9	9

Semi finals
1	(Malaysia) N David	9	9	9
3	(Australia) R Grinham	7	1	1
Final
1	(Malaysia) N David	1	9	3	9	9
4	(Australia) N Grinham	9	7	9	5	2
4	(Australia) N Grinham	9	10	9
14	(United States) N Grainger	4	8	6

Note: * Q = Qualifier, * WC = Wild Card, * w/o = Walkover, * r = Retired

== See also ==
- World Open
- 2006 Men's World Open Squash Championship
- 2006 Women's World Team Squash Championships

Preceded by Hong Kong; 2005	WISPA World Open; Northern Ireland (Belfast); 2006	Succeeded by Spain (Madrid) 2007
