= 2003 Women's World Open Squash Championship =

Women's World Open 2003
- 19th WISPA World Squash Championship
- Location: Hong Kong
- Date(s): December 07–13, 2003

WISPA World Tour
- Category: WISPA World Open
- Prize money: $57,500

Results
- Champion: (New Zealand) Carol Owens
- Runner-up: (England) Cassie Jackman
- Semi-finalists: (Netherlands) Vanessa Atkinson (Malaysia) Nicol David

The 2003 Women's Credit-Suisse Privilege World Open Squash Championship was the women's edition of the 2003 World Open, which serves as the individual world championship for squash players. The event took place in Hong Kong from 7 December until 13 December 2003. Carol Owens won her second World Open title, defeating Cassie Jackman in the final.

== Seeds ==
1. (New Zealand) Carol Owens (champion)
2. (United States) Natalie Grainger (second round)
3. (Australia) Rachael Grinham (quarterfinals)
4. (England) Cassie Jackman (final)
5. (England) Linda Charman (quarterfinals)
6. (Netherlands) Vanessa Atkinson (semifinals)
7. (Australia) Natalie Grinham (quarterfinals)
8. (England) Tania Bailey (first round)
9. (England) Rebecca Macree (second round)
10. (England) Jenny Tranfield (second round)
11. (England) Vicky Botwright (second round)
12. (England) Stephanie Brind (second round)
13. (England) Fiona Geaves (quarterfinals)
14. (Egypt) Omneya Abdel Kawy (second round)
15. (New Zealand) Shelley Kitchen (second round)
16. (England) Jenny Duncalf (first round)

== Draw and results ==
First round
1	(New Zealand) Carol Owens	9	9	9
(Pakistan) Carla Khan	2	6	3
11	(England) Vicky Botwright	9	9	5	9
(Egypt) Engy Kheirallah	5	6	9	1
7	(Australia) Natalie Grinham	9	9	9
(England) Vicky Lankester	0	0	3
12	(England) Stephanie Brind	9	9	9
(United States) Latasha Khan	7	4	4
6	(Netherlands) Vanessa Atkinson	9	9	9
(Scotland) Wendy Maitland	2	2	4
9	(England) Rebecca Macree	9	9	5	9
(Hong Kong) Rebecca Chiu	7	5	9	4
3	(Australia) Rachael Grinham	9	9	9
(England) Alison Waters	3	1	1
10	(England) Jenny Tranfield	9	9	9
(Scotland) Pamela Nimmo	0	2	1
2	(United States) Natalie Grainger	9	9	9
(England) Laura Lengthorn	9	9	9
14	(Egypt) Omneya Abdel Kawy	0	2	3
(Malaysia) Nicol David	4	1	7
13	(England) Fiona Geaves	9	9	9
(Belgium) Kim Hannes-Teunen	5	1	1
(France) Isabelle Stoehr	w/o
8	(England) Tania Bailey	scr
4	(England) Cassie Jackman	9	4	9
(Malaysia) Sharon Wee	7	9	7	5
15	(New Zealand) Shelley Kitchen	9	9	9
(New Zealand) Tamsyn Leevey	1	2	4
5	(England) Linda Charman	9	9	9
(Netherlands) Annelize Naudé	1	2	4
(Republic of Ireland) Madeline Perry	9	9	9
16	(England) Jenny Duncalf	7	5	2

Second round
1	(New Zealand) Owens	9	9	9
11	(England) Botwright	5	3	3
7	(Australia) N Grinham	9	9	9
12	(England) Brind	2	3	2
6	(Netherlands) Atkinson	9	3	9	4
9	(England) Macree	0	9	2	9	ret
3	(Australia) R Grinham	9	9	9
10	(England) Tranfield	3	1	3
2	(United States) Grainger	9	3	5	7
(Malaysia) David	4	9	9	9
13	(England) Geaves	9	9	9	9
(France) Stoehr	10	4	5	3
4	(England) Jackman	9	9	9
15	(New Zealand) Kitchen	2	0	6
5	(England) Charman	10	9	9
(Republic of Ireland) Perry	8	1	0

Quarter-finals
1	(New Zealand) Owens	9	9	9
7	(Australia) N Grinham	6	3	1
6	(Netherlands) Atkinson	9	9	3	10
3	(Australia) R Grinham	1	0	9	8
(Malaysia) David	9	9	2	9
13	(England) Geaves	4	1	9	9
4	(England) Jackman	9	9	9
5	(England) Charman	5	2	3

Semi-finals
1	(New Zealand) Owens	9	9	9	9
6	(Netherlands) Atkinson	9	7	6	6
Final
1	(New Zealand) Owens	3	9	9	9
4	(England) Jackman	9	2	7	3
(Malaysia) David	7	3	4
4	(England) Jackman	9	9	9

=== Notes ===
Sarah Fitzgerald did not defend her title after retiring from competitive play.
Natalie Pohrer change her name back to Natalie Grainger and represented the United States after changing nationality.

== See also ==
- World Open
- 2003 Men's World Open Squash Championship

Preceded by Doha (Qatar); 2002	World Open; Hong Kong; 2003	Succeeded by Kuala Lumpur (Malaysia); 2004
