= 2008 Women's World Open Squash Championship =

Women's World Open 2008
- 25th WISPA World Squash Championship
- Location: Manchester, England, UK
- Date: 11–19 October 2008
- Website squashsite.co.uk/world_open_2008.htm

WISPA World Tour
- Category: WISPA World Open
- Prize money: $114,000

Results
- Champion: (Malaysia) Nicol David
- Runner-up: (England) Vicky Botwright
- Semi-finalists: (Republic of Ireland) Madeline Perry (England) Jenny Duncalf

The 2008 Women's World Open Squash Championship is the women's edition of the World Open, which serves as the individual world championship for squash players. The event took place at the National Squash Centre in Manchester, England from 11 to 19 October 2008.

== Ranking points ==
In 2008, the points breakdown were as follows:

World Open (2008)
Event	W	F	SF	QF	2R	1R
Points (WISPA)	4800	3300	1950	1050	525	300

== Seeds ==
1. (Malaysia) Nicol David (champion)
2. (Australia) Rachael Grinham (second round)
3. (Netherlands) Natalie Grinham (quarter-finals)
4. (United States) Natalie Grainger (second round)
5. (England) Jenny Duncalf (semi-finals, retired due to injury)
6. (New Zealand) Shelley Kitchen (second round)
7. (England) Alison Waters (quarter-finals)
8. (England) Laura Lengthorn-Massaro (second round)
9. (Egypt) Omneya Abdel Kawy (quarter-finals)
10. (Netherlands) Vanessa Atkinson (first round)
11. (England) Vicky Botwright (final)
12. (Australia) Kasey Brown (second round)
13. (Hong Kong) Rebecca Chiu (second round)
14. (Republic of Ireland) Madeline Perry (semi-finals)
15. (France) Isabelle Stoehr (second round)
16. (Mexico) Samantha Terán (first round)

== Draw and results ==
First round
1	(Malaysia) N David	11	11	11
(Malaysia) S Wee	6	3	2
13	(Hong Kong) R Chiu	8	6	11	11	11
(England) L Briggs	11	11	5	6	6
8	(England) L L-Massaro	12	13	11
(Netherlands) A Naudé	10	11	6
9	(Egypt) O A Kawy	11	12	12
Q	(Denmark) L Hansen	6	10	10
4	(United States) N Grainger	11	11	11
Q	(Canada) A Miller	5	6	2
10	(Netherlands) V Atkinson	9	7	11	12	5
(New Zealand) J Hawkes	11	11	8	10	11
6	(New Zealand) S Kitchen	11	11	11
Q	(Malaysia) D Arnold	7	7	4
14	(Republic of Ireland) M Perry	6	11	13	11
(Egypt) E Kheirallah	11	8	11	5
Q	(Malaysia) L W Wern	5	13	4	11
12	(Australia) K Brown	11	11	11	13
(Egypt) R E Weleily	3	11	12	7
5	(England) J Duncalf	11	6	14	11
Q	(Hong Kong) A Au	11	11	3	11
16	(Mexico) S Terán	5	4	11	5
(England) D L-Walter	5	6	9
3	(Netherlands) N Grinham	11	11	11
Q	(England) S Kippax	5	6	5
15	(France) I Stoehr	11	11	11
Q	(United States) L Khan	9	6	14	4
7	(England) A Waters	11	11	12	11
Q	(Italy) M Manetta	5	7	2
11	(England) V Botwright	11	11	11
(New Zealand) L Crome	7	6	2
2	(Australia) R Grinham	11	11	11

Second round
1	(Malaysia) N David	11	11	11
13	(Hong Kong) R Chiu	3	8	7
8	(England) L L-Massaro	23	17	14	6	7
9	(Egypt) O A Kawy	21	19	12	11	11
4	(United States) N Grainger	11	11	9	10	9
(New Zealand) J Hawkes	6	5	11	12	11
6	(New Zealand) S Kitchen	5	6	2
14	(Republic of Ireland) M Perry	11	11	11
12	(Australia) K Brown	8	2	11
5	(England) J Duncalf	11	11	13
Q	(Hong Kong) A Au	6	7	4
3	(Netherlands) N Grinham	11	11	11
15	(France) I Stoehr	3	1	7
7	(England) A Waters	11	11	11
11	(England) V Botwright	5	13	11	11
2	(Australia) R Grinham	11	11	8	8

Quarter-finals
1	(Malaysia) N David	11	11	11
9	(Egypt) O A Kawy	8	1	9
(New Zealand) J Hawkes	11	11	9	10	9
14	(Republic of Ireland) M Perry	6	5	11	12	11
5	(England) J Duncalf	11	10	5	11	11
3	(Netherlands) N Grinham	8	12	11	6	7
7	(England) A Waters	11	11	11	9
11	(England) V Botwright	13	5	13	11

Semi-finals
1	(Malaysia) N David	11	11	11
14	(Republic of Ireland) M Perry	6	8	6
Final
1	(Malaysia) N David	5	11	11	11
11	(England) V Botwright	11	1	6	9
5	(England) J Duncalf	3	6	r
11	(England) V Botwright	11	11	r

Note: * Q = Qualifier, * WC = Wild Card, * w/o = Walkover, * r = Retired

== See also ==
- World Open
- 2008 Men's World Open Squash Championship
- 2008 Women's World Team Squash Championships

Preceded by Spain (Madrid); 2007	WISPA World Open; England (Manchester); 2008	Succeeded by Netherlands (Amsterdam) 2009
