= 2009 Women's World Open Squash Championship =

Women's World Open 2009
- 26th WISPA World Squash Championship
- Location: Amsterdam, Netherlands
- Date(s): September 20–27, 2009
- Website www.squash.me.uk/wwo

WISPA World Tour
- Category: WISPA World Open
- Prize money: $118,000

Results
- Champion: (Malaysia) Nicol David
- Runner-up: (Netherlands) Natalie Grinham
- Semi-finalists: (Australia) Rachael Grinham (England) Alison Waters

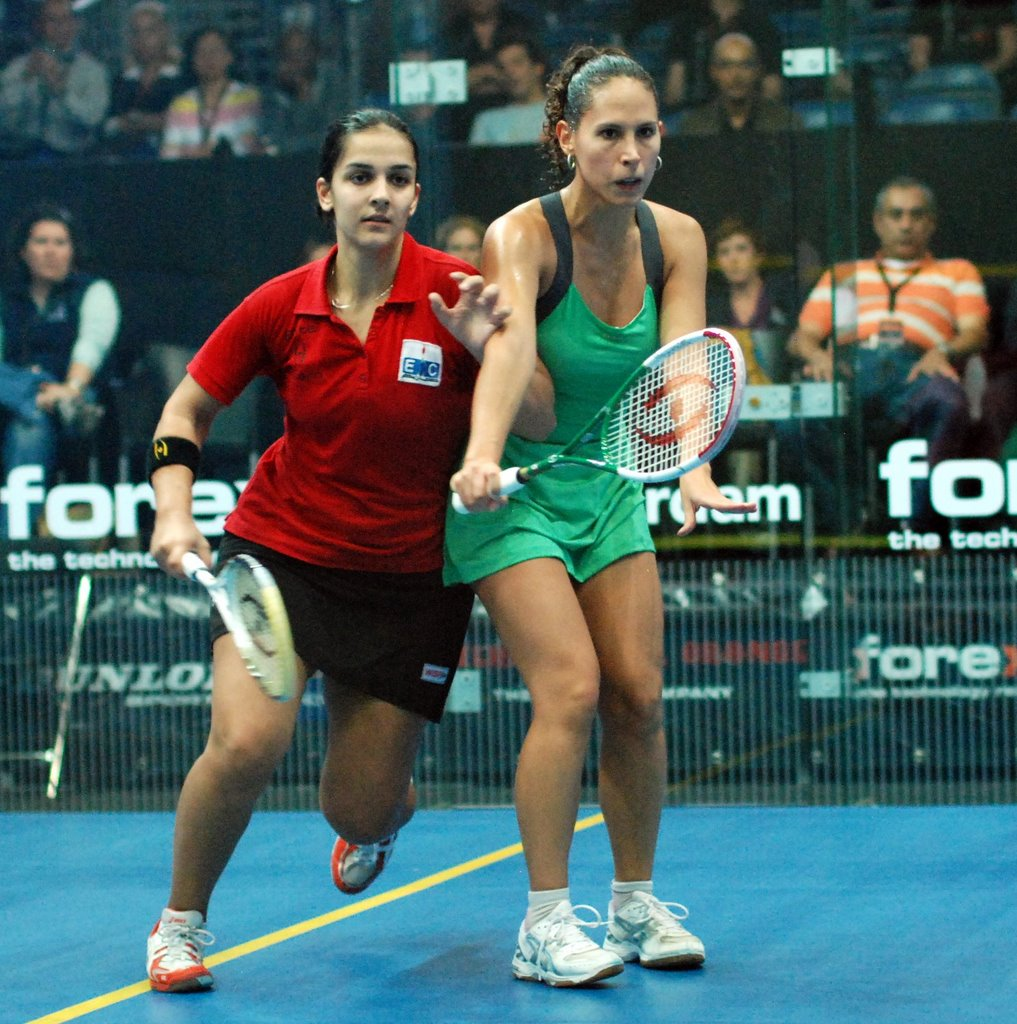
Omneya Abdel Kawy and Samantha Terán during their 2nd round

The 2009 Women's World Open Squash Championship is the women's edition of the World Open, which serves as the individual world championship for squash players. The championship is part of the WISPA Platinum series of the Women's International Squash Players' Association (WISPA) World Tour. The event took place in Amsterdam in the Netherlands from 20 to 27 September 2009.

== Ranking points ==
In 2009, the points breakdown were as follows:

World Open (2009)
Event	W	F	SF	QF	2R	1R
Points (WISPA)	5300	3630	2150	1150	575	330

== Seeds ==
1. (Malaysia) Nicol David (champion)
2. (Netherlands) Natalie Grinham (final)
3. (Australia) Rachael Grinham (semifinals)
4. (England) Alison Waters (semifinals)
5. (England) Jenny Duncalf (quarterfinals)
6. (Egypt) Omneya Abdel Kawy (quarterfinals)
7. (Republic of Ireland) Madeline Perry (quarterfinals)
8. (England) Laura Lengthorn-Massaro (quarterfinals)
9. (France) Isabelle Stoehr (first round)
10. (Australia) Kasey Brown (second round)
11. (Netherlands) Vanessa Atkinson (second round)
12. (Hong Kong) Annie Au (second round)
13. (Hong Kong) Rebecca Chiu (second round)
14. (New Zealand) Jaclyn Hawkes (first round)
15. (Mexico) Samantha Terán (second round)
16. (Egypt) Raneem El Weleily (second round)

== Draw and results ==
First round
1	(Malaysia) N David	11	11	11
WC	(Netherlands) O Noom	6	4	6
9	(France) I Stoehr	8	13	7	7
(France) C Serme	11	11	11	11
5	(England) J Duncalf	11	11	11
(Malaysia) D Arnold	4	3	4
14	(New Zealand) J Hawkes	10	7	13	8
(Egypt) E Kheirallah	12	11	11	11
4	(England) A Waters	11	11	11
Q	(England) S Kippax	6	3	4
16	(Egypt) R E Weleily	11	11	11
Q	(India) J Chinappa	5	4	6
7	(Republic of Ireland) M Perry	11	11	9	11
Q	(United States) L Khan	3	3	11	5
13	(Hong Kong) R Chiu	2	11	11	6	11
Q	(United States) A Sobhy	11	9	3	11	6
(England) S Pierrepont	11	0	7	7
15	(Mexico) S Terán	6	11	11	11
Q	(Egypt) N E Tayeb	7	9	11	4
6	(Egypt) O A Kawy	11	11	9	11
(England) T Bailey	10	11	5	5
11	(Netherlands) V Atkinson	12	8	11	11
(England) D-L Walter	5	7	4
3	(Australia) R Grinham	11	11	11
Q	(Australia) D Urquhart	11	9	2	3
12	(Hong Kong) A Au	8	11	11	11
Q	(Hong Kong) J Chan	6	6	8
8	(England) L L-Massaro	11	11	11
Q	(Republic of Ireland) A Blake	7	11	6	11	1
10	(Australia) K Brown	11	6	11	7	11
(England) L Briggs	1	3	5
2	(Netherlands) N Grinham	11	11	11

Second round
1	(Malaysia) N David	11	11	11
(France) C Serme	3	5	0
5	(England) J Duncalf	11	11	11
(Egypt) E Kheirallah	9	9	9
4	(England) A Waters	10	11	11	11	11
16	(Egypt) R E Weleily	12	7	5	13	7
7	(Republic of Ireland) M Perry	11	11	11
13	(Hong Kong) R Chiu	8	4	5
15	(Mexico) S Terán	11	9	7	9
6	(Egypt) O A Kawy	8	11	11	11
11	(Netherlands) V Atkinson	11	11	6	6	3
3	(Australia) R Grinham	7	8	11	11	11
12	(Hong Kong) A Au	11	9	7	9
8	(England) L L-Massaro	8	11	11	11
10	(Australia) K Brown	4	8	8
2	(Netherlands) N Grinham	11	11	11

Quarter finals
1	(Malaysia) N David	11	11	11	11
5	(England) J Duncalf	6	13	6	7
4	(England) A Waters	11	11	11	11
7	(Republic of Ireland) M Perry	5	8	13	2
6	(Egypt) O A Kawy	11	11	1	6	8
3	(Australia) R Grinham	6	7	11	11	11
8	(England) L L-Massaro	6	4	6
2	(Netherlands) N Grinham	11	11	11

Semi finals
1	(Malaysia) N David	4	11	15	11
4	(England) A Waters	11	6	13	7
Final
1	(Malaysia) N David	3	11	11	11
2	(Netherlands) N Grinham	11	6	3	8
3	(Australia) R Grinham	13	6	6	4
2	(Netherlands) N Grinham	11	11	11	11

Note: * Q = Qualifier, * WC = Wild Card, * w/o = Walkover, * r = Retired

== See also ==
- World Open
- 2009 Men's World Open Squash Championship

Preceded by England (Manchester); 2008	WISPA World Open; Netherlands (Amsterdam); 2009	Succeeded by Egypt (Sharm el-Sheikh) 2010
