= Squash at the World Games =

- Squash
- Frequency: Every four years
- Inaugurated: 1997 (Finland) Lahti
- Most recent: 2022 (United States) Birmingham, Alabama
- Next event: 2025 (China) Chengdu
- Best nation: France

Squash has been part of the World Games since 1997 and has been held at every edition since except in 2001.

== Medal table ==
Rank	Nation	Gold	Silver	Bronze	Total
1	France (FRA)	4	4	3	11
2	Malaysia (MAS)	3	0	2	5
3	Great Britain (GBR)	2	2	3	7
4	Germany (GER)	1	2	0	3
5	Australia (AUS)	1	1	0	2
6	Egypt (EGY)	1	0	2	3
7	Belgium (BEL)	1	0	0	1
7	Japan (JPN)	1	0	0	1
9	Netherlands (NED)	0	2	0	2
10	Hong Kong (HKG)	0	1	0	1
10	Hungary (HUN)	0	1	0	1
10	Ireland (IRL)	0	1	0	1
13	Colombia (COL)	0	0	3	3
14	Canada (CAN)	0	0	1	1
14	New Zealand (NZL)	0	0	1	1
14	Spain (ESP)	0	0	1	1
Totals (16 entries)		14	14	16	44

== Medalists ==
=== Men ===
Games	Location	Gold	Silver	Bronze
1997	(Finland) Lahti	Ahmed Barada (EGY)	Derek Ryan (IRL)	Graham Ryding (CAN)
2001	(Japan) Akita	Not Held		
2005	(Germany) Duisburg	Peter Nicol (GBR)	Thierry Lincou (FRA)	Nick Matthew (GBR); James Willstrop (GBR)
2009	(Taiwan) Kaohsiung	Nick Matthew (GBR)	James Willstrop (GBR)	Mohd Azlan Iskandar (MAS)
2013	(Colombia) Cali	Grégory Gaultier (FRA)	Simon Rösner (GER)	Miguel Ángel Rodríguez (COL)
2017	(Poland) Wrocław	Simon Rösner (GER)	Grégoire Marche (FRA)	Mathieu Castagnet (FRA)
2022	(United States) Birmingham	Victor Crouin (FRA)	Grégoire Marche (FRA)	Miguel Ángel Rodríguez (COL)
2025	(China) Chengdu	Victor Crouin (FRA)	Balázs Farkas (HUN)	Miguel Ángel Rodríguez (COL)

=== Women ===
Games	Location	Gold	Silver	Bronze
1997	(Finland) Lahti	Sarah Fitz-Gerald (AUS)	Sabine Schöne (GER)	Leilani Joyce (NZL)
2001	(Japan) Akita	Not Held		
2005	(Germany) Duisburg	Nicol David (MAS)	Rachael Grinham (AUS)	Omneya Abdel Kawy (EGY); Linda Elriani (GBR)
2009	(Taiwan) Kaohsiung	Nicol David (MAS)	Natalie Grinham (NED)	Omneya Abdel Kawy (EGY)
2013	(Colombia) Cali	Nicol David (MAS)	Natalie Grinham (NED)	Camille Serme (FRA)
2017	(Poland) Wrocław	Camille Serme (FRA)	Joey Chan (HKG)	Nicol David (MAS)
2022	(United States) Birmingham	Tinne Gilis (BEL)	Lucy Beecroft (GBR)	Coline Aumard (FRA)
2025	(China) Chengdu	Satomi Watanabe (JPN)	Marie Stephan (FRA)	Marta Domínguez (ESP)

== Participating nations ==
A total of 45 nations competed in squash on all World Games :

- Argentina (1)
- Australia (6)
- Austria (2)
- Brazil (2)
- Belgium (2)
- (British Virgin Islands) British Virgin Island (2)
- Canada (5)
- China (1)
- Chinese Taipei (1)
- Colombia (3)
- Czech Republic (2)
- Denmark (1)
- Ecuador (1)
- Egypt (4)
- Spain (2)
- Finland (2)
- France (5)
- Germany (6)
- (United Kingdom) Great Britain (6)
- Guatemala (1)
- Guyana (1)
- Hong Kong (3)
- Hungary (5)
- India (2)
- (Republic of Ireland) Ireland (3)
- Italy (1)
- Japan (4)
- Jamaica (1)
- Kuwait (1)
- Latvia (1)
- Malaysia (4)
- Mexico (4)
- Netherlands (3)
- New Zealand (2)
- Pakistan (1)
- Peru (3)
- Poland (2)
- Romania (1)
- Russia (2)
- South Africa (2)
- South Korea (1)
- Switzerland (2)
- Sweden (1)
- Ukraine (2)
- United States (4)

== See also ==
- World Squash
- Squash at the Summer Olympics
