= Squash at the 2009 World Games – women's singles =

2009 World Games - Squash Single Women
Host	(Taiwan) Kaohsiung
Dates	July 21–24, 2009
Teams	31
Podium
Champion	(Malaysia) Nicol David
Runners-up	(Netherlands) Natalie Grinham
Third place	(Egypt) Omneya A. Kawy
Fourth place	(United Kingdom) Alison Waters

The Squash - Single Women competition at the World Games 2009 took place from July 21 to July 24 at the Chung Cheng Martial Arts Stadium in Kaohsiung, Taiwan.

== Seeds ==
1. (Malaysia) Nicol David (champion)
2. (Netherlands) Natalie Grinham (final)
3. (United Kingdom) Jenny Duncalf (quarterfinals)
4. (United Kingdom) Alison Waters (semifinals)
5. (Egypt) Omneya Abdel Kawy (semifinals)
6. (France) Isabelle Stoehr (first round)
7. (New Zealand) Shelley Kitchen (round of 16)
8. (Netherlands) Vanessa Atkinson (round of 16)

== Draw ==
First Round
1	(Malaysia) Nicol David	3
(Hungary) Helga Kecsa-Nagy	0
(India) Joshna Chinappa	3
15	(Malaysia) Sharon Wee	2
16	(Republic of Ireland) Aisling Blake	0
(Hong Kong) Joey Chan	3
(Australia) Amelia Pittock	3
6	(France) Isabelle Stoehr	2
5	(Egypt) Omneya Abdel Kawy	3
(Austria) Birgit Coufal	0
(Australia) Donna Urquhart	2
12	(New Zealand) Jaclyn Hawkes	3
10	(Hong Kong) Rebecca Chiu	3
(Australia) Lisa Camilleri	1
(Germany) Pamela Hathway	0
3	(United Kingdom) Jenny Duncalf	3
4	(United Kingdom) Alison Waters	3
(South Africa) Siyoli Lusaseni	0
10	(Mexico) Samantha Terán	3
(Malaysia) Low Wee Wern	0
(Japan) Chinatsu Matsui	1
8	(Netherlands) Vanessa Atkinson	3
7	(New Zealand) Shelley Kitchen	3
(South Korea) Song Sun-mi	0
(France) Camille Serme	1
9	(Australia) Kasey Brown	3
14	(Malaysia) Delia Arnold	2
(Canada) Miranda Ranieri	3
(Chinese Taipei) Pan Kuei-Yeh	0
2	(Netherlands) Natalie Grinham	3

Round of 16
1	(Malaysia) Nicol David	3
(India) Joshna Chinappa	0
(Hong Kong) Joey Chan	3
(Australia) Amelia Pittock	2
5	(Egypt) Omneya Abdel Kawy	3
12	(New Zealand) Jaclyn Hawkes	0
10	(Hong Kong) Rebecca Chiu	1
3	(United Kingdom) Jenny Duncalf	3
4	(United Kingdom) Alison Waters	3
13	(Egypt) Raneem El Weleily	0
11	(Mexico) Samantha Terán	3
8	(Netherlands) Vanessa Atkinson	1
7	(New Zealand) Shelley Kitchen	2
9	(Australia) Kasey Brown	3
(Canada) Miranda Ranieri	0
2	(Netherlands) Natalie Grinham	3

Quarter finals
1	(Malaysia) Nicol David	3
(Hong Kong) Joey Chan	0
5	(Egypt) Omneya Abdel Kawy	3
3	(United Kingdom) Jenny Duncalf	1
4	(United Kingdom) Alison Waters	3
11	(Mexico) Samantha Terán	1
9	(Australia) Kasey Brown	0
2	(Netherlands) Natalie Grinham	3

Semi finals
1	(Malaysia) Nicol David	3
6	(Egypt) Omneya Abdel Kawy	0
4	(United Kingdom) Alison Waters	2
2	(Netherlands) Natalie Grinham	3

Finals
1	(Malaysia) Nicol David	3
2	(Netherlands) Natalie Grinham	0

Note: * w/d = Withdraw, * w/o = Walkover, * r = Retired

3rd place
5	(Egypt) Omneya Abdel Kawy	3
4	(United Kingdom) Alison Waters	2
