= Nicol David =

Malaysian squash player (born 1983)

Yang Berbahagia Datuk Nicol Ann David DB DSPN PJN KMN AMN
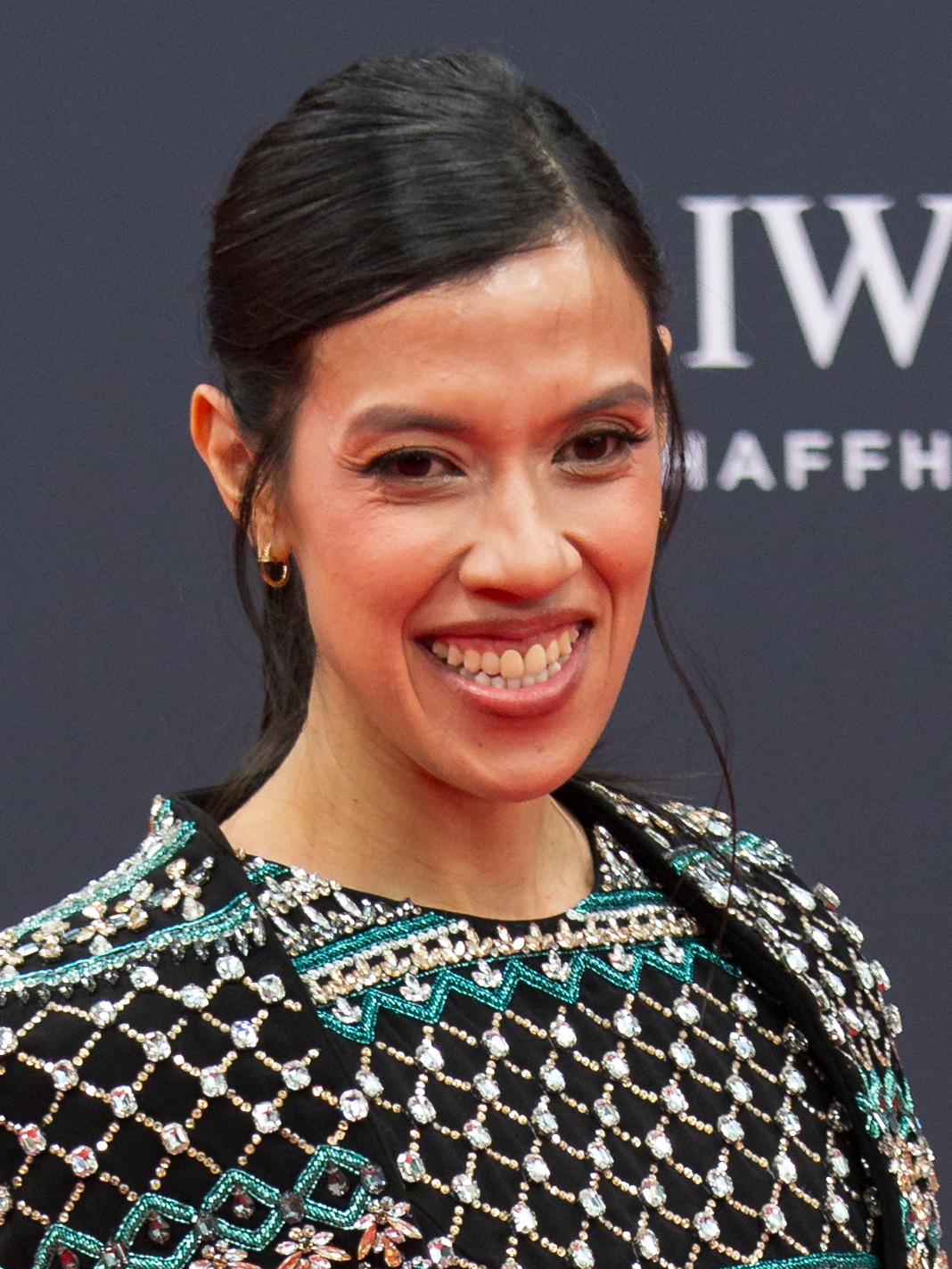

Personal information
- Full name: Nicol Ann David
- Nickname: Duracell Bunny
- Born: 26 August 1983 (age 43) Penang, Malaysia
- Height: 1.62 m (5 ft 4 in)
- Weight: 55 kg (121 lb)
- Website: www.nicoldavid.com

Sport
- Country: Malaysia
- Handedness: Right handed
- Turned pro: 2000
- Coached by: Liz Irving
- Retired: 2019
- Racquet used: Wilson

Women's singles
- Highest ranking: No. 1 (January, 2006)
- Title: 81
- Tour final: 102
- World Open: W (2005, 2006, 2008, 2009, 2010, 2011, 2012, 2014)
Medal record
Women's squash
Representing Malaysia
Event	1st	2nd	3rd
World Championships	8	0	3
World Team Championships	0	1	4
World Games	3	0	1
Commonwealth Games	2	1	1
Asian Games	7	1	1
Total	20	3	10
World Championships
Gold medal – first place	2005 Hong Kong	Singles
Gold medal – first place	2006 Belfast	Singles
Gold medal – first place	2008 Manchester	Singles
Gold medal – first place	2009 Amsterdam	Singles
Gold medal – first place	2010 Sharm El Sheikh	Singles
Gold medal – first place	2011 Rotterdam	Singles
Gold medal – first place	2012 Grand Cayman	Singles
Gold medal – first place	2014 Cairo	Singles
Bronze medal – third place	2003 Hong Kong	Singles
Bronze medal – third place	2004 Kuala Lumpur	Singles
Bronze medal – third place	2013 Penang	Singles
World Team Championships
Silver medal – second place	2014 Niagara-on-the-Lake	Team
Bronze medal – third place	2006 Edmonton	Team
Bronze medal – third place	2008 Cairo	Team
Bronze medal – third place	2010 Palmerston	Team
Bronze medal – third place	2012 Nîmes	Team
World Games
Gold medal – first place	2005 Duisburg	Singles
Gold medal – first place	2009 Kaohsiung	Singles
Gold medal – first place	2013 Cali	Singles
Bronze medal – third place	2017 Wrocław	Singles
Commonwealth Games
Gold medal – first place	2010 Delhi	Singles
Gold medal – first place	2014 Glasgow	Singles
Silver medal – second place	2002 Manchester	Mixed doubles
Bronze medal – third place	2010 Delhi	Mixed doubles
Asian Games
Gold medal – first place	1998 Bangkok	Singles
Gold medal – first place	2006 Doha	Singles
Gold medal – first place	2010 Guangzhou	Singles
Gold medal – first place	2010 Guangzhou	Team
Gold medal – first place	2014 Incheon	Singles
Gold medal – first place	2014 Incheon	Team
Gold medal – first place	2018 Jakarta-Palembang	Singles
Silver medal – second place	2002 Busan	Singles
Bronze medal – third place	2018 Jakarta-Palembang	Team
SEA Games
Gold medal – first place	2001 Kuala Lumpur	Singles
Gold medal – first place	2001 Kuala Lumpur	Teams
- Updated on November 2026

Nicol Ann David (born August 26, 1983) is a Malaysian retired professional squash player. She was the world number one for a record-breaking 108 consecutive months, ceding the ranking in September 2015 to Raneem El Weleily. She has won the World Open title a record 8 times in 2005, 2006, 2008, 2009, 2010, 2011, 2012 and 2014, as well as the British Open title in 2005, 2006, 2008, 2012 and 2014. In July 2016, she reached her 151st successive month in the top 10, breaking the record in both men's and women's category. She surpassed Peter Nicol's records of 150 months. David is the first squash player to have won the World Junior title twice; in 1999 and 2001 under Richard Glanfield.

She remained the only female squash player to have achieved this until Raneem El Weleily won her second World Junior Championship in 2007. David joined WISPA and turned professional in 2000 when she won her first WISPA title, after only a month on the tour. The victory came in February, when she defeated Salma Shabana in the final of the Savcor Finnish Open. On 7 June 2008, David was honoured with the Order of Merit in conjunction with the birthday of the His Majesty Tuanku Mizan Zainal Abidin. She was the first recipient of the award which was established on 26 June 1975. David was also invited to carry the Olympic torch for Malaysia during the build up to the Athens Olympics in 2004 and appointed as UNDP National Goodwill Ambassador for Malaysia.

Considered by some the greatest women's squash player, David's other notable achievements include the Asian Squash Championship, which she won a record nine times (in 1998, 2000, 2002, 2004, 2006, 2008, 2010, 2011 and 2015). She also held a 13-month, 51-match winning streak, from March 2006 until April 2007, when she finally lost to Natalie Grinham in the final of the 2007 Seoul Open. David has also obtained the WSA Player of the Year on seven occasions, 2005–2010 and 2012. In a poll conducted in 2018 by the Professional Squash Association, David was voted by fans as the greatest squash player of all time in the women's category. In February 2019, Nicol announced her retirement plan, and decided to retire at the end of the 2018/2019 PSA season in June. In another poll conducted by the World Games in 2021, David was crowned as the World Games Greatest Athlete of All Time with receiving a total of 318,943 votes and being the only Malaysian and Asian athlete among 24 candidates.

== Personal life ==
Born in Penang, David is the daughter of Ann Marie David, a retired Malaysian Chinese school teacher of Hokkien-Hakka descent and Desmond David, a Malaysian Indian engineer of Tamil descent, who is also a former state athlete and footballer. She has two sisters, Lianne and Cheryl, both of whom are accomplished squash players at the national level. As a youngster, mathematics was David's best subject at school; she dreamed of one day becoming an engineer. Her primary education was at Sekolah Kebangsaan Convent Green Lane (Convent Green Lane Primary School). David scored seven As in her Penilaian Menengah Rendah (PMR) and seven As in her Sijil Pelajaran Malaysia (SPM); the equivalent to GCSE, which she studied at Convent Green Lane Secondary School in Green Lane, Penang. She was raised a Roman Catholic.

== Squash career ==
=== Pre–2000: Junior years ===
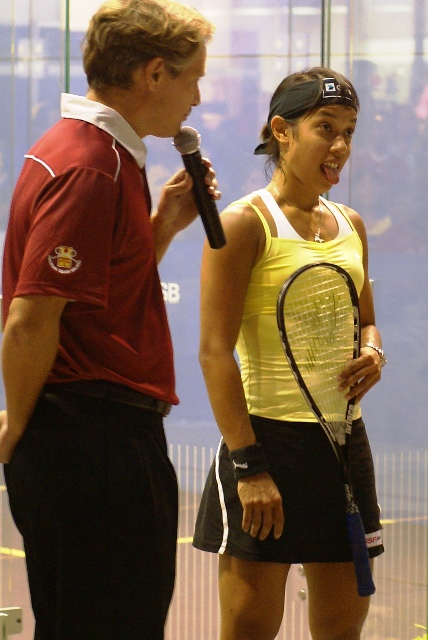
Nicol Ann David during CIMB Malaysian Open Squash 2008 in Kuala Lumpur.

David played squash when she was five years old, and received coaching at the age of eight. While training at the Bukit Dumbar Squash Centre, David was talent spotted by Ee Phoeh Hoon, who led her to represent her home state of Penang, along with her sisters. David's squash career began in 1992 when she won silver in the Under-14 category of the Penang State Junior Championship. Her first national level victory was also in 1992 at the Milo-Dunlop Sport National Junior Interstate Championship, where she won silver in the Under-16 category. In 1994, David was chosen to join the Penang state squash team for the Malaysian Games (SUKMA) tournament where she helped Penang win a gold medal in the team event, despite being ill at the time. In the same year, she won her first two international titles – the Hong Kong U-13 and the Scottish Junior Open Under-12.

David won the Women's World Junior Squash Championships of 1999 beating her compatriot Lynn Leong in the final in Antwerp, Belgium, making her the youngest woman to become the world junior champion at the age of 15. In the process, she defeated three players ranked in the world top 20. She successfully defended the title in Penang in 2001, becoming one of only two players in the history of squash to have won it twice; her coach was Richard Glanfield.

In 1999, David began to win major junior tournaments, including the British Junior Open (Under-17 champion), the German Junior Open (Under-19, Champion), the SEA Games (Champion in the Senior and Team categories), and the Asian Junior Champion for both individual and team events.

David's biggest win, however, was the World Junior Championships, played in Antwerp. It took just half an hour for the then 15-year-old Malaysian schoolgirl to obtain world junior champion status, beating Lynn Leong 9–5, 9–3 and 9–2 in the final to become the youngest ever winner of the title. David reached the quarterfinals of the previous World Junior Championships in August 1997 in Brazil, as a thirteen-year-old and had since claimed both the Asian junior and senior titles, as well as the gold medal in the Asian Games in December 1998. David also is one of a few squash player to have won all the age categories in the British Junior Open.

=== 2000–2004: Early professional career ===
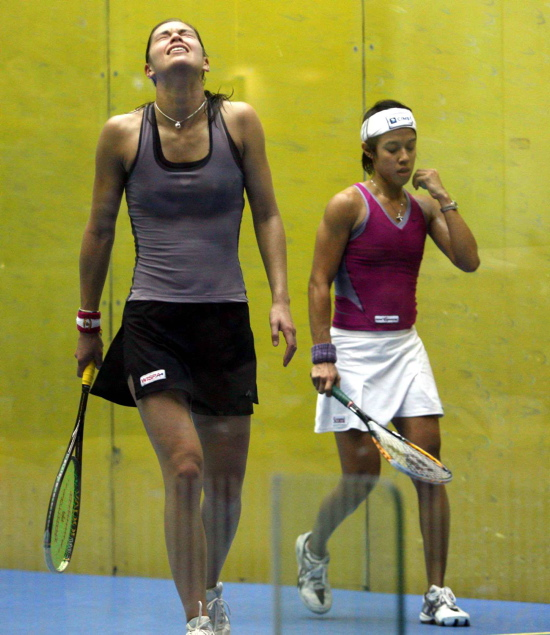
Nicol David and New Zealander Shelley Kitchen during the 2007 CIMB Malaysian Open.

David joined WISPA and turned professional in 2000 when she won her first WISPA title, after only a month in the tour. The victory came in February, when she defeated Salma Shabana in the final of the Savcor Finnish Open with a score of 9–1, 9–0 and 9–5. Within a month, Hotel Equatorial announced its two-year worldwide sponsorship for her. David also won a sponsorship on the WISPA tour by Dunlop squash.

In 2001, David, who has played under Dunlop Sport sponsorship for most of her junior career and WISPA career, signed a two-year deal to play with Head rackets with local conglomerate Mulpha Sports. In July, David won the World Junior title for a second time, beating Omneya Abdel Kawy in just 17 minutes with a score of 9–2, 9–4 and 9–2 in the final. She remained the only female squash player to have achieved this until 2007, when Raneem El Weleily won her second World Junior Championship. David also won the individual event in the Asian Junior Squash Championships by defeating her compatriot Tricia Chuah in the final with a score of 9–5, 9–6 and 9–0; and helped the Malaysian team to the team event title.

In 2002 David, together with her mixed double event partner Ong Beng Hee, won a Commonwealth Games silver medal for Malaysia after losing to Glen Wilson and Leilani Rorani in the final. Earlier in the year, David defeated Ellen Petersen of Denmark with a score of 9–2, 9–7, 8–10, 9–4 to win the second Kuala Lumpur Open title of her career. David failed to retain her Asian Games gold medal in 2002, when she was beaten 9–7, 9–5 and 9–7 by Rebecca Chiu of Hong Kong in the final in Busan, South Korea.

David was the losing finalist twice in 2003, losing to the more experienced Cassie Jackman on her home ground and then to Linda Elriani in the Monte Carlo Classic in November. She reached the semi-final of the World Open in Hong Kong, where she was again beaten by Jackman with a score of 9–6, 9–3, 9–4. David did not perform well in the other major WISPA events; she was eliminated in the first round of the Carol Weymuller US Open, in the British Open and in the Texas Open. In the Qatar Classic Open, David lost in the second round to Natalie Grinham with a score of 9–2, 7–9, 9–0 and 9–4.

In 2004 David again failed to win any title. Her achievements included getting into the final of both the Kuala Lumpur Open and the Malaysian Open. David started to progress in the very last month of the year by reaching the final of the Shanghai WISPA WorldStars Championship and the semi-finals of the World Open, to rise two places to number four in the January 2005 WISPA rankings.

=== 2005–2006: World champion and rise to the top ===
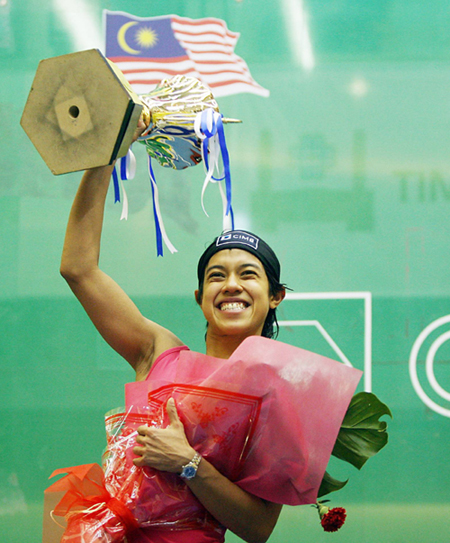
Nicol Ann David holding her CIMB Malaysian Squash Open 2007 trophy.

Defeated only twice in 2005, the 21-year-old from Penang returned to her home country in July after winning the gold medal at the World Games in Germany. she then became the first local player to win the Women's CIMB Malaysian Open Squash Championship title in the event's 31-year history. In October, David proved that her success in the World Games and in the Malaysian Open was not by chance by becoming the first Malaysian to win a British Open title, the first Asian to win the women's crown, when she beat Australia's Natalie Grinham in the women's final in straight games that lasted in 55 minutes. Within two months after the British Open and the World Games win, David won the World Open in Hong Kong for the first time and world number one ranking for the first time in January 2006. Later in the year, she was voted by her fellow members of the Women's International Squash Players Association as the WISPA Player of The Year 2005. David became the World's number 1 female squash player in January 2006 at the age of 23 to become the first Malaysian and the first Asian woman to be ranked World number 1 in the sport. She also became the twelfth holder of the position since the rankings were first produced in April 1983. David started the year on a low, losing twice to Vanessa Atkinson in February, in the Apawamis Open and in the Kuala Lumpur Open, both in the final. The two straight loses to Atkinson saw David's world rank dropped to number 2. David started to show progress later in the year and recovered from the setback to win six straight tour titles and reclaimed the World number 1 spot. David successfully defended her World Open title on 25 November 2006, at the Ulster Hall in Belfast by defeating Natalie Grinham in the final that was said to be "one of the great finals of the Women’s World Open". She became the first Malaysian athlete to win a world championship title for the second consecutive time, and the fourth person in history to retain the World Open Squash Championship. David also captured the Qatar Airways Challenge Open, the Dunlop British Open Championship, the Hong Kong Open, the Penang Open and the CIMB Malaysian Open. David topped the December WISPA ranking with a points average of almost twice that of her nearest rival, Rachael Grinham, and in the same month, in the second annual WISPA Awards, she was voted best female player of the year for the second time.

=== 2007–2008: Winning streak and dominance ===
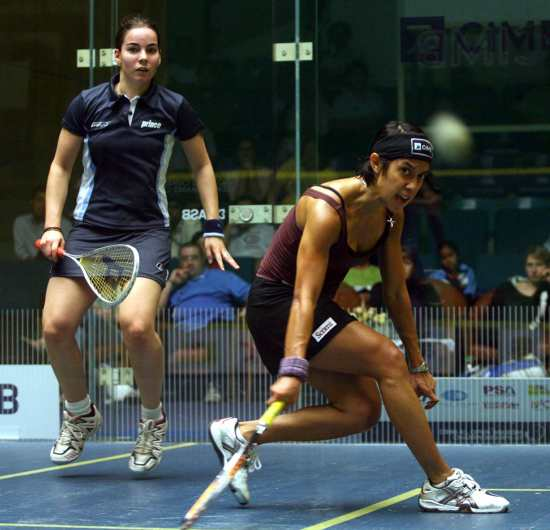
Nicol returning the ball to Jenny Duncalf at the 2007 CIMB Open at National Squash Complex, Bukit Jalil, Selangor.

David captured another six titles in the early months of 2007, then lost the final of the British Open to Australian Rachael Grinham in a five set final lasting 87 minutes. A month later, David again failed to defend her World Open title when she stumbled in the second round, losing to Shelley Kitchen with a score of 0–9, 1–9, 9–2, 9–3 and 6–9 in 69 minutes. It was the first time since April 2004 that David did not qualify for the quarters of a tournament, losing to the same person who denied her the bronze medal of the Commonwealth Games in Melbourne 9 months previously. In December, David won the inaugural Asian Sportswoman of the Year, beating more than 100 competitors who represented 25 sporting bodies.

In 2008, David won ten tour titles and was unbeaten. David completed her most successful year to date, retaining her Cathay Pacific Hong Kong Open title for the third successive year in November to bring her 2008 WISPA World Tour title total to ten, extending her unbeaten Tour record since October 2007 to 53 matches. David celebrated her second full calendar year as world number one in the December Women's World Squash Rankings thus bringing her reign at the top of women's squash to 30 straight months. David's WISPA title successes in 2008 began with the Apawamis Open in New York in February, and continued with the KL Open on home soil in Malaysia, the British Open title in England, Seoul Open in South Korea, Malaysian Open, the Singapore Masters, Dutch Open, World Open in England, Qatar Classic and the Hong Kong Open. Away from the tour, David secured her sixth successive biennial Asian Championship crown in February, after winning the first in July 1998 when aged just 14, and then lead Malaysia to the bronze medal in the Women's World Team Championship in Cairo.

=== 2009–2014: Sustained ranking and title dominance ===
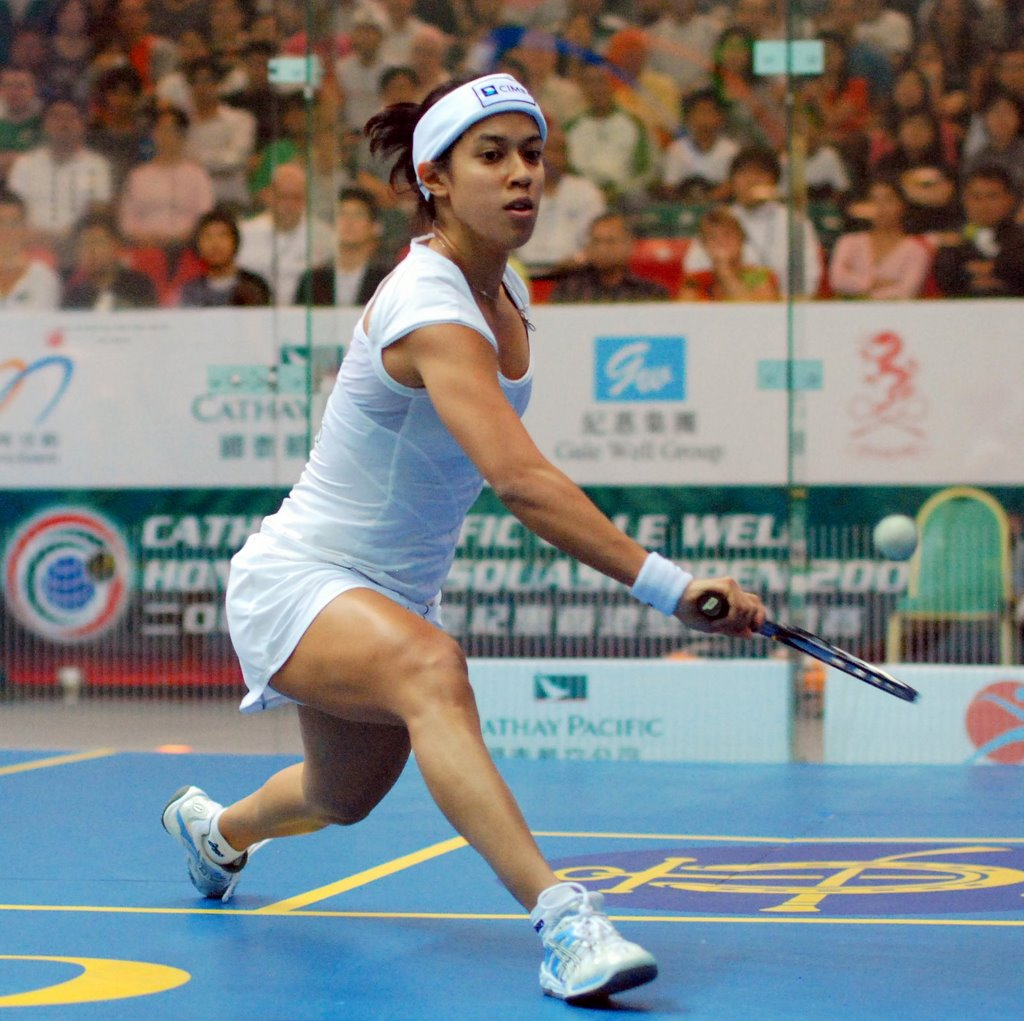
Nicol David in action on the sixth day of the 2009 Hong Kong Open.

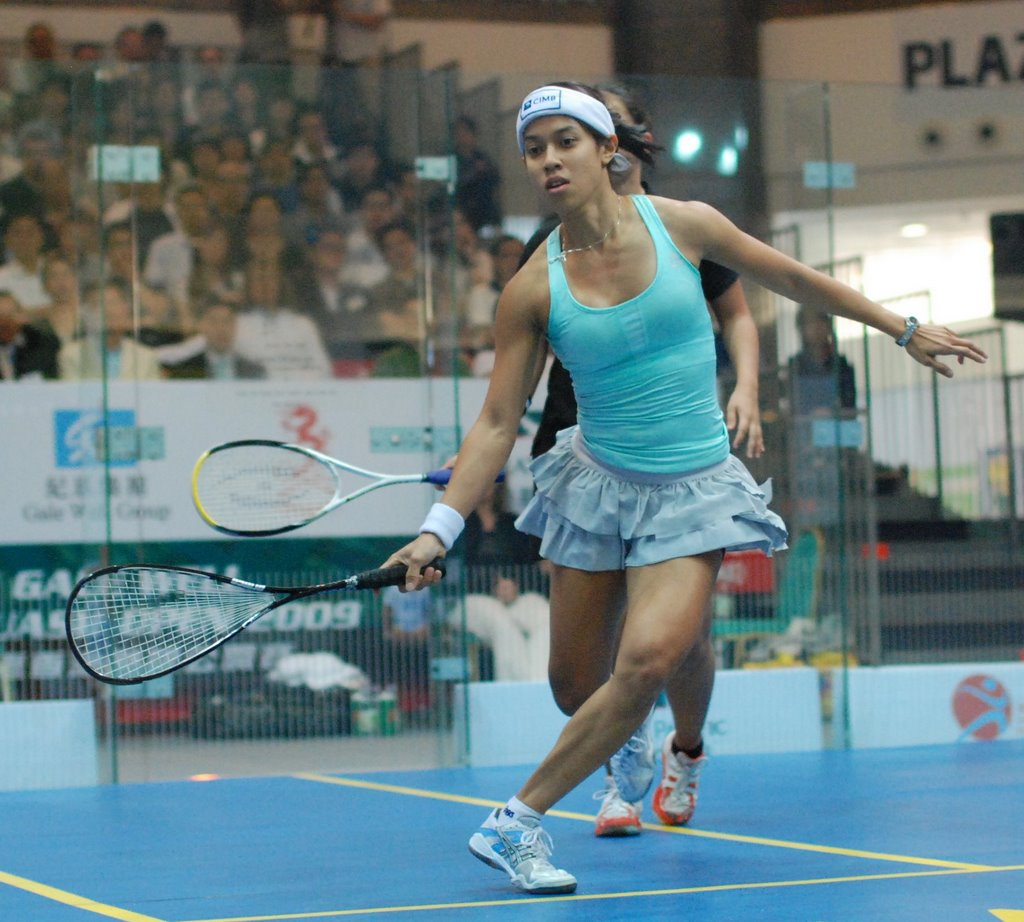
Nicol David on the seventh day of the 2009 Hong Kong Open.

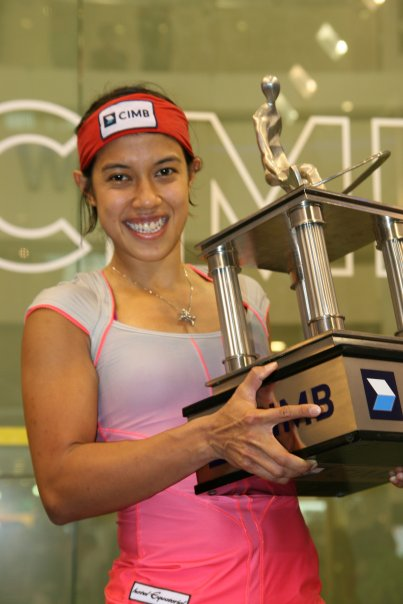
Nicol Ann David holding her CIMB Malaysian Squash Open 2009 trophy.

With a lead over her nearest rival, she led in the Women's World Squash Rankings published on 1 January 2009 by the Women's International Squash Players' Association (WISPA) – thus moving into her 30th successive month as the world's number one female player. David headed an unchanged top four, with Natalie Grinham (Netherlands) at No. 2; her older sister Rachael Grinham (Australia) at No. 3; and Natalie Grainger, of the United States, at No. 4. In her first tournament of the year, the Kuala Lumpur Open, David's 17-month, 56-match winning run was brought to an end when she lost to Natalie Grainger in the final. After the defeat, David recovered to capture the inaugural Cayman Islands Open. She managed to avenge her loss to Grainger early in the year by beating her 11–8, 11–6 and 11–5 in the final. It is her 35th tour crown and her 50th appearance in a WISPA Tour final. A week later, David went on to win her second title of the year by again dispatching Grainger, this time in four sets.

Twenty-one days after winning the Texas Open title, David captured her second Seoul City Open crown by defeating Jenny Duncalf in four sets. A month later, on 24 July, she retained her World Games women's singles title with a win over archrival Natalie Grinham of the Netherlands in straight sets. A week later, on 1 August, David picked up her fifth consecutive Malaysian Open title, winning 11–6, 11–8, 9–11, 11–7 in a 60-minute match against 25-year-old Londoner, Alison Waters. David thus became the first player to win five Malaysian Open titles in a row since its inception in 1975.

Dominating on the squash courts, David beat Natalie Grinham to win her third consecutive Singapore Masters championship, and her third title within a month. She overcame Natalie in three sets with a score of 11–9, 11–8 and 11–9 for her fifth WISPA title of the year. David celebrated another milestone in her squash career by moving into her 41st month as world number one in the September Women's World Rankings thus surpassing her mentor Sarah Fitz-Gerald as the player with the third longest ever reign at the top of the women's rankings. On 12 September, David lost to Madeline Perry in the British Open quarter-final in a five set match that lasted for 76 minutes; 15 days later, she recovered to defeat arch-rival Natalie Grinham in the final of the World Open Championship, obtaining the title for a record fourth time. David ended the year on a low when she lost in the semis to Jenny Duncalf in both the Qatar Classic and the US Open, the former ending in five sets.

David started 2010 ranked number 1 for the 42nd consecutive month. She appeared in the WISPA calendar for the month of January. David competed in her first tournament in March, the US$53,000 Chennai Open; she won all her matches in straight sets and was crowned as the champion, avenging two straight defeats to Jenny Duncalf in late 2009. Thirteen days later, in the Kuala Lumpur Open, David defeated the fourth seeded Egyptian Omneya Abdel Kawy who upset second seed Jenny Duncalf in the semi-finals in straight sets to win her second successive WISPA title of the year. It was David's sixth title in the Kuala Lumpur Open tournament as she had previously won it in 2000, 2002, 2005, 2007 and 2008.

David had won five more tour titles since April. This include winning the World Open title on 22 September. The World Open win was David's fifth, equalling Sarah Fitz-Gerald's record for the most times World Open win. In October, in the women's singles final of the 2010 Commonwealth Games in Delhi, David defeated Jenny Duncalf 11–3, 11–5, 11–7 in 40 minutes to win the gold medal. David did not drop a game in the entire tournament, just as she did in the 2010 World Open in Egypt.

David became the first player to win the US Open for the third straight year.

=== 2015–2019: Final years and retirement ===
In September 2015, David's uninterrupted nine-year reign as the world's top-ranked female squash player came to an end when Egypt's Raneem El Weleily replaced her at number one in the PSA Women's World Rankings. David had held the top position continuously since August 2006.

In July 2016, David reached her 151st consecutive month ranked among the world's top ten squash players, surpassing the previous record of 150 months held by former men's world number one Peter Nicol, breaking a new record across both the men's and women's professional rankings.

At the 2018 Asian Games in Indonesia, David won her fifth women's singles gold medal and seventh Asian Games gold medal overall. In the final on 26 August 2018, her 35th birthday, she defeated compatriot Sivasangari Subramaniam 11–13, 11–9, 5–11, 11–6, 11–8. It was her final appearance in the Asian Games as a professional player.

On 19 February 2019, David announced that she would retire at the end of the 2018–19 Professional Squash Association season. Her final professional match took place on 21 May 2019 at the British Open Squash Championships in Hull, England, where she lost to Egypt's Nour El Tayeb in the second round, 4–11, 7–11, 13–11, 5–11. She concluded her professional career with 81 PSA titles from 102 final appearances, eight World Championship titles and five British Open titles.

=== Rivalry between David and Natalie Grinham ===
David and Natalie Grinham have a long rivalry history. As of March 2012, they have met 36 times, with David leading their overall head-to-head series 29–7. Grinham is David's most frequent opponent on tour and 16 of their matches have been in tournament finals, including two in the World Open tournament. The World Open 2006 final between David and Grinham was said to be "one of the great finals of the Women’s World Open".

The longest match between the duo is in the 2007 CIMB Kuala Lumpur Open; which saw David went on to win in a five set match that lasted in 102 minutes. David won 6–9, 9–3, 9–6, 7–9, 9–6. On 27 September 2009 in the $118,000 2009 Women's World Open final, David won the match in four sets 3–11, 11–6, 11–3, 11–8 to become only the third player in the history of the championships to win four titles, alongside Australia's Sarah Fitz-Gerald and New Zealander Susan Devoy.

== Post-retirement ==
=== Nicol David Organisation ===
On 2 June 2022, she co-founded the Nicol David Organisation (NDO) with former Colombian squash player Mariana de Reyes. Established as a non-profit organisation in Kuala Lumpur, NDO was created to provide sporting and educational opportunities for children from low- and middle-income families.

The organisation's initial programme, ''Little Legends'', combined squash coaching with English-language tutoring and other educational activities for children aged eight to twelve. It began with 60 participants from four public schools in the Bukit Jalil and Sri Petaling areas. The programme was subsequently expanded to provide additional opportunities for children to participate in sport and after-school education.

In June 2024, David and de Reyes introduced ''Ibu Legends'', a programme aimed at supporting mothers through activities related to physical health, emotional well-being and personal development. The initiative expanded the organisation's community activities beyond children to include parents and families.

On 22 May 2025, NDO launched ''+Play'', a school-based initiative combining physical activity with mental well-being education. The programme was initially planned for implementation in 38 public schools across Kuala Lumpur, with the aim of reaching more than 1,000 pupils. Its activities focused on developing confidence, resilience and social skills through structured play and educational exercises.

By January 2026, the organisation's school-based mental well-being initiatives had reportedly reached more than 1,000 pupils. NDO had also developed programmes addressing family well-being and parental support. In 2026, it introduced ''Bapa Legends'', an initiative focused on fathers' physical, emotional and financial well-being. The organisation's school programmes reached 2,181 children across 42 public schools during 2025.

== Career statistics ==
=== WISPA titles (81) ===
All results for David in WISPA World Tour tournaments:

Legend
WISPA Platinum Series (12)
WISPA Gold Series (52)
WISPA Silver Series (12)
WISPA Tour Series (5)

o.	Date	Tournament	Opponent in Final	Score in Final	Length (H:MM)^{[b]}
1.	28 February 2000	Savcor Finnish Open	(Egypt) Salma Shabana	9–1, 9–0, 9–5	Unknown
2.	30 July 2000	Kuala Lumpur Open (1)	(Norway) Elin Blikra	9–2, 9–5, 9–5	0:32
3.	3 February 2002	Kuala Lumpur Open (2)	(Denmark) Ellen Petersen	9–2, 9–7, 8–10, 9–4	Unknown
4.	6 February 2005	Kuala Lumpur Open (3)	(Netherlands) Annelize Naudé	9–4, 9–2, 9–0	0:19
5.	12 March 2005	Sheikha Al Saad Kuwait Open (1)	(United States) Natalie Grainger	4–9, 9–6, 9–7, 10–8	0:45
6.	5 June 2005	Dutch Open (1)	(England) Linda Elriani	4–9, 2–9, 9–3, 9–3, 9–3	Unknown
7.	30 July 2005	Malaysian Women's Open (1)	(Netherlands) Vanessa Atkinson	3–9, 9–3, 1–9, 9–1, 9–4	0:52
8.	17 October 2005	British Open (1)	(Australia) Natalie Grinham	9–6, 9–7, 9–6	0:55
9.	30 October 2005	Carol Weymuller Open (1)	(Australia) Natalie Grinham	5–9, 9–6, 9–4, 9–3	1:00
10.	4 December 2005	World Open (1)	(Australia) Rachael Grinham	8–10, 9–2, 9–6, 9–7	0:53
11.	9 July 2006	Qatar Airways Challenge Open	(Australia) Rachael Grinham	4–9, 9–5, 9–0, 9–0	0:54
12.	30 July 2006	Malaysian Women's Open (2)	(England) Tania Bailey	9–4, 9–6, 2–9, 5–9, 9–3	1:25
13.	5 August 2006	Penang Open	(Australia) Rachael Grinham	9–6, 9–6, 5–9, 9–3	0:55
14.	18 September 2006	British Open (2)	(Australia) Rachael Grinham	9–4, 9–1, 9–4	0:41
15.	22 October 2006	Hong Kong Open (1)	(England) Tania Bailey	9–2, 10–8, 9–5	0:41
16.	26 November 2006	World Open (2)	(Australia) Natalie Grinham	1–9, 9–7, 3–9, 9–5, 9–2	1:38
17.	17 March 2007	Kuala Lumpur Open (4)	(Australia) Natalie Grinham	6–9, 9–3, 9–6, 7–9, 9–6	1:42
18.	11 April 2007	Sheikha Al Saad Kuwait Open (2)	(Australia) Natalie Grinham	9–6, 10–8, 2–9, 9–1	1:33
19.	17 April 2007	Qatar Classic (1)	(Australia) Natalie Grinham	9–7, 2–9, 9–7, 9–2	1:09
20.	28 July 2007	Malaysian Open (3)	(England) Tania Bailey	9–4, 9–3, 9–2	0:36
21.	4 August 2007	Singapore Masters (1)	(Australia) Natalie Grinham	9–6, 9–5, 9–5	0:54
22.	2 September 2007	Dutch Open (2)	(Australia) Rachael Grinham	9–4, 9–1, 9–6	0:34
23.	3 November 2007	Qatar Classic (2)	(United States) Natalie Grainger	9–6, 9–4, 10–9	0:43
24.	11 November 2007	Hong Kong Open (2)	(Australia) Natalie Grinham	9–3, 9–5, 10–8	0:58
25.^{[a]}	4 February 2008	Apawamis Squash Open	(Australia) Natalie Grinham	9–1, 9–6, 6–6 (ret)	0:45
26.	8 March 2008	Kuala Lumpur Open (5)	(Netherlands) Natalie Grinham	9–4, 9–2, 9–2	0:35
27.	12 May 2008	British Open (3)	(England) Jenny Duncalf	9–1, 10–8, 9–0	0:40
28.	7 June 2008	Seoul City Open (1)	(Australia) Rachael Grinham	9–5, 10–9, 9–6	0:41
29.^{[c]}	26 July 2008	Malaysian Open (4)	(Netherlands) Natalie Grinham	11–1, 11–4, 11–6	0:31
30.	2 August 2008	Singapore Masters (2)	(Australia) Rachael Grinham	8–11, 11–3, 11–5, 11–8	0:39
31.	7 September 2008	Dutch Open (3)	(Netherlands) Natalie Grinham	11–9, 11–9, 11–4	0:55
32.	19 October 2008	World Open (3)	(England) Vicky Botwright	5–11, 11–1, 11–6, 11–9	0:44
33.	31 October 2008	Qatar Classic (3)	(Netherlands) Natalie Grinham	11–7, 11–3, 11–9	0:29
34.	23 November 2008	Hong Kong Open (3)	(Australia) Rachael Grinham	14–12, 11–13, 11–8, 11–8	0:53
35.	10 May 2009	Cayman Islands Open (1)	(United States) Natalie Grainger	11–8, 11–6, 11–5	0:33
36.	17 May 2009	Texas Open	(United States) Natalie Grainger	7–11, 12–10, 11–5, 11–6	0:39
37.	7 June 2009	Seoul City Open (2)	(England) Jenny Duncalf	11–6, 3–11, 11–6, 11–4	0:38
38.	1 August 2009	Malaysian Open (5)	(England) Alison Waters	11–6, 11–8, 9–11, 11–7	1:00
39.	8 August 2009	Singapore Masters (3)	(Netherlands) Natalie Grinham	11–9, 11–8, 11–9	0:40
40.	27 September 2009	World Open (4)	(Netherlands) Natalie Grinham	3–11, 11–6, 11–3, 11–8	0:51
41.	18 October 2009	Hong Kong Open (4)	(Egypt) Omneya Abdel Kawy	11–4, 11–7, 11–7	0:25
42.	7 March 2010	Chennai Open	(England) Jenny Duncalf	11–6, 11–4, 11–6	0:25
43.	20 March 2010	Kuala Lumpur Open (6)	(Egypt) Omneya Abdel Kawy	11–4, 11–2, 13–11	0:31
44.	17 April 2010	Cayman Islands Open (2)	(England) Jenny Duncalf	11–8, 11–8, 11–4	0:32
45.	24 July 2010	Malaysian Open (6)	(England) Jenny Duncalf	11–6, 6–11, 11–7, 10–12, 11–5	1:12
46.	31 July 2010	Singapore Masters (4)	(England) Alison Waters	18–16, 11–9, 12–10	1:03
47.	27 August 2010	Hong Kong Open (5)	(England) Jenny Duncalf	11–6, 12–10, 12–10	0:40
48.	22 September 2010	World Open (5)	(Egypt) Omneya Abdel Kawy	11–5, 11–8, 11–6	0:30
49.	24 October 2010	Torneo International Bicentenario Mexico	(Australia) Rachael Grinham	12–10, 11–4, 11–5	0:35
50.	12 November 2010	Qatar Classic (4)	(Australia) Rachael Grinham	11–5, 11–8, 11–9	0:34
51.	20 March 2011	Kuala Lumpur Open (7)	(Republic of Ireland) Madeline Perry	11–6, 11–6, 11–2	0:34
52.	9 April 2011	Cayman Islands Open (3)	(England) Jenny Duncalf	11–7, 11–6, 12–14, 11–4	0:59
53.	23 July 2011	Malaysian Open (7)	(England) Jenny Duncalf	11–6, 12–10, 11–5	0:42
54.	14 August 2011	Australian Open (1)	(England) Jenny Duncalf	11–8, 11–4, 11–6	0:36
55.	21 October 2011	Qatar Classic (5)	(Republic of Ireland) Madeline Perry	11–2, 11–7, 11–3	0:33
56.	6 November 2011	World Open (6)	(England) Jenny Duncalf	11–2, 11–5, 11–0	0:28
57.	20 November 2011	Hong Kong Open (6)	(Egypt) Raneem El Weleily	11–5, 11–4, 11–9	0:30
58.	8 January 2012	World Series Finals (1)	(Republic of Ireland) Madeline Perry	11–9, 11–9, 11–9	0:40
59.	1 February 2012	Cleveland Classic (1)	(England) Laura Massaro	7–11, 12–10, 11–7, 11–8	0:57
60.	31 March 2012	Kuala Lumpur Open (8)	(Hong Kong) Annie Au	11–4, 12–10, 11–9	0:36
61.	20 May 2012	British Open (4)	(Egypt) Nour El Sherbini	11–6, 11–6, 11–6	0:33
62.	19 August 2012	Australian Open (2)	(England) Laura Massaro	17–15, 11–2, 11–6	0:44
63.	12 October 2012	US Open (1)	(Egypt) Raneem El Weleily	14–12, 8–11, 11–7, 11–7	0:45
64.	2 December 2012	Hong Kong Open (7)	(France) Camille Serme	11–9, 11–6, 8–11, 11–7	0:58
65.	22 December 2012	World Open (7)	(England) Laura Massaro	11–6, 11–8, 11–6	0:44
66.	6 January 2013	World Series Finals (2)	(England) Laura Massaro	11–3, 11–2, 11–9	0:37
67.	15 September 2013	Malaysian Open (8)	(Egypt) Raneem El Weleily	11–8, 11–7, 11–6	0:34
68.	6 October 2013	Carol Weymuller Open (2)	(France) Camille Serme	12–10, 11–2, 11–5	Unknown
69.	18 October 2013	US Open (2)	(England) Laura Massaro	13–11, 11–13, 7–11, 11–8, 11–5	1:24
70.	27 October 2013	China Open	(Egypt) Raneem El Weleily	8–11, 6–11, 11–7, 11–7, 11–8	0:45
71.	8 December 2013	Hong Kong Open (8)	(Egypt) Raneem El Weleily	11–7, 11–7, 12–10	0:35
72.	24 January 2014	Tournament of Champions	(England) Laura Massaro	11–4, 13–11, 11–8	0:45
73.	4 February 2014	Cleveland Classic (2)	(Hong Kong) Annie Au	13–11, 11–5, 11–6	0:35
74.	18 May 2014	British Open (5)	(England) Laura Massaro	8–11, 11–5, 11–7, 11–8	1:04
75.	31 August 2014	Hong Kong Open (9)	(Egypt) Nour El Tayeb	11–4, 12–10, 11–8	0:39
76.	18 October 2014	US Open (3)	(Egypt) Nour El Sherbini	11–5, 12–10, 12–10	0:41
77.	26 October 2014	Macau Open	(Egypt) Raneem El Weleily	11–8, 11–2, 11–8	
78.	20 December 2014	World Open (8)	(Egypt) Raneem El Weleily	5–11, 11–8, 7–11, 14–12, 11–5	1:06
79.	6 February 2015	Cleveland Classic (3)	(Egypt) Raneem El Weleily	11–5, 11–9, 11–4	
80.	6 December 2015	Hong Kong Open (10)	(England) Laura Massaro	15–13, 11–5, 11–3	0:39
81.	11 March 2017	Ciudad de Floridablanca	(United States) Olivia Blatchford	11–3, 11–4, 11–8	0:30

=== WISPA finals (runner-up) (21) ===
No.	Date	Tournament	Opponent in Final	Score in Final	Length (H:MM)^{[b]}
1.	19 April 1998	Milo Open (1)	(England) Janie Thacker	5–9, 4–9 (ret)	Unknown
2.	4 July 1999	Kuala Lumpur Open (1)	(New Zealand) Carol Owens	0–9, 2–9, 5–9	Unknown
3.	16 April 2000	Milo Open (2)	(Australia) Rachael Grinham	2–9, 4–9, 6–9	Unknown
4.	24 June 2000	YTL Open	(New Zealand) Carol Owens	1–9, 5–9, 2–9	0:35
5.	16 March 2001	DMC Open	(Australia) Rachael Grinham	4–9, 2–9, 4–9	Unknown
6.	23 August 2003	Malaysia Women's Open (1)	(England) Cassie Jackman	5–9, 9–1, 4–9, 7–9	0:47
7.	22 November 2003	Monte Carlo Classic Open	(England) Linda Elriani	10–8, 1–9, 6–9, 1–9	0:42
8.	15 February 2004	Kuala Lumpur Open (2)	(Netherlands) Vanessa Atkinson	0–9, 7–9, 9–1, 2–9	0:28
9.	24 July 2004	Malaysia Women's Open (2)	(Netherlands) Vanessa Atkinson	2–9, 4–9, 0–9	0:25
10.	21 November 2004	Shanghai WISPA Worldstars Open	(England) Cassie Jackman	2–9, 3–9, 0–9	0:27
11.	6 February 2006	Apawamis Open	(Netherlands) Vanessa Atkinson	6–9, 2–9, 10–9, 7–9	1:05
12.	18 February 2006	Kuala Lumpur Open (3)	(Netherlands) Vanessa Atkinson	7–9, 9–4, 1–9, 3–9	0:42
13.	28 April 2007	Seoul City Open	(Australia) Natalie Grinham	4–9, 4–9, 0–9	0:43
14.	24 September 2007	British Open (1)	(Australia) Rachael Grinham	9–7, 9–4, 3–9, 8–10, 1–9	1:27
15.	7 March 2009	Kuala Lumpur Open (4)	(United States) Natalie Grainger	8–11, 12–10, 7–11, 11–5, 6–11	0:51
16.	2 February 2011	Cleveland Classic (1)	(England) Laura Massaro	9–11, 7–11, 11–9, 8–11	1:01
17.	15 September 2012	Malaysian Open (3)	(Egypt) Raneem El Weleily	10–12, 13–11, 6–11, 2–11	0:36
18.	5 February 2013	Cleveland Classic (2)	(Egypt) Raneem El Weleily	11–3, 5–11, 11–9, 5–11, 9–11	1:00
19.	26 May 2013	British Open (2)	(England) Laura Massaro	4–11, 11–3, 10–12, 7–11	0:44
20.	4 March 2015	Windy City Open	(Egypt) Raneem El Weleily	16–14, 10–12, 7–11, 7–11	0:57
21.	30 September 2017	Oracle Netsuite Open	(England) Sarah Jane Perry	11–8, 11–8, 7–11, 12–14, 7–11	Unknown

=== World Open ===
==== Finals: 8 (8 titles, 0 runner-up) ====
Outcome	Year	Opponent in Final	Score in Final
Winner	2005	(Australia) Rachael Grinham	8–10, 9–2, 9–6, 9–7
Winner	2006	(Australia) Natalie Grinham	1–9, 9–7, 3–9, 9–5, 9–2
Winner	2008	(England) Vicky Botwright	5–11, 11–1, 11–6, 11–9
Winner	2009	(Netherlands) Natalie Grinham^{[a]}	3–11, 11–6, 11–3, 11–8
Winner	2010	(Egypt) Omneya Abdel Kawy	11–5, 11–8, 11–6
Winner	2011	(England) Jenny Duncalf	11–2, 11–5, 11–0
Winner	2012	(England) Laura Massaro	11–6, 11–8, 11–6
Winner	2014	(Egypt) Raneem El Weleily	5–11, 11–8, 7–11, 14–12, 11–5

=== Major World Series final appearances ===
==== British Open: 7 finals (5 titles, 2 runner-up) ====
Outcome	Year	Opponent in Final	Score in Final
Winner	2005	(Australia) Natalie Grinham	9–6, 9–7, 9–6
Winner	2006	(Australia) Rachael Grinham	9–4, 9–1, 9–4
Runner-up	2007	(Australia) Rachael Grinham	9–7, 9–4, 3–9, 8–10, 1–9
Winner	2008	(England) Jenny Duncalf	9–1, 10–8, 9–0
Winner	2012	(Egypt) Nour El Sherbini	11–6, 11–6, 11–6
Runner-up	2013	(England) Laura Massaro	4–11, 11–3, 10–12, 8–11
Winner	2014	(England) Laura Massaro	8–11, 11–5, 11–7, 11–8

==== Hong Kong Open: 10 finals (10 titles, 0 runner-up) ====
Outcome	Year	Opponent in Final	Score in Final
Winner	2006	(England) Tania Bailey	9–1, 10–8, 9–5
Winner	2007	(Australia) Natalie Grinham	9–3, 9–5, 10–8
Winner	2008	(Australia) Rachael Grinham	14–12, 11–13, 11–8, 11–8
Winner	2009	(Egypt) Omneya Abdel Kawy	11–4, 11–7, 11–7
Winner	2010	(England) Jenny Duncalf	11–6, 12–10, 12–10
Winner	2011	(Egypt) Raneem El Weleily	11–5, 11–4, 11–9
Winner	2012	(France) Camille Serme	11–9, 11–6, 8–11, 11–7
Winner	2013	(Egypt) Raneem El Weleily	11–7, 11–7, 12–10
Winner	2014	(Egypt) Nour El Tayeb	11–4, 12–10, 11–8
Winner	2015	(England) Laura Massaro	15–13, 11–5, 11–3

==== Qatar Classic: 5 finals (5 titles, 0 runner-up) ====
Outcome	Year	Opponent in Final	Score in Final
Winner	2006	(Australia) Natalie Grinham	9–7, 2–9, 9–7, 9–2
Winner	2007	(United States) Natalie Grainger	9–6, 9–4, 10–9
Winner	2008	(Netherlands) Natalie Grinham	11–7, 11–3, 11–9
Winner	2010	(Australia) Rachael Grinham	11–5, 11–8, 11–9
Winner	2011	(Republic of Ireland) Madeline Perry	11–2, 11–7, 11–3

==== Malaysian Open: 11 finals (8 titles, 3 runner-up) ====
Outcome	Year	Opponent in Final	Score in Final
Runner-up	2003	(England) Cassie Jackman	5–9, 9–1, 4–9, 7–9
Runner-up	2004	(Netherlands) Vanessa Atkinson	2–9, 4–9, 0–9
Winner	2005	(Netherlands) Vanessa Atkinson	3–9, 9–3, 1–9, 9–1, 9–4
Winner	2006	(England) Tania Bailey	9–4, 9–6, 2–9, 5–9, 9–3
Winner	2007	(England) Tania Bailey	9–4, 9–3, 9–2
Winner	2008	(Netherlands) Natalie Grinham	11–1, 11–4, 11–6
Winner	2009	(England) Alison Waters	11–6, 11–8, 9–11, 11–7
Winner	2010	(England) Jenny Duncalf	11–6, 6–11, 11–7, 10–12, 11–5
Winner	2011	(England) Jenny Duncalf	11–6, 12–10, 11–5
Runner-up	2012	(Egypt) Raneem El Weleily	10–12, 13–11, 6–11, 2–11
Winner	2013	(Egypt) Raneem El Weleily	11–8, 11–7, 11–6

=== Other titles ===
1998 Asian Championship – Singles Champion (1), Asian Games – Singles Gold (1)

2000 Asian Championship – Singles Champion (2)

2002 Asian Championship – Singles Champion (3), Asian Championship – Team Champion (1), Asian Games – Singles Silver, Commonwealth Games – Mixed Doubles Silver

2004 Asian Championship – Singles Champion (4), Asian Championship – Team Champion (2)

2005 World Games – Singles Champion (1)

2006 Asian Championship – Singles Champion (5), Asian Championship – Team Champion (3), Asian Games – Singles Gold (2)

2008 Asian Championship – Singles Champion (6), Asian Championship – Team Champion (4)

2009 World Games – Singles Champion (2)

2010 Asian Championship – Singles Champion (7), Asian Games – Singles Gold (3), Asian Games – Team Gold (1), Commonwealth Games – Singles Gold (1), Commonwealth Games – Mixed Doubles Bronze

2011 Asian Championship – Singles Champion (8)

2013 World Games – Singles Champion (3)

2014 Asian Championship – Team Champion (5), Asian Games – Singles Gold (4), Asian Games – Team Gold (2), Commonwealth Games – Singles Gold (2)

2015 Asian Championship – Singles Champion (9)

2018 Asian Games – Singles Gold (5)

=== Junior titles ===
1995 Scottish Junior Open – Under-14 Champion

1996 British Junior Open – Under-14 Champion, Scottish Junior Open – Under-14 Champion

1997 British Junior Open – Under-14 Champion, Scottish Junior Open – Under-16 Champion, Australian Junior Open – Under-15 Champion, Australian Junior Open – Under-17 Champion

1998 British Junior Open – Under-16 Champion, Scottish Junior Open – Under-17 Champion, Asian Junior Squash Grand Circuit Final – Under-19 Champion

1999 World Junior Champion (1), British Junior Open – Under-17 Champion, British Junior Open – Under-19 Champion, Asian Junior Championship – Singles Champion (1), Asian Junior Championship – Team Champion (1), German Junior Open – Champion, Malaysian Junior Open – Champion

2001 World Junior Champion (2), Asian Junior Championship – Singles Champion (2), Asian Junior Championship – Team Champion (2)

=== Singles performance timeline ===
Terms
W–L	Win–loss	NWS	Not a World Series event
NG50	Not a Gold 50 event	NH	Not held
A	Absent	LQ/#Q	Lost in qualifying draw and round number
RR	Lost at round robin stage	#R	Lost in the early rounds
QF	Quarterfinalist	SF	Semifinalist
SF-B	Semifinalist, won bronze medal	F	Runner-up
F	Runner-up, won silver medal	W	Winner

To prevent confusion and double counting, information in this table is updated only once a tournament or the player's participation in the tournament has concluded.

Tournament	1998	1999	2000	2001	2002	2003	2004	2005	2006	2007	2008	2009	2010	2011	2012	2013	2014	2015	Career SR	Career W-L
WSA World Tour Tournaments
World Open	Absent			2R	A	SF	SF	W	W	2R	W	W	W	W	W	SF	W		8 / 13	51–5
British Open	Absent			1R	2R	1R	QF	W	W	F	W	QF	Not Held		W	F	W	SF	6 / 13	36–8
World Series Finals	Not Held													W	W	Not Held			2 / 2	9–1
Cayman Islands Open	Not Held											W	W	W	Not Held				3 / 3	12–0
Hong Kong Open	Absent			1R	Not Held				W	W	W	W	W	W	W	W	W	W	10 / 11	50–1
Kuala Lumpur Open	NH	F	W	QF	W	A	F	W	F	W	W	F	W	W	W	SF	Not Held		8 / 14	48–6
Malaysian Open	Not Held		A	NH	A	F	F	W	W	W	W	W	W	W	F	W	SF	NH	8 / 12	47–4
Qatar Classic	Not Held			A	NH	2R	QF	SF	NH	W	W	SF	W	W	Not Held			SF	5 / 10	37–5
Qatar Classic	Not Held			A	NH	2R	QF	SF	NH	W	W	SF	W	W	Not Held			SF	5 / 10	37–5
United States Open	Absent		Not Held										A	QF	W	W	W	QF	3 / 5	18–2
Australian Open	Absent													W	W	Not Held		NWS	2 / 2	10–0
Carol Weymuller Open	Absent			NH	A	LQ	QF	W	Absent			SF	Absent		QF	W	Absent		2 / 5	12–3
Cleveland Classic	Not Held									Absent				F	W	F	W	W	3 / 5	18–2
Singapore Masters	Not Held									W	W	W	W	SF	Not Held				4 / 5	18–1
World Games
Singles	Not Held							W	Not Held			W	Not Held			W	Not Held		3 / 3	NA
Commonwealth Games
Singles	2R	Not Held			2R	Not Held			SF	Not Held			W	Not Held			W	NH	2 / 5	NA
Asian Games
Singles	W	Not Held			F	Not Held			W	Not Held			W	Not Held			W	NH	4 / 5	NA
Asian Championship
Singles	W	NH	W	NH	W	NH	W	NH	W	NH	W	NH	W	W	NH	A	NH	W	9 / 9	NA

Note: NA = Not Available

== Awards and recognition ==
On 7 June 2008, David was honoured with the Order of Merit (Darjah Bakti) or D.B. in conjunction with the birthday of His Majesty Tuanku Mizan Zainal Abidin. She was the first recipient of the award which was established on 26 June 1975. The award is limited to 10 recipients who have made significant contributions in the arts, sciences and the humanities.

On 12 July 2008, David was among 497 people honoured in conjunction with the 70th birthday of the Penang State Governor Tun Abdul Rahman Abbas. David was also one of the 28 people who received the Darjah Setia Pangkuan Negeri award (DSPN), which carries the title Datuk, making her the youngest person ever to be conferred Datukship in Penang. The former Prime Minister of Malaysia Tun Abdullah Ahmad Badawi, a fellow Penangite, once quipped that David is "now more famous than me". In July 2007, David received Master of Arts honoris causa; an honorary degree by the University of Nottingham. David has also obtained the WISPA Player of the Year on six consecutive occasions, from 2005 until 2010.

David was given the honour of carrying the Olympic torch for Malaysia during the build up to the Athens Olympics of 2004, and was appointed UNDP National Goodwill Ambassador for Malaysia.

On 23 September 2019, David was conferred with an Honorary Doctorate (Ph.D.) in Sports Science by Universiti Sains Malaysia (USM).

== Honours ==
=== Honours of Malaysia ===
- Malaysia
  - Member of the Order of the Defender of the Realm (AMN) (2000)
  - Officer of the Order of the Defender of the Realm (KMN) (2006)
  - Grand Recipient of the Order of Merit (DB) (2008)
  - Commander of the Order of Meritorious Service (PJN) – Datuk (2017)
- Penang
  - Officer of the Order of the Defender of State (DSPN) – Dato' (2008)

== In popular culture ==
The ACE Pictures has on 7 June 2021 announced a biopic in English based on David's life story titled 'I am Nicol David' will soon be produced.

== See also ==
- Official Women's Squash World Ranking
- List of WISPA number 1 ranked players
- WISPA Awards
- British Open Squash Championships
- British Junior Open Squash

== Notes ==
- ^{a} Natalie Grinham switched allegiance to the Netherlands from March 2008 onwards.
- ^{b} H represents hour while MM represents minutes.
- ^{c} WISPA tournament uses PAR scoring from 21 July 2008 onwards.

Sporting positions
Preceded by Vanessa Atkinson; Vanessa Atkinson	World No. 1 January 2006 – March 2006; August 2006 – August 2015	Succeeded by Vanessa Atkinson; Raneem El Weleily
Awards and achievements
Preceded by –	Asian Sportswoman of the Year; 2007	Incumbent
Preceded by Vanessa Atkinson; Laura Massaro	WISPA Player of the Year; 2005–10; 2012	Succeeded by Laura Massaro; Laura Massaro
