= Squash at the 2005 World Games – women's singles =

2005 World Games - Squash Single Women
Host	(Germany) Duisburg
Dates	July 16–19, 2005
Teams	16
Podium
Champion	(Malaysia) Nicol David
Runners-up	(Australia) Rachael Grinham
Third place	(Egypt) Omneya Abdel Kawy (United Kingdom) Linda Elriani

The Squash - Single Women competition at the World Games 2005 took place from July 16 to July 19 in Duisburg in Germany.

== Seeds ==
1. (Australia) Rachael Grinham (Final)
2. (Malaysia) Nicol David (Champion)
3. (United Kingdom) Linda Elriani (Semifinals)
4. (Egypt) Omneya Abdel Kawy (Semifinals)
5. (France) Isabelle Stoehr (Quarterfinals)
6. (United Kingdom) Jenny Tranfield (Quarterfinals)
7. (United States) Latasha Khan (Quarterfinals)
8. (Canada) Runa Reta (Quarterfinals)

== Draw ==
Round of 16
1	(Australia) Rachael Grinham	3
(Italy) Sonia Pasteris	0
(Austria) Pamela Pancis	0
6	(United Kingdom) Jenny Tranfield	3
8	(Canada) Runa Reta	3
(Germany) Karen Berière	2
(Germany) Daniela Schumann	0
4	(Egypt) Omneya Abdel Kawy	3
3	(United Kingdom) Linda Elriani	3
(Mexico) Samantha Terán	0
(Germany) Katharina Witt	0
5	(France) Isabelle Stoehr	3
7	(United States) Latasha Khan	3
(Denmark) Ellen Petersen	0
(South Africa) Tenille Swartz	0
2	(Malaysia) Nicol David	3

Quarter finals
1	(Australia) Rachael Grinham	3
6	(United Kingdom) Jenny Tranfield	0
8	(Canada) Runa Reta	0
4	(Egypt) Omneya Abdel Kawy	3
3	(United Kingdom) Linda Elriani	3
5	(France) Isabelle Stoehr	0
7	(United States) Latasha Khan	0
2	(Malaysia) Nicol David	3

Semi finals
1	(Australia) Rachael Grinham	3
4	(Egypt) Omneya Abdel Kawy	1
3	(United Kingdom) Linda Elriani	0
2	(Malaysia) Nicol David	3

Finals
1	(Australia) Rachael Grinham	0
2	(Malaysia) Nicol David	3

Note: * w/d = Withdraw, * w/o = Walkover, * r = Retired
