= Squash at the 2006 Commonwealth Games =

- Venue: Melbourne Sports and Aquatic Centre
- Location: Melbourne, Australia
- Dates: 15 to 26 March 2006

Squash at the 2006 Commonwealth Games was the third appearance of Squash at the Commonwealth Games. Competition was held in Melbourne, Australia, from 15 to 26 March 2006 and featured contests in five events.

The squash events were played for the most part at the Melbourne Sports and Aquatic Centre. Singles play took place from 16 to 20 March and the doubles play was contested from 21 to 26 March.

Australia topped the squash medal table by virtue of winning three gold medals.

A high number of multiple entries by countries in the doubles events occurred because players could enter both the men's or women's events as well as the mixed doubles, and countries could put in as many entries as they chose to, as long as their players were in one of the singles events. The most medals one player could win at the Games was three: one in singles, one in men's or women's doubles, and one in mixed. Australians David Palmer, Rachael Grinham and Natalie Grinham all achieved this feat, with Natalie Grinham winning three gold medals. She was the first competitor ever to win three gold medals in squash at a single Commonwealth Games.

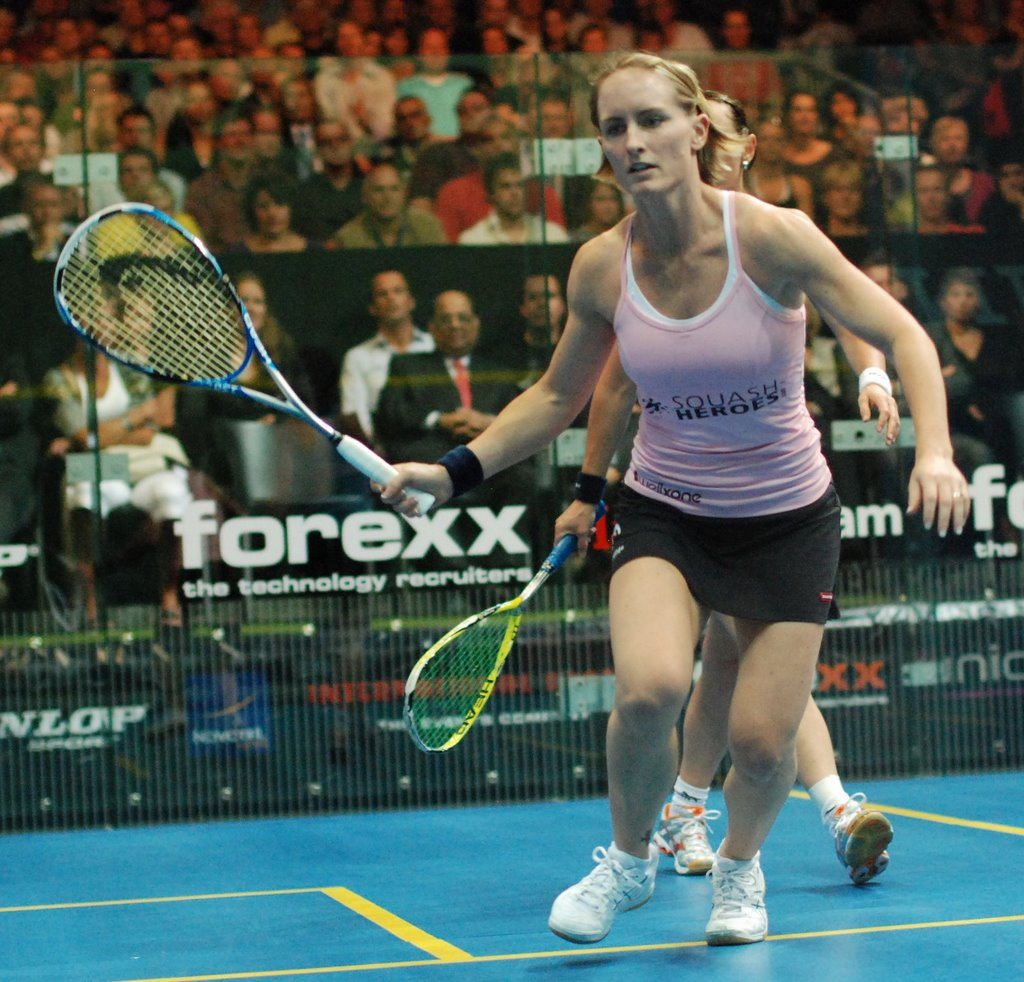
Natalie Grinham of Australia

== Medal table ==
* Host nation (Australia)

Rank	Nation	Gold	Silver	Bronze	Total
1	Australia*	3	3	2	8
2	England	2	1	2	5
3	New Zealand	0	1	1	2
Totals (3 entries)		5	5	5	15

== Medallists ==
Event	Gold	Silver	Bronze
Men's singles	Peter Nicol; England	David Palmer; Australia	Lee Beachill; England
Women's singles	Natalie Grinham; Australia	Rachael Grinham; Australia	Shelley Kitchen; New Zealand
Men's doubles	Peter Nicol & Lee Beachill; England	Stewart Boswell and Anthony Ricketts; Australia	Dan Jenson and David Palmer; Australia
Women's doubles	Natalie Grinham and Rachael Grinham; Australia	Shelley Kitchen and Tamsyn Leevey; New Zealand	Tania Bailey and Vicky Botwright; England
Mixed doubles	Natalie Grinham and Joe Kneipp; Australia	Vicky Botwright and James Willstrop; England	Rachael Grinham and David Palmer; Australia

== Results ==
=== Men's singles (16-20 March) ===
Round of 16
4	(England) Peter Nicol	9	9	9
(Canada) Matthew Giuffre	2	2	0
12	(Canada) Graham Ryding	9	9	9	9
8	(Malaysia) Mohd Azlan Iskandar	10	1	0	5
7	(England) Nick Matthew	9	9	9
9	(Malaysia) Ong Beng Hee	4	2	7
2	(England) James Willstrop	9	9	9
(Wales) Gavin Jones	0	7	1
1	(Australia) David Palmer	9	9	10
14	(Canada) Shahier Razik	2	4	6
6	(Scotland) John White	9	9	9
16	(Australia) Joseph Kneipp	6	0	2
5	(England) Lee Beachill	9	9	9
13	(Wales) Alex Gough	1	0	1
10	(Australia) Stewart Boswell	10	9	9
3	(Australia) Anthony Ricketts	8	2	7

Quarter finals
4	(England) Nicol	9	9	9
8	(Canada) Ryding	5	1	3
7	(England) Matthew	9	3	8	10	9
2	(England) Willstrop	3	9	10	8	5
1	(Australia) Palmer	2	10	9	9
6	(Scotland) White	9	8	6	0
5	(England) Beachill	9	9	9
10	(Australia) Boswell	4	3	3

Semi finals
4	(England) Nicol	3	9	9	9
7	(England) Matthew	9	5	4	5
1	(Australia) Palmer	9	9	9
5	(England) Beachill	0	4	4

Final
4	(England) Nicol	9	10	4	9
1	(Australia) Palmer	5	8	9	2
Third place
7	(England) Matthew	3	7	3
5	(England) Beachill	9	9	9

=== Women's singles (16-20 March) ===
Round of 16
3	(Australia) Natalie Grinham	7	9	9	9
16	(Malaysia) Tricia Chuah	9	5	3	0
7	(Northern Ireland) Madeline Perry	6	9	9	6	9
10	(Malaysia) Sharon Wee	9	3	5	0	5
1	(Malaysia) Nicol David	9	9	9
13	(Canada) Runa Reta	0	0	3
8	(England) Tania Bailey	9	9	9
12	(Australia) Amelia Pittock	2	2	1
2	(Australia) Rachael Grinham	9	9	9
15	(Australia) Kasey Brown	3	1	2
6	(England) Linda Elriani	9	10	9
11	(Wales) Tegwen Malik	6	8	3
9	(New Zealand) Shelley Kitchen	9	4	9	9
5	(England) Jenny Duncalf	6	9	6	1
4	(England) Vicky Botwright	9	9	9
(South Africa) Tenille Swartz	4	7	7

Quarter finals
3	(Australia) Grinham N	9	9	4	9
7	(Northern Ireland) Perry	1	7	9	3
1	(Malaysia) David	9	10	9
8	(England) Bailey	6	9	3
2	(Australia) Grinham R	1	9	9	9
6	(England) Elriani	9	5	5	3
9	(New Zealand) Kitchen	10	9	9
4	(England) Botwright	8	5	1

Semi finals
3	(Australia) Grinham N	9	9	4	9	9
1	(Malaysia) David	10	7	9	6	3
2	(Australia) Grinham R	10	9	9
9	(New Zealand) Kitchen	8	4	2

Final
3	(Australia) Grinham N	2	9	9	9
2	(Australia) Grinham R	9	6	1	6
Third place
1	(Malaysia) David	9	6	5	2
9	(New Zealand) Kitchen	5	9	9	9

=== Men's doubles (21-26 March) ===
Quarter finals
2	(England) Lee Beachill & Peter Nicol	5	9	9	9
8	(Scotland) Harry Leitch & John White	9	4	6	4
3	(Australia) David Palmer & Dan Jenson	9	9	7	9
6	(Wales) David Evans & Alex Gough	6	2	9	7
1	(Australia) Stewart Boswell & Anthony Ricketts	9	6	7	9	9
7	(South Africa) Rodney Durbach & Adrian Hansen	7	9	9	7	5
5	(New Zealand) Campbell Grayson & Martin Knight	9	5	9	9
4	(England) Nick Matthew & James Willstrop	4	9	5	6

Semi finals
2	(England) Beachill & Nicol	5	9	9	9
3	(Australia) Palmer & Jenson	9	4	6	4
1	(Australia) Boswell & Ricketts	9	11	11
5	(New Zealand) Grayson & Knight	6	9	9

Final
2	(England) Beachill & Nicol	7	9	9	10
1	(Australia) Boswell & Ricketts	9	7	1	8
Third place
3	(Australia) Palmer & Jenson	9	9	6	9
5	(New Zealand) Grayson & Knight	2	4	9	6

=== Women's doubles (21-26 March) ===
Semi finals
1	(Australia) Natalie Grinham & Rachael Grinham	5	9	9	9
3	(England) Tania Bailey & Vicky Botwright	9	3	3	6
2	(New Zealand) Shelley Kitchen & Tamsyn Leevey	3	8	9	9	9
4	(New Zealand) Lara Petera & Louise Crome	9	10	4	6	3

Final
1	(Australia) Grinham & Grinham	1	9	9	9
2	(New Zealand) Kitchen & Leevey	9	4	3	3
Bronze
3	(England) Bailey & Botwright	10	4	9	9
4	(New Zealand) Petera & Crome	8	9	4	6

=== Mixed doubles (21-26 March) ===
Quarter finals
3	(Australia) Joseph Kneipp & Natalie Grinham	9	7	9	9
9	(Wales) Gavin Jones & Tegwen Malik	7	9	5	5
1	(Australia) David Palmer & Rachael Grinham	9	9	11
7	(England) Adrian Grant & Alison Waters	1	6	9
4	(England) James Willstrop & Vicky Botwright	6	9	9	9
6	(New Zealand) Callum O'Brien & Lara Heta	9	5	7	6
2	(New Zealand) Glen Wilson & Shelley Kitchen	9	9	9
8	(South Africa) Craig Van der Wath & Diana Argyll	4	3	5

Semi finals
3	(Australia) Kneipp & Grinham N	9	9	3	3	9
1	(Australia) Palmer & Grinham R	7	7	9	9	7
4	(England) Willstrop & Botwright	3	6	13	9	9
2	(New Zealand) Wilson & Kitchen	9	9	11	3	3

Final
3	(Australia) Kneipp & Grinham N	6	9	9	9
4	(England) Willstrop & Botwright	9	6	5	6
Third place
1	(Australia) Palmer & Grinham R	9	9	9
2	(New Zealand) Wilson & Kitchen	4	6	6
