= Glanfield =

Glanfield is a surname. Notable people with the surname include:

- Jenny Glanfield, English author of the 'Hotel Quadriga trilogy'
- Jonathan Glanfield (born 1979), English sailor
- Richard Glanfield (born 1964), English squash player and coach
