= Tegwen Malik =

Welsh squash player (born 1975)

Personal information
- Nationality: British (Welsh)
- Born: 21 January 1975 (age 51) London, England
- Education: PhD (Biomimicry), MPhil (Medical Physics), BSc (Hons) Physics

Sport
- Handedness: Right Handed
- Turned pro: 1994
- Coached by: Chris Robertson & Adrian Davies
- Retired: 2008
- Racquet used: Grays & Karakal

Women's singles
- Highest ranking: World No. 16 (January 2000-2006)
- Titles: Welsh Closed Champion, Welsh Open, Finnish Open, Toulouse Open, Iceland Open, Washington Open
Medal record
Representing Wales
National Championships
Gold medal – first place	1992–93, 1995-98, 2002	singles

Tegwen Malik (born 21 January 1975) is a former professional squash player who represented Wales at the Commonwealth Games and was a multiple national champion. She reached a career-high world ranking of World No. 16 in January 2000.

== Biography ==
=== Squash career ===
At 17, Malik was the youngest ever winner of the Welsh National Squash Championships in 1992. She often competed in the top men's leagues in Wales and as the number one player in the "Professional Bundesleague" in Germany.

During her squash career she represented Wales at European team championships as their number 1 player, such as the one in Vienna where she beat Belguium’s Charlie de Rucker and Slovakia’s Linda Hruzikova. Malik also represented Wales in an International Test Series against South Africa in 2005 where the series culminated in Johannesburg where Malik partnered with Gavin Jones in the mixed doubles. She was also a regular player in the SRA National Squash League in the UK (which comprised four men and one woman teams) where she played for Devon and Exeter as their number 1 woman player. In the 1998/99 leagues the team reached the quarter finals where Malik lost in four games to Linda Charman (now called Linda Elriani) who was playing for Capital One Nottingham.

Malik joined the Women’s International Squash Players Association (WISPA) in 1994 and played 194 professional matches on the tour where she was seeded in 93 of the professional tournaments. On the WISPA tour, Malik won the Toulouse Open, Welsh Open and Iceland Open in 1999 and was runner-up of the Oslo Open in Norway (1999) losing to New Zealand's Shelley Kitchen in the final 3-1.

During her career as an Elite Cymru Athlete she suffered a serious illness that many thought would end her professional career as an athlete. However, after nearly three years off the professional squash circuit (from November 1999 to November 2002) she managed to recover and worked her way back up the world rankings from last to world number 16. After the illness, Malik's first tournament back on the professional circuit was the Washington Open (that was played in Seattle) and due to a long period off the squash circuit, she had to come through qualifying rounds to reach the main draw. She went on to win the tournament final in straight sets to Latasha Khan. Malik subsequently went on to compete in the Monte Carlo Squash Classic, beating several top world ranked players to reach the semi-finals where she lost to the number 2 seed Rebecca Macree.

Malik won a seventh Welsh national title in January 2002. but after being selected for the 2002 Commonwealth Games in Manchester she had to withdraw from the competition due to injury.

Malik won the 2004 Savcour Finnish Open in Mikkeli, Finland, where she beat the second seed Dominique Lloyd-Walter in the semi-finals and top seed Annelize Naude from the Netherlands in the final, in straight games (9/2, 9/5, 9/6).

She was semi finalist of a number of professional tournaments too: Monte Carlo Classic (2002) coming through qualifying to lose to second seed Rebecca Macree (9/7 3/9 9/2 9/4 in 47m) in the semis after beating two top seeds Pamela Nimmo (the No 4 seed) in the quarters and annelize naude (6th seed) in first round; Semi finalist of the Southport Open, Connecticut (2002); Semi finalist of the Forbes Women’s Southport Squash Open (2003) in Connecticut, losing to Natalie Grinham (who was the top seed) in five after being two sets up. During this tournament Tegwen came through qualifying rounds, beating two main draw seeds to reach the semis and overcoming the fourth seed New Zealander Shelley Kitchen in straight games in the quarterfinals; Semi finalist of the finish open (2003) losing to Salma Shabana, the fourth seed from Egypt (9-5, 9-5, 9-5); the KC Premier Centenary Cup Hong Kong (2004); the Malaysia Airlines KL Open Squash Championships (2004) losing to world number 1 Nicol David 9-5 in the fifth and beating a number of seeds en route, namely the number 4 seed (Rebecca Chui who was the reigning Asian Games champion at the time) and number 6 seed (Sharon Wee); Irish open (2005) losing to Annelize Naude (4th seed); the Monte Carlo classic (2006) having been unseeded.

Malik was a quarter finalist of the SquashWorks Open (2004) where she beat 8th seed Sharon Wee in three straight sets; the Hurghada International (2006) losing the 2nd seed Omneya Abdel Kawy.

For two years Tegwen played for Devon and Exeter in the SRA National Leagues as their top female player in the squad.During her career she also represented Wales at the World and European Team championships, home internationals and during different test series such as Wales verses South Africa.

Malik often paired with Gavin Jones for mixed doubles events, with the duo winning a test series against the National Irish team in Belfast. Malik represented the Welsh team at the 2006 Commonwealth Games in Melbourne, Australia, where she competed in the singles and mixed doubles events. In the mixed doubles with Gavin Jones, they narrowly lost in the quarter-finals to the Australian pair (Natalie Grinham and Joseph Kneipp) who went on to win the gold. Malik was a well-respected player on the professional tour and was well known for her athletic abilities on the court.

=== Personal life ===
Off the squash court, Malik studied physics at Bristol University (where she was awarded the prestigious Bristol Red for her sporting achievements) and went on to work in the field of medical physics as a researcher before doing her PhD in biomimicry. She has published several articles in peer reviewed journals in this field and was invited to give a guest talk on this research at MIT. Tegwen subsequently went on to work for Lifescaped, a company specialising in the field of biomimicry and is now an associate professor at Swansea University lecturing in the areas on operations, strategy, analytics and international standards. During this time she co-authored a book on International Standards bringing this content into her teaching around ISO and BSI standards.

Tegwen is unrelated to the Malik family of squash players Perry, Curtis, Torrie, Heston and Bailey.
