= Cleveland Classic 2015 =

Cleveland Squash Classic 2015
- 7th Cleveland Classic

Details
- Event name: Cleveland Squash Classic 2015
- Location: Cleveland, Ohio, United States
- Venue: Cleveland Racket Club
- Website www.squashsite.co.uk/2009/cleveland2015.htm

Men's Winner
- Category: International 50
- Prize money: $50,000
- Year: World Tour 2015

The Cleveland Squash Classic 2015 is the women's edition of the 2015 Cleveland Classic, which is a tournament of the PSA World Tour event International (Prize money : 50 000 $). The event took place at the Cleveland Racket Club in Cleveland, Ohio in United States from 29 January to 3 February. Nicol David won her third Cleveland Classic trophy, beating Raneem El Weleily in the final.

== Prize money and ranking points ==
For 2015, the prize purse was $50,000. The prize money and points breakdown is as follows:

Prize Money Cleveland Classic (2015)
Event	W	F	SF	QF	1R
Points (PSA)	2450	1610	980	595	350
Prize money	$8,550	$5,850	$3,825	$2,365	$1,350

== Seeds ==
1. (Malaysia) Nicol David (champion)
2. (England) Laura Massaro (semifinals)
3. (Egypt) Raneem El Weleily (final)
4. (Egypt) Nour El Sherbini (first round)
5. (England) Alison Waters (first round)
6. (France) Camille Serme (quarterfinals)
7. (Malaysia) Low Wee Wern (quarterfinals)
8. (Egypt) Nour El Tayeb (quarterfinals)

== Draw and results ==
First round
1	(Malaysia) Nicol David	11	11	11
Q	(England) Emily Whitlock	2	5	7
Q	(England) Victoria Lust	9	6	7
8	(Egypt) Nour El Tayeb	11	11	11
5	(England) Alison Waters	9	11	9	9
(Egypt) Omneya Abdel Kawy	11	3	11	11
(Hong Kong) Annie Au	11	5	7	11	11
4	(Egypt) Nour El Sherbini	6	11	11	9	6
3	(Egypt) Raneem El Weleily
(Republic of Ireland) Madeline Perry	3	4	11	4
(England) Jenny Duncalf	6	6	5
6	(France) Camille Serme	11	11	11
7	(Malaysia) Low Wee Wern	11	11	11
Q	(Egypt) Yathreb Adel	8	6	6
Q	(England) Sarah Kippax	3	8	3
2	(England) Laura Massaro	11	11	11

Quarter finals
1	(Malaysia) Nicol David	11	11	11
8	(Egypt) Nour El Tayeb	3	6	8
(Egypt) Omneya Abdel Kawy	11	11	11
(Hong Kong) Annie Au	8	8	5
3	(Egypt) Raneem El Weleily	6	11	6	11	11
6	(France) Camille Serme	11	7	11	4	6
7	(Malaysia) Low Wee Wern	11	5	5	11
2	(England) Laura Massaro	7	11	11	13

Semi finals
1	(Malaysia) Nicol David	11	11	11
(Egypt) Omneya Abdel Kawy	8	2	7
3	(Egypt) Raneem El Weleily	11	11	13	11	12
2	(England) Laura Massaro	13	7	15	9	10

Final
1	(Malaysia) Nicol David	11	11	11
3	(Egypt) Raneem El Weleily	5	9	4

== See also ==
- Cleveland Classic
- 2015 PSA World Tour
