= Asian Sportsman of the year =

The Asian Sports Award (ASA) is a recognition programme conceived by Stropt and Sports Limited (HK) in collaboration with the Asian Sports Press Union (ASPU). Its aim is to honour, champion and promote the world-class sports heroes of Asia. They named Liu Xiang and Nicol Ann David as the recipients of the inaugural Asian Sportsman and Sportswoman of the Year awards.

== Asian Sportsman of the Year Award Winner ==
- 2007: (China) Liu Xiang Event: Athletics

== Asian Sportswoman of the Year Award Winner ==
- 2007: (Malaysia) Nicol Ann David Event: Squash

== Asian Team of the Year (Men) Winner ==
- 2007: (South Korea) Lee Ho-Suk, Ahn Hyun-Soo, Seo Ho-Jin, Song Suk-Woo Event: Short track speed skating

== Asian Team of the Year (Women) Winner ==
- 2007: (China) Gao Ling, Huang Sui Event: Badminton

== Lifetime achievement award ==
- 2007: (India) Ramanathan Krishnan Event: Tennis

== Asian Sportsman of the year ==
- 2007: (Pakistan) Shahid Afridi Event: Cricket
