= Desmond David =

Malaysian footballer

Personal information
- Date of birth: 1947 (age 78–79)
- Place of birth: Penang, Federation of Malaya
- Position: Goalkeeper

Senior career*
Years	Team	Apps	(Gls)
1967–1980	Penang		

International career
- Malaysia
- * Club domestic league appearances and goals

Desmond David (Tamil: டெசுமண்ட் டேவிட், romanized: Ṭesmaṇṭ ṭēviṭ; born in 1947) is a retired Malaysian footballer who played for Penang and the national team as a goalkeeper. In 1974, he was part of the Malaysia Cup-winning Penang side.

== Personal life ==
Desmond David is a Malaysian Indian of Tamil descent. His daughter, Nicol David was the former squash world champion.

== Honours ==
=== Club ===
Penang

- Malaya Cup

Winners: 1974
