= Richard Glanfield =

English squash player and coach

Richard Glanfield (born 11 June 1964 in Ely, Cambridgeshire) is a squash coach and former professional squash player from Shropshire, England.

Since turning professional in 1983, Glanfield has gained most of his coaching experience working outside his native England. He became the world's youngest international squash coach aged 21 years old when coaching Cyprus at the European Championships 1986 Aix-en-Provence, France.

Since then Glanfield has coached in the Netherlands, Spain, France and as national coach of Malaysia, Peru, and most recently Trinidad and Tobago.

In Malaysia he spent 11 years as national elite coach and is most well known for developing the talents of Nicol David, the woman's world number 1 squash player for a record 9 years, whom he coached from the age of 11 years, from 1995 to 2002.

Glanfield is the only national coach to have coached national teams at the European, asian, south American, Pan American and Caribbean team championships, as well as the Commonwealth Games and AsianGames

Since Moving to the United States in 2012 Glanfield spent four years coaching in Las Vegas and Santa Barbara, before taking over the post as the director of squash at The Baldwin School, Philadelphia

Glanfield is now the head of men’s and woman’s squash at Dickinson College, Carlisle, Pennsylvania .
