= Rebecca Botwright =

British squash player (born 1982)

Personal information
- Born: 22 January 1982 (age 44) Manchester, England

Sport
- Country: England
- Handedness: Right Handed
- Turned pro: 2001
- Coached by: Malcolm Willstrop
- Retired: Active
- Racquet used: Dunlop

Women's singles
- Highest ranking: No. 26 (April 2006)
- Current ranking: No. 140 (December 2009)
- Updated on 23 December 2009

Rebecca "Becky" Botwright, (born 22 January 1982 in Manchester), is an English squash player. She reached a career-high world ranking of No. 26 in April 2006.

Becky is the younger sister of Vicky Botwright, who was also a professional squash player.
