= Melissa Martin =

American chef

Melissa M. Martin is a New Orleans chef and restaurant owner. She has written two books, Mosquito Supper Club and Bayou.

== Early life ==
Martin grew up in Chauvin, Louisiana where she was one of six kids in her family.

== Career ==
In 2014 Martin started preparing food in pop up locations in Louisiana. During this period Martin charged a flat fee and people came in to eat, listen to music, and interact with other diners. In 2016 she opened a restaurant in New Orleans, the Mosquito Supper. The restaurant that provides a tasting menu of home-style food, which The New York Times named as one of the best restaurants in New Orleans in 2023.

In 2020 Martin changed how her restaurant served meals in response to limitations imposed by the city of New Orleans during the COVID-19 pandemic.

In her writing Martin shares stories of food and cooking, recipes, and details on the challenges for the community that lives in coastal Louisiana.

== Selected publications ==
- Martin, Melissa; Culbert, Denny (2020). Mosquito Supper Club: cajun recipes from a disappearing Bayou. New York: Artisan, a division of Workman Publishing Co., Inc. ISBN 978-1-57965-847-2.
- Martin, Melissa; Culbert, Denny (2024). Bayou: feasting through the seasons of a Cajun life. New York, NY: Artisan. ISBN 978-1-64829-140-1.

== Awards and honors ==
In 2022 and 2023 Martin was a semifinalist south region as best chef for the James Beard Foundation Award. Her 2022 cookbook received the James Beard Award for best new cookbook the category of U.S. roadways.
