= Suzie Pierrepont =

English squash player (born 1985)

Personal information
- Born: 3 January 1985 (age 41) Stoke-on-Trent, England
- Height: 6 ft 0 in (1.83 m)

Sport
- Country: England
- Handedness: Right Handed
- Turned pro: 2002
- Coached by: Shane Coleman; Damon Leedale-Brown
- Retired: Active
- Racquet used: Harrow

Women's singles and doubles
- Highest ranking: No. 25 (August 2009)
- Current ranking: No. 35 (December 2009)
- Updated on 23 December 2009

Suzie Pierrepont (born 3 January 1985 in Stoke-on-Trent, Staffordshire, England), is a professional squash player who represented England as a junior. She reached a career-high world ranking of World No. 25 in August 2009.

== Professional career ==
2008 WSA Macau Open winner

2016 Women's World Doubles Gold Medalist

2016 Mixed World Doubles Bronze Medalist .
