= Salma Shabana =

Egyptian squash player (born 1976)

Personal information
- Full name: Salma Shabana
- Born: October 8, 1976 (age 49) Cairo, Egypt
- Years active: 1993

Sport
- Country: Egypt
- Highest ranking: 20 (September 2000)

Salma Shabana (born 8 October 1976) has the distinction of being the first female professional squash player from Egypt. She reached a career high ranking of World No. 20 in September 2000. She is the sister of former male Professional Squash Association (PSA) world No. 1 squash player, Amr Shabana. She lives in Cairo with her husband Omar El Borolossy, also a squash player who represented Egypt internationally, and their three children.
