= Annelize Naudé =

Dutch squash player

Personal information
- Nickname: Nudie
- Born: 1 January 1977 (age 49) Kempton Park, South Africa

Sport
- Country: Netherlands
- Handedness: Right Handed
- Turned pro: 1996
- Coached by: Liz Irving
- Retired: 2010
- Racquet used: Harrow

Women's singles
- Highest ranking: No. 13 (January 2006)
- Updated on March 2017

Annelize Naudé (born 1 January 1977) is a Dutch former professional squash player. She reached a career-high world ranking of World No. 13 in January 2006, and won five WISPA tour titles as well as being the runner-up nine times since 1996. She retired as a professional player in 2010.

== Professional career ==
Naudé's international squash career began in 1996; her world ranking after her first year was No. 53. She climbed up the rankings to No. 36 two years later, but her rankings then fell to a career low of No. 86 in May 2000. Her ranking rose again to No. 25 in late 2001, and she reached No. 20 a year later. She achieved her career best ranking of No. 13 four years later, in January 2006.

Naudé reached her first final in an international tournament in 1999 in the Danish Open, but she was subsequently defeated by Pamela Nimmo. Naudé won her first professional title in 2002, also in the Danish Open, when she beat Senga Macfie in the final which lasts in five sets 3–9, 4–9, 9–5, 9–3, 9–4. She then had to wait for two years for her second title, this time in the Swiss Open, beating Laura-Jane Lengthorn in the final. Naudé then lost to former world No. 1 Vanessa Atkinson in the final of Mexican Open.

Naudé appeared in her 12th WISPA World Tour final at the Internation de Creteil in France; she then won the match by beating England’s Lauren Siddall to the fourth title of her career.

== Personal life ==
Naudé grew up in South Africa before moving to the Netherlands. She was based at Kempton Park Country Club and was coached in her early days by Phillip Schlebusch and Jean Grainger, which took her to national titles at various junior levels before she moved to Amsterdam and eventually took on Dutch nationality and become a fixture in their national team.

Annelize, since retiring from squash at the end of 2010, has become a qualified audio engineer and DJ.

== Career statistics ==
Listed as the following: -

=== Professional Tour Titles (5) ===
All Results for Annelize Naudé in WISPA World's Tour tournament

Legend WISPA Platinum Series (0) WISPA Gold Series (0) WISPA Silver Series (0) WISPA Tour Series (5)	Titles by Major Tournaments World Open (0) British Open (0) Hong Kong Open (0) Qatar Classic (0)

No.	Date	Tournament	Opponent in Final	Score in Final
1.	20 February 2002	Danish Open	(Scotland) Senga Macfie	3–9, 4–9, 9–5, 9–3, 9–4
2.	14 March 2004	Swiss Open	(England) Laura-Jane Lengthorn	9–6, 9–5, 9–7
3.	24 February 2008	De Creteil	(England) Lauren Siddall	9–2, 8–10, 9–3, 9–4
4.	15 March 2009	Eindhoven Open	(England) Victoria Lust	11–2, 11–2, 11–6
5.	19 September 2009	Squashshine Open	(Egypt) Kanzy Emad El Defrawy	13–15, 11–6, 11–8, 11–6

=== WISPA Tour Finals (runner-up) (9) ===
No.	Date	Tournament	Opponent in Final	Score in Final
1.	21 February 1999	Danish Open	(Scotland) Pamela Nimmo	5–9, 10–8, 9–2, 9–7
2.	29 October 2000	Springside Open	(New Zealand) Carol Owens	9–1, 9–2, 9–2
3.	17 June 2001	Singapore Open	(New Zealand) Shelley Kitchen	9–7, 9–4, 9–2
4.	8 March 2004	Finnish Open	(Wales) Tegwen Malik	9–2, 9–5, 9–6
5.	5 September 2004	Mexican Open	(Netherlands) Vanessa Atkinson	9–4, 9–1, 9–2
6.	6 February 2005	Kuala Lumpur Open	(Malaysia) Nicol David	9–4, 9–2, 9–0
7.	16 April 2005	Irish Open	(Republic of Ireland) Madeline Perry	9–4, 2–9, 7–9, 9–4, 9–6
8.	3 July 2007	NSC Super Satellite No. 2	(Hong Kong) Rebecca Chiu	10–8, 9–2, 9–1
9.	16 December 2009	Flowerbulb Open	(England) Emma Beddoes	11–8, 11–2, 11–6
