= Runa Reta =

Canadian squash player (born 1980)

Personal information
- Born: December 14, 1980 (age 45) Ottawa, Ontario, Canada

Sport
- Country: Canada
- Handedness: Right Handed
- Turned pro: 2001
- Coached by: Heather Wallace
- Racquet used: Black Knight

Women's singles
- Highest ranking: No. 29 (October, 2007)
- Title: 2
- Tour final: 5
- Updated on August 2013

Runa Reta (born December 14, 1980) is a Canadian former professional squash player, who competed on the women's tour. She has left Bermuda and Patrick Foster has assumed the duties of her role.
