= Tamsyn Leevey =

New Zealand squash player (born 1978)

Medal record

Women's squash

Representing New Zealand

World Team Championships
Bronze medal – third place	2004 Amsterdam	Team

World Doubles Championships
Gold medal – first place	2006 Melbourne	Doubles

Commonwealth Games
Silver medal – second place	2006 Melbourne	Doubles

Tamsyn Leevey (born 24 January 1978, in Taumarunui, New Zealand) is a New Zealand former professional squash player. At the 2006 Commonwealth Games in Melbourne, Australia, she won a silver medal in the women's doubles, partnering Shelley Kitchen. Earlier in the year, Leevey and Kitchen won the women's doubles title at the World Doubles Squash Championships. She also won the bronze medal at the 2004 Women's World Team Squash Championships.
