= Vicky Botwright =

British squash player

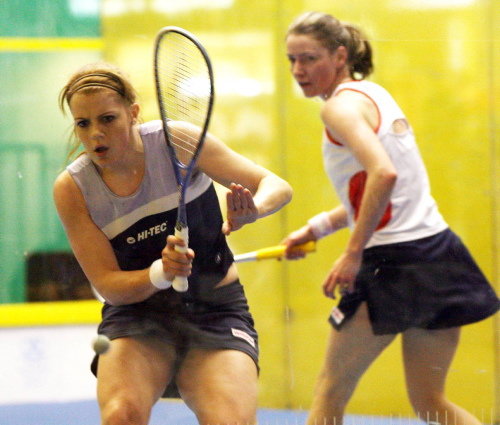
- Vicky Botwright (right) with Vanessa Atkinson, 2007

Personal information
- Nationality: British (English)
- Born: 18 June 1977 (age 49) Manchester, England

Sport
- Turned pro: 1997
- Coached by: David Pearson & Paul Carter
- Retired: 2009
- Racquet used: Wilson

Women's singles
- Highest ranking: No. 5 (December 2005)
- Title: 4
- Tour final: 15
- World Open: F (2008)
Medal record
Women's squash
Representing England
World Championships
| Silver medal – second place | 2008 Manchester | Singles |
World Team Championships
| Gold medal – first place | 2006 Edmonton | Team |
Commonwealth Games
| Silver medal – second place | 2006 Melbourne | Mixed doubles |
| Bronze medal – third place | 2006 Melbourne | Doubles |
European Team Championships
| Gold medal – first place | 2004 Rennes | Team |
| Gold medal – first place | 2005 Amsterdam | Team |
| Gold medal – first place | 2006 Vienna | Team |
| Gold medal – first place | 2007 Riccione | Team |
| Gold medal – first place | 2008 Amsterdam | Team |

Victoria Botwright (born 18 June 1977) is a squash coach and former professional squash player from England. She reached a career-high world ranking of World No. 5 in 2005. In 2008, she finished runner-up at the World Open, losing in the final to Nicol David 11–5, 1–11, 6–11, 9–11.

== Biography ==
Botwright was a member of the England team which won the World Team Championships in 2006. Also in 2006, she represented the 2006 England team, at the 2006 Commonwealth Games in Melbourne, Australia, competing in three events she won a silver medal in the mixed doubles partnering James Willstrop and a bronze medal in the women's doubles, partnering Tania Bailey.

After she was defeated by Nicol David in the World Open in 2008, she said "What a great way to finish though, I'm definitely going to cry, but I'd like to thanks England Squash, EIS and the performance programme, they supported me even when I was rubbish ... the England girls, we were a great team, and especially my parents who supported me, shouted at me, comforted me when I needed it. And my future husband Stewart, I hope we have a happy marriage and life together."

Botwright won five consecutive gold medals for the England women's national squash team at the European Squash Team Championships from 2004 to 2008.

Botwright caused a controversy which gained considerable media attention in 2004, when she announced plans to appear on court at tournaments wearing in a bikini-style outfit consisting of a sports bra and thong briefs, and posed for photographs wearing the outfit. However the Women's International Squash Players Association (WISPA), refused to grant permission for her to play in the outfit. Her popularity and fame increased after the incident, though afterwards she stated that the whole idea of "skimpy" clothing on-court was a publicity stunt dreamed up by the members of WISPA. She went on to say that she was selected as the player to wear the clothing. She also said that this was not her idea at all, and that she did not think the incident would become so infamous.

Botwright now works as a squash coach having retired from the international tour in October 2008. She continues to make appearances as a player in Premier League Squash in England.

Vicky is the elder sister of Becky Botwright, who is also a squash player.

== Major results ==
=== World Open ===
| Outcome | Year | Location | Opponent in the final | Score in the final |
|---|---|---|---|---|
| Runner-up | 2008 | Manchester, England | (Malaysia) Nicol David | 5–11, 11–1, 11–6, 11–9 |

=== World Series final appearances ===
Qatar Classic

| Outcome | Year | Opponent in the final | Score in the final |
|---|---|---|---|
| Runner-up | 2005 | (Netherlands) Vanessa Atkinson | 9–7, 9–4, 9–2 |

== See also ==
- Official Women's Squash World Ranking
