= Shelley Kitchen =

New Zealand squash player (born 1979)

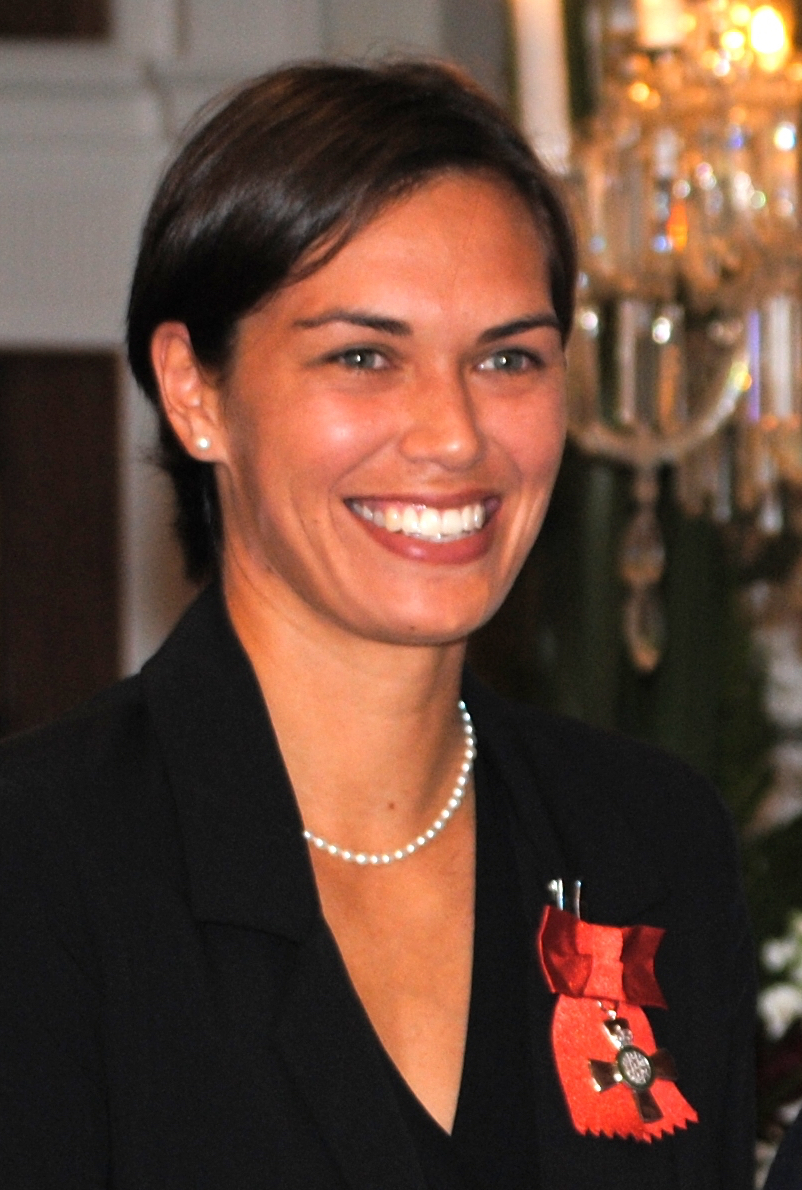
- Kitchen in 2011

Personal information
- Born: 2 December 1979 (age 46) Kaitaia, New Zealand
- Height: 5 ft 10 in (178 cm)

Sport
- Country: New Zealand
- Turned pro: 2000
- Coached by: Nick Taylor
- Retired: 2010
- Racquet used: Harrow

Women's singles
- Highest ranking: 6 (September 2008)
Medal record
Women's squash
Representing New Zealand
World Team Championships
Bronze medal – third place	1998 Stuttgart	Team
Bronze medal – third place	2000 Sheffield	Team
Bronze medal – third place	2002 Odense	Team
Bronze medal – third place	2004 Amsterdam	Team
World Doubles Championships
Gold medal – first place	2006 Melbourne	Doubles
Silver medal – second place	2004 Chennai	Mixed doubles
Commonwealth Games
Silver medal – second place	2006 Melbourne	Doubles
Bronze medal – third place	2006 Melbourne	Singles
- Updated on 12 April 2022

Shelley Celia Kitchen MNZM (born 2 December 1979, in Kaitaia, New Zealand) is a New Zealand professional squash player.

At the 2006 Commonwealth Games in Melbourne, Victoria, Australia, Kitchen beat World No. 1 Nicol David of Malaysia in the third-place match to capture the women's singles bronze medal. She also won a silver medal in the women's doubles, partnering Tamsyn Leevey. Earlier in the year, Kitchen and Leevey won the women's doubles title at the World Doubles Squash Championships. In 2004, Kitchen finished runner-up in the mixed doubles at the World Doubles Squash Championships, partnering Glen Wilson.

Kitchen had her first child in February 2010. After getting sick in an attempt to come back for the 2010 Commonwealth Games, she announced her retirement in December 2010. In the 2011 New Year Honours, Kitchen was appointed a Member of the New Zealand Order of Merit for services to sport.

== See also ==
- Official Women's Squash World Ranking
- WISPA Awards

Awards and achievements
Preceded by Nicolette Fernandes	WISPA Most Improved Player of the Year; 2007	Succeeded by Laura Lengthorn-Massaro
