= Isabelle Stoehr =

French squash player

Personal information
- Born: June 9, 1979 (age 47) Tours, France

Sport
- Country: France
- Handedness: Right
- Turned pro: 1996
- Coached by: Jean-Luc Bonetat
- Retired: 2011
- Racquet used: Wilson

Women's singles
- Highest ranking: 10 (February, 2009)
- Updated on May 14, 2009

Isabelle Stoehr (born June 9, 1979, in Tours) is a professional squash player from France.

== Career statistics ==
Listed below

=== Professional Tour Titles (9) ===
All Results for Isabelle Stoehr in WISPA World's Tour tournament

| Legend WISPA Platinum Series (0) WISPA Gold Series (0) WISPA Silver Series (0) WISPA Tour Series (9) | Titles by Major Tournaments World Open (0) British Open (0) Hong Kong Open (0) Qatar Classic (0) |

| No. | Date | Tournament | Opponent in Final | Score in Final |
|---|---|---|---|---|
| 1. | February, 2000 | French National | (France) Corinne Castets | Unknown |
| 2. | September 22, 2001 | Tuborg Open | (Denmark) Ellen Petersen | 9–10, 5–9, 9–0, 9–6, 9–0 |
| 3. | February 2, 2002 | French National | (France) Corinne Castets | Unknown |
| 4. | February 16, 2003 | French National | (France) Corinne Castets | Unknown |
| 5. | May, 2003 | Open de la Cite | (Denmark) Ellen Petersen | 9–7, 9–5, 9–2 |
| 6. | May 24, 2003 | Brest Open | (Denmark) Ellen Petersen | 9–3, 9–1, 9–0 |
| 7. | August 24, 2006 | Alexandria Open | (Egypt) Raneem El Weleily | 9–6, 9–2, 6–9, 9–0 |
| 8. | February 19, 2007 | Lakeshore Open | (Australia) Kasey Brown | 9–4, 9–3, 9–5 |
| 9. | January 6, 2008 | Open du Gard | (France) Célia Allamargot | 9–0, 9–3, 9–6 |

Note: (ret) = retired, min = minutes, h = hours

=== WISPA Tour Finals (runner-up) (6) ===
| No. | Date | Tournament | Opponent in Final | Score in Final |
|---|---|---|---|---|
| 1. | Unknown, 2000 | Open de la Cite | (England) Sue Wright | 8–10, 9–6, 4–9, 9–3, 9–2 |
| 2. | October 29, 2000 | Grasshopper Cup | (England) Jenny Tranfield | 9–3, 9–5, 9–4 |
| 3. | May 11, 2002 | Italia Open | (Republic of Ireland) Madeline Perry | 9–6, 1–9, 10–8, 9–0 |
| 4. | May, 2002 | Adelaide Open | (England) Jenny Tranfield | 6–9, 10–8, 9–0, 9–2 |
| 5. | September 30, 2005 | Alexandria Open | (Egypt) Engy Kheirallah | 6–9, 9–4, 9–10, 9–1, 9–2 |
| 6. | March 10, 2007 | Burning River Classic | (United States) Natalie Grainger | 9–7, 10–8, 9–1 |
