= Rebecca Chiu =

Hong Kong squash player (born 1978)

Personal information
- Born: Chiu Wing Yin; November 24, 1978 (age 47) British Hong Kong

Sport
- Country: Hong Kong
- Handedness: Right
- Turned pro: 1993
- Coached by: Tony Choi
- Retired: 2010
- Racquet used: Prince O3 Black

Women's singles
- Highest ranking: 13 (October, 2007)
- Title: 16
- Tour final: 25
Medal record
Women's squash
Representing Hong Kong
Asian Games
| Gold medal – first place | 2002 Busan | Singles |
| Silver medal – second place | 1998 Bangkok | Singles |
| Silver medal – second place | 2006 Doha | Singles |
| Silver medal – second place | 2010 Guangzhou | Team |
- Updated on December 2016

Chiu Wing Yin Rebecca (Chinese: 趙詠賢; Jyutping: ziu^{6} wing^{6} jin^{4}, born 24 November 1978 in Hong Kong), commonly known as Rebecca Chiu, is a retired female professional squash player from Hong Kong. Her highest world ranking is 13, achieved in October 2007. She became the women's singles Asian champion at the 2002 Asian Games.

== See also ==
- Official Women's Squash World Ranking
