= 2011 in squash sport =

This article lists the results for the sport of squash in 2011.

== 2011 PSA World Tour ==
- 2011 PSA World Series
  - (United States) Tournament of Champions (January 21–27): (Egypt) Ramy Ashour defeated (England) Nick Matthew 11-3, 7-11, 11-9, 11-7.
  - (United States) North American Open (February 20–26): (England) Nick Matthew defeated (Egypt) Ramy Ashour 11-9, 11-5, 8-11, 8-11, 11-6.
  - (Australia) Australian Open (August 8–14): (Egypt) Ramy Ashour defeated (England) Nick Matthew 12-14, 11-6, 10-12, 11-8, 11-4.
  - (England) British Grand Prix (September 19–25): (Egypt) Ramy Ashour defeated (England) Nick Matthew 3-11, 11-3, 11-7, 11-4.
  - (United States) US Open (September 30–October 6): (Egypt) Amr Shabana defeated (England) Nick Matthew 11-9, 8-11, 11-2, 11-4.
  - Qatar Classic (October 16–21): (France) Grégory Gaultier defeated (England) James Willstrop 11-8, 11-7, 2-11, 11-8.
  - Hong Kong Open (November 15–20): (England) James Willstrop defeated (Egypt) Karim Darwish 11-5, 11-9, 11-4.
  - Kuwait PSA Cup (November 23–29): (England) James Willstrop defeated (Egypt) Karim Darwish 11-9, 10-12, 11-4, 11-2.
  - (India) PSA Masters (December 12–18): (England) James Willstrop defeated (France) Grégory Gaultier 19-21, 11-8, 11-4, 6-1.
- PSA World Series Finals at London, England. January 4–8, 2012
  - (Egypt) Amr Shabana defeated (France) Grégory Gaultier 6-11, 12-10, 11-7, 7-11, 11-8.
- PSA World Championship at Rotterdam, Netherlands. November 1–6, 2011
  - (England) Nick Matthew defeated (France) Grégory Gaultier 6-11, 11-9, 11-6, 11-5.

== 2011 WSA World Tour ==
- 2011 WSA World Series
  - Cayman Islands Open (April 4–9): (Malaysia) Nicol David defeated (England) Jenny Duncalf 11-7, 11-6, 12-14, 11-4.
  - (Malaysia) Malaysian Open (July 19–23): (Malaysia) Nicol David defeated (England) Jenny Duncalf 11-6, 12-10, 11-5.
  - (Australia) Australian Open (August 8–14): (Malaysia) Nicol David defeated (England) Jenny Duncalf 11-8, 11-4, 11-6.
  - (United States) US Open (October 1–6): (England) Laura Massaro defeated (Australia) Kasey Brown 5-11, 11-5, 11-3, 11-5.
  - Qatar Classic (October 16–21): (Malaysia) Nicol David defeated (Republic of Ireland) Madeline Perry 11-2, 11-7, 11-3.
  - Hong Kong Open (December 4–8): (Malaysia) Nicol David defeated (Egypt) Raneem El Weleily 11-5, 11-4, 11-9.
- WSA World Series Finals at London, England. January 4–8, 2012
  - (Malaysia) Nicol David defeated (Republic of Ireland) Madeline Perry 11-9, 11-9, 11-9.
- 2011 Women's World Open Squash Championship at Rotterdam, Netherlands. November 1–6, 2011
  - (Malaysia) Nicol David defeated (England) Jenny Duncalf 11-2, 11-5, 11-0.

== WSF World Team Squash Championships ==
- (Germany) Men's World Team Championships
  - (gold) Egypt, (silver) England, (bronze) Australia
