= 2011 WSA World Tour =

WSA World Tour 2011

Details
- Event name: WSA World Tour 2011
- Categories: WSA World Open; WSA World Series (6); WSA World Series Finals; WSA Gold & Silver (15)
- Website www.wsaworldtour.com

Achievements
- World Number 1: (Malaysia) Nicol David (12 months)
- World Champion: (Malaysia) Nicol David

Awards
- Player of the year: (England) Laura Massaro
- Young player of the year: (Egypt) Nour El Tayeb
- Most improved player of the year: (Egypt) Raneem El Weleily

The WSA World Tour 2011 is the international squash tour and organized circuit, organized by the Women's Squash Association (WSA) for the 2011 squash season. The most important tournament in the series is the World Open held in Rotterdam in the Netherlands. The tour features three categories of regular events, the World Series, which features the highest prize money and the best fields, Gold and Silver tournaments. The Tour is concluded by the WSA World Series Finals, the end of season championship for the top 8 rated players.

== 2011 Calendar ==
=== World Open ===
Tournament	Date	Champion	Runner-up	Semifinalists	Quarterfinalists
World Open 2011 (Netherlands) Rotterdam, Netherlands; World Open - World Series Platinum $143,000 - Draw	1–6 November 2011	(Malaysia) Nicol David; 11-2, 11-5, 11-0	(England) Jenny Duncalf	(Netherlands) Natalie Grinham (Mexico) Samantha Terán	(England) Laura Massaro (Australia) Kasey Brown (Malaysia) Low Wee Wern (India) Dipika Pallikal

=== World Series ===
Tournament	Date	Champion	Runner-up	Semifinalists	Quarterfinalists
Cayman Islands Open 2011; Cayman Islands; World Series Gold $68,500 - Draw	4–9 April 2011	(Malaysia) Nicol David; 11-7, 11-6, 12-14, 11-4	(England) Jenny Duncalf	(Australia) Rachael Grinham (Australia) Donna Urquhart	(Republic of Ireland) Madeline Perry (France) Camille Serme (England) Sarah Kippax (Netherlands) Natalie Grinham
Malaysian Open Squash Championships 2011 (Malaysia) Kuala Lumpur, Malaysia; World Series Gold $68,500 - Draw	19–23 July 2011	(Malaysia) Nicol David; 11-6, 12-10, 11-5	(England) Jenny Duncalf	(Egypt) Omneya Abdel Kawy (France) Camille Serme	(Australia) Rachael Grinham (Australia) Kasey Brown (England) Laura Massaro (New Zealand) Joelle King
Australian Open 2011 (Australia) Canberra, Australia; World Series Gold $74,000 - Draw	8–14 August 2011	(Malaysia) Nicol David; 11-8, 11-4, 11-6	(England) Jenny Duncalf	(Australia) Rachael Grinham (Republic of Ireland) Madeline Perry	(Hong Kong) Annie Au (Australia) Donna Urquhart (New Zealand) Joelle King (Netherlands) Natalie Grinham
US Open 2011 (United States) Philadelphia, United States; World Series Gold $60,000 - Draw	1–6 October 2011	(England) Laura Massaro; 5-11, 11-5, 11-3, 11-5	(Australia) Kasey Brown	(England) Jenny Duncalf (Republic of Ireland) Madeline Perry	(Malaysia) Nicol David (Australia) Rachael Grinham (France) Camille Serme (Hong Kong) Annie Au
Qatar Classic 2011; Doha, Qatar; World Series Gold $74,000 - Draw	16–21 October 2011	(Malaysia) Nicol David; 11-2, 11-7, 11-3	(Republic of Ireland) Madeline Perry	(Australia) Rachael Grinham (Egypt) Nour El Tayeb	(Egypt) Raneem El Weleily (Malaysia) Low Wee Wern (England) Emma Beddoes (Egypt) Nour El Sherbini
Hong Kong Open 2011; Hong Kong, China; World Series Gold $74,000 - Draw	14–20 November 2011	(Malaysia) Nicol David; 11-5, 11-4, 11-9	(Egypt) Raneem El Weleily	(Hong Kong) Annie Au (Malaysia) Low Wee Wern	(Australia) Rachael Grinham (England) Laura Massaro (France) Camille Serme (Hong Kong) Joey Chan

Final tournament	Date	Champion	Runner-up	Semifinalists	Round Robin
WSA World Series Finals 2011 (England) Queen's Club, London, England; WSA World Series Finals $50,000 - Draw	4–8 January 2012	(Malaysia) Nicol David; 11-9, 11-9, 11-9	(Republic of Ireland) Madeline Perry	(England) Jenny Duncalf (England) Laura Massaro	(Australia) Rachael Grinham (France) Camille Serme (Malaysia) Low Wee Wern (Australia) Donna Urquhart

=== Gold 50 ===
Tournament	Date	Champion	Runner-up	Semifinalists	Quarterfinalists
Cleveland Classic 2011 (United States) Cleveland, United States; Gold 50 $55,800	29 January - 2 February 2011	(England) Laura Massaro; 11-9, 11-7, 9-11, 11-8	(Malaysia) Nicol David	(Republic of Ireland) Madeline Perry (Hong Kong) Annie Au	(England) Jenny Duncalf (Netherlands) Natalie Grinham (United States) Amanda Sobhy (England) Sarah Kippax
Kuala Lumpur Open Squash Championships 2011 (Malaysia) Kuala Lumpur, Malaysia; Gold 50 $53,500	16–20 March 2011	(Malaysia) Nicol David; 11-6, 11-6, 11-2	(Republic of Ireland) Madeline Perry	(England) Alison Waters (Hong Kong) Annie Au	(Australia) Rachael Grinham (Australia) Kasey Brown (France) Camille Serme (Hong Kong) Joey Chan
Singapore Women's Masters 2011; Singapore; Gold 50 $53,500	26–30 July 2011	(Republic of Ireland) Madeline Perry; 11-7, 11-8, 5-11, 11-9	(England) Laura Massaro	(Malaysia) Nicol David (France) Camille Serme	(Australia) Rachael Grinham (Australia) Kasey Brown (Hong Kong) Annie Au (New Zealand) Jaclyn Hawkes
Carol Weymuller Open 2011 (United States) Brooklyn, United States; Gold 50 $50,400	22–25 September 2011	(Egypt) Raneem El Weleily; 11-7, 15-13, 11-4	(England) Jenny Duncalf	(Republic of Ireland) Madeline Perry (Australia) Kasey Brown	(Australia) Rachael Grinham (France) Camille Serme (Hong Kong) Annie Au (New Zealand) Joelle King

=== Silver 30 ===
Tournament	Date	Champion	Runner-up	Semifinalists	Quarterfinalists
Greenwich Open 2011 (United States) New York City, United States; Silver 30 $37,450	20–23 January 2011	(Australia) Kasey Brown; 11-2, 11-7, 11-4	(New Zealand) Joelle King	(Republic of Ireland) Madeline Perry (United States) Amanda Sobhy	(Australia) Rachael Grinham (Netherlands) Natalie Grinham (Egypt) Raneem El Weleily (England) Sarah Kippax
Texas Open 2011 (United States) Dallas, United States; Silver 30 $40,000	14–17 April 2011	(Australia) Rachael Grinham; 11-5, 10-12, 12-10, 11-7	(Australia) Kasey Brown	(New Zealand) Joelle King (England) Sarah Kippax	(Malaysia) Low Wee Wern (Mexico) Samantha Terán (Hong Kong) Joey Chan (Netherlands) Natalie Grinham

=== Silver 20 ===
Tournament	Date	Champion	Runner-up	Semifinalists	Quarterfinalists
Atwater Cup 2011 (Canada) Montreal, Canada; Silver 20 $25,900	30 March - 2 April 2011	(Netherlands) Natalie Grinham; 11-6, 11-7, 14-12	(New Zealand) Joelle King	(Netherlands) Vanessa Atkinson (New Zealand) Jaclyn Hawkes	(Mexico) Samantha Terán (United States) Amanda Sobhy (France) Isabelle Stoehr (United States) Olivia Blatchford
Irish Squash Open 2011 (Republic of Ireland) Dublin, Ireland; Silver 20 $26,200	13–16 April 2011	(Egypt) Nour El Tayeb; 13-15, 5-11, 11-9, 12-10, 16-14	(New Zealand) Jaclyn Hawkes	(Republic of Ireland) Madeline Perry (Netherlands) Vanessa Atkinson	(Republic of Ireland) Aisling Blake (England) Dominique Lloyd-Walter (Italy) Manuela Manetta (South Africa) Tenille Swartz
Hurghada International 2011 (Egypt) Hurghada, Egypt; Silver 20 $20,000	14–19 May 2011	(Egypt) Raneem El Weleily; 11-5, 12-10, 11-9	(Egypt) Omneya Abdel Kawy	(Australia) Rachael Grinham (Egypt) Nour El Tayeb	(France) Camille Serme (Denmark) Line Hansen (Egypt) Engy Kheirallah (Egypt) Heba El Torky
Mexico Squash Open 2011; Boca del Río, Mexico; Silver 20 $20,000	23–26 June 2011	(Mexico) Samantha Terán; 7-11, 8-11, 11-7, 11-7, 11-5	(Netherlands) Natalie Grinham	(Hong Kong) Joey Chan (Republic of Ireland) Aisling Blake	(United States) Latasha Khan (United States) Olivia Blatchford (Netherlands) Milou van der Heijden (Brazil) Thaisa Serafini
World Tour Pyramides 2011 (France) Le Port-Marly, France; Silver 20 $26,700	30 June - 3 July 2011	(France) Camille Serme; 11-4, 11-4, 6-11, 11-9	(Netherlands) Natalie Grinham	(India) Dipika Pallikal (India) Joshna Chinappa	(Republic of Ireland) Aisling Blake (Denmark) Line Hansen (Czech Republic) Lucie Fialová (South Africa) Tenille Swartz
BC Honda Sun & Surf 2011 (Canada) Vancouver, Canada; Silver 20 $27,450	4–7 August 2011	(Mexico) Samantha Terán; 11-2, 11-5, 11-3	(New Zealand) Jaclyn Hawkes	(England) Emma Beddoes (United States) Latasha Khan	(Egypt) Heba El Torky (England) Victoria Lust (Egypt) Engy Kheirallah (Japan) Misaki Kobayashi
Atlantis Open 2011 (Egypt) Alexandria, Egypt; Silver 20 $20,000	25–28 September 2011	(Egypt) Nour El Sherbini; 11-5, 11-8, 7-11, 11-8	(New Zealand) Nour El Tayeb	(Denmark) Line Hansen (Egypt) Kanzy Emad El Defrawy	(Republic of Ireland) Aisling Blake (Egypt) Lauren Briggs (Egypt) Nouran El Torky (Egypt) Yathreb Adel
China Squash Open 2011; Shanghai, China; Silver 20 $25,300	11–14 October 2011	(Malaysia) Low Wee Wern; 13-15, 11-8, 11-4, 12-10	(Malaysia) Delia Arnold	(New Zealand) Jaclyn Hawkes (Egypt) Heba El Torky	(Hong Kong) Joey Chan (South Africa) Siyoli Waters (Japan) Misaki Kobayashi (Egypt) Nouran El Torky
Monte Carlo Classic 2011 (Monaco) Monte Carlo, Monaco; Silver 20 $20,000	11–14 October 2011	(Netherlands) Natalie Grinham; 7-11, 9-11, 12-10, 11-8, 11-8	(Hong Kong) Annie Au	(England) Sarah Kippax (Denmark) Line Hansen	(Republic of Ireland) Aisling Blake (Czech Republic) Lucie Fialová (England) Emily Whitlock (England) Lauren Briggs

== Year end world top 10 players ==
Rank	2011	
1	(Malaysia) Nicol David	3279.412
2	(England) Jenny Duncalf	1934.118
3	(England) Laura Massaro	1411.765
4	(Republic of Ireland) Madeline Perry	1409.200
5	(Australia) Kasey Brown	1111.667
6	(Australia) Rachael Grinham	1078.524
7	(Egypt) Raneem El Weleily	1022.789
8	(Hong Kong) Annie Au	948.952
9	(Netherlands) Natalie Grinham	920.889
10	(France) Camille Serme	877.175

== Retirements ==
Following is a list of notable players (winners of a main tour title, and/or part of the WSA World Rankings top 30 for at least one month) who announced their retirement from professional squash, became inactive, or were permanently banned from playing, during the 2011 season:

- (Netherlands) Vanessa Atkinson (born 10 March 1976 in Newcastle, England) joined the pro tour in 1995, reached the world no. 1 ranking in December 2005. Keeping the spot for four month in 2005. She won the World Open in 2004 against Natalie Grinham. She also has won major tournaments as the Qatar Classic, the Malaysian Open, the Tournament of Champions in New York and the US Open. She retired in August after win the Nottingham Open, the 24th WSA World Tour title of her career.
- Isabelle Stoehr (born 9 June 1979 in Tours, France) joined the pro tour in 1996, reached the singles no. 10 spot in February 2009. She won 7 WSA World Tour titles including the Alexandria Open and the WISPA des Pyramides. She retired in November after competing the Qatar Classic.
- Rebecca Chiu (born 24 November 1978 in Hong Kong) joined the pro tour in 1993, reached the singles no. 13 spot in October 2007. She won 16 WSA World Tour titles including Japan Open in 2001 and the Singapore Open in 2004. She retired in February 2011.
- Tenille Swartz (born 13 May 1987 in Parys, South Africa) joined the pro tour in 2006, reached the singles no. 28 spot in April 2008. She won 2 WSA World Tour titles. She retired in November after losing in the first round of the Qatar Classic.

== See also ==
- Official Women's Squash World Ranking
- Women's Squash Association
- WSA World Series 2011
- PSA World Tour 2011
