= Squash at the 2010 Commonwealth Games – Women's singles =

The squash at the 2010 Commonwealth Games was held at the Siri Fort Sports Complex, New Delhi. The singles play took place from 4 October.

Top seed Nicol David won the gold medal, defeating 2nd seed Jenny Duncalf 11–3, 11–5, 11–7 in 40 minutes. Nicol won all her 5 matches in three straight games en route to the gold.

== Medalists ==
Gold	Nicol David; Malaysia
Silver	Jenny Duncalf; England
Bronze	Kasey Brown; Australia

== Seeds ==
1. (Malaysia) Nicol David (champion)
2. (England) Jenny Duncalf (final)
3. (England) Alison Waters (semifinals)
4. (Northern Ireland) Madeline Perry (quarterfinals)
5. (England) Laura Massaro (quarterfinals)
6. (Australia) Kasey Brown (semifinals)
7. (New Zealand) Jaclyn Hawkes (quarterfinals)
8. (Australia) Donna Urquhart (third round)
9. (Malaysia) Low Wee Wern (third round)
10. (England) Sarah Kippax (third round)
11. (Malaysia) Delia Arnold (third round)
12. (New Zealand) Joelle King (quarterfinals)
13. (Australia) Lisa Camilleri (third round)
14. (India) Dipika Pallikal (withdrew due to fever, replaced by Surbhi Misra)
15. (India) Joshna Chinappa (third round)
16. (Canada) Alana Miller (third round)

== Draws and results ==
=== Finals ===
Quarter finals
1	(Malaysia) N David	11	11	11
5	(England) L Massaro	5	3	7
4	(Northern Ireland) M Perry	11	11	12	9	10
6	(Australia) K Brown	5	6	14	11	12
12	(New Zealand) J King	10	11	5	12	2
3	(England) A Waters	12	9	11	10	11
7	(New Zealand) J Hawkes	8	4	10
2	(England) J Duncalf	11	11	12

Semi finals
1	(Malaysia) N David	11	11	11
6	(Australia) K Brown	6	3	3
3	(England) A Waters	11	10	9	4
2	(England) J Duncalf	6	12	11	11

Final
1	(Malaysia) N David	11	11	11
2	(England) J Duncalf	3	5	7
Third place
6	(Australia) K Brown	w/o
3	(England) A Waters

=== Top half ===
==== Section 1 ====
First round

Second round
1	(Malaysia) N David	11	11	11
(Sri Lanka) D Udangawa	2	4	2
15	(India) J Chinappa	11	11	8	11
(Malaysia) S Wee	1	4	11	4
5	(England) L Massaro	11	11	11
(Scotland) L Aitken	4	2	5
16	(Canada) A Miller	11	11	11
(India) A Reddy	3	6	7

Third round
1	(Malaysia) N David	11	12	11
15	(India) J Chinappa	5	10	7
5	(England) L Massaro	11	11	11
16	(Canada) A Miller	7	4	3

Quarter finals
1	(Malaysia) N David	11	11	11
5	(England) L Massaro	5	3	7

==== Section 2 ====
First round
(Sri Lanka) S Guruge	11	11	11
(Kenya) S Madhani	3	9	2
(Scotland) F G-Buchert	11	11	11
(Guyana) A Khalil	2	3	6
(Canada) M Ranieri	11	11	13
(Jersey) K Cadigan	5	9	11
(Guernsey) I N-Ross	w/o
(Trinidad and Tobago) K Sample

Second round
4	(Northern Ireland) M Perry	11	11	11
(Sri Lanka) S Guruge	3	7	5
13	(Australia) L Camilleri	11	11	11
(Scotland) F G-Buchert	5	7	7
6	(Australia) K Brown	11	11	4
(Canada) M Ranieri	2	4	0	r
11	(Malaysia) D Arnold	11	11	11
(Guernsey) I N-Ross	5	4	5

Third round
4	(Northern Ireland) M Perry	11	11	11
13	(Australia) L Camilleri	4	4	5
6	(Australia) K Brown	11	8	11	11
11	(Malaysia) D Arnold	6	11	5	5

Quarter finals
4	(Northern Ireland) M Perry	11	11	12	9	10
6	(Australia) K Brown	5	6	14	11	12

=== Bottom half ===
==== Section 1 ====
First round
(Jersey) J Cowie	11	6	9	11	11
(Papua New Guinea) B Stubbings	5	11	11	4	6
(Guyana) N Fernandes	11	11	11
(Kenya) K Nimji	0	3	1
(Canada) S Edmison	11	11	11
(Guernsey) N Dodd	5	1	5

Second round
(Jersey) J Cowie	2	2	4
12	(New Zealand) J King	11	11	11
(Guyana) N Fernandes	10	9	7
8	(Australia) D Urquhart	12	11	11
(Canada) S Edmison	11	11	12
(India) S Misra	2	7	10
(Canada) S Cornett	2	4	5
3	(England) A Waters	11	11	11

Third round
12	(New Zealand) J King	11	9	11	11
8	(Australia) D Urquhart	6	11	8	4
(Canada) S Edmison	3	3	3
3	(England) A Waters	11	11	11

Quarter finals
12	(New Zealand) J King	10	11	5	12	2
3	(England) A Waters	12	9	11	10	11

==== Section 2 ====
First round

Second round
(Northern Ireland) Z Barr	4	3	3
9	(Malaysia) L W Wern	11	11	11
(Australia) A Pittock	5	9	7
7	(New Zealand) J Hawkes	11	11	11
(India) A Alankamony	7	4	3
10	(England) S Kippax	11	11	11
(Guernsey) S Curgenven	4	3	1
2	(England) J Duncalf	11	11	11

Third round
9	(Malaysia) L W Wern	7	6	11	4
7	(New Zealand) J Hawkes	11	11	5	11
10	(England) S Kippax	11	3	6	2
2	(England) J Duncalf	4	11	11	11

Quarter finals
7	(New Zealand) J Hawkes	8	4	10
2	(England) J Duncalf	11	11	12
