= Women's Hong Kong squash Open 2011 =

Cathay Pacific Hong Kong Open 2011
- 10th WSA Hong Kong Open

Details
- Event name: Cathay Pacific Sun Hung Kai Financial Hong Kong Open 2011
- Location: Hong Kong
- Venue: Hong Kong Squash Centre
- Website www.hksquash.org.hk/hkopen2011/

Women's Winner
- Category: World Series Gold
- Prize money: $74,000
- Year: World Tour 2011

The Women's Hong Kong squash Open 2011 is the women's edition of the 2011 Hong Kong Open, which is a WSA World Series event Gold (prize money: $74 000). The event took place at the Hong Kong Squash Centre in Hong Kong from 15–20 November. Nicol David won her sixth Hong Kong Open trophy, beating Raneem El Weleily in the final.

== Prize money and ranking points ==
For 2011, the prize purse was $74,000. The prize money and points breakdown is as follows:

Prize money Hong Kong Open (2011)
Event	W	F	SF	QF	2R	1R
Points (WSA)	3360	2310	1365	735	365.5	210
Prize money	$10,880	$7,360	$4,320	$2,560	$1,440	$800

== Seeds ==
1. (Malaysia) Nicol David (champion)
2. (England) Jenny Duncalf (second round)
3. (Australia) Rachael Grinham (quarterfinals)
4. (Republic of Ireland) Madeline Perry (second round)
5. (England) Laura Massaro (quarterfinals)
6. (Australia) Kasey Brown (second round)
7. (France) Camille Serme (quarterfinals)
8. (Hong Kong) Annie Au (semifinals)
9. (New Zealand) Joelle King (second round)
10. (Egypt) Raneem El Weleily (final)
11. (Australia) Donna Urquhart (second round)
12. (New Zealand) Jaclyn Hawkes (second round)
13. (Malaysia) Low Wee Wern (semifinals)
14. (England) Sarah Kippax (first round)
15. (Hong Kong) Joey Chan (quarterfinals)
16. (Malaysia) Delia Arnold (second round)

== Draw and results ==
First round
1	(Malaysia) Nicol David	11	11	11
Q	(Hong Kong) Tong Tsz-Wing	9	4	2
11	(Australia) Donna Urquhart	11	4	11	11
(Denmark) Line Hansen	4	11	6	7
5	(England) Laura Massaro	11	11	11
Q	(Czech Republic) Olga Ertlová	3	4	7
16	(Malaysia) Delia Arnold	11	12	12
Q	(France) Coline Aumard	2	10	10
3	(Australia) Rachael Grinham	11
(United States) Latasha Khan	4
12	(New Zealand) Jaclyn Hawkes	11	12	11
Q	(England) Tania Bailey	3	10	8
8	(Hong Kong) Annie Au	11	11	11
(Switzerland) Gaby Huber	3	6	8
9	(New Zealand) Joelle King	11	11	10	12
Q	(Japan) Misaki Kobayashi	8	6	12	10
(Republic of Ireland) Aisling Blake	6	8	6
15	(Hong Kong) Joey Chan	11	11	11
(Australia) Melody Francis	5	6	7
6	(Australia) Kasey Brown	11	11	11
Q	(Germany) Sina Wall	6	4	3
10	(Egypt) Raneem El Weleily	11	11	11
(India) Dipika Pallikal	11	10	8	11	7
4	(Republic of Ireland) Madeline Perry	5	11	11	5	11
(England) Emma Beddoes	11	11	2	11
14	(England) Sarah Kippax	6	6	11	5
WC	(Hong Kong) Liu Tsz Ling	3	3	1
7	(France) Camille Serme	11	11	11
Q	(New Zealand) Kylie Lindsay	11	11	11
13	(Malaysia) Low Wee Wern	11	11	11
Q	(Hong Kong) Lee Ka Yi	4	9	11	9
2	(England) Jenny Duncalf	11	11	8	11

Second round
1	(Malaysia) Nicol David	11	11	14
11	(Australia) Donna Urquhart	6	7	12
5	(England) Laura Massaro	11	11	11
16	(Malaysia) Delia Arnold	5	7	5
3	(Australia) Rachael Grinham	11	4	8	11	11
12	(New Zealand) Jaclyn Hawkes	5	11	11	2	8
8	(Hong Kong) Annie Au	12	2	11	11
9	(New Zealand) Joelle King	10	11	9	6
15	(Hong Kong) Joey Chan	11	11	11
6	(Australia) Kasey Brown	8	5	8
10	(Egypt) Raneem El Weleily	11	11	11
4	(Republic of Ireland) Madeline Perry	7	7	8
(England) Emma Beddoes	9	3	7
7	(France) Camille Serme	11	11	11
13	(Malaysia) Low Wee Wern	11	11	11
2	(England) Jenny Duncalf	7	7	1

Quarter finals
1	(Malaysia) Nicol David	11	11	6	11
5	(England) Laura Massaro	5	8	11	6
3	(Australia) Rachael Grinham	11	9	11	6	4
8	(Hong Kong) Annie Au	8	11	4	11	11
15	(Hong Kong) Joey Chan	7	3	11	11	8
10	(Egypt) Raneem El Weleily	11	11	7	9	11
7	(France) Camille Serme	7	11	9	11	4
13	(Malaysia) Low Wee Wern	11	9	11	5	11

Semi finals
1	(Malaysia) Nicol David	9	11	11	11
8	(Hong Kong) Annie Au	11	2	4	6
Final
1	(Malaysia) Nicol David	11	11	11
10	(Egypt) Raneem El Weleily	5	4	9
10	(Egypt) Raneem El Weleily	11	9	11	11
13	(Malaysia) Low Wee Wern	6	11	3	9

== See also ==
- Hong Kong Open (squash)
- Men's Hong Kong squash Open 2011
- WSA World Series 2011

Preceded by World Open; Netherlands (Rotterdam); 2011	WSA World Series 2011; Hong Kong Open; Hong Kong; 2011	Succeeded by Kuala Lumpur Open; Malaysia (Kuala Lumpur) 2012
