= 2011 Women's Australian Open (squash) =

Australian Open 2011
- 32nd WSA Australian Open

Details
- Event name: Australian Open 2011
- Location: Canberra Australia
- Venue: National Convention Centre
- Website www.australiansquashopen.com

Women's Winner
- Category: World Series Gold
- Prize money: $74,000
- Year: World Tour 2011

The Women's Australian Open 2011 is the women' edition of the 2011 Australian Open, which is a tournament of the WSA World Series event Gold (Prize money : 74 000 $). The event took place in Canberra in Australia from 9 to 14 August. Nicol David won her first Australian Open trophy, beating Jenny Duncalf in the final.

== Prize money and ranking points ==
For 2011, the prize purse was $74,000. The prize money and points breakdown is as follows:

Prize Money Australian Open (2011)
Event	W	F	SF	QF	2R	1R
Points (WSA)	3360	2310	1365	735	365.5	210
Prize money	$10,880	$7,360	$4,320	$2,560	$1,440	$800

== Seeds ==
1. (Malaysia) Nicol David (champion)
2. (England) Jenny Duncalf (final)
3. (Australia) Rachael Grinham (semifinals)
4. (Republic of Ireland) Madeline Perry (semifinals)
5. (Australia) Kasey Brown (second round)
6. (Hong Kong) Annie Au (quarterfinals)
7. (Australia) Donna Urquhart (quarterfinals)
8. (New Zealand) Joelle King (quarterfinals)
9. (Malaysia) Low Wee Wern (second round)
10. (Netherlands) Natalie Grinham (quarterfinals)
11. (Hong Kong) Joey Chan (second round)
12. (Malaysia) Delia Arnold (second round)
13. (India) Dipika Pallikal (second round)
14. (Denmark) Line Hansen (second round)
15. (New Zealand) Kylie Lindsay (first round)
16. (Switzerland) Gaby Huber (second round)

== Draw and results ==
First round
1	(Malaysia) Nicol David	11	11	11
(Australia) Samantha Davies	3	6	2
15	(New Zealand) Kylie Lindsay	9	11	4	3
(England) Emily Whitlock	11	7	11	11
6	(Hong Kong) Annie Au	11	11	11
Q	(Scotland) Lisa Aitken	3	1	5
14	(Denmark) Line Hansen	8	11	11	11
(Netherlands) M. van der Heijden	11	9	8	9
3	(Australia) Rachael Grinham	11	11	11
(Czech Republic) Lucie Fialová	7	5	2
9	(Malaysia) Low Wee Wern	11	11	11
Q	(Australia) Zoe Petrovansky	4	6	5
7	(Australia) Donna Urquhart	11	11	11
Q	(Australia) Tamika Saxby	7	1	3
13	(India) Dipika Pallikal	11	11	11
Q	(New Zealand) A. Landers-Murphy	4	8	2
(Czech Republic) Olga Ertlová	11	9	11	6	6
12	(Malaysia) Delia Arnold	5	11	9	11	11
(Australia) Maggy Marshall	6	3	2
8	(New Zealand) Joelle King	11	11	11
WC	(Australia) Christine Nunn	3	2	3
11	(Hong Kong) Joey Chan	11	11	11
(Malaysia) Siti Munirah Jusoh	5	2	3
4	(Republic of Ireland) Madeline Perry	11	11	11
(Australia) Melody Francis	2	4	5
10	(Netherlands) Natalie Grinham	11	11	11
Q	(New Zealand) Amanda Cranston	2	7	3
5	(Australia) Kasey Brown	11	11	11
(Australia) Sarah Cardwell	6	11	5	1
16	(Switzerland) Gaby Huber	11	8	11	11
Q	(Australia) Vanessa Pickerd	5	3	3
2	(England) Jenny Duncalf	11	11	11

Second round
1	(Malaysia) Nicol David	11	11	11
(England) Emily Whitlock	9	7	5
6	(Hong Kong) Annie Au	14	11	9	11
14	(Denmark) Line Hansen	12	4	11	9
3	(Australia) Rachael Grinham	11	8	11	11
9	(Malaysia) Low Wee Wern	8	11	4	3
7	(Australia) Donna Urquhart	11	7	11	11
13	(India) Dipika Pallikal	6	11	6	8
12	(Malaysia) Delia Arnold	5	11	9
8	(New Zealand) Joelle King	11	13	11
11	(Hong Kong) Joey Chan	8	11	3	2
4	(Republic of Ireland) Madeline Perry	11	6	11	11
10	(Netherlands) Natalie Grinham	11	7	12	11
5	(Australia) Kasey Brown	9	11	10	9
16	(Switzerland) Gaby Huber	5	3	1
2	(England) Jenny Duncalf	11	11	11

Quarter finals
1	(Malaysia) Nicol David	11	11	11
6	(Hong Kong) Annie Au	0	2	0
3	(Australia) Rachael Grinham	11	11	11
7	(Australia) Donna Urquhart	7	4	7
(New Zealand) Joelle King	11	11	10	9
(Republic of Ireland) Madeline Perry	13	2	12	11
10	(Netherlands) Natalie Grinham	4	10	11	8
2	(England) Jenny Duncalf	11	12	8	11

Semi finals
1	(Malaysia) Nicol David	11	13	11
3	(Australia) Rachael Grinham	7	11	7
Final
1	(Malaysia) Nicol David	11	11	11
2	(England) Jenny Duncalf	8	4	6
4	(Republic of Ireland) Madeline Perry	8	9	11	4
2	(England) Jenny Duncalf	11	11	2	11

== See also ==
- WSA World Tour 2011
- Australian Open (squash)
- 2011 Men's Australian Open (squash)

Preceded by Malaysian Open; Malaysia (Kuala Lumpur); 2011	WSA World Series 2011; Australian Open; Australia (Canberra); 2011	Succeeded by US Open; United States (Philadelphia) 2011
