= Squash at the 2014 Commonwealth Games – Women's doubles =

Women's doubles Squash 2014 Commonwealth Games
- 5th Women's doubles squash at the Commonwealth Games
- Location: Glasgow, Scotland
- Venue: Scotstoun Sports Campus
- Date(s): 29 July – 2 August 2014
- Website cwgsquash.net
- Category: XX Commonwealth Games

The Women's doubles event at the 2014 Commonwealth Games was held at the Scotstoun Sports Campus, Glasgow from 29 July to 2 August.

Dipika Pallikal and Joshna Chinappa of India defeated Laura Massaro and Jenny Duncalf of England 11–6, 11–8 to win the gold medal.

== Medalists ==
Gold	Dipika Pallikal; India; Joshna Chinappa; India
Silver	Laura Massaro; England; Jenny Duncalf; England
Bronze	Alison Waters; England; Emma Beddoes; England

== Seeds ==
1. Laura Massaro (ENG) Jenny Duncalf (ENG) (Final)
2. Rachael Grinham (AUS) Kasey Brown (AUS) (Semifinals)
3. Alison Waters (ENG) Emma Beddoes (ENG) (Semifinals)
4. Nicol David (MAS) Low Wee Wern (MAS) (Quarterfinals)
5. Dipika Pallikal (IND) Joshna Chinappa (IND) (Champion)
6. Joelle King (NZL) Amanda Landers-Murphy (NZL) (Quarterfinals)
7. Donna Urquhart (AUS) Lisa Camilleri (AUS) (Quarterfinals)
8. Tesni Evans (WAL) Deon Saffery (WAL) (Quarterfinals)

== Finals ==
Quarterfinals
1	Laura Massaro (ENG); Jenny Duncalf (ENG)	11	11
7	Donna Urquhart (AUS); Lisa Camilleri (AUS)	7	4
4	Nicol David (MAS); Low Wee Wern (MAS)	10	8
3	Alison Waters (ENG); Emma Beddoes (ENG)	11	11
5	Dipika Pallikal (IND); Joshna Chinappa (IND)	11	11
6	Joelle King (NZL); Amanda Land.-Murphy (NZL)	9	5
8	Tesni Evans (WAL); Deon Saffery (WAL)	10	6
2	Rachael Grinham (AUS); Kasey Brown (AUS)	11	11

Semifinals
1	Laura Massaro (ENG); Jenny Duncalf (ENG)	11	11
3	Alison Waters (ENG); Emma Beddoes (ENG)	7	8
5	Dipika Pallikal (IND); Joshna Chinappa (IND)	11	7	11
2	Rachael Grinham (AUS); Kasey Brown (AUS)	9	11	4

Gold Medal Match
1	Laura Massaro (ENG); Jenny Duncalf (ENG)	6	8
5	Dipika Pallikal (IND); Joshna Chinappa (IND)	11	11
Bronze Medal Match
3	Alison Waters (ENG); Emma Beddoes (ENG)	11	11
2	Rachael Grinham (AUS); Kasey Brown (AUS)	3	5

== Group stage ==
=== Pool A ===
Team	MP	MW	ML	MPO	GW	GL	GD	PW	PL	PD
Jenny Duncalf (ENG); Laura Massaro (ENG)	3	3	0	3	6	0	6	66	32	+34
Tesni Evans (WAL); Deon Saffery (WAL)	3	2	1	2	4	2	2	61	42	+19
Lynette Vai (PNG); Eli Webb (PNG)	3	1	2	1	2	5	-3	46	71	-25
Charlotte Knaggs (TTO); Kerry Sample (TTO)	3	0	3	0	1	6	-5	48	76	-28

29 July 18:30
Team	1	2	3	Match
Jenny Duncalf (ENG); Laura Massaro (ENG)	11	11		2
Eli Webb (PNG); Lynette Vai (PNG)	4	5		0
Report

29 July 18:30
Team	1	2	3	Match
Tesni Evans (WAL); Deon Saffery (WAL)	11	11		2
Charlotte Knaggs (TTO); Kerry Sample (TTO)	6	9		0
Report

30 July 11:30
Team	1	2	3	Match
Jenny Duncalf (ENG); Laura Massaro (ENG)	11	11		2
Tesni Evans (WAL); Deon Saffery (WAL)	10	7		0
Report

30 July 12:00
Team	1	2	3	Match
Eli Webb (PNG); Lynette Vai (PNG)	11	10	11	2
Charlotte Knaggs (TTO); Kelly Sample (TTO)	6	11	10	1
Report

30 July 19:00
Team	1	2	3	Match
Jenny Duncalf (ENG); Laura Massaro (ENG)	11	11		2
Charlotte Knaggs (TTO); Kelly Sample (TTO)	2	4		0
Report

30 July 19:00
Team	1	2	3	Match
Tesni Evans (WAL); Deon Saffery (WAL)	11	11		2
Eli Webb (PNG); Lynette Vai (PNG)	2	3		0
Report

=== Pool B ===
Team	MP	MW	ML	MPO	GW	GL	GD	PW	PL	PD
Kasey Brown (AUS); Rachael Grinham (AUS)	3	3	0	3	6	0	6	66	32	+34
Lisa Camilleri (AUS); Donna Urquhart (AUS)	3	2	1	2	4	2	2	59	39	+20
Rachel Arnold (MAS); Vanessa Raj (MAS)	3	1	2	1	2	4	-2	44	58	-14
Kimberly Borg-Cauchi (MLT); Collette Sultana (MLT)	3	0	3	0	0	6	-6	26	66	-40

29 July 19:00
Team	1	2	3	Match
Kasey Brown (AUS); Rachael Grinham (AUS)	11	11		2
Vanessa Raj (MAS); Rachel Arnold (MAS)	5	7		0
Report

29 July 19:00
Team	1	2	3	Match
Lisa Camilleri (AUS); Donna Urquhart (AUS)	11	11		2
Kimberly Borg-Cauchi (MLT); Collette Sultana (MLT)	3	4		0
Report

30 July 11:30
Team	1	2	3	Match
Kasey Brown (AUS); Rachael Grinham (AUS)	11	11		2
Lisa Camilleri (AUS); Donna Urquhart (AUS)	9	6		0
Report

30 July 11:30
Team	1	2	3	Match
Vanessa Raj (MAS); Rachel Arnold (MAS)	11	11		2
Kimberly Borg-Cauchi (MLT); Collette Sultana (MLT)	7	7		0
Report

30 July 18:30
Team	1	2	3	Match
Lisa Camilleri (AUS); Donna Urquhart (AUS)	11	11		2
Vanessa Raj (MAS); Rachel Arnold (MAS)	4	6		0
Report

30 July 19:00
Team	1	2	3	Match
Kasey Brown (AUS); Rachael Grinham (AUS)	11	11		2
Kimberly Borg-Cauchi (MLT); Collette Sultana (MLT)	1	4		0
Report

=== Pool C ===
Team	MP	MW	ML	MPO	GW	GL	GD	PW	PL	PD
Emma Beddoes (ENG); Alice Waters (ENG)	3	3	0	3	6	1	5	74	48	+26
Joelle King (NZL); Amanda Landers-Murphy (NZL)	3	2	1	2	5	2	3	65	44	+21
Alex Clark (SCO); Frania Gillen-Buchert (SCO)	3	1	2	1	2	4	-2	48	49	-1
Dorothy Boyce (PNG); Sheila Morove (PNG)	3	0	3	0	0	6	-6	20	66	-46

29 July 19:00
Team	1	2	3	Match
Joelle King (NZL); Amanda Landers-Murphy (NZL)	11	11		2
Sheila Morove (PNG); Dorothy Boyce (PNG)	3	3		0
Report

29 July 19:30
Team	1	2	3	Match
Alice Waters (ENG); Emma Beddoes (ENG)	11	11		2
Alex Clark (SCO); Frania Gillen-Buchert (SCO)	8	10		0
Report

30 July 11:30
Team	1	2	3	Match
Alex Clark (SCO); Frania Gillen-Buchert (SCO)	11	11		2
Sheila Morove (PNG); Dorothy Boyce (PNG)	3	2		0
Report

30 July 12:00
Team	1	2	3	Match
Alice Waters (ENG); Emma Beddoes (ENG)	8	11	11	2
Joelle King (NZL); Amanda Landers-Murphy (NZL)	11	2	8	1
Report

30 July 19:30
Team	1	2	3	Match
Alice Waters (ENG); Emma Beddoes (ENG)	11	11		2
Sheila Morove (PNG); Dorothy Boyce (PNG)	2	7		0
Report

30 July 20:00
Team	1	2	3	Match
Joelle King (NZL); Amanda Landers-Murphy (NZL)	11	11		2
Alex Clark (SCO); Frania Gillen-Buchert (SCO)	6	2		0
Report

=== Pool D ===
Team	MP	MW	ML	MPO	GW	GL	GD	PW	PL	PD
Joshana Chinappa (IND); Dipika Pallikal (IND)	3	3	0	3	6	0	6	66	29	+37
Nicol David (MAS); Low Wee Wern (MAS)	3	2	1	2	4	3	1	64	53	+11
Megan Craig (NZL); Kylie Lindsay (NZL)	3	1	2	1	3	4	-1	58	56	+2
Mihilia Methsarani (SRI); Nadindi Udangawa (SRI)	3	0	3	0	0	6	-6	16	66	-50

29 July 19:00
Team	1	2	3	Match
Nicol David (MAS); Low Wee Wern (MAS)	7	11	11	2
Megan Craig (NZL); Kylie Lindsay (NZL)	11	10	6	1
Report

29 July 19:30
Team	1	2	3	Match
Dipika Pallikal (IND); Joshana Chinappa (IND)	11	11		2
Mihilia Methsarani (SRI); Nadindi Udangawa (SRI)	3	4		0
Report

30 July 12:00
Team	1	2	3	Match
Nicol David (MAS); Low Wee Wern (MAS)	8	5		0
Dipika Pallikal (IND); Joshana Chinappa (IND)	11	11		2
Report

30 July 12:00
Team	1	2	3	Match
Megan Craig (NZL); Kylie Lindsay (NZL)	11	11		2
Mihilia Methsarani (SRI); Nadindi Udangawa (SRI)	4	1		0
Report

30 July 18:30
Team	1	2	3	Match
Dipika Pallikal (IND); Joshana Chinappa (IND)	11	11		2
Megan Craig (NZL); Kylie Lindsay (NZL)	5	4		0
Report

30 July 19:00
Team	1	2	3	Match
Nicol David (MAS); Low Wee Wern (MAS)	11	11		2
Mihilia Methsarani (SRI); Nadindi Udangawa (SRI)	2	2		0
Report
