= Cayman Islands Open 2011 =

Women's squash tournament in the Cayman Islands

- 3rd Cayman Islands Open

Details
- Event name: Cedrus Investments Cayman Islands Open 2011
- Location: Grand Cayman, Cayman Islands
- Website www.squashsite.co.uk/cayman/

Women's Winner
- Category: World Series Gold
- Prize money: $68,500
- Year: World Tour 2011

The Cayman Islands Open 2011 is the women's edition of the 2011 Cayman Islands Open, which is a tournament of the WSA World Series event Gold (Prize money: $68,500). The event took place in Grand Cayman in the Cayman Islands from 3 to 9 April. Nicol David won her third Cayman Islands Open trophy, beating Jenny Duncalf in the final.

== Prize money and ranking points ==
For 2011, the prize purse was $68,500. The prize money and points breakdown is as follows:

Prize Money Cayman Islands Open (2011)
Event	W	F	SF	QF	1R
Points (WSA)	3360	2310	1365	735	365,5
Prize money	$11,115	$7,605	$4,975	$3,070	$1,755

== Seeds ==
1. (Malaysia) Nicol David (champion)
2. (England) Jenny Duncalf (final)
3. (Australia) Rachael Grinham (semifinals)
4. (England) Alison Waters (first round)
5. (Republic of Ireland) Madeline Perry (quarterfinals)
6. (Australia) Kasey Brown (first round)
7. (France) Camille Serme (quarterfinals)
8. (Hong Kong) Annie Au (first round)

== Draw and results ==
First round
1	(Malaysia) Nicol David	11	11	11
(New Zealand) Jaclyn Hawkes	7	6	3
6	(Australia) Kasey Brown	6	11	12
Q	(Netherlands) Natalie Grinham	11	13	14
4	(England) Alison Waters	5	9	11	12	7
Q	(Australia) Donna Urquhart	11	11	9	10	11
5	(Republic of Ireland) Madeline Perry	6	18	3	11	11
Q	(United States) Amanda Sobhy	11	16	11	9	8
Q	(England) Sarah Kippax	11	11	9	11
8	(Hong Kong) Annie Au	4	6	11	8
WC	(Cayman Islands) Marlene West	5	4	3
3	(Australia) Rachael Grinham	11	11	11
(Malaysia) Low Wee Wern	8	6	11	2
7	(France) Camille Serme	11	11	8	11
(New Zealand) Joelle King	7	11	3	11	3
2	(England) Jenny Duncalf	11	2	11	9	11

Quarter finals
1	(Malaysia) Nicol David	11	8	11	11
Q	(Netherlands) Natalie Grinham	4	11	8	4
Q	(Australia) Donna Urquhart	6	11	11	12	11
5	(Republic of Ireland) Madeline Perry	11	13	8	10	9
Q	(England) Sarah Kippax	7	6	7
3	(Australia) Rachael Grinham	11	11	11
7	(France) Camille Serme	11	6	4	7
2	(England) Jenny Duncalf	6	11	11	11

Semi finals
1	(Malaysia) Nicol David	11	11	11
Q	(Australia) Donna Urquhart	6	8	5
3	(Australia) Rachael Grinham	13	12	11	7	10
2	(England) Jenny Duncalf	15	10	4	11	12

Final
1	(Malaysia) Nicol David	11	11	12	11
2	(England) Jenny Duncalf	7	6	14	4

== See also ==
- WSA World Series 2011
- Cayman Islands Open

Preceded by Qatar Classic; Qatar (Doha); 2010	WSA World Series 2011; Cayman Islands Open; Cayman Islands (Grand Cayman); 2011	Succeeded by Malaysian Open; Malaysia (Kuala Lumpur) 2011
