= 2011 WSA World Series =

WSA World Series 2011

Details
- Event name: WSA World Series 2011
- Website wsaworldtour.com/site/players/world-series-standings
- Year: World Tour 2011

The WSA World Series 2011 is a series of women's squash tournaments which are part of the Women's Squash Association (WSA) World Tour for the 2011 squash season. The WSA World Series tournaments are some of the most prestigious events on the women's tour. The best-performing players in the World Series events qualify for the annual 2011 WSA World Series Finals tournament. Nicol David won her first WSA World Series Squash Finals trophy, beating Madeline Perry in the final.

== WSA World Series Ranking Points ==
WSA World Series events also have a separate World Series ranking. Points for this are calculated on a cumulative basis after each World Series event.

Tournament			Ranking Points
Rank	Prize Money US$	Ranking Points	Winner	Runner up	3/4	5/8	9/16	17/32
World Series	$60,000+	625 points	100	65	40	25	15	10

== 2011 Tournaments ==
Tournament	Country	Location	Rank	Prize money	Date	2011 Winner
Cayman Islands Open 2011	Cayman Islands	Cayman Islands	World Series Gold	$68,500	4–9 April 2011	(Malaysia) Nicol David
Malaysian Open 2011	Malaysia	Kuala Lumpur	World Series Gold	$68,500	19–23 July 2011	(Malaysia) Nicol David
Australian Open 2011	Australia	Canberra	World Series Gold	$74,000	8–14 August 2011	(Malaysia) Nicol David
US Open 2011	United States	Philadelphia	World Series Gold	$60,000	1–6 October 2011	(England) Laura Massaro
Qatar Classic 2011	Qatar	Doha	World Series Gold	$74,000	16–21 October 2011	(Malaysia) Nicol David
World Open 2011	Netherlands	Rotterdam	World Open	$143,000	1–6 November 2011	(Malaysia) Nicol David
Hong Kong Open 2011	Hong Kong	Hong Kong	World Series Gold	$74,000	14–20 November 2011	(Malaysia) Nicol David

== World Series Standings 2011 ==
Performance Table Legend
10	1st Round	15	Round of 16
25	Quarterfinalist	40	Semifinalist
65	Runner-up	**100**	Winner

**Top 16 World Series Standings 2011**
Rank	Player	Number of Tournament	Cayman Islands Open	Malaysian Open	Australian Open	US Open	Qatar Classic	World Open	Hong Kong Open	Total Points
Rank	Player	Number of Tournament	CAY (Cayman Islands)	MAS (Malaysia)	AUS (Australia)	USA (United States)	QAT (Qatar)	NED (Netherlands)	HKG (Hong Kong)	Total Points
1	(Malaysia) **Nicol David**	7	**100**	**100**	**100**	25	**100**	**100**	**100**	**625**
2	(England) **Jenny Duncalf**	7	65	65	65	40	15	65	15	**330**
3	(Republic of Ireland) **Madeline Perry**	7	25	15	40	40	65	15	15	**215**
4	(Australia) **Rachael Grinham**	7	40	25	40	25	40	15	25	**210**
5	(England) **Laura Massaro**	5	-	25	-	**100**	15	25	25	**190**
6	(Australia) Kasey Brown	6	15	25	15	65	10	25	15	**170**
7	(Malaysia) **Low Wee Wern**	7	15	15	15	10	25	25	40	**145**
8	(France) **Camille Serme**	6	25	40	-	25	15	15	25	**145**
9	(Australia) **Donna Urquhart**	7	40	15	25	15	15	10	15	**135**
10	(Hong Kong) Annie Au	6	15	15	25	25	-	15	40	**135**
11	(Egypt) Raneem El Weleily	5	-	15	-	15	25	15	65	**135**
12	(New Zealand) Joelle King	6	15	25	25	15	-	15	15	**110**
13	(Netherlands) Natalie Grinham	3	25	-	25	-	-	40	-	**90**
14	(Hong Kong) Joey Chan	6	-	10	15	10	15	10	25	**85**
15	(Malaysia) Delia Arnold	6	-	15	15	15	10	10	15	**80**
16	(India) Dipika Pallikal	5	-	15	15	15	-	25	10	**80**

Bold – The first eight players present for the final

Final tournament	Country	Location	Prize money	Date	2011 World Series Champion
WSA World Series Finals 2011	England	Queen's Club, London	$50,000	4–8 January 2012	(Malaysia) **Nicol David**

== See also ==
- WSA World Tour 2011
- WSA World Series
- Official Women's Squash World Ranking
