= Women's Qatar Classic 2011 =

Qatar Classic
- 11th WSA Qatar Classic

Details
- Event name: Qatar Classic Squash Championship
- Location: Doha, Qatar
- Venue: Aspire Academy
- Website www.squashsite.co.uk/qatar/

Women's Winner
- Category: World Series Gold
- Prize money: $74,000
- Year: World Tour 2011

The Women's Qatar Classic 2011 is the women's edition of the 2011 Qatar Classic, a squash tournament which is a WSA World Series gold event ($74,000 prize money). The event took place in Doha from 16 October to 21 October. Nicol David won her fourth Qatar Classic trophy, beating Madeline Perry in the final.

== Prize money and ranking points ==
For 2011, the prize purse was $74,000. The prize money and points breakdown is as follows:

Prize money Qatar Classic (2011)
Event	W	F	SF	QF	2R	1R
Points (WSA)	3360	2310	1365	735	365.5	210
Prize money	$10,880	$7,360	$4,320	$2,560	$1,440	$800

== Seeds ==
1. (Malaysia) Nicol David (champion)
2. (England) Jenny Duncalf (second round)
3. (Australia) Rachael Grinham (semifinals)
4. (Republic of Ireland) Madeline Perry (final)
5. (England) Laura Massaro (second round)
6. (Australia) Kasey Brown (first round)
7. (France) Camille Serme (second round)
8. (Egypt) Omneya Abdel Kawy (first round)
9. (Egypt) Raneem El Weleily (quarterfinals)
10. (Australia) Donna Urquhart (second round)
11. (New Zealand) Jaclyn Hawkes (first round)
12. (Malaysia) Low Wee Wern (quarterfinals)
13. (Egypt) Nour El Tayeb (semifinals)
14. (England) Sarah Kippax (first round)
15. (Hong Kong) Joey Chan (second round)
16. (Malaysia) Delia Arnold (first round)

== Draw and results ==
First round
1	(Malaysia) Nicol David	11	11	11
(Denmark) Line Hansen	4	4	4
16	(Malaysia) Delia Arnold	8	11	11	6	8
(Egypt) Kanzy El Defrawy	11	4	6	11	11
7	(France) Camille Serme	11	11	11
Q	(South Africa) Tenille Swartz	3	8	5
9	(Egypt) Raneem El Weleily	11	11	8	10	11
Q	(England) Tania Bailey	4	6	11	12	3
3	(Australia) Rachael Grinham	11	11	11
Q	(Egypt) Yathreb Adel	8	5	2
14	(England) Sarah Kippax	1	9	3
(Republic of Ireland) Aisling Blake	11	11	11
8	(Egypt) Omneya Abdel Kawy	11	3	7	11
(England) Emma Beddoes	6	11	11	13
15	(Hong Kong) Joey Chan	6
(Egypt) Heba El Torky	0
Q	(England) Emily Whitlock	3	9	5
12	(Malaysia) Low Wee Wern	11	11	11
Q	(Egypt) Merhan Mahmoud	4	3	5
5	(England) Laura Massaro	11	11	11
Q	(Egypt) Farah Abdel Meguid	11	5	11	11
11	(New Zealand) Jaclyn Hawkes	3	11	8	7
Q	(Malaysia) Siti Munirah Jusoh	6	4	2
4	(Republic of Ireland) Madeline Perry	11	11	11
(England) Victoria Lust	3	14	11	6	8
10	(Australia) Donna Urquhart	11	12	6	11	11
(Egypt) Nour El Sherbini	11	7	11
6	(Australia) Kasey Brown	9	11	5
(Switzerland) Gaby Huber	1	12	8
13	(Egypt) Nour El Tayeb	11	14	11
Q	(Germany) Sina Wall	6	3	6
2	(England) Jenny Duncalf	11	11	11

Second round
1	(Malaysia) Nicol David	11	11	11
(Egypt) Kanzy El Defrawy	6	7	1
7	(France) Camille Serme	7	5	5
9	(Egypt) Raneem El Weleily	11	11	11
3	(Australia) Rachael Grinham	7	11	11	11
(Republic of Ireland) Aisling Blake	11	5	7	5
(England) Emma Beddoes	8	11	11	6	13
15	(Hong Kong) Joey Chan	11	6	7	11	11
13	(Malaysia) Low Wee Wern	11	3	12	11
5	(England) Laura Massaro	6	11	10	9
Q	(Egypt) Farah Abdel Meguid	5	5	3
4	(Republic of Ireland) Madeline Perry	11	11	11
10	(Australia) Donna Urquhart	8	7	5
(Egypt) Nour El Sherbini	11	11	11
13	(Egypt) Nour El Tayeb	11	5	11	12
2	(England) Jenny Duncalf	8	11	9	10

Quarter finals *
1	(Malaysia) Nicol David	11	11	11
(Egypt) Raneem El Weleily	6	4	8
3	(Australia) Rachael Grinham	14	11	11
(England) Emma Beddoes	12	4	7
12	(Malaysia) Low Wee Wern	8	5	9
4	(Republic of Ireland) Madeline Perry	11	11	11
(Egypt) Nour El Sherbini	8	11	8	11
13	(Egypt) Nour El Tayeb	11	5	11	13

Semi finals *
1	(Malaysia) Nicol David	11	4	11	11
3	(Australia) Rachael Grinham	6	11	6	8
Final
1	(Malaysia) Nicol David *	11	11	11
4	(Republic of Ireland) Madeline Perry	2	7	3
4	(Republic of Ireland) Madeline Perry	11	19	11
13	(Egypt) Nour El Tayeb	9	17	9

== See also ==
- Qatar Classic
- 2011 Women's World Open Squash Championship
- WSA World Series 2011

Preceded by US Open; United States (Philadelphia); 2011	WSA World Series 2011; Qatar Classic; Qatar (Doha); 2011	Succeeded by World Open; Netherlands (Rotterdam); 2011
