= Women's United States Open (squash) 2011 =

US Open 2011
- 12th WSA U.S. Open

Details
- Event name: Delaware Investments United States Open 2011
- Location: (United States) Philadelphia, Pennsylvania
- Venue: Daskalakis Athletic Center
- Website www.usopensquash.com/philadelphia/

Women's Winner
- Category: World Series Gold
- Prize money: $60,000
- Year: World Tour 2011

The Women's United States Squash Open 2011 is the women's edition of the 2011 United States Open (squash), which is a WSA World Series event Gold (prize money: $60 000). The event took place at the Daskalakis Athletic Center in Philadelphia, Pennsylvania in the United States from 30 September to 6 October. Laura Massaro won her first US Open trophy, beating Kasey Brown in the final.

== Prize money and ranking points ==
For 2011, the prize purse was $60,000. The prize money and points breakdown is as follows:

Prize money US Open (2011)
Event	W	F	SF	QF	1R
Points (WSA)	3360	2310	1365	735	365.5
Prize money	$9,500	$6,500	$4,250	$2,625	$1,500

== Seeds ==
1. (Malaysia) Nicol David (quarterfinals)
2. (England) Jenny Duncalf (semifinals)
3. (Republic of Ireland) Madeline Perry (semifinals)
4. (Australia) Rachael Grinham (quarterfinals)
5. (England) Laura Massaro (champion)
6. (Australia) Kasey Brown (final)
7. (Egypt) Omneya Abdel Kawy (first round)
8. (France) Camille Serme (quarterfinals)

== Draw and results ==
First round
1	(Malaysia) Nicol David	11	11	11	11
(New Zealand) Joelle King	11	8	6	5
6	(Australia) Kasey Brown	11	11	11
Q	(India) Dipika Pallikal	8	8	6
3	(Republic of Ireland) Madeline Perry	11	13	8	11
Q	(Australia) Donna Urquhart	6	11	11	5
8	(France) Camille Serme	10	3	11	11	11
WC	(United States) Latasha Khan	12	11	9	7	8
Q	(Malaysia) Delia Arnold	13	4	6	4
5	(England) Laura Massaro	11	11	11	11
(Egypt) Raneem El Weleily	11	11	9	9	12
4	(Australia) Rachael Grinham	8	5	11	11	14
(Hong Kong) Annie Au	11	11	11
7	(Egypt) Omneya Abdel Kawy	1	1	3
Q	(United States) Amanda Sobhy	10	6	5
2	(England) Jenny Duncalf	12	11	11

Quarter finals
1	(Malaysia) Nicol David	9	11	9	4
6	(Australia) Kasey Brown	11	6	11	11
3	(Republic of Ireland) Madeline Perry	11	11	11
8	(France) Camille Serme	6	7	7
5	(England) Laura Massaro	11	11	11
4	(Australia) Rachael Grinham	3	3	7
(Hong Kong) Annie Au	3	11	8	8
2	(England) Jenny Duncalf	11	10	11	11

Semi finals *
6	(Australia) Kasey Brown	12	6	11	11
3	(Republic of Ireland) Madeline Perry	10	11	6	6
5	(England) Laura Massaro	13	11	13
2	(England) Jenny Duncalf	11	5	11

Final
6	(Australia) Kasey Brown	11	5	3	5
5	(England) Laura Massaro *	5	11	11	11

== See also ==
- United States Open (squash)
- 2011 Women's World Open Squash Championship
- Men's United States Open (squash) 2011
- WSA World Series 2011

Preceded by Australian Open; Australia (Canberra); 2011	WSA World Series 2011; US Open; United States (Philadelphia); 2011	Succeeded by Qatar Classic; Qatar (Doha); 2011
