= Squash at the 2010 Commonwealth Games – Women's doubles =

The Women's doubles event at the 2010 Commonwealth Games was held at the Siri Fort Sports Complex, New Delhi from 9 October to 13 October.

Jaclyn Hawkes and Joelle King of New Zealand won the gold medal.

== Seeds ==
1. (Australia) Kasey Brown & Donna Urquhart
2. (Australia) Lisa Camilleri & Amelia Pittock
3. (England) Jenny Duncalf & Laura Massaro
4. (New Zealand) Jaclyn Hawkes & Joelle King
5. (England) Tania Bailey & Sarah Kippax
6. (Scotland) Lisa Aitken & Frania Gillen-Buchert
7. (New Zealand) Tamsyn Leevey & Kylie Lindsay
8. (Malaysia) Delia Arnold & Low Wee Wern

== Finals ==
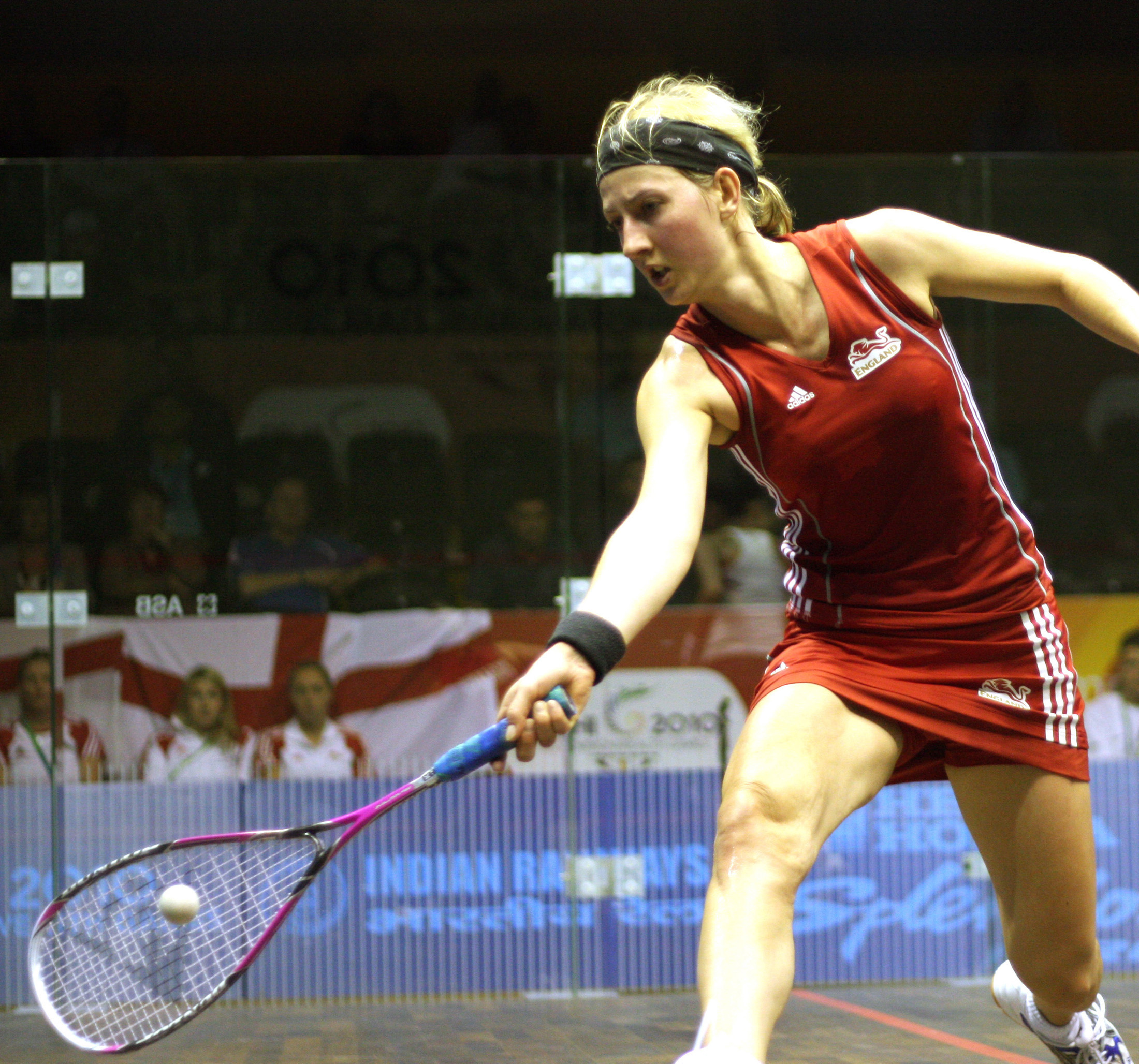
XIX Commonwealth Games Squash (Women’s): Alison Waters of England in action against Joelle King of New Zealand, at Sirifort Sports Complex, in New Delhi on October 06, 2010

Quarterfinals
Kasey Brown (AUS); Donna Urquhart (AUS)	11	11
Delia Arnold (MAS); Low Wee Wern (MAS)	4	9
Jenny Duncalf (ENG); Laura Massaro (ENG)	11	11
Tamsyn Leevey (NZL); Kylie Lindsay (NZL)	4	9
Lisa Aitken (SCO); Frania Gillen (SCO)	9	8
Lisa Camilleri (AUS); Amelia Pittock (AUS)	11	11
Tania Bailey (ENG); Sarah Kippax (ENG)	4	11	4
Jaclyn Hawkes (NZL); Joelle King (NZL)	11	9	11

Semifinals
Kasey Brown (AUS); Donna Urquhart (AUS)	11	5	4
Jenny Duncalf (ENG); Laura Massaro (ENG)	6	11	11
Lisa Camilleri (AUS); Amelia Pittock (AUS)	11	5	5
Jaclyn Hawkes (NZL); Joelle King (NZL)	5	11	11

Gold Medal Match
Jenny Duncalf (ENG); Laura Massaro (ENG)	9	10
Jaclyn Hawkes (NZL); Joelle King (NZL)	11	11
Bronze Medal Match
Kasey Brown (AUS); Donna Urquhart (AUS)	11	10	11
Lisa Camilleri (AUS); Amelia Pittock (AUS)	4	11	5
