= 2004 Women's World Team Squash Championships =

Women's Championship

Women's World Team 2004
- 14th World Women's Team Championship
- Location: Amsterdam, Netherlands
- Date(s): September 26 - October 02, 2004

Results
- Champions: Australia
- Runners-up: England
- Third place: New Zealand

The 2004 Women's World Team Squash Championships was the women's edition of the 2004 World Team Squash Championships organized by the World Squash Federation, held in Amsterdam, Netherlands from September 26 until October 2, 2004.

== Seeds ==
1. Australia
2. England
3. Netherlands
4. Egypt
5. Malaysia
6. New Zealand
7. Scotland
8. Canada
9. (Republic of Ireland) Ireland
10. United States
11. Belgium
12. France
13. South Africa
14. Denmark
15. Hong Kong
16. Germany
17. Switzerland
18. Japan
19. Austria

== First round ==
=== Pool A ===
Team One	Team Two	Score
Australia	(Republic of Ireland) Ireland	3-0
Canada	Germany	2-1
Australia	Germany	3-0
Australia	Switzerland	3-0
Australia	Canada	3-0
(Republic of Ireland) Ireland	Germany	2-1
(Republic of Ireland) Ireland	Switzerland	2-1
(Republic of Ireland) Ireland	Canada	2-1
Canada	Germany	2-1
Canada	Switzerland	3-0
Switzerland	Germany	2-1

Pos	Nation	Team	P	W	L	Pts
1	Australia	Natalie Grinham, Rachael Grinham, Amelia Pittock, Melissa Martin	4	4	0	8
2	(Republic of Ireland) Ireland	Madeline Perry, Aisling Blake, Anna McGeever, Laura Mylotte	4	3	1	6
3	Canada	Runa Reta, Melanie Jans, Marnie Baizley, Alana Miller	4	2	2	4
4	Switzerland	Olivia Hauser, Manuela Zehnder, Gaby Schmohl, Gabi Hegi	4	1	3	2
5	Germany	Karin Beriere, Carola Weiss, Katharina Witt, Kathrin Rohrmueller	4	0	4	0

=== Pool B ===
Team One	Team Two	Score
England	United States	3-0
England	Hong Kong	3-0
England	Japan	3-0
England	Scotland	3-0
United States	Hong Kong	2-1
United States	Scotland	3-0
United States	Japan	3-0
Hong Kong	Japan	3-0
Hong Kong	Scotland	2-1
Scotland	Japan	2-1

Pos	Nation	Team	P	W	L	Pts
1	England	Cassie Jackman, Linda Elriani, Fiona Geaves, Jenny Duncalf	4	4	0	8
2	United States	Louisa Hall, Latasha Khan, Michelle Quibell, Meredeth Quick	4	3	1	4
3	Hong Kong	Rebecca Chiu, Karen Lau, Annie Au, Joey Chan	4	2	2	4
4	Scotland	Wendy Maitland, Susan Dalrymple, Louise Philip, Frania Gillen-Buchert	4	1	3	2
5	Japan	Chinatsu Matsui, Kozue Onizawa, Sachiko Shinta, Miyuki Adachi	4	0	4	0

=== Pool C ===
Team One	Team Two	Score
Netherlands	Belgium	2-1
New Zealand	Austria	3-0
New Zealand	Denmark	3-0
New Zealand	Belgium	3-0
New Zealand	Netherlands	2-1
Netherlands	Denmark	3-0
Netherlands	Austria	3-0
Belgium	Austria	2-1
Belgium	Denmark	2-1
Denmark	Austria	3-0

Pos	Nation	Team	P	W	L	Pts
1	New Zealand	Shelley Kitchen, Tamsyn Leevey, Louise Crome, Jaclyn Hawkes	4	4	0	8
2	Netherlands	Vanessa Atkinson, Karen Kronemeyer, Annelize Naudé, Magriet Huisman	4	3	1	6
3	Belgium	Katline Cauwels, Annabel Romedenne, Charlie de Rycke, Kim Hannes-Teunen	4	2	2	4
4	Denmark	Ellen Petersen, Line Hansen, Ditte Nielsen, Kira Petersen	4	1	3	2
5	Austria	Birgit Coufal, Pamela Pancis, Ines Gradnitzer, Theresa Gradnitzer	4	0	4	0

=== Pool D ===
Team One	Team Two	Score
Malaysia	France	2-1
Egypt	South Africa	3-0
Egypt	France	3-0
Egypt	Malaysia	2-1
Malaysia	South Africa	3-0
South Africa	France	3-0

Pos	Nation	Team	P	W	L	Pts
1	Egypt	Omneya Abdel Kawy, Engy Kheirallah, Raneem El Weleily, Eman El Amir	3	3	0	6
2	Malaysia	Nicol David, Sharon Wee, Tricia Chuah	3	2	1	4
3	South Africa	Claire Nitch, Tenille Swartz, Farrah Sterne, Karen van der Westhuizen	3	1	2	2
4	France	Isabelle Stoehr, Célia Allamargot, Soraya Renai, Maud Duplomb	3	0	3	0

== Quarter finals ==
Team One	Team Two	Score
Australia	Malaysia	3-0
New Zealand	United States	3-0
Egypt	(Republic of Ireland) Ireland	2-1
England	Netherlands	2-1

== Semi finals ==
Team One	Team Two	Score
Australia	Egypt	3-0
England	New Zealand	3-0

== Third Place Play Off ==
Team One	Team Two	Score
New Zealand	Egypt	2-0

== Final ==
Australia
2
FINAL
Amsterdam, Netherlands
2 October 2004

England
0

			1	2	3	4	5
1	(Australia) (England)	Rachael Grinham; Cassie Jackman	3; 9	9; 5	6; 9	9; 1	9; 5
2	(Australia) (England)	Natalie Grinham; Linda Elriani	9; 4	9; 7	9; 2
3	(Australia) (England)	Amelia Pittock; Fiona Geaves

Preceded by Denmark; 2002	Squash World Team; Netherlands; 2004	Succeeded by Canada; 2006

== See also ==
- World Team Squash Championships
- World Squash Federation
- World Open (squash)
