= Women's Malaysian Open Squash Championships 2011 =

Malaysian Open 2011
- 33rd WSA Malaysian Open

Details
- Event name: Malaysian Open Squash Championships 2011
- Location: Kuala Lumpur Malaysia
- Venue: National Squash Centre; Bukit Jalil
- Website www.squashsite.co.uk/2009/malaysianopen2011.htm

Women's Winner
- Category: World Series Gold
- Prize money: $68,500
- Year: World Tour 2011

The Women's Malaysian Open Squash Championships 2011 is the women's edition of the 2011 Malaysian Open Squash Championships, which is a tournament of the WSA World Series event Gold (prize money: $68,500). The event took place in Kuala Lumpur in Malaysia from 20 July to 23 July. Nicol David won her seventh Malaysian Open trophy, beating Jenny Duncalf in the final.

== Prize money and ranking points ==
For 2011, the prize purse was $68,500. The prize money and points breakdown is as follows:

Prize money Malaysian Open (2011)
Event	W	F	SF	QF	1R
Points (WSA)	3360	2310	1365	735	365,5
Prize money	$11,115	$7,605	$4,975	$3,070	$1,755

== Seeds ==
1. (Malaysia) Nicol David (champion)
2. (England) Jenny Duncalf (final)
3. (Australia) Rachael Grinham (quarterfinals)
4. (Republic of Ireland) Madeline Perry (first round)
5. (Australia) Kasey Brown (quarterfinals)
6. (England) Laura Massaro (quarterfinals)
7. (Egypt) Omneya Abdel Kawy (semifinals)
8. (France) Camille Serme (semifinals)

== Draw and results ==
First round
1	(Malaysia) Nicol David	11	11	11
(Australia) Donna Urquhart	7	6	4
6	(England) Laura Massaro	11	11	12
Q	(England) Sarah Kippax	9	7	10
3	(Australia) Rachael Grinham	11	7	11	11
(Hong Kong) Annie Au	8	11	6	9
(Egypt) Omneya Abdel Kawy	10	9	14	11	11
(Malaysia) Delia Arnold	12	11	12	9	3
(Egypt) Raneem El Weleily	9	11	8	11	9
6	(France) Camille Serme	11	8	11	8	11
Q	(New Zealand) Joelle King	11	11	11
4	(Republic of Ireland) Madeline Perry	9	2	6
Q	(India) Dipika Pallikal	11	4	11	11	3
5	(Australia) Kasey Brown	6	11	13	7	11
Q	(Malaysia) Low Wee Wern	6	9	10
2	(England) Jenny Duncalf	11	11	12

Quarter finals
1	(Malaysia) Nicol David	11	9	11	11
6	(England) Laura Massaro	7	11	1	6
3	(Australia) Rachael Grinham	7	11	9	11	9
7	(Egypt) Omneya Abdel Kawy	11	4	11	2	11
8	(France) Camille Serme	11	11	11
Q	(New Zealand) Joelle King	6	8	8
5	(Australia) Kasey Brown	11	11	6	10	4
2	(England) Jenny Duncalf	9	6	11	12	11

Semi finals
1	(Malaysia) Nicol David	11	11	11
7	(Egypt) Omneya Abdel Kawy	9	10	4
8	(France) Camille Serme	12	5	7
2	(England) Jenny Duncalf	14	11	11

Final
1	(Malaysia) Nicol David	11	12	11
2	(England) Jenny Duncalf	6	10	5

== See also ==
- WSA World Series 2011
- Malaysian Open Squash Championships
- Men's Malaysian Open Squash Championships 2011

Preceded by Cayman Islands Open; Cayman Islands (Grand Cayman); 2011	WSA World Series 2011; Malaysian Open; Malaysia (Kuala Lumpur); 2011	Succeeded by Australian Open; Australia (Canberra); 2011
