= 2011 Women's World Open Squash Championship =

Squash championship

Women's World Open 2011
- 28th WSA World Squash Championship
- Location: Rotterdam, Netherlands
- Date(s): 1–6 November 2011
- Website www.worldopensquash2011.com

WSA World Tour
- Category: WSA World Open
- Prize money: $143,000

Results
- Champion: (Malaysia) Nicol David
- Runner-up: (England) Jenny Duncalf
- Semi-finalists: (Netherlands) Natalie Grinham (Mexico) Samantha Terán

The 2011 Women's World Open Squash Championship is the women's edition of the 2011 World Open, which serves as the individual world championship for squash players. The event took place at the New Luxor Theatre in Rotterdam in the Netherlands from 1 to 6 November. Nicol David won her sixth World Open trophy, beating Jenny Duncalf in the final.

== Prize money and ranking points ==
For 2011, the prize purse was $143,000. The prize money and points breakdown is as follows:

Prize Money World Open (2011)
Event	W	F	SF	QF	2R	1R
Points (WSA)	5300	3630	2150	1150	575	330
Prize money	$21,760	$14,720	$8,640	$5,120	$2,880	$1,600

== Seeds ==
1. (Malaysia) Nicol David (champion)
2. (England) Jenny Duncalf (final)
3. (Australia) Rachael Grinham (second round)
4. (Republic of Ireland) Madeline Perry (second round)
5. (England) Laura Massaro (quarterfinals)
6. (Australia) Kasey Brown (quarterfinals)
7. (France) Camille Serme (second round)
8. (Egypt) Omneya Abdel Kawy (first round)
9. (Hong Kong) Annie Au (second round)
10. (New Zealand) Joelle King (second round)
11. (Netherlands) Natalie Grinham (semifinals)
12. (Egypt) Raneem El Weleily (second round)
13. (Australia) Donna Urquhart (second round)
14. (New Zealand) Jaclyn Hawkes (second round)
15. (Mexico) Samantha Terán (semifinals)
16. (Malaysia) Low Wee Wern (quarterfinals)

== Draw and results ==
First round
1	(Malaysia) N David	11	11	11
(Malaysia) D Arnold	3	6	5
13	(Australia) D Urquhart	12	8	11	11	2
Q	(Egypt) N R Sherbini	10	11	11	9	11
11	(Egypt) R E Weleily	11	11	11
(England) S Kippax	9	9	5
6	(Australia) K Brown	11	11	11
(Netherlands) O Noom	6	5	4
7	(France) C Serme	12	11	2
(Egypt) N E Tayeb	10	7	1
16	(Malaysia) L W Wern	11	11	11
Q	(United States) L Khan	6	9	8
12	(Netherlands) N Grinham	11	11	11
Q	(Republic of Ireland) A Blake	5	3	9
4	(Republic of Ireland) M Perry	11	9	11	9	14
Q	(England) E Beddoes	4	11	5	11	12
Q	(England) L Selby	7	4	5
3	(Australia) R Grinham	11	11	11
Q	(Wales) T Evans	5	3	7
15	(Mexico) S Terán	11	11	11
(India) D Pallikal	11	9	11	11
14	(New Zealand) J Hawkes	8	11	8	7
Q	(Egypt) K E Dafrawy	12	11	12
8	(Egypt) O A Kawy	10	9	10
Q	(Egypt) Y Adel	9	7	6
5	(England) L Massaro	11	11	11
(Hong Kong) J Chan	11	6	11	6
9	(Hong Kong) A Au	13	11	7	11
Q	(Switzerland) G Huber	7	6	6
10	(New Zealand) J King	11	11	11
(Denmark) L Hansen	9	10	7
2	(England) J Duncalf	11	12	11

Second round
1	(Malaysia) N David	11	11	11
Q	(Egypt) N R Sherbini	7	6	7
11	(Egypt) R E Weleily	4	11	11	6	11
6	(Australia) K Brown	11	7	3	11	8
7	(France) C Serme	4	10	11	8
16	(Malaysia) L W Wern	11	12	2	11
12	(Netherlands) N Grinham	11	11	11
4	(Republic of Ireland) M Perry	6	5	8
3	(Australia) R Grinham	11	2	3	10
15	(Mexico) S Terán	4	11	11	12
(India) D Pallikal	11	11	11
Q	(Egypt) K E Dafrawy	6	7	6
5	(England) L Massaro	11	11	11
9	(Hong Kong) A Au	9	7	6
10	(New Zealand) J King	9	11	1	3
2	(England) J Duncalf	11	7	11	11

Quarter finals
1	(Malaysia) N David	11	12	11
6	(Australia) K Brown	7	10	4
16	(Malaysia) L W Wern	7	7	5
12	(Netherlands) N Grinham	11	11	11
15	(Mexico) S Terán	11	11	11
(India) D Pallikal	6	8	9
5	(England) L Massaro	9	7	7
2	(England) J Duncalf	11	11	11

Semi finals
1	(Malaysia) N David	11	11	11
12	(Netherlands) N Grinham	9	4	6
Final
1	(Malaysia) N David	11	11	11
2	(England) J Duncalf	2	5	0
15	(Mexico) S Terán	9	4	7
2	(England) J Duncalf	11	11	11

== See also ==
- 2011 Men's World Open Squash Championship
- World Open
- WSA World Series 2011

Preceded by Egypt (Sharm el-Sheikh); 2010	WSA World Open; Netherlands (Rotterdam); 2011	Succeeded by Cayman Islands (Grand Cayman) 2012
Preceded by Qatar Classic; Qatar (Doha); 2011	WSA World Series 2011; World Open; Netherlands (Rotterdam); 2011	Succeeded by Hong Kong Open; Hong Kong; 2011
