= 2011 WSA World Series Finals =

WSA World Series Finals 2011
- 1st WSA World Series Finals

Details
- Event name: WSA World Series Finals 2011
- Location: London England
- Venue: Queen's Club
- Website www.worldseriesfinals.com

Women's Winner
- Category: WSA World Series Finals
- Prize money: $50,000
- Year: World Series 2011

The 2011 WSA World Series Finals is the women's edition of the 2011 WSA World Series Finals (Prize money : $50 000). The event took place at the Queen's Club in London in England between 4–8 January 2012. Nicol David won her first WSA World Series Finals trophy, beating Madeline Perry in the final.

== Seeds ==
1. (Malaysia) Nicol David (champion)
2. (England) Jenny Duncalf (semifinals)
3. (Republic of Ireland) Madeline Perry (final)
4. (Australia) Rachael Grinham (first round)
5. (England) Laura Massaro (semifinals)
6. (France) Camille Serme (first round)
7. (Malaysia) Low Wee Wern (first round)
8. (Australia) Donna Urquhart (first round)

== Group stage results ==
=== WSA 1 ===
| (Malaysia) Nicol David | 11 | 11 | - | 6 | 6 | (France) Camille Serme |
| (Republic of Ireland) Madeline Perry | 11 | 11 | - | 7 | 6 | (Australia) Donna Urquhart |

| (Malaysia) Nicol David | 11 | 11 | | - | 4 | 4 | | (Australia) Donna Urquhart |
| (Republic of Ireland) Madeline Perry | 6 | 11 | 7 | - | 11 | 5 | 11 | (France) Camille Serme |

| (Malaysia) Nicol David | 11 | 12 | | - | 6 | 10 | | (Republic of Ireland) Madeline Perry |
| (France) Camille Serme | 11 | 8 | 8 | - | 9 | 11 | 11 | (Australia) Donna Urquhart |

| Rank | Nation | Match | Win | Low | Points |
|---|---|---|---|---|---|
| 1 | (Malaysia) Nicol David | 3 | 3 | 0 | 6 |
| 2 | (Republic of Ireland) Madeline Perry | 3 | 1 | 2 | 2 |
| 3 | (France) Camille Serme | 3 | 1 | 2 | 2 |
| 4 | (Australia) Donna Urquhart | 3 | 1 | 2 | 2 |

=== WSA 2 ===
| (England) Jenny Duncalf | 5 | 11 | 11 | - | 11 | 6 | 6 | (England) Laura Massaro |
| (Australia) Rachael Grinham | 9 | 11 | 11 | - | 11 | 9 | 8 | (Malaysia) Low Wee Wern |

| (England) Jenny Duncalf | 11 | 11 | - | 7 | 8 | (Malaysia) Low Wee Wern |
| (Australia) Rachael Grinham | | wo | - | | | (England) Laura Massaro |

| (England) Jenny Duncalf | | | - | | wo | (Australia) Rachael Grinham |
| (England) Laura Massaro | 11 | 11 | - | 3 | 4 | (Malaysia) Low Wee Wern |

| Rank | Nation | Match | Win | Low | Points |
|---|---|---|---|---|---|
| 1 | (England) Jenny Duncalf | 3 | 3 | 0 | 6 |
| 2 | (England) Laura Massaro | 3 | 2 | 1 | 4 |
| 3 | (Australia) Rachael Grinham | 3 | 1 | 2 | 2 |
| 4 | (Malaysia) Low Wee Wern | 3 | 0 | 3 | 0 |

== Draw and results ==
Semi finals
1st WSA1 | (Malaysia) Nicol David | 8 | 11 | 11
2nd WSA2 | (England) Laura Massaro | 11 | 4 | 3
2nd WSA1 | (Republic of Ireland) Madeline Perry | 11 | 11 | 11
1st WSA2 | (England) Jenny Duncalf | 13 | 8 | 5

Final
(Malaysia) Nicol David * | 11 | 11 | 11
(Republic of Ireland) Madeline Perry | 9 | 9 | 9

== See also ==
- 2011 PSA World Series Finals
- WSA World Series Finals
- WSA World Series 2011
