= Surbhi Misra =

Indian squash player (born 1990)

Personal information
- Born: 9 August 1990 (age 35) Jaipur, India
- Website: Surbhi Misra Sports Foundation

Sport
- Country: India
- Handedness: Right-handed
- Coached by: Cyprus Poncha
- Racquet used: Wilson
- Highest ranking: 79 (August 2010)

Surbhi Misra (born 9 August 1990) is an Indian squash player. She replaced a feverish Dipika Pallikal in the Indian squash squad in the women's singles event at the 2010 Commonwealth Games. That year, she reached her career-best ranking of 79. She founded the Surbhi Misra Sports Foundation in 2012 to uplift the ignored, hardworking sportspeople in India.
