= Cayman Islands Open =

Annual squash tournament in the Cayman Islands

Details
- Event name: Cedrus Investments Cayman Islands Open
- Location: Grand Cayman, Cayman Islands

Women's PSA World Tour
- Category: World Series Gold
- Prize money: $68,500
- Most recent champion(s): (Malaysia) Nicol David

Cayman Islands Open is an annual squash tournament held in April in the Cayman Islands. The women's tournament is part of the WSA World Series, the highest level of competition. The tournament was established in 2009.

== Past Results ==
=== Women's ===
Year	Champion	Runner-up	Score in final
2013	No competition		
2012	not held due to the 2012 World Open		
2011	(Malaysia) Nicol David	(England) Jenny Duncalf	11–7, 11–6, 12–14, 11-4
2010	(Malaysia) Nicol David	(United States) Natalie Grainger	11–8, 11–6, 11-5
2009	(Malaysia) Nicol David	(England) Jenny Duncalf	11–8, 11–4, 11-6

=== Men's ===
Year	Champion	Runner-up	Score in final
2013	No competition		
2012	No competition		
2011	(Botswana) Alister Walker	(Egypt) Ramy Ashour	11–5, 13–11, 6-11, 11-8
2010	(Trinidad and Tobago) Colin Ramasra	(Cayman Islands) Cameron Stafford	7-11, 11–5, 11–7, 11-9
2009	(Cayman Islands) Dean Watson	(Barbados) Shawn Simpson	11–5, 1-11, 11–7, 11-9
