= Melody Francis =

Australian squash player (born 1988)

Personal information
- Born: 17 October 1988 (age 37) Sunbury, Australia

Sport
- Country: Australia
- Handedness: Right Handed
- Turned pro: 2007
- Coached by: Terry White
- Retired: 2014
- Racquet used: Grays

Women's singles
- Highest ranking: No. 34 (January, 2012)
- Title: 7
- Tour final: 11
- Updated on March, 2014

Melody Francis (born 17 October 1988) is an Australian professional squash player. She reached a career-high world ranking of World No. 34 in January 2012. She retired as a professional player in February 2014.
