= Lisa Aitken =

Scottish squash player (born 1990)

Personal information
- Nationality: British (Scottish)
- Born: 16 February 1990 (age 36) Dundee, Scotland
- Height: 165 cm (5 ft 5 in)
- Weight: 59 kg (130 lb)

Sport
- Handedness: Left Handed
- Turned pro: 2010
- Retired: Active
- Racquet used: Dunlop

Women's singles
- Highest ranking: No. 21 (December 2022)
- Current ranking: No. 69 (March 2025)
- Title: 7
Medal record
Women's squash
Representing Scotland
World Doubles Championships
Bronze medal – third place	2022 Glasgow	Mixed doubles
Representing Scotland
National Championships
Gold medal – first place	2018-2020	singles

Lisa Aitken (born 16 February 1990) is a professional squash player who represented Scotland at three Commonwealth Games. She reached a career-high world ranking of World No. 21 in December 2022 and is a three-time national champion.

== Career ==
Atiken represented the Scottish team at the 2010 Commonwealth Games in Delhi, India, where she competed in the singles and doubles events reaching the quarter-finals of the women's doubles with Frania Gillen-Buchert and the quarter-finals of the mixed doubles with Harry Leitch.

Eight years later, Aitken represented the Scottish team again at the 2018 Commonwealth Games in the Gold Coast, Australia, where she competed in the three events.

Aitken was three-time national singles champion at the Scottish National Squash Championships in 2018, 2019 and 2020. In 2022, Aitken represented the Scottish team for the third time at the 2022 Commonwealth Games in the Birmingham, England, where she competed in the doubles events.

In March 2025, Aitken won her 7th PSA title after securing victory in the Odense Open during the 2024–25 PSA Squash Tour.

== Personal life ==
Aitken is engaged to Scotland football captain Rachel Corsie. She has reflected about growing up and playing squash as a member of the LGBT community.
