= Amelia Pittock =

Australian squash player (born 1983)

Personal information
- Born: 25 July 1983 (age 43) Dromana, Victoria

Sport
- Country: Australia
- Retired: 2010
- Highest ranking: 26 (March 2006)
Medal record
Women's squash
Representing Australia
World Team Championships
Gold medal – first place	2004 Amsterdam	Team
World Doubles Championships
Silver medal – second place	2006 Melbourne	Mixed doubles
- Updated on 12 April 2022

Amelia Martin (née Pittock; born 25 July 1983) is a retired Australian professional squash player.

Pittock was born in Mornington, Victoria. In 2006, Pittock finished runner-up in the mixed doubles event at the World Doubles Squash Championships, partnering Cameron Pilley.

Her greatest achievement was being part of the Australian team that won the 2004 Women's World Team Squash Championships in Amsterdam in the Netherlands. She is married to squash player Rodney Martin and they have a son.

== World Team Championships ==
=== Finals: 1 (1 title, 0 runner-up) ===
Outcome	Year	Location	Opponent in the final	Score in the final
Winner	2004 Women's World Team Squash Championships	Amsterdam, Netherlands	England	2–0
