= Kanzy Emad El Defrawy =

Egyptian squash player

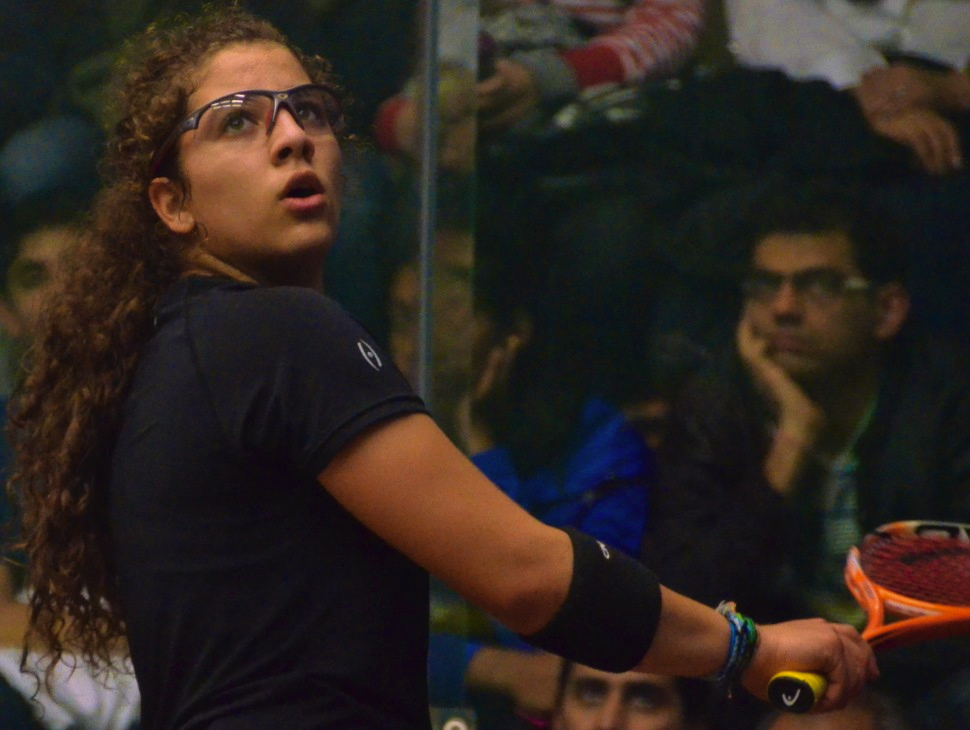

Personal information
- Full name: Kanzy Emad Farid El Defrawy
- Born: May 5, 1994 (age 32) Cairo, Egypt
- Height: 155 cm (5.09 ft)
- Weight: 64 kg (141 lb)

Sport
- Country: Egypt
- Handedness: Right handed
- Coached by: Chris Walker
- Racquet used: Salming

Women's singles
- Highest ranking: 29 (December 2011)
- Updated on May 2017

Kanzy Emad El Defrawy (Arabic: كنزى عماد الدفراوى [ˈkænzi ʕeˈmæːd ed.defˈɾɑːwi]; born May 5, 1994) is an Egyptian squash player, who formerly played the sport professionally. She achieved the highest world ranking of her career, World No. 29, in December 2011.

El Defrawy won her first Women's Squash Association Tour title at the NASH Cup in London, Ontario, Canada, in September 2014. In 2015, she won the Sentara Martha Jefferson Hospital Open and in 2016, won the Richmond Open, the Jordan Squash Federation Amman Open, the Play Squash Women's Open and the LiveStuff Open. During 2017, she has won the Delaware Women's Open and the Bahl and Gaynor Cincinnati Gaynor Cup.

El Defrawy started playing squash at seven years of age. She started to play internationally at 13, but had to undergo knee surgery aged 14 and had a difficult recovery from the surgery. She studied at Trinity College in Connecticut. El Defrawy won the Dutch Junior Open five times, the Pioneer Junior Open four times, the French and German Junior Opens once each, and the African and Arab Cups. She also won the U-19 World Championships twice.

El Defrawy no longer plays squash professionally. She lives in Dubai, where she works in the events industry. In 2021, she established a squash academy providing training by former professional players. She is also a Guinness World Records adjudicator.
