= Frania Gillen-Buchert =

Scottish squash player (born 1981)

Personal information
- Nationality: British (Scottish)
- Born: 13 November 1981 (age 44) Cape Town, South Africa

Sport
- Racquet used: Prince 03 Black
- Highest ranking: 53 (July 2003)
Medal record
Representing Scotland
National Championships
Gold medal – first place	2006, 2009, 2012	singles

Frania Gillen-Buchert (born 13 November 1981) is a Scottish female former international squash player who competed at three Commonwealth Games. She made her international debut in 2000 and achieved her career-best ranking of 53 in 2003.

== Biography ==
Buchert graduated at the University of Stirling.

Buchert represented the Scottish team at the 2006 Commonwealth Games in Melbourne, Australia, where she competed with Louise Philip in the women's doubles.

She represented the Scottish team at the 2010 Commonwealth Games in Delhi, India, where she competed in the singles and doubles events reaching the quarter-finals of the women's doubles with Lisa Aitken.

Buchert then competed at a third the Commonwealth Games in 2014 representing Scotland. where she competed in the doubles events.

She was a three-times national singles champion at the Scottish National Squash Championships in 2006, 2009 and 2012.

After the 2014 Commonwealth Games, she retired from international squash competitions, ending her 17-year squash career.
