= Lisa Camilleri =

Australian squash player (born 1983)

Personal information
- Full name: Lisa Carol Camilleri
- Born: 24 February 1983 (age 43) Tully, Queensland

Sport
- Country: Australia
- Handedness: Right Handed
- Turned pro: 2001
- Coached by: Vicki Cardwell
- Retired: 2017
- Racquet used: Harrow

Women's singles
- Highest ranking: No. 28 (May 2011)
- Updated on July 2018

Lisa Carol Camilleri (born 24 February 1983) is an Australian squash player. She reached a career-high world ranking of World No. 28 in May 2011.

She was born in Tully, Queensland.

Awards and achievements
Preceded by Alison Waters	WSA 'Cardwell' Comeback Player of the Year; 2013	Succeeded by Current holder
