= Kylie Lindsay =

New Zealand squash player (born 1983)

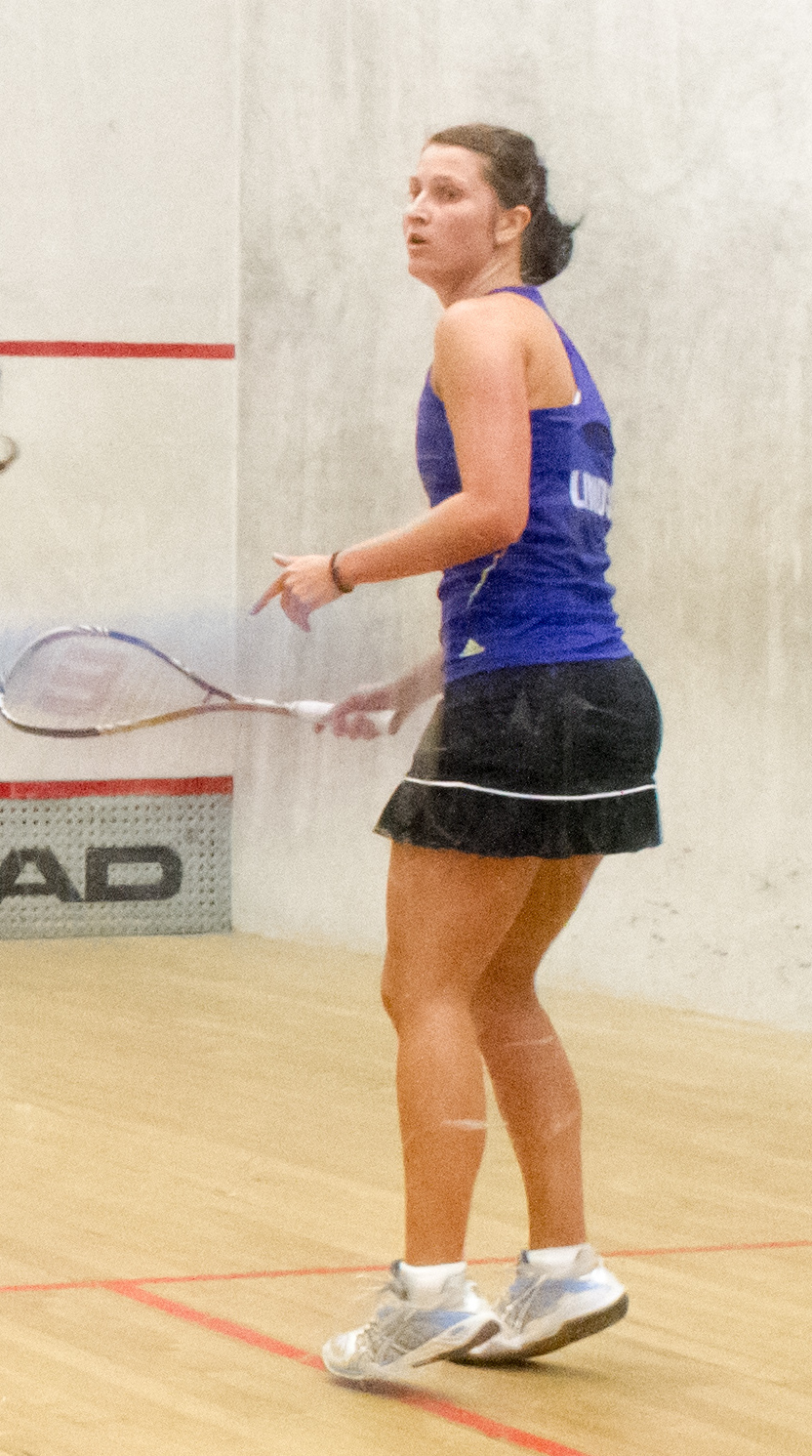
- Kylie Lindsay, 2012

Personal information
- Born: 13 October 1983 (age 42) Matamata, New Zealand

Sport
- Country: New Zealand
- Handedness: Right Handed
- Turned pro: 2000
- Coached by: Paul Hornsby
- Retired: 2014
- Racquet used: Wilson

Women's singles
- Highest ranking: No. 34 (November 2012)
- Title: 4
- Tour final: 7
- Updated on January 2015

Kylie Lindsay (born 13 October 1983 in Matamata) is a New Zealand professional squash player. She reached a career-high world ranking of World No. 34 in November 2012. After retiring as a professional player, she became a squash coach.
