= Sarah Campion =

English squash player (born 1983)

Sarah Campion (née Kippax)
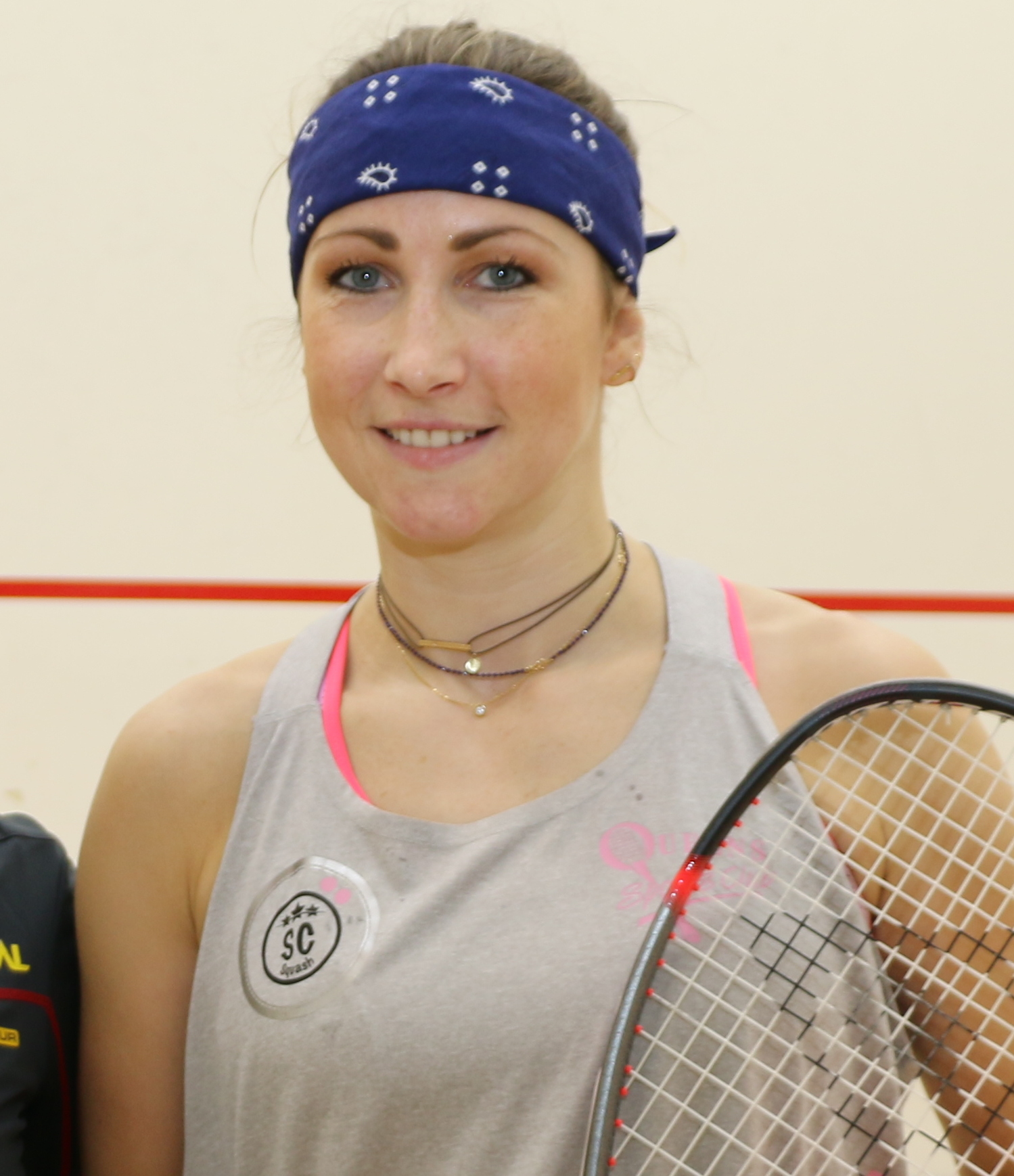
- Campion in 2020

Personal information
- Nationality: British (English)
- Born: 10 May 1983 (age 43) Chester, England

Sport
- Handedness: Right Handed
- Turned pro: 2001
- Coached by: David Campion; David Pearson
- Retired: 2014
- Racquet used: Dunlop

Women's singles
- Highest ranking: No. 15 (November 2011)
- Title: 9
- Tour final: 15
Medal record
Women's squash
Representing England
World Team Championships
Silver medal – second place	2010 Palmerston North	Team
Silver medal – second place	2012 Nîmes	Team
European Team Championships
Bronze medal – third place	2010 Aix-en-Provence	Team
Gold medal – first place	2011 Espoo	Team
Gold medal – first place	2012 Nuremberg	Team

Sarah Campion (née Kippax, born 10 May 1983) is a British former professional squash player who represented England. She reached a career high ranking of 15 in the world during November 2011.

== Biography ==
Based in Halifax, she became the first English woman in almost ten years to win three successive women's world tour titles when she clinched the Malco Open in Sweden in March 2009.

She enjoyed a whirlwind second half to the year 2010 after she was selected for the 2010 England team at the 2010 Commonwealth Games in Delhi, India. In the singles she reached the third round as the 10th seed. She also reached the quarter finals of the doubles. Soon after, she was part of the English team that won the silver medal at the 2010 Women's World Team Squash Championships.

She reached her career-high world ranking of World No. 15 in November 2011 and in 2012, she was part of the England team that won the silver medal at the 2012 Women's World Team Squash Championships.

Kippax won two gold medals for the England women's national squash team at the European Squash Team Championships in 2011 and 2012.

She attended another Commonwealth Games, representing the 2014 England team at the 2014 Commonwealth Games in Glasgow, Scotland, where she competed in the squash events.

Campion retired in 2014 and became the head coach at the Queens' Sport Club in Halifax.

== Personal life ==
She married her coach David Campion at St Philip's Church in Kelsall, Cheshire. They have two children.
