= Jaclyn Hawkes =

New Zealand squash player (born 1982)

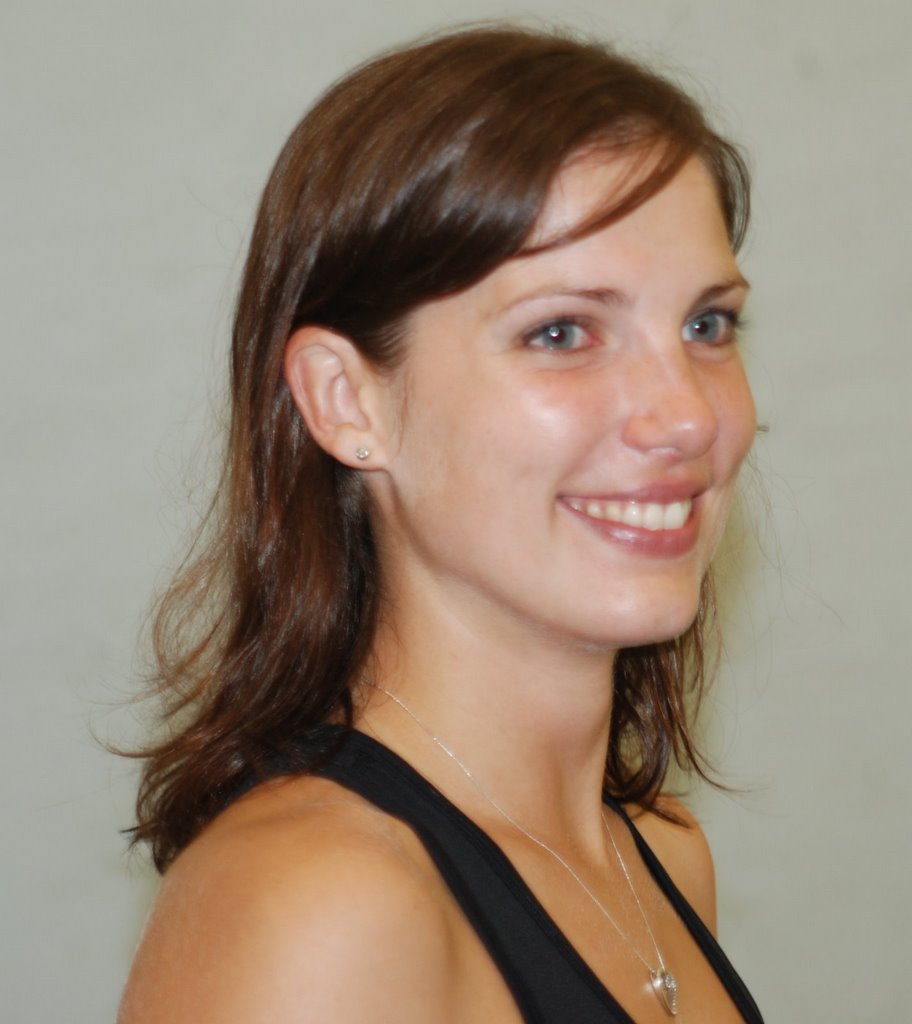
- Hawkes in 2009

Personal information
- Born: 3 December 1982 (age 43) Hong Kong

Sport
- Country: New Zealand
- Handedness: Right Handed
- Turned pro: 2003
- Coached by: Paul Hornsby
- Retired: 2013
- Racquet used: Wilson

Women's singles
- Highest ranking: No. 12 (December 2010)
- Current ranking: No. 19 (November 2012)
- Title: 3
- Tour final: 11
Medal record
Women's squash
Representing New Zealand
Commonwealth Games
Gold medal – first place	2010 Delhi	Doubles
- Updated on November 2012

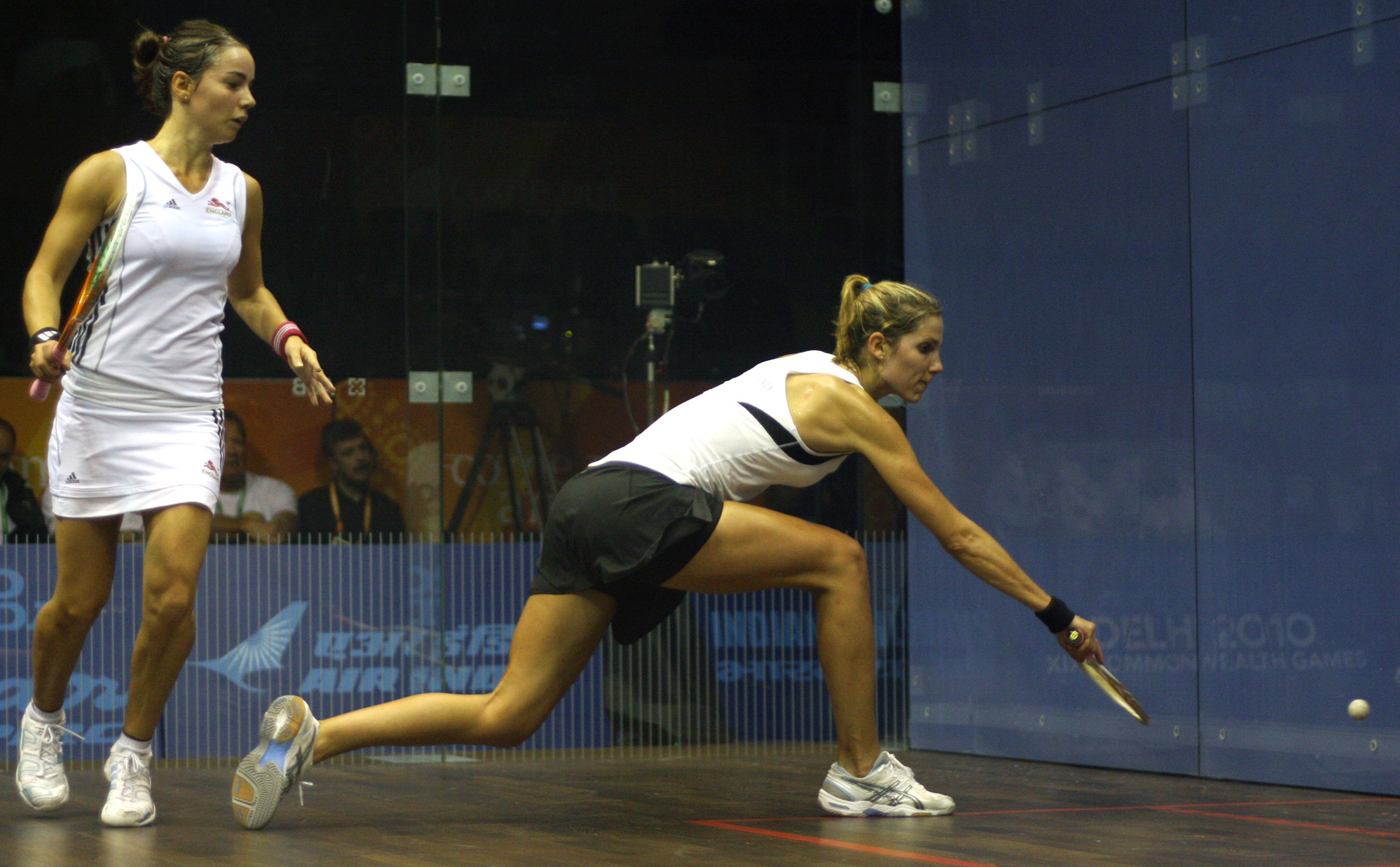
XIX Commonwealth Games-2010 Delhi Squash (Women's) Jaclyn Hawkes of New Zealand in an action against Jenny Duncalf England, at Sirifort Sports Complex, in New Delhi on October 06, 2010

Jaclyn Hawkes (born 3 December 1982 in Hong Kong) is a New Zealand professional squash player.

Hawkes grew up in Hong Kong and lived there until she was 15 when she moved to New Zealand. She started playing squash aged five because her mother Julie Hawkes was a New Zealand representative and is an ex-World Masters champion. While Hawkes played squash when she was younger she was much more keen on playing tennis (her father Richard was a Davis Cup player for New Zealand), hockey and netball. However, when she moved to New Zealand she made the New Zealand Junior team and travelled to Antwerp for the World Juniors in 1997 and really began to enjoy playing squash. It was after making the New Zealand Senior team in 2004 and competing in Amsterdam at the World Teams event that she decided to make squash her profession.

Hawkes is now based in Halifax in England after having completed a double degree in law and commerce in 2004 and has been playing full-time since the beginning of 2005. She reached a career-high world ranking of World No. 12 in December 2010.
