= Dipika Pallikal =

Indian squash player

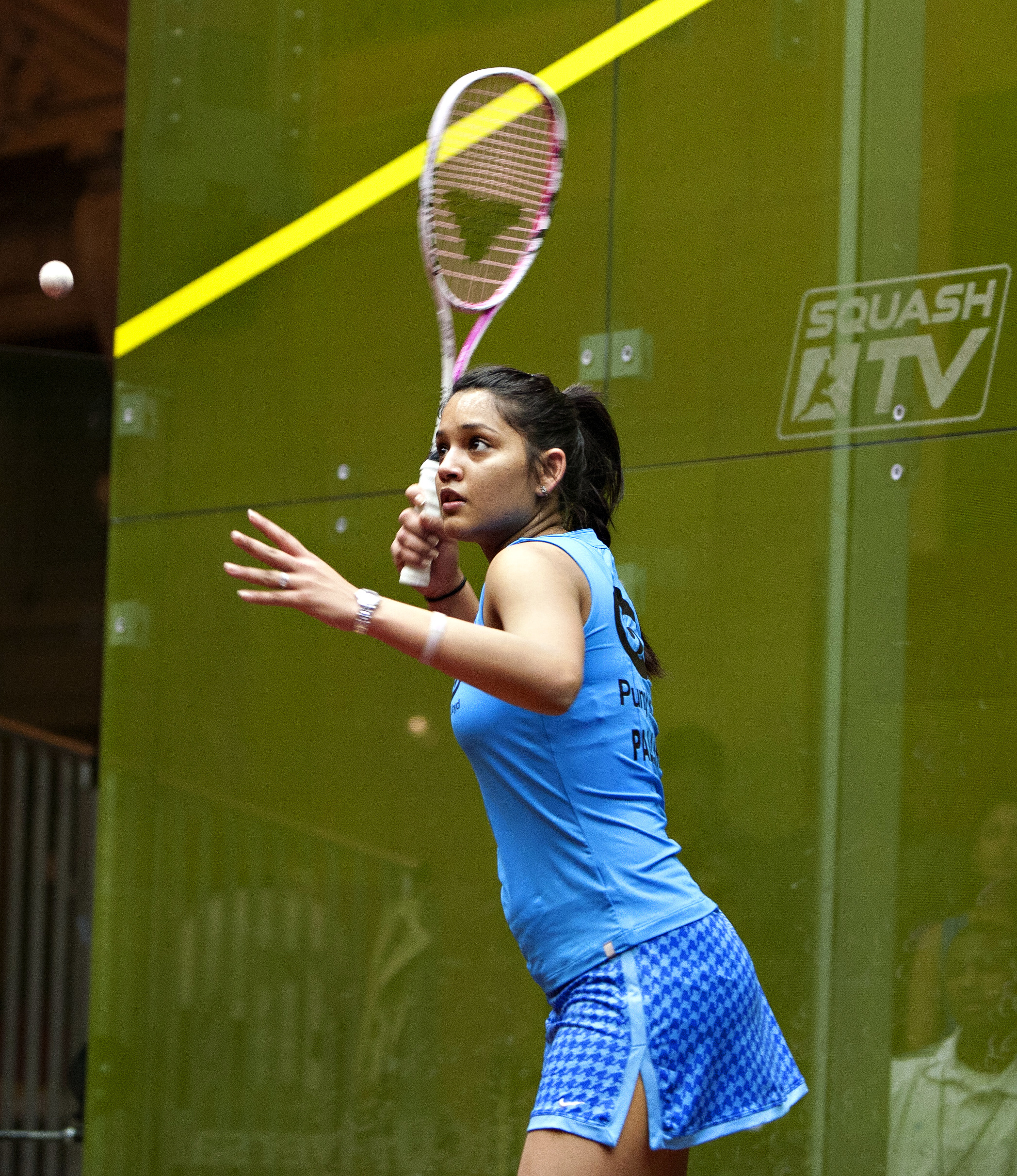

Personal information
- Full name: Dipika Rebecca Pallikal Karthik
- Born: Dipika Pallikal; 21 September 1991 (age 35) Kottayam, Kerala, India
- Height: 164 cm (5 ft 5 in)
- Weight: 69 kg (152 lb)
- Spouse: Dinesh Karthik (m. 2015)

Sport
- Country: India
- Handedness: Right-handed
- Turned pro: 2006
- Coached by: Sarah Fitz-Gerald
- Racquet used: Tecnifibre

Women's singles
- Highest ranking: No. 10 (December 2012)
- Current ranking: No. 19 (August 2016)
- Title: 11
- World Open: QF (2011)
- PSA Profile
Medal record
Women's squash
Representing India
World Championships
Gold medal – first place	2022 Glasgow	Doubles
Gold medal – first place	2022 Glasgow	Mixed doubles
Gold medal – first place	2024 Glasgow	Doubles
Gold medal – first place	2024 Glasgow	Mixed doubles
Silver medal – second place	2016 Darwin	Mixed doubles
Bronze medal – third place	2016 Darwin	Doubles
Bronze medal – third place	2017 Manchester	Doubles
Commonwealth Games
Gold medal – first place	2014 Glasgow	Doubles
Silver medal – second place	2018 Gold Coast	Doubles
Silver medal – second place	2018 Gold Coast	Mixed doubles
Bronze medal – third place	2022 Birmingham	Mixed doubles
Asian Games
Gold medal – first place	2022 Hangzhou	Mixed doubles
Silver medal – second place	2014 Incheon	Team
Bronze medal – third place	2010 Guangzhou	Team
Bronze medal – third place	2014 Incheon	Singles
Bronze medal – third place	2018 Jakarta	Singles
Bronze medal – third place	2022 Hangzhou	Team
Asian Championships
Gold medal – first place	2012 Kuwait	Team
Gold medal – first place	2023 Hangzhou	Mixed doubles
Silver medal – second place	2017 Chennai	Singles
South Asian Games
Gold medal – first place	2016 Guwahati	Team
- Updated on 13 April 2022

Dipika Pallikal (born 21 September 1991) is an Indian professional squash player. She was the first Indian player to break into the top 10 in the world rankings.

== Early life ==
Pallikal was born in Kottayam into a Malayali family. She is the daughter of Sanjiv Pallikal and Susan Pallikal. Her mother played international cricket for the Indian women's team, including India's inaugural women's Test match, in 1976.

== Career ==
Pallikal turned professional in 2006, but her career was filled with ups and downs initially. She became more consistent and started notching up winning performances after her brief training stint in Egypt in the beginning of 2011.

She clinched the first of her three WISPA titles for 2011 in September by winning the Orange County Open in Irvine, California. She notched up her second in the United States with another WISPA tour event victory. The third came in Hong Kong in the Crocodile Challenge Cup in December 2011 and that took her to number 17 in world rankings. However, it was her performance in the World Open, where she was beaten in the quarterfinals, that led to her claiming a ranking of 14 as a result of these victories in February 2012, surpassing the earlier best world ranking by an Indian – 27th by former national champion Misha Grewal in 1995.

In January 2012, she became the first Indian ever to reach the summit clash of a Silver event when she reached the final of the Tournament of Champions squash meet in New York. In August the same year, she went one step further when she reached the semi-finals of a gold event, the 2012 Australian Open, another first for any Indian.

Deepika Pallikal was an integral part of the Indian squash team that finished fifth in the 2012 Women's World Team Squash Championships. India, seeded tenth in the event, defeated higher ranked Netherlands and Ireland in the process. She defeated players like Madeline Perry in the tournament. Joshna Chinappa was another key player in the Indian line-up. In February 2013, she won the sixth WSA title of her career after outplaying Joey Chan of Hong Kong 11–9, 11–7, 11–4 in the final of the Meadowood Pharmacy Open in the Canadian city of Winnipeg.

In December 2012, she achieved a career best of ranking of World No. 10. She became the first female squash player to be conferred with the Arjuna Award, India's second highest sporting award, in 2012. In February 2014 she was back at number 10 in the Women's Squash Association (WSA) rankings despite enduring a tough start to the year. At the 2014 Commonwealth Games she along with Joshna Chinappa won the squash women's doubles gold medal, making it India's first ever Commonwealth Games medal in the sport. Pallikal picked up her 10th Tour title in January 2015 after triumphing at the Winter Club Open.

Pallikal refused to participate in the National Championship between 2012 and 2015 due to the inequality in prize money where the women's championship winner was awarded only 40% of the prize money of the men's championship winner. Equal prize money was agreed for the 2016 championships where she defeated Joshna Chinappa 4–11, 11–6, 11–2, 11–8, thus winning the title for the second time.

At the February 2016 South Asian Games, she was part of the gold medal-winning Indian Women's team She was then defeated in the first round of the 2016 PSA Women's World Championship in April. In May she was part of the silver medal-winning Indian Women's team at the Asian Team Championship in Taipei, where India were beaten 2–0 in the finals by Malaysia.

Pallikal Karthik competed under her maiden name (Pallikal) until 2016, adding her married name for the 2016-17 PSA Season commencing August 2016. Following her second Indian national Title (see below) she continued her good form winning the Australian Open, her 11th PSA title in August 2016.

== Titles ==
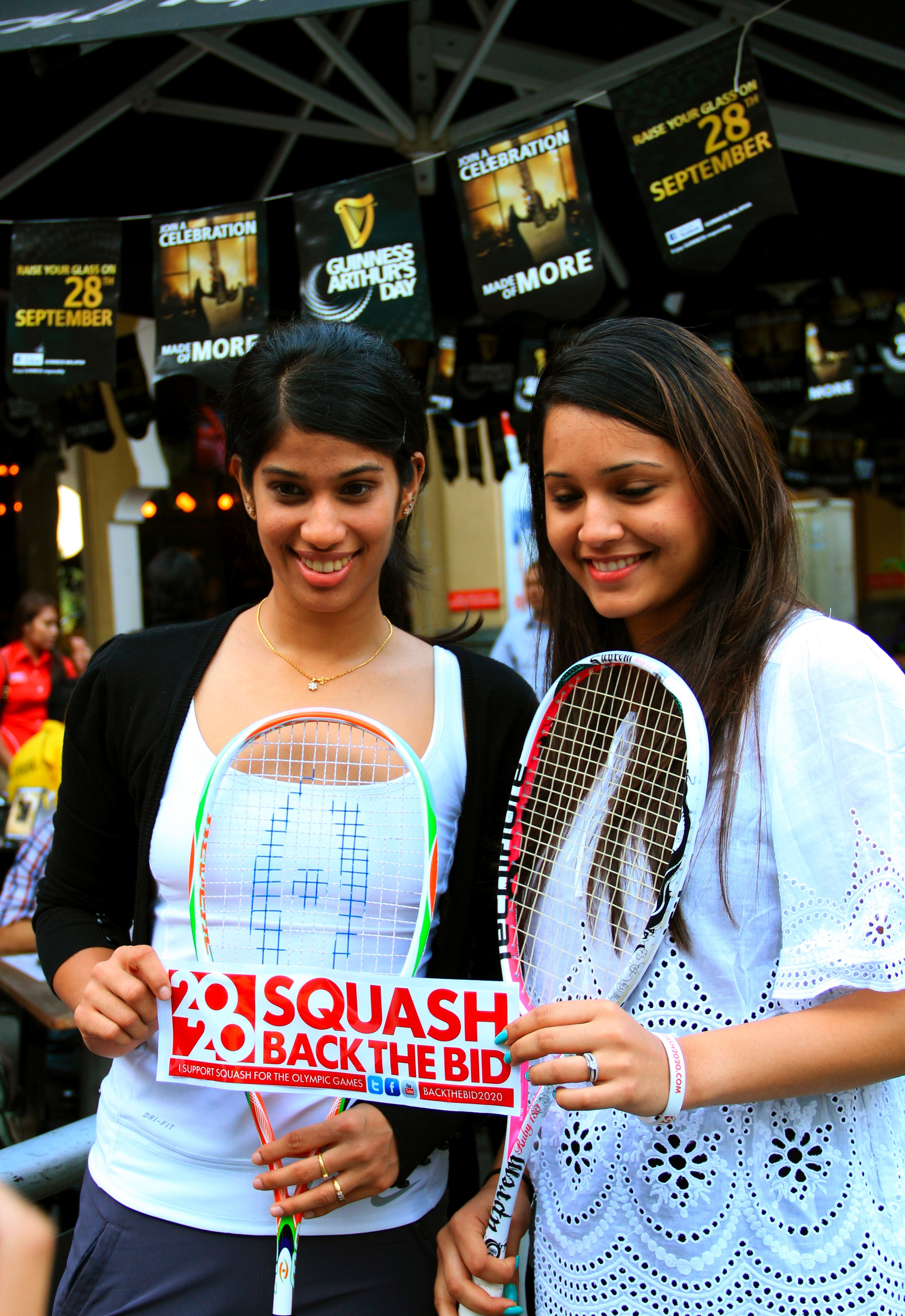
Joshna Chinappa with Pallikal Karthik, 2012

Following are the highlights of Dipika's WSA tour career.

Event	Year	Result
(Canada) Winnipeg Winter Club Open	2015	Winner
(China) Macau Squash Open	2013	Winner
(Canada) Meadowood Pharmacy Open	2013	Winner
(Australia) Australian Open	2012	Semi-finals
(United States) Tournament of Champions	2012	Runner-up
(Hong Kong) Crocodile Challenge Cup	2011	Winner
(Netherlands) World Open	2011	Quarter-final
(United States) Dread Sports Series	2011	Winner
(United States) Orange County Open	2011	Winner

== Awards ==
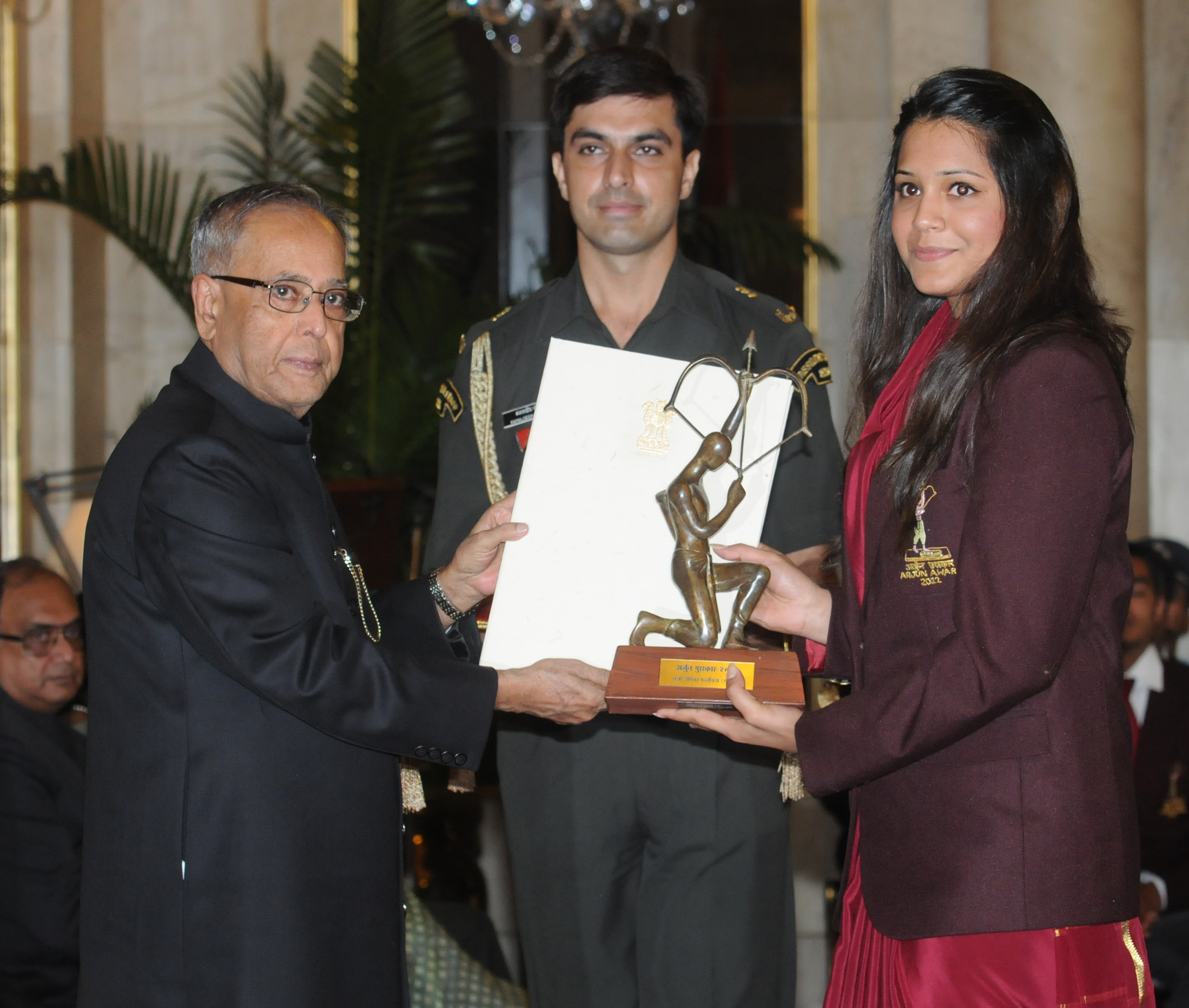
Pallikal Karthik receiving the Arjuna Award in 2012

Award	Year
Arjuna Award	2012
Padma Shri	2014

== Personal life ==
Pallikal studied at Ethiraj College for Women, majoring in English from 2012-2013. On 15 November 2013, she got engaged to Indian cricketer Dinesh Karthik. They married in the traditional Christian wedding style on 18 August 2015 and the Hindu wedding style on 20 August 2015. The couple became parents to twin boys, Kabir and Zian, on 18 October 2021. And they announced the birth of their daughter on 19 March 2026.
