= Jenny Duncalf =

English squash player (born 1982)

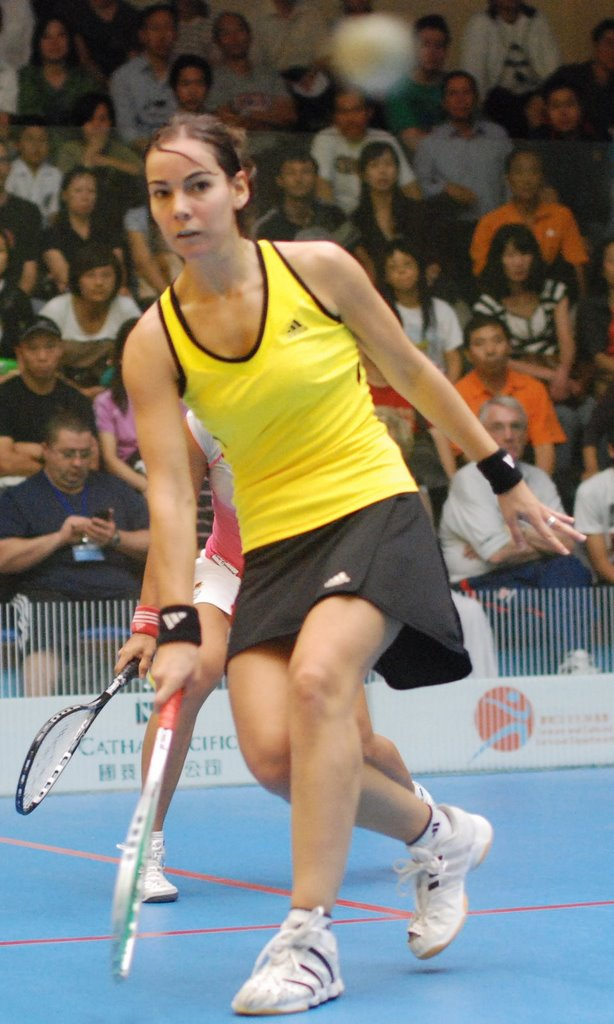
- Jenny Duncalf

Personal information
- Nationality: British (English)
- Born: 10 November 1982 (age 43) Haarlem, Netherlands
- Height: 1.63 m (5 ft 4 in)

Sport
- Handedness: Right Handed
- Turned pro: 1999
- Coached by: David Pearson
- Retired: 2019
- Racquet used: Head

Women's singles
- Highest ranking: No. 2 (December 2009)
- Title: 9
- Tour final: 23
- World Open: F (2011)
Medal record
Women's squash
Representing England
World Championships
Silver medal – second place	2011 Rotterdam	Singles
Bronze medal – third place	2008 Manchester	Singles
Bronze medal – third place	2012 Grand Cayman	Singles
World Team Championships
Gold medal – first place	2006 Edmonton	Team
Silver medal – second place	2004 Amsterdam	Team
Silver medal – second place	2008 Cairo	Team
Silver medal – second place	2010 Palmerston North	Team
Silver medal – second place	2012 Nîmes	Team
World Doubles Championships
Silver medal – second place	2017 Manchester	Doubles
Commonwealth Games
Silver medal – second place	2010 Delhi	Singles
Silver medal – second place	2010 Delhi	Doubles
Silver medal – second place	2014 Glasgow	Doubles
European Team Championships
Gold medal – first place	2004 Rennes	Team
Gold medal – first place	2005 Amsterdam	Team
Gold medal – first place	2006 Vienna	Team
Gold medal – first place	2007 Riccione	Team
Gold medal – first place	2008 Amsterdam	Team
Gold medal – first place	2009 Malmö	Team
Bronze medal – third place	2010 Aix-en-Provence	Team
Gold medal – first place	2011 Espoo	Team
Gold medal – first place	2012 Nuremberg	Team
Gold medal – first place	2013 Amsterdam	Team
Gold medal – first place	2015 Herning	Team

Jennifer Duncalf (born 10 November 1982) is a former professional squash player from England. She reached a career-high world ranking of World No. 2 in December 2009.

== Biography ==
Duncalf was born in Haarlem, Netherlands, but was a pupil at Harrogate Grammar School where she attended from 1994 to 2001. As a junior player, she won the European Junior Championship title. Duncalf won the European Individual Championship title in 2006 and 2007, and the British National Championship title in 2007 and 2009.

Duncalf represented the 2006 England team at the 2006 Commonwealth Games in Melbourne, Australia, where she competed in the singles and doubles events. Also in 2006, she was a member of the England team which won the World Team Squash Championships in 2006.

In 2008, she finished runner-up at the British Open, losing in the final to Nicol David. Duncalf ended the year 2009 on a high when she won three titles in a row—the Soho Square Open, the US Open and the prestigious Qatar Classic.

In October 2010, in the women's singles final of the 2010 Commonwealth Games in Delhi, Duncalf was defeated by Nicol David 11–3, 11–5, 11–7 in 40 minutes to settle for the silver medal. Soon after, she was part of the English team that won the silver medal at the 2010 Women's World Team Squash Championships.

In 2012, she was part of the England team that won the silver medal at the 2012 Women's World Team Squash Championships. Duncalf went to another Commonwealth Games after representing the 2014 England team at the 2014 Commonwealth Games in Glasgow, Scotland, where she competed in the squash events and won a silver medal, partnering Laura Massaro.

Duncalf won ten gold medals for the England women's national squash team at the European Squash Team Championships from 2004 to 2015.

She announced her retirement at the end of the 2019 season after gaining 133 caps for England.

== Personal life ==
Duncalf is in a relationship with fellow former No. 1 squash player Rachael Grinham. In 2017 they revealed their relationship, making them the first two squash players to publicly come out while still active in professional play.

== Major results ==
=== World Open ===
Outcome	Year	Location	Opponent in the final	Score in the final
Runner-up	2011	Rotterdam, Netherlands	(Malaysia) Nicol David	11–2, 11–5, 11–0

=== WSA World Series final appearances ===
British Open

Outcome	Year	Opponent in the final	Score in the final
Runner-up	2008	(Malaysia) Nicol David	9–1, 10–8, 9–0

Hong Kong Open

Outcome	Year	Opponent in the final	Score in the final
Runner-up	2010	(Malaysia) Nicol David	11-6, 12-10, 12-10

Qatar Classic

Outcome	Year	Opponent in the final	Score in the final
Winner	2010	(Australia) Rachael Grinham	11-5, 11-3, 11-3

Malaysian Open

Outcome	Year	Opponent in the final	Score in the final
Runner-up	2010	(Malaysia) Nicol David	11-6, 6-11, 11-7, 10-12, 11-5
Runner-up	2011	(Malaysia) Nicol David	11-6, 12-10, 11-5

== See also ==
- Official Women's Squash World Ranking
