= Donna Lobban =

Australian squash player (born 1986)

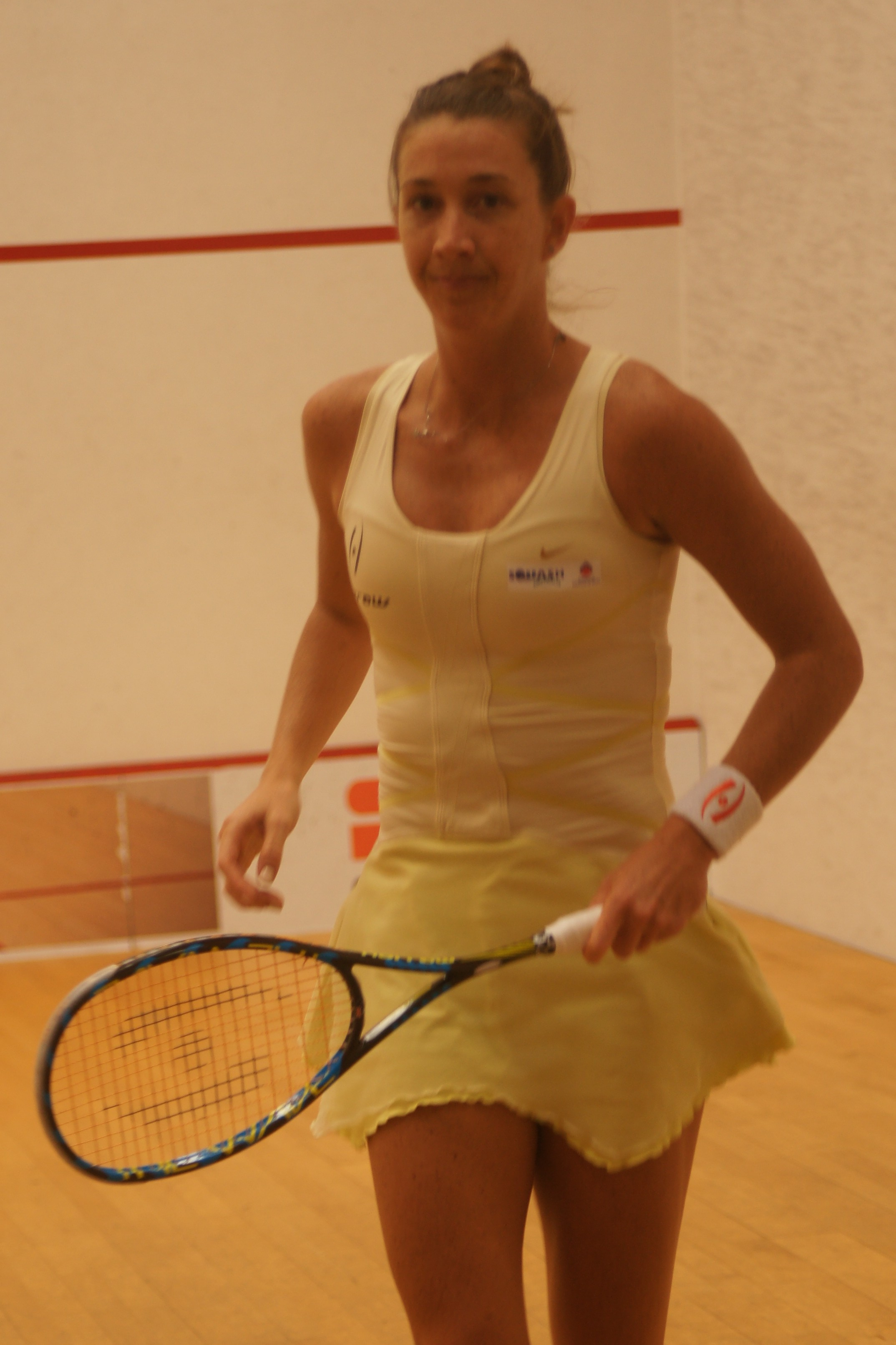
- Donna Lobban, Monte-Carlo Squash Classic 2016

Personal information
- Full name: Donna Lobban
- Born: 19 December 1986 (age 39) Yamba, New South Wales
- Height: 1.78 m (5 ft 10 in)
- Weight: 65 kg (143 lb)

Sport
- Country: Australia
- Handedness: Left Handed
- Turned pro: 2005
- Coached by: Byron Davis; Rodney Martin
- Retired: 2023
- Racquet used: Head

Women's singles
- Highest ranking: No. 13 (May 2011)
- Title: 12
- Tour final: 20
Medal record
Women's squash
Representing Australia
World Team Championships
Gold medal – first place	2010 Palmerston North	Team
World Doubles Championships
Gold medal – first place	2019 Carrara	Doubles
Gold medal – first place	2019 Carrara	Mixed doubles
Silver medal – second place	2016 Darwin	Doubles
Bronze medal – third place	2016 Darwin	Mixed doubles
Bronze medal – third place	2017 Manchester	Doubles
Commonwealth Games
Gold medal – first place	2018 Gold Coast	Mixed doubles
Bronze medal – third place	2018 Gold Coast	Doubles
Bronze medal – third place	2010 Delhi	Doubles
- Updated on 11 January 2023

Donna Lobban, also known as Donna Belle Urquhart, (born 19 December 1986) is an Australian retired professional squash player. She reached a career-high world ranking of 13 in May 2011.

== Early life ==
Lobban was born Donna Belle Urquhart.

== Career ==
Donna started playing squash from the age of 6. As a junior, she won five Australian Junior titles and was the runner-up at the Scottish and British Junior Opens in 2002 & 2003. She played for her country at the 2003 World Junior Women's Championships in Egypt where, at age 16, she made the last 16 of the individual draw, and was the runner-up in the teams event.

In 2010, she was part of the Australian team that won the gold medal at the 2010 Women's World Team Squash Championships. She reached a career-high world ranking of World No. 13 in May 2011.

She was the champion of the Monte-Carlo Squash Classic in 2017, defeating Zeina Mickawy in the final. In January 2023, she announced her retirement from professional squash.

== Personal life ==
In April 2018, she married Scottish professional squash player Greg Lobban and has been known professionally as Donna Lobban.
