= Madeline Perry =

Irish squash player (born 1977)

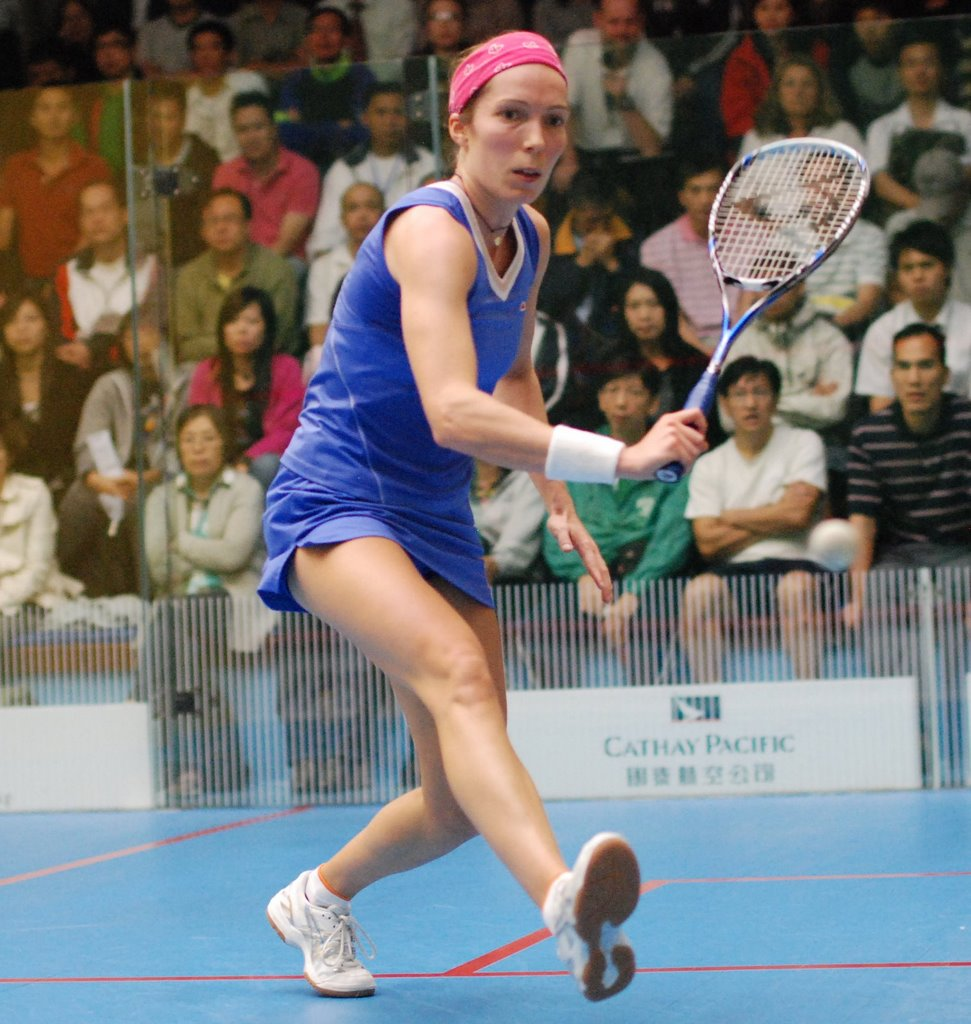
- Perry during the 2009 Cathay Pacific Hong Kong Open

Personal information
- Nationality: British (Northern Irish)
- Born: 11 February 1977 (age 49) Banbridge, Northern Ireland
- Years active: 1997-2015

Sport
- Handedness: Right Handed
- Turned pro: 1998
- Coached by: Marcus Berrett
- Retired: 2015
- Racquet used: Dunlop

Women's singles
- Highest ranking: No. 3 (April 2011)
- Title: 9
- Tour final: 23
Medal record
Women's squash
Representing Ireland
World Championships
Bronze medal – third place	2008 Manchester	singles
European Team Championships
Bronze medal – third place	2005 Amsterdam	Team
Bronze medal – third place	2011 Espoo	Team
Silver medal – second place	2012 Nuremberg	Team
Silver medal – second place	2013 Amsterdam	Team
Bronze medal – third place	2015 Herning	Team
Irish Championships
Gold medal – first place	1997–99, 2001–04, 2006–11, 2013, 2015	singles

Madeline Perry (born 11 February 1977) is a former professional squash player from Northern Ireland, who competed at five Commonwealth Games from 1998 to 2014 and is a record 15 times champion of Ireland.

== Biography ==
Perry was born and raised in Northern Ireland before later living in Philadelphia.

Perry won the first of her record 15 Irish national titles in 1997. She represented the 1998 Northern Irish team at the 1998 Commonwealth Games in Kuala Lumpur, Malaysia, where she competed in the singles and mixed doubles events.

Perry attended a second Commonwealth Games when selected for the 2002 Northern Irish team at the 2002 Commonwealth Games in Manchester, England, where she competed in squash tournament. Four years later, a third games appearance ensued as she represented the 2006 Northern Irish team at the 2006 Commonwealth Games in Melbourne, Australia, where she once again competed in singles and mixed doubles events.

In November 2006 at the World Open in Belfast, she justified her seeding of eighth by reaching the quarter-finals. She then won the Irish Open 2007 title in Dublin. One of her career highlights is defeating Nicol David in the quarter-finals of the Forexx Dutch Open where she took the world number one to 9–7 in the fourth set before beating David with a 6-11, 12-14, 15-13, 11-5, 11-9 scoreline.

A serious head injury sustained when Madeline was mugged in Milan, Italy, put a halt to the rest of the season. The inactivity caused a dip in her ranking that took her out of the top ten after nearly two years. In her first event back in 2008, in the Buler Challenge in Hong Kong, she reached the final. A year later, Perry described her quarter-final victory over then-ranked No. 1 Nicol David in the five-set, 76-minute quarter-final of the 2009 British Open as "the best victory of my career". (Perry lost the final to Rachael Grinham.) She then made it to the semis of the Seoul Open, followed by the semi-final berth at the CIMB Singapore Masters from an unseeded position. Perry went a fourth Commonwealth Games in 2010 in Delhi, India.

By April 2011, Perry had reached a career-high world ranking of No. 3.

In April 2014 she made squash history as the oldest female player to retain a top 10 position, when she was ranked No. 9 in the world. Shortly afterwards, Perry attended her fifth Commonwealth Games, being selected for the Northern Ireland team at the 2014 Commonwealth Games in Glasgow, Scotland, from 23 July to 3 August. One year later she won her 15th and last national title.

== Major World Series final appearances ==
British Open: 1 finals (0 title, 1 runner-up)

Outcome	Year	Opponent in the final	Score in the final
Runner-up	2009	(Australia) Rachael Grinham	11–6, 11–5, 12–10

Qatar Classic]: 1 final (0 title, 1 runner-up)

Outcome	Year	Opponent in the final	Score in the final
Runner-up	2011	(Malaysia) Nicol David	11–2, 11–7, 11-3

== See also ==
- Official Women's Squash World Ranking
