= 2012 WSA World Tour =

WSA World Tour 2012

Details
- Event name: WSA World Tour 2012
- Tournaments: 69
- Categories: WSA World Open; WSA World Series (5); WSA World Series Finals; WSA Gold & Silver (14); WSA Tour (48)
- Website www.wsaworldtour.com

Achievements
- World Number 1: (Malaysia) Nicol David (12 months)
- World Champion: (Malaysia) Nicol David

Awards
- Player of the year: (Malaysia) Nicol David
- Comeback player of the year: (England) Alison Waters
- Breakthrough player of the year: (Egypt) Nour El Sherbini

The WSA World Tour 2012 is the international squash tour and organized circuit, organized by the Women's Squash Association (WSA) for the 2012 squash season. The most important tournament in the series is the World Open held in Cayman Island. The tour features three categories of regular events, the World Series, which features the highest prize money and the best fields, Gold and Silver tournaments. The Tour is concluded by the WSA World Series Finals, the end of season championship for the top 8 rated players.

== 2012 Calendar ==
The Women's Squash Association organises the WSA World Tour, the female equivalent of the PSA World Tour Listed below are the most important events on the tour.

=== World Open ===
Tournament	Date	Champion	Runner-up	Semifinalists	Quarterfinalists
WSA World Open 2012 (Cayman Islands) Cayman Island; World Open – World Series Platinum $165,000 – Draw	13–21 December 2012	(Malaysia) Nicol David; 11–6 11–8 11–6	(England) Laura Massaro	(Egypt) Raneem El Weleily (England) Jenny Duncalf	(England) Alison Waters (Malaysia) Low Wee Wern (Republic of Ireland) Madeline Perry (Netherlands) Natalie Grinham

=== World Series ===
Tournament	Date	Champion	Runner-up	Semifinalists	Quarterfinalists
Kuala Lumpur Open Squash Championships 2012 (Malaysia) Kuala Lumpur, Malaysia; World Series Gold $70,000 – Draw	28–31 March 2012	(Malaysia) Nicol David; 11–4 12–10 11–9	(Hong Kong) Annie Au	(Egypt) Raneem El Weleily (Egypt) Nour El Sherbini	(England) Laura Massaro (Republic of Ireland) Madeline Perry (Australia) Rachael Grinham (India) Dipika Pallikal
British Open 2012 (England) London, England; World Series Platinum $95,000 – Draw	9–13 May 2012	(Malaysia) Nicol David; 11–6 11–6 11–6	(Egypt) Nour El Sherbini	(England) Laura Massaro (Egypt) Raneem El Weleily	(England) Jenny Duncalf (Hong Kong) Annie Au (France) Camille Serme (New Zealand) Joelle King
Malaysian Open Squash Championships 2012 (Malaysia) Kuala Lumpur, Malaysia; World Series Gold $70,000 – Draw	11–15 September 2012	(Egypt) Raneem El Weleily; 12–10 11–13 11–6 11–2	(Malaysia) Nicol David	(England) Laura Massaro (Malaysia) Low Wee Wern	(England) Jenny Duncalf (Hong Kong) Annie Au (Egypt) Nour El Sherbini (England) Alison Waters
US Open 2012 (United States) Philadelphia, United States; World Series Gold $70,000 – Draw	7–12 October 2012	(Malaysia) Nicol David; 14–12 8–11 11–7 11–7	(Egypt) Raneem El Weleily	(England) Laura Massaro (New Zealand) Joelle King	(England) Jenny Duncalf (Republic of Ireland) Madeline Perry (Australia) Kasey Brown (England) Alison Waters
Hong Kong Open 2012; Hong Kong, China; World Series Gold $70,000 – Draw	27 November – 2 December 2012	(Malaysia) Nicol David; 11–9, 11–6, 8–11, 11–7	(France) Camille Serme	(Netherlands) Natalie Grinham (Egypt) Omneya Abdel Kawy	(England) Jenny Duncalf (England) Alison Waters (Australia) Kasey Brown (Australia) Rachael Grinham

Final tournament	Date	Champion	Runner-up	Semifinalists	Round Robin
WSA World Series Finals 2012 (England) Queen's Club, London, England; WSA World Series Finals $50,000 – Draw	2–6 January 2013	(Malaysia) Nicol David; 11–3, 11–2, 11–9	(England) Laura Massaro	(England) Jenny Duncalf (France) Camille Serme	(Egypt) Raneem El Weleily (Egypt) Nour El Sherbini (Hong Kong) Annie Au (Netherlands) Natalie Grinham

=== Gold 50 ===
Tournament	Date	Champion	Runner-up	Semifinalists	Quarterfinalists
Cleveland Classic 2012 (United States) Cleveland, United States; Gold 50 $50,000 – Draw	29 January – 1 February 2012	(Malaysia) Nicol David; 7–11, 12–10, 11–7, 11–8	(England) Laura Massaro	(Republic of Ireland) Madeline Perry (United States) Amanda Sobhy	(England) Jenny Duncalf (Egypt) Raneem El Weleily (Hong Kong) Annie Au (Australia) Donna Urquhart
Australian Open 2012 (Australia) Canberra, Australia; Gold 50 $50,000 – Draw	15–19 August 2012	(Malaysia) Nicol David; 17–15, 11–2, 11–6	(England) Laura Massaro	(Republic of Ireland) Madeline Perry (India) Dipika Pallikal	(Australia) Kasey Brown (Australia) Donna Urquhart (England) Alison Waters (United States) Amanda Sobhy
Carol Weymuller Open 2012 (United States) Brooklyn, United States; Gold 50 $50,000 – Draw	27–30 September 2012	(England) Laura Massaro; 11–8, 11–4, 11–5	(Egypt) Raneem El Weleily	(Egypt) Nour El Sherbini (England) Alison Waters	(Malaysia) Nicol David (England) Jenny Duncalf (Hong Kong) Annie Au (New Zealand) Joelle King
China Squash Open 2012; Shanghai, China; Gold 50 $55,000 – Draw	25–28 October 2012	(Malaysia) Low Wee Wern; 6–11, 11–4, 3–11, 11–3, 11–9	(New Zealand) Joelle King	(England) Alison Waters (Australia) Kasey Brown	(Egypt) Raneem El Weleily (Hong Kong) Annie Au (Republic of Ireland) Aisling Blake (Egypt) Omneya Abdel Kawy

=== Silver 35 ===
Tournament	Date	Champion	Runner-up	Semifinalists	Quarterfinalists
Greenwich Open 2012 (United States) New York City, United States; Silver 35 $35,000	19–22 January 2012	(Egypt) Raneem El Weleily; 11–8 11–8 6–11 11–4	(New Zealand) Joelle King	(Mexico) Samantha Terán (India) Dipika Pallikal	(Republic of Ireland) Madeline Perry (Australia) Kasey Brown (Netherlands) Natalie Grinham (New Zealand) Jaclyn Hawkes
World Tour Pyramides 2012 (France) Le Port-Marly, France; Silver 35 $35,000	28 June- 1 July 2012	(England) Alison Waters; 11–8 12–14 11–5 11–8	(Malaysia) Low Wee Wern	(France) Camille Serme (Egypt) Omneya Abdel Kawy	(Republic of Ireland) Madeline Perry (Australia) Kasey Brown (Netherlands) Natalie Grinham (Republic of Ireland) Aisling Blake
Matamata Open 2012 (New Zealand) Matamata, New Zealand; Silver 35 $35,000	23–26 August 2012	(England) Alison Waters; 11–5 8–11 15–13 7–11 13–11	(New Zealand) Joelle King	(Malaysia) Low Wee Wern (New Zealand) Jaclyn Hawkes	(Republic of Ireland) Madeline Perry (Hong Kong) Annie Au (Australia) Rachael Grinham (Australia) Donna Urquhart

=== Silver 25 ===
Tournament	Date	Champion	Runner-up	Semifinalists	Quarterfinalists
Tournament of Champions 2012 (United States) New York, United States; Silver 25 $27,500	23–26 January 2012	(Netherlands) Natalie Grinham; 11–4 11–4 11–3	(India) Dipika Pallikal	(New Zealand) Jaclyn Hawkes (Egypt) Nour El Sherbini	(Australia) Rachael Grinham (Australia) Donna Urquhart (England) Sarah Kippax (United States) Latasha Khan
Atwater Cup 2012 (Canada) Montreal, Canada; Silver 25 $25,000	20–23 March 2012	(England) Alison Waters; 7–11 11–5 9–11 11–6 11–3	(Australia) Kasey Brown	(Hong Kong) Joey Chan (England) Sarah Kippax	(Denmark) Line Hansen (United States) Latasha Khan (Republic of Ireland) Aisling Blake (Switzerland) Gaby Huber
Texas Open 2012 (United States) Dallas, United States; Silver 25 $25,000	17–22 April 2012	(France) Camille Serme; 11–5 9–11 11–8 11–9	(New Zealand) Joelle King	(Hong Kong) Annie Au (Mexico) Samantha Terán	(Australia) Donna Urquhart (United States) Latasha Khan (Australia) Melody Francis (Czech Republic) Lucie Fialová
Irish Squash Open 2012 (Republic of Ireland) Dublin, Ireland; Silver 25 $25,000	25–28 April 2012	(England) Alison Waters; 11–4 11–4 12–10	(Republic of Ireland) Madeline Perry	(England) Laura Massaro (New Zealand) Jaclyn Hawkes	(Egypt) Omneya Abdel Kawy (England) Sarah Kippax (Egypt) Nour El Sherbini (Republic of Ireland) Aisling Blake
Atlantis Open 2012 (Egypt) Alexandria, Egypt; Silver 25 $25,000	17–20 September 2012	(Egypt) Nour El Tayeb; 11–6 13–11 11–4	(Hong Kong) Joey Chan	(England) Lauren Briggs (Egypt) Nouran Ahmed Gohar	(Republic of Ireland) Aisling Blake (England) Sarah Kippax (Egypt) Heba El Torky (Egypt) Habiba Mohd Alymohmed
Macau Open 2012; Macau, China; Silver 25 $25,000	18–21 October 2012	(New Zealand) Joelle King; 11–5 11–1 9–11 6–11 11–6	(Egypt) Omneya Abdel Kawy	(Republic of Ireland) Aisling Blake (India) Joshna Chinappa	(India) Dipika Pallikal (Malaysia) Delia Arnold (Japan) Misaki Kobayashi (South Africa) Siyoli Waters
Monte Carlo Classic 2012 (Monaco) Monte Carlo, Monaco; Silver 25 $25,000	29 October – 2 November 2012	(Netherlands) Natalie Grinham; 6–11 12–10 11–2 11–2	(Republic of Ireland) Madeline Perry	(Egypt) Omneya Abdel Kawy (Egypt) Heba El Torky	(Egypt) Nour El Tayeb (Czech Republic) Lucie Fialová (Wales) Tesni Evans (Scotland) Lisa Aitken

== Year end world top 10 players ==
Rank	2012	
1	(Malaysia) Nicol David	2415.625
2	(Egypt) Raneem El Weleily	1670.000
3	(England) Laura Massaro	1430.250
4	(England) Alison Waters	1049.789
5	(New Zealand) Joelle King	1043.412
6	(Egypt) Nour El Sherbini	943.281
7	(Malaysia) Low Wee Wern	865.556
8	(Hong Kong) Annie Au	840.222
9	(Republic of Ireland) Madeline Perry	736.105
10	(India) Dipika Pallikal	608.912

== Retirements ==
Following is a list of notable players (winners of a main tour title, and/or part of the WSA World Rankings top 30 for at least one month) who announced their retirement from professional squash, became inactive, or were permanently banned from playing, during the 2012 season:

- Tania Bailey (born 2 October 1979 in the Stamford, England) joined the pro tour in 1998, reached the singles no. 4 spot in March 2003. She won 6 WSA World Tour titles including the Coronation London Open and reached the final of the prestigious British Open in 2002 lost against Sarah Fitz-Gerald and the final of Hong Kong Open. She retired in February 2012.
- Engy Kheirallah (born 10 March 1976 in the Alexandria, Egypt) joined the pro tour in 1999, reached the singles no. 12 spot in October 2006. She won 5 WSA World Tour titles including the Alexandria Sporting Club Open in 2005. She retired in January 2012 after competing of the World Open 2011.

== See also ==
- PSA World Tour 2012
- WSA World Series
- 2012 Women's World Team Squash Championships
- Official Women's Squash World Ranking
- Women's Squash Association
