= 2012 Women's British Open Squash Championship =

British Open Squash Championships
- 82nd Women's British Open

Details
- Event name: Allam British Open 2012
- Location: London, England
- Venue: The O2
- Website britishopensquash.net

Women's Winner
- Category: World Series Platinum
- Prize money: $95,000
- Year: World Tour 2012

The Women's Allam British Open 2012 is the women's edition of the 2012 British Open Squash Championships, which is a WSA World Series event Platinum (Prize money: $95 000). The event took place at the O2 in London in England from 15–20 May. Nicol David won her fourth British Open trophy, beating Nour El Sherbini in the final.

== Prize money and ranking points ==
For 2012, the prize purse was $95,000. The prize money and points breakdown is as follows:

Prize Money British Open (2012)
Event	W	F	SF	QF	2R	1R
Points (WSA)	4800	3300	1950	1050	525	300
Prize money	$13,600	$9,200	$5,400	$3,200	$1,800	$1,000

== Seeds ==
1. (Malaysia) Nicol David (champion)
2. (England) Jenny Duncalf (quarter-finals)
3. (England) Laura Massaro (semi-finals)
4. (Republic of Ireland) Madeline Perry (second round)
5. (Egypt) Raneem El Weleily (semi-finals)
6. (Australia) Rachael Grinham (second round)
7. (Hong Kong) Annie Au (quarter-finals)
8. (Australia) Kasey Brown (first round)
9. (Netherlands) Natalie Grinham (second round)
10. (France) Camille Serme (quarter-finals)
11. (Mexico) Samantha Terán (second round)
12. (New Zealand) Joelle King (quarter-finals)
13. (Malaysia) Low Wee Wern (first round)
14. (India) Dipika Pallikal (second round)
15. (Australia) Donna Urquhart (second round)
16. (Egypt) Nour El Sherbini (final)

== Draw and results ==
First round
1	(Malaysia) N David	11	11	11
Q	(Pakistan) M T Pakay	2	3	6
11	(Mexico) S Terán	11	11	11
Q	(England) L Briggs	9	6	7
6	(Australia) R Grinham	11	11	11	15
(England) E Beddoes	13	7	5	13
12	(New Zealand) J King	11	11	11
Q	(France) C Aumard	6	7	4
3	(England) L Massaro	11	8	8	11	11
Q	(United States) L Khan	5	11	11	6	3
9	(Netherlands) N Grinham	11	11	11
Q	(England) S-J Perry	9	5	7
8	(Australia) K Brown	7	2	11	11	11
(New Zealand) J Hawkes	11	11	4	6	13
10	(France) C Serme	11	11	8	11
(England) S Kippax	8	9	11	5
WC	(England) A Waters	9	12	11	8	11
13	(Malaysia) L W Wern	11	10	7	11	7
Q	(Switzerland) G Huber	11	6	1	12
7	(Hong Kong) A Au	6	11	11	14
(Hong Kong) J Chan	8	7	11	11	3
16	(Egypt) N El Sherbini	11	11	8	5	11
Q	(Canada) S Cornett	7	8	6
4	(Republic of Ireland) M Perry	11	11	11
(Egypt) O A Kawy	11	11	9	5	5
14	(India) D Pallikal	8	9	11	11	11
(United States) A Sobhy	6	17	8
5	(Egypt) R El Weleily	11	19	11
Q	(Egypt) H El Torky	6	8	2
15	(Australia) D Urquhart	11	11	11
(Malaysia) D Arnold	6	12	8	6
2	(England) J Duncalf	11	10	11	11

Second round
1	(Malaysia) N David	11	11	11
11	(Mexico) S Terán	7	7	3
6	(Australia) R Grinham	11	5	8	11	13
12	(New Zealand) J King	3	11	11	5	15
3	(England) L Massaro	15	12	11
9	(Netherlands) N Grinham	13	10	6
(New Zealand) J Hawkes	2	9	5
10	(France) C Serme	11	11	11
WC	(England) A Waters	11	11	9	9	7
7	(Hong Kong) A Au	9	7	11	11	11
16	(Egypt) N El Sherbini	11	4	5	11	11
4	(Republic of Ireland) M Perry	6	11	11	3	5
14	(India) D Pallikal	4	11	4	11	7
5	(Egypt) R El Weleily	11	8	11	7	11
15	(Australia) D Urquhart	2	13	4	10
2	(England) J Duncalf	11	11	11	12

Quarter finals
1	(Malaysia) N David	8	11	11	11
12	(New Zealand) J King	11	3	4	0
3	(England) L Massaro	11	11	11	11
10	(France) C Serme	13	3	9	9
7	(Hong Kong) A Au	11	7	6	11	6
16	(Egypt) N El Sherbini	9	11	11	9	11
5	(Egypt) R El Weleily	12	11	11
2	(England) J Duncalf	10	7	5

Semi-finals
1	(Malaysia) N David	11	11	11
3	(England) L Massaro	5	8	4
Final
1	(Malaysia) N David *	11	11	11
16	(Egypt) N El Sherbini	6	6	6
16	(Egypt) N El Sherbini	14	7	11	11
5	(Egypt) R El Weleily	12	11	4	9

== See also ==
- WSA World Series
- 2012 Women's World Open Squash Championship
- 2012 Men's British Open

Preceded by Kuala Lumpur Open; Malaysia (Kuala Lumpur); 2012	WSA World Series 2012; British Open; England (London); 2012	Succeeded by Malaysian Open; Malaysia (Kuala Lumpur) 2012
