= Cleveland Classic 2012 =

Cleveland Squash Classic 2012
- 4th Cleveland Classic

Details
- Event name: Cleveland Squash Classic 2012
- Location: Cleveland, Ohio, United States
- Venue: Cleveland Racket Club
- Website www.squashsite.co.uk/2009/cleveland2012.htm

Women's Winner
- Category: Gold 50
- Prize money: $50,000
- Year: World Tour 2012

The Cleveland Squash Classic 2012 is the women's edition of the 2012 Cleveland Classic, which is a tournament of the WSA World Tour event International (Prize money: $50,000). The event took place at the Cleveland Racket Club in Cleveland, Ohio in United States from 29 January to 1 February. Nicol David won her first Cleveland Classic trophy, beating Laura Massaro in the final.

== Prize money and ranking points ==
For 2012, the prize purse was $50,000. The prize money and points breakdown is as follows:

Prize Money Cleveland Classic (2012)
Event	W	F	SF	QF	1R
Points (WSA)	2450	1610	980	595	350
Prize money	$8,550	$5,850	$3,825	$2,365	$1,350

== Seeds ==
1. (Malaysia) Nicol David (champion)
2. (England) Jenny Duncalf (quarterfinals)
3. (England) Laura Massaro (final)
4. (Republic of Ireland) Madeline Perry (semifinals)
5. (Australia) Kasey Brown (first round)
6. (Australia) Rachael Grinham (first round)
7. (Egypt) Raneem El Weleily (quarterfinals)
8. (Hong Kong) Annie Au (quarterfinals)

== Draw and results ==
First round
1	(Malaysia) Nicol David	11	11	9	8	11
Q	(New Zealand) Joelle King	4	9	11	11	7
8	(Hong Kong) Annie Au
(France) Camille Serme	wo
4	(Republic of Ireland) Madeline Perry	11	11	11
Q	(New Zealand) Jaclyn Hawkes	7	9	6
7	(Egypt) Raneem El Weleily	11	11	11	11
(Netherlands) Natalie Grinham	13	7	4	9
Q	(Australia) Donna Urquhart	10	11	11	13
5	(Australia) Kasey Brown	12	7	6	11
(Malaysia) Low Wee Wern	4	6	11	5
3	(England) Laura Massaro	11	11	9	11
WC	(United States) Amanda Sobhy	11	11	11
6	(Australia) Rachael Grinham	3	7	2
Q	(England) Sarah Kippax	8	10	7
2	(England) Jenny Duncalf	11	12	11

Quarter finals
1	(Malaysia) Nicol David	11	11	11
8	(Hong Kong) Annie Au	5	6	1
4	(Republic of Ireland) Madeline Perry	11	9	14	11
7	(Egypt) Raneem El Weleily	8	11	12	3
Q	(Australia) Donna Urquhart	8	11	6	2
3	(England) Laura Massaro	11	4	11	11
WC	(United States) Amanda Sobhy	6	11	11	4
2	(England) Jenny Duncalf	11	5	3	1

Semi finals
1	(Malaysia) Nicol David	11	11	11
4	(Republic of Ireland) Madeline Perry	3	4	6
3	(England) Laura Massaro	11	11	11
WC	(United States) Amanda Sobhy	9	5	6

Final
1	(Malaysia) Nicol David	7	12	11	11
3	(England) Laura Massaro	11	10	7	8

== See also ==
- Cleveland Classic
- WSA World Tour 2012
- 2012 Women's British Open Squash Championship
