= 2012 WSA World Series =

WSA World Series 2012

Details
- Event name: WSA World Series 2012
- Website wsaworldtour.com/site/players/world-series-standings
- Year: World Tour 2012

The WSA World Series 2012 is a series of women's squash tournaments which are part of the Women's Squash Association (WSA) World Tour for the 2012 squash season. The WSA World Series tournaments are some of the most prestigious events on the women's tour. The best-performing players in the World Series events qualify for the annual 2012 WSA World Series Finals tournament. Nicol David won her second WSA World Series Squash Finals trophy, beating Laura Massaro in the final.

== WSA World Series Ranking Points ==
WSA World Series events also have a separate World Series ranking. Points for this are calculated on a cumulative basis after each World Series event.

Tournament			Ranking Points
Rank	Prize Money US$	Ranking Points	Winner	Runner up	3/4	5/8	9/16	17/32
World Series	$70,000+	625 points	100	65	40	25	15	10

== 2012 Tournaments ==
Tournament	Country	Location	Rank	Prize money	Date	2012 Winner
Kuala Lumpur Open 2012	Malaysia	Kuala Lumpur	World Series Gold	$70,000	28–31 March 2012	(Malaysia) Nicol David
British Open 2012	England	London	World Series Platinum	$95,000	9–13 May 2012	(Malaysia) Nicol David
Malaysian Open 2012	Malaysia	Kuala Lumpur	World Series Gold	$70,000	11–15 September 2012	(Egypt) Raneem El Weleily
US Open 2012	United States	Philadelphia	World Series Gold	$70,000	7–12 October 2012	(Malaysia) Nicol David
Hong Kong Open 2012	Hong Kong	Hong Kong	World Series Gold	$70,000	27 Nov – 2 Dec 2012	(Malaysia) Nicol David
World Open 2012	Cayman Islands	Cayman Islands	World Open	$165,000	13–21 December 2012	(Malaysia) Nicol David

== World Series Standings 2012 ==
Performance Table Legend
10	1st Round	15	Round of 16
25	Quarterfinalist	40	Semifinalist
65	Runner-up	**100**	Winner

**Top 16 World Series Standings 2012**
Rank	Player	Number of Tournament	Kuala Lumpur Open	British Open	Malaysian Open	US Open	Hong Kong Open	World Open	Total Points
Rank	Player	Number of Tournament	MAS (Malaysia)	ENG (England)	MAS (Malaysia)	USA (United States)	HKG (Hong Kong)	CAY (Cayman Islands)	Total Points
1	(Malaysia) **Nicol David**	6	**100**	**100**	65	**100**	**100**	**100**	**565**
2	(Egypt) **Raneem El Weleily**	5	40	40	**100**	65	-	40	**285**
3	(England) **Laura Massaro**	6	25	40	40	40	10	65	**220**
4	(Egypt) **Nour El Sherbini**	5	40	65	25	15	-	15	**160**
5	(Hong Kong) **Annie Au**	6	65	25	25	15	10	15	**155**
6	(England) **Jenny Duncalf**	6	15	25	25	25	25	40	**155**
7	(France) **Camille Serme**	6	15	25	15	15	65	15	**150**
8	(Netherlands) **Natalie Grinham**	6	15	15	15	15	40	25	**125**
9	(Malaysia) Low Wee Wern	6	15	10	40	15	15	25	**120**
10	(Republic of Ireland) Madeline Perry	6	25	15	15	25	15	25	**120**
11	(England) Alison Waters	5	-	15	25	25	25	25	**115**
12	(Australia) Kasey Brown	6	15	10	15	25	25	15	**105**
13	(New Zealand) Joelle King	5	10	25	-	40	15	15	**105**
14	(Australia) Rachael Grinham	6	25	15	10	15	25	10	**100**
15	(India) Dipika Pallikal	5	25	15	15	-	15	15	**85**
16	(Australia) Donna Urquhart	6	15	15	15	15	10	10	**80**

Bold – The first eight players present for the final

Final tournament	Country	Location	Prize money	Date	2012 World Series Champion
WSA World Series Finals 2012	England	Queen's Club, London	$50,000	January 2013	(Malaysia) **Nicol David**

== See also ==
- PSA World Series 2012
- WSA World Tour 2012
- Official Women's Squash World Ranking
