= Women's United States Open (squash) 2012 =

US Open 2012
- 13th WSA U.S. Open

Details
- Event name: Delaware Investments United States Open 2012
- Location: (United States) Philadelphia, Pennsylvania
- Venue: Daskalakis Athletic Center
- Website www.usopensquash.com/philadelphia/

Women's Winner
- Category: World Series
- Prize money: $70,000
- Year: World Tour 2012

The Women's United States Squash Open 2012 is the women's edition of the 2012 United States Open (squash), which is a WSA World Series event Gold (prize money: $70 000). The event took place at the Daskalakis Athletic Center in Philadelphia, Pennsylvania in the United States from the 7th of October to the 12 October. Nicol David won her first US Open trophy, beating Raneem El Weleily in the final.

== Prize money and ranking points ==
For 2012, the prize purse was $70,000. The prize money and points breakdown is as follows:

Prize money US Open (2012)
Event	W	F	SF	QF	1R
Points (WSA)	3360	2310	1365	735	365,5
Prize money	$11,400	$7,800	$5,100	$3,150	$1,800

== Seeds ==
1. (Malaysia) Nicol David (champion)
2. (Egypt) Raneem El Weleily (final)
3. (England) Jenny Duncalf (quarterfinals)
4. (England) Laura Massaro (semifinals)
5. (Republic of Ireland) Madeline Perry (quarterfinals)
6. (Hong Kong) Annie Au (first round)
7. (Egypt) Nour El Sherbini (first round)
8. (Netherlands) Natalie Grinham (first round)

== Draw and results ==
First round
1	(Malaysia) Nicol David	12	11	11
Q	(France) Camille Serme	10	6	5
8	(Netherlands) Natalie Grinham	10	11	11	5	7
Q	(England) Alison Waters	11	5	8	11	11
3	(England) Jenny Duncalf	11	11	11
(Australia) Rachael Grinham	5	8	4
7	(Egypt) Nour El Sherbini	10	6	5
Q	(New Zealand) Joelle King	12	11	11
Q	(Australia) Donna Urquhart	5	4	11	2
5	(Republic of Ireland) Madeline Perry	11	11	7	11
WC	(United States) Kristen Lange	0	3	4
4	(England) Laura Massaro	11	11	11
(Australia) Kasey Brown	11	11	11
6	(Hong Kong) Annie Au	10	8	9
(Malaysia) Low Wee Wern	8	11	8	5
2	(Egypt) Raneem El Weleily	11	5	11	11

* Quarter finals **
1	(Malaysia) Nicol David	11	11	11
Q	(England) Alison Waters	5	7	9
3	(England) Jenny Duncalf	11	4	3	11	5
Q	(New Zealand) Joelle King	8	11	11	8	11
5	(Republic of Ireland) Madeline Perry	6	9	7
4	(England) Laura Massaro	11	11	11
(Australia) Kasey Brown	8	13	10	9
2	(Egypt) Raneem El Weleily	11	11	12	11

Semi finals *
1	(Malaysia) Nicol David	11	11	5	8	11
Q	(New Zealand) Joelle King	8	6	11	11	7
4	(England) Laura Massaro	11	8	9	12	4
2	(Egypt) Raneem El Weleily	7	11	11	10	11

Final
1	(Malaysia) Nicol David *	14	8	11	11
2	(Egypt) Raneem El Weleily	12	11	7	7

== See also ==
- United States Open (squash)
- WSA World Series 2012
- Men's United States Open (squash) 2012

Preceded by Malaysian Open; Malaysia (Kuala Lumpur); 2012	WSA World Series 2012; US Open; United States (Philadelphia); 2012	Succeeded by Hong Kong Open; Hong Kong; 2012
