= Women's Hong Kong squash Open 2012 =

Cathay Pacific Hong Kong Open 2012
- 11th WSA Hong Kong Open

Details
- Event name: Cathay Pacific Sun Hung Kai Financial Hong Kong Open 2012
- Location: Hong Kong
- Venue: Hong Kong Squash Centre - Tsim Sha Tsui
- Website hksquash.org.hk/hkopen2012

Women's Winner
- Category: World Series Gold
- Prize money: $70,000
- Year: World Tour 2012

The Women's Hong Kong squash Open 2012 is the women's edition of the 2012 Hong Kong Open, which is a WSA World Series event Gold (prize money: $70 000). The event take place at the Hong Kong Squash Centre in Hong Kong from 27 November to 2 December. Nicol David won her seventh Hong Kong Open trophy, beating Camille Serme in the final.

== Prize money and ranking points ==
For 2012, the prize purse is $70,000. The prize money and points breakdown is as follows:

Prize money Hong Kong Open (2012)
| Event | W | F | SF | QF | 2R | 1R |
| Points (WSA) | 3360 | 2310 | 1365 | 735 | 365.5 | 210 |
| Prize money | $10,200 | $6,900 | $4,050 | $2,400 | $1,350 | $750 |

== Seeds ==
1. (Malaysia) Nicol David (champion)
2. (England) Laura Massaro (first round)
3. (England) Jenny Duncalf (quarterfinals)
4. (Hong Kong) Annie Au (first round)
5. (Republic of Ireland) Madeline Perry (second round)
6. (England) Alison Waters (quarterfinals)
7. (Malaysia) Low Wee Wern (second round)
8. (Netherlands) Natalie Grinham (semifinals)
9. (Australia) Kasey Brown (quarterfinals)
10. (New Zealand) Joelle King (second round)
11. (France) Camille Serme (final)
12. (India) Dipika Pallikal (second round)
13. (Australia) Rachael Grinham (quarterfinals)
14. (Mexico) Samantha Terán (first round)
15. (Australia) Donna Urquhart (first round)
16. (Hong Kong) Joey Chan (second round)

== Draw and results ==
First round
1 | (Malaysia) Nicol David | 11 | 11 | 11
(England) Sarah Kippax | 2 | 5 | 5
16 | (Hong Kong) Joey Chan | 8 | 11 | 11 | 11
Q | (New Zealand) Kylie Lindsay | 11 | 4 | 7 | 9
5 | (Republic of Ireland) Madeline Perry | 11 | 11 | 11
Q | (New Zealand) Amanda Lan.-Murphy | 6 | 6 | 3
9 | (Australia) Kasey Brown | 11 | 11 | 11
Q | (England) Lauren Briggs | 8 | 2 | 6
3 | (England) Jenny Duncalf | 11 | 11 | 11
(Malaysia) Delia Arnold | 9 | 9 | 9
12 | (India) Dipika Pallikal | 11 | 6 | 1 | 5
WC | (Hong Kong) Liu Tsz-Ling | 7 | 11 | 11 | 11
8 | (Netherlands) Natalie Grinham | 11 | 11 | 11
Q | (Egypt) Heba El Torky | 7 | 5 | 4
14 | (Mexico) Samantha Terán | 12 | 9 | 8 | 11 | 6
Q | (Guyana) Nicolette Fernandes | 10 | 11 | 11 | 5 | 11
(Republic of Ireland) Aisling Blake | 7 | 11 | 11 | 12 | 2
11 | (France) Camille Serme | 11 | 9 | 13 | 10 | 11
Q | (Australia) Melody Francis | 1 | 2 | 1
7 | (Malaysia) Low Wee Wern | 11 | 11 | 11
(United States) Latasha Khan | 7 | 6 | 4
13 | (Australia) Rachael Grinham | 11 | 11 | 11
Q | (India) Joshna Chinappa | 5 | 11 | 6 | 11 | 11
4 | (Hong Kong) Annie Au | 11 | 8 | 11 | 7 | 5
(Denmark) Line Hansen | 11 | 11 | 13
15 | (Australia) Donna Urquhart | 4 | 5 | 11
(England) Emma Beddoes | 4 | 3 | 2
6 | (England) Alison Waters | 11 | 11 | 11
Q | (France) Coline Aumard | 3 | 4 | 3
10 | (New Zealand) Joelle King | 11 | 11 | 11
(Egypt) Omneya Abdel Kawy | 11 | 11 | 11
2 | (England) Laura Massaro | 9 | 9 | 7

Second round
1 | (Malaysia) Nicol David | 11 | 11 | 11
16 | (Hong Kong) Joey Chan | 5 | 5 | 1
5 | (Republic of Ireland) Madeline Perry | 6 | 8 | 15 | 6
9 | (Australia) Kasey Brown | 11 | 11 | 13 | 11
3 | (England) Jenny Duncalf | 11 | 7 | 14 | 11
12 | (India) Dipika Pallikal | 9 | 11 | 12 | 7
8 | (Netherlands) Natalie Grinham | 11 | 7 | 11 | 11
Q | (Guyana) Nicolette Fernandes | 7 | 11 | 6 | 7
11 | (France) Camille Serme | 5 | 12 | 11 | 9
7 | (Malaysia) Low Wee Wern | 11 | 10 | 3 | 7
13 | (Australia) Rachael Grinham | 11 | 10 | 12 | 17
Q | (India) Joshna Chinappa | 4 | 12 | 10 | 15
(Denmark) Line Hansen | 10 | 3 | 11 | 7
6 | (England) Alison Waters | 12 | 11 | 6 | 11
10 | (New Zealand) Joelle King | 8 | 11 | 13 | 8 | 7
(Egypt) Omneya Abdel Kawy | 11 | 3 | 11 | 11 | 11

Quarter finals
1 | (Malaysia) Nicol David | 11 | 11 | 11
9 | (Australia) Kasey Brown | 2 | 4 | 3
3 | (England) Jenny Duncalf | 8 | 11 | 2 | 5
8 | (Netherlands) Natalie Grinham | 11 | 10 | 11 | 11
11 | (France) Camille Serme | 11 | 11 | 12
13 | (Australia) Rachael Grinham | 6 | 7 | 10
6 | (England) Alison Waters | 9 | 11 | 11 | 8 | 9
(Egypt) Omneya Abdel Kawy | 11 | 9 | 6 | 11 | 11

Semi finals
1 | (Malaysia) Nicol David | 11 | 11 | 11
8 | (Netherlands) Natalie Grinham | 8 | 5 | 6
Final
1 | (Malaysia) Nicol David | 11 | 11 | 8 | 11
11 | (France) Camille Serme | 9 | 6 | 11 | 7
11 | (France) Camille Serme | 11 | 4 | 11 | 11 | 11
(Egypt) Omneya Abdel Kawy | 9 | 11 | 7 | 13 | 6

== See also ==
- Hong Kong Open (squash)
- Men's Hong Kong squash Open 2012
- WSA World Series 2012

| Preceded by US Open; United States (Philadelphia); 2012 | WSA World Series 2012; Hong Kong Open; Hong Kong; 2012 | Succeeded by World Open; Cayman Islands (Grand Cayman) 2012 |
