= Women's Malaysian Open Squash Championships 2012 =

Malaysian Open 2012
- 34th WSA Malaysian Open

Details
- Event name: Malaysian Open Squash Championships 2012
- Location: Kuala Lumpur Malaysia
- Venue: National Squash Centre; Bukit Jalil
- Website www.squashsite.co.uk/2009/malaysian2012.htm

Women's Winner
- Category: World Series Gold
- Prize money: $70,000
- Year: World Tour 2012

The Women's Malaysian Open Squash Championships 2012 is the women's edition of the 2012 Malaysian Open Squash Championships, which is a tournament of the WSA World Series event Gold (prize money: $70,000). The event took place in Kuala Lumpur, in Malaysia, from the 12th to 15 September. Raneem El Weleily won her first Malaysian Open trophy, beating Nicol David in the final.

== Prize money and ranking points ==
For 2012, the prize purse was $70,000. The prize money and points breakdown is as follows:

Prize money Malaysian Open (2012)
Event	W	F	SF	QF	2R	1R
Points (WSA)	3360	2310	1365	735	365,5	210
Prize money	$10,200	$6,900	$4,050	$2,400	$1,350	$750

== Seeds ==
1. (Malaysia) Nicol David (final)
2. (Egypt) Raneem El Weleily (champion)
3. (England) Jenny Duncalf (quarterfinals)
4. (England) Laura Massaro (semifinals)
5. (Republic of Ireland) Madeline Perry (second round)
6. (Hong Kong) Annie Au (quarterfinals)
7. (Egypt) Nour El Sherbini (quarterfinals)
8. (Netherlands) Natalie Grinham (second round)
9. (Australia) Rachael Grinham (first round)
10. (Australia) Kasey Brown (second round)
11. (Malaysia) Low Wee Wern (semifinals)
12. (France) Camille Serme (second round)
13. (Mexico) Samantha Terán (first round)
14. (India) Dipika Pallikal (second round)
15. (England) Alison Waters (quarterfinals)
16. (Australia) Donna Urquhart (second round)

== Draw and results ==
First round
1	(Malaysia) Nicol David	11	12	11
Q	(India) Joshna Chinappa	3	10	9
16	(Australia) Donna Urquhart	11	11	11
Q	(Czech Republic) Lucie Fialová	4	6	4
6	(Hong Kong) Annie Au	11	11	11
Q	(Netherlands) M van der Heijden	2	0	4
10	(Australia) Kasey Brown	4	11	11	11
(Egypt) Heba El Torky	11	7	9	6
4	(England) Laura Massaro	11	11	11
Q	(Hong Kong) Tong Tsz-Wing	7	5	1
14	(India) Dipika Pallikal	11	11	12
Q	(New Zealand) Kylie Lindsay	6	6	10
7	(Egypt) Nour El Sherbini	7	1	4
(Switzerland) Gaby Huber	11	11	11
13	(Mexico) Samantha Terán	3	4	11	10
(England) Emily Whitlock	11	11	9	12
Q	(Egypt) Salma Hany	5	3	7
11	(Malaysia) Low Wee Wern	11	11	11
(Malaysia) Delia Arnold	2	5	4
5	(Republic of Ireland) Madeline Perry	11	11	11
(Malaysia) Siti Munirah Jusoh	8	4	4
12	(France) Camille Serme	11	11	11
(Denmark) Line Hansen	4	4	8
3	(England) Jenny Duncalf	11	11	11
Q	(Hong Kong) Liu Tsz-Ling	6	4	2
15	(England) Alison Waters	11	11	11
Q	(Scotland) Lisa Aitken	5	6	3
8	(Netherlands) Natalie Grinham	11	11	11
(Egypt) Omneya Abdel Kawy	11	11	14
9	(Australia) Rachael Grinham	7	7	12
Q	(Malaysia) Vanessa Raj	4	5	3
2	(Egypt) Raneem El Weleily	11	11	11

Second round
1	(Malaysia) Nicol David	11	8	11	11
16	(Australia) Donna Urquhart	6	11	8	7
6	(Hong Kong) Annie Au	11	11	11
10	(Australia) Kasey Brown	7	8	8
4	(England) Laura Massaro
14	(India) Dipika Pallikal
7	(Egypt) Nour El Sherbini	11	5	11	11
(England) Emily Whitlock	7	11	7	8
11	(Malaysia) Low Wee Wern	11	9	11	11
5	(Republic of Ireland) Madeline Perry	3	11	4	8
12	(France) Camille Serme	5	4	7
3	(England) Jenny Duncalf	11	11	11
15	(England) Alison Waters	11	9	12	11
8	(Netherlands) Natalie Grinham	6	11	10	5
(Egypt) Omneya Abdel Kawy	11	9	7	2
2	(Egypt) Raneem El Weleily	6	11	11	11

Quarter finals
1	(Malaysia) Nicol David	6	11	15	11
6	(Hong Kong) Annie Au	11	5	13	5
4	(England) Laura Massaro	11	11	11	11
7	(Egypt) Nour El Sherbini	13	5	7	3
11	(Malaysia) Low Wee Wern	11	11	11
3	(England) Jenny Duncalf	7	5	8
15	(England) Alison Waters	10	11	6	3
2	(Egypt) Raneem El Weleily	11	5	11	11

Semi finals
1	(Malaysia) Nicol David	10	11	11	11
4	(England) Laura Massaro	12	6	7	8
Final
1	(Malaysia) Nicol David	10	13	6	2
2	(Egypt) Raneem El Weleily	12	11	11	11
11	(Malaysia) Low Wee Wern	8	11	9	11	9
2	(Egypt) Raneem El Weleily	11	9	11	9	11

== See also ==
- WSA World Series 2012
- Malaysian Open Squash Championships
- Men's Malaysian Open Squash Championships 2012

Preceded by British Open; England (London); 2012	WSA World Series 2012; Malaysian Open; Malaysia (Kuala Lumpur); 2012	Succeeded by US Open; United States (Philadelphia) 2012
