= China Squash Open 2012 =

2012 squash tournament in China

- 5th WSA China Open

Details
- Event name: Lujiazui Finance City China Squash Open 2012
- Location: Shanghai, China
- Venue: Lujiazui Central Park

Women's Winner
- Category: Gold 50
- Prize money: $55,000
- Year: World Tour 2012

The Lujiazui Finance City China Squash Open 2012 is the women's edition of the 2012 China Squash Open, which is a tournament of the WSA World Tour event International (Prize money: $55,000). The event took place in Shanghai in China from 25 October to 28 October. Low Wee Wern won her second China Squash Open trophy, beating Joelle King in the final.

== Prize money and ranking points ==
For 2012, the prize purse was $55,000. The prize money and points breakdown is as follows:

Prize Money China Squash Open (2012)
Event	W	F	SF	QF	1R
Points (WSA)	2450	1610	980	595	350
Prize money	$9,500	$6,500	$4,250	$2,625	$1,500

== Seeds ==
1. (Egypt) Raneem El Weleily (quarterfinals)
2. (England) Jenny Duncalf (first round)
3. (Hong Kong) Annie Au (quarterfinals)
4. (Australia) Kasey Brown (semifinals)
5. (England) Alison Waters (semifinals)
6. (Malaysia) Low Wee Wern (champion)
7. (New Zealand) Joelle King (final)
8. (France) Camille Serme (first round)

== Draw and results ==
First round
1	(Egypt) Raneem El Weleily
(Mexico) Samantha Terán	wo
5	(England) Alison Waters	11	8	11	9	11
Q	(Hong Kong) Joey Chan	6	11	2	11	4
3	(Hong Kong) Annie Au	11	8	2	11	11
(Australia) Donna Urquhart	4	11	11	9	7
7	(New Zealand) Joelle King	11	12	11
Q	(England) Sarah Kippax	7	10	7
Q	(Republic of Ireland) Aisling Blake	11	7	7	11	12
8	(France) Camille Serme	9	11	11	1	10
WC	(China) Li Dongjin	11	4	4	3
4	(Australia) Kasey Brown	9	11	11	11
(Australia) Rachael Grinham	11	9	3	8
6	(Malaysia) Low Wee Wern	7	11	11	11
Q	(Egypt) Omneya Abdel Kawy	13	11	9	11
2	(England) Jenny Duncalf	11	8	11	6

Quarter finals
1	(Egypt) Raneem El Weleily	11	4	1	11	11
5	(England) Alison Waters	7	11	11	8	13
3	(Hong Kong) Annie Au	4	6	11	9
7	(New Zealand) Joelle King	11	11	8	11
Q	(Republic of Ireland) Aisling Blake	9	7	5
4	(Australia) Kasey Brown	11	11	11
6	(Malaysia) Low Wee Wern	8	11	5	11	11
Q	(Egypt) Omneya Abdel Kawy	11	9	11	6	9

Semi finals
5	(England) Alison Waters	10	4	6
7	(New Zealand) Joelle King	12	11	11
4	(Australia) Kasey Brown	10	7	5
6	(Malaysia) Low Wee Wern	12	11	11

Final
7	(New Zealand) Joelle King	11	4	11	3	9
6	(Malaysia) Low Wee Wern	6	11	3	11	11

== See also ==
- WSA World Tour 2012
- China Squash Open
