= Carol Weymuller Open 2012 =

- 37th Carol Weymuller Open

Details
- Event name: Carol Weymuller Open 2012
- Location: Brooklyn, New York, United States
- Venue: The Heights Casino

Women's Winner
- Category: Gold 50
- Prize money: $50,000
- Year: World Tour 2012

The Carol Weymuller Open 2012 is the women's edition of the 2012 Carol Weymuller Open, which is a tournament of the WSA World Tour event Gold (Prize money: $50,000). The event took place at The Heights Casino in Brooklyn, New York in the United States from 27 September to 30 September. Laura Massaro won her first Carol Weymuller Open trophy, beating Raneem El Weleily in the final.

== Prize money and ranking points ==
For 2012, the prize purse was $50,000. The prize money and points breakdown is as follows:

Prize Money Carol Weymuller Open (2012)
Event	W	F	SF	QF	1R
Points (WSA)	2450	1610	980	595	350
Prize money	$8,550	$5,850	$3,825	$2,365	$1,350

== Seeds ==
1. (Malaysia) Nicol David (quarterfinals)
2. (Egypt) Raneem El Weleily (final)
3. (England) Jenny Duncalf (quarterfinals)
4. (England) Laura Massaro (champion)
5. (Republic of Ireland) Madeline Perry (first round)
6. (Hong Kong) Annie Au (quarterfinals)
7. (Egypt) Nour El Sherbini (semifinals)
8. (Australia) Rachael Grinham (first round)

== Draw and results ==
First round
1	(Malaysia) Nicol David	11	11	11
(Australia) Kasey Brown	9	5	6
5	(Republic of Ireland) Madeline Perry	7	11	7	2
Q	(England) Alison Waters	11	8	11	11
4	(England) Laura Massaro	7	4	11	11	11
(Malaysia) Low Wee Wern	11	11	2	3	8
6	(Hong Kong) Annie Au	3	11	9	11	11
Q	(Australia) Donna Urquhart	11	4	11	3	3
(France) Camille Serme	11	8	11	4	12
7	(Egypt) Nour El Sherbini	4	11	7	11	14
Q	(India) Dipika Pallikal	9	6	6
3	(England) Jenny Duncalf	11	11	11
(New Zealand) Joelle King	11	11	11
8	(Australia) Rachael Grinham	6	5	7
Q	(New Zealand) Jaclyn Hawkes	9	9	3
2	(Egypt) Raneem El Weleily	11	11	11

Quarter finals
1	(Malaysia) Nicol David	9	11	3	7
Q	(England) Alison Waters	11	5	11	11
4	(England) Laura Massaro	9	11	11	11
6	(Hong Kong) Annie Au	11	4	3	6
7	(Egypt) Nour El Sherbini	11	11	11
3	(England) Jenny Duncalf	6	9	6
(New Zealand) Joelle King	11	12	3	9	11
2	(Egypt) Raneem El Weleily	3	10	11	11	13

Semi finals
Q	(England) Alison Waters	7	7	4
4	(England) Laura Massaro	11	11	11
7	(Egypt) Nour El Sherbini	6	9	11	9
2	(Egypt) Raneem El Weleily	11	11	9	11

Final
4	(England) Laura Massaro	11	11	11
2	(Egypt) Raneem El Weleily	8	4	5

== See also ==
- WSA World Tour 2012
- Carol Weymuller Open
