= 2012 Women's World Open Squash Championship =

Women's World Open 2012
- 29th WSA World Squash Championship
- Location: (Cayman Islands) Grand Cayman, Cayman Island
- Date(s): 16–21 December 2012
- Website www.worldopensquash.com

WSA World Tour
- Category: WSA World Open
- Prize money: $188,000

Results
- Champion: (Malaysia) Nicol David
- Runner-up: (England) Laura Massaro
- Semi-finalists: (Egypt) Raneem El Weleily (England) Jenny Duncalf

The 2012 Women's World Open Squash Championship is the women's edition of the 2012 World Open, which serves as the individual world championship for squash players. The event took place in Grand Cayman in Cayman Island from 16 to 21 December. Nicol David won her seventh World Open title, beating Laura Massaro in the final.

== Prize money and ranking points ==
For 2012, the prize purse was $188,000. The prize money and points breakdown is as follows:

Prize Money World Open (2012)
Event	W	F	SF	QF	2R	1R
Points (WSA)	5300	3630	2150	1150	575	330
Prize money	$28,050	$18,975	$11,140	$6,600	$3,710	$2,060

== Seeds ==
1. (Malaysia) Nicol David (champion)
2. (England) Laura Massaro (final)
3. (Egypt) Raneem El Weleily (semifinals)
4. (England) Alison Waters (quarterfinals)
5. (New Zealand) Joelle King (second round)
6. (England) Jenny Duncalf (semifinals)
7. (Malaysia) Low Wee Wern (quarterfinals)
8. (Egypt) Nour El Sherbini (second round)
9. (Hong Kong) Annie Au (second round)
10. (Republic of Ireland) Madeline Perry (quarterfinals)
11. (Netherlands) Natalie Grinham (quarterfinals)
12. (Australia) Kasey Brown (second round)
13. (India) Dipika Pallikal (second round)
14. (France) Camille Serme (second round)
15. (Mexico) Samantha Terán (second round)
16. (Australia) Rachael Grinham (first round)

== Draw and results ==
First round
1	(Malaysia) Nicol David	11	11	11
(Egypt) Omneya Abdel Kawy	8	5	5
9	(Hong Kong) Annie Au	11	11	10	11
(Denmark) Line Hansen	2	5	12	8
8	(Egypt) Nour El Sherbini	11	11	11
Q	(Canada) Samantha Cornett	6	5	5
10	(Republic of Ireland) Madeline Perry	11	13	3	11
(Egypt) Nour El Tayeb	6	11	11	2
4	(England) Alison Waters	11	11	11
WC	(Cayman Islands) Marlene West	1	4	3
15	(Mexico) Samantha Terán	11	11	11
Q	(England) Lauren Briggs	7	3	7
6	(England) Jenny Duncalf	11	1	11	11
Q	(England) Sarah-Jane Perry	9	11	5	8
14	(France) Camille Serme	11	10	11	11
Q	(England) Emma Beddoes	8	12	7	6
Q	(United States) Latasha Khan	5	3	4
12	(Australia) Kasey Brown	11	11	11
(England) Sarah Kippax	11	8	7	5
7	(Malaysia) Low Wee Wern	7	11	11	11
Q	(Guyana) Nicolette Fernandes	3	6	12	11	11
16	(Australia) Rachael Grinham	11	11	10	5	9
Q	(Colombia) Catalina Peláez	6	5	5
3	(England) Laura Massaro	11	11	11
(Australia) Donna Urquhart	11	4	8	9
11	(Netherlands) Natalie Grinham	8	11	11	11
(Hong Kong) Joey Chan	0	6	5
5	(New Zealand) Joelle King	11	11	11
Q	(Malaysia) Delia Arnold	11	9	9
13	(India) Dipika Pallikal	13	11	11
(Republic of Ireland) Aisling Blake	9	11	4	8
2	(Egypt) Raneem El Weleily	11	5	11	11

Second round
1	(Malaysia) Nicol David	11	11	11
9	(Hong Kong) Annie Au	3	2	3
8	(Egypt) Nour El Sherbini	2	9	9
10	(Republic of Ireland) Madeline Perry	11	11	11
4	(England) Alison Waters	11	12	11
15	(Mexico) Samantha Terán	5	10	3
6	(England) Jenny Duncalf	12	11	8	11
14	(France) Camille Serme	10	6	11	8
12	(Australia) Kasey Brown	5	8	10
7	(Malaysia) Low Wee Wern	11	11	12
Q	(Guyana) Nicolette Fernandes	9	9	7
3	(England) Laura Massaro	11	11	11
11	(Netherlands) Natalie Grinham	8	11	8	11	11
5	(New Zealand) Joelle King	11	3	11	8	7
13	(India) Dipika Pallikal	11	9	6	5
2	(Egypt) Raneem El Weleily	7	11	11	11

Quarter finals
1	(Malaysia) Nicol David	11	11	9	11
10	(Republic of Ireland) Madeline Perry	3	7	11	3
4	(England) Alison Waters	11	19	5	4	9
6	(England) Jenny Duncalf	7	17	11	11	11
7	(Malaysia) Low Wee Wern	11	4	5	5
3	(England) Laura Massaro	8	11	11	11
11	(Netherlands) Natalie Grinham	9	9	7
2	(Egypt) Raneem El Weleily	11	11	11

Semi finals
1	(Malaysia) Nicol David *	11	11	11
6	(England) Jenny Duncalf	7	4	2
Final
1	(Malaysia) Nicol David *	11	11	11
3	(England) Laura Massaro	6	8	6
3	(England) Laura Massaro *	5	11	12	11	13
2	(Egypt) Raneem El Weleily	11	9	14	4	11

== See also ==
- World Open
- 2012 Men's World Open Squash Championship
- 2012 Women's World Team Squash Championships

Preceded by Netherlands (Rotterdam); 2011	WSA World Open; Cayman Island (Grand Cayman); 2012	Succeeded by Malaysia (Penang); 2013
Preceded by Hong Kong Open; Hong Kong; 2012	WSA World Series 2012; World Open; Cayman Island (Grand Cayman); 2012	Succeeded by Kuala Lumpur Open; Malaysia (Kuala Lumpur) 2013
