= Women's Kuala Lumpur Open Squash Championships 2012 =

Kuala Lumpur Open Squash Championships 2012

Details
- Event name: CIMB Kuala Lumpur Nicol David Open Squash Championships 2012
- Location: Kuala Lumpur Malaysia
- Venue: Berjaya Times Square
- Website www.squashsite.co.uk/2009/klopen2012.htm

Women's Winner
- Category: World Series Gold
- Prize money: $70,000
- Year: World Tour 2012

The Women's CIMB Kuala Lumpur Nicol David Open Squash Championships 2012 is the women's edition of the 2012 Kuala Lumpur Open Squash Championships, which is a tournament of the WSA World Series event Gold (prize money: $70,000). The event took place in Kuala Lumpur in Malaysia from 26 March to 31 March. Nicol David won her seventh CIMB Kuala Lumpur Open trophy, beating Annie Au in the final.

== Prize money and ranking points ==
For 2012, the prize purse was $70,000. The prize money and points breakdown is as follows:

Prize money CIMB Kuala Lumpur Open (2012)
Event	W	F	SF	QF	1R
Points (WSA)	3360	2310	1365	735	365,5
Prize money	$11,400	$7,800	$5,100	$3,150	$1,800

== Seeds ==
1. (Malaysia) Nicol David (champion)
2. (England) Jenny Duncalf (first round)
3. (England) Laura Massaro (quarterfinals)
4. (Republic of Ireland) Madeline Perry (quarterfinals)
5. (Egypt) Raneem El Weleily (semifinals)
6. (Australia) Rachael Grinham (quarterfinals)
7. (Netherlands) Natalie Grinham (first round)
8. (Australia) Kasey Brown (first round)

== Draw and results ==
First round
1	(Malaysia) Nicol David	11	11	11
Q	(Australia) Donna Urquhart	5	5	6
8	(Australia) Kasey Brown	6	6	9
Q	(India) Dipika Pallikal	11	11	11
4	(Republic of Ireland) Madeline Perry	11	11	1	12
(France) Camille Serme	9	1	11	10
5	(Egypt) Raneem El Weleily	11	11	11
(Malaysia) Low Wee Wern	9	6	5
(Hong Kong) Annie Au	11	12	11	11
7	(Netherlands) Natalie Grinham	9	14	6	6
(Mexico) Samantha Terán	7	5	6
3	(England) Laura Massaro	11	11	11
Q	(Egypt) Heba El Torky	11	11	9	5	10
6	(Australia) Rachael Grinham	8	5	11	11	12
Q	(Egypt) Nour El Sherbini	12	9	11	9	11
2	(England) Jenny Duncalf	10	11	5	11	9

Quarter finals
1	(Malaysia) Nicol David	11	11	11
Q	(India) Dipika Pallikal	5	2	6
4	(Republic of Ireland) Madeline Perry	11	6	2
5	(Egypt) Raneem El Weleily	13	11	11
(Hong Kong) Annie Au	11	7	11	5	11
3	(England) Laura Massaro	8	11	5	11	9
6	(Australia) Rachael Grinham	8	11	6	8
Q	(Egypt) Nour El Sherbini	11	6	11	11

Semi finals
1	(Malaysia) Nicol David	15	12	11	11
5	(Egypt) Raneem El Weleily	13	14	6	7
(Hong Kong) Annie Au	9	11	11	11
Q	(Egypt) Nour El Sherbini	11	9	8	8

Final
1	(Malaysia) Nicol David	11	12	11
(Hong Kong) Annie Au	4	10	9

== See also ==
- Men's Kuala Lumpur Open Squash Championships 2012
- WSA World Series 2012
- Kuala Lumpur Open Squash Championships

Preceded by Hong Kong Open; Hong Kong; 2011	WSA World Series 2012; Kuala Lumpur Open; Malaysia (Kuala Lumpur); 2012	Succeeded by British Open; England (London) 2012
