= 2012 Women's Australian Open (squash) =

Australian Open 2012
- 33rd WSA Australian Open

Details
- Event name: Australian Open 2012
- Location: Canberra Australia
- Venue: National Convention Centre
- Website www.australiansquashopen.com

Women's PSA World Tour
- Category: Gold 50
- Prize money: $50,000
- Year: World Tour 2012

The Women's Australian Open 2012 is the women' edition of the 2012 Australian Open, which is a tournament of the WSA World Tour event Gold (Prize money: $50,000). The event took place in Canberra in Australia from 13 to 18 August. Nicol David won her second Australian Open trophy, beating Laura Massaro in the final.

== Prize money and ranking points ==
For 2012, the prize purse was $50,000. The prize money and points breakdown is as follows:

Prize Money Australian Open (2012)
Event	W	F	SF	QF	2R	1R
Points (WSA)	2450	1610	980	595	350	175
Prize money	$7,650	$5,175	$3,040	$1,800	$1,010	$565

== Seeds ==
1. (Malaysia) Nicol David (champion)
2. (England) Jenny Duncalf (second round)
3. (England) Laura Massaro (final)
4. (Republic of Ireland) Madeline Perry (semifinals)
5. (Hong Kong) Annie Au (second round)
6. (France) Camille Serme (second round)
7. (Australia) Rachael Grinham (second round)
8. (Australia) Kasey Brown (quarterfinals)
9. (New Zealand) Joelle King (second round)
10. (Malaysia) Low Wee Wern (second round)
11. (India) Dipika Pallikal (semifinals)
12. (Australia) Donna Urquhart (quarterfinals)
13. (New Zealand) Jaclyn Hawkes (first round)
14. (Hong Kong) Joey Chan (first round)
15. (Malaysia) Delia Arnold (first round)
16. (England) Emma Beddoes (second round)

== Draw and results ==
First round
1	(Malaysia) Nicol David	11	8	11	11
Q	(Wales) Tesni Evans	3	11	4	8
10	(Malaysia) Low Wee Wern	11	11	11
(Hong Kong) Liu Tsz-Ling	3	2	8
5	(Hong Kong) Annie Au	11	11	11
Q	(Scotland) Lisa Aitken	5	2	2
15	(Malaysia) Delia Arnold	8	6	3
(England) Alison Waters	11	11	11
4	(Republic of Ireland) Madeline Perry	11	11	11
(Malaysia) Siti Munirah Jusoh	3	9	1
16	(England) Emma Beddoes	8	11	8	11	11
Q	(Australia) Sarah Cardwell	11	2	11	4	3
8	(Australia) Kasey Brown	11	11	11
(Denmark) Line Hansen	6	4	2
9	(New Zealand) Joelle King	11	11	3	11
Q	(Czech Republic) Olga Ertlová	7	7	11	6
Q	(New Zealand) Kylie Lindsay	3	7	6
12	(Australia) Donna Urquhart	11	11	11
(South Africa) Siyoli Waters	7	11	9
7	(Australia) Rachael Grinham	11	13	11
(England) Emily Whitlock	9	11	4	11	11
13	(New Zealand) Jaclyn Hawkes	11	6	11	9	9
Q	(Brazil) Thaisa Serafini	1	5	8
3	(England) Laura Massaro	11	11	11
WC	(Australia) Christine Nunn	5	2	5
11	(India) Dipika Pallikal	11	11	11
Q	(England) Am. Landers-Murphy	4	7	6
6	(France) Camille Serme	11	11	11
(United States) Amanda Sobhy	11	11	11
14	(Hong Kong) Joey Chan	4	6	3
Q	(India) Joshna Chinappa	7	7	11
2	(England) Jenny Duncalf	11	11	13

Second round
1	(Malaysia) Nicol David	11	11	11
10	(Malaysia) Low Wee Wern	4	1	6
5	(Hong Kong) Annie Au	7	6	8
(England) Alison Waters	11	11	11
4	(Republic of Ireland) Madeline Perry	11	13	11
16	(England) Emma Beddoes	8	11	2
8	(Australia) Kasey Brown	7	11	11	11
9	(New Zealand) Joelle King	11	4	6	9
12	(Australia) Donna Urquhart	11	11	6	11
7	(Australia) Rachael Grinham	5	7	11	4
(England) Emily Whitlock	12	8	9
3	(England) Laura Massaro	13	11	11
11	(India) Dipika Pallikal	3	11	11	11
6	(France) Camille Serme	11	9	9	6
(United States) Amanda Sobhy	11	10	11	11
2	(England) Jenny Duncalf	7	12	7	6

Quarter finals
1	(Malaysia) Nicol David	10	11	11	15
(England) Alison Waters	12	1	7	13
4	(Republic of Ireland) Madeline Perry	11	11	11
8	(Australia) Kasey Brown	4	5	6
12	(Australia) Donna Urquhart	wo
3	(England) Laura Massaro
11	(India) Dipika Pallikal	11	11	11
(United States) Amanda Sobhy	5	7	10

Semi finals
1	(Malaysia) Nicol David	11	11	11
4	(Republic of Ireland) Madeline Perry	7	4	5
Final
1	(Malaysia) Nicol David	17	11	11
3	(England) Laura Massaro	15	2	6
3	(England) Laura Massaro	11	7	13	3	11
11	(India) Dipika Pallikal	7	11	11	11	9

== See also ==
- WSA World Tour 2012
- Australian Open (squash)
- 2012 Men's Australian Open (squash)
