= 2007 Women's World Open Squash Championship =

Women's World Open 2007
- 24th WISPA World Squash Championship
- Location: Madrid, Spain
- Date(s): October 23–27, 2007
- Website www.squashsite.co.uk/womens_world_open_2007.htm

WISPA World Tour
- Category: WISPA World Open
- Prize money: $114,000

Results
- Champion: (Australia) Rachael Grinham
- Runner-up: (Australia) Natalie Grinham
- Semi-finalists: (United States) Natalie Grainger (England) Tania Bailey

The 2007 Women's World Open Squash Championship is the women's edition of the 2007 World Open, which serves as the individual world championship for squash players. The event was held outsite the Royal Palace of Madrid in Madrid, Spain from 23 to 27 October 2007. Rachael Grinham defeated sister Natalie in the final.

== Ranking points ==
In 2007, the points breakdown were as follows:

World Open (2007)
Event	W	F	SF	QF	2R	1R
Points (WISPA)	4800	3300	1950	1050	525	300

== Seeds ==
1. (Malaysia) Nicol David (second round)
2. (Australia) Natalie Grinham (final)
3. (Australia) Rachael Grinham (champion)
4. (England) Tania Bailey (semifinals)
5. (United States) Natalie Grainger (semifinals)
6. (England) Vicky Botwright (second round)
7. (Egypt) Omneya Abdel Kawy (quarterfinals)
8. (Netherlands) Vanessa Atkinson (quarterfinals)
9. (England) Jenny Duncalf (quarterfinals)
10. (New Zealand) Shelley Kitchen (quarterfinals)
11. (England) Laura Lengthorn-Massaro (second round)
12. (England) Alison Waters (second round)
13. (Egypt) Engy Kheirallah (second round)
14. (Hong Kong) Rebecca Chiu (second round)
15. (Australia) Kasey Brown (second round)
16. (Netherlands) Annelize Naudé (second round)

== Draw and results ==
First round
1	(Malaysia) N David	9	9	9
(France) I Stoehr	7	3	0
10	(New Zealand) S Kitchen	9	9	9
Q	(England) L Briggs	2	4	2
5	(United States) N Grainger	9	9	9
(Mexico) S Terán	6	0	3
13	(Egypt) E Kheirallah	9	9	9
Q	(Canada) R Reta	3	4	3
3	(Australia) R Grinham	9	10	9
Q	(New Zealand) L Crome	3	8	5
12	(England) A Waters	9	9	9
Q	(England) S Pierrepont	0	3	3
6	(England) V Botwright	9	9	9
(Malaysia) S Wee	2	5	2
9	(England) J Duncalf	6	9	9	9
(United States) L Khan	9	3	1	0
Q	(Republic of Ireland) A Blake	2	6	2
15	(Australia) K Brown	9	9	9
Q	(Spain) A A Riaza	0	0	1
8	(Netherlands) V Atkinson	9	9	9
Q	(Italy) M Manetta	4	3	7
11	(England) L L-Massaro	9	9	9
(New Zealand) J Hawkes	4	1	9	9
4	(England) T Bailey	9	9	6	10
(Egypt) R E Weleily	3	4	9	9	3
16	(Netherlands) A Naude	9	9	7	5	9
Q	(Netherlands) O Noom	4	2	3
7	(Egypt) O A Kawy	9	9	9
Q	(Denmark) L Hansen	5	6	2
14	(Hong Kong) R Chiu	9	9	9
(England) D Lloyd-Walter	3	5	5
2	(Australia) N Grinham	9	9	9

Second round
1	(Malaysia) N David	0	1	9	9	6
10	(New Zealand) S Kitchen	9	9	2	3	9
5	(United States) N Grainger	9	9	9
13	(Egypt) E Kheirallah	2	0	0
3	(Australia) R Grinham	4	9	9	9
12	(England) A Waters	9	6	4	5
6	(England) V Botwright	4	6	3	r
9	(England) J Duncalf	9	9	5
15	(Australia) K Brown	5	0	0
8	(Netherlands) V Atkinson	9	9	9
(England) L L-Massaro	10	5	9	3
4	(England) T Bailey	9	9	10	9
16	(Netherlands) A Naude	9	8	5	4
7	(Egypt) O A Kawy	4	10	9	9
14	(Hong Kong) R Chiu	5	5	4
2	(Australia) N Grinham	9	9	9

Quarter finals
13	(New Zealand) S Kitchen	2	1	0
5	(United States) N Grainger	9	9	9
3	(Australia) R Grinham	9	9	9
9	(England) J Duncalf	3	2	1
8	(Netherlands) V Atkinson	0	9	9	4
4	(England) T Bailey	9	10	7	9
7	(Egypt) O A Kawy	9	2	0	4
2	(Australia) N Grinham	5	9	9	9

Semi finals
5	(United States) N Grainger	9	6	6	3
3	(Australia) R Grinham	5	9	9	9
Final
3	(Australia) R Grinham	9	10	9
2	(Australia) N Grinham	4	8	2
4	(England) T Bailey	2	5	7
2	(Australia) N Grinham	9	9	9

== See also ==
- World Open
- 2007 Men's World Open Squash Championship

Preceded by Northern Ireland (Belfast); 2006	WISPA World Open; Spain (Madrid); 2007	Succeeded by England (Manchester) 2008
