= Women's China Squash Open 2016 =

China Squash Open 2016
- 8th Women's China Open

Details
- Event name: Stars on the Bund China Open 2016
- Location: Shanghai, China
- Venue: The Peninsula Shanghai
- Website www.squashsite.co.uk/2009/chinaopen2016.htm

Women's Winner
- Category: International 70
- Prize money: $70,000
- Year: World Tour 2016

The Women's China Squash Open 2016 is the women's edition of the 2016 China Squash Open, which is a tournament of the PSA World Tour event International (prize money: 70 000 $). The event took place in Shanghai in China from 1 to 4 September. Laura Massaro won her first China Squash Open trophy, beating Nouran Gohar in the final.

== Prize money and ranking points ==
For 2016, the prize purse was $70,000. The prize money and points breakdown is as follows:

Prize money China Squash Open (2016)
Event	W	F	SF	QF	1R
Points (PSA)	1225	805	490	300	175
Prize money	$12,350	$8,450	$5,525	$3,415	$1,950

== Seeds ==
1. (England) Laura Massaro (champion)
2. (Egypt) Raneem El Weleily (semifinals)
3. (Egypt) Nouran Gohar (final)
4. (New Zealand) Joelle King (semifinals)
5. (India) Joshna Chinappa (quarterfinals)
6. (Hong Kong) Annie Au (first round)
7. (England) Sarah-Jane Perry (quarterfinals)
8. (England) Alison Waters (quarterfinals)

== Draw and results ==
First round
1	(England) Laura Massaro	13	11	11
Q	(Hong Kong) Joey Chan	11	9	9
Q	(Egypt) Heba El Torky	11	8	4	7
7	(India) Joshna Chinappa	8	11	11	11
5	(England) Sarah-Jane Perry	11	7	11	11
(England) Emily Whitlock	0	11	9	7
(Malaysia) Delia Arnold	3	11	5	5
4	(New Zealand) Joelle King	11	7	11	11
3	(Egypt) Nouran Gohar	11	11	11
Q	(India) Dipika Pallikal	5	5	6
Q	(Egypt) Salma Hany Ibrahim	11	11	11
6	(Hong Kong) Annie Au	6	6	3
8	(England) Alison Waters	11	6	11	8	11
(England) Victoria Lust	4	11	8	11	6
WC	(Hong Kong) Li Dongjin	3	6	4
2	(Egypt) Raneem El Weleily	11	11	11

Quarter finals
1	(England) Laura Massaro	11	11	11
5	(India) Joshna Chinappa	7	5	6
7	(England) Sarah-Jane Perry	8	11	9	11
4	(New Zealand) Joelle King	11	8	11	13
3	(Egypt) Nouran Gohar	9	11	12	11
Q	(Egypt) Salma Hany Ibrahim	11	5	10	8
8	(England) Alison Waters	11	11	9	4
2	(Egypt) Raneem El Weleily	9	13	11	11

Semi finals
1	(England) Laura Massaro	17	7	11	13
4	(New Zealand) Joelle King	15	11	7	11
3	(Egypt) Nouran Gohar	11	11	5	11
2	(Egypt) Raneem El Weleily	8	8	11	9

Final
1	(England) Laura Massaro	11	11	11
3	(Egypt) Nouran Gohar	9	5	3

== See also ==
- 2016 PSA World Tour
- China Squash Open
- Men's China Squash Open 2016
