= 2012 WSA World Series Finals =

WSA World Series Finals 2012
- 2nd WSA World Series Finals

Details
- Event name: WSA World Series Finals 2012
- Location: London England
- Venue: Queen's Club
- Website www.worldseriesfinals.com

Women's Winner
- Category: WSA World Series Finals
- Prize money: $55,000
- Year: World Series 2012

The 2012 WSA World Series Finals is the women's edition of the 2012 WSA World Series Finals (Prize money : $50 000). The event took place at the Queen's Club in London in England between 2–6 January 2013. Nicol David won her second WSA World Series Finals trophy, beating Laura Massaro in the final.

== Seeds ==
1. (Malaysia) Nicol David (champion)
2. (Egypt) Raneem El Weleily (first round)
3. (England) Laura Massaro (final)
4. (Egypt) Nour El Sherbini (first round)
5. (Hong Kong) Annie Au (first round)
6. (England) Jenny Duncalf (semifinals)
7. (France) Camille Serme (semifinals)
8. (Netherlands) Natalie Grinham (first round)

== Group stage results ==
=== Pool A ===
(Malaysia) Nicol David	11	11	-	7	4	(Hong Kong) Annie Au
(England) Laura Massaro	11	11	-	8	8	(Netherlands) Natalie Grinham

(Malaysia) Nicol David	10	9	-	12	11	(England) Laura Massaro
(Hong Kong) Annie Au	12	4	-	14	11	(Netherlands) Natalie Grinham

(Malaysia) Nicol David	11	11		-	4	8		(Netherlands) Natalie Grinham
(England) Laura Massaro	5	11	6	-	11	7	11	(Hong Kong) Annie Au

Rank	Player	Match	Win	Low	Points
1	(England) Laura Massaro	3	2	1	4
2	(Malaysia) Nicol David	3	2	1	4
3	(Netherlands) Natalie Grinham	3	1	2	2
4	(Hong Kong) Annie Au	3	1	2	2

=== Pool B ===
(Egypt) Raneem El Weleily	12	8	8	-	10	11	11	(England) Jenny Duncalf
(Egypt) Nour El Sherbini	8	10		-	11	12		(France) Camille Serme

(Egypt) Raneem El Weleily	8	8	-	11	11	(Egypt) Nour El Sherbini
(England) Jenny Duncalf	7	7	-	11	11	(France) Camille Serme

(Egypt) Raneem El Weleily	11	11		-	6	8		(France) Camille Serme
(Egypt) Nour El Sherbini	16	11	9	-	18	4	11	(England) Jenny Duncalf

Rank	Player	Match	Win	Low	Points
1	(France) Camille Serme	3	2	1	4
2	(England) Jenny Duncalf	3	2	1	4
3	(Egypt) Nour El Sherbini	3	1	2	2
4	(Egypt) Raneem El Weleily	3	1	2	2

== Draw and results ==
Semi finals
1stA	(England) Laura Massaro	6	11	11
2ndB	(England) Jenny Duncalf	11	8	9
2ndA	(Malaysia) Nicol David	11	11
1stB	(France) Camille Serme	5	8

Final
(England) Laura Massaro	3	2	9
(Malaysia) Nicol David *	11	11	11

== See also ==
- 2012 PSA World Series Finals
- WSA World Tour 2012
- WSA World Series 2012
- WSA World Series Finals
