= China Squash Open =

Details
- Event name: China Squash Open
- Location: Shanghai, China
- Venue: The Peninsula Shanghai
- Website www.squashsite.co.uk/2009/chinaopen2015.htm

Men's Winner
- Category: World Tour Gold
- Prize money: $112,000
- Most recent champion(s): (Egypt) Mohamed El Shorbagy
- Current: Men's China Squash Open 2019

Women's Winner
- Category: World Tour Gold
- Prize money: $112,000
- Most recent champion(s): (Egypt) Raneem El Weleily
- Current: Women's China Squash Open 2019

The China Squash Open is an annual men's and women's squash tournament that takes place in Shanghai in China in September or October. It is part of the PSA World Tour and the WSA World Tour.

== Past Results ==
=== Men's ===
Year	Champion	Runner-up	Score in final
2020	Cancelled due to COVID-19 pandemic in China		
2019	(Egypt) Mohamed El Shorbagy	(Egypt) Ali Farag	11-3, 11-9, 5-11, 11-8
2018	(Egypt) Mohamed Abouelghar	(New Zealand) Paul Coll	11-8, 11-8, 11-8
2017	(Egypt) Ramy Ashour	(Egypt) Ali Farag	11-3, 11-8, 10-12, 2-11, 11-5
2016	(Egypt) Mohamed El Shorbagy	(France) Grégory Gaultier	11-5, 11-3, 11-3
2015	(France) Grégory Gaultier	(Egypt) Marwan El Shorbagy	11-6, 11-2, 11-4
2014	(England) James Willstrop	(England) Peter Barker	11-7, 11-7, 9-11, 10-12, 11-5
2013	No competition		
2012	No competition		
2011	No competition		
2010	(Australia) Aaron Frankcomb	(Denmark) Kristian Frost Olesen	11-8, 11-3, 11-6
2009	(Australia) Ryan Cuskelly	(Australia) Matthew Karwalski	11-9, 11-5, 4-11, 8-11, 11-2
2008	(Italy) Stéphane Galifi	(Hong Kong) Max Lee	11-8, 11-4, 10-12, 11-8

=== Women's ===
Year	Champion	Runner-up	Score in final
2020	Cancelled due to COVID-19 pandemic in China		
2019	(Egypt) Raneem El Weleily	(Egypt) Nour El Tayeb	11-9, 9-11, 11-9, 9-11, 12-10
2018	(Egypt) Raneem El Weleily	(France) Camille Serme	11–5, 8–11, 11–6, 11–5
2017	(Egypt) Nour El Sherbini	(Egypt) Nouran Gohar	12-10, 11-7, 11-9
2016	(England) Laura Massaro	(Egypt) Nouran Gohar	11-9, 11-5, 11-3
2015	(Egypt) Raneem El Weleily	(Egypt) Nouran Gohar	13-11, 11-7, 11-7
2014	(Malaysia) Low Wee Wern	(France) Camille Serme	11-8, 11-6, 8-11, 8-11, 12-10
2013	(Malaysia) Nicol David	(Egypt) Raneem El Weleily	8-11, 6-11, 11-7, 11-7, 11-8
2012	(Malaysia) Low Wee Wern	(New Zealand) Joelle King	6-11, 11-4, 3-11, 11-3, 11-9
2011	(Malaysia) Low Wee Wern	(Malaysia) Delia Arnold	13-15, 11-8, 11-4, 12-10
2010	(Hong Kong) Joey Chan	(Australia) Lisa Camilleri	11-6, 11-13, 11-9, 7-11, 11-8
2009	(Japan) Chinatsu Matsui	(South Korea) Song Sun-mi	11-8, 7-11, 11-4, 11-4
2008	(Egypt) Heba El Torky	(Egypt) Nouran El Torky	11-13, 13-11, 11-8, 6-11, 11-6

== See also ==
- PSA World Tour
- WSA World Tour
