= Vanessa Atkinson =

Dutch squash player

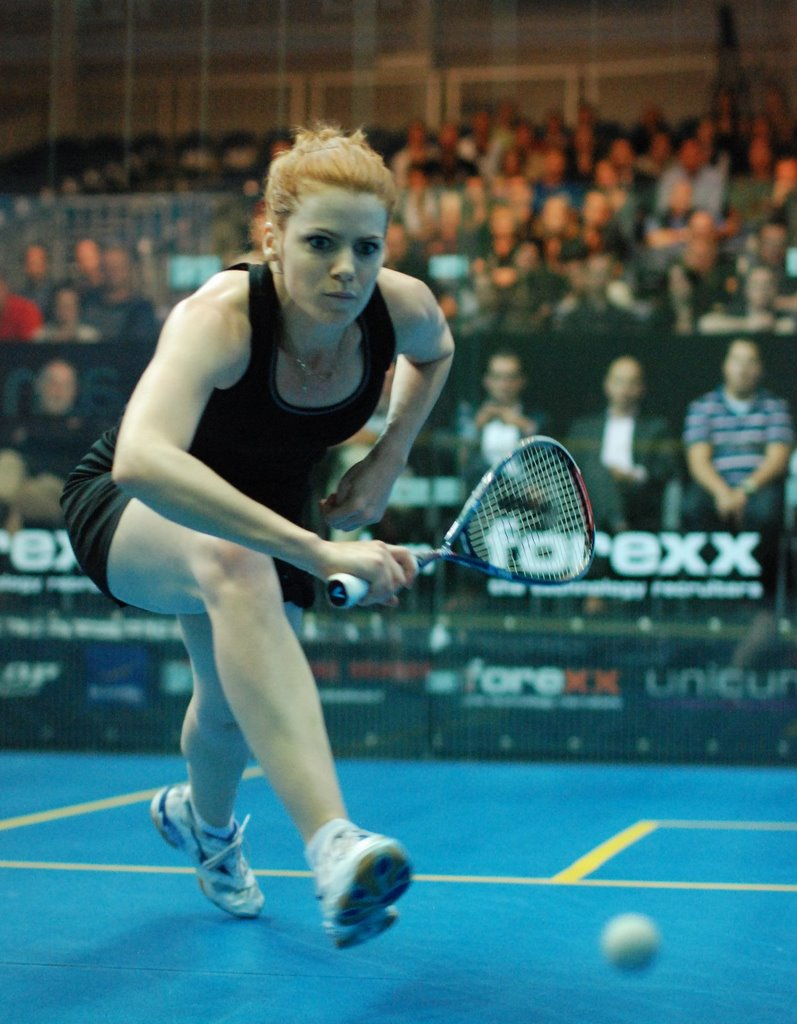
- Atkinson during 2009 Women's World Open

Personal information
- Full name: Vanessa Louise Atkinson
- Born: 10 March 1976 (age 50) Newcastle, England

Sport
- Country: Netherlands
- Handedness: Right Handed
- Turned pro: 1995
- Coached by: Liz Irving
- Retired: 2011
- Racquet used: Karakal

Women's singles
- Highest ranking: No. 1 (December, 2005)
- Title: 25
- Tour final: 42
- World Open: W (2004)
Medal record
Women's squash
Representing Netherlands
World Championships
| Gold medal – first place | 2004 Kuala Lumpur | Singles |
| Bronze medal – third place | 2003 Hong Kong | Singles |
| Bronze medal – third place | 2005 Hong Kong | Singles |
- Updated on 3 December 2019

Vanessa Louise Atkinson (born 10 March 1976 in Newcastle, England) is a former professional squash player from the Netherlands, who won the World Open in 2004 and reached the World No. 1 ranking in December 2005.

Atkinson was born in England, but her family moved to the Netherlands when she was still a child. She began playing squash as a youngster in Dordrecht. She now resides in Harrogate, Yorkshire, with her partner James Willstrop, himself a professional squash player and a former World No. 1.

Atkinson's biggest win came in 2004 when she won the World Open title in Kuala Lumpur by defeating fellow compatriote Natalie Grinham (at that time still representing Australia) with a score of 9–1, 9–1, 9–5 in the final. Atkinson also has won major tournaments in Qatar, New York, Monte Carlo, Malaysia and Ireland.

Atkinson retired from professional play in May 2011.

== World Open ==
=== Finals: 1 (1 title, 0 runner-up) ===
| Outcome | Year | Location | Opponent in the final | Score in the final |
|---|---|---|---|---|
| Winner | 2004 | Kuala Lumpur, Malaysia | (Australia) Natalie Grinham | 9–1, 9–1, 9–5 |

== Major World Series final appearances ==
=== Qatar Classic: 2 finals (2 titles, 0 runner-up) ===
| Outcome | Year | Opponent in the final | Score in the final |
|---|---|---|---|
| Winner | 2004 | (Australia) Rachael Grinham | 9-4, 9-7, 9-6 |
| Winner | 2005 | (England) Vicky Botwright | 9-7, 9-4, 9-2 |

=== Malaysian Open: 2 finals (1 title, 1 runner-up) ===
| Outcome | Year | Opponent in the final | Score in the final |
|---|---|---|---|
| Winner | 2004 | (Malaysia) Nicol David | 9-2, 9-4, 9-0 |
| Runner-up | 2005 | (Malaysia) Nicol David | 3-9, 9-3, 1-9, 9-1, 9-4 |

== See also ==
- Official Women's Squash World Ranking
- List of WISPA number 1 ranked players
- WISPA Awards

Sporting positions
| Preceded by Rachael Grinham; Nicol David | World No. 1 December 2005; April 2006 – July 2006 | Succeeded by Nicol David; Nicol David |
Awards and achievements
| Preceded by — | WISPA Player of the Year; 2004 | Succeeded by Nicol David |
