= Men's China Squash Open 2016 =

China Squash Open 2016
- 6th Men's China Open

Details
- Event name: Stars on the Bund China Open 2016
- Location: Shanghai, China
- Venue: The Peninsula Shanghai
- Website www.squashsite.co.uk/2009/chinaopen2016.htm

Men's Winner
- Category: International 100
- Prize money: $100,000
- Year: World Tour 2016

The Men's China Squash Open 2016 is the men's edition of the 2016 China Squash Open, which is a tournament of the PSA World Tour event International (prize money: 100 000 $). The event took place in Shanghai in China from 1 September to 4 September. Mohamed El Shorbagy won his first China Squash Open trophy, beating Grégory Gaultier in the final.

== Prize money and ranking points ==
For 2016, the prize purse was $100,000. The prize money and points breakdown is as follows:

Prize money China Open (2016)
Event	W	F	SF	QF	1R
Points (PSA)	1750	1150	700	430	250
Prize money	$17,575	$12,025	$7,860	$4,855	$2,775

== Seeds ==
1. (Egypt) Mohamed El Shorbagy (champion)
2. (France) Grégory Gaultier (final)
3. (Egypt) Omar Mosaad (first round)
4. (Colombia) Miguel Ángel Rodríguez (first round)
5. (France) Mathieu Castagnet (quarterfinals)
6. (Egypt) Karim Abdel Gawad (semifinals)
7. (Egypt) Tarek Momen (quarterfinals)
8. (Spain) Borja Golán (semifinals)

== Draw and results ==
First round
1	(Egypt) Mohd El Shorbagy	11	11	11
WC	(China) Junjie Wang	8	5	3
Q	(Egypt) Zahed Mohamed	10	11	6	6
5	(France) Mathieu Castagnet	12	7	11	11
8	(Spain) Borja Golán	14	11	11
(Egypt) Fares Dessouky	12	5	7
(Australia) Cameron Pilley	11	11	11
3	(Egypt) Omar Mosaad	4	5	7
4	(Colombia) Miguel Á. Rodríguez	9	11	11	9	5
(India) Saurav Ghosal	11	8	8	11	11
Q	(Egypt) Mohamed Abouelghar	11	6	6
6	(Egypt) Karim Abdel Gawad	13	11	11
7	(Egypt) Tarek Momen	12	11	5
Q	(Mexico) César Salazar	10	7	1	rtd
Q	(Peru) Diego Elías	8	7	4
2	(France) Grégory Gaultier	11	11	11

Quarter finals
1	(Egypt) Mohd El Shorbagy	11	11	11
5	(France) Mathieu Castagnet	9	8	8
8	(Spain) Borja Golán	11	6	11	11
(Australia) Cameron Pilley	8	11	8	4
(India) Saurav Ghosal	9	3	11	11	9
6	(Egypt) Karim Abdel Gawad	11	11	8	5	11
7	(Egypt) Tarek Momen	3	5	12
2	(France) Grégory Gaultier	11	11	14

Semi finals
1	(Egypt) Mohd El Shorbagy	11	13	11
8	(Spain) Borja Golán	7	11	9
6	(Egypt) Karim Abdel Gawad	6	6	2	rtd
2	(France) Grégory Gaultier	11	11	5

Final
1	(Egypt) Mohd El Shorbagy	11	11	11
2	(France) Grégory Gaultier	5	3	3

== See also ==
- 2016 PSA World Tour
- China Squash Open
- Women's China Squash Open 2016
