= Lauren Briggs =

English squash player (born 1979)

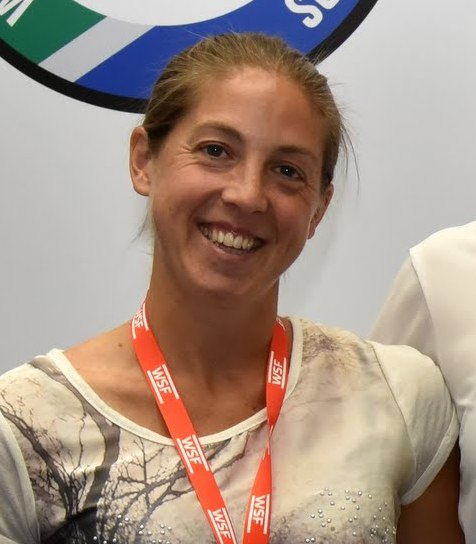

Personal information
- Born: 8 August 1979 (age 46) Stanford-Le-Hope, Essex

Sport
- Country: England
- Handedness: Right Handed
- Turned pro: 1999
- Coached by: Peter Genever
- Retired: 2013
- Racquet used: Prince

Women's singles
- Highest ranking: No. 18 (December 2008)
- Title: 12
- Tour final: 16
- Updated on February 2018

Lauren Briggs (born 8 August 1979 in Stanford-Le-Hope) is a professional squash player who represents England. She reached a career-high world ranking of World No. 18 in December 2008. She has twelve International tour titles accredited to her name, winning tournaments in America, Finland, France, Holland, Malaysia, Switzerland, England, Scotland and Wales. Briggs retired from the International WSA Tour in 2013.

In February 2015, Briggs entered into the Masters British National Championships and won the Over 35's Masters British National Championship for the first time. In the following May 2015, she won the Over 35's British Open Championship. Her Master's success continued in September 2015 after winning the European Masters in Malmo, Sweden. Further wins within the Masters category during 2016 and 2017, saw Briggs win both the Over 35's British Closed and British Open in 2016 and 2017 respectively. A return to the European Masters held in Wroclaw, Poland, 2017 was another victorious tournament for Briggs, taking her total Masters titles to 8. With a most recent win in February 2018 for the Masters British National Championship, tournament tour titles now reaches 9.

In 2018, she won her first World Masters Squash Championships title.
