= WSA World Series =

Details
- Event name: WSA World Series
- Website wsaworldtour.com/site/players/world-series-standings

Women's Winner
- Current: WSA World Series 2014

The WSA World Series (formerly known as the WISPA World Series) is a series of women's squash tournaments which are part of the Women's Squash Association (WSA) World Tour for the 2014 squash season. The eight best-performing players in the World Series events qualify for the annual WSA World Series Finals tournament.

Each year, several tournaments on the tour are designated World Series events. These include major events such as the World Championship, the US Open or the British Open. Then, early the next year, the eight best-performing players from the World Series events are invited to compete in the WSA World Series Finals (a similar event to the WTA Tour Championships).

A similar series on the men's tour is the PSA World Series.

== Tournaments ==
Here is the list of tournaments that have been at least a season WSA World Series tournament :

| Tournament | Country | Location (the last) | Notable venue | Began |
|---|---|---|---|---|
| World Championship | / | / | / | 1976 |
| British Open | (United Kingdom) Great Britain | Hull | Sports Arena | 1922 |
| US Open | United States | Philadelphia | Daskalakis Athletic Center | 2010 |
| Malaysian Open | Malaysia | Kuala Lumpur | Nu Sentral Mall | 1975 |
| Hong Kong Open | Hong Kong | Hong Kong | Tsim Sha Tsui | 2001 |
| Kuala Lumpur Open | Malaysia | Kuala Lumpur | Berjaya Times Square | 2002 |
| Qatar Classic | Qatar | Doha | Aspire Academy Squash Complex | 2001 |
| Cayman Islands Open | Cayman Islands | Grand Cayman | / | 2009 |
| Australian Open | Australia | Canberra | National Convention Centre | 1979 |

== WSA World Series Ranking Points ==
WSA World Series events also have a separate World Series ranking. Points for this are calculated on a cumulative basis after each World Series event.

| Tournament | | | World Series Ranking Points |
|---|---|---|---|---|---|---|---|---|
| Rank | Prize Money US$ | Ranking Points | Winner | Runner up | 3/4 | 5/8 | 9/16 | 17/32 |
| World Series | $70,000+ | 625 points | 100 | 65 | 40 | 25 | 15 | 10 |

In the same time, the players competing in WSA World Series Events earn world ranking points according to the prize money, classification of the event, and the final position in the draw the player reaches.

| Tournament Classification | | | World Ranking Points |
|---|---|---|---|---|---|---|---|---|---|
| Rank | Prize Money US$ | Ranking Points | Winner | Runner up | 3/4 | 5/8 | 9/16 | 17/32 | Last Rnd Q. |
| World Open | $150,000 + | 35,050 | 5,300 | 3,630 | 2,150 | 1,150 | 575 | 330 | 170 |
| World Series Platinum | $95,000 - $149,999 | 30,000 | 4,800 | 3,300 | 1,950 | 1,050 | 525 | 300 | 150 |
| World Series Gold | $70,000 - $94,999 | 21,000 | 3,360 | 2,310 | 1,365 | 7,35 | 365.5 | 210 | 105 |

== Past World Series Finals ==
| Year | Champion | Runner-up | Score in final |
|---|---|---|---|
| 2014 | World Series Finals were not held | | |
| 2013 | World Series Finals were not held | | |
| 2012 | (Malaysia) Nicol David | (England) Laura Massaro | 11–3, 11–2, 11–9 |
| 2011 | (Malaysia) Nicol David | (Republic of Ireland) Madeline Perry | 11–9, 11–9, 11–9 |

== See also ==
- PSA World Series
- Official Women's Squash World Ranking
