= Natalie Grinham =

Australian squash player (born 1978)

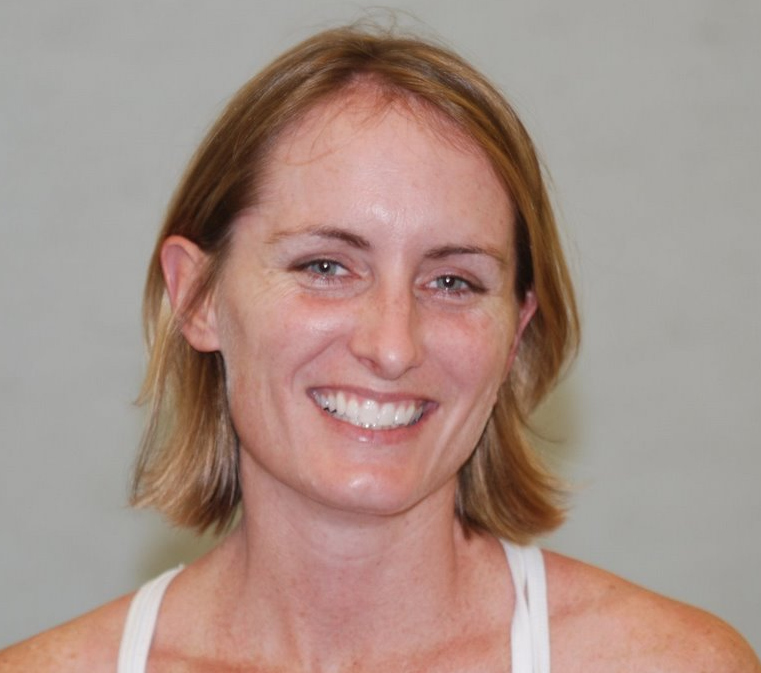

Personal information
- Full name: Natalie Marie Grinham
- Born: 16 March 1978 (age 48) Toowoomba, Australia
- Years active: 22
- Height: 155 cm (5 ft 1 in)
- Weight: 55 kg (121 lb)

Sport
- Country: Netherlands; Australia (until February 2008)
- Handedness: Right Handed
- Turned pro: 1995
- Coached by: Allistair McCaw
- Retired: 2014
- Racquet used: Dunlop

Women's singles
- Highest ranking: No. 2 (February, 2007)
- Title: 15
- Tour final: 36
- World Open: F (2004, 2006, 2007, 2009)
Medal record
Women's squash
Representing Australia
World Championships
Silver medal – second place	2004 Kuala Lumpur	Singles
Silver medal – second place	2006 Belfast	Singles
Silver medal – second place	2007 Madrid	Singles
Bronze medal – third place	2005 Hong Kong	Singles
World Team Championships
Gold medal – first place	2002 Odense	Team
Gold medal – first place	2004 Amsterdam	Team
Silver medal – second place	2000 Sheffield	Team
World Doubles Championships
Gold medal – first place	2004 Chennai	Doubles
Commonwealth Games
Gold medal – first place	2006 Melbourne	Singles
Gold medal – first place	2006 Melbourne	Doubles
Gold medal – first place	2006 Melbourne	Mixed doubles
Bronze medal – third place	2002 Manchester	Doubles
Representing Netherlands
World Championships
Silver medal – second place	2009 Amsterdam	Singles
Bronze medal – third place	2011 Rotterdam	Singles
World Games
Silver medal – second place	2009 Kaohsiung	Singles
Silver medal – second place	2013 Cali	Singles
- Updated on 12 April 2022

Natalie Marie Grinham (born 16 March 1978 in Toowoomba, Queensland, Australia) is an Australian former professional squash player. During her career, she has won three Commonwealth Games gold medals, and finished runner-up at both the World Open and the British Open. She reached her highest career ranking in 2007 when she became the World No. 2. She represented Australia in international squash competitions up to 2006. She is married to the Dutch squash player Tommy Berden, and took up Dutch citizenship in February 2008. Both Tommy and Natalie became the first husband and wife team to win a joint championship in squash after winning the respective trophies at the inaugural edition of the Tranzparanz Open in June 2006 which was held in Almere, Netherlands.

Natalie's older sister Rachael Grinham is also one of the world's former leading professional squash players.

== Squash career ==
Grinham's most significant tournament victory to date came at the 2006 Commonwealth Games, where she represented Australia. She defeated World No. 1 Nicol David in the semi-finals, before going on to beat her sister Rachael in the women's singles final 2–9, 9–6, 9–1, 9–6 to claim the gold medal. She then went on to claim two more gold medals in the doubles competitions – partnering Rachael in the women's doubles, and Joe Kneipp in the mixed doubles. Natalie and Rachael had previously won a women's doubles bronze medal at the 2002 Commonwealth Games. The sisters also won the women's doubles title at the 2004 World Doubles Squash Championships.

Grinham has finished runner-up at the World Open three times. In 2004, she lost in the final to Vanessa Atkinson 9–1, 9–1, 9–5; in 2006 she lost to Nicol David 1–9, 9–7, 3–9, 9–5, 9–2; and in 2007 she lost to sister Rachael 9–4, 10–8, 9–2. She was runner-up at the British Open in 2005, losing in the final to Nicol David 9–6, 9–7, 9–6.

Grinham is married to the Dutch squash player Tommy Berden and has lived in the Netherlands since 1999. She became a Dutch citizen in February 2008. She last represented Australia at the 2006 Commonwealth Games. Under the World Squash Federation's current rules, players must wait for three years before becoming eligible to represent a different country. Accordingly, she has represented the Netherlands from 2009 onwards.

Grinham gave birth to her first child in May 2010. She however made a quick comeback to the game winning the Women's Atwater Cup in Canada, upsetting third seed Joelle King in the final of the WISPA World Tour Silver 20 event in March 2011, less than a year after the birth of her son.

== World Open ==
=== Finals: 4 (0 title, 4 runner-up) ===
Outcome	Year	Location	Opponent in the final	Score in the final
Runner-up	2004	Kuala Lumpur, Malaysia	(Netherlands) Vanessa Atkinson	9–1, 9–1, 9–5
Runner-up	2006	Belfast, Northern Ireland	(Malaysia) Nicol David	1–9, 9–7, 3–9, 9–5, 9–2
Runner-up	2007	Madrid, Spain	(Australia) Rachael Grinham	9–4, 10–8, 9–2
Runner-up	2009	Amsterdam, Netherlands	(Malaysia) Nicol David	3–11, 11–6, 11–3, 11–8

== Major World Series final appearances ==
=== British Open: 1 finals (0 title, 1 runner-up) ===
Outcome	Year	Opponent in the final	Score in the final
Runner-up	2005	(Malaysia) Nicol David	9–6, 9–7, 9–6

=== Hong Kong Open: 1 final (0 title, 1 runner-up) ===
Outcome	Year	Opponent in the final	Score in the final
Runner-up	2007	(Malaysia) Nicol David	9–3, 9–5, 10–8

=== Qatar Classic: 2 finals (0 title, 2 runner-up) ===
Outcome	Year	Opponent in the final	Score in the final
Runner-up	2006(/07)	(Malaysia) Nicol David	9–7, 2–9, 9–7, 9–2
Runner-up	2008	(Malaysia) Nicol David	11–7, 11–3, 11–9

=== Malaysian Open: 1 final (0 title, 1 runner-up) ===
Outcome	Year	Opponent in the final	Score in the final
Runner-up	2008	(Malaysia) Nicol David	11–1, 11–4, 11–6

== Rivalries ==
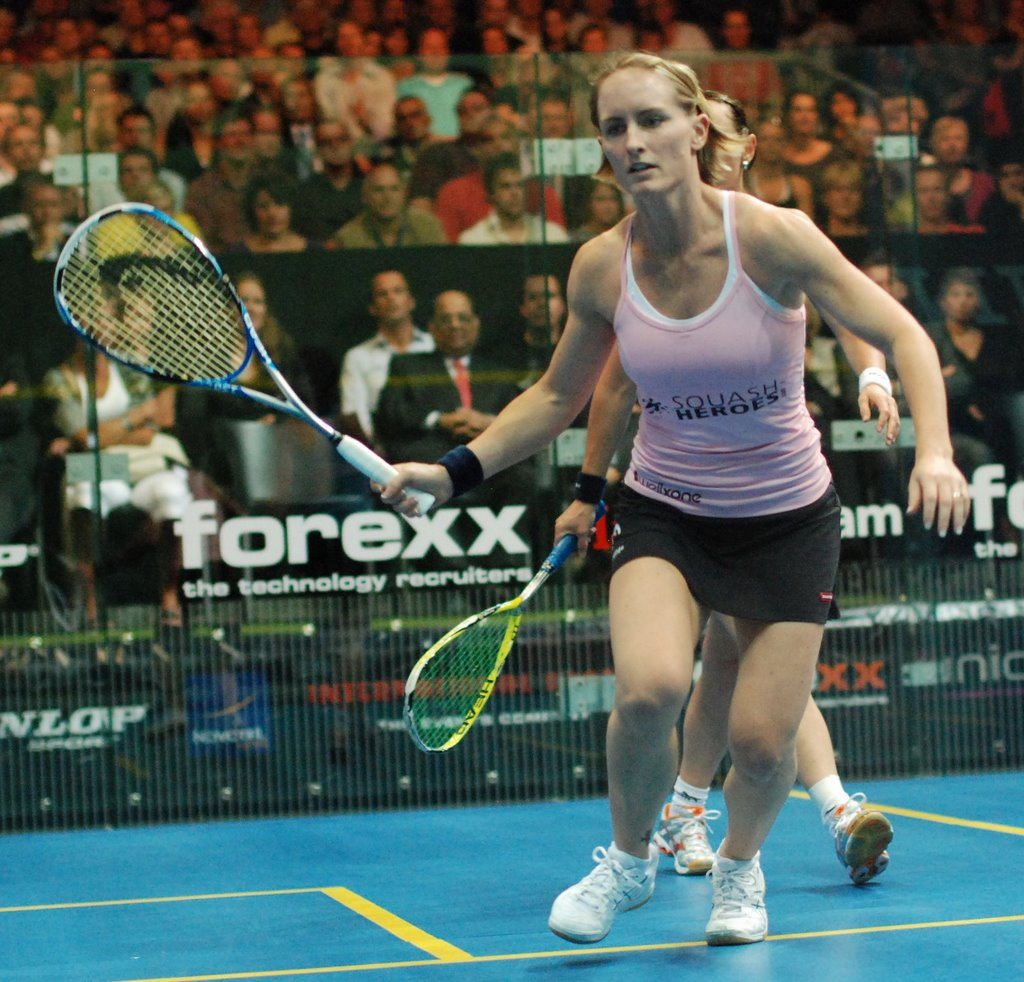
Natalie Grinham in action

=== Natalie vs. Nicol David ===
Natalie Grinham and Nicol David have a long rivalry history. They have met 30 times during their careers, with Nicol leading their overall head-to-head series 23–7. Nicol is Natalie's most frequent opponent on tour. 16 of their matches have been in tournament finals, including two in the World Open tournament. The World Open 2006 final between Natalie and Nicol is dubbed to be one of the greatest in the Women's World Open history.

== See also ==
- Official Women's Squash World Ranking
