= Rachael Grinham =

Australian squash player (born 1977)

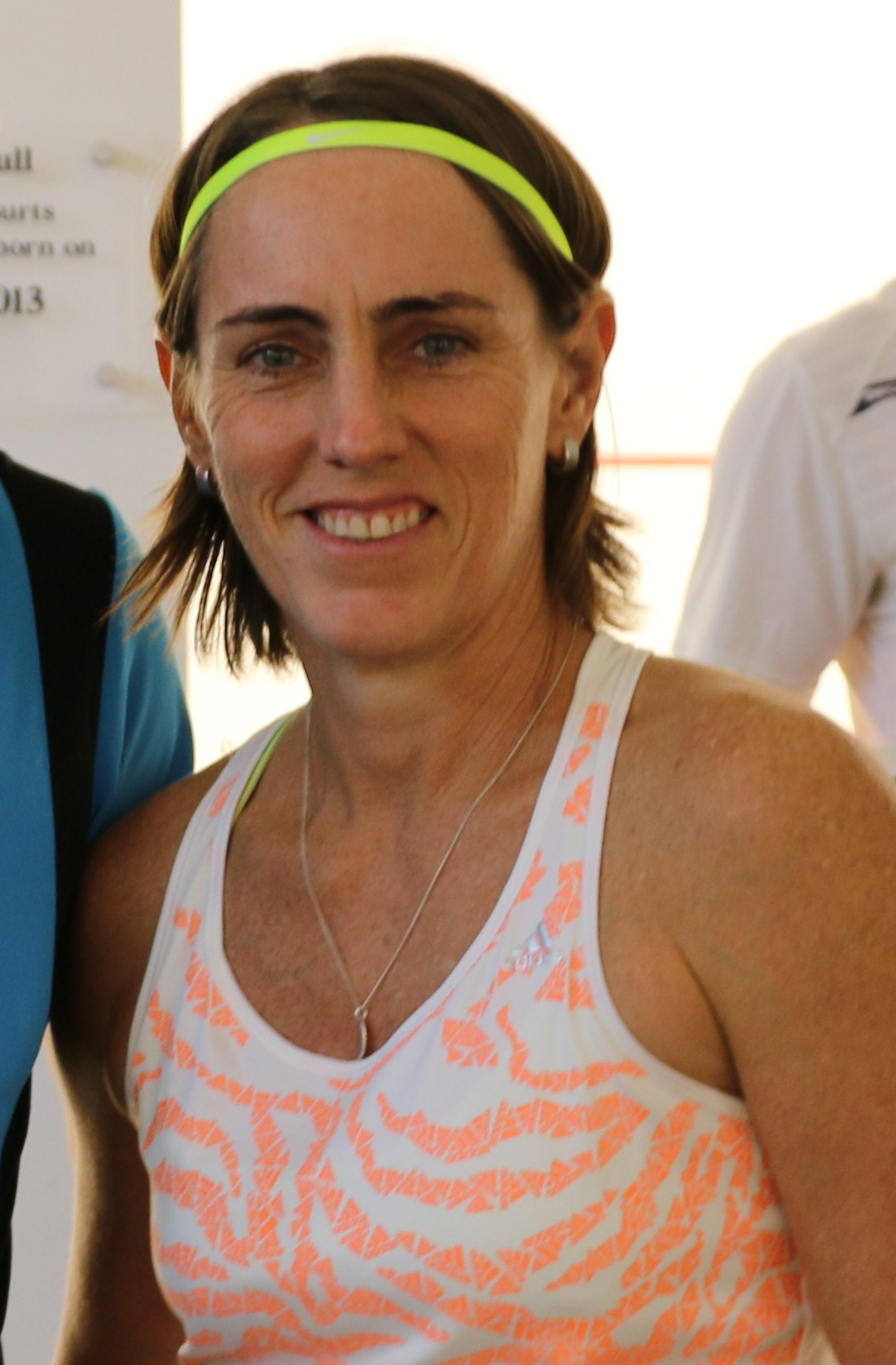
- Grinham at the British Open Masters 2019

Personal information
- Full name: Rachael Margaret Grinham
- Born: 22 January 1977 (age 49) Toowoomba, Australia
- Height: 1.58 m (5 ft 2 in)

Sport
- Country: Australia
- Handedness: Right Handed
- Turned pro: 1994
- Coached by: Maha Zein
- Retired: 2023
- Racquet used: Head

Women's singles
- Highest ranking: No. 1 (August 2004)
- Current ranking: No. 88 (December 2022)
- Title: 31
- Tour final: 58
- World Open: W (2007)
Medal record
Women's squash
Representing Australia
World Championships
Gold medal – first place	2007 Madrid	Singles
Silver medal – second place	2005 Hong Kong	Singles
Bronze medal – third place	2004 Kuala Lumpur	Singles
Bronze medal – third place	2006 Belfast	Singles
Bronze medal – third place	2009 Amsterdam	Singles
World Team Championships
Gold medal – first place	2002 Odense	Team
Gold medal – first place	2004 Amsterdam	Team
Gold medal – first place	2010 Palmerston	Team
World Doubles Championships
Gold medal – first place	2004 Chennai	Doubles
Gold medal – first place	2004 Chennai	Mixed doubles
Gold medal – first place	2006 Melbourne	Mixed doubles
Silver medal – second place	2016 Darwin	Doubles
Bronze medal – third place	2017 Manchester	Mixed doubles
World Games
Silver medal – second place	2005 Duisburg	Singles
Commonwealth Games
Gold medal – first place	2006 Melbourne	Doubles
Gold medal – first place	2014 Glasgow	Mixed doubles
Silver medal – second place	1998 Kuala Lumpur	Doubles
Silver medal – second place	2006 Melbourne	Singles
Bronze medal – third place	2002 Manchester	Singles
Bronze medal – third place	2002 Manchester	Doubles
Bronze medal – third place	2006 Melbourne	Mixed doubles
Bronze medal – third place	2018 Gold Coast	Doubles
- Updated on 12 April 2022

Rachael Margaret Grinham (born 22 January 1977 in Toowoomba, Queensland) is an Australian former professional squash player. She won the World Open in 2007, and the British Open in 2003, 2004, 2007 and 2009. She reached the World No. 1 ranking in August 2004 and held it for 16 consecutive months.

She was appointed a Member of the Order of Australia in the 2026 Australia Day Honours.

== Career ==
=== Early years ===
Grinham was the winner of the World Junior title in 1993 aged 16. In her bid to defend that title in 1995, she was beaten by Jade Wilson from New Zealand in the final. Around that time she was also part of the Australian Institute of Sport squad. Since joining the WISPA World Tour during 1994, her array of strokes and strong temperament initially took her steadily towards the top 20, a barrier she finally breached in the middle of 1997. She won her first tournament in 1998 when she was 22 years old, beating Tracey Shenton for the Open Toulouse Central in France. She also lost to Tracey Shenton in the same year at the Isostar-Beverwijk tournament, Netherlands. At the Commonwealth Games in 1998 her partnership with Robyn Cooper brought them a silver medal in the Women's Doubles.

=== 1999 ===
Rachael had a good year in 1999 winning the Swiss Open, Germering Open and Indian Open beating Claire Waddell, Sabine Schoene and Claire Nitch respectively. She ended the year ranked No. 18 on the WISPA Tour.

=== 2000–2001 ===
Rachael finished 2000 by climbing 6 places in the ranking up to No. 12 in the world. She won two tournaments, Milo National Open beating the future world No. 1 Nicol David and successfully defended her Indian Open title by beating Salma Shabana, the sister of the male current world No. 1 Amr Shabana. She climbed 4 places in 2001 to No. 8 in the world. A family final finally first happened at a WISPA World Tour event in Malaysia in February 2001 when she beat sister Natalie for the Kuala Lumpur title. Later that year, she beat Nicol David for the DMC title.

=== 2002–2003 ===
The first half of 2002 did not go well for Rachael until she beat England's Tania Bailey for the Singapore Open. One month later she took the Credit Suisse Privilege Ladies Open, one of the finest squash tournaments in the world beating Natalie Grainger. Rachael and Natalie had won a women's doubles bronze medal at the 2002 Commonwealth Games. She climbed to No. 6 in the world by the end of the year. At the beginning of 2003, she claimed the Vassar College Class of 1932 beating Vicky Botwright. She reached two finals in Helioplis Open and Hurghada International in Egypt but lost both to former world No. 1 and retired player, Carol Owens. Arguably, 2003 British Open was the turning point for the 29-year-old, who pulled off a semi-final upset over the top seed, Carol Owens, then the World No. 1, before beating Cassie Jackman in the final to claim the title for the first time. She ended the year ranked No. 3 in the world.

=== 2004 ===
2004 was far the best year in Rachael's career. She has based herself in Cairo for a few years and it had proved to be a great place to hone her game. She may be slight in stature, but there is no doubting her tenaciousness, which saw her become world number one in August 2004. She started the year by claiming the Kuwait Open, the richest squash event in the world, by beating top seed Cassie Jackman. Later on, she beat Cassie Jackman again, then the World No. 1, for the Texas Open title. Three months later, she claimed the Hurghada International in Egypt which she lost last year beating the local favourite, Omneya Abdel Kawy. She reached the final of Brunei International but lost to Vanessa Atkinson. After a series of successful tournament wins, Rachael became the world No. 1 in August after dethroning Cassie Jackman. She continued her run by beating Cassie Jackman again for the Bahrain Classic Title. She retained her British Open title by beating Natalie Grainger. She lost again to Vanessa Atkinson in the final of the Qatar Classic Open. At the World Doubles Squash Championships, Rachael won the women's doubles title in 2004 (partnering Natalie), and the mixed doubles title in 2004 (partnering David Palmer). She ended the year ranked No. 1.

=== 2005 ===
She held on the top ranking at the beginning of the year. In April, she failed to defend her Texas Open title where she lost to Vanessa Atkinson. Later this month, she won her first Qatar Challenge beating Natalie Grainger. A month later, she successfully defended her title by defeating local favourite Omneya Abdel Kawy in the Hurghada International final in a 3–2 thriller. She took sweet revenge from Vanessa Atkinson beating her for the PMI Women's Open title. She lost her British Open title suffering a loss to Nicol David in semi-finals. She beat Omneya Abdel Kawy again for the Hedonism title in Jamaica. She held top spot for 16 months only losing it to Vanessa Atkinson in November. December 2005 saw her reach the final of the 2005 World Open in Hong Kong, only to be beaten by Malaysia's Nicol David. She finished the year at No. 2 ahead of Vanessa Atkinson.

=== 2006 ===
Nicol David and Vanessa Atkinson pushed her down to number three in the rankings at the start of 2006, but apart from tilting at WISPA Tour titles, she claimed Commonwealth Games Gold in Melbourne early in the year when she teamed up with sister Natalie to win the Women's Doubles title and another family final resulted in a silver medal for her with Natalie taking gold in the singles at the same Games. At the World Doubles Squash Championships, Rachael won the mixed doubles title 2006 (partnering Joe Kneipp). In May, she failed to defend her Hurghada International title losing 3–2 to local favourite and 2004 & 2005 finalist, Omneya Abdel Kawy. The next four tournaments saw her lose to Nicol David in the final of the Qatar Challenge, semi-finals of the CIMB Malaysian Open, final of the Hotel Equatorial Penang Open and final of the British Open. Finally, in October 2006 Rachael broke her run of being beaten in WISPA Tour finals when after a run of four defeats she triumphed at the Weymuller US Open beating Natalie Grainger. She suffered another two losses to Nicol David in the semi-finals of the CPS Hong Kong Open and the World Open.

=== 2007 ===
Rachael won five titles in 2007 – the Hurghada International and the Alexandria Sporting Club Open in Egypt, the Vassar College Class of 1932 Open in the United States, the British Open, and the 2006 World Open in Spain. In the British Open final, she came back from two games down to defeat Nicol David 7–9, 4–9, 9–3, 10–8, 9–1. In the World Open, she beat sister Natalie in the final 9–4, 10–8, 9–2.

=== 2010 ===
Due to an injury, Rachael missed some of the 2010 season. However, she stayed in the top five, only moving to slot number 6 at the end of 2011. She was also a part of the Australian team that won the gold medal at the 2010 Women's World Team Squash Championships.

=== 2012 ===
In September, Rachael dropped out of the WSA Top 10 for the first time in a decade. She was also defeated in the first round by Omneya Abdel Kawy at a Malaysian Open.

=== 2013 ===
During this year Rachael was beaten at a semi-final finish by her younger sister Natalie. After that, she appeared in the Cleveland Classic's first round. She lost in the CIMB KL Open first round, had a second-round finish at the Allam British Open, and won her 32nd title at the Victoria Open.

== Personal life ==
Grinham revealed her relationship with her girlfriend, Jenny Duncalf, in 2017, making them the first two squash players to publicly come out while still active in professional play.

Her younger sister Natalie Grinham is also a former professional squash player.

== World Open ==
=== Finals: 2 (1 title, 1 runner-up) ===
Outcome	Year	Location	Opponent in the final	Score in the final
Runner-up	2005	Hong Kong	(Malaysia) Nicol David	8–10, 9–2, 9–6, 9–7
Winner	2007	Madrid, Spain	(Australia) Natalie Grinham	9–4, 10–8, 9–2

== Major World Series final appearances ==
=== British Open: 5 finals (4 titles, 1 runner-up) ===
Outcome	Year	Opponent in the final	Score in the final
Winner	2003	(England) Cassie Campion	9–3, 7–9, 9–2, 9–5
Winner	2004	(United States) Natalie Grainger	6–9, 9–5, 9–0, 9–3
Runner-up	2006	(Malaysia) Nicol David	9–4, 9–1, 9–4
Winner	2007	(Malaysia) Nicol David	7–9, 4–9, 9–3, 10–8, 9–1
Winner	2009	(Republic of Ireland) Madeline Perry	11–6, 11–5, 12–10

==== Hong Kong Open: 1 final (0 title, 1 runner-up) ====
Outcome	Year	Opponent in the final	Score in the final
Runner-up	2006	(Malaysia) Nicol David	14–12, 11–13, 11–8, 11–8

==== Qatar Classic: 3 finals (0 title, 3 runner-up) ====
Outcome	Year	Opponent in the final	Score in the final
Runner-up	2004	(Netherlands) Vanessa Atkinson	9–4, 9–7, 9–6
Runner-up	2009	(England) Jenny Duncalf	11–5, 11–3, 11–3
Runner-up	2010	(Malaysia) Nicol David	11–5, 11–8, 11–9

== Career statistics ==
Listed below.

=== WISPA Titles (27) ===
All Results for Rachael Grinham in WISPA World's Tour tournament

Legend WISPA Platinum Series (1) WISPA Gold Series (6) WISPA Silver Series (13) WISPA Tour Series (7)	Titles by Major Tournaments World Open (1) British Open (3) Hong Kong Open (0) Qatar Classic (0)

No.	Date	Tournament	Opponent in Final	Score in Final	Minutes Played
1.	1 March 1998	Toulouse Open	(England) Tracey Shenton	Unknown	Unknown
2.	7 March 1999	Swiss Open	(Scotland) Claire Waddell	9–2, 9–6, 9–3	Unknown
3.	25 April 1999	Germering Open	(Germany) Sabine Schoene	9–2, 5–9, 10–8, 9–7	Unknown
4.	2 December 1999	Indian Open	(South Africa) Claire Nitch	9–6, 0–9, 9–5, 9–7	Unknown
5.	16 April 2000	Milo Open	(Malaysia) Nicol David	9–2, 9–4, 9–6	Unknown
6.	6 August 2000	Indian Open	(Egypt) Salma Shabana	9–2, 9–2, 9–1	16 min
7.	11 February 2001	Kuala Lumpur Open	(Australia) Natalie Grinham	7–9, 0–9 (ret)	Unknown
8.	16 March 2001	DMC Open	(Malaysia) Nicol David	9–4, 9–2, 9–4	Unknown
9.	24 August 2002	Singapore Open	(England) Tania Bailey	9–4, 9–1, 9–7	29 min
10.	22 September 2002	Hong Kong Open	(United States) Natalie Grainger	9–3, 9–5, 9–7	30 min
11.	2 February 2003	Vassar College Open	(England) Vicky Botwright	9–0, 9–2, 9–4	Unknown
12.	5 October 2003	British Open	(England) Cassie Jackman	9–3, 7–9, 9–2, 9–5	50 min
13.	28 January 2004	Sheikha Al Saad Kuwait Open	(England) Cassie Jackman	2–9, 9–6, 9–2, 9–5	53 min
14.	4 April 2004	Texas Open	(England) Cassie Jackman	9–5, 9–5, 9–5	53 min
15.	12 July 2004	Hurghada International Open	(Egypt) Omneya Abdel Kawy	9–5, 9–1, 9–4	41 min
16.	16 September 2004	Bahrain Classic	(England) Cassie Jackman	5–9, 9–4, 9–4, 9–2	55 min
17.	6 November 2004	British Open (2)	(United States) Natalie Grainger	3–9, 9–5, 9–0, 9–3	41 min
18.	24 April 2005	Qatar Airways Challenge Open	(United States) Natalie Grainger	2–9, 10–8, 9–2, 9–2	51 min
19.	15 May 2005	Hurghada International Open (2)	(Egypt) Omneya Abdel Kawy	1–9, 2–9, 9–4, 9–3, 10–8	1 h 21 min
20.	11 September 2005	Seattle Open	(Netherlands) Vanessa Atkinson	9–2, 9–2, 9–4	40 min
21.	23 October 2005	Hedonism II Open	(Egypt) Omneya Abdel Kawy	7–9, 9–1, 9–2, 9–4	38 min
22.	14 October 2006	Carol Weymuller Open	(United States) Natalie Grainger	6–9, 9–6, 9–1, 1–9, 9–4	1 h 10 min
23.	13 May 2007	Hurghada International Open (3)	(Egypt) Omneya Abdel Kawy	9–4, 9–6, 9–4	44 min
24.	22 August 2007	Alexandria Open	(Egypt) Engy Kheirallah	2–9, 9–3, 9–1, 9–4	Unknown
25.	24 September 2007	British Open (3)	(Malaysia) Nicol David	7–9, 4–9, 9–3, 10–8, 9–1	1 h 27 min
26.	6 October 2007	Vassar College Open	(United States) Natalie Grainger	9–7, 10–8, 6–9, 1–9, 9–6	1 h 12 min
27.	27 October 2007	World Open	(Australia) Natalie Grinham	9–4, 10–8, 9–2	47 min

Note: (ret) = retired, min = minutes, h = hours

=== WISPA Tour Finals (Runner-Up) (14) ===
No.	Date	Tournament	Opponent in Final	Score in Final	Minutes Played
1.	22 March 1998	Isostar Circuit	(England) Tracey Shenton	Unknown	Unknown
2.	30 April 2000	Mexican Open	(Australia) Sarah Fitz-Gerald	2–9, 4–9, 6–9	Unknown
3.	18 November 2001	Grasshopper Cup	(Netherlands) Vanessa Atkinson	6–9, 1–9, 7–9	Unknown
4.	2 June 2003	Heliopolis Open	(New Zealand) Carol Owens	5–9, 5–9, 4–9	44 min
5.	9 June 2003	Hurghada International Open	(New Zealand) Carol Owens	5–9, 1–9, 5–9	37 min
6.	31 July 2004	Brunei International	(Netherlands) Vanessa Atkinson	8–10, 5–9, 9–3, 9–2, 10–8	1 h 16 min
7.	3 December 2004	Qatar Classic Open	(Netherlands) Vanessa Atkinson	4–9, 7–9, 6–9	41 min
8.	9 April 2005	Texas Open	(Netherlands) Vanessa Atkinson	10–9, 9–0, 9–4, 9–3, 9–2	1 h 1 min
9.	4 December 2005	World Open	(Malaysia) Nicol David	10–8, 2–9, 6–9, 7–9	53 min
10.	1 June 2006	Hurghada International Open	(Egypt) Omneya Abdel Kawy	6–9, 2–9, 9–7, 9–0, 2–9	1 h 15 min
11.	9 July 2006	Qatar Airways Challenge Open	(Malaysia) Nicol David	9–4, 5–9, 0–9, 0–9	54 min
12.	5 August 2006	Penang Open	(Malaysia) Nicol David	5–9, 9–6, 5–9, 3–9	55 min
13.	18 September 2006	British Open	(Malaysia) Nicol David	4–9, 1–9, 4–9	41 min
14.	2 September 2007	Dutch Open	(Malaysia) Nicol David	9–4, 9–1, 9–6	34 min

== See also ==
- List of WISPA number 1 ranked players
- Official Women's Squash World Ranking

Sporting positions
Preceded by Cassie Jackman	World No. 1 August 2004 – November 2005	Succeeded by Vanessa Atkinson
