= Camille Serme =

French squash player (born 1989)

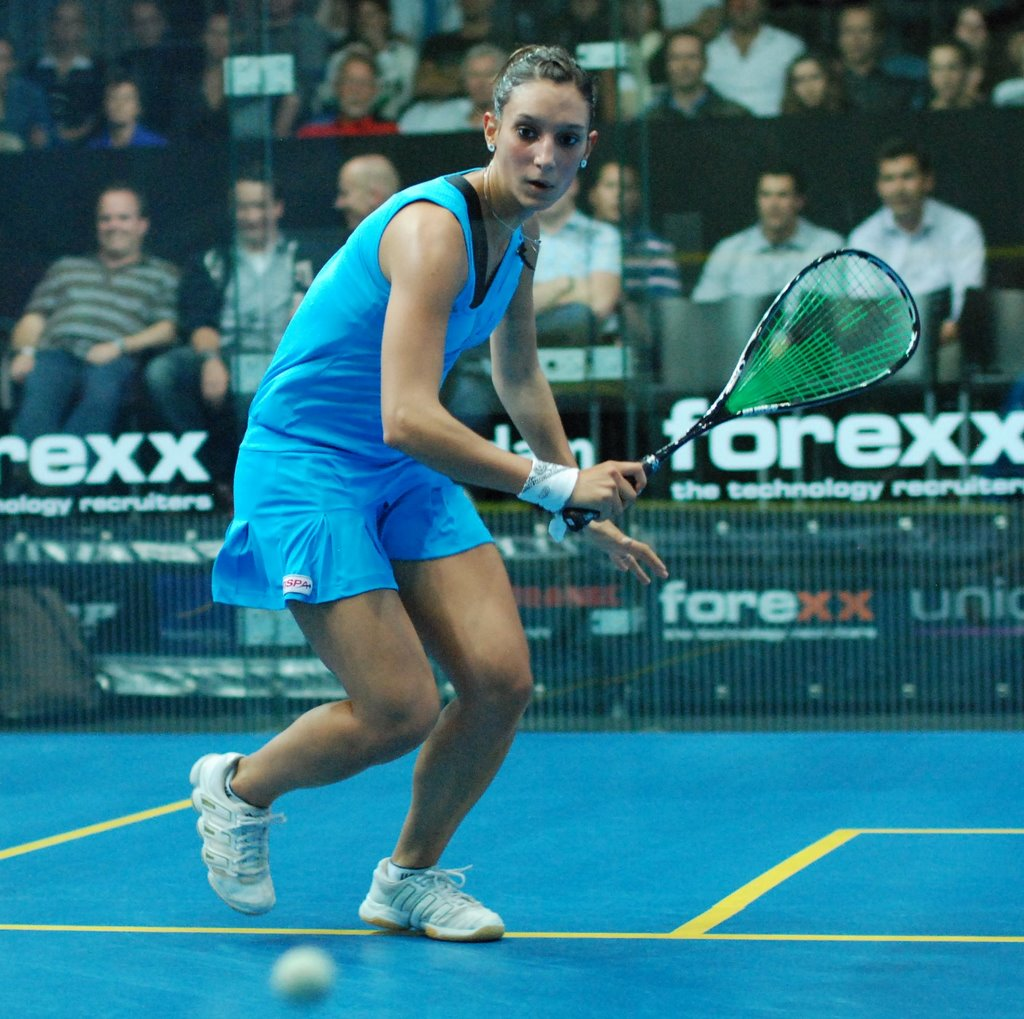
- Camille Serme during Women's World Open 2009

Personal information
- Born: 4 April 1989 (age 37) Créteil, France
- Website: CamilleSerme.fr

Sport
- Country: France
- Handedness: Right Handed
- Turned pro: 2005
- Coached by: Philippe Signoret
- Retired: 2022
- Racquet used: OPFEEL

Women's singles
- Highest ranking: No. 2 (February 2017)
- Current ranking: No. 84 (April 2025)
- Title: 15
- Tour final: 26
- World Open: SF (2010)
Medal record
Women's squash
Representing France
World Championships
Bronze medal – third place	2010 Sharm El Sheikh	Singles
Bronze medal – third place	2016 El Gouna	Singles
Bronze medal – third place	2017 Manchester	Singles
Bronze medal – third place	2018–19 Chicago	Singles
Bronze medal – third place	2020–21 Chicago	Singles
World Team Championships
Bronze medal – third place	2016 Issy-les-Moulineaux	Team
Bronze medal – third place	2018 Dalian	Team
World Games
Gold medal – first place	2017 Wrocław	Singles
Bronze medal – third place	2013 Cali	Singles

Camille Serme (born 4 April 1989) is a French professional squash player. She reached a career-high world ranking of World No. 2 in February 2017.

== Career ==
As a junior player, Camille Serme won three consecutive European Junior Championship titles, in 2006, 2007 and 2008. She was runner-up at the World Junior Championships in 2007 in Hong Kong against Raneem El Weleily.

In September 2010, she reached the semifinals of the Soho Square Women's World Open. She was the first female French player to reach this level of competition. In 2012, she reached the final of the prestigious Hong Kong Open against Nicol David. Serme won a bronze medal at the 2013 World Games and, also in 2013, achieved three feats in quick succession. In September, she lost in the semifinals of the Malaysian Open against Nicol David. In October, she reached the final of Carol Weymuller Open and then won the Monte Carlo Open beating Laura Massaro, the world No. 2, for the 2nd time in a row in the final 3-1.

In May 2015 she won the 2015 British Open, beating Laura Massaro in the final 3 games to 1. At that time it was the most important title of her career. In October 2016 she won the US Open beating Nour El Sherbini 3-1. Also in 2016, she was part of the French team that won the bronze medal at the 2016 Women's World Team Squash Championships in her home country.

Three months later her victory in the 2017 J.P. Morgan Tournament of Champions, her second consecutive PSA World Series event win, catapulted her up two places to a career high World No.2 on the February 2017 PSA Women's World Rankings. Serme also won the gold medal at the 2017 World Games in Wrocław, Poland. In 2018, she was part of the French team that won the bronze medal at the 2018 Women's World Team Squash Championships. In May 2019, Serme lost in the final of the British Open 3-11, 8-11, 3-11 to Nouran Gohar of Egypt.

Serme won her second J.P. Morgan Tournament of Champions in January 2020 by beating Nour El Sherbini 11-8, 11-6, 11-7 in the final.

She retired in 2022 but made a comeback and won her 16th PSA title after securing victory in the PSA des Hauts-de-France during the 2024–25 PSA Squash Tour.

In March 2025, Serme won the Liverpool Cricket Club Open (her 17th PSA title), and a PSA 12k Challenger event, defeating Amina El Rihany 3-0 in the final, commenting that it was extra special to win with all her family travelling with her.

== Major World Series final appearances ==
=== British Open: 2 finals (1 title, 1 runner-up) ===
Outcome	Year	Opponent in the final	Score in the final
Winner	2015	(England) Laura Massaro	11-3, 11-5, 8-11, 11-8
Runner Up	2019	(Egypt) Nouran Gohar	3-11, 8-11, 3-11

=== Hong Kong Open: 1 final (0 title, 1 runner-up) ===
Outcome	Year	Opponent in the final	Score in the final
Runner-up	2012	(Malaysia) Nicol David	11-9, 11-6, 8-11, 11-7

=== US Open: 1 final (1 title, 0 runner-up) ===
Outcome	Year	Opponent in the final	Score in the final
Winner	2016	(Egypt) Nour El Sherbini	11-8, 7-11, 12-10, 11-9

=== J.P. Morgan Tournament of Champions: 2 finals (2 titles, 0 runner-up) ===
Outcome	Year	Opponent in the final	Score in the final
Winner	2017	(England) Laura Massaro	13-11, 8-11, 4-11, 11-3, 11-7
Winner	2020	(Egypt) Nour El Sherbini	11-8, 11-6, 11-7

== See also ==
- Official Women's Squash World Ranking
- WISPA Awards

Awards and achievements
Preceded by Tenille Swartz	WISPA Young Player of the Year; 2007	Succeeded by Annie Au
Preceded by Laura Lengthorn-Massaro	WISPA Most Improved Player of the Year; 2009	Succeeded by Kasey Brown
