= Joelle King =

New Zealand squash player (born 1988)

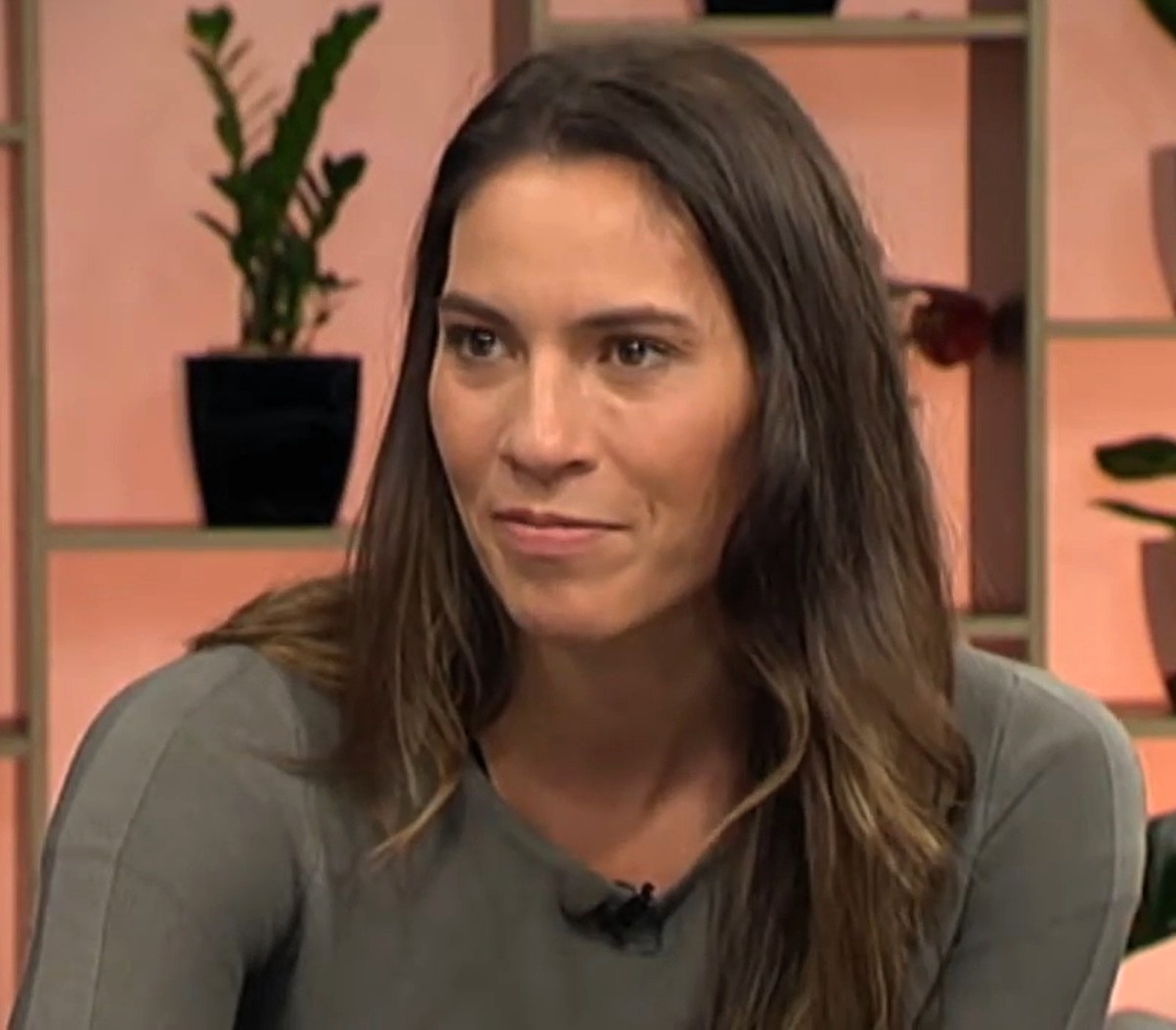
- King in 2018

Personal information
- Born: 30 September 1988 (age 38) Cambridge, New Zealand
- Height: 1.76 m (5 ft 9 in)
- Weight: 71 kg (157 lb)
- Website: www.joelleking.com

Sport
- Country: New Zealand
- Handedness: Right-handed
- Turned pro: 2004
- Coached by: Glen Wilson, Hadrian Stiff
- Retired: Active
- Racquet used: Head

Women's singles
- Highest ranking: No. 4 (November 2022)
- Current ranking: No. 65 (19 January 2026)
- Title: 11
- Tour final: 20
Medal record
Women's squash
Representing New Zealand
World Championships
Bronze medal – third place	2023 Chicago	Singles
World Doubles Championships
Gold medal – first place	2016 Darwin	Doubles
Gold medal – first place	2016 Darwin	Mixed doubles
Gold medal – first place	2017 Manchester	Doubles
Gold medal – first place	2017 Manchester	Mixed doubles
Commonwealth Games
Gold medal – first place	2010 Delhi	Doubles
Gold medal – first place	2018 Gold Coast	Singles
Gold medal – first place	2018 Gold Coast	Doubles
Gold medal – first place	2022 Birmingham	Mixed doubles
Gold medal – first place	2022 Birmingham	Doubles
Silver medal – second place	2010 Delhi	Mixed doubles
Bronze medal – third place	2014 Glasgow	Singles
Bronze medal – third place	2018 Gold Coast	Mixed doubles
- Updated on 13 April 2022

Joelle King MNZM (born 30 September 1988) is a New Zealand professional squash player. She reached a career-high world ranking of World No. 4 in April 2014.

== Early life ==
King was born and raised in Cambridge, New Zealand. She is the youngest child in her family, having two older brothers. Of Māori descent, she affiliates to Ngāti Porou.

== Career ==
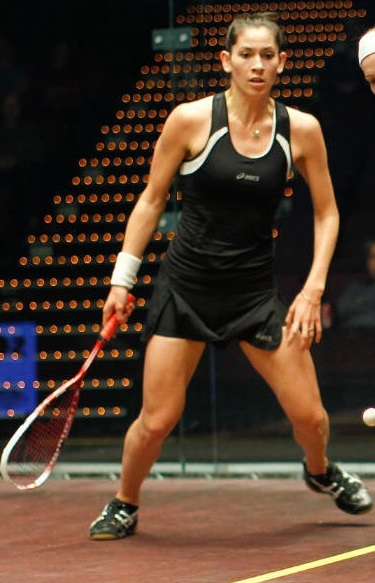
King playing in 2012

In July 2009, King won the Australian Women's Open by beating Annie Au in the final played at Clare, South Australia.

King won gold in women's doubles and silver medal in mixed doubles at the 2010 Commonwealth Games. She also won a bronze medal at the 2014 Commonwealth Games and a gold medal at the 2018 Commonwealth Games.

During the 2018 Commonwealth Games, King won the gold medal in the women's singles event for New Zealand. On the other side, fellow New Zealand squash player, Paul Coll clinched a silver medal in the men's singles event. This was also the first instance where a male and a female squash player from New Zealand had managed to qualify in the final of the respective events at a Commonwealth Games event. She won her first platinum event on the WSA tour at the 2018 Hong Kong Squash Open beating Raneem El Weleily 3–0 in the final.

King was the flagbearer for New Zealand at the Birmingham Commonwealth Games 2022 alongside Tom Walsh.

In May 2023, she reached the semi final of the 2023 PSA Women's World Squash Championship, before losing to the number 2 seed Nour El Sherbini.

== Personal life ==
On 28 December 2012, King married cricketer Ryan Shutte in Cambridge. He put his cricket career on hold to become her manager.
