= Kasey Brown =

Australian squash player (born 1985)

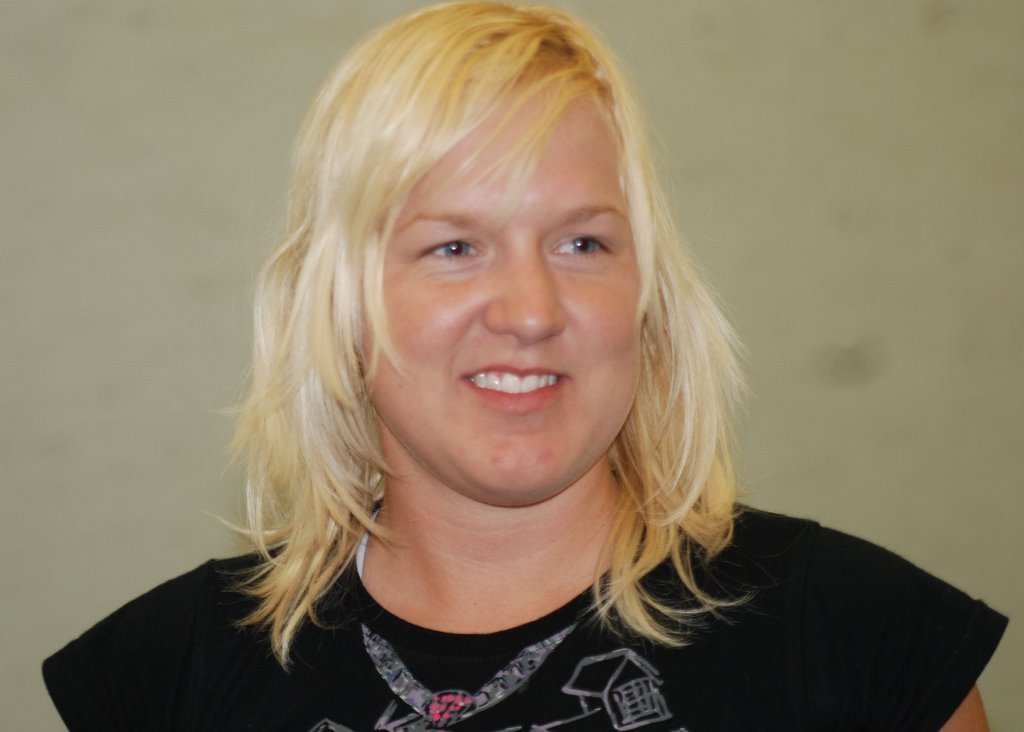
- Kasey Brown, 2009

Personal information
- Born: 1 August 1985 (age 41) Taree, Australia

Sport
- Country: Australia
- Handedness: Right Handed
- Turned pro: 2002
- Retired: 2014
- Racquet used: Harrow

Women's singles
- Highest ranking: No. 5 (December 2011)
- Title: 11
- Tour final: 23
Medal record
Women's squash
Representing Australia
World Team Championships
Gold medal – first place	2010 Palmerston North	Team
Commonwealth Games
Gold medal – first place	2010 Delhi	Mixed doubles
Bronze medal – third place	2010 Delhi	Singles
Bronze medal – third place	2010 Delhi	Doubles
Bronze medal – third place	2014 Glasgow	Mixed doubles
- Updated on October 2014

Kasey Brown (born 1 August 1985) is an Australian former squash player. She reached a career-high world ranking of World No. 5 in December 2011.

== Career ==
Brown was born in Taree, New South Wales was the Australian junior champion in 2003 and 2004 and was then the senior champion in 2006 and in the same year also won the Australian Open title. Brown was coached by Rodney Martin and was based in Greenwich, Connecticut.

During 2006, she won five WISPA events in Australia as well as the Central Open in New Zealand.

During 2010, Brown established herself as a contender on the WISPA Tour reaching the top ten world rankings at the start of 2010. She started the year with two quarter finals at the Greenwich Open and Cleveland Classic, going down to Egyptians Omneya Abdel Kawy and Raneem El Weleily. February saw Brown take her tenth tour title at the Dayton Open. Running out a straight games victory over England's Sarah Kippax in the final. She reached her first Gold level semi final in March at the Chennai Open, going down to Nicol David in the semi-final. She again lost out in David in the quarter-final of the KL Open the following week, pushing the world number one to two tie breaks in the first two games. The next few months saw Brown stack up some solid results, quarter final appearances in Cayman, Malaysia, Australia and Hong Kong.

During the 2010 Women's World Open Squash Championship as the tenth seed she reached the quarter-final defeating Madeline Perry in the round of sixteen in a 100-minute marathon. Omneya Abdel Kawy got the better of her again in the quarters. In October 2010, she represented Australia at the Commonwealth Games in Delhi and secured three medals. A truly dramatic win over Madeline Perry in the quarter-final of the singles was memorable, especially coming from two games down. She lost out to Nicol David in the semi-final and the received a walk over Alison Waters in the bronze medal play off. She took another bronze medal with teammate Donna Urquhart in the Women's Doubles. The icing on the cake was the Gold medal she achieved in the Mixed Doubles with partner Cameron Pilley. A semi final in Mexico, and the Carol Weymuller Open and a quarter final in the Qatar Classic followed. Another standout moment for Brown came in December as part of the Australian team that won the gold medal at the 2010 Women's World Team Squash Championships. Brown was rewarded for her rise in form by being given Wispa's 'Most Improved Player of the Year' award.

In 2011, she collected her eleventh and biggest tour title at the Greenwich Open with victory over Joelle King in the final.

She retired in October 2014 after competing a last time in the US Open.

Awards and achievements
Preceded by Camille Serme	WISPA Most Improved Player of the Year; 2010	Succeeded by Raneem El Weleily
