= Annie Au =

Hong Kong squash player (born 1989)

Annie Au MH
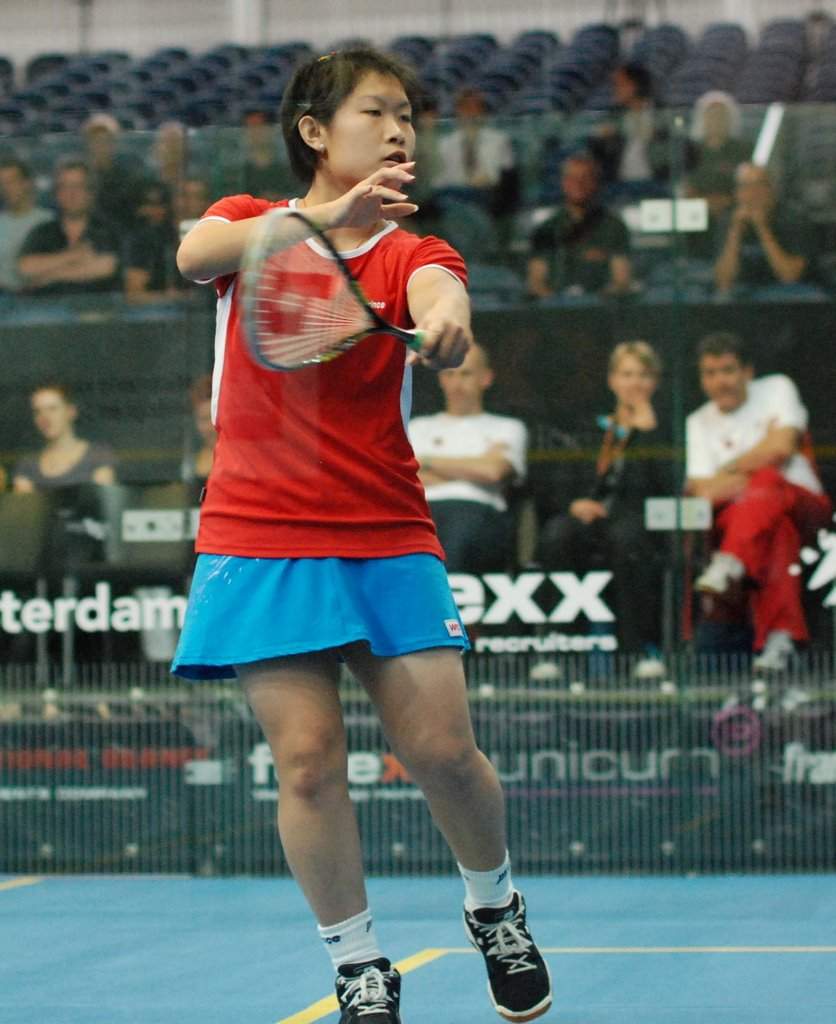
- Annie Au

Personal information
- Born: Au Wing Chi; February 9, 1989 (age 37) Hong Kong

Sport
- Country: China (Hong Kong)
- Handedness: Left Handed
- Turned pro: 2004
- Coached by: Abdul Faheem Khan
- Retired: 2020
- Racquet used: harrow

Women's singles
- Highest ranking: No. 6 (May, 2012)
- Title: 17
- Tour final: 27
Medal record
Women's squash
Representing Hong Kong
World Team Championships
Bronze medal – third place	2016 Issy-les-Moulineaux	Team
Bronze medal – third place	2018 Dalian	Team
Asian Games
Gold medal – first place	2018 Jakarta	Team
Silver medal – second place	2010 Guangzhou	Singles
Silver medal – second place	2010 Guangzhou	Team
Bronze medal – third place	2014 Incheon	Singles
Bronze medal – third place	2014 Incheon	Team
- Updated on March 2020

Annie Au Wing Chi MH (Chinese: 歐詠芝; Jyutping: au^{1} wing^{6} zi^{1}; born February 9, 1989), known as Annie Au, is a former professional squash player who represented Hong Kong.

== Career ==
Annie is a left-hander from Asia who has made a great impression in the game of squash at the junior level. Not only winning British Junior Open titles but reaching the final of the Asian Junior and being a member of the Hong Kong team which won the world juniors is also on her record. She is a tribute to the Hong Kong Squash development schemes. She started playing squash at school aged thirteen through the promotional scheme. She was coached by national coach Abdul Faheem Khan, a former professional squash player from Pakistan.

Au reached a career-high world ranking of World No. 6 in May 2012.

In 2016, she was part of the Hong Kong team that won the bronze medal at the 2016 Women's World Team Squash Championships in France. Two years later in 2018, she was again part of the Hong Kong team that won the bronze medal at the 2018 Women's World Team Squash Championships. Au retired in 2020 to join the police force.

== See also ==
- Official Women's Squash World Ranking
- WISPA Awards

Awards and achievements
Preceded by Camille Serme	WISPA Young Player of the Year; 2008	Succeeded by Nour El Sherbini
