= Epsom (New Zealand electorate) =

- Single-member general constituency for the New Zealand House of Representatives
- Interactive map of boundaries from the 2026 election
- Formation: 1996
- Region: Auckland
- Character: Urban and suburban
- Term: 3 years

Member for Epsom
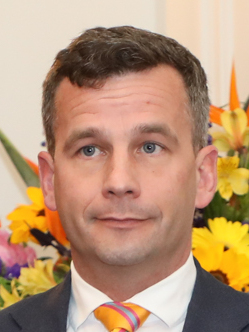
- David Seymour since 20 September 2014
- Party: ACT
- List MPs: Camilla Belich (Labour); Tanya Unkovich (NZ First); Lawrence Xu-Nan (Green)
- Previous MP: John Banks (ACT)
Party vote distribution

Epsom is a New Zealand electorate in Auckland, returning one Member of Parliament to the New Zealand House of Representatives. Since the 2014 general election, Epsom has been represented by David Seymour, the leader of the ACT Party.

Epsom has been an important electorate in New Zealand politics as, since 2005, it has allowed the ACT Party to gain seats in parliament without meeting the five percent party vote threshold as the party leaders David Seymour, John Banks and Rodney Hide have each won the electorate.

== Population centres ==
Map of boundaries at the 2020 and 2023 general elections

Epsom is based around central and eastern Auckland isthmus. It contains the suburbs of Parnell, Remuera, Mount Eden, Newmarket, half of Greenlane and the eponymous suburb of Epsom. Under boundary changes resulting from the 2006 census, Epsom was enlarged to include the central city suburb of Grafton, but most of the area was lost again following the 2013 census. In the 2025 boundary review, the electorate would gain Grafton, Newton and Eden Terrace from Auckland Central and lose Balmoral to Mount Albert, though Epsom would retain part of Balmoral after public consultation. It is New Zealand's smallest electorate, covering just 20 km^{2} (8 sq mi).

Epsom was created ahead of the first Mixed Member Proportional (MMP) election in 1996, carved out of the Remuera and Eden seats. Remuera was a safe seat for the National Party, having never elected a member of parliament from the Labour Party, while Eden was a bellwether seat, changing hands with the change of government. Both of these seats were held by National MPs – Christine Fletcher in Eden and Doug (later Sir Douglas) Graham in Remuera.

The electorate's population is predominantly European New Zealanders with a significant Asian population. The electorate has the highest proportion of people earning over $150,000 a year in all New Zealand electorates, per the 2018 census.

== History ==
The Epsom seat was first contested in New Zealand's first MMP election in 1996. The National party candidate was Christine Fletcher; she came out of the election with the nation's biggest personal majority: a 19,000 vote margin over the second placed Labour candidate, Helen Duncan.

With Fletcher standing down at the 1999 election to focus on her role as the newly elected Mayor of Auckland, the electorate battle was a contest between new National candidate Richard Worth and ACT List MP Rodney Hide. Worth won the seat by approximately 1,900 votes. In 2002, he easily retained Epsom, with other parties contesting only the party vote.

The 2005 race for Epsom was won by Rodney Hide after a tough contest for the personal vote. As the leader of ACT, Hide was determined to contest Epsom in order to guarantee his party's representation in the next parliament, should ACT not break the five percent threshold – under New Zealand electoral law, a party can gain representation by either getting five percent of the vote or by winning one or more electoral seats.

As it became more likely ACT would not break five percent, the campaign in Epsom became more intense, with Hide lobbying voters to vote strategically to keep ACT in Parliament, a message that ultimately prevailed, with National MP Richard Worth, defeated by 3,102 votes on election night and returned to Parliament via the National Party list. Hide's win in Epsom also allowed ACT member Heather Roy to enter parliament.

Hide increased his majority in 2008, and winning Epsom allowed four other ACT MPs to enter parliament. But Hide stepped down as ACT leader in April 2011 after succumbing to a leadership challenge from Don Brash. The ACT party selected former Auckland Mayor John Banks as their candidate for the 2011 election, who won the contest.

In 2013, John Banks announced that he would leave Parliament at the 2014 election, and so would not contest the Epsom electorate. After being found guilty at trial for electoral fraud, he announced his resignation effective 13 June 2014, leaving the Epsom seat vacant. Due to the proximity of the next general election, Parliament voted by supermajority to avoid a by-election.

=== Members of Parliament ===
Key

National ACT Labour Green

Election	Winner
1996 election	Christine Fletcher
1999 election	Richard Worth
2002 election	Richard Worth
2005 election	Rodney Hide
2008 election	Rodney Hide
2011 election	John Banks
2014 election	David Seymour
2017 election	David Seymour
2020 election	David Seymour
2023 election	David Seymour

=== List MPs ===
Members of Parliament elected from party lists in elections where that person also unsuccessfully contested the Epsom electorate. Unless otherwise stated, all MPs terms began and ended at general elections.

Election	Representatives
1998	Helen Duncan (Note: Replaced Jill White as list MP)
1999 election	Rodney Hide
2002 election	Rodney Hide
2002 election	Keith Locke
2005 election	Keith Locke
2005 election	Richard Worth
2008 election	Keith Locke
2008 election	Richard Worth (Note: Resigned June 2009, list place taken by Cam Calder)
2011 election	Paul Goldsmith
2011 election	David Parker
2014 election	Julie Anne Genter
2014 election	Paul Goldsmith
2017 election	Paul Goldsmith
2017 election	David Parker
2020 election	Paul Goldsmith
2020 election	Camilla Belich
2023 election	Paul Goldsmith
2023 election	Camilla Belich (Note: Replaced Andrew Little as list MP, who resigned on 5 December 2023)
2023 election	Tanya Unkovich (Note: Resigned 27 June 2025, list place taken by David Wilson)
2024	Lawrence Xu-Nan (Note: Replaced Efeso Collins as list MP, who died on 21 February 2024)

== Election results ==
=== 2026 election ===
The next election will be held on 7 November 2026. Candidates for Epsom are listed at Candidates in the 2026 New Zealand general election by electorate § Epsom. Official results will be available after 27 November 2026.

=== 2023 election ===
2023 general election: Epsom
Notes:	Blue background denotes the winner of the electorate vote. Pink background denotes a candidate elected from their party list. Yellow background denotes an electorate win by a list member, or other incumbent. A ✓ or ✗ denotes status of any incumbent, win or lose respectively.						
Party	Candidate	Votes	%	±%	Party votes	%	±%
ACT	✓ David Seymour	17,826	44.43	−2.54	5,041	12.40	+2.04
National	Paul Goldsmith	9,684	24.14	+8.73	20,948	51.54	+14.27
Labour	Camilla Belich	6,189	15.42	−9.33	5,945	14.62	−21.25
Green	Lawrence Xu-Nan	3,537	8.81	+1.34	5,507	13.55	+2.62
Opportunities	Nina Su	1,803	4.49	+2.35	1,307	3.21	+1.26
NZ First	Tanya Unkovich	573	1.42	—	1,059	2.60	+1.16
NZ Loyal	Anna Rotheray	164	0.40	—	123	0.30	—
Te Pāti Māori					299	0.73	+0.48
NewZeal					76	0.18	−+0.12
Legalise Cannabis					66	0.16	+0.08
Animal Justice					46	0.11	
Freedoms NZ					34	0.08	—
New Conservatives					28	0.06	−0.44
Women's Rights					26	0.06	—
DemocracyNZ					16	0.03	—
New Nation					5	0.01	—
Leighton Baker Party					2	0.00	—
Informal votes		339			109		
Total valid votes		40,115			40,637		
ACT hold	Majority	8,142	20.29	−1.93			

=== 2020 election ===
2020 general election: Epsom
Notes:	Blue background denotes the winner of the electorate vote. Pink background denotes a candidate elected from their party list. Yellow background denotes an electorate win by a list member, or other incumbent. A ✓ or ✗ denotes status of any incumbent, win or lose respectively.						
Party	Candidate	Votes	%	±%	Party votes	%	±%
ACT	✓ David Seymour	19,500	46.97	+3.80	4,355	10.36	+8.58
Labour	Camilla Belich	10,276	24.75	+6.26	15,078	35.87	+11.32
National	Paul Goldsmith	6,397	15.41	−13.32	15,668	37.27	−21.37
Green	Kyle MacDonald	3,101	7.47	+0.19	4,596	10.93	+2.56
Opportunities	Adriana Christie	889	2.14	—	822	1.95	−0.72
TEA	Noel Jiang	337	0.81	—	112	0.26	—
New Conservative	Norman Sutton	231	0.79	+0.19	211	0.50	+0.30
Advance NZ	Faith-Joy Aaron	166	0.39	—	147	0.34	—
Sustainable NZ	Shannon Withers	72	0.17	—	30	0.07	—
Outdoors	Maia Prochazka	31	0.07	—	7	0.01	−0.19
Not A Party	Finn Harris	24	0.05	—			
NZ First					609	1.44	−1.71
Māori Party					108	0.25	−0.07
Legalise Cannabis					38	0.08	−0.02
ONE					27	0.06	—
Social Credit					8	0.01	—
Vision NZ					8	0.01	—
Heartland					6	0.01	—
Informal votes		484			203		
Total valid votes		41,508			42,031		
Turnout		42,311	82.84	+3.17			
ACT hold	Majority	9,224	22.22	+7.78			

=== 2017 election ===
2017 general election: Epsom
Notes:	Blue background denotes the winner of the electorate vote. Pink background denotes a candidate elected from their party list. Yellow background denotes an electorate win by a list member, or other incumbent. A ✓ or ✗ denotes status of any incumbent, win or lose respectively.						
Party	Candidate	Votes	%	±%	Party votes	%	±%
ACT	✓ David Seymour	16,505	43.17	+0.09	696	1.78	−0.94
National	Paul Goldsmith	10,986	28.73	−2.87	22,875	58.64	−4.41
Labour	David Parker	7,067	18.49	+9.13	9,575	24.55	+11.16
Green	Barry Coates	2,785	7.28	−0.87	3,263	8.37	−4.13
NZ First	Julian Paul	657	1.72	+0.22	1,229	3.15	−0.32
Conservative	Leighton Baker	230	0.60	−4.05	80	0.20	−2.27
Opportunities					1,043	2.67	—
Māori Party					124	0.32	−0.14
Legalise Cannabis					38	0.10	−0.10
People's Party					34	0.09	—
United Future					24	0.06	−0.10
Ban 1080					9	0.02	0.00
Democrats					7	0.02	−0.01
Outdoors					7	0.02	—
Internet					6	0.02	−0.81 (Note: 2017 Internet Party swing is relative to the votes for Internet-Mana in 2014; it shared a party list with Mana Party in the 2014 election)
Mana Party					6	0.02	−0.81 (Note: 2017 Mana Party swing is relative to the votes for Internet-Mana in 2014; it shared a party list with the Internet Party in the 2014 election)
Informal votes		317			76		
Total valid votes		38,230			39,008		
Turnout		39,422	79.67	+1.58			
ACT hold	Majority	5,519	14.44	+3.16			

=== 2014 election ===
2014 general election: Epsom
Notes:	Blue background denotes the winner of the electorate vote. Pink background denotes a candidate elected from their party list. Yellow background denotes an electorate win by a list member, or other incumbent. A ✓ or ✗ denotes status of any incumbent, win or lose respectively.						
Party	Candidate	Votes	%	±%	Party votes	%	±%
ACT	David Seymour	15,966	43.08	−1.02	1,023	2.72	+0.17
National	Paul Goldsmith	11,716	31.61	−6.19	23,904	63.45	−1.07
Labour	Michael Wood	3,470	9.36	−1.09	5,045	13.39	−2.16
Green	Julie Anne Genter	3,021	8.15	+2.14	4,706	12.49	+0.46
Conservative	Christine Rankin	1,725	4.65	+3.70	932	2.47	+1.35
NZ First	Cliff Lyon	621	1.68	+1.68	1,308	3.47	+0.86
Mana	Patrick O'Dea	106	0.29	+0.11			
Independent	Grace Haden	59	0.16	+0.16			
Independent	Matthew Goode	37	0.10	−0.06			
Independent	Susanna Kruger	31	0.08	+0.08			
Independent	Adam Holland	21	0.06	+0.06			
Internet Mana					312	0.83	+0.67 (Note: 2014 Internet Mana swing is relative to the votes for Mana in 2011; it shared a party list with Internet in the 2014 election.)
Māori Party					174	0.46	−0.13
Legalise Cannabis					76	0.20	−0.12
United Future					61	0.16	−0.16
Civilian					17	0.05	+0.05
Democrats					10	0.03	+0.01
Ban 1080					7	0.02	+0.02
Focus					4	0.01	+0.01
Independent Coalition					3	0.01	+0.01
Informal votes		286			93		
Total valid votes		37,059			37,675		
Turnout		37,768	78.09	+2.36			
ACT hold	Majority	4,250	11.28	+4.98			

=== 2011 election ===
2011 general election: Epsom
Notes:	Blue background denotes the winner of the electorate vote. Pink background denotes a candidate elected from their party list. Yellow background denotes an electorate win by a list member, or other incumbent. A ✓ or ✗ denotes status of any incumbent, win or lose respectively.						
Party	Candidate	Votes	%	±%	Party votes	%	±%
ACT	John Banks	15,835	44.10	−11.96	939	2.55	−3.67
National	Paul Goldsmith	13,574	37.80	+15.96	23,725	64.52	+1.93
Labour	David Parker	3,751	10.45	−3.13	5,716	15.55	−4.54
Green	David Hay	2,160	6.01	−1.39	4,424	12.03	+5.10
Conservative	Simon Kan	342	0.95	+0.95	412	1.12	+1.12
Independent	Penny Bright	124	0.35	+0.35			
Mana	Patrick O'Dea	66	0.18	+0.18	91	0.16	+0.16
Independent	Matthew Goode	59	0.16	+0.16			
NZ First					959	2.61	+1.16
Māori Party					217	0.59	+0.01
Legalise Cannabis					118	0.32	+0.14
United Future					116	0.32	−0.35
Libertarianz					31	0.08	+0.03
Alliance					12	0.03	-0.001
Democrats					9	0.02	+0.01
Informal votes		443			160		
Total valid votes		35,911			36,769		
ACT hold	Majority	2,261	6.30	−27.92			

Electorate (as at 26 November 2011): 48,761

=== 2008 election ===
2008 general election: Epsom
Notes:	Blue background denotes the winner of the electorate vote. Pink background denotes a candidate elected from their party list. Yellow background denotes an electorate win by a list member, or other incumbent. A ✓ or ✗ denotes status of any incumbent, win or lose respectively.						
Party	Candidate	Votes	%	±%	Party votes	%	±%
ACT	✓ Rodney Hide	21,102	56.06	+13.44	2,389	6.22	+2.83
National	Richard Worth	8,220	21.84	−12.11	24,030	62.60	+4.09
Labour	Kate Sutton	5,112	13.58	−3.57	7,711	20.09	−7.14
Green	Keith Locke	2,787	7.40	+3.18	2,662	6.93	+1.60
United Future	Janet Tuck	163	0.43	−0.52	258	0.67	−1.07
Kiwi	Grace Haden	114	0.30	–	80	0.21	–
RAM	Rafe Copeland	79	0.21	–	27	0.07	–
Human Rights	Andrena Bishop	68	0.18	+0.09			
NZ First					557	1.45	−0.98
Māori Party					222	0.58	+0.28
Progressive					133	0.35	−0.22
Bill and Ben					120	0.31	–
Legalise Cannabis					70	0.18	−0.11
Family Party					67	0.17	–
Libertarianz					19	0.05	−0.01
Alliance					13	0.03	+0.00
Workers Party					13	0.03	–
Pacific					10	0.03	–
Democrats					6	0.02	-0.00
RONZ					2	0.01	+0.00
Informal votes		259			96		
Total valid votes		37,645			38,389		
ACT hold	Majority	12,882	34.22	+25.55			

=== 2005 election ===
2005 general election: Epsom
Notes:	Blue background denotes the winner of the electorate vote. Pink background denotes a candidate elected from their party list. Yellow background denotes an electorate win by a list member, or other incumbent. A ✓ or ✗ denotes status of any incumbent, win or lose respectively.						
Party	Candidate	Votes	%	±%	Party votes	%	±%
ACT	Rodney Hide	15,251	42.62	+20.40	1,237	3.40	-17.08
National	✗ Richard Worth	12,149	33.95	−8.74	21,310	58.51	+29.27
Labour	Stuart Nash	6,138	17.15	−7.85	9,915	27.22	−1.50
Green	Keith Locke	1,513	4.23	−1.53	1,941	5.33	−1.32
United Future	Janet Tuck	340	0.95	−1.35	636	1.75	−3.97
Progressive	Fatima Ashrafi	149	0.42	+0.42	205	0.56	−0.22
Destiny	Rod Gabb	114	0.32	+0.32	66	0.18	+0.18
Direct Democracy	Tin Yau Chan	97	0.27	+0.27	9	0.02	+0.02
Independent	Anthony Van Den Heuvel	34	0.10	+0.10			
NZ First					887	2.44	−3.70
Māori Party					107	0.29	+0.29
Christian Heritage					33	0.09	−0.58
Legalise Cannabis					25	0.07	−0.21
Libertarianz					20	0.05	+0.05
Alliance					11	0.03	−0.99
99 MP					6	0.02	+0.02
Democrats					6	0.02	+0.02
Family Rights					3	0.01	+0.01
One NZ					3	0.01	−0.03
RONZ					1	0.003	+0.003
Informal votes		245			94		
Total valid votes		35,785			36,421		
ACT gain from National	Majority	3,102	8.67	+14.57			

=== 2002 election ===
2002 general election: Epsom
Notes:	Blue background denotes the winner of the electorate vote. Pink background denotes a candidate elected from their party list. Yellow background denotes an electorate win by a list member, or other incumbent. A ✓ or ✗ denotes status of any incumbent, win or lose respectively.						
Party	Candidate	Votes	%	±%	Party votes	%	±%
National	✓ Richard Worth	13,563	42.69	+5.86	9,499	29.24	−13.96
Labour	Di Nash	7,944	25.00		9,328	28.72	+3.37
ACT	Rodney Hide	7,059	22.22	−8.93	6,652	20.48	+4.08
Green	Keith Locke	1,831	5.76		2,161	6.65	+0.90
United Future	Cindy Ruakere	731	2.30		1,857	5.72	
Christian Heritage	Tony Molloy	329	1.04		209	0.64	−0.49
Alliance	Julie Fairey	317	1.00		332	1.02	−2.33
NZ First					1,994	6.14	+3.83
Progressive					254	0.78	
Legalise Cannabis					90	0.28	−0.23
ORNZ					83	0.26	
One NZ					12	0.04	0.00
Mana Māori					6	0.02	0.00
NMP					4	0.01	−0.01
Informal votes		409			72		
Total valid votes		31,774			32,481		
National hold	Majority	5,619	17.69	+12.01			

=== 1999 election ===
1999 general election: Epsom
Notes:	Blue background denotes the winner of the electorate vote. Pink background denotes a candidate elected from their party list. Yellow background denotes an electorate win by a list member, or other incumbent. A ✓ or ✗ denotes status of any incumbent, win or lose respectively.						
Party	Candidate	Votes	%	±%	Party votes	%	±%
National	Richard Worth	12,362	36.83		14,626	43.20	+2.11
ACT	Rodney Hide	10,453	31.15		5,551	16.40	−5.64
Labour	David Jacobs	6,815	20.31		8,583	25.35	+6.19
Green	Janet McVeagh	1,601	4.77		1,946	5.75	
Alliance	Mark O'Brien	895	2.67		1,133	3.35	−1.10
Christian Heritage	Ewen McQueen	455	1.36	−0.24 (Note: Percentage change calculated as a candidate for the Christian Coalition Party in the 1996 election)	381	1.13	
NZ First	Brent Catchpole	384	1.14		783	2.31	−3.40
Legalise Cannabis	Caleb Armstrong	287	0.86		171	0.51	−0.67
McGillicuddy Serious	Worik Turei Stanton	135	0.40		54	0.16	−0.09
Independent	Michael MacDonald	119	0.35				
Natural Law	Ray Cain	56	0.17		37	0.11	−0.04
Christian Democrats					229	0.68	
United NZ					191	0.56	−0.69
Libertarianz					80	0.24	+0.08
Animals First					43	0.13	−0.02
One NZ					15	0.04	
Mauri Pacific					8	0.02	
Mana Māori					7	0.02	−0.01
NMP					7	0.02	
Republican					6	0.02	
South Island					2	0.01	
The People's Choice					1	0.00	
Freedom Movement					0	0.00	
Informal votes		470			177		
Total valid votes		33,561			33,854		
National hold	Majority	1,908	5.68				

=== 1996 election ===
1996 general election: Epsom
Notes:	Blue background denotes the winner of the electorate vote. Pink background denotes a candidate elected from their party list. Yellow background denotes an electorate win by a list member, or other incumbent. A ✓ or ✗ denotes status of any incumbent, win or lose respectively.						
Party	Candidate	Votes	%	±%	Party votes	%	±%
National	Christine Fletcher	25,217	69.95		14,870	41.09	
Labour	Helen Duncan	4,575	12.69		6,935	19.16	
Alliance	Mary Tierney	1,787	4.96		1,611	4.45	
NZ First	Gavin Logan	1,342	3.72		2,067	5.71	
ACT	John Boscawen	1,134	3.15		7,976	22.04	
Christian Coalition	Ewen McQueen	577	1.60		1,116	3.08	
Libertarianz	Lindsay Perigo	534	1.48		58	0.16	
Progressive Green	Rob Fenwick	360	1.00		149	0.41	
McGillicuddy Serious	Kerry Hoole	247	0.69		91	0.25	
Green Society	Sam Cunningham	112	0.31		54	0.15	
Natural Law	Bryan Lee	89	0.25		53	0.15	
United NZ	Bryan Mockridge	78	0.22		451	1.25	
Legalise Cannabis					427	1.18	
Ethnic Minority Party					219	0.61	
Animals First					53	0.15	
Advance New Zealand					17	0.05	
Superannuitants & Youth					15	0.04	
Asia Pacific United					11	0.03	
Mana Māori					11	0.03	
Conservatives					8	0.02	
Te Tawharau					0	0.00	
Informal votes		232			92		
Total valid votes		36,052			36,192		
National win new seat	Majority	20,642	57.26				
