= Matakana (electorate) =

Matakana is a former New Zealand parliamentary electorate in the Thames-Coromandel District, which existed for one parliamentary term from 1993 to 1996, and was held by Graeme Lee. In 1994, Lee defected from the National Party to the Christian Democrat Party.

== Population centres ==
Based on the 1991 New Zealand census, an electoral redistribution was carried out. This resulted in the abolition of nine electorates, and the creation of eleven new electorates. Through an amendment in the Electoral Act in 1965, the number of electorates in the South Island was fixed at 25, so the new electorates increased the number of the North Island electorates by two. In the South Island, one electorate was abolished and one electorate was recreated. In the North Island, five electorates were newly created (including Matakana), five electorates were recreated, and eight electorates were abolished.

The electorate was located adjacent to the Bay of Plenty on the east coast of the North Island, north of Tauranga and south of the Coromandel Peninsula. It is named after Matakana Island. Polling booths where more than 1,000 votes were cast were located in Katikati, Paeroa, Waihi, Waihi Beach, and Whangamatā. In 1996, parts of the Matakana and Hauraki electorates were taken to form the Coromandel electorate.

== History ==
This electorate was formed for the 44th session of the New Zealand Parliament in 1993. It existed for one term until 1996, and was represented by Graeme Lee of the National Party. Lee had first been elected to parliament in 1981 in the Hauraki electorate, and from 1987 to 1993, he had represented the Coromandel electorate. In 1994, Lee defected to the Christian Democrat Party. In the 1996 election, Lee stood as a list-only candidate, but as the Christian Democrats failed to make the 5% threshold, he did not re-enter parliament.

=== Members of Parliament ===
Key

National Christian Democrats

Election	Winner
1993 election	Graeme Lee

== Election results ==
=== 1993 election ===
1993 general election: Matakana
Party	Candidate	Votes	%	±%
National	Graeme Lee	6,334	33.47	
Alliance	John Neill	5,441	28.75	
NZ First	John Jefferson	3,419	18.07	
Labour	Colin Hutchinson	3,180	16.80	
Christian Heritage	Marian Clarke	240	1.27	
McGillicuddy Serious	Brent Soper	172	0.91	
Natural Law	Lynne Lee	140	0.74	
Majority		893	4.72	
Informal votes		418	2.16	
Turnout		19,344	85.34	
Registered electors		22,666		
