= Presbyterian Church of Aotearoa New Zealand =

Christian denomination in New Zealand

- Burning bush logo
- Classification: Protestant
- Orientation: Reformed
- Polity: Presbyterian
- Moderator: Taimoanaifakaofo Kaio
- Region: New Zealand
- Origin: 1901
- Separations: Reformed Churches of New Zealand; Orthodox Presbyterian Church of New Zealand
- Congregations: 419
- Members: 29,000
- Ministers: 400
- Official website: www.presbyterian.org.nz

The Presbyterian Church of Aotearoa New Zealand (PCANZ) is a major Christian denomination in New Zealand. A part of the Reformed tradition, it is the largest Presbyterian denomination in New Zealand, and known for its relatively progressive stance on doctrine and social issues, in comparison with smaller Presbyterian churches in the country. Presbyterianism was introduced to New Zealand by early 19th-century settlers, particularly from Scotland and Ireland. It was historically most prevalent in the Otago region. The PCANZ was formed in 1901 by amalgamating southern and northern Presbyterian churches. It claims around 29,000 members.

== History ==
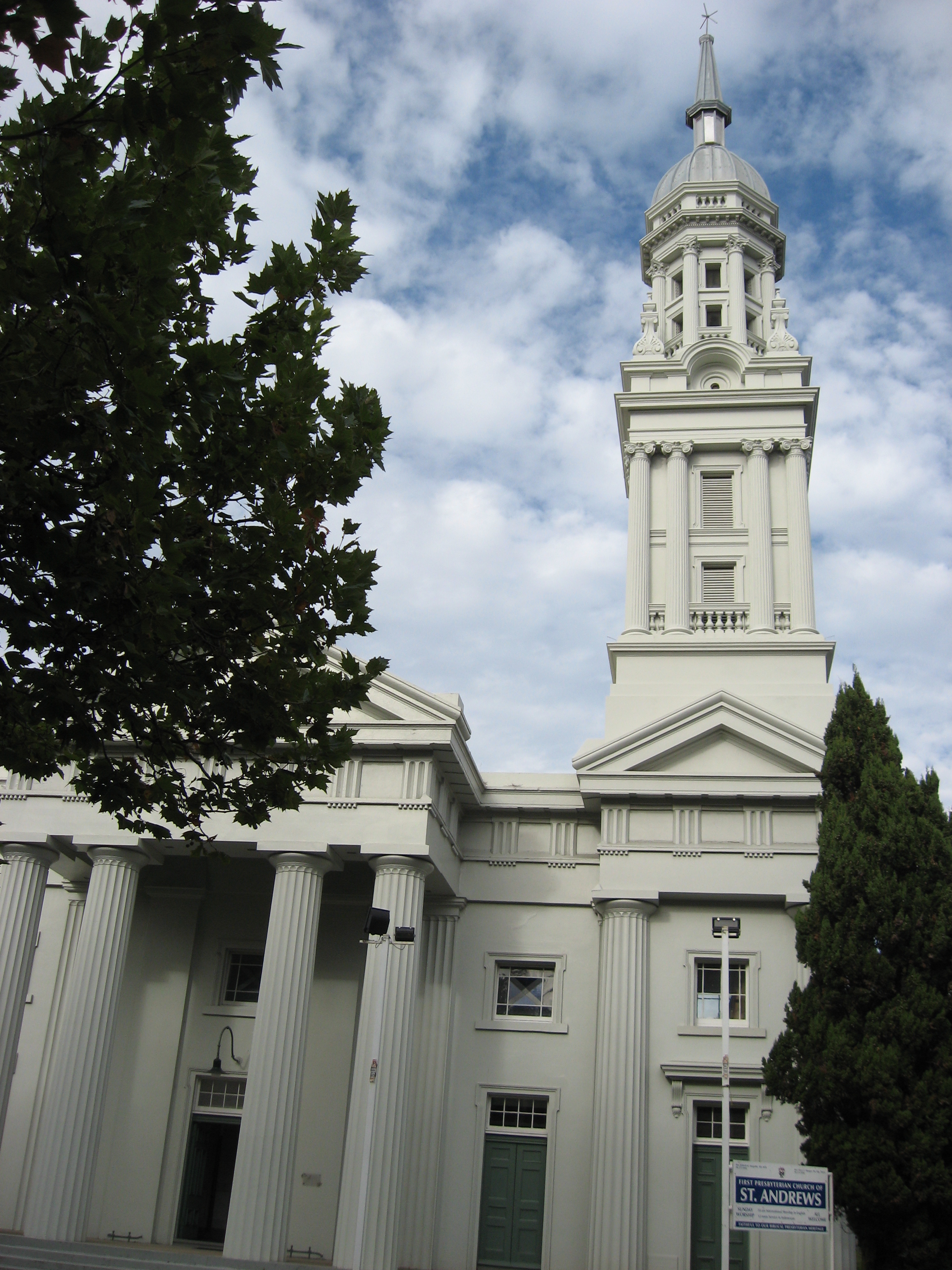
Saint Andrew's (First) Presbyterian Church, Auckland, is a congregation of the Presbyterian Church of Aotearoa New Zealand.

The Presbyterian Church of New Zealand was formed in October 1901 with the amalgamation of churches in the Synod of Otago and Southland (which had a largely Free Church heritage) with those north of the Waitaki River.

Unlike other major Christian churches, the Presbyterians did not send missionaries to New Zealand. Presbyterians had come to New Zealand as settlers from Scotland, Ireland and Australia. Dunedin (founded in 1848) and Waipu (founded in 1853) were specifically Presbyterian settlements, but significant numbers of Presbyterians settled in other parts of the country, including Christchurch, Port Nicholson (Wellington), and Auckland. Ministers came with the first European settlers to Wellington, Otago, and Waipu, but generally, nascent congregations were called ministers from Scotland. Missions to the Māori people focused on the Tuhoe people and led to the establishment of the Māori Synod, now known as Te Aka Puaho.

In 1862, the Presbytery of Auckland had support from the Presbyterian Church of Ireland and applied for support from the United Presbyterian Church of Scotland.

In 1906, 23 per cent of New Zealanders (203,600) identified as Presbyterians.

Despite initially being a theologically conservative church by the 1960s the Presbyterian Church had become quite liberal. This culminated in the Geering controversy, where an ordained minister denied the divinity and resurrection of Christ — after the Presbyterian Church dismissed a charge of doctrinal error against Geering some conservatives left to form Orthodox Presbyterian churches or joined the Reformed Church that had been established by Dutch and Boer immigrants.

Ethnic diversity grew after World War II with the arrival of Dutch and other European immigrants, and more recently with Pasifika and Asian migrants. In 1969, the majority of Congregational churches joined the Presbyterian Church of New Zealand. The word "Aotearoa" became part of the denomination's title in 1990. As of 2014, PCANZ has 419 congregations.

== Structure and activities ==
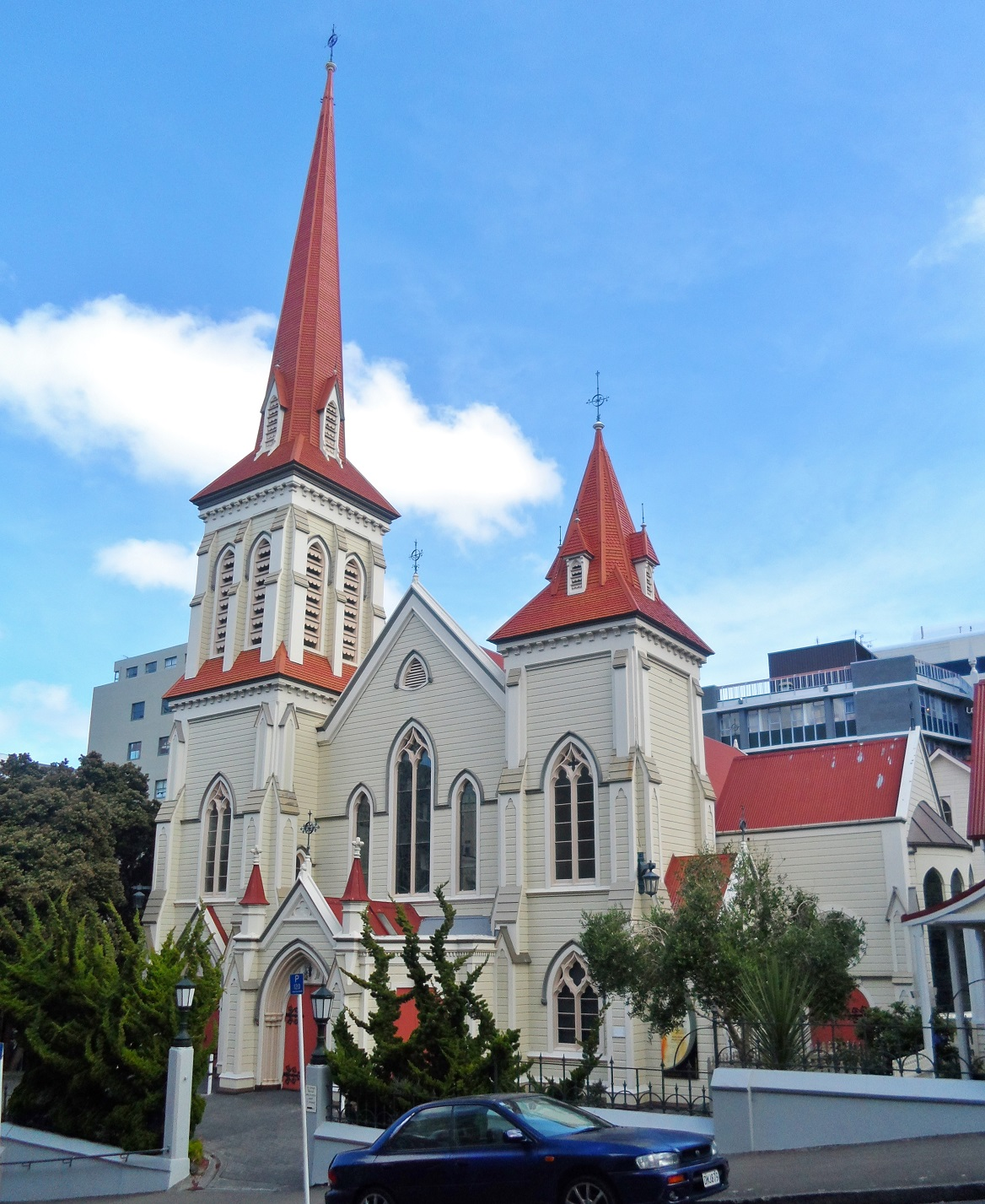
St John's in the City, Wellington

The Presbyterian Church is governed by a series of courts (councils) at local, regional and national levels. The church's leader is called a moderator and is elected by the national court.

In 2006, the denomination claimed 29,000 members in 430 congregations and 400 ministers. According to the 2013 census, a significantly higher 8.5 per cent of the New Zealand population, or 330,516 adherents, claimed some form of affiliation with the Presbyterian Church.

=== International connections ===
- Christian Conference of Asia (CCA)
- Council for World Mission (CWM)
- World Communion of Reformed Churches (WCRC)
- World Council of Churches (WCC)

=== Social involvement ===
The Presbyterian Social Services Association (PSSA) – subsequently known as "Support" – began operating in the early 20th century.

== Issues and controversies ==
=== Abuse allegations ===
In October 2022, Presbyterian Support Otago's (PSO) chief executive, Jo O'Neill, acknowledged during the Royal Commission of Inquiry into Abuse in Care that at least six historical cases of abuse had occurred at its Glendining Presbyterian Children's Homes in Andersons Bay in Dunedin. O'Neill also testified that records about children housed under PSO's care had been deliberately destroyed by an alleged paedophile ring between 2017 and 2018. O'Neill also apologised to abuse survivors. In response to O'Neill's testimony, the Presbyterian Church of Aotearoa New Zealand launched an inquiry into an alleged pedophile ring operating within Dunedin's Presbyterian community. On 5 November, the Presbyterian Church confirmed that it had appointed a King's Counsel to investigate the paedophile ring allegations.

In September 2023, the Otago Daily Times reported that the Presbyterian Church's general assembly moderator, Right Rev Hamish Galloway, had declined to compensate a sexual abuse survivor known as "Anna" because the Presbyterian Support Services Association (PSSA) was a separate organisation from the Presbyterian Church of Aotearoa New Zealand. During her childhood, Anna had been raped, drugged, and trafficked among a paedophile ring of PSSA members in Southland, Otago, and Christchurch. Anna has asserted that the two organisations were linked and criticised the Church for its perceived unwillingness to take responsibility for the wrongs committed by its support organisations. Network of Survivors in Faith-based Institutions spokeswoman Liz Tonks criticised the Presbyterian Church's abuse redress process.

In late July 2024, former Presbyterian Support Otago CEO Gillian Bremner was named in the final report of the Royal Commission of Inquiry into Abuse in Care as having instructed a staff member between 2017 and 2018 to destroy records linked to historical abuse. The only records preserved were the registers of names and dates of children and young people in the organisation's care. Male Survivors Otago denounced Bremner's actions as "despicable." On 26 July, Cooper Legal partner Sam Benton lodged a formal complaint against the New Zealand Law Society's president, Frazer Barton, after revelations that he had advised the PSO that it could destroy the records of all children in its care. Barton had previously served as a PSO board member at their destruction. Barton subsequently took leave from his position as president of the Law Society. Barton told The New Zealand Herald that he had only provided "informal advice" to Bremner and denied advising her to destroy the documents. On 26 July, PSO CEO Jo O'Neill resigned for undisclosed reasons. O'Neill had succeeded Bremner as CEO following her resignation. O'Neill had stated that "destroying the records was not a decision I would have made."

In late September 2025, moderator Right Rev Rose Luxford issued an apology to abuse survivors who had been in the care of the Presbyterian Church. This apology was in response to the findings of the Royal Commission of Inquiry into Abuse in Care into historical abuse at religious and state-run institutions. 50 survivors attended the first apology ceremony at the Otago Museum in Dunedin on 27 September. A second apology ceremony was held in Auckland on 4 October.

=== Breakaway groups ===
Several groups have broken away from the Presbyterian Church of Aotearoa New Zealand because of its liberal theology.

In the late 1940s, migrants from the Netherlands settling in New Zealand expected to find their spiritual homes in existing churches of Reformed persuasion, particularly the Presbyterian Church of New Zealand. Instead, they found it "less Reformed in doctrine and practice than they had hoped." They felt that the Declaratory Act of 1901 (which said that "diversity of opinion is recognised in this Church on such points in the Confession as do not enter into the substance of the Reformed Faith therein set forth") had "opened the doors of the Presbyterian Church to various 'winds of doctrine'." As a result, the Reformed Churches of New Zealand were officially established in 1953.

One group under George Mackenzie left in the 1960s and formed the Orthodox Presbyterian Church of New Zealand.

The other breakaway church is Grace Presbyterian Church of New Zealand, which was formed from a group of pre-existing independent churches and several churches that left the PCANZ after the homosexual controversy of 2003. These united into a new Presbyterian denomination for New Zealand.

=== Same-sex marriage ===
In 2003, the Church decided to allow ministers in sexual relationships other than marriage. This was overturned in 2004, and in a meeting of the General Assembly of the Church on 29 September 2006, this was confirmed by 230 votes to 124 (a 65% majority). This prevents people in de facto or gay relationships from becoming ministers in the church. It does not apply to people ordained before 2004. However, some liberal clergy have opposed this policy. In particular, St Andrew's Church on the Terrace in Wellington has announced that it supports same-sex marriage. St Andrew's church has been blessing same-sex civil unions since 2005. In 2014, when same-sex marriage became legal, St Andrew's Church also began performing same-sex marriage ceremonies. Other congregations have also chosen to support same-gender marriage.

== See also ==
- Christianity in New Zealand
