= Graham Capill =

New Zealand Christian leader, politician and rapist

- Born: 1959 (age 66–67); Africa
- Known for: Sex crimes, political party leader

Graham John Capill (born 1959) is a former New Zealand Christian leader, politician and convicted rapist.

He served as the first leader of the now-defunct Christian Heritage Party, stepping down in 2003. In 2005 he was convicted of multiple sexual offences against girls under 12 years of age and sentenced to nine years imprisonment. He was released on parole in August 2011, having served six years of that sentence.

== Early life ==
Capill was born in western Africa, his parents being Christian missionaries. Most of his youth was spent in New Zealand, mainly in the city of Christchurch. He was educated at Middleton Grange School, a large evangelical Protestant school in that city, where his father, Donald Capill, was vice-principal for most of the 1970s, and which his brothers, David, Murray and Timothy, also attended.

Capill went to work in the aviation industry, and qualified as a pilot and an avionics engineer. Later, Capill decided to become a minister, and studied towards a Bachelor of Divinity degree at the Reformed Theological College in Geelong, Australia. He gained his degree in 1986. He returned to New Zealand to complete an internship at Wellington, and became a minister of the Reformed Church of Dunedin in 1988. By June 1998 he was attending an Anglican church in Christchurch, but described himself as Presbyterian by conviction. Capill gained a law degree from the University of Canterbury in 1997.

Capill and his wife Judith have ten children.

== Christian Heritage Party ==
The Christian Heritage Party, founded in 1989, held its first convention in 1990. Capill was appointed the new party's leader in June of that year. He remained leader of the party through five elections, but the party failed to win any seats. Capill announced his retirement shortly after the 2002 general election, and stepped down in 2003. He was succeeded as party leader by Ewen McQueen. In November 2004 Capill resigned from the Christian Heritage citing differences of opinion over the party's new direction since his retirement.

== Police work ==
After leaving politics, he was employed as a dispatcher in the Southern Communications Centre of the New Zealand Police. Within a year he had been moved to be a police prosecutor at the Christchurch District Court, but was stood down in early 2005 pending criminal charges.

== Trial and imprisonment ==
On 23 March 2005 Capill appeared in the Christchurch District Court charged with indecently assaulting a girl aged under 12. On leaving the court he was assaulted ("punched and left whimpering on the ground") by local sickness beneficiary Daniel McNally, a former boxer. The media referred to Capill, who was then under a name-suppression order, as "a prominent New Zealander". McNally, who had no previous connection to the case, received a two-year prison sentence for the assault. On 1 April 2005 name suppression was lifted and Capill pleaded guilty to a charge of indecently assaulting an eight-year-old girl on four occasions. These events took place between the years of 2001 and 2002, while Capill was leader of Christian Heritage. His activities were brought to an end by the Rev Wally Behan, vicar of St John's Anglican Church, Latimer Square, Christchurch, the church which the Capill family attended. Behan was acting on information received from some of the victims. Further charges of rape and indecent assault against girls aged under 12 (committed during the 1990s) followed. As Capill had strongly condemned "sexual perversion" throughout his political career, the revelations had particular impact. Capill's conduct was swiftly condemned by Christian Heritage.

On 28 June 2005 Capill entered guilty pleas on a further three charges of indecent assault, one of rape, and one of unlawful sexual connection, all committed against girls under the age of 12. Newspaper reports now describe him as "a sexual predator", and he was remanded in custody while awaiting sentencing. On 14 July 2005 Capill was sentenced to imprisonment for nine years. Prior to his sentencing, he sent an e-mail to supporters, asking for forgiveness and that they pray for a light sentence, also claiming that the sex with one of the young girls was "consensual". His lawyer said that the e-mail, intended to gain sympathy and support, backfired and was ill-advised. Judge Kerr said the email sent by Capill to supporters demonstrated he had yet to fully appreciate the enormity of his offending.

On 16 August he appealed the sentence to the dismay of his critics. The appeal was abandoned on 31 January 2006.

Capill had earned a law degree before the revelation of his offending. On 9 August 2006, he was forbidden to practise law and fined $3123 at a disciplinary hearing (although Capill had never practised law privately, and described his legal studies as a "hobby"). Concerns were raised that Capill's wife and children might be unfairly burdened by this latest development, due to his inability to earn income as a prisoner.

Later that year, Capill complained that Rolleston Prison guards were interfering with photocopying and access to a university tutor for his Massey University papers, and not letting him swap children's diaries with his wife. However, another Rolleston Prison inmate who was also studying Massey University papers at the same time as Capill argued that prison guards behaved similarly toward other inmates.

On 3 October 2006, his successor, Ewen McQueen, announced the dissolution of Christian Heritage New Zealand, blaming Capill's conviction and disgrace for its demise.

In April 2008, there was public opposition when it was revealed that Capill was due to appear at a Parole Board hearing in June 2008. On 27 June 2008, it was reported that Capill's parole application had been unsuccessful due to opposition from his victims who felt there had been insufficient preventative counselling, and that the Department of Corrections and Rolleston Prison would not enroll him on Kia Marama, a child sexual abuse prevention education and counselling course, until he had served two-thirds of his sentence (circa 2011).

He was granted parole in August 2011 after having completed the nine-month Kia Marama child-sex offenders programme and having been "assessed as posing a low/medium long term risk of sexual reoffending".

However, as with other paroled and released sexual offenders, there were a number of conditional aspects to Capill's release. He was required to report to a parole officer when dealing with accommodation and employment concerns and experienced restricted mobility and autonomy in those contexts. He was forbidden from communicating with his former victims and associating with anyone under sixteen unless there were approved adult caregivers in the vicinity.

== After release ==
Capill now lives in Christchurch; his sentence ended in June 2014.

== See also ==
- Christian politics in New Zealand
