= Graeme Lee (politician) =

New Zealand politician

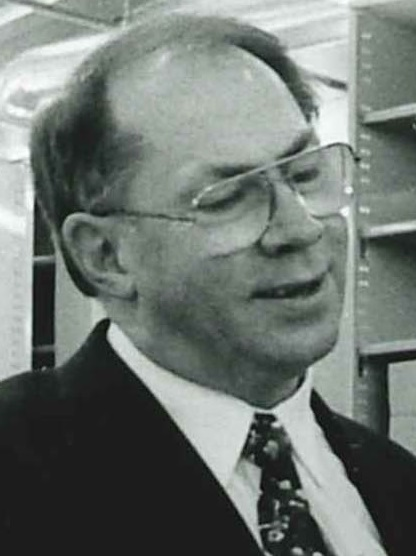
Lee in 1993

Graeme Ernest Lee MNZM JP (born 1 September 1935) is a former New Zealand politician. Originally a National Party MP, he broke away to found the Christian Democrat Party.

== Early life and family ==
Lee was born in Paeroa on 1 September 1935, the son of Ernest Walter Lee and Muriel Myrtle Lee (née Weight). His father was a builder, and later served as mayor of Paeroa from 1959. In 1977, Lee was awarded the Queen Elizabeth II Silver Jubilee Medal.

== Member of Parliament ==
New Zealand Parliament
Years	Term	Electorate	Party
1981–1984	40th	Hauraki	National
1984–1987	41st	Hauraki	National
1987–1990	42nd	Coromandel	National
1990–1993	43rd	Coromandel	National
1993–1994	44th	Matakana	National
1994–1996	Changed allegiance to:		Christian Democrats

Lee was first elected to Parliament in the 1981 election, winning the seat of Hauraki as the National candidate. Lee replaced Leo Schultz, a prominent National MP. He retained his seat from then until the 1996 election, although a change of electoral boundaries resulted in the seat which covered the Thames-Coromandel district being renamed Coromandel in 1996.

Lee, a principally conservative member of the National Party caucus would later come to believe that the National Party was drifting away from conservatism, but initially resolved to fight the shift from within the party. After a three year period as a Cabinet Minister in the Bolger government, Lee resigned from the National Party in 1993.

Lee had a reputation as one of the more conservative MPs in Parliament, and was particularly active in opposing Fran Wilde's homosexual law reform bill.

In 1990, Lee received the New Zealand 1990 Commemoration Medal.

== Christian Democrats ==
At first, it was thought likely that Lee would join the Christian Heritage Party, but talks between Lee and Christian Heritage broke down. An important issue was that of "confessionalism": Lee, while strongly believing in Christian teachings as a basis for morality, believed that anyone who shared the proper principles should be allowed to contribute, even if they were not actually Christian. The Christian Heritage Party, being strongly confessionalist, rejected this, saying that it was only logical that a Christian party should bar non-Christians from membership. This issue, as well as a number of smaller points, caused Lee to turn away from Christian Heritage and establish his own party in 1994. Lee initially called his group the United Progressive Party, but in 1995, it was relaunched as the Christian Democrats.

Sporadic talks with Christian Heritage continued, with many Christian activists putting pressure on both sides to unify. Eventually, in late 1995, the Christian Coalition was established. In the 1996 election, however, the Coalition narrowly missed out on entering Parliament. It later collapsed amid many accusations and recriminations.

In the 1997 Queen's Birthday Honours, Lee was appointed a Member of the New Zealand Order of Merit, for public services.

Lee had told his family that if he failed to remain in Parliament, he would retire from politics. After his departure from politics, he became involved as CEO for the Christian housing provider Habitat for Humanity and wrote an autobiography about his religious views and political life within the National and Christian Democrat parties, as well as his ongoing political stance. For his current organisational affiliation, see concluding paragraph and links section.

The party then renamed itself Future New Zealand and contested the 1999 elections. It later merged with Peter Dunne's United Party to form United Future New Zealand in 2000. The party received 8 seats at the 2002 election. However, most New Zealanders realised that this was merely a cosmetic change during the 47th New Zealand Parliament, with most of the caucus professing either fundamentalist Protestant or conservative Catholic religious beliefs.

== Later years ==
Graeme Lee was a minister at Auckland's Greenlane Christian Centre for a brief period of time, and was also one of the co-ordinators of Vision New Zealand, a national evangelical/ecumentalist umbrella group. Subsequently, Lee was involved in organising the New Zealand itinerary of an American televangelist, Greg Laurie, in 2011.

He has been leading the New Zealand branch of Christians for Israel, a Christian Zionist group.

His daughter, Denise Krum, stood for United Future in the 2008 general election. However, UFNZ Leader Peter Dunne was the only UFNZ MP returned to Parliament, due to his anchoring constituency seat. Krum joined the National Party in 2009, becoming a deputy chair of the Northern Region. She unsuccessfully applied to become National Party candidate for the Epsom electorate, but became a National Party List MP candidate at the 2011 New Zealand general election. However, she was ranked at 69 on the National Party list and consequently did not enter Parliament. Krum later ran successfully for the Auckland Council and was elected Councillor in 2013 for the Maungakiekie-Tamaki Ward.

== See also ==
- Christian politics in New Zealand
- https://web.archive.org/web/20060403000432/http://vision.org.nz/ Vision New Zealand (evangelical/ecumentalist umbrella group)

New Zealand Parliament
Preceded by Leo Schultz	Member of Parliament for Hauraki; 1981–1987	Vacant Constituency abolished, recreated in 1993 Title next held by Warren Kyd
Vacant Constituency recreated after abolition in 1978 Title last held by Leo Schultz	Member of Parliament for Coromandel; 1987–1993	Vacant Constituency abolished, recreated in 1996 Title next held by Murray McLean
New constituency	Member of Parliament for Matakana; 1993–1996	Constituency abolished
