= Lara Petera =

New Zealand squash player (born 1978)

Personal information
- Full name: Lara Heta
- Born: 21 December 1978 (age 47)

Sport
- Country: New Zealand
- Retired: 2003

Women's Singles
- Highest ranking: 25 (May 2003)
Medal record
Women's squash
Representing New Zealand
World Team Championships
Bronze medal – third place	2000 Sheffield	Team
Bronze medal – third place	2002 Odense	Team
World Doubles Championships
Silver medal – second place	2004 Chennai	Doubles
- Updated on 12 April 2022

Lara Heta (née Petera, born 21 December 1978) is a New Zealand professional squash player.

In 2004, Petera finished runner-up in the women's doubles event at the World Doubles Squash Championships, partnering Louise Crome. Petera and Crome also paired up in the 2006 Commonwealth Games, just missing out on a medal.
