= Grace Presbyterian Church of New Zealand =

Presbyterian denomination in New Zealand

- Classification: Protestant
- Orientation: conservative Calvinist
- Theology: Calvinist, Evangelical
- Governance: Presbyterian
- Associations: World Reformed Fellowship
- Region: New Zealand
- Origin: 2002; New Zealand
- Separations: Presbyterian Church of Aotearoa New Zealand
- Congregations: 22
- Members: unknown

Grace Presbyterian Church of New Zealand (GPCNZ) is a Presbyterian denomination in New Zealand which was formed in 2002. It currently consists of 21 churches and missions, which are in the process of becoming fully established churches.

== Background ==
Many members of the GPCNZ are former members who left the Presbyterian Church of Aotearoa New Zealand (PCANZ) as they took a more conservative view of faith and the Bible than other churches in the PCANZ. In practice this means that the GPCNZ holds different views to the PCANZ on the Bible, salvation, the gospel, preaching, homosexuality and the ordination of women. In 1974 the Evangelical Presbyterian Church was founded in Christchurch. In 2000 like minded churches formed Grace Bible Churches. In February, 2003 a fully fledged denomination with common constitution called Grace Presbyterian Church in New Zealand was formed.

== Theology ==
The Grace Presbyterian Church describes itself as "Presbyterian in government, Calvinist in theology, and Evangelical in spirit." It confesses the truth of the Trinity, the centrality of Jesus, the unconditional and yet particular love of God the Father, and the irresistible calling, present power and ministry of The Holy Spirit. Grace Presbyterian Church holds to the Westminster Confession of Faith as its official confession of faith. Grace Presbyterian Church believes in the sovereignty of God and subscribes to the Solas of the Reformation:

- Grace Alone (Sola Gratia)
- Faith Alone (Sola Fide)
- Christ Alone (Solus Christus)
- Scripture Alone (Sola Scriptura)
- God's Glory Alone (Soli Deo Gloria)

The denomination teaches that "the Bible is the inspired Word of God and it contains everything people need to know for salvation".

== Church positions on issues of particular interest ==
Grace Presbyterian Church teaches that homosexual practice is sinful. In relation to abortion, it maintains that the Bible does not distinguish between prenatal and postnatal life. GPCNZ believes that women are valued members of the church, equal in value before God, but that the Biblical scriptures do define different roles within life and the church according to the order of how God made us. This means although GPCNZ encourages men & women to serve in the church wherever they can, GPCNZ does not have women as Pastors or elders.

Each congregation has the right to own and control their own property.

Local Churches are represented in the Presbytery and the General Assembly.

== Ecumenical relations ==
GPCNZ is in the process of forming formal links with the Reformed Churches of New Zealand, the Presbyterian Church of Australia, and the Presbyterian Church in America. It is a member denomination of the World Reformed Fellowship.

== Theological institutions ==
GPCNZ does not operate its own theological college, and has approved the courses at the Grace Theological College as the churches' official training institution in New Zealand. Grace Theological College is a non-denominational institution for leaders of churches in the evangelical and Calvinist tradition. It was established in 1995.

Official website:

== Constituent churches ==
Church	Location	Year Formed	Current Pastor/Minister
Northern Presbytery			
Covenant Presbyterian Church, Manurewa	Manurewa		Geoff MacPherson (interim)
Trinity Presbyterian Church	Flat Bush	2001	Leonard Long
Providence Presbyterian Church	Māngere		Steve Panapa
Grace Church Gisborne	Gisborne		Luke Sheldrake
Grace Church Hamilton	Hamilton	2023	Bruwer Vroon
Central Presbytery
Grace Community Church New Plymouth	New Plymouth		David Farr
Grace @ Wellington	Wellington		Ian D Bayne
Evangelical Presbyterian Church of Christchurch	Christchurch	1974	John McGimpsey
Evangelical Presbyterian Church of Ashburton	Ashburton		David Bayne
Evangelical Presbyterian Church of Fairlie	Fairlie		David Bayne
Southern Presbytery
Grace Bible Church, Dunedin	Dunedin		Ben Hudson/Az Gray
Grace Presbyterian Church Waihola	Waihola		Alf Bradfield
Catlins Evangelical Church	Owaka		Matthew Tarbotton
Grace Church Gore	Gore		Sam Duthie
Wyndham Evangelical Church	Wyndham		Geoff Lloyd
Grace Presbyterian Church	Invercargill		

== See also ==
Presbyterian polity
