= Christian Coalition (New Zealand) =

- Co-leaders: Graeme Lee; Graham Capill
- Founded: 1995
- Dissolved: May 1997
- Ideology: Christian democracy

The Christian Coalition was an Evangelical Christian political party operating in New Zealand. It was an alliance of the now-defunct Christian Heritage Party and the Christian Democrats, New Zealand's two theologically conservative Christian parties. The Christian Coalition did not meet with the success that it hoped for, and was eventually dissolved.

The Coalition was established for the purpose of contesting the 1996 election, which was the first to be held using the new mixed member proportional (MMP) voting system. Under MMP, it would not be necessary for the party to win any electorate seats – it merely needed to gain more than five percent of the national vote. The party was led by the Christian Democrat's leader Graeme Lee and the Christian Heritage leader Graham Capill.

In terms of policy, the Coalition generally pursued goals located somewhere between those of the Christian Democrats and Christian Heritage. At times, there appeared to be dispute between the two groups, with the Christian Democrats pursuing a more moderate path and Christian Heritage insisting upon a hard line. There were also complaints from the Christian Democrats that Christian Heritage was dominating the Coalition, and that Graham Capill (leader of Christian Heritage and Co-leader of the Coalition as a whole) was running the party "autocratically".

Despite the internal differences within the party, however, the Coalition steadily rose in the polls. As the election drew closer, some polls showed the Coalition passing the critical five percent threshold. As the result, the party came under intense media scrutiny and was criticized by its opponents. Rather than assisting the party, however, the increased media coverage appeared to damage its chances, with many people expressing worry about the more extreme elements of the party. The Coalition claimed that the media coverage about it was biased, saying that the news media set out to "falsely" portray them as extremist. Opponents of the Coalition, however, said that the intense media scrutiny penetrated an artificial layer of reasonableness that the Coalition had adopted, revealing the party's allegedly true character. Whatever the case, the party's polling dropped below the five percent threshold once again.

In the election itself, the Christian Coalition gained 4.33% of the vote, ranking sixth. It would have needed around 13,000 more votes to enter parliament. None of the Coalition's thirty-seven electoral constituency candidates were successful.

In May 1997, the Christian Coalition disbanded, with the Christian Democrats and Christian Heritage going their own separate ways. The Christian Democrats later "secularised" themselves, removing the explicitly religious nature of their party while keeping the same policy outlook. The resultant party, Future New Zealand, merged with the United Party to form the current United Future New Zealand. Ironically, the latter split in 2007, with disgruntled fundamentalist ex-UFNZ members forming a more intransigent entity, The Kiwi Party.

Christian Heritage remained an independent party, but did not meet with the same success that it did while part of the Coalition. At the New Zealand general election, 1999 it polled 2.4% and at the New Zealand general election, 2002 it polled 1.3%, finally in the New Zealand general election, 2005, it polled 0.12 percent, its lowest ever poll rating.

Christian Heritage New Zealand and Destiny New Zealand also tried to form a second "Christian Coalition" in 2004, but were unsuccessful. In October 2006, CHNZ Leader Ewen McQueen announced the closure of CHNZ after ex-CHNZ leader Graham Capill had been jailed on multiple counts of pedophilia. Destiny New Zealand did not prove politically viable, nor did its successor, the Family Party of New Zealand.

== Electoral results ==
Election	# of party votes	% of party vote	# of seats won	Government/opposition?
1996	89,716	4.33	0 / 120	Not in Parliament

== See also ==
- Christian politics in New Zealand
