= Rodney Hide =

New Zealand politician (born 1956)

The Honourable Rodney Hide QSO
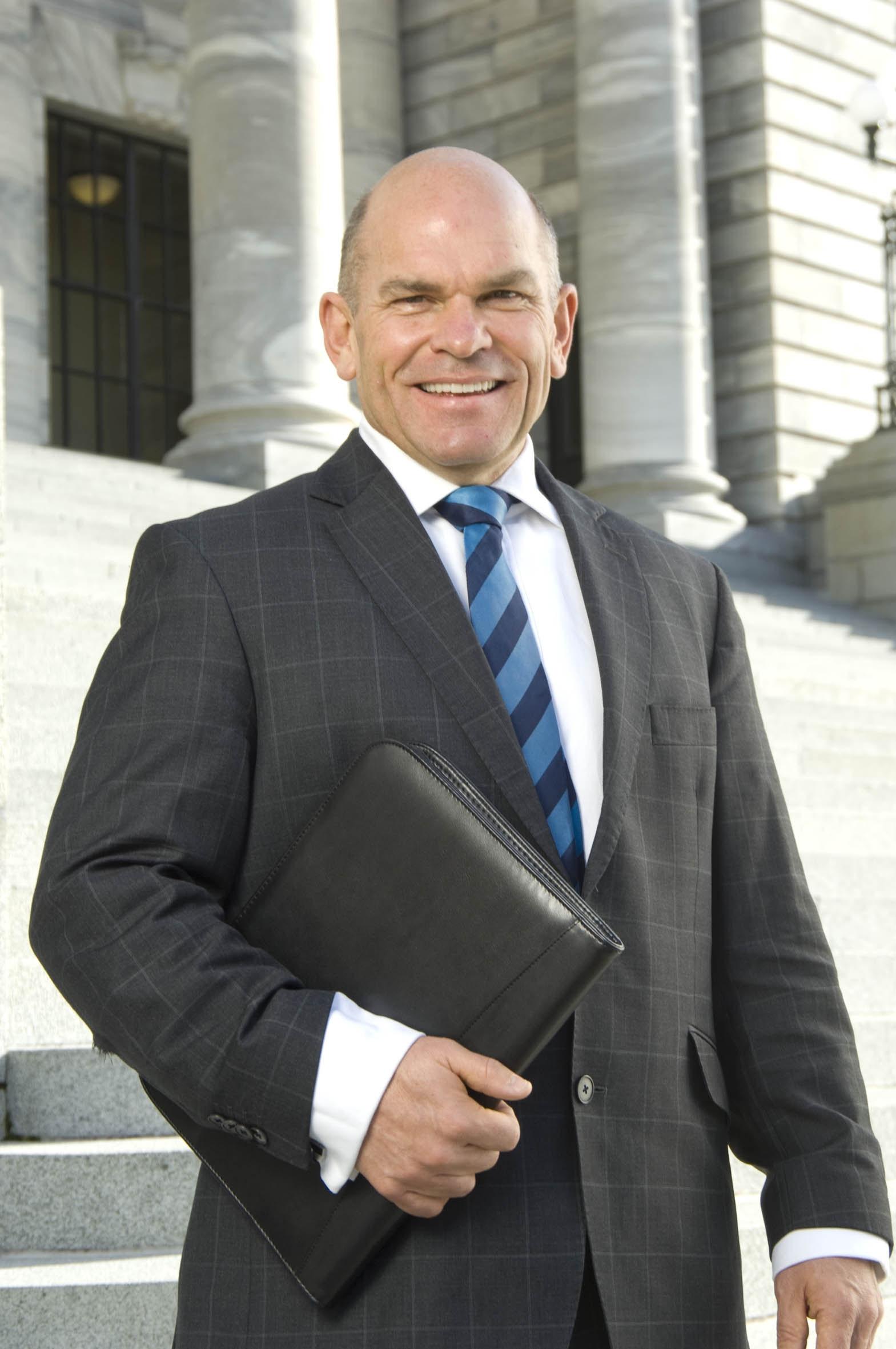
- Hide in 2008

13th Minister of Local Government
- In office 19 November 2008 – 14 December 2011
- Prime Minister: John Key
- Preceded by: Nanaia Mahuta
- Succeeded by: Chris Tremain

Minister for Regulatory Reform
- In office 19 November 2008 – 14 December 2011
- Prime Minister: John Key
- Succeeded by: John Banks

Leader of ACT New Zealand
- In office 13 June 2004 – 28 April 2011
- Deputy: Muriel Newman; Heather Roy
- Preceded by: Richard Prebble
- Succeeded by: Don Brash

Member of the New Zealand Parliament for ACT List
- In office 12 October 1996 – 17 September 2005

Member of the New Zealand Parliament for Epsom
- In office 17 September 2005 – 26 November 2011
- Preceded by: Richard Worth
- Succeeded by: John Banks
- Majority: 3102 (8.67%)

Personal details
- Born: 16 December 1956 (age 69) Oxford, New Zealand
- Party: ACT New Zealand
- Spouse: Louise Crome
- Children: 4
- Occupation: Economist

Rodney Philip Hide QSO (born 16 December 1956) is a former New Zealand politician of the ACT New Zealand party. Hide was a Member of Parliament for ACT from 1996 until 2011, was ACT's leader between 2004 and 2011, and represented the Epsom constituency from 2005 to 2011. In the Fifth National Government, Hide was Minister of Local Government, Associate Minister of Commerce and Minister of Regulatory Reform until 2011.

He stepped down as ACT leader in April 2011 after a leadership challenge from Don Brash and retired from Parliament at the general election later that year.

== Early life ==
Rodney Philip Hide was born in Oxford in Canterbury. His father, Philip Hide, owned a small mixed-farm at Cust and also drove trucks. In 1960, due to sickness, Philip Hide sold the small farm and moved to Rangiora, continuing to drive trucks until his retirement. Rodney Hide attended Rangiora High School, before gaining a degree in zoology and botany from the University of Canterbury. After completing his degree, he travelled overseas, eventually finding himself in Scotland. He worked for some time on oil rigs in the North Sea. Hide eventually returned to New Zealand by way of Romania, Egypt, India, Bangladesh, and Malaysia. In Malaysia he re-met Jiuan Jiuan—with whom he had shared a house in Christchurch—and the two married in 1983. They were to separate in 2007.

After returning to New Zealand, Hide gained a degree in resource management from Lincoln College, Canterbury. He then took up a teaching position at Lincoln, first in resource management and later in economics. He completed his master's degree in economics from Montana State University with a thesis on New Zealand's transferable fishing quotas.

In 1993, Alan Gibbs, an Auckland businessman, offered Hide a job as an economist. He accepted, and also began working at a radio station owned by Gibbs. Later, Hide also met Roger Douglas, a former Minister of Finance whose radical economic reforms Rogernomics had made a considerable impression on him.

When Douglas established the Association of Consumers and Taxpayers (which later formed the ACT party), Hide had close involvement as the organisation's first chairman and president.

== Member of Parliament ==
New Zealand Parliament
Years	Term	Electorate	List	Party
1996–1999	45th	List	7	ACT
1999–2002	46th	List	5	ACT
2002–2005	47th	List	2	ACT
2005–2008	48th	Epsom	1	ACT
2008–2011	49th	Epsom	1	ACT

Hide first entered Parliament in 1996 as a list MP. He won the party parliamentary leadership role in a closely contested primary after the retirement of Richard Prebble in 2004. He then went on to win the Epsom electorate from sitting National Party MP Richard Worth in 2005 with the campaign message "ACT is back". He retained this seat in the 2008 election.

Hide had a reputation for strong views, for his media profile, and for his confrontational style. In 2002, when Hide still sat on the back benches, one commentator described him the "leader of the opposition". Hide's supporters often described him as one of the most effective opposition MPs, and praised him for his motivation and commitment.

=== Entry into Parliament ===
Hide held the seventh place on the ACT party list for the 1996 election. ACT received enough votes for Hide to enter Parliament, making him one of the party's "founding" MPs. He gradually rose through the party's ranks, reaching second place in the ACT list for the 2002 election.

In his maiden speech, Hide made a specific attack on "perks" enjoyed by MPs, and this "perk-busting" became a characteristic of his political career until he was himself exposed for taking advantage of such perks, in taking his girlfriend on a tax payer funded trip to London and Hawaii. Hide still however claims to have developed a substantial reputation for finding and exposing "scandals", whether they relate to MPs' perks or to other governmental matters. Hide's critics often claim that his "scandals" rely on sensationalism and exaggeration, and have as their only purpose the gaining of media attention; but his supporters believe that Hide's constant scrutiny "keeps the government honest" and ensures that the administration does not waste taxpayers' money.

Roger Douglas himself has emerged as one of Hide's more prominent critics, referring to Hide's "stunts" as detracting from ACT's core economic message, shifting focus to populist issues of law and order and to provocative race relations policies. At a party conference, Douglas condemned MPs "who run any fickle line capable of grabbing short-term votes and attention", a comment allegedly directed at Hide or at his supporters. Hide acknowledges the criticism, but defends himself on the grounds that a focus on pure economic theory will not attract interest: "the problem is that the so-called stunts are particularly well-reported and my work explaining free market ideas disappears without trace." The tension between Douglas and Hide increased when Hide made a bid for the vice-presidency of ACT in 2000: supporters of Douglas interpreted this action as a challenge to Douglas' organisational authority within the party. Both Douglas and Hide stood down from their roles as president and vice-president, suggesting an uneasy truce between these two factions. In 2008 the two men worked closely together with Douglas holding third place on the party list following Hide and Heather Roy.

=== ACT Party leadership ===
Many people had known for some time that Hide saw himself as a potential parliamentary leader of the ACT party, and he himself showed no reluctance in saying so. At several points, rumours circulated that Hide planned to challenge party leader Richard Prebble for his position, although such a challenge never emerged. When Prebble eventually announced his retirement, his critics claimed that this had been brought about by secret campaigning by Hide. However, Prebble himself has denied this claim and it appears more likely that he stood down for personal reasons, as he publicly claimed.

When Prebble announced his retirement, Hide quickly indicated that he would seek the caucus leadership. Prebble, however, appeared unenthusiastic about the prospect of Hide succeeding him, and in a speech praising each of the new leadership contenders, pointedly dwelled on the others. The succession method chosen by Prebble also appeared to disfavour Hide: rather than a simple caucus vote, which a conventional leadership challenge would have called, a four-way election involved all ACT party members (although the election remained only "indicative"). Many people consider that the party organisation, in which Douglas has considerable influence, dislikes Hide.

Hide campaigned against Stephen Franks, Ken Shirley, and Muriel Newman for the ACT party parliamentary leadership. In the race he claimed that his high public profile and his image of strength would prove crucial to ACT's political survival. Stephen Franks, seen as the primary "anti-Hide" candidate and a social conservative, had the backing of Roger Douglas. In the end, however, Hide prevailed, and the party introduced Hide as its new leader on 13 June 2004.

Under Hide's leadership, the vote in the September 2005 election severely reduced ACT's party parliamentary representation. ACT's share of the party vote dropped from over 7% of the total in 2002 to around 1.5%; its representation in Parliament fell from nine MPs to two. Despite this reduction, the party remained in parliament due to Hide winning the Epsom seat. As a consequence of its reduced share of the vote, ACT received a significant cut in taxpayer-funded Parliamentary resourcing and Hide shifted his electorate office in Remuera to Newmarket, the same location as that of ACT's head office.

As a post-election strategy, Rodney Hide focused on his high-profile attacks on prominent Labour Party MPs. His campaign against alleged abuse of schoolchildren by Labour Party minister David Benson-Pope, which was verified by the now grown children involved, continued to make headlines in late 2005. In 2006, Hide voiced speculation on the leadership cadre of the National Party (then led by Don Brash), a strategy which gained him headlines but complicated the once co-operative relationship between ACT and National.

=== Dancing with the Stars ===
In 2006, Hide appeared as a contestant in the celebrity-based Dancing with the Stars television series, in which he, paired with professional dancer Krystal Stuart, competing against other celebrities. Funds raised through his performance went to St John Ambulance. Hide stated that he appeared on the show as a personal challenge, having never danced before, and despite harsh criticism from the show's judges placed fourth, after dropping his dance partner.

=== ACT in Government ===
At the 2008 election, Hide retained his Epsom seat; with a subsequent rise in party popularity, ACT increased its representation in parliament from two seats to five. The National Party won the most seats and formed a minority government with the support of ACT, the Māori Party and United Future. Hide was appointed as a Minister outside Cabinet and was appointed to the office of the Minister of Local Government, Minister for Regulatory Reform and Associate Minister of Commerce.

One of the main focuses of Hide's work in cabinet was the Auckland 'Super City' proposal for unification of the various local authorities of Auckland. This initiative was started by the then-Labour government in 2007, which set up a Royal Commission to investigate the local government arrangements in the Auckland region. The Commission reported back in 2009, but Hide and Prime Minister John Key announced that several of the commission's recommendations would not be accepted. In particular, the proposed six district sub-councils would be replaced by a local structure of 20–30 community boards. The recommendation to have separate concept Maori representation was also not accepted.

Hide faced criticism from various parties over the local authority amalgamation. Issues of satellite city boundaries, assets, financing & political consolidation were raised by North Shore City mayor Andrew Williams in 2009. That same year, the Labour Party accused Hide of mismanaging the Auckland reform process and criticised Hide's advocacy of privatising council assets and services. Labour also alleged that a bad process had led to the centralisation of power in the hands of a privileged few. In 2010, a New Zealand Herald editorial made five further criticisms of Hide's implementation of the 'super city' amalgamation:

1. Hide had a bad track record of consultation in the design of the single city,
2. He was plainly driven by his ideological agenda,
3. He had threatened to resign if the Prime Minister acceded to a strong call for Maori seats,
4. He had ignored concerns about the lack of power of local boards, and,
5. as much as 90 per cent of services were to be run by seven Government-appointed boards.

Despite these criticisms, the amalgamation went ahead and the first Auckland Council elections were held in 2010.

=== Leadership questioned ===
In November 2009, a special ACT-party caucus meeting was held to discuss the Hide's position as party leader, where he was chosen to be retained.

On 28 April 2011, he resigned as leader of ACT after a successful challenge from former National leader Don Brash. Hide indicated to Brash he would not be standing in the 2011 general election. When he left parliament he chose not to give a valedictory speech.

== Political views ==
=== Perk busting ===
Hide was criticised in November 2009 for taking his girlfriend Louise Crome on a tax-payer funded private holiday to Hawaii and on a tax-payer funded trip to London, Canada and the United States. He repaid the money for the Hawaii trip. These allegations were particularly notable given Hide's history as a self-styled parliamentary perk-buster, particularly in Opposition.

=== Climate change ===
As ACT leader, Hide criticised Labour's emissions trading scheme in September 2008. stating "the entire climate change – global warming hypothesis is a hoax... the data and the hypothesis do not hold together... Al Gore is a phoney and a fraud on this issue, and... the emissions trading scheme is a worldwide scam and swindle". He said that the legislation would drive up the cost of basic goods, ruining businesses and farmers. In November 2008, after ACT had negotiated with National for a review of the New Zealand Emissions Trading Scheme, New Zealand Herald journalist Brian Rudman commented that Hide had "fruitcake views on global warming".

In 2010, in a speech to Parliament, Hide compared government-funded climate science to the Spanish inquisition. He also accused the National Institute of Water and Atmospheric Research of being involved in a scandal with its temperature data and claimed that its scientific credibility was shredded.

In 2012, Hide continued to write opinion articles in the press questioning climate science and emissions trading schemes. In the National Business Review, Hide claimed that the Intergovernmental Panel on Climate Change (IPCC) Fourth Assessment Report in 2007 was 'infamously wrong' and contained schoolboy errors and had been written by people who had to 'believe the human-induced global warming nonsense before they start'. In the Herald, Hide said that the New Zealand Emissions Trading Scheme (ETS) is a 'scam and a waste'. Hide agreed that CO_{2} from fossil fuels is a greenhouse gas that has caused warming, but that the warming wasn't worrying until the effect had been multiplied with computer models that are programmed to cause scary climate change.

== Life after Parliament ==
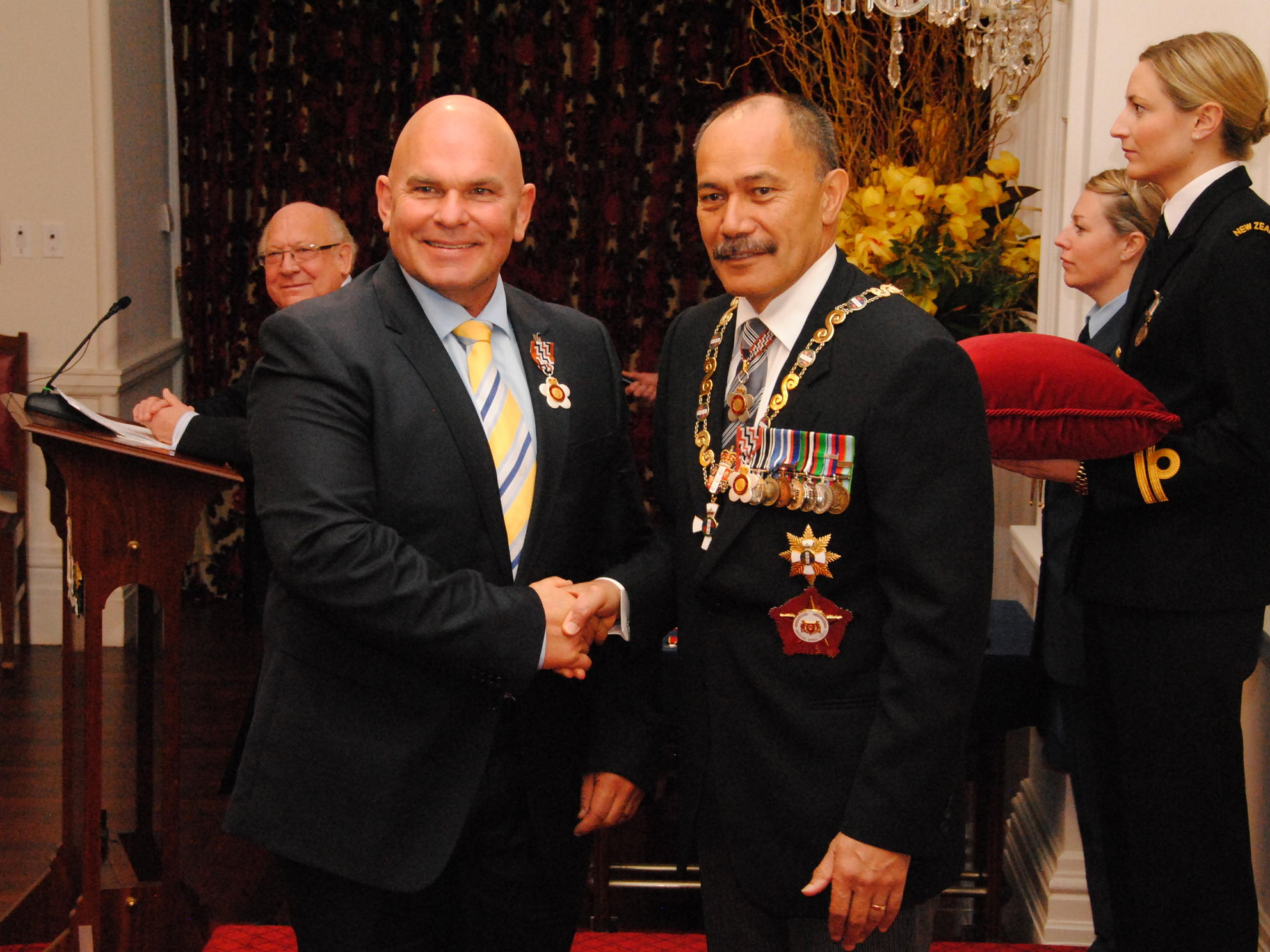
Hide (left), after his investiture as a Companion of the Queen's Service Order by the governor-general, Sir Jerry Mateparae, at Government House, Wellington, on 23 May 2013

In December 2011 Hide was granted the right to retain the title of The Honourable in recognition of his term as a Member of the Executive Council of New Zealand. He was also appointed a Companion of the Queen's Service Order in the 2013 New Year Honours, for services as a member of Parliament.

Hide wrote a political column for the New Zealand Herald for a time, and has also worked as a casual labourer. Following news of Operation Yewtree in Britain and the subsequent trial of Australian entertainer Rolf Harris, a member of the New Zealand Parliament, Maggie Barry, described a groping by Harris during a studio interview she conducted in her previous broadcasting career. Hide taunted her in his newspaper column, urging her to use her parliamentary privilege to breach the name suppression order protecting the defendant in the Queenstown suppressed indecency case.

As of 2014, Hide is now married to Louise Crome, and the couple have two girls and one son, and Hide has a son from his previous marriage.

In February 2022, Hide expressed support for the Convoy 2022 New Zealand protesters who had camped outside Parliament. In an open letter, he supported the protesters' opposition to the Labour Government's vaccine mandate and expressed disappointment with ACT leader David Seymour, who had distanced himself from the marches while stressing his belief in the right to protest. Hide also criticised the ACT party's support for the Government's lockdown and vaccine mandates, citing his belief in "human freedoms."

By 2022, Hide had joined The Platform, an online radio station founded by veteran broadcaster Sean Plunket. By March 2023, Hide had left The Platform and became a host on the anti-vaccination group Voices for Freedom's online radio station Reality Check Radio.

== Selected works ==
- Ackroyd, Peter, Rodney P. Hide, and Basil Sharp. New Zealand's ITQ system: Prospects for the evolution of sole ownership corporations. MAFFish, 1990.
- Hide, Rodney P., and Peter Ackroyd. Depoliticising fisheries management: Chatham Islands' paua (abalone) as a case study. 1990.
- Hide, Rodney P. Property rights and natural resource policy. Centre for Resource Management, Publications Section, Lincoln College, 1987.

New Zealand Parliament
Preceded by Richard Worth	Member of Parliament for Epsom; 2005–2011	Succeeded by John Banks
Party political offices
Preceded by Richard Prebble	Leader of ACT New Zealand; 2004–2011	Succeeded by Don Brash
Political offices
Preceded by Nanaia Mahuta	Minister of Local Government; 2008–2011	Succeeded by Nick Smith
New title	Minister for Regulatory Reform; 2008–2011	Succeeded by John Banks
