= Louise Crome =

New Zealand squash player (born 1978)

Personal information
- Born: 6 April 1978 (age 48) Waihi, New Zealand

Sport
- Country: New Zealand
- Turned pro: 2006
- Racquet used: Prince O3 Speedport Black

Women's singles
- Highest ranking: 22 (August 2008)
- Titles: Finland Open, Vietnam Open, Welsh Open
- Tour finals: Los Angeles Open, New Zealand Championships, Toronto Open
Medal record
Women's squash
Representing New Zealand
World Team Championships
Bronze medal – third place	2004 Amsterdam	Team
World Doubles Championships
Silver medal – second place	2004 Chennai	Doubles
- Updated on 12 April 2022

Louise Crome (born 6 April 1978, in Waihi, New Zealand) is a New Zealand former professional squash player. She toured for 3 years reaching a world ranking of 22. She was a member of the New Zealand Women's Team between 2004 - 2008 and won titles in Finland, Vietnam and Welsh Opens, and second place in Mexico, Los Angeles, Toronto Opens and New Zealand Championships.

In 2004, Crome won silver in the women's doubles event at the World Doubles Squash Championships, partnering Lara Petera. In 2006, Petera and Crome won bronze at the World Doubles Championships and later that year she represented New Zealand at the 2006 Commonwealth Games at Melbourne.

Crome graduated from the University of Auckland with a Bachelor of Commerce in Information Systems and a Masters of Business Administration with distinction from Victoria University of Wellington.

She is married to the former politician and former ACT New Zealand party leader Rodney Hide.
