= Richard Worth =

New Zealand politician (1948–2022)

The Honourable Richard Worth OBE VRD KStJ
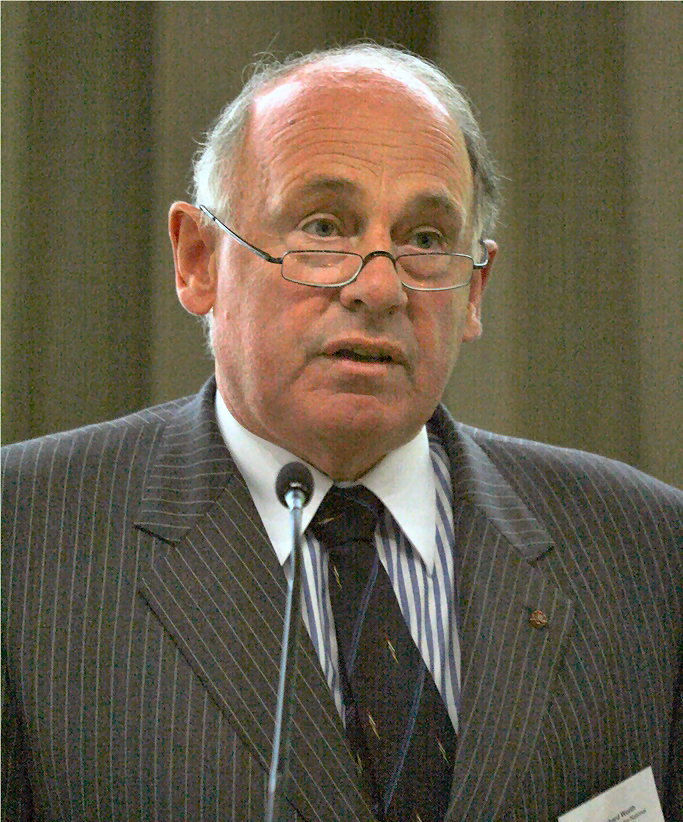
- Worth in 2009

31st Minister of Internal Affairs
- In office 19 November 2008 – 2 June 2009
- Prime Minister: John Key
- Preceded by: Rick Barker
- Succeeded by: Nathan Guy

Minister for Land Information
- In office 19 November 2008 – 2 June 2009
- Prime Minister: John Key
- Preceded by: David Parker
- Succeeded by: Maurice Williamson

Minister Responsible for the National Library
- In office 19 November 2008 – 2 June 2009
- Prime Minister: John Key
- Preceded by: Judith Tizard
- Succeeded by: Maurice Williamson (acting); Nathan Guy

Minister Responsible for Archives New Zealand
- In office 19 November 2008 – 2 June 2009
- Prime Minister: John Key
- Preceded by: Judith Tizard
- Succeeded by: Maurice Williamson (acting); Nathan Guy

Associate Minister of Justice
- In office 19 November 2008 – 2 June 2009
- Prime Minister: John Key
- Leader: Simon Power
- Preceded by: Rick Barker, Lianne Dalziel, Clayton Cosgrove
- Succeeded by: Maurice Williamson (acting); Nathan Guy

Member of the New Zealand Parliament for National party list
- In office 17 September 2005 – 16 June 2009
- Succeeded by: Cam Calder (Note: Normally, list MPs do not have individual predecessors or successors, but Worth resigned during a sitting parliament and therefore was succeeded by Calder.)

Member of the New Zealand Parliament for Epsom
- In office 27 November 1999 – 17 September 2005
- Preceded by: Christine Fletcher
- Succeeded by: Rodney Hide

Personal details
- Born: 3 July 1948 Auckland, New Zealand
- Died: 10 May 2022 (aged 73)
- Party: National Party
- Occupation: Lawyer, naval officer

Richard Westwood Worth OBE VRD KStJ (3 July 1948 – 10 May 2022) was a New Zealand politician of the New Zealand National Party. He was the Member of Parliament for Epsom from 1999 to 2005 and a list MP from 2005 to 2009.

Prior to entering Parliament, Worth studied law and business administration, and had a career in law and management. such as being the executive chair of the law firm Simpson Grierson. Worth joined the Royal New Zealand Naval Volunteer Reserves, rising to captain, and had the role of Chief of Naval Reserves for four years. He worked as consul to Columbia and honorary consul to Monaco.

Worth entered Parliament in 2005, after winning the Epsom electorate. He was in opposition from 2005 to 2008 and in government from 2008 until 2009. His roles in government included Minister of Internal Affairs, Minister for Land Information, and Associate Minister of Justice. He opposed the Civil Union Act 2004, which granted recognition of same-sex couples, proposed the creation of a National Day to replace Waitangi Day, and put forward a private members bill to address miscarriages of justice. As Minister for Land Information, Worth introduced the Reserves and Other Lands Disposal Bill in 2008 that sought to correct historic errors relating to land status.

Worth resigned from Parliament in June 2009. Party leader John Key said that Worth's conduct "[did] not befit a minister and I will not have him in my Cabinet", and said if he had not resigned he would have removed him from his Cabinet positions. While allegations about him were made public and police investigated, Worth was not charged. It was never publicly announced what caused Key to lose confidence in Worth and require his resignation. His roles after leaving Parliament included returning to the role of honorary consul to Monaco.

Worth was appointed an Officer of the Order of the British Empire (military division) in the 1994 New Year Honours for his work in the Naval Volunteer Reserves.

== Early life and career ==
Born in Auckland, Worth obtained an LLB (Hons) and Master of Jurisprudence (First Class) from the University of Auckland and a Master of Business Administration (Distinction) from Massey University. He obtained a PhD from Royal Melbourne Institute of Technology (RMIT) with a thesis entitled The Closer Economic Relationship Between Australia and New Zealand: choices other than quiescence or withdrawal in the face of conflict?, which he completed in 2004.

Worth had a career in law and management, including being the executive chairperson of Simpson Grierson, one of New Zealand's larger law firms, from 1986 to 1999. He was the consul for Colombia for six years, and later, the honorary consul for Monaco for eight. He was also a director of Prada America's Cup (NZ) Limited, but would later quit after suggestions it was disloyal for an MP to be linked to a syndicate challenging the New Zealand team.

Worth joined the Royal New Zealand Naval Volunteer Reserves in 1968, rising to captain, and had the role of Chief of Naval Reserves from July 1990 to July 1994. Worth was appointed an Officer of the Order of the British Empire (military division) in the 1994 New Year Honours for his work in the Naval Volunteer Reserves. Worth has also been involved in the Order of St John who, in 2008, made him a Knight of the Order of St John.

Worth was married and had one daughter.

== Member of Parliament ==
New Zealand Parliament
| Years | Term | Electorate | List | Party |
|---|---|---|---|---|
| 1999–2002 | 46th | Epsom | 44 | National |
| 2002–2005 | 47th | Epsom | 25 | National |
| 2005–2008 | 48th | List | 16 | National |
| 2008–2009 | 49th | List | 25 | National |

=== Electoral history and roles ===
Worth entered Parliament when he successfully stood as the National Party's candidate for the Auckland electorate of Epsom in the 1999 election, winning with a majority of 1,908. National did not win the election overall and so Worth became an Opposition MP. He was re-elected in the 2002 election with an increased majority of 5,619. In his first six years in Parliament, Worth served on the Regulations Review committee and Law and Order committee, and had appointments as the National Party spokesperson for defence, veterans' affairs and justice.

Worth lost his electorate seat in the 2005 election to the ACT New Zealand leader Rodney Hide. Hide had put out a tactical voting message calling on National voters to support him in order to elect a coalition partner for National; without winning Epsom, ACT was unlikely to win another electorate seat or to get five percent of the party vote, so would not enter Parliament. National and Worth continued to fight for the seat, but Worth lost by more than 3,000 votes. Worth was however elected as a list MP, and National's party vote in Epsom was the highest of any electorate in the country in that election. When John Key became National Party leader in November 2006, Worth was reassigned to the economic development portfolio.

At the 2008 election, Worth lost Epsom again, this time by nearly 13,000 votes, but was re-elected on the party list. National's highest party vote was again in Epsom. National also won the election overall. Worth became Minister of Internal Affairs, Minister for Land Information, Minister Responsible for Archives New Zealand, Minister Responsible for the National Library and Associate Minister of Justice. Worth was reportedly a contender for Speaker of the House, with the support of the previous speaker Jonathan Hunt, but Lockwood Smith was selected instead.

=== Policies and actions ===
Worth's maiden speech in February 2000 focused on trade, economics and Asia.

In 2002 he faced questions from his party for sightseeing in Cairo instead of attending a Maori Battalion service during an official trip to Egypt.

In 2005 he proposed the creation of a National Day to replace Waitangi Day. He proposed 24 May, the day that the New Zealand colony was granted a representative constitution by the British Parliament.

Worth was a member of the Select Committee hearing submissions about the Civil Union Bill. He was a strong opponent of the bill, which allowed legal recognition of same-sex couples though a second class of relationships besides marriage. Worth was concerned that civil unions were in effect marriages, and he described the government as "anti-family" and said that "marriage is a valuable institution in civil society and it is important that its value is not degraded or diminished by Act of Parliament." Worth said that civil unions would discriminate against non-sexual relationships, and proposed an amendment to the bill which would allow any two people, including family members and friends, to register a civil relationship that established certain rights such as right to visit in hospital or make medical decisions. Worth reported that this amendment had about one-third of the votes in the Committee stage and was not included into the bill. Ultimately the bill was passed and became the Civil Union Act 2004.

In 2007 Worth proposed a private members bill to address miscarriages of justice. However, the Ministry of Justice recommended to the Labour Government that they not adopt it. The Deputy Prime Minister of the time, Michael Cullen, wrote to Worth about his bill saying it was too broad and might have unwarranted constitutional and fiscal consequences, that the Government would not support it.

As Minister for Land Information, Worth introduced the Reserves and Other Lands Disposal Bill in 2008. This bill sought to correct historic oversights, errors or omissions relating to land status. It consisted of a number of specific reclassifications of land. The bill was ultimately enacted in 2015, after Worth had left Parliament.

In March 2009 he was reprimanded by his leader John Key for failing to mention that he was connected to a company that stood to gain from official visit to India. During the trip Worth both spoke on behalf of the Government and also arranged personal business deals. Worth did not consider there to be any conflict of interest. He later disengaged from his Indian business interests and stepped down as chair of the New Zealand India Trade Group.

=== Resignation ===
On 3 June 2009 Prime Minister John Key issued a press release announcing Richard Worth had resigned as a Minister. The press release stated that Worth had "advised me of some private matters in respect of which he felt it appropriate that he should resign as a Minister", and that Key would make no further comment about these matters.

The same day, the New Zealand Police issued a statement saying an allegation had been made against a sitting MP and that they were beginning a preliminary investigation. Key confirmed that Worth was the subject of a police investigation. Key would not say if the matter reported to police was the reason for the resignation, saying instead that Worth's conduct "[did] not befit a minister and I will not have him in my Cabinet,'' and had Worth not resigned he would have been sacked. The woman who laid the police complaint was never identified, with it only being revealed that she was a Korean businesswoman.

Key also stated that some weeks prior he had received a separate allegation that Richard Worth had "[made] a nuisance of himself towards women", which Key investigated and had received assurances that those allegations were not correct. This other accusation was presented to Key by then-leader of the Opposition, Phil Goff. The woman behind this allegation was revealed to be Neelam Choudary, an active member of the New Zealand Labour Party. According to Choudary, Worth first contacted her on 26 November 2008, and altogether, forty texts and sixty telephone calls ensued, continuing until 23 February 2009. Choudary, an ethnic Indian, alleged that she was offered a job as an ethnic affairs advisor or board member in return for romantic favours. She also alleged that inappropriate and vulgar telephone calls included asking her to buy transparent garments, and that his conduct was unacceptable and unwanted. Neelam Choudary herself faced scrutiny when it was later revealed that her husband, Kumar Akkineni Choudary, had been convicted the year before for his role in an immigration scam.

Worth declared that he was innocent of any crime. Prime Minister Key reiterated that there was no future for Worth within his Cabinet, and warned that suspension or expulsion from the National caucus was still a prospect. Worth resigned from Parliament on 12 June 2009 (effective 16 June 2009), citing that his role as a Member of Parliament was compromised due to "the avalanche of rumour and innuendo," and he wished to seek a new direction in international trade. After Worth's parliamentary resignation, Cam Calder took his place as the next eligible person on the current New Zealand National Party list.

In early July 2009 it was reported that the woman who made the original allegation to police had withdrawn her complaint and police dropped the matter. In November 2009, police announced that Worth would not face charges. As of July 2009, Choudary had not made the text exchanges public, though she sent copies of 34 texts from Worth, and her phone logs, to Key. Labour did not pursue the matter further. It was never publicly announced what caused Key to lose confidence in Worth and require his resignation.

== Post-parliamentary career ==
In October 2010, the Ministry of Foreign Affairs and Trade announced that Worth had been reappointed honorary consul to Monaco, a role he had held before entering Parliament. Monaco had appointed him to the role at least a year prior, but Foreign Minister Murray McCully sought legal advice on whether he could refuse the application and held up the appointment until approving it in October 2010. As of April 2020, Worth still held the role which has seen him attend the wedding of Prince Albert II to Charlene Wittstock.

Worth died on 10 May 2022.

== Notes ==
New Zealand Parliament
| Preceded by Christine Fletcher | Member of Parliament for Epsom; 1999–2005 | Succeeded by Rodney Hide |
Political offices
| Preceded by Rick Barker | Minister of Internal Affairs; 2008–2009 | Succeeded by Maurice Williamson (acting); Nathan Guy |
| Preceded by Judith Tizard | Minister Responsible for the National Library; 2008–2009 | Succeeded by Maurice Williamson (acting); Nathan Guy |
| Preceded by Judith Tizard | Minister Responsible for Archives New Zealand; 2008–2009 | Succeeded by Maurice Williamson (acting); Nathan Guy |
| Preceded by David Parker | Minister for Land Information; 2008–2009 | Succeeded by Maurice Williamson |
