= Ewen McQueen =

New Zealand writer and social commentator

Ewen McQueen is a New Zealand writer and social commentator who blogs at RenewNZ. From 2008 to 2018 he was involved in the National Party in the Epsom electorate. Prior to that was the leader of Christian Heritage NZ. McQueen has had opinion pieces published in newspapers around New Zealand and on the Stuff website. These include articles on family values issues, the Treaty of Waitangi, and New Zealand's Christian history.

== Early years ==
McQueen was born in Palmerston North in 1965, although spent most of his youth in the North Shore (part of the greater Auckland area). He attended Takapuna Grammar School where he played for the first XV and was head prefect in 1983. McQueen graduated from the University of Auckland in 1990. His primary field of study at university was economics, in which he gained a Master's degree with honours in 1990. As part of his post graduate degree he completed a thesis entitled "A Christian Perspective on Neo-Classical Economics."

After graduating McQueen worked in the health sector in analyst, planning and management roles. His last role was as Business Manager for the Facilities & Development Group within the Auckland DHB.

== Politics ==
Ewen McQueen was a member of the New Zealand National Party from 2007 until his resignation in June 2018 because according to McQueen "family values... leadership is not going to come via the National Party." McQueen was a member of the National party's 2010/11 candidate college and sought selection as the National candidate in the North Shore electorate for the 2011 general election, losing to Maggie Barry. He also unsuccessfully sought selection for the Epsom seat.

Prior to joining the National Party McQueen joined the Christian Heritage Party in 1992, and stood as a Christian Heritage candidate on five occasions. Four of his campaigns were in the Auckland electorates of Eden, Epsom and Mt Roskill, but his most successful election campaign was in the Taranaki-King Country by-election in 1998. In this by-election he polled ahead of both the NZ First and Green candidates. He also served as his party's Deputy Leader and Finance Spokesperson until 1999.

McQueen narrowly missed election to Parliament in the 1996 general election. He was ranked 4th on the Christian Coalition party list. The Coalition fell just under the MMP threshold.

In August 2003, McQueen was elected as the new leader of Christian Heritage NZ, and replaced the retiring Graham Capill. In October 2006, McQueen announced the closure of Christian Heritage NZ, blaming its demise on Graham Capill's criminal convictions, although he hoped to be involved with a new conservative Christian political party . That party did not eventuate and McQueen subsequently joined the National Party.

== Social commentary ==
McQueen has had a number of articles published on economics and social values issues in newspapers across New Zealand including The New Zealand Herald, The Christchurch Press and The Taranaki Daily News and Otago Daily Times. He has a blog site, 'renewnz'. McQueen authored a book entitled One Sun in the Sky, which argues 19th century Maori did not expect co-governance to result from the Treaty of Waitangi, and Te Tiriti validly ceded sovereignty to the Crown.
