= Christian Heritage Party of New Zealand =

Christian Heritage New Zealand
- Leader: John Allen (1989–1990); Graham Capill (1990–2003); Ewen McQueen (2003–06)
- President: Bill Van Rij, Henk Geerlofs, Nik Gregg (2003–6)
- Founded: 15 July 1989
- Dissolved: 3 October 2006
- Ideology: Christian democracy

The Christian Heritage Party of New Zealand (CHP, known for a time simply as Christian Heritage New Zealand) was a New Zealand political party espousing Christian values and conservative views on social policy. Although it never won seats in an election, it came close to doing so in 1996 as part of the Christian Coalition and briefly had a member in Parliament.

On 3 October 2006, the Party said it would disband to allow "new things to arise in Christian politics in New Zealand". This came after a highly publicised scandal which resulted in its leader, Graham Capill, going to jail for committing sex crimes against children.

== Policies ==
According to Christian Heritage New Zealand's self-description, the party aimed "to provide leadership that takes the initiative in building a culture that affirms marriage, strengthens families, and celebrates life as a precious gift of God. We believe these are the key issues that need to be addressed if we are to make an impact for the next generation."

It described its three key policies as "Affirming Marriage, Building Families and Celebrating Life", i.e. opposition to same-sex marriage and abortion and support of law and order.

The party espoused strongly conservative views on social policy. It favoured law changes to strengthen heterosexual marriage and to prevent same-sex marriage and civil unions. The CHP had an anti-abortion stance. For most of its existence, the party supported the re-introduction into New Zealand of capital punishment (abolished in 1989). Christian Heritage NZ supported restrictions on prostitution, as well as mandatory standards for television with a view to reducing violence and pornography. This conservatism extended to the exhibition of art and in particular two exhibitions held at the City Gallery in Wellington, the American's Robert Mapplethorpe in 1995 and Keith Haring in 1999. The Party held demonstrations including a ‘Rally for Righteousness’ outside the gallery and circulated petitions to have works removed. The Director of the City Gallery Paula Savage blamed the Heritage Party for low attendances at the Haring show with only 30,000 visitors against expectations of twice that number.

In economic policy, Christian Heritage espoused moderately right-wing policies, and stressed that "economic policy cannot be viewed in isolation" from social matters. In education the Christian Heritage Party emphasised parental influence over the curriculum and parents' rights to choose the school their child attended. The party supported victims' rights.

CHP supported New Zealand's constitutional monarchy. In foreign affairs, the party supported New Zealand's alliance with Australia and a resumption of its alliance with the United States. From the New Zealand general election, 1999, the CHP supported New Zealand's anti-nuclear policy, whereas beforehand it had endorsed return to the ANZUS alliance, but not necessarily the return of nuclear-armed ships.

CHP supported the Treaty of Waitangi and the work of the Waitangi Tribunal and urged settlement of Māori land claims and racial reconciliation.

Christian Heritage NZ claimed broad-based support from members of various Protestant denominations and from the Roman Catholic Church, although many of its past members appeared to have held membership of the small Reformed Churches of New Zealand, composed largely of conservative Calvinist Dutch immigrants. The party had long required its members to publicly declare themselves as Christians. Some commentators criticised this rigid confessional policy for supposedly limiting the party's base.

== History ==
=== Founding ===

The Christian Heritage Party of Canada was part of the inspiration behind the formation of New Zealand's Christian Heritage Party, and other influences also existed. Many of the party's founding members had Dutch ancestry and familiarity with the history of the Anti-Revolutionary Party, which functioned as an influential political party in Netherlands governments between 1888 and 1980, and many of the party's founding members belonged to the Reformed Churches of New Zealand.

Dirk Vanderpyl noted in his book Trust and Obey (1994) that many Reformed Churches of New Zealand members came from a narrow slice of Netherlands society, centred in Zeeland, Veluwe and Overijssel. In those Netherlands provinces, the Staatkundig Gereformeerde Partij (SGP or Political Reformed Party in English) had existed since 1922, and stood as a model for separatist Reformed fundamentalist political activism. The SGP differs from the Christian Heritage Party in that it restricts its membership to certain Reformed denominations, while Christian Heritage membership stood open to all evangelical Christians, although at first many of its office-holders had some association with the Reformed Churches. However, the SGP has only ever existed as a 'testimonial party'.

Also inspired by the Christian Heritage Party of Canada, the Christian Heritage Party of New Zealand emerged in 1989 to promote "Biblical principles" in politics, although the party's leadership generally claimed that its policies advantaged even non-Christians. Bill van Rij founded the party and became its first President; John Allen, former National Party candidate for Heretaunga, became its initial leader.

=== 1990 election ===
The party's first convention took place in 1990 and established the group's structure. In 1991 the party confirmed Graham Capill, a Reformed Churches of New Zealand pastor, as its leader. During the 1990s, some non-Reformed evangelical Christians repeatedly complained that the CHP took too long to transcend this initial base.

Eighteen Christian Heritage candidates contested seats in the 1990 general election. The Party did not gain any seats, but did secure over 10,000 votes across the country. In 1992 the party's candidate, Clive Thomson, finished fourth in a by-election in the electorate of Tamaki.

=== 1993 election ===
In the 1993 elections the Christian Heritage party stood 97 candidates and polled 2.02% of the overall vote, making it easily the largest party outside parliament, a position the party retained in the 1996, 1999 and 2002 general elections.

The Christian Heritage Party supported the ultimately successful campaign to change New Zealand's electoral system from first-past-the-post to mixed-member proportional (MMP). (New Zealand endorsed MMP in 1993 and has used the system in general elections from 1996 onwards.)

=== Christian Coalition and the 1996 election ===
In 1994, the Christian Heritage Party gained new competition when National Party MP Graeme Lee formed the Christian Democrats (originally named the "United Progressives"). Lee had originally considered joining Christian Heritage, but eventually declined because of the party's requirement that all members declare themselves Christians.

Later, however, Christian Heritage and the Christian Democrats reached an agreement to contest the 1996 elections together. This resulted in the formation of the Christian Coalition, with Capill and Lee as its co-leaders. Lee held the first slot on the group's "party list", since he already had a seat in Parliament.

Shortly before the election, much speculation occurred as to whether the Christian Coalition would reach the "five percent threshold" necessary to gain proportional representation in New Zealand's MMP electoral system. If the party gained more than five percent of the vote, it would gain entitlement to a share of parliamentary seats equivalent to its support, expected to amount to five or six MPs. Although the Coalition polled as high as 6.7% in polls before the election, in the final tally the Coalition won only 4.4% support.

=== 1997–1999 ===
In May 1997 the Christian Coalition collapsed, with the two component parties going their separate ways. Debate continues on the causes of this breakdown. According to the Christian Heritage Party, the Christian Democrats left the alliance; but other accounts disagree (either blaming Christian Heritage or blaming both). Points of contention included the extent to which the coalition would admit non-Christians who shared compatible views – after the split, the Christian Democrats would conceal the explicitly religious nature of their party, which they eventually renamed "Future New Zealand".

Shortly afterwards, Bill van Rij left Christian Heritage and joined the Christian Democrats, blaming Capill for the collapse of the Coalition. A number of other senior Christian Heritage members, led by a former Deputy Leader, Geoff Hounsell, also resigned or suffered expulsion from the Party: they joined the Christian Democrats following their unsuccessful attempt to have Christian Heritage agree to a merger with the Christian Democrats.

Christian Heritage stood Ewen McQueen as its candidate in the 1998 Taranaki-King Country by-election. McQueen outpolled candidates for the larger New Zealand First and Green parties.

Six months before the 1999 elections, Frank Grover, leader of the Liberal Party, a component of the Alliance, defected to Christian Heritage, giving it one seat in Parliament. Grover had entered Parliament as an Alliance list MP. High-profile broadcaster Philip Sherry also joined the Christian Heritage Party in 1999 and stood in the number 2 position on the party list

=== 1999 election ===
In the 1999 general election, Christian Heritage gained 2.4% of the vote, well short of the 5% threshold for entering Parliament, although enough to make it easily the largest party outside parliament.

=== 2002 election ===
In the 2002 election, Christian Heritage had high hopes. It appointed Australian political consultant (now New South Wales assembly MP for the Liberal Party of Australia) David Elliott, who is a prominent campaigner against Republicanism in Australia, as its campaign-manager. Party strategists hoped that by focusing on a single electorate, Wairarapa, CHP could gain entry to Parliament and bypass the 5% threshold-requirement. However, the result proved disappointing to supporters – the party itself gained only 1.35% of the vote, and its Wairarapa candidate, deputy-leader Merepeka Raukawa-Tait, came third in the Wairarapa poll. Christian Heritage's support defected to United Future New Zealand, a political party which had formed from the merger of Future New Zealand (a successor to the Christian Democrats) and Peter Dunne's United New Zealand Party in 2000.

A former Christian Heritage logo

=== Aftermath of the 2002 election ===
In the aftermath of the 2002 election, considerable tension existed between the party's central leadership and the Wairarapa branch. People alleged financial mismanagement against both sides, and Raukawa-Tait criticised Graham Capill's leadership of the party. Capill, in turn, criticised Raukawa-Tait, and rebuked her for her comments. Raukawa-Tait and the entire Wairarapa Electorate Committee eventually resigned.

Not long after the 2002 election Capill announced his retirement as party leader and took up a job as a police prosecutor. When Capill's retirement came into effect in August 2003, the Party appointed Ewen McQueen to replace him. The Party also re-affirmed its determination to carry on contesting elections (rather than remove itself from the list of parties and become a pressure-group). In 2003 the party adopted the name "Christian Heritage New Zealand", or CHNZ, replacing the original "Christian Heritage Party", or CHP.

In November 2004 Graham Capill resigned from the Party, citing differences of opinion about the Party's direction such as the dropping of capital punishment.

=== Graham Capill sex scandal ===
In March 2005, newspapers reported that a "prominent New Zealander" was "punched and left whimpering on the ground" outside the Christchurch High Court, where he was defending sex charges. The papers could not name the man because of a court suppression-order. On 1 April 2005 the court lifted name-suppression and the press revealed the man as Graham Capill.

Capill admitted the indecent assault of an eight-year-old girl on four occasions in 2001 and 2002, while he led Christian Heritage. Further charges of rape and indecent assault against girls aged under 12 (committed during the 1990s) followed.

As Capill had strongly condemned "sexual perversion" throughout his political career, the charges had a strong impact both on Capill and on Christian Heritage, which swiftly condemned his conduct. Newspaper-reports described Capill as "a sexual predator". Before sentencing, Capill emailed supporters asking that they pray for a light sentence and claiming the sex with one of the young girls as "consensual".

=== 2005 election and aftermath ===
In the 2005 general elections, Christian Heritage saw its support collapse even further. The party stood only seven candidates, and only won 2,821 votes (out of more than 2 million cast) or 0.2 percent. It appears that much of its support bled over to National, United Future, and the newly formed Destiny New Zealand. The loss of support to Destiny proved somewhat surprising, since Destiny has its base in a Pentecostal organisation, the Destiny Church, and McQueen himself has Pentecostal affiliations.

A campaign organised by the conservative Christian-influenced Maxim Institute called "New Zealand Votes 2005" may have become a factor in the Party's disappointing performance in the 2005 general election. The Maxim Institute portrayed the campaign as designed to inform voters. However, some commentators saw it as an ultimately successful attempt to persuade Christian voters not to vote for Christian Heritage New Zealand.

After the election, controversy arose when former CHNZ Policy Director Mark Munroe defended Capill in a private email, arguing that his serial paedophile offenses did not fit the "biblical definition of rape". Ewen McQueen and the CHNZ Board pressured Munroe for his resignation, which ultimately occurred.

CHNZ detailed the party's submission to Parliament's Electoral Law Select committee in May 2006. The Party urged the reduction of MMP's five per-cent threshold for list party representation without electorate seats, and abolition of MMP's one seat/list representation rule, which allows parties that have an anchoring constituency seat to gain parliamentary representation without having to clear the five-percent threshold. Following a further review of MMP, the reduction of the 5% threshold to 4% and abolition of the one seat/list representation rule was recommended to parliament, which has to date not adopted the suggested changes.

=== Disbanding and legacy of the party ===
On 3 October 2006, the Party announced that it would close down following a postal vote in which 97% of its members endorsed the move. Party leader Ewen McQueen said shutting down would allow a new Christian party to form. He blamed Capill's conviction and disgrace for the party's demise.

The main legacy of the party is the adoption by New Zealand of the mixed-member proportional representation electoral system, which the party supported. In addition the party was a catalyst for the formation of other niche religious or conservative political parties in New Zealand such as the Christian Democrat Party.

Although the party has been disbanded, it has continued to appear sporadically in opinion polls as recently as April 2013.

=== Electoral results ===
Election	Party	# of party votes	% of party vote	# of seats won	Government/opposition?
1990	Christian Heritage	9,591	0.53	0 / 97	Not in Parliament
1993	Christian Heritage	38,749	2.02	0 / 99	Not in Parliament
Mixed Member Proportional (MMP) electoral system since 1996
1996	Christian Coalition	89,716	4.33	0 / 120	Not in Parliament
1999	Christian Heritage	49,154	2.38	0 / 120	Not in Parliament
2002	Christian Heritage	27,492	1.35	0 / 120	Not in Parliament
2005	Christian Heritage	2,821	0.12	0 / 121	Not in Parliament

== See also ==
- Christian politics in New Zealand
- New Zealand political parties
