= Cam Calder =

New Zealand doctor and politician

Member of the New Zealand Parliament for National Party list
- In office 16 June 2009 – 20 September 2014
- Preceded by: Richard Worth (Note: Normally, list MPs do not have individual predecessors or successors, but Worth resigned during a sitting parliament and therefore was succeeded by Calder.)

Personal details
- Born: Campbell Gordon Calder; 1952 (age 73–74)
- Party: National
- Occupation: Doctor, dentist and sports administrator

Campbell Gordon Calder (born 1952), known as Cam Calder, is a New Zealand doctor and former politician. He was a National Party Member of Parliament in the House of Representatives from 2009 to 2014.

== Early life and career ==
Calder was brought up in New Plymouth by his mother; his father had died when he was six. He has two brothers and a sister. He was educated at Westown School, New Plymouth Boys’ High School, and the University of Otago, where he studied dental surgery. He undertook postgraduate study in dentistry at the Royal Australasian College of Dental Surgeons and—while running his own dental practice at the same time—retrained in medicine at Magdalene College, Cambridge University. During his medical study, Calder lost the sight in one eye through an accident. He was an emergency medicine doctor in England and, after returning home in the early 1990s, New Zealand. Immediately before his election to parliament in 2009, he was working as clinical research director for a medical and sporting equipment company.

Calder lived in France for a period beginning in 2001. He served as president of the French New Zealand Business Council and has also served on the international governing body for pétanque. He takes credit for being one of the people who "imported" pétanque into New Zealand. He represented New Zealand at the 1995 Pétanque World Championships in Brussels, Belgium; the team finished 36th.

He is married to Jenny and has two children.

== Member of Parliament ==
New Zealand Parliament
Years	Term	Electorate	List	Party
2009–2011	49th	List	58	National
2011–2014	50th	List	50	National

Calder became involved in politics in 2003, when he joined the National Party. He held various internal offices, including as chair of the North Shore electorate committee. He was involved in policy development for the party, proposing, unsuccessfully, at party conferences that the party develop a new growth measure to replace gross domestic product and taxation policy that included 100% write-offs for research and development.

In the 2008 general election Calder contested the Manurewa electorate and was ranked 58 on the party list. He lost his electorate and would have been elected as a list MP on the provisional results of the election, but the number of seats allocated to National dropped by one in the final count, preventing Calder from entering Parliament at that time. After the resignation of list MP Richard Worth in June 2009, Calder was elected in his place. Calder re-contested Manurewa in 2011 and lost, but was returned for a full term as a list MP.

Calder was a member of the law and order committee and the local government and environment committee during his first term. From December 2011 until February 2013, he was a member of the health committee and deputy chair of the justice and electoral committee. Thereafter until his retirement in 2014 he was a member of the transport and industrial relations committee and chair of the education and science committee. In 2012, Calder's private member's bill banning high-powered laser pointers in a public place was introduced into parliament; it became law in July 2014 with cross-party support.

Calder announced in October 2013 that he was going to retire from parliament at the 2014 general election. He was replaced as Manurewa candidate by Simeon Brown. After leaving Parliament, Calder acted as an observer in the 2015 Sri Lankan presidential election.

== Political views ==
Calder said he would vote "no" (that a smack as part of good parental correction should not be a criminal offence in New Zealand) in the 2009 New Zealand child discipline referendum. He supported increasing the purchase age for alcohol to 20 years. He voted in favour of the Marriage (Definition of Marriage) Amendment Act 2013. In 2021 he wrote an op-ed for The New Zealand Herald denouncing what he described as "the current, fashionable tropes of critical race theory, cultural Marxism and the denigration of colonisation" in the new New Zealand history curriculum.
