= Christian politics in New Zealand =

This article discusses Christian politics in New Zealand.

The monarch of New Zealand, who is New Zealand's head of state, is also the Supreme Governor of the Church of England. But the country itself, unlike the United Kingdom, has no official or established religion, and freedom of religion has been protected since the signing of the Treaty of Waitangi. As of the 2018 census, 37% of New Zealanders were affiliated with a Christian religion of some denomination, compared with 48% who had no religion, 9% who followed another religion, and 7% who objected to answering. There are a range of views on the extent to which Christianity affects New Zealand politics.

Chart of New Zealand Christian political history as of 2014, showing mergers, splits and renamings

During the nineteenth century, many church-oriented bodies sponsored and fostered several of the original European settlement-ventures in the period 1840–1850, notably the settlements of Otago (1848, Free Church of Scotland) and Canterbury (1850, Church of England)—and many evangelicals, fundamentalists and conservative Catholics see Christianity as underlying New Zealand's entire political system.

On the other hand, a notable politician of the late 19th century, Sir Robert Stout, had a considerable reputation as a freethinker.

Christianity has never had an explicit role in the major contemporary political parties, and the religious elements in these parties have taken varying forms, and cannot easily be classified as a single movement.

Māori Christianity, particularly the Rātana movement has often been of importance, with an historic alliance between it and the Labour Party signed in 1936, and many other parties now vying for their support, but this is generally regarded as a political rather than religious matter.

In the 1990s a series of Christian political parties such as Christian Heritage, the Christian Democrats, the Christian Coalition and Destiny New Zealand arose out of a Christian conservative strand in the 1970s and 1980s, mostly in reaction to a perceived decline of social standards; but none reached 5% of the vote in any election. To date, the same has been true of the New Conservative Party, New Zeal Party and Freedoms New Zealand, their contemporary successors in the 2020s.

== Before the 1970s: debates over prohibition and capital punishment ==
Before the establishment of major specifically Christian parties in the 1970s, evangelical or fundamentalist Christianity had had little specific effect on mainstream New Zealand politics in society. While the Baptist Union endeavoured to get alcohol-prohibition policies passed in the late nineteenth and early twentieth centuries, the Catholic Church urged its members to vote against such laws, concerned that the measures would outlaw wine for the Eucharist. A referendum on prohibition took place in 1919, but the return of demobilised New Zealand soldiers from World War I defeated the measure. Evangelical and Catholic New Zealanders did not respond as corporate institutions to the debates on capital punishment in New Zealand in the thirties, forties and fifties, but individual laypeople and clergy did make their opposition heard. The Anglican Church of New Zealand became more forthright in its opposition to the death penalty, and as the largest Christian denomination in New Zealand, it made its presence felt.

== Christianity within mainstream political parties ==
Neither the Labour Party nor the National Party, the two traditional dominant mainstream political parties in New Zealand since the 1930s, represent explicitly religious traditions. Nevertheless, both parties have occasionally contained people who saw their political mission in religious terms. A number of early politicians, both in Labour and in National, saw their respective political ideologies as an extension of "Christian values".

In the early Labour Party a significant sub-set of the party promoted what one might call "Christian socialism", claiming that "Christian kindness and charity" fitted socialism better than it did conservatism. New Zealand's first Labour Prime Minister Michael Joseph Savage is said to have personified Labour's "Applied Christianity". Labour won an overwhelming victory by presenting itself as the party of practical Christian compassion, in contrast to the "anti-family" depression-era coalition government. It was in this context that Savage—who would later return to his Roman Catholic roots—described Labour's Social Security Act (1938), intended to afford security for all New Zealanders 'from cradle to grave', as 'applied Christianity'.

A number of early Labour politicians had Christian backgrounds. One of the first leaders of the Labour Party, HE Holland (1919–1933), had been a street preacher with the Salvation Army in Australia prior to his migration to New Zealand. Savage's successor, Peter Fraser (1940–49), reflected in his personal life on the lasting impact of his Scottish Presbyterian upbringing, and the next leader, Walter Nash, was "an avowed Christian strongly committed to the Anglican Church". Subsequent Labour Party leaders also had church backgrounds. Arnold Nordmeyer, the leader of the Labour Party in opposition from 1963 to 1965, was an ordained Presbyterian minister. David Lange, (Prime Minister 1984–1989) was Methodist, while Norman Kirk (Prime Minister 1972–74) was raised by devout members of The Salvation Army.

Such church connections are also present in the National Party. For example, Keith Holyoake (Prime Minister 1957, 1960–72), was "brought up in a strict Open Brethren environment", and in later years was an irregular attender of the Presbyterian church. John Marshall (deputy Prime Minister 1957, 1960–72; Prime Minister 1972) was active in the Presbyterian church, while Robert Muldoon (Prime Minister 1975–84) was raised as a Baptist and continued as a church member until he married and became an Anglican like his wife Thea.

The National Party, the ostensibly more socially conservative of the two "major" traditional parties, apparently received increasing proportional support from religiously identifiable voters between 2002 and 2005.

Also, the Rātana movement has some influence in New Zealand politics (see Māori Christianity, below).

In recent times, however, religion has not usually formed a major component of either Labour or National platforms—and three of the last four prime ministers have described themselves as agnostic. Christopher Luxon, the opposition leader since 2021 and Prime Minister from 2023, is described as Evangelical. Michael Wood, former transport minister in the sixth Labour Government, is a practising Anglican.

== Evangelical political activism: anti-abortion activism in the 1970s ==
Beginning in the 1970s a significant increase in activism by New Zealand evangelical and conservative Catholic-based organisations occurred. Much of this opposed reforms undertaken by governments. In the 1970s and 1980s, two significant campaigns opposed the liberalisation of abortion rules and the legalisation of homosexual acts. Perhaps surprisingly, members of the generally conservative National Party (George Gair and Venn Young, respectively) championed each of these legislative measures. Organisations such as the Society for the Protection of the Unborn Child (now Voice for Life) and the Society for the Promotion of Community Standards (SPCS) served as a focus for Christian conservatism. Eventually, the conservatives won their initial battles against homosexual law reform, but lost their ongoing battle over abortion during the late seventies and early eighties. For more about the history of the New Zealand abortion debate, see abortion in New Zealand.

== Liberal Protestant activism: 1981–2001 ==
Mainline Protestant churches became involved with ending sporting contacts with South Africa during the apartheid era (c. 1948–1994), culminating when many liberal Protestants and Catholics participated in mass protests against the New Zealand Rugby Football Union's 1981 Springbok Tour of New Zealand. Shortly afterward, many of the same liberal Christians participated in the peace movement of the 1980s, which resulted in New Zealand becoming a declared nuclear free zone in 1987. During the New Zealand National Party governments of the 1990s, these liberal Christians became involved in organising against New Right cutbacks to social-welfare benefits (cutbacks supported by the New Zealand Business Roundtable, ACT New Zealand and similar organisations).

== Evangelical political activism: 1980s: moral activism ==
By the early 1980s, the Christian evangelical revival of the 1960s had developed into a social movement that utilised community and political action in response to "moral" issues. These developments were influenced by the emergence of a vocal Christian Right in the Reagan-era United States, represented by figures such as Jerry Falwell and Pat Robertson and groups such as the Moral Majority and Christian Coalition. As with their American counterparts, these conservative evangelicals opposed homosexuality, abortion, feminism, sex education, and supported traditional family and moral values. Opposition by conservative elements within mainstream denominations towards a perceived "liberal trend" led to a decline in church membership by 7 percent between 1976 and 1981. By contrast, church membership at more conservative denominations, such as the Pentecostal churches, rose by 127 percent during that period.

In March 1985, Labour's Fran Wilde introduced a new homosexual law reform bill. This became a moral issue for New Zealand religious conservatives to rally against. Two National members of parliament, Graeme Lee and Norman Jones, organised a petition against the bill; and three Labour MPs, Geoff Braybrooke, Whetu Tirikatene-Sullivan, and Allan Wallbank supported their campaign. A number of activists from the United States provided advice. At about the same time, the Coalition of Concerned Citizens (CCC) formed, using the motto "For God, Family and Country", while many liberal Anglicans and Methodists formed a "Christians for Homosexual Law Reform" network to counter their efforts. The campaign against homosexual law reform eventually failed, however, and the bill became law in 1986.

Like their American counterparts, conservative evangelical movements in New Zealand also tended to be strongly anti-Communist. One such activist, Barbara Faithfull, founder of the pressure group CREDO, alleged that Soviet Communists were using sex education, abortion, and homosexuality to undermine the "moral fabric" of Western civilization. Some conservative evangelical elements, such as Faithfull and the Coalition of Concerned Citizens, also joined forces with other right-wing groups in alleging that there was a conspiracy by Communist groups such as the pro-Moscow Socialist Unity Party (SUP) to infiltrate the Labour Party, the trade unions, and exploit various popular issues such as the anti-Springbok tour protests, the Māori biculturalism, and the anti-nuclear movement. In response to perceived Communist influence within these popular causes, some conservative Christian elements such as the CCC and former–Communist–turned–right-wing pundit Geoff McDonald supported maintaining ties with South Africa and preserving the ANZUS security alliance with the United States and Australia.

The CCC and another evangelical advocacy group, the Concerned Parents Association (CPA), also criticised the introduction of Māori biculturalism and multiculturalism into the education system as 'anti-Christian' for allegedly promoting alternative religious beliefs. The CPA and Geoff McDonald also criticised the National Council of Churches in NZ for allegedly creating a sense of guilt among White New Zealanders by highlighting historic issues such as Māori land confiscations during the New Zealand Wars. Several conservative evangelical periodicals such as Coalition Courier, Family Alert and Challenge Weekly were used to disseminate these ideas.

During the 1987 general election, conservative Christian elements including the Society for the Protection of Unborn Children (SPUC), Women for Life and the Coalition of Concerned Citizens tried to infiltrate the National Party by running conservative Christian individuals as candidates. Conservative Christian groups and periodicals, such as the Coalition Courier and Challenge Weekly, also attacked the Labour government's policies towards peace education, sex education, abortion, and Māori biculturalism. However, they met little success in this effort and the National Party leadership responded by quietly centralizing its candidate selection procedures. Increased evangelical political activism did, however, set the stage for the emergence of several evangelical Christian political parties during the next twenty-five years (see below).

== Evangelical parties ==
A number of New Zealand evangelical Christian political parties emerged in recent times:

- Christian Heritage Party (1989–2006)
- Christian Democrat Party (1995–1998)
- Destiny New Zealand (2007–10)
- Family Party (2007–10)
- Vision New Zealand (2019–) (initially to be Coalition NZ)

=== ONE Party (2020–23)/ New Zeal Party (2023–) ===
In June 2020, another Christian party called ONE Party was launched under the leadership of Stephanie Harawira and Edward Shanly. The ONE Party says that it wants to promote a Christian voice in Parliament.

== Māori Christianity ==
The first significant specifically Christian political party activity in New Zealand came at the behest of the Rātana movement. The Rātana Church, established by Māori spiritual leader Tahupōtiki Wiremu Rātana in 1925, gained particularly strong support from Māori of lower socio-economic status. The Rātana movement actively participated in the world of politics, and the first Rātana Member of Parliament gained election in a 1932 by-election.

In Parliament, the Rātana movement co-operated closely with the Labour Party, the rising force in New Zealand politics in the 1930s. In the 1935 elections, Rātana won two of the four Māori seats, and shortly afterwards allied itself with the Labour Party, which had won the election. The Labour Party and the Rātana movement have remained closely allied since this point, although the alliance has grown strained at times, and both National and the Māori Party also vie for their support.

=== Piri Wiri Tua Movement ===
In recent years at least one independent attempt has occurred to bring the Rātana religion to politics — the Piri Wiri Tua party, although not part of the Rātana Church, has strong roots in Ratanadom.

== Election results ==
Year	Candidate(s)	Votes	%	Rank
1990	Christian Heritage Party of New Zealand	9,591	0.53	9th
1993	Christian Heritage Party of New Zealand	38,749	2.02	5th
1996	Christian Coalition	89,716	4.33	7th
1999	Christian Heritage Party of New Zealand	49,154	2.38	8th
1999	Christian Democrat Party (New Zealand)	23,033	1.12	9th
Total		72,187	3.5	Lost
2002	Christian Heritage Party of New Zealand	27,492	1.35	8th
2005	Destiny New Zealand	14,210	0.62	9th
2005	Christian Heritage Party of New Zealand	2,821	0.12	11th
Total		17,031	0.7	Lost
2008	The Kiwi Party	12,755	0.54	10th
2008	New Zealand Pacific Party	8,640	0.37	12th
2008	The Family Party	8,176	0.35	13th
Total		29,571	1.3	Lost
2020	ONE Party	8,121	0.28	11th
2020	Vision NZ	4,237	0.15	12th
Total		12,358	0.43	Lost
2023	NewZeal	16,109	0.56	9th
2023	Freedoms New Zealand (Note: Umbrella party which includes Vision NZ)	9,573	0.33	11th
2023	New Conservative Party	4544	0.15	14th
2023	Leighton Baker Party	2,629	0.09	15th
Total		28,311	0.98	Lost

== See also ==
- Religion in New Zealand
- Family First New Zealand
- Politics of New Zealand
- Raven-Taylor-Hales Brethren (Exclusive Brethren)

== Bibliography ==
- J.Cocker and J.Malton Murray (eds) Temperance and Prohibition in New Zealand: the New Zealand Alliance for Abolition of the Liquor Trade: [Electronic Resource]: 2005:
- Allan Davidson: Christianity in Aotearoa: A History of Church and Society in New Zealand: Wellington: The New Zealand Education for Ministry Board: 2004. ISBN 0-476-00229-X
- Pauline Engel: The Abolition of Capital Punishment in New Zealand: Wellington: Department of Justice: 1977.
- Maureen Goring: "Lex Talionis and the Christian Churches: The Question of Capital Punishment in New Zealand" in James Veitch (ed) To Strive and Not to Yield: Essays in Honour of Colin Brown. Wellington: Department of Religious Studies: 1994: ISBN 0-4751101-3-7
- A.K.Grigg: "Prohibition, the Church and Labour in New Zealand: 1890–1914" New Zealand Journal of History: Oct.1981: 15:2: 135–154.
- Bruce Jesson, Allanah Ryan, and Paul Spoonley: Revival of the Right: New Zealand Politics in the 1980s: Auckland: Heinemann Reed: 1988. ISBN 978-0-7900-0003-9
- Brett Knowles: New Life: A History of the New Life Churches of New Zealand: 1942–1979: Dunedin: Third Millennium: 1999. ISBN 1-877139-15-7 (This book has gone out of print. However, a hardback, footnoted, version remains available (under a different title) from Edwin Mellen Press, New York (:http://www.mellenpress.com/mellenpress.cfm?bookid=1533&pc=9). Details are:
- Brett Knowles: The History of a New Zealand Pentecostal Movement: The New Life Churches of New Zealand from 1946 to 1979: Lewiston, N.Y.: Edwin Mellen Press: 2000:ISBN 0-7734-7862-0
- Dirk Vanderpyl (ed) Trust and Obey: The Reformed Churches of New Zealand: 1953–1993: Silverstream: Reformed Publishing Company: 1994: ISBN 0-473-02459-4
- Joanne Wood: A Challenge Not A Truce: The History of the New Zealand Women's Christian Temperance Union: 1885–1985: Nelson: NZWCTU: 1986.
