= Reformed Churches of New Zealand =

Christian denomination in New Zealand

- Abbreviation: RCNZ
- Classification: Protestant
- Theology: Confessional Calvinist
- Polity: Presbyterian
- Associations: International Conference of Reformed Churches
- Origin: 1953
- Congregations: 23
- Members: 3,663
- Ministers: 22
- Publications: Faith in Focus
- Official website: rcnz.org.nz

Reformed Churches of New Zealand is a Calvinist denomination in New Zealand. The denomination is constituted of 23 member churches, the first seven of which were formed in 1953. Total membership as of 2026 stands at 3,663.

== History ==
The Reformed Churches of New Zealand was founded in the mid 20th-century by Dutch and Boer immigrants who did not fit into the more theologically liberal Presbyterian Church. After the Geering controversy, where an ordained minister denied the divinity and resurrection of Christ, some conservatives left the Presbyterian Church for the Reformed Church, many immigrants from South Africa joined the Reformed Church in New Zealand.

== Form of doctrine ==
The doctrine of the Reformed Churches of New Zealand is expressed in the four confessions of faith to which it subscribes. These are the Heidelberg Catechism (1563), Belgic Confession (1566), Canons of Dort (1619) (known collectively as the Three Forms of Unity), and the Westminster Confession of Faith (1646). Also recognised are the Apostles' Creed, Nicene Creed and Athanasian Creed, all of which summarise the churches' doctrines.

The Reformed Churches of New Zealand is one of the few Calvinist churches internationally to subscribe to both the Three Forms of Unity (common among Reformed churches with origins in the European continent, especially the Netherlands) and the Westminster Confession of Faith (common among Reformed or Presbyterian churches with origins in the British Isles).

== Form of governance ==
The Reformed Churches of New Zealand hold to a federational system of presbyterian church governance. Each church has a ruling Session composed of (ruling) elders and one or more ministers (also known as teaching elders). Churches which have no minister are said to be vacant. Each church also has deacons who are charged with maintaining the temporal wellbeing of church members and with alleviating social distress. In larger churches deacons meet in their own deacons’ courts, while in smaller churches they meet together with the rest of the session. Only men are eligible to serve in the offices of minister, elder and deacon.

These churches belong to one of three regional presbyteries which meet three times per year to discuss matters of common interest and to provide mutual oversight. They also meet in synod once every three years to discuss matters of joint interest and to manage activities pertaining to the denomination. Rights of appeal to presbytery and synod are available.

== Constituent churches ==
Church	Year; Formed	Current Minister
Auckland Presbytery
Reformed Church of Avondale	1964	Andre Holtslag
Reformed Presbyterian Church of Bucklands Beach	1953	James Hyslop
Reformed Church of Hamilton	1953	Graeme Zuidema
Reformed Church of the Hibiscus Coast	2026	Freddy Minnee
Reformed Church of Hukanui	2002	Leo de Vos
Reformed Church of the North Shore (including a congregation in Maungakaramea)	1980	Daniel Wilson; Kevin Star; Aaron Warner
Reformed Church of Pukekohe	1989	Erik Stolte; Jae Kim
Wellington Presbytery
Reformed Church of Foxton	1984	Andrew Miller
Reformed Church of Hastings	1960	Peter Kloosterman
Reformed Church of Masterton (including a congregation in Greytown)	1987	David Stares
Reformed Church of New Plymouth	2023	Joshua Flinn
Reformed Church of Palmerston North	1953	Peter Haverland
Reformed Church of Silverstream	1967	vacant
Reformed Church of Wainuiomata	1975	vacant
Reformed Church of Wellington	1953	vacant
Reformed Church of Whanganui	2016	Nathaniel Rademaker
South Island Presbytery
Reformed Church of Bishopdale	1982	Matthias Schat
Reformed Church of Christchurch	1953	Damon Bosveld
Reformed Church of Dovedale	2001	Joshua Meinsma
Reformed Church of Dunedin	1955	Peter Yoo
Reformed Church of Nelson	1953	Braam Jansen van Rensburg
Reformed Church of Oamaru	2013	vacant
Reformed Church of Rangiora	2018	Ben McDonald

== Ecumenical contacts ==
The Reformed Churches of New Zealand is a member of the International Conference of Reformed Churches. Sister-church relationships are held with churches abroad which hold to similar doctrine and practice.

- Sister churches:
  - Presbyterian Church of Eastern Australia
  - Free Reformed Churches of Australia
  - Presbyterian Reformed Church (Australia)
  - Orthodox Presbyterian Church (USA)
  - Canadian and American Reformed Churches
  - United Reformed Churches in North America
- Churches in ecumenical fellowship:
  - Christian Reformed Churches of Australia
  - Reformed Churches in South Africa (Gereformeerde Kerke in Suid-Africa)
- Other churches with which contact is had:
  - Grace Presbyterian Church of New Zealand
  - The Korean Presbyterian Church in Oceania (New Zealand Synod)

== Worship ==
The churches hold worship services twice each Sunday and generally on Christmas Day, Good Friday, Ascension Day and New Year's Eve. Preaching from the Bible is the central element of worship. Preaching is by ordained ministers, or alternatively sermons written by an ordained minister may be read by a lay male session appointee when a minister is not available. Sung praise and corporate prayer are the next most significant elements of worship. The denominational psalter/hymnal, Sing to the Lord, is the main source of hymnody, in which the singing of the Psalms features strongly. Corporate confession of sin and the assurance of God's pardon are an integral part of Sunday morning worship, while in the second service one of the creeds is usually recited in unison.

The sacrament of the Lord's Supper (or Holy Communion) is celebrated at least three-monthly. The sacrament of baptism is administered to new converts and to the infant children of confessing church members.

== List of synods ==
No.	Year	Venue	Moderator and Vice Moderator	First and Second Clerks	Stated Clerk
1	1953	Wellington	E Dijkstra, Wellington; J W Deenick, Auckland	A van Gelder
2	1953	Auckland	J W Deenick, Auckland; E Dijkstra, Wellington	T Althuis
3	1954	Wellington	E Dijkstra, Wellington; J A Scarrow, Bucklands Beach	A van Gelder; F C Channing
4	1955	Auckland	B Boelens, Christchurch; J W Deenick, Auckland	F C Channing; P G van Dam
5	1957	Hamilton	J W Deenick, Auckland; E Dijkstra, Wellington	W In’t Veld; J Kleinjan	F C Channing
6	1959	Dunedin	J A Scarrow, Bucklands Beach; R J Venema, Dunedin	H van der Pols; P G van Dam	F C Channing
7	1961	Wellington	R J Venema, Bucklands Beach; J W Deenick, Auckland	P G van Dam; W van Rij	R J Venema
8	1962	Wellington	S Cooper, Christchurch; P H Pellicaan, Dunedin	D G Vanderpyl; R O Zorn, Hamilton	R O Zorn, Hamilton
9	1964	Wellington	R O Zorn, Hamilton; P van der Schaaf, Christchurch	A I de Graaf, Wellington; F C Channing, Nelson	R O Zorn, Hamilton
10	1965	Christchurch	G I Williamson, Mangere; P H Pellicaan, Dunedin	A I de Graaf, Wellington; F C Channing, Nelson	R O Zorn, Hamilton
11	1967	Avondale	H L Hoving, Silverstream; R O Zorn, Hamilton	A I de Graaf, Wellington; T E Tyson, Bucklands Beach	C J Reitsma, Wellington
12	1969	Nelson	C J Reitsma, Wellington; T E Tyson, Bucklands Beach	D G Vanderpyl; F C Channing, Nelson	D G Vanderpyl
13	1971	Wellington	H L Hoving, Silverstream/ Wainuiomata; A W Palmer, Mangere	W Wiersma, Christchurch; F W Kroon, Bucklands Beach	D G Vanderpyl
14	1974	Silverstream	W Wiersma, Christchurch; W A Davies, Bucklands Beach	D G Vanderpyl; H L Hoving, Invercargill	D G Vanderpyl
15	1977	Hamilton	G I Williamson, Silverstream; A W Palmer, Mangere	M Schwarz, Hamilton; L Reurich, Hastings	D G Vanderpyl
16	1980	Palmerston North	M Schwarz, Hamilton; J Goris, Avondale	J C Williams, Nelson; L Reurich, Kerepehi/Tokoroa	D G Vanderpyl
17	1983	Christchurch	P D Stadt, Christchurch; J E de Graaf, Bishopdale	B U Kuipers, Palmerston North; C A R Larsen, Dunedin	D G Vanderpyl
18	1986	Mangere	D J van Garderen, Bishopdale; P R Flinn, North Shore	B E Hoyt, Silverstream; L Draijer, Nelson	D G Vanderpyl
19	1989	Silverstream	W Wiersma, Hamilton; B Kroon, Christchurch	J A Haverland, Bucklands Beach; D J van der Vecht, Avondale	D G Vanderpyl
20	1992	Bishopdale	W Wiersma, Hamilton; J A Haverland, Bishopdale	M A Flinn, Pukekohe; B E Hoyt, Masterton	J Ploeg
21	1995	Avondale	J A Haverland, Bishopdale; M A Flinn, Pukekohe	B E Hoyt, Hastings; W L Walraven, Silverstream	J Ploeg
22	1998	Wainuiomata	J A Haverland, Bishopdale; G H Milne, Wainuiomata	B E Hoyt, Hastings; M A Flinn, Pukekohe	B E Hoyt, Hastings
23	2001	Palmerston North	M A Flinn, Dovedale; M A Capill, Bucklands Beach	S Bajema, Mangere; J van Rensburg, Bucklands Beach	B E Hoyt, Hastings
24	2002	Christchurch	W Wiersma, Hamilton; J A Haverland, Bishopdale	B E Hoyt, Hastings; W L Walraven, Silverstream	B E Hoyt, Hastings
25	2005	Hamilton	J A Haverland, Pukekohe; M A Flinn, Dovedale	B E Hoyt, Hastings; R H de Vries, Christchurch	B E Hoyt, Hastings
26	2008	Hastings	J H Rogers, North Shore; D J van Garderen, Bucklands Beach	P van der Wel, Hamilton; A Nugteren, Wellington	B E Hoyt, Hastings
27	2011	Bucklands Beach	B E Hoyt, Dunedin/Oamaru; P S Kloosterman, Masterton	P van der Wel, Hamilton; M R Willemse, Hamilton	P van der Wel, Hamilton
28	2014	Bishopdale	P S Kloosterman, Masterton; R J van Wichen, Bishopdale	J D van Dyk, Dunedin; M R Willemse, Hamilton	P van der Wel, Hamilton
29	2016	Pukekohe	P S Kloosterman, Masterton; R J van Wichen, Bishopdale	J D van Dyk, Dunedin; M R Willemse, Hamilton	P van der Wel, Hamilton
30	2017	Palmerston North	D A Waldron, Christchurch; J A Haverland, Pukekohe	P van der Wel, Hamilton; J D van Dyk, Dunedin	P van der Wel, Hamilton
31	2021/22	Hukanui	P S Kloosterman, Hastings; R Noppers, Bishopdale; A van Ameyde, Dovedale	J D van Dyk, Dunedin; T A Couperus, Rangiora	J D van Dyk, Dunedin
32	2024	Christchurch	R Noppers, Bishopdale; B J McDonald, Wellington	J D van Dyk, Dunedin; E E Havelaar, Christchurch	J D van Dyk, Dunedin

== Latest synodical appointments ==
- Standing committees
  - Child Safety Committee
  - Church Extension Committee
  - Church Order Committee
  - Financial Practice Advisory Committee (in abeyance)
  - Hymnal Committee
  - Interchurch Relations Committee
  - National Diaconate Committee
  - National Publishing Committee
  - Overseas Mission Board
  - Remuneration Committee
  - Synodical Interim Committee
- Study committees
  - Church Visitation Committee
  - Ministry Students and Vicars' Manual Committee
  - National Diaconate Review Committee
  - Overseas Mission Board Review Committee
- Other appointments
  - Stated Clerk
  - Deputies for Students to the Ministry
  - Synodical Archivist
  - Synodical Liaison to Calvinist Cadet Corps
  - Synodical Treasurer
  - Webmaster
  - Yearbook Editor
