= 2022 in squash =

This page covers important events in the sport of squash in 2022. Primarily, it provides the results of notable tournaments throughout the year on PSA tour, World, continental and national championships.

== PSA ==
This table show the most relevant events hosted by the PSA like PSA World Championship or World Tour Platinum events. For all remaining events check the main page.

=== PSA World Championship ===
| Event | Date | Venue | Men's | | Women's | | | | | |
| Event | Date | Venue | champion | runner-up | champion | runner-up | | | | |
|---|---|---|---|---|---|---|---|---|---|---|
| Men's & Women's | 13–21 May 2022 | NMEC; Cairo; Egypt | champion | runner-up | champion | runner-up | Ali Farag (EGY); 9–11, 11–8, 7–11, 11–9, 11–2 | Mohamed El Shorbagy (EGY) | Nour El Sherbini (EGY); 7–11, 11–7, 11–8, 11–7 | Nouran Gohar (EGY) |

=== PSA World Tour ===
Only platinum and gold events

| Event | Date | Cat. | Venue | Men's | | Women's | | | |
| Event | Date | Cat. | Venue | champion | runner-up | champion | runner-up | | |
|---|---|---|---|---|---|---|---|---|---|
| Houston Open | 4–9 January 2022 | Gold | Houston Squash Club; Houston; United States | champion | runner-up | champion | runner-up | Ali Farag (EGY); 11–6, 8–11, 11–7, 11–3 | Mazen Hesham (EGY) |
| Windy City Open | 23 Feb. – 2 Mar. 2022 | Platinum | University Club of Chicago; Chicago; United States | Paul Coll (NZL); 7–11, 10–12, 11–4, 11–7, 11–9 | Youssef Ibrahim (EGY) | Nouran Gohar (EGY); 15–13, 11–9, 11–8 | Hania El Hammamy (EGY) | | |
| OptAsia Championships | 6–11 March 2022 | Gold | The Wimbledon Club; London; England | Ali Farag (EGY); 4–11, 11–8, 11–8, 13–11 | Diego Elías (PER) | | | | |
| CIB Black Ball Squash Open | 12–17 March 2022 | Platinum | Black Ball Sporting Club; Cairo; Egypt | | | Nouran Gohar (EGY); 17–15, 11–8, 2–0, rtd | Nour El Sherbini (EGY) | | |
| GillenMarkets Canary Wharf Classic | 13–18 March 2022 | Gold | East Wintergarden; London; England | Fares Dessouky (EGY); 11–5, 13–11, 12–10 | Mostafa Asal (EGY) | | | | |
| Allam British Open | 28 Mar. – 3 Apr. 2022 | Platinum | Allam Sport Centre; Hull; England | Paul Coll (NZL); 12–10, 11–6, 11–4 | Ali Farag (EGY) | Hania El Hammamy (EGY); 11–9, 11–7, 8–11, 11–4 | Nouran Gohar (EGY) | | |
| J.P. Morgan Tournament of Champions | 1–7 May 2022 | Gold | Grand Central Terminal; New York City; United States | Ali Farag (EGY); 16–14, 9–11, 11–9, 11–5 | Diego Elías (PER) | Nouran Gohar (EGY); 11–7, 11–7, 11–3 | Amanda Sobhy (USA) | | |
| El Gouna International | 27 May – 3 Jun. 2022 | Platinum | El Gouna Conference & Cultural Centre; El Gouna; Egypt | Mostafa Asal (EGY); 11–8, 11–9, 11–5 | Paul Coll (NZL) | Hania El Hammamy (EGY); 11–2, 11–4, 8–11, 9–11, 4–11 | Nouran Gohar (EGY) | | |
| Necker Mauritius Open | 7–11 June 2022 | Gold | RMCLUB; Forbach; Mauritius | Diego Elías (PER); 11–2, 11–9, 11–8 | Mohamed El Shorbagy (ENG) | | | | |

=== PSA World Tour Finals ===
| Event | Date | Venue | Men's | | Women's | | | | | |
| Event | Date | Venue | champion | runner-up | champion | runner-up | | | | |
|---|---|---|---|---|---|---|---|---|---|---|
| Men's & Women's | 21–26 June 2022 | Mall of Arabia; Cairo; Egypt | champion | runner-up | champion | runner-up | Mostafa Asal (EGY); 13–11, 11–8, 11–7 | Paul Coll (NZL) | Nour El Sherbini (EGY); 11–6, 11–8, 11–5 | Nouran Gohar (EGY) |

== WSF ==
This section show the most relevant events hosted by the WSF and continental federations like World Team Championships or European, Asian... Championships.

| Event | Date | Venue | Men's | | Women's | | Mixed | | | | | |
| Event | Date | Venue | champion | runner-up | champion | runner-up | champion | runner-up | | | | |
|---|---|---|---|---|---|---|---|---|---|---|---|---|
| Pan American Ind. | 3–6 April 2022 | Asociación Nacional de Squash; Guatemala City; Guatemala | champion | runner-up | champion | runner-up | champion | runner-up | (Argentina) Leandro Romiglio; 11–3, 11–8, 11–3 | (Colombia) Juan Camilo Vargas | (Guyana) Nicolette Fernandes; 11–9, 11–4, 11–5 | (Colombia) Laura Tovar |
| Pan American Teams | 7–9 April 2022 | Asociación Nacional de Squash; Guatemala City; Guatemala | Colombia; 2–1 | United States | Colombia; 3–0 | Canada | | | | | | |
| World Doubles Champ. | 5–9 April 2022 | Oriam; Glasgow; Scotland | (England) Declan James (England) James Willstrop; 11–10, 11–6 | (Scotland) Greg Lobban (Scotland) Rory Stewart | (India) Joshna Chinappa (India) Dipika Pallikal; 11–9, 4–11, 11–8 | (England) Sarah-Jane Perry (England) Alison Waters | (India) Saurav Ghosal (India) Dipika Pallikal; 11–6, 11–8 | (England) Adrian Waller (England) Alison Waters | | | | |
| European Junior (U19) | 9–12 April 2022 | Squashtime; Eindhoven; Netherlands | (England) Finnlay Withington; 10–12, 11–9, 11–6, 13–11 | (Netherlands) Rowan Damming | (England) Katie Malliff; 11–5, 11–5, 11–5 | (Hungary) Hannah Chukwu | | | | | | |
| European U19 Mixed Team | 14–17 April 2022 | Squashtime; Eindhoven; Netherlands | | | | | England; 2–1 | France | | | | |
| European Team – Div. 3 | 20–23 April 2022 | Squashland Ljubljana; Ljubljana; Slovenia | Israel; 3–0 | Ukraine | Denmark; 2–1 | Portugal | | | | | | |
| Sudamericano U-19 | 25–27 April 2022 | Casal Squash Gym; Mar del Plata; Argentina | (Colombia) Juan Hernández; 11–3, 11–2, 5–11, 11–2 | (Argentina) Nicolás Meritano | (Ecuador) Mª Falconi; 11–3, 14–16, 11–5, 6–11, 11–4 | (Colombia) Mª Clara Ramírez | | | | | | |
| Sudamericano U-17 | 25–30 April 2022 | Casal Squash Gym; Mar del Plata; Argentina | (Ecuador) Javier Romo; 9–11, 5–11, 11–5, 11–8, 11–4 | (Colombia) José Santamaría | (Ecuador) Rafaela García; 13–11, 8–11, 12–10, 11–4 | (Argentina) Paula Rivero | | | | | | |
| Sudamericano U-19 Teams | 29–30 April 2022 | Casal Squash Gym; Mar del Plata; Argentina | Colombia; 6–4 | Argentina | Ecuador; 7–6 | Colombia | | | | | | |
| European Team – Div. 1 | 27–30 April 2022 | Squashtime; Eindhoven; Netherland | England; 3–0 | France | England; 2–1 | Wales | | | | | | |
| European Team – Div. 2 | 27–30 April 2022 | Squashtime; Eindhoven; Netherland | Switzerland; 2–2 | Hungary | Spain; 2–1 | Switzerland | | | | | | |
| European U17 Mixed Team | 12–15 May 2022 | Squashtime; Eindhoven; Netherland | | | | | Belgium; 2–1 | England | | | | |
| European U15 Mixed Team | 12–15 May 2022 | Squashtime; Eindhoven; Netherland | | | | | England; 2–1 | France | | | | |
| Sudamericano Individual | 24–26 May 2022 | Tortugas Country Club; Manuel Alberti; Argentina | (Colombia) Ronald Palomino; 9–11, 11–5, 11–5, 11–6 | (Brazil) Guilherme Melo | (Colombia) Laura Tovar; 11–8, 8–11, 11–4, 7–11, 11–9 | (Paraguay) Luján Palacios | | | | | | |
| Sudamericano Teams | 27–28 May 2022 | Tortugas Country Club; Manuel Alberti; Argentina | Brazil; 2–1 | Argentina | Colombia; 2–0 | Argentina | | | | | | |
| Asian Junior Individual | 15–19 June 2022 | Ambassador City Jomtien; Na Chom Thian; Thailand | (Pakistan) Noor Zaman; 11–9, 10–12, 11–5, 11–9 | (Malaysia) Joachim Chuah | (Malaysia) Aira Azman; 11–8, 11–3, 11–2 | (Hong Kong) Kirstie Wong | | | | | | |
| Bolivarian Games Ind. | 25–29 June 2022 | El Salitre; Bogotá; Colombia | (Colombia) Miguel Rodríguez; 11–1, 11–2, 11–4 | (Colombia) Juan Camilo Vargas | (Ecuador) Mª Paula Moya; 11–3, 4–11, 11–7, 10–12, 11–9 | (Colombia) Lucía Bautista | | | | | | |
| Bolivarian Games Teams | 25–29 June 2022 | El Salitre; Bogotá; Colombia | Colombia; 6–0 | Peru | Colombia; 6–0 | Chile | | | | | | |
| World Games | 13–17 July 2022 | UAB Recreation Center; Birmingham; United States | (France) Victor Crouin; 9–11, 14–12, 10–12, 11–3, 11–2 | (France) Grégoire Marche | (Belgium) Tinne Gilis; 11–9, 11–7, 11–6 | (United Kingdom) Lucy Beecroft | | | | | | |
| Commonwealth Games | 29 Jul – 3 Aug. | UoB Hockey & Squash Centre; Birmingham; England | (New Zealand) Paul Coll; 3–11, 11–9, 8–11, 11–8, 11–7 | (Wales) Joel Makin | (England) Georgina Kennedy; 11–7, 11–5, 12–14, 11–5 | (Canada) Hollie Naughton | | | | | | |
| Pan American Junior | 31 July – 3 August 2022 | Complejo de Squash de Sarco; Cochabamba; Bolivia | (Colombia) Juan José Torres; 11–6, 11–5, 9–11, 6–11, 11–7 | (Ecuador) Javier Romo | (Colombia) María Clara Ramírez; 11–8, 11–5, 11–5 | (United States) Caroline Eielson | | | | | | |
| Pan American Junior Teams | 3–6 August 2022 | Complejo de Squash de Sarco; Cochabamba; Bolivia | United States; 2–1 | Colombia | United States; 2–1 | Colombia | | | | | | |
| World Juniors | 11–16 August 2022 | Squash du Rêve; Maxéville; France | (Netherlands) Rowan Damming; 11–4, 12–10, 11–8 | (England) Finnlay Withington | (Egypt) Amina Orfi; 9–11, 1–11, 11–6, 11–3, 11–7 | (Egypt) Salma El Tayeb | | | | | | |
| World Juniors Men's Teams | 17–21 August 2022 | Squash du Rêve; Maxéville; France | England; 2–1 | Egypt | | | | | | | | |
| European Individual | 17–20 August 2022 | Sportwerk; Hamburg; Germany | (Switzerland) Nicolas Müller; 11–7, 11–4, 11–4 | (France) Victor Crouin | (Belgium) Tinne Gilis; 11–9, 11–9, 11–9 | (Belgium) Nele Gilis | | | | | | |
| European Club | 14–17 September 2022 | Centro Tecnico Federale FIGS; Riccione; Italy | (Germany) Paderborner; 2–2 | (France) Mulhouse | (England) Roehampton; 6W/0L; 12 points | (France) Mulhouse; 5W/1L; 10 points | | | | | | |
| Asian Team | 31 October – 4 November 2022 | Cheongju Intl. Squash Stadium; Cheongju; South Korea | India; 2–0 | Kuwait | Hong Kong; 2–1 | Malaysia | | | | | | |
| Nations Cup | 3–6 November 2022 | Trustpower Arena; Tauranga; New Zealand | | | | | England; 1–1^{(45–44)} | New Zealand | | | | |
| World University | 7–13 November 2022 | New Giza Sports Club; Giza; Egypt | (Egypt) Mostafa Asal; 11–5, 11–7, 11–8 | (Egypt) Moustafa El Sirty | (Egypt) Sana Ibrahim; 11–1, 4–11, 8–11, 11–8, 5–2^{rtd.} | (Egypt) Nour Aboulmakarim | [[|]] | [[|]] | | | | |
| Women's World Team | 10–16 December 2022 | Madinaty Sports Club; Madinaty; Egypt | | | Egypt; 2–0 | United States | | | | | | |
| Oceania Junior (U19) | 17–19 December 2022 | Thornleigh Squash & Fitness; Thornleigh; Australia | [[|]] | [[|]] | [[|]] | [[|]] | | | | | | |

== National championships ==
These are the winners of the most relevant national squash championships held during 2022.

| Country | Date | Venue | Men's champion | Women's champion |
|---|---|---|---|---|
| France | February 2–5, 2022 | SquashBad33, Bordeaux | Grégoire Marche | Marie Stephan |
| Germany | February 4–6, 2022 | Sportwerk Hamburg, Hamburg | Raphael Kandra | Saskia Beinhard |
| Spain | February 10–13, 2022 | Squash Santiago, O Milladoiro | Borja Golán | Cristina Gómez |
| Belgium | February 11–13, 2022 | Vlaams Squashcentrum, Herentals | Joeri Hapers | Chloé Crabbé |
| Ireland | February 18–20, 2022 | Fitzwilliam Lawn Tennis Club, Dublin | Sam Buckley | Breanne Flynn |
| Ukraine | February 19–20, 2022 | Club 5th Element, Kyiv | Dmitry Shcherbakov | Anastasia Kostiukova |
| Russia | February 25–27, 2022 | National Squash Center, Moscow | Vladislav Titov | Alesya Aleshina |
| Czech Republic | March 3–6, 2022 | Hector Sport Centre, Prague | Jakub Solnický | Anna Serme |
| Japan | March 4–7, 2022 | Yokohama Squash Stadium (SQ‒CUBE), Yokohama | Ryūnosuke Tsukue | Satomi Watanabe |
| Singapore | March 8–12, 2022 | Kallang Squash Centre, Kallang | Samuel Kang | Wai Yhann Au Yeong |
| Norway | March 25–27, 2022 | Vestlandshallen, Åsane | Trym Aasness | Madeleine Hylland |
| Romania | March 25–27, 2022 | Infinity Sport Arena, Bucharest | Vasile Hapun | Andreea Ghiorghișor |
| Canada | June 1–5, 2022 | Jack Poole Plaza, Vancouver | David Baillargeon | Hollie Naughton |
| Malaysia | June 8–12, 2022 | National Squash Centre, Bukit Jalil | Ng Eain Yow | Sivasangari Subramaniam |
| Finland | June 10–12, 2022 | Tali Badminton & Squash Center, Helsinki | Mahesh Mangaonkar (India) | Emilia Soini |
| United States | June 14–17, 2022 | Arlen Specter US Squash Center, Philadelphia | Timothy Brownell | Amanda Sobhy |
| Great Britain | June 15–18, 2022 | National Squash Centre, Manchester | Mohamed El Shorbagy | Jasmine Hutton |
| Poland | June 16–18, 2022 | I'm Fit, Łódź | Filip Jarota | Karina Tyma |
| Austria | June 17–19, 2022 | Heroes Squash, Graz | Aqeel Rehman | Jacqueline Peychär |
| Australia | June 22–26, 2022 | Darwin Squash Centre, Marrara | Rex Hedrick | Jessica Turnbull |
| Denmark | June 24–26, 2022 | Nørresundby Squash & Tennis Center, Nørresundby | Theis Houlberg | Caroline Lyng Christiansen |
| New Zealand | July 1–3, 2022 | Devoy Squash & Fitness Centre, Tauranga | Paul Coll | Joelle King |
| Portugal | July 16–17, 2022 | Lisboa Racket Centre, Lisbon | Rui Soares | Sofia Aveiro |
| Nigeria | August 9–13, 2022 | –, Abeokuta | | |
| South Africa | September 8–11, 2022 | tba, Cape Town | Dewald van Niekerk | Lizelle Muller |
| England | November 25–27, 2022 | –, Exeter | [[ ]] | [[ ]] |
| Italy | November 25–27, 2022 | Centro Tecnico Federale FIGS, Riccione | Yuri Farneti | Cristina Tartarone |
