= Squash at the 2023 Pan American Games – Men's singles =

Men's singles at the 2023 Pan American Games
- Venue: Racket Sports Center
- Dates: October 31 - November 1
- Competitors: 16 from 8 nations

Medalists
Gold medal	Diego Elías	Peru
Silver medal	Miguel Ángel Rodríguez	Colombia
Bronze medal	Leonel Cárdenas	Mexico
Bronze medal	César Salazar	Mexico

The men's singles competition of the squash events at the 2023 Pan American Games was held from October 31 to November 1 at the Racquet Sports Center (Centro de Entrenamiento del Tenis y Deportes de Raqueta) in Santiago, Chile.

== Format ==
Each National Olympic Committee could enter a maximum of two athletes into the competition. The athletes were drawn into an elimination stage draw. Once an athlete lost a match, they will be no longer able to compete. Each match will be contested as the best of five games. Unlike other events, there is not bronze medal match, so the two athletes that do not win during the semifinals receive a bronze medal.

== Schedule ==
Date	Time	Round
October 31, 2023	12:00	Round of 16
October 31, 2023	20:15	Quarterfinals
November 1, 2023	11:45	Semifinals
November 1, 2023	19:00	Final

== Results ==
The results were as follows

Round of 16
Diego Elías (PER)	11	11	11
Matías Lacroix (CHI)	1	2	0
Jeremías Azaña (ARG)	11	9	9	9
David Baillargeon (CAN)	7	11	11	11
Juan Camilo Vargas (COL)	11	11	11
Todd Harrity (USA)	7	6	5
Alejandro Enríquez (EAI)	7	14	12	6	2
Leonel Cárdenas (MEX)	11	12	10	11	11
Timothy Brownell (USA)	11	11	11
George Crowne (CAN)	8	9	9
José Tomás Gallegos (CHI)	5	5	8
César Salazar (MEX)	11	11	11
Leandro Romiglio (ARG)	11	11	11
Alonso Escudero (PER)	6	4	9
Josué Enríquez (EAI)	1	2	3
Miguel Ángel Rodríguez (COL)	11	11	11

Quarterfinals
Diego Elías (PER)	6	11	11	11
David Baillargeon (CAN)	11	3	4	5
Juan Camilo Vargas (COL)	6	7	5
Leonel Cárdenas (MEX)	11	11	11
Timothy Brownell (USA)	10	9	9
César Salazar (MEX)	12	11	11
Leandro Romiglio (ARG)	12	5	6
Miguel Ángel Rodríguez (COL)	14	11	11

Semifinals
Diego Elías (PER)	11	11	11
Leonel Cárdenas (MEX)	3	2	5
César Salazar (MEX)	5	8	7
Miguel Ángel Rodríguez (COL)	11	11	11

Final
Diego Elías (PER)	11	7	11	11
Miguel Ángel Rodríguez (COL)	4	11	5	4
