= Squash at the 2026 South American Games =

Squash competitions at the 2026 South American Games

- Venue: Rural Nave
- Dates: September 21–26
- Competitors: 60 from 9 nations

Squash competitions at the 2026 South American Games in Rosario, Santa Fe, and Rafaela, Argentina, were held between September 21 and 26 at Rural Nave, located within Parque de la Independencia in Rosario.

A total of 7 events were contested (three men's, three women's and one mixed). The games gave qualifying quotas for the individual events from the 2027 Pan American Games squash competitions.

== Medal summary ==
=== Medal table ===
* Host nation (Argentina)

Rank	Nation	Gold	Silver	Bronze	Total
1	Colombia	3	2	2	7
2	Peru	2	0	2	4
3	Ecuador	1	4	1	6
4	Paraguay	1	0	1	2
5	Brazil	0	1	3	4
6	Argentina*	0	0	3	3
7	Bolivia	0	0	1	1
7	Chile	0	0	1	1
Totals (8 entries)		7	7	14	28

=== Medalists ===
==== Men ====
Event	Gold	Silver	Bronze
Singles	Diego Elías; Peru	Matías Knudsen; Colombia	Jeremías Azaña; Argentina
Singles	Diego Elías; Peru	Matías Knudsen; Colombia	Ronald Palomino; Colombia
Doubles	Andrés Herrera; Matías Knudsen; Colombia	Álvaro Buenaño; Javier Romo; Ecuador	Diego Elías; Alonso Escudero; Peru
Doubles	Andrés Herrera; Matías Knudsen; Colombia	Álvaro Buenaño; Javier Romo; Ecuador	José Gallegos; Matías Lacroix; Chile
Team	Diego Elías; Alonso Escudero; Rafael Gálvez; Peru	Álvaro Buenaño; Javier Romo; David Costales; Ecuador	Jeremías Azaña; Miguel Pujol; Robertino Pezzota; Argentina
Team	Diego Elías; Alonso Escudero; Rafael Gálvez; Peru	Álvaro Buenaño; Javier Romo; David Costales; Ecuador	Diego Gobbi; Pedro Mometto; Yuri Pollak; Brazil

==== Women ====
Event	Gold	Silver	Bronze
Singles	Lucía Bautista; Colombia	María Moya; Ecuador	Laura da Silva; Brazil
Singles	Lucía Bautista; Colombia	María Moya; Ecuador	Fiorella Gatti; Paraguay
Doubles	Luján Palacios; Fiorella Gatti; Paraguay	Andrea Soria; María Tovar; Colombia	María Buenaño; María Falconí; Ecuador
Doubles	Luján Palacios; Fiorella Gatti; Paraguay	Andrea Soria; María Tovar; Colombia	Joaquina Llanos; Luciana Castillo; Peru
Team	Lucía Bautista; María Tovar; Andrea Soria; Colombia	María Moya; María Buenaño; María Falconí; Ecuador	Pilar Etchechoury; Paula Rivero; María Falcione; Argentina
Team	Lucía Bautista; María Tovar; Andrea Soria; Colombia	María Moya; María Buenaño; María Falconí; Ecuador	Laura da Silva; Renata Furletti; Thaisa Serafini; Brazil

==== Mixed ====
Event	Gold	Silver	Bronze
Doubles	David Costales; María Moya; Ecuador	Pedro Mometto; Laura da Silva; Brazil	Andrea Fuertes; Cristhiam Roldán; Bolivia
Doubles	David Costales; María Moya; Ecuador	Pedro Mometto; Laura da Silva; Brazil	Lucía Bautista; Ronald Palomino; Colombia

== Participation ==
Nine nations participated in the squash events of the 2026 South American Games.

- Argentina (8)
- Bolivia (6)
- Brazil (7)
- Chile (6)
- Colombia (6)
- Ecuador (6)
- Guyana (6)
- Paraguay (8)
- Peru (7)

== Results ==
=== Men's singles ===
Round of 32
Y Pollak (BRA)	3
C Roldán (BOL)	0
A Buenaño (ECU)	3
C Cifuentes (CHI)	0
M Pujol (ARG)	3
A Herrera (COL)	0
G Torrez (BOL)	0
P Mometto (BRA)	3
R Gálvez (PER)	3
S Ince-Carvalhal (GUY)	0
M Lacroix (CHI)	3
A Ríos (BOL)	0
J Romo (ECU)	3
N Verwey (GUY)	0
D Casarino (PAR)	0
R Palomino (COL)	3
D Gobbi (BRA)	3
J Gallegos (CHI)	1
D Costales (ECU)	0
A Escudero (PER)	3
D Ince (GUY)	3
A Acosta (PAR)	0

Round of 16
D Elías (PER)	3
Y Pollak (BRA)	0
A Buenaño (ECU)	1
M Pujol (ARG)	3
F Marcantonio (PAR)	3
P Mometto (BRA)	0
R Gálvez (PER)	0
J Azaña (ARG)	3
L Romiglio (ARG)	2
M Lacroix (CHI)	3
J Romo (ECU)	1
R Palomino (COL)	3
D Gobbi (BRA)	3
A Escudero (PER)	0
D Ince (GUY)	0
M Knudsen (COL)	3

Quarterfinals
D Elías (PER)	3
M Pujol (ARG)	0
F Marcantonio (PAR)	1
J Azaña (ARG)	3
M Lacroix (CHI)	0
R Palomino (COL)	3
D GObbi (BRA)	0
M Knudsen (COL)	3

Semifinals
D Elías (PER)	3
J Azaña (ARG)	0
R Palomino (COL)	1
M Knudsen (COL)	3

Final
D Elías (PER)	3
M Knudsen (COL)	0

=== Men's doubles ===
Round of 16
S Ince-Carvalhal (GUY); N Verwey (GUY)	1
J Azaña (ARG); R Pezzota (ARG)	2

Quarterfinals
D Elías (PER); A Escudero (PER)	2
J Azaña (ARG); R Pezzota (ARG)	0
A Herrera (COL); M Knudsen (COL)	2
F Marcantonio (PAR); D Casarino (PAR)	0
D Gobbi (BRA); Y Pollak (BRA)	1
A Buenaño (ECU); J Romo (ECU)	2
A Ríos (BOL); G Torrez (BOL)	0
J Gallegos (CHI); M Lacroix (CHI)	2

Semifinals
D Elías (PER); A Escudero (PER)	0
A Herrera (COL); M Knudsen (COL)	0
A Buenaño (ECU); J Romo (ECU)	2
J Gallegos (CHI); M Lacroix (CHI)	0

Final
A Herrera (COL); M Knudsen (COL)	2
A Buenaño (ECU); J Romo (ECU)	0

=== Men's team ===
Round of 16
Bolivia	0
Guyana	2

Quarterfinals
Peru	3
Guyana	0
Chile	0
Argentina	2
Brazil	2
Paraguay	1
Ecuador	2
Colombia	1

Semifinals
Peru	2
Argentina	1
Brazil	1
Ecuador	2

Final
Peru	2
Ecuador	0

=== Women's singles ===
Round of 32
B Saavedra (PAR)	2
J Llanos (PER)	3
P Etchechoury (ARG)	3
C Gallegos (CHI)	2
A Khalil (GUY)	0
M Buenaño (ECU)	3
A Fuertes (BOL)	0
M Falconí (ECU)	3
A Pinto (CHI)	1
A Soria (COL)	3
C Bernard (ARG)	3
T Serafini (BRA)	0
L Castillo (PER)	3
R Valverde (BOL)	0
K Gomes (GUY)	0
G Delgado (CHI)	3
M Tovar (COL)	3
R Furletti (BRA)	2
B Minchón (PER)	0
P Rivero (ARG)	3
M Fung-A Fat (GUY)	3
M Arnez (BOL)	0

Round of 16
L Bautista (COL)	3
J Llanos (PER)	0
P Etchechoury (ARG)	RET
M Buenaño (ECU)	2
L Palacios (PAR)	2
M Falconí (ECU)	3
A Soria (COL)	0
L da Silva (BRA)	3
F Gatti (PAR)	3
C Bernard (ARG)	0
L Castillo (PER)	3
G Delgado (CHI)	0
M Tovar (COL)	3
P Rivero (ARG)	2
M Fung-A-Fat (GUY)	0
M Moya (ECU)	3

Quarterfinals
L Bautista (COL)	3
M Buenaño (ECU)	1
M Falconí (ECU)	0
L da Silva (BRA)	3
F Gatti (PAR)	3
L Castillo (PER)	2
M Tovar (COL)	2
M Moya (ECU)	3

Semifinals
L Bautista (COL)	3
L da Silva (BRA)	0
F Gatti (PAR)	1
M Moya (ECU)	3

Final
L Bautista (COL)	3
M Moya (ECU)	0

=== Women's doubles ===
Round of 16
R Furletti (BRA); T Serafini (BRA)	0
M Buenaño (ECU); M Falconí (ECU)	2

Quarterfinals
G Delgado (CHI); A Pinto (CHI)	0
M Buenaño (ECU); M Falconí (ECU)	2
P Rivero (ARG); C Bernard (ARG)	0
L Palacios (PAR); F Gatti (PAR)	2
J Llanos (PER); L Castillo (PER)	0
M Arnez (BOL); R Valverde (BOL)	0
A Soria (COL); M Tovar (COL)	2
A Khalil (GUY); K Gomes (GUY)	0

Semifinals
M Buenaño (ECU); M Falconí (ECU)	0
L Palacios (PAR); F Gatti (PAR)	2
J Llanos (PER); L Castillo (PER)	0
A Soria (COL); M Tovar (COL)	2

Final
L Palacios (PAR); F Gatti (PAR)	2
A Soria (COL); M Tovar (COL)	0

=== Women's team ===
Round of 16
Bolivia	1
Guyana	2

Quarterfinals
Colombia	3
Guyana	0
Argentina	2
Paraguay	1
Brazil	2
Peru	1
Chile	0
Ecuador	2

Semifinals
Colombia	2
Argentina	1
Brazil	1
Ecuador	2

Final
Colombia	2
Ecuador	0

=== Mixed doubles ===
Round of 16
D Costales (ECU); M Moya (ECU)	2
D Ince (GUY); M Fung-A-Fat (GUY)	0

Quarterfinals
L Romiglio (ARG); M Falcione (ARG)	1
D Costales (ECU); M Moya (ECU)	2
A Fuertes (BOL); C Roldán (BOL)	2
A Acosta (PAR); B Saavedra (PAR)	1
P Mometto (BRA); L da Silva (BRA)	2
C Cifuentes (CHI); C Gallegos (CHI)	0
L Bautista (COL); R Palomino (COL)	2
R Gálvez (PER); B Minchón (PER)	0

Semifinals
D Costales (ECU); M Moya (ECU)	2
A Fuertes (BOL); C Roldán (BOL)	0
P Mometto (BRA); L da Silva (BRA)	2
L Bautista (COL); R Palomino (COL)	0

Final
D Costales (ECU); M Moya (ECU)	2
P Mometto (BRA); L da Silva (BRA)	1
