= Squash at the 2023 Pan American Games – Men's team =

Men's team at the 2023 Pan American Games
- Venue: Racket Sports Center
- Dates: November 3 - November 5
- Competitors: 24 from 8 nations

Medalists
Gold medal	Juan Camilo Vargas; Ronald Palomino; Miguel Ángel Rodríguez	Colombia
Silver medal	Robertino Pezzota; Leandro Romiglio; Jeremías Azaña	Argentina
Bronze medal	David Baillargeon; Graeme Schnell; George Crowne	Canada
Bronze medal	Diego Elías; Alonso Escudero; Rafael Gálvez	Peru

The men's team competition of the squash events at the 2023 Pan American Games was held from November 3 to 5 at the Racquet Sports Center (Centro de Entrenamiento del Tenis y Deportes de Raqueta) in Santiago, Chile.

== Format ==
Each National Olympic Committee could enter a maximum of a three-athlete team into the competition. The teams were drawn into an elimination stage draw. Once a team lost a match, they played matches to determine their final rank. Each match was contested as the best of three games. Unlike other events, there was no bronze medal match, so the two losing athletes during the semifinals received a bronze medal.

== Schedule ==
Date	Time	Round
November 3, 2023	12:15	Quarterfinals
November 4, 2023	10:00	Classification 5°-8°
November 4, 2023	12:15	Semifinals
November 4, 2023	17:00	Classification 5°-6°
November 4, 2023	17:00	Classification 7°-8°
November 5, 2023	10:00	Final

== Results ==
The results were as follows

Quarterfinals
Colombia	2
Chile	0
Canada	2
United States	0
Argentina	2
Mexico	0
Independent Athletes Team	0
Peru	2

Semifinals
Colombia	2
Canada	0
Argentina	2
Peru	1

Final
Colombia	2
Argentina	0

=== 5th-8th place ===
The following is 5th-8th place round results.

5th-8th place
Chile	0
United States	2
Mexico	2
Independent Athletes Team	0

5th place
United States	2
Mexico	1
7th place
Chile	0
Independent Athletes Team	3

== Final standings ==
Rank	Nation	Name
1st place, gold medalist(s)	Colombia	Juan Camilo Vargas; Ronald Palomino; Miguel Ángel Rodríguez
2nd place, silver medalist(s)	Argentina	Robertino Pezzota; Leandro Romiglio; Jeremías Azaña
3rd place, bronze medalist(s)	Canada	David Baillargeon; Graeme Schnell; George Crowne
3rd place, bronze medalist(s)	Peru	Diego Elías; Alonso Escudero; Rafael Gálvez
5	United States	Shahjahan Khan; Timothy Brownell; Todd Harrity
6	Mexico	Leonel Cárdenas; César Salazar; Arturo Salazar
7	Independent Athletes Team	Luis Quisquinay; Alejandro Enríquez; Josué Enríquez
8	Chile	Matías Lacroix; Agustín Carranza; José Tomás Gallegos
