= Squash at the 2023 Pan American Games – Men's doubles =

Men's doubles at the 2023 Pan American Games
- Venue: Racket Sports Center
- Dates: November 2 - November 3
- Competitors: 16 from 8 nations

Medalists
Gold medal	Juan Camilo Vargas; Ronald Palomino	Colombia
Silver medal	Leonel Cárdenas; César Salazar	Mexico
Bronze medal	Diego Elías; Alonso Escudero	Peru
Bronze medal	Josué Enríquez; Alejandro Enríquez	Independent Athletes Team

The men's doubles competition of the squash events at the 2023 Pan American Games was held from November 2 to November 3 at the Racquet Sports Center (Centro de Entrenamiento del Tenis y Deportes de Raqueta) in Santiago, Chile.

== Format ==
Each National Olympic Committee could enter a maximum of one pair athletes into the competition. The athletes were drawn into an elimination stage draw. Once a pair loses a match, they will be no longer able to compete. Each match will be contested as the best of three games. Unlike other events, there is not bronze medal match, so the two pairs that do not win during the semifinals receive a bronze medal.

== Schedule ==
Date	Time	Round
November 2, 2023	12:00	Quarterfinals
November 2, 2023	18:30	Semifinals
November 3, 2023	19:00	Final

== Results ==
The results were as follows

Quarterfinals
Leonel Cárdenas (MEX); César Salazar (MEX)	11	11
Matías Lacroix (CHI); José Tomás Gallegos (CHI)	7	6
Diego Elías (PER); Alonso Escudero (PER)	8	11	11
Robertino Pezzota (ARG); Leandro Romiglio (ARG)	11	5	7
Shahjahan Khan (USA); Todd Harrity (USA)	5	6
Juan Camilo Vargas (COL); Ronald Palomino (COL)	11	11
David Baillargeon (CAN); Graeme Schnell (CAN)	10	9
Josué Enríquez (EAI); Alejandro Enríquez (EAI)	11	11

Semifinals
Leonel Cárdenas (MEX); César Salazar (MEX)	3	11	11
Diego Elías (PER); Alonso Escudero (PER)	11	8	5
Juan Camilo Vargas (COL); Ronald Palomino (COL)	11	11
Josué Enríquez (EAI); Alejandro Enríquez (EAI)	10	7

Final
Leonel Cárdenas (MEX); César Salazar (MEX)	11	3	3
Juan Camilo Vargas (COL); Ronald Palomino (COL)	9	11	11
