= Squash at the 2013 Bolivarian Games =

Squash, for the 2013 Bolivarian Games, took place from 23 November to 29 November 2013.

== Medal table ==
Key:

* Host nation (Peru)

Rank	Nation	Gold	Silver	Bronze	Total
1	Colombia (COL)	6	1	2	9
2	Guatemala (GUA)	1	2	2	5
3	Peru (PER)*	0	2	4	6
4	Chile (CHI)	0	1	4	5
5	Paraguay (PAR)	0	1	0	1
6	Ecuador (ECU)	0	0	2	2
Totals (6 entries)		7	7	14	28

== Medalists ==
Event	Gold	Silver	Bronze
Men's singles	Miguel Ángel Rodriguez (COL)	Diego Elías (PER)	Alonso Escudero (PER)
Men's singles	Miguel Ángel Rodriguez (COL)	Diego Elías (PER)	Anderson Cardona (COL)
Men's doubles	Guatemala; Antonio de la Torre; Josué Enríquez	Paraguay; Carlos Caballero; Esteban Casarino	Colombia; Andrés Herrera; Miguel Ángel Rodriguez
Men's doubles	Guatemala; Antonio de la Torre; Josué Enríquez	Paraguay; Carlos Caballero; Esteban Casarino	Peru; Diego Elías; José Manuel Elías
Men's team	Colombia; Anderson Cardona; Andrés Herrera; Miguel Ángel Rodriguez; Felipe Tovar Pérez	Peru; Diego Elías; José Manuel Elías; Alonso Escudero; Gonzalo Seminario	Chile; Maximiliano Camiruaga; Jaime Pinto; Rodrigo Sauvalle
Men's team	Colombia; Anderson Cardona; Andrés Herrera; Miguel Ángel Rodriguez; Felipe Tovar Pérez	Peru; Diego Elías; José Manuel Elías; Alonso Escudero; Gonzalo Seminario	Guatemala; Bryan Bonilla; Antonio de la Torre; Josué Enríquez; Mauricio Sedano
Women's singles	Laura Tovar (COL)	Karol González (COL)	Ana Maria Pinto (CHI)
Women's singles	Laura Tovar (COL)	Karol González (COL)	Andrea Soria (ECU)
Women's doubles	Colombia; Karol González; Laura Tovar	Guatemala; Winifer Bonilla; María Barillas	Chile; Giselle Delgado; Ana Maria Pinto
Women's doubles	Colombia; Karol González; Laura Tovar	Guatemala; Winifer Bonilla; María Barillas	Peru; Alejandra Meza; María Paz Picasso
Women's team	Colombia; Giomar Flauteros; Karol González; Laura Tovar	Chile; Giselle Delgado; Ana Maria Pinto; Sandra Pinto	Ecuador; Mireya Espinosa; Nicole Espinosa; Domenica Romo; Andrea Soria
Women's team	Colombia; Giomar Flauteros; Karol González; Laura Tovar	Chile; Giselle Delgado; Ana Maria Pinto; Sandra Pinto	Guatemala; Pamela Anckermann; María Barillas; Winifer Bonilla; María del Pilar Fernández
Mixed doubles	Colombia; Giomar Flauteros; Anderson Cardona	Guatemala; Mauricio Sedano; Pamela Anckermann	Chile; Sandra Pinto; Rodrigo Sauvalle
Mixed doubles	Colombia; Giomar Flauteros; Anderson Cardona	Guatemala; Mauricio Sedano; Pamela Anckermann	Peru; Claudia Suárez; Alonso Escudero
