= Squash at the 2026 Central American and Caribbean Games =

- Venue: Ágora Mall
- Location: Santo Domingo, Dominican Republic
- Dates: 2–7 August

The squash competition at the 2026 Central American and Caribbean Games was held in Santo Domingo, Dominican Republic, from 2 to 7 August 2026 at the Ágora Mall.

== Participating nations ==
A total of 11 nations qualified athletes. The number of athletes a nation entered is in parentheses beside the name of the country.

- Barbados (6)
- Bermuda (6)
- British Virgin Islands (3)
- Cayman Islands (3)
- Colombia (6)
- Dominican Republic (6)
- Guatemala (6)
- Guyana (6)
- Jamaica (3)
- Mexico (6)
- Trinidad and Tobago (3)

== Medal table ==
* Host nation (Dominican Republic)

Rank	Nation	Gold	Silver	Bronze	Total
1	Colombia (COL)	3	3	3	9
2	Mexico (MEX)	2	1	2	5
3	Barbados (BAR)	2	1	1	4
4	Guatemala (GUA)	0	1	5	6
5	Guyana (GUY)	0	1	1	2
6	Cayman Islands (CAY)	0	0	1	1
6	Jamaica (JAM)	0	0	1	1
Totals (7 entries)		7	7	14	28

== Medal summary ==
Event	Gold	Silver	Bronze
Men's singles	Leonel Cárdenas; Mexico	Miguel Ángel Rodríguez; Colombia	Alejandro Enríquez; Guatemala
Men's singles	Leonel Cárdenas; Mexico	Miguel Ángel Rodríguez; Colombia	Juan Camilo Vargas; Colombia
Women's singles	Margot Prow; Barbados	Meagan Best; Barbados	Lucía Bautista; Colombia
Women's singles	Margot Prow; Barbados	Meagan Best; Barbados	Laura Tovar; Colombia
Men's doubles	Colombia; Juan Camilo Vargas; Matías Knudsen	Guatemala; Josué Enríquez; Alejandro Enríquez	Mexico; César Salazar; Leonel Cárdenas
Men's doubles	Colombia; Juan Camilo Vargas; Matías Knudsen	Guatemala; Josué Enríquez; Alejandro Enríquez	Jamaica; Julian Morrison; Tahjia Lumley
Women's doubles	Colombia; Laura Tovar; María Tovar	Guyana; Ashley Khalil; Mary Fung-A-Fat	Guatemala; Tabita Gaitán; Darlyn Sandoval
Women's doubles	Colombia; Laura Tovar; María Tovar	Guyana; Ashley Khalil; Mary Fung-A-Fat	Cayman Islands; Lara Conolly; Jade Pitcairn
Mixed doubles	Mexico; Alfredo Ávila; Sarahí López	Colombia; Lucía Bautista; Miguel Ángel Rodríguez	Guatemala; José Toscano; Winifer Bonilla
Mixed doubles	Mexico; Alfredo Ávila; Sarahí López	Colombia; Lucía Bautista; Miguel Ángel Rodríguez	Guyana; Kirsten Gomes; Jason-Ray Khalil
Men's team	Colombia; Miguel Ángel Rodríguez; Juan Camilo Vargas; Matías Knudsen	Mexico; Leonel Cárdenas; Alfredo Ávila; César Salazar	Barbados; Darien Benn; Khamal Cumberbatch; Shawn Simpson
Men's team	Colombia; Miguel Ángel Rodríguez; Juan Camilo Vargas; Matías Knudsen	Mexico; Leonel Cárdenas; Alfredo Ávila; César Salazar	Guatemala; Alejandro Enríquez; Josué Enríquez; José Toscano
Women's team	Barbados; Margot Prow; Meagan Best; Amanda Haywood	Colombia; Lucía Bautista; Laura Tovar; María Tovar	Mexico; Diana García; Sarahí López; Abda Mondragón
Women's team	Barbados; Margot Prow; Meagan Best; Amanda Haywood	Colombia; Lucía Bautista; Laura Tovar; María Tovar	Guatemala; Tabita Gaitán; Darlyn Sandoval; Winifer Bonilla
