= Squash at the 2015 Pan American Games – Men's doubles =

Squash – Men's doubles at the 2015 Pan American Games
- Venue: Exhibition Centre – Hall C
- Dates: July 13–14
- Competitors: 20 from 10 nations

Medalists
Gold medal	Andrés Herrera; Juan Camilo Vargas	Colombia
Silver medal	Andrew Schnell; Graeme Schnell	Canada
Bronze medal	Andrés Duany; Diego Elías	Peru
Bronze medal	Christopher Gordon; Christopher Hanson	United States

The men's doubles squash event of the 2015 Pan American Games was held from July 13–14 at the Exhibition Centre in Toronto. Andrés Herrera and Juan Camilo Vargas of Colombia became the champions. The defending Pan American Games champion were Arturo Salazar and Eric Gálvez of Mexico, who were eliminated in the quarterfinals by the eventual runners-up and brothers Andrew Schnell and Graeme Schnell.

== Schedule ==
All times are Central Standard Time (UTC-6).

Date	Time	Round
July 13, 2015	9:07	First Round
July 13, 2015	12:06	Quarterfinals
July 13, 2015	20:36	Semifinals
July 14, 2015	20:42	Final

== Results ==
=== Finals ===
Semifinals
Andrés Herrera (Colombia) Juan Camilo Vargas (COL)	11	11
Andrés Duany (Peru) Diego Elías (PER)	5	2
Christopher Gordon (United States) Christopher Hanson (USA)	10	6
Andrew Schnell (Canada) Graeme Schnell (CAN)	11	11

Final
Andrés Herrera (Colombia) Juan Camilo Vargas (COL)	11	11
Andrew Schnell (Canada) Graeme Schnell (CAN)	6	3

=== Top half ===
First Round				Quarterfinals				Semifinals
				R Pezzota (Argentina) L Romiglio (ARG)	11	6	4
J Chacon (Ecuador) E Davila (ECU)	11	2	7	A Herrera (Colombia) J Vargas (COL)	8	11	11
A Herrera (Colombia) J Vargas (COL)	9	11	11					A Herrera (Colombia) J Vargas (COL)	11	11
								A Duany (Peru) D Elías (PER)	5	2
				M Camiruaga (Chile) S Gallegos (CHI)	4	7
				A Duany (Peru) D Elías (PER)	11	11

=== Bottom half ===
First Round			Quarterfinals				Semifinals
			C Gordon (United States) C Hanson (USA)	11	11
			B Bonilla (Guatemala) J Enríquez (GUA)	10	7
							C Gordon (United States) C Hanson (USA)	10	6
A Schnell (Canada) G Schnell (CAN)	11	11					A Schnell (Canada) G Schnell (CAN)	11	11
K Jeffrey (Guyana) J-R Khalil (GUY)	5	4	A Schnell (Canada) G Schnell (CAN)	11	10	11
			E Gálvez (Mexico) A Salazar (MEX)	8	11	10

== Final standings ==
Rank	Name	Nation
1st place, gold medalist(s)	Andrés Herrera; Juan Camilo Vargas	Colombia
2nd place, silver medalist(s)	Andrew Schnell; Graeme Schnell	Canada
3rd place, bronze medalist(s)	Andrés Duany; Diego Elías	Peru
3rd place, bronze medalist(s)	Christopher Gordon; Christopher Hanson	United States
5	Robertino Pezzota; Leandro Romiglio	Argentina
5	Maximiliano Camiruaga; Sebastián Gallegos	Chile
5	Bryan Bonilla; Josué Enríquez	Guatemala
5	Eric Gálvez; Arturo Salazar	Mexico
9	Juan Chacon; Ernesto Davila	Ecuador
9	Kristian Jeffrey; Jason-Ray Khalil	Guyana
