= Squash at the 2018 Central American and Caribbean Games =

- Venue: Club Campestre de Cali
- Location: (Colombia) Cali
- Dates: 20–26 July

The squash competition at the 2018 Central American and Caribbean Games was held from 20 to 26 July at the Club Campestre de Cali in Cali, Colombia.

== Medal summary ==
=== Men's events ===
Event	Gold	Silver	Bronze
Singles	Miguel Ángel Rodríguez (COL)	César Salazar (MEX)	Christopher Binnie (JAM) Arturo Salazar (MEX)
Doubles	Mexico (MEX); Arturo Salazar; César Salazar	Colombia (COL); Andrés Herrera; Juan Camilo Vargas	Bermuda (BER); Noah Browne; Micah Franklin Guatemala (GUA); Alejandro Enríquez; Josué Enríquez
Team	Mexico (MEX); Alfredo Ávila; Arturo Salazar; César Salazar	Colombia (COL); Andrés Herrera; Miguel Ángel Rodríguez; Juan Camilo Vargas	Guatemala (GUA); Alejandro Enríquez; Josué Enríquez; José Toscano Jamaica (JAM); Christopher Binnie; Bruce Burrowes; Lewis Walters

=== Women's events ===
Event	Gold	Silver	Bronze
Singles	Samantha Terán (MEX)	Diana García (MEX)	Catalina Peláez (COL) Laura Tovar (COL)
Doubles	Colombia (COL); Laura Tovar; María Tovar	Mexico (MEX); Diana García; Samantha Terán	Cayman Islands (CAY); Eilidh Bridgeman; Jade Pitcairn Guyana (GUY); Nicolette Fernandes; Ashley Khalil
Team	Mexico (MEX); Dina Anguiano; Diana García; Samantha Terán	Colombia (COL); Catalina Peláez; Laura Tovar; María Tovar	Barbados (BAR); Meagan Best; Amanda Haywood; Jada Smith-Padmore Cayman Islands (CAY); Eilidh Bridgeman; Jade Pitcairn; Marlene West

=== Mixed events ===
Event	Gold	Silver	Bronze
Doubles	Mexico (MEX); Alfredo Ávila; Diana García	Colombia (COL); Catalina Peláez; Miguel Ángel Rodríguez	Cayman Islands (CAY); Cameron Stafford; Marlene West Guatemala (GUA); Winifer Bonilla; José Toscano

== Medal table ==
* Host nation (Colombia)

Rank	Nation	Gold	Silver	Bronze	Total
1	Mexico (MEX)	5	3	1	9
2	Colombia (COL)*	2	4	2	8
3	Cayman Islands (CAY)	0	0	3	3
3	Guatemala (GUA)	0	0	3	3
5	Jamaica (JAM)	0	0	2	2
6	Barbados (BAR)	0	0	1	1
6	Bermuda (BER)	0	0	1	1
6	Guyana (GUY)	0	0	1	1
Totals (8 entries)		7	7	14	28
