= Squash at the 2022 South American Games =

Squash competitions at the 2022 South American Games

- Venue: El Centro Nacional de Squash
- Dates: October 10−15
- Nations: 9

Squash competitions at the 2022 South American Games in Asunción, Paraguay are scheduled to be held between October 10 and 15, 2022 at the El Centro Nacional de Squash.

== Schedule ==
The competition schedule is as follows:

| P | Preliminary round | F | Final |

| Date Event | Mon 10 | Tue 11 | Wed 12 | Thu 13 | Fri 14 | Sat 15 |
|---|---|---|---|---|---|---|
| Men's singles | P | P | F | | | |
| Men's doubles | | P | P | F | | |
| Men's team | | | | P | P | F |
| Women's singles | P | P | F | | | |
| Women's doubles | | P | P | F | | |
| Women's team | | | | P | P | F |
| Mixed doubles | | P | P | F | | |

== Medal summary ==
=== Medal table ===
* Host nation (Paraguay)

| Rank | Nation | Gold | Silver | Bronze | Total |
|---|---|---|---|---|---|
| 1 | Colombia (COL) | 5 | 1 | 2 | 8 |
| 2 | Argentina (ARG) | 2 | 1 | 4 | 7 |
| 3 | Ecuador (ECU) | 0 | 1 | 4 | 5 |
| 4 | Brazil (BRA) | 0 | 1 | 1 | 2 |
| 4 | Paraguay (PAR)* | 0 | 1 | 1 | 2 |
| 6 | Guyana (GUY) | 0 | 1 | 0 | 1 |
| 6 | Peru (PER) | 0 | 1 | 0 | 1 |
| 8 | Chile (CHI) | 0 | 0 | 2 | 2 |
| Totals (8 entries) | | 7 | 7 | 14 | 28 |

=== Medalists ===
==== Men ====
| Event | Gold | Silver | Bronze |
|---|---|---|---|
| Men's singles | Leandro Romiglio; Argentina | Ronald Palomino; Colombia | Robertino Pezzota; Argentina |
| Men's singles | Leandro Romiglio; Argentina | Ronald Palomino; Colombia | Juan Camilo Vargas; Colombia |
| Men's doubles | Andrés Herrera; Juan Camilo Vargas; Colombia | Alonso Escudero; Rafael Gálvez; Peru | Jeremías Azaña; Robertino Pezzota; Argentina |
| Men's doubles | Andrés Herrera; Juan Camilo Vargas; Colombia | Alonso Escudero; Rafael Gálvez; Peru | Diego Gobbi; Pedro Mometto; Brazil |
| Men's team | Federico Cioffi; Jeremías Azaña; Leandro Romiglio; Robertino Pezzota; Argentina | Diego Gobbi; Guilherme Farnezi; Pedro Mometto; Brazil | Andrés Herrera; Juan Camilo Vargas; Ronald Palomino; Colombia |
| Men's team | Federico Cioffi; Jeremías Azaña; Leandro Romiglio; Robertino Pezzota; Argentina | Diego Gobbi; Guilherme Farnezi; Pedro Mometto; Brazil | Alvaro Buenaño; David Costales; Javier Romo; Ecuador |

==== Women ====
| Event | Gold | Silver | Bronze |
|---|---|---|---|
| Women's singles | Laura Tovar; Colombia | Nicolette Fernandes; Guyana | María Moya; Ecuador |
| Women's singles | Laura Tovar; Colombia | Nicolette Fernandes; Guyana | Lújan Palacios; Paraguay |
| Women's doubles | Laura Tovar; María Tovar; Colombia | María Buenaño; María Moya; Ecuador | Pilar Etchechoury; Valentina Portieri; Argentina |
| Women's doubles | Laura Tovar; María Tovar; Colombia | María Buenaño; María Moya; Ecuador | Ana Pinto; Giselle Delgado; Chile |
| Women's team | Andrea Soria; Laura Tovar; Lucía Bautista; María Tovar; Colombia | Antonella Falcione; Pilar Etchechoury; Valentina Portieri; Argentina | Ana Pinto; Camila Gallegos; Giselle Delgado; Chile |
| Women's team | Andrea Soria; Laura Tovar; Lucía Bautista; María Tovar; Colombia | Antonella Falcione; Pilar Etchechoury; Valentina Portieri; Argentina | María Buenaño; María Moya; Rafaela Albuja; Ecuador |

==== Mixed ====
| Event | Gold | Silver | Bronze |
|---|---|---|---|
| Mixed doubles | Lucía Bautista; Ronald Palomino; Colombia | Francesco Marcantonio; Luján Palacios; Paraguay | Antonella Falcione; Leandro Romiglio; Argentina |
| Mixed doubles | Lucía Bautista; Ronald Palomino; Colombia | Francesco Marcantonio; Luján Palacios; Paraguay | Javier Romo; Rafaela Albuja; Ecuador |

== Participation ==
Nine nations will participate in squash of the 2022 South American Games.

- Argentina
- Bolivia
- Brazil
- Chile
- Colombia
- Ecuador
- Guyana
- Paraguay
- Peru
