= 2025 Men's British Open Squash Championship =

Squash tournament

British Open
- 86th Men's British Open

Details
- Event name: 2025 British Open
- Location: Solihull and Birmingham, England
- Venue: Solihull Arden Club; Birmingham Rep
- Dates: 27 May to 8 June 2025

Men's Winner
- Prize money: $348,500
- Year: 2024–25 PSA World Tour

The Men's 2025 British Open was the 86th men's edition of the 2025 British Open Squash Championships, which is a 2024–25 PSA World Tour event. The event took place at the Solihull Arden Club and the Birmingham Repertory Theatre in England between 27 May and 8 June 2025.

Diego Elías defeated defending champion Mostafa Asal in the final to win the title for the first time.

== Draw and results ==
=== Semi-finals and final ===
Semi-finals
1	(Egypt) Mostafa Asal	4	13	11	11
4	(Wales) Joel Makin	11	11	8	7
3	(New Zealand) Paul Coll	6	9	5
2	(Peru) Diego Elías	11	11	11

Final
1	(Egypt) Asal	4	9	11	4
2	(Peru) Elías	11	11	3	11

=== Main Draw ===
==== Top half ====
First round
1	(Egypt) Mostafa Asal
[Bye]
(England) Jonah Bryant	11	11	11
(India) Velavan Senthilkumar	8	5	5
(Egypt) Mohamed Abouelghar	8	11	11	9	2
(England) Patrick Rooney	11	8	5	11	11
(Wales) Emyr Evans	7	5	2
(Colombia) Miguel Rodríguez	11	11	11
(Hungary) Balázs Farkas	11	5	9	9
(England) Sam Todd	7	11	11	11
(Egypt) Kareem El Torkey	11	11	11
(Egypt) Yahya Elnawasany	9	7	6
9/16	(Egypt) Youssef Ibrahim
[Bye]
7	(Egypt) Karim Gawad
[Bye]
8	(Malaysia) Eain Yow Ng
[Bye]
9/16	(France) Victor Crouin
[Bye]
(Spain) Bernat Jaume	11	8	11	5	14
(Egypt) Karim El Hammamy	5	11	4	11	12
(England) Finlay Withington	3	8	1
(France) Baptiste Masotti	11	11	11
9/16	(Switzerland) Dimitri Steinmann
[Bye]
9/16	(Scotland) Greg Lobban
[Bye]
(England) Simon Herbert	11	11	12
(France) Auguste Dussourd	9	9	10
4	(Wales) Joel Makin
[Bye]

Second round
1	(Egypt) Asal	10	11	3	11	11
(England) Bryant	12	6	11	9	5
(England) Rooney	5	12	6	11	10
(Colombia) Rodríguez	11	10	11	9	12
(England) Todd	7	8	11	11	9
(Egypt) El Torkey	11	11	8	5	11
9/16	(Egypt) Ibrahim	8	11	11	8	11
7	(Egypt) Gawad	11	5	7	11	4
8	(Malaysia) Ng	11	5	7
9/16	(France) Crouin	13	11	11
(Spain) Jaume	6	5	6
(France) Masotti	11	11	11
9/16	(Switzerland) Steinmann	8	11	11	11
9/16	(Scotland) Lobban	11	4	7	5
(England) Herbert	4	4	7
4	(Wales) Makin	11	11	11

Third round
1	(Egypt) Asal	11	11	11
(Colombia) Rodríguez	4	4	4
(Egypt) El Torkey	14	7	5	6
9/16	(Egypt) Ibrahim	12	11	11	11
9/16	(France) Crouin	11	13	11
(France) Masotti	4	11	8
9/16	(Switzerland) Steinmann	5	4	4
4	(Wales) Makin	11	11	11

Quarter-finals
1	(Egypt) Asal	11	11	11
9/16	(Egypt) Ibrahim	7	8	7
Semi-finals
1	(Egypt) Asal	4	13	11	11
4	(Wales) Makin	11	11	8	7
9/16	(France) Crouin	11	5	5	6
4	(Wales) Makin	7	11	11	11

==== Bottom half ====
First round
3	(New Zealand) Paul Coll
Bye
9/16	(Egypt) Fares Dessouky
[Bye]
(United States) Timothy Brownell	9	11	6	4
(India) Abhay Singh	11	4	11	11
(Egypt) Moustafa Elsirty	9	11	11	11
(England) Declan James	11	3	3	9
(South Africa) Dewald van Niekerk	11	6	5	4
(Hong Kong) Alex Lau	9	1	11	11
9/16	(Egypt) Youssef Soliman
[Bye]
(England) George Parker	11	11	11
(Qatar) Abdulla Al-Tamimi	6	3	2
6	(England) Marwan El Shorbagy
[Bye]
5	(England) Mohamed El Shorbagy
[Bye]
(Spain) Iker Pajares	5	11	7	11	11
(England) Nick Wall	11	6	11	7	7
9/16	(Egypt) Mohamed Zakaria
[Bye]
(Switzerland) Nicolas Müller	11	5	11	10	11
(Egypt) Omar Mosaad	5	11	3	12	6
(England) Curtis Malik	11	8	11	11
(Pakistan) Noor Zaman	8	11	2	2
(Colombia) Juan Camilo Vargas	11	12	11
(Hong Kong) Henry Leung	6	10	3
9/16	(France) Grégoire Marche
[Bye]
2	(Peru) Diego Elías
[Bye]

Second round
3	(New Zealand) Coll	11	11	11
9/16	(Egypt) Dessouky	5	8	7
(India) Singh	5	11	5	11	8
(Egypt) Elsirty	11	7	11	7	11
(Hong Kong) Lau	3	6	11	8
9/16	(Egypt) Soliman	11	11	3	11
(England) Parker	6	9	6
6	(England) El Shorbagy	11	11	11
5	(England) El Shorbagy	11	11	11
(Spain) Pajares	3	7	2
9/16	(Egypt) Zakaria	4	11	11	11
9/16	(Switzerland) Müller	11	4	7	6
(England) Malik	10	6	5
(Colombia) Vargas	12	11	11
9/16	(France) Marche	11	4	3	8
2	(Peru) Elías	2	11	11	11

Third round
3	(New Zealand) Coll	11	12	11
(Egypt) Elsirty	4	10	3
9/16	(Egypt) Soliman	9	4	11	6
6	(England) El Shorbagy	11	11	7	11
5	(England) El Shorbagy	11	13	11
(Egypt) Zakaria	5	11	6
(Colombia) Vargas	5	6	4
2	(Peru) Elías	11	11	11

Quarter-finals
3	(New Zealand) Coll	11	11	11
6	(England) El Shorbagy	7	4	2
Semi-finals
3	(New Zealand) Coll	6	9	5
2	(Peru) Elías	11	11	11
5	(England) El Shorbagy	6	6	7
2	(Peru) Elías	11	11	11

== See also ==
- 2025 Women's British Open Squash Championship
