= Squash at the 2019 Pan American Games – Women's doubles =

Squash – Women's doubles at the 2019 Pan American Games
- Venue: CAR Voleibol en la Videna
- Dates: July 26 – July 28
- Competitors: 16 from 8 nations

Medalists
Gold medal	Amanda Sobhy; Sabrina Sobhy	United States
Silver medal	Samantha Cornett; Danielle Letourneau	Canada
Bronze medal	Giselle Delgado; Ana María Pinto	Chile
Bronze medal	Laura Tovar; María Tovar	Colombia

The women's doubles squash event at the 2019 Pan American Games will be held from July 26th – July 28th at the CAR Voleibol en la Videna in Lima, Peru.

Each National Olympic Committee could enter a maximum of one pair into the competition. The athletes will be drawn into an elimination stage draw. Once a pair lost a match, they will be no longer able to compete. Each match will be contested as the best of three games.

== Results ==
=== Bracket ===
Quarterfinals
Amanda Sobhy (USA); Sabrina Sobhy (USA)	11	11
Pilar Etchechoury (ARG); Camila Grasso (ARG)	3	8
Ashley Khalil (GUY); Taylor Fernandes (GUY)	4	11	5
Giselle Delgado (CHI); Ana Pinto (CHI)	11	8	11
Samantha Cornett (CAN); Danielle Letourneau (CAN)	11	11
Ximena Leight (PER); Alejandra Arana (PER)	1	1
Dina Gomez (MEX); Samantha Terán (MEX)	3	9
Laura Tovar (COL); María Tovar (COL)	11	11

Semifinals
Amanda Sobhy (USA); Sabrina Sobhy (USA)	11	11
Giselle Delgado (CHI); Ana Pinto (CHI)	5	3
Samantha Cornett (CAN); Danielle Letourneau (CAN)	10	11	11
Laura Tovar (COL); María Tovar (COL)	11	6	8

Final
Amanda Sobhy (USA); Sabrina Sobhy (USA)	11	11
Samantha Cornett (CAN); Danielle Letourneau (CAN)	10	8
