= Matías Knudsen =

Colombian squash player (born 1999)

Personal information
- Born: 5 October 1999 (age 26) Bogotá, Colombia

Sport
- Country: Colombia
- Handedness: Right handed
- Turned pro: 2022
- Coached by: Martin Knight
- Retired: Active
- Racquet used: Dunlop

Men's singles
- Highest ranking: No. 42 (April 2026)
- Current ranking: No. 42 (April 2026)
- Title: 6
- Tour final: 8
Medal record
Representing Colombia
Men's squash
Event	1st	2nd	3rd
Pan American Championships	3	0	2
CAC Games	2	0	0
South American Games	0	1	0
Junior Pan American Games	1	2	0
Total	6	3	2
Pan American Championships
Gold medal – first place	2024 Lima	Mixed doubles
Gold medal – first place	2024 Lima	Team
Gold medal – first place	2026 Asunción	Doubles
Bronze medal – third place	2025 Rio de Janeiro	Mixed doubles
Bronze medal – third place	2026 Asunción	Team
Central American and Caribbean Games
Gold medal – first place	2026 Santo Domingo	Doubles
Gold medal – first place	2026 Santo Domingo	Team
South American Games
Silver medal – second place	2026 Santa Fe	Singles
Junior Pan American Games
Gold medal – first place	2021 Cali-Valle	Doubles
Silver medal – second place	2021 Cali-Valle	Singles
Silver medal – second place	2021 Cali-Valle	Team

Matías Knudsen (born 5 October 1999) is a Colombian professional squash player. He reached a career high ranking of 42 in the world during April 2026.

== Career ==
Knudsen, who attended Drexel University, where he earned a master's degree in business administration, won the 2023 Colleyville Open. He has also represented Colombia in international competitions. He was named as Philadelphia's 2023 performer of the year.

In 2024, Knudsen won his 4th PSA title after securing victory in the Club Campestre de Medellín during the 2024–25 PSA Squash TourWorld Championship Qualifiers. In April 2025 he won a 5th PSA title after winning the World Championship Qualifiers and added a sixth after winning the República Dominicana Open.
