= Andrés Herrera =

Andrés Herrera may refer to:

- Andrés Herrera (squash player) (born 1996), Colombian squash player
- Andrés Herrera (footballer) (born 1998), Argentine footballer
