= Squash at the 2023 Pan American Games – Women's doubles =

Women's doubles at the 2023 Pan American Games
- Venue: Racket Sports Center
- Dates: November 2 - November 3
- Competitors: 16 from 8 nations

Medalists
Gold medal	Laura Tovar; Lucía Bautista	Colombia
Silver medal	Amanda Sobhy; Olivia Weaver	United States
Bronze medal	Ana María Pinto; Giselle Delgado	Chile
Bronze medal	Meagan Best; Margot Prow	Barbados

The women's doubles competition of the squash events at the 2023 Pan American Games was held from November 2 to November 3 at the Racquet Sports Center (Centro de Entrenamiento del Tenis y Deportes de Raqueta) in Santiago, Chile.

== Format ==
Each National Olympic Committee could enter a maximum of one pair athletes into the competition. The athletes were drawn into an elimination stage draw. Once a pair loses a match, they will be no longer able to compete. Each match will be contested as the best of three games. Unlike other events, there is not bronze medal match, so the two pairs that do not win during the semifinals receive a bronze medal.

== Schedule ==
Date	Time	Round
November 2, 2023	10:30	Quarterfinals
November 2, 2023	17:00	Semifinals
November 3, 2023	18:00	Final

== Results ==
The results were as follows

Quarterfinals
Sahari López (MEX); Diana Gasca (MEX)	9	9
Ana María Pinto (CHI); Giselle Delgado (CHI)	11	11
María Moya (ECU); María Buenaño (ECU)	5	8
Amanda Sobhy (USA); Olivia Weaver (USA)	11	11
Meagan Best (BAR); Margot Prow (BAR)	11	11
Darlyn Sandoval (EAI); Winifer Bonilla (EAI)	5	3
Nikki Todd (CAN); Hollie Naughton (CAN)	11	4	3
Laura Tovar (COL); Lucía Bautista (COL)	7	11	11

Semifinals
Ana María Pinto (CHI); Giselle Delgado (CHI)	3	4
Amanda Sobhy (USA); Olivia Weaver (USA)	11	11
Meagan Best (BAR); Margot Prow (BAR)	5	5
Laura Tovar (COL); Lucía Bautista (COL)	11	11

Final
Amanda Sobhy (USA); Olivia Weaver (USA)	9	11	9
Laura Tovar (COL); Lucía Bautista (COL)	11	3	11
