= Squash at the 2022 Bolivarian Games =

Squash competitions at the 2022 Bolivarian Games

- Squash pictogram
- Venue: Unidad Deportiva El Salitre
- Dates: 25–29 June 2022
- Competitors: 49 from 8 nations

Champions
- Colombia (6 gold medals)

Squash competitions at the 2022 Bolivarian Games in Valledupar, Colombia were held from 25 to 29 June 2022 at Unidad Deportiva El Salitre in Bogotá, a sub-venue outside Valledupar.

Seven medal events were scheduled to be contested; singles, doubles and team events for men and women plus a mixed doubles event. A total of 45 athletes (23 men and 22 women) competed in the events. The events were open competitions without age restrictions.

Colombia, who were the competition defending champions after Santa Marta 2017, won the squash competitions again after winning 6 of the 7 gold medals at stake

== Participating nations ==
A total of 8 nations (6 ODEBO nations and 2 invited) registered athletes for the squash competitions. Each nation was able to enter a maximum of 8 athletes (4 per gender). Each nation could register up to two athletes for each men and women singles events; one pair for each men, women and mixed doubles events and one team conformed by four athletes for both men and women team events

- Bolivia (4 athletes)
- Chile (4)
- Colombia (8)
- Ecuador (8)
- Guatemala (8)
- Paraguay (2)
- Peru (7)
- Venezuela (4)

== Venue ==
The squash competitions were held at squash courts of the Unidad Deportiva El Salitre, in Bogotá. Squash events were originally scheduled to be held at Club El Nogal also in Bogotá.

== Medal summary ==
=== Medal table ===
* Host nation (Host nation)

| Rank | Nation | Gold | Silver | Bronze | Total |
|---|---|---|---|---|---|
| 1 | Colombia* | 6 | 2 | 1 | 9 |
| 2 | Ecuador | 1 | 0 | 4 | 5 |
| 3 | Chile | 0 | 2 | 1 | 3 |
| 3 | Peru | 0 | 2 | 1 | 3 |
| 5 | Paraguay | 0 | 1 | 1 | 2 |
| 6 | Guatemala | 0 | 0 | 6 | 6 |
| Totals (6 entries) | | 7 | 7 | 14 | 28 |

Source: Bolivarianos Valledupar 2022 – Squash medals

=== Medalists ===
| Event | Gold | Silver | Bronze |
|---|---|---|---|
| Men's singles | Miguel Ángel Rodríguez; Colombia | Juan Camilo Vargas; Colombia | Edwin Enríquez; Guatemala |
| Men's singles | Miguel Ángel Rodríguez; Colombia | Juan Camilo Vargas; Colombia | Junior Enríquez; Guatemala |
| Women's singles | María Moya; Ecuador | Lucía Bautista; Colombia | Laura Tovar; Colombia |
| Women's singles | María Moya; Ecuador | Lucía Bautista; Colombia | Luján Palacios; Paraguay |
| Men's doubles | Colombia (COL); Andrés Herrera; Juan Camilo Vargas | Peru (PER); Diego Elías; Alonso Escudero | Guatemala (GUA); Junior Enríquez; Edwin Enríquez |
| Men's doubles | Colombia (COL); Andrés Herrera; Juan Camilo Vargas | Peru (PER); Diego Elías; Alonso Escudero | Ecuador (ECU); Álvaro Buenaño; David Costales |
| Women's doubles | Colombia (COL); Andrea Soria; Lucía Bautista | Chile (CHI); Ana María Pinto; Giselle Delgado | Guatemala (GUA); Tabita Gaitán; Winifer Bonilla |
| Women's doubles | Colombia (COL); Andrea Soria; Lucía Bautista | Chile (CHI); Ana María Pinto; Giselle Delgado | Ecuador (ECU); María Buenaño; María Moya |
| Mixed doubles | Colombia (COL); Miguel Ángel Rodríguez; Laura Tovar | Paraguay (PAR); Francesco Marcantonio; Luján Palacios | Guatemala (GUA); José Toscano; Darlyn Sandoval |
| Mixed doubles | Colombia (COL); Miguel Ángel Rodríguez; Laura Tovar | Paraguay (PAR); Francesco Marcantonio; Luján Palacios | Ecuador (ECU); Javier Romo; Rafaela Albuja |
| Men's team | Colombia (COL); Andrés Herrera; Ronald Palomino; Miguel Ángel Rodríguez; Juan Camilo Vargas | Peru (PER); Diego Elías; Alonso Escudero; Rafael Gálvez; Álvaro García | Guatemala (GUA); Edwin Enríquez; Junior Enríquez; José Toscano |
| Men's team | Colombia (COL); Andrés Herrera; Ronald Palomino; Miguel Ángel Rodríguez; Juan Camilo Vargas | Peru (PER); Diego Elías; Alonso Escudero; Rafael Gálvez; Álvaro García | Chile (CHI); José Gallegos; Jaime Pinto |
| Women's team | Colombia (COL); Lucía Bautista; Andrea Soria; Laura Tovar; María Tovar | Chile (CHI); Ana María Pinto; Giselle Delgado | Ecuador (ECU); Rafaela Albuja; María Buenaño; María Falconí; María Moya |
| Women's team | Colombia (COL); Lucía Bautista; Andrea Soria; Laura Tovar; María Tovar | Chile (CHI); Ana María Pinto; Giselle Delgado | Peru (PER); Luciana Castillo; Ximena Rodríguez; Alejandra Zavala |
