= Independent Athletes Team at the 2023 Pan American Games =

- IOC code: EAI
- NOC: N/A

in Santiago, Chile 20 October 2023 – 5 November 2023
- Competitors: 82 in 17 sports
- Flag bearers (opening): Emilio Flores & Lucero Mejia
- Flag bearers (closing): Diego Aguilar & Dalia Soberanes
- Medals Ranked 14th: Gold 3 Silver 4 Bronze 12 Total 19

Pan American Games appearances (overview)
- 2023; 2027

Other related appearances
- Guatemala (1951–pres.)

The PanAm Sports Independent Athletes competed at the 2023 Pan American Games in Santiago, Chile from 20 October to 5 November 2023. The team was made up of athletes from Guatemala, whose NOC was suspended by International Olympic Committee during the games and was therefore not allowed to compete under its flag.

Sport climber Emilio Flores and swimmer Lucero Mejia were the teams flagbearers during the opening ceremony. Meanwhile, bowler Diego Aguilar and roller speed skater Dalia Soberanes were the delegation's flagbearers during the closing ceremony.

== Competitors ==
The following is the list of number of competitors (per gender) that participated at the games per sport/discipline.

Sport	Men	Women	Total
Archery	5	1	6
Badminton	3	4	7
Basque pelota	0	1	1
Bowling	0	2	2
Boxing	3	2	5
Canoeing	0	1	1
Cycling	2	3	5
Equestrian			7
Golf	2	1	3
Gymnastics	1	0	1
Karate	3	2	5
Modern pentathlon	2	3	5
Racquetball	2	2	4
Roller sports	0	2	2
Rowing	1	2	3
Sailing	2	2	4
Shooting	6	11	17
Sport climbing	1	0	1
Squash	3	3	6
Table tennis	3	3	6
Taekwondo	3	1	4
Triathlon	2	2	4
Weightlifting	3	3	6
Wrestling	2	0	2
Total	49	51	100

== Medallists ==
The following PanAm Sports Independent Athletes won medals at the games. In the discipline sections below, the medalists' names are bolded.

Medal	Name	Sport	Event	Date
Gold	Gabriela Martinez; Maria Renee Rodriguez	Racquetball	Women's Doubles	24 October
Gold	Jean Pierre Brol	Trap shooting	Men's trap	27 October
Gold	Adriana Ruano	Trap shooting	Women's trap	26 October
Silver	Kevin Cordón	Badminton	Men's singles	25 October
Silver	Sophia Hernández; Paula Valencia	Modern pentathlon	Women's relay	26 October
Silver	Maria Higueros	Taekwondo	Women's individual poomsae	21 October
Silver	Waleska Soto	Trap shooting	Women's trap	26 October
Bronze	Hebert Brol	Trap shooting	Men's trap	27 October
Bronze	Alberto González	Athletics	Men's 10,000 metres	3 November
Bronze	Sophia Hernandez	Modern pentathlon	Women's individual	23 October
Bronze	Juan Ignacio Maegli	Sailing	ILCA 7 Class	4 November
Bronze	Aníbal Marroquín; Jonathan Solís	Badminton	Men's doubles	24 October
Bronze	Allan Maldonado	Karate	Men's 75 kg	5 November
Bronze	Bárbara Morales	Karate	Women's 50 kg	3 November
Bronze	María Renée Wong	Karate	Women's 61 kg	4 November
Bronze	Edwin Galicia; Juan José Salvatierra	Racquetball	Men's doubles	24 October
Bronze	Gabriela Martinez; Maria Renee Rodriguez	Racquetball	Women's Team	26 October
Bronze	Josué Enríquez; Alejandro Enríquez	Squash	Men's doubles	2 November
Bronze	Tabita Gaitán; Luis Quinquinay	Squash	Mixed doubles	2 November

Medals by sport/discipline
Sport	1st place, gold medalist(s)	2nd place, silver medalist(s)	3rd place, bronze medalist(s)	Total
Trap shooting	2	1	1	**4**
Racquetball	1	0	2	**3**
Karate	0	0	3	**3**
Badminton	0	1	1	**2**
Modern Pentathlon	0	1	1	**2**
Squash	0	0	2	**2**
Taekwondo	0	1	0	**1**
Athletics	0	0	1	**1**
Sailing	0	0	1	**1**
Total	3	4	12	19

Medals by day
**Day**	1st place, gold medalist(s)	2nd place, silver medalist(s)	3rd place, bronze medalist(s)	**Total**
21 October	0	1	0	1
23 October	0	0	1	1
24 October	1	0	2	3
25 October	0	1	0	1
26 October	1	2	1	4
27 October	1	0	1	2
2 November	0	0	2	2
3 November	0	0	2	2
4 November	0	0	2	2
5 November	0	0	1	1
Total	3	4	12	19

Medals by gender
**Gender**	1st place, gold medalist(s)	2nd place, silver medalist(s)	3rd place, bronze medalist(s)	**Total**
Women	2	3	4	9
Men	1	1	7	9
Mixed/Open	0	0	1	1
Total	3	4	12	19

== Archery ==
Independent Athletes Team qualified two archers during the 2022 Pan American Archery Championships. Independent Athletes Team also qualified four archers (three men and one woman) during the 2023 Copa Merengue.

Men

Athlete	Event	Ranking Round		Round of 32	Round of 16	Quarterfinals	Semifinals	Final / BM	Rank
Athlete	Event	Score	Seed	Opposition Score	Opposition Score	Opposition Score	Opposition Score	Opposition Score	Rank
	Individual recurve								
	Team recurve			—N/a					
	Individual compound								
	Team compound			—N/a					

Women

Athlete	Event	Ranking Round		Round of 32	Round of 16	Quarterfinals	Semifinals	Final / BM	Rank
Athlete	Event	Score	Seed	Opposition Score	Opposition Score	Opposition Score	Opposition Score	Opposition Score	Rank
	Individual compound								

Mixed

Athlete	Event	Ranking Round		Round of 32	Round of 16	Quarterfinals	Semifinals	Final / BM	Rank
Athlete	Event	Score	Seed	Opposition Score	Opposition Score	Opposition Score	Opposition Score	Opposition Score	Rank
	Team compound			—N/a					

== Badminton ==
Independent Athletes Team qualified a team of seven athletes (three men and four women).

Men

Athlete	Event	First round	Second round	Quarterfinals	Semifinals	Final / BM	
Athlete	Event	Opposition Result	Opposition Result	Opposition Result	Opposition Result	Opposition Result	Rank
Kevin Cordón	Singles	Ma (USA); W 2–0 (21-13, 21-12)	Linarez (DOM); W 2–0 (21-11, 21-11)	Viale (PER); W 2–0 (21-15, 21-9)	Garrido (MEX); W 2–0 (21-17, 21-12)	Yang (CAN); L 0–2 (18-21, 6-21)	2nd place, silver medalist(s)
Aníbal Marroquín; Jonathan Solís	Doubles	Sanhueza (CHI); Vásquez (CHI); W 2–0 (21-7, 21-5)	Lee (CAN); Lindeman (CAN); W 2–1 (15-21, 21-10, 21-18)	Farias (BRA); Silva (BRA); L 0–2 (18-21, 16-21)	Did not advance		

Women

Athlete	Event	First round	Second round	Third round	Quarterfinals	Semifinals	Final / BM	
Athlete	Event	Opposition Result	Opposition Result	Opposition Result	Opposition Result	Opposition Result	Opposition Result	Rank
Mariana Palacios	Singles	Bye	Rivva (PER); L 0–2 (10-21, 9-21)	Did not advance				
Adriana Barrios	Singles	Bye	Gai (USA); L 0–2 (9-21, 11-21)	Did not advance				
Nikté Sotomayor	Singles	Bye	Acosta (DOM); W 2–0 (21-9, 21-8)	Boulet (TRI); W 2–0 (21-9, 21-18)	Zhang (USA); L 0–2 (8-21, 6-21)	Did not advance		
Adriana Barrios; Mariana Palacios	Doubles	Choi (CAN); Wu (CAN); L 0–2 (3-21, 3-21)	Did not advance					
Diana Corleto; Nikté Sotomayor	Doubles	Oropesa (CUB); Ortiz (CUB); W 2–0 (21-17, 21-19)	A Xu (USA); K Xu (USA); L 0–2 (8-21, 6-21)	Did not advance				

Mixed

Athlete	Event	First round	Second round	Quarterfinals	Semifinals	Final / BM	
Athlete	Event	Opposition Result	Opposition Result	Opposition Result	Opposition Result	Opposition Result	Rank
Jonathan Solís; Diana Corleto	Doubles	Otero (ARG); Gualdi (ARG); W 2–0 (21-8, 21-13)	Lima (BRA); Silva (BRA); L 1–2 (12-21, 24-22, 21-14)	Did not advance			

== Basque pelota ==
Independent Athletes Team qualified a female pelotari through the 2023 Pan American Basque Pelota Tournament.

Women

Athlete	Event	Preliminary round					Semifinal	Final / BM	Rank
Athlete	Event	Match 1	Match 2	Match 3	Match 4	Rank	Semifinal	Final / BM	Rank
Athlete	Event	Opposition Score	Opposition Score	Opposition Score	Opposition Score	Rank	Opposition Score	Opposition Score	Rank
Joana Blas	Frontball								

== Bowling ==
Independent Athletes Team qualified a team of two women.

Athlete	Event	Qualification / Final																Round robin											Semifinal	Final / BM	
Athlete	Event	Block 1							Block 2							Total	Rank	Round robin											Semifinal	Final / BM	
Athlete	Event	1	2	3	4	5	6	Total	7	8	9	10	11	12	Total	Total	Rank	1	2	3	4	5	6	7	8	Total	Grand total	Rank	Opposition Result	Opposition Result	Rank
	Women's singles																														
	Women's doubles																	—N/a													

== Boxing ==
Independent Athletes Team qualified 5 boxers (three men and two women).

Athlete	Event	Round of 32	Round of 16	Quarterfinal	Semifinal	Final	
Athlete	Event	Opposition Result	Opposition Result	Opposition Result	Opposition Result	Opposition Result	Rank
Hansell López	Men's –51 kg	—N/a	Trindade (BRA)				
Juan Reyes	Men's –57 kg	—N/a	Fernández (URU); L 0–5	Did not advance			
Wyatt Trujillo	Men's –80 kg	—N/a	Pereira (BRA)				
Aylin Jamez	Women's –50 kg	—N/a	Wright (CAN)				
Leilany Reyes	Women's –57 kg	—N/a	Alcalá (VEN)				

== Canoeing ==
=== Sprint ===
Independent Athletes Team qualified a female sprint canoeist.

Women

Athlete	Event	Heat		Semifinal		Final	
Athlete	Event	Time	Rank	Time	Rank	Time	Rank
Nataly Ramírez	K-1 500 m						

== Cycling ==
Independent Athletes Team qualified a total of 5 cyclists (2 men and 3 women).

=== BMX ===
Racing

Athlete	Event	Ranking round		Quarterfinal		Semifinal		Final	
Athlete	Event	Time	Rank	Points	Rank	Time	Rank	Time	Rank
Andrea González	Women's								

=== Mountain biking ===
Independent Athletes Team qualified 1 female athlete at the 2023 Pan American Championships.

Athlete	Event	Time	Rank
Florinda de León	Women's Cross-country		

=== Road ===
Independent Athletes Team qualified 1 cyclist at the Central American Championships. Independent Athletes Team also qualified 1 cyclist at the Pan American Championships.

Athlete	Event	Time	Rank
Alex Julajuj	Men's road race		
Dorian Monterroso	Men's road race		
Jasmín Soto	Women's road race		

== Equestrian ==
Independent Athletes Team qualified a full team of 4 equestrians in Eventing, two individual equestrians in Show Jumping and one individual equestrian in Dressage.

=== Dressage ===
Athlete	Horse	Event	Qualification						Grand Prix Freestyle / Intermediate I Freestyle	
Athlete	Horse	Event	Grand Prix / Prix St. Georges		Grand Prix Special / Intermediate I		Total		Grand Prix Freestyle / Intermediate I Freestyle	
Athlete	Horse	Event	Score	Rank	Score	Rank	Score	Rank	Score	Rank
		Individual								

=== Eventing ===
Athlete	Horse	Event	Dressage		Cross-country		Jumping		Total	
Athlete	Horse	Event	Points	Rank	Points	Rank	Points	Rank	Points	Rank
		Individual								
		Team								

=== Jumping ===
Athlete	Horse	Event	Qualification								Final					
Athlete	Horse	Event	Round 1		Round 2		Round 3		Total		Round A		Round B		Total	
Athlete	Horse	Event	Faults	Rank	Faults	Rank	Faults	Rank	Faults	Rank	Faults	Rank	Faults	Rank	Faults	Rank
		Individual														

== Golf ==
Independent Athletes Team qualified a team of 3 golfers (two men and one woman).

Athlete	Event	Round 1	Round 2	Round 3	Round 4	Total		
Athlete	Event	Score	Score	Score	Score	Score	Par	Rank
José Manuel Toledo	Men's individual	70	67	67	69	273	—15	T6
José Pablo Rolz	Men's individual	70	69	67	71	277	—11	8
Valeria Mendizabal	Women's individual	76	78	72	71	297	+9	T15

== Gymnastics ==
=== Artistic ===
Independent Athletes Team qualified one male gymnast in artistic at the 2023 Pan American Championships.

Men

Athlete	Event	Qualification						Total	Rank
Athlete	Event	F	PH	R	V	PB	HB	Total	Rank
	Individual all-around								

Qualification Legend: Q = Qualified to apparatus final

== Karate ==
Independent Athletes Team qualified a team of five karatekas (three men and two women) at the 2023 Central American and Caribbean Championship and the 2023 Pan American Championships.

Kumite

Athlete	Event	Round robin				Semifinal	Final	
Athlete	Event	Opposition Result	Opposition Result	Opposition Result	Rank	Opposition Result	Opposition Result	Rank
Pedro de la Roca	Men's −60 kg							
Allan Maldonado	Men's −75 kg							
Brandon Ramírez	Men's −84 kg							
Barbara Morales	Women's −50 kg							
María Renée Wong	Women's −61 kg							

== Modern pentathlon ==
Independent Athletes Team qualified five modern pentathletes (two men and three women).

Athlete	Event	Fencing (Épée one touch)				Swimming (200 m freestyle)			Riding (Show jumping)			Shooting / Running (10 m laser pistol / 3000 m cross-country)			Total	
Athlete	Event	V – D	Rank	MP points	BP	Time	Rank	MP points	Penalties	Rank	MP points	Time	Rank	MP points	MP points	Rank
Andrés Fernández	Men's individual															
José Miguel Molina	Men's individual															
Juan Ochoa	Men's individual															
José Miguel Molina; Juan Ochoa	Men's relay															
Ana Sophia Hernández	Women's individual															
Paula Sophia Valencia	Women's individual															
Sofía Cabrera	Women's individual															
Paula Sophia Valencia; Sofía Cabrera	Women's relay															
Andrés Fernández; Ana Sophia Hernández	Mixed relay															

== Racquetball ==
Independent Athletes Team qualified four racquetball athletes (two men and two women).

Men

Athlete	Event	Round of 32	Round of 16	Quarterfinal	Semifinal	Final	
Athlete	Event	Opposition Result	Opposition Result	Opposition Result	Opposition Result	Opposition Result	Rank
Edwin Galicia	Singles	Espinosa (CUB); W 3–0 (11–4, 11–3, 11–6)	Keller (BOL); L 0–3 (9–11, 5–11, 8–11)	Did not advance			
Juan Jose Salvatierra	Singles	Moyet (CUB); L 1–3 (11–4, 13–15, 9–11, 5–11)	Did not advance				
Edwin Galicia; Juan Jose Salvatierra	Doubles	—N/a	Salgado / Gatica (CHI); W 3–1 (11–9, 6–11, 11–6, 11–9)	Carrasco / Moscoso (BOL); W 3–1 (12–10, 8–11, 11–6, 11–5)	Iwaasa / Murray (CAN); L 2–3 (9–11, 11–8, 7–11, 11–8, 7–11)	Did not advance	3rd place, bronze medalist(s)
Edwin Galicia; Juan Jose Salvatierra	Team	—N/a	Bye	Mexico; L 2–0 (0–3, 0–3)	Did not advance		

Women

Athlete	Event	Round of 32	Round of 16	Quarterfinal	Semifinal	Final	
Athlete	Event	Opposition Result	Opposition Result	Opposition Result	Opposition Result	Opposition Result	Rank
Gabriela Martinez	Singles	Bye	Gomez (CRC); W 3–0 (11–5, 11–2, 11–4)	Vargas (ARG); L 0–3 (11–13, 11–13, 10–12)	Did not advance		
Maria Renee Rodriguez	Singles	Bye	Ortiz (CRC); L 0–3 (7–11, 9–11, 17–19)	Did not advance			
Gabriela Martinez; Maria Renee Rodriguez	Doubles	—N/a	Bye	C. Muñoz / Mansilla (CHI); W 3–0 (11–6, 11–5, 11–8)	Barrios / Daza (BOL); W 3–1 (11–13, 11–9, 12–10, 12–10)	Mendez / Vargas (ARG); W 3–1 (11–2, 8–11, 14–12, 11–6)	1st place, gold medalist(s)
Gabriela Martinez; Maria Renee Rodriguez	Team	—N/a	Bye	Costa Rica; W 2–1 (0–3, 3–0, 3–0)	Argentina; L 0–2 (0–3, 0–3)	Did not advance	3rd place, bronze medalist(s)

Mixed

Athlete	Event	Round of 16	Quarterfinal	Semifinal	Final	
Athlete	Event	Opposition Result	Opposition Result	Opposition Result	Opposition Result	Rank
Gabriela Martinez; Edwin Galicia	Doubles	Bye	Manilla / Manilla (USA); L 2–3 (9–11, 13–11, 6–11, 11–8, 9–11)	Did not advance		

== Roller sports ==
=== Speed ===
Athlete	Event	Preliminary		Semifinal		Final	
Athlete	Event	Time	Rank	Time	Rank	Time	Rank
Dalia Soberanis	Women's 200 m time trial						
Dalia Soberanis	Women's 500 m						
Dalia Soberanis	Women's 1000 m sprint						
Angelica Díaz	Women's 10,000 m elimination	—N/a					

== Rowing ==
Independent Athletes Team qualified a team of 3 athletes (one man and two women).

Men

Athlete	Event	Heat		Repechage		Semifinal		Final A/B	
Athlete	Event	Time	Rank	Time	Rank	Time	Rank	Time	Rank
	Men's single sculls								
	Women's lightweight Double sculls					—N/a			

== Sailing ==
Independent Athletes Team qualified 4 boats for a total of 4 sailors.

Men

Athlete	Event	Race													Total	
Athlete	Event	1	2	3	4	5	6	7	8	9	10	11	12	M	Points	Rank
	Laser											—N/a				
	Sunfish											—N/a				

Women

Athlete	Event	Race													Total	
Athlete	Event	1	2	3	4	5	6	7	8	9	10	11	12	M	Points	Rank
	Laser Radial											—N/a				
	Sunfish											—N/a				

== Shooting ==
Independent Athletes Team qualified a total of 17 shooters after the 2022 Americas Shooting Championships.

Men

Pistol and rifle

Athlete	Event	Qualification		Final	
Athlete	Event	Points	Rank	Points	Rank
	10 m air pistol				
	10 m air rifle				

Men

Shotgun

Athlete	Event	Qualification		Semifinal		Final / BM	
Athlete	Event	Points	Rank	Points	Rank	Opposition Result	Rank
	Trap						
	Skeet						

Women

Pistol and rifle

Athlete	Event	Qualification		Final	
Athlete	Event	Points	Rank	Points	Rank
	10 m air pistol				
	25 m pistol				
	10 m air rifle				
	50 metre rifle three positions				

Women

Shotgun

Athlete	Event	Qualification		Semifinal		Final / BM	
Athlete	Event	Points	Rank	Points	Rank	Opposition Result	Rank
	Trap						
	Skeet						

== Sport climbing ==
Independent Athletes Team qualified a male climber by virtue of his IFSC world rankings.

Speed

Athlete	Event	Round of 16	Quarterfinal	Semifinal	Final / BM	
Athlete	Event	Opposition Result	Opposition Result	Opposition Result	Opposition Result	Rank
Emilio Flores	Men's					

== Squash ==
Independent Athletes Team qualified a full team of six athletes (three men and three women) through the 2023 Pan American Squash Championships.

Men

Athlete	Event	Round of 16	Quarterfinal	Semifinal	Final / BM	
Athlete	Event	Opposition Result	Opposition Result	Opposition Result	Opposition Result	Rank
Alejandro Enríquez	Singles					
Josué Enríquez	Singles					
Alejandro Enríquez; Josué Enríquez	Doubles	—N/a				
Alejandro Enríquez; Ángel Quisquinay; Josué Enríquez	Team	—N/a				

Women

Athlete	Event	Round of 16	Quarterfinal	Semifinal	Final / BM	
Athlete	Event	Opposition Result	Opposition Result	Opposition Result	Opposition Result	Rank
Tabita Gaitán	Singles					
Winifer Bonilla	Singles					
Darlyn Sandoval; Winifer Bonilla	Doubles	—N/a				
Darlyn Sandoval; Tabita Gaitán; Winifer Bonilla	Team	—N/a				

Mixed

Athlete	Event	Quarterfinal	Semifinal	Final / BM	
Athlete	Event	Opposition Result	Opposition Result	Opposition Result	Rank
Edwin Enríquez; Tabita Gaitán	Doubles				

== Table tennis ==
Independent Athletes Team qualified a full team of six athletes (three men and three women) through the 2023 Central American Championships.

Men

Athlete	Event	Group stage				First round	Second round	Quarterfinal	Semifinal	Final / BM	
Athlete	Event	Opposition Result	Opposition Result	Opposition Result	Rank	Opposition Result	Opposition Result	Opposition Result	Opposition Result	Opposition Result	Rank
Heber Moscoso	Singles	—N/a									
Héctor Gatica	Singles	—N/a									
Héctor Gatica; Heber Moscoso	Doubles	—N/a									
Sergio Carrillo; Héctor Gatica; Heber Moscoso	Team	—N/a				—N/a					

Women

Athlete	Event	Group stage				First round	Second round	Quarterfinal	Semifinal	Final / BM	
Athlete	Event	Opposition Result	Opposition Result	Opposition Result	Rank	Opposition Result	Opposition Result	Opposition Result	Opposition Result	Opposition Result	Rank
Lucía Cordero	Singles	—N/a									
Mabelyn Enríquez	Singles	—N/a									
Lucía Cordero; Mabelyn Enríquez	Doubles	—N/a									
Lucía Cordero; Mabelyn Enríquez; Hidalynn Zapata	Team	—N/a				—N/a					

Mixed

Athlete	Event	First Round	Quarterfinal	Semifinal	Final / BM	
Athlete	Event	Opposition Result	Opposition Result	Opposition Result	Opposition Result	Rank
Héctor Gatica; Mabelyn Enríquez	Doubles					

== Taekwondo ==
Independent Athletes Team qualified 4 athletes (three men and one woman) during the Pan American Games Qualification Tournament.

Kyorugi

Men

Athlete	Event	Round of 16	Quarterfinals	Semifinals	Repechage	Final/ BM	
Athlete	Event	Opposition Result	Opposition Result	Opposition Result	Opposition Result	Opposition Result	Rank
David Fuentes	–58 kg	Yohandri Granado (VEN); L 0-2	Did not advance				
Diego Montufar	–68 kg	Federico González (URU); L 1-2	Did not advance				

Poomsae (forms)

Athlete	Event	Round of 16	Quarterfinal	Semifinal	Final	
Athlete	Event	Opposition Result	Opposition Result	Opposition Result	Opposition Result	Rank
Hector Morales	Men's individual	Troya (ECU) L 7.110–7.160	Did not advance			
Maria Higueros	Women's individual	Bye	Darce (NCA) W 7.540–7.120	Medina (PUR) W 7.590–7.390	Reclusado (USA) L 7.350–7.830	2nd place, silver medalist(s)
	Mixed pair					

== Triathlon ==
Independent Athletes Team qualified a triathlon team of four athletes (two men and two women).

Athlete	Event	Swim (1.5 km)	Trans 1	Bike (40 km)	Trans 2	Run (10 km)	Total	Rank
Jorge Raúl Cabinal	Men's individual							
Pablo Granados	Men's individual							
Bivian Díaz	Women's individual							
Marlen Aguilar	Women's individual							

Mixed relay

Athlete	Event	Swimming (300 m)	Transition 1	Biking (6.6 km)	Transition2	Running (1.5 km)	Total	Rank
Bivian Díaz	Mixed relay							—N/a
Jorge Raúl Cabinal	Mixed relay							—N/a
Pablo Granados	Mixed relay							—N/a
Marlen Aguilar	Mixed relay							—N/a
Total	Mixed relay	—N/a						

== Volleyball ==
=== Beach ===
Athlete	Event	Group stage				Round of 16	Quarterfinal	Semifinal / Cl.	Final / BM / Pl.	
Athlete	Event	Opposition Result	Opposition Result	Opposition Result	Rank	Opposition Result	Opposition Result	Opposition Result	Opposition Result	Rank
Luis Augusto Garica Betancourt; Andy Alexis Leonardo Blanco	Men's									
Corinne Quiggle; Sarah Schermerhorn	Women's									

== Weightlifting ==
Independent Athletes Team qualified six weightlifters (three men and three women).

Athlete	Event	Snatch		Clean & Jerk		Total	Rank
Athlete	Event	Result	Rank	Result	Rank	Total	Rank

== Wrestling ==
Independent Athletes Team qualified two male wrestlers through the 2022 Pan American Wrestling Championships and the 2023 Pan American Wrestling Championships.

Key:

- VT – Victory by fall.
- PP – Decision by points – the loser with technical points.
- PO – Decision by points – the loser without technical points.
- SP – Technical superiority – the loser with technical points and a margin of victory of at least 9 (Greco-Roman) or 10 (freestyle) points.
- ST – Great superiority – the loser without technical points and a margin of victory of at least 8 (Greco-Roman) or 10 (freestyle) points.
- VA – Decision by withdrawal

Men

Athlete	Event	Quarterfinal	Semifinal	Final / BM	
Athlete	Event	Opposition Result	Opposition Result	Opposition Result	Rank
	Freestyle 57 kg				
	Greco-Roman 77 kg				

== See also ==
- Guatemala at the 2023 Parapan American Games
- Guatemala at the 2024 Summer Olympics
