= Pan American Squash Championships =

Pan American Championships

Details
- Event name: Pan American Squash Championships

Men's Winner
- Most recent champion(s): (Colombia) Ronald Palomino

Women's Winner
- Most recent champion(s): (Canada) Hollie Naughton

The Pan American Squash Championships are the event which serves as the individual Pan American championship for squash players organised by the Federation of Panamerica. The Pan American Championships was first held in 2002.

== Past results ==
=== Men's championship ===
Year	Champions	Runners-up	Location
2025	(Colombia) Ronald Palomino	(Mexico) Leonel Cárdenas	(Brazil) Rio de Janeiro
2024	(Peru) Diego Elías	(Colombia) Ronald Palomino	(Peru) Lima
2023	(Peru) Diego Elías	(Colombia) Juan Camilo Vargas	(Colombia) Cartagena
2022	(Argentina) Leandro Romiglio	(Colombia) Juan Camilo Vargas	Guatemala City
2020	Cancelled due to COVID-19 pandemic in South America		(Bolivia) Cochabamba
2019	Did not held due to the 2019 Pan American Games		
2018	(Peru) Diego Elías	(Jamaica) Christopher Binnie	(Cayman Islands) George Town
2017	(Argentina) Robertino Pezzota	(Argentina) Gonzalo Miranda	(Argentina) Buenos Aires
2016	(Argentina) Leandro Romiglio	(Mexico) Arturo Salazar	(United States) Hartford
2015	Did not held due to the 2015 Pan American Games		
2014	(Colombia) Miguel Ángel Rodríguez	(Mexico) Alfredo Ávila	(Mexico) Toluca
2013	(Colombia) Miguel Ángel Rodríguez	(Mexico) César Salazar	(Argentina) Buenos Aires
2012	(Colombia) Miguel Ángel Rodríguez	(Argentina) Hernán D'Arcangelo	(Ecuador) Ambato
2011	Did not held due to the 2011 Pan American Games		
2010	(Mexico) Jorge Baltazar	(Brazil) Rafael Alarçón	Guatemala City
2009	(Mexico) Eric Gálvez	(Mexico) Jorge Baltazar	(Ecuador) Ambato
2008	(United States) Julian Illingworth	(United States) Christopher Gordon	(Ecuador) Cuenca
2007	Did not held due to the 2007 Pan American Games		
2006	(Canada) Jonathon Power	(Mexico) Eric Gálvez	(Colombia) Medellín
2005	(Mexico) Eric Gálvez	(Mexico) José Ángel Becerril	(El Salvador) San Salvador
2004	(Argentina) Jorge Gutiérrez	(Mexico) Eric Gálvez	(Mexico) Tepic
2003	Did not held due to the 2003 Pan American Games		
2002	(Argentina) Jorge Gutiérrez	(Mexico) Eric Gálvez	(Ecuador) Quito

=== Women's championship ===
Year	Champions	Runners-up	Location
2025	(Canada) Hollie Naughton	(Canada) Nicole Bunyan	(Brazil) Rio de Janeiro
2024	(Canada) Nicole Bunyan	(Canada) Danielle Ray	(Peru) Lima
2023	(Canada) Hollie Naughton	(United States) Marina Stefanoni	(Colombia) Cartagena
2022	(Guyana) Nicolette Fernandes	(Colombia) Laura Tovar	Guatemala City
2020	Cancelled due to COVID-19 pandemic in South America		(Bolivia) Cochabamba
2019	Did not held due to the 2019 Pan American Games		
2018	(United States) Amanda Sobhy	(United States) Sabrina Sobhy	(Cayman Islands) George Town
2017	(Mexico) Samantha Terán	(Mexico) Diana García	(Argentina) Buenos Aires
2016	(United States) Mariam Kamal	(United States) Haley Mendez	(United States) Hartford
2015	Did not held due to the 2015 Pan American Games		
2014	(Mexico) Samantha Terán	(Canada) Samantha Cornett	(Mexico) Toluca
2013	(United States) Amanda Sobhy	(United States) Natalie Grainger	(Argentina) Buenos Aires
2012	(Mexico) Diana Garcia	(Brazil) Thaisa Serafini	(Ecuador) Ambato
2011	Did not held due to the 2011 Pan American Games		
2010	(Mexico) Samantha Terán	(United States) Natalie Grainger	Guatemala City
2009	(Mexico) Samantha Terán	(Canada) Tara Mullins	(Ecuador) Ambato
2008	(Colombia) Silvia Angulo	(United States) Kristen Lange	(Ecuador) Cuenca
2007	Did not held due to the 2007 Pan American Games		
2006	(Mexico) Samantha Terán	(Guyana) Nicolette Fernandes	(Colombia) Medellín
2005	(Canada) Alana Miller	(Mexico) Samantha Terán	(El Salvador) San Salvador
2004	(Mexico) Samantha Terán	(United States) Meredeth Quick	(Mexico) Tepic
2003	Did not held due to the 2003 Pan American Games		
2002	(Mexico) Samantha Terán	(Canada) Marnie Baizley	(Ecuador) Quito

=== Statistics ===
==== Men ====
3	(Colombia) Miguel Ángel Rodríguez

3	(Peru) Diego Elías

2	(Mexico) Eric Gálvez

2	(Argentina) Jorge Gutiérrez

2	(Argentina) Leandro Romiglio

1	(Argentina) Robertino Pezzota

1	(Canada) Jonathon Power

1	(Colombia) Ronald Palomino

1	(Mexico) Jorge Baltazar

1	(United States) Julian Illingworth

==== Women ====
7	(Mexico) Samantha Terán

2	(Canada) Hollie Naughton

2	(United States) Amanda Sobhy

1	(Guyana) Nicolette Fernandes

1	(Canada) Alana Miller

1	(Canada) Nicole Bunyan

1	(United States) Mariam Kamal

1	(Mexico) Diana Garcia

1	(Colombia) Silvia Angulo

== See also ==
- Federation of Panamerica
- Squash at the Pan American Games
