= Lucía Bautista =

Colombian squash player (born 2002)

Personal information
- Born: December 6, 2002 (age 23) Bucaramanga, Colombia

Sport
- Country: Colombia
- Turned pro: 2019
- Retired: Active
- Racquet used: Eye

Women's singles
- Highest ranking: No. 73 (July 2025)
- Current ranking: No. 89 (August 2025)
- Title: 2
- Tour final: 5
Medal record
Representing Colombia
Women's squash
Event	1st	2nd	3rd
Pan American Games	1	0	1
Pan American Championships	4	2	8
CAC Games	0	2	1
South American Games	4	0	0
Bolivarian Games	4	2	0
Junior Pan American Games	0	1	1
Total	13	7	11
Pan American Games
Gold medal – first place	2023 Santiago	Doubles
Bronze medal – third place	2023 Santiago	Team
Pan American Championships
Gold medal – first place	2022 Guatemala City	Mixed doubles
Gold medal – first place	2022 Guatemala City	Team
Gold medal – first place	2024 Lima	Doubles
Gold medal – first place	2026 Asunción	Mixed doubles
Silver medal – second place	2023 Cartagena	Doubles
Silver medal – second place	2024 Lima	Team
Bronze medal – third place	2018 George Town	Team
Bronze medal – third place	2023 Cartagena	Singles
Bronze medal – third place	2023 Cartagena	Team
Bronze medal – third place	2024 Lima	Singles
Bronze medal – third place	2025 Rio de Janeiro	Doubles
Bronze medal – third place	2025 Rio de Janeiro	Team
Bronze medal – third place	2026 Asunción	Singles
Bronze medal – third place	2026 Asunción	Team
Central American and Caribbean Games
Silver medal – second place	2026 Santo Domingo	Mixed doubles
Silver medal – second place	2026 Santo Domingo	Team
Bronze medal – third place	2026 Santo Domingo	Singles
South American Games
Gold medal – first place	2018 Cochabamba	Team
Gold medal – first place	2022 Asunción	Mixed doubles
Gold medal – first place	2022 Asunción	Team
Gold medal – first place	2026 Santa Fe	Singles
Bolivarian Games
Gold medal – first place	2022 Valledupar	Doubles
Gold medal – first place	2022 Valledupar	Team
Gold medal – first place	2025 Lima-Ayacucho	Doubles
Gold medal – first place	2025 Lima-Ayacucho	Team
Silver medal – second place	2022 Valledupar	Singles
Silver medal – second place	2025 Lima-Ayacucho	Singles
Junior Pan American Games
Silver medal – second place	2021 Cali-Valle	Mixed doubles
Bronze medal – third place	2021 Cali-Valle	Singles
- Updated on November 2025

Lucía Bautista (born 6 December 2002 in Bucaramanga) is a Colombian professional squash player. As of September 2024, she was ranked number 77 in the world. She won the 2023 Regatas Resistencia Open tournament of the world tour.
