= Squash at the 2018 South American Games =

- Venue: Coliseo Polifuncional Evo Morales
- Dates: 2–7 June
- Nations: 10

There were 7 squash events at the 2018 South American Games in Cochabamba, Bolivia. 3 for men and 3 for women and one mixed. The events were held between June 2 and 7 at the Coliseo Polifuncional Evo Morales.

== Events ==
Event	Gold	Silver	Bronze
Men's singles	Diego Elías; Peru	Juan Camilo Vargas; Colombia	Juan Felipe Tovar; Colombia
Men's singles	Diego Elías; Peru	Juan Camilo Vargas; Colombia	Robertino Pezzota; Argentina
Women's singles	Catalina Peláez; Colombia	Laura Tovar; Colombia	María Tovar; Colombia
Women's singles	Catalina Peláez; Colombia	Laura Tovar; Colombia	Lujan Palacios; Paraguay
Men's doubles	Alonso Escudero; Diego Elías; Peru	Carlos Nicolás Caballero; Esteban Casarino; Paraguay	Edgar Alexander Ramírez; Ronald Palomino; Juan Camilo Vargas*; Colombia
Men's doubles	Alonso Escudero; Diego Elías; Peru	Carlos Nicolás Caballero; Esteban Casarino; Paraguay	Francesco Obregon; Robertino Pezzota; Argentina
Women's doubles	Laura Tovar; María Tovar; Colombia	Camila Grasso; Pilar Etchechoury; Argentina	Ana María Pinto; Giselle Delgado; Chile
Women's doubles	Laura Tovar; María Tovar; Colombia	Camila Grasso; Pilar Etchechoury; Argentina	Andrea Gabriela Soria; Maria Paula Moya; Ecuador
Mixed doubles	Catalina Peláez; Ronald Palomino; Colombia	Federico Cioffi; Antonella Falcione; Argentina	Maximiliano Camiruaga; Sandra Pinto Arias; Chile
Mixed doubles	Catalina Peláez; Ronald Palomino; Colombia	Federico Cioffi; Antonella Falcione; Argentina	David Costales; María Caridad Buenaño; Ecuador
Men's Team	Alonso Escudero; Diego Elías; Andrés Duany; Rafael Gálvez; Peru	Federico Cioffi; Leandro Romiglio; Francesco Obregon; Robertino Pezzota; Argentina	Edgar Ramírez; Juan Felipe Tovar; Juan Camilo Vargas; Ronald Palomino; Colombia
Men's Team	Alonso Escudero; Diego Elías; Andrés Duany; Rafael Gálvez; Peru	Federico Cioffi; Leandro Romiglio; Francesco Obregon; Robertino Pezzota; Argentina	Jaime Pinto; Rafael Allendes; Maximiliano Camiruaga; Chile
Women's Team	Catalina Peláez; Lucía Bautista; Laura Tovar; María Tovar; Colombia	Camila Grasso; Antonella Falcione; Lorena Pascuzzi; Pilar Etchechoury; Argentina	Maria Paula Moya; María Caridad Buenaño; Andrea Gabriela Soria; Ecuador
Women's Team	Catalina Peláez; Lucía Bautista; Laura Tovar; María Tovar; Colombia	Camila Grasso; Antonella Falcione; Lorena Pascuzzi; Pilar Etchechoury; Argentina	Ana Maria Pinto; Giselle Delgado; Sandra Pinto Arias; Chile
