= Danielle Letourneau =

Canadian professional squash player (born 1993)

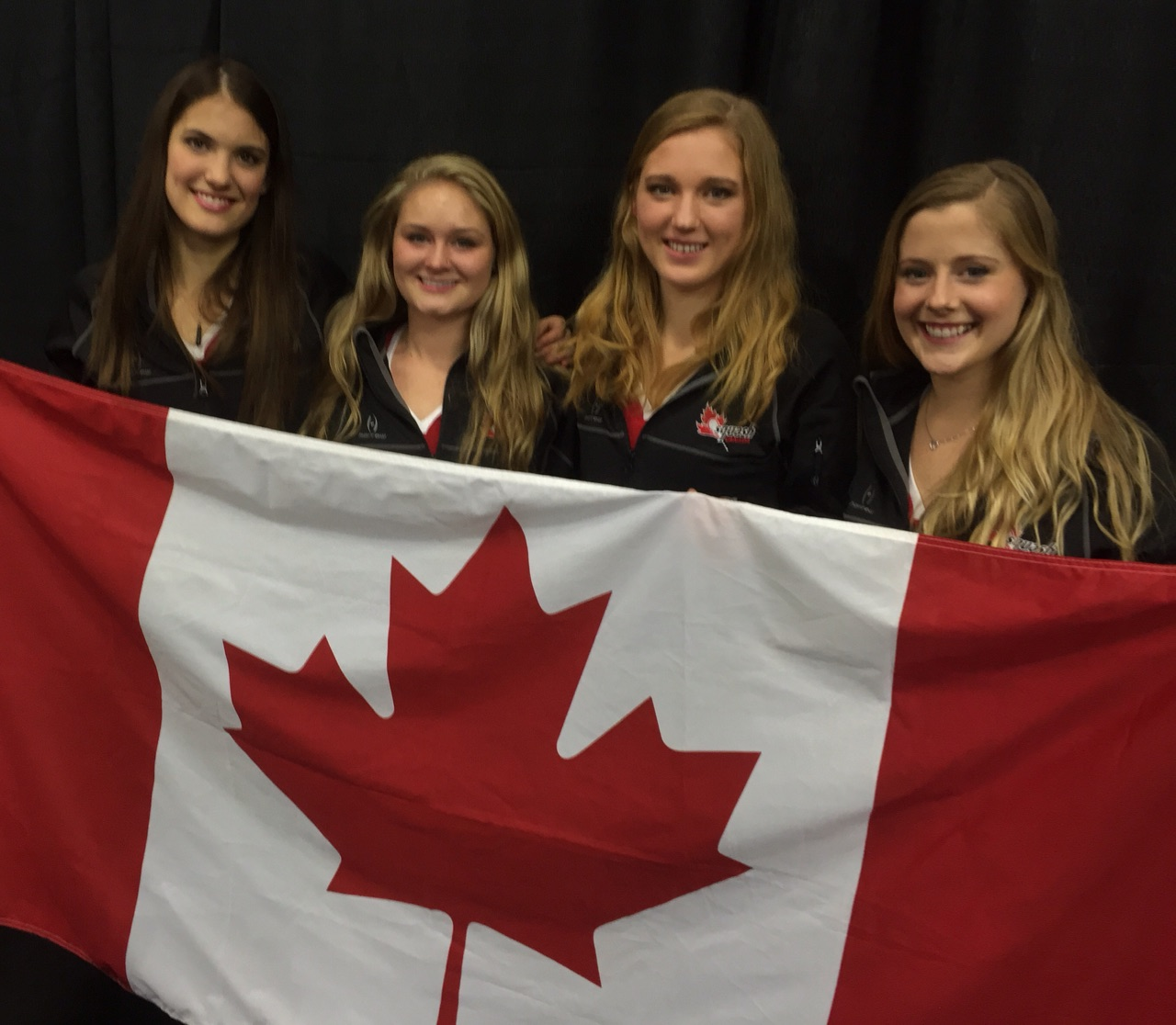
- Letourneau at the 2014 World Championships (second from right)

Personal information
- Born: May 3, 1993 (age 33) Calgary, Alberta, Canada

Sport
- Country: Canada
- Turned pro: 2015
- Coached by: Omar Azabawy; David Letourneau; Julee Devoy
- Retired: 2026
- Racquet used: Gearbox 135, Dunlop

Women's singles
- Highest ranking: No. 18 (December 2021)
- Current ranking: No. 37 (December 2022)
Medal record
Women's Squash
Representing Canada
Pan American Games
Silver medal – second place	2019 Lima	Doubles
Silver medal – second place	2019 Lima	Team
Pan American Championships
Silver medal – second place	2024 Lima	Singles

Danielle Catherine Letourneau (born May 3, 1993) is a retired Canadian professional squash player. She represented Canada multiple times internationally, including earning two silver medals at the 2019 Pan American Games in women's doubles and the women's team event and a silver medal in women's singles at the 2024 Pan American Squash Championships. Letourneau reached a career-high world ranking of World No. 18 in December 2021.

== Junior and collegiate years ==
Letourneau won three Canadian Junior Championships. She won Girls U13 in 2006, U15 in 2008, and U19 in 2011. She also won Women's A at the Canadian Championships in 2007, when she was still a junior player.

Letourneau attended Cornell University from 2011 to 2015, and was the #1 player on the women's team all four years there. She amassed a record of 42-23, and was selected to both the All-Ivy League first team and All American first team all four years at Cornell. Letourneau was inducted into the Cornell Big Red Hall of Fame in 2025.

== Senior career ==
Letourneau was Canadian Women's Open champion twice: in 2018 and 2021.

Letourneau was part of Team Canada for the 2019 Pan American Games. She and Samantha Cornett reached the final of the women's doubles event, losing to the USA, resulting in silver medals. Letourneau also got silver in the women's team event, when Canada again lost to the USA in the final.

She was named to the 2023 Pan Am Games team, but was unable to compete, and replaced by Nikki Todd.

Letourneau was runner up in women's singles at the 2024 Pan American Squash Championships to team-mate Nicole Bunyan in the final.

She won 124 of 241 matches on the PSA Tour, including winning six titles from nine finals appearances.

== Personal ==
A knee injury led to Letourneau's retirement. Her brother, David, was also a Canadian Junior Champion and played pro squash.

Letourneau majored in communications at Cornell with a minor in international relations.
