= Ronald Palomino =

Colombian squash player (born 1998)

Personal information
- Born: December 20, 1998 (age 27) Cali, Colombia
- Height: 1.90 m (6 ft 3 in)
- Weight: 81 kg (179 lb)

Sport
- Country: Colombia
- Turned pro: 2020
- Coached by: Delio Escobar
- Retired: Active
- Racquet used: Tecnifibre

Men's singles
- Highest ranking: No. 68 (September 2025)
- Current ranking: No. 68 (September 2025)
- Title: 9
Medal record
Representing Colombia
Men's squash
| Event | 1st | 2nd | 3rd |
|---|---|---|---|
| Pan American Games | 2 | 0 | 0 |
| Pan American Championships | 5 | 1 | 1 |
| South American Games | 2 | 1 | 4 |
| Bolivarian Games | 4 | 2 | 0 |
| Total | 13 | 4 | 5 |
Pan American Games
| Gold medal – first place | 2023 Santiago | Doubles |
| Gold medal – first place | 2023 Santiago | Team |
Pan American Championships
| Gold medal – first place | 2024 Lima | Doubles |
| Gold medal – first place | 2024 Lima | Team |
| Gold medal – first place | 2025 Rio de Janeiro | Singles |
| Gold medal – first place | 2025 Rio de Janeiro | Doubles |
| Gold medal – first place | 2026 Asunción | Mixed doubles |
| Silver medal – second place | 2024 Lima | Singles |
| Bronze medal – third place | 2026 Asunción | Team |
South American Games
| Gold medal – first place | 2018 Cochabamba | Mixed doubles |
| Gold medal – first place | 2022 Asunción | Mixed doubles |
| Silver medal – second place | 2022 Asunción | Singles |
| Bronze medal – third place | 2018 Cochabamba | Doubles |
| Bronze medal – third place | 2018 Cochabamba | Team |
| Bronze medal – third place | 2022 Asunción | Team |
| Bronze medal – third place | 2026 Santa Fe | Singles |
Bolivarian Games
| Gold medal – first place | 2017 Santa Marta | Team |
| Gold medal – first place | 2022 Valledupar | Team |
| Gold medal – first place | 2025 Lima-Ayacucho | Mixed doubles |
| Gold medal – first place | 2025 Lima-Ayacucho | Team |
| Silver medal – second place | 2017 Santa Marta | Doubles |
| Silver medal – second place | 2025 Lima-Ayacucho | Singles |

Ronald Palomino Galeano (born 20 December 1998) is a Colombian professional squash player. He reached a career high ranking of 68 in the world during September 2025.

== Career ==
In 2024, Palomino won his 8th PSA title after securing victory in the Costa Rica Open during the 2024–25 PSA Squash Tour.

Palomino secured a 9th PSA title by winning the Costa Rica Open during the 2025–26 PSA Squash Tour.
