= Andrés Herrera (squash player) =

Colombian squash player (born 1996)

Personal information
- Full name: Andrés Felipe Herrera Gonzalez
- Born: May 6, 1996 (age 30) Bogotá, Colombia
- Height: 1.76 m (5 ft 9 in)
- Weight: 68 kg (150 lb)

Sport
- Country: Colombia
- Turned pro: 2015
- Coached by: Julio Herrera; Mohamed Elkey
- Racquet used: Tecnifibre

Men's singles
- Highest ranking: No. 92 (November 2024)
- Current ranking: No. 131 (August 2025)
- Title: 1
- Tour final: 8
Medal record
Representing Colombia
Men's squash
Event	1st	2nd	3rd
World Doubles Championships	0	0	1
Pan American Games	1	1	0
Pan American Championships	3	0	2
CAC Games	0	4	0
South American Games	1	0	1
Bolivarian Games	4	0	2
Total	9	5	6
World Doubles Championships
Bronze medal – third place	2019 Carrara	Doubles
Pan American Games
Gold medal – first place	2015 Toronto	Doubles
Silver medal – second place	2019 Lima	Team
Pan American Championships
Gold medal – first place	2017 Buenos Aires	Doubles
Gold medal – first place	2022 Guatemala City	Doubles
Gold medal – first place	2022 Guatemala City	Team
Bronze medal – third place	2016 Hartford	Team
Bronze medal – third place	2017 Buenos Aires	Team
Central American and Caribbean Games
Silver medal – second place	2014 Veracruz	Doubles
Silver medal – second place	2014 Veracruz	Team
Silver medal – second place	2018 Barranquilla	Doubles
Silver medal – second place	2018 Barranquilla	Team
South American Games
Gold medal – first place	2022 Asunción	Doubles
Bronze medal – third place	2022 Asunción	Team
Bolivarian Games
Gold medal – first place	2013 Trujillo	Team
Gold medal – first place	2022 Valledupar	Doubles
Gold medal – first place	2022 Valledupar	Team
Gold medal – first place	2025 Lima-Ayacucho	Team
Bronze medal – third place	2013 Trujillo	Doubles
Bronze medal – third place	2025 Lima-Ayacucho	Doubles
- Updated on November 2025

Andrés Felipe Herrera (born May 6, 1996) is a professional male squash player who represented Colombia. He reached a career-high world ranking of World No. 92 in November 2024.

== Career ==
In August 2024, he won his first PSA title after securing victory in the RGSA Open during the 2024–25 PSA Squash Tour.
