= Anderson Cardona =

Colombian squash player (born 1988)

Personal information
- Born: June 7, 1988 (age 38) Cali, Colombia
- Height: 1.81 m (5 ft 11 in)
- Weight: 71 kg (157 lb)

Sport
- Country: Colombia
- Coached by: Delio Escobar
- Retired: Active
- Racquet used: Dunlop

Men's singles
- Highest ranking: No. 246 (January, 2013)
- Updated on July, 2013

Anderson Cardona (born June 7, 1988) is a professional male squash player who represents Colombia. He reached a career-high world ranking of World No. 246 in January 2013.
