= Laura Tovar Pérez =

Colombian squash player (born 1996)

Personal information
- Born: November 10, 1996 (age 29) Bogotá, Colombia
- Height: 1.70 m (5 ft 7 in)
- Weight: 65 kg (143 lb)

Sport
- Country: Colombia
- Retired: Active
- Racquet used: Black Knight

Women's singles
- Highest ranking: 80 (January 2024)
- Current ranking: 113 (August 2025)
- Title: 3
- Tour final: 8
Medal record
Representing Colombia
Women's squash
Event	1st	2nd	3rd
Pan American Games	1	0	5
Pan American Championships	4	6	7
CAC Games	2	5	2
South American Games	5	1	0
Bolivarian Games	10	1	1
Total	22	13	15
Pan American Games
Gold medal – first place	2023 Santiago	Doubles
Bronze medal – third place	2015 Toronto	Doubles
Bronze medal – third place	2015 Toronto	Team
Bronze medal – third place	2019 Lima	Doubles
Bronze medal – third place	2019 Lima	Team
Bronze medal – third place	2023 Santiago	Team
Pan American Championships
Gold medal – first place	2012 Ambato	Doubles
Gold medal – first place	2022 Guatemala City	Doubles
Gold medal – first place	2022 Guatemala City	Team
Gold medal – first place	2026 Asunción	Doubles
Silver medal – second place	2012 Ambato	Team
Silver medal – second place	2014 Toluca	Doubles
Silver medal – second place	2017 Buenos Aires	Team
Silver medal – second place	2018 George Town	Doubles
Silver medal – second place	2022 Guatemala City	Singles
Silver medal – second place	2023 Cartagena	Doubles
Bronze medal – third place	2017 Buenos Aires	Singles
Bronze medal – third place	2017 Buenos Aires	Doubles
Bronze medal – third place	2018 George Town	Team
Bronze medal – third place	2023 Cartagena	Team
Bronze medal – third place	2025 Rio de Janeiro	Doubles
Bronze medal – third place	2025 Rio de Janeiro	Team
Bronze medal – third place	2026 Asunción	Team
Central American and Caribbean Games
Gold medal – first place	2018 Barranquilla	Doubles
Gold medal – first place	2026 Santo Domingo	Doubles
Silver medal – second place	2014 Veracruz	Singles
Silver medal – second place	2014 Veracruz	Doubles
Silver medal – second place	2014 Veracruz	Team
Silver medal – second place	2018 Barranquilla	Team
Silver medal – second place	2026 Santo Domingo	Team
Bronze medal – third place	2018 Barranquilla	Singles
Bronze medal – third place	2026 Santo Domingo	Singles
South American Games
Gold medal – first place	2018 Cochabamba	Doubles
Gold medal – first place	2018 Cochabamba	Team
Gold medal – first place	2022 Asunción	Singles
Gold medal – first place	2022 Asunción	Doubles
Gold medal – first place	2022 Asunción	Team
Silver medal – second place	2018 Cochabamba	Singles
Bolivarian Games
Gold medal – first place	2013 Trujillo	Singles
Gold medal – first place	2013 Trujillo	Doubles
Gold medal – first place	2013 Trujillo	Team
Gold medal – first place	2017 Santa Marta	Doubles
Gold medal – first place	2017 Santa Marta	Team
Gold medal – first place	2022 Valledupar	Mixed doubles
Gold medal – first place	2022 Valledupar	Team
Gold medal – first place	2025 Lima-Ayacucho	Singles
Gold medal – first place	2025 Lima-Ayacucho	Doubles
Gold medal – first place	2025 Lima-Ayacucho	Team
Silver medal – second place	2017 Santa Marta	Singles
Bronze medal – third place	2022 Valledupar	Singles
- Updated on 29 November 2025

Laura Viviana Tovar Pérez (born November 10, 1996) is a Colombian professional squash player. She reached a career high ranking of 80 in the world during January 2024.

== Biography ==
She has represented her country. In June 2025, she won her 4th PSA title after securing victory in the Life Time Mississauga Challenger during the 2024–25 PSA Squash Tour.
