= Meagan Best =

Barbadian squash player (born 2002)

Personal information
- Born: 26 April 2002 (age 24) Bridgetown, Barbados
- Website: meaganbest.com

Sport
- Country: Barbados

women's singles
- Highest ranking: 208 (January 2018)
- Current ranking: 243 (April 2018)
Medal record
Representing Barbados
Women's squash
Pan American Games
Bronze medal – third place	2023 Santiago	Doubles
Bronze medal – third place	2023 Santiago	Team

Meagan Best (born 26 April 2002) is a Barbadian squash player. She is currently considered as the leading squash player to represent Barbados at international level. She achieved her career-high ranking of World No. 208 in January 2018 and was ranked 243 as of April 2018.

== Career ==
She rose to prominence in her squash career after winning the Girl's U17 category at the US Junior Open squash championship in 2017. With her 2017 U17 win, Meagan became the first squash player from a Caribbean nation to win a US Junior Open squash championship title.

Meagan was one of the members of the Barbados contingent for the 2018 Commonwealth Games just at the age of fifteen and was also the flagbearer for Barbados at the 2018 Commonwealth Games during the opening ceremony of the 2018 Commonwealth Games Parade of Nations. She was scheduled to compete in the women's singles and mixed doubles events at the Gold Coast Commonwealth Games.

She also went onto qualify for the plate final event at the women's singles event during the Gold Coast Commonwealth Games. Meagan also became the first Barbadian squash player to qualify for final round of an international squash tournament. In the plate final of the women's singles during the 2018 Commonwealth Games she defeated Mihiliya Methsarani of Sri Lanka 3–1 to secure the plate title.
