= Leonel Cárdenas =

Mexican squash player (born 2000)

Personal information
- Born: February 8, 2000 (age 26) Tlalnepantla de Baz, Mexico

Sport
- Country: Mexican
- Retired: Active
- Racquet used: Head

Men's singles
- Highest ranking: No. 12 (November 2025)
- Current ranking: No. 12 (November 2025)
- Title: 19
Medal record
Representing Mexico
Men's squash
Pan American Games
Silver medal – second place	2023 Santiago	Doubles
Bronze medal – third place	2023 Santiago	Singles
Central American and Caribbean Games
Gold medal – first place	2026 Santo Domingo	Singles
Silver medal – second place	2026 Santo Domingo	Team
Bronze medal – third place	2026 Santo Domingo	Doubles
Junior Pan American Games
Gold medal – first place	2021 Cali-Valle	Singles
Gold medal – first place	2021 Cali-Valle	Mixed doubles
Gold medal – first place	2021 Cali-Valle	Team

Leonel Cárdenas, also known as Leonel Cárdenas Mora, also spelled Cárdenas (born 8 February 2000) is a Mexican professional squash player. He reached a career high ranking of 12 in the world during November 2025.

== Career ==
In 2017 he won the Country Club Cochabamba Bolivia Open professional PSA tournament.

In 2024, Cárdenas won his 16th PSA title after securing victory in the Canadian Classic during the 2024–25 PSA Squash Tour. At a world ranking high of 16 he won a 17th PSA title at the Manchester Open.

An 18th and 19th title followed in quick succession, after securing victory in the Toronto Open and St. James Open during the 2025–26 PSA Squash Tour.
