= David Baillargeon =

Canadian squash player (born 1996)

Personal information
- Born: March 14, 1996 (age 30) Lévis, Quebec, Canada
- Education: McGill
- Height: 178 cm (5 ft 10 in)
- Weight: 76 kg (168 lb)

Sport
- Country: Canada
- Coached by: Yvon Provençal
- Retired: Active
- Racquet used: Harrow
- Highest ranking: No. 39 (October 2023)
- Current ranking: No. 190 (April 2026)
Medal record
Representing Canada
Men's squash
Pan American Games
Bronze medal – third place	2023 Santiago	Team
- Updated on October 2024

David Baillargeon (born 14 March 1996 in Quebec) is a Canadian professional squash player. As of April 2026, he was ranked number 190 in the world. He has competed in the main draw of multiple professional PSA tournaments.
