= Jeremías Azaña =

Argentinian squash player (born 2000)

Personal information
- Born: 28 July 2000 (age 25) Córdoba, Argentina

Sport
- Country: Argentina
- Handedness: Right-handed
- Turned pro: 2018
- Coached by: Aldasoro Guillermo
- Retired: Active

Men's singles
- Highest ranking: No. 69 (November 2024)
- Current ranking: No. 69 (December 2024)
Medal record
Representing Argentina
Men's squash
Pan American Games
Silver medal – second place	2023 Santiago	Team

Jeremías Azaña (born 28 July 2000) is an Argentinian professional squash player. He reached a career high ranking of 69 in the world during December 2024.

== Career ==
He won the 2022 Kinetic tournament.

In 2024, Azaña won his 2nd PSA title after securing victory in the St. Louis Open during the 2024–25 PSA Squash Tour.
