= Juan Camilo Vargas =

Colombian squash player (born 1994)

Personal information
- Full name: Juan Camilo Vargas Heredia
- Born: April 18, 1994 (age 32) Bogotá, Colombia
- Height: 1.74 m (5 ft 9 in)
- Weight: 65 kg (143 lb)

Sport
- Country: Colombia
- Handedness: Right Handed
- Retired: Active
- Racquet used: Head

Men's singles
- Highest ranking: No. 34 (June 2025)
- Current ranking: No. 34 (August 2025)
- Title: 9
- Tour final: 17
Medal record
Representing Colombia
Men's squash
Event	1st	2nd	3rd
World Doubles Championships	0	0	1
Pan American Games	3	1	0
Pan American Championships	8	3	4
CAC Games	2	4	1
South American Games	1	1	4
Bolivarian Games	3	2	1
Total	17	11	11
World Doubles Championships
Bronze medal – third place	2019 Carrara	Doubles
Pan American Games
Gold medal – first place	2015 Toronto	Doubles
Gold medal – first place	2023 Santiago	Doubles
Gold medal – first place	2023 Santiago	Team
Silver medal – second place	2019 Lima	Team
Pan American Championships
Gold medal – first place	2017 Buenos Aires	Doubles
Gold medal – first place	2022 Guatemala City	Doubles
Gold medal – first place	2022 Guatemala City	Team
Gold medal – first place	2023 Cartagena	Team
Gold medal – first place	2024 Lima	Doubles
Gold medal – first place	2024 Lima	Team
Gold medal – first place	2025 Rio de Janeiro	Doubles
Gold medal – first place	2026 Asunción	Doubles
Silver medal – second place	2018 George Town	Team
Silver medal – second place	2022 Guatemala City	Singles
Silver medal – second place	2023 Cartagena	Singles
Bronze medal – third place	2010 Guatemala City	Doubles
Bronze medal – third place	2016 Hartford	Team
Bronze medal – third place	2017 Buenos Aires	Team
Bronze medal – third place	2026 Asunción	Team
Central American and Caribbean Games
Gold medal – first place	2026 Santo Domingo	Doubles
Gold medal – first place	2026 Santo Domingo	Team
Silver medal – second place	2014 Veracruz	Doubles
Silver medal – second place	2014 Veracruz	Team
Silver medal – second place	2018 Barranquilla	Doubles
Silver medal – second place	2018 Barranquilla	Team
Bronze medal – third place	2026 Santo Domingo	Singles
South American Games
Gold medal – first place	2022 Asunción	Doubles
Silver medal – second place	2018 Cochabamba	Singles
Bronze medal – third place	2018 Cochabamba	Doubles
Bronze medal – third place	2018 Cochabamba	Team
Bronze medal – third place	2022 Asunción	Singles
Bronze medal – third place	2022 Asunción	Team
Bolivarian Games
Gold medal – first place	2017 Santa Marta	Team
Gold medal – first place	2022 Valledupar	Doubles
Gold medal – first place	2022 Valledupar	Team
Silver medal – second place	2017 Santa Marta	Doubles
Silver medal – second place	2022 Valledupar	Singles
Bronze medal – third place	2017 Santa Marta	Singles
- Updated on August 2025

Juan Camilo Vargas (born 18 April 1994, in Bogotá) is a Colombian professional squash player. He reached a career high ranking of 34 in the world during June 2025.
