= Squash at the 2023 Pan American Games =

- Squash pictogram
- Venue: Centro de Entrenamiento del Tenis y Deportes de Raqueta
- Start date: October 31, 2023
- End date: November 5, 2023
- No. of events: 7 (3 men, 3 women, 1 mixed)
- Competitors: 50 from 10 nations

Squash competitions at the 2023 Pan American Games in Santiago, Chile were held at the Centro de Entrenamiento del Tenis y Deportes de Raqueta from October 31 to November 5.

Seven medal events were contested, a singles, doubles and team event for each gender along with a mixed doubles event.

== Qualification ==
A total of 50 squash athletes (25 men and 25 women) will qualify to compete. Each nation may enter a maximum of 6 athletes (three per gender), except for the NOCs that have qualified in Cali 2021. The host nation, Chile automatically qualified the maximum team size. Other seven men's and women's teams (of three athletes) will qualify through different qualification tournaments.

== Participating nations ==
A total of 10 countries qualified athletes. The number of athletes a nation has entered is in parentheses beside the name of the country.

- Argentina (3)
- Barbados (3)
- Canada (6)
- Chile (6)
- Colombia (6)
- Ecuador (3)
- Independent Athletes Team (6)
- Mexico (7)
- Peru (3)
- United States (7)

== Medal summary ==
=== Medal table ===
* Host nation (Chile)

Rank	NOC's	Gold	Silver	Bronze	Total
1	United States	3	2	1	6
2	Colombia	3	1	2	6
3	Peru	1	0	2	3
4	Canada	0	2	2	4
5	Mexico	0	1	2	3
6	Argentina	0	1	0	1
7	Barbados	0	0	2	2
7	Independent Athletes Team	0	0	2	2
9	Chile*	0	0	1	1
Totals (9 entries)		7	7	14	28

== Medalists ==
=== Men's events ===
Event	Gold	Silver	Bronze
Singles	Diego Elías; Peru	Miguel Ángel Rodríguez; Colombia	Leonel Cárdenas; Mexico
Singles	Diego Elías; Peru	Miguel Ángel Rodríguez; Colombia	César Salazar; Mexico
Doubles	Colombia; Juan Camilo Vargas; Ronald Palomino	Mexico; Leonel Cárdenas; César Salazar	Peru; Diego Elías; Alonso Escudero
Doubles	Colombia; Juan Camilo Vargas; Ronald Palomino	Mexico; Leonel Cárdenas; César Salazar	Independent Athletes Team; Josué Enríquez; Alejandro Enríquez
Team	Colombia; Juan Camilo Vargas; Ronald Palomino; Miguel Ángel Rodríguez	Argentina; Robertino Pezzota; Leandro Romiglio; Jeremías Azaña	Canada; David Baillargeon; Graeme Schnell; George Crowne
Team	Colombia; Juan Camilo Vargas; Ronald Palomino; Miguel Ángel Rodríguez	Argentina; Robertino Pezzota; Leandro Romiglio; Jeremías Azaña	Peru; Diego Elías; Alonso Escudero; Rafael Gálvez

=== Women's events ===
Event	Gold	Silver	Bronze
Singles	Olivia Weaver; United States	Amanda Sobhy; United States	Marina Stefanoni; United States
Singles	Olivia Weaver; United States	Amanda Sobhy; United States	Hollie Naughton; Canada
Doubles	Colombia; Laura Tovar; Lucía Bautista	United States; Amanda Sobhy; Olivia Weaver	Chile; Giselle Delgado; Ana María Pinto
Doubles	Colombia; Laura Tovar; Lucía Bautista	United States; Amanda Sobhy; Olivia Weaver	Barbados; Meagan Best; Margot Prow
Team	United States; Amanda Sobhy; Olivia Clyne; Olivia Weaver	Canada; Nikki Todd; Hollie Naughton; Nicole Bunyan	Barbados; Meagan Best; Amanda Haywood; Margot Prow
Team	United States; Amanda Sobhy; Olivia Clyne; Olivia Weaver	Canada; Nikki Todd; Hollie Naughton; Nicole Bunyan	Colombia; Catalina Peláez; Laura Tovar; Lucía Bautista

=== Mixed events ===
Event	Gold	Silver	Bronze
Doubles	United States; Olivia Clyne; Timothy Brownell	Canada; Nicole Bunyan; George Crowne	Independent Athletes Team; Tabita Gaitán; Luis Quinquinay
Doubles	United States; Olivia Clyne; Timothy Brownell	Canada; Nicole Bunyan; George Crowne	Colombia; Catalina Peláez; Miguel Ángel Rodríguez
