= Giselle Delgado =

Chilean squash player (born 1988)

Personal information
- Full name: Giselle Paulina Delgado Castillo
- Born: 17 March 1988 (age 38) Antofagasta, Chile
- Years active: 2013-2018

Sport
- Country: Chile
- Handedness: right-handed
- Racquet used: Head Speed 120 SB

women's singles
- Highest ranking: 117 (March 2017)
- Current ranking: 218 (December 2018)
Medal record
Women's squash
Representing Chile
Pan American Games
Bronze medal – third place	2019 Lima	Doubles
Bronze medal – third place	2023 Santiago	Doubles
South American Games
Bronze medal – third place	2018 Cochabamba	Doubles
Bronze medal – third place	2018 Cochabamba	Team
Bronze medal – third place	2022 Asunción	Doubles
Bronze medal – third place	2022 Asunción	Team

Giselle Paulina Delgado Castillo (born 17 March 1988) is a Chilean female professional squash player and also serves as a coach. Giselle achieved her career-high ranking of World No. 117 in March 2017 during the 2016-17 PSA World Tour.

She moved to Canada in 2002 and currently resides there but has represented her home nation, Chile, in international competitions including the 2018 South American Games and 2019 Pan American Games. She graduated from the University of Western Ontario in 2006.

She claimed two bronze medals in women's doubles and women's team events at the 2019 Pan American Games representing Chile.
