= Alejandro Enríquez =

Guatemalan squash player (born 2000)

Personal information
- Born: January 17, 2000 (age 26) Guatemala City, Guatemala

Sport
- Country: Guatemala
- Turned pro: 2018
- Retired: Active

Men's singles
- Highest ranking: No. 77 (July 2024)
- Current ranking: No. 77 (July 2024)
Medal record
Representing Independent Athletes Team
Men's squash
Pan American Games
Bronze medal – third place	2023 Santiago	Doubles

Alejandro Enríquez, also known as Junior Enríquez Franco (born 17 January 2000 in Guatemala City) is a Guatemalan professional squash player. As of July 2024, he was ranked number 77 in the world. He won the 2022 Squash Inn Classic.
