= Diego Elías =

Peruvian squash player (born 1996)

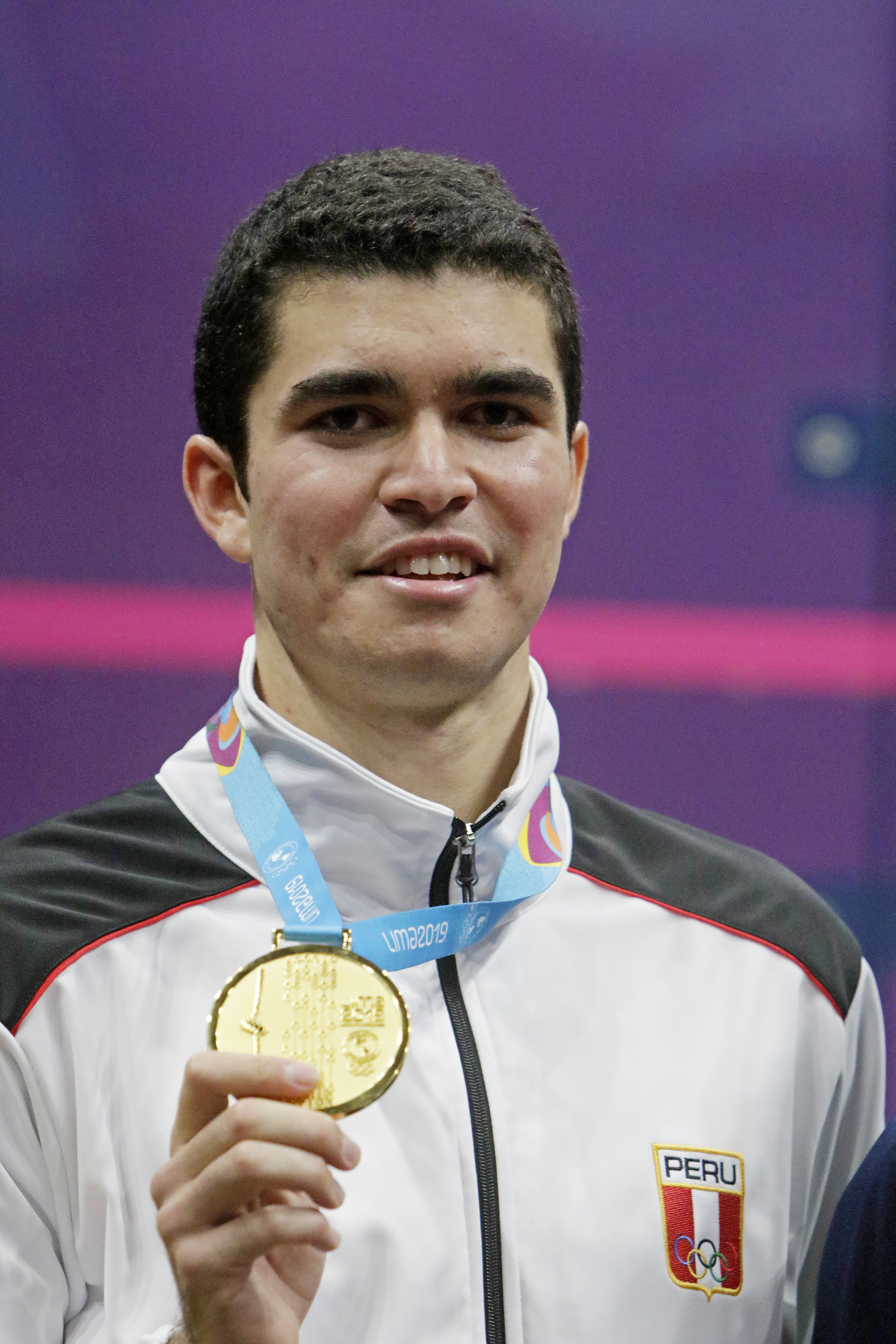
- Diego Elías (2019)

Personal information
- Nationality: Peruvian
- Born: November 19, 1996 (age 29) Lima, Peru
- Height: 1.88 m (6 ft 2 in)
- Weight: 78 kg (172 lb)

Sport
- Handedness: Right Handed
- Coached by: Jonathon Power, Wael El Hindi, Josí Manuel Elías, Santiago Parra
- Racquet used: Dunlop Precision Elite

Men's singles
- Highest ranking: No. 1 (April 2023)
- Current ranking: No. 3 (October 2026)
- Title: 23
- World Open: W (2023–24)
- PSA Profile
Medal record
Representing Peru
Men's squash
World Championships
Gold medal – first place	2024 Cairo	Singles
Bronze medal – third place	2025 Chicago	Singles
British Open
Gold medal – first place	2025 Birmingham	Singles
Silver medal – second place	2023 Birmingham	Singles
Pan American Games
Gold medal – first place	2019 Lima	Singles
Gold medal – first place	2023 Santiago	Singles
Silver medal – second place	2015 Toronto	Singles
Bronze medal – third place	2015 Toronto	Doubles
Bronze medal – third place	2019 Lima	Doubles
Bronze medal – third place	2023 Santiago	Doubles
Bronze medal – third place	2023 Santiago	Team
South American Games
Gold medal – first place	2018 Cochabamba	Singles
Gold medal – first place	2018 Cochabamba	Doubles
Gold medal – first place	2018 Cochabamba	Team
Bolivarian Games
Gold medal – first place	2017 Santa Marta	Doubles
Silver medal – second place	2017 Santa Marta	Singles
Silver medal – second place	2017 Santa Marta	Team
Silver medal – second place	2022 Valledupar	Doubles
Silver medal – second place	2022 Valledupar	Team
World Junior Championships
Gold medal – first place	2014 Windhoek	Singles
Gold medal – first place	2015 Eindhoven	Singles

Diego Elías Chehab (born November 19, 1996, in Lima) is a squash player who represents Peru. He was the 2023–24 World Champion. In April 2023, he reached a ranking of number 1 in the world, the first South American player in squash history to do so.

== Career ==
His accomplishments include winning World Junior Championships twice, British Junior Open twice, and the US Junior Open in Boys' U15, U17, and U19. On July 27, 2019, he won a gold medal at the 2019 Pan American Games in Lima, Peru. In October 2021, Elías won the Qatar QTerminals Classic, his first PSA World Tour Platinum title. Elias emerged victorious at the Necker Mauritius Open, a PSA Gold tournament, in June 2022.

In 2023, Elías reached his first British Open final, losing out to Ali Farag in the 2023 Men's British Open Squash Championship. Shortly afterwards, he reached the quarter final of the 2023 PSA Men's World Squash Championship losing to Karim Abdel Gawad in the quarter final.

In 2024, he won the 2023–24 PSA World Championship, becoming the first South American player in squash history to clinch this title. In May 2025, Elías reached the semi-final of the 2025 Men's World Squash Championship in Chicago but was defeated by eventual champion Mostafa Asal. In June 2025, Elias defeated the No. 1 ranked Asal in the final of the 2025 Men's British Open Squash Championship, winning the prestigious 86th British Open title for the first time.

In May 2026 he reached the semi-final of the 2026 Men's World Squash Championship.

== Titles and Finals ==
=== Major Finals (8) ===
Major tournaments include:

- PSA World Championships
- PSA World Tour Finals
- Top-tier PSA World Tour tournaments (Platinum/World Series/Super Series)

Year/Season	Tournament	Opponent	Result	Score
2021	Qatar Classic	Paul Coll	Win (1)	13–11 5–11 13–11 11–9
2022	U.S. Open	Ali Farag	Win (2)	2–0 (retired)
2022	Hong Kong Open	Mostafa Asal	Loss (1)	11–6 11–6 10–12 9–11 4–11
2023	Tournament of Champions	Marwan El Shorbagy	Win (3)	11–2 11–6 11–4
2023	British Open	Ali Farag	Loss (2)	11–13 11–5 8–11 9–11
2022–23	PSA World Tour Finals	Mostafa Asal	Loss (3)	11–9 6–11 3–11 5–11
2023	Paris Squash	Ali Farag	Loss (4)	11–2 11–13 1–11 9–11
2023	Qatar Classic	Ali Farag	Loss (5)	13–15 5–11 11–8 9–11
2024	Tournament of Champions	Ali Farag	Loss (4)	9–11 12–10 14–12 11–1
2025	British Open	Mostafa Asal	Win (4)	11–4 11–9 3–11 11–4
2026	PSA Squash Tour Finals	Paul Coll	Win (4)	7-11 11-4 11-6 11-9
2026	Egyptian Open	Mostafa Asal	Win (5)	11-5 5-11 6-11 11-7 6-11

== See also ==
- Official Men's Squash World Ranking
