= Timothy Brownell =

American squash player (born 1997)

Personal information
- Born: July 12, 1997 (age 29) Lebanon, New Hampshire, United States
- Height: 6 ft 0 in (183 cm)
- Weight: 154 lb (70 kg)

Sport
- Country: United States
- Handedness: left-handed
- Turned pro: 2015
- Coached by: Chris Brownell
- Retired: Active
- Racquet used: Wilson

Men's singles
- Highest ranking: No. 1 (June 2024)
- Current ranking: No. 1 (October 2025)
- Title: 17
Medal record
Representing United States
Men's squash
Pan American Games
Gold medal – first place	2023 Santiago	Mixed doubles

Timothy Brownell (born July 12, 1997) is an American professional squash player. He reached a career high ranking of 29 in the world during June 2024.

== Biography ==
On June 17, 2022, he won the US Nationals, beating 2nd seed Todd Harrity in straight games. The previous day, in the semifinal, he overcame a two-game deficit to beat top seed Shahjahan Khan. He won his second US National championship in 2024 over second seeded Shahjahan Khan in 4 games. He won his third US National championship in 2025 over sixth seeded Nick Spizzirri in 3 games.

He competed for the Harvard Crimson men's squash team .

In October 2025, he won his 17th PSA title after securing victory in the Charlottesville Open during the 2025–26 PSA Squash Tour.
