= Robertino Pezzota =

Argentinian squash player (born 1983)

Roberto Luciano Pezzota
Personal information
- Born: March 10, 1983 (age 43) Rosario, Argentina
- Height: 1.83 m (6 ft 0 in)
- Weight: 78 kg (172 lb)

Sport
- Country: Argentina
- Turned pro: 2005
- Coached by: Alejandro Ventura
- Retired: Active
- Racquet used: Zyngra

Men's singles and Men´s Doubles
- Highest ranking: No. 73 (December 2018)
- Current ranking: No. 106 (July 2020)
Medal record
Men's squash
Representing Argentina
Pan American Games
Silver medal – second place	2023 Santiago	Team
Bronze medal – third place	2003 Santo Domingo	Team
Bronze medal – third place	2011 Guadalajara	Men´s Doubles
Bronze medal – third place	2019 Lima	Singles
Bronze medal – third place	2015 Toronto	Team
South American Games
Silver medal – second place	2018 Cochabamba	Team
Bronze medal – third place	2018 Cochabamba	Singles
Bronze medal – third place	2018 Cochabamba	Doubles
- Updated on July 2015

Robertino Pezzota (born March 10, 1983) is an Argentinian professional squash player. He reached a career-high world ranking of World No. 73 in December 2018. Pezzota has won four bronze medals at the Pan American Games (2003, 2011, 2015 and 2019).
