= Josué Enríquez =

Guatemalan squash player (born 1994)

Personal information
- Born: November 9, 1994 (age 31) Guatemala City, Guatemala
- Height: 166 cm (5 ft 5 in)
- Weight: 50 kg (110 lb)

Sport
- Country: Guatemala
- Coached by: Sergio Lopez
- Retired: Active
- Racquet used: Dunlop

Men's singles
- Highest ranking: No. 91 (November 2022)
- Current ranking: No. 91 (November 2022)
- Title: 1
- Tour final: 2
Medal record
Representing Independent Athletes Team
Men's squash
Pan American Games
Silver medal – second place	2023 Santiago	Doubles

Edwin Josué Enríquez Franco (born 9 November 1994 in Guatemala City) is a Guatemalan professional squash player. He has represented Guatemala internationally. As of February 2018, he was ranked number 185 in the world, and number 1 in Guatemala. He won the 2018 Guatemala Open. He achieved his career-high PSA ranking of World No. 91 in November 2022.
