= Leandro Romiglio =

Argentine squash player

Personal information
- Born: February 11, 1991 (age 35) Mar Del Plata, Argentina
- Height: 1.74 m (5 ft 9 in)
- Weight: 68 kg (150 lb)

Sport
- Country: Argentina
- Turned pro: 2009
- Retired: Active
- Racquet used: Tecnifibre

Men's singles
- Highest ranking: No. 30 (September 2024)
- Current ranking: No. 38 (December 2024)
Medal record
Men's squash
Representing Argentina
Pan American Games
Silver medal – second place	2023 Santiago	Team
South American Games
Silver medal – second place	2018 Cochabamba	Team

Leandro Romiglio (born February 11, 1991) is an Argentine professional squash player. He reached a career-high world ranking of World No. 30 in September 2024. Romiglio won the bronze medal at the 2015 Pan American Games.
