= List of squash players =

This is a list of notable top international players of the racquet sport squash.

Names are highlighted in bold if the player has officially been ranked the World No.1; has won the World Open; has been champion at the British Open (which was the effective world championship of the sport prior to the 1970s); has won a singles Gold Medal at the Commonwealth Games; or has been ranked No. 1 on the professional hardball squash circuit.

== Men ==
- Maqsood Ahmed
- Gogi Alauddin
- Ibrahim Amin
- Gordon Anderson
- Laurens Jan Anjema
- **Ramy Ashour**
- Dean Brooker
- Alix du Plessis
- Gamal Awad
- Ahmed Barada
- Abdul Bari
- Peter Barker
- Ben Garner
- Tom Richards
- Adrian Grant
- Joey Barrington
- **Jonah Barrington**
- **F.D. Amr Bey**
- Ritwik Bhattacharya
- Siddharth Suchde
- **Lee Beachill**
- Viktor Berg
- Ken Binns
- Stewart Boswell
- Gawain Briars
- Mark Andrew Burke
- **Don Butcher**
- Nicolas van Caesbroeck
- Mark Cairns
- Clive Caldwell
- Mark Chaloner
- Stuart Davenport
- Byron Davis
- **Jim Dear**
- **Michael Desaulniers**
- **Chris Dittmar**
- **Rodney Eyles**
- **David Evans**
- **Grégory Gaultier**
- Saurav Ghosal
- Stuart Goldstein
- Alex Gough
- Del Harris
- Moussa Helal
- Ralph Howe
- Sam Howe
- **Geoff Hunt**
- Hiddy Jahan
- Aftab Jawaid
- Dan Jenson
- Kenton Jernigan
- Paul Johnson
- **Mahmoud Karim**
- **Azam Khan**
- Aziz Khan
- **Hashim Khan**
- **Jahangir Khan**
- **Jansher Khan**
- Mohibullah Khan
- **Mohibullah "Mo" Khan**
- Rehmat Khan
- **Roshan Khan**
- **Sharif Khan**
- Torsam Khan
- Joe Kneipp
- **Thierry Lincou**
- Khawaja Adil Maqbool
- Peter Marshall
- Brett Martin
- **Rodney Martin**
- Diehl Mateer
- **Manek Mathur**
- **Nick Matthew**
- **Damien Mudge**
- Cam Nancarrow
- **Peter Nicol**
- Victor Niederhoffer
- John Nimick
- **Ross Norman**
- Mike Oddy
- Ong Beng Hee
- **David Palmer**
- Simon Parke
- Paul Price
- **Jonathon Power**
- Rainer Ratinac
- **Charles Read**
- **Anthony Ricketts**
- Gerald Robarts
- Brian L. Roberts
- Chris Robertson
- **Miguel Ángel Rodríguez**
- Simon Rösner
- Craig Rowland
- Henri Salaun
- Mario Sanchez
- **Amr Shabana**
- Richard Sheppard
- **Mohamed El Shorbagy**
- **Marwan El Shorbagy**
- Paul Steel
- **Mark Talbott**
- Alasdair Taylor
- Chris Walker
- Gordon Watson
- Cameron White
- **John White**
- Dean Williams
- **James Willstrop**
- Glen Wilson
- Mo Yasin
- **Qamar Zaman**
- **Ali Farag**
- **Cameron Pilley**
- **Karim Abdel Gawad**

== Women ==
- Angela Smith
- **Vanessa Atkinson**
- Tania Bailey
- Vicky Botwright
- **Cassie Campion**
- **Nour El Sherbini**
- **Nouran Gohar**
- **Vicki Cardwell**
- **Joyce Cave**
- **Nancy Cave**
- Sue Cogswell
- Robyn Cooper
- Joshna Chinappa
- Rebecca Chiu
- Betty Constable
- **Joan Curry**
- **Nicol David**
- **Susan Devoy**
- Danielle Drady
- Jenny Duncalf
- Linda Elriani
- **Cecily Fenwick**
- **Sarah Fitz-Gerald**
- Fiona Geaves
- **Natalie Grainger**
- **Natalie Grinham**
- **Rachael Grinham**
- Suzanne Horner
- Margaret Howe
- **Silvia Huntsman**
- Liz Irving
- **Leilani Joyce**
- Carla Khan
- Shelley Kitchen
- Tamsyn Leevey
- **Martine Le Moignan**
- **Margot Lumb**
- **Sheila Macintosh**
- Rebecca Macree
- **Manuela Manetta**
- **Fran Marshall**
- **Michelle Martin**
- **Heather McKay**
- **Janet Morgan**
- **Sue Newman**
- Claire Nitch
- **Susan Noel**
- **Lisa Opie**
- **Carol Owens**
- Dipika Pallikal
- Madeline Perry
- Deon Saffery
- Lucy Soutter
- **Rhonda Thorne**
- Sue Wright
- **Barbara Wall**
- Heather Wallace
- Alison Waters
- Raneem El Weleily
- Peggy White
- Margaret Zachariah

== See also ==
- Squash
- World Open
- British Open Squash Championships
- World Doubles Squash Championships
- World Team Squash Championships
- Hardball squash
