= Men's US National Champions (squash) =

The Men's National Champions are the National Champions for squash in the United States. These winners are the officially recognized champions by U.S. Squash, the national governing body. From 1907 until 1989, the national championship was contested through hardball squash. When the national governing body began recognizing international softball as the official game in the United States, the national championship also switched to softball. The first softball national championship, also known as the S.L. Green, was conducted in 1990 and was won by Mark Talbott. The S.L. Green, unlike the previous national championship, is limited to U.S. citizens only. The National Hardball Championship would continue past this date, but was no longer recognized as the official Men's National Championship.

== Men's National Champions ==
Name	Year
John A. Miskey	1907
John A. Miskey	1908
William L. Freeland	1909
John A. Miskey	1910
Francis S. White	1911
Constantine Hutchins	1912
Morton L. Newhall	1913
Constantine Hutchins	1914
Stanley W. Pearson	1915
Stanley W. Pearson	1916
Stanley W. Pearson	1917
Charles C. Peabody	1920
Stanley W. Pearson	1921
Stanley W. Pearson	1922
Stanley W. Pearson	1923
Gerald Robarts	1924
W. Palmer Dixon	1925
W. Palmer Dixon	1926
Myles P. Baker	1927
Herbert N. Rawlins, Jr.	1928
J. Lawrence Pool	1929
Herbert N. Rawlins, Jr.	1930
J. Lawrence Pool	1931
Beekman H. Pool	1932
Beekman H. Pool	1933
Neil J. Sullivan	1934
Donald Strachan	1935
Germain G. Glidden	1936
Germain G. Glidden	1937
Germain G. Glidden	1938
Donald Strachan	1939
A. Willing Patterson	1940
Charles M. P. Brinton	1941
Charles M. P. Brinton	1942
Charles M. P. Brinton	1946
Charles M. P. Brinton	1947

Name	Year
Stanley W. Pearson, Jr.	1948
H. Hunter Lott, Jr.	1949
Edward J. Hahn	1950
Edward J. Hahn	1951
Harry B. Conlon, Jr.	1952
Ernest Howard	1953
G. Diehl Mateer, Jr.	1954
Henri R. Salaun	1955
G. Diehl Mateer, Jr.	1956
Henri R. Salaun	1957
Henri R. Salaun	1958
Benjamin H. Heckscher	1959
G. Diehl Mateer, Jr.	1960
Henri R. Salaun	1961
Samuel P. Howe, III	1962
Benjamin H. Heckscher	1963
Ralph E. Howe	1964
Stephen T. Vehslage	1965
Victor Niederhoffer	1966
Samuel P. Howe, III	1967
Colin Adair	1968
Anil Nayar	1969
Anil Nayar	1970
Colin Adair	1971
Victor Niederhoffer	1972
Victor Niederhoffer	1973
Victor Niederhoffer	1974
Victor Niederhoffer	1975
Peter Briggs	1976
Thomas E. Page	1977
Michael Desaulniers	1978
Mario Sanchez	1979
Michael Desaulniers	1980
Mark Alger	1981
John Nimick	1982
Kenton Jernigan	1983

Name	Year
Kenton Jernigan	1984
Kenton Jernigan	1985
Hugh LaBossier	1986
Frank J. Stanley, IV	1987
Scott Dulmage	1988
Rodolfo Rodriquez	1989
Mark Talbott	1990*
Mark Talbott	1991
Kenton Jernigan	1992
Mark Talbott	1993
Anders Wahlstedt	1994
Marty Clark	1995
Mohsen Mir	1996
Marty Clark	1997
Marty Clark	1998
David McNeely	1999
Marty Clark	2000
Damien Walker	2001
Damien Walker	2002
Preston Quick	2003
Preston Quick	2004
Julian Illingworth	2005
Julian Illingworth	2006
Julian Illingworth	2007
Julian Illingworth	2008
Julian Illingworth	2009
Julian Illingworth	2010
Julian Illingworth	2011
Julian Illingworth	2012
Chris Gordon	2013
Julian Illingworth	2014
Todd Harrity	2015
Todd Harrity	2016
Chris Hanson	2017
Chris Hanson	2018
Todd Harrity	2019

Name	Year
Cancelled due to the Coronavirus Pandemic	2020
Cancelled due to the Coronavirus Pandemic	2021
Timothy Brownell	2022
Andrew Douglas (squash player)	2023
Timothy Brownell	2024
Timothy Brownell	2025
Dillon Huang	2026

- Note: The official Men's National Championship (hardball) became the S.L. Green (softball) in 1990.

== Records ==
=== Most Overall Titles ===
Name	Titles
Julian Illingworth	9
Stanley W. Pearson	6
Victor Niederhoffer	5
Charles Brinton	4
Marty Clark	4
Kenton Jernigan	4
Henri Salaun	4
Todd Harrity	3
John Miskey	3
Germain Glidden	3
Timothy Brownell	3
Chris Hanson	2
Preston Quick	2
Damian Walker	2
Colin Adair	2
Michael Desaulniers	2
Anil Nayar	2
Donald Strachan	2
Beekman Pool	2
J. Lawrence Pool	2
W. Palmer Dixon	2
Herbert Rawlins	2
Samuel P. Howe, III	2

=== Most University Alumni Titles ===
Name	Titles
Harvard University	38
Princeton University	13
Yale University	13
University of Pennsylvania	4
Wesleyan University	4
Haverford College	3
McGill University	2
Trinity College (Connecticut)	2
Dartmouth College	2
Amherst College	1
University of Toronto	1
New York University	1

=== Most High School Alumni Titles ===
Name	Titles
Episcopal Academy	13
Lincoln High School (Portland, Oregon)	9
St. Paul's School (New Hampshire)	5
Abraham Lincoln High School (Brooklyn)	5
Deerfield Academy	4
Groton School	4
Haverford School	4
Phillips Exeter	3
Mercersburg Academy	3
Belmont Hill	3
Wheat Ridge High School	2
St. Luke's School (Connecticut)	2
Chestnut Hill Academy	1
Lower Merion High School	1
Middlesex School	1
Choate Rosemary Hall	1
Ostra Real	1
University of Oklahoma High School	1
Packer Collegiate Institute	1
The King's Academy (California)	1

== See also ==
- US Junior Open squash championship
- U.S. Squash
- Women's US National Champions (squash)
