= North American Open =

International professional squash tournament

Details
- Event name: North American Open
- Location: Richmond, Virginia United States
- Venue: Westwood Club
- Website naosquash.com

Men's Winner
- Category: World Series Gold
- Prize money: $115,000
- Most recent champion(s): Ramy Ashour
- Current: North American Open 2013

The North American Open is an annual international professional squash tournament. Started in 1966, this tournament was one of the most prestigious professional squash events behind the British Open and the World Open.

The 2014 North American Open is looking to move to Washington, D.C., and would use George Washington University as the tournament’s backdrop. The 2014 event looks to add a women’s draw to the historic event. Additionally it hopes to provide equal prize money for both men and women, becoming one of two major professional squash events to do so.

== History ==
The North American Open is a key tournament in the history of squash in the United States and was home to many of the sport’s watershed moments.

The 1967 final of the North American Open saw two brothers face off as Sam and Ralph Howe took the court. The match stretched into a five-game battle with the younger brother, Ralph, coming out on top, taking the last game 15–13.

American Victor Niederhoffer captured the classic 1975 final with his four-game victory over the six-time North American Open champions, Sharif Khan. Niederhoffer is the last amateur to have won the North American Open title.

In 1982, Canadian squash sensation Mike Desaulniers topped Sharif Khan in the final securing the North American Open title and the No. 1 ranking on the North American hardball tour, ending Khan’s unprecedented thirteen-year reign at No.1.

The quarterfinal of the 1985 North American Open is arguably one of the best squash matches ever played, as American Tom Page took on the legendary Jahangir Khan at New York City’s Town Hall. Page took an early 2–1 lead against the world’s best squash player, eventually going down in five games.

After switching to a softball format in 1995, the North American Open halted in 1996, ending a thirty-year run of annual play. The tournament was resumed again in 2006 in San Francisco, where it was hosted for two years. The North American Open was then held in Richmond, Virginia from 2009-2013.

== Past Results ==
=== Men's finals (since 2004) ===
Year	Champion	Runner-up	Score in final	City
2013	(Egypt) Ramy Ashour	(England) Nick Matthew	11-7, 11-8, 5-11, 11-7	Richmond
2012	(England) James Willstrop	(Egypt) Ramy Ashour	11-7, 11-8, 11-7	Richmond
2011	(England) Nick Matthew	(Egypt) Ramy Ashour	11-9, 11-5, 8-11, 8-11, 11-6	Richmond
2010	(England) Nick Matthew	(Egypt) Ramy Ashour	11-9, 16-14, 5-4 retired	Richmond
2009	(Egypt) Ramy Ashour	(England) Nick Matthew	11-8, 13-11, 10-12, 5-11, 11-8	Richmond
2008	(England) James Willstrop	(France) Grégory Gaultier	11-6, 6-11, 11-9, 8-11, 11-4	Richmond
2007	(Australia) Anthony Ricketts	(England) Lee Beachill	11-8, 11-7, 12-10	Richmond
2006	(Scotland) John White	(England) Adrian Grant	11-9, 11-6, 11-9	San Francisco
2005	(Pakistan) Shahid Zaman	(England) Bradley Ball	11-5, 5-11, 11-4, 11-9	San Francisco
2004	(South Africa) Rodney Durbach	(Czech Republic) Jan Koukal	15-8, 15-10, 15-11	San Francisco

=== Men's champions (1966–1995) ===
Year	Champion	Runner-up	City
1995	Rodney Eyles		Denver
1994	Marcos Mendez		Detroit
1993	Gary Waite		Detroit
1992	Mark Talbott		Detroit
1991	Mark Talbott		Detroit
1990	John Nimick		Toledo
1989	Mark Talbott		Toledo
1988	John Nimick		Toledo
1987	Edward C.P. Edwards		Toledo
1986	Mark Talbott		Minneapolis
1985	Jahangir Khan		New York
1984	Jahangir Khan	Mark Talbott	New York
1983	Mark Talbott	John Nimick	Cleveland
1982	Michael Desaulniers	Sharif Khan	Cleveland
1981	Sharif Khan	Aziz Khan	Toronto
1980	Sharif Khan	Michael Desaulniers	Salt Lake City
1979	Sharif Khan	Gordon Anderson	New York
1978	Sharif Khan	Clive Caldwell	Toronto
1977	Sharif Khan	Geoff Hunt	Philadelphia
1976	Sharif Khan	Victor Niederhoffer	New York
1975	Victor Niederhoffer	Sharif Khan	Mexico City
1974	Sharif Khan	Rainer Ratinac	Toronto
1973	Sharif Khan	Mo Khan	Pittsburgh
1972	Sharif Khan	Victor Niederhoffer	Louisville
1971	Sharif Khan	Ken Binns	Toronto
1970	Sharif Khan	Mo Khan	Chicago
1969	Sharif Khan	Mo Khan	Cincinnati
1968	Mo Khan	Sharif Khan	Indianapolis
1967	Ralph E. Howe	Sam Howe	Montreal
1966	Mo Khan	Victor Niederhoffer	Detroit

== See also ==
- United States Open (squash)
