= Tournament of Champions (squash) =

Squash tournament

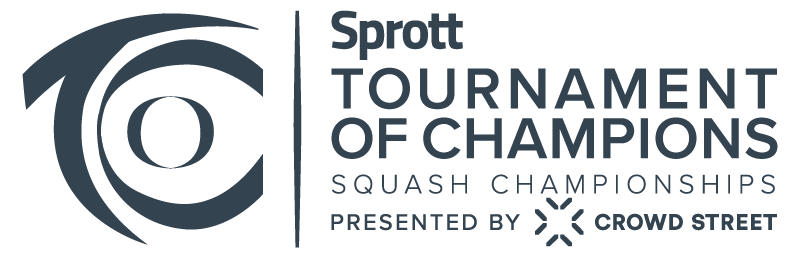

Details
- Event name: Sprott Tournament of Champions presented by Crowd Street
- Location: New York City, United States
- Venue: Grand Central Terminal
- Website tocsquash.com

Men's Winner
- Category: World Series
- Prize money: $239,000
- Most recent champion(s): (Egypt) Mostafa Asal

Women's Winner
- Category: World Series
- Prize money: $239,000
- Most recent champion(s): (Egypt) Hania El Hammamy

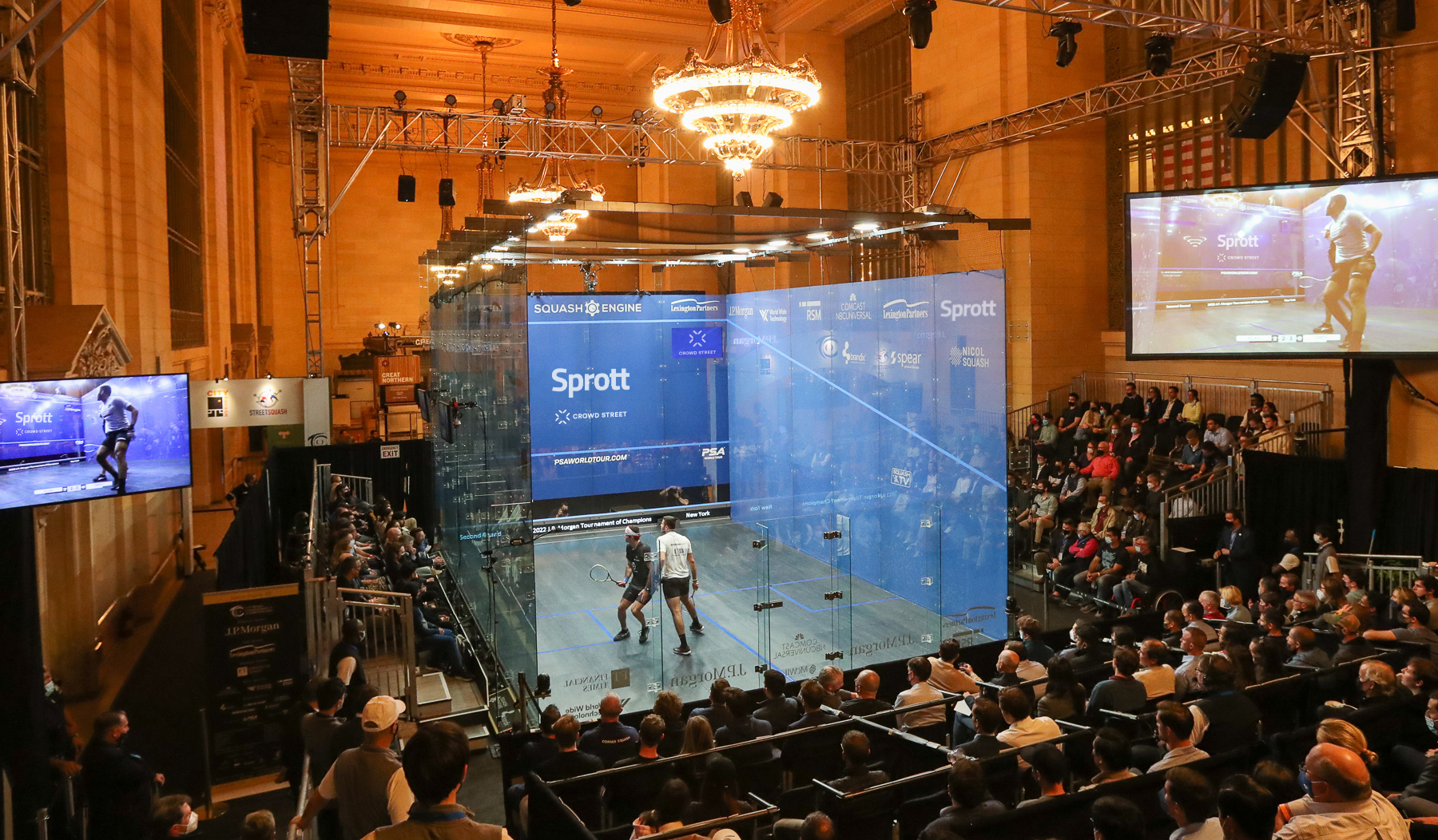

The Tournament of Champions is an annual international squash championship held in New York City. In recent years, the event has been held at Grand Central Terminal, in a specially-constructed four-walled glass court in the Vanderbilt Hall.

The tournament was first held in 1930. It was previously known as the US Professional Championships. The women's competition began in 2001. In 2022, the men's tournament has involved a main draw of 24 players, and the women's tournament has had a main draw of 24. The men's event is now part of the PSA World Series.

== Past results ==
=== Men ===
| Year | Winner | Runner-up | score | Ref |
|---|---|---|---|---|
National Professional Squash Racquets Championship (until 1993)
| 1930 | (United States) Jack Summers | (United States) Eddie Thompson | 17-15, 15-9, 15-10 | |
| 1931 | (United States) Jack Summers | (United States) Ben Pope | | |
| 1932 | (United States) Jack Summers | (United States) Dan Martella | 15-8, 15-8, 15-11 | |
| 1933 | (United States) John Skillman | (United States) George Cummings | 7-15, 15-8, 11-15, 15-14, 15-4 | |
| 1934 | (United States) Jack Summers | (United States) John Skillman | 11-15, 4-15, 18-14, 15-2, ret | |
| 1935 | (United States) John Skillman | | | |
| 1936 | (United States) James J. Tully | (United States) John Skillman | 12-15, 15-9, 17-15, 15-8 | |
| 1937 | (United States) John Skillman | (United States) Ben Pope | 15-11, 10-15, 15-9, 15-5 | |
| 1938 | (United States) Al Ramsey | (United States) Lester Cummings | 15-12, 15-12, 17-15 | |
| 1939 | (United States) Lester Cummings | | | |
| 1940 | (United States) Al Ramsey | | | |
| 1941 | (United States) Lester Cummings | | | |
| 1942 | (United States) Lester Cummings | | | |
| 1943 to 1945 not held due to World War II | | | | |
| 1946 | (United States) Lester Cummings | | | |
| 1947 | (United States) Edward T. Reid | | | |
| 1948 | (United States) Al Ramsey | | | |
| 1949 | (United States) Edward T. Reid | | | |
| 1950 | (United States) Edward T. Reid | (United States) Al Ramsey | | |
| 1951 | (United States) James J. Tully | (United States) Al Ramsey | | |
| 1952 | (United States) Edward T. Reid | | | |
| 1953 | (United States) John Warzycki | (United States) Al Ramsey | | |
| 1954 | (United States) John Warzycki | (United States) Al Chassard | | |
| 1955 | (Pakistan) Hashim Khan | | | |
| 1956 | (United States) Al Chassard | | | |
| 1957 | (Egypt) Mahmoud Karim | | | |
| 1958 | (Egypt) Mahmoud Karim | | | |
| 1959 | (United States) Al Chassard | | | |
| 1960 | (United States) Raymond Widelski | | | |
| 1961 | (United States) Al Chassard | | | |
| 1962 | (United States) Al Chassard | | | |
| 1963 | (Pakistan) Hashim Khan | | | |
| 1964 | (Pakistan) Hashim Khan | (Pakistan) Mo Khan | | |
| 1965 | (Pakistan) Mo Khan | | | |
| 1966 | (Pakistan) Mo Khan | | | |
| 1967 | (Pakistan) Mo Khan | | | |
| 1968 | (Pakistan) Mo Khan | (Pakistan) Sharif Khan | | |
| 1969 | (Pakistan) Mo Khan | (Pakistan) Sharif Khan | | |
| 1970 | (Pakistan) Sharif Khan | (Pakistan) Mo Khan | | |
| 1971 | (Pakistan) Sharif Khan | (Pakistan) Mo Khan | 7-15, 15-8, 12-15, 15-4, 15-11 | |
| 1972 | (Pakistan) Sharif Khan | (Pakistan) Mo Khan | | |
| 1973 | (Pakistan) Sharif Khan | (Australia) Rainer Ratinac | | |
| 1974 | (Pakistan) Sharif Khan | (Australia) Rainer Ratinac | | |
| 1975 | (Pakistan) Sharif Khan | (Pakistan) Mo Khan | | |
| 1976 | (Pakistan) Sharif Khan | (United States) Victor Niederhoffer | | |
| 1977 | (Pakistan) Sharif Khan | (United States) Stuart Goldstein | | |
| 1978 | (United States) Stuart Goldstein | (Australia) Rainer Ratinac | | |
| 1979 | (Pakistan) Sharif Khan | (United States) Stuart Goldstein | | |
| 1980 | (Canada) Clive Caldwell | (Canada) Michael Desaulniers | | |
| 1981 | (Canada) Michael Desaulniers | (Pakistan) Sharif Khan | | |
| 1982 | (Canada) Clive Caldwell | (Canada) Michael Desaulniers | | |
| 1983 | (United States) Mark Talbott | (Canada) Clive Caldwell | | |
| 1984 | (Pakistan) Jahangir Khan | (United States) Mark Talbott | | |
| 1985 | (Pakistan) Jahangir Khan | (United States) Mark Talbott | | |
| 1986 | (Mexico) Mario Sanchez | (Canada) Michael Desaulniers | | |
| 1987 | (United States) Mark Talbott | (United States) John Nimick | 15-9, 11-15, 15-11, 15-6 | |
| 1988 | (United States) Mark Talbott | (United States) Ned Edwards | | |
| 1989 | (United States) Mark Talbott | (United States) Ned Edwards | | |
| 1990 | (United States) Mark Talbott | (Canada) Todd Binns | | |
| 1991 | (United States) Kenton Jernigan | (United States) Ned Edwards | | |
| 1992 | (Pakistan) Jansher Khan | (Australia) Chris Dittmar | | |
Tournament of Champions (from 1993)
| 1993 | (Pakistan) Jansher Khan | (Australia) Chris Dittmar | 15-7, 12-15, 15-4, 15-9 | |
| 1994 | (Australia) Rodney Eyles | (Australia) Brett Martin | 15-5, 15-8, 15-10 | |
| 1995 | (Pakistan) Jansher Khan | (Australia) Rodney Eyles | 15-5, 15-8, 15-10 | |
| 1996 | (Canada) Jonathon Power | (Australia) Craig Rowland | 15-4, 9-15, 15-10, 16-17, 15-9 | |
| 1997–1998 No competition due to renovations of Grand Central Terminal | | | | |
| 1999 | (Canada) Jonathon Power | (Egypt) Ahmed Barada | 15-12, 13-15, 16-17, 15-7, 15-13 | |
| 2000 | (Canada) Jonathon Power | (Scotland) Martin Heath | 12-15, 15-10, 15-11, 15-10 | |
| 2001 | (Scotland) Peter Nicol | (Canada) Jonathon Power | 15-9, 15-12, 13-15, 13-15, 15-11 | |
| 2002 | (Canada) Jonathon Power | (England) Peter Nicol | 15-6, 15-8, 15-10 | |
| 2003 | (England) Peter Nicol | (France) Thierry Lincou | 15-11, 12-15, 15-10, 15-4 | |
| 2004 | (England) Peter Nicol | (Scotland) John White | 15-10, 17-15, 15-12 | |
| 2005 | (Australia) Anthony Ricketts | (France) Thierry Lincou | 12-10, 7-11, 11-9, 6-11, 11-7 | |
| 2006 | (Egypt) Amr Shabana | (England) Nick Matthew | 11-6, 11-9, 11-4 | |
| 2007 | (Egypt) Amr Shabana | (Australia) Anthony Ricketts | 7-11, 11-3, 8-4 (retired) | |
| 2008 | (Egypt) Ramy Ashour | (England) James Willstrop | 11-7, 11-10 (3-1), 11-9 | |
| 2009 | (France) Grégory Gaultier | (England) Nick Matthew | 11-9, 2-11, 11-8, 11-4 | |
| 2010 | (England) James Willstrop | (Egypt) Ramy Ashour | 12-10, 11-5, 9-11, 11-3 | |
| 2011 | (Egypt) Ramy Ashour | (England) Nick Matthew | 11-3, 7-11, 11-9, 11-7 | |
| 2012 | (England) Nick Matthew | (England) James Willstrop | 8-11, 11-9, 11-5, 11-7 | |
| 2013 | (Egypt) Ramy Ashour | (France) Grégory Gaultier | 7-11, 6-11, 12-10, 11-3, 11-1 | |
| 2014 | (Egypt) Amr Shabana | (France) Grégory Gaultier | 11-8, 11-3, 11-4 | |
| 2015 | (Egypt) Mohamed El Shorbagy | (England) Nick Matthew | 5-11, 11-9, 11-8, 12-10 | |
| 2016 | (Egypt) Mohamed El Shorbagy | (England) Nick Matthew | 8-11, 11-6, 11-8, 6-11, 11-6 | |
| 2017 | (Egypt) Karim Abdel Gawad | (France) Grégory Gaultier | 6-11, 11-6, 12-10, 11-6 | |
| 2018 | (Germany) Simon Rösner | (Egypt) Tarek Momen | 11-8, 11-9, 6-11, 11-5 | |
| 2019 | (Egypt) Ali Farag | (Egypt) Mohamed El Shorbagy | 10-12, 6-11, 11-6, 11-3, 11-8 | |
| 2020 | (Egypt) Mohamed El Shorbagy | (Egypt) Tarek Momen | 9-11, 11-7, 11-7, 11-5 | |
| 2021 No competition due to the COVID-19 pandemic | | | | |
| 2022 | (Egypt) Ali Farag | (Peru) Diego Elías | 16-14, 9-11, 11-9, 11-5 | |
| 2023 | (Peru) Diego Elías | (Egypt) Marwan El Shorbagy | 11-2, 11-6, 11-4 | |
| 2024 | (Egypt) Ali Farag | (Peru) Diego Elías | 7-11, 11-6, 11-4, 9-11, 11-5 | |
| 2025 | (Egypt) Ali Farag | (Peru) Diego Elías | 9-11, 12-10, 14-12, 11-1 | |
| 2026 | (Egypt) Mostafa Asal | (New Zealand) Paul Coll | 11-6, 11-1, 11-4 | |

=== Men's champions by country ===
| Champions | | Runner-up | |
|---|---|---|---|
| United States | 34 | United States | 21 |
| Pakistan | 22 | Australia | 9 |
| Egypt | 16 | England | 8 |
| Canada | 7 | Pakistan | 8 |
| England | 4 | Canada | 6 |
| Australia | 2 | Egypt | 6 |
| France | 1 | France | 5 |
| Mexico | 1 | Peru | 3 |
| Germany | 1 | Scotland | 2 |
| Scotland | 1 | New Zealand | 1 |
| Peru | 1 | | |

=== Women ===
| Year | Winner | Runner-up | score | Ref |
|---|---|---|---|---|
| 2001 | (Australia) Sarah Fitz-Gerald | (Netherlands) Vanessa Atkinson | 15-10, 15-10, 15-10 | |
| 2002 | (Australia) Sarah Fitz-Gerald | (New Zealand) Carol Owens | 9-4, 9-0, 9-3 | |
| 2003 | (New Zealand) Carol Owens | (United States) Natalie Grainger | 3-9, 5-9, 9-5, 9-3, 9-3 | |
| 2004 competition not held | | | | |
| 2005 | (Netherlands) Vanessa Atkinson | (England) Linda Elriani | 9-6, 9-5, 9-5 | |
| 2006 | (Netherlands) Vanessa Atkinson | (United States) Natalie Grainger | 9-6, 7-9, 9-3, 9-4 | |
| 2007 | (United States) Natalie Grainger | (Netherlands) Vanessa Atkinson | 9-11, 11-7, 11-5, 11-7 | |
| 2008 | (United States) Natalie Grainger | (New Zealand) Shelley Kitchen | 11-4, 12-10, 8-11,8-11, 11-7 | |
| 2009–2011 competition not held | | | | |
| 2012 | (Netherlands) Natalie Grinham | (India) Dipika Pallikal | 11-4, 11-3, 11-3 | |
| 2013 | (Netherlands) Natalie Grinham | (Australia) Kasey Brown | 11-6, 11-6, 11-5 | |
| 2014 | (Malaysia) Nicol David | (England) Laura Massaro | 11-4, 13-11, 11-8 | |
| 2015 | (Egypt) Raneem El Weleily | (England) Alison Waters | 9-11, 12-10, 11-4, 11-4 | |
| 2016 | (Egypt) Nour El Sherbini | (United States) Amanda Sobhy | 11-4, 9-11, 12-10, 11-8 | |
| 2017 | (France) Camille Serme | (England) Laura Massaro | 13-11, 8-11, 4-11, 11-3, 11-7 | |
| 2018 | (Egypt) Nour El Sherbini | (Egypt) Nour El Tayeb | 2-11, 11-6, 4-11, 11-7, 11-7 | |
| 2019 | (Egypt) Nour El Sherbini | (Egypt) Raneem El Weleily | 11-9, 11-8, 11-8 | |
| 2020 | (France) Camille Serme | (Egypt) Nour El Sherbini | 11-8, 11-6, 11-7 | |
| 2021 No competition due to the COVID-19 pandemic | | | | |
| 2022 | (Egypt) Nouran Gohar | (United States) Amanda Sobhy | 11-7, 11-7, 11-3 | |
| 2023 | (Egypt) Nour El Sherbini | (Egypt) Nouran Gohar | 11-9, 3-1, retired | |
| 2024 | (Egypt) Nour El Sherbini | (Egypt) Nouran Gohar | 9-11, 4-11, 11-5, 11-5, 11-5 | |
| 2025 | (Egypt) Hania El Hammamy | (Egypt) Nouran Gohar | 8-11, 11-8, 3-11, 11-6, 11-8 | |
| 2026 | (Egypt) Hania El Hammamy | (United States) Olivia Weaver | 11-7, 5-11, 11-9, 5-11, 11-9 | |

Note: The women's tournament was inaugurated in 2001

=== Women's champions by country ===
| Champions | | Runner-up | |
|---|---|---|---|
| Egypt | 9 | Egypt | 6 |
| Netherlands | 4 | United States | 5 |
| France | 2 | England | 4 |
| Australia | 2 | Netherlands | 2 |
| United States | 2 | New Zealand | 2 |
| Malaysia | 1 | India | 1 |
| New Zealand | 1 | Australia | 1 |
