= World Squash Doubles Championships =

Squash Doubles Championships

Winners
- Men's: (England) Declan James and James Willstrop
- Women's: (India) Joshna Chinappa and Dipika Pallikal
- Mixed: (India) Dipika Pallikal and Saurav Ghosal

The World Squash Doubles Championship is a squash competition held every two years to deterime the doubles champions of the world. The event is organised by World Squash.

== History ==
The Championship was held in North America from 1981 until 1987 when it was sanctioned by the International Squash Racquets Federation. It was then held bi-ennially from 1994 as the World Hardball Doubles and was held in North America and largely competed for by players from North America. The hardball variation has not been contested since 2017.

Since 1997 there has also been a separate World Doubles Championship using the softball and is held under WSF rules, which require double pairs to be made up of two players from the same country. This event is contested by players from around the world.

== Format ==
The WSF Championships are played on courts measuring 32 feet (9.75 metres) by 25 feet – a court size approved by the World Squash Federation in 1992 for the international doubles game. This court size is the same depth as courts for the singles game, but appears to be slightly wider (singles courts are 21 feet wide).

The World Hardball Doubles Squash Championships (organised by the Squash Doubles Association), was held once every two years for players of the hardball version of doubles squash (which is played with a different type of ball, on courts measuring 45 feet by 25 feet).

== Editions and winners ==
=== WSF World Doubles Squash Championships ===
Year	Men's	Women's	Mixed	Location
1997	England; Chris Walker/Mark Cairns	New Zealand; Leilani Rorani/Philippa Beams	Australia; Liz Irving/Dan Jenson	Hong Kong
2004	Australia; Byron Davis/Cameron White	Australia; Natalie Grinham/Rachael Grinham	Australia; Rachael Grinham/David Palmer	(India) Chennai
2006	Australia; Anthony Ricketts/Stewart Boswell	New Zealand; Shelley Kitchen/Tamsyn Leevey	Australia; Rachael Grinham/Joseph Kneipp	(Australia) Melbourne
2016	Scotland; Alan Clyne/Greg Lobban	New Zealand; Joelle King/Amanda Landers-Murphy	New Zealand; Joelle King/Paul Coll	(Australia) Darwin
2017	Australia; Ryan Cuskelly/Cameron Pilley	New Zealand; Joelle King/Amanda Landers-Murphy	New Zealand; Joelle King/Paul Coll	(England) Manchester
2019	Australia; Ryan Cuskelly/Cameron Pilley	Australia; Donna Lobban/Christine Nunn	Australia; Donna Lobban/Cameron Pilley	(Australia) Carrara
2022	England; Declan James/James Willstrop	India; Joshna Chinappa/Dipika Pallikal	India; Saurav Ghosal/Dipika Pallikal	(Scotland) Glasgow

=== World Hardball Doubles ===
Year	Men's	Women's	Mixed	Location
1981	Mo Khan & Clive Caldwell			(Canada) Toronto
1982	Michael Desaulniers & Maurice Heckscher, II			(Canada) Toronto
1983	Michael Desaulniers & Maurice Heckscher, II			(Canada) Toronto
1986	Todd Binns & Gordon Anderson			(United States) Buffalo
1987	Todd Binns & Thomas E. Page			(United States) Buffalo
1994	Jamie Bentley & Kenton Jernigan	Demer Holleran & Alica McConnell		(Canada) Toronto
1996	Jamie Bentley & Gary Waite	Demer Holleran & Alica McConnell	Demmer Holleran & Keen Butcher	(United States) Philadelphia
1998	Gary Waite & Mark Talbott	Demer Holleran & Alica McConnell	Jessie Chai & Gary Waite	(Canada) Toronto
2000	Jamie Bentley & Willie Hosie	Karen Jerome & Jessie Chai	Jessie Chai & Gary Waite	(United States) Philadelphia
2002	Gary Waite & Damien Mudge	Demer Holleran & Alica McConnell	Jessie Chai & Gary Waite	(Canada) Toronto
2004	Gary Waite & Damien Mudge	Demer Holleran & Alica McConnell	Jessie Chai & Viktor Berg	(United States) Philadelphia
2006	Preston Quick & Chris Deratney	Narelle Krizek & Stephanie Hewitt	Preston Quick & Narelle Krizek	(Canada) Toronto
2009	Ben Gould & Paul Price	Jessica Dimauro & Stephanie Hewitt		(United States) San Francisco
2011	Ben Gould & Damien Mudge	Stephanie Hewitt & Seanna Keating		(Canada) Toronto
2013	Ben Gould & Damien Mudge	Natalie Grainger & Amanda Sobhy	Narelle Krizek & Paul Price	(United States) New York City
2015	John Russell & Clive Leach	Suzie Pierrepont & Carrie Hastings	Stephanie Hewitt & Viktor Berg	(United States) Chicago
2017	John Russell & Clive Leach	Georgina Stoker & Suzie Pierrepont	Natalie Grainger & Chris Callis	(United States) St. Louis
