= United States Open (squash) =

Squash tournament

US Open

Details
- Event name: United States Open
- Location: (United States) Philadelphia, Pennsylvania
- Venue: Arlen Specter US Squash Center
- Website www.usopensquash.com

Men's Winner
- Category: World Series
- Prize money: $241,000
- Most recent champion(s): (New Zealand) Paul Coll

Women's Winner
- Category: World Series
- Prize money: $241,000
- Most recent champion(s): (Egypt) Amina Orfi

The U.S. Open is an annual event that forms part of the World Series for both the Professional Squash Association (PSA) and the Women's Squash Association (WSA), and is organized by US Squash, the national governing body for squash in the United States.

It is the most prestigious squash tournament in the United States, and one of the most significant in the world. Since 2011 the U.S. Open squash championships have been held at Drexel University in Philadelphia, Pennsylvania.

The championship was inaugurated in 1954 as an opportunity for professionals and amateurs to compete against each other. Prior to the mid-1980s, the tournament was held using the hardball squash format (a North American version of squash, which uses a smaller court and a faster-moving ball than the international "softball" version). In 1966, the championship merged with the Canadian Open and became the North American Open. The North American Open continued to use the hardball format and came to establish itself as the most prestigious event in the hardball game. In 1985, the United States Open was reinstituted as a "softball" squash event using the international format. A separate North American Open competition has continued to run as a hardball event.

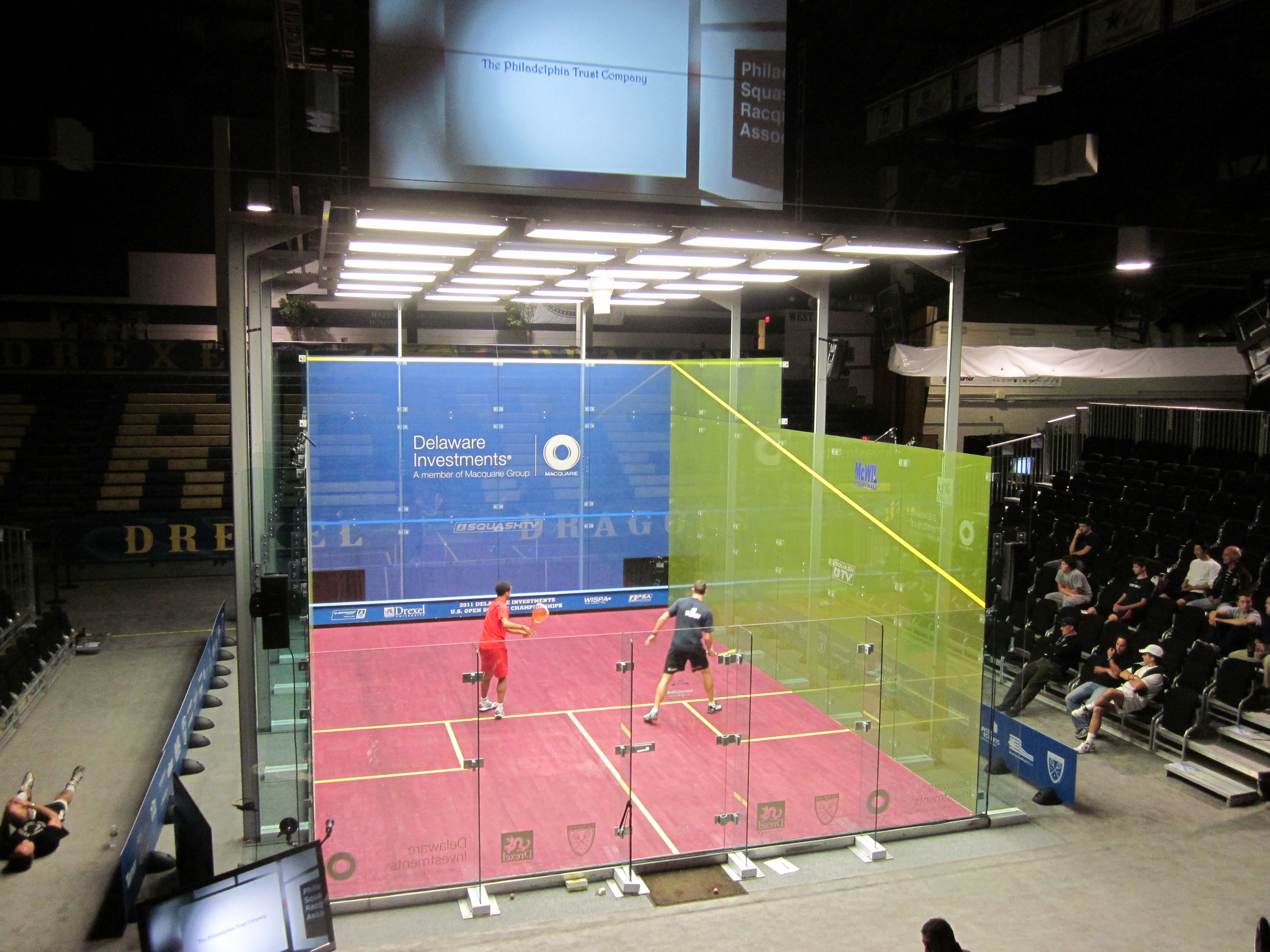
The glass show court used at the 2011 US Open Squash Championships hosted by Drexel University at the Daskalakis Athletic Center

The first championship final in 1954 saw the Boston amateur player Henri Salaun defeat the great Pakistani player Hashim Khan in Hashim's first foray to North America. Subsequently the championship came to be dominated by members of the Khan family for the next three decades. Hashim won the title three times between 1956 and 1963. His son Sharif Khan then captured the title a record 12 times in the 13-year period between 1969 and 1981. Four other members of their extended family also won the championship – Roshan Khan (three titles), Azam Khan (one title), Mo Khan (three titles), and Jahangir Khan (three titles – one hardball and two softball). Sharif's younger brother Aziz Khan also finished runner-up in 1981. Another Khan, Jansher Khan, also won three titles in the 1980s and 1990s. Jansher's last win in 1995 marks the last time that a Pakistani player won the title. In recent years, players from the United Kingdom, Australia and Canada have enjoyed success at the event.

== Men's championship ==
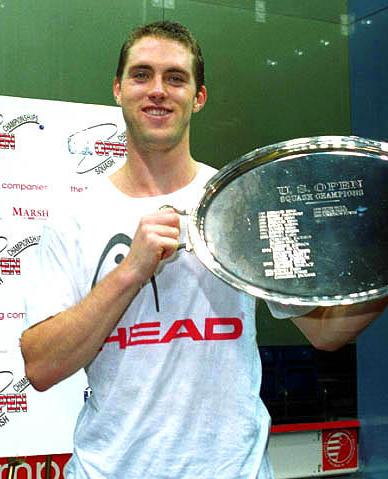
David Palmer holding a plate trophy after winning the 2002 US Open.

=== United States Open Championship (softball, 1985–present) ===
Year	Winner	Runner-up	Score
1985	(Pakistan) Jahangir Khan	(New Zealand) Ross Norman	15-4, 15-5, 15-8
1986	(New Zealand) Stuart Davenport	(New Zealand) Ross Norman	16-17, 5-15, 15-10, 15-10, 15-10
1987	(Pakistan) Jansher Khan	(Australia) Chris Dittmar	15-7, 11-15, 15-1, 15-7
1988	(Pakistan) Jahangir Khan	(Australia) Chris Dittmar	15-11, 15-6, 15-11
1989	(Australia) Rodney Martin	(Pakistan) Jansher Khan	15-9, 1-15, 15-12, 15-12
1990	(Pakistan) Jansher Khan	(Australia) Chris Robertson	13-15, 15-5, 15-7, 15-7
1991	(Australia) Rodney Martin	(Australia) Brett Martin	15-11, 15-11, 13-15, 15-6
1992	No competition		
1993	(Australia) Rodney Eyles	(England) Paul Lord	15-7, 15-11, 7-15, 15-12
1994	(England) Peter Nicol	(England) Chris Walker	15-13, 15-9, 13-15, 12-15, 15-5
1995	(Pakistan) Jansher Khan	(England) Simon Parke	15-11, 17-16, 15-8
1996	(Australia) Rodney Eyles	(England) Peter Nicol	9-15, 17-15, 15-12, 15-17, 15-12
1997	(Canada) Jonathon Power	(England) Simon Parke	15-6, 15-10, 15-9
1998	(England) Peter Nicol	(Canada) Jonathon Power	10-15, 15-12, 15-11, 15-3
1999	(England) Simon Parke	(Canada) Jonathon Power	15-13, 15-7, 8-15, 7-15, 15-13
2000	(Canada) Jonathon Power	(England) Simon Parke	15-3, 11-15, 15-12, 15-12
2001	No competition		
2002	(Australia) David Palmer	(Australia) Stewart Boswell	15-13, 15-10, 15-11
2003	(England) Peter Nicol	(Australia) David Palmer	15-10, 14-15, 15-14, 17-15
2004	(England) Lee Beachill	(England) Peter Nicol	11-8, 11-9, 11-9
2005	(England) Lee Beachill	(Australia) David Palmer	11-7, 9-11, 8-11, 11-1, 11-8
2006	(France) Grégory Gaultier	(Egypt) Amr Shabana	11-5, 7-11, 11-4, 11-9
2007	(England) Nick Matthew	(England) James Willstrop	11-7, 11-4, 11-7
2008	No competition		
2009	(Egypt) Amr Shabana	(Egypt) Ramy Ashour	11-7, 11-2, 7-11, 12-14, 11-8
2010	(Egypt) Wael El Hindi	(Netherlands) Laurens Jan Anjema	11-8, 5-11, 11-7, 11-7
2011	(Egypt) Amr Shabana	(England) Nick Matthew	11-9, 8-11, 11-2, 11-4
2012	(Egypt) Ramy Ashour	(France) Grégory Gaultier	11-4, 11-9, 11-9
2013	(France) Grégory Gaultier	(England) Nick Matthew	11-4, 11-5, 11-5
2014	(Egypt) Mohamed El Shorbagy	(Egypt) Amr Shabana	8-11, 11-9, 11-3, 11-3
2015	(France) Grégory Gaultier	(Egypt) Omar Mosaad	11-6, 11-3, 11-5
2016	(Egypt) Mohamed El Shorbagy	(England) Nick Matthew	10-12, 12-14, 11-1, 11-4, 3-0 (retired)
2017	(Egypt) Ali Farag	(Egypt) Mohamed El Shorbagy	12-10, 11-9, 11-8
2018	(Egypt) Mohamed El Shorbagy	(Germany) Simon Rösner	8–11, 11–8, 6–11, 11–8, 11–4
2019	(Egypt) Ali Farag	(Egypt) Mohamed El Shorbagy	11–4, 11–7, 11–2
2020	No competition due to the Coronavirus Pandemic		
2021	(Egypt) Mostafa Asal	(Egypt) Tarek Momen	5-11, 5-11, 11–9, 12–10, 11–3
2022	(Peru) Diego Elías	(Egypt) Ali Farag	2-0 (retired)
2023	(New Zealand) Paul Coll	(Egypt) Ali Farag	11-7, 11-7, 8-11, 8-11, 12-10
2024	(Egypt) Ali Farag	(Peru) Diego Elías	11-4, 11-8, 11-4
2025	(Egypt) Mostafa Asal	(New Zealand) Paul Coll	11-9, 11-3, 11-3
2026	(New Zealand) Paul Coll	(Peru) Diego Elías	8-11, 11-5, 11-6, 11-8

=== United States Open Championship (hardball, 1954–1965) ===
Year	Winner	Runner-up
1954	(United States) Henri Salaun	(Pakistan) Hashim Khan
1955	(United States) Diehl Mateer	(Pakistan) Azam Khan
1956	(Pakistan) Hashim Khan	(Pakistan) Azam Khan
1957	(Pakistan) Hashim Khan	(Pakistan) Roshan Khan
1958	(Pakistan) Roshan Khan	(United States) Henri Salaun
1959	(United States) Diehl Mateer	(Pakistan) Hashim Khan
1960	(Pakistan) Roshan Khan	(Pakistan) Azam Khan
1961	(Pakistan) Roshan Khan	(Pakistan) Azam Khan
1962	(Pakistan) Azam Khan	(Pakistan) Roshan Khan
1963	(Pakistan) Hashim Khan	(Pakistan) Mo Khan
1964	(Pakistan) Mo Khan	(Pakistan) Hashim Khan
1965	(Pakistan) Mo Khan	(Pakistan) Hashim Khan

=== North American Open Championship (hardball, 1966–1984) ===
Year	Winner	Runner-up
1966	(Pakistan) Mo Khan	(United States) Victor Niederhoffer
1967	(United States) Ralph Howe	(United States) Sam Howe
1968	(Pakistan) Mo Khan	(Pakistan) Sharif Khan
1969	(Pakistan) Sharif Khan	(Pakistan) Mo Khan
1970	(Pakistan) Sharif Khan	(Pakistan) Mo Khan
1971	(Pakistan) Sharif Khan	(Australia) Ken Binns
1972	(Pakistan) Sharif Khan	(United States) Victor Niederhoffer
1973	(Pakistan) Sharif Khan	(Pakistan) Mo Khan
1974	(Pakistan) Sharif Khan	(Australia) Rainer Ratinac
1975	(United States) Victor Niederhoffer	(Pakistan) Sharif Khan
1976	(Pakistan) Sharif Khan	(United States) Victor Niederhoffer
1977	(Pakistan) Sharif Khan	(Australia) Geoff Hunt
1978	(Pakistan) Sharif Khan	(Canada) Clive Caldwell
1979	(Pakistan) Sharif Khan	(Canada) Gordon Anderson
1980	(Pakistan) Sharif Khan	(Canada) Michael Desaulniers
1981	(Pakistan) Sharif Khan	(Pakistan) Aziz Khan
1982	(Canada) Michael Desaulniers	(Pakistan) Sharif Khan
1983	(United States) Mark Talbott	(United States) John Nimick
1984	(Pakistan) Jahangir Khan	(United States) Mark Talbott

=== Men's champions by country ===
Champions		Runner-up	
Pakistan	29	Pakistan	19
Egypt	12	Australia	12
England	7	England	11
Australia	6	Egypt	9
United States	6	United States	7
France	3	Canada	5
Canada	3	Peru	2
New Zealand	2	Netherlands	1
Peru	1	Germany	1
Netherlands	0	France	1
Germany	0	New Zealand	1

== Women's championship ==
Year	Winner	Runner-up	Score
1993	(England) Cassie Jackman	(England) Suzanne Horner	9-5, 9-5, 9-5
1994	(England) Suzanne Horner	(Australia) Vicki Cardwell	9-3, 9-0, 9-2
1995–1996 No competition
1997	(England) Cassie Jackman	(Germany) Sabine Schöne	9-4, 9-4, 9-6
1998	(Australia) Michelle Martin	(Australia) Sarah Fitz-Gerald	4-9, 8-10, 9-3, 9-1, 9-6
1999	(England) Cassie Jackman	(Australia) Michelle Martin	9-4, 9-4, 4-9, 9-3
2000–2001 No competition
2002	(New Zealand) Carol Owens	(England) Tania Bailey	9-7, 9-1, 10-8
2003	(England) Cassie Jackman	(New Zealand) Carol Owens	9-5, 5-9, 4-9, 9-7, 9-5
2004	(United States) Natalie Grainger	(England) Linda Elriani	6-9, 9-4, 9-6, 9-4
2005	(Australia) Natalie Grinham	(England) Vicky Botwright	9-7, 9-10, 9-3, 9-4
2006–2008 No competition
2009	(England) Jenny Duncalf	(England) Alison Waters	11-7, 11-9, 6-11, 11-9
2010	(Netherlands) Vanessa Atkinson	(United States) Amanda Sobhy	11-6, 11-4, 11-8
2011	(England) Laura Massaro	(Australia) Kasey Brown	5-11, 11-5, 11-5, 11-3
2012	(Malaysia) Nicol David	(Egypt) Raneem El Welily	14-12, 8-11, 11-7, 11-7
2013	(Malaysia) Nicol David	(England) Laura Massaro	13-11, 11-13, 7-11, 11-8, 11-5
2014	(Malaysia) Nicol David	(Egypt) Nour El Sherbini	11-5, 12-10, 12-10
2015	(England) Laura Massaro	(Egypt) Nour El Tayeb	11-6, 9-11, 6-11, 11-8, 11-7
2016	(France) Camille Serme	(Egypt) Nour El Sherbini	11-8, 7-11, 12-10, 11-9
2017	(Egypt) Nour El Tayeb	(Egypt) Raneem El Welily	8-11, 11-4, 5-11, 11-7, 11-5
2018	(Egypt) Raneem El Welily	(Egypt) Nour El Sherbini	11–6, 11–9, 11–8
2019	(Egypt) Nouran Gohar	(Egypt) Nour El Tayeb	3-11, 8-11, 14–12, 11–8, 11–7
2020 No competition due to the Coronavirus Pandemic
2021	(Egypt) Nouran Gohar	(Egypt) Hania El Hammamy	9-11, 11-9, 11–7, 11–3
2022	(Egypt) Nouran Gohar	(Egypt) Nour El Sherbini	11-7, 9-11, 11–7, 11–6
2023	(Egypt) Nour El Sherbini	(Egypt) Hania El Hammamy	11-6, 11–6, 11–7
2024	(Egypt) Nouran Gohar	(Egypt) Nour El Sherbini	11-8, 11-9, 10-12, 11-7
2025	(Egypt) Hania El Hammamy	(Egypt) Amina Orfi	11-9, 12-10, 12-10
2026	(Egypt) Amina Orfi	(Egypt) Nouran Gohar	11-7, 11-3, 11-6

=== Women's champions by country ===
Champions		Runner-up	
Egypt	9	Egypt	13
England	8	England	6
Malaysia	3	Australia	5
Australia	3	Germany	1
United States	1	United States	1
France	1	Canada	0
Netherlands	1	Netherlands	0

== See also ==
- North American Open
- U.S. Squash
- US Junior Open squash championship
- British Open Squash
- World Open

== Note ==
^{1} The 2001 United States Open was played in January 2002 as the Memorial Open in honor of those who died in the September 11 2001 attacks. The event was scheduled to take place in September 2001, but was postponed following the attacks.
