= Nimick =

Nimick is a surname. Notable people with the surname include:

- Daniel Nimick (born 2000), English-Canadian soccer player
- John Nimick (born 1958), American squash player and tournament organizer
- William Nimick, Northern Irish ten-pin bowler
- William A. Nimick (1848–1907), American Major League Baseball owner
