= David–Grinham rivalry =

Squash rivalry

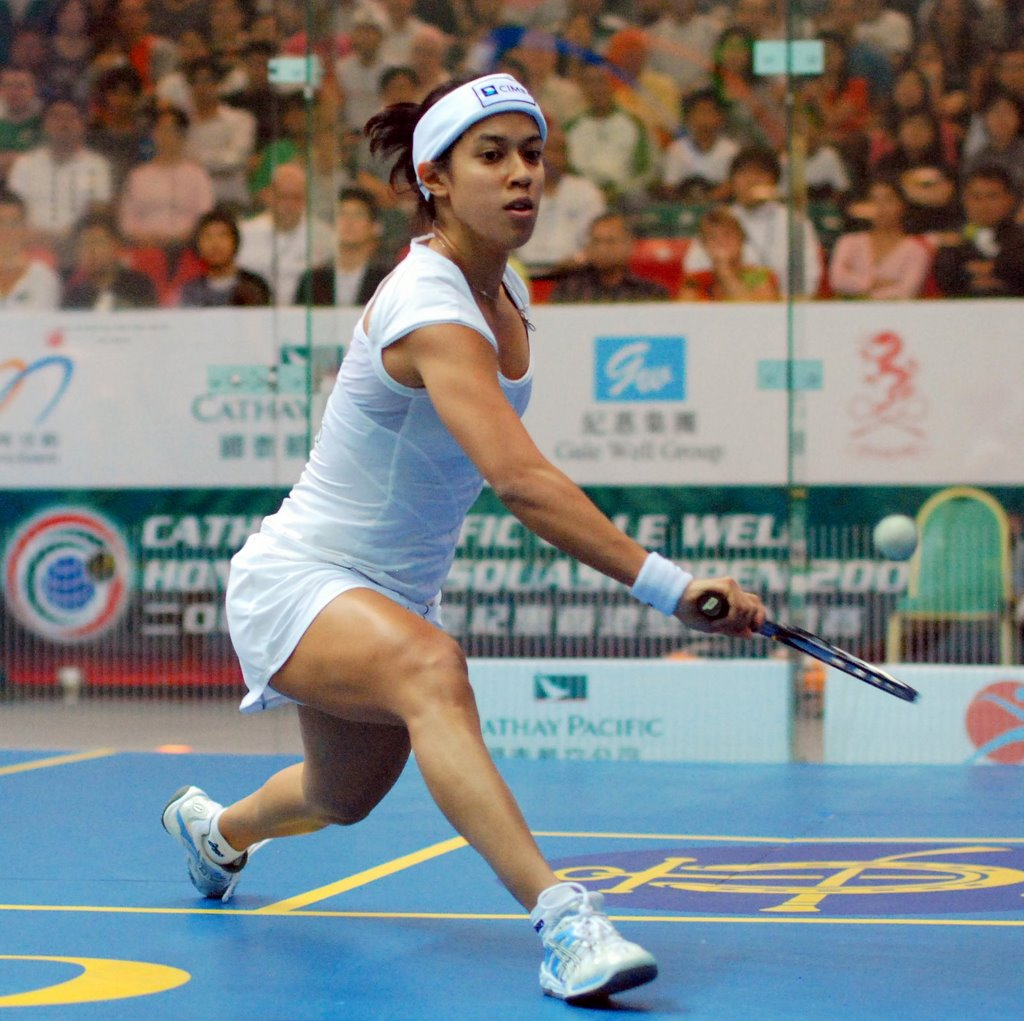
Nicol Ann David in action on the sixth day of the 2009 Hong Kong Open.

The squash players Nicol David (Malaysia) and Natalie Grinham (Netherlands) have a long rivalry. They have met 32 times during their careers, with David leading their overall head-to-head series 25–7. Natalie is David's most frequent opponent on tour. 16 of their matches have been in tournament finals, including two in the World Open tournament. The World Open 2006 final between David and Natalie is dubbed to be one of the greatest in the Women's World Open history.

The longest match between the duo is in the 2007 CIMB Kuala Lumpur Open; which saw David go on to win in a five set match that lasted in 102 minutes. David won 6–9, 9–3, 9–6, 7–9, 9–6. On 27 September 2009, in the $118,000 2009 Women's World Open final, David won the match in four sets 3–11, 11–6, 11–3, 11–8 to become only the third player in the history of the championships to win four titles, alongside Australia's Sarah Fitz-Gerald and New Zealander Susan Devoy.

== List of all matches ==
No.	Date	Tournament, Location	Round	Winner	Score	Length (H:MM)^{[a]}	David	Natalie	WISPA
1.	2000	Finnish Open, Finland	Quarter-final	David	5–9, 7–9, 9–7, 9–2, 10–8	Unknown	1	0	Yes
2.	2000	YTL Open, Malaysia	Quarter-final	David	10–8, 10–8, 5–9, 1–9, 9–7	Unknown	2	0	Yes
3.	2001	KL Open, Malaysia	Quarter-final	Natalie	9–4, 9–5, 9–1	Unknown	2	1	Yes
4.	2001	Macau Open, Macau	Quarter-final	David	7–9, 2–9, 9–7, 9–4, 9–4	Unknown	3	1	Yes
5.	2003	Dutch Open, Netherlands	Semi-final	Natalie	9–7, 3–9, 9–3, 9–7	Unknown	3	2	Yes
6.	2003	Qatar Classic, Qatar	R16	Natalie	9–2, 7–9, 9–0, 9–4	0:50	3	3	Yes
7.	2004	Qatar Classic, Qatar	Quarter-final	Natalie	9–6, 6–9, 9–0, 9–0	0:51	3	4	Yes
8.	2004	World Open, Malaysia	Semi-final	Natalie	9–3, 9–7, 2–9, 9–10, 9–7	1:27	3	5	Yes
9.	2005	British Open, England	Final	David	9–6, 9–7, 9–6	0:55	4	5	Yes
10.	2005	Carol Weymuller Open, United States	Final	David	5–9, 9–6, 9–4, 9–3	1:00	5	5	Yes
11.	2006	KL Open, Malaysia	Semi-final	David	4–9, 3–9, 9–2, 9–2, 10–9	1:03	6	5	Yes
12.	2006	Commonwealth Games, Australia	Semi-final	Natalie	9–10, 9–7, 4–9, 9–6, 9–3	1:25	6	6	No
13.	2006	British Open, England	Semi-final	David	9–3, 9–3, 9–5	0:57	7	6	Yes
14.	2006	World Open, Ireland	Final	David	1–9, 9–7, 3–9, 9–5, 9–2	1:35	8	6	Yes
15.	2007	KL Open, Malaysia	Final	David	6–9, 9–3, 9–6, 7–9, 9–6	1:42	9	6	Yes
16.	2007	Kuwait Open, Kuwait	Final	David	9–6, 10–8, 2–9, 9–1	1:33	10	6	Yes
17.	2007	Qatar Classic, Qatar	Final	David	9–7, 2–9, 9–7, 9–2	1:09	11	6	Yes
18.	2007	Seoul Open, South Korea	Final	Natalie	9–4, 9–4, 9–0	0:43	11	7	Yes
19.	2007	Singapore Masters, Singapore	Final	David	9–6, 9–5, 9–5	0:54	12	7	Yes
20.	2007	Hong Kong Open, Hong Kong	Final	David	9–3, 9–5, 10–8	0:58	13	7	Yes
21.^{[b]}	2008	Apawamis Open, United States	Final	David	9–1, 9–6, 6–6 ret	0:45	14	7	Yes
22.	2008	KL Open, Malaysia	Final	David	9–4, 9–2, 9–2	0:35	15	7	Yes
23.^{[c]}	2008	Malaysian Open, Malaysia	Final	David	11–1, 11–4, 11–6	0:31	16	7	Yes
24.	2008	Dutch Open, Netherlands	Final	David	11–9, 11–9, 11–4	0:55	17	7	Yes
25.	2008	Qatar Classic, Qatar	Final	David	11–7, 11–3, 11–9	0:29	18	7	Yes
26.	2009	Seoul Open, South Korea	Semi-final	David	11–4, 11–6, 11–8	0:36	19	7	Yes
27.	2009	World Games, Taiwan	Final	David	11–6, 11–8, 11–6	0:38	20	7	No
28.	2009	Malaysian Open, Malaysia	Semi-final	David	11–6, 15–13, 12–10	0:46	21	7	Yes
29.	2009	Singapore Masters, Singapore	Final	David	11–9, 11–8, 11–9	0:40	22	7	Yes
30.	2009	World Open, Netherlands	Final	David	3–11, 11–6, 11–3, 11–8	0:51	23	7	Yes
31.	2011	Cayman Islands Open, Cayman Islands	Quarter-final	David	11–4, 8–11, 11–8, 11–4	0:47	24	7	Yes
32.	2011	World Open, Netherlands	Semi-final	David	11–9, 11–4, 11–6	0:44	25	7	Yes

Legend
WISPA Platinum Series
WISPA Gold Series
WISPA Silver Series
WISPA Tour Series
Others

== Notes ==
- ^{a} H represents hour while MM represents minutes.
- ^{b} Natalie Grinham switched allegiance to the Netherlands from March 2008 onwards.
- ^{c} WISPA tournament uses PAR scoring from 21 July 2008 onwards.
