= Paddle game =

Paddle game may refer to:

- Paddle (game controller), a type of joystick
- Paddle ball, a one-person game played with a paddle and an attached ball
- Paddle-ball, a sport played on a court half the size of a tennis court
- Paddle tennis, a game adapted from tennis
- Table tennis racket, a laminated wood paddle used for table tennis
