= Kenneth Binns =

Kenneth Binns may refer to

- Ken Binns (born 1935), Canadian squash player
- Kenneth Binns (librarian) (1882–1969), National Library of Australia director
