= National Art Museum of Sport =

Art museum in Indianapolis, Indiana, US (1968–2017)

- Established: 1968
- Dissolved: 2017
- Location: Indianapolis, Indiana
- Type: Art Museum

The National Art Museum of Sport (NAMOS) was a fine art museum that focused on a sport theme. Sport art captures emotion: the anxiety of competition, the joy of winning, the agony of defeat. It depicts internal conflict: the pitting of honor and sportsmanship versus the desire to win, or the struggle to maintain resolve in the face of overwhelming odds, pain and fatigue. Whether one thinks of the athletic contests portrayed in Greek vase painting and sculpture, the epic hunts that form the subjects of so many great medieval tapestries and manuscript pages, or the elegant horse-racing scenes of Fay Moore and Marilyn Newmark, depicting sport has inspired artists particularly those who want to capture the motion and emotion of sport. In America, a country celebrated for hard work and hard play, sport art has had an especially vigorous history. Many of the most renowned artists- Thomas Eakins, Winslow Homer, and George Bellows-were active sports persons themselves and numbered among their friends leading athletes, fishermen and hunters. For them, as for many others, the multifaceted drama of sport was both a challenge and inspiration, the generating force that led to unforgettable works.

The National Art Museum of Sport had one of the largest collections and exhibition schedules of fine art depicting sport. The museum had more than 1,000 pieces showcasing the heroes and heroines of basketball, boxing, baseball, golf and tennis-over 50 sports. In addition to its collections, the museum also featured extensive archives and a library about sport art and its collection.

The National Art Museum of Sport had a two-pronged mission: to encourage sport artists in their efforts to create sport art, and to collect, preserve, and share through exhibits the best fine art depicting sport that it can acquire. It did this through exhibits, educational materials and outreach programs. In carrying out this mission, NAMOS was a bridge of understanding between two worlds, introducing art to the world of sports and sport to the world of art.

In 2017 the museum collection was acquired by the Children's Museum of Indianapolis and the museum disbanded. The collection is currently on display at the Children's Museum.

== History ==
Founded in 1959 by Germain G. Glidden, an artist and sportsman, the National Art Museum of Sport opened its first location in 1968 at Madison Square Garden. The museum then moved to the University of New Haven in 1979. After exhibiting at the 1987 Pan American Games in Indianapolis, the National Art Museum of Sport subsequently received a grant from Lilly Endowment to relocate to Indianapolis and establish a gallery in the then-new Bank One Tower (now Salesforce Tower), where the museum opened in 1990; It subsequently settled at Indiana University – Purdue University Indianapolis in 1994. The National Art Museum of Sport left IUPUI in 2012 and is in discussions for a new location.

The National Art Museum of Sport hosted over 100 exhibitions around the world including, notably: the 1964 New York World's Fair; multiple Olympiads; Madison Square Garden; the Biennial Exhibit of Sport Art in Madrid; IBM Gallery and the Pan Am Games. Exhibits have featured internationally renowned artists including George Bellows, Thomas Eakins, Winslow Homer, Elaine de Kooning, Morris Rosenfeld, and Andy Warhol, as well as contemporary and emerging artists.

Exhibitions from the permanent collection in the last years have included: "Inuit Games", "Winslow Homer: Leisurely Observations", "Portrait of an Athlete", "Luc-Albert Moreau: Physiologie de La Boxe", and "Drawn to Sport".

The museum's exhibit during Indianapolis' 2012 Super Bowl XLVI was "The Football Invitational".

In May 2012, the museum opened the "Speed & Motion: Racing to the Finish Line" exhibition that featured one of the largest collections of Mina Papatheodorou-Valyraki's work to be exhibited in the US.
