= Wentworth Invitation =

Wentworth Open Tournament Wentworth Invitation
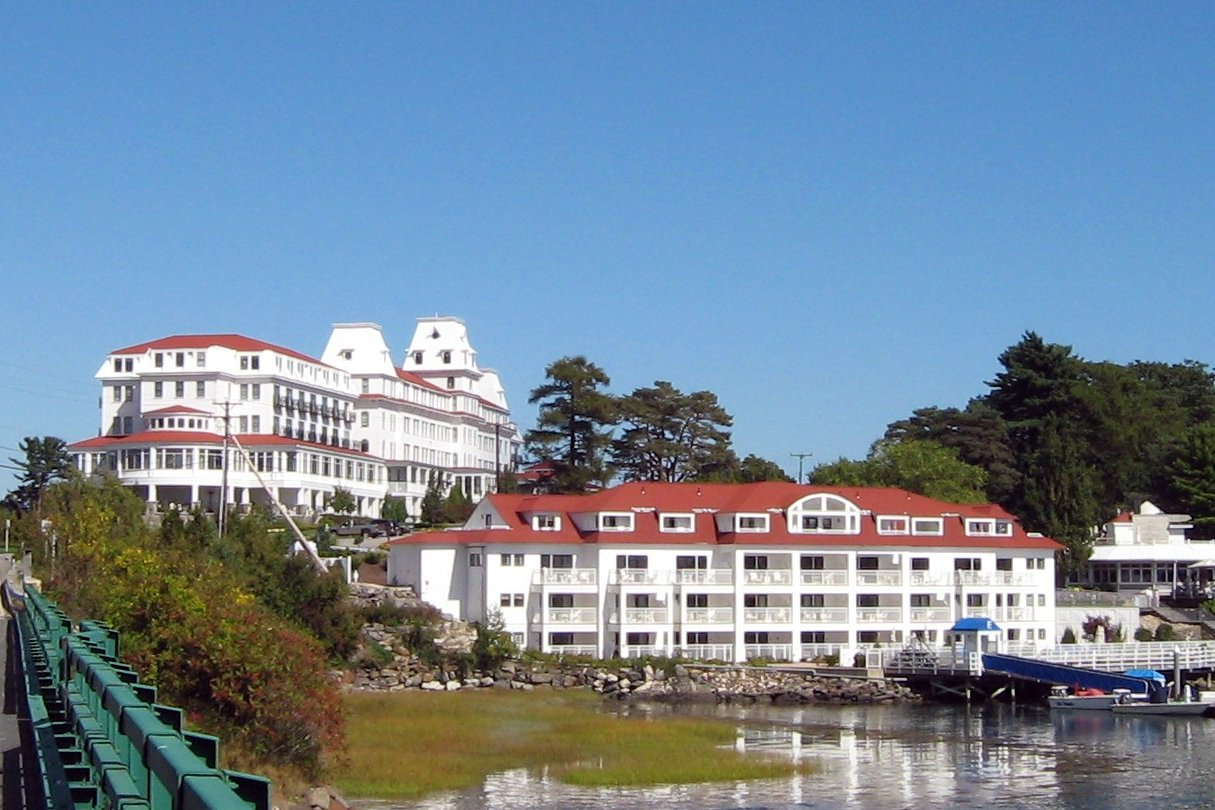

Defunct tennis tournament
- Event name: Wright and Ditson Open Tournament
- Tour: USLTA Circuit (1884–1922); ILTF World Circuit (1923–1970)
- Sponsor: Wright and Ditson (1884-1888)
- Founded: 1884; 141 years ago
- Abolished: 1970; 55 years ago
- Location: Hotel Wentworth, New Castle, New Hampshire, United States
- Venue: Outing Lawn Tennis Club
- Surface: Grass (1884-1893); Clay (1894-1907)

The Wentworth Invitation also known as the Wentworth Open and for sponsorship reasons the Wright and Ditson Open Tournament (1885–1888), was a men's tennis tournament played at the Outing Lawn Tennis Club, Hotel Wentworth, New Castle, New Hampshire, United States, on grass courts and also clay courts.

The first tournament ran from 1884 until 1907, then was abolished. The second tournament was revived in 1953 and ran until 1970.

== History ==
The first edition was played between 30 July and 1 August 1884 on grass courts and continued on this surface until 1893. From 1894 until 1907 the event was played on clay courts. The first tournament attracted notable players including existing and future major champions, and was staged until 1907. The second tournament was revived in 1953, though it did not feature as many prominent players, which ran till 1970.

== Finals ==
=== Men's Singles ===
Incomplete roll

Wentworth Open
Year	Winners	Runners-up	Score
1884	(United States) Howard Augustus Taylor	(United States) Wallace Percy Knapp	8–6, 7–5, 6–8, 6-3.
Wentworth Wight & Ditson Open
1885	(United States) Walter Van Rensselaer Berry	(United States) Howard Augustus Taylor	6–4, 3–6, 6–1, 6–3.
1886	(United States) Joseph Sill Clark	(United States) ?	?
1887	(United States) Henry Warner Slocum	(United States) Philip Shelton Sears	6–4, 6–0, 6–3.
1888	(United States) Charles Amherst Chase	(United States) Oliver Samuel Campbell	6–4, 7–5, 4–6, 4–6, 6–3.
Wentworth Open
1889	(United States) (United States) Charles Amherst Chase (2)	(United States) George Winthrop Lee	4–6, 6–1, 6–3.
1890	(United States) George Winthrop Lee	(United States) Frederick Hovey	5–7, 6–3, 10–8, 7–5.
1891	(United States) Frederick Hovey	(United States) Hugh A. Tallant	4–6, 6–4, 6–0, 62.
1892	(United States) Frederick Hovey (2)	(United States) Henry George Bixby	6–3, 6–4, 6–2.
1893	(United States) Bob Wrenn	(United States) Malcolm Greene Chace	7–5, 6–4, 6–2.
1894	(United States) William Gordon Parker	(United States) Clarence R. Budlong	7–5, 7–5, 7–5.
1895	(United States) Leo Ware	(United States) William Gordon Parker	6–4, 1–6, 7–5.
1896	(United States) Edwin P. Fischer	(United States) Clarence R. Budlong	6–3, 2–6, 6–4.
1897	(United States) George Sheldon	(United States) Edwin P. Fischer	4–6, 6–4, 6–4.
1898	(United States) Edwin P. Fischer (2)	(United States) Harold Humphrey Hackett	6–4, 2–6, 8–6.
1899	(United States) Beals Wright	(United States) Clarence R. Budlong	8–6, 7–5, 6–3.
1900	(United States) Harold Hackett	(United States) Beals Wright	7–5, 7–5, 6–4.
1901	(United States) Clarence Hobart	(United States) Jahial Parmly Paret	4–6, 2–6, 6–4, 6–3, 6–3.
1902	(United States) Harold Hackett (2)	(United States) Clarence Hobart	6–3, 6–3, 6–4.
1903	(United States) Harry F. Allen	(United States) Bill Larned	6–4, 6–4, 6–4.
1904	(United States) Alphonzo Edward Bell	(United States) Wylie Grant	10–8, 7–5 .
1905	(United States) Alphonzo Edward Bell (2)	(Canada) M. Sargent	6–1, 6–1, 6–2.
1906	(United States) Irving Wright	(United States) Karl Behr	6–8, 3–6, 6–0, 6–2, 6–3.
1907	(United States) Arthur Sweetser	(United States) Sydney Lane Beals	6–3, 6–2, 6–4.
Wentworth Invitation
1953	(United States) Tony Vincent	(United States) Henri Salaun	6–0, 6–3, ret.
1954	(United States) Henri Salaun	(United States) Marvin Wachman	6–1, 7–5, 12–10.
1956	(United States) James Farrin	(United States) Henry Van Renssalaer	7–5, 7–5, 6–2.
1958	(United States) Michael Green	(United States) Tony Vincent	2–6, 6–4, 6–2.
1959	(United States) Tom Raleigh	(United States) Tony Vincent	6–2, 6–2 .
1960	(United States) Ned Weld	(United States) William (Billy) P. Power	4–6, 6–4, 2–6, 7–5, 6–3.
1962	(United States) Larry Lewis	(United States) Ned Weld	6–3, 6–2, 9–7.
1963	(United States) Larry Lewis (2)	(United States) Ralph Stuart	1–6, 6–1, 6–2.
1964	(United States) Ned Weld (2)	(United States) Larry Lewis	6–0, 4–6, 6–0, 6–2.
1966	(United States) Donald H. Manchester	(United States) William (Billy) P. Power	2–6, 6–1, 6–3 .
1967	(United States) Bill Tym	(United States) Robert Stock	6–1, 6–3 .
↓ Open era ↓
1970	(United States) Ned Weld (3)	(United States) Jon Buchman	4–6, 6–4, 6–2.
