= Cameron White (squash player) =

Australian squash player (born 1977)

Personal information
- Born: 30 April 1977 (age 49) Melbourne

Sport
- Country: Australia
- Coached by: Roger Flynn
- Racquet used: Manta

Men's Singles
- Highest ranking: 48 (April 2001)
Medal record
Men's squash
Representing Australia
World Doubles Championships
Gold medal – first place	2004 Chennai	Doubles
- Updated on 12 April 2022

Cameron White (born 30 April 1977, in Melbourne, Australia) is a professional squash player from Australia.

In 2004, White won the men's doubles title at the World Doubles Squash Championships, partnering Byron Davis.
