= Paddle ball (sport) =

Racquet sport

Paddle ball is a racquet sport that is played on a court half the size of a tennis court, using specialized paddles. The paddle is made of wood or graphite, and has holes to reduce air friction. The game is played in singles (two players) or in doubles (four players).

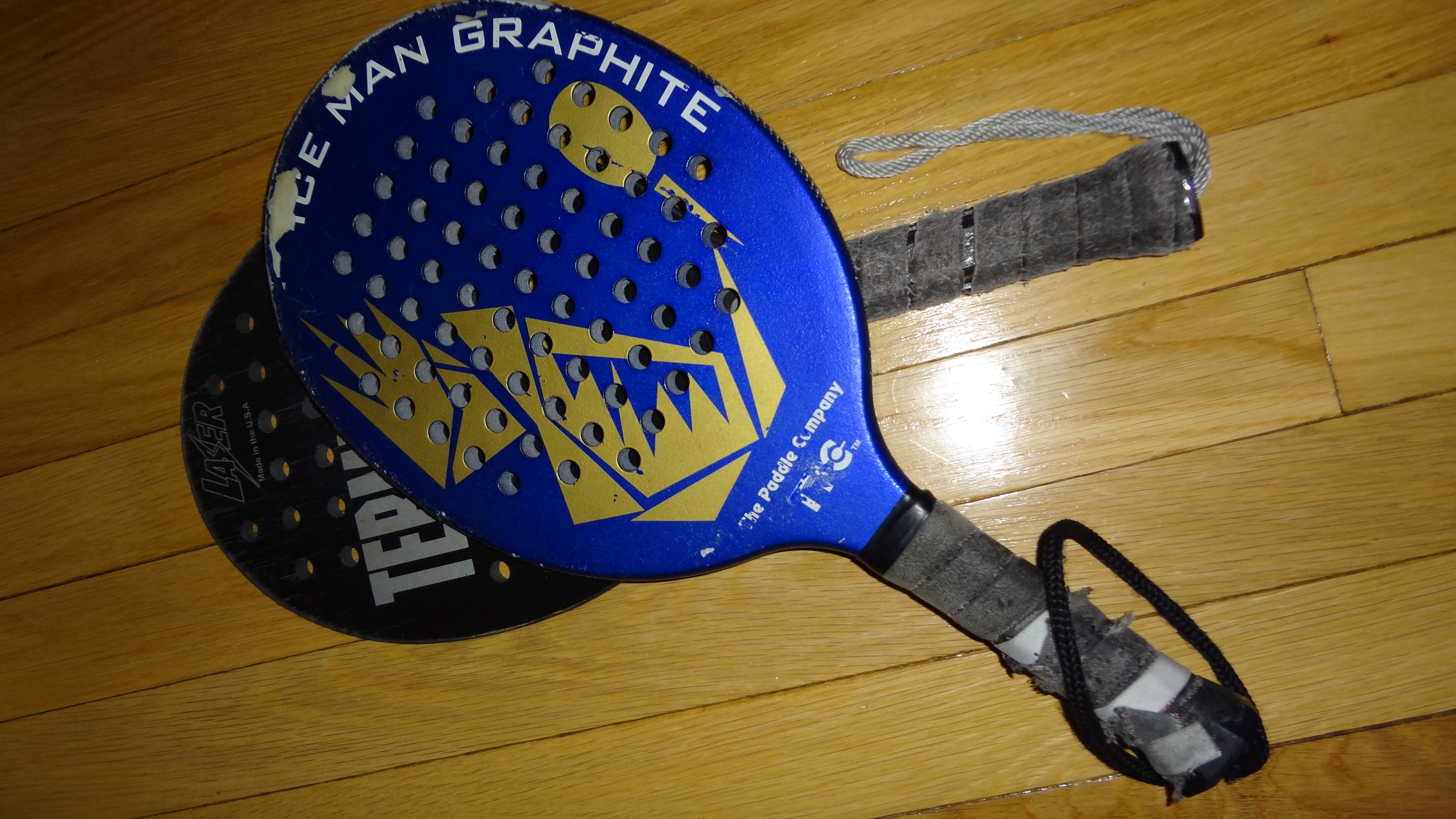
Standard paddles

== Necessary equipment ==
To play paddle ball, it is necessary to have a paddle (resembling a racquetball paddle) that is no longer than 18 inches (46 cm) and no wider than 9.5 inches (24 cm). The paddle ball is made of rubber and is the size of a softball. Air holes in the ball enable less friction in its travel. Paddleballs come in yellow and light green.

== Court ==
Paddle ball is normally played on a court that is 20 feet (6.1 m) wide and 50 feet (15 m) long, with a wall that is 16 feet (4.9 m) in height. The court has a short line, a set of service markers, two side lines and a long line. The service zone is the area between the short line and the service markers. At the start of play, one person must stand inside the service zone and strike the ball against the wall. The server must stay within this service zone until the ball crosses the short line.

== Gameplay and scoring rules ==
During the serve, the ball must cross the short line, and the server must remain in the service box. If the ball bounces before crossing this line, a "short" is called; if it bounces beyond the long line, it is a "long out". If the server steps out of the service zone during the serve, this is termed a "fault". A server has two chances to execute a valid serve, failing which the receiver wins the point and the players swap roles. Scoring follows a progression of 15, 30, and 40 points before a player wins the game.

Once a valid serve is executed, the receiver must return the ball before it bounces twice on the court. The play then continues, with players alternately hitting the ball, avoiding a double bounce or hitting it out of bounds to prevent losing the point. If a ball, deemed to have been on track to hit the wall, strikes the server upon return, the point is restarted. Players switch roles if the receiver wins a point. Interferences such as intentional blocks or safety concerns can prompt a game restart. Deliberate interference by the server results in a point loss.

== Technicalities ==
=== Serving ===
- Stepping on or over the short line, sideline, or service marker is a fault.
- The ball is "short on serve" if it does not carry across the short line before bouncing. This is a fault.
- The ball is "long on serve" if it carries past the long line without being received or bouncing on the court. This is a fault.
- Serving between the legs is an automatic fault.
- The server is allowed one fault per service point. A second fault means the server forfeits the serve. This resets every new service point attempt.
- If any serve is wide, the server forfeits the serve.
- If the server swings and fails to hit the ball, they forfeit the serve.
- If the served ball hits the ground before hitting the wall, the server forfeits the serve.
- The server's partner must remain outside the sideline, in between the service line and the short line, until the served ball crosses the short line.

=== Receiving serve ===
- The receiver must hit the ball before it bounces twice.
- The receiver must wait until the ball crosses the service line before returning the serve.
- The receiver may hit the ball before it bounces.
- If the server crosses their body with a serve, or if the served ball bounces within one foot of the server, a block may be called by the receiver, and the point will be replayed.

=== Game play ===
- If a struck ball hits the striker or partner, they forfeit the point.
- Until the ball is struck or bounces twice, player(s) can swing any number of times.
- After a hit, the ball must hit the wall before it hits the floor.
- The ball may be returned off the wall without bouncing.
- Opponents may not hinder the striker by moving during the striker's swing if they are between the striker and the wall. If they do, the resulting point is forfeited to the striking team. They may move if they are behind the striker and the movement does not impair the striker's ability to return the ball.
- If the striking player lets the ball touch any part of their body, the ball is out against them.
- If the struck ball will hit a wall before bouncing, but hits the opponent first, gameplay is stopped and the point is replayed.
- If the struck ball does not hit wall a before bouncing but hits the opponent, the striker forfeits the point.
- If the striker's paddle contacts the opponent on forward motion, the striker forfeits the point.
- If the striker's paddle contacts the opponent on back-swing, the point is replayed.
- The ball is in play until it bounces twice.
- If a paddle is dropped during play, that player forfeits any resulting point.
- A player can call "safety" out of fear for injuring their opponent with a ball or paddle. Any needless "safety" call is a penalty.
- If the ball breaks, the game is paused and the point is replayed. The ball is played over if it either hits a foreign object or a foreign object enters court.

A referee is not necessary in this game. It can be played with mutual or compromised agreements among the players.

== Additional rules for single play ==
The server can serve anywhere within the service box, and must serve to the major area of the court, which is equivalent to the "service area" on the opposing court side. If the ball lands anywhere outside this area, it is out. Serving from the middle, the server must declare which side of the court they are served into. Serving into a minor area must be declared, or it is a fault.

== See also ==
- Victor Niederhoffer (1943– 2026), two-time U.S. Paddleball Champion
