= Germain Glidden =

American squash player, painter, muralist

Germain Green Glidden (December 5, 1913 – February 11, 1999) was an American national squash champion, painter, muralist, and art teacher. He was the founder of the National Art Museum of Sport in Indianapolis, Indiana.

== Life and career ==
Glidden was born on December 5, 1913, in Binghamton, New York, and was raised in Englewood, New Jersey. He attended both Phillips Exeter Academy and Harvard University. After graduating, he studied at the Art Students League of New York and the Metropolitan Museum of Art.

When World War II erupted, he joined the U.S. Navy as a naval officer, stationed in Hawaii. Following the war, Glidden became a portrait artist. His works were and still are displayed at various national museums, including the National Churchill Library and Center, the Fogg Museum and national halls of fame of baseball, basketball and tennis. The portraits of Ronald Reagan and George H. W. Bush that he painted during his lifetime were later commissioned to be included in the National Art Museum of Sport, of which he was a founder.

During his years as a squash player, Glidden had won the Metropolitan Doubles in 1947 (with John J. Smith) as well as many national titles in intercollegiates (1935-1936), singles (1936-1938) doubles (1952) and veterans (1953 and 1955–1956), retiring undefeated.

He died at the age of 85 in Norwalk Hospital, while residing in Silvermine, Connecticut, and was buried at the Worthington Center Cemetery.
