= Anil Nayar =

Indian squash player

Anil Nayar is a former squash player originally from India. He was the first Indian player to win the Drysdale Cup tournament in London 1965 (then the de facto junior world championship event). He was also a men’s national champion twice in the U.S., in 1969 and 1970, twice in Canada, once in Mexico and eight times in India.

== Early life ==
Nayar learned to play squash at the Cricket Club of India under the tutelage of coach Yusuf Khan, who later emigrated to the U.S. and served as coach and mentored many champion players. Nayar would graduate from Harvard University in 1969, where he played for the Harvard Crimson men's squash team .

== Career ==
After Nayar won the U.S. men’s crown in 1970, the writer Roy Blount Jr. described the Indian’s style of play in a piece he wrote about the match in Sports Illustrated magazine: "Nayar plays Pakistani-Indian style, scrambling helter-skelter all over the court, slapping low-skimming bullets with a racquet held nearly halfway up the handle, returning impossible shots with even less possible shots and, above all, going like crazy all the time."

== Awards and recognition ==
- William J. Bingham Award, Harvard University – 1969
- Arjuna Award – 1969
- U.S. Squash Hall of Fame Inductee
