= Manek Mathur =

Indian squash player

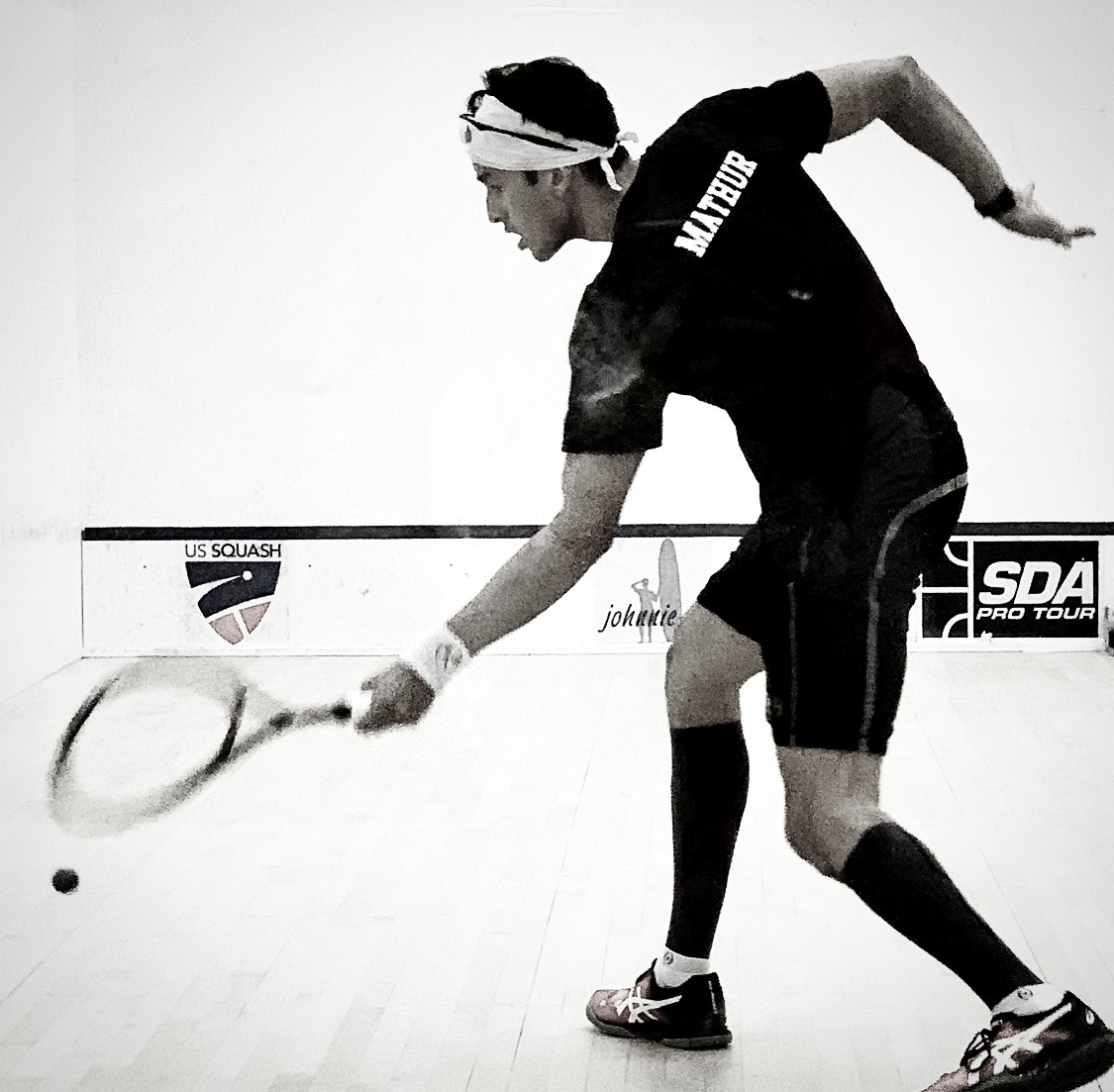
- Born: 6 February 1988 (age 37); Mumbai, India
- Education: Trinity College (Connecticut)
- Occupation: Professional squash player

Manek Mathur (born 6 February 1988) is a professional Indian male doubles squash player originally from Mumbai, currently residing in Brooklyn, New York. He is the head squash professional at the Racquet and Tennis Club. Mathur and his doubles partner Damien Mudge were the number one ranked team in the world as of 2018. Mathur was ranked #1 in men's doubles in the world in 2020.

== Personal life ==
Mathur had his first squash lesson at age 11 but quickly climbed through the ranks of each age division before matriculating at Trinity College (Connecticut) where he was captain of the men's squash team for the Bantams. He contributed to Trinity's historic winning streak under his coach Paul Assaiante.

He is involved in several squash charities and is a member of the StreetSquash Advisory Board.

== Career ==
Following his graduation, he was a professional at The Apawamis Club and worked under Peter Briggs.

In 2018, Mathur and Mudge were the first team in seven years to be undefeated throughout an entire pro-doubles tour season since Mudge and Ben Gould did so in 2010–11; this accomplishment has happened only 5 times in the 18 years since the pro doubles association was created in 2000 Mathur and Mudge were also winners of the 2017 Briggs Cup at Apawamis.

An achilles injury in October 2018 forced Mathur to take a break from playing and focus on recovery. But as of September 2019, Mathur was back on the court with his new partner Chris Callis, the one-time Captain of the Princeton squash team and #1 ranked doubles squash player (as of March 2020). The pair won the Maryland Club Open on 30 September. Other 2019 wins by Mathur and Callis include tournaments at Sleepy Hollow and at Apawamis; the 2019 Briggs Cup win at Apawamis was Mathur's third time clinching this prestigious title.
