= MARHedge =

Newspaper

MARHedge (or Managed Account Reports Hedge) was a semi-monthly financial newsletter and the most prominent publication focusing on the hedge fund industry for most of its history, which circulated between 1994 and 2006. It was originally distributed under the name HEDGE and has also gone under the name Managed Account Reports LLC. The newsletter stopped distribution in November 2006 after the British financial media company Euromoney Institutional Investor acquired MARHedge.

After leaving the magazine, former managing editor Michael Ocrant said that he and the magazine's staff were misled by industry insiders regarding several accounts, including Bernie Madoff's. He was one of the first journalists to try to warn about the returns from Madoff in the MARHedge letter published in May 2001.

The magazine was involved in several large audits of the hedge fund industry, as well as reporting on other major events in the industry, such as the creation of Hedge Funds Care, a charity created with the aim of ending child abuse.

== See also ==
- Madoff investment scandal
