= William Nimick =

Northern Irish ten-pin bowler

William Nimick is a Northern Irish ten-pin bowler. He finished in 19th position of the combined rankings at the 2006 AMF World Cup.

William, otherwise known as "Billy" is based in Belfast, playing leagues at Dundonald International Ice Bowl. He has bowled 11 perfect 300 games during his career.
