= Henri Salaun (sportsman) =

American squash and tennis player

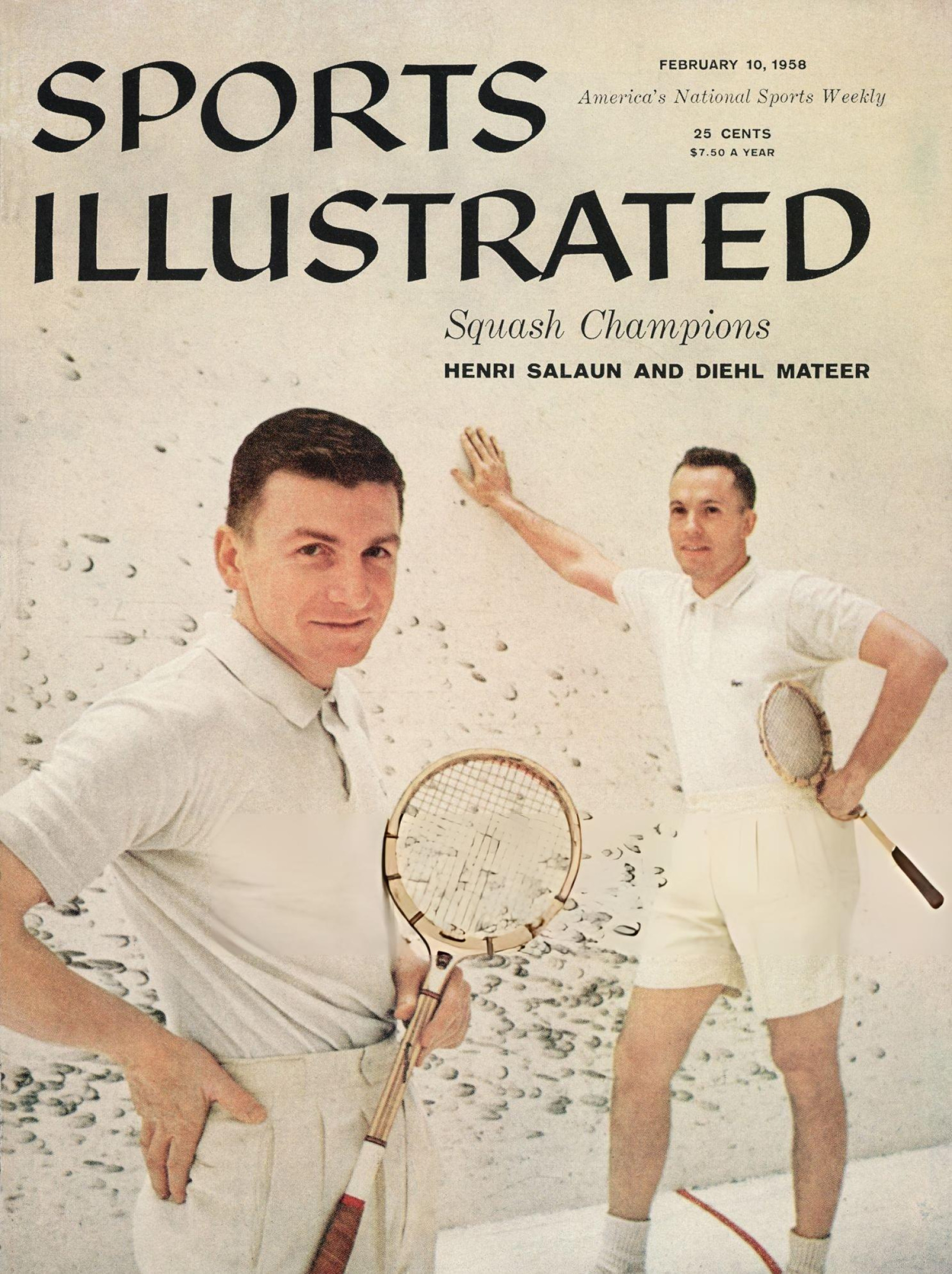

Personal information
- Nationality: American
- Born: April 6, 1926 Brest, France
- Died: 4 June 2014 Needham, Massachusetts, United States

Sport
- Country: United States
- Sport: Squash & Tennis

Henri Salaun
- Full name: Henri Raoul Marie Salaun
- Country (sports): United States
- Born: 6 April 1926 Brest, France
- Died: 4 June 2014 (aged 88) Needham, Massachusetts, United States
- Turned pro: 1950 (amateur tour)
- Retired: 1968

Singles
- Career record: 133–31
- Career titles: 36

Henri Raoul Marie Salaun (6 April 1926 - 4 June 2014) was an American hardball squash and tennis player. He was "widely considered one of the world’s most influential squash players."

== Squash career ==
Born in Brest, France (his paternal grandfather was the French admiral Henri Salaun), he played high school squash at Deerfield Academy before playing college squash at Wesleyan University. He won the United States Squash Racquets Association (USSRA) national championships four times (1955, 1957, 1958 and 1961), and finished runner-up on five further occasions. He also won the inaugural US Open in 1954, beating the legendary player Hashim Khan in the final. Salauan also won "a record six Canadian Nationals (four in a row from 1956-59), a record seven Harry Cowles Invitationals, two Gold Racquets titles and a combined 26 USSRA age-group championships, a total which, like his 39 individual victories in the annual Tri-City (New York, Boston and Philadelphia) Lockett Cup competition, dwarfs that of everybody else." He adorned the cover of Sports Illustrated in 1958.

Salaun made his final appearance at the US national championships in 1966 when, just months shy of his 40th birthday, he reached the semi-finals. Since retiring from the top-level game, he has continued to play in veteran's events, winning numerous veterans titles.

Salaun was inducted into the USSRA Hall of Fame in 2000. He was inducted into Wesleyan University's Hall of Fame in the spring of 2008. Salaun graduated from Wesleyan in 1949. "At Wesleyan, Salaun earned All-American honors in soccer and competed nationally in tennis and squash. He studied languages, and joined the Alpha Delta Phi fraternity on campus."

== Tennis career ==
Salaun played his first tennis tournament in 1950 at the Connecticut State Championships where he reached the final, before losing to Tony Vincent.

In 1951 he won his first singles title at the Northern New England Championships against Clarke Richards. His other career highlights included winning the Massachusetts State Championships five times (1952, 1956, 1959, 1961–1962), the Essex County Invitational five times (1953, 1959, 1963–1964, 1966), the Wentworth Invitation (1954), New England Championships (1956), New Hampshire Championships (1968).

In 1968 he played and won his final singles tournament at the Coral Beach Club Invitation in Hamilton, Bermuda a against John F. Mangan.
