= Damien Mudge =

Australian squash player (born 1976)

Personal information
- Nationality: Australian
- Born: 12 May 1976 (age 49)

Damien Mudge (born 12 May 1976) is an Australian professional male doubles squash player, from Adelaide, South Australia. He holds the all-time record of 157 professional doubles tour titles. Until his recent retirement in August 2019, Mudge had been ranked as the number one player on the professional doubles tour for more than 15 consecutive years.

== Career ==
Mudge started playing squash at the age of 7, turning pro in 1995, at the age of 19. Mudge got to number 48th in the world on the professional singles tour in 1997 and transitioned to playing North American doubles in 1998.

Today, he is the Head Squash Professional at the University Club of New York. He has been working at the University Club since he came to America in 1998, and has been the Head Squash Professional at the private club since 2001.

=== Partners and Tournaments ===
Recognized by the Squash Doubles Association as the "all-time leading scorer" of the sport, Mudge amassed a significant number of tournament wins during his career. Together with three of his partners, consisting of Ben Gould, Viktor Berg, and Gary Waite, Mudge dominated the Johnson tournament held annually in Brooklyn Heights, NY, for over 17 consecutive years. The previous record for the Johnson had been ten wins, not consecutive, by partner Gary Waite.

Mudge has won 15 North American Open titles, 12 titles at the St. Louis Open, 10 Kellner Cup Championships and six Briggs Cups.

Prior to retiring from the circuit following surgery for knee injuries, Mudge and his doubles partner Manek Mathur were the number one ranked team in the world. Mathur and Mudge were also winners of the 2017 Briggs Cup at The Apawamis Club.
