= Stuart Goldstein =

American squash player

Stuart "Stu" Goldstein is an American squash player. He was one of the leading hardball squash players in North America from the mid-1970s through the mid-1980s.

Goldstein was formerly a squash All-American at Stony Brook University. A significant donation from Goldstein to the university enabled the construction of the Goldstein Family Student-Athlete Development Center, which opened in 2006.
