= Rodney Eyles =

Australian squash player

Rodney James Eyles
Personal information
- Born: 15 September 1967 (age 58) Brisbane, Queensland, Australia
- Years active: 16
- Children: Ashley Eyles and Ethan Eyles

Sport
- Country: Australia
- Handedness: Right-Handed
- Retired: November 2000

Men's Singles
- Highest ranking: 2 (November 1995)
- World Open: W (1997)
Medal record
Men's squash
Representing Australia
World Championships
Gold medal – first place	1997 Petaling Jaya	Singles
Silver medal – second place	1996 Lahore	Singles
Bronze medal – third place	1994 Barcelona	Singles
Commonwealth Games
Silver medal – second place	1998 Kuala Lumpur	Doubles
- Updated on 20 December 2011

Rodney James Eyles (born 15 September 1967 in Brisbane) is a former professional squash player from Australia. He is best remembered for winning the World Open title in 1997.

An alumnus of St James College (Brisbane), Eyles joined the professional squash tour as a 16-year-old in May 1984 and was an athlete in the inaugural Australian Institute of Sport Squad from 1985. He was on the PSA World Tour for 16 years and held the position of president from 1996 to 1998. He retired in November 2000 at the age of 33. His career-high world ranking was World No. 2.

The pinnacle of his career was reached in 1997 when he became world champion, defeating Peter Nicol in the final of the 1997 World Open 15-11, 15-12, 15-12.

Rodney was part of the winning Australian team at the 1991 Men's World Team Squash Championships and was also a runner-up in the 1993 Men's World Team Squash Championships.

Eyles attained a wealth of title's including:

Australian Open Champion (1997), Australian Junior Champion, Commonwealth Games Men’s Doubles Silver Medal (1998), US Open Champion (1993 and 1996), French Open Champion, Hong Kong Open Champion, Hungarian Open Champion, Italian Open Champion, Mahindra Open Champion, North American Open Champion, Tournament of Champions, New York (Champion 1994 & Finalist), British Open (Finalist), Qatar Open (Finalist 3 times), Pakistan Open (Finalist)

As a junior player, Eyles was runner-up to Jansher Khan in the final of the 1986 World Junior Squash Championship. Between 1980 and 1986, he won four Australian junior titles and three Queensland junior titles. He was a member of the Australian teams which won the World Team Squash Championships in 1991 and the World Junior Team Championships in 1986. He also won a silver medal for Australia in the men's doubles event at the 1998 Commonwealth Games (partnering Byron Davis). After retiring from the tour, he coached up-and-coming players in Italy, Hong Kong and the US before returning to the Gold Coast and establishing the Rod Eyles Squash Academy to focus on the development of juniors, seniors and professional squash players. In 2009 Rodney managed the Australian Men’s Team in Denmark, was the manager and head coach for the 2010 Australian Boys Junior Squash Team in Ecuador, and the manager of the successful Australian Squash Team at the 2010 Commonwealth Games in Delhi.

Eyles also had two children Ashley Eyles, born March 31, 1999, and Ethan Eyles, born April 17, 2002.

In 2010, Rodney joined the Squash Australia Team as an AIS consultant coach before becoming the national talent development coach in 2011..

From 2010 - 2015, Eyles was the national talent development coach for Squash Australia. This role focused on the identification and development of junior players and education of coaches throughout Australia. During this period Eyles established International competitions with New Zealand, Malaysia and Singapore for young up-and-coming players to experience this type of exposure. He was the manager and head coach of the Australian U21 World Cup Team which traveled to Chennai, India, in 2012 and was also the manager and head coach of the U19 Boys Team at the World Junior Championships in Doha, Qatar. During this event Eyles was a member of the Championship Adjudication and Seeding Selection Panels.

In 2013, Eyles became the head of squash at the Palm Beach Currumbin High School, Sports Excellence Program. This ensured young players continued on the Squash Australia pathway but were educated in a sporting environment. He was also the head coach for the Australian U19 Girls Team at the World Junior Championships in Poland and the Australian Men's Team at the World Men's Championships in France.

Rodney Eyles was the coach of the most successful squash competing country at the Commonwealth Games in Glasgow in 2014, with Australia ending up on the top of the medal tally.

From 2015, Eyles has been coaching on the East Coast of the US and is the current head squash professional at the Greenwich Country Club.

Eyles was inducted into the Australian Squash Hall of Fame in 2008 and the Queensland Squash Hall of Fame in 2005.
