= Aziz Khan (squash player) =

Pakistani squash player

Aziz Khan is a former professional squash player and member of the Khan squash family of Pakistan. He was a top-ten ranked played on the North American hardball squash circuit in the late 1970s and early 1980s and won the 1979 Woodruff-Nee Tournament. In 1981, he was runner-up at the North American Open, losing in the final to his older brother Sharif Khan.

Aziz's father Hashim Khan was the dominant player on the international squash scene in the 1950s, winning the British Open Squash Championships (the then de facto world championship) a total of seven times, from 1951 to 1958.
