= Mario Sánchez (squash player) =

Mexican squash player

Mario Iván Sánchez Oviedo is a squash player from Mexico. He was one of the leading hardball squash players in North America in the late 1970s and 1980s.

He is one of the best players in the history of México and number one seeded in 1983, the only player to beat Jahangir Khan 3–0 and played the longest match in hard ball with Geoff Hunt from Australia in Toronto Ontario Canada at the Mennen Cup it went for 2.15 hours including 11 minutes between matches. He was a seven-time World Champion; Boys 1974 Shady Side Academy Canada and México, Junior 18 and under in 1977, Teams Championships in 1976 and 1977 like racket number one, Amateur Championship in Portland USA and Vancouver Canada and México in 1989. Turn Pro in 1980 and he was seeded number one in 1983 living in New York. Their sponsors Manta made two rackets under his approval in 1982 for Manta Yonnex and in 1987 for Black Knight, Hall of Fame in December 2007. He stopped competing in 1995.
