= Michael Desaulniers =

Canadian squash player

Michael "Mike" Desaulniers is a former World No. 1 hardball squash player from Canada.

Desaulniers played squash for Harvard University, and won the US intercollegiate title in 1977, 1978 and 1980 (he missed the 1979 event because of a broken foot).

Desaulniers is probably best remembered for his win over the legendary player Sharif Khan in the final of the 1982 North American Open (the most prestigious title in hardball squash at the time). Desaulniers' 10-15, 15-12, 15-8, 15–9 win over Khan ended a run of six consecutive titles at the championship for Khan, and marked only the second time that Khan had failed to win the title since 1969. In Khan's previous loss in the tournament, in1975 Victor Niederhoffer, also a Harvard grad, had defeated Khan in the final of the North American Open, the only time that Khan failed to win the title in the 13-year period between 1969 and 1981. After Desaulniers beat him, Khan never won the title again.

A series of injuries kept Desaulniers away from the tour in 1983. He made a successful return in 1984, and then retired from the game in 1986.
