= Victor Niederhoffer =

American hedge fund manager (1943–2026)

- Born: December 10, 1943; New York City, U.S.
- Died: August 4, 2026 (aged 82); Weston, Connecticut, U.S.
- Education: Harvard University (B.A.); University of Chicago (Ph.D.)
- Occupations: Hedge fund manager; author; investor; trader; statistician
- Notable work: The Education of a Speculator (1997); Practical Speculation (2003)
- Height: 6 ft 2 in (188 cm)
- Spouses: Gail Herman (m. 1965; sep. 1981) Susan Cole (m. 1991; sep. 2003)
- Children: 7
- Relatives: Roy Niederhoffer (brother)
- Awards: U.S. Squash Champion; 5x in singles, 2x in doubles; U.S. Paddleball Champion; 2x in singles, 2x in doubles; U.S. Squash Hall of Fame; College Squash Hall of Fame; Harvard Varsity Club Hall of Fame; Jewish Sports Heritage Hall of Fame; Pierre de Coubertin Fair Play Trophy
- Website: DailySpeculations.com

Victor B. Niederhoffer (December 10, 1943 – August 4, 2026) was an American hedge fund manager, eight-time U.S. National Squash Champion (five times in singles) and four-time national paddleball champion (twice in singles), bestselling author, and statistician. Born and raised in Brooklyn, New York, after attending public schools there he graduated with a B.A. in Statistics and Economics from Harvard University, and a Ph.D. in Finance from the University of Chicago Booth School of Business.

His company Niederhoffer Investments returned 35% a year from inception in 1980 through 1996, as he made hundreds of millions of dollars for his clients. Business Week named him the No. 1 commodities and futures manager in the United States, and MAR ranked him the No. 1 hedge fund manager in the world. However, losses during the October 27, 1997, mini-crash forced the company to close its doors.

Niederhoffer came back with two new funds, and in a five-year period beginning in 2001, Niederhoffer's funds returned 50% a year compounded. MarHedge awarded the funds the prize for best performance by a commodity trading advisor (CTA) in the two years 2004 and 2005. However, the funds were caught up in the 2007 subprime mortgage financial crisis, and closed in September 2007.

He won the U.S. National Squash Championship eight times, despite taking a five-year hiatus mid-career to protest anti-semitism in the sport. He also won the U.S. Paddleball Championship four times. Niederhoffer was inducted into the U.S. Squash Hall of Fame, the College Squash Hall of Fame, the Jewish Sports Heritage Hall of Fame, and the Harvard Varsity Club Hall of Fame, and received the Pierre de Coubertin Fair Play Trophy.

== Early life ==
Victor Niederhoffer was born in the Brighton Beach neighborhood, in Brooklyn, New York on December 10, 1943. He grew up there in a lower-middle-class family in a small 750-square-foot apartment, and was Jewish.

At the end of the 1800s, his paternal great-grandparents had moved from Austria to the Lower East Side in Manhattan in New York City. His paternal grandfather Martin (Martie), an accountant and a court interpreter in Yiddish and Spanish, married Birdie (née Kuminsky) in 1916. His maternal grandparents were Sam and Gertrude Eisenberg.

His father, Arthur "Artie" Niederhoffer (1917–1981), attended Brooklyn College from age 16 by playing football to put himself through college and graduated in 1937. He then worked his way through Brooklyn Law School ('39), and finally graduated with a Ph.D. in sociology from New York University in 1963. Not able to find a job as a lawyer when he graduated law school, he served in the New York City Police Department for 21 years, retiring as a lieutenant. He then taught as a professor of sociology at John Jay College of Criminal Justice for 14 years. He also taught at Brooklyn College, New York University, Hofstra University, Queens College, and the New York City Police Academy. He authored several books, primarily on the police and criminology, including Behind the Shield, The Ambivalent Force, The Gang, and The Police Family: From Station House to Ranch House (co-authored with his wife). He was awarded the President's Medal of John Jay College for his achievements. Victor's mother, Elaine (née Eisenberg) Niederhoffer (1925–2006), descended from a long line of rabbis. She graduated with a master's in sociology from Brooklyn College, and was an English teacher, author, and editor.

His brother Roy Niederhoffer is himself a hedge fund manager. He worked for Victor and his hedge fund from 1987 to 1992, trading fixed-income securities, before launching his own hedge fund, R. G. Niederhoffer Capital Management in 1993. Their sister is Diane Niederhoffer Klein.

=== Education ===
Niederhoffer attended P.S. 225 in Brooklyn. His sixth-grade teacher wrote to him: "Although a little trying at times, you were the spark the class needed this year. You have a keen mind; learn to curb your inclinations to demonstrate superiority." He subsequently went to Abraham Lincoln High School in Brooklyn, where he was an A student, a math prodigy, captain of the tennis team, a pianist in the orchestra, a clarinetist in the band, sports editor of the school newspaper, and class president.

He then studied Statistics and Economics at Harvard University, which he attended on scholarship, earning a B.A., magna cum laude, in 1964. Niederhoffer's senior thesis, "Non-Randomness in Stock Prices: A New Model of Price Movements", disagreed with the "random walk hypothesis" in finance, which maintained that the stock market followed a random, haphazard path; he argued that it followed patterns that could be predicted. His thesis advisor was Robert Dorfman.

Niederhoffer followed that by studying in a doctoral program at the University of Chicago Booth School of Business on scholarship, graduating with a Ph.D. in Finance in 1969. His Ph.D. dissertation in December 1969 was entitled "World Events and Stock Prices: A Study of New York Times Headlines and Subsequent Movements in the Standard and Poor's Composite Index." In it, he concluded that during the 1960–68 study period, there was a consistent pattern of stock price movement on the Standard & Poor's Composite Index subsequent to "bad" world events: the day after such an event, the index fell, but on days two through five, the market rose, suggesting a tendency for investors to initially overreact to bad news and then recover.

== Academia ==
Niederhoffer was a finance professor at the University of California, Berkeley from 1967 to 1972. As a college professor, he wrote academic articles about market inefficiencies, and a number of papers on anomalies in stock market behavior. His paper Market Making and Reversal on the Stock Exchange (1966) made Niederhoffer the father of statistical arbitrage and of market microstructure studies. He used innovative methods to search for opportunities in stock markets, such as the one reflected in his paper "The Analysis of World Events and Stock Prices" (1971), which used the font size of newsprint headlines to determine the relative importance of news events and measure how they affected the stock market.

His self-assessment of his performance in the classroom, however, was that he was not a very good teacher. Niederhoffer left academia in 1972 to concentrate fully on his business activities.

== Early career ==
In 1965, while still at college, he co-founded Niederhoffer, Cross and Zeckhauser, Inc., with Frank Cross. It was a boutique investment bank which sold small, privately held family-owned companies to public companies, and it became one of the leading specialists in the U.S. in mergers and acquisitions, representing sellers. Niederhoffer, as CEO and chairman, pioneered a mass marketing approach in investment banking, contacted 200,000 independent companies, and did a large volume of small deals at the firm. He also bought many privately held firms with Dan Grossman, his partner during this period. The firm was later called Niederhoffer Henkel, and was still later merged into CBIZ.

In 1980, influenced by his academic studies on market inefficiencies, he founded a trading firm, NCZ Commodities, Inc. (later known as Niederhoffer Investments, Inc.), and began to trade in commodities, including gold, silver, fixed income, and foreign exchange. He opened an office at East 48th Street and Third Avenue in Midtown Manhattan, while he lived at East 83rd Street and Madison Avenue on the Upper East Side. After he finished work at his office very late at night, he would run the two miles to his home, to keep in shape for squash. He explained the need for elite conditioning, saying: "In squash, you're constantly springing back and forth. Each point is like rushing the net in tennis for a drop shot and racing back to the baseline—10 times for one point."

Niederhoffer predicted daily stock market price changes, based on an analysis of 18 years of stock market statistics. Among others, Monroe Trout, Toby Crabel, and Victor's brother Roy Niederhoffer all traded at the firm.

Niederhoffer's success attracted the attention of investor George Soros. Niederhoffer became a partner of Soros, and managed all of his fixed income and foreign exchange from 1981 to 1993. For a decade, the two of them spoke 50 times a day. Soros wrote in The Alchemy of Finance that Niederhoffer was the only one of his managers who had retired voluntarily from trading for him while still ahead. Soros held Niederhoffer in such high esteem that he sent his son to work for him, to learn how to trade.

== Niederhoffer Investments hedge fund; high returns ==
Niederhoffer Investments returned 35% a year from inception in 1980 through 1996. Finance author Barry Ritholtz wrote that "This has been regarded as one of the best trading records of all time." From the early 1960s through the mid–1990s he made hundreds of millions of dollars for his clients. In 1994, Business Week named him the No. 1 commodities and futures manager in the United States. In 1996, MAR ranked him the No. 1 hedge fund manager in the world. Barron's called him one of the most prominent hedge fund managers in the U.S.

=== 1997 losses ===
In the spring of 1997, Niederhoffer Investments was not finding many opportunities for investments and, having returned much of its funds to customers such as George Soros, began investing several hundred million dollars in areas in which Niederhoffer later admitted that he did not have much expertise, borrowing on margin against his assets to fund his purchases. Niederhoffer decided to sell put options on Thai bank stocks to collect premium – the price of the option – (being effectively long these stocks), which had fallen heavily in the 1997 Asian financial crisis, his bet being that the Thai government would not allow these companies to go out of business. However, as the Thai currency crashed, and on October 27, 1997, losses resulting from this investment, combined with a 554-point (7.2%) single-day decline in the Dow Jones Industrial Average (the eighth-largest point decline to date in index history), forced Niederhoffer Investments to close its doors.

In a lawsuit that Niederhoffer later filed on behalf of his customers in the U.S. District Court for the Northern District of Illinois against the Chicago Mercantile Exchange futures market, where he traded options, he alleged that floor traders colluded by marking options against him at much higher than market prices to drive the market down that day to force him out of his positions. The exchange settled the litigation with him, and Niederhoffer distributed the entire amount of the settlement to his clients without deducting any money to pay for the significant legal fees he had incurred. Traders at the time said his broker Refco may have been responsible for as much as $35 million of Niederhoffer's losses.

He lost his $130 million fund, as well as the majority of his own savings. The losses led him to sell his collection of antique silver (known as the second-best collection of American silver, after that of the Metropolitan Museum), some of his trophies and rare books, and to take out a mortgage on his 20,000-square-foot neo-Tudor home in Weston, Connecticut which he had built in 1982. Depressed, lost, and not knowing what to do with himself, he retreated into re-reading novels. He toyed with electronics, inventing an electronic remote-controlled device that raised up and lowered his toilet seat. Niederhoffer joked: "It would have saved a lot of marriages."

== Matador Fund; new hedge fund ==
After closing down Niederhoffer Investments in 1997, Niederhoffer began trading for his own account again in 1998. This original fund was called Wimbledon Fund, the name reflecting his love of tennis. He began managing money for offshore institutional investor clients in February 2002, with $2 million in the offshore Matador Fund. Niederhoffer employed proprietary computer programs that purported to predict short-term moves using multivariate time series analysis. He traded in short-term movements in the S&P 500, buying and selling futures and options contracts on the index up to two dozen times a day, and holding onto each position for one to five days. He purchased the contracts on margin, or with borrowed money. As the hedge fund started bringing in top returns, he opened a second hedge fund, this one open to U.S. investors, named Manchester Partners.

In a five-year period beginning in 2001, Niederhoffer's fund returned 50% a year compounded. His worst year in this period was 2004, returning 40%. In 2005, by which time he had grown the fund from $2 million to $346 million, he returned 56.2%. On April 6, 2006, the industry group MarHedge awarded Matador Fund Ltd. and Manchester Trading, two funds managed by Niederhoffer, the prize for best performance by a commodity trading advisor (CTA) in the two years 2004 and 2005. A perfectionist, despite his years of successful trading he always reflected on what he could have done better; he said in a 2007 interview that in his 28 years as a professional investor he had not had a single truly satisfactory trading day.

However, Niederhoffer's funds were caught up in the 2007 subprime mortgage financial crisis, and the Matador Fund was closed in September 2007 after a decline in value of more than 75% percent.

== Squash and other racket sports ==
Niederhoffer spent his early years excelling in wall sports such as handball, paddleball, paddle tennis, and tennis at the beach and sports complex Brighton Beach Baths, three blocks from his home. His early background competing in Brooklyn in these high-speed court sports heavily influenced his elite hand speed and hyper-aggressive reflexes, which he marshaled in later years in squash and racquetball.

His college roommate Jim Wynne said: "Vic was always aware that he grew up in a poor section of Brooklyn, the other side of the tracks, and that he was Jewish. He always had something to prove. He would chew on glass to win."

=== Tennis ===
As a teenager Niederhoffer played tennis, and won a series of tennis championships in the New York City metropolitan area. He won the 1956 Metropolitan Tennis Doubles Championship for boys under 13 years of age, the 1958 Long Island Tennis U–15 Singles Championship, the 1958 Metropolitan Tennis U–15 Doubles Championship, the 1957 and 1959 PSAL Singles Tennis Championships, the 1959 Brooklyn Junior Singles Tennis Championship, the 1961 Brooklyn Chamber of Commerce Tennis Junior Singles Championship.

=== Squash ===
"The difference between winning and losing generally hangs on a small thread. Most of my best wins were determined by that little "extra effort" that I put in during the game, or shortly before. Many times the "little extra" involved diving to retrieve a shot. Other times it came weeks before as I sprinted two miles up Madison Avenue at midnight to get in shape. If you are ready to give it all it takes and then a little more, you have the potential for greatness."

— Victor Niederhoffer

Niederhoffer was subsequently a multi-time U.S. National Squash Champion, and is a member of the U.S. Squash Hall of Fame and the College Squash Hall of Fame. Niederhoffer had never played squash when he entered Harvard University in 1960, though he had played other racquet sports. His coach at Harvard, Jack Barnaby, said "Early in his freshman year, before I ever met Vic, I learned that he was going around school saying that he intended to be the national squash champion. At that point Vic had never set foot on a squash court."

One year later, despite being unseeded, the 18-year-old Niederhoffer won the U.S. National Junior Championship early in his sophomore year. His Harvard coach, describing him as one of the most competitive characters he had ever seen, said: "you feel like you are watching a person of Ty Cobb's cut in action again." He also later recalled: "I finally reached the conclusion that he was one of the few people who deserved to be called a genius. He could think under pressure better than any player I've ever seen." In 1964, during his senior year, he won the National Intercollegiate Individual squash championship. He played No. 1 for Harvard Crimson men's squash during his college career, was named First Team All-American each year, and each year Harvard won the Ivy League title. In 1965, he then won every major amateur tournament.

Niederhoffer won the U.S. Nationals five times, in 1966, 1972, 1973, 1974, and 1975 (a record exceeded only by Stanley Pearson, who won his sixth in 1923), and was the first player to win the championship four years in a row. Asked prior to the 1975 nationals who his greatest threat was going to be, the four-time national champion responded: "Niederhoffer. I've got to be careful not to be arrogant." When he won the championship that year, it was without dropping even one game, a feat he had also performed in his comeback-nationals in 1972. He also won three national doubles titles, in 1968, 1973, and 1974.

While he was the 1966 national champion, when he was living in Chicago, Niederhoffer was denied membership in each of the five private clubs of the largely WASP squash establishment. One of the clubs was to be the site for the upcoming 1967 U.S. championship. One club told him directly that: "it would be extremely difficult for a Jew to become a member". Deeply offended, and believing that the slight was a product of antisemitism, he left the sport for the next five years, boycotting it with the exception of the 1968 national doubles tournament which he won. He said: "I recognize a private club's right to refuse me membership, but the fact that the national tournament was being held in this kind of closed environment is typical of the short-sighted, elitist attitudes of the ruling body." He later said: "There is a natural tendency among the aristocratic ruling powers of squash to keep it a closed fraternity where women and children aren't welcome, where Jews and unwealthy men aren't welcome. What I've always stood for is the opposite of this, the opening up of the game."

Finally, in 1972, saying that he had made his point about prejudice at squash clubs, he returned to playing squash, and won the national championship. Niederhoffer won an unprecedented series of four national squash singles championships in a row.

"The way I play, it's more like torture. The way I play, it's not that enjoyable playing squash. I like the stimulation and recognition, the achievement."

— Victor Niederhoffer

In 1975, Niederhoffer defeated one of the greatest players in the history of the game, Sharif Khan, in Mexico City in the final of the North American Open, viewed as the Wimbledon of hardball squash (the only time that Khan failed to win the title in the 13-year period between 1969 and 1981). In the 1974-75 season, he won every major singles tournament, winning 60 matches and not losing any. He beat Khan again the following year in the new Uptown Racquet Club in Manhattan.

In 1976, Niederhoffer received the Pierre de Coubertin Fair Play Trophy at the UNESCO headquarters in Paris, France. In 1988, he was inducted into the Harvard Varsity Club Hall of Fame, and in 2018 into the Jewish Sports Heritage Hall of Fame.

As to his approach to shot-making, he said that "[I] employ the concept that all shots should have high rewards in relation to risks.” The New York Times called him "the finest shotmaker in the game." At one stretch, he practiced or competed on 3,500 consecutive days without a break. Niederhoffer attributed his success to persistence, organization, and businesslike habits, while saying that there were hundreds of squash players who were stronger, faster, and more flexible than he was.

=== Paddleball ===
In 1965 and 1966, Niederhoffer won the singles championship in the annual U.S. Paddleball Championship. In 1964 and 1965, he won the national paddleball doubles title.

=== Racquetball ===
Not having ever played racquetball before as of February 1975, two months later Niederhoffer competed n the 1975 U.S. Racquetball National Championships. He was a quarter-finalist. In his short racquetball career, he had a winning career record against multi-time world champion Marty Hogan (racquetball). He retired from competitive racquetball the following year, citing his age (32) and the fact that there were few players and courts on a good deal of the East Coast.

== Writing ==
In 1997, Niederhoffer published a New York Times bestselling memoir, The Education of a Speculator; The New York Times described it as "An instructional autobiography by the colorful commodities trader.". George Soros praised it for his "original mind and eclectic approach.” In the book, Niederhoffer wrote:

In statistical terms, I figure I have traded about 2 million contracts, with an average profit of $70 per contract (after slippage of perhaps $20). This average is approximately 700 standard deviations away from randomness.

He also had some advice for those who came to his book looking for investing secrets:

It is inconceivable that anyone will divulge a truly effective get-rich scheme for the price of a book. There is ample opportunity to use wealth in this world, and neither I nor my friends, nor anyone else I have ever met, has so much of it that they are interested in putting themselves at a disadvantage by sharing their secrets.

From 2000 to 2003, Niederhoffer co-wrote a weekly column on the stock markets with financial writer Laurel Kenner for CNBC MoneyCentral. He and Kenner co-wrote Practical Speculation (John Wiley & Sons, February 2003).

== Other activities ==
Niederhoffer was an economic libertarian, who believed strongly in personal freedom and the creative power of business, the free enterprise system, and capitalism. He founded the NYC Junto, a libertarian group that he hosted on the first Thursday of every month from 1985 to 2017, and at which he encouraged each attendee to speak. He was an enthusiast of Ayn Rand, and named two of his daughters Galt and Rand. The NYC Junto focused on libertarianism, Objectivism, and investing and was inspired by the Junto hosted by Benjamin Franklin in Philadelphia from 1727 to 1757. He had six daughters and one son.

Niederhoffer was a collector of letters, 15,000 books, and 2,500 paintings. He wrote: "Books and letters have always been an important part of my family life. My father was a policeman in the book publishing area of east New York. In those days, they didn’t sell their overstock - they dumped them in the East River. They hired policemen to do the unloading. My father was paid 50 cents an hour to dump them in the river; instead, he saved them. Our house of about 750 feet, plus wife and two children, had his book collection. The whole house and basement were lined with books.”

== Eccentricities ==
Niederhoffer had a unique personality. He would attend stuffy formal squash establishment dinners in a tuxedo, but wearing a pair of mismatched-by-color, brand, and design tennis sneakers, such as one blue and one green and at times one low-top and one high-top, which is how he would also usually wear his sneakers on the squash court. Squash historian Rob Dinerman said "That was sort of his way of saying: I'm not like you and I'm going to beat you anyway." He was known for wearing clothing in bright pastel-only yellow, orange, pink, blue, and other colors. He had a "socks, no shoes" policy in his office, to reduce noise, and did not allow air conditioning in his office. He would also browse bookstores in his socks.

He did not own a television or watch tv, and did not like to read books less than 100 years old. At the same time, Niederhoffer maintained that the only periodical he read was the tabloid newspaper The National Enquirer. While teaching finance at the University of California, Berkeley, he kept a pet monkey. At dinner, he would eat his dessert first.

== In popular culture ==
Niederhoffer's early career, eccentricities, and trading methods were satirized in the 1998 biographical comic strip Titans of Finance: Hoodoo, written by Rob Walker and illustrated by Josh Neufeld. The comic originally appeared in the alternative comic book Keyhole #6, before it was compiled into the anthology book Titans of Finance: True Tales of Money and Business.

== Death ==
Niederhoffer died of natural causes on August 4, 2026, at the age of 82, at his home in Weston, Connecticut. He was survived by his wife, Susan (née Cole; they married in 1991 and had four daughters, separated in 2003, and later reconciled), his former wife, Gail (née Herman; they had two daughters, and separated in 1981), his six daughters, Galt (named after the polymath Francis Galton), Katie, Rand, Victoria, Artemis, and Kira, his son Aubrey, 15 grandchildren, his sister, Diane Niederhoffer Klein, and his brother, Roy Niederhoffer.

== Bibliography ==
- Niederhoffer, Victor (1997). The Education of a Speculator. New York: John Wiley & Sons. ISBN 0-471-24948-3.
- Niederhoffer, Victor; Kenner, Laurel (2003). Practical Speculation. New York: John Wiley & Sons. ISBN 0-471-67774-4.
- Niederhoffer contributed a foreword to a 2006 edition of Fifty Years in Wall Street (1887), by financier and author Henry Clews.
