= Gordon Anderson (squash player) =

Canadian former squash player (born 20th century)

Gordon Anderson (born 1948-1949) is a former squash player from Canada.

== Career ==
He was one of the leading hardball squash players in North America in the 1970s.

Anderson won the Canadian national squash title three consecutive times – in 1973, 1974, and 1975. He was runner-up at the North American Open in 1979. In 2013, Anderson was inducted into the Ontario Squash Hall of Fame.

== After competing ==
Since retiring from top-level competition, Anderson has become a squash club owner in Toronto, and founded Anderson Courts and Sports Surfaces Inc., a firm which specializes in installing squash courts.
