= Rainer Ratinac =

Australian squash player

Rainer Michael Ratinac is an Australian former squash. He was one of the leading players on the North American hardball squash circuit in the 1970s.

Ratinac was the runner-up at the US Open squash championship in 1974.

After retiring Ratinac became a Baptist minister, working as a sports chaplain.
