= Ken Binns =

Australian squash and tennis player

Kenneth Keith Binns is a former hardball squash player as well as tennis player from Newcastle, NSW, Australia. Born February 8, 1935 in Muswellbrook, NSW, Australia. Father of three children : Todd Binns who was also a World Ranked Squash Champion, Susan Masse and Jo-Anne Binns. Grandfather of Susan's children, Desiree Kotnala and Anthony Sabato. Having lived in Naples Florida, at the age of 85, he has recently returned to Australia and is now living in Queensland.

Sporting Person: BINNS, KEN, Squash/tennis

Ken Binns won the Newcastle, Australia Squash Championship from 1960 to 1966, the NSW Country Squash Titles until asked not to play because of his previous dominance. He represented Australia on the first touring side to England in 1962/3, reaching the semi-finals of the British Open Squash Championships. Ken previously competed in tennis and won the Newcastle Singles Championship in 1956, 1957, 1960 and NSW Country Singles Championship in 1957, 1958, 1959, 1961. In an amazing feat of stamina and skill, Ken won both the Tennis and Squash Country Championships which were run concurrently in Wollongong, Australia circa 1960. In 1967 Binns accepted an offer to be touring player and coach at the Montreal Squash and Badminton Club and the Mount Royal Tennis Club in Canada.

Ken was the Newcastle and NSW Country Champion in tennis from 1957 to 1967. At the same time, from 1961 to 1966, he was the Newcastle and NSW Country Champion in squash.

He represented Canada in the World Masters in tennis, was a finalist in the North American Open Squash championship, which was won by Sharif Khan, son of Hashim Khan, the famed World Champion of many years. Ken continued to win numerous World Doubles titles with Mohibullah Khan.

Binns was runner-up to Sharif Khan at the North American Open in 1971. Partnering Mo Khan, Binns won both the US and Canadian national doubles titles.

Binns competed a handful of times at the Canadian Open tennis championship, most notably reaching the round of 16 in 1969. He was runner-up in the 1970 Quebec Open Championships to Robert Bédard, who won his seventh Quebec championship in the event. Binns defeated Georges Goven at the Canadian Open in 1972 on clay in the second round.
