= Kenton Jernigan =

American squash player

Kenton L. Jernigan is a squash player from the United States. He was one of the leading hardball squash players in the US in the 1980s and 1990s.

Jernigan won the US national singles title three consecutive times in 1983-85. Representing the Harvard Crimson men's squash team,, he won the US intercollegiate singles title three times in 1983-84 and 1986. He also helped Harvard win several team titles and was a four-time All-American.

In 1994, Jernigan won the men's doubles title at World Hardball Doubles Championship (partnering Jamie Bentley).

Outside squash, Jernigan has worked as the head of investment banking at Jefferies bank.
