= John Nimick =

American squash player and tournament organizer

John G. Nimick (born 1958) is an American squash player and tournament organizer. He was one of the leading hardball squash players in the United States in the 1980s. Following his retirement as a professional player, he has become a central figure in the development of professional squash in the United States.

In 1981, Nimick captained Princeton University to a national title and won the national individual intercollegiate title. He won the US national championships in 1982. He then turned professional and became a leading player on the North American hardball squash tour, winning several major titles. Additionally, he represented the United States at the 1983 and 1985 World Team Squash Championships.

Nimick was president of the professional hardball squash association from 1988 to 1990 and executive director of the professional softball squash association from 1994 to 1999. He then formed Event Engine Inc., an event promotion firm, to run international squash tournaments, including the US Open in Boston, the Tournament of Champions in New York City, the Netsuite Open in San Francisco, and the Canadian Squash Classic in Toronto, Ontario.

Nimick was inducted into the United States Squash Racquets Association Hall of Fame in 2006.

He is married to Kate Nimick and has a son, Tyler. He has a brother, Chip Nimick, and a sister, Anne Nimick Neilson.
