= Hardball squash =

Racquet sport

Hardball squash is a format of the indoor racquet sport squash which was first developed in North America in the late 19th century and early 20th century. It is sometimes referred to as being the "American version" of the sport. Compared to the "British version" of the game—which today is usually referred to as being the "international" version, or "softball" squash—the hardball game is played using a harder rubber ball which plays faster, and usually on a smaller court for singles play, or a much larger court for the doubles game.

Records of squash being played in Canada go back to the early 1880s. There it was found that the softer squash balls being used in Britain were not ideally suited to playing in the extremely cold conditions of the Canadian winter, and so a harder rubber ball was developed. It was quickly discovered that this ball was better suited to playing on slightly narrower courts than were used in the British version of the game. As the popularity of the game spread around Canada, the United States and Mexico, court specifications were codified. In 1924, it was decided to standardize the court width for the hardball games at 18 1/2 feet (5.6 m), with a 'tin' at the bottom of the front wall which was 17 inches (430 mm) high—whereas the British version of the game was played on a 21-foot-wide court (6.4 m), with a 19-inch 'tin' (480 mm). By 1929, official court plans were being sold by the United States Squash Racquets Association (USSRA) (now called U.S. Squash), and the hardball game was brought into controlled growth.

Hardball squash was largely the only form of the game played in North America until the 1980s. Growing exposure to the international version of the game then led to many clubs in North America building 21-foot-wide courts (6.4 m), and the "soft" ball being used on wide and narrow courts. Additionally, the USSRA recognised a 20-foot width (6.1 m) as being acceptable for playing the international version (this width being derived from an increasing trend of converting racquetball courts for squash play). By the mid-1990s, the vast majority of squash players in North America had switched to playing the international version of the game. In 1996, 80% of squash ball sales in the United States were of the international-format balls.

Though hardball squash is no longer a very popular game for singles play, the hardball doubles game continues to thrive. Hardball doubles is played on a court measuring 45 ft long (14 m) and 25 ft wide (7.6 m). Hardball doubles differs from singles in that the game is played up to 15 points and you do not have to win by 2 points. The strategy in hardball doubles differs from singles as well; where in singles squash the strategy is to keep the ball on the side wall, hardball doubles strategy is based on hitting attacking cross-court shots to move your 2 opponents around the court to create an opening to score.

== Notable hardball squash players ==
- Gordon Anderson
- Ken Binns
- Clive Caldwell
- Michael Desaulniers
- Stuart Goldstein
- Ralph Howe
- Sam Howe
- Kenton Jernigan
- Aziz Khan
- Sharif Khan
- Diehl Mateer
- Victor Niederhoffer
- John Nimick
- Rainer Ratinac
- Henri Salaun
- Mario Sánchez
- Mark Talbott

Most observers consider Sharif Khan (late-1960s to early-1980s) and Mark Talbott (mid-1980s to mid-1990s) to be the two greatest players of all time in the hardball game.

Softball champions who also enjoyed notable success on the North American hardball circuit

- Azam Khan
- Hashim Khan
- Jahangir Khan
- Mo Khan
- Roshan Khan

Well-known recreational players

- Donald Rumsfeld
- Arlen Specter
