= Sharif Khan =

Pakistani-Canadian squash player

Personal information
- Nickname: "The Sheriff"
- Born: 1945 (age 80–81) Pakistan

Sport
- Country: Canada
Medal record
Men's squash
Representing Pakistan
North American Open
Silver medal – second place	1968 Indianapolis
Gold medal – first place	1969 Cincinnati
Gold medal – first place	1970 Chicago
Gold medal – first place	1971 Toronto
Gold medal – first place	1972 Louisville
Gold medal – first place	1973 Pittsburgh
Gold medal – first place	1974 Toronto
Silver medal – second place	1975 Mexico City
Gold medal – first place	1976 New York
Gold medal – first place	1977 Philadelphia
Gold medal – first place	1978 Toronto
Gold medal – first place	1979 New York
Gold medal – first place	1980 Salt Lake City
Gold medal – first place	1981 Toronto
Silver medal – second place	1982 Cleveland

Sharif Khan (born 1945) is a Pakistani-Canadian retired professional squash player. He is widely considered to be one of the all-time great players of hardball squash (a North American variant of squash played with a faster-moving ball and on slightly smaller courts than the international "softball" squash game). He was the dominant player on the hardball squash circuit throughout the 1970s. Sharif was born in Pakistan, and is the son of the legendary squash player Hashim Khan, who dominated the international squash scene in the 1950s.

== Biography ==
Sharif is the eldest of Hashim Khan's 12 children, and a member of the Khan squash family. At the age of 11, he was awarded a squash scholarship at Millfield School in Somerset, England. Despite having almost no knowledge of the English language when he arrived, he performed well academically and also developed into an outstanding squash player who, by 1962, had won every public school title open to him including the public schools under-15 championship (three times), the public schools under-16 championship, the Evans Cup, and the Drysdale Cup (considered at the time to be the unofficial world junior championship). At the age of 13 he also captured the Somerset County Men's A title. In the two years after he left Millfield, Sharif won the West of England title, the East of England title, the Surrey Open and the Scottish Amateur title. In 1970, he reached the semi-finals of the British Open (which was considered to be the effective world championship of the sport at the time).

Khan's greatest achievements came on the North American hardball squash circuit. He settled in Canada in 1968, and came to dominate the professional hardball squash circuit for well over a decade. He captured every major North American hardball title, and won the North American Open (the most prestigious hardball title at the time) a record 12 times in 13 years between 1969 and 1981 (failing to win it only in 1975, when he was defeated by Victor Niederhoffer; he reached the final 15 consecutive times between 1968 and 1982). He also won the US Professional Championships nine times in ten years between 1970 and 1979.

In winning his final North American open title in 1981, Sharif beat his younger brother Aziz Khan in the final. Three other brothers, Gulmast, Liaqat Ali ("Charlie"), and Salim ("Sam"), also competed in top-level hardball squash.

In 2004, Khan became the first non-US citizen to be inducted into the United States Squash Racquets Association Hall of Fame.

On September 24, 2015, Khan was inducted into the Ontario Sports Hall of Fame in Toronto.
