= Clive Caldwell (squash player) =

Canadian squash player

Clive Caldwell is a squash player from Canada. He was one of the leading hardball squash players in North America in the late-1970s and early-1980s.

Caldwell was the first leading professional player to adopt the oversized racquet head, which is now the standard in modern squash.

== See also ==
- World Squash Doubles Championships
