= Mark Talbott =

American squash player and coach

Mark Talbott is an American squash coach and former professional squash player. He is known as one of the all-time great players of hardball squash.

Talbott was inducted into the United States Squash Hall of Fame in 2000. He was the World Professional Squash Association Player of the Year eight times and an Olympic Athlete of the Year in 1991, `92, and `95. In addition, he captained the first USA Team to compete in the Pan American Games in 1995, earned the Sharif Khan Award for Sportsmanship in 1991, and won the United States Squash Racquets Association (USSRA) President’s Cup in 1989.

== Playing career ==
Raised in Dayton, Ohio, Talbott graduated from the Mercersburg Academy in 1978. He joined the World Professional Squash Association hardball tour in 1980 and was ranked as the World No. 1 hardball squash player for 13 years, from 1983–95. He won 70% of the tournaments he entered during that period.

Talbott is considered the most dominant American squash player in history. His strongest international rival is Sharif Khan, a Pakistani-born player who emigrated to Canada in the late-1960s, and who retired shortly before Talbott emerged on the scene. The most significant factor which militates against Talbott being the greatest hardball squash player of all-time is his record against Sharif's distant cousin Jahangir Khan. In the mid-1980s, Talbott had begun to establish himself as the most dominant player in the hardball squash game, while Jahangir was the clear leading player on the international softball squash circuit. During 1983-86, Jahangir decided to test his ability on the North American hardball circuit. Talbott and Jahangir faced each other on 11 occasions in hardball tournaments during this period (all in tournament finals), and Jahangir won 10 of their encounters. Talbott did however manage to beat Jahangir once, in the final of the Boston Open in 1984, a feat which no player on the international softball circuit managed in the 1981-86 period when Jahangir compiled a five-year winning streak.

In response to the challenge from Jahangir, Talbott acquired a personal coach, Ken Binns, who helped him develop a much sharper array of shots. As the rivalry developed, their matches became very competitive and drew considerable attention. After 1986, Jahangir stopped playing on the hardball circuit to focus more on the softball game. Whether Talbott would have been able to turn the tide had the rivalry continued will therefore never be known. But the experience of playing against Jahangir undoubtedly helped spur Talbott's game to new heights in the later part of the 1980s, when he dominated the hardball circuit. He also represented the United States at the 1983 & 1985 World Team Squash Championships. Doubles partners have included US Squash Hall of Famer Peter Briggs with whom he was partnered in 1984 and 1985.

== Coaching career ==
Since retiring as a player, Talbott has worked as a squash coach. The Talbott Squash Academy, a well-respected summer camp for juniors and adults, was established in 1991, and is currently held at St George's School, Middletown, Rhode Island, and at Stanford University. In 1998, he was appointed the head coach of the Yale University women's team, joining his brother, David Talbott, who had been the men's coach at Yale for fifteen years. After being ranked sixth upon Mark's arrival, the Yale women unseated the reigning champions, Trinity College, in 2004. Later that year, Talbott resigned from his position at Yale and moved to California to become the Director of Squash at Stanford University, where he is working to help expand squash on the West Coast.

Talbott is the grandson of Bud Talbott, the former head coach of the Dayton Triangles and, the brother-in-law of the celebrity chef Ming Tsai, who played squash at Yale, and was one of the top players in the US in the late 1980s and early 1990s.

Talbott currently resides in Palo Alto, California, with his wife and two children.
