= Squash at the 2015 Pan American Games – Women's singles =

Squash – Women's singles at the 2015 Pan American Games
- Venue: Exhibition Centre – Hall C
- Dates: July 11–13
- Competitors: 15 from 8 nations

Medalists
Gold medal	Amanda Sobhy	United States
Silver medal	Olivia Clyne	United States
Bronze medal	Samantha Cornett	Canada
Bronze medal	Samantha Terán	Mexico

The women's singles squash event of the 2015 Pan American Games was held from July 11–13 at the Exhibition Centre in Toronto. The defending Pan American Games champion is Samantha Terán of Mexico, finished as one of the two bronze medallists.

The athletes were drawn into elimination stage draw. An athlete that lost a match was no longer able to compete. Each match was contested as the best of five games. A game was won when one side first scored 11 points. A point was awarded to the winning side of each rally. If the score became 10-all, the side which gained a two-point lead first won that game.

== Schedule ==
All times are Central Standard Time (UTC-6).

Date	Time	Round
July 11, 2015	10:06	First Round
July 12, 2015	10:07	Quarterfinals
July 12, 2015	19:07	Semifinals
July 13, 2015	20:37	Final

== Results ==
=== Finals ===
Semifinals
Amanda Sobhy (USA)	11	11	11
Samantha Cornett (CAN)	8	3	3
Olivia Clyne (USA)	11	11	11
S Terán (MEX)	7	6	7

Final
Amanda Sobhy (USA)	11	11	11
Olivia Clyne (USA)	8	3	3

=== Top half ===
First Round
T Serafini (BRA)	11	11	11
K Urrutia (MEX)	3	2	5
A Falcione (ARG)	7	8	9
G Delgado (CHI)	11	11	11
P Anckermann (GUA)	6	4	0
S Cornett (CAN)	11	11	11

Quarterfinals
A Sobhy (USA)	11	11	11
T Serafini (BRA)	7	7	3
G Delgado (CHI)	6	5	5
S Cornett (CAN)	11	11	11

Semifinals
A Sobhy (USA)	11	11	11
S Cornett (CAN)	8	3	3

=== Bottom half ===
First Round
O Clyne (USA)	11	11	11
T Damasio (BRA)	5	5	2
W Bonilla (GUA)	4	9	5
A Pinto (CHI)	11	11	11
H Naughton (CAN)	11	11	11
F Rocha (ARG)	4	5	6
K González (COL)	3	4	0
S Terán (MEX)	11	11	11

Quarterfinals
O Clyne (USA)	11	11	11
A Pinto (CHI)	3	4	7
H Naughton (CAN)	11	7	9	0
S Terán (MEX)	7	11	11	11

Semifinals
O Clyne (USA)	11	11	11
S Terán (MEX)	7	6	7

== Final standings ==
Rank	Name	Nation
1st place, gold medalist(s)	Amanda Sobhy	United States
2nd place, silver medalist(s)	Olivia Clyne	United States
3rd place, bronze medalist(s)	Samantha Cornett	Canada
3rd place, bronze medalist(s)	Samantha Terán	Mexico
5	Thaisa Serafini	Brazil
5	Hollie Naughton	Canada
5	Giselle Delgado	Chile
5	Anita Pinto	Chile
9	Antonella Falcione	Argentina
9	Fernanda Rocha	Argentina
9	Tatiana Damasio	Brazil
9	Karol González	Colombia
9	Pamela Anckermann	Guatemala
9	Winifer Bonilla	Guatemala
9	Karla Urrutia	Mexico
