= Squash at the 2019 Pan American Games – Women's team =

Squash – Women's team at the 2019 Pan American Games
- Venue: CAR Voleibol en la Videna
- Dates: July 28–31
- Competitors: 24 from 8 nations

Medalists
Gold medal	Olivia Clyne; Amanda Sobhy; Sabrina Sobhy	United States
Silver medal	Samantha Cornett; Danielle Letourneau; Hollie Naughton	Canada
Bronze medal	Dina Anguiano; Samantha Terán; Diana García	Mexico
Bronze medal	Catalina Peláez; Laura Tovar; María Tovar	Colombia

The women's team squash event of the 2019 Pan American Games was held from July 28 – July 31 at the CAR Voleibol en la Videna in Lima, Peru. The defending Pan American Games champion is the team from Canada.

The United States team took the gold by defeating Canada in the finals. Colombia and Mexico took home the bronze medals, which repeated the same results from four years prior in Toronto.

== Results ==
=== Round Robin ===
The round robin will be used as a qualification round. The 8 teams will be split into groups of four. All teams will advance to the quarterfinals. The following is the group results.

==== Pool A ====
Nation	Pld	W	L	GF	GA	PF	PA	Points
United States	3	3	0	27	0	298	87	6
Mexico	3	2	1	18	13	270	220	4
Argentina	3	1	2	8	24	201	326	2
Chile	3	0	3	8	24	188	324	0

==== Pool B ====
Nation	Pld	W	L	GF	GA	PF	PA	Points
Canada	3	3	0	24	3	293	145	6
Colombia	3	2	1	21	8	292	190	4
Guyana	3	1	2	11	18	209	264	2
Peru	3	0	3	0	27	102	297	0

== Playoffs ==
The following is the playoff results.

Quarterfinals
United States	3
Peru	0
Guyana	0
Mexico	2
Colombia	2
Argentina	0
Chile	0
Canada	3

Semifinals
United States	3
Mexico (bronze)	0
Colombia (bronze)	0
Canada	3

Gold medal match
United States (gold)	2
Canada (silver)	0

=== 5th-8th place ===
The following is 5th-8th place round results.

5th-8th place
Peru	0
Guyana	3
Argentina	2
Chile	1

5th place
Guyana	0
Argentina	2
7th place
Peru	1
Chile	2

== Final standings ==
Rank	Nation	Name
1st place, gold medalist(s)	United States	Olivia Clyne; Amanda Sobhy; Sabrina Sobhy
2nd place, silver medalist(s)	Canada	Samantha Cornett; Danielle Letourneau; Hollie Naughton
3rd place, bronze medalist(s)	Mexico	Dina Anguiano; Samantha Terán; Diana García
3rd place, bronze medalist(s)	Colombia	Catalina Peláez; Laura Tovar; María Tovar
5	Argentina	Camila Grosso; Pilar Etchechoury; Antonella Falcione
6	Guyana	Mary Fung-A-Fat; Ashley Khalil; Taylor Fernandes
7	Chile	Giselle Delgado; Camila Gallegos; Ana Pinto
8	Peru	Maria Hermosa; Ximena Rodríguez; Alejandra Zavala
