= Squash at the 2015 Pan American Games =

- Squash pictogram for the games
- Venue: Exhibition Centre – Hall C
- Dates: July 11–17
- No. of events: 6 (3 men, 3 women)
- Competitors: 56 from 13 nations

Squash competitions at the 2015 Pan American Games in Toronto was held from July 11 to 17. The venue for the competitions was Direct Energy Centre (Exhibition Centre), due to naming rights the venue was known as the latter for the duration of the games. The venue also staged the racquetball. A total of six events were contested (three each for men and women).

== Competition schedule ==
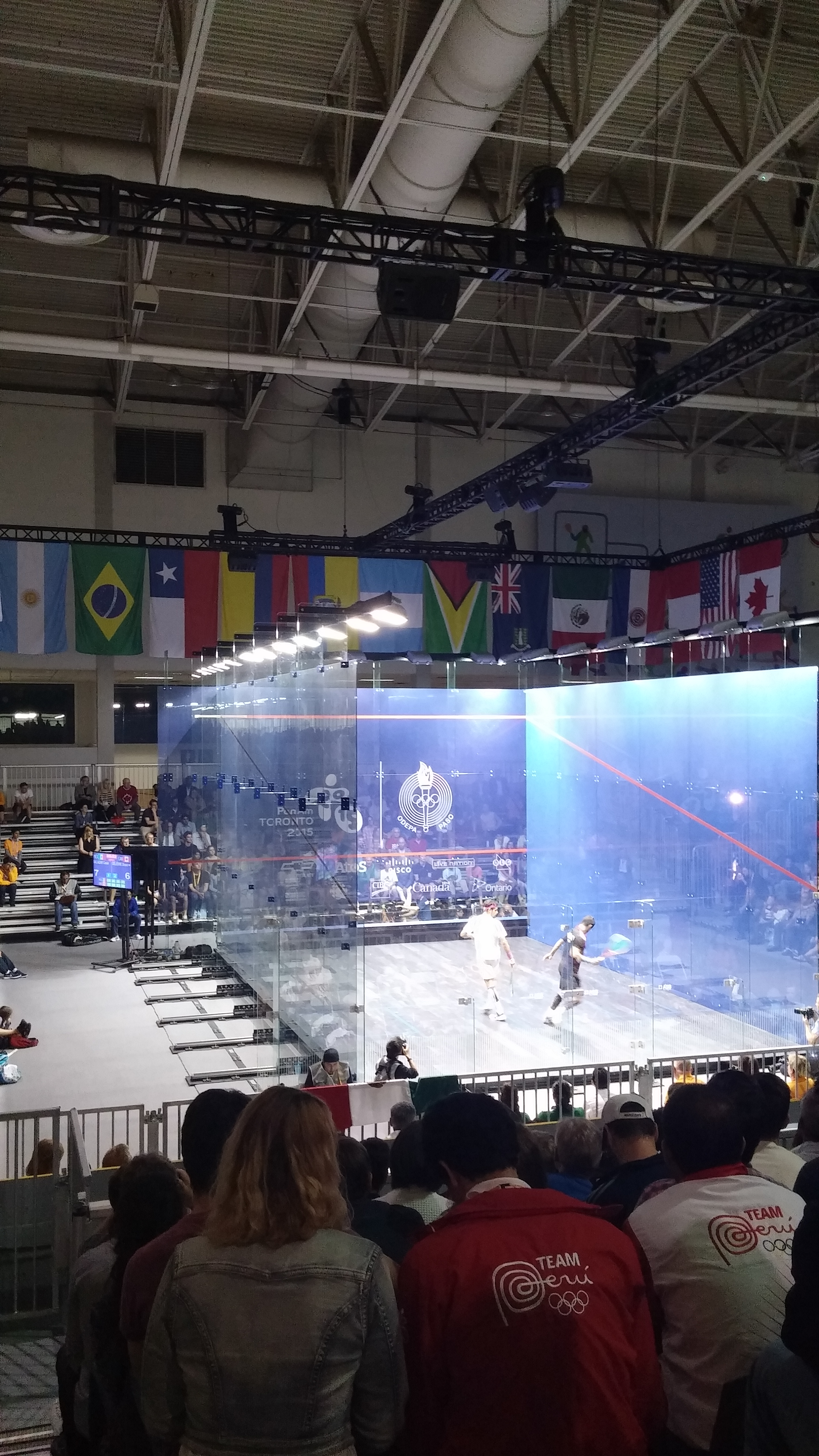
The Direct Energy Centre (Exhibition Centre), was the venue for the squash competitions

The following is the competition schedule for the squash competitions:

RR	Round robin	E	Eliminations	¼	Quarterfinals	½	Semifinals	F	Final

Event↓/Date →	Sat 11		Sun 12	Mon 13	Tue 14	Wed 15	Thu 16	Fri 17
Men's singles	E	¼	½	F				
Men's doubles			E	E	F			
Men's team					RR	RR	E	F
Women's singles	E	¼	½	F				
Women's doubles			E	E	F			
Women's team					RR	RR	E	F

== Medal table ==
* Host nation (Canada)

Rank	Nation	Gold	Silver	Bronze	Total
1	United States	3	1	2	6
2	Colombia	2	0	2	4
3	Canada*	1	3	2	6
4	Mexico	0	1	4	5
5	Peru	0	1	1	2
6	Argentina	0	0	1	1
Totals (6 entries)		6	6	12	24

== Medalists ==
=== Men's events ===
Event	Gold	Silver	Bronze
Men's singles	Miguel Ángel Rodríguez; Colombia	Diego Elías; Peru	Shawn Delierre; Canada
Men's singles	Miguel Ángel Rodríguez; Colombia	Diego Elías; Peru	César Salazar; Mexico
Men's doubles	Colombia; Andrés Herrera; Juan Camilo Vargas	Canada; Andrew Schnell; Graeme Schnell	United States; Christopher Gordon; Chris Hanson
Men's doubles	Colombia; Andrés Herrera; Juan Camilo Vargas	Canada; Andrew Schnell; Graeme Schnell	Peru; Andrés Duany; Diego Elías
Men's team	Canada; Shawn Delierre; Andrew Schnell; Graeme Schnell	Mexico; Eric Gálvez; César Salazar; Arturo Salazar	Argentina; Rodrigo Pezzota; Robertino Pezzota; Leandro Romiglio
Men's team	Canada; Shawn Delierre; Andrew Schnell; Graeme Schnell	Mexico; Eric Gálvez; César Salazar; Arturo Salazar	United States; Christopher Gordon; Chris Hanson; Todd Harrity

=== Women's events ===
Event	Gold	Silver	Bronze
Women's singles	Amanda Sobhy; United States	Olivia Clyne; United States	Samantha Cornett; Canada
Women's singles	Amanda Sobhy; United States	Olivia Clyne; United States	Samantha Terán; Mexico
Women's doubles	United States; Natalie Grainger; Amanda Sobhy	Canada; Samantha Cornett; Nikki Todd	Colombia; Catalina Peláez; Laura Tovar
Women's doubles	United States; Natalie Grainger; Amanda Sobhy	Canada; Samantha Cornett; Nikki Todd	Mexico; Samantha Terán; Karla Urrutia
Women's team	United States; Olivia Clyne; Natalie Grainger; Amanda Sobhy	Canada; Samantha Cornett; Nikki Todd; Hollie Naughton	Mexico; Samantha Terán; Karla Urrutia; Diana García
Women's team	United States; Olivia Clyne; Natalie Grainger; Amanda Sobhy	Canada; Samantha Cornett; Nikki Todd; Hollie Naughton	Colombia; Catalina Peláez; Laura Tovar; Karol González

== Participating nations ==
A total of 13 countries qualified athletes. The number of athletes a nation entered is in parentheses beside the name of the country.

- Argentina (6)
- Brazil (3)
- British Virgin Islands (1)
- Canada (6)
- Chile (6)
- Colombia (6)
- Ecuador (3)
- Guatemala (6)
- Guyana (3)
- Mexico (6)
- Paraguay (1)
- Peru (3)
- United States (6)

== Qualification ==
A total of 56 athletes qualified to compete at the Games (32 male, 24 female). Each country was allowed to enter a maximum of three male and three female athletes. The top ten men's teams and top eight women's teams (including Canada) at the 2014 Pan American Sports Festival qualified the games. A further two wildcards were allocated (2 men). A nation may enter a maximum of two athletes per singles events, and one doubles per event.
