= Squash at the 2015 Pan American Games – Women's team =

Squash – Women's team at the 2015 Pan American Games
- Venue: Exhibition Centre – Hall C
- Dates: July 14–17
- Competitors: 24 from 8 nations

Medalists
Gold medal	Olivia Clyne; Natalie Grainger; Amanda Sobhy	United States
Silver medal	Samantha Cornett; Hollie Naughton; Nikki Todd	Canada
Bronze medal	Karol González; Catalina Peláez; Laura Tovar	Colombia
Bronze medal	Diana García; Samantha Terán; Karla Urrutia	Mexico

The women's team squash event of the 2015 Pan American Games was held from July 14–17 at the Exhibition Centre in Toronto. The defending Pan American Games champion Canada finished as runners-up to the United States.

== Schedule ==
All times are Central Standard Time (UTC-6).

Date	Time	Round
July 14, 2015	9:00	Round Robin
July 15, 2015	10:00	Round Robin
July 16, 2015	17:30	Places 5 to 8
July 16, 2015	17:30	Semifinals
July 17, 2015	17:30	Places 5 to 6
July 17, 2015	19:45	Places 7 to 8
July 17, 2015	17:30	Final

== Results ==
=== Round Robin ===
The round robin will be used as a qualification round. The eight teams will be split into groups of four. The top two teams from each group will advance to the first round of playoffs.

==== Pool A ====
Nation	Pld	W	L	GF	GA	PF	PA	Points
United States	3	3	0	27	0	298	105	6
Mexico	3	2	1	18	12	246	228	4
Chile	3	1	2	11	19	248	284	2
Guatemala	3	0	3	2	27	142	317	0

==== Pool B ====
Nation	Pld	W	L	GF	GA	PF	PA	Points
Canada	3	3	0	24	4	282	153	6
Colombia	3	2	1	21	10	298	232	4
Argentina	3	1	2	9	23	231	304	2
Brazil	3	0	3	8	25	214	336	0

=== Playoffs ===
==== Places 5 to 8 ====
Places 5 to 8
A3	Chile	3	1	3
B4	Brazil	1	3	1
A4	Guatemala	0	0
B3	Argentina	3	2

Places 5 to 6
A3	Chile	3	2	1
B3	' Argentina	0	3	3
Places 7 to 8
B4	Brazil	3	3
A4	Guatemala	1	0

==== Gold medal ====
Semifinals
A1	United States	3	3
B2	Colombia	0	0
A2	Mexico	0	1	0
B1	Canada	3	3	2

Final
A1	United States	3	3	RET
B1	Canada	0	0	1

== Final standings ==
Rank	Nation	Name
1st place, gold medalist(s)	United States	Olivia Clyne; Natalie Grainger; Amanda Sobhy
2nd place, silver medalist(s)	Canada	Samantha Cornett; Hollie Naughton; Nikki Todd
3rd place, bronze medalist(s)	Colombia	Karol González; Catalina Peláez; Laura Tovar
3rd place, bronze medalist(s)	Mexico	Diana García; Samantha Terán; Karla Urrutia
5	Argentina	Pilar Etchechoury; Antonella Falcione; Fernanda Rocha
6	Chile	Giselle Delgado; Fran Monsalve; Anita Pinto
7	Brazil	Tatiana Damasio; Thaisa Serafini; Giovanna Veiga
8	Guatemala	Pamela Anckermann; Irene Barillas; Winifer Bonilla
