= Squash at the 2015 Pan American Games – Women's doubles =

Squash – Women's doubles at the 2015 Pan American Games
- Venue: Exhibition Centre – Hall C
- Dates: July 13–14
- Competitors: 16 from 8 nations

Medalists
Gold medal	Natalie Grainger; Amanda Sobhy	United States
Silver medal	Samantha Cornett; Nikki Todd	Canada
Bronze medal	Samantha Terán; Karla Urrutia	Mexico
Bronze medal	Catalina Peláez; Laura Tovar	Colombia

The women's doubles squash event of the 2015 Pan American Games was held on July 13 and 14 at the Exhibition Centre in Toronto. The defending Pan American Games champion were Nayelly Hernández and Samantha Terán of Mexico.

== Schedule ==
All times are Central Standard Time (UTC-6).

Date	Time	Round
July 13, 2015	9:06	Quarterfinals
July 13, 2015	18:34	Semifinals
July 14, 2015	19:08	Final

== Results ==
=== Draw ===
Quarterfinals
S Terán (Mexico) K Urrutia (MEX)	11	8	11
G Delgado (Chile) A Pinto (CHI)	9	11	7
P Anckermann (Guatemala) W Bonilla (GUA)	7	5
S Cornett (Canada) N Todd (CAN)	11	11
T Damasio (Brazil) G Veiga (BRA)	3	10
N Grainger (United States) A Sobhy (USA)	11	11
A Falcione (Argentina) F Rocha (ARG)	2	6
C Peláez (Colombia) L Tovar (COL)	11	11

Semifinals
S Terán (Mexico) K Urrutia (MEX)	2	7
S Cornett (Canada) N Todd (CAN)	11	11
N Grainger (United States) A Sobhy (USA)	11	11
C Peláez (Colombia) L Tovar (COL)	6	6

Final
S Cornett (Canada) N Todd (CAN)	9	11	6
N Grainger (United States) A Sobhy (USA)	11	9	11

== Final standings ==
Rank	Name	Nation
1st place, gold medalist(s)	Natalie Grainger; Amanda Sobhy	United States
2nd place, silver medalist(s)	Samantha Cornett; Nikki Todd	Canada
3rd place, bronze medalist(s)	Samantha Terán; Karla Urrutia	Mexico
3rd place, bronze medalist(s)	Catalina Peláez; Laura Tovar	Colombia
5	Antonella Falcione; Fernanda Rocha	Argentina
5	Tatiana Damasio; Giovanna Veiga	Brazil
5	Giselle Delgado; Anita Pinto	Chile
5	Pamela Anckermann; Winifer Bonilla	Guatemala
