= Squash at the 2011 Pan American Games – Women's team =

Squash – Women's team at the 2011 Pan American Games
- Venue: Squash Complex
- Dates: October 18–20
- Competitors: 25 from 8 nations

Medalists
Gold medal	Miranda Ranieri; Samantha Cornett; Stephanie Edmison	Canada
Silver medal	Silvia Angulo; Catalina Peláez; Anna Porras	Colombia
Bronze medal	Nayelly Hernández; Samantha Terán; Imelda Salazar	Mexico
Bronze medal	Olivia Clyne; Maria Ubina; Lily Lorentzen	United States

The women's team competition of the squash events at the 2011 Pan American Games will be held from October 18 to 20 at the Squash Complex in Guadalajara, Mexico. The defending Pan American Games champion is the team from Canada (Carolyn Russell, Runa Reta and Alana Miller).

== Round robin ==
The round robin will be used as a qualification round. The twelve teams will be split into groups of three or four. The top two teams from each group will advance to the first round of playoffs.

=== Pool A ===
Nation	Pld	W	L	GF	GA	PF	PA	Points
United States	3	3	0	20	13	332	295	3
Mexico	3	2	1	23	9	334	247	2
Brazil	3	1	2	15	19	304	325	1
Argentina	3	0	1	9	26	248	351	0

18 October; 13:00	Report	United States	2–1	Brazil	Squash Complex
Score by game:
Olivia Clyne	0–3	Thaisa Serafini
Lily Lorentzen	3–1	Mariana Pontalti
Maria Ubina	2–0	Marina Costa

18 October; 16:00	Report	Mexico	3–0	Argentina	Squash Complex
Score by game:
Samantha Terán	3–0	Antonella Falcione
Nayelly Hernández	3–0	Fernanda Rocha
Imelda Salazar	3–0	Cecilia Cerquetti

19 October; 11:00	Report	United States	2–1	Argentina	Squash Complex
Score by game:
Lily Lorentzen	3–1	Fernanda Rocha
Olivia Clyne	3–0	Antonella Falcione
Maria Ubina	2–3	Cecilia Cerquetti

19 October; 13:00	Report	Brazil	0–3	Mexico	Squash Complex
Score by game:
Mariana Pontalti	1–3	Nayelly Hernández
Thaisa Serafini	0–3	Samantha Terán
Mariana Costa	1–3	Imelda Salazar

19 October; 17:00	Report	United States	2–1	Mexico	Squash Complex
Score by game:
Lily Lorentzen	3–2	Nayelly Hernández
Olivia Clyne	1–3	Samantha Terán
Maria Ubina	3–0	Imelda Salazar

19 October; 19:00	Report	Argentina	0–3	Brazil	Squash Complex
Score by game:
Fernanda Rocha	2–3	Mariana Pontalti
Antonella Falcione	2–3	Thiasa Serafini
Cecilia Cerquetti	1–3	Mariana Costa

=== Pool B ===
Nation	Pld	W	L	GF	GA	PF	PA	Points
Canada	3	3	0	27	4	329	176	3
Colombia	3	2	1	21	10	304	216	2
Guatemala	3	1	2	7	23	214	301	1
Chile	3	0	3	6	24	157	311	0

18 October; 13:00	Report	Canada	3–0	Chile	Squash Complex
Score by game:
Miranda Ranieri	3–0	Ana María Pinto
Stephanie Edmison	3–0	Omella Gonzalez
Samantha Cornett	3–0	Sandra Pinto

18 October; 16:00	Report	Colombia	3–0	Guatemala	Squash Complex
Score by game:
Silvia Angulo	3–0	Pamela Anckerman
Anna Porras	3–0	Nicolle Anckerman
Catalina Peláez	3–0	Winifer Bonilla

19 October; 11:00	Report	Canada	3–0	Guatemala	Squash Complex
Score by game:
Stephanie Edmison	3–0	Nicolle Anckerman
Miranda Ranieri	3–1	Pamela Anckerman
Samantha Cornett	3–0	Winifer Bonilla

19 October; 13:00	Report	Chile	0–3	Colombia	Squash Complex
Score by game:
Omella Gonzalez	0–3	Anna Porras
Ana María Pinto	1–3	Silvia Angulo
Sandra Pinto	0–3	Catalina Peláez

19 October; 17:00	Report	Canada	3–0	Colombia	Squash Complex
Score by game:
Stephanie Edmison	3–0	Anna Porras
Miranda Ranieri	3–1	Silvia Angulo
Samantha Cornett	3–2	Catalina Peláez

19 October; 17:00	Report	Guatemala	2–1	Chile	Squash Complex
Score by game:
Nicolle Anckerman	3–2	Omella Gonzalez
Pamela Anckerman	0–3	Ana María Pinto
Winifer Bonillo	3–0	Sandra Pinto

== Playoffs ==
Semifinals
A1	United States	3	1	0
B2	Colombia	0	3	2
A2	Mexico	3	0	0
B1	Canada	0	3	3

Final
B2	Colombia	1	1
B1	Canada	3	3

=== Semifinals ===
20 October; 9:00	Report	United States	1–2	Colombia	Squash Complex
Score by game:
Olivia Clyne	3–0	Silvia Angulo
Maria Ubina	1–3	Catalina Peláez
Lily Lorentzen (ret.)	0–2	Anna Porras

20 October; 9:00	Report	Mexico	1–2	Canada	Squash Complex
Score by game:
Samantha Terán	3–0	Miranda Ranieri
Imelda Salazar	0–3	Samantha Cornett
Nayelly Hernández	0–3	Stephanie Edmison

=== Final ===
21 October; 11:00	Report	Colombia	0–2	Canada	Squash Complex
Score by game:
Catalina Peláez	1–3	Samantha Cornett
Silvia Angulo	1–3	Miranda Ranieri
