= Squash at the 2019 Pan American Games – Women's singles =

Squash – Women's singles at the 2019 Pan American Games
- Venue: CAR Voleibol en la Videna
- Dates: July 25 – July 27
- Competitors: 14 from 7 nations

Medalists
Gold medal	Amanda Sobhy	United States
Silver medal	Olivia Clyne	United States
Bronze medal	Hollie Naughton	Canada
Bronze medal	Samantha Cornett	Canada

The women's singles squash event at the 2019 Pan American Games will be held from July 25th – July 27th at the CAR Voleibol en la Videna in Lima, Peru.

== Format ==
Each National Olympic Committee could enter a maximum of two athletes into the competition. The athletes will be drawn into an elimination stage draw. Once an athlete lost a match, they will be no longer able to compete. Each match will be contested as the best of five games.

== Results ==
=== Bracket ===
Round of 16
Ashley Khalil (GUY)	8	12	11	3
Giselle Delgado (CHI)	11	14	7	11
Antonella Falcione (ARG)	11	11	11
Maria Reano (PER)	1	4	5
Dina Gomez (MEX)	2	9	5
Hollie Naughton (CAN)	11	11	11
Samantha Cornett (CAN)	13	11	11
Pilar Etchechoury (ARG)	11	0	7
Ana Pinto (CHI)	11	11	7	12
Mary Fung-A-Fat (GUY)	7	4	11	10
Diana García (MEX)	11	11	11
Ximena Rodríguez (PER)	3	3	0

Quarterfinals
Amanda Sobhy (USA)	11	11	11
Giselle Delgado (CHI)	4	4	3
Antonella Falcione (ARG)	5	2	6
Hollie Naughton (CAN)	11	11	11
Samantha Cornett (CAN)	11	11	11
Ana Pinto (CHI)	6	5	6
Diana García (MEX)	8	4	4
Olivia Clyne (USA)	11	11	11

Semifinals
Amanda Sobhy (USA)	11	12	11
Hollie Naughton (CAN)	6	10	8
Samantha Cornett (CAN)	7	5	6
Olivia Clyne (USA)	11	11	11

Final
Amanda Sobhy (USA)	7	11	11	11
Olivia Clyne (USA)	11	5	7	8
