= Squash at the 2013 World Games – women's singles =

2013 World Games – Squash Single Women
Host	(Colombia) Cali
Dates	August 2–4, 2013
Teams	19
Podium
Champion	(Malaysia) Nicol David
Runners-up	(Netherlands) Natalie Grinham
Third place	(France) Camille Serme
Fourth place	(Malaysia) Low Wee Wern

The Squash – Single Women competition at the World Games 2013 take place from 2 August to 4 August 2013 in Cali in Colombia, at the Canas Gordas Comfenalco Club.

== Seeds ==
1. (Malaysia) Nicol David (champion)
2. (Malaysia) Low Wee Wern (semifinals)
3. (Netherlands) Natalie Grinham (final)
4. (France) Camille Serme (semifinals)
5. (Australia) Rachael Grinham (quarterfinals)
6. (Australia) Donna Urquhart (round of 16)
7. (United Kingdom) Sarah-Jane Perry (quarterfinals)
8. (Mexico) Samantha Terán (round of 16)

== Draw ==
First Round
(Guyana) Mary Fung-a-Fat	0
9/16	(Germany) Franziska Hennes	3
9/16	(Colombia) Catalina Peláez	3
(Hungary) Edina Szombati	0
(Colombia) Laura Tovar	1
9/16	(Brazil) Thaisa Serafini	3

Round of 16
1	(Malaysia) Nicol David	3
9/16	(Germany) Franziska Hennes	0
9/16	(Canada) Samantha Cornett	1
7	(United Kingdom) Sarah-Jane Perry	3
5	(Australia) Rachael Grinham	3
9/16	(India) Joshna Chinappa	0
9/16	(Colombia) Catalina Peláez	0
4	(France) Camille Serme	3
3	(Netherlands) Natalie Grinham	3
9/16	(Brazil) Thaisa Serafini	0
9/16	(Japan) Misaki Kobayashi	3
8	(Mexico) Samantha Terán	2
6	(Australia) Donna Urquhart	0
9/16	(United Kingdom) Emma Beddoes	3
9/16	(Pakistan) Maria Toor Pakay	w/o
2	(Malaysia) Low Wee Wern

Quarter finals
1	(Malaysia) Nicol David	3
7	(United Kingdom) Sarah-Jane Perry	0
5	(Australia) Rachael Grinham	1
4	(France) Camille Serme	3
3	(Netherlands) Natalie Grinham	3
9/16	(Japan) Misaki Kobayashi	1
9/16	(United Kingdom) Emma Beddoes	0
2	(Malaysia) Low Wee Wern	3

Semi finals
1	(Malaysia) Nicol David	3
4	(France) Camille Serme	0
3	(Netherlands) Natalie Grinham	3
2	(Malaysia) Low Wee Wern	1

Finals
1	(Malaysia) Nicol David	3
3	(Netherlands) Natalie Grinham	0

Note: * w/d = Withdraw, * w/o = Walkover, * r = Retired

3rd place
4	(France) Camille Serme	3
2	(Malaysia) Low Wee Wern	0
