= Squash at the 2006 Central American and Caribbean Games =

- Location: Cartagena
- Dates: 15–30 July

The Squash competition at the 2006 Central American and Caribbean Games was held in Cartagena, Colombia. The tournament was scheduled to be held from 15 to 30 July 2006.

== Medal summary ==
=== Men's events ===
Event	Gold	Silver	Bronze
Singles	Eric Gálvez (MEX)	Bernardo Samper (COL)	Miguel Ángel Rodríguez (COL)
Singles	Eric Gálvez (MEX)	Bernardo Samper (COL)	Jose Becerril (MEX)
Doubles	Mexico; Eric Gálvez; Arturo Salazar	El Salvador; Jose Coronado; Walter Weisskopf	Colombia; Miguel Ángel Rodríguez; Bernardo Samper
Doubles	Mexico; Eric Gálvez; Arturo Salazar	El Salvador; Jose Coronado; Walter Weisskopf	Barbados; Gavin Cumberbatch; Shawn Simpson
Team	Mexico; Eric Gálvez; Arturo Salazar; Jose Becerril; César Salazar	Colombia; Javier Castilla; Miguel Ángel Rodríguez; Bernardo Samper; Federico Torres	Bermuda; Nicholas Kime; David Shrubb; James Stout; Merlindo Caines

=== Women's events ===
Event	Gold	Silver	Bronze
Singles	Nicolette Fernandes (GUY)	Samantha Terán (MEX)	Silvia Angulo (COL)
Singles	Nicolette Fernandes (GUY)	Samantha Terán (MEX)	Karen Anderson (JAM)
Doubles	Mexico; Karina Herrera; Imelda Salazar	Jamaica; Karen Anderson; Marlene Rabess	Colombia; Silvia Angulo; Catalina Peláez
Doubles	Mexico; Karina Herrera; Imelda Salazar	Jamaica; Karen Anderson; Marlene Rabess	Guatemala; Pamela Anckerman; María Cifuentes
Team	Mexico; Imelda Salazar; Samantha Terán; Karina Herrera; Nayelly Hernández	Colombia; Silvia Angulo; Catalina Peláez; María Restrepo; Mariana de Reyes	Barbados; Karen Meakins; Sonia Perkins; Cheri-Ann Parris; Nadia McCarthy

=== Mixed events ===
Event	Gold	Silver	Bronze
Doubles	Mexico; Samantha Terán; Jose Becerril	Guyana; Nicolette Fernandes; Maxim Weithers	Colombia; María Restrepo; Javier Castilla
Doubles	Mexico; Samantha Terán; Jose Becerril	Guyana; Nicolette Fernandes; Maxim Weithers	Barbados; Karen Meakins; Gavin Cumberbatch

== Medal table ==
* Host nation (Colombia)

Rank	Nation	Gold	Silver	Bronze	Total
1	Mexico	6	1	1	8
2	Guyana	1	1	0	2
3	Colombia*	0	3	5	8
4	Jamaica	0	1	1	2
5	El Salvador	0	1	0	1
6	Barbados	0	0	3	3
7	Bermuda	0	0	1	1
7	Guatemala	0	0	1	1
Totals (8 entries)		7	7	12	26
