= Squash at the 2011 Pan American Games – Women's singles =

Squash – Women's singles at the 2011 Pan American Games
- Venue: Squash Complex
- Dates: October 15–17
- Competitors: 24 from 16 nations

Medalists
Gold medal	Samantha Terán	Mexico
Silver medal	Samantha Cornett	Canada
Bronze medal	Nicolette Fernandes	Guyana
Bronze medal	Miranda Ranieri	Canada

The women's singles squash event of the 2011 Pan American Games was held October 15–17 at the Squash Complex in Guadalajara. The defending Pan American Games champion was Natalie Grainger of the United States.

The athletes were drawn into an elimination stage draw. Once an athlete lost a match, she was no longer able to compete. Each match was contested as the best of five games. A game was won when one side first scores 10 points. A point was awarded to the winning side of each rally. If the score became 11-all, the side which gained a two-point lead first won that game.

== Draw ==
=== Finals ===
Semifinals
S Terán (MEX)	11	11	11
N Fernandes (GUY)	3	5	3
M Ranieri (CAN)	9	5	11	8
S Cornett (CAN)	11	11	5	11

Final
S Terán (MEX)	11	11	11
S Cornett (CAN)	6	4	6

=== Top half ===
First round
A Falcione (ARG)	11	11	11
W Bonilla (GUA)	6	3	1

Second round
S Terán (MEX)	11	11	11
S Pinto (CHI)	0	1	1
C Peláez (COL)	11	11	11
P Anckerman (GUA)	7	3	4
N Fernandes (GUY)	11	11	11
A Falcione (ARG)	8	6	7
T Serafini (BRA)	11	7	11	11
L Lorentzen (USA)	9	11	4	5

Quarterfinals
S Terán (MEX)	11	11	11
C Peláez (COL)	7	7	8
N Fernandes (GUY)	11	11	11
T Serafini (BRA)	9	9	9

Semifinals
S Terán (MEX)	11	11	11
N Fernandes (GUY)	3	5	3

=== Bottom half ===
First round

Second round
M Costa (BRA)	8	7	9
M Ranieri (CAN)	11	11	11
A Pinto (CHI)	4	7	10
S Angulo (COL)	11	11	12
C Cerquetti (ARG)	5	3	3
S Cornett (CAN)	11	11	11
I Salazar (MEX)	11	8	10	11	3
O Clyne (USA)	6	11	12	6	11

Quarterfinals
M Ranieri (CAN)	12	11	4	4	17
S Angulo (COL)	10	5	11	11	15
S Cornett (CAN)	11	11	8	11
O Clyne (USA)	7	9	11	6

Semifinals
M Ranieri (CAN)	9	5	11	8
S Cornett (CAN)	11	11	5	11
