= Squash at the 2023 Pan American Games – Women's team =

Women's team at the 2023 Pan American Games
- Venue: Racket Sports Center
- Dates: November 3 - November 5
- Competitors: 24 from 8 nations

Medalists
Gold medal	Amanda Sobhy; Olivia Clyne; Olivia Weaver	United States
Silver medal	Nikki Todd; Hollie Naughton; Nicole Bunyan	Canada
Bronze medal	Meagan Best; Amanda Haywood; Margot Prow	Barbados
Bronze medal	Catalina Peláez; Laura Tovar; Lucía Bautista	Colombia

The women's team competition of the squash events at the 2023 Pan American Games was held from November 3 to 5 at the Racquet Sports Center (Centro de Entrenamiento del Tenis y Deportes de Raqueta) in Santiago, Chile.

== Format ==
Each National Olympic Committee could enter a maximum of a three-athlete team into the competition. The teams were drawn into an elimination stage draw. Once a team lost a match, they played matches to determine their final rank. Each match was contested as the best of three games. Unlike other events, there is not bronze medal match, so the two losing athletes during the semifinals received a bronze medal.

== Schedule ==
Date	Time	Round
November 3, 2023	10:00	Quarterfinals
November 4, 2023	10:00	Classification 5°-8°
November 4, 2023	12:15	Semifinals
November 4, 2023	17:00	Classification 5°-6°
November 4, 2023	17:00	Classification 7°-8°
November 5, 2023	10:00	Final

== Results ==
The results were as follows

Quarterfinals
United States	2
Independent Athletes Team	0
Chile	0
Barbados	2
Colombia	2
Mexico	1
Ecuador	0
Canada	3

Semifinals
United States	2
Barbados	0
Colombia	0
Canada	3

Final
United States	2
Canada	0

=== 5th-8th place ===
The following is 5th-8th place round results.

5th-8th place
Independent Athletes Team	1
Chile	2
Mexico	2
Ecuador	1

5th place
Chile	0
Mexico	2
7th place
Independent Athletes Team	0
Ecuador	2

== Final standings ==
Rank	Nation	Name
1st place, gold medalist(s)	United States	Amanda Sobhy; Olivia Clyne; Olivia Weaver
2nd place, silver medalist(s)	Canada	Nikki Todd; Hollie Naughton; Nicole Bunyan
3rd place, bronze medalist(s)	Barbados	Meagan Best; Amanda Haywood; Margot Prow
3rd place, bronze medalist(s)	Colombia	Catalina Peláez; Laura Tovar; Lucía Bautista
5	Mexico	Diana García; Sarahi López; Diana Gasca
6	Chile	Antonia Vera; Giselle Delgado; Ana María Pinto
7	Ecuador	Rafaela Albuja; María Buenaño; María Paula Moya
8	Independent Athletes Team	Darlyn Sandoval; Winifer Bonilla; Tabita Gaitan
