= 2025 Women's British Open Squash Championship =

Squash tournament

British Open
- 94th Women's British Open

Details
- Event name: 2025 British Open
- Location: Solihull and Birmingham, England
- Venue: Solihull Arden Club; Birmingham Rep
- Dates: 27 May to 8 June 2025

Women's Winner
- Prize money: $348,500
- Year: 2024–25 PSA World Tour

The Women's 2025 British Open sponsored by GillenMarkets was the 94th women's edition of the 2025 British Open Squash Championships, which is a 2024–25 PSA World Tour event. The event took place at the Solihull Arden Club and the Birmingham Repertory Theatre in England between 27 May and 8 June 2025.

Egypt's Nouran Gohar won the title for the third time, defeating Nour El Sherbini in the final for a second consecutive year.

== Draw and results ==
=== Semi-finals and final ===
Semi-finals
1 | (Egypt) Nouran Gohar | 11 | 11 | 11
4 | (Egypt) Amina Orfi | 6 | 8 | 2
2 | (Egypt) Nour El Sherbini | 11 | 11 | 5 | 11
3 | (United States) Olivia Weaver | 9 | 8 | 11 | 3

Final
1 | (Egypt) Nouran Gohar | 9 | 12 | 7 | 13 | 11
2 | (Egypt) Nour El Sherbini | 11 | 10 | 11 | 11 | 4

=== Main Draw ===
==== Top half ====
First round
1 | (Egypt) Nouran Gohar
[Bye]
9/16 | (England) Jasmine Hutton
[Bye]
(United States) Marina Stefanoni | 5 | 11 | 11 | 11
(Egypt) Mariam Metwally | 11 | 6 | 2 | 3
(England) Lucy Turmel | 11 | 11 | 11
(Scotland) Alison Thomson | 9 | 5 | 7
(Canada) Nicole Bunyan | 11 | 11 | 10 | 11
(Egypt) Menna Hamed | 9 | 6 | 12 | 1
(England) Saran Nghiem | 11 | 11 | 11
(Hong Kong) Lee Ka Yi | 9 | 7 | 3
(Egypt) Kenzy Ayman | 11 | 14 | 11
(Malaysia) Rachel Arnold | 6 | 12 | 5
5 | (Belgium) Tinne Gilis
[Bye]
7 | (Japan) Satomi Watanabe
[Bye]
(France) Mélissa Alves | 11 | 15 | 11
(Wales) Emily Whitlock | 8 | 13 | 7
(Scotland) Lisa Aitken | 3 | 11 | 8 | 3
(India) Anahat Singh | 11 | 6 | 11 | 11
9/16 | (Malaysia) Siva Subramaniam
[Bye]
(England) Torrie Malik | 11 | 11 | 11
(Canada) Hollie Naughton | 7 | 5 | 2
9/16 | (Egypt) Nada Abbas
[Bye]
(France) Camille Serme | 12 | 6 | 11 | 5
(Scotland) Georgia Adderley | 14 | 11 | 6 | 11
4 | (Egypt) Amina Orfi
[Bye]

Second round
1 | (Egypt) Gohar | 11 | 11 | 7 | 13
9/16 | (England) Hutton | 6 | 7 | 11 | 11
(United States) Stefanoni | 11 | 11 | 13 | 11
(England) Turmel | 13 | 2 | 11 | 5
(Canada) Bunyan | 9 | 2 | 12
(England) Nghiem | 11 | 11 | 14
(Egypt) Ayman | 8 | 6 | 11 | 7
5 | (Belgium) Gilis | 11 | 11 | 7 | 11
7 | (Japan) Watanabe | 11 | 11 | 11
(France) Alves | 8 | 5 | 1
9/16 | (Malaysia) Subramaniam | 12 | 9 | 11 | 11
(India) Singh | 10 | 11 | 8 | 7
(England) Malik | 8 | 8 | 8
9/16 | (Egypt) Abbas | 11 | 11 | 11
(Scotland) Adderley | 3 | 4 | 10 | 5
4 | (Egypt) Orfi | 11 | 11 | 12

Third round
1 | (Egypt) Gohar | 11 | 11 | 11
(United States) Stefanoni | 4 | 4 | 4
(England) Nghiem | 1 | 9 | 10
5 | (Belgium) Gilis | 11 | 11 | 12
7 | (Japan) Watanabe | 9 | 19 | 11 | 4
9/16 | (Malaysia) Subramaniam | 11 | 11 | 4 | 11
9/16 | (Egypt) Abbas | 4 | 4 | 8
4 | (Egypt) Orfi | 11 | 11 | 11

Quarter-finals
1 | (Egypt) Gohar | 11 | 11 | 11
5 | (Belgium) Gilis | 9 | 7 | 3
Semi-finals
1 | (Egypt) Gohar | 11 | 11 | 11
4 | (Egypt) Orfi | 6 | 8 | 2
9/16 | (Malaysia) Subramaniam | 2 | 11 | 7 | 9
4 | (Egypt) Orfi | 11 | 4 | 11 | 11

==== Bottom half ====
First round
3 | (United States) Olivia Weaver
[Bye]
(Egypt) Zeina Mickawy | 12 | 13 | 9 | 8 | 11
(Malaysia) Aifa Azman | 10 | 11 | 11 | 11 | 7
9/16 | (Egypt) Fayrouz Aboelkheir
[Bye]
(Egypt) Hana Ramadan | 11 | 11 | 11
(England) Alicia Mead | 4 | 6 | 7
9/16 | (Egypt) Sana Ibrahim
[Bye]
9/16 | (Egypt) Farida Mohamed
[Bye]
9/16 | (Belgium) Nele Coll
[Bye]
6 | (England) Gina Kennedy
[Bye]
8 | (United States) Amanda Sobhy
[Bye]
(Egypt) Malak Khafagy | 11 | 11 | 9 | 1 | 12
(England) Lucy Beecroft | 9 | 6 | 11 | 11 | 10
(Egypt) Hana Moataz | 13 | 9 | 11 | 5 | 11
(Egypt) Nour Aboulmakarim | 11 | 11 | 6 | 11 | 9
(Wales) Tesni Murphy | 10 | 11 | 11 | 11
(England) Grace Gear | 12 | 3 | 9 | 7
(Malaysia) Ainaa Amani | 6 | 7 | 7
(England) Sarah-Jane Perry | 11 | 11 | 11
9/16 | (Egypt) Salma Hany
[Bye]
(Egypt) Haya Ali | 10 | 11 | 11 | 11
(Egypt) Salma El Tayeb | 12 | 6 | 7 | 8
2 | (Egypt) Nour El Sherbini
[Bye]

Second round
3 | (United States) Weaver | 11 | 11 | 11
(Egypt) Mickawy | 7 | 3 | 7
9/16 | (Egypt) Aboelkheir | 11 | 11 | 6 | 11
(Egypt) Ramadan | 5 | 4 | 11 | 9
9/16 | (Egypt) Ibrahim | 11 | 13 | 4 | 11
9/16 | (Egypt) Mohamed | 9 | 11 | 11 | 9
9/16 | (Belgium) Coll | 11 | 7 | 11 | 11
6 | (England) Kennedy | 7 | 11 | 2 | 1
8 | (United States) Sobhy | 11 | 12 | 11
(Egypt) Khagafy | 5 | 10 | 4
(Egypt) Moataz | 11 | 8 | 8 | 11 | 13
(Wales) Murphy | 4 | 11 | 11 | 7 | 11
(England) Perry | 11 | 9 | 11 | 1 | 11
9/16 | (Egypt) Hany | 7 | 11 | 8 | 11 | 9
9/16 | (Egypt) Ali | 4 | 3 | 1
2 | (Egypt) El Sherbini | 11 | 11 | 11

Third round
3 | (United States) Weaver | 14 | 11 | 11
9/16 | (Egypt) Aboelkheir | 12 | 9 | 4
9/16 | (Egypt) Ibrahim | 10 | 4 | 11 | 9
9/16 | (Belgium) Coll | 12 | 11 | 6 | 11
8 | (United States) Sobhy | 11 | 11 | 11
(Egypt) Moataz | 6 | 8 | 5
(England) Perry | 12 | 3 | 8 | 6 | 3
2 | (Egypt) El Sherbini | 10 | 11 | 11 | 11

Quarter-finals
3 | (United States) Weaver | 12 | 11 | 11
9/16 | (Belgium) Coll | 10 | 8 | 5
Semi-finals
3 | (United States) Weaver | 9 | 8 | 11 | 3
2 | (Egypt) El Sherbini | 11 | 11 | 5 | 11
8 | (United States) Sobhy | 7 | 8 | 7
2 | (Egypt) El Sherbini | 11 | 11 | 11

== See also ==
- 2025 Men's British Open Squash Championship
