= Squash at the 2011 Pan American Games – Women's doubles =

Squash – Women's team at the 2011 Pan American Games
- Venue: Squash Complex
- Dates: October 15–17

Medalists
Gold medal	Nayelly Hernández; Samantha Terán	Mexico
Silver medal	Catalina Peláez; Silvia Angulo	Colombia
Bronze medal	Miranda Ranieri; Stephanie Edmison	Canada
Bronze medal	Olivia Clyne; Maria Ubina	United States

The women's doubles squash event of the 2011 Pan American Games was held on October 15–17 at the Squash Complex in Guadalajara, Mexico.

== Draw ==
Quarterfinals
Peláez (Colombia) S Angulo (COL)	11	11
AM Pinto (Chile) S Pinto (CHI)	4	3
M Ranieri (Canada) S Edmison (CAN)	11	11
M Pontalti (Brazil) T Serafini (BRA)	5	7
F Rocha (Argentina) A Falcione (ARG)	7	5
N Hernández (Mexico) S Terán (MEX)	11	11
P Anckerman (Guatemala) W Bonilla (GUA)	11	7	7
M Ubina (United States) O Clyne (USA)	10	11	11

Semifinals
C Peláez (Colombia) S Angulo (COL)	11	8	11
M Ranieri (Canada) S Edmison (CAN)	7	11	7
N Hernández (Mexico) S Terán (MEX)	11	11
M Ubina (United States) O Clyne (USA)	4	5

Final
C Peláez (Colombia) S Angulo (COL)	8	5
N Hernández (Mexico) S Terán (MEX)	11	11
