= Squash at the 2019 Pan American Games – Mixed doubles =

Squash – Mixed doubles at the 2019 Pan American Games
- Venue: CAR Voleibol en la Videna
- Dates: July 25 – July 28
- Competitors: 14 from 7 nations

Medalists
Gold medal	Catalina Peláez; Miguel Ángel Rodríguez	Colombia
Silver medal	Alfredo Ávila; Diana García	Mexico
Bronze medal	Andrew Schnell; Hollie Naughton	Canada
Bronze medal	Andrew Douglas; Olivia Clyne	United States

The mixed doubles squash event at the 2019 Pan American Games was held from 25 to 28 July at the CAR Voleibol en la Videna in Lima, Peru.

Each National Olympic Committee could enter a maximum of one pair into the competition. The athletes will be drawn into an elimination stage draw. Once a pair lost a match, they will be no longer able to compete. Each match will be contested as the best of three games. This will be the first time the mixed doubles event has been contested at the Pan American Games.

== Results ==
=== Bracket ===
Quarterfinals
Andrew Schnell (CAN); Hollie Naughton (CAN)	11	11
Matías Lacroix Nova (CHI); Camila Gallegos (CHI)	2	4
Andrew Douglas (USA); Olivia Clyne (USA)	11	11
Andrés Duany (PER); María Pía Hermosa (PER)	3	3
Alfredo Ávila (MEX); Diana García (MEX)	11	11
Gonzalo Miranda (ARG); Antonella Falcione (ARG)	2	3

Semifinals
Catalina Peláez (COL); Miguel Ángel Rodríguez (COL)	11	11
Andrew Schnell (CAN); Hollie Naughton (CAN)	10	5
Andrew Douglas (USA); Olivia Clyne (USA)	6	5
Alfredo Ávila (MEX); Diana García (MEX)	11	11

Final
Catalina Peláez (COL); Miguel Ángel Rodríguez (COL)	11	11
Alfredo Ávila (MEX); Diana García (MEX)	10	4
