= Squash at the 2014 Central American and Caribbean Games =

- Venue: Leyes de Reforma Sports Complex
- Location: Veracruz, Mexico
- Dates: 23–29 November

The squash competition at the 2014 Central American and Caribbean Games was held in Veracruz, Mexico.

The tournament was scheduled to be held from 23 to 29 November at the Leyes de Reforma Sports Complex.

== Medal summary ==
=== Men's events ===
Event	Gold	Silver	Bronze
Singles	Miguel Ángel Rodríguez (COL)	César Salazar (MEX)	Lewis Walters (JAM); Arturo Salazar (MEX)
Doubles	Mexico (MEX); César Salazar; Arturo Salazar	Colombia (COL); Juan Camilo Vargas; Andrés Herrera	El Salvador (ESA); Israel Abrego; Jose Ernesto Molina; Guatemala (GUA); Josué Enríquez; Antonio de la Torre
Team	Mexico (MEX); César Salazar; Arturo Salazar; Alfredo Ávila	Colombia (COL); Miguel Ángel Rodríguez; Andrés Herrera; Juan Camilo Vargas	Guatemala (GUA); Josué Enríquez; Antonio de la Torre; Bryan Bonilla; Jamaica (JAM); Lewis Walters; Christopher Binnie; Bruce Burrowes

=== Women's events ===
Event	Gold	Silver	Bronze
Singles	Samantha Terán (MEX)	Laura Tovar (COL)	Catalina Peláez (COL); Diana García (MEX)
Doubles	Mexico (MEX); Samantha Terán; Karla Urrutia	Colombia (COL); Laura Tovar; Karol González	Guatemala (GUA); Pamela Anckermann; Winifer Bonilla; Guyana (GUY); Ashley de Groot; Ashley Khalil
Team	Mexico (MEX); Samantha Terán; Diana García; Karla Urrutia	Colombia (COL); Catalina Peláez; Laura Tovar; Karol González	Guatemala (GUA); Winifer Bonilla; Pamela Anckermann; Nicolle Anckerman; Guyana (GUY); Ashley Khalil; Mary Fung-A-Fat; Ashley de Groot

=== Mixed event ===
Event	Gold	Silver	Bronze
Doubles	Cayman Islands (CAY); Cameron Stafford; Marlene West	Mexico (MEX); Diana García; Alfredo Ávila	Barbados (BAR); Karen Meakins; Gavin Cumberbatch; Colombia (COL); Miguel Ángel Rodríguez; Catalina Peláez

== Medal table ==
* Host nation (Mexico)

Rank	Nation	Gold	Silver	Bronze	Total
1	Mexico*	5	2	2	9
2	Colombia	1	5	2	8
3	Cayman Islands	1	0	0	1
4	Guatemala	0	0	4	4
5	Guyana	0	0	2	2
5	Jamaica	0	0	2	2
7	Barbados	0	0	1	1
7	El Salvador	0	0	1	1
Totals (8 entries)		7	7	14	28
