= Squash at the 2023 Pan American Games – Mixed doubles =

Mixed doubles at the 2023 Pan American Games
- Venue: Racket Sports Center
- Dates: November 2 - November 3
- Competitors: 12 from 6 nations

Medalists
Gold medal	Timothy Brownell; Olivia Clyne	United States
Silver medal	George Crowne; Nicole Bunyan	Canada
Bronze medal	Luis Quisquinay; Tabita Gaitán	Independent Athletes Team
Bronze medal	Catalina Peláez; Miguel Ángel Rodríguez	Colombia

The men's doubles competition of the squash events at the 2023 Pan American Games was held from November 2 to November 3 at the Racquet Sports Center (Centro de Entrenamiento del Tenis y Deportes de Raqueta) in Santiago, Chile.

== Format ==
Each National Olympic Committee could enter a maximum of one pair of athletes into the competition. The athletes were drawn into an elimination stage draw. Once a pair loses a match, they will be no longer able to compete. Each match will be contested as the best of three games. Unlike other events, there is no bronze medal match, so the two pairs that do not win during the semifinals receive a bronze medal.

== Schedule ==
Date	Time	Round
November 2, 2023	09:00	Quarterfinals
November 2, 2023	15:30	Semifinals
November 3, 2023	17:00	Final

== Results ==
The results were as follows

Quarterfinals				Semifinals				Final
				George Crowne (CAN); Nicole Bunyan (CAN)	11	11
Agustín Carranza (CHI); Antonia Vera (CHI)	10	8		Luis Quisquinay (EAI); Tabita Gaitán (EAI)	8	9
Luis Quisquinay (EAI); Tabita Gaitan (EAI)	11	11						George Crowne (CAN); Nicole Bunyan (CAN)	6	11	6
Arturo Salazar (MEX); Diana García (MEX)	11	10	7					Timothy Brownell (USA); Olivia Clyne (USA)	11	10	11
Timothy Brownell (USA); Olivia Clyne (USA)	8	11	11	Timothy Brownell (USA); Olivia Clyne (USA)	10	11	11
				Catalina Peláez (COL); Miguel Ángel Rodríguez (COL)	11	2	5
