= Silvia Angulo =

Colombian squash player (born 1983)

Silvia Angúlo Rugeles
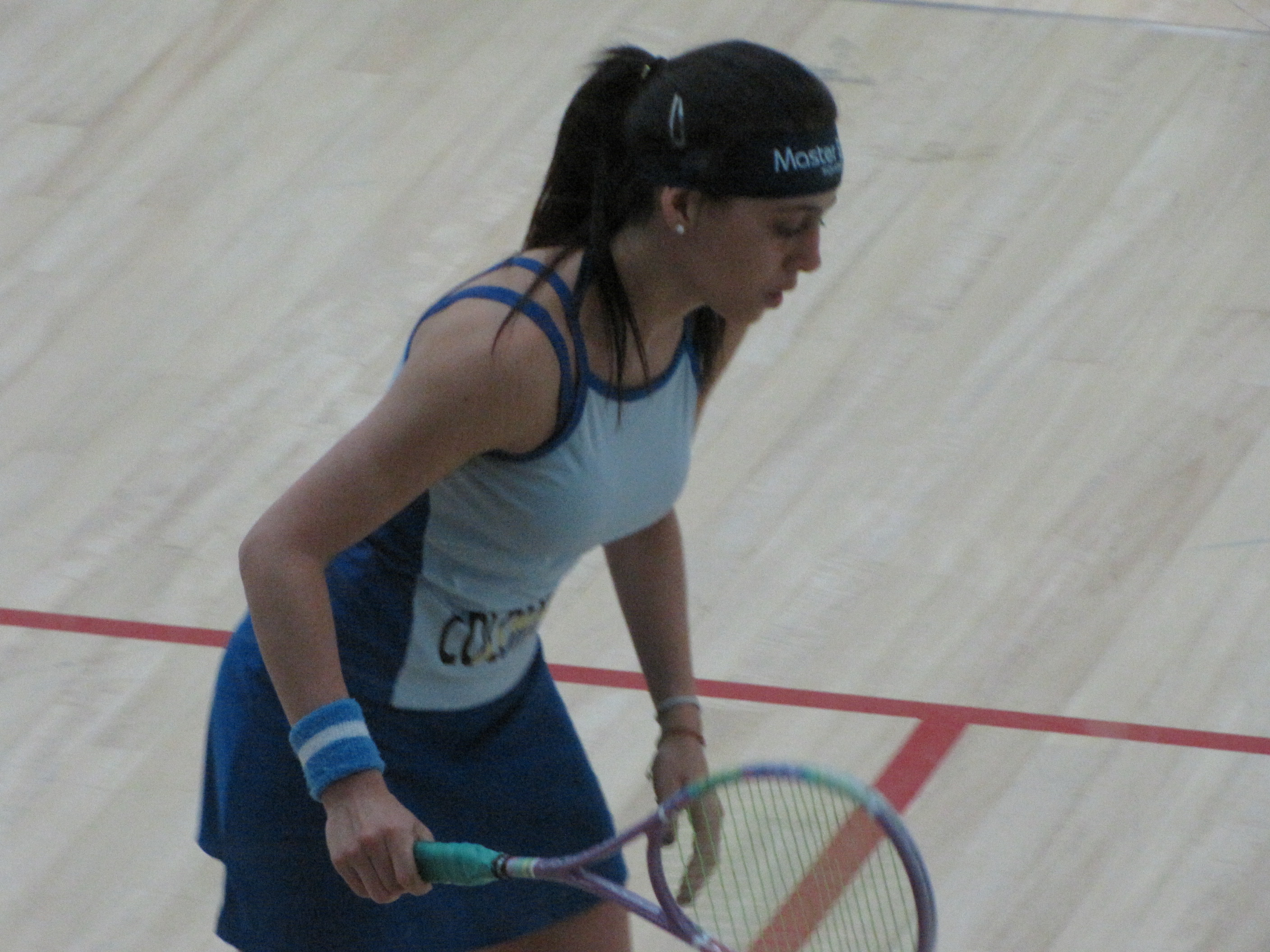
- Silvia Angúlo in 2010

Personal information
- Born: September 14, 1983 (age 42) Bucaramanga, Colombia

Sport
- Country: Colombia
- Handedness: Right Handed
- Racquet used: Tecnifibre

Women's singles
- Highest ranking: 66 (March 2007)
Medal record
Representing Colombia
Women's squash
Pan American Games
Silver medal – second place	2011 Guadalajara	Doubles
Silver medal – second place	2011 Guadalajara	Team
Bronze medal – third place	2007 Rio de Janeiro	Team
Pan American Championships
Gold medal – first place	2008 Cuenca	Singles
Gold medal – first place	2010 Guatemala City	Doubles
Bronze medal – third place	2025 Rio de Janeiro	Team
Bronze medal – third place	2026 Asunción	Team
Central American and Caribbean Games
Gold medal – first place	2010 Mayagüez	Doubles
Silver medal – second place	2006 Cartagena	Team
Silver medal – second place	2010 Mayagüez	Team
Bronze medal – third place	2006 Cartagena	Singles
Bronze medal – third place	2006 Cartagena	Doubles
Bronze medal – third place	2010 Mayagüez	Mixed doubles
South American Games
Gold medal – first place	2010 Medellín	Doubles
Gold medal – first place	2010 Medellín	Team
Silver medal – second place	2010 Medellín	Singles
Bolivarian Games
Gold medal – first place	2025 Lima-Ayacucho	Team
- Updated on 18 February 2026

Silvia Angúlo Rugeles (born September 14, 1983, in Bucaramanga) is a Colombian squash player. She won gold medals in the 2010 South American Games and 2010 Central American and Caribbean Games. She achieved her highest world ranking of 66 in March 2007.

== Squash titles ==
Angúlo won gold in women's singles at the National Games of Colombia in 2004. She joined the Professional Squash Association in 2005. At the 2007 Pan American Games, she won a bronze medal as part of the Colombian women's squash team alongside María Isabel Restrepo and Catalina Peláez. She won a gold meal for women's singles at the 2008 Pan American Squash Championships in Ecuador.

In 2010, she won a gold medal with Pelaez in women's doubles at the Central American and Caribbean Games.

In 2011, she won silver in women's doubles at the 2011 Pan American Games.
