= Stephanie Edmison =

Canadian squash player (born 1987)

Personal information
- Born: July 12, 1987 (age 39) Toronto, Ontario

Sport
- Country: Canada
- Handedness: Right Handed
- Coached by: Shauna Flath & Jonathon Power
- Retired: January 2013
- Racquet used: Dunlop

Women's singles
- Highest ranking: No. 63 (April 2012)
Medal record
Women's Squash
Representing Canada
Pan American Games
Gold medal – first place	2011 Guadalajara	Team
Bronze medal – third place	2011 Guadalajara	Doubles
- Updated on June 2020

Stephanie Edmison (born July 12, 1987) is a Canadian professional squash player. She reached a career-high PSA ranking of World No. 63 in April 2012. She won two medals at the 2011 Pan American Games, a gold in the team event and a bronze in the doubles event with Miranda Ranieri. She retired as a professional player in January 2013.
