= Squash at the 2010 South American Games =

- Dates: March 20–25

There were seven squash events at the 2010 South American Games. The events were held over March 20–25.

== Medal table ==
Rank	Nation	Gold	Silver	Bronze	Total
1	Colombia (COL)	6	1	1	8
2	Guyana (GUY)	1	0	2	3
3	Argentina (ARG)	0	3	4	7
4	Brazil (BRA)	0	3	3	6
5	Ecuador (ECU)	0	0	2	2
5	Paraguay (PAR)	0	0	2	2
Totals (6 entries)		7	7	14	28

== Medalists ==
Event	Gold	Silver	Bronze
Men's events
Men's singles	Miguel Ángel Rodríguez; Colombia	Rafael Alarçón; Brazil	Bernardo Samper; Colombia; Esteban Casarino; Paraguay
Men's doubles	Bernardo Samper; Javier Castilla; Colombia	Guillermo Asdeale; Hernán D'Arcangelo; Argentina	Ronivaldo Conceição; Vinicius Costa; Brazil; Bruno Alvarenga; Esteban Casarino; Paraguay
Men's team	Javier Castilla; Erick Herrera; Miguel Ángel Rodríguez; Bernardo Samper; Colombia	Rafael Alarçón; Ronivaldo Conceição; Vinicius Costa; Brazil	Ernesto Davila; Juan Sebastian Chacon; Alex Ulloa; Ecuador; Hernán D'Arcangelo; Guillermo Asdeale; Gonzalo Miranda; Argentina
Women's events
Women's singles	Nicolette Fernandes; Guyana	Silvia Angulo; Colombia	Cecilia Cerquetti; Argentina; Antonella Falcione; Argentina
Women's doubles	Silvia Angulo; Catalina Peláez; Colombia	Cecilia Cerquetti; Antonella Falcione; Argentina	Nicolette Fernandes; Ashley Khalil; Guyana; Tatiana Borges; Thaisa Serafini; Brazil
Women's team	Silvia Angulo; Karol González; Catalina Peláez; Colombia	Tatiana Borges; Karen Redfern; Thaisa Serafini; Brazil	Sofia Baravalle; Cecilia Cerquetti; Antonella Falcione; Argentina; Nicolette Fernandes; Ashley Khalil; Guyana
Mixed events
Mixed doubles	Anna Porras; Miguel Ángel Rodríguez; Colombia	Antonella Falcione; Matias Valenzuela; Argentina	Ernesto Davila; Magaly Velez; Ecuador; Rafael Alarçón; Karen Redfern; Brazil
