= Nikki Todd =

Canadian squash player (born 1990)

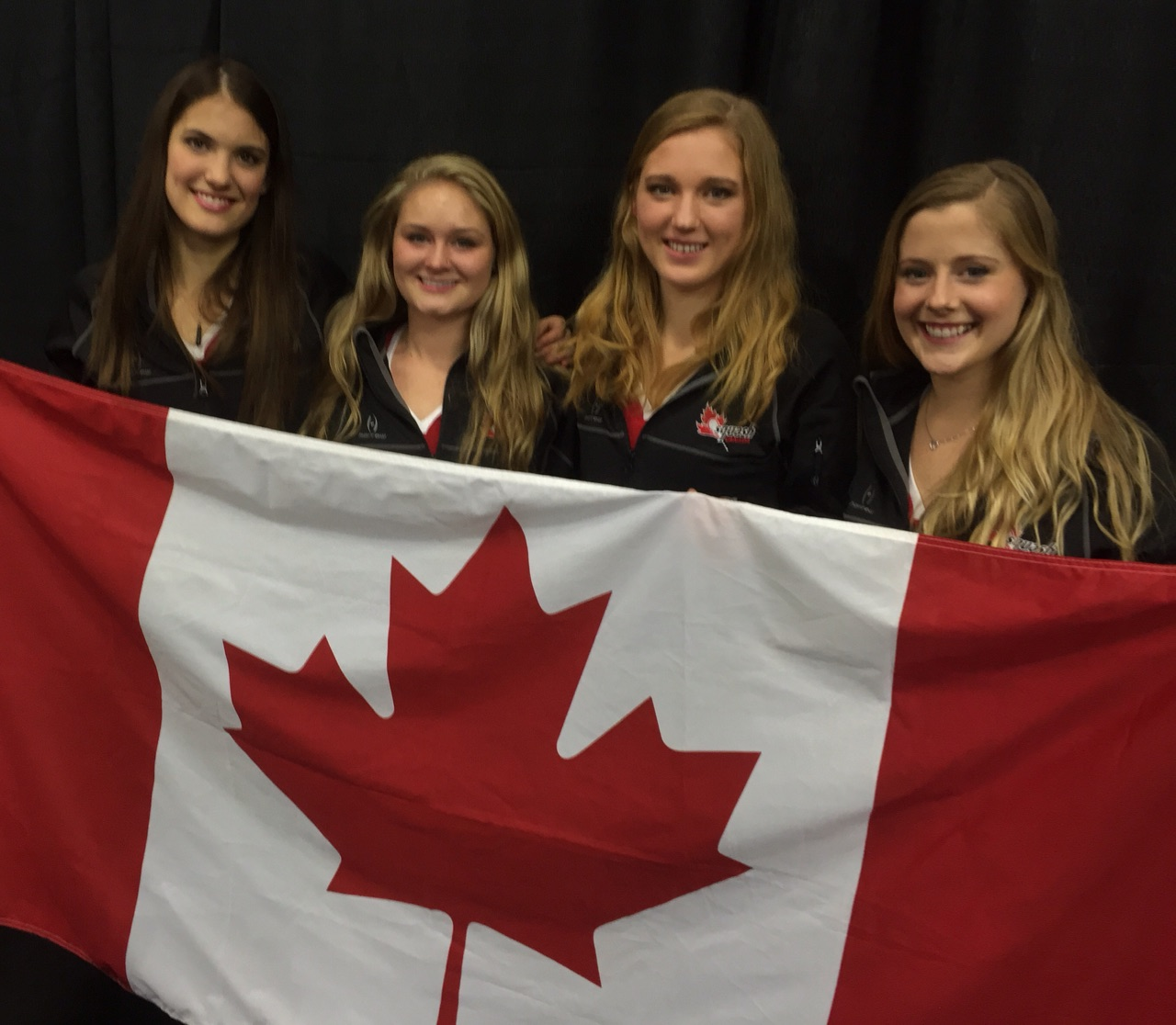

Personal information
- Born: July 7, 1990 (age 36) Regina, Saskatchewan, Canada

Sport
- Country: Canada
- Turned pro: 2010
- Retired: Active

Women's singles
- Highest ranking: No. 49 (April 2018)
- Current ranking: No. 288 (February 2026)
- Title: 3
Medal record
Women's squash
Representing Canada
Pan American Games
Silver medal – second place	2015 Toronto	Doubles
Silver medal – second place	2015 Toronto	Team
Silver medal – second place	2023 Santiago	Team

Nikki Todd (born July 7, 1990) is a Canadian professional squash player. She reached a career-high world ranking of World No. 49 in April 2018.

== Biography ==
In January 2018, Todd was named to Canada's 2018 Commonwealth Games team, where she and her women's doubles event partner Samantha Cornett were defeated in the quarterfinals by the eventual runners-up Indian team.

In February 2026, she won her third PSA title after securing victory in the Granite Challenger during the 2025–26 PSA Squash Tour.
