= Squash at the 2010 Central American and Caribbean Games =

Event held in Mayagüez, Puerto Rico

- Location: Mayagüez
- Dates: 18–25 July

The Squash competition at the 2010 Central American and Caribbean Games was held in Mayagüez, Puerto Rico.

The tournament was scheduled to be held from 18 to 25 July at the Bogotá in Colombia.

== Medal summary ==
=== Men's events ===
Event	Gold	Silver	Bronze
Individual	Miguel Ángel Rodríguez (COL)	César Salazar (MEX)	Christopher Binnie (JAM); Eric Gálvez (MEX)
Doubles	Mexico	Colombia	Cayman Islands; El Salvador
Team	Mexico	Colombia	Guatemala

=== Women's events ===
Event	Gold	Silver	Bronze
Individual	Samantha Terán (MEX)	Karen Meakins (BAR)	Nicolette Fernandes (GUY); Catalina Peláez (COL)
Doubles	Colombia	Guyana	Guatemala; El Salvador
Team	Mexico	Colombia	Guyana

=== Mixed event ===
Event	Gold	Silver	Bronze
Doubles	Mexico	Trinidad and Tobago Colin Ramasra and Kerrie Sample	Colombia; Jamaica
