= Hernán D'Arcangelo =

Argentine squash player

Personal information
- Born: November 17, 1980 (age 45) Córdoba, Argentina
- Height: 1.88 m (6 ft 2 in)
- Weight: 87 kg (192 lb)

Sport
- Country: Argentina
- Turned pro: 2001
- Retired: Active
- Racquet used: Head

Men's singles
- Highest ranking: No. 98 (May, 2013)
- Current ranking: No. 102 (June, 2013)
Medal record
Men's squash
Representing Argentina
South American Games
Silver medal – second place	2010 Medellín	Doubles
Bronze medal – third place	2010 Medellín	Team
- Updated on June, 2013

Hernán D'Arcangelo (born November 11, 1980) is a professional squash player who represents Argentina. He reached a career-high world ranking of World No. 98 in May 2013. Hernán won the bronze medal at the 2011 Pan American Games. His sister is Celeste D'Arcangelo, an Argentine rhythmic gymnast who has qualified for the YOG Buenos Aires 2018.
