= Nayelly Hernández =

Mexican squash player (born 1986)

Personal information
- Born: 23 February 1986 (age 40) San Luis Potosí City
- Years active: 2006-2016

Sport
- Country: Mexico
- Handedness: right-handed
- Retired: Yes
- Racquet used: Dunlop

women's singles
- Highest ranking: 57 (October 2011)
Medal record
Representing Mexico
Women's squash
Central American and Caribbean Games
Gold medal – first place	2006 Cartagena	team
Pan American Games
Gold medal – first place	2011 Guadalajara	doubles
Bronze medal – third place	2007 Rio de Janeiro	team
Bronze medal – third place	2011 Guadalajara	team

Nayelly Hernández (born 23 February 1986) is a Mexican former professional squash player. She has represented Mexico internationally in several international competitions including the Central American and Caribbean Games, Pan American Games, Women's World Team Squash Championships. Nayelly achieved her highest career ranking of 57 in October 2011 during the 2011 PSA World Tour. Her husband Chris Walker is also a professional squash player, who represents England. She joined the Trinity College in 2008 as the first Mexican female to join a US college for squash and graduated in 2010.

== Career ==
Nayelly joined PSA in 2006 and took part in the PSA World Tour until 2016, the 2015-16 PSA World Tour was her last World Tour prior to her retirement.

Nayelly Hernandez represented Mexico at the 2007 Pan American Games and claimed a bronze medal as a part of the team event on her maiden appearance at the Pan American Games. In the 2011 Pan American Games she clinched gold in the women's doubles event along with Samantha Teran and settled for bronze in the team event. She has also participated at the Women's World Team Squash Championships on four occasions in 2010, 2012, 2014 and in 2016.
