= Nicole Bunyan =

Canadian professional squash player

Personal information
- Born: November 22, 1993 (age 32) Victoria, BC, Canada

Sport
- Country: Canada
- Handedness: Right Handed
- Retired: Active
- Racquet used: Harrow

Women's singles
- Highest ranking: No. 39 (October 2022)
- Current ranking: No. 50 (December 2022)
Medal record
Representing Canada
Women's squash
Pan American Games
Silver medal – second place	2023 Santiago	Team
Silver medal – second place	2023 Santiago	Mixed doubles
- Updated on February, 2018

Nicole Bunyan (born 22 November 1993 in Victoria, BC) is a Canadian professional squash player. As of October 2022, she was ranked number 39 in the world.

In June 2022, Bunyan was named to Canada's 2022 Commonwealth Games team.
