= Squash at the 2011 Pan American Games =

- Venue: Squash Complex
- Dates: October 15–20
- Competitors: 60 from 14 nations

Squash competitions at the 2011 Pan American Games in Guadalajara were held from October 15 to October 20 at the Squash Complex.

== Medal summary ==
=== Medal table ===
| Rank | Nation | Gold | Silver | Bronze | Total |
|---|---|---|---|---|---|
| 1 | Mexico | 4 | 1 | 2 | 7 |
| 2 | Canada | 1 | 2 | 3 | 6 |
| 3 | Colombia | 1 | 2 | 0 | 3 |
| 4 | United States | 0 | 1 | 3 | 4 |
| 5 | Argentina | 0 | 0 | 1 | 1 |
| 5 | Brazil | 0 | 0 | 1 | 1 |
| 5 | Guyana | 0 | 0 | 1 | 1 |
| 5 | Paraguay | 0 | 0 | 1 | 1 |
| Totals (8 entries) | | 6 | 6 | 12 | 24 |

=== Events ===
==== Men's events ====
| Event | Gold | Silver | Bronze |
|---|---|---|---|
| Men's singles | Miguel Ángel Rodríguez; Colombia | César Salazar; Mexico | Shawn Delierre; Canada |
| Men's singles | Miguel Ángel Rodríguez; Colombia | César Salazar; Mexico | Arturo Salazar; Mexico |
| Men's doubles | Mexico; Arturo Salazar; Eric Gálvez | United States; Christopher Gordon; Julian Illingworth | Paraguay; Esteban Casarino; Nicolas Caballero |
| Men's doubles | Mexico; Arturo Salazar; Eric Gálvez | United States; Christopher Gordon; Julian Illingworth | Argentina; Hernán D'Arcangelo; Robertino Pezzota |
| Men's team | Mexico; Arturo Salazar; Eric Gálvez; César Salazar | Canada; Shawn Delierre; Andrew Schnell; Shahier Razik | Brazil; Vinicius De Lima; Vinicius Rodrigues; Rafael Fernandes |
| Men's team | Mexico; Arturo Salazar; Eric Gálvez; César Salazar | Canada; Shawn Delierre; Andrew Schnell; Shahier Razik | United States; Julian Illingworth; Christopher Gordon; Graham Bassett |

==== Women's events ====
| Event | Gold | Silver | Bronze |
|---|---|---|---|
| Women's singles | Samantha Terán; Mexico | Samantha Cornett; Canada | Miranda Ranieri; Canada |
| Women's singles | Samantha Terán; Mexico | Samantha Cornett; Canada | Nicolette Fernandes; Guyana |
| Women's doubles | Mexico; Nayelly Hernández; Samantha Terán | Colombia; Catalina Peláez; Silvia Angulo | Canada; Miranda Ranieri; Stephanie Edmison |
| Women's doubles | Mexico; Nayelly Hernández; Samantha Terán | Colombia; Catalina Peláez; Silvia Angulo | United States; Olivia Clyne; Maria Ubina |
| Women's team | Canada; Miranda Ranieri; Samantha Cornett; Stephanie Edmison | Colombia; Silvia Angulo; Catalina Peláez; Anna Porras | Mexico; Nayelly Hernández; Samantha Terán; Imelda Salazar |
| Women's team | Canada; Miranda Ranieri; Samantha Cornett; Stephanie Edmison | Colombia; Silvia Angulo; Catalina Peláez; Anna Porras | United States; Olivia Clyne; Maria Ubina; Lily Lorentzen |

== Qualification ==
The qualifying competition took place at the 2010 Pan American Championship in Guatemala City, Guatemala. A maximum of 60 athletes (35 male and 25 female) took part in the squash competition. Each nation could enter a maximum of three male and female athletes, for a total of six athletes. Of these athletes, two competed in the individual events per gender, one pair competed in doubles per gender, and three competed in a team in the team event per gender. The top seven nations at the 2010 Pan American Squash Championship could qualify for women's teams, while the top ten nations could qualify for men's teams. Mexico qualified for both a men's and women's team as the host nation. Outside of this, athletes could qualify individually, with a maximum of one female and two male athletes qualifying individually.
