= Karen Anderson (squash player) =

Jamaican squash player (born 1971)

Karen Anderson (born 22 January 1971, in Kingston) is a professional female squash player who represented Jamaica during her career. She reached a career-high world ranking of World No. 94 in December 2005 after having joined the Women's International Squash Players Association in the same year.

In May 2013, Anderson was appointed general manager of the Jamaica Netball Association. She had captained her high school netball team. During the 1990s, she had also played netball for Air Jamaica in a business house competitions.

== Career, rankings, championships and trophies ==
- 1981: National and Caribbean Junior Representative
- 1986: National U17 Junior Champion
- 1987: National Ladies Champion and National U19 Girls Champion

- National Senior Team Representative at Caribbean Championships

- 1988: Runner-up National Ladies Champion

- National U19 Girls Champion

- 1989: National Ladies Champion

- National U19 Girls Champion
- Caribbean U19 Girls Champion

- 1990-1995: National Senior Team Representative at Caribbean Championships
- 1999: PanAm Games Winnipeg Team Member
- 2000-2001: Milex Liguanea Open Champion
- 2000-2003: National Ladies Champion
- 2001: Ranked #3 in Caribbean
- 2002: Commonwealth Games Manchester, England Team Member

- Plate Competition Runner-up

- 2002: CAC Games El Salvador - Silver Medalist Team Competition

- CAC Games El Salvador - Bronze Medalist Mixed Doubles

- 2002: Started coaching part-time
- 2003: PanAm Games Dominican Republic team member
- 2003: Coaching full-time
- 2004: Coaching Certification Technical Component
- 2004: 3rd Place Trident Barbados Open
- 2004: Coached Jamaica's Junior Elite Squad
- 2005: Caribbee/Playfair Barbados Open Champion
- 2005: Attained B2 Referee Certification (Squash Canada)
- 2005: St. Lucia Open Runner-Up
- 2005-2009: National Ladies Champion
- 2005: Ranked #3 in Caribbean
- 2005: Ranked #95 in the World
- 2006: Silver Medallist Ladies Doubles CAC Games

- Bronze Medallist Ladies Singles CAC Games

- 2006: Named National Junior Coach for Junior Caribbean Squash Championships
- 2006: Refereed at the Women's World Team Championships
- 2007: Caribbean Ladies Champion
- 2007: Retired from competitive play after the Caribbean Championships
  - 2007–present: National Junior Coach
- 2010: Selected as referee for the Commonwealth Games 2010
