= Samantha Cornett =

Canadian squash player (born 1991)

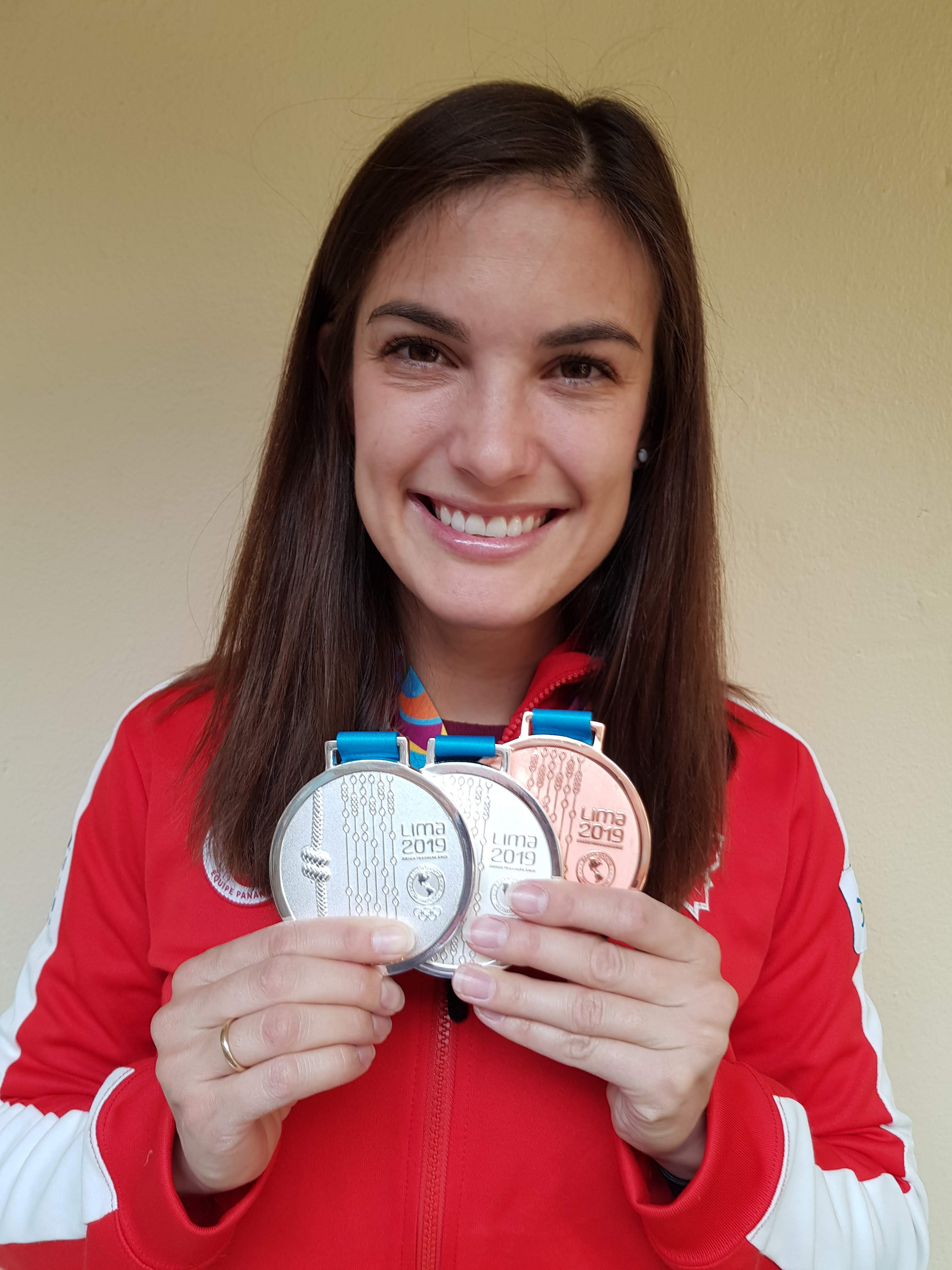
- Samantha Cornett, Lima 2019 Pan Am Games

Personal information
- Born: February 4, 1991 (age 35) Deep River, Ontario, Canada
- Height: 177 cm (5 ft 10 in)
- Weight: 68 kg (150 lb)

Sport
- Country: Canada
- Handedness: Right Handed
- Turned pro: 2007
- Coached by: Heather Wallace & Jessica Di Mauro
- Retired: 2020
- Racquet used: Harrow

Women's singles
- Highest ranking: No. 23 (February, 2018)
- Title: 13
- Tour final: 21
Medal record
Women's Squash
Representing Canada
Pan American Games
Gold medal – first place	2011 Guadalajara	Team
Silver medal – second place	2011 Guadalajara	Singles
Silver medal – second place	2015 Toronto	Doubles
Silver medal – second place	2015 Toronto	Team
Silver medal – second place	2019 Lima	Doubles
Silver medal – second place	2019 Lima	Team
Bronze medal – third place	2015 Toronto	Singles
Bronze medal – third place	2019 Lima	Singles
- Updated on April, 2020

Samantha Jean Lardner Cornett (born February 4, 1991) is a Canadian retired professional squash player. She is from Deep River, Ontario. She reached a career-high world ranking of World No. 23 in February 2018. She has won 4 Canadian National Championships, in 2013, 2014, 2015, and 2019. She won two medals at the 2011 Pan American Games, a gold in the team event alongside Miranda Ranieri, & Stephanie Edmison, and a silver in the singles event. Cornett later won three medals at the 2015 Pan American Games held in Toronto, and three medals at the 2019 Pan American Games held in Lima.

In January 2018, Cornett was named to Canada's 2018 Commonwealth Games team. In April 2020, she retired from professional squash.
