= Nicolette Fernandes =

Guyanese squash player

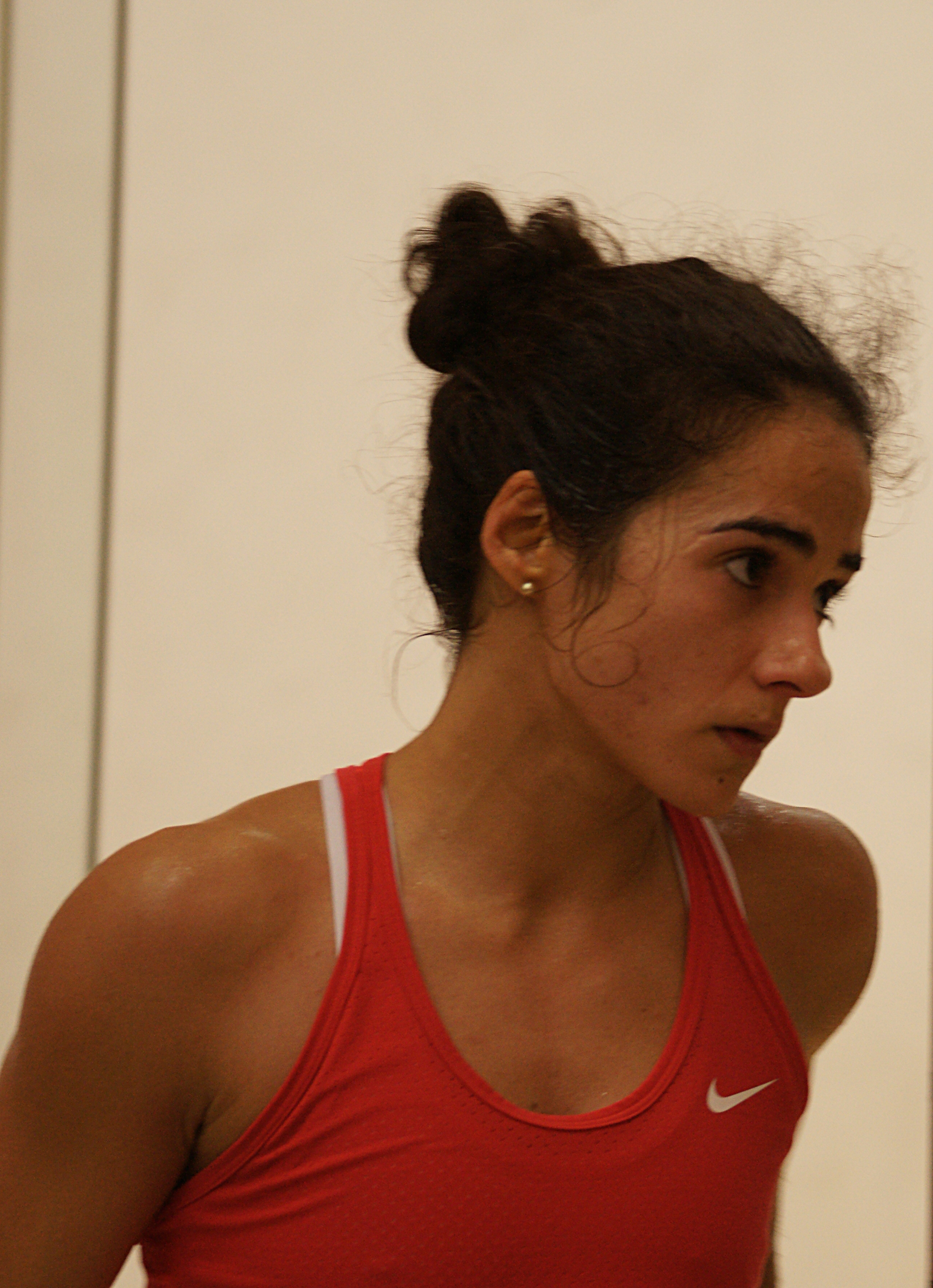
- Nicolette Fernandes, Monte-Carlo squash classic 2015

Personal information
- Born: June 19, 1983 (age 43) Toronto, Ontario, Canada

Sport
- Country: Guyana
- Handedness: Right Handed
- Turned pro: 2003
- Coached by: Carl Ince
- Retired: Active
- Racquet used: Tecnifibre

Women's singles
- Highest ranking: No. 19 (October, 2013)
- Current ranking: Retired
- Title: 1
- Tour final: 3
Medal record
Women's Squash
Representing Guyana
Central American and Caribbean Games
Silver medal – second place	2002 San Salvador	Mixed Doubles
Bronze medal – third place	2002 San Salvador	Singles
Bronze medal – third place	2002 San Salvador	Doubles
Bronze medal – third place	2002 San Salvador	Team
Gold medal – first place	2006 Cartagena	Singles
Silver medal – second place	2006 Cartagena	Mixed Doubles
Silver medal – second place	2010 Mayagüez	Doubles
Bronze medal – third place	2010 Mayagüez	Singles
Bronze medal – third place	2010 Mayagüez	Team
South American Games
Gold medal – first place	2010 Medellín	Singles
Bronze medal – third place	2010 Medellín	Doubles
Bronze medal – third place	2010 Medellín	Team
Pan American Games
Bronze medal – third place	2011 Guadalajara	Singles
- Updated on October, 2016

Nicolette Fernandes (born 19 June 1983) is a former professional squash player who represented Guyana internationally. She is one of the country’s most accomplished athletes, having achieved success at regional, international, and masters levels.

Fernandes won multiple major titles during her career, including Pan American and South American championships. She also secured Guyana’s only gold medal at the 2006 Central American and Caribbean Games in Colombia, defeating Samantha Terán in a five-set final.

In 2007, Fernandes suffered a serious knee injury that sidelined her from competition for 23 months, interrupting her professional career. She later returned to competitive play and achieved a career-high world ranking of No. 19 in October 2013. In 2010, she appeared in the WISPA calendar, which featured leading women’s squash players.

On 28 August 2022, Fernandes became the first Guyanese athlete to win a World Masters Championship, winning a gold medal in the 35+ category at the championships in Poland. She won a second World Masters gold medal two years later in the Over 40 category.

In 2025, Fernandes received her eighth National Sportswoman of the Year award, making her the most decorated female athlete in Guyana’s sporting history. In October 2025, Fernandes was inducted into the inaugural Guyana Squash Association Hall of Fame, recognising her contributions to the sport. She also received an honorary doctorate from the University of Guyana, becoming the first woman to be awarded the honour for sporting achievement.

She is of Portuguese descent.

Her cousin Taylor Fernandes is also a squash player.

== Career statistics ==
Listed as the following:

=== Professional Tour titles (1) ===
All Results for Nicolette Fernandes in WISPA World's Tour tournament

Legend WISPA Platinum Series (0) WISPA Gold Series (0) WISPA Silver Series (0) WISPA Tour Series (1)	Titles by Major Tournaments World Open (0) British Open (0) Hong Kong Open (0) Qatar Classic (0)

No.	Date	Tournament	Opponent in Final	Score in Final
1.	December 5, 2009	Greek Open	(Egypt) Farah Abdel Meguid	11–7, 11–2, 6–11, 11–5

=== WISPA Tour finals (Runner-up) (1) ===
No.	Date	Tournament	Opponent in Final	Score in Final
1.	March 22, 2009	Swiss Open	(France) Camille Serme	8–11, 11–5, 14–12, 12–10

August 28, 2022 World Masters Squash Championship, Gold Medal

== See also ==
- Official Women's Squash World Ranking
- WISPA Awards

Awards and achievements
Preceded by Alison Waters	WISPA Most Improved Player of the Year; 2006	Succeeded by Shelley Kitchen
