= Miranda Ranieri =

Canadian squash player (born 1986)

Personal information
- Born: 20 April 1986 (age 40) Toronto, Ontario

Sport
- Country: Canada
- Handedness: Right Handed
- Turned pro: 2008
- Coached by: Jonathon Power
- Retired: 2013
- Racquet used: Prince

Women's singles
- Highest ranking: No. 43 (May, 2012)
Medal record
Women's Squash
Representing Canada
Pan American Games
Gold medal – first place	2011 Guadalajara	Team
Bronze medal – third place	2011 Guadalajara	Singles
Bronze medal – third place	2011 Guadalajara	Doubles
- Updated on January 7, 2012

Miranda Ranieri (born 20 April 1986 in Toronto, Ontario) is a Canadian professional squash player. She reached a career-high world ranking of World No. 43 in May 2012. She won three medals at the 2011 Pan American Games, a gold in the team event and two bronzes in the singles and doubles.

On the eve of her retirement, she planned to stay involved in squash as a coach and recreational player.
