= Karla Urrutia =

Mexican squash player (born 1994)

Personal information
- Full name: Karla Eva Urrutia Gómez
- Born: April 10, 1994 (age 32) Uruapan, Michoacán, Mexico
- Height: 1.55 m (5 ft 1 in)

Sport
- Sport: Squash
Medal record
Women's Squash
Representing Mexico
Central American and Caribbean Games
Gold medal – first place	2014 Veracruz	Doubles
Gold medal – first place	2014 Veracruz	Team
Pan American Games
Bronze medal – third place	2015 Toronto	Doubles
Bronze medal – third place	2015 Toronto	Team
- Updated on 29 July 2015

Karla Eva Urrutia Gómez (born 10 April 1994 in Uruapan, Michoacán) is a professional female squash player from Mexico who has won multiple medals representing her country at the Central American and Caribbean Games and at the Pan American Games.
