= Catalina Peláez =

Colombian squash player (born 1991)

Personal information
- Born: September 4, 1991 (age 34) Bogotá, Colombia

Sport
- Country: Colombia
- Handedness: Right Handed
- Turned pro: 2005
- Coached by: Ángel Rodríguez
- Retired: Active
- Racquet used: Black Knight

Women's singles
- Highest ranking: No. 56 (October 2015)
- Current ranking: No. 125 (August 2025)
- Title: 1
- Tour final: 3
Medal record
Representing Colombia
Women's squash
Event	1st	2nd	3rd
World Doubles Championships	0	0	1
Pan American Games	1	2	6
Pan American Championships	5	4	7
CAC Games	1	5	5
South American Games	5	0	0
Bolivarian Games	3	0	0
Total	15	11	19
World Doubles Championships
Bronze medal – third place	2019 Carrara	Mixed doubles
Pan American Games
Gold medal – first place	2019 Lima	Mixed doubles
Silver medal – second place	2011 Guadalajara	Doubles
Silver medal – second place	2011 Guadalajara	Team
Bronze medal – third place	2007 Rio de Janeiro	Team
Bronze medal – third place	2015 Toronto	Doubles
Bronze medal – third place	2015 Toronto	Team
Bronze medal – third place	2019 Lima	Team
Bronze medal – third place	2023 Santiago	Mixed doubles
Bronze medal – third place	2023 Santiago	Team
Pan American Championships
Gold medal – first place	2010 Guatemala City	Doubles
Gold medal – first place	2013 Buenos Aires	Mixed doubles
Gold medal – first place	2014 Toluca	Mixed doubles
Gold medal – first place	2018 George Town	Mixed doubles
Gold medal – first place	2024 Lima	Doubles
Silver medal – second place	2016 Hartford	Mixed doubles
Silver medal – second place	2017 Buenos Aires	Team
Silver medal – second place	2023 Cartagena	Mixed doubles
Silver medal – second place	2024 Lima	Team
Bronze medal – third place	2013 Buenos Aires	Team
Bronze medal – third place	2016 Hartford	Singles
Bronze medal – third place	2016 Hartford	Team
Bronze medal – third place	2017 Buenos Aires	Mixed doubles
Bronze medal – third place	2018 George Town	Team
Bronze medal – third place	2023 Cartagena	Team
Bronze medal – third place	2024 Lima	Singles
Central American and Caribbean Games
Gold medal – first place	2010 Mayagüez	Doubles
Silver medal – second place	2006 Cartagena	Team
Silver medal – second place	2010 Mayagüez	Team
Silver medal – second place	2014 Veracruz	Team
Silver medal – second place	2018 Barranquilla	Mixed doubles
Silver medal – second place	2018 Barranquilla	Team
Bronze medal – third place	2006 Cartagena	Doubles
Bronze medal – third place	2010 Mayagüez	Singles
Bronze medal – third place	2014 Veracruz	Singles
Bronze medal – third place	2014 Veracruz	Mixed doubles
Bronze medal – third place	2018 Barranquilla	Singles
South American Games
Gold medal – first place	2010 Medellín	Doubles
Gold medal – first place	2010 Medellín	Team
Gold medal – first place	2018 Cochabamba	Singles
Gold medal – first place	2018 Cochabamba	Mixed doubles
Gold medal – first place	2018 Cochabamba	Team
Bolivarian Games
Gold medal – first place	2017 Santa Marta	Singles
Gold medal – first place	2017 Santa Marta	Mixed doubles
Gold medal – first place	2017 Santa Marta	Team

Catalina Peláez (born September 4, 1991, in Bogotá) is a professional squash player who represents Colombia. She reached a career-high world ranking of World No. 56 in October 2015.

In 2003, she was injured in a car bomb explosion at Club El Nogal in the Colombian armed conflict. Her injuries prevented her from walking for about two months, and from playing squash for about five months. She has spoken of how all she could think of was to get better to be able to return to sports. "Sports was my motivation and my salvation during those hard times."
