= Enercare Centre =

Exhibition complex in Toronto

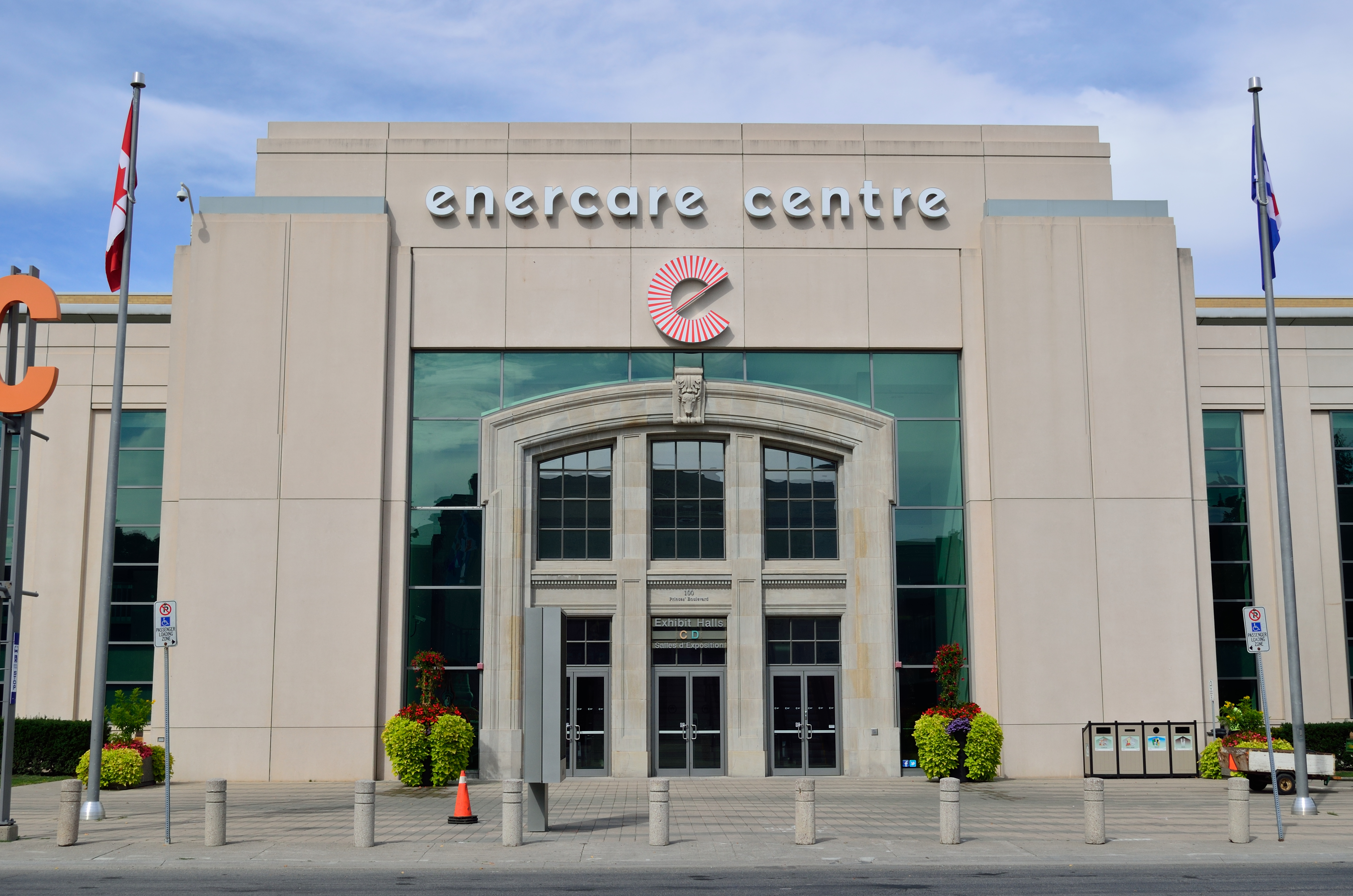
- Entrance on Princes' Boulevard

- Location within Toronto
- Former names: Direct Energy Centre (2006–2015); National Trade Centre (1997–2006)

General information
- Type: Exhibition complex
- Location: 100 Princes' Boulevard; Toronto, Ontario
- Coordinates: 43.635112°N 79.411197°W
- Completed: 1997
- Opened: April 3, 1997
- Owner: City of Toronto

Technical details
- Floor area: one million square feet (93,000 m^{2})

Website
- enercarecentre.com

Enercare Centre, formerly known as the Direct Energy Centre and originally the National Trade Centre, is an exhibition complex located at Exhibition Place in Toronto, Ontario, Canada. It is used by the Canadian National Exhibition and the Royal Agricultural Winter Fair, as well as by various trade shows. In 2015, it hosted several sport competitions and the broadcasting centre for the 2015 Pan American Games.

The naming rights for the complex are currently owned by energy services company Enercare Inc., a subsidiary of Brookfield Infrastructure Partners.

== History ==
Located just to the west of the Princes' Gates at the eastern end of Exhibition Place, it was previously the site of a streetcar loop and open space. The new building took over the frontage along Prince's Boulevard and connected to the existing Coliseum and Industry Buildings (also known as the Agricultural Annex), creating a large inter-connected exhibition complex. The existing southern entrance of the Coliseum was demolished and integrated into the new complex. The streetcar loop was moved to the north of the complex. The open space was previously the site of the Engineering and Electrical Building, opened in 1928 and torn down in 1972.

In 2005, the CNE Board of Directors entered into a ten-year agreement with Direct Energy Inc. to sponsor the centre's name, effective in March 2006. Fees go to a reserve fund which is used to keep the centre in a state of good repair. In 2014, part of Direct Energy was sold to Enercare Inc., including the name-in-title of the centre. The agreement was extended in 2016 for another ten years to end in 2026, at a value of CA$7.5 million.

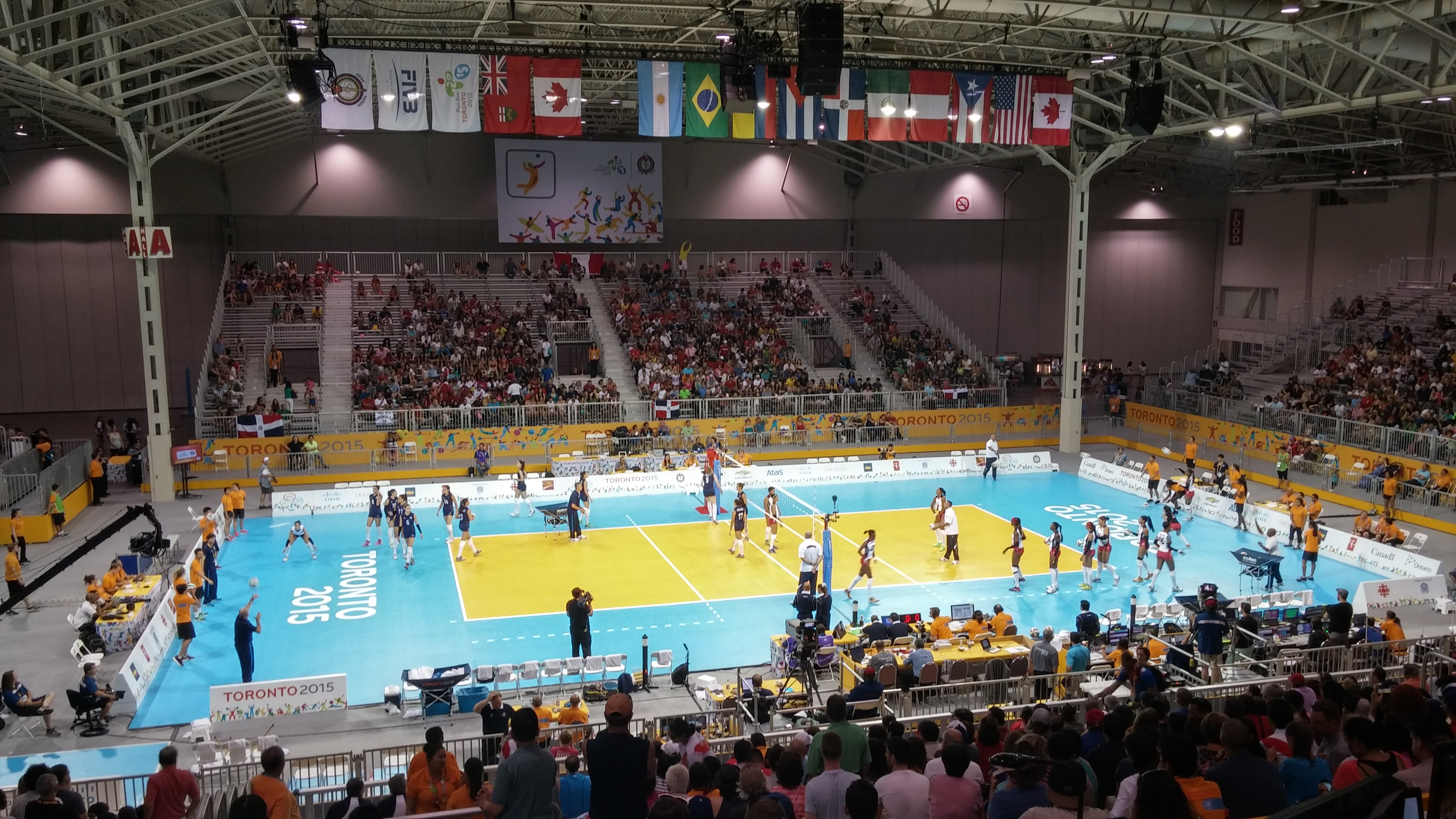
Volleyball at the exhibition centre during the 2015 Pan American Games.

At the 2015 Pan American Games, the venue hosted the sports of volleyball in Hall A, handball and roller sports figure skating in Hall B, racquetball and squash in Hall C and gymnastics in the adjoining Ricoh Coliseum. Pan American Games organizers referred to the centre as the "Exhibition Centre". The building was also the location of the Main Press and Broadcasting Centre for the Games (in Hall D).

In 2015, the Exhibition Place Board of Governors and the City of Toronto commissioned a study of a possible expansion of the facility. The proposed expansion would add an additional hall connected to the west end of the main building.

== Design ==
Designed by architectural teams Zeidler Partnership Architects and Dunlop-Farrow Architects, the building officially opened on April 3, 1997, with its first show being the National Home Show. It has seven exhibit halls with one million square feet (93,000 m^{2}) of exhibition space. Four of the halls are separated by removable walls to create configurable space. Additionally, the Coliseum and Horse Palace can be integrated into an exhibition. The project cost CA$180 million (CA$327 million in 2025 dollars). The cost was shared equally by the Toronto, Ontario and Canadian governments.

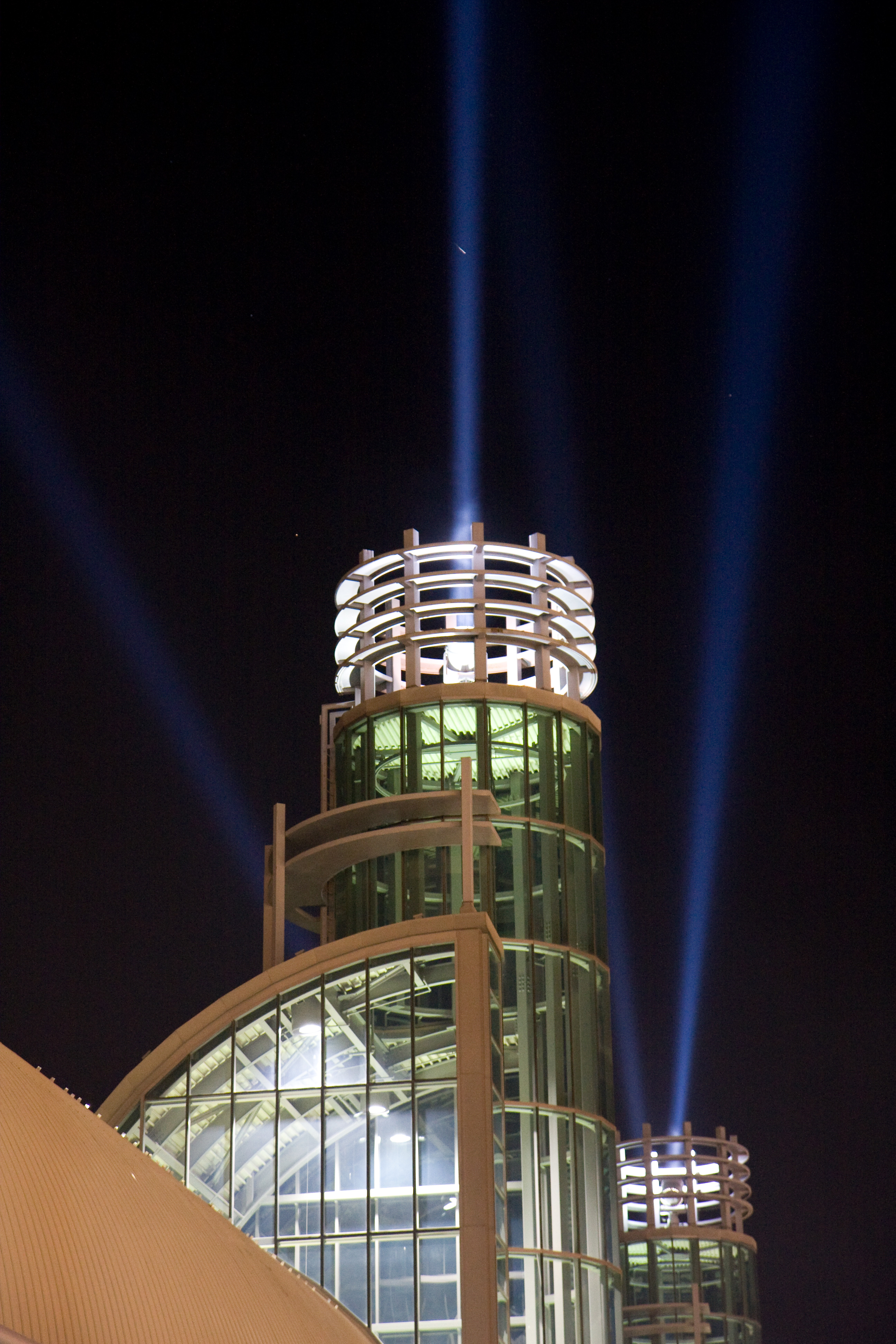
The towers of the exhibition centre features four rotating spotlights.

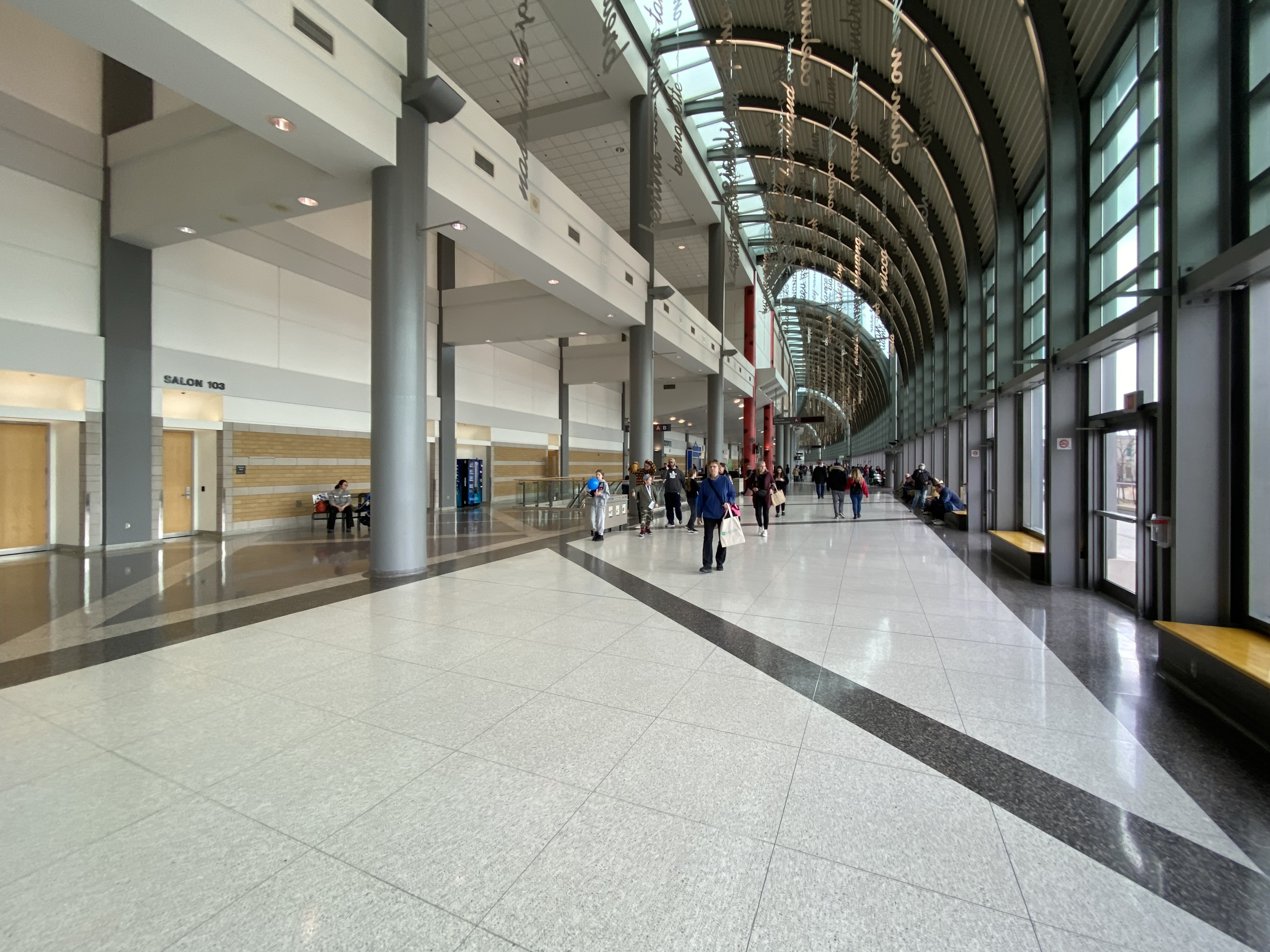
Lobby of the exhibition centre

The entire southern frontage is a long hall, linking the exhibit spaces with various offices. Most of the southern wall of the hall is glass, providing light to the entrances to the exhibit halls which have no windows. At the eastern end of the hall is a small open exhibition space, sometimes used as an art gallery, used by the CNE for cat and dog shows. At the eastern end of the hall is a "living wall." Under the main exhibit space is an underground parking garage, providing 1,300 spaces, which is connected to the Beanfield Centre in the Automotive Building to the south by a tunnel. Along the top of the hall at towers above entrances are four rotating spotlights which are illuminated when shows are being held at the centre. The external southern frontage differs along its length. The eastern section mimics the building style of the Automotive Building, using masonry and columns, while the western section is steel and glass, described as "flamboyant futurism".

To the north of the new addition is the "Heritage Court" hall, oriented west–east, which links the Coliseum, the Annex and the new addition. It is 50,000 square feet (4,600 m^{2}) in size. The western entrance to the complex is at the western end of the hall and serves as the main entrance to the Coliseum. The entrance is mostly glass and has a canopy extending to the west, where a canopy extends to the north, between the Horse Palace and the Coliseum, providing cover to those persons arriving from the TTC loop to the north. The original southern exteriors of the Coliseum and Industry Building, dating back to the 1920s, are preserved inside the hall. The Heritage Court is situated on the site of the TTC rail lines that separated the Coliseum and Industry buildings from the Engineering and Electrical Building. Four of the original "Statues of Industry" which adorned the facade of the Electrical and Engineering Building are mounted in the Heritage Court.

The Annex building is used to store cattle and small livestock during the Winter Fair and the CNE. Judging is done in small rings within the Annex, in the Coliseum and in a temporary judging area in the new addition. The area is also used by trade shows for demonstration space.

=== Usage ===
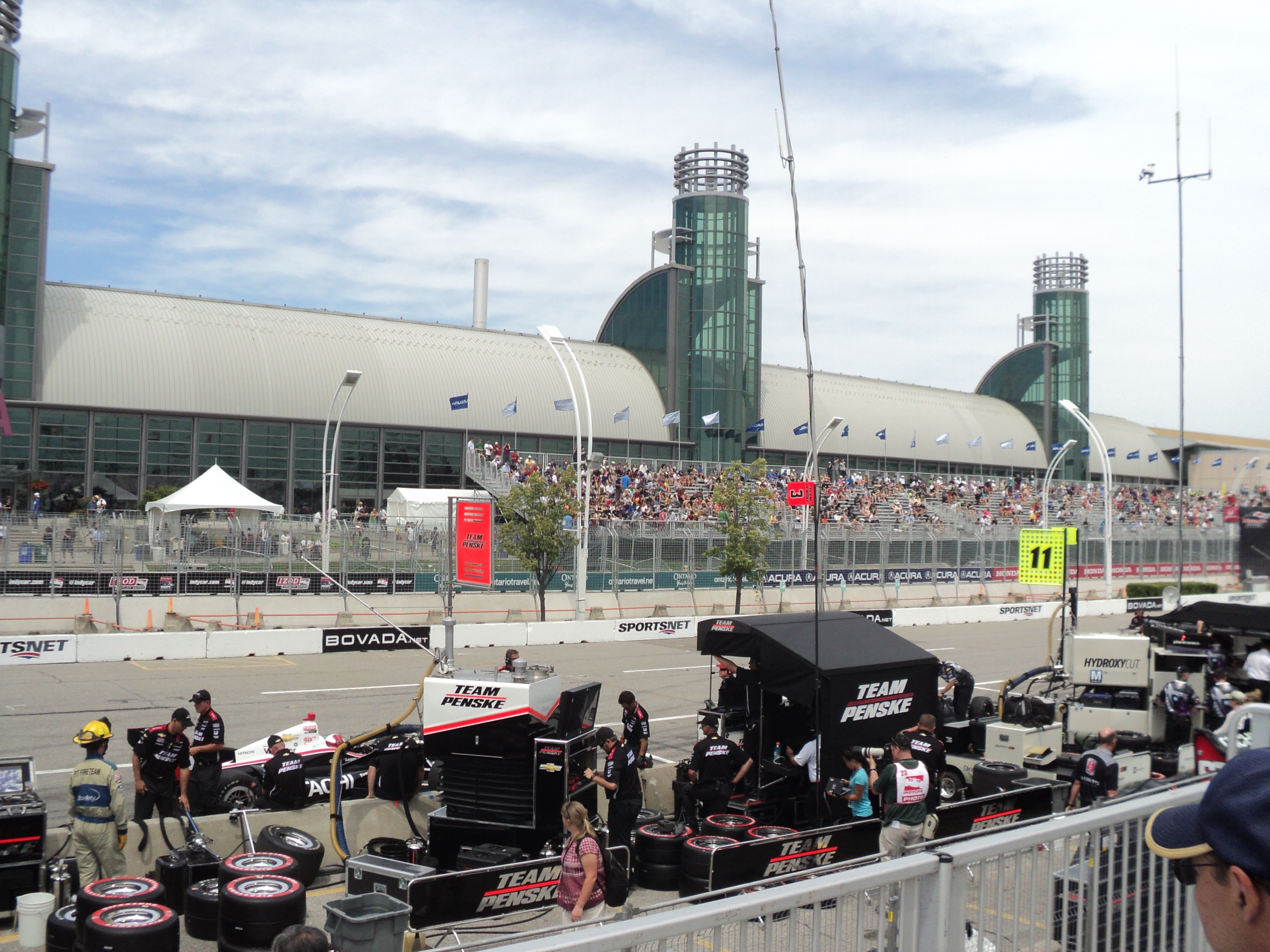
The 2013 Honda Indy Toronto race, with the Enercare Centre in the background. During the event, the centre typically hosts exhibits for the Indy.

As well as being used as part of the Canadian National Exhibition, it hosts the Royal Agricultural Winter Fair annually. Trade shows such as the Toronto International Boat Show, the National Home Show and the One of A Kind Show are held annually in the complex. The Grand Prix of Toronto IndyCar race also uses the hall for exhibit space. The City of Toronto uses various rooms for public meetings. It has also been a staple in hosting major volleyball events, such as 2019 Volleyball Canada Nationals and the 2023 Ontario Volleyball Championships.

The venue was used for Masters Toronto, the second international event of the 2025 Valorant Champions Tour season, from June 7 to 22.

=== Awards ===
- Architecture and Urban Design Awards 2000, Award: Large Place or Street

== See also ==
- International Centre
- Metro Toronto Convention Centre
- Toronto Congress Centre
- Venues of the 2015 Pan American and Parapan American Games
