= Hollie Naughton =

Canadian squash player (born 1994)

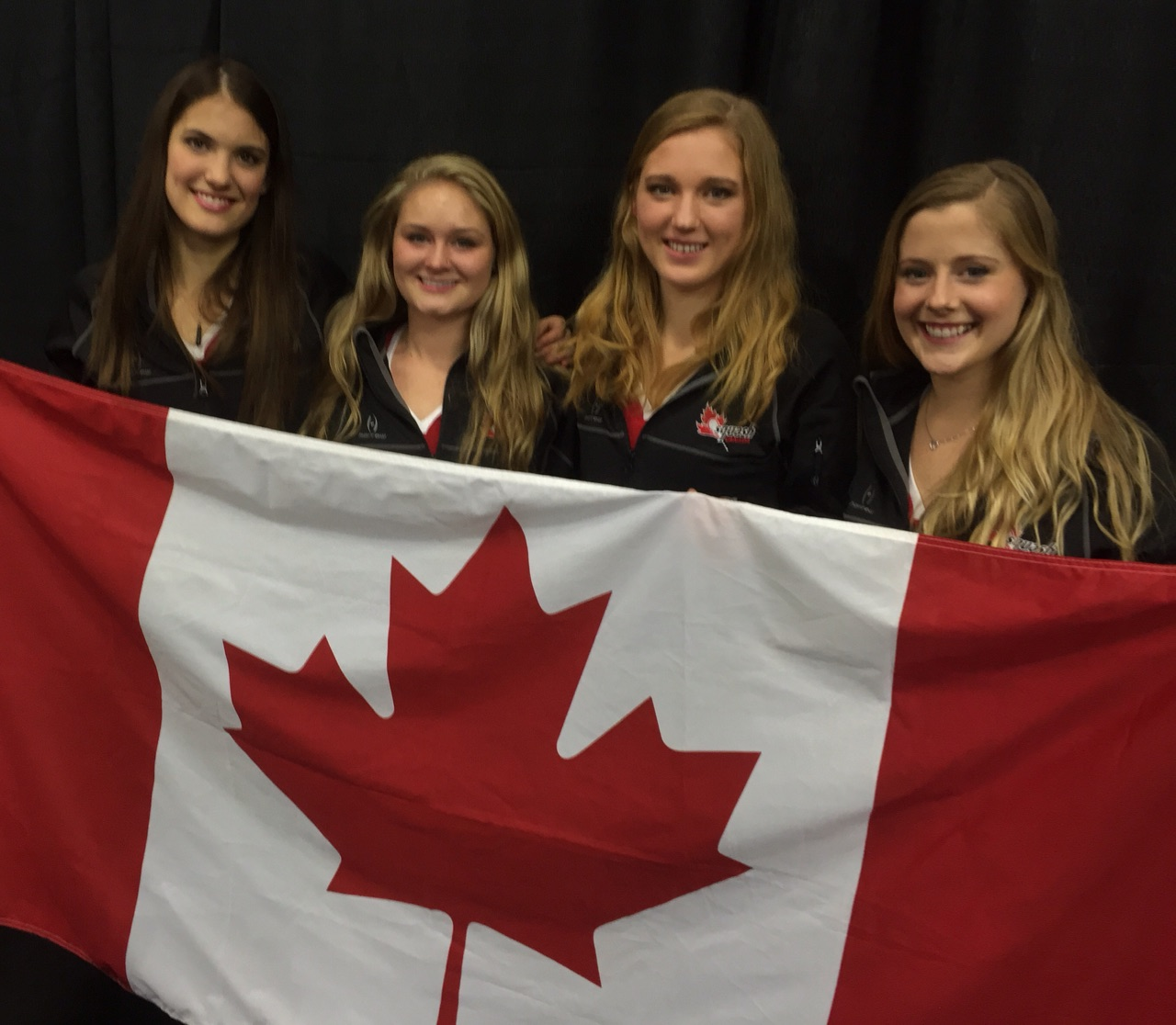

Personal information
- Born: October 21, 1994 (age 31) Barnsley, England

Sport
- Country: Canada
- Handedness: Left Handed
- Turned pro: 2012
- Coached by: David Palmer
- Retired: Active

Women's singles
- Highest ranking: No. 16 (January 2022)
- Current ranking: No. 31 (December 2024)
Medal record
Women's squash
Representing Canada
Pan American Games
Silver medal – second place	2015 Toronto	Team
Silver medal – second place	2019 Lima	Team
Silver medal – second place	2023 Santiago	Team
Bronze medal – third place	2019 Lima	Singles
Bronze medal – third place	2019 Lima	Mixed doubles
Bronze medal – third place	2023 Santiago	Singles
Commonwealth Games
Silver medal – second place	2022 Birmingham	Singles
- Updated on 4 August 2022

Hollie Naughton (born October 21, 1994) is a Canadian professional squash player. She reached a career-high world ranking of World No. 16 in January 2022. In 2016, she won her first Canadian Nationals title.

== Career ==
Naughton won a silver medal in the team event at the 2015 Pan American Games, and a bronze in the singles event at the 2019 Pan American Games.

On 3 August 2022, Naughton won silver in the women's singles at the 2022 Commonwealth Games in Birmingham, beaten 3-1 by England's Georgina Kennedy. In doing so, Naughton became the first Canadian women to win a medal in the sport of squash at the Commonwealth Games. Naughton also served as Canada's closing ceremony flagbearer.
