= Amanda Sobhy =

American squash player

Personal information
- Born: June 29, 1993 (age 33) Sea Cliff, New York, United States
- Height: 5 ft 8 in (173 cm)
- Weight: 150 lb (68 kg)
- Website: www.amandasobhy.com

Sport
- Country: United States
- Handedness: Left handed
- Turned pro: 2015
- Coached by: Wael El Hindi
- Racquet used: Head

Women's singles
- Highest ranking: No. 3 (October 2021)
- Current ranking: No. 11 (February 2026)
- Title: 23
Medal record
Women's squash
Representing United States
World Championships
| Bronze medal – third place | 2020–21 Chicago | Singles |
| Bronze medal – third place | 2022 Cairo | Singles |
World Team Championships
| Silver medal – second place | 2022 Cairo | Team |
| Silver medal – second place | 2024 Hong Kong | Team |
Pan American Games
| Gold medal – first place | 2015 Toronto | Singles |
| Gold medal – first place | 2015 Toronto | Doubles |
| Gold medal – first place | 2015 Toronto | Team |
| Gold medal – first place | 2019 Lima | Singles |
| Gold medal – first place | 2019 Lima | Doubles |
| Gold medal – first place | 2019 Lima | Team |
| Gold medal – first place | 2023 Santiago | Team |
| Silver medal – second place | 2023 Santiago | Singles |
| Silver medal – second place | 2023 Santiago | Doubles |
World Junior Championships
| Gold medal – first place | 2010 Cologne | Singles |

Amanda Sobhy (born June 29, 1993) is an American squash player. A five-time national champion, she was the first U.S.-born player to reach the top five in the Professional Squash Association (PSA) world rankings. She reached a career-high world ranking of No. 3 in October 2021 after reaching the semi-finals of the 2021 British Open and the 2021 CIB Egyptian Open, and winning the 2021 Oracle Netsuite Open.

== Early life ==
Amanda Sobhy was born in Sea Cliff, New York, to an Egyptian father, Khaled Sobhy, and an American mother, Jodie Larson. Both of her parents played squash.

Sobhy is a graduate of North Shore High School where she played volleyball, softball and as left halfback of the school's varsity soccer team during her freshman year. In eighth grade she broke her right ankle and shattered her tibia while playing softball.

In May 2015 she graduated from Harvard University, having majored in Social Anthropology and minored in Global Health and Health Policy.

== Career ==
=== Pre-college career ===
During the 2009 world juniors in Chennai, India, Sobhy defeated the third seed Laura Gemmel and following it, lost to Kanzy El Defrawy. During the semifinals, which happened few days later, she participated in a team competition with which she defeated Nour El Sherbini of Egypt who was just crowned junior world champion.

On April 24, 2010, she won the Racquet Club International in St. Louis, Missouri, making her the only player in women's professional squash, at the time, to have won three tournaments before the age of 17.

On June 29, 2010, on her 17th birthday, Sobhy won the World Junior Squash Championships, thus becoming the first, and only, American winner of the prestigious event. In the final she defeated Egyptian Nour El Tayeb with a score of 3–11, 11–7, 11–6, 11–7 in 37 minutes.

=== College career ===
After serving a short suspension for issues related to accepting tournament prize money, Sobhy joined the Harvard team as a freshman in January 2012, and two months into the team won her first national title. She won the individual championship, and her Harvard team won the team championship. In 2013, Sobhy finished the 2012–2013 college season undefeated, having lost her first game to Trinity's number 1, Kanzy Emad El Defrawy. The same year, Sobhy won the 2013 World Doubles Championship with Natalie Grainger. She won her second consecutive individual championship and her Harvard team won the team championship. In March 2014, Sobhy won the Granite Open and finished the 2013–2014 college season undefeated with a perfect 17–0 record. She won the individual championship for a third consecutive year. Sobhy finished the 2014–2015 college season with a perfect record and won her fourth individual intercollegiate title, defeating Kanzy El Defrawy 3–1. Sobhy finished her intercollegiate career undefeated in 62 matches, having dropped only two games in her four seasons of college competition.

=== Professional career ===
In December 2014, Sobhy led the US Women's Team to its best-ever finish in the World Team Championships, when she defeated world no. 6 Camille Serme in the deciding match to clinch fifth place over France.

In February 2015, Sobhy was honored with Harvard University's Richey Award, granted to the women's college squash player who best represents the ideals of the game.

In March 2015, Sobhy won her second US National Title, defeating Olivia Blatchford 11–7, 11–2, 11–9 in the final. In April, Sobhy won her first paycheck on the PSA tour at the Texas Open.

In July 2015 in Toronto, Sobhy became the first squash athlete to win three gold medals in a single Pan American Games, winning Women's Singles, Women's Doubles with partner Natalie Grainger, and the Women's Team event with Grainger and Olivia Blatchford. In the final of the Singles event, she beat American, Olivia Blatchford with a score of 11–8, 11–3, 11–3.

She claimed her 14th tour title when she won the NetSuite Open in San Francisco in September 2015, sharing her reward with Ramy Ashour.

In January 2016, Sobhy became the first American to ever reach the finals of the J.P. Morgan Tournament of Champions, which she lost facing Egypt's Nour El Sherbini.

In August 2016, Sobhy reached the finals of the Hong Kong Open, finishing runner-up to Nouran Gohar.

Sobhy tore her Achilles tendon on her left leg in March 2017 during the semifinals of a tournament in Colombia. She returned to play after 10 months at the J.P. Morgan Tournament of Champions in January 2018.

In 2018, Sobhy won her fourth US National Title at the Philadelphia Cricket Club, defeating Reeham Sedky 11–6, 11–8, 11–4.

Sobhy won the J Warren Young Memorial Texas Open in 2019, beating England's Victoria Lust in the final. In September the same year, she reached the final of the Open de France - Nantes, but lost against Camille Serme of France.

In 2020, Sobhy won the Cincinnati Cup, beating England's Sarah-Jane Perry in the final.

In 2022, she was part of the United States team that reached the final of the 2022 Women's World Team Squash Championships. It was the first time that the United States had reached the final. In May 2023, she reached the quarter final of the 2023 PSA Women's World Squash Championship, before losing to number 3 seed Hania El Hammamy.

In December 2023, Sobhy ruptured her Achilles tendon on her right leg at the Hong Kong Open. She underwent surgery in New York.

In December 2024, Sobhy helped the United States win the silver medal at the 2024 Women's World Team Squash Championships.

In March 2025, Sobhy won her 21st PSA title after securing victory in the German Open during the 2024–25 PSA Squash Tour and then won her 22nd after winning the Squash On Fire Open. The following season during the 2025–26 PSA Squash Tour, Sobhy won the Cincinnati Cup.

== Personal life ==
Sobhy serves on the board of the Squash Education Alliance, and is heavily involved in various urban squash programs. On January 21, 2019, after many years playing for Harrow Sports, Sobhy signed a long-term contract with HEAD, the global sporting brand with a focus on delivering high-performance products across a variety of athletic disciplines. She lives in Philadelphia.

Sobhy's family, including her brother, Omar and sister Sabrina, are all squash players. Before picking up squash, Sobhy played tennis, admiring Venus and Serena Williams. She began playing squash at the age of eleven, winning the first tournament she ever entered.

Amanda and Sabrina have been referred to as "The Williams Sisters of Squash."

== Major World Series final appearances ==
=== Tournament of Champions: 2 finals (0 title, 2 runner-ups) ===
| Outcome | Year | Opponent in the final | Score in the final |
|---|---|---|---|
| Runner-up | 2016 | (Egypt) Nour El Sherbini | 11–4, 9–11, 12–10, 11–8 |
| Runner-up | 2022 | (Egypt) Nouran Gohar | 11–7, 11–7, 11–3 |

=== Hong Kong Open: 1 final (0 title, 1 runner-up) ===
| Outcome | Year | Opponent in the final | Score in the final |
|---|---|---|---|
| Runner-up | 2016 | (Egypt) Nouran Gohar | 6–11, 12–10, 11–7, 11–8 |

=== CIB Black Ball Open: 1 final (0 title, 1 runner-up) ===
| Outcome | Year | Opponent in the final | Score in the final |
|---|---|---|---|
| Runner-up | 2021 | (Egypt) Nour El Sherbini | 13–11, 11–5, 6–11, 11–7 |

== See also ==
Official Women's Squash World Ranking

Awards and achievements
| Preceded by Sarah-Jane Perry | PSA Women's Young Player of the Year; 2014 | Succeeded by Current holder |
