= Diana García (squash player) =

Mexican squash player (born 1992)

Personal information
- Born: December 21, 1992 (age 33) Mexico City, Mexico

Sport
- Country: Mexico
- Handedness: Right Handed
- Turned pro: 2011
- Coached by: Gerardo de Paul Garcia
- Retired: Active
- Racquet used: Black Knight

Women's singles
- Highest ranking: No. 70 (October 2019)
- Current ranking: No. 70 (October 2019)
Medal record
Women's squash
Representing Mexico
Pan American Games
Silver medal – second place	2019 Lima	Mixed doubles
Bronze medal – third place	2015 Toronto	Team
Bronze medal – third place	2019 Lima	Team
- Updated on October 2019

Diana García (born 21 December 1992 in Mexico City) is a Mexican professional squash player. As of October 2019, she was ranked number 70 in the world.
