= Thaisa Serafini =

Brazilian squash player (born 1985)

Personal information
- Born: February 14, 1985 (age 41) Caxias do Sul, Brazil

Sport
- Country: Brazil
- Handedness: Right Handed
- Turned pro: 2007
- Coached by: Fernando Cechin
- Retired: Active
- Racquet used: Technifibre

Women's singles
- Highest ranking: No. 56 (December, 2012)
- Current ranking: No. 76 (January, 2016)
- Title: 2
- Tour final: 2
Medal record
Women's squash
Representing Brazil
South American Games
Silver medal – second place	2010 Medellín	Team
Bronze medal – third place	2010 Medellín	Doubles
- Updated on January, 2016

Thaisa Serafini (born February 14, 1985, in Caxias do Sul) is a professional squash player who represents Brazil. She reached a career-high world ranking of World No. 56 in December 2012.
