= Antonella Falcione =

Argentine squash player (born 1991)

Personal information
- Born: January 28, 1991 (age 35) Carlos Paz, Argentina

Sport
- Country: Argentina
- Handedness: Right Handed
- Turned pro: 2007
- Coached by: Diego De Bella
- Retired: Active
- Racquet used: Harrow

Women's singles
- Highest ranking: No. 65 (July, 2014)
- Current ranking: No. 66 (November, 2014)
- Title: 1
- Tour final: 3
Medal record
Women's squash
Representing Argentina
South American Games
| Silver medal – second place | 2010 Medellín | Doubles |
| Silver medal – second place | 2010 Medellín | Mixed doubles |
| Silver medal – second place | 2018 Cochabamba | Team |
| Silver medal – second place | 2018 Cochabamba | Mixed doubles |
| Bronze medal – third place | 2010 Medellín | Singles |
| Bronze medal – third place | 2010 Medellín | Team |
- Updated on November, 2014

Antonella Falcione (born 28 January 1991 in Carlos Paz) is a professional squash player who represents Argentina. She reached a career-high world ranking of World No. 65 in July 2014.
