= Samantha Terán =

Mexican squash player (born 1981)

Samantha Teran
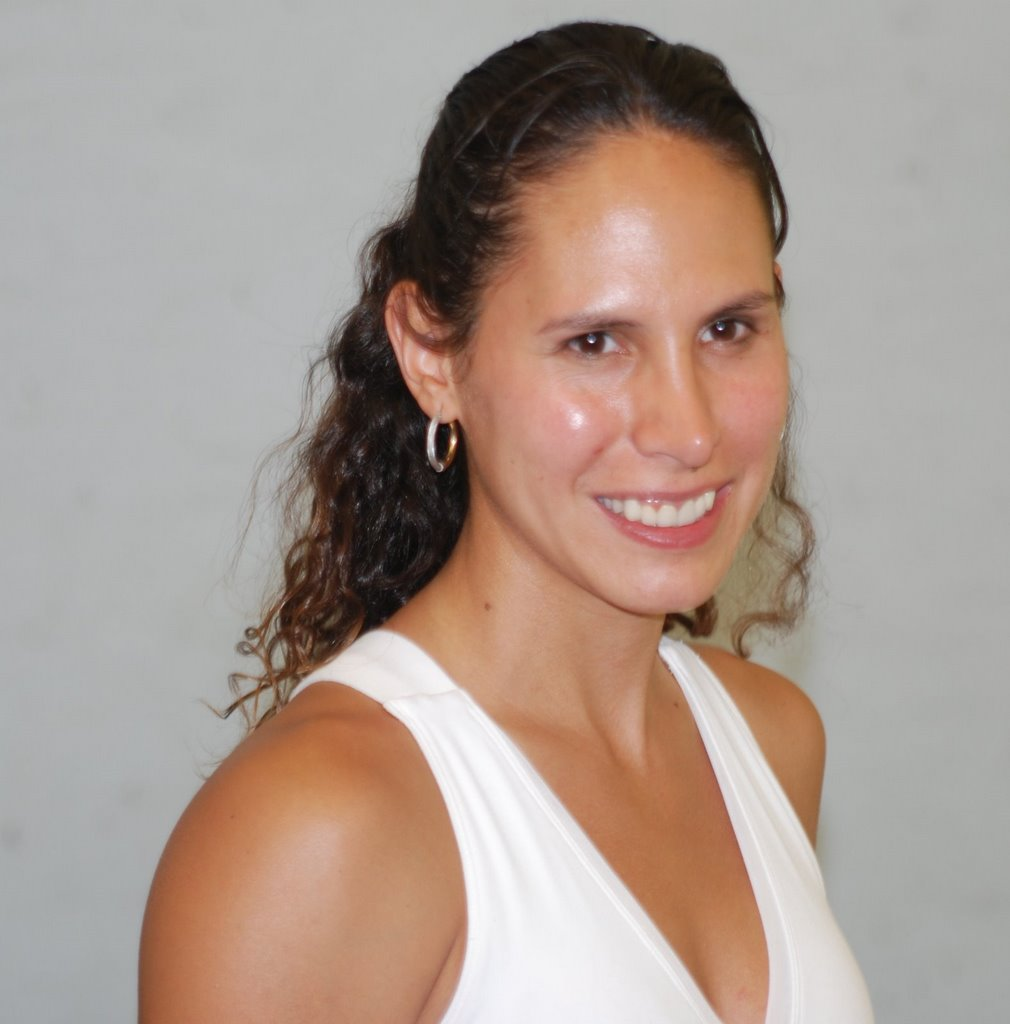

Personal information
- Full name: Samantha Quintanilla Teran
- Born: May 6, 1982 (age 44) Mexico City, Mexico

Sport
- Country: Mexico
- Handedness: Right Handed
- Turned pro: 2000
- Coached by: Javier Teran
- Retired: 2019
- Racquet used: Harrow

Women's singles
- Highest ranking: No. 11 (May 2010)
- Current ranking: No. 34 (January 2016)
- Title: 15
- Tour final: 19
Medal record
Women's squash
Representing Mexico
World Championships
Bronze medal – third place	2011 Rotterdam	Singles
Pan American Games
Gold medal – first place	2011 Guadalajara	Singles
Gold medal – first place	2011 Guadalajara	Doubles
Bronze medal – third place	2003 Santo Domingo	Singles
Bronze medal – third place	2003 Santo Domingo	Team
Bronze medal – third place	2007 Rio de Janeiro	Singles
Bronze medal – third place	2007 Rio de Janeiro	Team
Bronze medal – third place	2019 Lima	Team
- Updated on January 2016

Samantha Terán Quintanilla (born May 6, 1981, in Mexico City) is a professional female squash player who represents Mexico. Terán first joined the WISPA Tour in 2000, and she entered the world top twenty for the first time in 2008 as she won the eighth and ninth Tour titles of her career. These followed two in 2007, the Gannon Open and Toronto Open, in both events beating American Latasha Khan in the final.

In early 2008 it was Khan who was despatched in the finals of the Liberty Bell and Windy City Opens in the United States. The Mexican did it again in May to win the Subway Goshen Open, but this time Khan was beaten in the semis. Terán then captured another two titles at the end of June at Los Angeles Open, and at the Harrow Mexican Open, an event she had developed herself.

Added to her twelve Tour titles are a gold medal in the Pan American Games and four golds in the Central American and Caribbean Games. Terán reached a career-high world ranking of World No. 15 in February 2009.

In 2011 Terán reached the semi-finals of the 2011 World Open, becoming the first Mexican to do so.

== See also ==
- Official Women's Squash World Ranking
