= Olivia Clyne =

American squash player (born 1993)

Personal information
- Born: January 23, 1993 (age 33) New York, United States
- Height: 5 ft (152 cm)

Sport
- Country: United States
- Handedness: Right Handed
- Turned pro: 2006
- Retired: 2024
- Racquet used: Tecnifibre

Women's singles
- Highest ranking: No. 11 (October 2021)
Medal record
Women's squash
Representing United States
World Team Championships
Silver medal – second place	2022 Cairo	Team
Pan American Games
Gold medal – first place	2015 Toronto	Team
Gold medal – first place	2019 Lima	Team
Gold medal – first place	2023 Santiago	Team
Gold medal – first place	2023 Santiago	Mixed doubles
Silver medal – second place	2015 Toronto	Singles
Silver medal – second place	2019 Lima	Singles
Bronze medal – third place	2019 Lima	Mixed doubles
- Updated on September 2017

Olivia Clyne, (née Blatchford; born January 23, 1993) is a retired United States professional squash player.

== Career ==
Blatchford's junior accomplishments included winning the British Junior Open Girls under-15 event in 2007. She competed in the 2015 Pan American Games in Toronto, Canada, representing the United States. She won a silver medal in the individual event, and a gold medal in the teams event, with American compatriots Amanda Sobhy and Natalie Grainger.

She reached a career-high world ranking of World No. 11 in October 2021. She won the U.S. National Championship twice, in 2017 and 2019.

In 2022, she was part of the United States team that reached the final of the 2022 Women's World Team Squash Championships. It was the first time that the United States had reached the final, where the Egyptian team eventually retained the title.

She announced her retirement from the PSA tour for January 1, 2024.

== Personal life ==
In 2018, Blatchford married Alan Clyne, a fellow professional squash player.
