= Squash at the Pan American Games =

- No. of events: 7 (men: 3; women: 3; mixed: 1)

Squash has been a sport of the Pan American Games since the 1995 games.

== Medal table ==
As of the end of the 2023 Pan American Games.

Rank	Nation	Gold	Silver	Bronze	Total
1	United States	14	11	10	35
2	Canada	13	16	18	47
3	Colombia	8	5	10	23
4	Mexico	5	4	19	28
5	Peru	2	1	4	7
6	Argentina	0	3	6	9
7	Brazil	0	2	7	9
8	Barbados	0	0	2	2
8	Chile	0	0	2	2
8	Independent Athletes Team	0	0	2	2
11	Guyana	0	0	1	1
11	Paraguay	0	0	1	1
Totals (12 entries)		42	42	82	166

== Men ==
=== Singles ===
Games	Gold	Silver	Bronze
1995 Mar del Plata	Gary Waite; Canada	Jonathon Power; Canada	Sabir Butt; Canada
1995 Mar del Plata	Gary Waite; Canada	Jonathon Power; Canada	Jamie Crombie; Canada
1999 Winnipeg	Graham Ryding; Canada	Jorge Gutiérrez; Argentina	Ronivaldo Conceição; Brazil
1999 Winnipeg	Graham Ryding; Canada	Jorge Gutiérrez; Argentina	Federico Usandizaga; Argentina
2003 Santo Domingo	Shahier Razik; Canada	Graham Ryding; Canada	Ronivaldo Conceição; Brazil
2003 Santo Domingo	Shahier Razik; Canada	Graham Ryding; Canada	Preston Quick; United States
2007 Rio de Janeiro	Eric Gálvez; Mexico	Julian Illingworth; United States	Shawn Delierre; Canada
2007 Rio de Janeiro	Eric Gálvez; Mexico	Julian Illingworth; United States	Miguel Ángel Rodríguez; Colombia
2011 Guadalajara	Miguel Ángel Rodríguez; Colombia	César Salazar; Mexico	Shawn Delierre; Canada
2011 Guadalajara	Miguel Ángel Rodríguez; Colombia	César Salazar; Mexico	Arturo Salazar; Mexico
2015 Toronto	Miguel Ángel Rodríguez; Colombia	Diego Elías; Peru	Shawn Delierre; Canada
2015 Toronto	Miguel Ángel Rodríguez; Colombia	Diego Elías; Peru	César Salazar; Mexico
2019 Lima	Diego Elías; Peru	Miguel Ángel Rodríguez; Colombia	César Salazar; Mexico
2019 Lima	Diego Elías; Peru	Miguel Ángel Rodríguez; Colombia	Robertino Pezzota; Argentina
2023 Santiago	Diego Elías; Peru	Miguel Ángel Rodríguez; Colombia	Leonel Cárdenas; Mexico
2023 Santiago	Diego Elías; Peru	Miguel Ángel Rodríguez; Colombia	César Salazar; Mexico

=== Doubles ===
Games	Gold	Silver	Bronze
2011 Guadalajara	Arturo Salazar; Eric Gálvez; Mexico	Christopher Gordon; Julian Illingworth; United States	Hernán D'Arcangelo; Robertino Pezzota; Argentina
2011 Guadalajara	Arturo Salazar; Eric Gálvez; Mexico	Christopher Gordon; Julian Illingworth; United States	Esteban Casarino; Nicolas Caballero; Paraguay
2015 Toronto	Andrés Herrera; Juan Camilo Vargas; Colombia	Andrew Schnell; Graeme Schnell; Canada	Christopher Gordon; Chris Hanson; United States
2015 Toronto	Andrés Herrera; Juan Camilo Vargas; Colombia	Andrew Schnell; Graeme Schnell; Canada	Diego Elías; Andrés Duany; Peru
2019 Lima	United States; Todd Harrity; Chris Hanson	Canada; Shawn Delierre; Nick Sachvie	Mexico; Arturo Salazar; César Salazar
2019 Lima	United States; Todd Harrity; Chris Hanson	Canada; Shawn Delierre; Nick Sachvie	Peru; Diego Elías; Alonso Escudero
2023 Santiago	Colombia; Juan Camilo Vargas; Ronald Palomino	Mexico; Leonel Cárdenas; César Salazar	Peru; Diego Elías; Alonso Escudero
2023 Santiago	Colombia; Juan Camilo Vargas; Ronald Palomino	Mexico; Leonel Cárdenas; César Salazar	Independent Athletes Team; Josué Enríquez; Alejandro Enríquez

=== Team ===
Games	Gold	Silver	Bronze
1995 Mar del Plata	Canada; Gary Waite; Jonathon Power; Sabir Butt; Jamie Crombie	Argentina	Brazil
1999 Winnipeg	Canada; Graham Ryding; Viktor Berg; Shahier Razik; Jonathon Power	Brazil	Argentina
1999 Winnipeg	Canada; Graham Ryding; Viktor Berg; Shahier Razik; Jonathon Power	Brazil	Colombia
2003 Santo Domingo	Canada; Graham Ryding; Viktor Berg; Shahier Razik	Brazil; Rafael Alarçón; Ronivaldo Conceição; Luciano Barbosa	Argentina; Jorge Gutiérrez; Robertino Pezzota; Rodrigo Pezzota
2003 Santo Domingo	Canada; Graham Ryding; Viktor Berg; Shahier Razik	Brazil; Rafael Alarçón; Ronivaldo Conceição; Luciano Barbosa	Mexico; Jorge Baltazar; Armando Zarazua; Marcos Mendez
2007 Rio de Janeiro	Colombia; Javier Castilla; Miguel Ángel Rodríguez; Bernardo Samper	Canada; Robin Clarke; Shahier Razik; Shawn Delierre	Mexico; Marcos Mendez; Eric Gálvez; Jorge Baltazar
2007 Rio de Janeiro	Colombia; Javier Castilla; Miguel Ángel Rodríguez; Bernardo Samper	Canada; Robin Clarke; Shahier Razik; Shawn Delierre	Brazil; Luciano Barbosa; Ronivaldo Conceição; Rafael Alarçón
2011 Guadalajara	Mexico; Eric Gálvez; Arturo Salazar; César Salazar	Canada; Shawn Delierre; Shahier Razik; Andrew Schnell	Brazil; Vinicius De Lima; Rafael Alarçón; Vinicius Rodrigues
2011 Guadalajara	Mexico; Eric Gálvez; Arturo Salazar; César Salazar	Canada; Shawn Delierre; Shahier Razik; Andrew Schnell	United States; Graham Bassett; Christopher Gordon; Julian Illingworth
2015 Toronto	Canada; Shawn Delierre; Andrew Schnell; Graeme Schnell	Mexico; Eric Gálvez; César Salazar; Arturo Salazar	Argentina; Rodrigo Pezzota; Robertino Pezzota; Leandro Romiglio
2015 Toronto	Canada; Shawn Delierre; Andrew Schnell; Graeme Schnell	Mexico; Eric Gálvez; César Salazar; Arturo Salazar	United States; Christopher Gordon; Chris Hanson; Todd Harrity
2019 Lima	United States; Andrew Douglas; Chris Hanson; Todd Harrity	Colombia; Miguel Ángel Rodríguez; Andrés Herrera; Juan Camilo Vargas	Canada; Shawn Delierre; Nick Sachvie; Andrew Schnell
2019 Lima	United States; Andrew Douglas; Chris Hanson; Todd Harrity	Colombia; Miguel Ángel Rodríguez; Andrés Herrera; Juan Camilo Vargas	Mexico; Alfredo Ávila; César Salazar; Arturo Salazar
2023 Santiago	Colombia; Juan Camilo Vargas; Ronald Palomino; Miguel Ángel Rodríguez	Argentina; Robertino Pezzota; Leandro Romiglio; Jeremías Azaña	Canada; David Baillargeon; Graeme Schnell; George Crowne
2023 Santiago	Colombia; Juan Camilo Vargas; Ronald Palomino; Miguel Ángel Rodríguez	Argentina; Robertino Pezzota; Leandro Romiglio; Jeremías Azaña	Peru; Diego Elías; Alonso Escudero; Rafael Gálvez

== Women ==
=== Singles ===
Games	Gold	Silver	Bronze
1995 Mar del Plata	Heather Wallace; Canada	Demer Holleran; United States	Ellie Pierce; United States
1995 Mar del Plata	Heather Wallace; Canada	Demer Holleran; United States	Alicia McConnell; Canada
1999 Winnipeg	Melanie Jans; Canada	Demer Holleran; United States	Marnie Baizley; Canada
1999 Winnipeg	Melanie Jans; Canada	Demer Holleran; United States	Latasha Khan; United States
2003 Santo Domingo	Latasha Khan; United States	Melanie Jans; Canada	Marnie Baizley; Canada
2003 Santo Domingo	Latasha Khan; United States	Melanie Jans; Canada	Samantha Terán; Mexico
2007 Rio de Janeiro	Natalie Grainger; United States	Alana Miller; Canada	Runa Reta; Canada
2007 Rio de Janeiro	Natalie Grainger; United States	Alana Miller; Canada	Samantha Terán; Mexico
2011 Guadalajara	Samantha Terán; Mexico	Samantha Cornett; Canada	Miranda Ranieri; Canada
2011 Guadalajara	Samantha Terán; Mexico	Samantha Cornett; Canada	Nicolette Fernandes; Guyana
2015 Toronto	Amanda Sobhy; United States	Olivia Clyne; United States	Samantha Cornett; Canada
2015 Toronto	Amanda Sobhy; United States	Olivia Clyne; United States	Samantha Terán; Mexico
2019 Lima	Amanda Sobhy; United States	Olivia Clyne; United States	Samantha Cornett; Canada
2019 Lima	Amanda Sobhy; United States	Olivia Clyne; United States	Hollie Naughton; Canada
2023 Santiago	Olivia Weaver; United States	Amanda Sobhy; United States	Marina Stefanoni; United States
2023 Santiago	Olivia Weaver; United States	Amanda Sobhy; United States	Hollie Naughton; Canada

=== Doubles ===
Games	Gold	Silver	Bronze
2011 Guadalajara	Nayelly Hernández; Samantha Terán; Mexico	Catalina Peláez; Silvia Angulo; Colombia	Miranda Ranieri; Stephanie Edmison; Canada
2011 Guadalajara	Nayelly Hernández; Samantha Terán; Mexico	Catalina Peláez; Silvia Angulo; Colombia	Maria Ubina; Olivia Clyne; United States
2015 Toronto	Amanda Sobhy; Natalie Grainger; United States	Samantha Cornett; Nikki Todd; Canada	Catalina Peláez; Laura Tovar; Colombia
2015 Toronto	Amanda Sobhy; Natalie Grainger; United States	Samantha Cornett; Nikki Todd; Canada	Samantha Terán; Karla Urrutia; Mexico
2019 Lima	United States; Amanda Sobhy; Sabrina Sobhy	Canada; Samantha Cornett; Danielle Letourneau	Chile; Giselle Delgado; Ana María Pinto
2019 Lima	United States; Amanda Sobhy; Sabrina Sobhy	Canada; Samantha Cornett; Danielle Letourneau	Colombia; Laura Tovar; María Tovar
2023 Santiago	Colombia; Laura Tovar; Lucía Bautista	United States; Amanda Sobhy; Olivia Weaver	Chile; Ana María Pinto; Giselle Delgado
2023 Santiago	Colombia; Laura Tovar; Lucía Bautista	United States; Amanda Sobhy; Olivia Weaver	Barbados; Meagan Best; Margot Prow

=== Team ===
Games	Gold	Silver	Bronze
1995 Mar del Plata	Canada; Heather Wallace; Melanie Jans; Kelsey Souchereau; Anita Soni	United States	Colombia
1999 Winnipeg	Canada; Carolyn Russell; Marnie Baizley; Melanie Jans; Kelsey Souchereau	United States	Brazil
1999 Winnipeg	Canada; Carolyn Russell; Marnie Baizley; Melanie Jans; Kelsey Souchereau	United States	Mexico
2003 Santo Domingo	United States; Latasha Khan; Louisa Hall; Meredeth Quick	Canada; Carolyn Russell; Marnie Baizley; Melanie Jans	Mexico; Samantha Terán; Teresa Osorio; Diana Huerta
2003 Santo Domingo	United States; Latasha Khan; Louisa Hall; Meredeth Quick	Canada; Carolyn Russell; Marnie Baizley; Melanie Jans	Brazil; Karen Redfern; Patricia Pamplona; Flávia Roberts
2007 Rio de Janeiro	Canada; Carolyn Russell; Runa Reta; Alana Miller	United States; Michelle Quibell; Natalie Grainger; Latasha Khan	Colombia; Catalina Peláez; Silvia Angulo; Isabel Restrepo
2007 Rio de Janeiro	Canada; Carolyn Russell; Runa Reta; Alana Miller	United States; Michelle Quibell; Natalie Grainger; Latasha Khan	Mexico; Nayelly Hernández; Samantha Terán; Karina Herrera
2011 Guadalajara	Canada; Samantha Cornett; Stephanie Edmison; Miranda Ranieri	Colombia; Silvia Angulo; Catalina Peláez; Anna Porras	Mexico; Nayelly Hernández; Imelda Salazar; Samantha Terán
2011 Guadalajara	Canada; Samantha Cornett; Stephanie Edmison; Miranda Ranieri	Colombia; Silvia Angulo; Catalina Peláez; Anna Porras	United States; Olivia Clyne; Lily Lorentzen; Maria Ubina
2015 Toronto	United States; Amanda Sobhy; Olivia Clyne; Natalie Grainger	Canada; Samantha Cornett; Nikki Todd; Hollie Naughton	Mexico; Samantha Terán; Karla Urrutia; Diana García
2015 Toronto	United States; Amanda Sobhy; Olivia Clyne; Natalie Grainger	Canada; Samantha Cornett; Nikki Todd; Hollie Naughton	Colombia; Catalina Peláez; Laura Tovar; Karol González
2019 Lima	United States; Olivia Clyne; Amanda Sobhy; Sabrina Sobhy	Canada; Samantha Cornett; Danielle Letourneau; Hollie Naughton	Mexico; Dina Anguiano; Samantha Terán; Diana García
2019 Lima	United States; Olivia Clyne; Amanda Sobhy; Sabrina Sobhy	Canada; Samantha Cornett; Danielle Letourneau; Hollie Naughton	Colombia; Catalina Peláez; Laura Tovar; María Tovar
2023 Santiago	United States; Amanda Sobhy; Olivia Clyne; Olivia Weaver	Canada; Nikki Todd; Hollie Naughton; Nicole Bunyan	Barbados; Meagan Best; Amanda Haywood; Margot Prow
2023 Santiago	United States; Amanda Sobhy; Olivia Clyne; Olivia Weaver	Canada; Nikki Todd; Hollie Naughton; Nicole Bunyan	Colombia; Catalina Peláez; Laura Tovar; Lucía Bautista

== Mixed doubles ==
Games	Gold	Silver	Bronze
2019 Lima	Colombia; Miguel Ángel Rodríguez; Catalina Peláez	Mexico; Alfredo Ávila; Diana García	Canada; Andrew Schnell; Hollie Naughton
2019 Lima	Colombia; Miguel Ángel Rodríguez; Catalina Peláez	Mexico; Alfredo Ávila; Diana García	United States; Andrew Douglas; Olivia Clyne
2023 Santiago	United States; Olivia Clyne; Timothy Brownell	Canada; Nicole Bunyan; George Crowne	Independent Athletes Team; Tabita Gaitán; Luis Quinquinay
2023 Santiago	United States; Olivia Clyne; Timothy Brownell	Canada; Nicole Bunyan; George Crowne	Colombia; Catalina Peláez; Miguel Ángel Rodríguez

== Events ==
Event	1995	1999	2003	2007	2011	2015	2019	2023
Men's singles	•	•	•	•	•	•	•	•
Men's doubles					•	•	•	•
Men's team	•	•	•	•	•	•	•	•
Women's singles	•	•	•	•	•	•	•	•
Women's doubles					•	•	•	•
Women's team	•	•	•	•	•	•	•	•
Mixed doubles							•	•
Events	4	4	4	4	6	6	7	7

== See also ==
- Federation of Panamerica
- Pan American Squash Championships
