= Professional Squash Doubles =

Professional Squash Doubles is the organized, professional competition of squash doubles, a variant of squash which features teams of two people. It is governed by the Squash Doubles Association (SDA) Pro Tour. Professional doubles began for men in 1938, while the women's professional doubles association formed in 2007.

== Men's Professional Doubles ==
Professional doubles started in 1938 at The Heights Casino in Brooklyn, NY. It had a viable tour starting in the late 1970s with events located in both the United States and Canada. In 2000, the doubles pro tour rebranded itself with the new name, International Squash Doubles Association (ISDA), and again in 2012 as The Squash Doubles Association Pro Tour (SDA Pro Tour). It is the governing body responsible for the men's world professional squash doubles tour and celebrated its 75th anniversary of professional doubles in 2013.

== Women's Professional Doubles ==
Since the Women's Doubles Squash Association (WDSA) formed in 2007, it has reached several of its goals. It has increased the number of women playing professional and amateur doubles and encouraged former college players, current teaching professionals and WISPA touring professionals to play.

In addition to the tour growth, with stops throughout the United States and Canada, the WDSA has helped foster and build women's doubles on the amateur level which has been achieved through pro-am tournaments and Under 30 events at local clubs.

The WDSA, corporate partners, patrons and membership have established relationships with local charities throughout the United States – City Squash, METRO squash, Mile High Squash and Squash Haven – all urban squash programs.

Top international female singles players who have made the successful transition to doubles and their highest WISPA ranking:

Natalie Grainger USA #1 Narelle Krizek AUSTRALIA #23 Suzie Pierrepont ENGLAND #23 Amanda Sobhy USA #17 (World Junior Champion)

== Major Professional Results ==
=== North American Open ===
Year	Winner
1931	Roy R. Coffin & Neil J. Sullivan, II
1932	Roy R. Coffin & Neil J. Sullivan, II
1935	Donald Strachan & Brendon Walsh
1936	Donald Strachan & Brendon Walsh
1937	David McMullin & W. Mifflin Large
1938	William E. Slack & H. Hunter Lott, Jr.
1939	Roy R. Coffin & Neil J. Sullivan, Jr.
1940	David McMullin & W. Mifflin Large
1941	William E. Slack & H. Hunter Lott, Jr.
1942	Charles M. P. Brinton & Donald Strachan
1947	M. S. Teeny & Clifford Sutter
1948	Charles M. P. Brinton & Stanley W. Pearson, Jr.
1949	Charles M. P. Brinton & Stanely W. Pearson, Jr.
1950	G. Diehl Mateer, Jr. & H. Hunter Lott, Jr.
1951	Germain G. Glidden & Clifford Sutter
1952	Germain G. Glidden & Clifford Sutter
1953	Carlton M. Badger & James M. Ethridge, III
1954	Carlton M. Badger & James M. Ethridge, III
1955	Carlton M. Badger & James M. Ethridge, III
1956	James H. Whitmoyer & Howard A. Davis
1958	Charles M. P. Brinton & Edward W. Madeira, Jr.
1959	Carlton M. Badger & James M. Ethridge, III
1960	Carlton M. Badger & James M. Ethridge, III
1961	Carlton M. Badger & James M. Ethridge, III
1962	Samuel P. Howe, III & James M. Ethridge, III
1963	Christian C. F. Spahr, Jr. & Claude Beer
1964	Samuel P. Howe, III & R. William Danforth
1965	Samuel P. Howe, III & R. William Danforth
1966	Stephen T. Vehslage & Ramsey W Vehslage
1967	Stephen T. Vehslage & Ramsey W. Vehslage
1968	Samuel P. Howe, III & Claude Beer
1969	Victor Elmaleh & Ralph E. Howe
1970	Christian C. F. Spahr, Jr. & Maurice Heckscher
1971	Roger E. Alcaly & Mel K. Sokolow
1972	Anil Nayar & Thomas M. Poor
1973	Michael J. Pierce & J. Peter Pierce
1974	W. Roland Oddy & Pedro A. Bacallao
1975	Michael J. Pierce & Thomas M. Poor
1976	Peter S. Briggs & Ralph E. Howe
1977	Richard Roe & Thomas M. Poor
1978	Richard Roe & Thomas M. Poor
1979	Lawrence S. Heath, III & John R. Reese
1980	Michael J. Pierce & David C. Johnson, III
1981	Lawrence S. Heath, III & John R. Reese
1982	Peter Chester & Palmer Page
1984	Peter Briggs & Mark Talbott
1985	Mike Desaulniers & Brad Desaulniers
1986	Mike Desaulniers & Brad Desaulniers
1986	Todd Binns & Todd Page
1987	Todd Binns & Todd Page
1988	Todd Binns & Todd Page
1989	Alan Grant & Ned Edwards
1990	Alan Grant & Ned Edwards
1991	Alan Grant & Ned Edwards
1992	not played
1993	Kenton Jernigan & Jamie Bentley
1994	Scott Dulmage & Gary Waite
1995	Peter Briggs & Jeff Stanley
1996	Scott Stoneburgh & Anders Wahlstedt
1997	Gary Waite & Mark Talbott
1998	Gary Waite & Mark Talbott
1999	Gary Waite & Mark Talbott
2000	Gary Waite & Damien Mudge
2001	Gary Waite & Damien Mudge
2003	Gary Waite & Damien Mudge
2004	Gary Waite & Damien Mudge
2005	Gary Waite & Damien Mudge
2006	Gary Waite & Damien Mudge
2007	Paul Price & Ben Gould
2008	Damien Mudge & Viktor Berg
2009	Ben Gould & Paul Price
2010	Damien Mudge & Viktor Berg
2011	Ben Gould & Damien Mudge

=== U.S. Pro ===
Year	Winner
1995	Jamie Bentley & Kenton Jernigan
1996	Jamie Bentley & Gary Waite
1997	Mark Talbott & Gary Waite
1998	Jamie Bentley & Scott Stoneburgh
1999	Mark Talbott & Gary Waite
2000	Anders Wahlstedt & Scott Stoneburgh
2001	Damien Mudge & Gary Waite
2003	Damien Mudge & Gary Waite
2004	Damien Mudge & Gary Waite
2005	Damien Mudge & Gary Waite
2006	Ben Gould & Preston Quick
2007	Damien Mudge & Gary Waite
2008	Damien Mudge & Viktor Berg
2009	Damien Mudge & Viktor Berg
2010	Chris Walker & Mark Chaloner
2011	Ben Gould & Damien Mudge

=== Johnson ===
Year	Winner
1938	George Cummings & Frank Ward
1939	Stanley Galowin & Joseph Wiener
1940	George Cummings & Thomas Iannicelli
1941	George Cummings & Thomas Iannicelli
1947	George Cummings & Thomas Ianrucelli
1948	George Cummings & Thomas lannicelli
1954	John B. Russell, III & Richard Remsen, Jr.
1955	Carlton M. Badger & James M. Ethridge, III
1956	Albert Chassard & Thomas Iannicelli
1957	Albert Chassard & Thomas Iannicelli
1958	John B. Russell, III & Richard Remsen, Jr.
1960	Albert Chassard & Frank Iannicelli
1961	Albert Chassard & Frank Iannicelli
1962	Albert Chassard & Frank Iannicelli
1963	Victor Elmaleh & David C. Johnson, Jr.
1964	Christian C. F. Spahr, Jr. & Claude Beer
1966	Stephen T. Vehslage & Ramsay W Vehslage
1967	Samuel P. Howe, III & R. William Danforth
1968	Ian M.T. McAvity & Kenneth K Binns
1969	Mohibullah Khan & Coln Adair
1970	Mohibullah Khan & Colin Adair
1971	Mohibullah Khan & Kenneth K. Binns
1972	Mohibullah Khan & Kenneth K. Binns
1973	Mohibullah Khan & Gul Khan
1974	Michael J. Pierce & Maurice Heckscher, II
1975	Roger Alcaly & Mel K. Sokolow
1976	Michael J. Pierce & Maurice Heckscher, II
1977	Michael J. Pierce & Maurice Heckscher, II
1978	Michael J. Pierce & Maurice Heckscher, II
1979	Lawrence S. Heath, III & John R. Reese
1980	C. Victor Harding & Gordon D. H. Anderson
1981	Michael Desaulniers & Maurice Heckscher, II
1982	Michael Desaulniers & Maurice Heckscher, II
1983	David C. Johnson, III & Edward C. P. Edwards
1984	Peter S. Briggs & Gul Khan
1985	David C. Johnson, III & Edward C. P. Edwards
1986	David C. Johnson, III & Edward C. P. Edwards
1987	John Nimick & Clive Caldwell
1988	Todd Binns & Thomas E. Page
1989	Todd Binns & Thomas E. Page
1990	Kenton Jernigan & Jamie Bentley
1991	Kenton Jernigan & Jamie Bentley
1992	Todd Binns & Jose Pepe Martinez
1993	Kenton Jernigan & Jamie Bentley
1994	Kenton Jernigan & Jamie Bentley
1995	Kenton Jernigan & Jamie Bentley
1996	Gary Waite & Jamie Bentley
1997	Gary Waite & Jamie Bentley
1998	Gary Waite & Mark Talbott
1999	Gary Waite & Mark Talbott
2000	Willie Hosey & Jamie Bentley
2001	Michael Pimak & Viktor Berg
2002	Gary Waite & Damien Mudge
2003	Gary Waite & Damien Mudge

=== The Elite ===
Year	Winner
1982	Michael J. Pierce & Thomas E. Page
1983	David C. Johnson, III & Edward C. P. Edwards
1984	Peter Briggs & David C. Johnson, III
1985	Michael J. Pierce & Thomas E. Page
1986	Michael J. Pierce & Jamie Bentley
1987	Todd Binns & Thomas E. Page
1988	Alan Grant & Jamie Bentley
1989	Edward C. P. Edwards & Alex Doucas
1990	Kenton Jernigan & Jamie Bentley
1991	Kenton Jernigan & Jamie Bentley
1992	Todd Binns & Thomas E. Page
1993	Alan Grant & Edward C. P. Edwards
1994	William Doyle & Edward C. P. Edwards
1995	Kenton Jernigan & Jeremy Fraiberg
1997	Gary Waite & Jamie Bentley
1998	Todd Binns & Jamie Bentley
1999	Scott Dulmage & Dean Brown
2001	Willie Hosey & Jamie Bentley
2002	Gary Waite & Damien Mudge
2003	Gary Waite & Damien Mudge

=== Cambridge Club ===
Year	Winner
1973	Peter Martin & Gordon D. H. Anderson
1974	Mohibullah Khan & Gul Khan
1975	Michael J. Pierce & Maurice Heckscher, II
1976	Michael J. Pierce & Maurice Hechscher, II
1977	Peter Briggs & Ralph E. Howe
1978	Mohibullah Khan & Clive Caldwell
1979	Mohibullah Khan & Clive Caldwell
1980	Peter Briggs & Ralph E. Howe
1981	Michael J. Pierce & Thomas E. Page
1982	Michael J. Pierce & Thomas E. Page
1983	Peter Briggs & Mark Talbott
1984	Lawrence S. Heath, III & Aziz Khan
1985	Lawrence S. Heath, III & Aziz Khan
1986	David C. Johnson, III & Edward C. P. Edwards
1987	Todd Binns & Thomas E. Page
1988	Todd Binns & Thomas E. Page
1989	Alan Grant & Edward C. P. Edwards
1990	Todd Binns & Thomas E. Page
1991	Alan Grant & Edward C. P. Edwards
1992	Kenton Jernigan & Jamie Bentley
1993	Scott Dulmage & Gary Waite
1994	Kenton Jernigan & Jamie Bentley
1995	Gary Waite & Jamie Bentley
1996	Gary Waite & Jamie Bentley
1998	Todd Binns & Willie Hosey
1999	Gary Waite & Damien Mudge
2000	Willie Hosey & Jonathon Power
2001	Gary Waite & Mark Chaloner
2002	Gary Waite & Stewart Boswell

=== Gold Racquet ===
Year	Winner
1930	W Jay Iselin & Hugo Fleury
1931	E. D. Pratt & Lanthrop S. Haskins
1932	D. Lee Norris & Lanthrop S. Haskins
1933	E. Maxwell & W. Stapleton Wonham
1935	D. Lee Norris & Sydney P. Clark
1936	B. Terry & M. M. MacLeod
1937	D. Lee Norris & W Mifflin Large
1938	J. Lawrence Pool & Beekman H. Pool
1939	D. Lee Norris & Clifford Sutter
1940	D. Lee Norris & Clifford Sutter
1941	W B. Admit & David P. McElroy
1942	William T. Ketcham, Jr. & M. Donald Grant
1945	William E. Slack & H. Hunter Lott, Jr.
1946	W. B. Admit & David P. McElroy
1947	W. B. Admit & David P. McElroy
1948	William T. Ketcham, Jr. & H. Hunter Lott, Jr.
1949	William T. Ketcham, Jr. & H. Hunter Lott, Jr.
1950	John B. Russell & Richard Remsen, Jr.
1951	Carlton M. Badger & James M. Ethridge, DI
1952	Carlton M. Badger & James M. Ethridge, III
1953	John B. Russell & Richard Remsen, Jr.
1954	Jolm B. Russell & Richard Remsen, Jr.
1955	John B. Russell & Richard Remsen, Jr.
1956	James H. Whitmoyer & Howard A. Davis
1957	Paul Steele, Jr. and IL William Danforth
1958	G. Diehl Mateer, Jr. & John F. Hentz
1959	Paul Steele, Jr. & R. William Danforth
1960	Paul Steele, Jr. & R. William Danforth
1961	Paul Steele, Jr. & James F. Ethridge, III
1962	Christian C. F. Spahr, Jr. & Claude Beer
1963	Carlton M. Badger & James M. Ethridge, III
1964	Howard A. Davis & James H. Wlutmoyer
1965	Christian C. F. Spahr, Jr. & Claude Beer
1966	Peter Martin & Kerry Martin
1967	Stephen T. Vehslage & Ramsay IV. Vehslage
1968	Ian McAvity & David Pemberton-Smith
1969	Michael J. Pierce & Peter Pierce
1970	G. Diehl Mateer, Jr. & James W. Zug
1971	Michael J. Pierce & Peter Pierce
1972	Romer Holleran & Maurice Heckscher, II
1973	John Swann & Peter Hall
1974	Michael J. Pierce & Maurice Heckscher, II
1975	Michael J. Pierce & Maurice Heckscher, II
1976	Michael J. Pierce & Maurice Heckscher, II
1977	Michael J. Pierce & Jay Gillespie
1978	Lawrence S. Heath, DI Sc John R. Reese
1979	Lawrence S. Heath, DI & John R. Reese
1980	Lawrence S. Heath, DI & John R. Reese
1981	Lawrence S. Heath, III & John R.. Reese
1982	Michael J. Pierce & Ralph E. Howe
1983	Lawrence S. Heath, DI & John R. Reese
1984	Lawrence S. Heath, DI & David C. Johnson, III
1985	Victor Harding & Ralph E. Howe
1986	Michael J. Pierce & Jay Gillespie
1987	Hugh Labossier & William Doyle
1988	Peter S. Briggs & William Doyle
1989	Peter S. Briggs & William Doyle
1990	David Proctor & George Leinmon, Jr.
1991	David Proctor & George Lenunon, Jr.
1992	Michael J. Pierce & Richard Sheppard
1993	Lawrence S. Heath, III & Stuart Grodman
1994	Frank J. Stanley, W & Jamie Bentley
1995	Jonathon R.. Foster & Morris Clothier
1996	Frank J. Stanley, IV & J. D. Cregan
1997	Gary Waite & Andrew Slater
1998	Gary Waite & Andrew Slater
1999	Eric Vlcek & Morris Clothier
2000	Eric Vlcek & Morris Clothier
2001	Eric Vlcek & Thomas W. Harrity
2002	Steve Scharff & Thomas W. Harrity

=== Buffalo Invitational ===
Year	Winner
1955	John B. Russell & Richard Remsen
1956	Ray Widelski & Louis Schaefer
1957	Ray Widelski & Louis Schaefer
1959	Victor Elmaleh & David C. Johnson, Jr.
1960	Paul B. Steele & R.. William Danforth
1961	James H. Whmnoyer & Howard A. Davis
1962	Christian C. F. Spahr & Claude Beer
1963	Samuel P. Howe, III & IL William Danforth
1964	Samuel P. Howe, III & R. William Danforth
1965	Lome G. Main & John Foy
1966	Victor Niederhoffer & Victor Elmaleh
1967	Ian McAvity & David Pemberton-Smith
1968	Ian McAvity & David Pemberton-Smith
1969	Larry O'Loughlin & David O'Loughlin
1970	Larry O'Loughlin & Anil Nayar
1971	Thomas M. Poor & Anil Nayar
1972	Thomas M. Poor & Maurice Heckscher, II
1973	Robert Hetherington & R. William Danforth
1974	Thomas M. Poor & Peter Hall
1975	Thomas M. Poor & Peter Hall
1976	Thomas M. Poor & Richard Roe
1977	Thomas M. Poor & Alexander Martin
1978	Thomas M. Poor & Alexander Martin
1979	Thomas M. Poor & Alexander Martin
1980	Thomas M. Poor & Alexander Martin
1981	Peter Hall & Jay Gillespie
1982	Thomas M. Poor & Peter Hall
1983	Thomas M. Poor & Jay Gillespie
1984	Victor Hardin & Steven McIntyre
1985	Thomas M. Poor & Steven Mdntytre
1986	Thomas M. Poor & Jay D. Umans
1987	John Boynton & Steven Hisey
1988	Charles P. Jacobs & Philip Barth, III
1989	Fred A. Reid & Alan Hunt
1990	Scott Ryan & Jay D. Umans
1991	Paul D. Assaiante & Gordon Anderson
1992	Joseph J. Fabiani & Thomas W. Harrity
1993	Paul Deratney & Taylor Fawcett
1994	D. Stevenson & W Meek
1995	Peter DeRose & Peter Maule
1996	Peter DeRose & Peter Maule
1997	M. Costigan & A. Hunt
1998	M. Costigan & A. Hunt
1999	Tyler Millard & Ken Flynn
2000	R. Smith & D. Friedman
2001	S. Leggat & S. Belman
2002	Michael Pirnak & Willie Hosey
