= 2002 Women's World Team Squash Championships =

Women's World Team 2002
- 13th World Women's Team Championship
- Location: Odense, Denmark
- Date(s): October 13–20, 2002

Results
- Champions: Australia
- Runners-up: England
- Third place: New Zealand

The 2002 Women's McWil Courtwall World Team Squash Championships was the women's edition of the 2002 World Team Squash Championships, organized by the World Squash Federation, held in Odense, Denmark from October 13 to 20, 2002.

== First round ==
=== Pool A ===
Team One	Team Two	Score
Australia	Canada	3-0
Australia	India	3-0
Australia	Spain	3-0
Australia	South Africa	3-0
South Africa	Spain	3-0
South Africa	India	3-0
South Africa	Canada	2-1
Canada	Spain	3-0
Canada	India	3-0
(Canada) Spain	India	2-1

Pos	Nation	Team	P	W	L	Pts
1	Australia	Sarah Fitzgerald, Natalie Grinham, Rachael Grinham, Robyn Cooper	4	4	0	8
2	South Africa	Claire Nitch, Sjeanne Cawdry, Farrah Sterne, Siyoli Lusaseni	4	3	1	6
3	Canada	Melanie Jans, Margo Green, Lauren Wagner, Carolyn Russell	4	2	2	4
4	Spain	Elisabet Sado, Olga Puigdemont, Laia Sans	4	1	3	2
5	India	Joshna Chinappa, Mekhala Subedar, Vaidehi Reddy	4	0	4	0

=== Pool B ===
Team One	Team Two	Score
England	Malaysia	3-0
England	Germany	3-0
England	(Republic of Ireland) Ireland	3-0
Malaysia	(Republic of Ireland) Ireland	3-0
Malaysia	Germany	3-0
Germany	(Republic of Ireland) Ireland	2-1

Pos	Nation	Team	P	W	L	Pts
1	England	Stephanie Brind, Linda Charman, Tania Bailey, Fiona Geaves	3	3	0	6
2	Malaysia	Sharon Wee, Tricia Chuah, Nicol David	3	2	1	4
3	Germany	Karin Beriere, Sabine Tillman (née Schöne), Simone Leifels, Jennifer Post	3	1	2	2
4	(Republic of Ireland) Ireland	Madeline Perry, Aisling Blake, Aisling McArdle	3	0	0	3

=== Pool C ===
Team One	Team Two	Score
New Zealand	Denmark	3-0
New Zealand	France	3-0
New Zealand	Japan	3-0
New Zealand	Netherlands	2-1
Netherlands	Japan	3-0
Netherlands	France	3-0
Netherlands	Denmark	2-1
France	Denmark	2-1
France	Japan	2-1
Denmark	Japan	2-1

Pos	Nation	Team	P	W	L	Pts
1	New Zealand	Carol Owens, Lara Petera, Shelley Kitchen, Sarah Cook	4	4	0	8
2	Netherlands	Vanessa Atkinson, Daphne Jelgersma, Annelize Naudé	4	3	1	6
3	France	Isabelle Stoehr, Corinne Castets, Laurence Bois	4	2	2	4
4	Denmark	Ellen Hamborg-Petersen, Julie Dorn-Jensen, Mette Jørgensen	4	1	3	2
5	Japan	Eri Tsuchida, Chinatsu Matsui, Yoriko Michishita	4	0	4	0

=== Pool D ===
Team One	Team Two	Score
Egypt	United States	3-0
Egypt	Hong Kong	3-0
Egypt	Austria	3-0
Egypt	Scotland	2-1
Scotland	Austria	3-0
Scotland	Hong Kong	3-0
Scotland	United States	3-0
Hong Kong	Austria	3-0
Hong Kong	United States	2-1
United States	Austria	3-0

Pos	Nation	Team	P	W	L	Pts
1	Egypt	Salma Shabana, Maha Zein, Omneya Abdel Kawy	4	4	0	8
2	Scotland	Pamela Nimmo, Wendy Maitland, Senga Macfie, Lisa McKenna	4	3	1	6
3	Hong Kong	Rebecca Chiu, Karen Lau, Christina Mak	4	2	2	4
4	United States	Julia Beaver, Latasha Khan, Shabana Khan, Meredeth Quick	4	1	3	2
5	Austria	Pamela Pancis, Ines Gradnitzer, Birgit Coufal, Sissi Colli	4	0	4	0

== Quarter finals ==
Date	Team One	Team Two	Score
Oct 17	Australia	Scotland	3-0
Oct 17	New Zealand	South Africa	2-1
Oct 17	Egypt	Malaysia	2-1
Oct 17	England	Netherlands	3-0

== Semi finals ==
Date	Team One	Team Two	Score
Oct 19	Australia	Egypt	3-0
Oct 19	England	New Zealand	2-1

== Third Place Play Off ==
Date	Team One	Team Two	Score
Oct 20	New Zealand	Egypt	2-1

== Final ==
Australia
2
FINAL
Odense, Denmark
20 October 2002

England
1

			1	2	3	4	5
1	(Australia) (England)	Sarah Fitzgerald; Linda Charman	2; 9	9; 2	9; 0	9; 1
2	(Australia) (England)	Natalie Grinham; Stephanie Brind	5; 9	9; 5	9; 6	9; 3
3	(Australia) (England)	Rachael Grinham; Tania Bailey	6; 9	2; 9

Preceded by England; 2000	Squash World Team; Denmark; 2002	Succeeded by Netherlands; 2004

== See also ==
- World Team Squash Championships
- World Squash Federation
- World Open (squash)
