= Squash at the 2015 Pan American Games – Men's team =

Squash – Men's team at the 2015 Pan American Games
- Venue: Exhibition Centre – Hall C
- Dates: July 14–17
- Competitors: 30 from 10 nations

Medalists
Gold medal	Shawn Delierre; Andrew Schnell; Graeme Schnell	Canada
Silver medal	Eric Gálvez; Arturo Salazar; César Salazar	Mexico
Bronze medal	Christopher Gordon; Christopher Hanson; Todd Harrity	United States
Bronze medal	Robertino Pezzota; Rodrigo Pezzota; Leandro Romiglio	Argentina

The men's team squash event of the 2015 Pan American Games was held from July 14–17 at the Exhibition Centre in Toronto. The defending Pan American Games champion Mexico finished runners-up to Canada.

== Schedule ==
All times are Central Standard Time (UTC-6).

Date	Time	Round
July 14, 2015	9:00	Round Robin
July 15, 2015	10:00	Round Robin
July 16, 2015	12:06	Quarterfinals
July 16, 2015	12:06	Places 7 to 10
July 16, 2015	17:30	Semifinals
July 17, 2015	17:30	Places 5 to 6
July 17, 2015	12:06	Places 7 to 10
July 17, 2015	19:45	Final

== Results ==
=== Round Robin ===
The round robin will be used as a qualification round. The ten teams will be split into groups of three or four. The top two teams from each group will advance to the first round of playoffs.

==== Pool A ====
Nation	Pld	W	L	GF	GA	PF	PA	Points
Mexico	3	3	0	21	8	276	182	6
Argentina	3	2	1	16	12	243	241	4
Peru	3	1	2	16	12	247	199	2
Guyana	3	0	3	3	24	146	290	0

==== Pool B ====
Nation	Pld	W	L	GF	GA	PF	PA	Points
Canada	2	2	0	17	5	227	159	4
Colombia	2	1	1	11	12	190	205	2
Ecuador	2	0	2	4	15	127	180	0

==== Pool C ====
Nation	Pld	W	L	GF	GA	PF	PA	Points
United States	2	2	0	18	1	206	87	4
Guatemala	2	1	1	7	14	137	204	2
Chile	2	0	2	5	15	145	197	0

=== Places 7 to 10 ===
Nation	Pld	W	L	GF	GA	PF	PA	Points
Peru	2	2	0	18	1	211	130	6
Chile	3	2	1	13	16	249	257	4
Ecuador	3	1	2	13	17	261	287	2
Guyana	2	0	2	5	15	153	200	0

=== Playoffs ===
Quarterfinals
B2	Colombia	0	0
C1	United States	3	3
C2	Guatemala	0	0
A2	Argentina	3	3

Semifinals
A1	Mexico	3	3
C1	United States	2	2
A2	Argentina	3	0	0
B1	Canada	1	3	3

Final
A1	Mexico	0	1
B1	Canada	3	3
Places 5 to 6
B2	Colombia	0	0
C2	Guatemala	3	3

== Final standings ==
Rank	Nation	Name
1st place, gold medalist(s)	Canada	Shawn Delierre; Andrew Schnell; Graeme Schnell
2nd place, silver medalist(s)	Mexico	Eric Gálvez; Arturo Salazar; César Salazar
3rd place, bronze medalist(s)	United States	Christopher Gordon; Christopher Hanson; Todd Harrity
3rd place, bronze medalist(s)	Argentina	Robertino Pezzota; Rodrigo Pezzota; Leandro Romiglio
5	Guatemala	Bryan Bonilla; Josué Enríquez; Mauricio Sedano
6	Colombia	Andrés Herrera; Miguel Ángel Rodríguez; Juan Camilo Vargas
7	Peru	Andrés Duany; Diego Elías; Alonso Escudero
8	Chile	Maximiliano Camiruaga; Sebastián Gallegos; Jaime Pinto
9	Ecuador	Juan Chacon; Ernesto Davila; Orlando Rodríguez
10	Guyana	Kristian Jeffrey; Jason-Ray Khalil; Sunil Seth
