= 2000 Women's World Team Squash Championships =

Squash competition

Women's World Team 2000
- 12th World Women's Team Championship
- Location: Sheffield, England
- Date: 17–25 November 2000

Results
- Champions: England
- Runners-up: Australia
- Third place: New Zealand

The 2000 Women's Eye Group World Team Squash Championships were held in Sheffield, England and took place from 17 November until 25 November 2000.

England won the title.

== Seeds ==
1. England
2. Australia
3. New Zealand
4. Egypt
5. Netherlands
6. Scotland
7. South Africa
8. Germany
9. Canada
10. France
11. Denmark
12. Hong Kong

== First round ==
=== Pool A ===
Date	Team One	Team Two	Score
19 Nov	England	Italy	3-0
19 Nov	Hong Kong	Brazil	2-1
20 Nov	England	Hong Kong	3-0
20 Nov	Italy	Brazil	0-3
21 Nov	England	Brazil	3-0
21 Nov	Italy	Hong Kong	0-3

Pos	Nation	Team	P	W	L	Pts
1	England	Stephanie Brind, Rebecca Macree, Linda Charman, Tania Bailey	3	3	0	6
2	Hong Kong	Rebecca Chiu, Karen Lau, Elsie Ng, Christina Mak	3	2	1	4
3	Brazil	Karen Redfern, Flavia Roberts, Alessandra Bello, Carmen Amazonas	3	1	2	2
4	Italy	Sonia Pasteris, Chiara Ferrari, Veronica Favero, Manuela Manetta	3	0	3	0

=== Pool B ===
Date	Team One	Team Two	Score
19 Nov	Australia	Wales	3-0
19 Nov	Denmark	Malaysia	2-1
20 Nov	Australia	Malaysia	3-0
20 Nov	Denmark	Wales	3-0
Nov 210	Australia	Denmark	3-0
21 Nov	Malaysia	Wales	3-0

Pos	Nation	Team	P	W	L	Pts
1	Australia	Sarah Fitzgerald, Natalie Grinham, Robyn Cooper, Laura Keating	3	3	0	6
2	Denmark	Ellen Petersen, Julie Dorn-Jensen, Line Hansen	3	2	1	4
3	Malaysia	Sharon Wee, Tricia Chuah, Cheryl David	3	1	2	2
4	Wales	Katrina Hogan, Hayley James, Anna Vaughan, Louise Griffiths	3	0	0	3

=== Pool C ===
Date	Team One	Team Two	Score
19 Nov	New Zealand	Spain	3-0
20 Nov	New Zealand	France	3-0
21 Nov	France	Spain	3-0

Pos	Nation	Team	P	W	L	Pts
1	New Zealand	Sarah Cook, Leilani Joyce, Shelley Kitchen, Lara Petera	2	2	0	4
2	France	Isabelle Stoehr, Corinne Castets, Mylene De Muylder	2	1	1	2
3	Spain	Natalia Meneu, Elisabet Sadò, Olga Puigdemont, Laia Sans	2	0	2	0

=== Pool D ===
Date	Team One	Team Two	Score
19 Nov	Egypt	Nigeria	w/o ^{1}
19 Nov	Canada	Switzerland	2-1
20 Nov	Egypt	Switzerland	3-0
20 Nov	Canada	Nigeria	w/o ^{1}
21 Nov	Egypt	Canada	3-0
21 Nov	Switzerland	Nigeria	w/o ^{1}

Pos	Nation	Team	P	W	L	Pts
1	Egypt	Salma Shabana, Maha Zein, Omneya Abdel Kawy	3	3	0	6
2	Canada	Melanie Jans, Marnie Baizley, Lauren Wagner, Carolyn Russell	3	2	1	4
3	Switzerland	Agnes Muller, Manuela Zehnder, Olivia Hauser	3	1	2	2
4	Nigeria		3	0	3	0

^{1} Nigeria were forced to withdraw after the draw due to visa problems.

=== Pool E ===
Date	Team One	Team Two	Score
19 Nov	Netherlands	(Republic of Ireland) Ireland	3-0
20 Nov	Germany	Netherlands	2-1
21 Nov	Germany	(Republic of Ireland) Ireland	3-0

Pos	Nation	Team	P	W	L	Pts
1	Germany	Sabine Schöne, Daniela Grzenia, Karin Beriere	2	2	0	4
2	Netherlands	Vanessa Atkinson, Denise Sommers, Daphne Jelgersma, Bea De Dreu	2	1	1	2
3	(Republic of Ireland) Ireland	Madeline Perry, Aisling Blake, Anna McGeever, Eleanor Lapthorne	2	0	2	0

=== Pool F ===
Date	Team One	Team Two	Score
19 Nov	South Africa	United States	3-0
19 Nov	Scotland	Japan	3-0
20 Nov	South Africa	Japan	3-0
20 Nov	Scotland	United States	3-0
21 Nov	South Africa	Scotland	2-1
21 Nov	Japan	United States	0-3

Pos	Nation	Team	P	W	L	Pts
1	South Africa	Claire Nitch, Sjeanne Cawdry, Angelique Clifton-Parks	3	3	0	6
2	Scotland	Pamela Nimmo, Wendy Maitland, Senga Macfie, Susan Dalrymple	3	2	1	4
3	United States	Ivy Pochoda, Louisa Hall, Margaret Elias, Shirin Kaufman	3	1	2	2
3	Japan	Eri Tsuchida, Naoko Nishio, Yuka Goto, Yoriko Hamada	3	0	3	0

== Second round ==
Date	Team One	Team Two	Score
22 Nov	Australia	(Republic of Ireland) Ireland	3-0
22 Nov	New Zealand	Hong Kong	3-0
22 Nov	South Africa	Brazil	3-0
22 Nov	England	Malaysia	3-0
22 Nov	Egypt	Denmark	2-1
22 Nov	Canada	Netherlands	2-1
22 Nov	Germany	Switzerland	2-1
22 Nov	France	Scotland	2-1

== Quarter-finals ==
Date	Team One	Team Two	Score
23 Nov	Australia	France	3-0
23 Nov	New Zealand	South Africa	2-1
23 Nov	Egypt	Germany	2-1
23 Nov	England	Canada	3-0

== Semi-finals ==
Date	Team One	Team Two	Score
24 Nov	Australia	Egypt	2-1
24 Nov	England	New Zealand	2-1

== Third-place play-off ==
Date	Team One	Team Two	Score
25 Nov	New Zealand	Egypt	2-1

== Final ==
England
2
FINAL
Hallamshire Tennis & Squash Club, Sheffield, England
25 November 2000

Australia
1

			1	2	3	4	5
1	(England) (Australia)	Linda Charman; Sarah Fitzgerald	5; 9	0; 9	4; 9
2	(England) (Australia)	Tania Bailey; Natalie Grinham	9; 1	9; 0	9; 0
3	(England) (Australia)	Stephanie Brind; Robyn Cooper	9; 6	9; 4	0; 9	9; 3

== See also ==
- World Team Squash Championships
- World Squash Federation
- World Open (squash)

Preceded by Germany; 1998	Squash World Team; England; 2000	Succeeded by Denmark; 2002
