= Jamie Crombie =

Canadian and American squash player (born 1965)

Personal information
- Born: September 13, 1965 (age 60) Vermont, United States

Sport
Medal record
Men's squash
Representing Canada
Pan American Championships
Gold medal – first place	1993 Medellin	Singles
Silver medal – second place	1993 Medellin	Team
Pan American Games
Bronze medal – third place	1995 Mar del Plata	Singles
Gold medal – first place	1995 Mar del Plata	Team
Gold medal – first place	1999 Winnipeg	Team
Representing United States
Pan American Championships
Silver medal – second place	2005 San Salvador	Team
Gold medal – first place	2006 Medellin	Doubles

Jamie Crombie (born September 13, 1965 in Vermont, United States) is a former professional male squash player who represented Canada and later the United States during his career. He represented Canada at the World Team Squash Championships in each of 1985, 1987, 1989, 1991, 1993 and 1995. He reached a career-high PSA ranking of World No. 32 in March 1995.

He was a member of the Canadian National Team for a remarkable 15 years from 1984 to 1999. In 1993 at the Pan American Championships he won the Individual Gold (and Team Silver) and in 1995 at the Pan American Games he won the Individual Bronze and the Team Gold along with Gary Waite, Jonathon Power and Sabir Butt. Once more at the 1999 Pan American Games in Winnipeg Jamie helped Canada win Team Gold along with Graham Ryding and Kelly Patrick.

Jamie then moved to the United States where he became a member of the US National Team for another 4 years from 2003 to 2006 for a total of 19 years playing at the National Team level.

In 2005 he helped Team USA reach Silver at the Pan American Championships in El Salvador and he won Gold in the World Master Games Men's Singles 40+. In 2006, together with Michael Puertas, he won Gold in Doubles at the Pan American Championships in Colombia.

He was a 2x US Masters Champion: first in 2014 in the Men's 40+ and again in 2016 for the Men's 50+.

In February 1994, Jamie became the No. 1 squash player in Canada and in January 2005 he reached No. 1 in the US.

In May 1985 at the Mennen Club Classic in Toronto, Jamie won the first game in his match against then World No. 1 Jahangir Khan. Then at the 1995 US Open Jamie was up 2–1 in his match against World No. 1 Jansher Khan before losing in 5.

Over his career, Jamie accumulated 17 Canadian Provincial Men's Open Squash titles (5 Alberta, 5 Manitoba, 3 Ontario, 3 Quebec and 1 Saskatchewan) as well as 19 PSA Tour victories, including the 1989 Curzon North American Opener, where he beat Gary Waite (future World No. 12), and the 1994 Albuquerque Open where he beat Jonathon Power (future World No. 1).

On May 13, 2023, Jamie was inducted into the Canadian Hall of Fame for Squash.
