= Squash at the 2015 Pan American Games – Men's singles =

Squash – Men's singles at the 2015 Pan American Games
- Venue: Exhibition Centre – Hall C
- Dates: July 11 - July 13
- Competitors: 21 from 12 nations

Medalists
Gold medal	Miguel Ángel Rodríguez	Colombia
Silver medal	Diego Elías	Peru
Bronze medal	Shawn Delierre	Canada
Bronze medal	César Salazar	Mexico

The men's singles squash event of the 2015 Pan American Games was held from July 11–13 at the Exhibition Centre in Toronto. The Pan American Games champion is Miguel Rodríguez of Colombia successfully defended his title.

The athletes were drawn into elimination stage draw. An athlete who lost a match was no longer able to compete. Each match was contested as the best of five games. A game was won when one side first scored 11 points. A point was awarded to the winning side of each rally. If the score became 10-all, the side which gained a two-point lead first, won that game.

== Schedule ==
All times are Central Standard Time (UTC-6).

Date	Time	Round
July 11, 2015	10:07	First Round
July 11, 2015	13:20	Second Round
July 12, 2015	10:53	Quarterfinals
July 12, 2015	19:53	Semifinals
July 13, 2015	18:41	Final

== Results ==
=== Finals ===
Semifinals
Miguel Ángel Rodríguez (COL)	11	11	11
Shawn Delierre (CAN)	7	8	8
Diego Elías (PER)	7	8	11	11	11
César Salazar (MEX)	11	11	5	0	0

Final
Miguel Ángel Rodrígue (COL)	11	3	12	11
Diego Elías (PER)	9	11	10	8

=== Top half ===
First Round
J Chacon (ECU)	12	2	9	11	9
M Camiruaga (CHI)	10	11	11	9	11
A Escudero (PER)	11	11	11
J Chapman (IVB)	7	7	2
S Seth (GUY)	11	11	11
M Sedano (GUA)	9	9	5

Second Round
M Rodríguez (COL)	11	11	11
M Camiruaga (CHI)	8	4	3
L Romiglio (ARG)	6	10	11	11	11
A Salazar (MEX)	11	12	9	3	9
T Harrity (USA)	11	11	11
A Escudero (PER)	3	8	5
S Seth (GUY)	3	8	8
S Delierre (CAN)	11	11	11

Quarterfinals
M Rodríguez (COL)	11	14	4	11
L Romiglio (ARG)	9	12	11	6
T Harrity (USA)	8	11	10	9
S Delierre (CAN)	11	6	12	11

Semifinals
M Rodríguez (COL)	11	11	11
S Delierre (CAN)	7	8	8

=== Bottom half ===
First Round
E Davila (ECU)	11	4	6
J Pinto (CHI)	13	11	11
N Caballero (PAR)	11	11	11
J-R Khalil (GUY)	2	5	4

Second Round
D Elías (PER)	11	11	11
J Pinto (CHI)	0	4	6
J Enríquez (GUA)	11	7	2	2
C Gordon (USA)	4	11	11	11
R Pezzota (ARG)	11	11	9	11
A Schnell (CAN)	9	7	11	4
N Caballero (PAR)	6	4	7
C Salazar (MEX)	11	11	11

Quarterfinals
D Elías (PER)	11	11	11
C Gordon (USA)	9	7	9
R Pezzota (ARG)	7	16	5	14	9
C Salazar (MEX)	11	14	11	12	11

Semifinals
D Elías (PER)	7	8
C Salazar (MEX)	11	11

== Final standings ==
Rank	Name	Nation
1st place, gold medalist(s)	Miguel Ángel Rodríguez	Colombia
2nd place, silver medalist(s)	Diego Elías	Peru
3rd place, bronze medalist(s)	Shawn Delierre	Canada
3rd place, bronze medalist(s)	César Salazar	Mexico
5	Robertino Pezzota	Argentina
5	Leandro Romiglio	Argentina
5	Christopher Gordon	United States
5	Todd Harrity	United States
9	Andrew Schnell	Canada
9	Maximiliano Camiruaga	Chile
9	Jaime Pinto	Chile
9	Josué Enríquez	Guatemala
9	Sunil Seth	Guyana
9	Arturo Salazar	Mexico
9	Nicolas Caballero	Paraguay
9	Alonso Escudero	Peru
17	Juan Chacon	Ecuador
17	Ernesto Davila	Ecuador
17	Mauricio Sedano	Guatemala
17	Jason-Ray Khalil	Guyana
17	Joe Chapman	British Virgin Islands
