= Diehl Mateer =

American hardball squash and tennis player

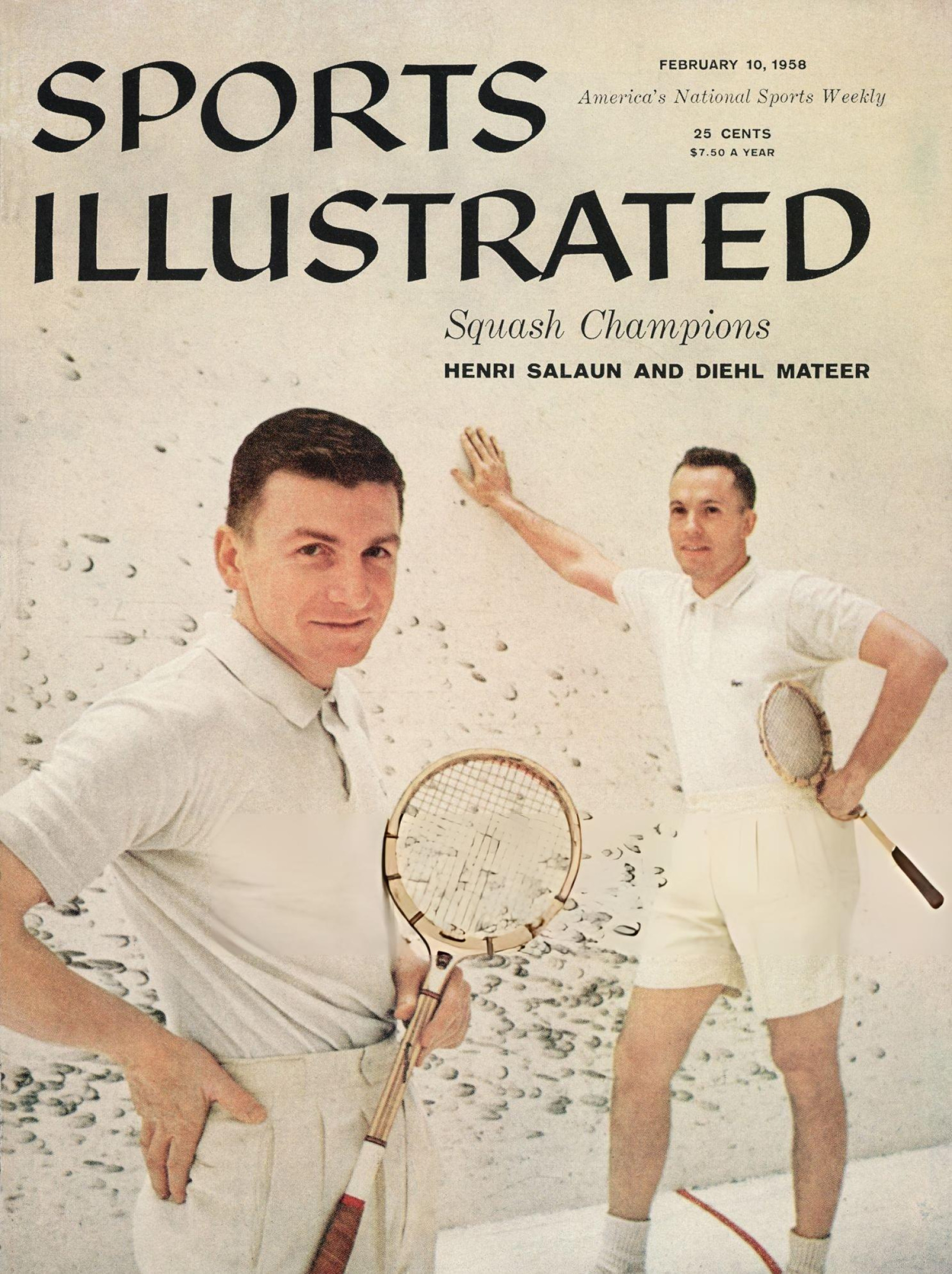
Diehl Mateer with Henri Salaun

G. (George) Diehl Mateer II (June 4, 1928 – September 22, 2012) was an American hardball squash player and tennis player.

== Squash ==
He was one of the leading squash players in the United States in the 1950s and 1960s. He is the only amateur player to have won two US Open squash titles (in 1955 and 1959). He also won three U.S. National Singles titles between 1954 and 1960.

He won a record 11 U.S. National Doubles titles between 1949 and 1966. He was runner-up at the US national doubles championship on nine further occasions (three of those times with his son Gil – his sons Gil and Drew won five national titles in all, including one together in 1986). In 1968, he and Ralph Howe made it to the finals in the US squash national doubles championships, but were defeated there by 23-year-old Victor Niederhoffer and 49-year-old Victor Elmaleh, who were playing together for the first time in the national championship.

Diehl also won two intercollegiate titles. He did not compete in the two other years that the intercollegiates were held due to a conflict (it being the same weekend as the US National Doubles, that he won that year).

== Tennis ==
As a younger boy, Mateer was noted for his tennis. He was a Haverford College tennis team leader and member of a graduating class that accumulated four successive Middle Atlantic League championships and a four-year record of 45–6 while at Haverford.

In tennis, Mateer reached the second round of the 1951 U.S. National Championships and lost in the first round in 1948.

He coached the Haverford College squash club team in the late 1970s.

== Honors ==
Mateer was inducted into the United States Squash Racquets Association Hall of Fame in 2000, the initial year. He is also a member of the US Intercollegiate Hall of Fame, the Episcopal Academy Hall of Fame, the Maryland Squash Hall of Fame, and the Haverford College Glasser Hall of Achievement.

== Personal life ==
Mateer married Joan Sommer and had five children: G. Diehl III, Andrew (Drew), Gilbert (Gil), Carver Severance, and Jeffrey (Jeff).
