= Squash Doubles =

Type of racket sport gameplay

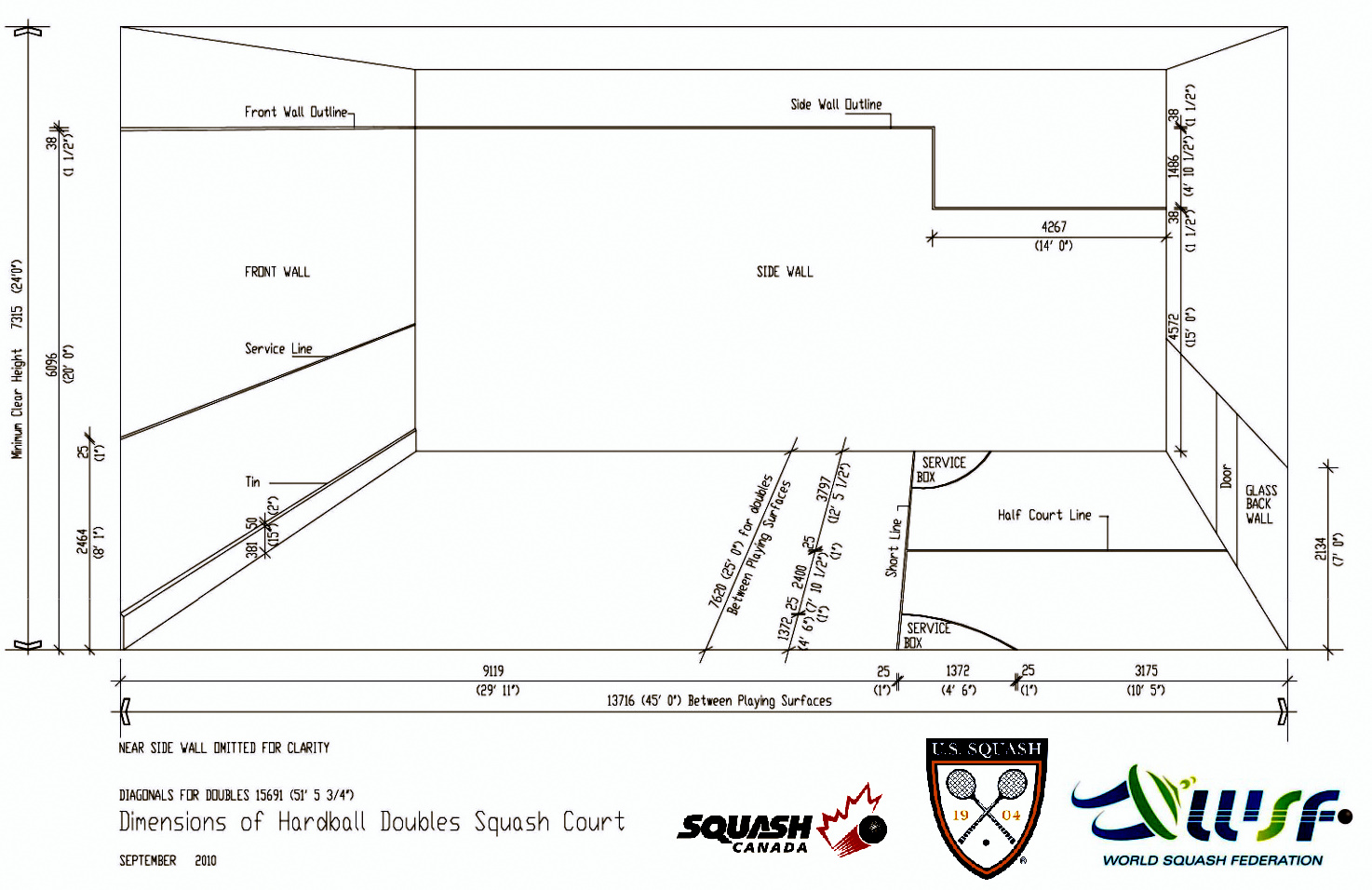
Squash Doubles Court Specifications

Squash Doubles is a variant of the racket sport squash played by four people in two-person teams. Doubles squash was first played at the Racquet Club of Philadelphia in 1907. Today there are four major doubles organizations overseeing the sport in North America and more than 15,000 players: Squash Canada, U.S. Squash, the ISDA (International Squash Doubles Association) and the WDSA (Women's Doubles Squash Association). The four groups organize and oversee the management of all aspects of doubles including junior and adult play from beginner to elite professional competition. In addition, the four organizations collaborate in efforts to grow and promote the game.

In addition to the organizations mentioned above, the SDA (Squash Doubles Association) provides tournament support, player rankings and broadcasting of tournaments played across the US and Canada.

There are more than 165 courts in North America. The sport is played year round and courts are located in every major region. There are national championships offered for all types of doubles players with tournaments taking place every weekend during the season.

Barbados, Malaysia, Myanmar, Scotland, Singapore and Thailand also have doubles courts.

Professional doubles has seen incredible growth. Since rebranding in 2000, the men's tour (ISDA) has grown to more than 20 events and $750,000 in prize money annually. The women's tour (WDSA), formed in 2007, is approaching $100,000 and recently hosted a $50,000 event in New York City. These tours partner with urban squash programs for kids in underserved communities and contribute tens of thousands of dollars annually to the programs throughout the United States.

== Courts ==
With double the number of players, the doubles court needs to be significantly bigger than a singles court. The doubles court should measure 25 feet wide by 45 feet long and have a ceiling height of at least 24 feet but preferably 26.

== Ball ==
Dunlop Sport makes a standard ball used for all official sanctioned tournaments.

== Scoring ==
The process of scoring in doubles squash is based on playing the best 3 out of 5 games. Each of the games played is up to 15 points. Doubles squash is unlike other racket sports, there is no need to continue playing until one team gains a two-point advantage.

== U.S. Squash ==
Squash doubles in the United States started in October 1907 and was standardized in the 1930s. U.S. SQUASH started the men's and women's National Championships in 1933. Professional doubles was started in 1938 and a viable tour was created in the late 1970s. The United States and Canada alternate hosting the World Doubles Championship every two years. The first was held in 1981 in Toronto and was sanctioned by all three North American squash associations and the WSF (known then as the International Squash Racquets Federation). By 2010, eight National Doubles Championships were held in the United States with more than 800 players vying for 36 different titles. It is estimated there are now 10,000 doubles players in the United States. New York and Philadelphia have active doubles leagues for both men and women of all abilities.

== Squash Canada ==
Squash doubles has been played in Canada since the 1920s. There are currently 36 courts in the country (plus one under construction), located in the five provinces which include over 90% of Canada's population. The National Championships were first played in 1934 and have been played every year since, with the exception of 1938. Canada hosts five National Championships with over 300 players competing for 24 different titles. Provincial Championships are held in 4 of the 5 provinces with over 1100 players participating in doubles leagues weekly across the country. It is estimated there are now more than 4,000 players in Canada who play doubles regularly.

== International Events ==
=== The Lapham-Grant Trophy ===
The Lapham-Grant Trophy is an annual singles and doubles event contested between the United States and Canada. The doubles component has been held annually since 1945. The location rotates between the U.S. and Canada, and features the top singles and doubles players from each country. It is the oldest international doubles contest in the world.

=== World squash doubles ===
The World Squash Doubles Championship has been held in North America since 1981 when it was sanctioned by the International Squash Racquets Federation. It has been held bi-annually since 1994 where it has alternated with the World Softball Doubles. In its most recent format, teams enter through their national governing body and the event is sanctioned by the WSF. Country's who have competed include Australia, Canada, England, India, Ireland, New Zealand, Pakistan, Scotland and U.S.A.

=== Copa-Wadsworth ===
Similar to the Lapham-Grant, the Copa-Wadsworth is an annual event that pits the United States versus Mexico, their neighbor to the south. It regularly has a doubles component and has been held since 1990.

=== The Can Am Cup ===
Canada and the United States compete every second year for the Can-Am Cup. It is a doubles squash competition between the United States and Canada, played every other year, in a “Ryder Cup” type format. The first event was held in Boston, MA in October 2008. It brings together the best men's and women's doubles squash players from across North America in a team format in Open and age class categories. In Toronto in October 2010 over 50 elite players from each country participated.

== Men's Professional Doubles ==
Professional doubles started in 1938 at Heights Casino in Brooklyn, NY. It had a viable tour starting in the late 1970s with events located in both the United States and Canada. In 2000 the doubles pro tour rebranded itself with the name International Squash Doubles Association, and in 2012 as The Squash Doubles Association Pro Tour (SDA Pro Tour). It is the governing body responsible for the world professional squash doubles tour and will celebrate its 75th anniversary of professional doubles in 2013. As of August 2019, John Russell is the number 1 ranked player in the world.

Chris Walker (ENG) – #4
Martin Heath (SCO) – #4
Mark Chaloner (ENG) – #7
Paul Price (AUS) – #4
Brett Martin (AUS) – #4

== Women's Professional Doubles ==
Since the Women's Doubles Squash Association formed in 2007, it has reached several of its goals. It has increased the number of women playing professional and amateur doubles, encouraging former college players, current teaching professionals and WISPA touring professionals to play.

In addition to the tour growth, with stops throughout the United States and Canada, the WDSA has helped foster and build women's doubles on the amateur level which has been achieved through pro am tournaments and Under 30 events at local clubs.

The WDSA, corporate partners, patrons and membership have established relationships with local charities throughout the United States – City Squash, Metro Squash, Mile High Squash and Squash Haven – all urban squash programs.

Top international female singles players who have made the successful transition to doubles and their highest WISPA ranking:

Natalie Grainger (USA) – #1
Narelle Krizek (AUS) – #23
Suzy Peirrepont (ENG) – #25
Amanda Sohby (USA) – #17 (World Junior Champion)
