= Rafael Alarcon =

Rafael Alarcon is the name of:

- Rafael Alarçón (born 1977), Brazilian squash player
- Rafael Alarcón (golfer) (born 1958), Mexican golfer
