= Pezzota =

Pezzota is an Italian surname. Notable people with the surname include:

- Robertino Pezzota (born 1983), Argentinian squash player
- Rodrigo Pezzota (born 1984), Argentinian squash player
