= Squash at the 2011 Pan American Games – Men's doubles =

Squash – Men's doubles at the 2011 Pan American Games
- Venue: Squash Complex
- Dates: October 15–16

Medalists
Gold medal	Arturo Salazar; Eric Gálvez	Mexico
Silver medal	Christopher Gordon; Julian Illingworth	United States
Bronze medal	Esteban Casarino; Nicolas Caballero	Paraguay
Bronze medal	Hernán D'Arcangelo; Robertino Pezzota	Argentina

The men's doubles squash event of the 2011 Pan American Games will be held from October 15–16 at the Squash Complex in Guadalajara.

== Draw ==
First Round
V De Lima (Brazil) R Fernandes (BRA)	w/o
J Pinto (Chile) M Camiruaga (CHI)
A Duany (Peru) Diego Elías (PER)
E Casarino (Paraguay) N Caballero (PAR)	w/o

Quarterfinals
A Salazar (Mexico) E Gálvez (MEX)	11	11
B Bonilla (Guatemala) J Mendez (GUA)	4	3
H D'Arcangelo (Argentina) R Pezzota (ARG)	8	11	11
V De Lima (Brazil) R Fernandes (BRA)	11	9	5
E Casarino (Paraguay) N Caballero (PAR)	11	4	11
A Vargas (Colombia) J Castilla (COL)	9	11	10
C Gordon (United States) J Illingworth (USA)	11	11
B Garcia (El Salvador) W Weisskopf (ESA)	8	9

Semifinals
A Salazar (Mexico) E Gálvez (MEX)	11	11
H D'Arcangelo (Argentina) R Pezzota (ARG)	4	6
E Casarino (Paraguay) N Caballero (PAR)	8	10
C Gordon (United States) J Illingworth (USA)	11	11

Final
A Salazar (Mexico) E Gálvez (MEX)	11	11
C Gordon (United States) J Illingworth (USA)	7	9
