= Ralph Howe =

American squash player (born 1941)

Ralph Eliot Howe III
Personal information
- Born: May 12, 1941 (age 85)
- Education: Yale University
- Relative: Sam Howe (older brother)

Sport
- Country: United States
- Sport: Hardball squash
- Titles: U.S. National Junior Champion (1960); Intercollegiate Champion (1962, 1963); U.S. National Singles Champion (1964); U.S. National Doubles Champion (6×, 1965–1976); United States Open Champion (1967)

Ralph Eliot Howe III (born 12 May 1941) is an American hardball squash player. He was one of the leading squash players in the United States in the 1960s and 1970s.

== Early life and education ==
Howe won the US national junior title in 1960. He then went on to win the intercollegiate title in 1962 and 1963 while at Yale University.

== Career ==
In 1964, Howe beat three former national champions on his way to winning the US national singles title. Howe also won the US national doubles title six times between 1965 and 1976.

In 1968, he and Diehl Mateer made it to the finals in the US squash national doubles championships, but were defeated there by 23-year-old Victor Niederhoffer and 49-year-old Victor Elmaleh, who were playing together for the first time in the national championship.

=== United States Open 1967 ===
In 1967, Howe won the United States Open. He defeated three-time defending-champion Mo Khan in the semi-finals, before going on to beat his older brother Sam Howe in the final, to become one of only four amateurs ever to win the most prestigious open tournament on the North American continent.

== Honors ==
Howe was inducted into the United States Squash Racquets Association Hall of Fame in 2002.
