= Squash at the 2003 Pan American Games =

- Venue: Santo Domingo
- Dates: August 10 - August 15

Squash competitions at the 2003 Pan American Games was held from August 10 to August 15 in Santo Domingo, Dominican Republic.

== Men's competition ==
=== Singles ===
Quarterfinals
Conceição (BRA)	5	9	9	9
Samper (COL)	9	5	7	2
Razik (CAN)	9	9	9
Alarçón (BRA)	3	2	2
Quick (USA)	9	9	3	4	9
Gutiérrez (ARG)	4	3	9	9	7
Ryding (CAN)	9	9	9
Walker (USA)	3	0	0

Semifinals
Conceição (BRA)	2	1	5
Razik (CAN)	9	9	9
Quick (USA)
Ryding (CAN)

Final
Razik (CAN)	2	9	10	1	9
Ryding (CAN)	9	0	9	9	6

RANK	FINAL RANKING
Gold medal	Shahier Razik (CAN)
Silver medal	Graham Ryding (CAN)
Bronze medal	Ronivaldo Conceição (BRA)
Bronze medal	Preston Quick (USA)

=== Team ===
Group A	Pld	W	L	GF	GA	PF	PA
Canada	4	4	0	12	0	–	–
Brazil	4	3	1	8	4	–	–
United States	4	2	2	6	6	–	–
Paraguay	4	1	3	4	8	–	–
El Salvador	4	0	4	0	12	–	–

Group B	Pld	W	L	GF	GA	PF	PA
Mexico	4	4	0	10	2	–	–
Argentina	4	3	1	8	4	–	–
Colombia	4	2	2	8	4	–	–
Ecuador	4	1	3	4	8	–	–
Dominican Republic	4	0	4	0	12	–	–

RANK	FINAL RANKING
Gold medal	Canada • Graham Ryding • Viktor Berg • Shahier Razik
Silver medal	Brazil • Rafael Alarçón • Ronivaldo Conceição • Luciano Barbosa
Bronze medal	Argentina • Jorge Gutiérrez • Robertino Pezzota • Rodrigo Pezzota
Bronze medal	Mexico • Jorge Baltazar • Armando Zarazua • Marcos Mendez

== Women's competition ==
=== Singles ===
Quarterfinals
Baizley (CAN)	4	9	9	9
Redfern (BRA)	9	6	0	3
Khan (USA)	9	9	9
Anderson (JAM)	2	4	5
Jans (CAN)	9	9	9
Roberts (BRA)	6	1	1
Terán (MEX)	9	10	9
West (JAM)	6	8	6

Semifinals
Baizley (CAN)	5	5	9	4
Khan (USA)	9	9	6	9
Jans (CAN)	9	10	5	2	10
Terán (MEX)	4	8	9	9	8

Final
Khan (USA)	9	9	3	9
Jans (CAN)	2	5	9	6

RANK	FINAL RANKING
Gold medal	Latasha Khan (USA)
Silver medal	Melanie Jans (CAN)
Bronze medal	Marnie Baizley (CAN)
Bronze medal	Samantha Terán (MEX)

=== Team ===
Group A	Pld	W	L	GF	GA	PF	PA
Canada	2	2	0	15	3	147	71
Mexico	2	1	1	8	10	114	125
Jamaica	2	0	2	7	14	118	156

Group B	Pld	W	L	GF	GA	PF	PA
United States	2	2	0	18	2	174	72
Brazil	2	1	1	11	9	137	111
Colombia	2	0	2	0	18	34	162

RANK	FINAL RANKING
Gold medal	United States • Latasha Khan • Louisa Hall • Meredeth Quick
Silver medal	Canada • Carolyn Russell • Marnie Baizley • Melanie Jans
Bronze medal	Mexico • Samantha Terán • Teresa Osorio • Diana Huerta
Bronze medal	Brazil • Karen Redfern • Patricia Pamplona • Flávia Roberts

== Medal table ==
Place	Nation	Gold medal	Silver medal	Bronze medal	Total
1	Canada	2	3	1	6
2	United States	2	0	1	3
3	Brazil	0	1	2	3
4	Mexico	0	0	3	3
5	Argentina	0	0	1	1
Total		4	4	8	16
