= Christopher Gordon (squash player) =

American squash player (born 1986)

Personal information
- Born: July 17, 1986 (age 40) New York City, New York, U.S.
- Height: 1.90 m (6 ft 3 in)
- Weight: 81 kg (179 lb)

Sport
- Country: United States
- Coached by: Andre Delhoste, David Pearson
- Retired: Active
- Racquet used: Tecnifibre

Men's singles
- Highest ranking: No. 44 (May, 2013)
- Current ranking: No. 126 (June, 2024)
- Title: 5
- Tour final: 10
Medal record
Men's squash
Representing the United States
Pan American Games
Silver medal – second place	2011 Guadalajara	Doubles
Bronze medal – third place	2011 Guadalajara	Team
Bronze medal – third place	2015 Toronto	Doubles
Bronze medal – third place	2011 Toronto	Team
Pan American Championship
Gold medal – first place	2008 Cuenca	Team
Gold medal – first place	2014 Toluca	Team
Silver medal – second place	2008 Cuenca	Individual
Bronze medal – third place	2014 Toluca	Team
- Updated on July, 2016

Christopher Gordon (born July 17, 1986) is a professional squash player who represents the United States.

== Biography ==
Gordon started his professional career at the James Baker & Associates 2002 Championships in Oklahoma, U.S. when he was just 15 years old. He reached a career-high world ranking of World No. 44 in May, 2013. He won a silver medal at the 2011 Pan American Games in the doubles with partner Julian Illingworth. His signature victory came in the 2012 U.S. Open in Philadelphia in the 1st round against Hisham Ashour in 5 games. Chris broke the PSA World Tour record for most tournament appearances with his appearance in the NTA Squash Classic being his 260th in a PSA tournament.

== Career statistics ==
=== PSA Titles (5) ===
All Results for Christopher Gordon in PSA World's Tour tournament

No.	Date	Tournament	Opponent in Final	Score in Final
1.	5 May 2009	Pro Squash Yokohama, Japan	(England) James Snell	11-7, 11-7, 12-10
2.	23 September 2011	El Salvador Open, El Salvador	(France) Joan Lezaud	11-5, 11-6, 11-9
3.	18 April 2013	NY Metro Open, US	(South Africa) Shaun Le Roux	10-12, 11-9, 11-3, 10-6 ret.
4.	13 November 2016	GoodLife Open, Canada	(Canada) Michael McCue	11-9, 11-6, 9-11, 11-9
5.	24 February 2018	British Virgin Island Open, British Virgin Island	(England) Adam Murrills	11-5, 11-6, 11-3

=== PSA Tour Finals (runner-up) (5) ===
No.	Date	Tournament	Opponent in Final	Score in Final
1.	2 August 2009	Ponta Grossa Open, Brazil	(Brazil) Rafael Alarçón	Unknown
2.	24 April 2010	Paraguay Open, Paraguay	(Brazil) Rafael Alarçón	7-11, 11-8, 7-11, 4-11
3.	25 July 2010	Inove Open, Brazil	(Brazil) Rafael Alarçón	10-12, 8-11, 6-11
4.	18 April 2016	Regatas Resistencia Open, Argentina	(Mexico) Arturo Salazar	8-11, 5-11, 9-11
5.	13 May 2017	Regatas Resistencia Open, Argentina	(Argentina) Robertino Pezzota	8-11, 7-11, 4-11

=== Junior Open Titles (1) ===
No.	Date	Tournament	Opponent in Final	Score in Final
1.	9 May 2004	German Junior U19 Open, Germany	(Germany) Simon Rösner	9-6, 5-9, 9-5, 9-2
