= Sono Osato =

American dancer and actress (1919–2018)

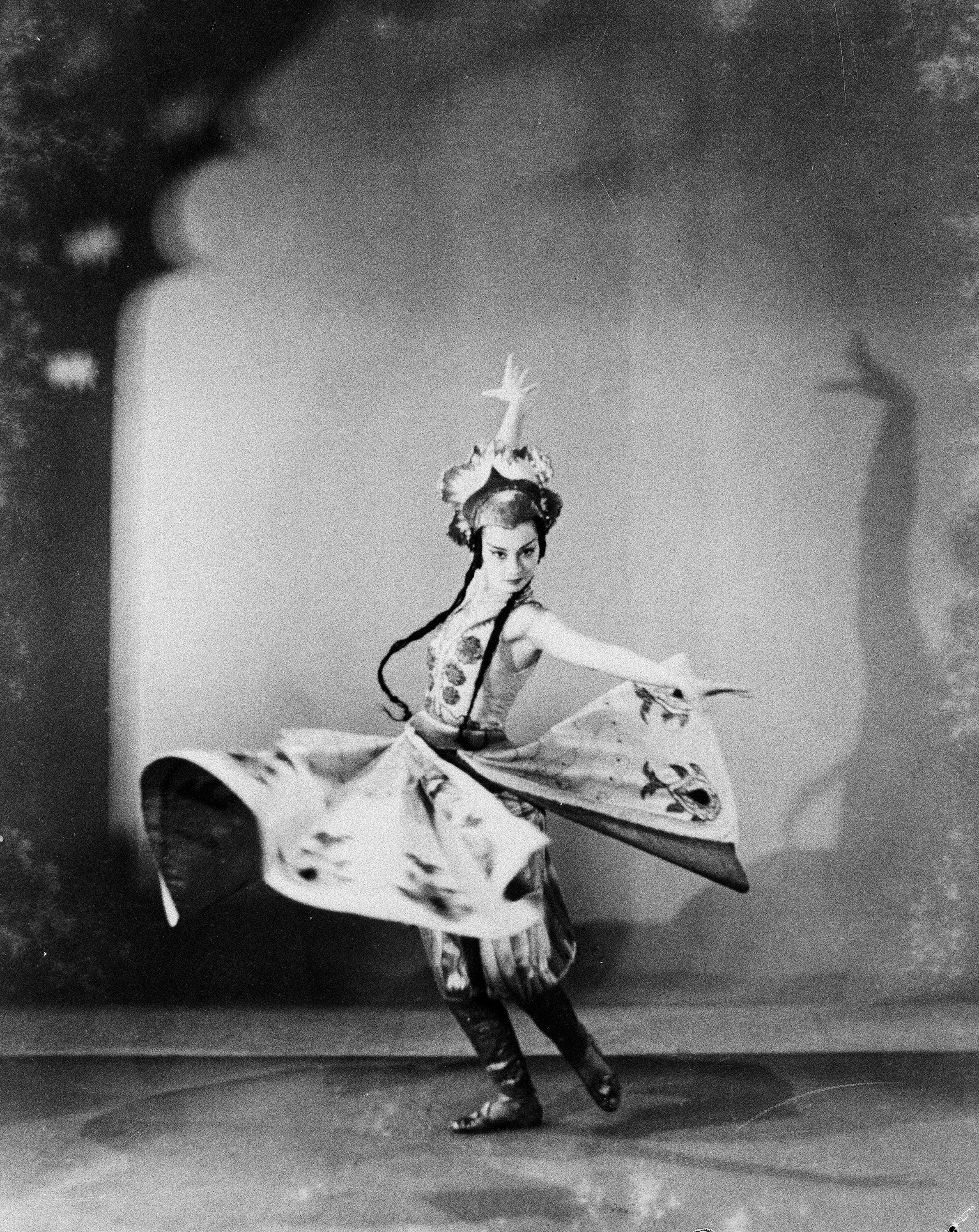
- Sono Osato in "Original Ballet Russe" performing at Theatre Royal, Sydney
- Born: August 29, 1919; Omaha, Nebraska, U.S.
- Died: December 26, 2018 (aged 99); New York City, U.S.
- Spouse: Victor Elmaleh (m. 1943; died 2014)
- Children: 2
- Career
- Former groups: Ballets Russes de Monte-Carlo American Ballet Theatre

Sono Osato (大里 ソノ, Osato Sono; August 29, 1919 – December 26, 2018) was an American dancer and actress.

== Early life ==
Sono Osato was born in Omaha, Nebraska. She was the oldest of three children of a Japanese father (Shoji Osato, 1885–1955) and a Canadian mother of French-Irish origin (Frances Fitzpatrick, 1897–1954). Her family moved to Chicago in 1925 in order to be closer to Frances' family, and Shoji opened a photography studio there. In 1927, when she was eight, Osato's mother took her and her sister to Europe for two years; while in Monte Carlo, they attended a performance of Cléopâtre by Sergei Diaghilev's famous Ballets Russes company, which inspired Osato to start ballet classes when she returned to Chicago in late 1929. She studied with prominent dancers Berenice Holmes and Adolph Bolm.

== Career ==
She performed with ballet companies Ballets Russe de Monte-Carlo and the American Ballet Theatre. As an actress, she starred alongside Frank Sinatra in the film The Kissing Bandit.

Osato began her career at the age of fourteen with Wassily de Basil's Ballets Russe de Monte-Carlo, which at the time was the world's most well known ballet company; she was the youngest member of the troupe, their first American dancer and their first dancer of Japanese descent. De Basil tried to persuade Osato to change her name to a Russian name, but she refused to do so. She spent six years touring the United States, Europe, Australia and South America with the company, leaving in 1941 as she felt her career was stagnating. She went to study at the School of American Ballet in New York City for six months, then joined the American Ballet Theatre as a dancer. While at the ABT, she danced roles in such ballets as Kenneth MacMillan's Sleeping Beauty, Antony Tudor's Pillar of Fire, and Bronislava Nijinska's The Beloved.

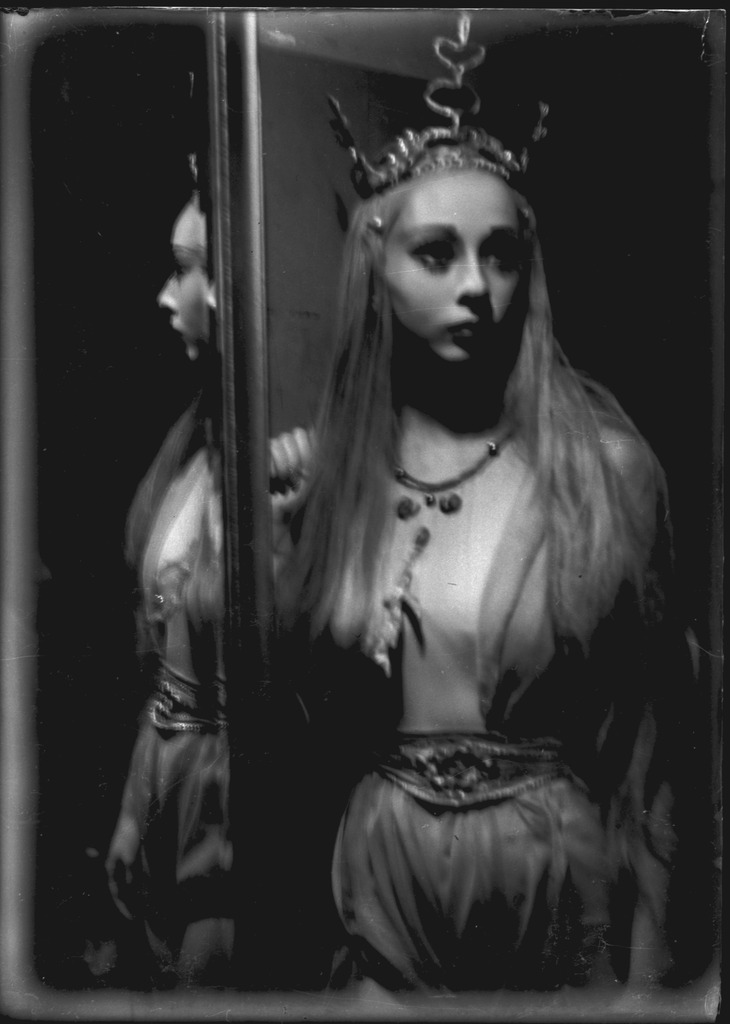
Osato in Francesca da Rimini costume, 1930s

As a musical theater performer, her Broadway credits included principal dancer in One Touch of Venus (a performance for which she received a Donaldson Award in 1943), Ivy Smith in the original On the Town, and Cocaine Lil in Ballet Ballads.

Following the Japanese attack on Pearl Harbor in 1941, Osato was encouraged to change her name to something more "American", and for a short time she used her mother's maiden name and performed as Sono Fitzpatrick. At around the same time, her father was arrested and detained in Chicago under the United States government's Japanese American Internment policy. In 1942, when the Ballet Theatre toured Mexico, Osato was unable to join the tour as Japanese Americans were barred from leaving the country, and she had several months without work. She was also unable to perform in California and other parts of the western United States when the company toured there later in the same year, as these states were deemed military areas and were off-limits for people of Japanese descent.

In the late 1940s and 1950s, Osato briefly pursued a career as an actress, appearing on Broadway in Peer Gynt, in the film The Kissing Bandit with Frank Sinatra, and in occasional guest appearances on television series such as, The Adventures of Ellery Queen (1950).

In 1980, Osato published an autobiography titled Distant Dances. In 2006, she founded the Sono Osato Scholarship Program in Graduate Studies at Career Transition For Dancers to help former dancers finance graduate work in both the professions and the liberal arts. In 2016, Thodos Dance Company in Chicago presented a dance production based on her life, titled Sono's Journey.

== Personal life ==
Osato married real estate developer Victor Elmaleh in 1943, and they had two sons. Elmaleh died in November 2014, aged 95.

Osato died at her home in Manhattan on December 26, 2018, at the age of 99. She was the aunt of the installation artist of the same name, Sono Osato.

== Filmography ==
Year	Title	Role	Notes
1948	The Kissing Bandit	Bianca	
