= Demer Holleran =

American squash player

Personal information
- Born: USA

Sport
- Country: United States
- Handedness: Right Handed
- Retired: Yes

Women's singles
- Title: 1
- Tour final: 5
Medal record
Women's squash
Representing the United States
Pan American Games
Silver medal – second place	1995 Mar del Plata	Singles
Silver medal – second place	1999 Winnipeg	Singles
- Updated on May 2018

Demer Holleran is a female American former professional squash player. She was American champion 9 times. She was inducted into the Pennsylvania Sports Hall of Fame. She received the Tournament of Champions Women's Leadership Award.
