= Squash at the 2007 Pan American Games =

- Venue: Miécimo da Silva Complex
- Dates: July 14–19

Squash competitions at the 2007 Pan American Games will be held from July 14 to July 19 at the Miécimo da Silva Complex in Rio de Janeiro, Brazil. There were four events, two for both men and women, with Canada (five medals) leading the competition.

== Men's competition ==
=== Singles ===
Quarterfinals
Delierre (CAN)	9	9	7	9
Baltazar (MEX)	7	3	9	3
Gálvez (MEX)	9	9	9
Samper (COL)	6	5	2
Illingworth (USA)	9	9	9
Razik (CAN)	3	6	6
Rodríguez (COL)	4	9	9	9
Alarçón (BRA)	9	1	7	5

Semifinals
Delierre (CAN)	3	3	7
Gálvez (MEX)	9	9	9
Illingworth (USA)	9	4	8	9	9
Rodríguez (COL)	7	9	10	1	6

Final
Gálvez (MEX)	9	9	9
Illingworth (USA)	0	4	7

RANK	FINAL RANKING
Gold medal	Eric Gálvez (MEX)
Silver medal	Julian Illingworth (USA)
Bronze medal	Shawn Delierre (CAN)
Bronze medal	Miguel Ángel Rodríguez (COL)

=== Team ===
Group A	Pld	W	L	GF	GA
Mexico	2	2	0	5	1
United States	2	1	1	3	3
El Salvador	2	0	2	1	5

Group B	Pld	W	L	GF	GA
Canada	2	2	0	5	1
Argentina	2	1	1	3	3
Guatemala	2	0	2	1	5

Group C	Pld	W	L	GF	GA
Brazil	3	3	0	8	1
Colombia	3	2	1	5	4
Peru	3	1	2	3	6
Venezuela	3	0	3	2	7

RANK	FINAL RANKING
Gold medal	Colombia • Javier Castilla • Miguel Ángel Rodríguez • Bernardo Samper
Silver medal	Canada • Robin Clarke • Shahier Razik • Shawn Delierre
Bronze medal	Mexico • Marcos Mendez • Eric Gálvez • Jorge Baltazar
Bronze medal	Brazil • Luciano Barbosa • Rafael Alarçón • Ronivaldo Conceição

== Women's competition ==
=== Singles ===
Quarterfinals
Grainger (USA)	9	9	9
Quibell (USA)	2	2	2
Reta (CAN)	9	9	9
Redfern (BRA)	2	3	2
Miller (CAN)	9	9	9
Serafini (BRA)	0	0	6
Terán (MEX)	9	9	9
Angulo (COL)	4	1	2

Semifinals
Grainger (USA)	9	9	9
Reta (CAN)	3	5	0
Miller (CAN)	10	9	3	6	9
Terán (MEX)	8	3	9	9	1

Final
Grainger (USA)	9	9	9
Miller (CAN)	1	0	1

RANK	FINAL RANKING
Gold medal	Natalie Grainger (USA)
Silver medal	Alana Miller (CAN)
Bronze medal	Runa Reta (CAN)
Bronze medal	Samantha Terán (MEX)

=== Team ===
Group A	Pld	W	L	GF	GA	PF	PA
United States	2	2	0	6	0	147	71
Colombia	2	1	1	2	4	114	125
Brazil	2	0	2	1	5	118	156

Group B	Pld	W	L	GF	GA	PF	PA
Canada	2	2	0	5	1	174	72
Mexico	2	1	1	4	2	137	111
Argentina	2	0	2	0	6	34	162

RANK	FINAL RANKING
Gold medal	Canada • Carolyn Russell • Runa Reta • Alana Miller
Silver medal	United States • Michelle Quibell • Natalie Grainger • Latasha Khan
Bronze medal	Colombia • Catalina Peláez • Silvia Angulo • Isabel Restrepo
Bronze medal	Mexico • Nayelly Hernández • Samantha Terán • Karina Herrera

== Medal table ==
Place	Nation	Gold medal	Silver medal	Bronze medal	Total
1	Canada	1	2	2	5
2	United States	1	2	0	3
3	Mexico	1	0	3	4
4	Colombia	1	0	2	3
5	Brazil	0	0	1	1
Total		4	4	8	16
