= Bernardo Samper =

Colombian squash player (born 1982)

Personal information
- Full name: Bernardo Samper García del Diestro
- Born: 8 April 1982 (age 44) Bogotá, Colombia
- Height: 1.70 m (5 ft 7 in)
- Weight: 65 kg (143 lb)

Sport
- Country: Colombia
- Turned pro: 2000
- Coached by: Lee Witham
- Retired: 2010
- Racquet used: Wilson K Factor

Men's singles
- Highest ranking: No. 57 (November 2007)
- Title: 3
- Tour final: 6
Medal record
Representing Colombia
Men's squash
Pan American Games
| Gold medal – first place | 2007 Rio de Janeiro | Team |
South American Games
| Gold medal – first place | 2010 Medellín | Doubles |
| Gold medal – first place | 2010 Medellín | Team |
| Bronze medal – third place | 2010 Medellín | Singles |

Bernardo Samper García del Diestro (born 8 April 1982 in Bogotá), known as Bernardo Samper, is a professional male squash player who represented Colombia. He reached a career-high world ranking of World No. 57 in November 2007 after having joined the Professional Squash Association (PSA) in 2000.
