= Shahier Razik =

Canadian squash player (born 1977)

Personal information
- Born: November 18, 1977 (age 48) Cairo, Egypt
- Height: 1.978 m (6 ft 6 in)
- Weight: 67 kg (148 lb)

Sport
- Country: Canada
- Handedness: Right Handed
- Turned pro: 1995
- Coached by: Mike Way
- Retired: Active
- Racquet used: Head

Men's singles
- Highest ranking: No. 20 (June 2008)
- Current ranking: No. 87 (July 2015)
- Title: 20
- Tour final: 37
Medal record
Men's squash
Representing Canada
Pan American Games
Gold medal – first place	2003 Santo Domingo	Singles
Gold medal – first place	2003 Santo Domingo	Team
Silver medal – second place	2011 Guadalajara	Team
Silver medal – second place	2007 Rio de Janeiro	Team
- Updated on July, 2015

Shahier Razik (born November 18, 1977, in Cairo, Egypt) is a professional squash player who represented Canada. He reached a career-high world ranking of World No. 20 in June 2008.
