= Ronivaldo Conceição =

Brazilian squash player (born 1972)

Personal information
- Full name: Ronivaldo Santos Conceição
- Born: July 8, 1972 (age 53) São Paulo, Brazil

Sport
Medal record
Men's squash
Representing Brazil
Pan American Games
Silver medal – second place	1999 Winnipeg	Team
Silver medal – second place	2003 Santo Domingo	Team
Bronze medal – third place	1999 Winnipeg	Singles
Bronze medal – third place	2003 Santo Domingo	Singles
Bronze medal – third place	2007 Rio de Janeiro	Team
South American Games
Silver medal – second place	2010 Medellín	Team
Bronze medal – third place	2010 Medellín	Doubles

Ronivaldo ("Roni") Santos Conceição (born July 8, 1972 in São Paulo) is a professional male squash player who represented Brazil during his career. He reached a career-high world ranking of World No. 95 in October 2006 after having joined the Professional Squash Association in 2001.
