= Jorge Baltazar =

Mexican squash player (born 1982)

Personal information
- Full name: Jorge Isaac Baltazar Ferreira
- Born: November 3, 1982 (age 43) Mexico City, Mexico
- Height: 1.68 m (5 ft 6 in)
- Weight: 64 kg (141 lb)

Sport
- Country: Mexico
- Turned pro: 2003
- Coached by: Marcos Mendez Guzman
- Retired: Active
- Racquet used: Prince

Men's singles
- Highest ranking: No. 46 (December 2008)
- Current ranking: No. 64 (December 2009)
Medal record
Men's squash
Representing Mexico
Pan American Games
Bronze medal – third place	2003 Santo Domingo	Team
Bronze medal – third place	2007 Rio de Janeiro	Team
- Updated on December 23, 2009

Jorge Isaac Baltazar Ferreira (born November 3, 1982, in Mexico City) is a professional male squash player who represented Mexico. He reached a career-high world ranking of World No. 46 in December 2008.
