= Sam Howe =

American hardball squash player (1938–2022)

Samuel P. Howe III (1938 – September 15, 2022) was an American hardball squash player. He was one of the leading squash players in the United States in the 1960s.

Howe won the US national singles title in 1962 and 1967. He also won six national doubles titles – three partnering Bill Danforth (1963, 1964 and 1967), and three partnering his younger brother Ralph Howe (1969, 1970 and 1971).

== Honors ==
Howe was inducted into the United States Squash Racquets Association Hall of Fame in 2002. He was also inducted in the Men’s College Squash Hall of Fame in 1994.
