= Luciano Barbosa =

Brazilian squash player (born 1976)

Personal information
- Full name: Luciano Alves Barbosa
- Born: 30 December 1976 (age 49) Rio Grande, Rio Grande do Sul, Brazil

Sport
Medal record
Men's squash
Representing Brazil
Pan American Games
Silver medal – second place	2003 Santo Domingo	Team
Bronze medal – third place	2007 Rio de Janeiro	Team

Luciano Alves Barbosa (born 30 December 1976 in Rio Grande, Rio Grande do Sul) is a professional male squash player who represented Brazil during his career. He reached a career-high world ranking of World No. 120 in February 2004 after having joined the Professional Squash Association in 1999.
