= Michelle Quibell =

American squash player (born 1984)

Personal information
- Born: April 23, 1984 (age 42) Atlanta, Georgia
- Education: University of Michigan

Sport
- Country: United States
- Handedness: Right Handed
- Turned pro: 2004
- Racquet used: Dunlop

Women's singles
- Highest ranking: No. 103 (March, 2005)
Medal record
Women's Squash
Representing the United States
Pan American Games
Silver medal – second place	2007 Rio de Janeiro	Team
- Updated on December 22, 2009

Michelle Quibell (born April 23, 1984) is an American professional squash player. She was a four-year member of Yale's women's squash squad during a period of unprecedented success for the program. She reached a career-high world ranking of World No. 103 in March 2005. Quibell was the two-time NCAA Division 1 Champion.

Quibell graduated in 2006 from Yale University with a degree in Environmental Studies and graduated in 2011 with a dual MBA / Master of Environmental Science degree from the University of Michigan.
