= Graeme Schnell =

Canadian squash player (born 1988)

Personal information
- Born: 7 May 1988 (age 38) Calgary, Alberta, Canada
- Height: 183 cm (6 ft 0 in)
- Weight: 65 kg (143 lb)

Sport
- Country: Canada
- Coached by: Andrew Schnell
- Retired: Active
- Racquet used: Black Knight

Men's singles
- Highest ranking: No. 138 (April 2015)
- Title: 2
Medal record
Representing Canada
Men's squash
Pan American Games
Bronze medal – third place	2023 Santiago	Team
- Updated on May 2019

Graeme Schnell (born 7 May 1988 in Calgary), is a Canadian professional squash player. He won the Mount Royal University Open twice, in 2016 and 2020. He has represented Canada internationally.
