= Jorge Gutiérrez (squash player) =

Argentine squash player

Personal information
- Born: September 6, 1979 (age 46)

Sport
Medal record
Men's squash
Representing Argentina
Pan American Games
Silver medal – second place	1999 Winnipeg	Singles
Bronze medal – third place	1999 Winnipeg	Team
Bronze medal – third place	2003 Santo Domingo	Team

Jorge Gutiérrez (born September 6, 1979) is a professional male squash player who represented Argentina during his career. He reached a career-high world ranking of World No. 152 in March 2005.
