= Lapham-Grant Trophy =

The Lapham-Grant Trophy is an annual singles and doubles squash event contested between the United States and Canada. The location rotates between the U.S. and Canada, and features the top singles and doubles players from each country. It is the oldest international doubles contest in the world.
