= Henri Salaun =

Henri Salaun may refer to:

- Henri Salaun (admiral), French admiral
- Henri Salaun (squash player), French-born American squash player, grandson of the above
