= Alana Miller =

Canadian squash player (born 1980)

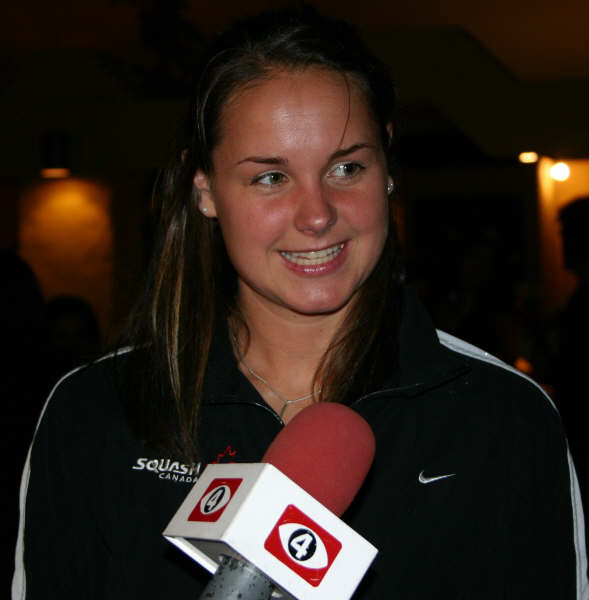
- Alana Miller during Pan American Championships 2005

Personal information
- Full name: Alana Martha Miller
- Nickname: Layni
- Born: July 22, 1980 (age 46) Winnipeg, Manitoba
- Height: 5 ft 10.5 in (1.79 m)

Sport
- Country: Canada
- Handedness: Right Handed
- Turned pro: 2001
- Coached by: Trevor Borland
- Retired: Retired
- Racquet used: Dunlop

Women's singles
- Highest ranking: No. 30 (May, 2009)
- Current ranking: No. 35 (August, 2010)
- Title: 1
Medal record
Women's Squash
Representing Canada
Pan American Games
Gold medal – first place	2007 Rio de Janeiro	Team
Silver medal – second place	2007 Rio de Janeiro	Singles
- Updated on December 23, 2009

Alana Miller (born July 22, 1980) is a Canadian former professional squash player. She reached a career-high world ranking of World No. 30 in May 2009.

Miller was the Canadian National Champion for 2003, 2007 and 2008.

Miller retired after representing Canada at the 2010 Commonwealth Games, where she lost in the Round of 16 to England's Laura Massaro. She retired as the 35th-ranked women's squash player and highest-ranked Canadian woman.

== Career statistics ==
Listed below

=== Professional tour titles (1) ===
All Results for Alana Miller in WISPA World's Tour tournament

Legend WISPA Platinum Series (0) WISPA Gold Series (0) WISPA Silver Series (0) WISPA Tour Series (1)	Titles by Major Tournaments World Open (0) British Open (0) Hong Kong Open (0) Qatar Classic (0)

No.	Date	Tournament	Opponent in Final	Score in Final	Minutes Played
1.	July 9, 2007	Royal Glenora Club Open	(Canada) Runa Reta	9–2, 9–5, 9–5	55 min
