= Jaime Pinto =

Portuguese footballer (born 1997)

Personal information
- Full name: Jaime Alexandrino Gomes Pinto
- Date of birth: 28 September 1997 (age 29)
- Place of birth: Vila do Conde, Portugal
- Height: 1.83 m (6 ft 0 in)
- Position: Winger

Team information
- Current team: União de Leiria
- Number: 21

Youth career
- 2006–2010: Varzim
- 2010–2011: FC Porto
- 2011–2016: Rio Ave

Senior career*
Years	Team	Apps	(Gls)
2016–2021	Rio Ave	3	(0)
2017–2018	→ Merelinense (loan)	22	(4)
2019–2021	Rio Ave B	6	(1)
2020	→ Covilhã (loan)	4	(0)
2021–2024	Oliveirense	70	(12)
2024–2026	Farense	34	(1)
2025	→ Leixões (loan)	7	(2)
2026–	União de Leiria	4	(0)
- * Club domestic league appearances and goals as of 13 September 2026

Jaime Alexandrino Gomes Pinto (born 28 September 1997), known as Jaiminho, is a Portuguese professional footballer who plays as a winger for Liga Portugal 2 club União de Leiria.

== Career ==
On 24 January 2016, Pinto made his professional debut with Rio Ave in a 2015–16 Primeira Liga match against Sporting Braga.
