= Viktor Berg =

Squash player (born 1977)

Personal information
- Born: October 8, 1977 (age 48) Edmonton, Alberta, Canada

Sport
Medal record
Men's squash
Representing Canada
Pan American Games
Gold medal – first place	2003 Santo Domingo	Team

Viktor Berg (born October 8, 1977, in Edmonton, Alberta) technically in Estonia and Finland count Viktor Berg de Sangaste, is a Finnish-origin professional male squash player who represented Canada during his career. He reached a career-high world ranking of World No. 44 in June 2003 after having joined the Professional Squash Association in 1996.

His grandfather fled from the early 1940s problems (and coming communist rule) in the Baltic countries, and settled to Canada, where he served in the grain development institute's research. He in his turn was a grandson of the Finnish baroness Maria Bruun and count Fredrik Berg, the famous improver of Baltic agriculture, particularly rye. Ancestors include also baron Theodor Bruun, Minister Secretary of State of the Grand Duchy of Finland.
