= Rafael Alarçón =

Brazilian squash player (born 1977)

Personal information
- Full name: Rafael F. Alarcon
- Born: February 5, 1977 (age 49) São Paulo, Brazil
- Height: 1.77 m (5 ft 10 in)
- Weight: 75 kg (165 lb)

Sport
- Country: Brazil
- Turned pro: 1998
- Coached by: Sabir Butt
- Retired: Active
- Racquet used: Tecnifibre

Men's singles
- Highest ranking: No. 36 (December, 2006)
- Current ranking: No. 40 (December, 2009)
Medal record
Men's squash
Representing Brazil
Pan American Games
Silver medal – second place	2003 Santo Domingo	Team
Bronze medal – third place	2007 Rio de Janeiro	Team
South American Games
Silver medal – second place	2010 Medellín	Singles
Silver medal – second place	2010 Medellín	Team
Bronze medal – third place	2010 Medellín	Mixed doubles
- Updated on December 23, 2009

Rafael F. Alarçón (born February 5, 1977, in São Paulo) is a professional male squash player who represented Brazil during his career. He reached a career-high world ranking of World No. 36 in December 2006 after having joined the Professional Squash Association in 1998.
