= Julian Illingworth =

American squash player (born 1984)

Personal information
- Born: January 30, 1984 (age 42) Portland, Oregon, U.S.
- Height: 6 ft 1 in (185 cm)
- Weight: 175 lb (79 kg)

Sport
- Country: United States
- Handedness: Right
- Turned pro: 2003
- Coached by: Gareth Webber
- Racquet used: Dunlop

Men's singles
- Highest ranking: No. 24 (January 2012)
- Title: 12
- Tour final: 23
Medal record
Men's squash
Representing the United States
Pan American Games
Silver medal – second place	2011 Guadalajara	Doubles
Silver medal – second place	2007 Rio de Janeiro	Singles
Bronze medal – third place	2011 Guadalajara	Team
- Updated on June 2022

Julian Illingworth (born January 30, 1984) is a retired American professional squash player.

== Biography ==
Illingworth first made an impression on the American junior circuit in 1998-1999 when he finished third in the country for boys under 16. Illingworth attended Yale University when his age was 18. He was a 4 time All-American selection and 4 time All-Ivy selection on the squash team. He also won 2 national individual titles during his junior and senior years at Yale.

After Illingworth graduated from college in 2006, he played professionally for 8 years. He became the highest-ranked American male player of all-time after reaching no. 24 in the world. He is a record 9-time U.S. national champion, with 8 successive titles from 2005 to 2012. He was the inaugural US Pro Squash Series champion for the 2012–13 season. Illingworth retired from playing full-time on the PSA World Tour in 2014 and made his last appearance on the tour in March 2017.
