= Meredeth Quick =

American squash player (born 1979)

Personal information
- Born: November 5, 1979 (age 46) Denver, Colorado, U.S.

Sport
Medal record
Women's squash
Representing the United States
Pan American Games
Gold medal – first place	2003 Santo Domingo	Team

Meredeth Quick (born May 11, 1979) is an American professional squash player. She reached a career-high ranking of World No. 37 in December 2003 after having joined the Women's International Squash Players Association (WISPA) in 2002.

Her brother, Preston Quick, is also a squash player.
