= Latasha Khan =

American squash player (born 1973)

Personal information
- Born: January 20, 1973 (age 53) Seattle, Washington, U.S.

Sport
- Country: United States
- Handedness: Right Handed
- Turned pro: 1992
- Coached by: Yusuf Khan
- Retired: 2015
- Racquet used: Prince

Women's singles
- Highest ranking: No. 18 (January 2000)
- Title: 9
- Tour final: 22
Medal record
Women's squash
Representing the United States
Pan American Games
Gold medal – first place	2003 Santo Domingo	Singles
Gold medal – first place	2003 Santo Domingo	Team
Silver medal – second place	1999 Winnipeg	Team
Silver medal – second place	2007 Rio de Janeiro	Team
Bronze medal – third place	1999 Winnipeg	Singles
- Updated on November 2017

Latasha Khan (born January 20, 1973, in Seattle) is an American professional female squash player. She reached a career-high world ranking of World No. 18 in January 2000. She started to play at the age of 9. She earned a team and individual gold medal at the 2003 Pan Am Games in Santo Domingo, Dominican Republic. With 3,410 points on the international points table in September 2009, she was ranked No. 28 in the international circuit. She is a right handed player. After spending some time as a junior player, Khan started to play professional squash back in 1992. Khan practices and plays at Seattle Athletic Club Downtown under the coaching of Yusuf Khan and uses Prince brand of racquets. In 2009, she earned points by appearing in Sun & Surf 2009, Squash Pyramides 2009, Seoul Squash Open 2009, Fassp St Luke's Open 2009, Subway Goshen Open 2009, Cayman Islands Open 2009, Racquet Club International 2009, Atwater Cup 2009, Burning River Classic 2009 and Liberty Bell Open 2009. Her hobbies and interests includes shopping and music. Her sister Shabana Khan is also a former professional squash player, and their father is a cousin of squash legend Jahangir Khan.
