= Marnie Baizley =

Canadian squash player (born 1975)

Personal information
- Born: July 24, 1975 (age 51) Winnipeg, Manitoba, Canada

Sport
Medal record
Women's squash
Representing Canada
Pan American Games
Gold medal – first place	1999 Winnipeg	Team
Silver medal – second place	2003 Santo Domingo	Team
Bronze medal – third place	1999 Winnipeg	Singles
Bronze medal – third place	2003 Santo Domingo	Singles

Marnie Baizley (born July 24, 1975, in Winnipeg, Manitoba) is a Canadian professional squash player. She reached a career-high world ranking of World No. 30 in July 1999 after having joined the Women's International Squash Players Association in 1997.
