= Squash at the 1999 Pan American Games =

- Venues: Winnipeg, Manitoba, Canada
- Dates: July 23 - August 8

Squash competitions at the 1999 Pan American Games was held from July 23 to August 8 in Winnipeg, Manitoba, Canada.

== Men's competition ==
=== Singles ===
Quarterfinals
Usandizaga (ARG) | 9 | 10 | 9
Elias (PER) | 4 | 8 | 4
Gutiérrez (ARG) | 9 | 9 | 10
Casarino (PAR) | 4 | 7 | 9
Conceição (BRA) | 10 | 9 | 9
Mendez (MEX) | 9 | 4 | 0
Ryding (CAN) | 9 | 9 | 9
Oliveira (BRA) | 1 | 3 | 2

Semifinals
Usandizaga (ARG) | 8 | 1 | 5
Gutiérrez (ARG) | 10 | 9 | 9
Conceição (BRA) | 6 | 1 | 1
Ryding (CAN) | 9 | 9 | 9

Final
Gutiérrez (ARG) | 3 | 3 | 3
Ryding (CAN) | 9 | 9 | 9

| RANK | FINAL RANKING |
|---|---|
| Gold medal | Graham Ryding (CAN) |
| Silver medal | Jorge Gutiérrez (ARG) |
| Bronze medal | Ronivaldo Conceição (BRA) |
| Bronze medal | Federico Usandizaga (ARG) |

=== Team ===
| RANK | FINAL RANKING |
|---|---|
| Gold medal | Canada |
| Silver medal | Brazil |
| Bronze medal | Argentina |
| Bronze medal | Colombia |

== Women's competition ==
=== Singles ===
Quarterfinals
Khan (USA) | 7 | 9 | 9 | 9
Castro (COL) | 9 | 1 | 0 | 4
Holleran (USA) | 9 | 9 | 9
Osorio (MEX) | 0 | 0 | 0
Baizley (CAN) | 9 | 9 | 9
Moura (BRA) | 2 | 4 | 2
Jans (CAN) | 9 | 9 | 9
Redfern (BRA) | 1 | 6 | 1

Semifinals
Khan (USA) | 8 | 2 | 9 | 9 | 0
Holleran (USA) | 10 | 9 | 5 | 0 | 9
Baizley (CAN) | 2 | 9 | 5 | 9 | 5
Jans (CAN) | 9 | 5 | 9 | 4 | 9

Final
Holleran (USA) | 5 | 8 | 1
Jans (CAN) | 9 | 10 | 9

| RANK | FINAL RANKING |
|---|---|
| Gold medal | Melanie Jans (CAN) |
| Silver medal | Demer Holleran (USA) |
| Bronze medal | Marnie Baizley (CAN) |
| Bronze medal | Latasha Khan (USA) |

=== Team ===
| RANK | FINAL RANKING |
|---|---|
| Gold medal | Canada |
| Silver medal | United States |
| Bronze medal | Brazil |
| Bronze medal | Mexico |

== Medal table ==
| Place | Nation | Gold medal | Silver medal | Bronze medal | Total |
|---|---|---|---|---|---|
| 1 | Canada | 4 | 0 | 1 | 5 |
| 2 | United States | 0 | 2 | 1 | 3 |
| 3 | Argentina | 0 | 1 | 2 | 3 |
| | Brazil | 0 | 1 | 2 | 3 |
| 5 | Colombia | 0 | 0 | 1 | 1 |
| | Mexico | 0 | 0 | 1 | 1 |
| Total | | 4 | 4 | 8 | 16 |
