= Preston Quick =

American squash player (born 1978)

Personal information
- Born: March 10, 1978 (age 48) Colorado, U.S.

Sport
- Turned pro: 2000
- Highest ranking: No. 97 (01 January 2003)
Medal record
Men's squash
Representing the United States
Pan American Games
| Bronze medal – third place | 2003 Santo Domingo | Singles |

Preston Quick (born March 10, 1978) is a professional male squash player who represented the United States during his career. He reached a career-high ranking of World No. 97 in January 2003 after having joined the Professional Squash Association in 2000.

His sister, Meredeth Quick, is also a squash player.
