= Graham Ryding =

Canadian squash player (born 1975)

Personal information
- Born: June 16, 1975 (age 51) Winnipeg, Manitoba, Canada

Sport
- Country: Canada

Men's singles
- World Open: SF (2004)
Medal record
Men's squash
Representing Canada
World Games
Bronze medal – third place	1997 Lahti	Singles
World Championships
Bronze medal – third place	2004 Doha	Singles
Pan American Games
Gold medal – first place	1999 Winnipeg	Singles
Gold medal – first place	1999 Winnipeg	Team
Gold medal – first place	2003 Santo Domingo	Team
Silver medal – second place	2003 Santo Domingo	Singles

Graham Ryding (born June 16, 1975 in Winnipeg, Manitoba) is a professional male squash player who represented Canada during his career. He reached a career-high world ranking of World No. 10 in November 1999 after having joined the Professional Squash Association in 1993. Ryding was a semi-finalist in the 2004 World Open, a member of the 1997 World Team Championships where Canada placed second and a three-time Canadian National Champion.

Through his playing career, Ryding earned his Bachelor of Commerce from the University of Toronto and, following his retirement in 2007, earned his Chartered Financial Analyst designation in 2009.
