= Eric Gálvez =

Mexican squash player (born 1983)

Personal information
- Full name: Eric Moisés Gálvez Sánchez
- Born: 4 October 1983 (age 43) Puebla, Mexico
- Height: 1.68 m (5 ft 6 in)
- Weight: 68 kg (150 lb)

Sport
- Country: Mexico
- Turned pro: 2000
- Coached by: Reman Gul
- Retired: Active
- Racquet used: Dunlop

Men's singles
- Highest ranking: No. 33 (February 2007)
- Current ranking: No. 79 (July 2014)
Medal record
Men's squash
Representing Mexico
Pan American Games
| Gold medal – first place | 2011 Guadalajara | Doubles |
| Gold medal – first place | 2011 Guadalajara | Team |
| Gold medal – first place | 2007 Rio de Janeiro | Singles |
| Bronze medal – third place | 2007 Rio de Janeiro | Team |
- Updated on July 2014

Eric Moisés Gálvez Sánchez (born 4 October 1983, in Puebla), known as Eric Gálvez, is a professional squash player who represented Mexico. He reached a career-high PSA ranking of World No. 33 in February 2007.

Towards the end of 2014, in the final of the Xalapa Squash Open, Gálvez became the first Mexican to win 10 PSA World Tour titles after beating Argentina's Gonzalo Miranda at Squash Insurgentes in Xalapa in the Mexican state of Veracruz.
