= Sabir Butt =

Canadian squash player (born 1969)

Personal information
- Born: April 20, 1969 (age 57) Nairobi, Kenya

Sport
Medal record
Men's squash
Representing Canada
Pan American Games
Bronze medal – third place	1995 Mar del Plata	Singles
Gold medal – first place	1995 Mar del Plata	Teams

Sabir Butt (born April 20, 1969 in Nairobi, Kenya) is a Canadian former professional male squash player. He reached a career-high world ranking of World No.17 in May 1988 after having joined the Professional Squash Association in 1985. Winner of 16 PSA international events and 4 time Canadian National Men's Champion. He represented Canada during the 1987 & 1989 World Team Squash Championships. Sabir was also Mississauga Athlete of the Year in 1994.
