= Melanie Jans =

Canadian squash player (born 1973)

Personal information
- Born: July 3, 1973 (age 52) Montreal, Quebec, Canada

Sport
Medal record
Women's squash
Representing Canada
Pan American Games
Gold medal – first place	1999 Winnipeg	Singles
Gold medal – first place	1999 Winnipeg	Team
Silver medal – second place	2003 Santo Domingo	Singles
Silver medal – second place	2003 Santo Domingo	Team

Melanie Jans (born July 3, 1973) is a Canadian former professional squash player who represented Canada. She reached a career-high world ranking of World No. 25 in March 1999 after having joined the Women's International Squash Players Association in 1991.

After retiring from professional sport, JANS joined Club Meadowvale in Mississauga as the Club Pro. Since January 2018 Melanie has been the Oakville Club squash professional.

In 2015 JANS was inducted in to the Ontario Squash Hall of Fame, and subsequently inducted in the Canadian Squash Hall of Fame in 2022.
