= Rodrigo Pezzota =

Argentinian squash player

Personal information
- Born: October 31, 1984 (age 41) Rosario, Argentina
- Height: 1.81 m (5 ft 11 in)
- Weight: 77 kg (170 lb)

Sport
- Country: Argentina
- Turned pro: 2005
- Coached by: Alejandro Ventura
- Retired: Active
- Racquet used: Head

Men's singles
- Highest ranking: No. 140 (December, 2014)
- Current ranking: No. 159 (January 2015)
Medal record
Men's squash
Representing Argentina
Pan American Games
Bronze medal – third place	2003 Santo Domingo	Team
- Updated on January 2015

Rodrigo Pezzota (born October 31, 1984, in Rosario), is an Argentinian professional squash player. He reached a career-high world ranking of World No. 140 in December 2014. Rodrigo won the bronze medal at the 2015 Pan American Games.
