= Victor Elmaleh =

American businessman and handball player

- Born: November 27, 1918; Mogador, now Essaouira, Morocco
- Died: November 17, 2014 (aged 95); Lenox Hill Hospital; Manhattan, New York City, U.S.
- Education: Brooklyn College; University of Virginia
- Occupation: Businessman
- Known for: Real estate developer, painter, national handball and squash champion
- Spouse: Sono Osato (m. 1943)
- Children: 2

Victor Elmaleh (pronounced el-MAHL-ay; November 27, 1918 – November 17, 2014) was a Moroccan-born American businessman and real estate developer. He was born in Mogador, now Essaouira, Morocco, the eldest of six siblings. He was among the first to import Volkswagens to the United States.

== Biography ==
Elmaleh was born to a Jewish family in Mogador, now Essaouira, Morocco. He was the eldest of six brothers. His surname was an Arabic-Moroccan name that his Sephardic Jewish forebears had adopted after fleeing the Spanish Inquisition to Morocco.

He came to the United States in 1925, and grew up in Bensonhurst and Borough Park in Brooklyn. He attended P.S. 48, and later majored in music at Brooklyn College. He then attended the University of Virginia, where he studied architecture.

He won the one-wall handball national doubles championship in 1951. At 49, he and Victor Niederhoffer won the U.S. national doubles squash championship. He continued to play squash and win tournaments at an advanced age. He enjoyed watercolor painting, creating 4,000 in his lifetime, some of which were exhibited in galleries.

In 1957 he co-founded the first and largest VW independent distributorship, World-Wide Volkswagen Corp, in the US. It was sold in 1994, by which time it serviced 133 Audi and VW dealers in the New York Tri-state region, and accounted for 17% of US VW sales and 20% of Audi sales.

Starting as an architect, in 1975 he formed World-Wide Holdings to invest in real estate. He developed $7 billion worth of real estate, aiming for areas other stayed away from.

In 1943, he married ballerina Sono Osato, with whom he was married for 70 years and had two sons. Osato was a member of the American Ballet and performed on Broadway and Hollywood movies.

He died on November 17, 2014, at Lenox Hill Hospital in Manhattan, New York City.
