= Carolyn Russell =

Canadian squash player (born 1974)

Personal information
- Born: May 18, 1974 (age 52) Montreal, Quebec, Canada

Sport
Medal record
Women's Squash
Representing Canada
Pan American Games
Gold medal – first place	2007 Rio de Janeiro	Team
Silver medal – second place	2003 Santo Domingo	Team

Carolyn Russell (born May 18, 1974 in Montreal, Quebec) is a Canadian retired professional squash player. She reached a career-high world ranking of World No. 40 in March 2007 after having joined the Women's International Squash Players Association (WISPA) in 2001.

Russell won the Canadian Championships in 2006, was 3rd in 2007, and 4th in 2005 and 2009.

Russell represented Canada five times at the world team championships helping Canada to four top 10 finishes.

== Personal ==
Russell currently resides in Vancouver, B.C. and is a project director at the Multi Sport Centre of Excellence Foundation in Burnaby, B.C. She holds a M.S. in engineering from Queen's University and an MBA degree from the University of Toronto.
