= Squash at the 1995 Pan American Games =

- Venue: Mar del Plata
- Dates: March 11 - March 26

Squash competitions at the 1995 Pan American Games was held from March 11 to March 26 in Mar del Plata, Argentina. This marked the first squash competition at the Pan American Games.

== Men's competition ==
=== Singles ===
RANK	FINAL RANKING
Gold medal	Gary Waite (CAN)
Silver medal	Jonathon Power (CAN)
Bronze medal	Mark Talbott (USA)
Bronze medal	Federico Usandizaga (ARG)

=== Team ===
RANK	FINAL RANKING
Gold medal	Canada
Silver medal	Argentina
Bronze medal	Brazil
Bronze medal	United States

== Women's competition ==
=== Singles ===
RANK	FINAL RANKING
Gold medal	Heather Wallace (CAN)
Silver medal	Deming Holleran (USA)
Bronze medal	Ellie Pierce (USA)
Bronze medal	Flavia Roberts (BRA)

=== Team ===
RANK	FINAL RANKING
Gold medal	Canada
Silver medal	United States
Bronze medal	Colombia
Bronze medal	Brazil

== Overall ==
RANK	FINAL RANKING
Gold medal	Canada
Silver medal	United States
Bronze medal	Brazil

== Medal table ==
Place	Nation	Gold medal	Silver medal	Bronze medal	Total
1	Canada	4	1	0	5
2	United States	0	2	2	4
3	Argentina	0	1	1	2
4	Brazil	0	0	2	2
	Colombia	0	0	1	1
Total		4	4	6	14
