= 2022 PSA Women's World Squash Championship =

2022 Women's World Championship
- 37th PSA Women's World Squash Championship
- Location: Cairo, Egypt
- Venue: Club S Allegria; National Museum of Egyptian Civilization
- Date: 13–22 May 2022
- Website https://worldsquashchamps.com/
- Category: PSA World Championships
- Prize money: $550,000

Results
- Champion: (Egypt) Nour El Sherbini
- Runner-up: (Egypt) Nouran Gohar
- Semi-finalists: (United States) Amanda Sobhy (Egypt) Nour El Tayeb

The 2022 PSA Women's World Squash Championship is the 2022 women's edition of the World Squash Championships, which served as the individual world championship for squash players. The event takes place in Cairo, Egypt from 13 to 22 May 2022. It will be the third time that Cairo host the PSA World Championships after 2014 and 2019–20 editions.

== World Ranking Points/Prize money ==
PSA also awards points towards World Ranking. Points are awarded as follows:

PSA World Squash Championships		Ranking Points						
Rank	Prize money US$	Winner	Runner up	3/4	5/8	9/16	17/32	33/64
World Squash Championships	$550,000	3175	2090	1270	780	475	290	177.5

=== Prize money breakdown ===
Total prize money for the tournament is $1,100,000, $550,000 per gender. This is about a 9% prize fund increase from previous World Championships (2020–21; 500,000$ per gender).

Position (num. of players)		% breakdown	Prize money (Total: $550,000)
Winner	(1)	16%	$88,000
Runner-up	(1)	10%	$55,000
3/4	(2)	6%	$33,000
5/8	(4)	3.50%	$19,250
9/16	(8)	2.10%	$11,550
17/32	(16)	1.20%	$6,600
33/64	(32)	0.75%	$4,125

== Seeds ==
Click on the seed number of a player to go to their draw section.

1. (Egypt) Nouran Gohar (finals)
2. (Egypt) Nour El Sherbini (champion)
3. (Egypt) Hania El Hammamy (quarter finals)
4. (United States) Amanda Sobhy (semi finals)
5. (New Zealand) Joelle King (third round)
6. (England) Sarah-Jane Perry (quarter finals)
7. (Egypt) Salma Hany (second round)
8. (Egypt) Rowan Elaraby (quarter finals)

9. (England) Georgina Kennedy (third round)
10. (United States) Olivia Fiechter (second round)
11. (Belgium) Nele Gilis (third round)
12. (India) Joshna Chinappa (third round)
13. (Wales) Tesni Evans (third round)
14. (Egypt) Nadine Shahin (second round)
15. (Egypt) Nada Abbas (quarter finals)
16. (Canada) Hollie Naughton (second round)

== Draw and results ==
=== Key ===
- rtd. = Retired
- Q = Qualifier
- WC = Host wild card
- I = WSF invitee
- w/o = Walkover

=== Finals ===
Semi finals
1	(Egypt) Nouran Gohar	5	11	11	15
4	(United States) Amanda Sobhy	11	3	6	13
(Egypt) Nour El Tayeb	6	8	11	3
2	(Egypt) Nour El Sherbini	11	11	9	11

Final
1	(Egypt) Nouran Gohar	11	7	8	7
2	(Egypt) Nour El Sherbini	7	11	11	11

2022 Women's PSA World Squash Championship winner
(Egypt)
Nour El Sherbini
Sixth title

=== Top half ===
==== Section 1 ====
First round
1	(Egypt) Nouran Gohar	11	11	11
(France) Énora Villard	7	6	2
(Egypt) Nour Aboulmakarim	12	8	12	5
(Egypt) Farida Mohamed	10	11	14	11
(Malaysia) Rachel Arnold	11	11	8	11	3
(France) Coline Aumard	5	6	11	13	11
I	(Poland) Karina Tyma	11	5	5	4
13	(Wales) Tesni Evans	7	11	11	11
12	(India) Joshna Chinappa	11	11	11
Q	(England) Katie Malliff	6	8	9
(Switzerland) Cindy Merlo	11	1	4	4
(Wales) Emily Whitlock	4	11	11	11
(Egypt) Hana Ramadan	11	11	11
(France) Marie Stephan	8	7	9
(England) Millie Tomlinson	5	5	9
8	(Egypt) Rowan Elaraby	11	11	11

Second round
1	(Egypt) Nouran Gohar	11	11	11
(Egypt) Farida Mohamed	4	2	4
(France) Coline Aumard	10	2
13	(Wales) Tesni Evans	12	11	rtd.
12	(India) Joshna Chinappa	11	12	11
(Wales) Emily Whitlock	8	10	5
(Egypt) Hana Ramadan	7	7	9
8	(Egypt) Rowan Elaraby	11	11	11

Third Round
1	(Egypt) Nouran Gohar	11	11	11
13	(Wales) Tesni Evans	6	4	4
12	(India) Joshna Chinappa
8	(Egypt) Rowan Elaraby	w/o

Quarter finals
1	(Egypt) Nouran Gohar	11	11	11
8	(Egypt) Rowan Elaraby	1	5	4

==== Section 2 ====
First round
5	(New Zealand) Joelle King	11	11	11
(Hong Kong) Tong Tsz Wing	7	5	8
(Egypt) Yathreb Adel	9	12	14	4	11
(Egypt) Mariam Metwally	11	10	12	11	5
(United States) Olivia Clyne	6	11	11	11
(England) Julianne Courtice	11	8	8	9
(Hong Kong) Ho Tze-Lok	6	5	11
15	(Egypt) Nada Abbas	11	11	13
11	(Belgium) Nele Gilis	9	11	11	11
(Finland) Emilia Soini	11	2	3	4
(Scotland) Lisa Aitken	11	11	11
(Australia) Donna Lobban	9	1	4
Q	(South Africa) Alexandra Fuller	7	11	11	10	11
I	(Spain) Marta Domínguez	11	3	4	12	2
(United States) Haley Mendez	4	4	1
4	(United States) Amanda Sobhy	11	11	11

Second round
5	(New Zealand) Joelle King	11	11	11
(Egypt) Yathreb Adel	3	5	9
(United States) Olivia Clyne	6	0^{rtd.}
15	(Egypt) Nada Abbas	11	3
11	(Belgium) Nele Gilis	11	11	11
(Scotland) Lisa Aitken	6	5	6
Q	(South Africa) Alexandra Fuller	3	5	6
4	(United States) Amanda Sobhy	11	11	11

Third Round
5	(New Zealand) Joelle King	7	13	11	6
15	(Egypt) Nada Abbas	11	15	8	11
11	(Belgium) Nele Gilis	9	8	9
4	(United States) Amanda Sobhy	11	11	11

Quarter finals
15	(Egypt) Nada Abbas	12	6	5	5
4	(United States) Amanda Sobhy	10	11	11	11

=== Bottom half ===
==== Section 3 ====
First round
3	(Egypt) Hania El Hammamy	11	11	11
(Egypt) Sana Ibrahim	7	7	4
Q	(Japan) Satomi Watanabe	12	13	11	14
(England) Lucy Turmel	14	11	6	12
(Canada) Danielle Letourneau	11	11	11
(Czech Republic) Anna Serme	6	4	3
(Netherlands) Milou van der Heijden	2	0	4
9	(England) Georgina Kennedy	11	11	11
14	(Egypt) Nadine Shahin	7	11	11	11
(Canada) Nicole Bunyan	11	9	6	8
I	(Germany) Saskia Beinhard	3	3	2
(Malaysia) Sivasangari Subramaniam	11	11	11
(Malaysia) Aifa Azman	7	3	6
(Egypt) Nour El Tayeb	11	11	11
(Latvia) Ineta Mackeviča	6	11	3
7	(Egypt) Salma Hany	11	13	11

Second round
3	(Egypt) Hania El Hammamy	8	11	11	11
Q	(Japan) Satomi Watanabe	11	5	9	2
(Canada) Danielle Letourneau	2	4	2
9	(England) Georgina Kennedy	11	11	11
14	(Egypt) Nadine Shahin	9	9	9
(Malaysia) Sivasangari Subramaniam	11	11	11
(Egypt) Nour El Tayeb	12	9	11	11
7	(Egypt) Salma Hany	10	11	3	3

Third Round
3	(Egypt) Hania El Hammamy	11	11	11
9	(England) Georgina Kennedy	9	6	8
(Malaysia) Sivasangari Subramaniam	5	11	5	11
(Egypt) Nour El Tayeb	11	4	11	13

Quarter finals
3	(Egypt) Hania El Hammamy	8	4	12	8
(Egypt) Nour El Tayeb	11	11	10	11

==== Section 4 ====
First round
6	(England) Sarah-Jane Perry	11	11	6	11
(Hong Kong) Chan Sin Yuk	4	8	11	4
(Egypt) Zeina Mickawy	13	6	11	8	7
(France) Mélissa Alves	11	11	3	11	11
(United States) Sabrina Sobhy	11	11	11
(Egypt) Jana Shiha	3	5	8
(Hong Kong) Lee Ka Yi	8	10	13	6
10	(United States) Olivia Fiechter	11	12	11	11
16	(Canada) Hollie Naughton	7	11	11	11
WC	(Egypt) Nardine Garas	11	9	3	1
I	(Scotland) Georgia Adderley	2	11	4	10
(Belgium) Tinne Gilis	11	5	11	12
(England) Jasmine Hutton	10	10	10
Q	(Egypt) Kenzy Ayman	12	12	12
(Spain) Cristina Gómez	4	5	4
2	(Egypt) Nour El Sherbini	11	11	11

Second round
6	(England) Sarah-Jane Perry	11	11	12
(France) Mélissa Alves	8	4	10
(United States) Sabrina Sobhy	12	11	11
10	(United States) Olivia Fiechter	10	5	9
16	(Canada) Hollie Naughton	7	8	2
(Belgium) Tinne Gilis	11	11	11
Q	(Egypt) Kenzy Ayman	14	7	4	9
2	(Egypt) Nour El Sherbini	12	11	11	11

Third Round
6	(England) Sarah-Jane Perry	8	11	11	2	11
(United States) Sabrina Sobhy	11	7	8	11	8
(Belgium) Tinne Gilis	5	4	5
2	(Egypt) Nour El Sherbini	11	11	11

Quarter finals
6	(England) Sarah-Jane Perry	5	11	7	12
2	(Egypt) Nour El Sherbini	11	8	11	14

== Schedule ==
Times are Egypt Standard Time (UTC+02:00). To the best of five games.

=== Round 1 ===
Friday, 13 May

Date	Court	Time	Player 1	Player 2	Score
13 May	Court 1	12:00	Joelle King (NZL)	Tong Tsz Wing (HKG)	11–7, 11–5, 11–8
13 May	Court 2	12:00	Ho Tze-Lok (HKG)	Nada Abbas (EGY)	11–6, 11–5, 13–11
13 May	Court 3	12:00	Nele Gilis (BEL)	Emilia Soini (FIN)	9–11, 11–2, 11–3, 11–4
13 May	Court 1	13:30	Yathreb Adel (EGY)	Mariam Metwally (EGY)	9–11, 12–10, 14–12, 4–11, 11–5
13 May	Court 2	13:30	Olivia Clyne (USA)	Julianne Courtice (ENG)	6–11, 11–8, 11–8, 11–9
13 May	Court 3	13:30	Lisa Aitken (SCO)	Donna Lobban (AUS)	11–9, 11–1, 11–4
13 May	Court 1	15:00	Millie Tomlinson (ENG)	Rowan Elaraby (EGY)	11–5, 11–5, 11–9
13 May	Court 2	15:00	Joshna Chinappa (IND)	Katie Malliff (ENG)	11–6, 11–8, 11–9
13 May	Court 3	15:00	Karina Tyma (POL)	Tesni Evans (WAL)	7–11, 11–5, 11–5, 11–4
13 May	Court 1	16:45	Hana Ramadan (EGY)	Marie Stephan (FRA)	11–8, 11–7, 11–9
13 May	Court 2	17:30	Cindy Merlo (SUI)	Emily Whitlock (WAL)	4–11, 11–1, 11–4, 11–4
13 May	Court 3	17:30	Rachel Arnold (MYS)	Coline Aumard (FRA)	5–11, 6–11, 11–8, 13–11, 11–3
13 May	Court 1	18:15	Nour Aboulmakarim (EGY)	Farida Mohamed (EGY)	10–12, 11–8, 14–12, 11–5
13 May	Glass Court	18:45	Nouran Gohar (EGY)	Énora Villard (FRA)	11–7, 11–6, 11–2
13 May	Court 3	19:00	Alexandra Fuller (RSA)	Marta Domínguez (ESP)	7–11, 11–3, 11–4, 10–12, 11–2
13 May	Glass Court	20:15	Haley Mendez (USA)	Amanda Sobhy (USA)	11–4, 11–4, 11–1

——————————————————————————————————————————————————————————————————————————————————————————————————————————

Saturday, 14 May

Date	Court	Time	Player 1	Player 2	Score
14 May	Court 1	12:00	Ineta Mackeviča (LAT)	Salma Hany (EGY)	11–6, 13–11, 11–3
14 May	Court 2	12:00	Nadine Shahin (EGY)	Nicole Bunyan (CAN)	7–11, 11–9, 11–6, 11–8
14 May	Court 3	12:00	Milou van der Heijden (NED)	Georgina Kennedy (ENG)	11–2, 11–0, 11–4
14 May	Court 1	13:30	Aifa Azman (MYS)	Nour El Tayeb (EGY)	11–7, 11–3, 11–6
14 May	Court 2	13:30	Saskia Beinhard (GER)	Sivasangari Subramaniam (MYS)	11–3, 11–3, 11–2
14 May	Court 3	13:30	Danielle Letourneau (CAN)	Anna Serme (CZE)	11–6, 11–4, 11–3
14 May	Court 1	15:00	Sarah-Jane Perry (ENG)	Chan Sin Yuk (HKG)	11–4, 11–8, 6–11, 11–4
14 May	Court 2	15:00	Lee Ka Yi (HKG)	Olivia Fiechter (USA)	11–8, 12–10, 11–13, 11–6
14 May	Court 3	15:00	Hollie Naughton (CAN)	Nardine Garas (EGY)	7–11, 11–9, 11–3, 11–1
14 May	Court 1	16:45	Zeina Mickawy (EGY)	Mélissa Alves (FRA)	11–13, 11–6, 3–11, 11–8, 11–7
14 May	Court 2	17:30	Sabrina Sobhy (USA)	Jana Shiha (EGY)	11–3, 11–5, 11–8
14 May	Court 3	17:30	Georgia Adderley (SCO)	Tinne Gilis (BEL)	11–2, 5–11, 11–4, 12–10
14 May	Court 1	18:15	Jasmine Hutton (ENG)	Kenzy Ayman (EGY)	12–10, 12–10, 12–10
14 May	Glass Court	18:45	Cristina Gómez (ESP)	Nour El Sherbini (EGY)	11–4, 11–5, 11–4
14 May	Court 3	19:00	Satomi Watanabe (JPN)	Lucy Turmel (ENG)	12–14, 13–11, 11–6, 14–12
14 May	Glass Court	20:15	Hania El Hammamy (EGY)	Sana Ibrahim (EGY)	11–7, 11–7, 11–4

=== Round 2 ===
Sunday, 15 & Monday 16 May

Date	Court	Time	Player 1	Player 2	Score
15 May	Court 1	14:00	Joelle King (NZL)	Yathreb Adel (EGY)	11–3, 11–5, 11–9
15 May	Court 2	14:00	Olivia Clyne (USA)	Nada Abbas (EGY)	11–6, 3–0^{rtd.}
15 May	Court 3	14:00	Nele Gilis (BEL)	Lisa Aitken (SCO)	11–6, 11–5, 11–6
15 May	Court 1	16:00	Hana Ramadan (EGY)	Rowan Elaraby (EGY)	11–7, 11–7, 11–9
15 May	Court 2	16:00	Joshna Chinappa (IND)	Emily Whitlock (WAL)	11–8, 12–10, 11–5
15 May	Court 3	16:00	Coline Aumard (FRA)	Tesni Evans (WAL)	12–10, 11–2, rtd.
15 May	Glass Court	18:45	Nouran Gohar (EGY)	Farida Mohamed (EGY)	11–4, 11–2, 11–4
15 May	Glass Court	20:15	Alexandra Fuller (RSA)	Amanda Sobhy (USA)	11–3, 11–5, 11–6
16 May	Court 1	14:00	Nour El Tayeb (EGY)	Salma Hany (EGY)	12–10, 9–11, 11–3, 11–3
16 May	Court 2	14:00	Nadine Shahin (EGY)	Sivasangari Subramaniam (MYS)	11–9, 11–9, 11–9
16 May	Court 3	14:00	Danielle Letourneau (CAN)	Georgina Kennedy (ENG)	11–2, 11–4, 11–2
16 May	Court 1	16:00	Sarah-Jane Perry (ENG)	Mélissa Alves (FRA)	11–8, 11–4, 12–10
16 May	Court 2	16:00	Sabrina Sobhy (USA)	Olivia Fiechter (USA)	12–10, 11–5, 11–9
16 May	Court 3	16:00	Hollie Naughton (CAN)	Tinne Gilis (BEL)	11–7, 11–8, 11–2
16 May	Glass Court	18:45	Kenzy Ayman (EGY)	Nour El Sherbini (EGY)	12–14, 11–7, 11–4, 11–9
16 May	Glass Court	20:15	Hania El Hammamy (EGY)	Satomi Watanabe (JPN)	8–11, 11–5, 11–9, 11–2

=== Round 3 ===
Tuesday, 17 & Wednesday 18 May

Date	Court	Time	Player 1	Player 2	Score
17 May	Court Museum	18:45	Nouran Gohar (EGY)	Tesni Evans (WAL)	11–6, 11–4, 11–4
17 May	Glass Court	18:45	Joelle King (NZL)	Nada Abbas (EGY)	11–7, 15–13, 8–11, 11–6
17 May	Court Museum	20:15	Nele Gilis (BEL)	Amanda Sobhy (USA)	11–9, 11–8, 11–9
17 May	Glass Court	20:15	Joshna Chinappa (IND)	Rowan Elaraby (EGY)	w/o
18 May	Court Museum	18:45	Hania El Hammamy (EGY)	Georgina Kennedy (ENG)	11–9, 11–6, 11–8
18 May	Glass Court	18:45	Sivasangari Subramaniam (MYS)	Nour El Tayeb (EGY)	11–5, 4–11, 11–5, 13–11
18 May	Court Museum	20:15	Tinne Gilis (BEL)	Nour El Sherbini (EGY)	11–5, 11–4, 11–5
18 May	Glass Court	20:15	Sarah-Jane Perry (ENG)	Sabrina Sobhy (USA)	8–11, 11–7, 11–8, 2–11, 11–8

=== Quarter-finals ===
Thursday, 19 & Friday 20 May

Date	Court	Time	Player 1	Player 2	Score
19 May	Court Museum	18:45	Nouran Gohar (EGY)	Rowan Elaraby (EGY)	11–1, 11–5, 11–4
19 May	Court Museum	20:15	Nada Abbas (EGY)	Amanda Sobhy (USA)	10–12, 11–6, 11–5, 11–5
20 May	Court Museum	18:45	Sarah-Jane Perry (ENG)	Nour El Sherbini (EGY)	11–5, 8–11, 11–7, 14–12
20 May	Court Museum	20:15	Hania El Hammamy (EGY)	Nour El Tayeb (EGY)	11–8, 11–4, 10–12, 11–8

=== Semi-finals ===
Saturday, 21 May

Date	Court	Time	Player 1	Player 2	Score
21 May	Court Museum	18:30	Nouran Gohar (EGY)	Amanda Sobhy (USA)	5–11, 11–3, 11–6, 15–13
21 May	Court Museum	20:15	Nour El Sherbini (EGY)	Nour El Tayeb (EGY)	11–6, 11–8, 9–11, 11–3

=== Final ===
Sunday, 22 May

Date	Court	Time	Player 1	Player 2	Score
22 May	Court Museum	19:30	Nour El Sherbini (EGY)	Nouran Gohar (EGY)	7–11, 11–7, 11–8, 11–7

== Representation ==
This table shows the number of players by country in the 2022 PSA Women's World Championship. A total of 19 nationalities are represented. Egypt is the most represented nation with 18 players.

	(Egypt) EGY	(United States) USA	(England) ENG	(Belgium) BEL	(Malaysia) MAS	(Wales) WAL	(India) IND	(New Zealand) NZL	(France) FRA	(Canada) CAN	(Scotland) SCO	(Japan) JPN	(South Africa) RSA	(Hong Kong) HKG	(Spain) ESP	(Australia) AUS	(Czech Republic) CZE	(Finland) FIN	(Germany) GER	(Latvia) LAT	(Netherlands) NED	(Poland) POL	(Switzerland) SUI	Total
Final	2	0	0	0	0	0	0	0	0	0	0	0	0	0	0	0	0	0	0	0	0	0	0	2
Semi-final	3	1	0	0	0	0	0	0	0	0	0	0	0	0	0	0	0	0	0	0	0	0	0	4
Quarter-final	6	1	1	0	0	0	0	0	0	0	0	0	0	0	0	0	0	0	0	0	0	0	0	8
Round 3	6	2	2	2	1	1	1	1	0	0	0	0	0	0	0	0	0	0	0	0	0	0	0	16
Round 2	12	4	2	2	1	2	1	1	2	2	1	1	1	0	0	0	0	0	0	0	0	0	0	32
Total	18	5	7	2	3	2	1	1	4	3	2	1	1	4	2	1	1	1	1	1	1	1	1	64

== See also ==
- World Squash Championships
- 2022 PSA Men's World Squash Championship

Preceded by Chicago (USA); 2020–21	PSA World Championships; Cairo (Egypt); 2022	Succeeded by TBA; 2023
