= 2018–19 PSA Women's World Squash Championship =

2018–19 Women's World Championship
- 35th PSA Women's World Squash Championship
- Location: Chicago, United States
- Date: 23 February – 2 March 2019
- Website psaworldchampionships.com
- Category: PSA World Championships

Results
- Champion: (Egypt) Nour El Sherbini
- Runner-up: (Egypt) Nour El Tayeb
- Semi-finalists: (Egypt) Raneem El Weleily (France) Camille Serme

The 2018–19 PSA Women's World Squash Championship was the 2018–19 women's edition of the World Squash Championships, which serves as the individual world championship for squash players. The event took place in Chicago, United States from 23 February - 2 March 2019. It was the first World Championships to be staged under a new tour structure and has a record prize money level of $1million.

Nour El Sherbini won her third world title beating Nour El Tayeb in the final continuing the recent Egyptian domination of the sport.

== Seeds ==
1. (Egypt) Raneem El Weleily
2. (Egypt) Nour El Sherbini
3. (Egypt) Nour El Tayeb
4. (New Zealand) Joelle King
5. (France) Camille Serme
6. (England) Sarah-Jane Perry
7. (England) Laura Massaro
8. (Egypt) Nouran Gohar
9. (England) Alison Waters
10. (Wales) Tesni Evans
11. (United States) Amanda Sobhy
12. (Hong Kong) Annie Au
13. (Malaysia) Nicol David
14. (India) Joshna Chinappa
15. (England) Victoria Lust
16. (Egypt) Salma Hany
17. (Egypt) Hania El Hammamy
18. (Hong Kong) Joey Chan
19. (United States) Olivia Blatchford Clyne
20. (Egypt) Yathreb Adel
21. (England) Emily Whitlock
22. (Egypt) Mariam Metwally
23. (Egypt) Mayar Hany
24. (England) Millie Tomlinson
25. (England) Fiona Moverley
26. (Egypt) Nadine Shahin
27. (Australia) Rachael Grinham
28. (Belgium) Nele Gilis
29. (Canada) Samantha Cornett
30. (Egypt) Rowan Reda Araby
31. (Egypt) Zeina Mickawy
32. (Egypt) Nada Abbas

== Finals ==
Quarter finals
1	(Egypt) El Weleily	11	6	11	11
8	(Egypt) Gohar	4	11	4	2
12	(Hong Kong) Au	5	7	6
3	(Egypt) El Tayeb	11	11	11
4	(New Zealand) King	7	8	4
5	(France) Serme	11	11	11
10	(Wales) Evans	7	5	7
2	(Egypt) El Sherbini	11	11	11

Semi finals
1	(Egypt) El Weleily	11	6	8	11	10
3	(Egypt) El Tayeb	6	11	11	7	12
5	(France) Serme	8	6	11	11	6
2	(Egypt) El Sherbini	11	11	6	5	11

Final
3	(Egypt) El Tayeb	6	5	12	13
2	(Egypt) El Sherbini	11	11	10	15

== Draw ==
=== Top half ===
First round
1	(Egypt) Raneem El Weleily	11	11	11
(South Africa) Alexandra Fuller	6	7	3
17	(Egypt) Hania El Hammamy	11	11	11
(Hong Kong) Lee Ka Yi	4	5	4
26	(Egypt) Nadine Shahin	11	11	11
(Malaysia) Low Wee Wern	7	4	8
9	(England) Alison Waters	11	11	11
(Belgium) Tinne Gilis	5	7	4
15	(England) Victoria Lust	8	10	11	11	11
(Canada) Danielle Letourneau	11	12	6	9	7
21	(England) Emily Whitlock	11	11	11
(Czech Republic) Anna Serme	6	3	7
25	(England) Fiona Moverley	11	6	11	11
(England) Lucy Turmel	8	11	5	5
8	(Egypt) Nouran Gohar	11	11	11
(Egypt) Menna Hamed	6	4	1
7	(England) Laura Massaro	11	11	11
(New Zealand) Amanda Landers-Murphy	4	3	8
28	(Belgium) Nele Gilis	11	11	7	11	7
(France) Coline Aumard	13	4	11	9	11
30	(Egypt) Rowan Reda Araby	11	11	11
(Canada) Nicole Bunyan	2	3	4
12	(Hong Kong) Annie Au	11	11	11
(Canada) Nikki Todd	6	3	4
16	(Egypt) Salma Hany	12	11	11
(Hong Kong) Tong Tsz Wing	10	9	6
29	(Canada) Samantha Cornett	8	10	12	11
(France) Mélissa Alves	11	12	10	13
31	(England) Zeina Mickawy	11	9	11	11
(United States) Haley Mendez	6	11	6	9
3	(Egypt) Nour El Tayeb	11	11	11
(Malaysia) Rachel Arnold	2	6	6

Second round
1	(Egypt) El Weleily	11	11	11
17	(Egypt) El Hammamy	5	7	9
26	(Egypt) Shahin	4	2	9
9	(England) Waters	11	11	11
15	(England) Lust	11	11	11
21	(England) Whitlock	5	7	7
25	(England) Moverley	10	4	4
8	(Egypt) Gohar	12	11	11
7	(England) Massaro	11	11	11
(France) Aumard	6	2	9
30	(Egypt) Araby	11	5	11	1	1
12	(Hong Kong) Au	7	11	4	11	11
16	(Egypt) Hany	7	11	6	7
(France) Alves	11	9	11	11
31	(Egypt) Mickawy	2	6	4
3	(Egypt) El Tayeb	11	11	11

Third Round
1	(Egypt) El Weleily	11	11	11
9	(England) Waters	8	6	7
15	(England) Lust	8	8	9
8	(Egypt) Gohar	11	11	11
7	(England) Massaro	9	8	4
12	(Hong Kong) Au	11	11	11
(France) Alves	7	3	6
3	(Egypt) El Tayeb	11	11	11	'

Quarter finals
1	(Egypt) El Weleily	11	6	11	11
8	(Egypt) Gohar	4	11	4	2
Semi finals
1	(Egypt) El Weleily	11	6	8	11	10
3	(Egypt) El Tayeb	6	11	11	7	12
12	(Hong Kong) Au	5	7	6
3	(Egypt) El Tayeb	11	11	11

=== Bottom half ===
First round
4	(New Zealand) Joelle King	11	11	11
(Egypt) Heba El Torky	6	9	6
23	(Egypt) Mayar Hany	11	12	11	11
(Hong Kong) Ho Tze-Lok	6	14	7	7
18	(Hong Kong) Joey Chan	11	11	11
(Australia) Sarah Cardwell	6	6	6
14	(India) Joshna Chinappa	11	11	11
(Latvia) Ineta Mackeviča	5	3	7
13	(Malaysia) Nicol David	11	11	11
(Egypt) Menna Nasser	3	6	6
24	(England) Millie Tomlinson	22	11	12	8
(United States) Olivia Fiechter	24	5	10	11
27	(Australia) Rachael Grinham	10	7	4
(Scotland) Lisa Aitken	12	11	11
5	(France) Camille Serme	11	11	11
(England) Jenny Duncalf	2	4	2
6	(England) Sarah-Jane Perry	11	11	11
(Hong Kong) Vanessa Chu	7	3	6
20	(Egypt) Yathreb Adel	11	11	11
(France) Énora Villard	6	8	5
32	(Egypt) Nada Abbas	3	11	10	8
(Hong Kong) Liu Tsz-Ling	11	7	12	11
10	(Wales) Tesni Evans	13	11	11
(Netherlands) Milou van der Heijden	11	4	9
11	(United States) Amanda Sobhy	11	11	11
(England) Julianne Courtice	4	6	7
19	(United States) Olivia Blatchford Clyne	7	11	12	9	11
(Canada) Hollie Naughton	11	4	10	11	6
22	(Egypt) Mariam Metwally	9	8	11
(Australia) Christine Nunn	11	11	13
2	(Egypt) Nour El Sherbini	11	11	11
(England) Lily Taylor	8	5	9

Second round
4	(New Zealand) King	12	11	15	12	11
23	(Egypt) Hany	14	2	13	14	3
18	(Hong Kong) Chan	12	11	11
14	(India) Chinappa	10	7	7
13	(Malaysia) David	11	11	11
24	(England) Tomlinson	5	4	7
(Scotland) Aitken	2	5	7
5	(France) Serme	11	11	11
6	(England) Perry	12	12	11	12
20	(Egypt) Adel	14	10	6	10
(Hong Kong) Tsz-Ling	12	4	3	6
10	(Wales) Evans	10	11	11	11
11	(United States) Sobhy	6	11	11	11
19	(United States) Blatchford-Clyne	11	7	1	6
(Australia) Nunn	2	4	6
2	(Egypt) El Sherbini	11	11	11

Third Round
4	(New Zealand) King	11	11	15
18	(Hong Kong) Chan	7	9	13
13	(Malaysia) David	11	4	4	5
5	(France) Serme	9	11	11	11
6	(England) Perry	6	8	11	7
10	(Wales) Evans	11	11	8	11
11	(United States) Sobhy	12	3	11	8	7
2	(Egypt) El Sherbini	10	11	4	11	11

Quarter finals
4	(New Zealand) King	7	8	4
5	(France) Serme	11	11	11
Semi finals
5	(France) Serme	8	6	11	11	6
2	(Egypt) El Sherbini	11	11	6	5	11
10	(Wales) Evans	7	5	7
2	(Egypt) El Sherbini	11	11	11

== See also ==
- World Squash Championships
- 2018–19 PSA Men's World Squash Championship

Preceded by England (Manchester); 2017	PSA World Championships; United States (Chicago); 2018–19	Succeeded by Cairo (Egypt); 2019–20
