= 2019–20 PSA Women's World Squash Championship =

2019–20 Women's World Championship
- 36th PSA Women's World Squash Championship
- Location: Cairo, Egypt
- Date(s): 24 October–1 November 2019
- Category: PSA World Championships

Results
- Champion: (Egypt) Nour El Sherbini
- Runner-up: (Egypt) Raneem El Weleily
- Semi-finalists: (Egypt) Nouran Gohar (Egypt) Hania El Hammamy

The 2019–20 PSA Women's World Squash Championship was the 2019–20 women's edition of the World Squash Championships, which serves as the individual world championship for squash players. The event took place in Cairo, Egypt from 24 October to 1 November 2019.

== Seeds ==
Click on the seed number of a player to go to their draw section.

1. (Egypt) Raneem El Weleily (final)
2. (Egypt) Nour El Sherbini (champion)
3. (France) Camille Serme (quarterfinals)
4. (Egypt) Nouran Gohar (semifinals)
5. (Egypt) Nour El Tayeb (quarterfinals)
6. (New Zealand) Joelle King (quarterfinals)
7. (England) Sarah-Jane Perry (quarterfinals)
8. (United States) Amanda Sobhy (first round)
9. (Wales) Tesni Evans (third round)
10. (Hong Kong) Annie Au (third round)
11. (England) Alison Waters (third round)
12. (India) Joshna Chinappa (third round)
13. (Egypt) Salma Hany (third round)
14. (Egypt) Hania El Hammamy (semifinals)
15. (Egypt) Yathreb Adel (third round)
16. (Hong Kong) Joey Chan (first round)

17. (Belgium) Nele Gilis (second round)
18. (United States) Olivia Blatchford (second round)
19. (Egypt) Zeina Mickawy (second round)
20. (England) Emily Whitlock (first round)
21. (England) Millie Tomlinson (second round)
22. (Egypt) Nadine Shahin (second round)
23. (Egypt) Mariam Metwally (first round)
24. (Australia) Rachael Grinham (second round)
25. (Egypt) Rowan Reda Araby (second round)
26. (Belgium) Tinne Gilis (third round)
27. (Australia) Donna Lobban (second round)
28. (Canada) Hollie Naughton (second round)
29. (England) Julianne Courtice (second round)
30. (Netherlands) Milou van der Heijden (second round)
31. (France) Coline Aumard (second round)
32. (Egypt) Nada Abbas (second round)

== Draw and results ==
=== Finals ===
Semi finals
1	(Egypt) Raneem El Weleily	2	11	11	11
4	(Egypt) Nouran Gohar	11	7	7	5
14	(Egypt) Hania El Hammamy	6	2	5
2	(Egypt) Nour El Sherbini	11	11	11

Final
1	(Egypt) Raneem El Weleily	4	11	5	6
2	(Egypt) Nour El Sherbini	11	9	11	11

=== Top half ===
==== Section 1 ====
First round
1	(Egypt) Raneem El Weleily	11	11	11
(Egypt) Sana Ibrahim	3	5	4
18	(United States) Olivia Blatchford	11	11	11
(Egypt) Menna Hamed	5	6	5
29	(England) Julianne Courtice	11	11	11
(Hong Kong) Liu Tsz Ling	6	3	5
11	(England) Alison Waters	11	17	11
(United States) Marina Stefanoni	8	15	7
13	(Egypt) Salma Hany	11	11	11
(Malaysia) Rachel Arnold	6	9	9
20	(England) Emily Whitlock	11	8	14
(South Africa) Alexandra Fuller	13	11	16
25	(Egypt) Rowan Reda Araby	11	11	11
(England) Lucy Turmel	7	3	0
5	(Egypt) Nour El Tayeb	11	11	11
(France) Mélissa Alves	4	3	7

Second round
1	(Egypt) El Weleily	11	12	11
18	(United States) Blatchford	8	10	5
29	(England) Courtice	7	7	6
11	(England) Waters	11	11	11
13	(Egypt) Hany	11	11	11
(South Africa) Fuller	5	6	9
25	(Egypt) El Araby	11	9	12	8
5	(Egypt) El Tayeb	13	11	10	11

Third Round
1	(Egypt) El Weleily	11	11	11
11	(England) Waters	1	3	4
13	(Egypt) Hany	11	5	4
5	(Egypt) El Tayeb	13	11	11

Quarter finals
1	(Egypt) El Weleily	7
5	(Egypt) El Tayeb	0^{r}

==== Section 2 ====
First round
7	(England) Sarah-Jane Perry	11	11	11
(Philippines) Jemyca Aribado	5	8	6
24	(Australia) Rachael Grinham	11	11	11
(Australia) Sarah Cardwell	8	9	6
31	(France) Coline Aumard	11	12	5	11
(Canada) Danielle Letourneau	9	10	11	6
9	(Wales) Tesni Evans	11	11	11
(Canada) Nicole Bunyan	1	3	2
16	(Hong Kong) Joey Chan	12	11	6	11	8
(Malaysia) Aifa Azman	14	7	11	7	11
26	(Belgium) Tinne Gilis	11	11	11
(France) Énora Villard	5	3	5
17	(Belgium) Nele Gilis	8	11	11	11
(India) Sunayna Kuruvilla	11	7	4	5
4	(Egypt) Nouran Gohar	11	11	11	11
(Malaysia) Low Wee Wern	13	5	1	0

Second round
7	(England) Perry	11	11	11
24	(Australia) Grinham	6	5	3
31	(France) Aumard	6	4	7
9	(Wales) Evans	11	11	11
(Malaysia) Azman	7	7	3
26	(Belgium) T. Gilis	11	11	11
17	(Belgium) N. Gilis	1	5	5
4	(Egypt) Gohar	11	11	11

Third Round
7	(England) Perry	11	11	11
9	(Wales) Evans	7	6	5
26	(Belgium) T. Gilis	8	3	6
4	(Egypt) Gohar	11	11	11

Quarter finals
7	(England) Perry	11	8	11	10
4	(Egypt) Gohar	9	11	13	12

=== Bottom half ===
==== Section 3 ====
First round
3	(France) Camille Serme	11	11	11
(Egypt) Salma Youssef	6	2	2
21	(England) Millie Tomlinson	9	11	9	11	11
(Hong Kong) Lee Ka Yi	11	4	11	9	8
32	(Egypt) Nada Abbas	11	11	11
(South Africa) Milnay Louw	5	5	6
15	(Egypt) Yathreb Adel	11	11	11
(Scotland) Lisa Aitken	5	3	6
14	(Egypt) Hania El Hammamy	11	11	11
(England) Jasmine Hutton	6	6	3
27	(Australia) Donna Lobban	11	11	11
(Latvia) Ineta Mackeviča	2	6	9
30	(Netherlands) Milou van der Heijden	9	11	11	11
(Egypt) Menna Nasser	11	8	8	7
8	(United States) Amanda Sobhy	11	9	11	10	6
(Malaysia) Sivasangari Subramaniam	9	11	6	12	11

Second round
3	(France) Serme	11	11	11
21	(England) Tomlinson	4	5	8
32	(Egypt) Abbas	11	13	11	11	9
15	(Egypt) Adel	7	11	13	13	11
14	(Egypt) El Hammamy	11	11	11
27	(Australia) Lobban	6	8	9
30	(Netherlands) van der Heijden	4	11	10	9
(Malaysia) Subramaniam	11	6	12	11

Third Round
3	(France) Serme	11	11	11
15	(Egypt) Adel	6	2	6
14	(Egypt) El Hammamy	11	10	11	11
(Malaysia) Subramaniam	8	12	8	9

Quarter finals
3	(France) Serme	11	11	8	5	9
14	(Egypt) El Hammamy	7	6	11	11	11

==== Section 4 ====
First round
6	(New Zealand) Joelle King	11	11	11
(Hong Kong) Tong Tsz Wing	5	9	3
19	(Egypt) Zeina Mickawy	13	5	11	12
(Finland) Emilia Soini	11	11	3	10
22	(Egypt) Nadine Shahin	12	11	11
(Switzerland) Cindy Merlo	10	3	7
10	(Hong Kong) Annie Au	11	4	11	11
(United States) Olivia Fiechter	9	11	3	7
12	(India) Joshna Chinappa	9	12	8	11	11
(United States) Haley Mendez	11	10	11	6	6
23	(Egypt) Mariam Metwally	11	5	6	10
(Hong Kong) Ho Tze Lok	8	11	11	12
28	(Canada) Hollie Naughton	13	10	7	11	11
(Egypt) Farida Mohamed	11	12	11	4	7
2	(Egypt) Nour El Sherbini	11	11	11
(England) Rachael Chadwick	6	5	4

Second round
6	(New Zealand) King	11	9	11	11
19	(Egypt) Mickawy	7	11	6	9
22	(Egypt) Shahin	11	9	9	6
10	(Hong Kong) Au	8	11	11	11
12	(India) Chinappa	11	11	11
(Hong Kong) Ho	5	4	0
28	(Canada) Naughton	11	7	4
2	(Egypt) El Sherbini	13	11	11

Third Round
6	(New Zealand) King	8	11	11	16
10	(Hong Kong) Au	11	6	8	14
12	(India) Chinappa	5	3	6
2	(Egypt) El Sherbini	11	11	11

Quarter finals
6	(New Zealand) King	7	9	11
2	(Egypt) El Sherbini	11	11	13

== See also ==
- World Squash Championships
- 2019–20 PSA Men's World Squash Championship

Preceded by United States (Chicago); 2018–19	PSA World Championships; Cairo (Egypt); 2019–20	Succeeded by TBA; 2020–21
