= 2023 Women's British Open Squash Championship =

Squash tournament

British Open
- Women's British Open

Details
- Event name: 2023 British Open
- Location: Birmingham, England
- Venue: Edgbaston Priory Club, Birmingham Repertory Theatre
- Dates: 9 April to 16 April 2023

Women's Winner
- Prize money: $179,000
- Year: 2022–23 PSA World Tour

The Women's 2023 British Open was the women's edition of the 2023 British Open Squash Championships, which is a 2022–23 PSA World Tour event. The event took place at the Edgbaston Priory Club, Birmingham Repertory Theatre in Birmingham in England between 9 April and 16 April 2023.

Egypt's Nour El Sherbini won the title for the fourth time.

== Draw and results ==
=== Semi-finals and final ===
Semi-finals
1	(Egypt) Gohar	11	11	11
4	(New Zealand) King	3	9	1
5	(United States) Sobhy	11	5	2	11	6
2	(Egypt) El Sherbini	4	11	11	9	11

Final
1	(Egypt) Gohar	9	7	1
2	(Egypt) El Sherbini	11	11	11

=== Main Draw ===
==== Top half ====
First round
(France) Melissa Alves	11	11	11
(Switzerland) Cindy Merlo	6	6	2
1	(Egypt) Nouran Gohar
[Bye]
(Egypt) Mariam Ibrahim Metwally	7	12	11	9	14
(Hong Kong) Lee Ka Yi	11	10	6	11	12
9/16	(Belgium) Nele Gilis
[Bye]
(Egypt) Nada Abbas	7	11	12	15
(Hong Kong) Tong Tsz-Wing	11	8	10	13
(England) Lucy Turmel	12	11	11
(Egypt) Nour Aboulmakarim	10	5	7
(Malaysia) Sivasangari Subramaniam	11	11	11
(Hong Kong) Chan Sin Yuk	6	5	7
7	(England) Sarah-Jane Perry
[Bye]
(Egypt) Yathreb Adel	5	11	11	11
(England) Lucy Beecroft	11	8	6	9
6	(Egypt) Rowan Elaraby
[Bye]
(England) Jasmine Hutton	11	9	11	11
(Egypt) Fayrouz Aboelkheir	9	11	3	8
(Hong Kong) Tomato Ho	6	11	12	11	11
(Egypt) Hana Moataz	11	4	14	9	3
(Canada) Hollie Naughton	11	11	11
(France) Enora Villard	5	5	5
9/16	(United States) Olivia Fiechter
[Bye]
(England) Katie Malliff	11	11	11
(Malaysia) Rachel Arnold	8	5	7
4	(New Zealand) Joelle King
[Bye]

Second round
(France) Alves	3	8	5
1	(Egypt) Gohar	11	11	11
(Egypt) Metwally	3	ret
9/16	(Belgium) Gilis	11
(Egypt) Abbas	7	11	11	6	11
(England) Turmel	11	7	8	11	7
(Malaysia) Subramaniam	9	9	11	8
7	(England) Perry	11	11	4	11
(Egypt) Adel	9	4	2
6	(Egypt) Elaraby	11	11	11
(England) Hutton	11	3	9	3
(Hong Kong) Ho	6	11	11	11
(Canada) Naughton	11	2	4	2
9/16	(United States) Fiechter	9	11	11	11
(England) Malliff	9	3	5
4	(New Zealand) King	11	11	11

Third round
1	(Egypt) Gohar	11	11	11
9/16	(Belgium) Gilis	8	5	8
(Egypt) Abbas	7	12	3	9
7	(England) Perry	11	10	11	11
6	(Egypt) Elaraby	11	7	11	11
(Hong Kong) Ho	6	11	7	6
9/16	(United States) Fiechter	7	5	5
4	(New Zealand) King	11	11	11

Quarter-finals
1	(Egypt) Gohar	11	11	11
7	(England) Perry	5	4	6
Semi-finals
1	(Egypt) Gohar	11	11	11
4	(New Zealand) King	3	9	1
6	(Egypt) Elaraby	13	5	12	4	5
4	(New Zealand) King	11	11	10	11	11

==== Bottom half ====
First round
(South Africa) Alexandra Fuller	11	11	7	10	11
(Canada) Nicole Bunyan	5	6	11	12	9
3	(Egypt) Hania El Hammamy
[Bye]
(Wales) Emily Whitlock	13	6	13	11
(India) Joshna Chinappa	11	11	11	8
9/16	(Egypt) Farida Mohamed
[Bye]
(Malaysia) Aifa Azman	11	11	8	11
(Finland) Emilia Soini	2	7	1	4
9/16	(Egypt) Salma Hany
[Bye]
9/16	(United States) Olivia Clyne
[Bye]
6	(United States) Amanda Sobhy
[Bye]
(Egypt) Hana Ramadan	11	11	11
(Egypt) Zeina Mickawy	7	7	6
8	(England) Georgina Kennedy
[Bye]
9/16	(Belgium) Tinne Gilis
[Bye]
9/16	(Wales) Tesni Evans
[Bye]
(Egypt) Sana Ibrahim	11	11	11
(Egypt) Nadine Shahin	3	9	7
9/16	(United States) Sabrina Sobhy
[Bye]
(England) Torrie Malik	5	8	11	10
(Japan) Satomi Watanabe	11	11	7	12
2	(Egypt) Nour El Sherbini
[Bye]

Second round
(South Africa) Fuller	6	7	9
3	(Egypt) El Hammamy	11	11	11
(Wales) Whitlock	12	8	11	11
9/16	(Egypt) Mohamed	10	11	8	8
(Malaysia) Azman	8	11	9	4
9/16	(Egypt) Hany	11	4	11	11
9/16	(United States) Clyne	11	9	11	3	5
9/16	(United States) Sobhy A	8	11	7	11	11
(Egypt) Ramadan	6	10	3
8	(England) Kennedy	11	12	11
9/16	(Belgium) Gilis	11	11	9	11
9/16	(Wales) Evans	4	8	11	8
(Egypt) Ibrahim	8	7	7
9/16	(United States) Sobhy S	11	11	11
(Japan) Watanabe	13	4	8
2	(Egypt) El Sherbini	15	11	11

Third round
3	(Egypt) El Hammamy	11	11	11
(Wales) Whitlock	6	4	4
9/16	(Egypt) Hany	5	5	4
5	(United States) Sobhy A	11	11	11
8	(England) Kennedy	15	11	3	5	11
9/16	(Belgium) Gilis	13	9	11	11	6
9/16	(United States) Sobhy S	11	8	8	2
2	(Egypt) El Sherbini	9	11	11	11

Quarter-finals
3	(Egypt) El Hammamy	8	11	4
5	(United States) Sobhy A	11	13	11
Semi-finals
5	(United States) Sobhy A	11	5	2	11	6
2	(Egypt) El Sherbini	4	11	11	9	11
8	(England) Kennedy	11	5	4	11	4
2	(Egypt) El Sherbini	9	11	11	9	11

== See also ==
- 2023 Men's British Open Squash Championship
