= 2018 Women's British Open Squash Championship =

British Open
- Women's British Open

Details
- Event name: Allam British Open 2018
- Location: Hull, England
- Venue: Airco Arena

Women's Winner
- Prize money: $165,000
- Year: 2017–18 PSA World Tour

The Women's Allam British Open 2018 is the women's edition of the 2018 British Open Squash Championships, which is a 2017–18 PSA World Tour event (Prize money : $165,000 ). The event took place at the Airco Arena in Hull in England from 13 to 20 May. Nour El Sherbini won her second British Open trophy, beating Raneem El Weleily in the final.

== Seeds ==
1. (Egypt) Nour El Sherbini
2. (Egypt) Raneem El Weleily
3. (Egypt) Nour El Tayeb
4. (New Zealand) Joelle King
5. (Egypt) Nouran Gohar
6. (France) Camille Serme
7. (England) Laura Massaro
8. (England) Sarah-Jane Perry
9. (England) Alison Waters
10. (Hong Kong) Annie Au
11. (Wales) Tesni Evans
12. (United States) Olivia Blatchford
13. (India) Joshna Chinappa
14. (England) Victoria Lust
15. (Australia) Donna Urquhart
16. (Egypt) Salma Hany Ibrahim

== Draw and results ==
First round
1	(Egypt) Nour El Sherbini	11	11	11
(England) Emily Whitlock	6	4	8
16	(Egypt) Salma Hany Ibrahim	11	11	11
(Belgium) Nele Gilis	7	4	7
9	(England) Alison Waters	11	13	11
(Hong Kong) Joey Chan	5	11	6
5	(Egypt) Nouran Gohar	11	11	11
(England) Jenny Duncalf	8	5	6
7	(England) Laura Massaro	21	11	11
(Egypt) Mayar Hany	19	6	6
13	(India) Joshna Chinappa	7	3	10
(Egypt) Yathreb Adel	11	11	12
12	(United States) Olivia Blatchford	3	11	8	2
(United States) Amanda Sobhy	11	8	11	11
3	(Egypt) Nour El Tayeb	11	11	11
(Australia) Rachael Grinham	5	5	5
4	(New Zealand) Joelle King	11	11	11
(New Zealand) Amanda Landers-Murphy	3	6	7
11	(Wales) Tesni Evans	11	11	11
(South Africa) Alexandra Fuller	8	9	4
(Egypt) Mariam Ibrahim Metwally	5	9	9
15	(Australia) Donna Urquhart	11	11	11
6	(France) Camille Serme	11	11	11
(England) Millie Tomlinson	1	6	8
8	(England) Sarah-Jane Perry	11	6	11	11
(Egypt) Hania El Hammamy	5	11	7	8
10	(Hong Kong) Annie Au	17	11	11
(Canada) Samantha Cornett	15	5	1
14	(England) Victoria Lust	11	12	9	12
(England) Fiona Moverley	8	10	11	10
2	(Egypt) Raneem El Weleily	11	11	11
(Netherlands) Milou van der Heijden	6	6	6

Second round
1	(Egypt) El Sherbini	8	11	11	11
16	(Egypt) Hany	11	6	2	6
9	(England) Waters	11	9	11	11
5	(Egypt) Gouhar	4	11	2	3
7	(England) Massaro	11	15	11
(Egypt) Adel	4	13	3
(United States) Sobhy	9	6	11	12	5
3	(Egypt) El Tayeb	11	11	8	10	11
4	(New Zealand) King	9	8	6
11	(Wales) Evans	11	11	11
15	(Australia) Urquhart	9	4	7
6	(France) Serme	11	11	11
8	(England) Perry	11	11	1
10	(Hong Kong) Au	6	6	5
14	(England) Lust	11	11	5	10	4
2	(Egypt) El Weleily	9	4	11	12	11

Quarter finals
1	(Egypt) El Sherbini	6	11	11	11	11
9	(England) Waters	11	4	13	7	5
7	(England) Massaro	11	12	11
3	(Egypt) El Tayeb	9	9	6
11	(Wales) Evans	14	11	11	9	6
6	(France) Serme	16	7	7	11	11
8	(England) Perry	7	11	6	4
2	(Egypt) El Weleily	11	8	11	11

Semi-finals
1	(Egypt) El Sherbini	11	11	11	11	11
7	(England) Massaro	13	4	13	7	5
Final
1	(Egypt) El Sherbini	11	11	14
2	(Egypt) El Weleily	6	9	12
6	(France) Serme	7	11	10	6
6	(Egypt) El Weleily	11	4	12	11

== See also ==
- 2018 Men's British Open Squash Championship
