= 2017 Women's World Squash Championship =

AJ Bell Women's World Championship 2017
- 34th PSA Women's World Squash Championship
- Location: Manchester, England
- Date: April 9–17, 2017
- Category: World Championshipz
- Prize money: $ 279,000

Results
- Champion: (Egypt) Raneem El Weleily
- Runner-up: (Egypt) Nour El Sherbini
- Semi-finalists: (France) Camille Serme (Egypt) Nour El Tayeb

The 2017 Women's World Open Squash Championship is the 2017 women's edition of the World Championships, which serves as the individual world championship for squash players.

The event was held alongside the Men's World Squash Championship between 9 and 17 December 2017 inclusive. Raneem El Weleily defeated fellow Egyptian and the defending champion Nour El Sherbini in the final.

== Seeds ==
1. (Egypt) Nour El Sherbini
2. (Egypt) Raneem El Weleily
3. (France) Camille Serme
4. (England) Laura Massaro
5. (Egypt) Nouran Gohar
6. (Malaysia) Nicol David
7. (England) Sarah-Jane Perry
8. (Egypt) Nour El Tayeb
9. (New Zealand) Joelle King
10. (England) Alison Waters
11. (Hong Kong) Annie Au
12. (England) Emily Whitlock
13. (United States) Olivia Blatchford
14. (India) Joshna Chinappa
15. (England) Victoria Lust
16. (Wales) Tesni Evans

== Draw and results ==
First round
1	(Egypt) Nour El Sherbini	11	11	11
(Australia) Donna Urquhart	8	5	3
(Japan) Satomi Watanabe	11	11	5	11
12	(England) Emily Whitlock	3	2	11	9
10	(England) Alison Waters	11	11	11
(Egypt) Yathreb Adel	3	4	9
(Egypt) Mariam Metwally	4	5	9
5	(Egypt) Nouran Gohar	11	11	11
8	(Egypt) Nour El Tayeb	11	11	11
(Hong Kong) Joey Chan	3	7	5
(Egypt) Salma Hany	11	11	11	11
14	(India) Joshna Chinappa	9	13	5	9
16	(Wales) Tesni Evans	9	11	11	11
(Egypt) Nadine Shahin	11	6	4	5
4	(England) Laura Massaro	11	11	11
(Belgium) Nele Gilis	4	7	4
3	(France) Camille Serme	11	11	11
(Egypt) Zeina Mickawy	3	7	8
13	(United States) Olivia Blatchford	11	5	11	12	11
(India) Dipika Pallikal Karthik	7	11	9	14	8
9	(New Zealand) Joelle King
(Canada) Hollie Naughton	8	2	1
7	(England) Sarah-Jane Perry	11	11	11
(England) Millie Tomlinson	9	8	8
6	(Malaysia) Nicol David	11	11	11
(England) Jenny Duncalf	2	7	6
11	(Hong Kong) Annie Au	11	11	11
(Australia) Rachael Grinham	3	3	7
15	(England) Victoria Lust	11	11	6	6	11
(England) Fiona Moverley	6	2	11	11	6
2	(Egypt) Raneem El Weleily	11	11	11
(Egypt) Rowan Reda Araby	7	8	7

Second round
1	(Egypt) El Sherbini	11	11	11
(Japan) Watanabe	6	5	5
10	(England) Waters	10	11	2	8
5	(Egypt) Gohar	12	8	11	11
8	(Egypt) El Tayeb	6	11	7	11	11
(Egypt) Hany	11	8	11	7	5
16	(Wales) Evans	11	11	9	13
4	(England) Massaro	5	8	11	11
3	(France) Serme	11	11	11
13	(United States) Blatchford	4	3	6
9	(New Zealand) King	11	6	14	11
7	(England) Perry	1	11	12	6
6	(Malaysia) David	11	11	10	11
11	(Hong Kong) Au	7	3	12	6
15	(England) Lust	5	13	13	5
2	(Egypt) El Weleily	11	15	11	11

Quarter finals
1	(Egypt) El Sherbini	11	11	11
5	(Egypt) Gohar	7	3	4
8	(Egypt) El Tayeb	11	11	11
16	(Wales) Evans	9	7	9
3	(France) Serme	11	11	11
9	(New Zealand) King	4	6	4
6	(Malaysia) David	8	11	6	6
2	(Egypt) El Weleily	11	8	11	11	'

Semi finals
1	(Egypt) El Sherbini	11	8	10	11	11
8	(Egypt) El Tayeb	2	11	12	5	0
Final
1	(Egypt) El Sherbini	11	10	7	5
2	(Egypt) El Weleily	3	12	11	11
3	(France) Serme	7	9	7
2	(Egypt) El Weleily	11	11	11	5

== See also ==
2017 Men's World Squash Championship

Preceded by Egypt (El Gouna); 2016	Women's World Championships; England (Manchester); 2017	Succeeded by United States (Chicago); 2018–19
