= 2016 Women's World Open Squash Championship =

Women's World Championship 2016
- 33rd PSA Women's World Squash Championship
- Location: El Gouna, Egypt
- Date(s): April 7–14, 2017
- Category: World Championships
- Prize money: $ 165,000

Results
- Champion: (Egypt) Nour El Sherbini
- Runner-up: (Egypt) Raneem El Weleily
- Semi-finalists: (France) Camille Serme (Egypt) Nouran Gohar

The 2016 Women's World Open Squash Championship is the women's edition of the 2016 World Championships, which serves as the individual world championship for squash players.

It was originally scheduled to take place in Malaysia. In January 2017, El Gouna was selected as the championships' replacement host, with the tournament scheduled to take place alongside the men's annual El Gouna Squash Open between 7 and 14 April 2017 inclusive. It is the third time in four editions the tournament has been held after its designated year.

== Prize money and ranking points ==
For 2016, the prize purse was $165,000. The prize money and points breakdown is as follows:

Prize Money World Championship (2016)
Event	W	F	SF	QF	2R	1R
Points (PSA)	2890	1900	1155	700	410	205
Prize money	$26,647.50	$16,302.00	$10,032.00	$5,956.50	$3,526.87	$2,076.93

== Seeds ==
1. (Egypt) Nour El Sherbini (champion)
2. (France) Camille Serme (semifinals)
3. (Egypt) Raneem El Weleily (final)
4. (Egypt) Nouran Gohar (semifinals)
5. (England) Laura Massaro (quarterfinals)
6. (Malaysia) Nicol David (quarterfinals)
7. (England) Sarah-Jane Perry (quarterfinals)
8. (England) Alison Waters (second round)
9. (New Zealand) Joelle King (second round)
10. (Hong Kong) Annie Au (second round)
11. (Egypt) Nour El Tayeb (second round)
12. (India) Joshna Chinappa (quarterfinals)
13. (England) Emily Whitlock (second round)
14. (England) Victoria Lust (second round)
15. (Australia) Donna Urquhart (first round)
16. (Wales) Tesni Evans (second round)

== Draw and results ==
First round
1	(Egypt) N. El Sherbini	11	11	11
Q	(Canada) S. Cornett	2	4	6
Q	(Australia) R. Grinham	6	5	7
16	(Wales) Tesni Evans	11	11	11
14	(England) Victoria Lust	11	11	11
WC	(Egypt) Zeina Mickawy	6	3	7
Q	(England) Fiona Moverley	4	8	4
7	(England) S-J Perry	11	11	11
6	(Malaysia) Nicol David	11	12	11
(India) D. P. Karthik	9	10	6
Q	(Egypt) Rowan Elaraby	2	8	12
10	(Hong Kong) Annie Au	11	11	14
11	(Egypt) Nour El Tayeb	11	11	11
Q	(Egypt) H. El Hammamy	5	6	9
(Egypt) Nadine Shahin	4	6	5
4	(Egypt) Nouran Gohar	11	11	11
3	(Egypt) R. El Weleily	13	11	11
(England) Jenny Duncalf	11	7	5
(United States) O. Blatchford	12	11	9	10	11
15	(Australia) Donna Urquhart	10	9	11	12	8
9	(New Zealand) Joelle King	11	11	11
(Egypt) Heba El Torky	6	7	6
(Egypt) M. Metwally	7	7	3
5	(England) Laura Massaro	11	11	11
8	(England) Alison Waters	11	6	11	11
Q	(Egypt) Hana Ramadan	8	11	6	5
Q	(Japan) M. Kobayashi	11	8	10
12	(India) J. Chinappa	13	11	12
13	(England) E. Whitlock	11	11	11
Q	(France) Coline Aumard	6	8	9
(Egypt) S. Hany Ibrahim	6	5	8
2	(France) Camille Serme	11	11	11

Second round
1	(Egypt) N. El Sherbini	13	11	11
16	(Wales) Tesni Evans	11	4	4
14	(England) Victoria Lust	8	11	6	7
7	(England) S-J Perry	11	7	11	11
6	(Malaysia) Nicol David	12	11	13
10	(Hong Kong) Annie Au	10	4	11
11	(Egypt) Nour El Tayeb	8	10	9
4	(Egypt) Nouran Gohar	11	12	11
3	(Egypt) R. El Weleily	11	11	11
(United States) O. Blatchford	5	6	1
9	(New Zealand) Joelle King	7	8	11	11
5	(England) Laura Massaro	11	11	5	13
8	(England) Alison Waters	5	11	11	8	9
12	(India) J. Chinappa	11	7	9	11	11
13	(England) E. Whitlock	4	6	5
2	(France) Camille Serme	11	11	11

Quarter finals
1	(Egypt) N. El Sherbini	11	11	12
7	(England) S-J Perry	6	3	10
6	(Malaysia) Nicol David	6	5	9
4	(Egypt) Nouran Gohar	11	11	11
3	(Egypt) R. El Weleily	8	11	12	11
5	(England) Laura Massaro	11	8	10	6
12	(India) J. Chinappa	6	12	7	11	3
2	(France) Camille Serme	11	10	11	8	11

Semi finals
1	(Egypt) N. El Sherbini	11	11	13	11
4	(Egypt) Nouran Gohar	4	4	15	9
Final
1	(Egypt) N. El Sherbini	11	11	11
3	(Egypt) R. El Weleily	8	9	9
3	(Egypt) R. El Weleily	11	2	12	11
2	(France) Camille Serme	6	11	10	5

== See also ==
- World Championship
- 2016 Men's World Open Squash Championship

Preceded by Malaysia (Kuala Lumpur); 2015	Women's World Championships; Egypt (El Gouna); 2016	Succeeded by England (Manchester); 2017
