= Women's China Squash Open 2015 =

China Squash Open 2015
- 7th Women's China Open

Details
- Event name: Stars on the Bund China Open 2015
- Location: Shanghai, China
- Venue: The Peninsula Shanghai
- Website www.squashsite.co.uk/2009/chinaopen2015.htm

Women's Winner
- Category: International 50
- Prize money: $58,000
- Year: World Tour 2015

The Women's China Squash Open 2015 is the women's edition of the 2015 China Squash Open, which is a tournament of the PSA World Tour event International (prize money: 58 000 $). The event took place in Shanghai in China from 3 to 6 September. Raneem El Weleily won her first China Squash Open trophy, beating Nouran Gohar in the final.

== Prize money and ranking points ==
For 2015, the prize purse was $58,000. The prize money and points breakdown is as follows:

Prize money China Squash Open (2015)
Event	W	F	SF	QF	1R
Points (PSA)	2450	1610	980	595	350
Prize money	$9,595	$6,565	$4,290	$2,650	$1,515

== Seeds ==
1. (Malaysia) Nicol David (quarterfinals)
2. (Egypt) Raneem El Weleily (champion)'
3. (France) Camille Serme (semifinals)
4. (United States) Amanda Sobhy (semifinals)
5. (Hong Kong) Annie Au (quarterfinals)
6. (New Zealand) Joelle King (first round)
7. (England) Sarah-Jane Perry (quarterfinals)
8. (England) Emma Beddoes (quarterfinals)

== Draw and results ==
First round
1	(Malaysia) Nicol David	11	11	10	11
Q	(France) Coline Aumard	6	8	12	5
(Egypt) Nouran Gohar	14	11	11
6	(New Zealand) Joelle King	12	4	5
7	(England) Sarah-Jane Perry	11	7	7	11	11
Q	(Australia) Donna Urquhart	8	11	11	1	6
(England) Jenny Duncalf	6	11	6	6
3	(France) Camille Serme	11	9	11	11
4	(United States) Amanda Sobhy	11	11	11
Q	(Malaysia) Delia Arnold	5	1	6
WC	(Malaysia) Teh Min Jie	6	4	5
8	(England) Emma Beddoes	11	11	11
5	(Hong Kong) Annie Au	11	11	8	8	11
(Australia) Rachael Grinham	5	7	11	11	9
Q	(Egypt) Heba El Torky	11	7	8	5
2	(Egypt) Raneem El Weleily	5	11	11	11

Quarter finals
1	(Malaysia) Nicol David	11	8	5	9
(Egypt) Nouran Gohar	9	11	11	11
7	(England) Sarah-Jane Perry	7	7	7
3	(France) Camille Serme	11	11	11
4	(United States) Amanda Sobhy	11	11	11
8	(England) Emma Beddoes	4	5	8
5	(Hong Kong) Annie Au	0	2	rtd
2	(Egypt) Raneem El Weleily	11	11

Semi finals
(Egypt) Nouran Gohar	11	11	11
3	(France) Camille Serme	8	9	8
4	(United States) Amanda Sobhy	5	5	9
2	(Egypt) Raneem El Weleily	11	11	11

Final
(Egypt) Nouran Gohar	11	7	7
2	(Egypt) Raneem El Weleily	13	11	11

== See also ==
- PSA World Tour 2015
- China Squash Open
- Men's China Squash Open 2015
