= 2015 Women's World Open Squash Championship =

Women's squash event

Women's World Championship 2015
- 32nd PSA Women's World Squash Championship
- Location: Kuala Lumpur, Malaysia
- Date(s): April 25–30, 2016
- Category: World Championships
- Prize money: $ 185,000

Results
- Champion: (Egypt) Nour El Sherbini
- Runner-up: (England) Laura Massaro
- Semi-finalists: (Egypt) Raneem El Weleily (Egypt) Nouran Gohar

The 2015 Women's World Open Squash Championship is the women's edition of the 2015 World Championships, which serves as the individual world championship for squash players.

It was originally scheduled to take place in Kuala Lumpur, Malaysia from December 11 to 18, 2015; with less than two weeks' notice, the event was deemed to have been cancelled after the event promoters allegedly cited "security fears" as justification for doing so. In response, Minister of Youth and Sports Khairy Jamaluddin claimed the event's cancellation was down to the promoters' failure to attract sponsorship and accused them of attempting to blackmail the Malaysian government with a demand for event funding (including RM3.5 million ($850,000) for private security arrangements) as a result.

Upon settling an agreement with the new event promoters, the PSA confirmed the tournament was rescheduled to take place at the National Squash Centre between 25 and 30 April 2016 inclusive. It is the second time in three editions the tournament has been held after its designated year.

Nour El Sherbini won her first World Championship title, beating Laura Massaro in the final.

== Prize money and ranking points ==
For 2015, the prize purse was $185,000. The prize money and points breakdown is as follows:

Prize Money World Championship (2015)
Event	W	F	SF	QF	2R	1R
Points (PSA)	5300	3630	2150	1150	575	330
Prize money	$28,900	$17,680	$10,880	$6,460	$3,825	$2,250

== Seeds ==
1. (England) Laura Massaro (final)
2. (Malaysia) Nicol David (quarterfinals)
3. (Egypt) Raneem El Weleily (semifinals)
4. (France) Camille Serme (quarterfinals)
5. (Egypt) Nour El Sherbini (champion)
6. (Egypt) Omneya Abdel Kawy (quarterfinals)
7. (United States) Amanda Sobhy (quarterfinals)
8. (Egypt) Nouran Gohar (semifinals)
9. (Egypt) Nour El Tayeb (second round)
10. (England) Alison Waters (second round)
11. (Hong Kong) Annie Au (second round)
12. (New Zealand) Joelle King (second round)
13. (England) Sarah-Jane Perry (second round)
14. (India) Joshna Chinappa (second round)
15. (Malaysia) Delia Arnold (second round)
16. (England) Jenny Duncalf (first round)

== Draw and results ==
First round
1	(England) Laura Massaro	9	13	11	11
Q	(Mexico) Samantha Terán	11	11	6	3
(England) Victoria Lust	8	3	5
14	(India) Joshna Chinappa	11	11	11
15	(Malaysia) Delia Arnold	12	10	12	11
Q	(Egypt) Mariam Metwally	10	12	10	9
(England) Emily Whitlock	5	9	7
6	(Egypt) Omneya Abdel Kawy	11	11	11
7	(United States) Amanda Sobhy	11	11	11
Q	(New Zealand) Megan Craig	4	5	2
Q	(Hong Kong) Liu Tsz-Ling	6	7	3
9	(Egypt) Nour El Tayeb	11	11	11
12	(New Zealand) Joelle King	11	11	11
WC	(Malaysia) Low Wee Wern	9	6	7
(Wales) Tesni Evans	5	2	6
3	(Egypt) Raneem El Weleily	11	11	11
4	(France) Camille Serme	11	11	5	11
Q	(Hong Kong) Joey Chan	9	6	11	4
Q	(United States) Olivia Blatchford	4	6	6
13	(England) Sarah-Jane Perry	11	11	11
16	(England) Jenny Duncalf	6	7	9
Q	(Egypt) Nadine Shahin	11	11	11
Q	(France) Coline Aumard	12	6	5	7
8	(Egypt) Nouran Gohar	10	11	11	11
5	(Egypt) Nour El Sherbini	11	11	11
(Australia) Donna Urquhart	6	6	6
(India) Dipika Pallikal	8	9	11	11	7
11	(Hong Kong) Annie Au	11	11	6	6	11
10	(England) Alison Waters	13	11	4	11
(Egypt) Heba El Torky	11	7	11	7
(Australia) Rachael Grinham	4	11	11	1	2
2	(Malaysia) Nicol David	11	8	8	11	11

Second round
1	(England) Laura Massaro	11	11	11
14	(India) Joshna Chinappa	3	6	3
15	(Malaysia) Delia Arnold	11	8	9	8
6	(Egypt) O. Abdel Kawy	9	11	11	11
7	(United States) Amanda Sobhy	11	11	4	7	12
9	(Egypt) Nour El Tayeb	0	7	11	11	10
12	(New Zealand) Joelle King	9	5	10
3	(Egypt) R. El Weleily	11	11	12
4	(France) Camille Serme	11	11	11
13	(England) Sarah-Jane Perry	5	7	6
Q	(Egypt) Nadine Shahin	5	6	4
8	(Egypt) Nouran Gohar	11	11	11
5	(Egypt) Nour El Sherbini	11	11	6	11
11	(Hong Kong) Annie Au	5	6	11	3
10	(England) Alison Waters	9	3	5
2	(Malaysia) Nicol David	11	11	11

Quarter finals
1	(England) Laura Massaro	11	10	11	11
6	(Egypt) O. Abdel Kawy	3	12	8	7
7	(United States) Amanda Sobhy	5	11	10	7
3	(Egypt) R. El Weleily	11	5	12	11
4	(France) Camille Serme	7	10	11	11	8
8	(Egypt) Nouran Gohar	11	12	7	5	11
5	(Egypt) Nour El Sherbini	14	4	11	11
2	(Malaysia) Nicol David	12	11	3	7

Semi finals
1	(England) Laura Massaro	11	7	11	6	12
3	(Egypt) R. El Weleily	2	11	9	11	10
Final
1	(England) Laura Massaro	11	11	3	5	8
5	(Egypt) Nour El Sherbini	6	4	11	11	11
8	(Egypt) Nouran Gohar	5	5	5
5	(Egypt) Nour El Sherbini	11	11	11

== See also ==
- World Championship
- 2015 Men's World Open Squash Championship

Preceded by Egypt (Cairo); 2014	Women's World Championship; Malaysia (Kuala Lumpur); 2015	Succeeded by Egypt (El Gouna); 2016
