= Nour El Sherbini =

Egyptian squash player (born 1995)

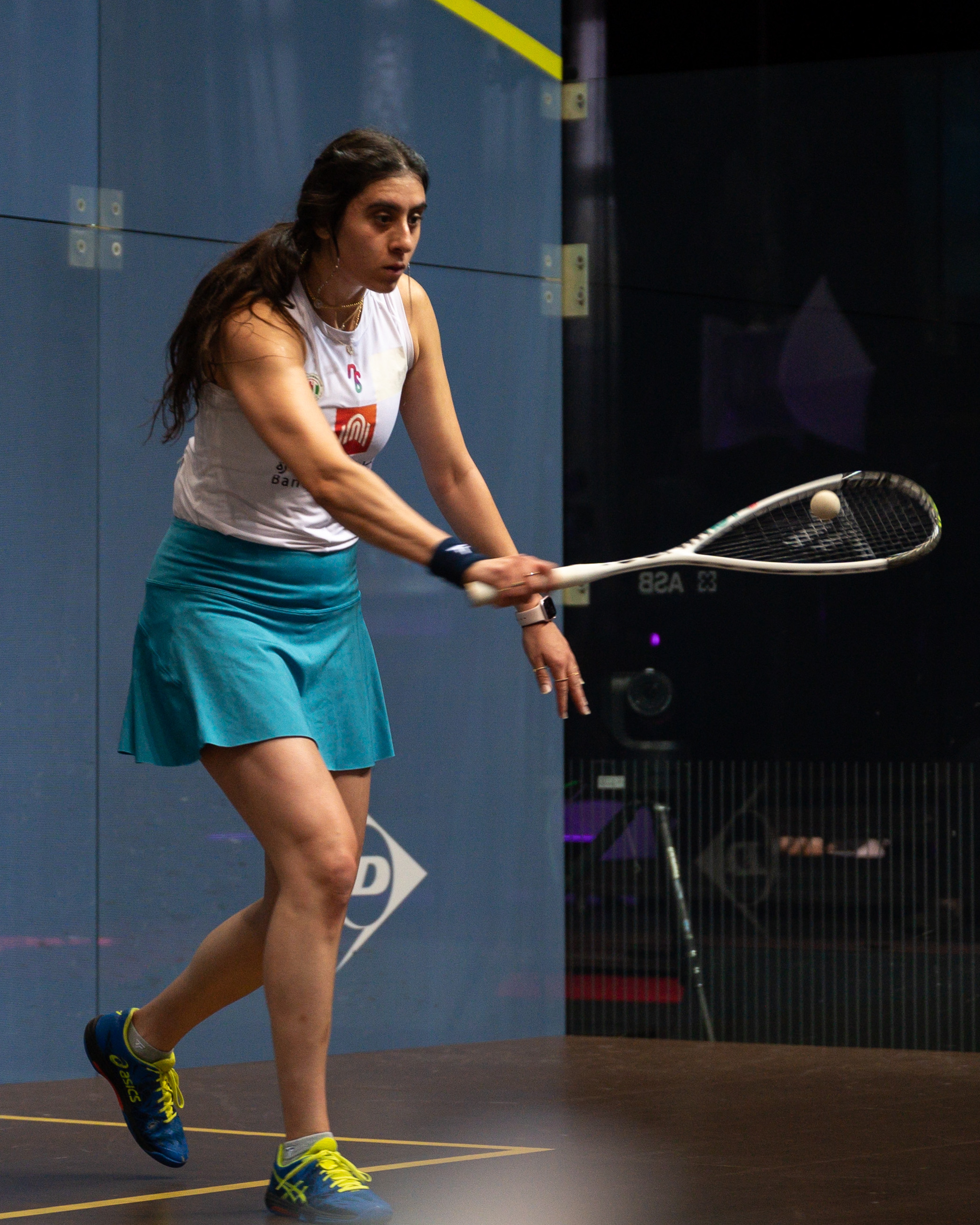
- Nour El Sherbini in 2024

Personal information
- Full name: Nour Atef Ahmed Zaki El Sherbini
- Nickname: The Warrior Princess
- Born: 1 November 1995 (age 30) Alexandria, Egypt
- Height: 5 ft 9 in (175 cm)
- Website: www.nourelsherbini.com

Sport
- Country: Egypt
- Handedness: Right Handed
- Turned pro: 2009
- Coached by: Omar el Sherbini, Roushdy Mabrouk
- Racquet used: Tecnifibre Carboflex 125ns X-top v2

Women's singles
- Highest ranking: No. 1 (1 November 2020)
- Current ranking: No. 2 (16 February 2026)
- Title: 47
- World Open: W (2015, 2016, 2018–19, 2019–20, 2020–21, 2022, 2023, 2025)
Medal record
Women's squash
Representing Egypt
World Championships
Gold medal – first place	2015 Kuala Lumpur	Singles
Gold medal – first place	2016 El Gouna	Singles
Gold medal – first place	2018–19 Chicago	Singles
Gold medal – first place	2019–20 Cairo	Singles
Gold medal – first place	2020–21 Chicago	Singles
Gold medal – first place	2022 Cairo	Singles
Gold medal – first place	2023 Chicago	Singles
Gold medal – first place	2025 Chicago	Singles
Silver medal – second place	2013 Penang	Singles
Silver medal – second place	2017 Manchester	Singles
Silver medal – second place	2024 Cairo	Singles
Silver medal – second place	2026 Giza	Singles
World Team Championships
Gold medal – first place	2012 Nîmes	Team
Gold medal – first place	2016 Issy-les-Moulineaux	Team
Gold medal – first place	2018 Dalian	Team
Gold medal – first place	2022 Cairo	Team
Gold medal – first place	2024 Hong Kong	Team
Bronze medal – third place	2014 Niagara-on-the-Lake	Team

Nour Atef Ahmed Zaki El Sherbini (Egyptian Arabic: نور عاطف أحمد زكى الشربينى; born 1 November 1995) is an Egyptian professional squash player.

She holds the record with Malaysian Nicol David for having won the most women's world individual titles. The eight world titles were achieved in; 2015, 2016, 2018–19, 2019–20, 2020–21, 2022, 2023 and 2025.

She has been ranked as the world No. 1 in women's singles by the Women's Squash Association (WSA), on several occasions, has won the British Open four times and as of May 2025, she has 45 PSA titles to her name.

== Early life ==
Nour was born and raised in Alexandria, Egypt. She started playing squash when she was 6 years old, and was already participating in tournaments before she was 8. She trained at Alexandria Sporting Club (ASC) in Alexandria.

Her brother Omar el Sherbini kept her interested in squash as she would spend time watching him and learning from his sessions. She has said that sports runs in her family: "My father used to be a football player and a good swimmer. Also my mum was a good athlete".

== Junior career ==
Nour won the British Junior Open Under-13 category in 2007 and 2008. On 28 November 2009, Sherbini was awarded the 2009 Young WISPA Squash Player of the Year. As she explains: "By time I gained more confidence and become [sic.] more steady that made me able to win most of the titles of the local tournaments in Egypt, till reaching the British open and my first international titles. My first BJO title was such a push for more titles starting from under 13 years old till under 15, titles in a row".

A few months after her 13th birthday, she joined WISPA in early 2009, and in April she announced her arrival by losing to world top liner Engy Kheirallah in a tight 3/1 at the Heliopolis Open. After having reached the final of the ATCO Miro event in June, also in Cairo, Sherbini was stopped by Kheirallah in her bid for her first WISPA Tour title. On August 2, 2009, at 13, Sherbini became the youngest world champion in the history of the sport when she won the women's title at the World Junior squash Championships (U-19). As she explained: "Reaching the most important moment of my life, I was chosen to represent Egypt in the world open junior championship taking place in Chennai, India. To win the title was a dream, but to take it and feel the taste of victory was a dream came true. Adding the World Team title made it looks extraordinary".

== Professional career ==
=== Entering the world's top 10 ===
In 2012 on the WSA World Tour, Nour El Sherbini rose 208 places in the women's rankings to occupy the world No. 7 spot at the age of 16.

Her first professional competition came in the Heliopolis Open as a qualifier, and she made it to the first round. The following January she won the British Junior Under-19 Open at the age of 14, at which point she had already broken into the world's top 50. She returned to Heliopolis in 2010 to claim her first WSA title. The following year, still climbing the rankings and sitting at No. 36, she won the Alexandria International Open as 5th seed and finished the year by reaching round two of the World Open as a qualifier.

In 2012 Sherbini made a semi-final appearances in the Tournament of Champions in New York, as well as in the KL Open in Malaysia. These results tipped Sherbini into the world top 20, and she reached the final of the WSA World Series Platinum Allam British Open event at the O2 Arena, where she lost to Nicol David. On 19 May 2012, Sherbini defeated Raneem El Weleily to become the youngest-ever British Open women's finalist.

=== World No. 1 and world titles ===
El Sherbini won her first world title at the 2015 Women's World Open Squash Championship in Kuala Lumpur, defeating English player Laura Massaro in the final. By April 2016 she reached a world ranking of No. 1, won her first British Open and won a second world title at the 2016 Women's World Open Squash Championship in El Gouna.

Five consecutive world titles were secured in 2018–19, 2019–20, 2020–21, 2022 and 2023. In the May 2023 competition, she defeated the number 4 seed Joelle King in the semi final and defeating the number 1 seed Nouran Gohar in the final. It was her seventh World Championship (and fifth in a row) taking her to second in the all-time list of World championship wins behind Nicol David. She also won her fourth British Open title by securing victory at the 2023 Women's British Open Squash Championship.

=== 2025 record equaling feat ===
El Sherbini was on the verge of being classed as the greatest women's player of all-time after winning an eighth world title at the 2025 Women's World Squash Championship in Chicago, defeating Hania El Hammamy in the final. The win equaled the all-time record set by Malaysian Nicol David from 2005 to 2014.

She won her 45th PSA title after securing victory in the Hong Kong Open during the 2025–26 PSA Squash Tour. In 2026 El Sherbini lost her world title to Amina Orfi the 2026 World Championship final.

== National representation ==
=== WSF World Junior Team championships ===
She won her first world team title, the gold medal with the Egyptian team at the 2009 Women's World Junior Team Championships. 2011, She was with the Egyptian team that won their fifth title at the WSF World Junior Team title. Nour's last appearance with the junior national team in World Junior Team Championships was at the 2013 edition.

=== WSF World Team Championships ===
In 2012, she was part of the team that regained the world team title following a gold medal at the 2012 WSF World Team Championships. 2014, she was part of the Egyptian team that won the bronze medal at the 2014 Women's World Team Squash Championships. 2016, she won her second world team title as part of the Egyptian team that won the gold medal at the 2016 Women's World Team Squash Championships. 2018, she won her third world team title as part of the Egyptian team that won the 2018 Women's World Team Squash Championships. In 2022, she was part of the Egyptian team that won the 2022 Women's World Team Squash Championships. It was her fourth world team title.

In December 2024, El Sherbini helped Egypt win their fourth consecutive title at the 2024 Women's World Team Squash Championships.

== World Squash Championships ==
=== Finals: 11 (8 titles, 3 runner-up) ===
Outcome	Year	Location	Opponent in the final	Score in the final
Runner-up	2013	Penang, Malaysia	(England) Laura Massaro	11–7, 6–11, 11–9, 5–11, 11–9
Winner	2015	Kuala Lumpur, Malaysia	(England) Laura Massaro	6–11, 4–11, 11–3, 11–5, 11–8
Winner	2016	El Gouna, Egypt	(Egypt) Raneem El Weleily	11–8, 11–9, 11–9
Runner-up	2017	Manchester, England	(Egypt) Raneem El Weleily	3–11, 12–10, 11–7, 11–5
Winner	2018–19	Chicago, USA	(Egypt) Nour El Tayeb	11–6, 11–5, 10–12, 15–13
Winner	2019–20	Cairo, Egypt	(Egypt) Raneem El Weleily	11–4, 9–11, 11–5, 11–6
Winner	2020–21	Chicago, USA	(Egypt) Nouran Gohar	11–5, 11–8, 8–11, 11–9
Winner	2022	Cairo, Egypt	(Egypt) Nouran Gohar	7–11, 11–7, 11–8, 11–7
Winner	2023	Chicago, USA	(Egypt) Nouran Gohar	11–6, 11–4, 12–10
Runner-up	2024	Cairo, Egypt	(Egypt) Nouran Gohar	8–11, 11–9, 7–11, 5–11
Winner	2025	Chicago, USA	(Egypt) Hania El Hammamy	11–5, 11–9, 4–11, 11–7

== World Tour Finals ==
=== Finals: 4 (2 titles, 2 runner-up) ===
Outcome	Year	Location	Opponent in the final	Score in the final
Runner-up	2017	Dubai, United Arab Emirates	(England) Laura Massaro	8–11, 10–12, 5–11
Winner	2018	Dubai, United Arab Emirates	(Egypt) Raneem El Weleily	3–11, 8–11, 11–7, 11–4, 11–6
Winner	2022	Cairo, Egypt	(Egypt) Nouran Gohar	11–6, 11–8, 11–5
Runner-up	2024	Bellevue, United States	(Egypt) Nouran Gohar	11–7, 2–11, 9–11, 10–11

== Major World Series final appearances ==
=== Major Finals (29) ===
Major tournaments include:

- Top-tier PSA World Tour tournaments (Diamond+Platinum/World Series/Super Series)

=== British Open: 7 finals (4 titles, 3 runner-up) ===
Outcome	Year	Opponent in the final	Score in the final
Runner-up	2012	(Malaysia) Nicol David	6–11, 6–11, 6–11
Winner	2016	(Egypt) Nouran Gohar	11–7, 9–11, 7–11, 11–6, 11–8
Winner	2018	(Egypt) Raneem El Weleily	11–6, 11–9, 14–12
Winner	2021	(Egypt) Nouran Gohar	9–11, 13–11, 5–11, 11–7, 11–2
Winner	2023	(Egypt) Nouran Gohar	11–9, 11–7, 11–1
Runner-up	2024	(Egypt) Nouran Gohar	6–11, 15–17, 11–3, 11–7, 4–11
Runner-up	2025	(Egypt) Nouran Gohar	11–9, 10–12, 11–7, 11–13, 4–11

=== US Open: 6 finals (1 title, 5 runner-up) ===
Outcome	Year	Opponent in the final	Score in the final
Runner-up	2014	(Malaysia) Nicol David	5–11, 10–12, 10–12
Runner-up	2016	(France) Camille Serme	8–11, 11–7, 10–12, 9–11
Runner-up	2018	(Egypt) Raneem El Weleily	6–11, 9–11, 8–11
Runner-up	2022	(Egypt) Nouran Gohar	7–11, 11–9, 7–11, 6–11
Winner	2023	(Egypt) Hania El Hammamy	11–6, 11–6, 11–7
Runner-up	2024	(Egypt) Nouran Gohar	8–11, 9–11, 12–10, 7–11

=== Hong Kong Open: 2 finals (2 titles, 0 runner-up) ===
Outcome	Year	Opponent in the final	Score in the final
Winner	2017	(Egypt) Raneem El Weleily	11–5, 11–8, 11–5
Winner	2025	(United States) Olivia Weaver	11–5, 11–5, 11–7

=== Qatar Classic: 4 finals (1 title, 3 runner-up) ===
Outcome	Year	Opponent in the final	Score in the final
Runner-up	2015	(England) Laura Massaro	11–8, 12–14, 11–9, 8–11, 11–9
Runner-up	2023	(Egypt) Hania El Hammamy	11–9, 9–11, 11–9, 9–11, 6–11
Winner	2024	(Egypt) Nouran Gohar	10–12, 5–11, 11–6, 11–9, 11–6
Runner-up	2025	(Egypt) Hania El Hammamy	6–11, 13–15, 8–11

=== Windy City Open: 6 finals (3 titles, 3 runner-up) ===
Outcome	Year	Opponent in the final	Score in the final
Runner-up	2016	(Egypt) Raneem El Weleily	11–9, 6–11, 3–11, 6–11
Runner-up	2017	(Egypt) Raneem El Weleily	12–10, 7–11, 7–11, 7–11
Winner	2020	(Egypt) Raneem El Weleily	11–8, 8–11, 11–8, 6–11, 11–9
Runner-up	2022	(Egypt) Hania El Hammamy	11–5, 17–15, 5–11, 6–11, 5–11
Winner	2024	(Egypt) Nouran Gohar	11–7, 6–11, 11–4, 11–4
Winner	2026	(Egypt) Amina Orfi	9–11, 10–12, 13–11, 11–5, 11–8

=== El Gouna International: 3 finals (1 title, 2 runner-up) ===
Outcome	Year	Opponent in the final	Score in the final
Runner-up	2018	(Egypt) Raneem El Weleily	11–3, 10–12, 7–11, 5–11
Winner	2021	(Egypt) Nouran Gohar	11–7, 11–8, 11–5
Runner-up	2024	(Egypt) Nouran Gohar	6–11, 13–11, 11–6, 11–6

=== Tournament of Champions: 6 finals (5 titles, 1 runner-up) ===
Outcome	Year	Opponent in the final	Score in the final
Winner	2016	(United States) Amanda Sobhy	11–4, 9–11, 12–10, 11–8
Winner	2018	(Egypt) Nour El Tayeb	2–11, 11–6, 4–11, 11–7, 11–7
Winner	2019	(Egypt) Raneem El Weleily	11–9, 11–8, 11–8
Runner-up	2020	(France) Camille Serme	8–11, 6–11, 7–11,
Winner	2023	(Egypt) Nouran Gohar	11–9, 3–1^{rtd.}
Winner	2024	(Egypt) Nouran Gohar	9–11, 4–11, 11–5, 11–5, 11–5

=== Paris Squash: 2 finals (2 titles, 0 runner-up) ===
Outcome	Year	Opponent in the final	Score in the final
Winner	2023	(Egypt) Nouran Gohar	7–11, 11–4, 11–8, 11–5
Winner	2024	(Egypt) Nouran Gohar	6–11, 11–3, 8–11, 11–7, 11–4

== Awards and achievements ==
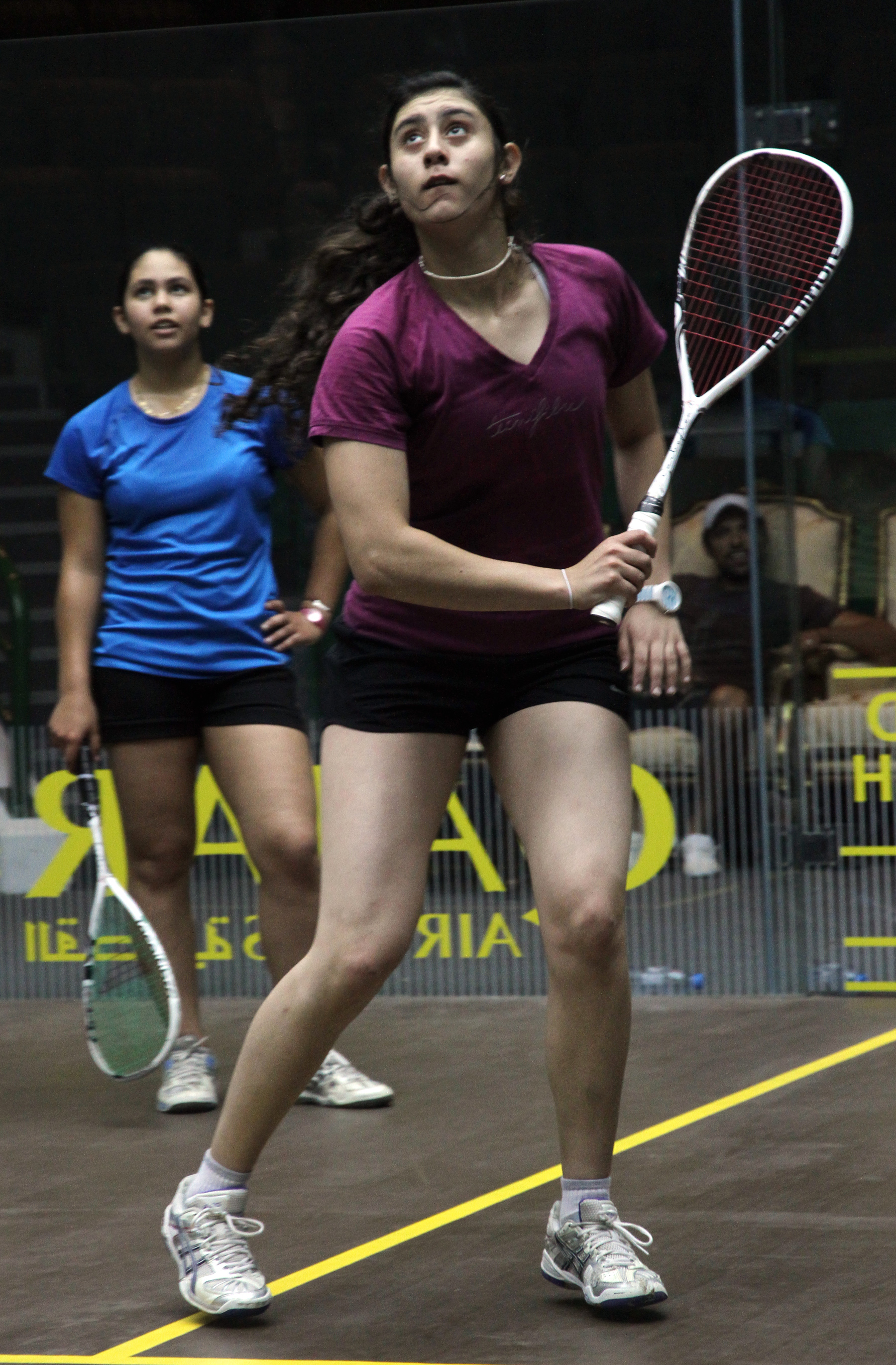
Nour El Sherbini at the World Junior Squash Championships in Doha, 2012

- British Junior Open Champion GU13 2007
- British Junior Open Champion GU13 2008
- British Junior Open Champion GU15 2009
- Atco Miro No.1 WISPA Runner-up 2009
- World Junior Champion 2009
- Young WISPA Player of the Year 2009
- Young Female Player of the Year 2009
- British Junior Open Champion GU19 2010
- Heliopolis Open WISPA Champion 2010
- High WISPA Ranking of 25 October 2010
- World Junior Runner-up 2011
- Alexandria International Open WISPA Champion 2011
- British Junior Open Champion GU19 2012
- High WSA Ranking of 7 June 2012
- Youngest ever to reach the final of the British open in 2012
- The first Egyptian to reach the final of the British Open in 2012
- Youngest ever to be in the top ten on the world reaching No. 7 in June 2012
- World Junior Champion 2012
- The first Egyptian to win the British Open (in 2016)
- PSA Player of The Year 2017/18

Sporting positions
Preceded by Laura Massaro	World No. 1 May 2016 – November 2018	Succeeded by Raneem El Weleily
Awards and achievements
Preceded by Annie Au	WISPA Young Player of the Year; 2009	Succeeded by Nour El Tayeb
Awards and achievements
Preceded by Nour El Tayeb	WSA Breakthrough Player of the Year; 2012	Succeeded by Sarah-Jane Perry
