= Men's China Squash Open 2015 =

China Squash Open 2015
- 5th Men's China Open

Details
- Event name: Stars on the Bund China Open 2015
- Location: Shanghai, China
- Venue: The Peninsula Shanghai

Men's Winner
- Category: International 100
- Prize money: $100,000
- Year: World Tour 2016

The Men's China Squash Open 2015 is the men's edition of the 2015 China Squash Open, which is a tournament of the PSA World Tour event International (Prize money : $100 000 ). The event took place in Shanghai in China from 3 September to 6 September. Grégory Gaultier won his first China Squash Open trophy, beating Marwan El Shorbagy in the final.

== Prize money and ranking points ==
For 2015, the prize purse was $100,000. The prize money and points breakdown is as follows:

Prize Money China Open (2015)
Event	W	F	SF	QF	1R
Points (PSA)	1750	1150	700	430	250
Prize money	$17,575	$12,025	$7,860	$4,855	$2,775

== Seeds ==
1. (Egypt) Mohamed El Shorbagy (first round)
2. (France) Grégory Gaultier (champion)
3. (Germany) Simon Rösner (first round)
4. (Egypt) Omar Mosaad (semifinals)
5. (England) Peter Barker (first round)
6. (Egypt) Tarek Momen (first round)
7. (France) Mathieu Castagnet (quarterfinals)
8. (Spain) Borja Golán (quarterfinals)

== Draw and results ==
First round
1	(Egypt) Mohamed El Shorbagy	14	10	11	7	6
(Hong Kong) Max Lee	12	12	7	11	11
(Egypt) Marwan El Shorbagy	11	14	11
6	(Egypt) Tarek Momen	8	12	8
8	(Spain) Borja Golán	11	11	11
(England) Daryl Selby	9	7	7
WC	(Malaysia) Ivan Yuen	3	8	6
4	(Egypt) Omar Mosaad	11	11	11
3	(Germany) Simon Rösner	11	3	3	8
Q	(Hong Kong) Leo Au	9	11	11	11
Q	(Scotland) Greg Lobban	3	1	11	9
7	(France) Mathieu Castagnet	11	11	7	11
5	(England) Peter Barker	12	5	3
Q	(England) Tom Richards	14	11	11
Q	(India) Saurav Ghosal	9	8	7
2	(France) Grégory Gaultier	11	11	11

Quarter finals
(Hong Kong) Max Lee	9	8	5
(Egypt) Marwan El Shorbagy	11	11	11
8	(Spain) Borja Golán	5	10	9
4	(Egypt) Omar Mosaad	11	12	11
Q	(Hong Kong) Leo Au	11	9	11	11
7	(France) Mathieu Castagnet	5	11	6	6
Q	(England) Tom Richards	9	4	8
2	(France) Grégory Gaultier	11	11	11

Semi finals
(Egypt) Marwan El Shorbagy	5	11	14	8	7
4	(Egypt) Omar Mosaad	11	9	12	11	8
Q	(Hong Kong) Leo Au	6	4	4
2	(France) Grégory Gaultier	11	11	11

Final
(Egypt) Marwan El Shorbagy	6	2	4
2	(France) Grégory Gaultier	11	11	11

== See also ==
- PSA World Tour 2015
- China Squash Open
- Women's China Squash Open 2015
