= Raneem El Weleily =

Egyptian squash player

Raneem El Welily
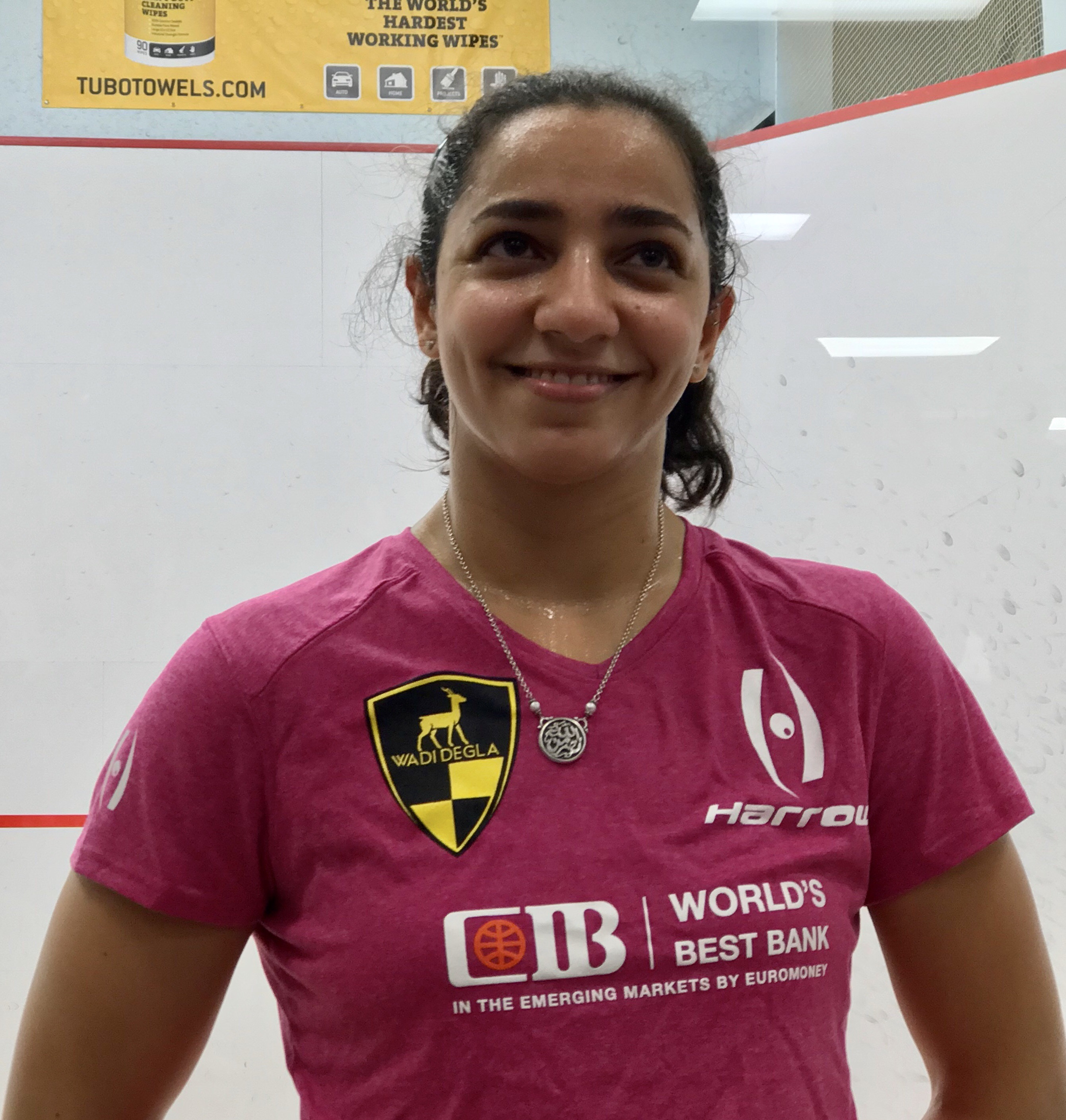

Personal information
- Born: Raneem Mohamed Yasser Saad El Din El Walily; 1 January 1989 (age 37) Alexandria, Egypt
- Height: 5 ft 3 in (160 cm)

Sport
- Country: Egypt
- Handedness: Right Handed
- Turned pro: 2003
- Coached by: Haitham Effat, Ahmed Faragallah
- Retired: 2020
- Racquet used: Harrow

Women's singles
- Highest ranking: No. 1 (September, 2015)
- Title: 23
- Tour final: 35
- World Open: W (2017)
Medal record
Women's squash
Representing Egypt
World Championships
Gold medal – first place	2017 Manchester	Singles
Silver medal – second place	2014 Cairo	Singles
Silver medal – second place	2016 El Gouna	Singles
Silver medal – second place	2019–20 Cairo	Singles
Bronze medal – third place	2012 Grand Cayman	Singles
Bronze medal – third place	2013 Penang	Singles
Bronze medal – third place	2015 Kuala Lumpur	Singles
Bronze medal – third place	2018–19 Chicago	Singles
World Team Championships
Gold medal – first place	2008 Cairo	Team
Gold medal – first place	2012 Nîmes	Team
Gold medal – first place	2016 Paris	Team
Gold medal – first place	2018 Dalian	Team
Silver medal – second place	2006 Edmonton	Team
Bronze medal – third place	2014 Niagara-on-the-Lake	Team
- Updated on March, 2017

Raneem Mohamed Yasser Saad El Din El Welily (Arabic: رَنِيم مُحَمَّد يَاسِر سَعْد الدِّين الْوَلِيلِيّ; born 1 January 1989, in Alexandria, Egypt) is a former professional squash player from Egypt. She reached a career-high world ranking of No. 1 in September 2015. She is a three-time finalist at the World Open, in 2014, 2016, and 2019–2020. She became the World Champion in 2017, after defeating her compatriot Nour El Sherbini in the finals.

== Career ==
=== Junior career ===
Alexandria-born El Welily emerged as one of the most skillful players on the PSA Women's World Tour since turning professional in 2002. Raneem followed her brother into squash at the age of six and first played for Egypt in the World Juniors 2001 in Penang, Malaysia, then aged ten.

Two years later when the event was played in Cairo she was part of the winning Egyptian squad, and in 2004 she represented the senior team that placed fourth in the World Teams in Amsterdam.

The highlight of El Welily's junior career was when she became the world junior champion in Herentals, Belgium in 2005. She was voted WISPA Young Player of the Year, for 2005, receiving that award for a second consecutive year. She lifted the World Junior Championship twice, in 2005 and 2007. Raneem also is a 6-time British Junior Open winner.

=== Professional career ===
El Welily won her first senior Tour title in 2009 when she triumphed at the Heliopolis Open in Egypt.

That win helped catapult her into the world's top twenty and, after making the semi-finals of the Malaysian Open despite being a qualifier, she promptly rose into the top ten. The Egyptian shot-maker doubled her Tour title tally in 2011 and four months later won the biggest event of her career so far, by topping then-World No. 2 Jenny Duncalf to lift the prestigious Carol Weymuller Open.

2012 saw El Welily reach World No. 2 for the first time and in September of that year she won her first World Series title by defeating World No.1 Nicol David in the final in the CIMB Malaysian Open. Also in 2012, she was part of the team that regained the world team title after winning a gold medal at the 2012 Women's World Team Squash Championships; this was her second world team title success.

She beat David again in the 2013 Cleveland Classic final to lift another crown. El Welily amassed three runner-up spots in the remainder of 2013, with David winning all three, before she won her second Malaysian Open title in 2014, beating Nour El Tayeb in the final.

In 2014, she was part of the Egyptian team that won the bronze medal at the 2014 Women's World Team Squash Championships.

She reached the final of the World Championship in December 2014 but David proved to be a stumbling block once more as she denied El Welily squash's biggest crown. Undeterred, El Welily had a terrific opening to 2015 as she won the Tournament of Champions, the Windy City Open and the Alexandria International to close the gap on David's hold on the World No.1 ranking. In May 2015 she was named as the PSA Women's Player of the Year for the 2014/15 season. In September 2015, Raneem surpassed David to clinch the World No.1 ranking in the PSA Women's World Ranking.

In 2016, she won her third world team title as part of the Egyptian team that won the gold medal at the 2016 Women's World Team Squash Championships. In 2018, she was part of the Egyptian team that won the 2018 Women's World Team Squash Championships. It was her fourth world team title.

El Welily announced her retirement from professional competition in June 2020.

== Personal life ==
El Welily was born and raised in Alexandria. She is married to Tarek Momen, a professional squash player. She graduated from the German School in Alexandria and between training sessions she also finds time to indulge her interests of music, jigsaw puzzles, and sudoku.

== Titles (24) ==
Outcome	Year	Tournament	Location	Opponent in the final	Score in the final
Winner	2009	Heliopolis Open	Cairo, Egypt	(Egypt) Engy Kheirallah	7–11, 12–10, 11–6, 11–5
Winner	2011	Carol Weymuller Open	Brooklyn, United States	(England) Jenny Duncalf	11–7, 15–13, 11–4
Winner	2011	Hurghada International	Hurghada, Egypt	(Egypt) Omneya Abdel Kawy	11–5, 12–10, 11–9
Winner	2012	Malaysian Open Squash Championships	Kuala Lumpur, Malaysia	(Malaysia) Nicol David	12–10, 11–13, 11–6, 11–2
Winner	2012	Greenwich Open	New York City, United States	(New Zealand) Joelle King	11–8, 11–8, 6–11, 11–4
Winner	2013	Cleveland Classic	Cleveland, United States	(Malaysia) Nicol David	3–11, 11–5, 9–11, 11–5, 11–9
Winner	2014	Malaysian Open Squash Championships	Kuala Lumpur, Malaysia	(Egypt) Nour El Tayeb	7–11, 11–3, 12–10, 2–11, 11–7
Winner	2015	Tournament of Champions	New York City, United States	(England) Alison Waters	9–11, 12–10, 11–4, 11–4
Winner	2015	Metro Squash Windy City Open	Chicago, United States	(Malaysia) Nicol David	12–14, 12–10, 11–7, 11–7
Winner	2015	Alexandria International	Alexandria, Egypt	(Egypt) Omneya Abdel Kawy	11–6, 11–5, 11–9
Winner	2015	China Open	Shanghai, China	(Egypt) Nouran Gohar	13–11, 11–7, 11–7
Winner	2016	Metro Squash Windy City Open	Chicago, United States	(Egypt) Nour El Sherbini	9–11, 11–6, 11–3, 11–6
Winner	2016	Al-Ahram International	Cairo, Egypt	(Egypt) Nour El Sherbini	11–5, 11–9, 9–11, 9–11, 11–7
Winner	2016	Wadi Degla Open	Cairo, Egypt	(Egypt) Nouran Gohar	11–8, 7–11, 11–4, 11–5
Winner	2017	Metro Squash Windy City Open	Chicago, United States	(Egypt) Nour El Sherbini	10–12, 11–7, 11–7, 11–7
Winner	2017	World Open	Manchester, England	(Egypt) Nour El Sherbini	3–11, 12–10, 11–7, 11–5
Winner	2018	El Gouna International	El Gouna, Egypt	(Egypt) Nour El Sherbini	5–11, 11–8, 11–3, 14–12
Winner	2018	China Squash Open	Shanghai, China	(France) Camille Serme	11–5, 8–11, 11–6, 11–5
Winner	2018	United States Open (squash)	Philadelphia, United States	(Egypt) Nour El Sherbini	11–6, 11–9, 11–8
Winner	2019	Black Ball Squash Open	Cairo, Egypt	(Egypt) Nour El Sherbini	9–11, 11–2, 6–11, 11–1, 11–5
Winner	2019	DPD Open (squash)	Eindhoven, Netherlands	(Egypt) Nour El Sherbini	10–12, 9–11, 11–8, 11–8, 11–8
Winner	2019	El Gouna International	El Gouna, Egypt	(Egypt) Nouran Gohar	11–8, 7–11, 12–10, 11–6
Winner	2019	PSA World Tour Finals	Cairo, Egypt	(France) Camille Serme	3–11, 8–11, 11–7, 11–4, 11–6
Winner	2019	Netsuite Open	San Francisco, United States	(Egypt) Nour El Tayeb	11–5, 11–5, 11–5

== World Open ==
=== Finals: 4 (1 title, 3 runners-up) ===
Outcome	Year	Location	Opponent in the final	Score in the final
Runner-up	2014	Cairo, Egypt	(Malaysia) Nicol David	11–5, 8–11, 11–7, 12–14, 5–11
Runner-up	2016	El Gouna, Egypt	(Egypt) Nour El Sherbini	8–11, 9–11, 9–11
Winner	2017	Manchester, England	(Egypt) Nour El Sherbini	3–11, 12–10, 11–7, 11–5
Runner-up	2019–20	Cairo, Egypt	(Egypt) Nour El Sherbini	11–4, 9–11, 11–5, 11–6

== See also ==
- Official Women's Squash World Ranking
- WISPA Awards

Sporting positions
Preceded by Nicol David	World No. 1 September 2015 – December 2015	Succeeded by Laura Massaro
Awards and achievements
Preceded by Laura Massaro	PSA Women's Player of the Year; 2014	Succeeded by Current hoder
Preceded by —	WISPA Young Player of the Year; 2004–2005	Succeeded by Tenille Swartz
Preceded by Kasey Brown	WISPA Most Improved Player of the Year; 2011	Succeeded by Alison Waters
