= Katie Malliff =

English squash player (born 2003)

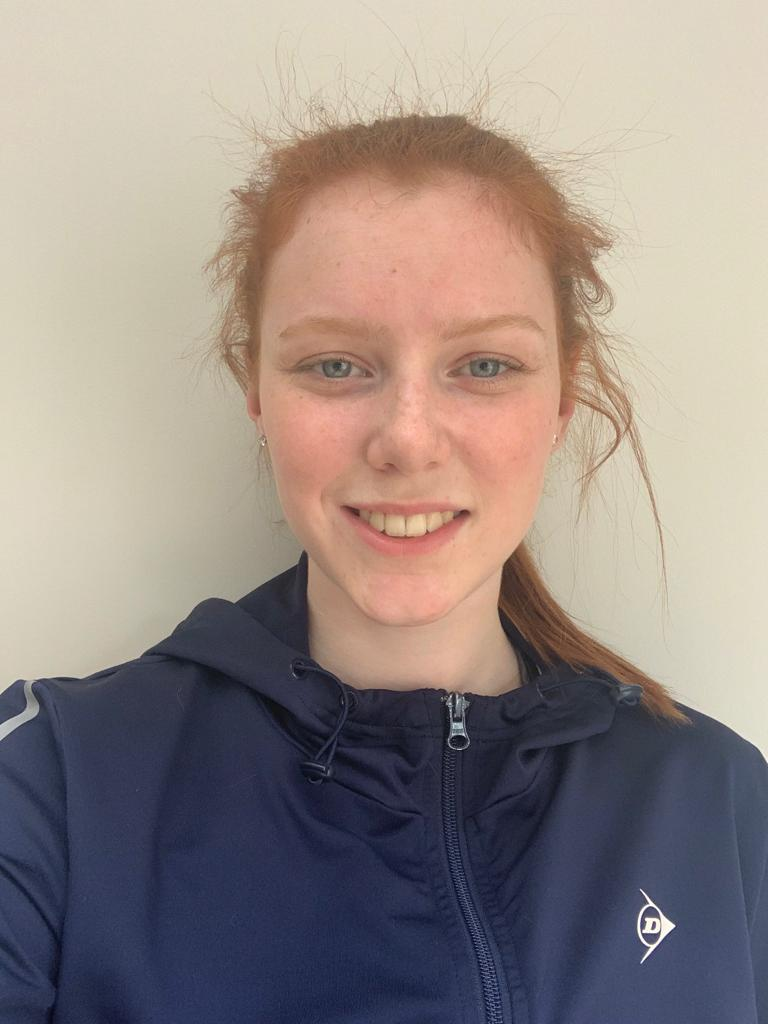

Personal information
- Nickname: The Flame
- Born: 19 April 2003 (age 23) Wendover, England
- Height: 5’ 8”
- Website: www.instagram.com/katiemalliff

Sport
- Country: England
- Turned pro: 2018
- Coached by: No coach at present
- Retired: Active
- Racquet used: Dunlop

Women's singles
- Highest ranking: No. 24 (March 2025)
- Current ranking: No. 25 (14 July 2025)
- Title: 4
- Tour final: 7

Katie Malliff (born 19 April 2003) is an English professional squash player. She reached a career high ranking of number 24 in the world during March 2025.

== Career ==
In March 2022, she won her first professional tournament at the age of 18 after defeating Marta Dominguez Fernandez 3–1 in the final of the Val de Reuil Normandie, a Challenger 5 level event.

In April 2022, she won the European Individual U19 tournament defeating Hannah Chukwu 3–0 in the final.

After a 5 month absence, she won her first Challenger 10 level event in Ipswich defeating Nour Heikal 3-0 in the final.

In her first appearance at the British National Championships in August 2024 she reached the quarter final stage losing to ultimate champion Georgina Kennedy.

In September 2024, Malliff won her 4th PSA title after securing victory in the Nash Cup during the 2024–25 PSA Squash Tour.

== PSA Challenger 5 Titles (2) ==
Outcome	Year	Tournament	Location	Opponent in the final	Score in the final
Winner	2022	Val de Reuil Normandie	France	(Spain) Marta Dominguez Fernandez	11–9, 11–8, 6–11, 11-5
Winner	2022	Swiss Open	Switzerland	(Spain) Marta Dominguez Fernandez	9-11, 14–12, 11–2, 4–11, 11-7

== PSA Challenger 10 Title (1) ==
Outcome	Year	Tournament	Location	Opponent in the final	Score in the final
Winner	2024	Ipswich Challenger Cup 2024	England	(Egypt) Nour Heikal	11–5, 11–8, 11-7

== PSA Copper Title (1) ==
Outcome	Year	Tournament	Location	Opponent in the final	Score in the final
Winner	2024	Nash Cup 2024	Canada	(England) Torrie Malik	9-11, 11–4, 12-14, 11-3, 11-8
