= Julianne Courtice =

English squash player (born 1991)

Personal information
- Born: 3 November 1991 (age 34) Gloucester, England

Sport
- Country: England
- Handedness: Right Handed
- Retired: Active
- Racquet used: Black Knight

Women's singles
- Highest ranking: No. 28 (October 2020)
Medal record
Representing England
World Team Championships
Bronze medal – third place	2022 Cairo	Team
- Updated on December 2018

Julianne Courtice (born 3 November 1991) is an English professional squash player. She reached a career high ranking of number 28 in the world during October 2020.

== Career ==
In 2022, she won a bronze at the 2022 Women's World Team Squash Championships.
