= Emilia Soini =

Finnish professional squash player (born 1995)

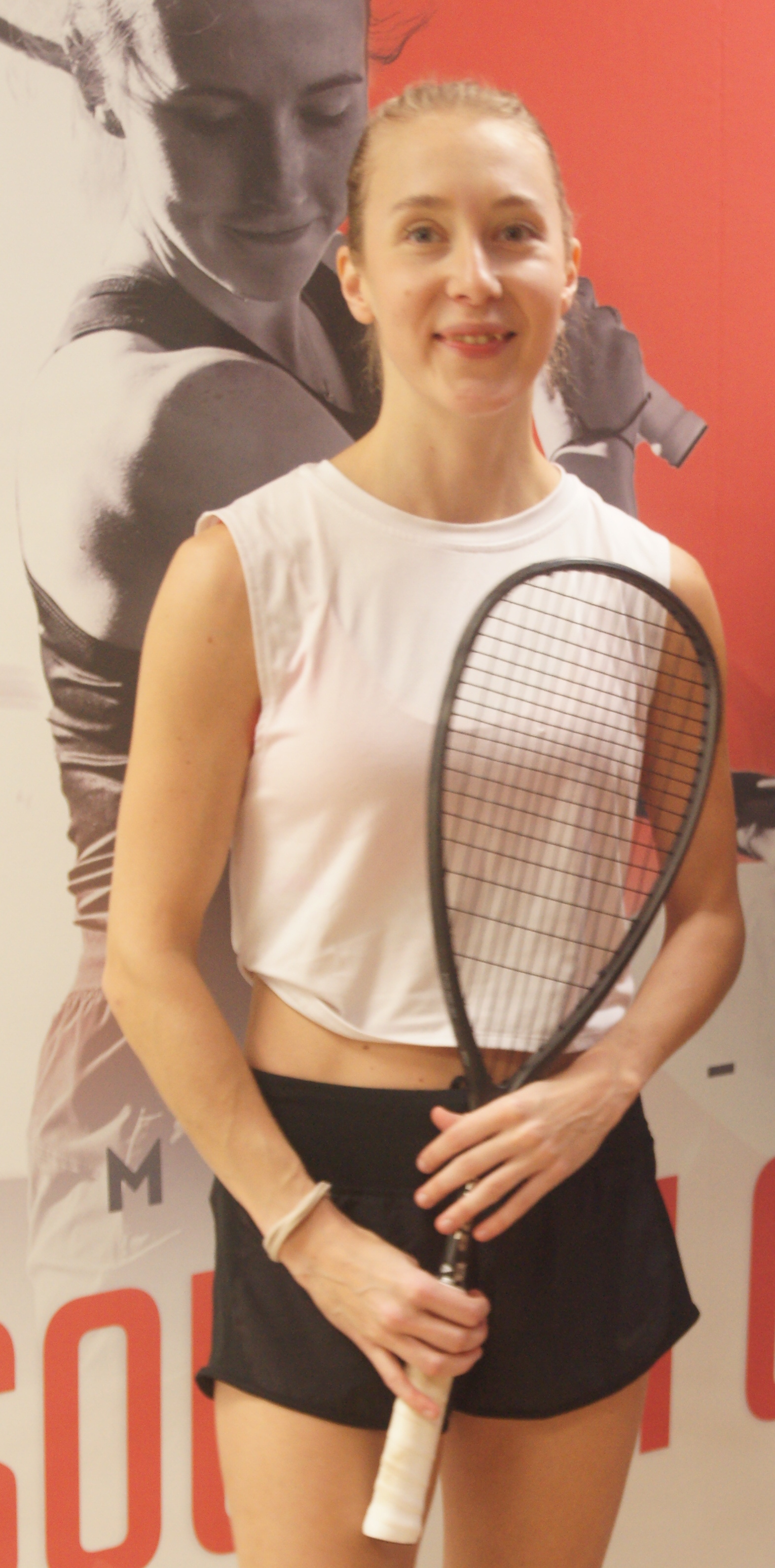
- Emilia Soini, Monte Carlo Squash Classic 2024

Personal information
- Nationality: Finnish
- Born: 16 October 1995 (age 30) Espoo, Finland

Sport
- Handedness: Right-handed
- Turned pro: 2012
- Coached by: Wael El Hindi
- Retired: Active
- Racquet used: Dunlop

Women's singles
- Highest ranking: No. 41 (May 2022)
- Current ranking: No. 91 (April 2026)
- Title: 1

Emilia Soini (born 16 October 1995) is a Finnish professional squash player. She reached a career high ranking of 41 in the world during May 2022.

== Biography ==
In March 2026, she won her first PSA title after securing victory in the Vello Squash Carnival during the 2025–26 PSA Squash Tour.
