= Ineta Hopton =

Latvian squash player (born 1992)

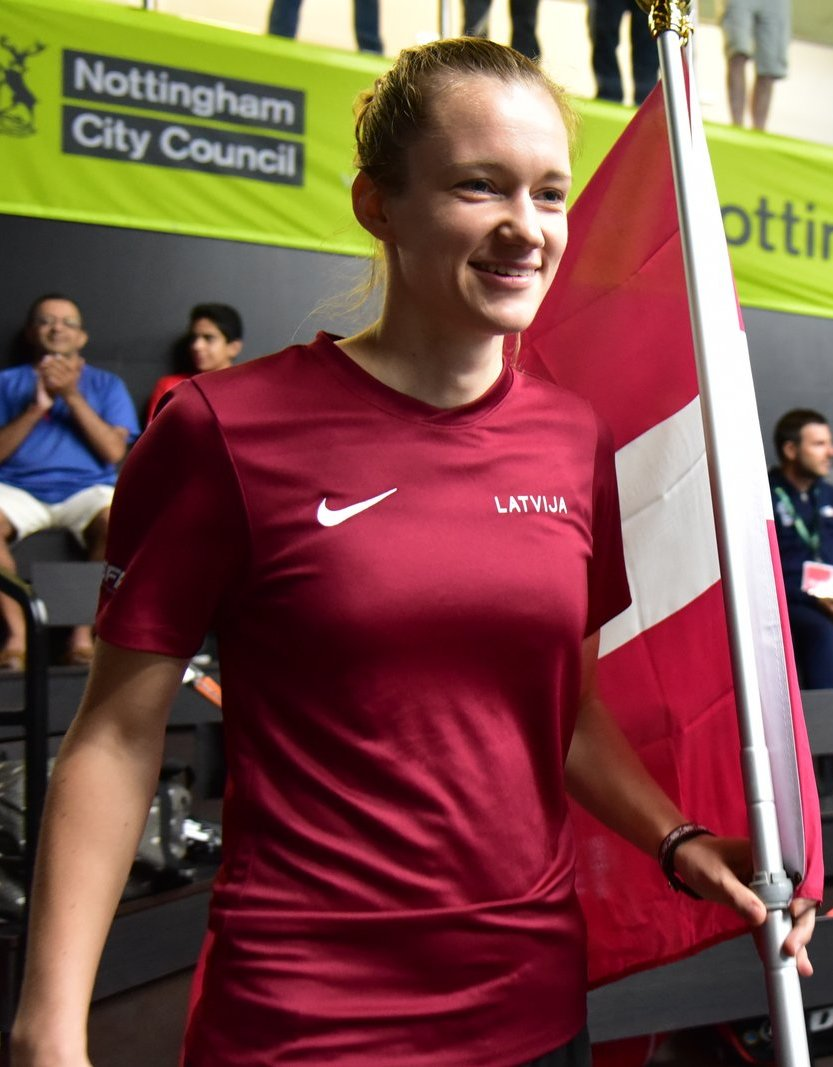
- Hopton in 2017

Personal information
- Born: Ineta Mackeviča; 11 July 1992 (age 34) Liepāja, Latvia
- Height: 183 cm (6 ft 0 in)
- Weight: 74 kg (163 lb)

Sport
- Country: Latvia
- Handedness: Right
- Coached by: Hendrik Voessing, Tobias Poll
- Retired: Active
- Racquet used: Dunlop

Women's singles
- Highest ranking: No. 42 (March 2022)
- Current ranking: No. 60 (September 2024)
- Title: 1
- Tour final: 4
- Updated on September 2024

Ineta Hopton (née Mackeviča; born 11 July 1992) is a Latvian professional squash player.

In March 2022, she reached number 42 in the world, her career-best ranking so far. She has reached four finals on the PSA World Tour and won one title. In June 2023 she married squash coach Will Hopton.
