= Fiona Moverley =

English squash player (born 1987)

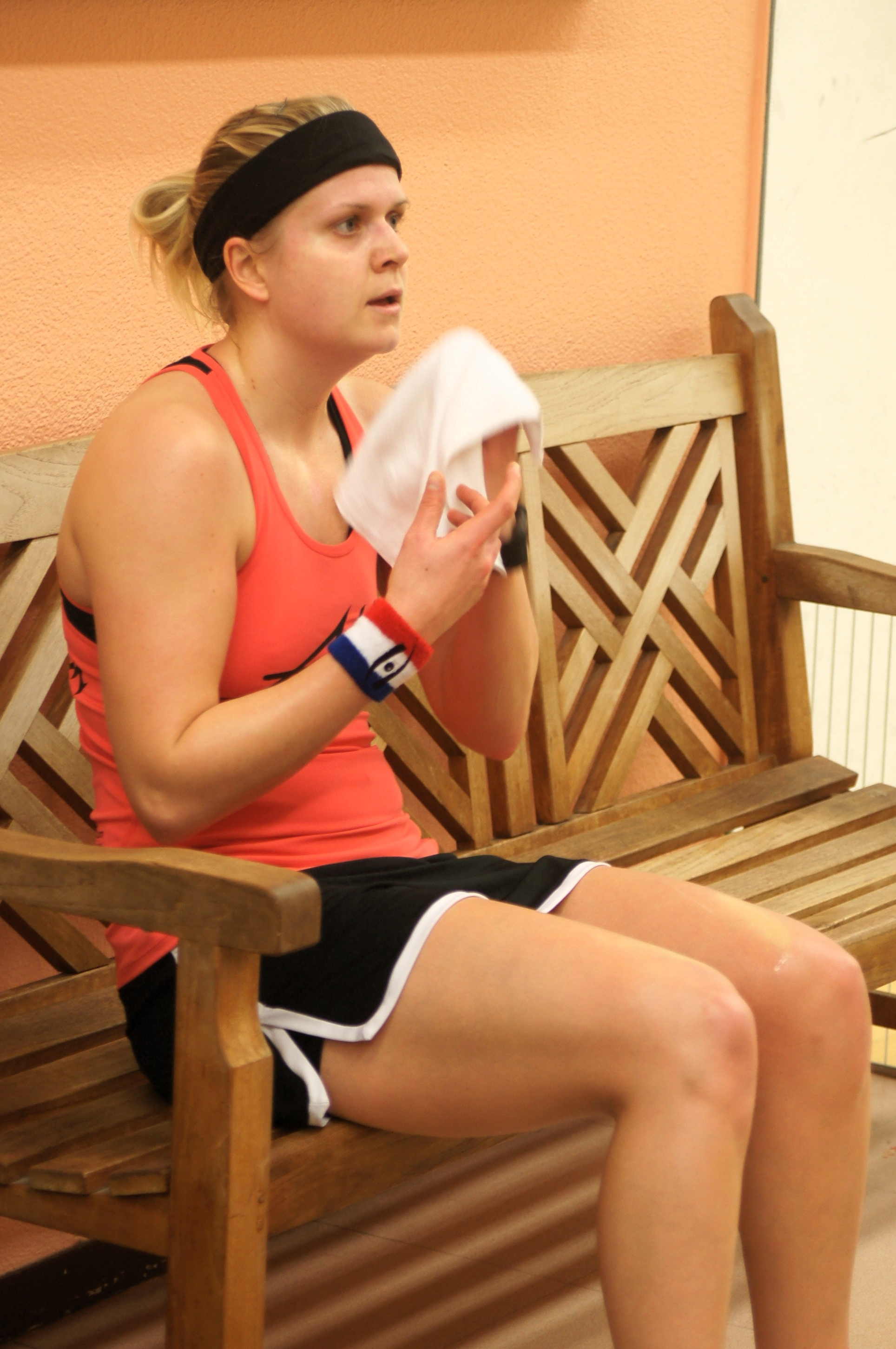
- Fiona Moverley, Monte-Carlo Squash classic 2016

Personal information
- Born: 25 January 1987 (age 39) Hull, England

Sport
- Country: England
- Handedness: Right Handed
- Turned pro: 2005
- Coached by: Andy Cockerill
- Retired: 2019
- Racquet used: Tecnifibre

Women's singles
- Highest ranking: No. 21 (January 2018)
Medal record
Women's squash
Representing England
European Team Championships
Gold medal – first place	2017 Helsinki	Team

Fiona Louise Moverley (born 25 January 1987) is an English former professional squash player. She also played under a married name of Fiona Scott at one time and reached a career-high world ranking of World No. 21 in January 2018.

== Biography ==
She represented England as a junior but was forced to retire aged 22 after struggling to finance her career. However she returned to compete in the senior ranks.

Moverley won a gold medal for the England women's national squash team at the 2017 European Squash Team Championships in Helsinki.

In 2018 she won the Open International de Squash de Nantes. The following year in 2019, Moverley started training as a fire fighter and retired from squash after the 2019 British Open.
