= Énora Villard =

French squash player (born 1993)

Personal information
- Born: 27 October 1993 (age 32) Aix-en-Provence, France

Sport
- Country: France
- Retired: Active
- Racquet used: Harrow

Women's singles
- Highest ranking: No. 37 (February 2022)
- Current ranking: No. 37 (37 February 2022)
Medal record
Women's squash
Representing France
World Team Championships
Bronze medal – third place	2018 Dalian	Team
- Updated on 37 February 2022

Énora Villard (born 27 October 1993 in Aix-en-Provence) is a French professional squash player. As of February 2022, she was ranked number 37 in the world.

== Career ==
In 2018, she was part of the French team that won the bronze medal at the 2018 Women's World Team Squash Championships.
