= Nouran Gohar =

Egyptian squash player (born 1997)

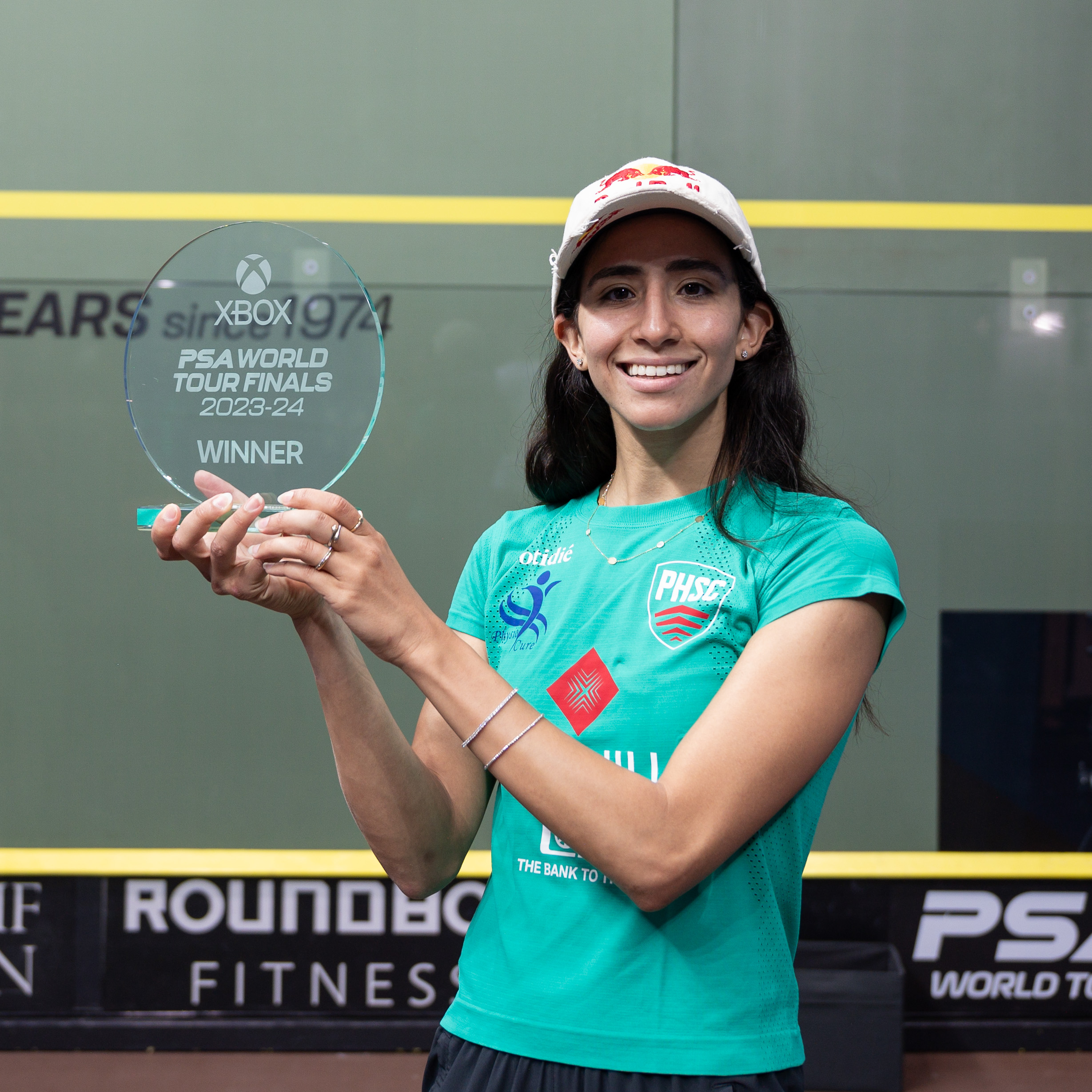
- Nouran Gohar in 2024

Personal information
- Born: 30 September 1997 (age 29) Egypt
- Years active: 16
- Height: 167 cm (5 ft 6 in)
- Weight: 59 kg (130 lb)
- Children: 1

Sport
- Country: Egypt
- Handedness: Right Handed
- Coached by: Omar Abd El Aziz, Karim Darwish
- Retired: Active
- Racquet used: Technifibre

Women's singles
- Highest ranking: No. 1 (October 2020)
- Current ranking: No. 23 (21 November 2026)
- Title: 34
- World Open: W (2023–24)
Medal record
Women's squash
Representing Egypt
World Championships
| Gold medal – first place | 2024 Cairo | Singles |
| Silver medal – second place | 2020–21 Chicago | Singles |
| Silver medal – second place | 2022 Cairo | Singles |
| Silver medal – second place | 2023 Chicago | Singles |
| Bronze medal – third place | 2015 Kuala Lumpur | Singles |
| Bronze medal – third place | 2016 El Gouna | Singles |
| Bronze medal – third place | 2019–20 Cairo | Singles |
| Bronze medal – third place | 2025 Chicago | Singles |
World Team Championships
| Gold medal – first place | 2016 Issy-les-Moulineaux | Team |
| Gold medal – first place | 2018 Dalian | Team |
| Gold medal – first place | 2022 Cairo | Team |

Nouran Ahmed Gohar (Arabic: نُورَان أَحْمَد جَوْهَر; born 30 September 1997) is a professional squash player who represents Egypt. She is the 2023–24 world champion and a three-times world team champion. She reached a career-high world ranking of No. 1 in July 2020.

== Career ==
Gohar lifted her first Tour title at the Prague Open in December 2013 at 16 years of age, where she played to her seeding to see off Lucie Fialová to triumph. Gohar earned another title the following year at the Irish Open before her victory over Omneya Abdel Kawy in the final of the Monte Carlo Classic elevated her into the world's top 20 for the first time. A quarter-final finish at the Texas Open in April 2015 ensured that Gohar would breach the top 15 in the world.

Gohar won the prestigious British Junior Open three times: in 2012, 2015, and 2016. She also was a two time World Junior Squash champion, winning consecutive titles in 2015 and 2016. In 2016, she was part of the Egyptian team that won the gold medal at the 2016 Women's World Team Squash Championships.

In 2018, she won her second world team title as part of the Egyptian team that won the 2018 Women's World Team Squash Championships.

In May 2019, Gohar defeated the French fourth seed Camille Serme in the final of the prestigious Women's British Open Squash Championship, which saw Gohar (seeded seventh) becoming the lowest seed to win the tournament in the modern era. On her way to the final, Gohar had beaten the number 1 and 3 seeds (Raneem El Weleily and Nour El Tayeb). This helped propel her toward the number 1 ranking in the world, which she achieved in July 2020.

In 2022, she was part of the Egyptian team that won the 2022 Women's World Team Squash Championships, her third world team title.

In May 2023, she reached the final of the 2023 PSA Women's World Squash Championship, defeating number 3 seed Hania El Hammamy in the semi final. However, in the final despite being the top seed she was defeated in straight sets by Nour El Sherbini. It was the third consecutive world final that Gohar had been beaten by El Sherbini.

Gohar finally won the elusive world individual title at the 2024 PSA Women's World Squash Championship, defeating rival and defending champion Nour El Sherbini in the final.

In April 2025, Gohar won her 32nd PSA title after securing victory in the El Gouna International during the 2024–25 PSA Squash Tour and then won a 33rd by winning the Grasshopper Cup. In May 2025, Gohar reached the semi-final of the 2025 Women's World Squash Championship in Chicago, but was defeated by Hania El Hammamy. but shortly afterwards made amends by winning the PSA Squash Tour Finals in Toronto, for the fourth time.

== Personal life ==
Gohar is married to fencer Ziad El-Sissy. On November 4, 2025, World No.1 at the time, Nouran Gohar, announced that she is pregnant with her first child. Making the announcement on social media with her husband Ziad Elsissy.

== Major World Series final appearances ==
=== British Open: 6 finals (2 title, 4 runner-up) ===
| Outcome | Year | Opponent in the final | Score in the final |
|---|---|---|---|
| Runner-up | 2016 | (Egypt) Nour El Sherbini | 7–11, 11–9, 11–7, 6–11, 8–11 |
| Winner | 2019 | (France) Camille Serme | 11–3, 11–8, 11–3 |
| Runner-up | 2021 | (Egypt) Nour El Sherbini | 9–11, 13–11, 5–11, 11–7, 11–2 |
| Runner-up | 2022 | (Egypt) Hania El Hammamy | 9–11, 7–11, 11–8, 4–11 |
| Runner-up | 2023 | (Egypt) Nour El Sherbini | 9–11, 7–11, 1–11 |
| Winner | 2024 | (Egypt) Nour El Sherbini | 11–6, 17–15, 3–11, 7–11, 11–4 |

=== Hong Kong Open: 1 final (1 title, 0 runner-up) ===
| Outcome | Year | Opponent in the final | Score in the final |
|---|---|---|---|
| Winner | 2016 | (United States) Amanda Sobhy | 6–11, 12–10, 11–7, 11–8 |

=== El Gouna International: 5 finals (2 title, 3 runner-up) ===
| Outcome | Year | Opponent in the final | Score in the final |
|---|---|---|---|
| Runner-up | 2019 | (Egypt) Raneem El Weleily | 8–11, 11–7, 10–12, 6–11 |
| Runner-up | 2021 | (Egypt) Nour El Sherbini | 7–11, 8–11, 5–11 |
| Runner-up | 2022 | (Egypt) Hania El Hammamy | 11–2, 11–4, 8–11, 9–11, 4–11 |
| Winner | 2023 | (Belgium) Nele Gilis | 11–5, 11–7, 11–9 |
| Winner | 2024 | (Egypt) Nour El Sherbini | 11–6, 11–13, 11–6, 11–6 |

=== United States Open: 3 finals (3 titles, 0 runner-up) ===
| Outcome | Year | Opponent in the final | Score in the final |
|---|---|---|---|
| Winner | 2019 | (Egypt) Nour El Tayeb | 3–11, 8–11, 14–12, 11–8, 11–7 |
| Winner | 2021 | (Egypt) Hania El Hammamy | 9–11, 11–9, 11–7, 11–3 |
| Winner | 2022 | (Egypt) Nour El Sherbini | 3–11, 11–7, 9–11, 11–7, 11–6 |

== See also ==
- Official Women's Squash World Ranking

Sporting positions
| Preceded by Raneem El Weleily | World No. 1 July 2020 – Present | Succeeded by Current Holder |
