= Milou van der Heijden =

Dutch squash player (born 1990)

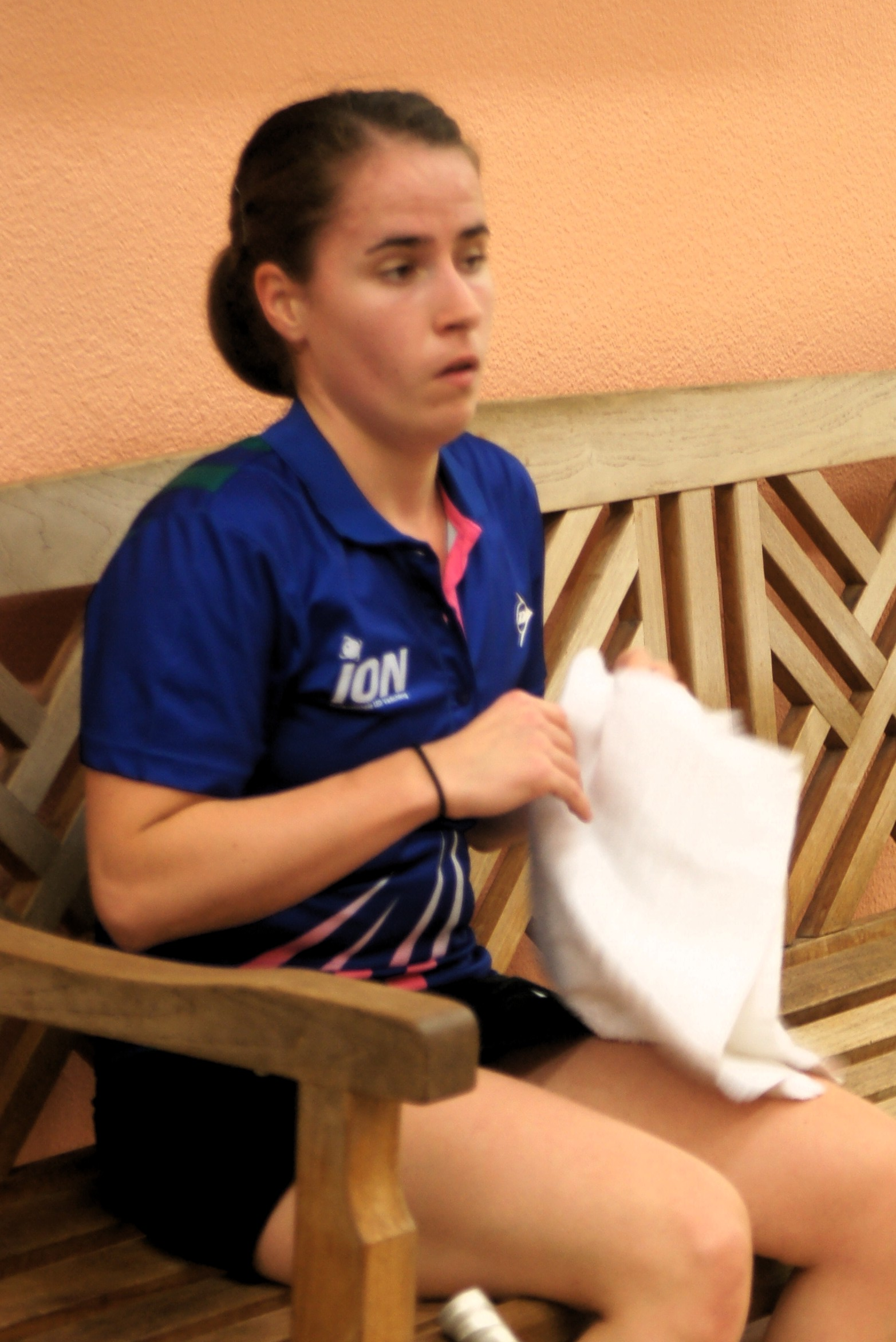
- Milou van der Heijden, Monte-Carlo Squash Classic 2016

Personal information
- Born: 18 December 1990 (age 35) Veldhoven, Netherlands

Sport
- Country: Netherlands
- Handedness: Right Handed
- Turned pro: 2007
- Coached by: Sjef van der Heijden
- Retired: 2022
- Racquet used: Dunlop

Women's singles
- Highest ranking: No. 29 (March 2019)
- Title: 10
- Tour final: 19
- Updated on June 2022

Milou van der Heijden (born 18 December 1990) is a Dutch retired professional squash player. She reached a career-high world ranking of World No. 29 in March 2019.

In June 2022, she announced her retirement from the PSA World Tour. The Netherlands No.1 won 10 PSA titles in her 15-year career.
