= Alexandra Fuller (squash player) =

South African squash player (born 1993)

Personal information
- Born: 24 August 1993 (age 32) Cape Town, South Africa

Sport
- Country: South Africa
- Handedness: Right-handed
- Turned pro: 2013
- Coached by: Paul Atkinson
- Racquet used: Head

Women's singles
- Highest ranking: No. 22 (October 2022)
- Title: 10

Alexandra Fuller (born 24 August 1993) is a South African professional squash player. She reached a career high ranking of 22 in the world during October 2022. She was a member of South Africa women's national squash team.

== Biography ==
Fuller won nine PSA titles before retiring in January 2024. However, she made a comeback in June 2025 and won the Western Province Open to claim her 10th career title during the 2024–25 PSA Squash Tour.
