= Yathreb Adel =

Egyptian squash player (born 1996)

Personal information
- Born: March 6, 1996 (age 30) Heliopolis, Egypt
- Height: 172 cm (5 ft 8 in)

Sport
- Country: Egypt
- Handedness: Right Handed
- Coached by: Islam Adel
- Retired: 2024
- Racquet used: Head

Women's singles
- Highest ranking: No. 13 (July 2020)
- Title: 9
- Tour final: 14
- Updated on October 2024

Yathreb Adel (born 6 March 1996 in Cairo) is a retired Egyptian professional squash player who represented Egypt internationally. She reached a career-high world ranking of World No.13 in July 2020.

In March 2018, Adel, then World No.42, defeated Hong Kong's World No.19 Joey Chan – in straight-games in 35 minutes – to lift the Wasatch Advisors Salt Lake City Open PSA W15 title in Utah, United States. She announced her retirement in October 2024.
