= Zeina Mickawy =

Egyptian squash player (born 1998)

Personal information
- Born: October 17, 1998 (age 27) Alexandria, Egypt

Sport
- Country: Egypt
- Handedness: Right Handed
- Turned pro: 2012
- Retired: Active
- Racquet used: Head

Women's singles
- Highest ranking: No. 20 (August 2019)
- Current ranking: No. 28 (14 July 2025)

Zeina Mickawy (born 17 October 1998) is an Egyptian professional squash player. She reached a career high ranking of number 20 in the world during August 2019.

In March 2025, Mickawy won her third PSA title after securing victory in the Spanish Open during the 2024–25 PSA Squash Tour.
