= Tesni Murphy =

Welsh squash player

Tesni Murphy (née Evans)
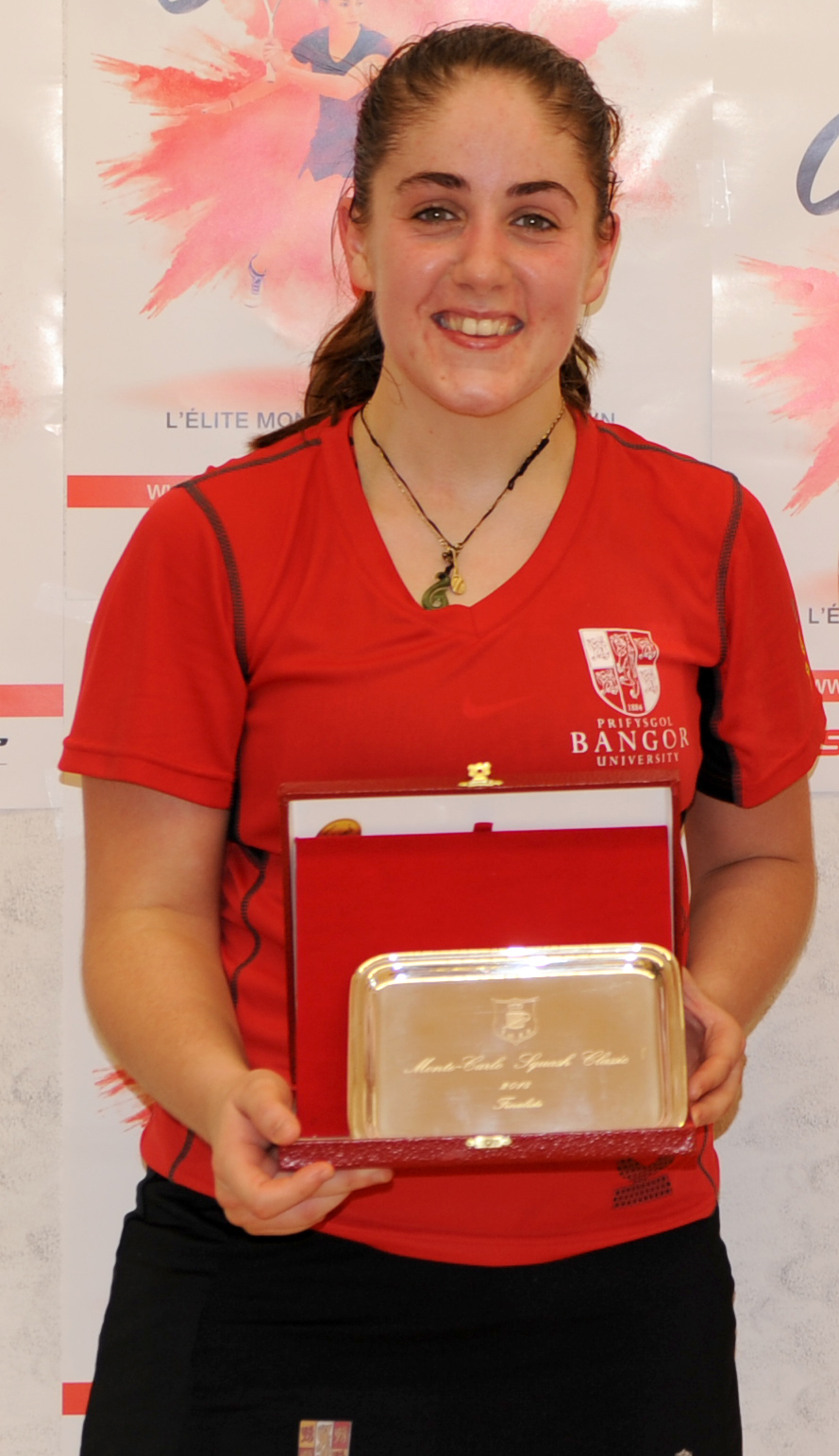
- Tesni Murphy, Monte Carlo Squash Classic 2018

Personal information
- Born: 15 October 1992 (age 33) Cardiff, Wales
- Height: 5 ft 2 in (157 cm)
- Weight: 63 kg (139 lb)

Sport
- Country: Wales
- Handedness: Right Handed
- Turned pro: 2010
- Coached by: Andrew Evans and David Evans
- Retired: Active
- Racquet used: Karakal

Women's singles, Mixed Doubles
- Highest ranking: No. 9 (November 2018)
- Current ranking: No. 21 (14 July 2025)
- Title: 3
Medal record
Women's squash
Representing Wales
World Doubles Championships
Bronze medal – third place	2017 Manchester	Mixed doubles
Commonwealth Games
Bronze medal – third place	2018 Gold Coast	Singles
European Team Championships
Bronze medal – third place	2017 Helsinki	Team
Silver medal – second place	2022 Eindhoven	Team
Bronze medal – third place	2023 Helsinki	Team
Bronze medal – third place	2024 Uster	Team
British Championships
Gold medal – first place	2018–19, 2025	singles
Welsh Championships
Gold medal – first place	2011, 2013, 2015–21, 2024–25	singles

Tesni Murphy (née Evans; born 15 October 1992) is a professional squash player who represents Wales and is a record ten-time Welsh national squash champion. She reached a career-high PSA ranking of World No.9 in November 2018, becoming the highest-ranked Welsh woman of all time and the first to break into the Top 10. Murphy has represented Team Wales in the 2014 Commonwealth Games, the 2018 Commonwealth Games and in the WSF World Team Championships.

== Biography ==
Born in Cardiff as Tesni Evans but living in Rhyl, she represented the Welsh team at the 2014 Commonwealth Games in Glasgow, Scotland in the women's singles, the women's doubles and mixed doubles. Partnering Deon Saffery the pair reached the quarter-finals in the doubles.

Evans became the first Welsh player to land the prestigious British National Championship, when in 2018, she beat Alison Waters 11–5, 11–9, 11–7 in the final in Manchester. Murphy is the first Welsh player to lift the title (male or female). Murphy retained the British National title, becoming a two-time champion, the following year in 2019, when she defeated England's Emily Whitlock 3-0 (11-3, 11–6, 11–5) in the final, which was contested in Nottingham.

Evans competed at the 2018 Commonwealth Games, her second consecutive Commonwealth Games appearance, and claimed her maiden Commonwealth Games medal after stunning defending Commonwealth Games champion Nicol David of Malaysia in the bronze medal match of the women's singles event. This medal was also the first Commonwealth Games medal earned by Wales in squash events after 20 years since the 1998 Commonwealth Games. She married Ben Murphy and played under her married name thereafter.

In 2024, Murphy won her 2nd PSA title after securing victory in the Monte Carlo Squash Classic during the 2024–25 PSA Squash Tour. In May 2025, Murphy won the Irish Open (her 3rd PSA title).

In 2025, Murphy won her third British National Squash Championships title, defeating Torrie Malik in the final.
