= 2020–21 PSA Women's World Squash Championship =

2020–21 Women's World Championship
- 36th PSA Women's World Squash Championship
- Location: Chicago, United States
- Venue: University Club of Chicago
- Date: 14–22 July 2021
- Website https://worldsquashchamps.com/
- Category: PSA World Championships
- Prize money: $500,000

Results
- Champion: (Egypt) Nour El Sherbini
- Runner-up: (Egypt) Nouran Gohar
- Semi-finalists: (France) Camille Serme (United States) Amanda Sobhy

The 2020–21 PSA Women's World Squash Championship was the 2020–21 women's edition of the World Squash Championships, which serves as the individual world championship for squash players. The event took place in Chicago, United States from 14 to 22 July 2021. It's the second time that Chicago hosted the PSA World Championships after 2018–19 edition.

== World Ranking Points/Prize money ==
PSA also awards points towards World Ranking. Points are awarded as follows:

PSA World Squash Championships		Ranking Points						
Rank	Prize money US$	Winner	Runner up	3/4	5/8	9/16	17/32	33/64
World Squash Championships	$500,000	3175	2090	1270	780	475	290	177.5

=== Prize money breakdown ===
Total prize money for the tournament is $1,000,000, $500,000 per gender. This is a 7,65% prize fund increase from previous World Championships (2019–20, $335,000 Men's/$430,000 Women's) that were held separately.

Position (num. of players)		% breakdown	Prize money (Total: $500,000)
Winner	(1)	16%	$80,000
Runner-up	(1)	10%	$50,000
3/4	(2)	6%	$30,000
5/8	(4)	3.50%	$17,500
9/16	(8)	2%	$10,000
17/32	(16)	1%	$5,000
33/64	(32)	0.50%	$2,500

== Seeds ==
Click on the seed number of a player to go to their draw section.

1. (Egypt) Nour El Sherbini (champion)
2. (Egypt) Nouran Gohar (runner-up)
3. (France) Camille Serme (semifinals)
4. (Egypt) Hania El Hammamy (quarterfinals)
5. (United States) Amanda Sobhy (semifinals)
6. (England) Sarah-Jane Perry (quarterfinals)
7. (New Zealand) Joelle King (quarterfinals)
8. (Egypt) Salma Hany (quarterfinals)

9. (Wales) Tesni Evans (third round)
10. (India) Joshna Chinappa (third round)
11. (Egypt) Rowan Elaraby (third round)
12. (United States) Olivia Clyne (third round)
13. (Belgium) Nele Gilis (third round)
14. (Belgium) Tinne Gilis (second round)
15. (Egypt) Nadine Shahin (third round)
16. (Canada) Hollie Naughton (third round)

== Draw and results ==
=== Finals ===
Semi finals
1	(Egypt) Nour El Sherbini	11	11	11
5	(United States) Amanda Sobhy	3	5	5
3	(France) Camille Serme	8	4	3
2	(Egypt) Nouran Gohar	11	11	11

Final
1	(Egypt) Nour El Sherbini	11	11	8	11
2	(Egypt) Nouran Gohar	5	8	11	9

2020–21 Men's PSA World Squash Championship winner
(Egypt)
Nour El Sherbini
Fifth title

=== Top half ===
==== Section 1 ====
First round
1	(Egypt) Nour El Sherbini	11	11	11
(United States) Haley Mendez	3	7	8
(Finland) Emilia Soini	11	11	11	11
(Egypt) Mayar Hany	13	6	6	7
(United States) Olivia Fiechter	11	11	11
(France) Énora Villard	6	1	2
(Egypt) Menna Hamed	10	12	3	7
14	(Belgium) Tinne Gilis	12	10	11	11
10	(India) Joshna Chinappa	11	11	11
(Netherlands) Tessa ter Sluis	6	4	6
(Italy) Bruna Marchesi	1	3	2
(France) Mélissa Alves	11	11	11
(France) Coline Aumard	11	11	11
(Hong Kong) Liu Tsz Ling	7	6	5
(Hong Kong) Vanessa Chu	11	4	9	5
6	(England) Sarah-Jane Perry	7	11	11	11

Second round
1	(Egypt) Nour El Sherbini	11	11	11
(Finland) Emilia Soini	3	5	8
(United States) Olivia Fiechter	9	11	11	13
14	(Belgium) Tinne Gilis	11	8	9	11
10	(India) Joshna Chinappa	11	11	16
(France) Mélissa Alves	5	5	14
(France) Coline Aumard	6	3	7
6	(England) Sarah-Jane Perry	11	11	11

Third Round
1	(Egypt) Nour El Sherbini	11	14	11
(United States) Olivia Fiechter	4	12	7
10	(India) Joshna Chinappa	11	6	7	7
6	(England) Sarah-Jane Perry	9	11	11	11

Quarter finals
1	(Egypt) Nour El Sherbini	11	12	11
6	(England) Sarah-Jane Perry	6	10	2

==== Section 2 ====
First round
5	(United States) Amanda Sobhy	11	11	11
(England) Jasmine Hutton	8	3	1
(Hong Kong) Tong Tsz Wing	5	7	6
(Egypt) Nada Abbas	11	11	11
(Canada) Danielle Letourneau	11	12	11
(United States) Marina Stefanoni	4	10	5
(Spain) Cristina Gómez	10	9	8
16	(Canada) Hollie Naughton	12	11	11
13	(Belgium) Nele Gilis	11	11	11
(Canada) Nicole Bunyan	3	2	4
(Egypt) Sana Ibrahim	9	2	8
(Malaysia) Sivasangari Subramaniam	11	11	11
(Netherlands) Milou van der Heijden	11	6	4	8
(Hong Kong) Ho Tze-Lok	9	11	11	11
(Serbia) Jelena Dutina	3	1	3
4	(Egypt) Hania El Hammamy	11	11	11

Second round
5	(United States) Amanda Sobhy	11	11	11
(Egypt) Nada Abbas	9	5	5
(Canada) Danielle Letourneau	11	4	11	3	4
16	(Canada) Hollie Naughton	7	11	8	11	11
13	(Belgium) Nele Gilis	11	12	3	13
(Malaysia) Sivasangari Subramaniam	6	10	11	11
(Hong Kong) Ho Tze-Lok	5	2	6
4	(Egypt) Hania El Hammamy	11	11	11

Third Round
5	(United States) Amanda Sobhy	11	11	8	11
16	(Canada) Hollie Naughton	5	8	11	5
13	(Belgium) Nele Gilis	9	12	9
4	(Egypt) Hania El Hammamy	11	14	11

Quarter finals
5	(United States) Amanda Sobhy	11	11	11
4	(Egypt) Hania El Hammamy	3	8	9

=== Bottom half ===
==== Section 3 ====
First round
3	(France) Camille Serme	11	11	11
(Hong Kong) Lee Ka Yi	7	1	4
(England) Lily Taylor	11	6	4	6
(Australia) Donna Lobban	9	11	11	11
(Malaysia) Low Wee Wern	11	11	11
(Switzerland) Nadia Pfister	2	4	2
(Switzerland) Cindy Merlo	3	6	5
12	(United States) Olivia Clyne	11	11	11
11	(Egypt) Rowan Elaraby	11	11	11
(Scotland) Georgia Adderley	4	5	6
(Wales) Ali Loke	5	3	2
(United States) Sabrina Sobhy	11	11	11
(Egypt) Zeina Mickawy	11	11	5	11
(France) Marie Stephan	3	6	11	3
(Latvia) Ineta Mackeviča	3	3	9
8	(Egypt) Salma Hany	11	11	11

Second round
3	(France) Camille Serme	11	11	11
(Australia) Donna Lobban	9	3	3
(Malaysia) Low Wee Wern	9	11	9	8
12	(United States) Olivia Clyne	11	4	11	11
11	(Egypt) Rowan Elaraby	10	11	11	11
(United States) Sabrina Sobhy	12	8	8	7
(Egypt) Zeina Mickawy	8	6	13	5
8	(Egypt) Salma Hany	11	11	11	11

Third Round
3	(France) Camille Serme	11	11	9	11
12	(United States) Olivia Clyne	8	7	11	8
11	(Egypt) Rowan Elaraby	11	4	4	6
8	(Egypt) Salma Hany	8	11	11	11

Quarter finals
3	(France) Camille Serme	11	11	11
8	(Egypt) Salma Hany	8	7	7

==== Section 4 ====
First round
7	(New Zealand) Joelle King	11	11	11
(Poland) Karina Tyma	3	2	2
(United States) Lucie Stefanoni	2	1	6
(Wales) Emily Whitlock	11	11	11
(Egypt) Farida Mohamed	8	8	13	9
(Malaysia) Rachel Arnold	11	11	11	11
(Egypt) Menna Nasser	4	7	6
15	(Egypt) Nadine Shahin	11	11	11
9	(Wales) Tesni Evans	11	11	11
(Canada) Nikki Todd	3	8	3
(Czech Republic) Anna Serme	4	6	4
(England) Lucy Turmel	11	11	11
(Scotland) Lisa Aitken	11	7	11	11
(Egypt) Hana Moataz	8	11	9	5
(England) Lucy Beecroft	6	1	5
2	(Egypt) Nouran Gohar	11	11	11

Second round
7	(New Zealand) Joelle King	11	11	8	11
(Wales) Emily Whitlock	7	7	11	9
(Malaysia) Rachel Arnold	14	11	7	4
15	(Egypt) Nadine Shahin	12	13	11	11
9	(Wales) Tesni Evans	9	11	11	3	11
(England) Lucy Turmel	11	8	3	11	7
(Scotland) Lisa Aitken	3	4	5
2	(Egypt) Nouran Gohar	11	11	11

Third Round
7	(New Zealand) Joelle King	11	11	11
15	(Egypt) Nadine Shahin	8	3	5
9	(Wales) Tesni Evans	10	4	8
2	(Egypt) Nouran Gohar	12	11	11

Quarter finals
7	(New Zealand) Joelle King	5	7	11	7
2	(Egypt) Nouran Gohar	11	11	8	11

== Schedule ==
Times are Central Daylight Time (UTC−05:00). To the best of five games.

=== Round 1 ===
Wednesday, 14 July

Date	Court	Time	Player 1	Player 2	Score
14 July	Glass Court	11:30	Jelena Dutina (SRB)	Hania El Hammamy (EGY)	3–11, 1–11, 3–11
14 July	Court 1	11:30	Joshna Chinappa (IND)	Tessa ter Sluis (NED)	11–6, 11–4, 11–6
14 July	Court 2	11:30	Coline Aumard (FRA)	Liu Tsz Ling (HKG)	11–7, 11–6, 11–5
14 July	Court 3	11:30	Milou van der Heijden (NED)	Ho Tze-Lok (HKG)	11–9, 6–11, 4–11, 8–11
14 July	Glass Court	13:30	Olivia Fiechter (USA)	Énora Villard (FRA)	11–6, 11–1, 11–2
14 July	Court 1	13:30	Bruna Marchesi (ITA)	Mélissa Alvès (FRA)	1–11, 3–11, 2–11
14 July	Court 2	13:30	Vanessa Chu (HKG)	Sarah-Jane Perry (ENG)	11–7, 4–11, 9–11, 5–11
14 July	Court 3	13:30	Menna Hamed (EGY)	Tinne Gilis (BEL)	10–12, 12–10, 3–11, 7–11
14 July	Court 1	15:30	Danielle Letourneau (CAN)	Marina Stefanoni (USA)	11–4, 12–10, 11–5
14 July	Court 2	15:30	Nele Gilis (BEL)	Nicole Bunyan (CAN)	11–3, 11–2, 11–4
14 July	Court 3	15:30	Emilia Soini (FIN)	Mayar Hany (EGY)	11–13, 11–6, 11–6, 11–7
14 July	Glass Court	17:00	Nour El Sherbini (EGY)	Haley Mendez (USA)	11–3, 11–7, 11–6
14 July	Court 1	17:30	Cristina Gómez (ESP)	Hollie Naughton (CAN)	10–12, 9–11, 8–11
14 July	Court 2	17:30	Sana Ibrahim (EGY)	Sivasangari Subramaniam (MYS)	9–11, 2–11, 8–11
14 July	Court 3	17:30	Tong Tsz Wing (HKG)	Nada Abbas (EGY)	5–11, 7–11, 6–11
14 July	Glass Court	19:00	Amanda Sobhy (USA)	Jasmine Hutton (ENG)	11-8, 11-1, 11-3

——————————————————————————————————————————————————————————————————————————————————————————————————————————

Thursday, 15 July

Date	Court	Time	Player 1	Player 2	Score
15 July	Glass Court	11:30	Camille Serme (FRA)	Lee Ka Yi (HKG)	11–7, 11–1, 11–4
15 July	Court 1	11:30	Zeina Mickawy (EGY)	Marie Stephan (FRA)	11–3, 11–6, 5–11, 11–3
15 July	Court 2	11:30	Lucie Stefanoni (USA)	Emily Whitlock (WAL)	2–11, 1–11, 6–11
15 July	Court 3	11:30	Lily Taylor (ENG)	Donna Lobban (AUS)	11–9, 6–11, 4–11, 6–11
15 July	Glass Court	13:30	Cindy Merlo (SUI)	Olivia Clyne (USA)	3–11, 6–11, 5–11
15 July	Court 1	13:30	Ineta Mackeviča (LAT)	Salma Hany (EGY)	3–11, 3–11, 9–11
15 July	Court 2	13:30	Joelle King (NZL)	Karina Tyma (POL)	11–3, 11–2, 11–2
15 July	Court 3	13:30	Low Wee Wern (MYS)	Nadia Pfister (SUI)	11–2, 11–4, 11–2
15 July	Court 1	15:30	Farida Mohamed (EGY)	Rachel Arnold (MYS)	8–11, 8–11, 13–11, 9–11
15 July	Court 2	15:30	Tesni Evans (WAL)	Nikki Todd (CAN)	11–3, 11–8, 11–3
15 July	Court 3	15:30	Lisa Aitken (SCO)	Hana Moataz (EGY)	11–8, 7–11, 11–9, 11–5
15 July	Glass Court	17:00	Lucy Beecroft (ENG)	Nouran Gohar (EGY)	6–11, 1–11, 5–11
15 July	Court 1	17:30	Menna Nasser (EGY)	Nadine Shahin (EGY)	4–11, 7–11, 6–11
15 July	Court 2	17:30	Anna Serme (CZE)	Lucy Turmel (ENG)	4–11, 6–11, 4–11
15 July	Court 3	17:30	Rowan Elaraby (EGY)	Georgia Adderley (SCO)	11–4, 11–5, 11–6
15 July	Glass Court	19:00	Ali Loke (WAL)	Sabrina Sobhy (USA)	5–11, 3–11, 2–11

=== Round 2 ===
Friday, 16 July

Date	Court	Time	Player 1	Player 2	Score
16 July	Glass Court	11:30	Camille Serme (FRA)	Donna Lobban (AUS)	11–9, 11–3, 11–3
16 July	Court 1	11:30	Joshna Chinappa (IND)	Mélissa Alvès (FRA)	11–5, 11–5, 16–14
16 July	Court 2	11:30	Coline Aumard (FRA)	Sarah-Jane Perry (ENG)	6–11, 3–11, 7–11
16 July	Court 3	11:30	Low Wee Wern (MYS)	Olivia Clyne (USA)	9–11, 11–4, 9–11, 8–11
16 July	Glass Court	13:30	Lisa Aitken (SCO)	Nouran Gohar (EGY)	3–11, 4–11, 5–11
16 July	Court 1	13:30	Zeina Mickawy (EGY)	Salma Hany (EGY)	8–11, 6–11, 13–11, 5–11
16 July	Court 2	13:30	Tesni Evans (WAL)	Lucy Turmel (ENG)	9–11, 11–8, 11–3, 3–11, 11–7
16 July	Court 3	13:30	Ho Tze-Lok (HKG)	Hania El Hammamy (EGY)	5–11, 2–11, 6–11
16 July	Court 1	15:30	Rachel Arnold (MYS)	Nadine Shahin (EGY)	14–12, 11–13, 4–11, 7–11
16 July	Court 2	15:30	Nele Gilis (BEL)	Sivasangari Subramaniam (MYS)	11–6, 12–10, 3–11, 13–11
16 July	Court 3	15:30	Olivia Fiechter (USA)	Tinne Gilis (BEL)	9–11, 11–8, 11–9, 13–11
16 July	Glass Court	17:00	Nour El Sherbini (EGY)	Emilia Soini (FIN)	11–3, 11–5, 11–8
16 July	Court 1	17:30	Danielle Letourneau (CAN)	Hollie Naughton (CAN)	11–7, 4–11, 11–8, 3–11, 4–11
16 July	Court 2	17:30	Joelle King (NZL)	Emily Whitlock (WAL)	11–7, 11–7, 8–11, 11–9
16 July	Court 3	17:30	Rowan Elaraby (EGY)	Sabrina Sobhy (USA)	10–12, 11–8, 11–8, 11–7
16 July	Glass Court	19:00	Amanda Sobhy (USA)	Nada Abbas (EGY)	11–9, 11–5, 11–5

=== Round 3 ===
Saturday, 17 & Sunday 18 July

Date	Court	Time	Player 1	Player 2	Score
17 July	Glass Court	11:30	Joshna Chinappa (IND)	Sarah-Jane Perry (ENG)	11–9, 6–11, 7–11, 7–11
17 July	Glass Court	13:30	Nele Gilis (BEL)	Hania El Hammamy (EGY)	9–11, 12–14, 9–11
17 July	Glass Court	17:00	Nour El Sherbini (EGY)	Olivia Fiechter (USA)	11–4, 14–12, 11–7
17 July	Glass Court	19:15	Amanda Sobhy (USA)	Hollie Naughton (CAN)	11–5, 11–8, 8–11, 11–5
18 July	Glass Court	11:30	Rowan Elaraby (EGY)	Salma Hany (EGY)	11–8, 4–11, 4–11, 6–11
18 July	Glass Court	13:30	Joelle King (NZL)	Nadine Shahin (EGY)	11–8, 11–3, 11–5
18 July	Glass Court	17:00	Camille Serme (FRA)	Olivia Clyne (USA)	11–8, 11–7, 9–11, 11–8
18 July	Glass Court	19:15	Tesni Evans (WAL)	Nouran Gohar (EGY)	10–12, 4–11, 8–11

=== Quarter-finals ===
Monday, 19 & Tuesday 20 July

Date	Court	Time	Player 1	Player 2	Score
19 July	Glass Court	17:00	Nour El Sherbini (EGY)	Sarah-Jane Perry (ENG)	11–6, 12–10, 11-2
19 July	Glass Court	19:15	Amanda Sobhy (USA)	Hania El Hammamy (EGY)	11–3, 11–8, 11–9
20 July	Glass Court	17:00	Camille Serme (FRA)	Salma Hany (EGY)	11–8, 11–7, 11–7
20 July	Glass Court	19:15	Joelle King (NZL)	Nouran Gohar (EGY)	5–11, 7–11, 11–8, 7–11

=== Semi-finals ===
Wednesday, 21 July

Date	Court	Time	Player 1	Player 2	Score
21 July	Glass Court	17:00	Nour El Sherbini (EGY)	Amanda Sobhy (USA)	11–3, 11–5, 11–5
21 July	Glass Court	19:00	Camille Serme (FRA)	Nouran Gohar (EGY)	8–11, 4–11, 3–11

=== Final ===
Thursday, 22 July

Date	Court	Time	Player 1	Player 2	Score
22 July	Glass Court	18:00	Nour El Sherbini (EGY)	Nouran Gohar (EGY)	11–5, 11–8, 8–11, 11–9

== Representation ==
This table shows the number of players by country in the 2020–21 PSA Women's World Championship. A total of 21 nationalities are represented. Egypt is the most numerous nation with 14 players.

	(Egypt) EGY	(United States) USA	(England) ENG	(France) FRA	(Hong Kong) HKG	(Canada) CAN	(Malaysia) MAS	(Wales) WAL	(Belgium) BEL	(Netherlands) NED	(Scotland) SCO	(Switzerland) SUI	(Australia) AUS	(Czech Republic) CZE	(Finland) FIN	(India) IND	(Italy) ITA	(New Zealand) NZL	(Latvia) LAT	(Poland) POL	(Serbia) SRB	(Spain) ESP	Total
Final	2	0	0	0	0	0	0	0	0	0	0	0	0	0	0	0	0	0	0	0	0	0	2
Semi-final	2	1	0	1	0	0	0	0	0	0	0	0	0	0	0	0	0	0	0	0	0	0	4
Quarter-final	4	1	1	1	0	0	0	0	0	0	0	0	0	0	0	0	0	1	0	0	0	0	8
Round 3	6	3	1	1	0	1	0	1	1	0	0	0	0	0	0	1	0	1	0	0	0	0	16
Round 2	8	4	2	3	1	2	3	2	2	0	1	0	1	0	1	1	0	1	0	0	0	0	32
Total	14	7	5	5	5	4	3	3	2	2	2	2	1	1	1	1	1	1	1	1	1	1	64

== See also ==
- World Squash Championships
- 2020–21 PSA Men's World Squash Championship

Preceded by Doha (Qatar); 2019–20	PSA World Championships; Chicago (USA); 2020–21	Succeeded by Cairo (Egypt); 2022
