= 2021 Women's Egyptian Squash Open =

Egyptian Squash Open
- Women's Egyptian Open

Details
- Event name: 2021 CIB Egyptian Open
- Location: Cairo, Egypt
- Venue: New Giza Sporting Club and Giza pyramid complex
- Dates: 10-17 September 2021
- Website cibegyptiansquashopen.net

Men's Winner
- Prize money: $295,000
- Year: 2021–22 PSA World Tour

The Women's 2021 CIB Egyptian Open is the women's edition of the 2021 CIB Egyptian Open, which is a 2021–22 PSA World Tour event. The event will take place in Cairo, Egypt between 10 and 17 September, 2021. The event's main sponsor is the Commercial International Bank of Egypt.

Nouran Gohar beat Nour El Sherbini in an all Egyptian final, being the first time Gohar has won this tournament.

== Seeds ==
1. (Egypt) Nour El Sherbini (runner-up)
2. (Egypt) Nouran Gohar (champion)
3. (Egypt) Camille Serme (semi-finals)
4. (New Zealand) Amanda Sobhy (semi-finals)
5. (Egypt) Sarah-Jane Perry (second round)
6. (Egypt) Hania El Hammamy (quarter-finals)
7. (Egypt) Salma Hany (quarter-finals)
8. (Egypt) Rowan Elaraby (quarter-finals)

== Draw and results ==
=== Semi-finals and final ===
Semi-finals
1	(Egypt) Nour El Sherbini	11	8	11	8
3	(France) Camille Serme	2	11	1	9^{r}
4	(United States) Amanda Sobhy	9	2	7
2	(Egypt) Nouran Gohar	11	11	11

Final
1	(Egypt) Nour El Sherbini	7	4	11	11	10
2	(Egypt) Nouran Gohar	11	11	5	7	12

=== Main Draw ===
==== Top half ====
First round
1	(Egypt) Nour El Sherbini
[Bye]
(Egypt) Menna Hamed	9	12	4
(Wales) Emily Whitlock	11	14	11
(Canada) Danielle Letourneau
[Bye]
(Egypt) Fayrouz Aboelkheir	8	5	3
(South Africa) Alexandra Fuller	11	11	11
(Egypt) Mayar Hany	11	6	11	9	5
(Switzerland) Cindy Merlo	4	11	7	11	11
(Hong Kong) Vanessa Chu	9	6	5
(England) Lucy Turmel	11	11	11
(Egypt) Farida Mohamed	11	11	11
(Czech Republic) Anna Serme	9	6	7
5	(England) Sarah-Jane Perry
[Bye]
8	(Egypt) Rowan Elaraby
[Bye]
(United States) Olivia Fiechter
[Bye]
(Hong Kong) Liu Tsz-Ling	11	11	6	1	11
(Latvia) Ineta Mackevica	5	9	11	11	6
(Hong Kong) Lee Ka Yi	11	6	6	5
(England) Jasmine Hutton	7	11	11	11
(Scotland) Lisa Aitken	8	11	11	5	11
(Egypt) Sana Ibrahim	11	7	6	11	0
(Egypt) Hana Ramadan	11	11	9	17
(Egypt) Zeina Mickawy	9	7	11	15
(Egypt) Yathreb Adel
[Bye]
3	(France) Camille Serme
[Bye]

Second round
1	(Egypt) Nour El Sherbini	11	12	11
(Wales) Emily Whitlock	7	10	5
(Canada) Danielle Letourneau	11	11	11
(South Africa) Alexandra Fuller	6	5	2
(Switzerland) Cindy Merlo	4	3	4
(England) Lucy Turmel	11	11	11
(Egypt) Farida Mohamed	11	9	11	12
5	(England) Sarah-Jane Perry	4	11	8	10
8	(Egypt) Rowan Elaraby	15	11	5	11
(United States) Olivia Fiechter	13	9	11	5
(Hong Kong) Liu Tsz-Ling	10	11	3	11
(England) Jasmine Hutton	12	9	11	13
(Scotland) Lisa Aitken	11	11	11
(Egypt) Hana Ramadan	8	6	3
(Egypt) Yathreb Adel	3	2	3
3	(France) Camille Serme	11	11	11

Third round
1	(Egypt) Nour El Sherbini	12	11	11
(Canada) Danielle Letourneau	10	5	3
(England) Lucy Turmel	10	13	5	8
(Egypt) Farida Mohamed	12	11	11	11
8	(Egypt) Rowan Elaraby	11	11	11
(England) Jasmine Hutton	6	2	7
(Scotland) Lisa Aitken	11	7	5	1
3	(France) Camille Serme	9	11	11	11

Quarter-finals
1	(Egypt) Nour El Sherbini	11	11	11
(Egypt) Farida Mohamed	2	4	4
Semi-finals
1	(Egypt) Nour El Sherbini	11	8	11	8
3	(France) Camille Serme	2	11	1	9^{r}
8	(Egypt) Rowan Elaraby	10	3	2
3	(France) Camille Serme	12	11	11

==== Bottom half ====
First round
4	(United States) Amanda Sobhy
[Bye]
(Egypt) Menna Nasser	9	2	6
(Netherlands) Milou van der Heijden	11	11	11
(France) Melissa Alves	11	13	10	11
(Hong Kong) Tsz-Wing Tong	6	11	12	7
(United States) Olivia Clyne
[Bye]
(France) Enora Villard	9	2	7
(Egypt) Jana Shiha	11	11	11
(India) Nadine Shahin
[Bye]
(France) Coline Aumard	11	11	7	8	11
(Finland) Emilia Soini	9	8	11	11	1
7	(Egypt) Salma Hany
[Bye]
6	(Egypt) Hania El Hammamy
[Bye]
(United States) Sabrina Sobhy
[Bye]
(Australia) Donna Lobban	11	11	11
(Egypt) Malak Khafagy	9	1	5
(Belgium) Nele Gilis
[Bye]
(Egypt) Mariam Metwally	11	11	12
(Hong Kong) Tze Lok Ho	4	5	10
(Egypt) Hana Moataz	3	11	10	6
(Egypt) Nada Abbas	11	8	12	11
(Canada) Hollie Naughton
[Bye]
2	(Egypt) Nouran Gohar
[Bye]

Second round
4	(United States) Amanda Sobhy	11	11	11
(Netherlands) Milou van der Heijden	4	6	3
(France) Melissa Alves	11	9	9	11	10
(United States) Olivia Clyne	9	11	11	7	12
(Egypt) Jana Shiha	9	11	11	7	14
(India) Nadine Shahin	11	6	8	11	12
(France) Coline Aumard	11	8	5	6
7	(Egypt) Salma Hany	8	11	11	11
6	(Egypt) Hania El Hammamy	11	11	11
(United States) Sabrina Sobhy	8	2	6
(Australia) Donna Lobban	8	7	8
(Belgium) Nele Gilis	11	11	11
(Egypt) Mariam Metwally	9	11	6	11	1
(Egypt) Nada Abbas	11	9	11	6	11
(Canada) Hollie Naughton	7	3	5
2	(Egypt) Nouran Gohar	11	11	11

Third round
4	(United States) Amanda Sobhy	9	18	11	11	11
(United States) Olivia Clyne	11	20	2	2	8
(Egypt) Jana Shiha	5	5	5
7	(Egypt) Salma Hany	11	11	11
6	(Egypt) Hania El Hammamy	11	11	11	11
(Belgium) Nele Gilis	13	2	7	4
(Egypt) Nada Abbas	3	2	5
2	(Egypt) Nouran Gohar	11	11	11

Quarter-finals
4	(United States) Amanda Sobhy	12	11	11
7	(Egypt) Salma Hany	10	3	2
Semi-finals
4	(United States) Amanda Sobhy	9	2	7
2	(Egypt) Nouran Gohar	11	11	11
6	(Egypt) Hania El Hammamy	6	8	11	6
2	(Egypt) Nouran Gohar	11	11	4	11

== See also ==
- 2021 Men's Egyptian Squash Open
