= 2019 Women's World Junior Squash Championships =

Women's World Junior 2019
- 27th WSF Women's World Junior Championship
- Location: (Malaysia) Kuala Lumpur
- Website www.wsfworldjuniors.com

Results
- Champion: (Egypt) Hania El Hammamy
- Runner-up: (Egypt) Jana Shiha
- Semi-finalists: (Egypt) Farida Mohamed (Malaysia) Aifa Azman

The 2019 Women's World Junior Squash Championships was the women's edition of the 2019 World Junior Squash Championships, which serves as the individual world Junior championship for squash players. The event took place in Kuala Lumpur in Malaysia from 30 July to 4 August 2019.

Rowan Reda Araby of Egypt is the defending champion of this competition after defeating compatriot Hania El Hammamy in the final of the 2018 edition.

== Seeds ==
The seeds was published on 12 July 2019.

1. [1*] (Egypt) Hania El Hammamy (champions)
2. [2*] (Egypt) Jana Shiha (final)
3. [3/4*] (Egypt) Farida Mohamed (semifinals)
4. [3/4*] (Malaysia) Aifa Azman (semifinals)
5. [5/8*] (Hong Kong) Chan Sin Yuk (quarterfinals)
6. [5/8*] (Malaysia) Chan Yiwen (quarterfinals)
7. [5/8*] (England) Elise Lazarus (quarterfinals)
8. [5/8*] (United States) Marina Stefanoni (quarterfinals)
9. [9/12*] (England) Alice Green (fourth round)
10. [9/12*] (Egypt) Sana Ibrahim (fourth round)
11. [9/12*] (Malaysia) Ooi Kah Yan (fourth round)
12. [9/12*] (Scotland) Georgia Adderley (fourth round)
13. [13/16*] (New Zealand) Kaitlyn Watts (withdrew)
14. [13/16*] (United States) Olivia Robinson (third round)
15. [13/16*] (United States) Elisabeth Ross (second round)
16. [13/16*] (Egypt) Nour Khaled Aboulmakarim (fourth round)

== Draw and results ==
=== Finals ===
Quarter-finals
1	(Egypt) Hania El Hammamy	14	11	12
5/8	(Hong Kong) Chan Sin Yuk	12	3	10
3/4	(Egypt) Farida Mohamed	3	11	11	11
5/8	(Malaysia) Chan Yiwen	11	7	5	9
5/8	(England) Elise Lazarus	10	8	5
3/4	(Malaysia) Aifa Azman	12	11	11
5/8	(United States) Marina Stefanoni	11	5	7	7
2	(Egypt) Jana Shiha	7	11	11	11

Semi-finals
1	(Egypt) Hania El Hammamy	11	11	4	11
3/4	(Egypt) Farida Mohamed	8	6	11	3
3/4	(Malaysia) Aifa Azman	12	12	11	14	7
2	(Egypt) Jana Shiha	10	14	2	16	11

Final
1	(Egypt) Hania El Hammamy	11	11	11
2	(Egypt) Jana Shiha	9	6	8

=== Top half ===
==== Section 1 ====
First round
(Chinese Taipei) Hsiao Nai-wen	5	5	4
(France) Yuna Loaec	11	11	11
(Japan) Ayumi Watanabe	5	11	12	4	4
(India) Ananya Dabke	11	9	10	11	11
(Canada) Brianna Jefferson	14	11	11
(South Africa) Monique Da Cruz	12	3	8
(Australia) Lee Sze Yu	8	8	5
(United States) Lucie Stefanoni	11	11	11

Second round
1	(Egypt) Hania El Hammamy	11	11	11
(France) Yuna Loaec	4	1	1
(Malaysia) Yee Xin Ying	11	12	11
(India) Ananya Dabke	6	10	4
13/16	(New Zealand) Kaitlyn Watts
(Canada) Brianna Jefferson	w	/	o
(Hong Kong) Lee Sum Yuet	11	11	11
(United States) Lucie Stefanoni	7	7	6

Third Round
1	(Egypt) Hania El Hammamy	14	11	11
(Malaysia) Yee Xin Ying	12	5	4
(Canada) Brianna Jefferson	10	7	9
(Hong Kong) Lee Sum Yuet	12	11	11

Fourth round
1	(Egypt) Hania El Hammamy	11	11	11
(Hong Kong) Lee Sum Yuet	2	4	6

==== Section 2 ====
First round
(Republic of Ireland) Kelly Byrne	1	6	7
(Germany) Lucie Mährle	11	11	11
(Singapore) Paige Teresa Hill	11	7	4	5
(South Korea) Shin Yu-jin	8	11	11	11
(Russia) Alesya Aleshina	2	11	11	11	10
(Switzerland) Cassandra Fitze	11	5	5	13	12
(Sweden) Malin Frank	11	11	11
(Scotland) Megan Evans (squash player)	6	8	3

Second round
5/8	(Hong Kong) Chan Sin Yuk	11	11	11
(Germany) Lucie Mährle	2	4	2
(India) Yoshna Singh	11	11	11
(South Korea) Shin Yu-jin	6	4	3
9/12	(England) Alice Green	11	11	11
(Switzerland) Cassandra Fitze	5	6	6
(Colombia) Lucía Bautista	11	12	11
(Sweden) Malin Frank	4	10	8

Third Round
5/8	(Hong Kong) Chan Sin Yuk	11	11	11
(India) Yoshna Singh	3	4	4
9/12	(England) Alice Green	11	11	11
(Colombia) Lucía Bautista	1	8	6

Fourth round
5/8	(Hong Kong) Chan Sin Yuk	11	11	11
9/12	(England) Alice Green	5	6	7

==== Section 3 ====
First round
(Canada) Molly Chadwick	6	8	11	11	11
(Hong Kong) Heylie Fung	11	11	4	9	5
(Macau) Leng Lam Leong	2	4	5
(France) Mahe Asensi	11	11	11
(Colombia) Amalia Rios	11	11	11
(South Africa) Alouise Campher	0	0	0
(Australia) Kurstyn Mather	5	9	11	11	8
(Sweden) Nathalie Malmstrom	11	11	4	1	11

Second round
3/4	(Egypt) Farida Mohamed	11	11	11
(Canada) Molly Chadwick	7	2	4
(England) Evie Coxon	11	11	11
(France) Mahe Asensi	1	6	9
13/16	(United States) Olivia Robinson	11	11	11
(Colombia) Amalia Rios	5	7	3
(Malaysia) Aira Azman	11	11	11
(Sweden) Nathalie Malmstrom	4	2	2

Third Round
3/4	(Egypt) Farida Mohamed	11	15	11
(England) Evie Coxon	7	13	3
13/16	(United States) Olivia Robinson	5	3	5
(Malaysia) Aira Azman	11	11	11

Fourth round
3/4	(Egypt) Farida Mohamed	12	12	11
(Malaysia) Aira Azman	10	10	8

==== Section 4 ====
First round
(Japan) Erisa Sano Herring	5	7	9
(Canada) Lucia Bicknell	11	11	11
(New Zealand) Natalie Sayes	10	6	11	11	10
(Czech Republic) Tereza Široká	12	11	6	7	12
(India) Sonya Bajaj	6	11	11	11
(Switzerland) Alina Pössl	11	6	9	8
(Chinese Taipei) Wang Yuan	3	5	5
(Republic of Ireland) Emma McGugan	11	11	11

Second round
5/8	(Malaysia) Chan Yiwen	11	11	11
(Canada) Lucia Bicknell	1	1	6
(Malaysia) Ainaa Ampandi	11	11	11
(Czech Republic) Tereza Široká	1	8	4
9/12	(Egypt) Sana Ibrahim	11	11	11
(India) Sonya Bajaj	7	3	4
(Egypt) Malak Mostafa	11	11	11
(Republic of Ireland) Emma McGugan	3	2	7

Third Round
5/8	(Malaysia) Chan Yiwen	11	12	11
(Malaysia) Ainaa Ampandi	8	10	6
9/12	(Egypt) Sana Ibrahim	11	13	11	11
(Egypt) Malak Mostafa	8	15	7	9

Fourth round
5/8	(Malaysia) Chan Yiwen	11	8	11	11
9/12	(Egypt) Sana Ibrahim	8	11	7	7

=== Bottom half ===
==== Section 5 ====
First round
(Japan) Rafu Takahashi	1	8	1
(Canada) Erica McGillicuddy	11	11	11
(France) Lea Barbeau	11	12	11
(Republic of Ireland) Emma Lundy	6	10	7
(Chinese Taipei) Chen Pin-yu	6	3	2
(Singapore) Lim Wei Ting	11	11	11
(Australia) Erin Classen	11	12	8	6	11
(South Africa) Faith Panashe Sithole	3	10	11	11	8

Second round
(Canada) Erica McGillicuddy	11	11	9	15
(Australia) Alex Haydon	7	9	11	13
(France) Lea Barbeau	6	5	2
9/12	(Malaysia) Ooi Kah Yan	11	11	11
(Singapore) Lim Wei Ting	2	3	5
(Czech Republic) Michaela Cepova	11	11	11
(Australia) Erin Classen	8	4	3
5/8	(England) Elise Lazarus	11	11	11

Third Round
(Canada) Erica McGillicuddy	8	4	4
9/12	(Malaysia) Ooi Kah Yan	11	11	11
(Czech Republic) Michaela Cepova	5	4	8
5/8	(England) Elise Lazarus	11	11	11

Fourth round
9/12	(Malaysia) Ooi Kah Yan	8	8	8
5/8	(England) Elise Lazarus	11	11	11

==== Section 6 ====
First round
(Sweden) Sara Månberg	11	11	1	11	7
(Macau) Gigi Yeung	13	7	11	9	11
(Hong Kong) Kirstie Wong	11	11	11
(Germany) Alexandra Kotkolik	9	6	1
(India) Amira Singh	11	11	11
(Switzerland) Simona Frevel	7	8	5
(New Zealand) Ella Lash	3	6	9
(Norway) Madeleine Hylland	11	11	11

Second round
(Macau) Gigi Yeung	11	9	7	5
(New Zealand) Anika Jackson	5	11	11	11
(Hong Kong) Kirstie Wong	6	12	11	12
13/16	(United States) Elisabeth Ross	11	10	8	10
(India) Amira Singh	5	6	6
(India) Sanya Vats	11	11	11
(Norway) Madeleine Hylland	5	2	9
3/4	(Malaysia) Aifa Azman	11	11	11

Third Round
(New Zealand) Anika Jackson	7	5	7
(Hong Kong) Kirstie Wong	11	11	11
(India) Sanya Vats	7	7	12	6
3/4	(Malaysia) Aifa Azman	11	11	10	11

Fourth round
(Hong Kong) Kirstie Wong	2	3	2
3/4	(Malaysia) Aifa Azman	11	11	11

==== Section 7 ====
First round
(Canada) Sarah Cao	9	7	7
(South Africa) Helena Coetzee	11	11	11
(Australia) Katie Davies	8	9	7
(France) Ninon Lemarchand	11	11	11
(Japan) Kurumi Takahashi	11	10	11	11
(Chinese Taipei) Wu Yi-chen	4	12	1	2
(Sweden) Anna Kaiding	2	2	4
(United States) Serena Daniel	11	11	11
(England) Katie Wells	11	11	11
(Republic of Ireland) Alessia Osborne	6	5	1

Second round
(South Africa) Helena Coetzee	6	9	9
(India) Aishwarya Khubchandani	11	11	11
(France) Ninon Lemarchand	7	5	3
9/12	(Scotland) Georgia Adderley	11	11	11
(Japan) Kurumi Takahashi	5	1	2
(United States) Serena Daniel	11	11	11
(England) Katie Wells	6	11	6	3
5/8	(United States) Marina Stefanoni	11	8	11	11

Third Round
(India) Aishwarya Khubchandani	11	8	6	9
9/12	(Scotland) Georgia Adderley	8	11	11	11
(United States) Serena Daniel	4	5	6
5/8	(United States) Marina Stefanoni	11	11	11

Fourth round
9/12	(Scotland) Georgia Adderley	4	8	2
5/8	(United States) Marina Stefanoni	11	11	11

==== Section 8 ====
First round
(New Zealand) Georgia Robcke	9	4	4
(South Korea) Song Chae-won	11	11	11
(India) Megha Bhatia	3	9	4
(United States) Caroline Spahr	11	11	11
(South Africa) Teagan Roux	9	10	12
(Australia) Remashree Muniandy	11	12	14
(Canada) Charlotte Orcutt	11	11	11
(South Korea) Jang Yea-won	6	3	5
(Sweden) Moa Bönnemark
(Switzerland) Ambre Allinckx	w	/	o
(New Zealand) Sophie Hodges	11	11	10	6	9
(South Africa) Taryn Emslie	9	4	12	11	11

Second round
(South Korea) Song Chae-won	9	8	4
(United States) Caroline Spahr	11	11	11
(Australia) Remashree Muniandy	3	3	6
13/16	(Egypt) Nour Khaled Aboulmakarim	11	11	11
(Canada) Charlotte Orcutt	9	3	5
(Switzerland) Ambre Allinckx	11	11	11
(South Africa) Taryn Emslie	2	1	1
2	(Egypt) Jana Shiha	11	11	11

Third Round
(United States) Caroline Spahr	7	4	9
13/16	(Egypt) Nour Khaled Aboulmakarim	11	11	11
(Switzerland) Ambre Allinckx	8	1	9
2	(Egypt) Jana Shiha	11	11	11

Fourth round
13/16	(Egypt) Nour Khaled Aboulmakarim	5	8	5
2	(Egypt) Jana Shiha	11	11	11

== See also ==
- 2019 Men's World Junior Squash Championships
- World Junior Squash Championships

Preceded by India (Chennai); 2018	Squash World Junior; Malaysia (Kuala Lumpur); 2018	Succeeded by Australia (Gold Coast); 2020
