= 2018 Women's World Junior Squash Championships =

Squash Championships

Women's World Junior 2018
- 26th WSF Women's World Junior Championship
- Location: (India) Chennai
- Website www.wsfworldjuniors.com

Results
- Champion: (Egypt) Rowan Reda Araby
- Runner-up: (Egypt) Hania El Hammamy
- Semi-finalists: (Egypt) Jana Ashraf (England) Lucy Turmel

The 2018 Women's World Junior Squash Championships is the women's edition of the 2018 World Junior Squash Championships, which serves as the individual world Junior championship for squash players. The event took place in Chennai in India from 18 to 23 July 2018.

Rowan Reda Araby won the tournament after defeating compatriot Hania El Hammamy in the final.

== Seeds ==
1. [1*] (Egypt) Rowan Reda Araby (champions)
2. [2*] (Egypt) Hania El Hammamy (final)
3. [3/4*] (England) Lucy Turmel (semifinals)
4. [3/4*] (Malaysia) Aifa Azman (third round)
5. [5/8*] (United States) Marina Stefanoni (quarterfinals)
6. [5/8*] (England) Elise Lazarus (second round)
7. [5/8*] (Egypt) Jana Shiha (semifinals)
8. [5/8*] (Egypt) Hana Moataz (quarterfinals)
9. [9/12*] (England) Alice Green (third round)
10. [9/12*] (Malaysia) Lai Wen Li (third round)
11. [9/12*] (Scotland) Georgia Adderley (third round)
12. [9/12*] (Egypt) Ingy Hammouda (third round)
13. [13/16*] (Malaysia) Ooi Kah Yan (third round)
14. [13/16*] (Malaysia) Chan Yiwen (third round)
15. [13/16*] (Hong Kong) Chan Sin Yuk (second round)
16. [13/16*] (Egypt) Farida Mohamed (quarterfinals)

== Draw and results ==
=== Finals ===
Semi-finals
(Egypt) Rowan Reda Araby	11	13	11
5/8	(Egypt) Jana Ashraf	5	11	6
3/4	(England) Lucy Turmel	6	11	4	4
2	(Egypt) Hania El Hammamy	11	8	11	11

Final
1	(Egypt) Rowan Reda Araby	11	11	10	11
2	(Egypt) Hania El Hammamy	4	9	12	9

=== Top half ===
==== Section 1 ====
First round
(Australia) Grace Pattison	11	8	6	11	4
(India) Ashita Bhengra	7	11	11	9	11
(South Africa) Izane Louw	10	11	11	11	10
(Iran) Halya Estili	12	13	3	8	12
(United States) Elisabeth Ross	4	3	6
13/16	(Malaysia) Chan Yiwen	11	11	11
(United States) Meghna Sreedhar	5	6	4
(Hong Kong) Cheng Nga Ching	11	11	11
(New Zealand) Courtney Trail	3	11	11	6	3
(Poland) Karyna Tyma	11	4	7	11	11

Second round
1	(Egypt) Rowan Reda Araby	11	11	11
(India) Ashita Bhengra	4	8	2
(Iran) Halya Estili
13/16	(Malaysia) Chan Yiwen	11	11	11
9/12	(England) Alice Green	11	11	11	11
(Hong Kong) Cheng Nga Ching	13	4	8	9
(Poland) Karyna Tyma	6	6	12
5/8	(Egypt) Hana Moataz	11	11	14

Third Round
1	(Egypt) Rowan Reda Araby	11	11	11
13/16	(Malaysia) Chan Yiwen	4	5	2
9/12	(England) Alice Green	8	3	9
5/8	(Egypt) Hana Moataz	11	11	11

Quarter-finals
1	(Egypt) Rowan Reda Araby	12	11	11
5/8	(Egypt) Hana Moataz	10	6	3

==== Section 2 ====
First round
(India) Yoshna Singh	8	7	7
(United States) Elle Ruggiero	11	11	11
(Australia) Courtney Mather	11	12	6	5	9
(South Africa) Helena Coetzee	9	10	11	11	11
(New Zealand) Diya Joukani	5	6	2
9/12	(Malaysia) Lai Wen Li	11	11	11
13/16	(Egypt) Farida Mohamed	11	11	11
(India) Jannia Singh	6	8	4
(Switzerland) Sarah Lüdin	11	6	12	11	8
(New Zealand) Georgia Robcke	13	11	10	1	11
(Zimbabwe) Hannah Mannion	2	4	2
(Iran) Fereshteh Eghtedari	11	11	11

Second round
5/8	(Egypt) Jana Shiha	11	11	11
(United States) Elle Ruggiero	4	5	8
(South Africa) Helena Coetzee	4	6	5
9/12	(Malaysia) Lai Wen Li	11	11	11
13/16	(Egypt) Farida Mohamed	11	11	11
(New Zealand) Georgia Robcke	7	3	3
(Iran) Fereshteh Eghtedari	4	6	2
3/4	(Malaysia) Aifa Azman	11	11	11

Third Round
5/8	(Egypt) Jana Shiha	11	9	11	11
9/12	(Malaysia) Lai Wen Li	6	11	5	4
13/16	(Egypt) Farida Mohamed	15	11	11	4	11
3/4	(Malaysia) Aifa Azman	17	7	7	11	6

Quarter-finals
5/8	(Egypt) Jana Shiha	7	11	11	7	15
13/16	(Egypt) Farida Mohamed	11	6	5	11	13

=== Bottom half ===
==== Section 3 ====
First round
(New Zealand) Kaitlyn Watts	10	10	11	4
(United States) Laila Sedky	12	12	8	11
(Malaysia) Jessica Keng	11	11	11
(South Africa) Reese Bain	1	5	1
(India) Ananya Dabke	9	8	2
13/16	(Hong Kong) Chan Sin Yuk	11	11	11
9/12	(Egypt) Ingy Hammouda	11	11	11
(New Zealand) Annaleise Faint	2	0	4
(India) Sanya Vats	11	11	11
(Zimbabwe) Polite Mubure	7	6	3
(Singapore) Sneha Sivakumar	11	11	3	11
(Malaysia) Aira Azman	6	5	11	2

Second round
3/4	(England) Lucy Turmel	12	11	11
(United States) Laila Sedky	10	3	6
(Malaysia) Jessica Keng	11	12	4	10	11
13/16	(Hong Kong) Chan Sin Yuk	9	10	11	12	9
9/12	(Egypt) Ingy Hammouda	11	8	11	11
(India) Sanya Vats	7	11	4	9
(Singapore) Sneha Sivakumar	10	11	11	11
5/8	(England) Elise Lazarus	12	4	6	6

Third Round
3/4	(England) Lucy Turmel	11	11	13
(Malaysia) Jessica Keng	8	6	11
9/12	(Egypt) Ingy Hammouda	11	6	11	11	9
(Singapore) Sneha Sivakumar	7	11	13	7	11

Quarter-finals
3/4	(England) Lucy Turmel	11	11	11
(Singapore) Sneha Sivakumar	5	8	8

==== Section 4 ====
First round
(Iran) Niki Shemirani	6	7	11	2
(Australia) Alexandra Haydon	11	11	9	11
(Macau) Gigi Yeung	11	11	11
(Australia) Pascale Louka	6	2	7
(Switzerland) Simona Frevel	3	4	4
9/12	(Scotland) Georgia Adderley	11	11	11
13/16	(Malaysia) Ooi Kah Yan	11	11	11
(United States) Caroline Spahr	6	8	7
(Canada) Emma Jinks	11	11	11
(New Zealand) Winona-Jo Joyce	6	8	2
(South Africa) Teagan Roux	6	5	6
(India) Aishwarya Khubchandani	11	11	11

Second round
5/8	(United States) Marina Stefanoni	10	11	11	11
(Australia) Alexandra Haydon	12	6	8	1
(Macau) Gigi Yeung	5	3	6
9/12	(Scotland) Georgia Adderley	11	11	11
13/16	(Malaysia) Ooi Kah Yan	11	9	12	11
(Canada) Emma Jinks	7	11	10	7
(India) Aishwarya Khubchandani	6	5	9
2	(Egypt) Hania El Hammamy	11	11	11

Third Round
5/8	(United States) Marina Stefanoni	11	4	11	11
9/12	(Scotland) Georgia Adderley	8	11	9	8
13/16	(Malaysia) Ooi Kah Yan	8	8	7
2	(Egypt) Hania El Hammamy	11	11	11

Quarter-finals
5/8	(United States) Marina Stefanoni	2	4	7
2	(Egypt) Hania El Hammamy	11	11	11

== See also ==
- 2018 Men's World Junior Squash Championships
- World Junior Squash Championships

Preceded by New Zealand (Tauranga); 2017	Squash World Junior; India (Chennai); 2018	Succeeded by Malaysia (Kuala Lumpur); 2019
