= Women's El Gouna International 2021 =

El Gouna International 2021
- 10th El Gouna International

Details
- Event name: El Gouna International Squash Open 2021
- Location: El Gouna Egypt
- Venue: Abu Tig Marina
- Website www.elgounasquashopen.com

Men's Winner
- Category: World Tour
- Prize money: $181,500
- Year: 2021

The El Gouna International 2021 is the women's edition of the 2021 El Gouna International, which is a PSA World Tour event part of the 2020–21 PSA World Tour. The event took place in Abu Tig Marina at El Gouna, Egypt from 20 May to 28 May.

== Prize money and ranking points ==
For the 2021 event, the prize money is $181,500. The prize money and points breakdown is as follows:

Prize money El Gouna International (2021)
| Event | W | F | SF | QF | 3R | 2R | 1R |
| Points (PSA) | 2750 | 1810 | 1100 | 675 | 410 | 250 | 152.5 |

== Seeds ==
1. (Egypt) Nour El Sherbini (champion)
2. (Egypt) Nouran Gohar (final)
3. (France) Camille Serme (quarter-finals)
4. (Egypt) Amanda Sobhy (semi-finals)
5. (England) Sarah-Jane Perry (quarter-finals)
6. (Egypt) Hania El Hammamy (semi-finals)
7. (New Zealand) Joelle King (third round)
8. (Egypt) Salma Hany (quarter-finals)

== Draw and results ==
=== Key ===
- w/o = Walkover
- r = Retired

=== Finals ===
Semi finals
1 | (Egypt) N El Sherbini | 11 | 11 | 7 | 7 | 11
6 | (Egypt) H El Hammamy | 7 | 7 | 11 | 11 | 5
3 | (United States) A Sobhy | 6 | 8 | 2
2 | (Egypt) N Gohar | 11 | 11 | 11

Final
1 | (Egypt) N El Sherbini | 11 | 11 | 11
2 | (Egypt) N Gohar | 7 | 8 | 5

=== Top half ===
==== Section 1 ====
First round
1 | (Egypt) N El Sherbini
Bye
(Egypt) N Aboulmakarim | 9 | 13 | 12 | 8
(Egypt) F Mohamed | 11 | 15 | 10 | 11
(Egypt) Y Adel
Bye
(Egypt) H Ramadan | 11 | 11 | 5 | 11
(Egypt) N Shahin | 8 | 4 | 11 | 7
(Egypt) M Metwally | 11 | 11 | 11
(Switzerland) C Merlo | 4 | 6 | 3
(England) A Waters
Bye
(Egypt) M Hany | 11 | 1 | 11 | 5 | 11
(Czech Republic) A Serme | 7 | 11 | 6 | 11' | 6
5 | (England) SJ Perry
Bye

Second round
1 | (Egypt) N El Sherbini | 11 | 11 | 11
(Egypt) F Mohamed | 9 | 4 | 5
(Egypt) Y Adel | 11 | 11 | 11
(Egypt) H Ramadan | 8 | 2 | 3
(Egypt) M Metwally | 5 | 9 | 11 | 9
(England) A Waters | 11 | 11 | 9 | 11
(Egypt) M Hany
5 | (England) SJ Perry | w/o

Third round
1 | (Egypt) N El Sherbini | w/o
(Egypt) Y Adel
(England) A Waters | 6 | 4 | r
5 | (England) SJ Perry | 11 | 11

Quarter finals
1 | (Egypt) N El Sherbini | 11 | 11 | 11
5 | (England) SJ Perry | 4 | 6 | 6

==== Section 2 ====
First round
6 | (Egypt) H El Hammamy
Bye
(Latvia) I Mackevica | 6 | 3 | 9
(Wales) E Whitlock | 11 | 11 | 11
(Egypt) N Abbas | 11 | 11 | 11
(Canada) N Bunyan | 4 | 7 | 3
(Egypt) M Hamed | 9 | 11 | 13 | 6 | 11
(France) M Alves | 11 | 6 | 11 | 11 | 6
(Canada) H Naughton | 11 | 12 | 11 | 14
(Egypt) H Moataz | 7 | 14 | 8 | 12
(India) J Chinappa
Bye
(Belgium) T Gilis
Bye
3 | (France) C Serme
Bye

Second round
6 | (Egypt) H El Hammamy | 11 | 11 | 11
(Wales) E Whitlock | 6 | 5 | 4
(Egypt) N Abbas | 11 | 8 | 11 | 11
(Egypt) M Hamed | 3 | 11 | 6 | 6
(Canada) H Naughton | 10 | 11 | 11 | 6 | 11
(India) J Chinappa | 12 | 4 | 6 | 11 | 8
(Belgium) T Gilis | 4 | 13 | 10 | 9
3 | (France) C Serme | 11 | 11 | 12 | 11

Third round
6 | (Egypt) H El Hammamy | 11 | 9 | 12 | 11
(Egypt) N Abbas | 6 | 11 | 10 | 6
(Canada) H Naughton | 5 | 7 | 2
3 | (France) C Serme | 11 | 11 | 11

Quarter finals
6 | (Egypt) H El Hammamy | 11 | 11 | 9 | 11
3 | (France) C Serme | 2 | 6 | 11 | 7

=== Bottom half ===
==== Section 3 ====
First round
4 | (United States) A Sobhy
Bye
(Egypt) M Nasser | 11 | 4 | 4 | 3
(Canada) D Letourneau | 9 | 11 | 11 | 11
(England) L Turmel | 11 | 11 | 11
(Finland) E Soini | 3 | 3 | 8
(United States) O Clyne
Bye
(United States) O Fiechter | 11 | 11 | 11
(Egypt) H El Dafrawy | 3 | 1 | 4
(Belgium) N Gilis
Bye
(South Africa) A Fuller | 11 | 11 | 11
(Switzerland) N Pfister | 2 | 4 | 9
8 | (Egypt) S Hany
Bye

Second round
4 | (United States) A Sobhy | 5 | 11 | 11 | 11
(Canada) D Letourneau | 11 | 4 | 9 | 9
(England) L Turmel | 11 | 11 | 11
(United States) O Clyne | 8 | 5 | 5
(United States) O Fiechter | 3 | 11 | 11 | 11
(Belgium) N Gilis | 11 | 9 | 9 | 6
(South Africa) A Fuller | 13 | 7 | 8 | 7
8 | (Egypt) S Hany | 11 | 11 | 11 | 11

Third round
4 | (United States) A Sobhy | 11 | 11 | 11
(England) L Turmel | 6 | 7 | 7
(United States) O Fiechter | 3 | 4 | 6
8 | (Egypt) S Hany | 11 | 11 | 11

Quarter finals
4 | (United States) A Sobhy | 9 | 11 | 11 | 11
8 | (Egypt) S Hany | 11 | 7 | 2 | 6

==== Section 4 ====
First round
7 | (New Zealand) J King
Bye
(Egypt) J Shiha | 10 | 11 | 11 | 11
(France) C Aumard | 12 | 5 | 9 | 6
(Egypt) R Elaraby
Bye
(France) E Villard | 11 | 11 | 12
(United States) H Mendez | 5 | 8 | 10
(Wales) T Evans
Bye
(Egypt) S Ibrahim | 7 | 12 | 8
(Malaysia) S Subramaniam | 11 | 14 | 11
(Egypt) Z Mickawy | 11 | 11 | 11
(Netherlands) T ter Sluis | 3 | 5 | 5
2 | (Egypt) N Gohar
Bye

Second round
7 | (New Zealand) J King | 11 | 11 | 11
(Egypt) J Shiha | 7 | 7 | 5
(Egypt) R Elaraby | 4 | 11 | 11 | 11
(France) E Villard | 11 | 4 | 8 | 3
(Wales) T Evans | 4 | 11 | 11 | 5 | 6
(Malaysia) S Subramaniam | 11 | 5 | 4 | 11 | 11
(Egypt) Z Mickawy | 1 | 9 | 1
2 | (Egypt) N Gohar | 11 | 11 | 11

Third round
7 | (New Zealand) J King | 6 | 10 | 8
(Egypt) R Elaraby | 11 | 12 | 11
(Malaysia) S Subramaniam | 9 | 10 | 7
2 | (Egypt) N Gohar | 11 | 12 | 11

Quarter finals
(Egypt) R Elaraby | 2 | 5 | 13 | 9
2 | (Egypt) N Gohar | 11 | 11 | 11 | 11

== See also ==
- Men's El Gouna International 2021
- El Gouna International
