= 2024–25 PSA World Events =

2024–25 PSA Squash Tour – World Events

Details
- Event name: 2024–25 PSA Squash Tour – World Events
- Website; PSA Squash Tour standings
- Year: 2024–25 PSA Squash Tour

The 2024–25 PSA Squash Tour – World Events is a series of men's and women's squash tournaments which are part of the Professional Squash Association (PSA) PSA Squash Tour from August 2024 until July 2025. The PSA Squash Tour – World Events tournaments are some of the most prestigious events on the men's and women's tour. The best-performing players in the PSA Squash Tour – World Events qualify for the annual Men's and Women's Finals.

Starting in August 2024, PSA replaced World Tour tournaments with new PSA World Events, comprising four new tournament-tiers: Diamond ($300,000), Platinum ($190,000), Gold ($100,000), Silver ($75,000), Bronze ($50,000) and Copper ($25,000) each one awarding different points.

== PSA World Ranking Points ==
PSA Squash Tour – World Events also have a separate PSA Squash Tour ranking. Points for this are calculated on a cumulative basis after each event. The top eight players at the end of the calendar year are then eligible to play in the PSA Squash Tour Finals.

Ranking points vary according to tournament tier being awarded as follows:

Tournament			Ranking Points
Rank	Prize Money US$	Ranking Points	Winner	Runner up	3/4	5/8	9/16	17/32	33/48
World Championship	$600,000	27683 points	3500	2275	1400	875	525	321	196
Diamond	$300,000	24511 points	3100	2015	1240	775	465	284	173.5
Platinum	$190,000	17132 points	2800	1820	1120	700	420	257
Gold	$100,000	11010 points	1800	1170	720	450	270	165
Silver	$75,000	8261.5 points	1350	877.5	540	337.5	202.5	124
Bronze	$50,000	5505 points	900	585	360	225	135	82.5
Copper	$25,000	3061 points	500	325	200	125	75	46

== Men's ==
=== Tournaments ===
Tournament	Country	Location	Rank	Prize money	Date	Winner
CIB Egyptian Open	Egypt	Giza	Diamond	$325,500	30 Aug–6 Sep. 2024	(Egypt) Mostafa Asal
Paris Squash	France	Paris	Platinum	$213,000	15–21 September 2024	(Egypt) Mostafa Asal
NASH Cup	Canada	London	Copper	$28,750	17–21 September 2024	(Egypt) Mohamad Zakaria
Budapest Open	Hungary	Budapest	Copper	$30,000	22–26 September 2024	(England) Jonah Bryant
Charlottesville Open	United States	Charlottesville	Copper	$28,750	24–28 September 2024	(Pakistan) Asim Khan
QTerminals Qatar Classic	Qatar	Doha	Platinum	$215,000	30 Sep.–5 Oct. 2024	(Peru) Diego Elías
Open Squash Classic	United States	New York City	Bronze	$56,380	6–10 October 2024	(England) Marwan El Shorbagy
Silicon Valley Open	United States	Redwood City	Gold	$122,000	11–16 October 2024	(Wales) Joel Makin
Richardson Wealth Men’s PSA Open	Canada	Vancouver	Copper	$28,750	16–20 October 2024	(Scotland) Greg Lobban
Comcast Business U.S. Open	United States	Philadelphia	Platinum	$213,500	19–26 October 2024	(Egypt) Ali Farag
Cambridge Group of Clubs Classic	Canada	Toronto	Copper	$38,750	27–31 October 2024	(Mexico) Leonel Cárdenas
China Open	China	Shanghai	Silver	$89,000	30 Oct.–3 Nov. 2024	(England) Mohamed El Shorbagy
Monit Czech Open	Czech Republic	Brno	Copper	$30,000	31 Oct.–4 Nov. 2024	(France) Sébastien Bonmalais
London Open	England	Camden, London	Copper	$33,000	6–10 November 2024	(England) Declan James
ACE Malaysia Squash Cup	Malaysia	Petaling Jaya	Bronze	$64,000	12–17 November 2024	(Malaysia) Eain Yow
VITAGEN Singapore Squash Open	Singapore	Kallang	Gold	$120,000	19–24 November 2024	(Egypt) Ali Farag
QSF No.5	Qatar	Doha	Bronze	$60,500	20–24 November 2024	(Egypt) Tarek Momen
Cape Town Squash Open	South Africa	Cape Town	Copper	$25,000	26–30 November 2024	(Qatar) Abdulla Al-Tamimi
Milwaukee Hong Kong Open	Hong Kong, China	Hong Kong	Platinum	$207,500	2–8 December 2024	(Egypt) Mostafa Asal
Squash In The Land	United States	Cleveland	Silver	$88,750	14–19 January 2025	(England) Marwan El Shorbagy
J.P. Morgan Tournament of Champions	United States	New York City	Platinum	$219,000	23–30 January 2025	(Egypt) Ali Farag
DR21 Motor City Open	United States	Bloomfield Hills	Silver	$82,000	4–8 February 2025	(New Zealand) Paul Coll
Pittsburgh Open	United States	Pittsburgh	Silver	$86,000	12–16 February 2025	(Wales) Joel Makin
Cotidie Texas Open	United States	Houston	Gold	$111,000	18–23 February 2025	(Egypt) Ali Farag
QSF No.2	Qatar	Doha	Bronze	$60,500	24–28 February 2025	(Egypt) Karim Gawad
AirSprint Canadian Men's Open	Canada	Calgary	Bronze	$68,500	24–28 February 2025	(England) Mohamed El Shorbagy
New Zealand Open	New Zealand	Christchurch	Silver	$93,000	4–9 March 2025	(New Zealand) Paul Coll
Easy Times Brewing Australian Open	Australia	Brisbane	Gold	$120,000	11–16 March 2025	(Egypt) Karim Gawad
German Open	Germany	Hamburg	Bronze	$60,500	19–23 March 2025	(France) Victor Crouin
JSW Indian Open	India	Mumbai	Copper	$38,500	24–28 March 2025	(Egypt) Kareem El Torkey
OptAsia Championships	England	Wimbledon	Gold	$118,000	25–30 March 2025	(Egypt) Mostafa Asal
Manchester Open	England	Manchester	Bronze	$66,500	2–6 April 2025	(Mexico) Leonel Cárdenas
El Gouna International	Egypt	El Gouna	Platinum	$217,500	12–18 April 2025	(Egypt) Mostafa Asal
Grasshopper Cup	Switzerland	Zurich	Gold	$123,000	22–27 April 2025	(Egypt) Ali Farag
Squash on Fire Open	United States	Washington, D.C.	Bronze	$58,750	23–27 April 2025	(England) Marwan El Shorbagy
IQUW Bermuda Open	Bermuda	Devonshire	Copper	$28,750	29 Apr.–3 May 2025	[[ ]]

=== Standings ===
World Championship
196	1st Round	321	2nd Round
525	3rd Round	875	Quarterfinalist
1400	Semifinalist	2275	Runner-up
**3500**	Winner		

Diamond
173.5	1st Round	284	2nd Round
465	3rd Round	775	Quarterfinalist
1240	Semifinalist	2015	Runner-up
**3100**	Winner		

Platinum
257	1st Round	420	2nd Round
700	Quarterfinalist	1120	Semifinalist
1820	Runner-up	**2800**	Winner

Gold
165	1st Round	270	2nd Round
450	Quarterfinalist	720	Semifinalist
1170	Runner-up	**1800**	Winner

Silver
124	1st Round	202.5	2nd Round
337.5	Quarterfinalist	540	Semifinalist
877.5	Runner-up	**1350**	Winner

Bronze
82.5	1st Round	135	2nd Round
225	Quarterfinalist	360	Semifinalist
585	Runner-up	**900**	Winner

Copper
46	1st Round	75	2nd Round
125	Quarterfinalist	200	Semifinalist
325	Runner-up	**500**	Winner

Top 16 Men's PSA Squash Tour – World Events Standings 2024–25
Rank	Player	Tournaments Played	EGY (Egypt)	FRA (France)	CAN (Canada)	HUN (Hungary)	USA (United States)	QAT (Qatar)	USA (United States)	USA (United States)	CAN (Canada)	USA (United States)	CAN (Canada)	CHN (China)	CZE (Czech Republic)	ENG (England)	MYS (Malaysia)	SGP (Singapore)	QAT (Qatar)	RSA (South Africa)	HKG (Hong Kong)	USA (United States)	USA (United States)	USA (United States)	USA (United States)	USA (United States)	QAT (Qatar)	CAN (Canada)	NZL (New Zealand)	AUS (Australia)	GER (Germany)	IND (India)	ENG (England)	Total Points
1	(Egypt) Ali Farag	8	2015	1820	DNP	DNP	DNP	1120	DNP	DNP	DNP	**2800**	DNP	DNP	DNP	DNP	DNP	**1800**	DNP	DNP	1820	DNP	**2800**	DNP	DNP	**1800**	DNP	DNP	DNP	DNP	DNP	DNP	DNP	15975
2	(Egypt) **Mostafa Asal**	8	**3100**	**2800**	DNP	DNP	DNP	1820	DNP	DNP	DNP	700	DNP	DNP	DNP	DNP	DNP	DNP	DNP	DNP	**2800**	DNP	1120	DNP	DNP	1170	DNP	DNP	DNP	DNP	DNP	DNP	**1800**	15310
3	(Peru) Diego Elías	8	1240	1120	DNP	DNP	DNP	**2800**	DNP	DNP	DNP	1820	DNP	DNP	DNP	DNP	DNP	1170	DNP	DNP	1120	DNP	1820	DNP	540	DNP	DNP	DNP	DNP	DNP	DNP	DNP	DNP	11630
4	(New Zealand) Paul Coll	11	775	1120	DNP	DNP	DNP	257	DNP	DNP	DNP	700	DNP	DNP	DNP	DNP	DNP	720	DNP	DNP	700	DNP	1120	**1350**	DNP	DNP	DNP	DNP	**1350**	1170	DNP	DNP	1170	10432
5	(Wales) Joel Makin	10	284	420	DNP	DNP	DNP	1120	DNP	**1800**	DNP	420	DNP	DNP	DNP	DNP	DNP	DNP	DNP	DNP	1120	DNP	700	DNP	**1350**	450	DNP	DNP	DNP	DNP	DNP	DNP	720	8384
6	(England) Mar. El Shorbagy	12	1240	257	DNP	DNP	DNP	257	**900**	720	DNP	DNP	DNP	337.5	DNP	DNP	DNP	DNP	DNP	DNP	420	**1350**	DNP	DNP	DNP	720	DNP	DNP	877.5	720	DNP	DNP	450	8249
7	(England) Mhd. El Shorbagy	12	775	700	DNP	DNP	DNP	257	DNP	450	DNP	700	DNP	**1350**	DNP	DNP	DNP	DNP	DNP	DNP	257	540	700	DNP	DNP	270	DNP	**900**	DNP	DNP	DNP	DNP	720	7619
8	(Egypt) Karim Gawad	11	284	700	DNP	DNP	DNP	700	DNP	450	DNP	257	DNP	DNP	DNP	DNP	DNP	DNP	DNP	DNP	420	540	257	DNP	DNP	DNP	**900**	DNP	DNP	**1800**	DNP	DNP	450	6758
9	(Egypt) Tarek Momen	10	775	700	DNP	DNP	DNP	700	DNP	270	DNP	420	DNP	DNP	DNP	DNP	DNP	DNP	**900**	DNP	700	877.5	700	DNP	DNP	DNP	585	DNP	DNP	DNP	DNP	DNP	DNP	6627.5
10	(Malaysia) Eain Yow	12	465	257	DNP	DNP	DNP	257	DNP	DNP	DNP	257	DNP	540	DNP	DNP	**900**	720	DNP	DNP	257	DNP	DNP	540	DNP	450	DNP	DNP	540	270	DNP	DNP	DNP	5453
11	(France) Victor Crouin	11	465	257	DNP	DNP	DNP	DNP	585	450	DNP	DNP	DNP	DNP	DNP	DNP	DNP	450	DNP	DNP	257	DNP	420	DNP	337.5	720	DNP	360	DNP	DNP	**900**	DNP	DNP	5201.5
12	(Egypt) Youssef Ibrahim	11	284	DNP	DNP	DNP	DNP	257	DNP	DNP	DNP	700	DNP	DNP	DNP	DNP	360	450	DNP	DNP	700	337.5	420	DNP	877.5	270	DNP	DNP	DNP	DNP	DNP	DNP	450	5106
13	(Egypt) Aly Abou Eleinen	10	465	257	DNP	DNP	DNP	257	DNP	720	DNP	1120	DNP	DNP	DNP	DNP	DNP	DNP	585	DNP	DNP	DNP	257	540	DNP	450	DNP	DNP	DNP	DNP	225	DNP	DNP	4876
14	(Egypt) Youssef Soliman	10	465	420	DNP	DNP	DNP	420	DNP	1170	DNP	420	DNP	DNP	DNP	DNP	585	DNP	DNP	DNP	DNP	DNP	257	DNP	540	270	DNP	DNP	DNP	270	DNP	DNP	DNP	4817
15	(Egypt) Fares Dessouky	10	465	257	DNP	DNP	DNP	700	DNP	DNP	DNP	420	DNP	337.5	DNP	DNP	DNP	270	DNP	DNP	420	DNP	420	DNP	DNP	DNP	360	DNP	DNP	DNP	585	DNP	DNP	4234.5
16	(Mexico) Leonel Cárdenas	11	284	420	DNP	DNP	DNP	257	DNP	DNP	325	DNP	**500**	DNP	DNP	DNP	DNP	DNP	DNP	DNP	257	202.5	257	877.5	DNP	DNP	DNP	585	DNP	DNP	225	DNP	DNP	4190

Bold – Players qualified for the final
(*) – Winners of Diamond's tournaments automatically qualifies for Finals.

Final tournament	Country	Location	Prize money	Date	2024–25 PSA Squash Tour Finals Champion
Men's PSA Squash Tour Finals	{{ }}	[[ ]], [[ ]]	$300,000	June 2025	[[ ]] (25x17px)

== Women's ==
=== Tournaments ===
Tournament	Country	Location	Rank	Prize money	Date	Winner
CIB Egyptian Open	Egypt	Giza	Diamond	$325,500	30 Aug–6 Sep. 2024	(Egypt) Nour El Sherbini
Paris Squash	France	Paris	Platinum	$213,000	15–21 September 2024	(Egypt) Nour El Sherbini
NASH Cup	Canada	London	Copper	$28,750	17–21 September 2024	(England) Katie Malliff
QTerminals Qatar Classic	Qatar	Doha	Platinum	$215,000	30 Sep.–5 Oct. 2024	(Egypt) Nour El Sherbini
Open Squash Classic	United States	New York City	Bronze	$56,380	6–10 October 2024	(Egypt) Farida Mohamed
Silicon Valley Open	United States	Redwood City	Gold	$122,000	11–16 October 2024	(United States) Olivia Weaver
The Hamilton Open	United States	Lancaster	Copper	$32,000	14–18 October 2024	(France) Mélissa Alves
Comcast Business U.S. Open	United States	Philadelphia	Platinum	$213,500	19–26 October 2024	(Egypt) Nouran Gohar
Canadian Women's Open	Canada	Toronto	Silver	$88,750	27–31 October 2024	(Belgium) Tinne Gilis
China Open	China	Shanghai	Silver	$89,000	30 Oct.–3 Nov. 2024	(Malaysia) Rachel Arnold
Monte Carlo Classic	Monaco	Fontvieille	Copper	$30,000	11–15 November 2024	(Wales) Tesni Murphy
ACE Malaysia Squash Cup	Malaysia	Petaling Jaya	Bronze	$64,000	12–17 November 2024	(Egypt) Amina Orfi
Chestnut Hill Classic	United States	Philadelphia	Bronze	$53,750	19–23 November 2024	(United States) Olivia Weaver
VITAGEN Singapore Squash Open	Singapore	Kallang	Gold	$120,000	19–24 November 2024	(Egypt) Amina Orfi
Cape Town Squash Open	South Africa	Cape Town	Copper	$25,000	26–30 November 2024	(France) Mélissa Alves
Milwaukee Hong Kong Open	Hong Kong, China	Hong Kong	Platinum	$207,500	2–8 December 2024	(Egypt) Nouran Gohar
Squash In The Land	United States	Cleveland	Silver	$88,750	14–19 January 2025	(Japan) Satomi Watanabe
J.P. Morgan Tournament of Champions	United States	New York City	Platinum	$219,000	23–30 January 2025	(Egypt) Hania El Hammamy
Carol Weymuller Open	United States	New York City	Bronze	$53,750	29 Jan.–2 Feb. 2025	(Egypt) Fayrouz Aboelkheir
Cincinnati Gaynor Cup	United States	Cincinnati	Silver	$78,750	5–9 February 2025	(Malaysia) Sivasangari Subramaniam
Cotidie Texas Open	United States	Houston	Gold	$111,000	18–23 February 2025	(Egypt) Nouran Gohar
New Zealand Open	New Zealand	Christchurch	Silver	$93,000	4–9 March 2025	(Egypt) Amina Orfi
Richardson Wealth Women's PSA Open	Canada	Vancouver	Copper	$28,750	5–9 March 2025	(France) Mélissa Alves
Easy Times Brewing Australian Open	Australia	Brisbane	Gold	$120,000	11–16 March 2025	(United States) Olivia Weaver
Calgary CFO PSA Women's Squash Week	Canada	Calgary	Copper	$28,750	12–16 March 2025	(England) Jasmine Hutton
German Open	Germany	Hamburg	Bronze	$60,500	19–23 March 2025	(United States) Amanda Sobhy
Spanish Open	Spain	Madrid	Copper	$35,000	25–29 March 2025	(Egypt) Zeina Mickawy
OptAsia Championships	England	Wimbledon	Gold	$118,000	25–30 March 2025	(Egypt) Hania El Hammamy
Manchester Open	England	Manchester	Bronze	$66,500	2–6 April 2025	(Egypt) Salma Hany
El Gouna International	Egypt	El Gouna	Platinum	$217,500	12–18 April 2025	(Egypt) Nouran Gohar
Grasshopper Cup	Switzerland	Zurich	Gold	$123,000	22–27 April 2025	(Egypt) Nouran Gohar
Squash on Fire Open	United States	Washington, D.C.	Bronze	$58,750	23–27 April 2025	(United States) Amanda Sobhy
Richmond Open	United States	Richmond	Copper	$28,750	29 Apr.–3 May 2025	[[ ]]
IQUW Bermuda Open	Bermuda	Devonshire	Copper	$28,750	29 Apr.–3 May 2025	[[ ]]

=== Standings ===
World Championship
196	1st Round	321	2nd Round
525	3rd Round	875	Quarterfinalist
1400	Semifinalist	2275	Runner-up
**3500**	Winner		

Diamond
173.5	1st Round	284	2nd Round
465	3rd Round	775	Quarterfinalist
1240	Semifinalist	2015	Runner-up
**3100**	Winner		

Platinum
257	1st Round	420	2nd Round
700	Quarterfinalist	1120	Semifinalist
1820	Runner-up	**2800**	Winner

Gold
165	1st Round	270	2nd Round
450	Quarterfinalist	720	Semifinalist
1170	Runner-up	**1800**	Winner

Silver
124	1st Round	202.5	2nd Round
337.5	Quarterfinalist	540	Semifinalist
877.5	Runner-up	**1350**	Winner

Bronze
82.5	1st Round	135	2nd Round
225	Quarterfinalist	360	Semifinalist
585	Runner-up	**900**	Winner

Copper
46	1st Round	75	2nd Round
125	Quarterfinalist	200	Semifinalist
325	Runner-up	**500**	Winner

Top 16 Women's PSA Squash Tour – World Events Standings 2024–25
Rank	Player	Tournaments Played	EGY (Egypt)	FRA (France)	CAN (Canada)	QAT (Qatar)	USA (United States)	USA (United States)	USA (United States)	USA (United States)	CAN (Canada)	CHN (China)	MON (Monaco)	MYS (Malaysia)	USA (United States)	SGP (Singapore)	RSA (South Africa)	HKG (Hong Kong)	USA (United States)	USA (United States)	USA (United States)	USA (United States)	USA (United States)	NZL (New Zealand)	CAN (Canada)	AUS (Australia)	CAN (Canada)	GER (Germany)	ESP (Spain)	ENG (England)	Total Points
1	(Egypt) Nouran Gohar	7	2015	1820	DNP	1820	DNP	DNP	DNP	**2800**	DNP	DNP	DNP	DNP	DNP	DNP	DNP	**2800**	DNP	1820	DNP	DNP	**1800**	DNP	DNP	DNP	DNP	DNP	DNP	DNP	14875
2	(Egypt) **Nour El Sherbini**	7	**3100**	**2800**	DNP	**2800**	DNP	DNP	DNP	1820	DNP	DNP	DNP	DNP	DNP	DNP	DNP	1820	DNP	1120	DNP	DNP	720	DNP	DNP	DNP	DNP	DNP	DNP	DNP	14180
3	(Egypt) Hania El Hammamy	9	1240	1120	DNP	1120	DNP	DNP	DNP	1120	DNP	DNP	DNP	DNP	DNP	1170	DNP	1120	DNP	**2800**	DNP	DNP	1170	DNP	DNP	DNP	DNP	DNP	DNP	**1800**	12660
4	(United States) Olivia Weaver	9	DNP	700	DNP	1120	DNP	**1800**	DNP	1120	DNP	DNP	DNP	DNP	**900**	DNP	DNP	1120	DNP	1120	DNP	540	DNP	DNP	DNP	**1800**	DNP	DNP	DNP	DNP	10220
5	(Egypt) Amina Orfi	10	465	DNP	DNP	700	DNP	720	DNP	257	DNP	DNP	DNP	**900**	DNP	**1800**	DNP	DNP	540	700	DNP	DNP	DNP	**1350**	DNP	1170	DNP	DNP	DNP	DNP	8602
6	(Belgium) Tinne Gilis	11	775	257	DNP	700	DNP	DNP	DNP	700	**1350**	DNP	DNP	DNP	DNP	720	DNP	700	DNP	700	DNP	DNP	720	337.5	DNP	720	DNP	DNP	DNP	DNP	7679.5
7	(Egypt) Rowan Elaraby	11	775	1120	DNP	257	DNP	DNP	DNP	700	DNP	337.5	DNP	DNP	DNP	DNP	DNP	700	540	700	DNP	DNP	450	540	DNP	720	DNP	DNP	DNP	DNP	6839.5
8	(United States) Amanda Sobhy	11	465	700	DNP	DNP	DNP	450	DNP	257	877.5	DNP	DNP	DNP	DNP	DNP	DNP	420	877.5	420	DNP	877.5	DNP	DNP	DNP	DNP	DNP	**900**	DNP	450	6694.5
9	(Malaysia) Sivasangari Subramaniam	11	465	420	DNP	DNP	DNP	720	DNP	DNP	DNP	540	DNP	585	DNP	720	DNP	420	DNP	257	DNP	**1350**	DNP	337.5	DNP	450	DNP	DNP	DNP	DNP	6264.5
10	(Japan) Satomi Watanabe	10	DNP	257	DNP	257	DNP	1170	DNP	420	DNP	DNP	DNP	DNP	DNP	DNP	DNP	420	**1350**	257	DNP	DNP	DNP	877.5	DNP	450	DNP	DNP	DNP	720	6178.5
11	(England) Georgina Kennedy	10	775	420	DNP	700	DNP	450	DNP	257	DNP	DNP	DNP	DNP	DNP	DNP	DNP	420	337.5	420	DNP	DNP	DNP	DNP	DNP	DNP	DNP	585	DNP	1170	5534.5
12	(Egypt) Nada Abbas	11	1240	257	DNP	420	225	DNP	DNP	DNP	337.5	DNP	DNP	DNP	DNP	DNP	DNP	DNP	337.5	420	585	DNP	450	DNP	DNP	DNP	DNP	360	DNP	720	5352
13	(Egypt) Sana Ibrahim	11	775	DNP	DNP	420	DNP	270	DNP	420	DNP	337.5	DNP	DNP	DNP	450	DNP	700	DNP	420	DNP	DNP	270	DNP	325	DNP	DNP	DNP	DNP	450	4837.5
14	(Egypt) Fayrouz Aboelkheir	10	465	700	DNP	420	DNP	DNP	DNP	700	DNP	DNP	DNP	DNP	DNP	450	DNP	257	DNP	257	**900**	337.5	DNP	DNP	DNP	270	DNP	DNP	DNP	DNP	4756.5
15	(Egypt) Farida Mohamed	10	284	420	DNP	257	**900**	450	DNP	DNP	DNP	877.5	DNP	DNP	DNP	DNP	DNP	DNP	337.5	257	360	DNP	450	DNP	DNP	DNP	DNP	DNP	DNP	DNP	4593
16	(Malaysia) Rachel Arnold	12	284	257	DNP	DNP	225	DNP	DNP	257	DNP	**1350**	DNP	360	DNP	DNP	DNP	257	DNP	257	225	337.5	DNP	337.5	DNP	270	DNP	DNP	DNP	DNP	4417

Bold – Players qualified for the final
(*) – Winners of Diamond's tournaments automatically qualifies for Finals.

Final tournament	Country	Location	Prize money	Date	2024–25 PSA Squash Tour Finals Champion
Women's PSA Squash Tour Finals	{{ }}	[[ ]], [[ ]]	$300,000	June 2025	[[ ]]

== See also ==
- 2024–25 PSA Squash Tour
- Official Men's Squash World Ranking
- Official Women's Squash World Ranking
