= Squash at the 2022 Commonwealth Games – Women's singles =

Boxing competitions

Squash – Women's singles at the 2022 Commonwealth Games
- Venue: University of Birmingham Hockey and Squash Centre
- Dates: July 29 – 3 August 2022
- Competitors: 39 from 21 nations

Medalists
gold medal	Georgina Kennedy	England
silver medal	Hollie Naughton	Canada
bronze medal	Sarah-Jane Perry	England

The women's singles squash competitions at the 2022 Commonwealth Games in Birmingham, England will take place between July 29 to August 3 at the University of Birmingham Hockey and Squash Centre. A total of 39 competitors from 21 nations took part.

== Schedule ==
The schedule is as follows:

Date	Round
Friday 29 July	Round of 64
Saturday 30 July	Round of 32
Sunday 31 July	Round of 16
Monday 1 August	Quarter-finals
Tuesday 2 August	Semi-finals
Wednesday 3 August	Medal matches

== Seeds ==
The seeds for the competition were revealed on July 19, 2022.

1. Joelle King (NZL) (semifinals)
2. Sarah-Jane Perry (ENG) (bronze medalist)
3. Georgina Kennedy (ENG) (gold medalist)
4. Joshna Chinappa (IND) (quarterfinals)
5. Tesni Evans (WAL) (round of 16)
6. Hollie Naughton (CAN) (silver medalist)
7. Emily Whitlock (WAL) (quarterfinals)
8. Lucy Turmel (ENG) (quarterfinals)
9. Aifa Azman (MAS) (round of 16)
10. Lisa Aitken (SCO) (withdrew)
11. Rachel Arnold (MAS) (quarterfinals)
12. Donna Lobban (AUS) (round of 16)
13. Nicole Bunyan (CAN) (round of 16)
14. Georgia Adderley (SCO) (round of 16)
15. Chan Yiwen (MAS) (round of 16)
16. Jess Turnbull (AUS) (round of 16)

== Results ==
The draw is as follows:

=== Finals ===
Quarterfinals
1	Joelle King (NZL)	9	18	11	14
8	Lucy Turmel (ENG)	11	16	9	12
6	Hollie Naughton (CAN)	11	11	15
4	Joshna Chinappa (IND)	9	5	13
3	Georgina Kennedy (ENG)	11	11	11
11	Rachel Arnold (MAS)	4	2	1
7	Emily Whitlock (WAL)	6	6	6
2	Sarah-Jane Perry (ENG)	11	11	11

Semifinals
1	Joelle King (NZL)	11	3	8	1
6	Hollie Naughton (CAN)	7	11	11	11
3	Georgina Kennedy (ENG)	11	8	11	14
2	Sarah-Jane Perry (ENG)	6	11	5	12

Gold medal match
6	Hollie Naughton (CAN)	7	5	14	5
3	Georgina Kennedy (ENG)	11	11	12	11
Bronze medal match
1	Joelle King (NZL)	11	11	8	6	12
2	Sarah-Jane Perry (ENG)	6	9	11	11	14

=== Top half ===
==== Section 1 ====
Round of 64
Leungo Katse (BOT)	11	11	11
Zulema Chisenga (ZAM)	9	4	9

Round of 32
1	Joelle King (NZL)	11	11	11
Leungo Katse (BOT)	1	4	3
Emma Keane (BER)	1	3	1
14	Georgia Adderley (SCO)	11	11	11
16	Jess Turnbull (AUS)	11	3	11	11
Colette Sultana (MLT)	4	11	7	7
Amity Alarcos (PNG)	5	1	1
8	Lucy Turmel (ENG)	11	11	11

Round of 16
1	Joelle King (NZL)	11	11	11
14	Georgia Adderley (SCO)	3	5	5
16	Jess Turnbul (AUS)	1	11	11	4
8	Lucy Turmel (ENG)	11	13	9	11

Quarterfinals
1	Joelle King (NZL)	9	18	11	14
8	Lucy Turmel (ENG)	11	16	9	12

==== Section 2 ====
Round of 64
Lijana Sultana (MLT)	9	11	11	7	12
Charlotte Knaggs (TTO)	11	3	3	11	10
Khaaliqa Nimji (KEN)	1	0	0
Meagen Best (BAR)	11	11	11

Round of 32
6	Hollie Naughton (CAN)	11	11	11
Lijana Sultana (MLT)	2	1	2
Sunayna Kuruvilla (IND)	8	7	7
9	Aifa Azman (MAS)	11	11	11
Kaitlyn Watts (NZL)	11	11	11
Marry Fung-A-Fat (GUY)	2	6	4
Meagen Best (BAR)	8	9	10
4	Joshna Chinappa (IND)	11	11	12

Round of 16
6	Hollie Naughton (CAN)	11	11	16
9	Aifa Azman (MAS)	6	7	14
Kaitlyn Watts (NZL)	8	11	4	6
4	Joshna Chinappa (IND)	11	9	11	11

Quarterfinals
6	Hollie Naughton (CAN)	11	11	15
4	Joshna Chinappa (IND)	9	5	13

=== Bottom half ===
==== Section 3 ====
Round of 64
Ashley Khalil (GUY)	4	9	11	11	4
Yeheni Kuruppu (SRI)	11	11	9	3	11
Naomi Neo Phatsima (BOT)	3	3	9
Amanda Haywood (BAR)	11	11	11

Round of 32
3	Georgina Kennedy (ENG)	11	11	11
Yeheni Kuruppu (SRI)	1	1	1
Chanithma Sinaly (SRI)	1	8	4
13	Nicole Bunyan (CAN)	11	11	11
11	Rachel Arnold (MAS)	11	11	11
Amna Fayyaz (PAK)	3	2	5
Amanda Haywood (BAR)	5	3	2
5	Tesni Evans (WAL)	11	11	11

Round of 16
3	Georgina Kennedy (ENG)	11	11	11
13	Nicole Bunyan (CAN)	3	1	3
11	Rachel Arnold (MAS)	19	11	11
5	Tesni Evans (WAL)	17	7	7

Quarterfinals
3	Georgina Kennedy (ENG)	11	11	11
11	Rachel Arnold (MAS)	4	2	1

==== Section 4 ====
Round of 64
Anahat Singh (IND)	11	11	11
Jada Ross (SVG)	5	2	0
Jade Pitcairn (CAY)	11	11	11
Jada Smith-Padmore (BAR)	5	5	2

Round of 32
7	Emily Whitlock (WAL)	11	11	4	11
Anahat Singh (IND)	7	7	11	6
Rachael Grinham (AUS)	11	4	7	7
12	Donna Lobban (AUS)	6	11	11	11
15	Chan Yiwen (MAS)	11	11	11
Faiza Zafar (PAK)	3	6	5
Jade Pitcairn (CAY)	1	3	5
2	Sarah-Jane Perry (ENG)	11	11	11

Round of 16
7	Emily Whitlock (WAL)	13	11	11
12	Donna Lobban (AUS)	11	7	3
15	Chan Yiwen (MAS)	6	8	11
2	Sarah-Jane Perry (ENG)	11	11	13

Quarterfinals
7	Emily Whitlock (WAL)	6	6	6
2	Sarah-Jane Perry (ENG)	11	11	11
