= Squash at the 2022 Commonwealth Games – Women's doubles =

Boxing competitions

Squash – Women's doubles at the 2022 Commonwealth Games
- Venue: University of Birmingham Hockey and Squash Centre
- Dates: 4–8 August 2022
- Competitors: 38 from 14 nations

Medalists
gold medal	Joelle King; Amanda Landers-Murphy	New Zealand
silver medal	Sarah-Jane Perry; Alison Waters	England
bronze medal	Rachel Arnold; Aifa Azman	Malaysia

The Women's doubles squash competitions at the 2022 Commonwealth Games in Birmingham, England took place between August 4 and 8 at the University of Birmingham Hockey and Squash Centre. A total of 38 competitors from 14 nations took part.

== Schedule ==
The schedule was as follows:

Date	Round
Thursday 4 August	Round of 32
Thursday 4 August	Round of 16
Friday 5 August	Quarter-finals
Sunday 7 August	Semi-finals
Monday 8 August	Medal matches

== Results ==
The draw is as follows:

=== Finals ===
Semifinals
Chan Yiwen (MAS); Ainaa Ampandi (MAS)	9	7
Joelle King (NZL); Amanda Landers-Murphy (NZL)	11	11
Rachel Arnold (MAS); Aifa Azman (MAS)	11	6	9
Sarah-Jane Perry (ENG); Alison Waters (ENG)	8	11	11

Gold medal match
Joelle King (NZL); Amanda Landers-Murphy (NZL)	11	11
Sarah-Jane Perry (ENG); Alison Waters (ENG)	8	8
Bronze medal match
Chan Yiwen (MAS); Ainaa Ampandi (MAS)	3	9
Rachel Arnold (MAS); Aifa Azman (MAS)	11	11

=== Top half ===
Round of 32
Amanda Haywood (BAR); Meagan Best (BAR)	8	11	11
Lijana Sultana (MLT); Colette Sultana (MLT)	11	10	10

Round of 16
Joshna Chinappa (IND); Dipika Pallikal (IND)	11	11
Amanda Haywood (BAR); Meagan Best (BAR)	4	4
Nicole Bunyan (CAN); Hollie Naughton (CAN)	4	3
Chan Yiwen (MAS); Ainaa Ampandi (MAS)	11	11
Georgina Kennedy (ENG); Lucy Turmel (ENG)	11	11
Alex Haydon (AUS); Jessica Turnbull (AUS)	4	7
Mary Fung-A-Fat (GUY); Ashley Khalil (GUY)	3	8
Joelle King (NZL); Amanda Landers-Murphy (NZL)	11	11

Quarterfinals
Joshna Chinappa (IND); Dipika Pallikal (IND)	2	7
Chan Yiwen (MAS); Ainaa Ampandi (MAS)	11	11
Georgina Kennedy (ENG); Lucy Turmel (ENG)	8	6
Joelle King (NZL); Amanda Landers-Murphy (NZL)	11	11

Semifinals
Chan Yiwen (MAS); Ainaa Ampandi (MAS)	9	7
Joelle King (NZL); Amanda Landers-Murphy (NZL)	11	11

=== Bottom half ===
Round of 32
Sunayna Kuruvilla (IND); Anahat Singh (IND)	11	11
Yeheni Kuruppu (SRI); Chanithma Sinaly (SRI)	9	4
Leungo Katse (BOT); Naomi Phatsima (BOT)	5	6
Marlene West (CAY); Jade Pitcairn (CAY)	11	11

Round of 16
Donna Lobban (AUS); Rachael Grinham (AUS)	11	11
Sunayna Kuruvilla (IND); Anahat Singh (IND)	4	4
Amna Fayyaz (PAK); Faiza Zafar (PAK)	7	6
Rachel Arnold (MAS); Aifa Azman (MAS)	11	11
Lisa Aitken (SCO); Georgia Adderley (SCO)	11	11
Abbie Palmer (NZL); Kaitlyn Watts (NZL)	1	3
Marlene West (CAY); Jade Pitcairn (CAY)	3	2
Sarah-Jane Perry (ENG); Alison Waters (ENG)	11	11

Quarterfinals
Donna Lobban (AUS); Rachael Grinham (AUS)	9	11	10
Rachel Arnold (MAS); Aifa Azman (MAS)	11	4	11
Lisa Aitken (SCO); Georgia Adderley (SCO)	7	8
Sarah-Jane Perry (ENG); Alison Waters (ENG)	11	11

Semifinals
Rachel Arnold (MAS); Aifa Azman (MAS)	11	6	9
Sarah-Jane Perry (ENG); Alison Waters (ENG)	8	11	11
