= Men's El Gouna International 2021 =

El Gouna International 2021
- 10th El Gouna International

Details
- Event name: El Gouna International Squash Open 2021
- Location: El Gouna Egypt
- Venue: Abu Tig Marina
- Website www.elgounasquashopen.com

Men's Winner
- Category: World Tour
- Prize money: $181,500
- Year: 2021

The El Gouna International 2021 is the men's edition of the 2021 El Gouna International, which is a PSA World Tour event part of the 2020–21 PSA World Tour. The event will take place in Abu Tig Marina at El Gouna, Egypt from 20 May to 28 May. Mohamed El Shorbagy from Egypt is the champion for this tournament with Paul Coll from New Zealand being the runner-up.

== Prize money and ranking points ==
For the 2021 event, the prize money is $181,500. The prize money and points breakdown is as follows:

Prize money El Gouna International (2021)
Event	W	F	SF	QF	3R	2R	1R
Points (PSA)	2750	1810	1100	675	410	250	152.5

== Seeds ==
1. (Egypt) Mohamed El Shorbagy (champion)
2. (Egypt) Tarek Momen (semi-finals)
3. (New Zealand) Paul Coll (runner-up)
4. (Egypt) Marwan El Shorbagy (second round)
5. (Egypt) Karim Abdel Gawad (quarter-finals)
6. (Egypt) Fares Dessouky (semi-finals)
7. (Wales) Joel Makin (quarter-finals)
8. (Colombia) Miguel Rodríguez (second round)

== Draw and results ==
=== Finals ===
Semi finals
1	(Egypt) M El Shorbagy	11	11	8	11
6	(Egypt) F Dessouky	6	9	11	6
3	(New Zealand) P Coll	11	11	11
2	(Egypt) T Momen	9	6	7

Final
1	(Egypt) M El Shorbagy	11	11	11
3	(New Zealand) P Coll	5	2	7

=== Top half ===
==== Section 1 ====
First round
1	(Egypt) M El Shorbagy
Bye
(Scotland) G Lobban
Bye
(England) G Parker	7	8	5
(United States) T Harrity	11	11	11
(Spain) E L Möller	9	11	7	10
(France) B Masotti	11	9	11	12
(Egypt) Y Ibrahim	11	11	11
(Egypt) R Baddour	6	2	4
(Mexico) L Cárdenas	6	9	4
(Malaysia) Eain Y N	11	11	11
(England) A Waller
Bye
7	(Wales) J Makin
Bye

Second round
1	(Egypt) M El Shorbagy	11	11	12
(Scotland) G Lobban	7	3	10
(United States) T Harrity	6	7	6
(France) B Masotti	11	11	11
(Egypt) Y Ibrahim	11	11	11
(Malaysia) Eain Y N	5	7	7
(England) A Waller	9	4	5
7	(Wales) J Makin	11	11	11

Third Round
1	(Egypt) M El Shorbagy	10	11	11	11
(France) B Masotti	'12	7	8	4
(Egypt) Y Ibrahim	10	7	2
7	(Wales) J Makin	12	11	11

Quarter finals
1	(Egypt) M El Shorbagy	13	11	6	9	11
7	(Wales) J Makin	11	3	11	11	7

==== Section 2 ====
First round
6	(Egypt) F Dessouky
Bye
(England) N Lake	6	11	8	6
(France) G Gaultier	11	7	11	11
(England) D James	8	5	11	9
(England) P Rooney	11	11	9	11
(Switzerland) D Steinmann	13	8
(Spain) B Golán	11	9^{r}
(India) S Ghosal
Bye
(Egypt) M Asal
Bye
(Egypt) M Abouelghar
Bye
4	(Egypt) M E Shorgaby
Bye

Second round
6	(Egypt) F Dessouky	11	11	7	11
(France) G Gaultier	5	9	11	3
(England) P Rooney	11	11	8	11
(Switzerland) D Steinmann	7	8	11	4
(India) S Ghosal	2	9	6
(Egypt) M Asal	11	11	11
(Egypt) M Abouelghar	8	11	11	11	11
4	(Egypt) M E Shorgaby	11	3	13	5	3

Third Round
6	(Egypt) F Dessouky	4	11	11	11
(England) P Rooney	11	4	8	3
(Egypt) M Asal	12	4	14	1	12
(Egypt) M Abouelghar	10	11	12	11	10

Quarter finals
6	(Egypt) F Dessouky	10	8	11	11	11
(Egypt) M Asal	12	11	2	4	9

=== Bottom half ===
==== Section 3 ====
First round
3	(New Zealand) P Coll
Bye
(Egypt) A A Eleinen	10	12	11	8
(Egypt) Y Soliman	12	14	3	11
(Scotland) A Clyne	11	8	7	9
(United States) S Khan	9	11	11	11
(France) A Dussord	9	11	4	11	7
(France) V Crouin	11	9	11	7	11
(Qatar) A Al-Tamimi	6	11	4	5
(Egypt) K E Hammamy	11	9	11	11
(Egypt) Z Salem
Bye
(Egypt) M EISherbini	12	13	11	11
(England) R Fallows	14	11	7	7
5	(Egypt) K A Gawad
Bye

Second round
3	(New Zealand) P Coll	11	11	11
(Egypt) Y Soliman	3	8	8
(United States) S Khan	10	8	4
(France) V Crouin	12	11	11
(Egypt) K E Hammamy	11	13	11
(Egypt) Z Salem	6	11	7
(Egypt) M EISherbini	9	10	11	7
5	(Egypt) K A Gawad	11	12	6	11

Third Round
3	(New Zealand) P Coll	11	11	12
(France) V Crouin	7	3	10
(Egypt) K E Hammamy	6	13	6
5	(Egypt) K A Gawad	11	15	11

Quarter finals
3	(New Zealand) P Coll	2	11	11	11
5	(Egypt) K A Gawad	11	8	4	2

==== Section 4 ====
First round
8	(Colombia) M A Rodríguez
Bye
(France) G Marche
Bye
(Germany) R Kandra	5	11	11	5	11
(India) M Magaonkar	11	9	8	11	3
(India) V Malhotra	11	4	6	7
(France) L Serme	9	11	11	11
(Egypt) M Hesham
Bye
(Egypt) M Gamal	11	6	12
(Switzerland) N Müller	13	11	14
(Spain) I P Bernabeu	11	11	11
(India) A Jagtag	9	7	7
2	(Egypt) T Momen
Bye

Second round
8	(Colombia) M A Rodríguez	7	12	4
(France) G Marche	11	14	11
(Germany) R Kandra	11	11	11
(France) L Serme	6	9	4
(Egypt) M Hesham	7	11	11	3	15
(Switzerland) N Müller	11	7	8	11	13
(Spain) I P Bernabeu	5	8	6
2	(Egypt) T Momen	11	11	11

Third Round
(France) G Marche	6	11	11	11
(Germany) R Kandra	11	3	9	9
(Egypt) M Hesham	10	8	4
2	(Egypt) T Momen	12	11	11

Quarter finals
(France) G Marche	5	5	4
2	(Egypt) T Momen	11	11	11

== See also ==
- Women's El Gouna International 2021
- El Gouna International

Preceded by United States (Chicago); 2018–19	Men's El Gouna International 2021; El Gouna (Egypt); 2020-21	Succeeded by TBA; 2021
