= 2021 Men's Egyptian Squash Open =

Egyptian Squash Open
- Men's Egyptian Open

Details
- Event name: 2021 CIB Egyptian Open
- Location: Cairo, Egypt
- Venue: New Giza Sporting Club and Giza pyramid complex
- Dates: 10-17 September 2021
- Website cibegyptiansquashopen.net

Men's Winner
- Prize money: $295,000
- Year: 2021–22 PSA World Tour

The Men's 2021 CIB Egyptian Open is the men's edition of the 2021 CIB Egyptian Open, which is a 2021–22 PSA World Tour event. The event will take place in Cairo, Egypt between 10 and 17 September, 2021. The event's main sponsor is the Commercial International Bank of Egypt.

Egypt's Ali Farag defeated fellow countryman Mohamed El Shorbagy in the final, winning the tournament for the second time.

== Seeds ==
1. (Egypt) Mohamed El Shorbagy (runner-up)
2. (Egypt) Ali Farag (champion)
3. (Egypt) Tarek Momen (semi-finals)
4. (New Zealand) Paul Coll (semi-finals)
5. (Egypt) Marwan Elshorbagy (quarter-finals)
6. (Egypt) Karim Abdel Gawad (third round)
7. (Egypt) Fares Dessouky (second round)
8. (Egypt) Mostafa Asal (second round)

== Draw and results ==
=== Semi-finals and final ===
Semi-finals
1	(Egypt) Mohamed El Shorbagy	11	11	11
3	(Egypt) Tarek Momen	6	3	8
4	(New Zealand) Paul Coll	9	12	4	9
2	(Egypt) Ali Farag	11	10	11	11

Final
1	(Egypt) Mohamed El Shorbagy	11	11	2	6	5
2	(Egypt) Ali Farag	6	9	11	11	11

=== Main Draw ===
==== Top half ====
First round
1	(Egypt) Mohamed El Shorbagy
[Bye]
(Egypt) Ibrahim Elkabbani	8	3	6
(France) Baptiste Masotti	11	11	11
(Egypt) Karim El Hammamy	9	11	11	11
(Jamaica) Christopher Binnie	11	8	6	2
(Spain) Bernat Jaume	11	5	5
(Scotland) Greg Lobban	13	11	11
(Mexico) Arturo Salazar	12	10	11	13
(Hong Kong) Max Lee	10	12	4	11
(Colombia) Miguel Rodriguez
[Bye]
(Malaysia) Eain Yow Ng
[Bye]
8	(Egypt) Mostafa Asal
[Bye]
7	(Egypt) Fares Dessouky
[Bye]
(Egypt) Mazen Gamal	7	10	6
(United States) Shahjahan Khan	11	12	11
(Egypt) Zahed Salem
[Bye]
(Hong Kong) Henry Leung	11	8	9	11	9
(Mexico) Cesar Salazar	9	11	11	4	11
(United States) Todd Harrity	11	11	9	11
(Qatar) Syed Azlan Amjad	3	5	11	3
(Hong Kong) Tsz Kwan Lau	5	8	11	13	10
(Spain) Iker Pajares Bernabeu	11	11	9	11	12
(Egypt) Youssef Soliman	6	4	11	11	11
(France) Auguste Dussourd	11	11	1	3	8
3	(Egypt) Tarek Momen
[Bye]

Second round
1	(Egypt) Mohamed El Shorbagy	11	11	11
(France) Baptiste Masotti	7	8	8
(Egypt) Karim El Hammamy	9	11	8	11	11
(Scotland) Greg Lobban	11	6	11	2	5
(Mexico) Arturo Salazar	8	11	5	6
(Colombia) Miguel Rodriguez	11	8	11	11
(Malaysia) Eain Yow Ng	11	11	11
8	(Egypt) Mostafa Asal	8	5	8
7	(Egypt) Fares Dessouky	12	11	10	1^{r}
(United States) Shahjahan Khan	10	9	12	4
(Egypt) Zahed Salem	11	14	11
(Mexico) Cesar Salazar	6	12	6
(United States) Todd Harrity	9	10	12
(Spain) Iker Pajares Bernabeu	11	12	14
(Egypt) Youssef Soliman	11	2	7	5
3	(Egypt) Tarek Momen	5	11	11	11

Third round
1	(Egypt) Mohamed El Shorbagy	11	11	11
(Egypt) Karim El Hammamy	8	4	9
(Colombia) Miguel Rodriguez	11	5	9	11	10
(Malaysia) Eain Yow Ng	5	11	11	7	12
(United States) Shahjahan Khan	13	5	1	7
(Egypt) Zahed Salem	11	11	11	11
(Spain) Iker Pajares Bernabeu	6	1	2
3	(Egypt) Tarek Momen	11	11	11

Quarter-finals
1	(Egypt) Mohamed El Shorbagy	11	11	11
(Malaysia) Eain Yow Ng	2	7	8
Semi-finals
1	(Egypt) Mohamed El Shorbagy	11	11	11
3	(Egypt) Tarek Momen	6	3	8
(Egypt) Zahed Salem	12	4	5	2
3	(Egypt) Tarek Momen	10	11	11	11

==== Bottom half ====
First round
4	(New Zealand) Paul Coll
[Bye]
(Japan) Ryosei Kobayashi	7	2	9
(Germany) Raphael Kandra	11	11	11
(France) Mathieu Castagnet	8	11	11	11
(Switzerland) Dimitri Steinmann	11	8	5	6
(Egypt) Mohamed Abouelghar
[Bye]
(France) Lucas Serme	11	11	3	15
(France) Sebastien Bonmalais	7	8	11	13
(India) Ramit Tandon	11	11	11
(Spain) Borja Golan	7	7	7
(Egypt) Omar Mosaad
[Bye]
5	(Egypt) Marwan Elshorbagy
[Bye]
6	(Egypt) Karim Abdel Gawad
[Bye]
(India) Saurav Ghosal
[Bye]
(Pakistan) Tayyab Aslam	11	1	4	8
(Egypt) Yahya Elnawasany	9	11	11	11
(Egypt) Mazen Hesham
[Bye]
(Egypt) Mohamed ElSherbini	11	11	11	12
(United States) Faraz Khan	7	9	13	10
(Czech Republic) Martin Svec	12	2	5
(Qatar) Abdulla Mohd Al Tamimi	14	11	11
(France) Gregoire Marche
[Bye]
2	(Egypt) Ali Farag
[Bye]

Second round
4	(New Zealand) Paul Coll	11	11	11
(Germany) Raphael Kandra	8	5	6
(France) Mathieu Castagnet	9	8	8
(Egypt) Mohamed Abouelghar	11	11	11
(France) Lucas Serme	12	6	6	6
(India) Ramit Tandon	10	11	11	11
(Egypt) Omar Mosaad	8	7	8
5	(Egypt) Marwan Elshorbagy	11	11	11
6	(Egypt) Karim Abdel Gawad	10	12	13	13	11
(India) Saurav Ghosal	12	10	11	15	4
(Egypt) Yahya Elnawasany	9	3	11	10
(Egypt) Mazen Hesham	11	11	1	12
(Egypt) Mohamed ElSherbini	8	4
(Qatar) Abdulla Mohd Al Tamimi	11	4^{r}
(France) Gregoire Marche	8	6	6
2	(Egypt) Ali Farag	11	11	11

Third round
4	(New Zealand) Paul Coll	11	9	11	5	11
(Egypt) Mohamed Abouelghar	9	11	7	11	5
(India) Ramit Tandon	6	9	8
5	(Egypt) Marwan Elshorbagy	11	11	11
6	(Egypt) Karim Abdel Gawad	11	5	9	11	6
(Egypt) Mazen Hesham	8	11	11	9	11
(Egypt) Mohamed ElSherbini	4	2	0^{r}
2	(Egypt) Ali Farag	11	11	2

Quarter-finals
4	(New Zealand) Paul Coll	11	11	11
5	(Egypt) Marwan Elshorbagy	7	9	3
Semi-finals
4	(New Zealand) Paul Coll	9	12	4	9
2	(Egypt) Ali Farag	11	10	11	11
(Egypt) Mazen Hesham	6	7	10
2	(Egypt) Ali Farag	11	11	12

== See also ==
- 2021 Women's Egyptian Squash Open
