= Alex Haydon =

Australian squash player (born 2001)

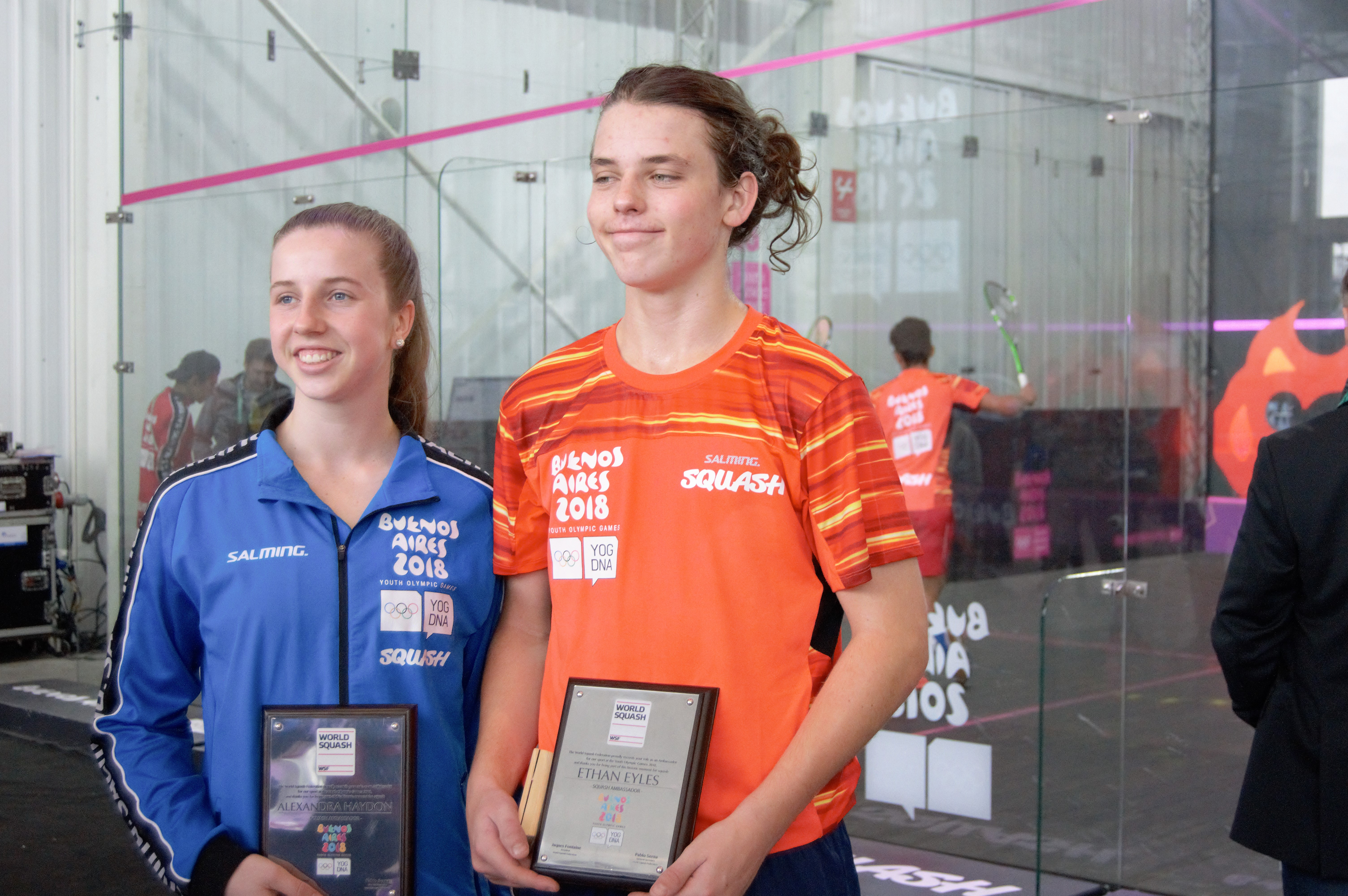
- Alex Haydon at the 2018 Summer Youth Olympics (left)

Personal information
- Born: 25 July 2001 (age 25) Clare Valley, South Australia, Australia
- Height: 168 cm (5 ft 6 in)
- Weight: 62 kg (137 lb)

Sport
- Country: Australia
- Racquet used: Salming
- Highest ranking: 67 (July 29, 2024)
- Current ranking: 73 (September 2024)

Alex Haydon also known as Alexandra Haydon (born 25 July 2001) is an Australian professional squash player. She made her maiden Commonwealth Games appearance representing Australia at the 2022 Commonwealth Games. She has won the Australian National Junior Squash Championships on seven occasions with all of them being on a consecutive basis from 2013 to 2019. She achieved her highest career PSA world rankings of 67 on 29 July 2024 during the 2023–24 PSA World Tour.

== Early life ==
She was born and grew up in the Clare Valley, South Australia.

== Career ==
She began playing the sport of squash at the age of eight in the Clare Squash Club and her interest in squash emerged as a result of the support she received from her parents and her entire family. She relocated to Adelaide as a junior and eventually joined the Squash Australia's Junior Development Squad. She won her first Junior National Championship title in 2013 and rose to prominence within a year by making it to the Australian team for both the Oceania Junior Championships and Trans-Tasman Test Series at the age of twelve. She retained her national junior championship title at the 2014 Junior National Championship and later repeated the feat in 2015, 2016, 2017, 2018 and 2019 before ageing out of the junior competition. She turned professional in 2018 by joining the Professional Squash Association.

She competed at the 2015 Commonwealth Youth Games which also marked her debut appearance at the Commonwealth Youth Games. She competed at the 2016 Women's World Junior Squash Championships, 2017 Women's World Junior Squash Championships and 2018 Women's World Junior Squash Championships. She was a member of the Australian squad which finished at ninth position at the 2018 Women's World Team Squash Championships. She also made her maiden Summer Youth Olympics appearance representing Australia at the 2018 Summer Youth Olympics.

She was part of the Australian squad which competed at the 2019 Women's World Junior Team Squash Championships where Australia finished eighth on the overall final standings. After graduating from the high school, she then moved to the Gold Coast, Queensland in 2019 to train at the National Squash Centre where she was coached by national head coach and former Australian national player Stewart Boswell. She also participated at the 2019 Women's World Junior Squash Championships and also competed at the 2019 Women's World Doubles Squash Championships. She emerged as runners-up to Tamika Hunt in the women's closed PSA category in the final of the 2021 Australian National Championships. She claimed bronze medal alongside Zac Alexander in the mixed event at the 2019 World Doubles Squash Championships.

In January 2022, she won the 2022 Australian Women's Doubles Open title alongside Rachael Grinham. A week following her triumph at the Australian Open, she emerged victorious in the women's open singles at the 2022 Gold Coast PSA Open. She was also a member of the Australian squad which secured an eleventh place finish at the 2022 Women's World Team Squash Championships. She competed in the women's singles event at the 2022 World Games. She also toured overseas to train and play on the Professional Squash Association (PSA) Challenger Tour just prior to the Birmingham Commonwealth Games. She also made it to the Australian squad for the 2022 WSF World Doubles Championships which was held in Glasgow. She paired alongside Jessica Turnbull and competed in the women's doubles event at the 2022 Commonwealth Games where the duo reached Round of 16 before being eliminated by English pair Georgina Kennedy and Lucy Turmel.

She is currently a member of the Squash Australia High Performance Program as well as the Squash SA ETS.
