= Yuna Loaëc =

French squash player (born 2001)

Personal information
- Born: 17 May 2001 (age 25) Poissy, France
- Height: 1.64 m (5 ft 5 in)
- Weight: 60 kg (132 lb)

Sport
- Country: France
- Retired: Active
- Racquet used: Technifibre

women's singles
- Highest ranking: 160 (May 2021)
- Current ranking: 160 (May 2021)
- Updated on 29 May 2021

Yuna Loaëc (born 17 May 2001) is a French professional squash player. She achieved her highest career PSA ranking of 160 in May 2021 during the 2020-21 PSA World Tour.
