= El Gouna International =

Squash tournament

Details
- Event name: El Gouna International Squash Open
- Location: El Gouna, Egypt
- Venue: Abu Tig Marina
- Website www.elgounasquashopen.com

Men's Winner
- Category: World Tour Platinum
- Prize money: $217,500 (2025) ("El Gouna International Squash Open 2025". PSA Squash Tour.)

The El Gouna International is an annual men's and women's squash tournament held in El Gouna, Egypt during April. It is part of the PSA World Series, the highest level of professional squash competition.

== History ==
The men's event was first held in 2010 while the women's event was first held in 2018.

The event has been dominated by Egyptian players, with only two players Grégory Gaultier of France and Diego Elias of Peru outside of Egypt winning the event in 2017 and 2026.

== Past winners ==
=== Men ===
Year	Winner	Runner-up	score
2010	(Egypt) Karim Darwish	(Egypt) Ramy Ashour	16–14, 11–3, 5–1 rtd
2011	No competition		
2012	(Egypt) Ramy Ashour	(England) James Willstrop	12–10, 11–5, 5–2 rtd
2013	No competition		
2014	(Egypt) Ramy Ashour	(Egypt) Mohamed El Shorbagy	11–7, 12–10, 8–11, 11–8
2015	(Egypt) Ramy Ashour	(Egypt) Mohamed El Shorbagy	11–9, 11–6, 4–11, 10–12, 12–10
2016	(Egypt) Mohamed El Shorbagy	(France) Grégory Gaultier	7–11, 9–11, 11–3, 11–9, 11–8
2017	(France) Grégory Gaultier	(Egypt) Karim Abdel Gawad	11–6, 11–8, 11–7
2018	(Egypt) Marwan El Shorbagy	(Egypt) Ali Farag	11–8, 11–5, 11–4
2019	(Egypt) Ali Farag	(Egypt) Karim Abdel Gawad	11–9, 12–10, 11–3
2020	Cancelled due to COVID-19 pandemic in Egypt		
2021	(Egypt) Mohamed El Shorbagy	(New Zealand) Paul Coll	11-5, 11-2, 11-7
2022	(Egypt) Mostafa Asal	(New Zealand) Paul Coll	11-8, 11-9, 11-5
2023	(Egypt) Ali Farag	(Egypt) Mostafa Asal	12-10, 10-12, 11-6, 11-2
2024	(Egypt) Ali Farag	(Egypt) Mostafa Asal	11-7, 8-11, 11-4, 11-5
2025	(Egypt) Mostafa Asal	(Egypt) Ali Farag	6–11, 7–11, 11–9, 11–9, 11–5
2026	(Peru) Diego Elias	(Egypt) Mohamad Zakaria	11–1, 11–7, 11–1

=== Men's champions by country ===
Champions		Runner-up	
Egypt	12	Egypt	10
France	1	New Zealand	2
Peru	1	England	1
England	0	France	1

=== Women ===
Year	Winner	Runner-up	score
2018	(Egypt) Raneem El Weleily	(Egypt) Nour El Sherbini	3–11, 12–10, 11–7, 11–5
2019	(Egypt) Raneem El Weleily	(Egypt) Nouran Gohar	11–8, 7–11, 12–10, 11–6
2020	Postponed due to COVID-19 pandemic in Egypt		
2021	(Egypt) Nour El Sherbini	(Egypt) Nouran Gohar	11-7, 11-8, 11-5
2022	(Egypt) Hania El Hammamy	(Egypt) Nouran Gohar	2-11, 4-11, 11-8, 11-9, 11-4
2023	(Egypt) Nouran Gohar	(Belgium) Nele Gilis	11-5, 11-7, 11-9
2024	(Egypt) Nouran Gohar	(Egypt) Nour El Sherbini	11-6, 11-13, 11-6, 11-6
2025	(Egypt) Nouran Gohar	(Egypt) Amina Orfi	9–11, 11–7, 11–6, 11–7
2026	(Egypt) Hania El Hammamy	(Egypt) Nour El Sherbini	11–7, 9–11, 8–11, 11–4, 11-9

=== Women's champions by country ===
Champions		Runner-up	
Egypt	8	Egypt	7
France	0	Belgium	1

== See also ==
- Squash in Egypt
- Alexandria International
