= Diya Joukani =

Indian fashion designer and influencer

- Born: 2000 or 2001 (age 25–26); Bandra, Mumbai, India
- Education: University of Auckland
- Occupations: Fashion designer; social media influencer

Diya Joukani is an Indian fashion designer and social media influencer. She is known for her brand, DiyaDiya. She is also known for her social media content, which led her to be described as "India's 'It' Girl" by The New York Times.

== Biography ==
Joukani was born and raised in Bandra, Mumbai. She is Sindhi. Her aunt was a fashion designer, and Joukani started altering her clothes at the age of 5, using rhinestones and swapping out uniform pieces. She faced discipline from her school for this.

She subsequently attended the University of Auckland in New Zealand for her college degree, where she played squash and wanted to work at the United Nations. She worked at vintage stores, then moved to the UK, where she worked as a stylist and at stores including Kenzo. She described the experience as "eating her soul".

In July 2024, after teaching herself to tailor through YouTube tutorials, she designed her first piece of clothing, a jacket, and after positive reception decided to move back to Mumbai that December and launch her first line. In July 2025, she began creating social media posts wearing clothing pieces she had designed, which went viral later that year and sparked a trend of similar videos by people from across the world.

On January 11, 2026, she launched her website, Diya's Duniya, meaning home, for her brand DiyaDiya, and immediately received 3,000 orders. The website features very casual discussions of her outfits meant to appear as just her talking to her audience. She subsequently built a team of tailors from Bandra to help her in making her designs. She also attended the Met Gala watch party in New York that year.

Her style emphasizes heavy use of traditional Indian embroidery and Sindhi beading and a streetwear aesthetic. She has described it as heavily inspired by the traditionally bedazzled Sindhi style. She has also described her designing as instinctive, sometimes coming from dreams.

Her social media usually features videos of herself as the model of her clothing walking around Mumbai, set to Nights by Frank Ocean, and has included a collaboration with Rihanna. Many of her reels include spontaneous appearances from locals. She is also known for her "cool girl walk" videos. Her reels are mostly filmed by her father. She has described her goal as "taking something from Mumbai all over the world".

She was named to the Time100 Next India in 2026, and won the Creative award in Vogue India's Forces of Fashion Awards that same year.
