= Iker Pajares Bernabeu =

Spanish squash player (born 1996)

Personal information
- Born: 22 March 1996 (age 30) Barcelona, Spain
- Height: 1.82 m (6 ft 0 in)
- Weight: 73 kg (161 lb)

Sport
- Country: Spain
- Turned pro: 2012
- Coached by: Victor Montserrat
- Retired: Active
- Racquet used: Unsquashable

Men's singles
- Highest ranking: No. 15 (February 2024)
- Current ranking: No. 31 (14 July 2025)
- Title: 8 titles
- Tour final: 11 finals

Iker Pajares Bernabeu (born 22 March 1996) is a professional squash player who represents Spain. He reached a career high ranking of 15 in the world during February 2024.

== Biography ==
In July 2025, he won his 12th PSA title after securing victory in the Valencia Open during the 2024–25 PSA Squash Tour.
