= Olivia Weaver =

American squash player

Olivia Weaver née Fietcher
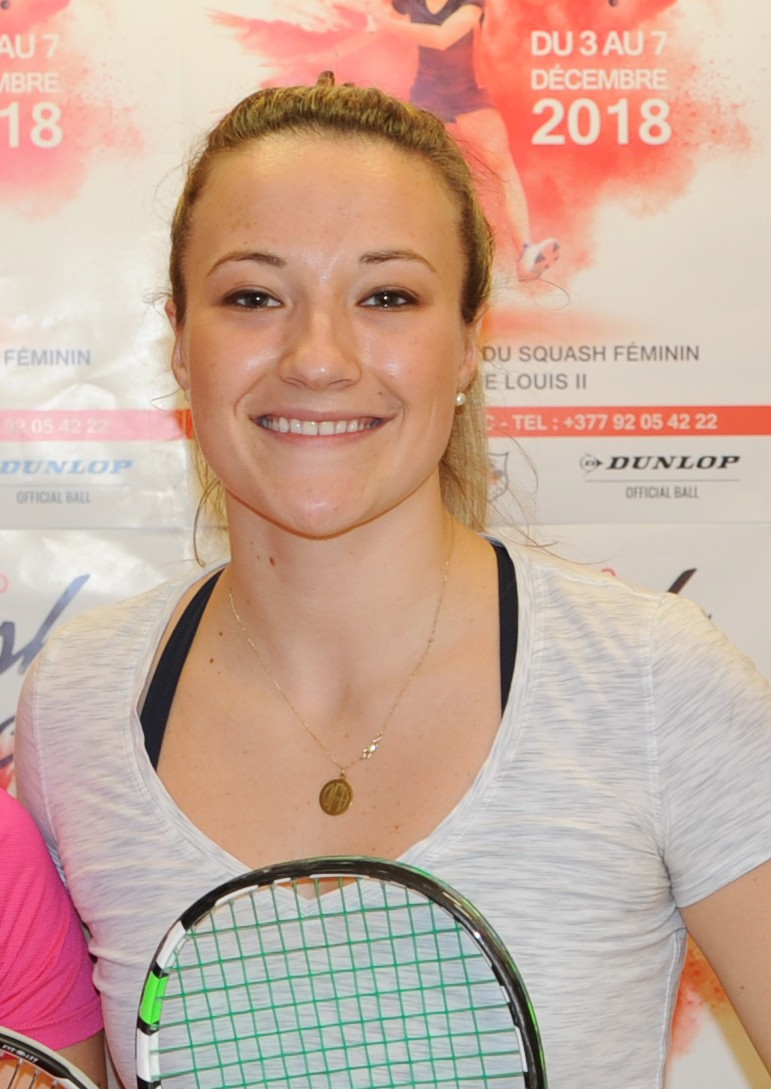
- Olivia Weaver, Monte Carlo Squash Classic 2018

Personal information
- Born: September 15, 1995 (age 30) Philadelphia, Pennsylvania, United States
- Height: 1.71 m (5 ft 7 in)
- Weight: 63 kg (139 lb)

Sport
- Country: United States
- Handedness: Right Handed
- Turned pro: 2018
- Coached by: Rodney Martin
- Retired: Active
- Racquet used: Head

Women's singles
- Highest ranking: No. 3 (February 2026)
- Current ranking: No. 3 (February 2026)
- Title: 12
Medal record
Representing United States
World Championships
Bronze medal – third place	2024 Cairo	Singles
Bronze medal – third place	2025 Chicago	Singles
World Team Championships
Silver medal – second place	2022 Cairo	Team
Silver medal – second place	2024 Hong Kong	Team
Pan American Games
Gold medal – first place	2023 Santiago	Singles
Gold medal – first place	2023 Santiago	Team
Silver medal – second place	2023 Santiago	Doubles

Olivia Weaver (née Fiechter; born 15 September 1995) is an American professional squash player. She reached a career high ranking of number 3 in the world during February 2026.

== Career ==
Weaver played at the junior level for Team USA as a teenager, representing them at the 2012, 2013, and 2014 junior world championships, with her highest finish being a place in the round of 16 in 2014 in Windhoek, Namibia.

From 2014 to 2018, Weaver played at Princeton University, occupying primarily the number 1 position throughout her career with the Tigers. She also played at the number one position for Germantown Friends School in Philadelphia, graduating in 2014. She won the 2018 Rhode Island Open professional tournament, beating Egyptian Menna Nasser in the final.

In 2022, she was part of the United States team that reached the final of the 2022 Women's World Team Squash Championships. It was the first time that the United States had reached the final.

In May 2024, Weaver won her first ever individual world medal, a bronze in Cairo, after losing out 3–2 in a tightly contested battle against seven-time Egyptian world champion Nour El Sherbini at the 2024 PSA Women's World Squash Championship. In December 2024, Weaver helped the United States win the silver medal at the 2024 Women's World Team Squash Championships.

In March 2025, Weaver won her tenth PSA title after securing victory in the Australian Open during the 2024–25 PSA Squash Tour. In May 2025, Weaver reached the semi-final of the 2025 Women's World Squash Championship in Chicago, but was defeated in a five game match by Nour El Sherbini who went on to win a record equalling eighth world title. In October she won an 11th tour title after she won the Silicon Valley Open during the 2025–26 PSA Squash Tour and in January 2026 won the Pepper Pike Open.

Weaver reached the semi-finals of the 2026 World Championship.

== Personal life ==
In October 2023, Fiechter married her longtime boyfriend Bobby Weaver, who also attended Princeton University.
