= Cindy Merlo =

Swiss professional squash player (born 1998)

Personal information
- Born: March 13, 1998 (age 28) Wald, Zürich, Switzerland
- Height: 166 cm (5 ft 5 in)
- Weight: 57 kg (126 lb)

Sport
- Country: Switzerland
- Handedness: Right Handed
- Coached by: Daniela Merlo
- Retired: Active
- Racquet used: Black Knight

Women's singles
- Highest ranking: No. 38 (1 January 2022)
- Current ranking: No. 48 (December 2022)
- Updated on December 2022

Cindy Merlo (born 13 March 1998 in Wald, Zürich) is a Swiss professional squash player. As of December 2022, she was ranked number 48 in the world. She has represented Switzerland internationally, for example at the European Team Championship.
