= Marina Stefanoni =

American squash player (born 2002)

Personal information
- Born: November 30, 2002 (age 23) Stamford, United States
- Years active: 3
- Height: 5 ft 5 in (165 cm)
- Weight: 135 lb (61 kg)

Sport
- Country: United States
- Handedness: Right-handed
- Turned pro: 2018
- Retired: Active
- Racquet used: Tecnifibre

Women's singles
- Highest ranking: No. 12 (October 2026)
- Current ranking: No. 12 (19 October 2026)
- Title: 10
Medal record
Women's squash
Representing United States
World Team Championships
Silver medal – second place	2024 Hong Kong	Team
Pan American Games
Bronze medal – third place	2023 Santiago	Singles
Junior Pan American Games
Gold medal – first place	2021 Cali-Valle	Singles
Gold medal – first place	2021 Cali-Valle	Team

Marina Stefanoni (born November 30, 2002) is an American professional squash player. She reached a career high ranking of number 12 in the world during October 2026.

Stefanoni is the third child of Peggy Stefanoni and Chris Stefanoni. She is of Guatemalan descent on her maternal line.

== Career ==
Stefanoni competed for Harvard Crimson squash.

After a first round exit at the 2024 PSA Women's World Squash Championship in May, she won her 9th PSA title after securing victory in the Costa Rica Open during the 2024–25 PSA Squash Tour.

Stefanoni helped the United States win the silver medal at the December 2024 Women's World Team Squash Championships.

Stefanoni secured her 10th PSA title in May 2025 by winning the Richmond Open, which moved her the world ranking to 28, her highest position to that point.
