= Georgia Adderley =

Scottish squash player (born 2001)

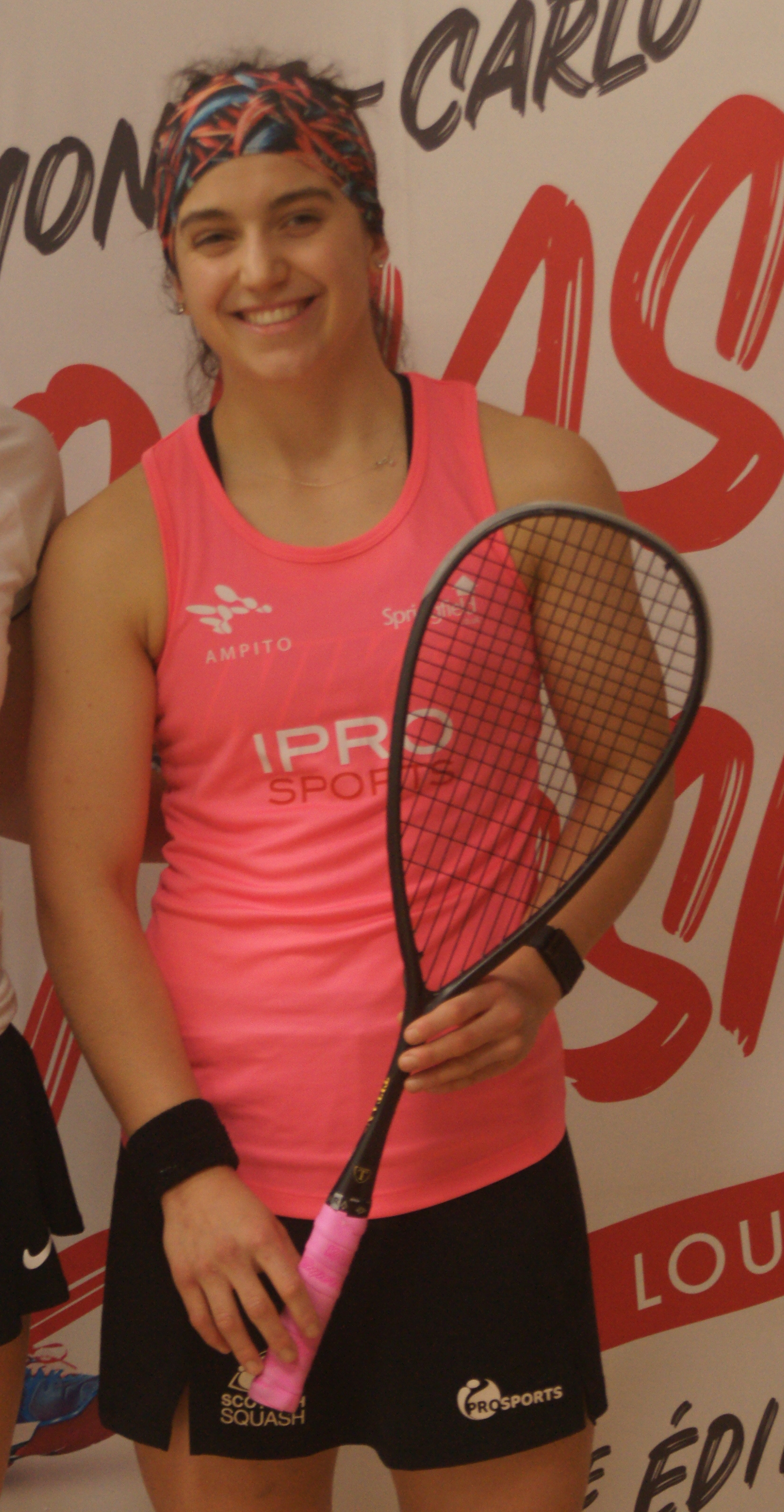

Personal information
- Nationality: British (Scottish)
- Born: 8 January 2001 (age 25) Edinburgh, Scotland
- Height: 167 cm (5 ft 6 in)
- Weight: 65 kg (143 lb)

Sport
- Handedness: right-handed
- Retired: active
- Racquet used: Salming

women's singles
- Highest ranking: 22 (April 2025)
- Current ranking: 26 (April 2026)
- Title: 6
Medal record
Representing Scotland
National Championships
Gold medal – first place	2017, 2022, 2024-25	singles

Georgia Adderley (born 8 January 2001) is a Scottish female professional squash player. She reached a career high PSA ranking of number 22 in the world during April 2025.

== Career ==
Adderley represented the Scottish team at the 2022 Commonwealth Games in the Birmingham, England, where she competed in the three events, reaching the quarter-finals in both the women's doubles and mixed doubles.

Adderley reached her highest career singles ranking to date of number 30 in the world in September 2024 during the 2024 PSA World Tour. In 2025, Adderley won her fourth national singles title at the Scottish National Squash Championships.

In March 2026, she won her 6th PSA title after securing victory in the Richardson Wealth Van Lawn Open during the 2025–26 PSA Squash Tour.
