= Nada Abbas =

Egyptian squash player (born 2000)

Personal information
- Full name: Nada Abbas Zein Elabdin Gaber Omran
- Born: 28 May 2000 (age 26) Giza, Egypt
- Education: new Giza university (Business)
- Height: 150 cm (4 ft 11 in)
- Weight: 50 kg (110 lb)

Sport
- Country: Egypt
- Handedness: Right Handed
- Turned pro: 2015
- Coached by: Mohamed Ismail
- Retired: Active
- Racquet used: Prince

Women's singles
- Highest ranking: No.12 (June 2022)
- Current ranking: No. 12 (14 July 2025)
- Title: London open 2016
- Tour final: HKFC PSA International squash open 2019

Nada Abbas Zain (born 28 May 2000) is an Egyptian professional squash player. She reached a career high ranking of number 12 in the world during June 2022.
