= Chan Yiwen =

Malaysian squash player (born 2000)

Personal information
- Born: 25 September 2000 (age 25) Jitra, Alor Setar, Kedah, Malaysia

Sport
- Country: Malaysian
- Handedness: right-handed
- Coached by: Ken Flynn
- Racquet used: Prince
- Highest ranking: 62 (September 2022)
- Current ranking: 130
Medal record
Representing Malaysia
World Team Championships
Bronze medal – third place	2022 Cairo	Team
Southeast Asian Games
Silver medal – second place	2019 Philippines	Singles

Chan Yiwen (born 25 September 2000) is a Malaysian female squash player and a current member of the Malaysian team. She reached a career high ranking of number 62 in the world during September 2022.

== Career ==
Yiwen achieved her highest career ranking (to date) of 87 in October 2020 at the 2020-21 PSA World Tour. In 2022, she was part of the Malaysian team that won a bronze at the 2022 Women's World Team Squash Championships.
