= Jana Shiha =

Egyptian squash player (born 2001)

Personal information
- Born: 22 August 2004 (age 21) Alexandria, Egypt

Sport
- Country: Egypt
- Retired: Active
- Racquet used: Tecnifibre

Women's singles
- Highest ranking: No. 30 (March 2023)
- Current ranking: No. 30 (March 2023)
- Updated on March 2023

Jana Shiha (born 22 August 2001 in Alexandria) is an Egyptian professional squash player. She achieved her career-high ranking of World No. 30 in March 2023. She was a member of Egypt's World Junior Team Championship-winning squad in August 2019. Jana is known for being a competitive, committed, and honest player. She won the 2019 CIB El Shams Tour 1 tournament.
