= Kaitlyn Watts =

New Zealand squash player (born 2001)

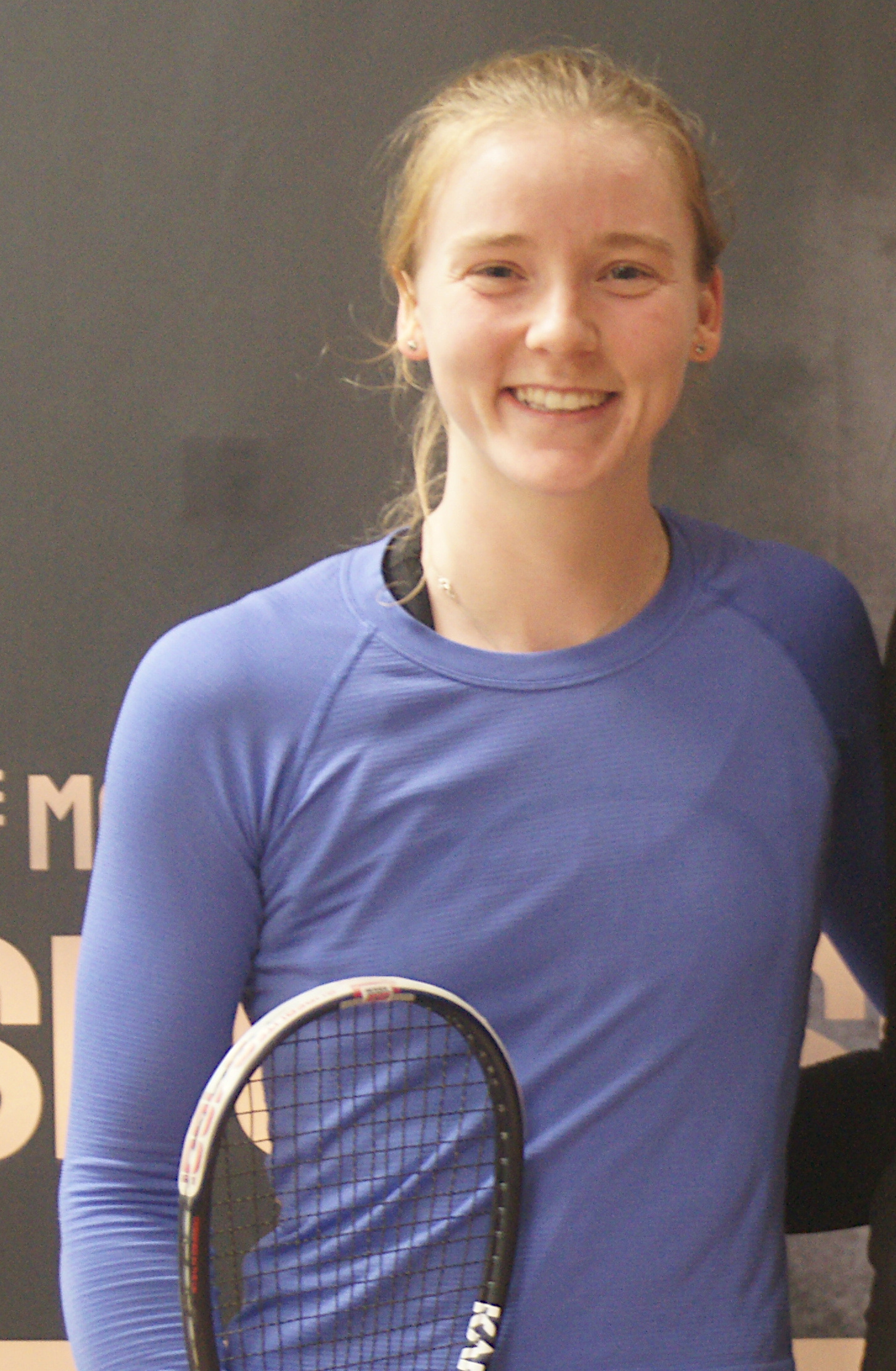

Personal information
- Nationality: New Zealander
- Born: 1 March 2001 (age 25) Palmerston North, New Zealand

Sport
- Turned pro: 2017
- Retired: Active
- Racquet used: Salming

Women's singles
- Highest ranking: No. 68 (April 2026)
- Current ranking: No. 68 (April 2026)
- Title: 4

Kaitlyn Watts (born 1 March 2001) is a New Zealand professional squash player. She reached a career high ranking of 68 in the world during April 2026.

== Biography ==
In March 2026, she won his 4th PSA title after securing victory in the Oceania World Championship Qualifiers during the 2025–26 PSA Squash Tour.
