= Menna Nasser =

Egyptian squash player (born 1994)

Personal information
- Born: 5 January 1994 (age 32) Cairo, Egypt

Sport
- Country: Egypt
- Handedness: Right Handed
- Turned pro: 2010
- Retired: Active
- Racquet used: Prince

Women's singles
- Highest ranking: No. 40 (January 2021)
- Current ranking: No. 40 (January 2021)
- Updated on September 2024

Menna Nasser (born 5 January 1994 in Cairo) is an Egyptian professional squash player. In January 2021, she was ranked number 40 in the world.
