= Sana Ibrahim =

Egyptian squash player (born 2003)

Personal information
- Born: 15 January 2003 (age 23) Cairo, Egypt

Sport
- Country: Egypt
- Turned pro: 2018
- Retired: Active
- Racquet used: Harrow

Women's singles
- Highest ranking: No. 16 (December 2024)
- Current ranking: No. 17 (14 July 2025)
- Title: 1

Sana Ibrahim (born 15 January 2003) is an Egyptian professional squash player. She reached a career high ranking of number 16 in the world during December 2024. She won her first professional title in the 2020 Egyptian Squash Tour.
