= Lucy Turmel =

English squash player (born 1999)

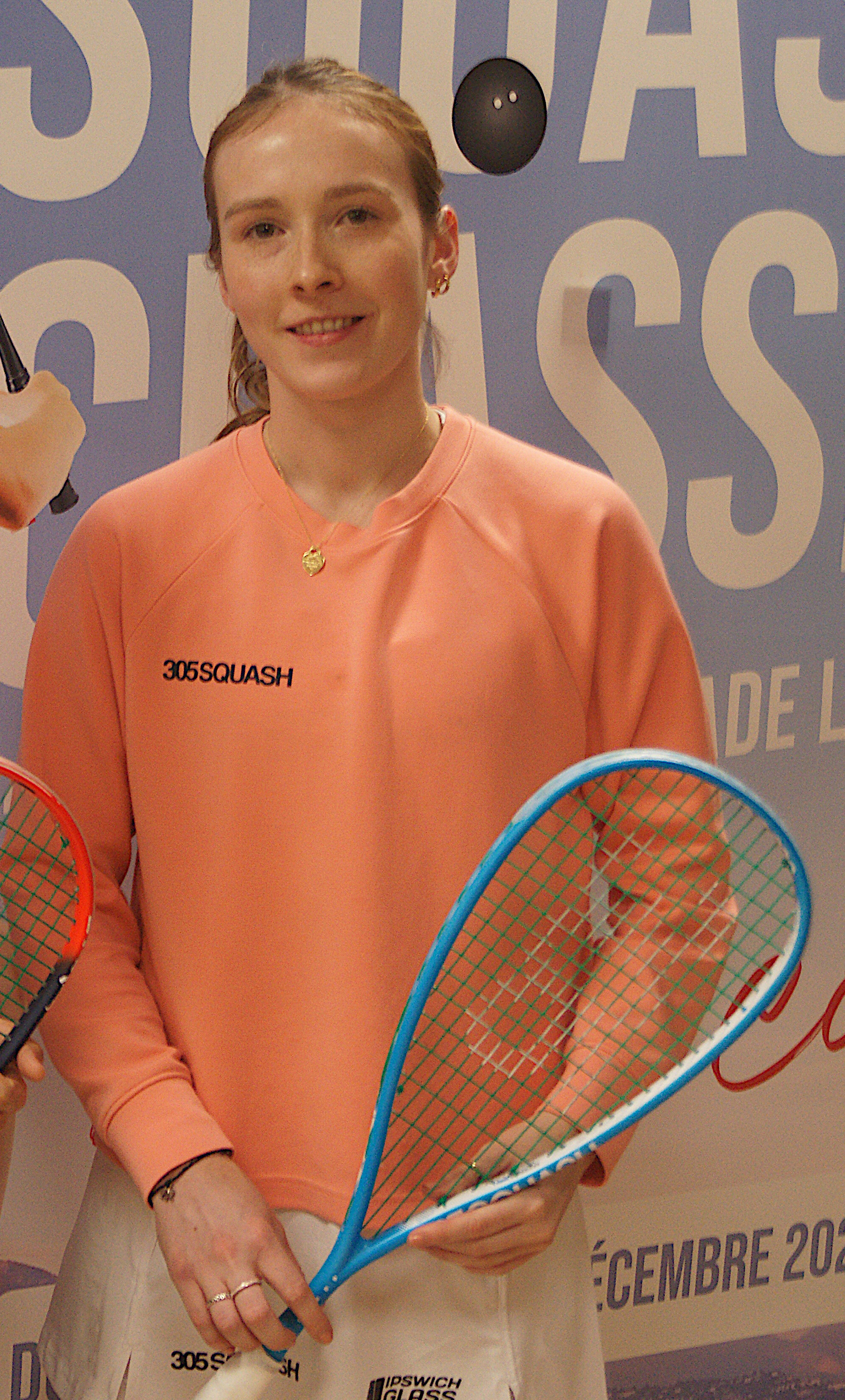
- Lucy Turmel, Monte Carlo Squash Classic 2022

Personal information
- Born: 24 September 1999 (age 26) Ipswich, England
- Website: https://lucyturmelofficial.co.uk/

Sport
- Country: England
- Handedness: Right Handed
- Coached by: Arthur Gaskin
- Retired: Active
- Racquet used: 305SQUASH ProCell XE110

Women's singles
- Highest ranking: No. 20 (April 2022)
- Current ranking: No. 23 (14 July 2025)
Medal record
Representing England
World Team Championships
Bronze medal – third place	2022 Cairo	Team
European Team Championships
Gold medal – first place	2022 Eindhoven	Team
Gold medal – first place	2023 Helsinki	Team
Silver medal – second place	2024 Uster	Team
Gold medal – first place	2026 Amsterdam	Team

Lucy Turmel (born 24 September 1999) is an English professional squash player. She reached a career high ranking of number 20 in the world during April 2022.

== Career ==
In 2022, she won a bronze with the England women's national squash team at the 2022 Women's World Team Squash Championships and also won a gold medal at the 2022 European Squash Team Championships in Eindhoven.

Turmel represented the England team in the 2022 Commonwealth Games in Birmingham, and reached the quarter-finals of the singles and doubles events.

In 2023, Turmel was part of the England squad that won the European Squash Team Championships in Helsinki. In 2024, Turmel was part of the England squad that reached the quarter-final of the 2024 World Team Championships before being eliminated by Malaysia.

In May 2026 she won the 2026 European Team Championships in Amsterdam with England.
