= Farida Mohamed =

Egyptian squash player

Personal information
- Born: January 15, 2002 (age 24) Alexandria, Egypt
- Height: 177 cm (5 ft 10 in)
- Weight: 67 kg (148 lb)

Sport
- Country: Egypt
- Handedness: Right Handed
- Turned pro: 2018
- Coached by: Tameem El Welily & Ahmed Shohayeb
- Retired: Active
- Racquet used: Tecnifibre

Women's singles
- Highest ranking: No. 14 (October 2022)
- Current ranking: No. 16 (14 July 2025)
- Title: 5
- Tour final: 7

Farida Mohamed (born 15 January 2002), is an Egyptian professional squash player. Farida is known as “The Bazooka” for her powerful shots. She reached a career high ranking of number 14 in the world during October 2022.

== Career ==
She won the 2018 Growthpoint South Africa Open PSA professional tournament, which was her first appearance on the PSA world tour, beating fellow Egyptian Menna Nasser in the final.

In October 2024, Mohamed won her 10th PSA title after securing victory in the New York Open Squash Classic during the 2024–25 PSA Squash Tour.

== Personal life ==
Her sister is the former Columbia Lions women's squash player Habiba Mohamed Ahmed Aly Mohamed. Habiba graduated Columbia class of 2022 and Farida is enrolled in the Columbia University class of 2024 and currently plays at number 1 on her team at Columbia.
