= 2014 WSA World Tour =

WSA World Tour 2014

Details
- Event name: WSA World Tour 2014
- Tournaments: 73
- Categories: WSA World Championship; WSA World Series (4); WSA Gold & Silver (11); WSA Tour (57)
- Website www.wsaworldtour.com

Achievements
- World Number 1: (Malaysia) Nicol David (12 months)
- World Champion: (Malaysia) Nicol David

Awards
- Player of the year: (Egypt) Raneem El Weleily
- Young player of the year: (United States) Amanda Sobhy

The WSA World Tour is the international squash tour and organized circuit, organized by the Women's Squash Association (WSA) for the 2014 squash season. The most important tournaments in the series are the World Championship, the US Open and the British Open. The tour features three categories of regular events, the World Series, which features the highest prize money and the best fields, and Gold and Silver tournaments. Players performances in the tour are rated by the WSA World Rankings. The Male equivalent is the PSA World Tour.

== 2014 Calendar ==
The Women's Squash Association organises the WSA World Tour, the female equivalent of the PSA World Tour Listed below are the most important events on the tour.

=== World Championship ===
| Tournament | Date | Champion | Runner-up | Semifinalists | Quarterfinalists |
|---|---|---|---|---|---|
| WSA World Championship 2014 (Egypt) Cairo, Egypt; World Championship $150,000 - Draw | 15–20 December 2014 | (Malaysia) Nicol David; 5–11, 11–8, 7–11, 14–12, 11–5 | (Egypt) Raneem El Weleily | (England) Alison Waters (Egypt) Omneya Abdel Kawy | (England) Laura Massaro (France) Camille Serme (Malaysia) Low Wee Wern (Egypt) Nour El Tayeb |

=== World Series ===
| Tournament | Date | Champion | Runner-up | Semifinalists | Quarterfinalists |
|---|---|---|---|---|---|
| British Open 2014 (England) Hull, England; World Series Platinum $100,000 - Draw | 11–18 May 2014 | (Malaysia) Nicol David; 8–11, 11–5, 11–7, 11–8 | (England) Laura Massaro | (Egypt) Raneem El Weleily (England) Alison Waters | (New Zealand) Joelle King (Malaysia) Low Wee Wern (Egypt) Omneya Abdel Kawy (England) Sarah Kippax |
| Malaysian Open Squash Championships 2014 (Malaysia) Kuala Lumpur, Malaysia; World Series Gold $70,000 - Draw | 18–23 August 2014 | (Egypt) Raneem El Weleily; 7–11, 11–3, 12–10, 2–11, 11–7 | (Egypt) Nour El Tayeb | (Malaysia) Nicol David (United States) Amanda Sobhy | (Hong Kong) Annie Au (Republic of Ireland) Madeline Perry (England) Sarah-Jane Perry (Egypt) Habiba Mohamed |
| Hong Kong Open 2014; Hong Kong, China; World Series Gold $77,000 - Draw | 27–31 August 2014 | (Malaysia) Nicol David; 11–4, 12–10, 11–8 | (Egypt) Nour El Tayeb | (England) Laura Massaro (United States) Amanda Sobhy | (France) Camille Serme (England) Alison Waters (Australia) Rachael Grinham (Hong Kong) Joey Chan |
| US Open 2014 (United States) Philadelphia, United States; World Series Platinum $115,000 - Draw | 13–18 October 2014 | (Malaysia) Nicol David; 11–5, 12–10, 12–10 | (Egypt) Nour El Sherbini | (Egypt) Raneem El Weleily (France) Camille Serme | (England) Laura Massaro (England) Alison Waters (Malaysia) Low Wee Wern (Egypt) Yathreb Adel |

=== Gold 50 ===
| Tournament | Date | Champion | Runner-up | Semifinalists | Quarterfinalists |
|---|---|---|---|---|---|
| Tournament of Champions 2014 (United States) New York City, United States; Gold 50 $50,000 - Draw | 18–24 January 2014 | (Malaysia) Nicol David; 11–4, 13–11, 11–8 | (England) Laura Massaro | (England) Alison Waters (France) Camille Serme | (New Zealand) Joelle King (Malaysia) Low Wee Wern (Republic of Ireland) Madeline Perry (England) Sarah-Jane Perry |
| Cleveland Classic 2014 (United States) Cleveland, United States; Gold 50 $50,000 - Draw | 30 January – 4 February 2014 | (Malaysia) Nicol David; 13–11, 11–5, 11–6 | (Hong Kong) Annie Au | (England) Alison Waters (Egypt) Nour El Tayeb | (England) Laura Massaro (Egypt) Raneem El Weleily (France) Camille Serme (Egypt) Omneya Abdel Kawy |
| Metro Squash Windy City Open 2014 (United States) Chicago, United States; Gold 50 $50,000 - Draw | 28 February – 3 March 2014 | (England) Laura Massaro; 9–11, 11–8, 11–9, 3–11, 11–6 | (Egypt) Raneem El Weleily | (New Zealand) Joelle King (France) Camille Serme | (England) Alison Waters (Malaysia) Low Wee Wern (Hong Kong) Annie Au (England) Emma Beddoes |
| Texas Open 2014 (United States) Dallas, United States; Gold 50 $50,000 - Draw | 8–13 April 2014 | (Egypt) Nour El Sherbini; 11–7, 5–11, 11–7, 11–8 | (India) Dipika Pallikal | (Republic of Ireland) Madeline Perry (France) Camille Serme | (Malaysia) Low Wee Wern (Australia) Rachael Grinham (Guyana) Nicolette Fernandes (England) Emma Beddoes |
| China Squash Open 2014; Shanghai, China; Gold 50 $50,000 - Draw | 2–7 September 2014 | (Malaysia) Low Wee Wern; 11–8, 11–6, 8–11, 8–11, 12–10 | (France) Camille Serme | (Egypt) Nouran Ahmed Gohar (Egypt) Salma Hany Ibrahim | (Hong Kong) Annie Au (India) Dipika Pallikal (England) Jenny Duncalf (England) Sarah Kippax |
| Carol Weymuller Open 2014 (United States) Brooklyn, United States; Gold 50 $50,000 - Draw | 30 September – 6 October 2014 | (England) Alison Waters; 9–11, 12–10, 11–5, 12–10 | (Egypt) Omneya Abdel Kawy | (England) Laura Massaro (Egypt) Raneem El Weleily | (England) Emma Beddoes (Guyana) Nicolette Fernandes (Egypt) Nour El Tayeb (Egypt) Salma Hany Ibrahim |
| Macau Open 2014; Macau, China; Gold 50 $50,0000 - Draw | 21–26 October 2014 | (Malaysia) Nicol David; 11–8, 11–2, 11–8 | (Egypt) Raneem El Weleily | (Australia) Rachael Grinham (England) Jenny Duncalf | (Hong Kong) Annie Au (England) Sarah-Jane Perry (England) Emma Beddoes (Malaysia) Delia Arnold |

=== Silver 35 ===
| Tournament | Date | Champion | Runner-up | Semifinalists | Quarterfinalists |
|---|---|---|---|---|---|
| Greenwich Open 2014 (United States) Greenwich, United States; Silver 35 $35,000 | 22–24 January 2014 | (New Zealand) Joelle King; 11–6, 9–11, 8–11, 12–10, 11–8 | (Malaysia) Low Wee Wern | (Hong Kong) Annie Au (United States) Amanda Sobhy | (Egypt) Nour El Sherbini (England) Sarah-Jane Perry (Guyana) Nicolette Fernandes (Hong Kong) Joey Chan |

=== Silver 25 ===
| Tournament | Date | Champion | Runner-up | Semifinalists | Quarterfinalists |
|---|---|---|---|---|---|
| Granite Open 2014 (Canada) Toronto, Canada; Silver 25 $25,000 | 2–7 March 2014 | (United States) Amanda Sobhy; 11–5, 11–9, 11–5 | (Egypt) Omneya Abdel Kawy | (Australia) Rachael Grinham (England) Sarah-Jane Perry | (Denmark) Line Hansen (England) Sarah Kippax (Canada) Samantha Cornett (Wales) Tesni Evans |
| Hong Kong FC International 2014; Hong Kong, China; Silver 25 $25,000 | 19–24 May 2014 | (United States) Amanda Sobhy; 11–6, 11–2, 11–9 | (Australia) Rachael Grinham | (Guyana) Nicolette Fernandes (Egypt) Salma Hany Ibrahim | (Hong Kong) Joey Chan (Australia) Donna Urquhart (Egypt) Heba El Torky (Malaysia) Delia Arnold |
| Atlantis Open 2014 (Egypt) Alexandria, Egypt; Silver 25 $25,000 | 16–21 September 2014 | (Egypt) Habiba Mohamed; 11–13, 11–8, 11–5, 11–7 | (Egypt) Nour El Tayeb | (Egypt) Omneya Abdel Kawy (Denmark) Line Hansen | (Egypt) Nouran Ahmed Gohar (Egypt) Salma Hany Ibrahim (Czech Republic) Lucie Fialová (Netherlands) Milou van der Heijden |
| Monte Carlo Classic 2014 (Monaco) Monte Carlo, Monaco; Silver 25 $25,000 | 4–7 November 2014 | (Egypt) Nouran Ahmed Gohar; 15–13, 10–12, 11–7, 7–11, 11–9 | (Egypt) Omneya Abdel Kawy | (India) Dipika Pallikal (Egypt) Habiba Mohamed | (France) Camille Serme (Republic of Ireland) Madeline Perry (Republic of Ireland) Aisling Blake (Egypt) Mariam Ibrahim Metwally |

== Year end world top 10 players ==
| Rank | 2014 | |
|---|---|---|
| 1 | (Malaysia) Nicol David | 3,398.120 |
| 2 | (England) Laura Massaro | 2,088.530 |
| 3 | (Egypt) Raneem El Weleily | 1,984.120 |
| 4 | (Egypt) Nour El Sherbini | 1,362.310 |
| 5 | (England) Alison Waters | 1,248.890 |
| 6 | (France) Camille Serme | 1,084.130 |
| 7 | (Malaysia) Low Wee Wern | 1,033.160 |
| 8 | (Egypt) Nour El Tayeb | 1,000.500 |
| 9 | (Hong Kong) Annie Au | 857.250 |
| 10 | (Egypt) Omneya Abdel Kawy | 788.571 |

== Retirements ==
Following is a list of notable players (winners of a main tour title, and/or part of the WSA World Rankings top 30 for at least one month) who announced their retirement from professional squash, became inactive, or were permanently banned from playing, during the 2014 season:

- (Australia) Kasey Brown (born 1 August 1985 in Taree) joined the pro tour in 2002, reached the singles no. 5 spot in December 2011. She won 11 WSA World Tour titles including the Greenwich Open in 2011 and the Australian Open in 2006. In 2011, she reached the final of the US Open, the biggest success of her career. She retired in October 2014 after competing a last time in the US Open.
- (Italy) Manuela Manetta (born 6 June 1983 in Parma) joined the pro tour in 2002, reached the singles no. 25 spot in December 2007. She reached in 2010 the semifinals of the US Open and won more of ten National championships in Italia.

== See also ==
- Women's Squash Association (WSA)
- WSA World Series 2014
- WSA World Series Finals
- WSA World Open
- Official Women's Squash World Ranking
- PSA World Tour 2014
- 2014 Women's World Team Squash Championships
