= 2013 Women's World Open Squash Championship =

Women's World Open 2013
- 30th WSA World Squash Championship
- Location: Penang, Malaysia
- Date(s): 14–21 March 2014
- Website www.simplythebest.my

WSA World Tour
- Category: WSA World Open
- Prize money: $120,000

Results
- Champion: (England) Laura Massaro
- Runner-up: (Egypt) Nour El Sherbini
- Semi-finalists: (Malaysia) Nicol David (Egypt) Raneem El Weleily

The 2013 Women's World Open Squash Championship is the women's edition of the 2013 World Open, which serves as the individual world championship for squash players. The event took place at SPICE Arena in Penang in Malaysia from 14 March to 21 March 2014. Laura Massaro won her first World Open title, beating Nour El Sherbini in the final.

== Prize money and ranking points ==
For 2013, the prize purse was $120,000. The prize money and points breakdown is as follows:

Prize Money World Open (2013)
| Event | W | F | SF | QF | 2R | 1R |
| Points (WSA) | 5300 | 3630 | 2150 | 1150 | 575 | 330 |
| Prize money | $17,850 | $12,075 | $7,090 | $4,200 | $2,360 | $1,315 |

== Seeds ==
1. (Malaysia) Nicol David (semifinals)
2. (England) Laura Massaro (champion)
3. (Egypt) Raneem El Weleily (semifinals)
4. (England) Alison Waters (second round)
5. (New Zealand) Joelle King (quarterfinals)
6. (Malaysia) Low Wee Wern (quarterfinals)
7. (Republic of Ireland) Madeline Perry (quarterfinals)
8. (France) Camille Serme (quarterfinals)
9. (England) Jenny Duncalf (second round)
10. (India) Dipika Pallikal (second round)
11. (Hong Kong) Annie Au (first round)
12. (Australia) Kasey Brown (first round)
13. (Egypt) Omneya Abdel Kawy (second round)
14. (Australia) Rachael Grinham (first round)
15. (England) Sarah-Jane Perry (second round)
16. (Denmark) Line Hansen (first round)

== Draw and results ==
First round
1 | (Malaysia) Nicol David | 11 | 11 | 11
(England) Emma Beddoes | 9 | 5 | 8
11 | (Hong Kong) Annie Au | 11 | 11 | 7 | 8
Q | (Egypt) Heba El Torky | 13 | 4 | 11 | 11
8 | (France) Camille Serme | 11 | 11 | 11
Q | (Egypt) Habiba Mohamed | 6 | 10 | 7
14 | (Australia) Rachael Grinham | 11 | 11 | 10 | 8 | 7
(Guyana) Nicolette Fernandes | 4 | 6 | 12 | 11 | 11
4 | (England) Alison Waters | 11 | 11 | 9 | 11
(India) Joshna Chinappa | 7 | 7 | 11 | 2
12 | (Australia) Kasey Brown | 10 | 10 | 11 | 5
(Egypt) Nour El Sherbini | 12 | 12 | 8 | 11
5 | (New Zealand) Joelle King | 11 | 11 | 11
Q | (Wales) Tesni Evans | 3 | 5 | 8
13 | (Egypt) Omneya Abdel Kawy | 9 | 11 | 11 | 11
Q | (Egypt) Nour El Tayeb | 11 | 8 | 7 | 7
(Hong Kong) Joey Chan | 3 | 5 | 9
15 | (England) Sarah-Jane Perry | 11 | 11 | 11
(England) Sarah Kippax | 8 | 11 | 2
7 | (Republic of Ireland) Madeline Perry | 11 | 13 | 11
Q | (England) Lisa Aitken | 2 | 6 | 8
10 | (India) Dipika Pallikal | 11 | 11 | 11
Q | (Egypt) Salma Hany Ibrahim | 9 | 4 | 4
3 | (Egypt) Raneem El Weleily | 11 | 11 | 11
Q | (Canada) Samantha Cornett | 11 | 11 | 11
16 | (Denmark) Line Hansen | 5 | 7 | 7
(Australia) Donna Urquhart | 7 | 6 | 8
6 | (Malaysia) Low Wee Wern | 11 | 11 | 11
Q | (New Zealand) Megan Craig | 8 | 4 | 3
9 | (England) Jenny Duncalf | 11 | 11 | 11
WC | (Malaysia) Vanessa Raj | 7 | 4 | 1
2 | (England) Laura Massaro | 11 | 11 | 11

Second round
1 | (Malaysia) Nicol David | 11 | 11 | 11
Q | (Egypt) Heba El Torky | 6 | 3 | 4
8 | (France) Camille Serme | 14 | 11 | 11
(Guyana) Nicolette Fernandes | 12 | 5 | 3
4 | (England) Alison Waters | 3 | 9 | 11 | 3
(Egypt) Nour El Sherbini | 11 | 11 | 7 | 11
5 | (New Zealand) Joelle King | 11 | 11 | 11
13 | (Egypt) Omneya Abdel Kawy | 8 | 4 | 4
15 | (England) Sarah-Jane Perry | 11 | 12 | 9 | 9 | 6
7 | (Republic of Ireland) Madeline Perry | 7 | 10 | 11 | 11 | 11
10 | (India) Dipika Pallikal | 7 | 7 | 1
3 | (Egypt) Raneem El Weleily | 11 | 11 | 11
Q | (Canada) Samantha Cornett | 8 | 3 | 9
6 | (Malaysia) Low Wee Wern | 11 | 11 | 11
9 | (England) Jenny Duncalf | 9 | 6 | 4
2 | (England) Laura Massaro | 11 | 11 | 11

Quarter finals
1 | (Malaysia) Nicol David | 9 | 11 | 11 | 6 | 11
8 | (France) Camille Serme | 11 | 5 | 5 | 11 | 4
(Egypt) Nour El Sherbini | 11 | 8 | 13 | 11
5 | (New Zealand) Joelle King | 9 | 11 | 11 | 6
7 | (Republic of Ireland) Madeline Perry | 12 | 12 | 3 | 11 | 7
3 | (Egypt) Raneem El Weleily | 10 | 14 | 11 | 7 | 11
6 | (Malaysia) Low Wee Wern | 14 | 6 | 11 | 11 | 7
2 | (England) Laura Massaro | 12 | 11 | 6 | 13 | 11

Semi finals
1 | (Malaysia) Nicol David | 11 | 9 | 6 | 11 | 9
(Egypt) Nour El Sherbini | 4 | 11 | 11 | 2 | 11
Final
(Egypt) Nour El Sherbini | 7 | 11 | 9 | 11 | 9
2 | (England) Laura Massaro | 11 | 6 | 11 | 5 | 11
3 | (Egypt) Raneem El Weleily | 9 | 7 | 11 | 7
2 | (England) Laura Massaro | 11 | 11 | 6 | 11

== See also ==
- World Open
- 2013 Men's World Open Squash Championship

| Preceded by Cayman Island (Grand Cayman); 2012 | WSA World Open; Malaysia (Penang); 2013 | Succeeded by Egypt (Cairo); 2014 |

| Preceded by Hong Kong Open; Hong Kong; 2013 | WSA World Series 2014; World Open; Malaysia (Penang); 2013 | Succeeded by British Open; England (Hull); 2014 |
