= Women's United States Open (squash) 2014 =

US Open 2014
- 15th WSA U.S. Open

Details
- Event name: Delaware Investments United States Open 2014
- Location: (United States) Philadelphia, Pennsylvania
- Venue: Daskalakis Athletic Center
- Website www.usopensquash.com/philadelphia/

Women's Winner
- Category: World Series Platinum
- Prize money: $115,000
- Year: World Tour 2014

The Women's United States Squash Open 2014 is the women's edition of the 2014 United States Open (squash), which is a WSA World Series event Platinum (prize money: $115 000). The event took place at the Daskalakis Athletic Center in Philadelphia, Pennsylvania in the United States from the 11th of October to the 18th of October. Nicol David won her third US Open trophy, beating Nour El Sherbini in the final.

== Prize money and ranking points ==
For 2014, the prize purse was $115,000. The prize money and points breakdown was as follows:

Prize money US Open (2014)
Event	W	F	SF	QF	2R	1R
Points (WSA)	4800	3300	1950	1050	525	300
Prize money	$17,000	$11,500	$6,750	$4,000	$2,250	$1,250

== Seeds ==
1. (Malaysia) Nicol David (champion)
2. (England) Laura Massaro (quarterfinals)
3. (Egypt) Raneem El Weleily (semifinals)
4. (France) Camille Serme (semifinals)
5. (England) Alison Waters (quarterfinals)
6. (Malaysia) Low Wee Wern (quarterfinals)
7. (Egypt) Nour El Sherbini (final)
8. (Hong Kong) Annie Au (second round)
9. (Republic of Ireland) Madeline Perry (first round)
10. (Egypt) Omneya Abdel Kawy (second round)
11. (England) Jenny Duncalf (second round)
12. (Australia) Rachael Grinham (second round)
13. (Australia) Kasey Brown (first round)
14. (England) Sarah-Jane Perry (first round)
15. (England) Sarah Kippax (second round)
16. (Guyana) Nicolette Fernandes (second round)

== Draw and results ==
1* First round 2*
1	(Malaysia) Nicol David	11	11	11
Q	(Mexico) Samantha Terán	6	5	4
12	(Australia) Rachael Grinham	11	11	3	11
Q	(Egypt) Habiba Mohamed	3	9	11	7
6	(Malaysia) Low Wee Wern	11	14	7	11
(Hong Kong) Joey Chan	5	12	11	6
16	(Guyana) Nicolette Fernandes	11	12	11
Q	(Republic of Ireland) Aisling Blake	5	10	5
3	(Egypt) Raneem El Weleily	11	7	12	11
Q	(Canada) Samantha Cornett	7	11	10	7
10	(Egypt) Omneya Abdel Kawy	12	11	11	13
(England) Emily Whitlock	14	6	9	11
5	(England) Alison Waters	11	11	11
Q	(Egypt) Salma Hany Ibrahim	9	8	3
9	(Republic of Ireland) Madeline Perry	2	6	9
(Egypt) Nouran Ahmed Gohar	11	11	11
Q	(Egypt) Yathreb Adel	11	11	9	11
14	(England) Sarah-Jane Perry	6	7	11	7
Q	(England) Victoria Lust	4	8	8
8	(Hong Kong) Annie Au	11	11	11
(Wales) Tesni Evans	7	10	11	11	11
13	(Australia) Kasey Brown	11	12	8	6	7
WC	(United States) Sabrina Sobhy	6	4	11
4	(France) Camille Serme	11	11	13
(Egypt) Heba El Torky	2	5	6
11	(England) Jenny Duncalf	11	11	11
(England) Emma Beddoes	4	11	1	8
7	(Egypt) Nour El Sherbini	11	6	11	11
(Denmark) Line Hansen	5	9	11	14	8
15	(England) Sarah Kippax	11	11	5	12	11
Q	(South Africa) Siyoli Waters	4	6	6
2	(England) Laura Massaro	11	11	11

1* Second round 2*
1	(Malaysia) Nicol David	11	11	11
12	(Australia) Rachael Grinham	1	8	3
6	(Malaysia) Low Wee Wern	11	11	5	11
16	(Guyana) Nicolette Fernandes	8	7	11	3
3	(Egypt) Raneem El Weleily	11	11	11
10	(Egypt) Omneya Abdel Kawy	8	9	6
5	(England) Alison Waters	12	11	1	15	11
(Egypt) Nouran Ahmed Gohar	10	8	11	17	2
Q	(Egypt) Yathreb Adel	11	11	11
8	(Hong Kong) Annie Au	9	8	3
(Wales) Tesni Evans	7	8	7
4	(France) Camille Serme	11	11	11
11	(England) Jenny Duncalf	4	7	5
7	(Egypt) Nour El Sherbini	11	11	11
15	(England) Sarah Kippax	10	7	11	3
2	(England) Laura Massaro	12	11	7	11

Quarter finals 1*
1	(Malaysia) Nicol David	11	11	11
6	(Malaysia) Low Wee Wern	6	4	9
3	(Egypt) Raneem El Weleily	11	11	11
5	(England) Alison Waters	9	8	5
Q	(Egypt) Yathreb Adel	11	6	11	8	3
4	(France) Camille Serme *	8	11	7	11	11
7	(Egypt) Nour El Sherbini *	11	4	1	11	11
2	(England) Laura Massaro	9	11	11	6	5

Semi finals
1	(Malaysia) Nicol David *	11	15	6	11
3	(Egypt) Raneem El Weleily	3	13	11	7
Final
1	(Malaysia) Nicol David *	11	12	12
7	(Egypt) Nour El Sherbini	5	10	10
4	(France) Camille Serme	11	9	8	8
7	(Egypt) Nour El Sherbini *	7	11	11	11

== See also ==
- United States Open (squash)
- WSA World Series 2014
- Men's United States Open (squash) 2014

Preceded by Hong Kong Open; Hong Kong; 2013	WSA World Series 2014; US Open; United States (Philadelphia); 2014	Succeeded by World Championship; Egypt (Cairo); 2014
