= 2014 Women's British Open Squash Championship =

British Open Squash Championships
- 84th Women's British Open

Details
- Event name: Allam British Open 2014
- Location: (United Kingdom) Hull, England
- Venue: Sports Arena
- Website www.britishopensquash.net

Women's Winner
- Category: World Series Platinum
- Prize money: $100,000
- Year: World Tour 2014

The Women's Allam British Open 2014 is the women's edition of the 2014 British Open Squash Championships, which is a WSA World Series event Platinum (Prize money: $100 000). The event took place at the Sports Arena in Hull in England from 12 May to 18 May. Nicol David won her fifth British Open trophy, beating Laura Massaro in the final.

== Prize money and ranking points ==
For 2014, the prize purse was $100,000. The prize money and points breakdown is as follows:

Prize Money British Open (2014)
Event	W	F	SF	QF	2R	1R
Points (WSA)	4800	3300	1950	1050	525	300
Prize money	$14,450	$9,775	$5,740	$3,400	$1,910	$1,060

== Seeds ==
1. (Malaysia) Nicol David (champion)
2. (England) Laura Massaro (final)
3. (Egypt) Raneem El Weleily (semifinals)
4. (New Zealand) Joelle King (quarterfinals)
5. (England) Alison Waters (semifinals)
6. (France) Camille Serme (second round)
7. (Malaysia) Low Wee Wern (quarterfinals)
8. (Republic of Ireland) Madeline Perry (first round)
9. (Hong Kong) Annie Au (second round)
10. (England) Jenny Duncalf (first round)
11. (Egypt) Omneya Abdel Kawy (quarterfinals)
12. (India) Dipika Pallikal (first round)
13. (Egypt) Nour El Sherbini (first round)
14. (Australia) Kasey Brown (second round)
15. (Australia) Rachael Grinham (first round)
16. (England) Sarah-Jane Perry (second round)

== Draw and results ==
First round
1	(Malaysia) Nicol David	11	12	11
Q	(Egypt) Heba El Torky	8	10	8
16	(England) Sarah-Jane Perry	11	13	10	11
(Denmark) Line Hansen	6	11	12	8
6	(France) Camille Serme	13	11	11
(Egypt) Nour El Tayeb	11	3	2
11	(Egypt) Omneya Abdel Kawy	12	11	11
Q	(Wales) Deon Saffery	10	4	9
4	(New Zealand) Joelle King	11	11	11
Q	(South Africa) Siyoli Waters	2	5	5
15	(Australia) Rachael Grinham	11	7	11	2	6
(India) Joshna Chinappa	7	11	5	11	11
5	(England) Alison Waters	9	11	11	6	11
Q	(Canada) Samantha Cornett	11	7	6	11	6
12	(India) Dipika Pallikal	11	10	7	11	11
Q	(Wales) Tesni Evans	6	12	11	4	13
(England) Emma Beddoes	11	7	11	11
13	(Egypt) Nour El Sherbini	7	11	6	9
Q	(Malaysia) Delia Arnold	6	11	1	13	7
7	(Malaysia) Low Wee Wern	11	7	11	11	11
WC	(England) Emily Whitlock	8	4	11	4
14	(Australia) Kasey Brown	11	11	7	11
Q	(Egypt) Nouran Ahmed Gohar	4	6	11	11	4
3	(Egypt) Raneem El Weleily	11	11	8	9	11
(England) Sarah Kippax	11	2	6	13	11
10	(England) Jenny Duncalf	6	11	11	11	8
(Guyana) Nicolette Fernandes	11	11	11
8	(Republic of Ireland) Madeline Perry	8	4	4
Q	(Australia) Donna Urquhart	11	9	9	3
9	(Hong Kong) Annie Au	7	11	11	11
(Hong Kong) Joey Chan	3	4	7
2	(England) Laura Massaro	11	11	11

1* 2* Second round 3* 4*
1	(Malaysia) Nicol David	11	13	11
16	(England) Sarah-Jane Perry	6	11	4
6	(France) Camille Serme	11	11	6	9	11
11	(Egypt) Omneya Abdel Kawy	8	9	11	11	13
4	(New Zealand) Joelle King	11	11	8	11
(India) Joshna Chinappa	6	7	11	1
5	(England) Alison Waters	11	11	11
Q	(Wales) Tesni Evans	7	9	6
(England) Emma Beddoes	9	9	11	11	9
7	(Malaysia) Low Wee Wern	11	11	3	6	11
14	(Australia) Kasey Brown	5	6	3
3	(Egypt) Raneem El Weleily	11	11	11
(England) Sarah Kippax	15	11	13	11	12
(Guyana) Nicolette Fernandes	17	7	15	3	10
9	(Hong Kong) Annie Au	7	4	6
2	(England) Laura Massaro	11	11	11

1* Quarter finals 2*
1	(Malaysia) Nicol David	11	12	11
11	(Egypt) Omneya Abdel Kawy	7	10	4
4	(New Zealand) Joelle King	7	11	6	6
5	(England) Alison Waters	11	9	11	11
7	(Malaysia) Low Wee Wern	5	6	8
3	(Egypt) Raneem El Weleily	11	11	11
(England) Sarah Kippax	8	10	8
2	(England) Laura Massaro	11	12	11

Semi finals *
1	(Malaysia) Nicol David	8	11	11	11
5	(England) Alison Waters	11	5	4	2
Final
1	(Malaysia) Nicol David *	8	11	11	11
2	(England) Laura Massaro	11	5	7	8
3	(Egypt) Raneem El Weleily	11	8	4	7
2	(England) Laura Massaro	6	11	11	11

== See also ==
- WSA World Series 2014
- 2014 Men's British Open

Preceded by World Open; Malaysia (Penang); 2013	WSA World Series 2014; British Open; England (Hull); 2014	Succeeded by Malaysian Open; Malaysia (Kuala Lumpur); 2014
