= Women's Hong Kong squash Open 2014 =

Cathay Pacific Hong Kong Open 2014
- 13th WSA Hong Kong Open

Details
- Event name: Cathay Pacific Sun Hung Kai Financial Hong Kong Squash Open 2014
- Location: Hong Kong
- Venue: Hong Kong Squash Centre - Tsim Sha Tsui
- Website http://www.hksquashopen.com/home.php

Women's Winner
- Category: World Series Gold
- Prize money: $77,000
- Year: World Tour 2014

The Women's Cathay Pacific Hong Kong Open 2014 is the women's edition of the 2014 Hong Kong Open, which is a WSA World Series event Gold (prize money: 77 000 $). The event took place in Hong Kong from 27 August to 31 August. Nicol David won her ninth Hong Kong Open trophy, beating Nour El Tayeb in the final.

== Prize money and ranking points ==
For 2014, the prize purse was $77,000. The prize money and points breakdown is as follows:

Prize money Hong Kong Open (2014)
Event	W	F	SF	QF	2R	1R
Points (WSA)	3360	2310	1365	735	365,5	210
Prize money	$11,390	$7,705	$4,525	$2,680	$1,505	$835

== Seeds ==
1. (Malaysia) Nicol David (champion)
2. (England) Laura Massaro (semifinals)
3. (France) Camille Serme (quarterfinals)
4. (England) Alison Waters (quarterfinals)
5. (Malaysia) Low Wee Wern (second round)
6. (Hong Kong) Annie Au (second round)
7. (Egypt) Omneya Abdel Kawy (second round)
8. (United States) Amanda Sobhy (semifinals)
9. (England) Jenny Duncalf (second round)
10. (Australia) Rachael Grinham (quarterfinals)
11. (England) Sarah-Jane Perry (second round)
12. (Guyana) Nicolette Fernandes (first round)
13. (England) Emma Beddoes (second round)
14. (India) Joshna Chinappa (first round)
15. (Hong Kong) Joey Chan (quarterfinals)
16. (Egypt) Nour El Tayeb (final)

== Draw and results ==
1* First round 2*
1	(Malaysia) Nicol David	11	11	11
Q	(Malaysia) Delia Arnold	5	5	5
13	(England) Emma Beddoes	12	11	11
(South Africa) Siyoli Waters	10	5	6
7	(Egypt) Omneya Abdel Kawy	11	11	6	11
(Wales) Tesni Evans	2	5	11	6
15	(Hong Kong) Joey Chan	11	11	11
Q	(Netherlands) Milou van der Heijden	3	6	4
3	(France) Camille Serme	11	11	8	11
Q	(France) Laura Pomportes	8	6	11	5
9	(England) Jenny Duncalf	11	11	11
Q	(United States) Latasha Khan	4	5	2
8	(United States) Amanda Sobhy	11	13	11
Q	(Egypt) Salma Hany Ibrahim	6	11	5
12	(Guyana) Nicolette Fernandes	8	9	10
(England) Victoria Lust	11	11	12
Q	(Egypt) Mariam Metwally	11	10	8
16	(Egypt) Nour El Tayeb	13	12	11
WC	(Hong Kong) Tong Tsz-Wing	11	4	2	8
5	(Malaysia) Low Wee Wern	7	11	11	11
(Denmark) Line Hansen	3	11	11	9	8
11	(England) Sarah-Jane Perry	11	5	8	11	11
(Japan) Misaki Kobayashi	4	8	7
4	(England) Alison Waters	11	11	11
Q	(Mexico) Samantha Terán	4	7	10
10	(Australia) Rachael Grinham	11	11	12
(Egypt) Heba El Torky	6	4	4
6	(Hong Kong) Annie Au	11	11	11
(Egypt) Nouran Gohar	13	12	11
14	(India) Joshana Chinappa	11	10	8
Q	(Egypt) Kanzy El Defrawy	6	4	3
2	(England) Laura Massaro	11	11	11

Second round *
1	(Malaysia) Nicol David	11	11	8	11
13	(England) Emma Beddoes	4	6	11	7
7	(Egypt) Omneya Abdel Kawy	8	11	7
15	(Hong Kong) Joey Chan	11	13	11
3	(France) Camille Serme	11	6	11	11	12
9	(England) Jenny Duncalf	13	11	4	3	10
8	(United States) Amanda Sobhy	11	11	11
(England) Victoria Lust	6	8	6
16	(Egypt) Nour El Tayeb	11	7	11	7	11
5	(Malaysia) Low Wee Wern	8	11	3	11	5
11	(England) Sarah-Jane Perry	7	9	9
4	(England) Alison Waters	11	11	11
10	(Australia) Rachael Grinham	9	11	11	11
6	(Hong Kong) Annie Au	11	4	5	9
(Egypt) Nouran Ahmed Gohar	5	8	11	9
2	(England) Laura Massaro	11	11	8	11

1* Quarter finals
1	(Malaysia) Nicol David	11	11	11
15	(Hong Kong) Joey Chan	8	4	3
3	(France) Camille Serme	5	11	7	3
8	(United States) Amanda Sobhy	11	1	11	11
16	(Egypt) Nour El Tayeb	11	9	11	11
4	(England) Alison Waters	4	11	4	8
10	(Australia) Rachael Grinham	8	11	9	11	10
2	(England) Laura Massaro 2*	11	7	11	5	12

Semi finals
1	(Malaysia) Nicol David *	11	11	11
8	(United States) Amanda Sobhy	8	4	2
Final
1	(Malaysia) Nicol David *	11	12	11
16	(Egypt) Nour El Tayeb	4	10	8
16	(Egypt) Nour El Tayeb *	11	10	11	12
2	(England) Laura Massaro	9	12	2	10

== See also ==
- Hong Kong Open (squash)
- Men's Hong Kong squash Open 2014
- WSA World Series 2014

Preceded by Malaysian Open; Malaysia (Kuala Lumpur); 2014	WSA World Series 2014; Hong Kong Open; Hong Kong; 2014	Succeeded by US Open; United States (Philadelphia); 2014
