= 2014 WSA World Series =

WSA World Series 2014

Details
- Event name: WSA World Series 2014
- Website wsaworldtour.com/site/players/world-series-standings

Women's Winner
- Year: World Tour 2014
- Current: 2014 Women's World Open Squash Championship

The WSA World Series 2014 is a series of women's squash tournaments which are part of the Women's Squash Association (WSA) World Tour for the 2014 squash season. The WSA World Series tournaments are some of the most prestigious events on the women's tour. Nicol David won the 2014 WSA World Series followed by Raneem El Weleily and Laura Massaro.

== WSA World Series Ranking Points ==
WSA World Series events also have a separate World Series ranking. Points for this are calculated on a cumulative basis after each World Series event.

Tournament			Ranking Points
Rank	Prize Money US$	Ranking Points	Winner	Runner up	3/4	5/8	9/16	17/32
World Series	$70,000+	625 points	100	65	40	25	15	10

== 2014 Tournaments ==
Tournament	Country	Location	Rank	Prize money	Date	2014 Winner
World Open 2013	Malaysia	Penang	World Open	$120,000	14-21 March 2014	(England) Laura Massaro
British Open 2014	England	Hull	World Series Platinum	$100,000	11–18 May 2014	(Malaysia) Nicol David
Malaysian Open 2014	Malaysia	Kuala Lumpur	World Series Gold	$70,000	18–23 August 2014	(Egypt) Raneem El Weleily
Hong Kong Open 2014	Hong Kong	Hong Kong	World Series Gold	$77,000	27-31 August 2014	(Malaysia) Nicol David
US Open 2014	United States	Philadelphia	World Series Platinum	$115,000	13–18 October 2014	(Malaysia) Nicol David
World Championship 2014	Egypt	Cairo	World Championship	$150,000	15–20 December 2014	(Malaysia) Nicol David

== World Series Standings 2014 ==
Performance Table Legend
10	1st Round	15	Round of 16
25	Quarterfinalist	40	Semifinalist
65	Runner-up	100	Winner

Top 16 World Series Standings 2014
Rank	Player	Number of Tournament	World Open (2013)	British Open	Malaysian Open	Hong Kong Open	US Open	World Championship	Total Points
Rank	Player	Number of Tournament	MAS (Malaysia)	ENG (England)	MAS (Malaysia)	HKG (Hong Kong)	USA (United States)	EGY (Egypt)	Total Points
1	(Malaysia) Nicol David	6	40	100	40	100	100	100	480
2	(Egypt) Raneem El Weleily	5	40	40	100	-	40	65	285
3	(England) Laura Massaro	6	100	65	15	40	25	25	270
4	(Egypt) Nour El Tayeb	5	10	10	65	65	-	25	175
5	(England) Alison Waters	6	15	40	10	25	25	40	155
6	(Egypt) Nour El Sherbini	4	65	10	-	-	65	10	150
7	(France) Camille Serme	6	25	15	10	25	40	25	140
8	(Malaysia) Low Wee Wern	6	25	25	15	15	25	25	130
9	(Egypt) Omneya Abdel Kawy	6	15	25	15	15	15	40	125
10	(Hong Kong) Annie Au	6	10	15	25	15	15	15	95
11	(England) Sarah-Jane Perry	6	15	15	25	15	10	15	95
12	(Australia) Rachael Grinham	6	10	10	15	25	15	15	90
13	(Hong Kong) Joey Chan	6	10	10	15	25	10	10	80
14	(England) Jenny Duncalf	6	15	10	15	15	15	10	80
15	(Republic of Ireland) Madeline Perry	5	25	10	25	-	10	10	80
16	(United States) Amanda Sobhy	2	-	-	40	40	-	-	80

== See also ==
- PSA World Series 2014
- WSA World Tour 2014
- Official Women's Squash World Ranking
