= Women's Malaysian Open Squash Championships 2014 =

Athletic competition

Malaysian Open 2014
- 36th WSA Malaysian Open

Details
- Event name: Malaysian Open Squash Championships 2014
- Location: Kuala Lumpur Malaysia
- Venue: National Squash Centre; Nu Sentral Mall
- Website www.squashsite.co.uk/2009/malaysian2014.htm

Women's Winner
- Category: World Series Gold
- Prize money: $70,000
- Year: World Tour 2014

The Women's Malaysian Open Squash Championships 2014 is the women's edition of the 2014 Malaysian Open Squash Championships, which is a tournament of the WSA World Series event Gold (prize money: $70 000 ). The event took place in Kuala Lumpur in Malaysia from 18 to 23 August. Raneem El Weleily won her second Malaysian Open trophy, beating Nour El Tayeb in the final.

== Prize money and ranking points ==
For 2014, the prize purse was $70,000. The prize money and points breakdown is as follows:

Prize money Malaysian Open (2014)
Event	W	F	SF	QF	2R	1R
Points (WSA)	3360	2310	1365	735	365,5	210
Prize money	$10,200	$6,900	$4,050	$2,400	$1,350	$750

== Seeds ==
1. (Malaysia) Nicol David (semifinals)
2. (England) Laura Massaro (second round)
3. (Egypt) Raneem El Weleily (champion)
4. (France) Camille Serme (first round)
5. (England) Alison Waters (first round)
6. (Malaysia) Low Wee Wern (second round)
7. (Hong Kong) Annie Au (quarterfinals)
8. (Republic of Ireland) Madeline Perry (quarterfinals)
9. (Egypt) Omneya Abdel Kawy
10. (United States) Amanda Sobhy (semifinals)
11. (England) Jenny Duncalf (second round)
12. (Australia) Rachael Grinham (second round)
13. (England) Sarah-Jane Perry (quarterfinals)
14. (India) Joshna Chinappa (second round)
15. (Hong Kong) Joey Chan (second round)
16. (Egypt) Nour El Tayeb (final)

== Draw and results ==
First round
1	(Malaysia) Nicol David	11	11	11
Q	(Hong Kong) Liu Tsz-Ling	3	2	3
14	(India) Joshna Chinappa	11	8	11	11
(Denmark) Line Hansen	8	11	7	9
7	(Hong Kong) Annie Au	9	11	11	11
(England) Victoria Lust	11	3	6	6
9	(Egypt) Omneya Abdel Kawy	12	11	11
Q	(Wales) Deon Saffery	10	3	6
3	(Egypt) Raneem El Weleily	11	11	3	11
(Wales) Tesni Evans	8	6	11	5
15	(Hong Kong) Joey Chan	11	4	11	5	11
(England) Emily Whitlock	8	11	8	11	8
6	(Malaysia) Low Wee Wern	11	11	10	11
(Egypt) Heba El Torky	8	5	12	8
13	(England) Sarah-Jane Perry	11	11	11
(Egypt) Nouran Ahmed Gohar	9	6	8
Q	(Mexico) Samantha Terán	7	1	6
10	(United States) Amanda Sobhy	11	11	11
WC	(Malaysia) Delia Arnold	7	11	6	11	11
5	(England) Alison Waters	11	6	11	7	9
Q	(Hong Kong) Tong Tsz-Wing	6	6	6
11	(England) Jenny Duncalf	11	11	11
Q	(Egypt) Habiba Mohamed	11	6	7	11	11
4	(France) Camille Serme	6	11	11	9	8
Q	(England) Lisa Aitken	6	6	9
12	(Australia) Rachael Grinham	11	11	11
(Republic of Ireland) Aisling Blake	3	6	3
8	(Republic of Ireland) Madeline Perry	11	11	11
Q	(Japan) Misaki Kobayashi	8	3	9
16	(Egypt) Nour El Tayeb	11	11	11
Q	(United States) Latasha Khan	6	2	4
2	(England) Laura Massaro	11	11	11

Second round
1	(Malaysia) Nicol David	11	11	11
14	(India) Joshna Chinappa	4	3	8
7	(Hong Kong) Annie Au	11	11	11
9	(Egypt) Omneya Abdel Kawy	8	7	5
3	(Egypt) Raneem El Weleily	11	11	11
15	(Hong Kong) Joey Chan	2	9	8
6	(Malaysia) Low Wee Wern	3	11	11	9
13	(England) Sarah-Jane Perry	11	11	9	11
10	(United States) Amanda Sobhy	14	11	11
WC	(Malaysia) Delia Arnold	12	9	5
11	(England) Jenny Duncalf	7	11	9	7
Q	(Egypt) Habiba Mohamed	11	6	11	11
12	(Australia) Rachael Grinham	12	5	9	11	9
8	(Republic of Ireland) Madeline Perry	10	11	11	6	11
16	(Egypt) Nour El Tayeb	11	11	6	11
2	(England) Laura Massaro	7	4	11	4

Quarter finals
1	(Malaysia) Nicol David	11	11	11
7	(Hong Kong) Annie Au	9	5	5
3	(Egypt) Raneem El Weleily	11	6	12	13	11
13	(England) Sarah-Jane Perry	4	11	10	15	6
10	(United States) Amanda Sobhy	11	11	11
Q	(Egypt) Habiba Mohamed	5	6	7
8	(Republic of Ireland) Madeline Perry	9	15	11	2	rtd
16	(Egypt) Nour El Tayeb	11	17	2	9

Semi finals
1	(Malaysia) Nicol David	11	6	8	11
3	(Egypt) Raneem El Weleily	7	11	11	13
Final
3	(Egypt) Raneem El Weleily	7	11	12	2	11
16	(Egypt) Nour El Tayeb	11	3	10	11	7
10	(United States) Amanda Sobhy	9	9	3
16	(Egypt) Nour El Tayeb	11	11	11

== See also ==
- WSA World Series 2014
- Malaysian Open Squash Championships
- Men's Malaysian Open Squash Championships 2014

Preceded by British Open; England (Hull); 2014	WSA World Series 2014; Malaysian Open; Malaysia (Kuala Lumpur); 2014	Succeeded by Hong Kong Open; Hong Kong; 2014
