= Carol Weymuller Open 2014 =

- 39th Carol Weymuller Open

Details
- Event name: Carol Weymuller Open 2014
- Location: Brooklyn, New York, United States
- Venue: The Heights Casino
- Website www.squashsite.co.uk/2009/carolweymuller2014.htm

Women's Winner
- Category: Gold 50
- Prize money: $50,000
- Year: World Tour 2014

The Carol Weymuller Open 2014 is the women's edition of the 2014 Carol Weymuller Open, which is a tournament of the WSA World Tour event Gold (Prize money : 50 000 $). The event took place at The Heights Casino in Brooklyn, New York in the United States from 1 October to 6 October. Alison Waters won her first Carol Weymuller Open trophy, beating Omneya Abdel Kawy in the final.

== Prize money and ranking points ==
For 2014, the prize purse was $50,000. The prize money and points breakdown is as follows:

Prize Money Carol Weymuller Open (2014)
Event	W	F	SF	QF	1R
Points (WSA)	2450	1610	980	595	350
Prize money	$8,550	$5,850	$3,825	$2,365	$1,350

== Seeds ==
1. (England) Laura Massaro (semifinals)
2. (Egypt) Raneem El Weleily (semifinals)
3. (England) Alison Waters (champion)
4. (Republic of Ireland) Madeline Perry (first round)
5. (Egypt) Omneya Abdel Kawy (final)
6. (England) Jenny Duncalf (first round)
7. (Australia) Rachael Grinham (first round)
8. (United States) Amanda Sobhy (first round)

== Draw and results ==
First round
1	(England) Laura Massaro	11	11	11
(England) Sarah Kippax	5	9	8
6	(England) Jenny Duncalf	6	9	10
Q	(Egypt) Salma Hany Ibrahim	11	11	12
4	(Republic of Ireland) Madeline Perry	2	4	4
Q	(Egypt) Nour El Tayeb	11	11	11
5	(Egypt) Omneya Abdel Kawy	11	11	11
Q	(Canada) Samantha Cornett	5	6	3
(Guyana) Nicolette Fernandes	7	11	11	6	11
7	(Australia) Rachael Grinham	11	6	8	11	9
(Denmark) Line Hansen	6	8	5
3	(England) Alison Waters	11	11	11
(England) Emma Beddoes	11	12	11
8	(United States) Amanda Sobhy	7	10	4
Q	(Mexico) Samantha Terán	5	7	4
2	(Egypt) Raneem El Weleily	11	11	11

Quarter finals
1	(England) Laura Massaro	11	11	9	9	11
Q	(Egypt) Salma Hany Ibrahim	6	8	11	11	4
Q	(Egypt) Nour El Tayeb	8	11	8	9
5	(Egypt) Omneya Abdel Kawy	11	4	11	11
(Guyana) Nicolette Fernandes	12	2	4
3	(England) Alison Waters	14	11	11
(England) Emma Beddoes	15	6	11	4	4
2	(Egypt) Raneem El Weleily	13	11	7	11	11

Semi finals
1	(England) Laura Massaro	2	11	8	5
5	(Egypt) Omneya Abdel Kawy	11	7	11	11
3	(England) Alison Waters	7	9	11	12	11
2	(Egypt) Raneem El Weleily	11	11	7	10	2

Final
5	(Egypt) Omneya Abdel Kawy	11	10	5	10
3	(England) Alison Waters	9	12	11	12

== See also ==
- WSA World Tour 2014
- Carol Weymuller Open
