= 2014 Women's World Open Squash Championship =

Women's World Championship 2014
- 31st WSA World Squash Championship
- Location: Cairo, Egypt
- Date(s): December 15–20, 2014
- Website squashsite.co.uk - World Championship 2014

WSA World Tour
- Category: World Championships
- Prize money: $165,000

Results
- Champion: (Malaysia) Nicol David
- Runner-up: (Egypt) Raneem El Weleily
- Semi-finalists: (England) Alison Waters (Egypt) Omneya Abdel Kawy

The 2014 Women's World Open Squash Championship is the women's edition of the 2014 World Championships, which serves as the individual world championship for squash players. The event took place in Cairo, Egypt from December 15 to 20, 2014. Nicol David won her eighth World Open title, beating Raneem El Weleily in the final.

== Prize money and ranking points ==
For 2014, the prize purse was $150,000. The prize money and points breakdown is as follows:

Prize Money World Championship (2014)
Event	W	F	SF	QF	2R	1R
Points (WSA)	5300	3630	2150	1150	575	330
Prize money	$22,950	$15,525	$9,115	$5,400	$3,035	$1,690

== Seeds ==
1. (Malaysia) Nicol David (champion)
2. (England) Laura Massaro (quarterfinals)
3. (Egypt) Raneem El Weleily (final)
4. (Egypt) Nour El Sherbini (first round)
5. (England) Alison Waters (semifinals)
6. (France) Camille Serme (quarterfinals)
7. (Malaysia) Low Wee Wern (quarterfinals)
8. (Egypt) Nour El Tayeb (quarterfinals)
9. (Hong Kong) Annie Au (second round)
10. (Egypt) Omneya Abdel Kawy (semifinals)
11. (Australia) Rachael Grinham (second round)
12. (Republic of Ireland) Madeline Perry (first round)
13. (England) Jenny Duncalf (first round)
14. (India) Dipika Pallikal (second round)
15. (England) Sarah-Jane Perry (second round)
16. (England) Emma Beddoes (second round)

== Draw and results ==
First round
1	(Malaysia) Nicol David	11	11	11
Q	(Egypt) Yathreb Adel	9	6	3
13	(England) Jenny Duncalf	8	5	5
Q	(England) Emily Whitlock	11	11	11
6	(France) Camille Serme	11	8	11	11
Q	(Egypt) Nouran El Torky	2	11	5	7
16	(England) Emma Beddoes	11	11	11
Q	(Malaysia) Delia Arnold	5	4	7
4	(Egypt) Nour El Sherbini	6	10	11	11
(Egypt) Nouran Gohar	11	12	4	13
10	(Egypt) Omneya Abdel Kawy	11	6	11	14
(England) Sarah Kippax	8	11	9	12
7	(Malaysia) Low Wee Wern	9	11	9	11	11
(Guyana) Nicolette Fernandes	11	7	11	7	2
12	(Republic of Ireland) Madeline Perry	12	7	11	7
(India) Joshna Chinappa	14	11	4	11
Q	(Wales) Tesni Evans	4	11	6	6
11	(Australia) Rachael Grinham	11	5	11	11
WC	(Egypt) Mayar Hany Mohamed	5	5	5
8	(Egypt) Nour El Tayeb	11	11	11
Q	(Mexico) Samantha Terán	11	12	6	4	7
14	(India) Dipika Pallikal	9	10	11	11	11
(Egypt) Habiba Mohamed	9	6	11	7
3	(Egypt) Raneem El Weleily	11	11	9	11
(Hong Kong) Joey Chan	8	11	11	3	5
15	(England) Sarah-Jane Perry	11	7	9	11	11
Q	(Egypt) Heba El Torky	8	6	6
5	(England) Alison Waters	11	11	11
(Denmark) Line Hansen	11	4	11	4
9	(Hong Kong) Annie Au	9	11	13	11
Q	(Egypt) Mariam Metwally	3	11	11	7
2	(England) Laura Massaro	11	13	8	11

Second round
1	(Malaysia) Nicol David	12	11	11
Q	(England) Emily Whitlock	10	9	1
6	(France) Camille Serme	11	11	11	11
16	(England) Emma Beddoes	5	13	4	4
(Egypt) Nouran Ahmed Gohar	11	6	11
10	(Egypt) Omneya Abdel Kawy	13	11	13
7	(Malaysia) Low Wee Wern	6	11	11	11	11
(India) Joshna Chinappa	11	3	13	7	8
11	(Australia) Rachael Grinham	8	11	8	3
8	(Egypt) Nour El Tayeb	11	9	11	11
14	(India) Dipika Pallikal	11	5	3	6
3	(Egypt) Raneem El Weleily	7	11	11	11
15	(England) Sarah-Jane Perry	7	6	3
5	(England) Alison Waters	11	11	11
9	(Hong Kong) Annie Au	10	10	2
2	(England) Laura Massaro	12	12	11

Quarter finals
1	(Malaysia) Nicol David	11	11	13
6	(France) Camille Serme	9	7	11
10	(Egypt) Omneya Abdel Kawy	12	11	11
7	(Malaysia) Low Wee Wern	10	3	4
8	(Egypt) Nour El Tayeb	7	9	13	5
3	(Egypt) Raneem El Weleily	11	11	11	11
5	(England) Alison Waters	12	11	11	11
2	(England) Laura Massaro	14	2	7	9

Semi finals
1	(Malaysia) Nicol David	11	9	8	11	11
10	(Egypt) Omneya Abdel Kawy	9	11	11	5	5
Final
1	(Malaysia) Nicol David	5	11	7	14	11
3	(Egypt) Raneem El Weleily	11	8	11	12	5
3	(Egypt) Raneem El Weleily	11	11	9	11
5	(England) Alison Waters	6	9	11	5

== See also ==
- World Championship
- 2014 Men's World Open Squash Championship
- 2014 Women's World Team Squash Championships

Preceded by Malaysia (Penang); 2013	World Championships; Egypt (Cairo); 2014	Succeeded by Kuala Lumpur, Malaysia; 2015
Preceded by US Open; United States (Philadelphia); 2014	WSA World Series 2014; World Championship; Egypt (Cairo); 2014	Succeeded by Tournament of Champions; United States (New York); 2015
