= Women's Windy City Open 2014 =

Windy City Open 2014
- 3rd WSA Windy City Open

Details
- Event name: Guggenheim Partners MetroSquash Windy City Open
- Location: Chicago United States
- Venue: University Club of Chicago
- Website www.windycityopen.com

Women's Winner
- Category: Gold 50
- Prize money: $50,000
- Year: World Tour 2014

The Women's Windy City Open 2014 is the women's edition of the 2014 Windy City Open, which is a tournament of the WSA World Tour event International (Prize money : $50 000 ). The event took place at the University Club of Chicago in Chicago in the United States from 26 February to 3 March. Laura Massaro won her first Windy City Open trophy, beating Raneem El Weleily in the final.

== Prize money and ranking points ==
For 2014, the prize purse was $50,000. The prize money and points breakdown is as follows:

Prize Money Windy City Open (2014)
Event	W	F	SF	QF	1R
Points (WSA)	2450	1610	980	595	350
Prize money	$8,550	$5,850	$3,825	$2,365	$1,350

== Seeds ==
1. (England) Laura Massaro (champion)
2. (Egypt) Raneem El Weleily (final)
3. (England) Alison Waters (quarterfinals)
4. (New Zealand) Joelle King (semifinals)
5. (Malaysia) Low Wee Wern (quarterfinals)
6. (Republic of Ireland) Madeline Perry (first round)
7. (France) Camille Serme (semifinals)
8. (Australia) Kasey Brown (first round)

== Draw and results ==
First round
1	(England) Laura Massaro	11	11	11
Q	(England) Emily Whitlock	7	4	2
8	(Australia) Kasey Brown	5	4	8
(Hong Kong) Annie Au	11	11	11
3	(England) Alison Waters	11	11	11
Q	(Hong Kong) Joey Chan	8	7	5
7	(France) Camille Serme	11	8	11	12
(Egypt) Omneya Abdel Kawy	8	11	5	10
Q	(England) Emma Beddoes	11	5	11	11
6	(Republic of Ireland) Madeline Perry	9	11	4	8
WC	(Republic of Ireland) Aisling Blake	5	4	6
4	(New Zealand) Joelle King	11	11	11
(India) Dipika Pallikal	5	11	7	14	6
5	(Malaysia) Low Wee Wern	11	8	11	12	11
Q	(England) Sarah Kippax	13	11	3	4	7
2	(Egypt) Raneem El Weleily	12	9	11	11	11

1* Quarter finals 2*
1	(England) Laura Massaro	8	11	12	11
(Hong Kong) Annie Au	11	8	10	7
3	(England) Alison Waters	4	12	6
7	(France) Camille Serme	11	14	11
Q	(England) Emma Beddoes	4	12	5	11	2
4	(New Zealand) Joelle King	11	10	11	9	11
5	(Malaysia) Low Wee Wern	8	5	6
2	(Egypt) Raneem El Weleily	11	11	11

Semi finals *
1	(England) Laura Massaro	11	12	9	11	11
7	(France) Camille Serme	9	14	11	6	6
4	(New Zealand) Joelle King	10	8	7
2	(Egypt) Raneem El Weleily	12	11	11

Final
1	(England) Laura Massaro *	9	11	11	3	11
2	(Egypt) Raneem El Weleily	11	8	9	11	6

== See also ==
- WSA World Tour 2014
- Men's Windy City Open 2014
- Metro Squash Windy City Open
