= Carol Weymuller Open 2015 =

- 40th Carol Weymuller Open

Details
- Event name: Carol Weymuller Open 2015
- Location: Brooklyn, New York, United States
- Venue: The Heights Casino
- Website www.squashsite.co.uk/2009/carolweymuller2015.htm

Men's Winner
- Category: International 50
- Prize money: $50,000
- Year: World Tour 2015

The Carol Weymuller Open 2015 is the women's edition of the 2015 Carol Weymuller Open, which is a tournament of the PSA World Tour event International (Prize money : $50 000 ). The event took place at The Heights Casino in Brooklyn, New York in the United States from 1 October to 5 October. Nour El Sherbini won her first Carol Weymuller Open trophy, beating Joelle King in the final.

== Prize money and ranking points ==
For 2014, the prize purse was $50,000. The prize money and points breakdown is as follows:

Prize Money Carol Weymuller Open (2015)
Event	W	F	SF	QF	1R
Points (PSA)	2450	1610	980	595	350
Prize money	$8,550	$5,850	$3,825	$2,365	$1,350

== Seeds ==
1. (Egypt) Raneem El Weleily (semifinals)
2. (England) Laura Massaro (first round)
3. (England) Alison Waters (first round)
4. (Egypt) Omneya Abdel Kawy (quarterfinals)
5. (Egypt) Nour El Sherbini (champion)
6. (England) Sarah-Jane Perry (quarterfinals)
7. (England) Emma Beddoes (first round)
8. (Australia) Rachael Grinham (first round)

== Draw and results ==
First round
1	(Egypt) Raneem El Weleily	11	11	5	7	11
(India) Dipika Pallikal	6	7	11	11	5
Q	(Hong Kong) Joey Chan	11	11	10	12
8	(Australia) Rachael Grinham	9	5	12	10
6	(Egypt) Nour El Sherbini	11	11	11
(Malaysia) Delia Arnold	6	7	9
(England) Jenny Duncalf	10	11	3	11	3
4	(Egypt) Omneya Abdel Kawy	12	9	11	9	11
3	(England) Alison Waters	6	11	12	8
WC	(New Zealand) Joelle King	11	8	14	11
Q	(Egypt) Kanzy Emad El Defrawy	11	9	2	9
6	(England) Sarah-Jane Perry	5	11	11	11
7	(England) Emma Beddoes	11	14	7	4
Q	(India) Joshna Chinappa	4	16	11	11
Q	(Egypt) Salma Hany Ibrahim	12	8	11	4	11
2	(England) Laura Massaro	10	11	9	11	7

Quarter finals
1	(Egypt) Raneem El Weleily	15	11	11
Q	(Hong Kong) Joey Chan	13	7	8
6	(Egypt) Nour El Sherbini	10	11	11	12
4	(Egypt) Omneya Abdel Kawy	12	1	4	10
WC	(New Zealand) Joelle King	11	13	11
6	(England) Sarah-Jane Perry	9	11	9
Q	(India) Joshna Chinappa	11	8	5	11	11
Q	(Egypt) Salma Hany Ibrahim	9	11	11	8	9

Semi finals
1	(Egypt) Raneem El Weleily	12	4	9	4
6	(Egypt) Nour El Sherbini	10	11	11	11
WC	(New Zealand) Joelle King	11	9	11	11
Q	(India) Joshna Chinappa	4	11	4	8

Final
6	(Egypt) Nour El Sherbini	11	11	11
WC	(New Zealand) Joelle King	5	6	3

== See also ==
- 2015 PSA World Tour
- Carol Weymuller Open
