= Cleveland Classic 2014 =

Cleveland Squash Classic 2014
- 6th Cleveland Classic

Details
- Event name: Cleveland Squash Classic 2014
- Location: Cleveland, Ohio, United States
- Venue: Cleveland Racket Club
- Website www.squashsite.co.uk/2009/clevelandclassic2014.htm

Women's Winner
- Category: Gold 50
- Prize money: $50,000
- Year: World Tour 2014

The Cleveland Squash Classic 2014 is the women's edition of the 2014 Cleveland Classic, which is a tournament of the WSA World Tour event International (Prize money : 50 000 $). The event took place at the Cleveland Racket Club in Cleveland, Ohio in United States from 30 January to 4 February. Nicol David won her second Cleveland Classic trophy, beating Annie Au in the final.

== Prize money and ranking points ==
For 2014, the prize purse was $50,000. The prize money and points breakdown is as follows:

Prize Money Cleveland Classic (2014)
Event	W	F	SF	QF	1R
Points (WSA)	2450	1610	980	595	350
Prize money	$8,550	$5,850	$3,825	$2,365	$1,350

== Seeds ==
1. (Malaysia) Nicol David (champion)
2. (England) Laura Massaro (quarterfinals)
3. (Egypt) Raneem El Weleily (quarterfinals)
4. (England) Alison Waters (semifinals)
5. (France) Camille Serme (quarterfinals)
6. (New Zealand) Joelle King (first round)
7. (England) Jenny Duncalf (first round)
8. (Malaysia) Low Wee Wern (first round)

== Draw and results ==
First round
1	(Malaysia) Nicol David	11	11	11
Q	(Egypt) Nour El Sherbini	2	8	3
5	(France) Camille Serme	9	11	11	11
Q	(England) Sarah Kippax	11	6	8	5
3	(Egypt) Raneem El Weleily	11	10	11	11
(Australia) Kasey Brown	8	12	5	7
6	(New Zealand) Joelle King	6	6	5
Q	(Egypt) Nour El Tayeb	11	11	11
(Egypt) Omneya Abdel Kawy	11	11	8	11
8	(Malaysia) Low Wee Wern	4	9	11	8
(India) Dipika Pallikal	10	4	9
4	(England) Alison Waters	11	11	11
Q	(Hong Kong) Annie Au	11	11	11
7	(England) Jenny Duncalf	5	9	3
(Republic of Ireland) Madeline Perry	17	4	11	5	5
2	(England) Laura Massaro	15	11	6	11	11

Quarter finals
1	(Malaysia) Nicol David	11	11	11
5	(France) Camille Serme	5	6	6
3	(Egypt) Raneem El Weleily	11	9	4	10
Q	(Egypt) Nour El Tayeb	8	11	11	12
(Egypt) Omneya Abdel Kawy	11	11	13	9	5
4	(England) Alison Waters	8	5	15	11	11
Q	(Hong Kong) Annie Au	11	12	14
2	(England) Laura Massaro	5	10	12

Semi finals
1	(Malaysia) Nicol David	11	12	11
Q	(Egypt) Nour El Tayeb	7	10	4
4	(England) Alison Waters	11	7	11	2	10
Q	(Hong Kong) Annie Au	6	11	9	11	12

Final
1	(Malaysia) Nicol David	13	11	11
Q	(Hong Kong) Annie Au	11	5	6

== See also ==
- Cleveland Classic
- WSA World Tour 2014
