= Carol Weymuller Open =

Details
- Event name: Carol Weymuller Open
- Location: Brooklyn, New York, United States
- Venue: The Heights Casino

Women's Winner
- Category: World Tour Bronze
- Prize money: $51,250
- Most recent champion(s): (England) Georgina Kennedy
- Current: Carol Weymuller Open 2023

The Carol Weymuller Open is an annual women's squash tournament that takes place in Brooklyn, New York, United States in September. It is part of the WSA World Tour.

== Past Results ==
=== Women's ===
Year	Champion	Runner-up	Score in final
2023	(England) Georgina Kennedy	(United States) Olivia Fiechter	11-7, 12-10, 12-10
2022	(Egypt) Rowan Elaraby	(Malaysia) Sivasangari Subramaniam	11-7, 6-11, 11-9, 11-6
2021	No competition		
2020	(Egypt) Nouran Gohar	(Egypt) Nour El Tayeb	11-9, 11-5, 11-2
2019	No competition		
2018	(Egypt) Nour El Tayeb	(England) Sarah-Jane Perry	11-8, 10-12, 11-6, 11-8
2017	(Egypt) Nour El Sherbini	(New Zealand) Joelle King	11-7, 11-5, 11-3
2016	(Egypt) Nour El Sherbini	(England) Alison Waters	13-11, 11-6, 11-3
2015	(Egypt) Nour El Sherbini	(New Zealand) Joelle King	11-5, 11-6, 11-3
2014	(England) Alison Waters	(Egypt) Omneya Abdel Kawy	9-11, 12-10, 11-2, 12-10
2013	(Malaysia) Nicol David	(France) Camille Serme	12-10, 11-2, 11-5
2012	(England) Laura Massaro	(Egypt) Raneem El Weleily	11-8, 11-4, 11-5
2011	(Egypt) Raneem El Weleily	(England) Jenny Duncalf	11-7, 15-13, 11-4
2010	(England) Jenny Duncalf	(England) Laura Massaro	11-6, 11-1, 11-6
2009	(England) Jenny Duncalf	(England) Alison Waters	11-7, 11-9, 6-11, 11-9
2008	(United States) Natalie Grainger	(New Zealand) Shelley Kitchen	9-11, 11-8, 11-6, 11-1
2007	(United States) Natalie Grainger	(England) Jenny Duncalf	9-3, 9-4, 9-6
2006	(Australia) Rachael Grinham	(United States) Natalie Grainger	6-9, 9-6, 9-1, 1-9, 9-4
2005	(Malaysia) Nicol David	(Australia) Natalie Grinham	5-9, 9-6, 9-4, 9-3
2004	(United States) Natalie Grainger	(England) Linda Elriani	6-9, 9-4, 9-6, 9-4
2003	(England) Cassie Jackman	(New Zealand) Carol Owens	9-5, 5-9, 4-9, 9-7, 9-5
2002	(New Zealand) Carol Owens	(England) Tania Bailey	9-7, 9-1, 10-8
2001	(Australia) Sarah Fitz-Gerald	(New Zealand) Carol Owens	
2000	(New Zealand) Leilani Joyce	(England) Linda Elriani	9-5, 9-2, 9-1
1999	(Australia) Michelle Martin	(England) Linda Elriani	10-8, 9-5, 7-9, 9-5
1998	(Australia) Michelle Martin	(Australia) Sarah Fitz-Gerald	9-2, 9-4, 9-3
1997	(Australia) Sarah Fitz-Gerald	(Australia) Michelle Martin	9-3, 7-9, 9-0, 3-9, 10-8
1996	(England) Cassie Jackman	(Australia) Liz Irving	10-8, 9-6, 9-2
1995	(Australia) Michelle Martin	(New Zealand) Carol Owens	9-2, 9-2, 9-6
1994	(England) Cassie Jackman	(United States) Demer Holleran	
1993	(England) Fiona Geaves	(Australia) Vicki Cardwell	
1992	(United States) Demer Holleran		
1991	(United States) Demer Holleran		
1990	(United States) Elle Pierce		
1989	(United States) Karen Kelso		
1988	No competition		
1987	(United States) Karen Kelso		
1986	(United States) Alicia McConnell		
1985	(United States) Alicia McConnell		
1984	(United States) Alicia McConnell		
1983	(United States) Alicia McConnell		
1982	(United States) Alicia McConnell		
1981	(United States) Alicia McConnell		
1980	(United States) Alicia McConnell		
1979	(United States) Barbara Maltby		
1978	(United States) Barbara Maltby		
1977	(United States) Barbara Maltby		
1976	(United States) Barbara Maltby		
1975	(United States) Barbara Maltby		
