= Texas Open 2014 =

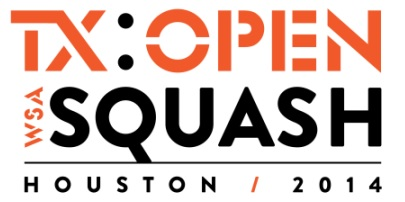

Details
- Event name: Texas Open 2014
- Location: Houston United States
- Website www.dallassquash.org/TexasOpen

Women's Winner
- Category: Gold 50
- Prize money: $50,000
- Year: World Tour 2014

The Texas Open 2014 is the women's edition of the 2014 Texas Open, which is a tournament of the WSA World Tour event International (prize money: 50 000 $). The event took place in Houston in the United States from the 8th of April to the 13th April. Nour El Sherbini won her first Texas Open trophy, beating Dipika Pallikal in the final.

== Prize money and ranking points ==
For 2014, the prize purse was $50,000. The prize money and points breakdown is as follows:

Prize money Texas Open (2014)
Event	W	F	SF	QF	1R
Points (WSA)	2450	1610	980	595	350
Prize money	$8,550	$5,850	$3,825	$2,365	$1,350

== Seeds ==
1. (Malaysia) Low Wee Wern (quarterfinals)
2. (Republic of Ireland) Madeline Perry (semifinals)
3. (France) Camille Serme (semifinals)
4. (India) Dipika Pallikal (final)
5. (Hong Kong) Annie Au (first round)
6. (Australia) Kasey Brown (first round)
7. (Egypt) Omneya Abdel Kawy (first round)
8. (Australia) Rachael Grinham (quarterfinals)

== Draw and results ==
First round
1	(Malaysia) Low Wee Wern	11	11	9	11
(England) Sarah-Jane Perry	9	9	11	7
7	(Egypt) Omneya Abdel Kawy	4	4	10
Q	(Egypt) Nour El Sherbini	11	11	12
3	(France) Camille Serme	10	11	11	11
(United States) Amanda Sobhy	12	6	4	8
8	(Australia) Rachael Grinham	11	11	11
(India) Joshna Chinappa	7	5	5
(Guyana) Nicolette Fernandes	12	10	11	8	11
5	(Hong Kong) Annie Au	10	12	5	11	8
Q	(Australia) Donna Urquhart	10	8	5
4	(India) Dipika Pallikal	11	11	11
Q	(England) Emma Beddoes	11	11	4	11
6	(Australia) Kasey Brown	4	5	11	8
Q	(Hong Kong) Joey Chan	11	4	6	10
2	(Republic of Ireland) Madeline Perry	7	11	11	11

Quarter finals
1	(Malaysia) Low Wee Wern	3	8	11	6
Q	(Egypt) Nour El Sherbini	11	11	10	11
3	(France) Camille Serme	8	17	11	11
8	(Australia) Rachael Grinham	11	15	6	4
(Guyana) Nicolette Fernandes	4	6	12	12	5
4	(India) Dipika Pallikal	11	11	10	10	11
Q	(England) Emma Beddoes	7	11	6	8
2	(Republic of Ireland) Madeline Perry	11	9	11	11

Semi finals
Q	(Egypt) Nour El Sherbini	11	11	9	11
3	(France) Camille Serme	5	9	11	6
4	(India) Dipika Pallikal	11	11	13	10	11
2	(Republic of Ireland) Madeline Perry	7	13	11	12	4

Final
Q	(Egypt) Nour El Sherbini	11	5	11	11
4	(India) Dipika Pallikal	7	11	7	8

== See also ==
- WSA World Tour 2014
- Texas Open (squash)
