= Women's Tournament of Champions 2014 =

Tournament of Champions 2014
- 10th WSA Tournament of Champions

Details
- Event name: Tournament of Champions 2014
- Location: New York City United States
- Venue: Grand Central Terminal
- Website www.tocsquash.com

Women's Winner
- Category: Gold 50
- Prize money: $50,000
- Year: World Tour 2014

The Women's Tournament of Champions 2014 is the women's edition of the 2014 Tournament of Champions, which is a tournament of the WSA World Tour event Gold (prize money: 50 000 $). The event took place at the Grand Central Terminal in New York City in the United States from 18 January to 24 January. Nicol David won her first Tournament of Champions trophy, beating Laura Massaro in the final.

== Prize money and ranking points ==
For 2014, the prize purse was $50,000. The prize money and points breakdown is as follows:

Prize money Tournament of Champions (2014)
| Event | W | F | SF | QF | 1R |
| Points (WSA) | 2450 | 1610 | 980 | 595 | 350 |
| Prize money | $8,550 | $5,850 | $3,825 | $2,365 | $1,350 |

== Seeds ==
1. (Malaysia) Nicol David (champion)
2. (England) Laura Massaro (final)
3. (Egypt) Raneem El Weleily (first round)
4. (England) Alison Waters (semifinals)
5. (France) Camille Serme (semifinals)
6. (New Zealand) Joelle King (quarterfinals)
7. (England) Jenny Duncalf (first round)
8. (Malaysia) Low Wee Wern (quarterfinals)

== Draw and results ==
First round
1 | (Malaysia) Nicol David | 11 | 11 | 11
Q | (Hong Kong) Annie Au | 4 | 4 | 6
8 | (Malaysia) Low Wee Wern | 11 | 11 | 11
WC | (United States) Latasha Khan | 6 | 7 | 5
4 | (England) Alison Waters | 11 | 11 | 11
Q | (United States) Amanda Sobhy | 3 | 9 | 6
7 | (England) Jenny Duncalf | 5 | 9 | 11 | 11 | 4
Q | (England) Sarah-Jane Perry | 11 | 11 | 8 | 9 | 11
(Netherlands) Natalie Grinham | 13 | 6 | 4 | 7
5 | (France) Camille Serme | 11 | 11 | 11 | 11
(Republic of Ireland) Madeline Perry | 8 | 4 | 11 | 11 | 11
3 | (Egypt) Raneem El Weleily | 11 | 11 | 6 | 6 | 9
(Australia) Kasey Brown | 2 | 7 | 7
6 | (New Zealand) Joelle King | 11 | 11 | 11
Q | (Australia) Rachael Grinham | 2 | 11 | 7 | 7
2 | (England) Laura Massaro | 11 | 8 | 11 | 11

Quarter finals
1 | (Malaysia) Nicol David | 11 | 11 | 11
8 | (Malaysia) Low Wee Wern | 5 | 3 | 9
4 | (England) Alison Waters | 11 | 11 | 11
Q | (England) Sarah-Jane Perry | 5 | 6 | 2
5 | (France) Camille Serme | 11 | 11 | 11 | 11
(Republic of Ireland) Madeline Perry | 8 | 4 | 13 | 8
6 | (New Zealand) Joelle King | 11 | 11 | 3 | 7
2 | (England) Laura Massaro | 9 | 13 | 11 | 11

Semi finals *
1 | (Malaysia) Nicol David | 11 | 11 | 12
4 | (England) Alison Waters | 8 | 8 | 10
5 | (France) Camille Serme | 5 | 11 | 6 | 9
2 | (England) Laura Massaro | 11 | 3 | 11 | 11

Final
1 | (Malaysia) Nicol David * | 11 | 13 | 11
2 | (England) Laura Massaro | 4 | 11 | 8

== See also ==
- WSA World Tour 2014
- Men's Tournament of Champions 2014
- Tournament of Champions (squash)
