= Women's China Squash Open 2014 =

China Squash Open 2014
- 7th WSA China Open

Details
- Event name: China Open 2014
- Location: Shanghai, China
- Venue: The Peninsula Shanghai
- Website www.squashsite.co.uk/2009/china2014.htm

Women's Winner
- Category: Gold 50
- Prize money: $50,000
- Year: World Tour 2014

The Women's China Squash Open 2014 is the women's edition of the 2014 China Squash Open, which is a tournament of the WSA World Tour event International (prize money: 50 000 $). The event took place in Shanghai in China from 2 to 7 September. Low Wee Wern won her third China Squash Open trophy, beating Camille Serme in the final.

== Prize money and ranking points ==
For 2014, the prize purse was $50,000. The prize money and points breakdown is as follows:

Prize money China Squash Open (2014)
Event	W	F	SF	QF	1R
Points (WSA)	2450	1610	980	595	350
Prize money	$8,550	$5,850	$3,825	$2,365	$1,350

== Seeds ==
1. (France) Camille Serme (final)
2. (England) Alison Waters (first round)
3. (Malaysia) Low Wee Wern (champion)
4. (Hong Kong) Annie Au (quarterfinals)
5. (India) Dipika Pallikal (quarterfinals)
6. (England) Jenny Duncalf (quarterfinals)
7. (Australia) Rachael Grinham (first round)
8. (England) Sarah Kippax (quarterfinals)

== Draw and results ==
First round
1	(France) Camille Serme	11	10	11	11
Q	(Malaysia) Delia Arnold	4	12	8	3
8	(England) Sarah Kippax	8	11	11	11
Q	(Wales) Tesni Evans	11	7	9	6
4	(Hong Kong) Annie Au	11	11	7	11
(England) Emma Beddoes	4	7	11	9
7	(Australia) Rachael Grinham	9	8	13	7
Q	(Egypt) Nouran Gohar	11	11	11	11
WC	(Hong Kong) Gu Jinyue	8	6	4
6	(England) Jenny Duncalf	11	11	11
(Guyana) Nicolette Fernandes	5	4	7
3	(Malaysia) Low Wee Wern	11	11	11
(Denmark) Line Hansen	11	4	10	11	6
5	(India) Dipika Pallikal	9	11	12	5	11
Q	(Egypt) Salma Hany Ibrahim	11	3	11	11
2	(England) Alison Waters	7	11	8	3

Quarter finals
1	(France) Camille Serme	11	11	11
8	(England) Sarah Kippax	6	5	8
4	(Hong Kong) Annie Au	9	2	6	8
Q	(Egypt) Nouran Gohar	11	10	11	11
6	(England) Jenny Duncalf	7	6	5
3	(Malaysia) Low Wee Wern	11	11	11
5	(India) Dipika Pallikal	8	7	5
Q	(Egypt) Salma Hany Ibrahim	11	11	11

Semi finals
1	(France) Camille Serme	11	11	11	11
Q	(Egypt) Nouran Gohar	13	8	1	7
3	(Malaysia) Low Wee Wern	11	11	11
Q	(Egypt) Salma Hany Ibrahim	8	2	9

Final
1	(France) Camille Serme	8	6	11	11	10
3	(Malaysia) Low Wee Wern	11	11	8	8	12

== See also ==
- WSA World Tour 2014
- China Squash Open
- Men's China Squash Open 2014
