= Women's Macau Open 2014 =

Squash tournament

Macau Open 2014
- 6th Macau Open

Details
- Event name: Macau Open 2014
- Location: Macau China
- Website www.squashsite.co.uk/2009/macau2014.htm

Women's Winner
- Category: Gold 50
- Prize money: $50,000
- Year: World Tour 2014

The Women's Macau Open 2014 is the women's edition of the 2014 Macau Open, which is a tournament of the WSA World Tour event Gold (prize money: 50,000 US dollars). The event took place in Macau in China from 21 to 26 October. Nicol David won her first Macau Open trophy, beating Raneem El Weleily in the final.

== Prize money and ranking points ==
For 2014, the prize purse is $50,000. The prize money and points breakdown was as follows:

Prize money Macau Open (2014)
Event	W	F	SF	QF	1R
Points (WSA)	2450	1610	980	595	350
Prize money	$8,550	$5,850	$3,825	$2,365	$1,350

== Seeds ==
1. (Malaysia) Nicol David (champion)
2. (Egypt) Raneem El Weleily (final)
3. (Egypt) Nour El Sherbini (first round)
4. (Hong Kong) Annie Au (quarterfinals)
5. (Republic of Ireland) Madeline Perry (first round)
6. (Australia) Rachael Grinham (semifinals)
7. (England) Jenny Duncalf (semifinals)
8. (England) Sarah-Jane Perry (quarterfinals)

== Draw and results ==
First round
1	(Malaysia) Nicol David	11	12	12
(India) Joshna Chinappa	8	10	10
5	(Republic of Ireland) Madeline Perry	11	3	8	8
Q	(Malaysia) Delia Arnold	7	11	11	11
3	(Egypt) Nour El Sherbini	9	6	7
(England) Emma Beddoes	11	11	11
7	(England) Jenny Duncalf	11	9	11	4	11
Q	(England) Victoria Lust	4	11	2	11	6
(Denmark) Line Hansen	9	4	8
6	(Australia) Rachael Grinham	11	11	11
WC	(Macau) Liu Kwai Chi	2	5	6
4	(Hong Kong) Annie Au	11	11	11
(Hong Kong) Joey Chan	9	3	10
8	(England) Sarah-Jane Perry	11	11	12
Q	(England) Emily Whitlock	11	3	4	7
2	(Egypt) Raneem El Weleily	4	11	11	11

Quarter finals
1	(Malaysia) Nicol David	11	11	12
Q	(Malaysia) Delia Arnold	4	9	10
(England) Emma Beddoes	5	6	6
7	(England) Jenny Duncalf	11	11	11
6	(Australia) Rachael Grinham	11	11	12
4	(Hong Kong) Annie Au	4	5	10
8	(England) Sarah-Jane Perry	10	11	6	5
2	(Egypt) Raneem El Weleily	12	7	11	11

Semi finals
1	(Malaysia) Nicol David	11	11	11
7	(England) Jenny Duncalf	8	6	6
6	(Australia) Rachael Grinham	3	4	3
2	(Egypt) Raneem El Weleily	11	11	11

Final
1	(Malaysia) Nicol David	11	11	11
2	(Egypt) Raneem El Weleily	8	2	8

== See also ==
- WSA World Tour 2014
- Men's Macau Open 2014
- Macau Open
