= Texas Open (squash) =

Squash tournament

Details
- Event name: Texas Open
- Location: Houston, United States; Dallas, United States
- Website www.dallassquash.org/TexasOpen

Women's Winner
- Category: World Tour Bronze
- Prize money: $120,000

The Texas Open is an annual pro squash tournament that takes place alternately in Dallas and Houston, United States in the first half of the year. It is an official PSA World Tour event.

== History of the Texas Open ==
The Texas Open women's professional squash tournament originated from a collaboration between the Houston Squash and Dallas Squash organizations.

The squash association in Houston has a distinguished amateur tournament history, including several Texas Opens during the 1990s. In 1996 the organizers added a men's Open draw with prize money. It was not a men's professional tour event, but as the prize grew, the number and quality of pro players accepting an invitation to participate increased. The 1998 version, hosted by the Met Club and the Houston YMCA, was particularly successful. As Rishad Alikhan reported “From the Courts” following the Oct. 23-25 event in Houston: “This year’s event offered $8500 in prize money in the Open draw and saw the largest number of participants in the tournament’s history with 112 players participating in 127 slots in 10 draws.” The Open final was a 3–1 upset victory for English pro Nick Taylor (at the time ranked 35 in the world) over 1997 World Champion, Australian Rodney Eyles, (ranked 4 at the time). Several players participated and a few even featured in the amateur draw honors: Jamie Bush 3.5 winner, Mike Frederick 3.5 Consolation winner, Ken Stillman 50+ Consolation winner, Susan Morrison Women's C/D winner. For a number of reasons, 4 years passed before the next staging of a comparable Texas Open in, and by then an interesting change had occurred.

In May 2000, Dallas hosted a $17,000 WISPA Tour event. The initial spark came from when one of their players saw a women's tour event in and began inquiries on how to bring WISPA to town. But that spark actually first caught fire in Dallas rather than Houston for two reasons. In 1999 WISPA President Sarah Fitz-Gerald came to Dallas for an exhibition with local teaching pro Aidan Harrison. Everyone in the large audience was impressed by her style and athleticism as she beat him. In addition, Dallas already had a top woman teaching pro in Thelma Van Eck. Having suffered on court with her, local players understood only too well how tough Thelma could be and were now curious how she might fare against the world's best. The stage was set for the WISPA Dallas Open! On the international court at the Downtown Dallas YMCA, one of only five proper 21’ courts in the whole Metroplex at the time, World #1 Cassie Jackman (playing under her married name, Campion) beat World #2 Leilani Joyce for the crown in four games. Local heroine Van Eck had failed to halt Joyce's march in the first round but had played valiantly. She had qualified for the main draw with a victory over rising star Natalie Grinham, ranked 30th in the world at the time. Many players travelled to for the festivities. Their most recent installment of the Texas Open had been two years earlier and it would be two more years until the next one, but a new seed was sown.

From Feb 25 – Mar 3, 2002 the Aon Texas Open was held in at the newly remodeled Met Club with five international courts. A record number of amateurs played and partied while enjoying professional squash competition in the form of a $36,000 WISPA Gold tour event. World #3 Carol Owens from beat World #4 Cassie Jackman to take the first WISPA Texas Open title in five games.

Due to the significant organizational and financial resources required to host a professional event, the Houston and Dallas squash associations decided to alternate hosting duties. Following the tournaments in 2000 and 2002, the two cities agreed to share the responsibility to make the tournament more sustainable. In March 2003, the WISPA Texas Open took place in Dallas. Cassie Jackman was sidelined with a back injury, and Carol Owens defeated Natalie Grainger in the final to repeat as champion. The Texas Open has continued to be jointly hosted by Houston and Dallas in alternating years. A permanent trophy cup was introduced starting with the 2005 event, which later featured in the World Squash Federation's (WSF) Squash 2016 promotional video.

== Past Results ==
=== Women's ===
Year	Champion	Runner-up	Score in final	Host city
2000	(England) Cassie Campion	(New Zealand) Leilani Joyce		Dallas
2002	(New Zealand) Carol Owens	(England) Cassie Campion		Houston
2003	(New Zealand) Carol Owens	(United States) Natalie Pohrer	9–10, 9–1, 9–4, 9-1	Dallas
2004	(Australia) Rachael Grinham	(England) Cassie Jackman	9–5, 9–5, 9-5	Houston
2005	(Netherlands) Vanessa Atkinson	(Australia) Rachael Grinham	9–10, 0–9, 9–4, 9–3, 9-2	Dallas
2006	(England) Vicky Botwright	(Egypt) Engy Kheirallah	9–5, 9–3, 9-2	Houston
2007	(United States) Natalie Grainger	(Hong Kong) Rebecca Chiu	9–0, 9–1, 9-4	Dallas
2008	(United States) Natalie Grainger	(England) Laura Lengthorn-Massaro	9–2, 9–5, 9-6	Houston
2009	(Malaysia) Nicol David	(United States) Natalie Grainger	7–11, 12–10, 11–5, 11-6	Dallas
2010	(New Zealand) Joelle King	(Australia) Rachael Grinham	11–8, 6–11, 11–8, 11-9	Houston
2011	(Australia) Rachael Grinham	(Australia) Kasey Brown	11–5, 10–12, 12–10, 11-7	Dallas
2012	(France) Camille Serme	(New Zealand) Joelle King	11–5, 9–11, 11–8, 11-9	Houston
2013	(Republic of Ireland) Madeline Perry	(Netherlands) Natalie Grinham	9–11, 11–8, 8–11, 11–5, 11-6	Dallas
2014	(Egypt) Nour El Sherbini	(India) Dipika Pallikal	11–7, 5–11, 11–7, 11-8	Houston
2015	(United States) Amanda Sobhy	(Egypt) Nour El Tayeb	11–7, 8–11, 11–8, 11-4	Dallas
2016	No competition			
2017	(Hong Kong) Annie Au	(Australia) Donna Urquhart	11–6, 7–11, 11–5, 5–11, 11-8	Dallas
2018	(United States) Amanda Sobhy	(United States) Reeham Sedky	11–8, 10–12, 11–6, 11-9	
2019	(United States) Amanda Sobhy	(England) Victoria Lust	11–4, 11–2, 11-5	Dallas
	2020–2021 cancelled due to COVID-19 pandemic in the United States			
	2022–2024 not held			
2025	(Egypt) Nouran Gohar	(Egypt) Hania El Hammamy	11–8, 5–11, 11–6, 11–9	Houston
2026	(Egypt) Nour El Sherbini	(United States) Olivia Weaver	13-15, 13-11, 12-14, 11-8, 11-8	Houston

=== Women's champions by country ===
Champions		Runner-up	
United States	5	England	4
Egypt	3	Australia	4
New Zealand	3	United States	4
Australia	2	Egypt	3
England	2	New Zealand	2
Ireland	1	Hong Kong	1
Malaysia	1	Netherlands	1
Hong Kong	1	India	1
France	1	United States	1
Netherlands	1	France	0

=== Men's ===
Year	Champion	Runner-up	Score in final
2018	(India) Vikram Malhotra	(Czech Republic) Daniel Mekbib	11–6, 2–11, 5–11, 15–13, 11–1
2019	(England) Nathan Lake	(United States) Christopher Gordon	11–7, 11–9, 11–9
	2020 cancelled due to COVID-19 pandemic in the United States		
2021	(Scotland) Rory Stewart	(England) Sam Todd	12–10, 10–12, 17–19, 11–5, 11–3
	2022–2024 not held		
2025	(Egypt) Ali Farag	(Egypt) Mostafa Asal	11–9, 11–4, 0–0 ret
2026	(France) Victor Crouin	(Peru) Diego Elias	9-11, 11-8, 11-5, 11-9

=== Men's champions by country ===
Champions		Runner-up	
Egypt	1	Egypt	1
England	1	England	1
India	1	Czech Republic	1
Scotland	1	United States	1
France	1	Peru	1

== Tournament Directors ==
2000, 2003, 2005 - Susan Morrison

2002, 2004, 2006 - Rishad Alikhan

2008, 2010 - Ian Munro

2012, 2014 - John Levy

2007, 2009, 2011, 2013, 2015, 2017, 2019 - Sanjeeb Samanta

== See also ==
- PSA World Tour
- WSA World Tour
