= Squash at the 2011 Arab Games =

Squash at the 2011 Pan Arab Games
- Venue: Khalifa International Complex
- Location: Doha, Qatar

At the 2011 Pan Arab Games, the squash events were held at Khalifa International Complex in Doha, Qatar from 12–15 December. A total of 2 events were contested.

== Medal summary ==
=== Men ===
Event	Gold	Silver	Bronze
Individual	Tarek Momen (EGY)	Karim Abdel Gawad (EGY)	Abdullah Almezayen (KUW)
Individual	Tarek Momen (EGY)	Karim Abdel Gawad (EGY)	Ali Alramezi (KUW)

=== Women ===
Event	Gold	Silver	Bronze
Individual	Raneem El Weleily (EGY)	Omneya Abdel Kawy (EGY)	Aisha Alhamad (KUW)
Individual	Raneem El Weleily (EGY)	Omneya Abdel Kawy (EGY)	Maryam Dashti (KUW)

== Medal table ==
Rank	Nation	Gold	Silver	Bronze	Total
1	Egypt	2	2	0	4
2	Kuwait	0	0	4	4
Totals (2 entries)		2	2	4	8
