= Low Wee Nee =

Malaysian squash player (born 1992)

Weenee Low
Personal information
- Full name: Low Wee Nee
- Born: January 9, 1992 (age 34) Penang, Malaysia
- Education: Trinity College

Sport
- Country: Malaysia
- Turned pro: 2007
- Coached by: Aaron Soyza, Wendy Bartlett, Dr. Randolph Lee, Nathan Dugan
- Retired: Active
- Racquet used: Wilson

Women's singles
- Highest ranking: No. 74 (May 2008)
- Current ranking: No. 97 (November 2018)
- Updated on November 2018

Low Wee Nee, also known as Weenee Low (born 9 January 1992 in Penang) is a Malaysian professional squash player. As of November 2018, she was ranked number 97 in the world. Weenee reached her highest world ranking of 74 in the women's professional tour in May 2008 at the age of 16. Upon graduating high school, Weenee decided to pursue her studies at Trinity College, USA where she majored in B.S Psychology and minored in Studio Arts. While thriving in her studies, Weenee accomplished a record of 41–9 in her college career, including winning the National Championship for Trinity College. Her awards and accolades include winning the CSA All American Mention (2012–2013), All- NESCAC 1ST Team (2012–2013), All- NESCAC 2nd Team (2010–2011) and James Belfiore award for overcoming adversity and inspiring teammates. She also has an elder sister, Low Wee Wern who was one of the top-ranked players in the women's tour before she retired in February 2024.
