= PSA Awards =

Annual squash awards

- Sport: Squash
- Awarded for: Excellence in Squash
- Sponsored by: Professional Squash Association

The PSA Awards are presented annually by the Professional Squash Association, the organization which organizes the world squash circuit for men and women.

== Players of the Year ==
Year	Male	Female
2004	—N/a	(Netherlands) Vanessa Atkinson
2005	(France) Thierry Lincou	(Malaysia) Nicol David
2006	(Egypt) Amr Shabana	(Malaysia) Nicol David
2007	(Egypt) Amr Shabana	(Malaysia) Nicol David
2008	(England) James Willstrop	(Malaysia) Nicol David
2009	(Egypt) Karim Darwish	(Malaysia) Nicol David
2010	(England) Nick Matthew	(Malaysia) Nicol David
2011	(Egypt) Ramy Ashour	(England) Laura Massaro
2012	(Egypt) Ramy Ashour	
2013	(England) Nick Matthew	
2014	(Egypt) Ramy Ashour	(Egypt) Raneem El Weleily
2015	(Egypt) Mohamed El Shorbagy	(Egypt) Nour El Sherbini
2016	(France) Grégory Gaultier	(France) Camille Serme
2017	(Egypt) Mohamed El Shorbagy	(Egypt) Nour El Sherbini
2018	(Egypt) Ali Farag	(Egypt) Raneem El Weleily
2019	(Egypt) Mohamed El Shorbagy	(Egypt) Nour El Sherbini
2020	—N/a	—N/a
2021	(New Zealand) Paul Coll	(Egypt) Nouran Gohar
2022		
2023	(Peru) Diego Elías	
2024	TBA	TBA
2025	(Egypt) Ali Farag	(Egypt) Nour El Sherbini

== Young Players of the Year ==
Year	Male	Female
2004	—N/a	(Egypt) Raneem El Weleily
2005	(England) James Willstrop	(Egypt) Raneem El Weleily
2006	(Egypt) Ramy Ashour	(South Africa) Tenille Swartz
2007	(Egypt) Ramy Ashour	(France) Camille Serme
2008	(Egypt) Omar Mosaad	(Hong Kong) Annie Au
2009	(Egypt) Mohamed El Shorbagy	(Egypt) Nour El Sherbini
2010	(Egypt) Mohamed El Shorbagy	(Egypt) Nour El Tayeb
2011	(Switzerland) Nicolas Müller	(Egypt) Nour El Tayeb
2012	(Egypt) Marwan El Shorbagy	
2013	(Egypt) Karim Abdel Gawad	
2014	(Egypt) Fares Dessouky	(United States) Amanda Sobhy
2015	(Egypt) Marwan El Shorbagy	(Egypt) Nouran Gohar
2016	(Peru) Diego Elías	(Egypt) Nouran Gohar
2017	(Peru) Diego Elías	(Malaysia) Sivasangari Subramaniam
2018	(Egypt) Youssef Ibrahim	(Egypt) Nouran Gohar
2019	(Egypt) Mostafa Asal	(Egypt) Hania El Hammamy
2020	—N/a	—N/a
2021	(Egypt) Mostafa Asal	(Egypt) Hania El Hammamy
2022		
2023	(Egypt) Mostafa Asal	
2024	TBA	TBA
2025	(Egypt) Mohamad Zakaria	(India) Anahat Singh (Egypt) Amina Orfi

== Challenger Players of the Year ==
Year	Male	Female
2023	(India) Abhay Singh	(Egypt) Amina Orfi
2024		
2025	(England) Sam Todd	(India) Anahat Singh

== Match of the Season ==
Year	Male	Female
2023		
2024	TBA	TBA

== Shot of the Season ==
Year	Male	Female
2023		
2024	TBA	TBA

== Spirit of Squash ==
Year	Male	Female
2023		
2024		
2025	(Egypt) Ali Farag	(Japan) Satomi Watanabe (Egypt) Nour El Sherbini

== Other awards ==
Most Improved Player of the Year
Year	Player
2004	(England) Alison Waters
2005	(England) Alison Waters
2006	(Guyana) Nicolette Fernandes
2007	(New Zealand) Shelley Kitchen
2008	(England) Laura Lengthorn-Massaro
2009	(France) Camille Serme
2010	(Australia) Kasey Brown
2011	(Egypt) Raneem El Weleily

'McKay' Player of the Year
Year	Player
2012	(Malaysia) Nicol David
2013	(England) Laura Massaro

'Cardwell' Comeback Player of the Year
Year	Player
2012	(England) Alison Waters
2013	(Australia) Lisa Camilleri

Breakthrough Player of the Year
Year	Player
2012	(Egypt) Nour El Sherbini
2013	(England) Sarah-Jane Perry

Platinum Service Award
Year	Player
2012	(Mexico) Samantha Terán
2013	(Malaysia) Nicol David

Sportsmanship Award
Year	Player
2012	(Canada) Samantha Cornett
2013	(Guyana) Nicolette Fernandes

Tournament of the Year
Year	Player
2012	(Cayman Islands) Cayman World Open
2013	(United States) US Open

== See also ==
- Men's Squash World Rankings
- List of PSA men's number 1 ranked players
- Women's Squash World Rankings
- List of PSA women's number 1 ranked players
