= Women's Squash Association =

English sports governing body, 2011–2014

- Sport: Women's Professional squash
- Jurisdiction: International
- Abbreviation: WSA
- Founded: 2012 (1983 with WISPA)
- Location: London, United Kingdom
- President: (Australia) Kasey Brown
- Chairman: (United States) Latasha Khan
- CEO: (Netherlands) Tommy Berden
- Director: (United States) Ashley Bernhard (Netherlands) Marjolein Houtsma (England) Jenny Duncalf (England) Laura Massaro
- Secretary: (United States) Nathan Dugan
- Sponsor: Dunlop, Ashaway, ASB Squash Courts
- Closure date: December 2014 (merge with PSA)

Official website
- www.wsaworldtour.com

The Women's Squash Association (WSA) was the governing body for the women's professional squash circuit between 2011 and 2014. It was based in London, England. The body operated in a similar fashion to the WTA for tennis. The WSA World Tour involved over 100 tournaments annually all over the globe. Over 250 players were registered with the WSA and rankings were updated monthly based on players' performances. In November 2014, the WSA and the PSA announced a historic merger between the two associations.[3] A decision was reached that will see the PSA operate as the governing body for both the women's and men's ranks from January 1, 2015.

== WSA World Tour ==
There were hundreds of WSA tournaments throughout the course of a season of the WSA World Tour, and they were classified into the following categories, based on prize money:

- Rising Star (Women’s Under 19 age World, Regional and National Opens which offer ranking points to Full, Regional and Rising Stars members).
- Challenger (Events with $500 – $3,999 that provide limited world ranking points and very flexible formats and arrangements)
- Super Challenger (Regional and National Closed Championships featuring prize money of $4,000+, for which Tour 5 ranking points will be offered).
- WSA Tour Tournaments :

WSA Tour 15 ($15,000 - $24,999) WSA Tour 10 ($10,000 - $14,999) WSA Tour 5 ($5,000 - $9,999)

- WSA Silver & Gold Tournaments :

WSA Gold 50 ($50,000 - $59,999) WSA Silver 35 ($35,000 - $49,999) WSA Silver 25 ($25,000 - $34,999)

- World Series (The WSA World Series was a select group of high-profile squash tournaments easily recognised. They offer the largest prize money and attract the majority of the world's best players) :

WSA World Series Platinum - $80,000 WSA World Series Gold - $60,000

- World Championship (This was the ultimate tournament on the World Tour and to become World Champion was regarded the highest pinnacle of competitive achievement amongst WSA players. With a 32-man draw).

Every year, the top eight performers from the various World Series events gathered for the WSA World Series Finals. The eight players were separated into two groups of four, and played a round robin. The top two from each group advanced to the semifinals (1st WSA1 vs. 2nd WSA2 and 1st WSA2 vs. 2nd WSA1). The winner of the event was the World Series champion.

The goals of the association were to:

- Inspire future female generations to embrace squash as a professional sport;
- Empower girls and women on and off the court; and
- Entertain the world.

The association was founded in 1983 as the Women's International Squash Players Association (WISPA).

In November 2014, the Women's Squash Association and the Professional Squash Association announced a historic merge between the two associations. A decision was reached to designate the Professional Squash Association operate as the governing body for both the women's and men's ranks from January 1, 2015.

== See also ==
- Professional Squash Association
- Official Women's Squash World Ranking
- World Squash Federation
- PSA Awards
