= Nour El Tayeb =

Egyptian squash player

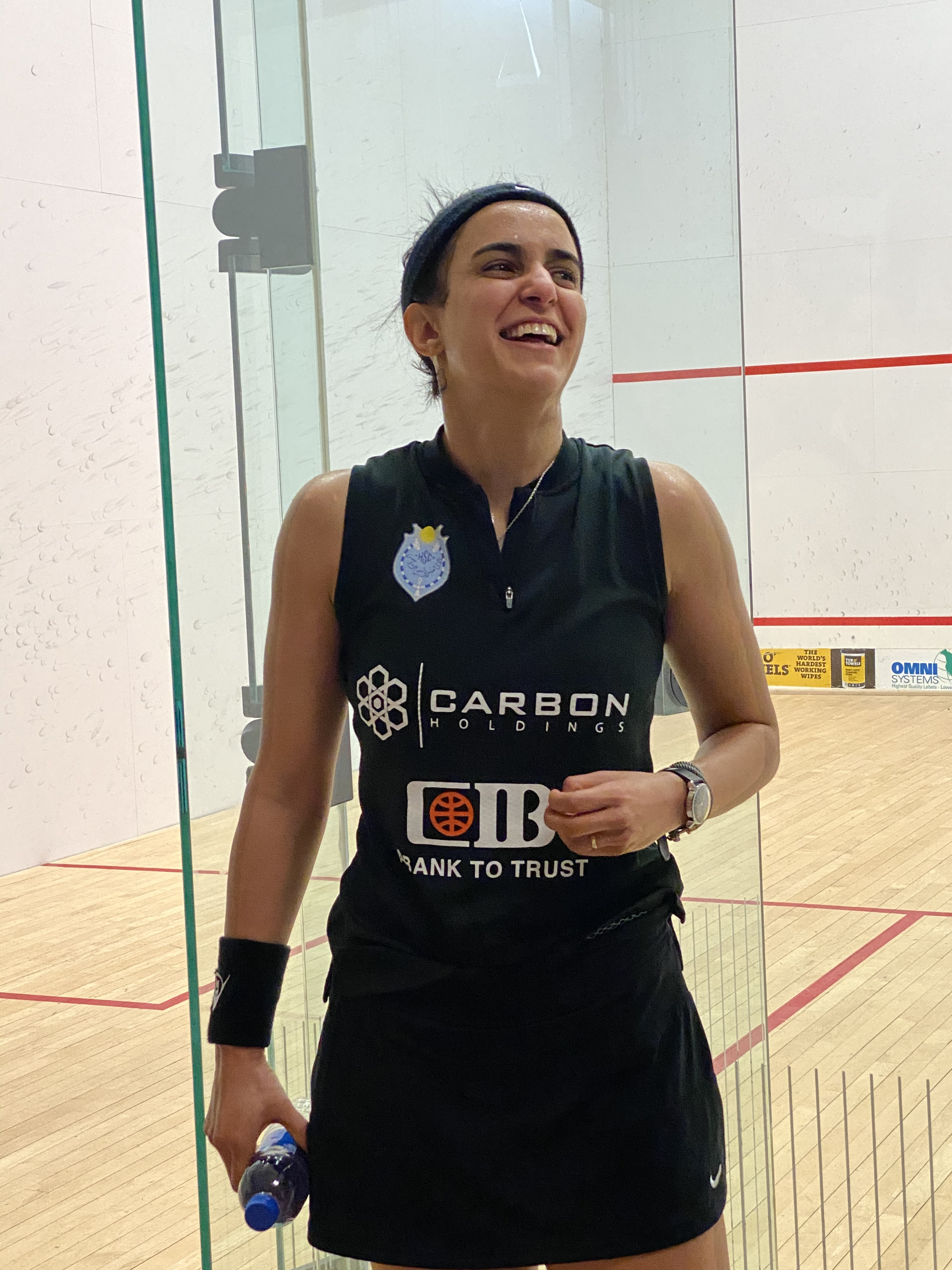
- Tayeb at the 2020 Cleveland Classic

Personal information
- Born: March 8, 1993 (age 33) Cairo, Egypt
- Height: 5 ft 6 in (168 cm)
- Spouse: Ali Farag (m. 2016)

Sport
- Country: Egypt
- Handedness: Right Handed
- Turned pro: 2007
- Coached by: Haitham Effat; Hossam Shaddad
- Retired: 2024
- Racquet used: Dunlop Hyperfibre+ Revelation 125

Women's singles
- Highest ranking: No. 3 (March, 2018)
- Title: 3
- Tour final: 4
Medal record
Women's squash
Representing Egypt
World Championships
Silver medal – second place	2018–19 Chicago	Singles
Bronze medal – third place	2017 Manchester	Singles
World Team Championships
Gold medal – first place	2012 Nîmes	Team
Gold medal – first place	2018 Dalian	Team
Gold medal – first place	2022 Cairo	Team
Bronze medal – third place	2014 Niagara-on-the-Lake	Team
- Updated on December, 2020

Nour El Tayeb (Arabic: نُور الطَّيِّب; born 8 March 1993) is a former professional squash player who represented Egypt. She reached a career-high ranking of World No. 3, in March 2018.

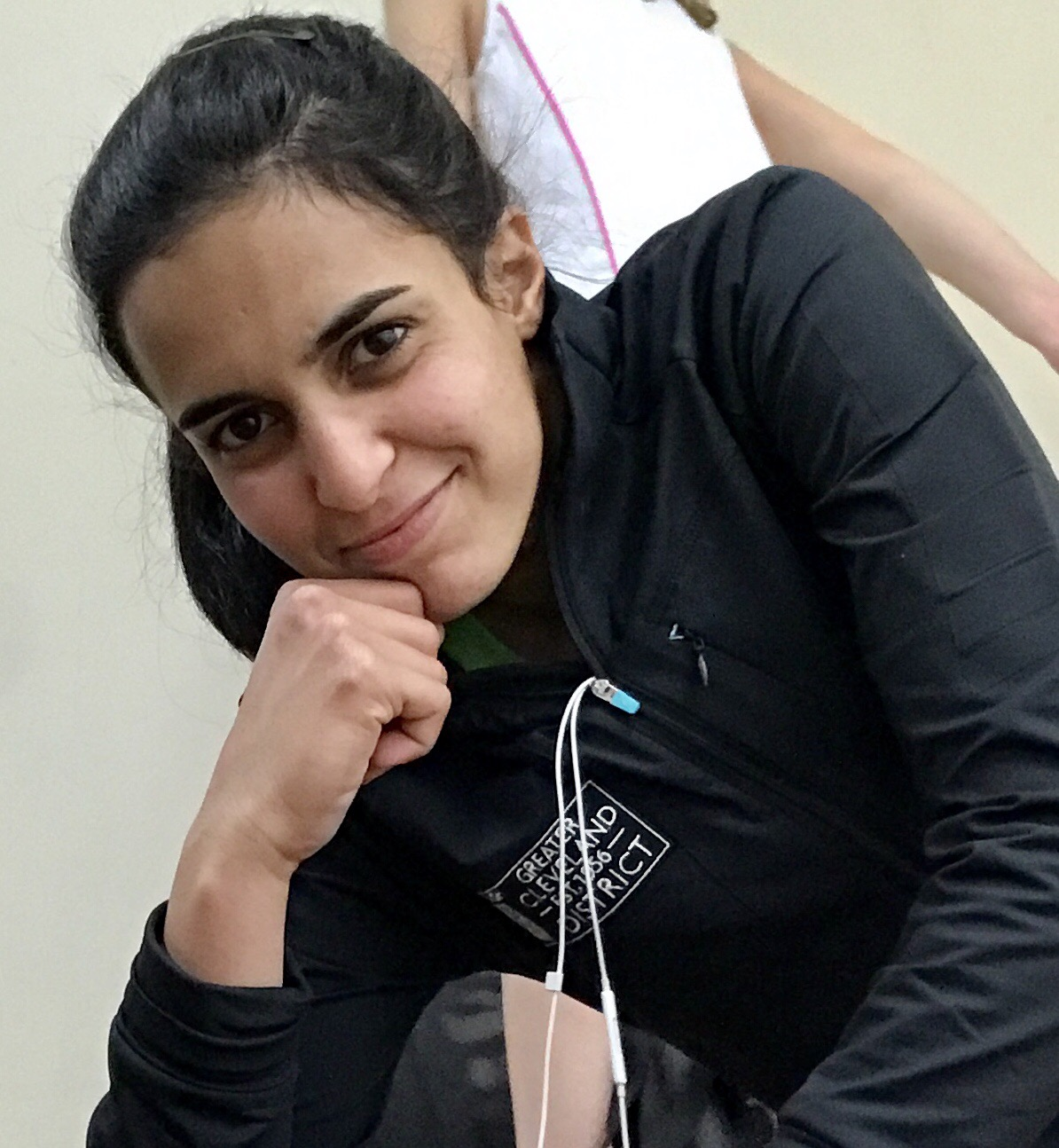
Nour El Tayeb - February 2017, Cleveland, Ohio USA

== Career ==
The highlight of her junior career was reaching the final of the World Juniors in 2009 at age sixteen, beating top seed Dipika Pallikal of India on the way, before losing to compatriot Nour El Sherbini.

In 2012, she was part of the team that regained the world team title after winning a gold medal at the 2012 Women's World Team Squash Championships.

In 2014, she was part of the Egyptian team that won the bronze medal at the 2014 Women's World Team Squash Championships.

In 2018, she was part of the Egyptian team that won the 2018 Women's World Team Squash Championships. In 2022, she was part of the Egyptian team that won the 2022 Women's World Team Squash Championships. It was her third world team title.

In May 2023, she reached the quarter final of the 2023 PSA Women's World Squash Championship, before losing to number 1 seed Nouran Gohar.

Soon after reaching the quarter-final round at the 2024 PSA Women's World Squash Championship, she announced her retirement from the PSA tour in July 2024.

== Squash achievements ==
- Winner – WISPA Young Player of the Year 2010
- Winner – Internationaux De Creteil, Paris, France
- Winner – British Junior Open U13, U15, U17, and U19
- Winner – Pioneer U11 and U13
- Winner – First National Championships U11 and U15
- Winner - World Junior Champion 2011

== Major World Series final appearances ==
=== Hong Kong Open: 1 final (0 title, 1 runner-up) ===
Outcome	Year	Opponent in the final	Score in the final
Runner-up	2014	(Malaysia) Nicol David	11–4, 12–10, 11–8

=== U.S. Open: 2 final (1 title, 1 runner-up) ===
Outcome	Year	Opponent in the final	Score in the final
Runner-up	2015	(England) Laura Massaro	11–6, 9–11, 6–11, 11–8, 11–7

=== Malaysian Open: 1 final (0 title, 1 runner-up) ===
Outcome	Year	Opponent in the final	Score in the final
Runner-up	2014	(Egypt) Raneem El Weleily	7–11, 11–3, 12–10, 2–11, 11–7

== Personal life ==
She is married to fellow squash professional Ali Farag. The pair set a new record, becoming the first married couple to both win a major title on the same day after winning the US Open in 2017. The couple came close to repeating the feat in the 2019 US Open, but Tayeb lost her final in a narrow 5-game thriller. She stepped away from the professional squash tour during the 2020–21 season to give birth, but returned the next season and reentered the top 10.

Awards and achievements
Preceded by Nour El Sherbini	WISPA Young Player of the Year; 2010-2011	Succeeded by Nour El Sherbini
