= Line Hansen =

Danish squash player (born 1983)

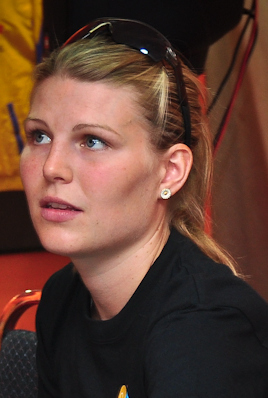
- Line Hansen during the Squash Stars Meet the Stars session 2010.

Personal information
- Born: 7 May 1983 (age 43) Odense, Denmark

Sport
- Country: Denmark
- Handedness: Right Handed
- Turned pro: 2001
- Coached by: Francesco Busi
- Retired: Active
- Racquet used: Wilson

Women's singles
- Highest ranking: No. 18 (October 2013)
- Current ranking: No. 23 (November 2016)
- Title: 11
- Tour final: 18
- World Open: 1R (2008)
- Updated on November 2016

Line U. Hansen, (born 7 May 1983 in Odense) is a professional squash player who represents Denmark. She reached a career-high world ranking of World No. 18 in October 2013.
