= Emma Beddoes =

English squash player

Personal information
- Nationality: British (English)
- Born: 29 August 1985 (age 40) Leamington Spa, England

Sport
- Handedness: Right Handed
- Turned pro: 2003
- Coached by: Richard O'Connor
- Retired: 2016
- Racquet used: Prince

Women's singles
- Highest ranking: No.11 (September 2015)
- Title: 7
- Tour final: 12
Medal record
Women's squash
Representing England
World Team Championships
Gold medal – first place	2014 Niagara-on-the-Lake	Team
Commonwealth Games
Bronze medal – third place	2014 Glasgow	Women's doubles
European Team Championships
Gold medal – first place	2011 Espoo	Team
Gold medal – first place	2014 Riccione	Team
Gold medal – first place	2015 Herning	Team

Emma Beddoes (born 29 August 1985) is an English former professional squash player. She reached a career-high world ranking of World No. 11 in September 2015.

== Biography ==
Beddoes made her first Tour appearance in 2004 and went on to reach the world's top 50 in less than two years. She won her first Tour title at the 2007 Colombo Open where she defeated number one seed Tricia Chuah in straight games.

In 2014, she was part of the team that helped England reclaim the world team title by winning the gold medal at the 2014 Women's World Team Squash Championships. Also in 2014, she won the bronze medal at the 2014 Commonwealth Games in Glasgow, Scotland, competing for the 2014 England team in the women's doubles with Alison Waters after they reached the semi-final stage before securing the medal by beating the Australian pair of Rachael Grinham and Kasey Brown.

She won her 10th Tour title at the Emerson RC Pro Series tournament in 2015, where she dropped just one game throughout the event. She retired in April 2016 after earning 25 caps for England and ten tour title wins.

Beddoes won three gold medals for the England women's national squash team at the European Squash Team Championships in 2011, 2014 and 2015.
