= Laura Massaro =

English squash player (born 1983)

Laura Massaro (née Lengthorn) MBE
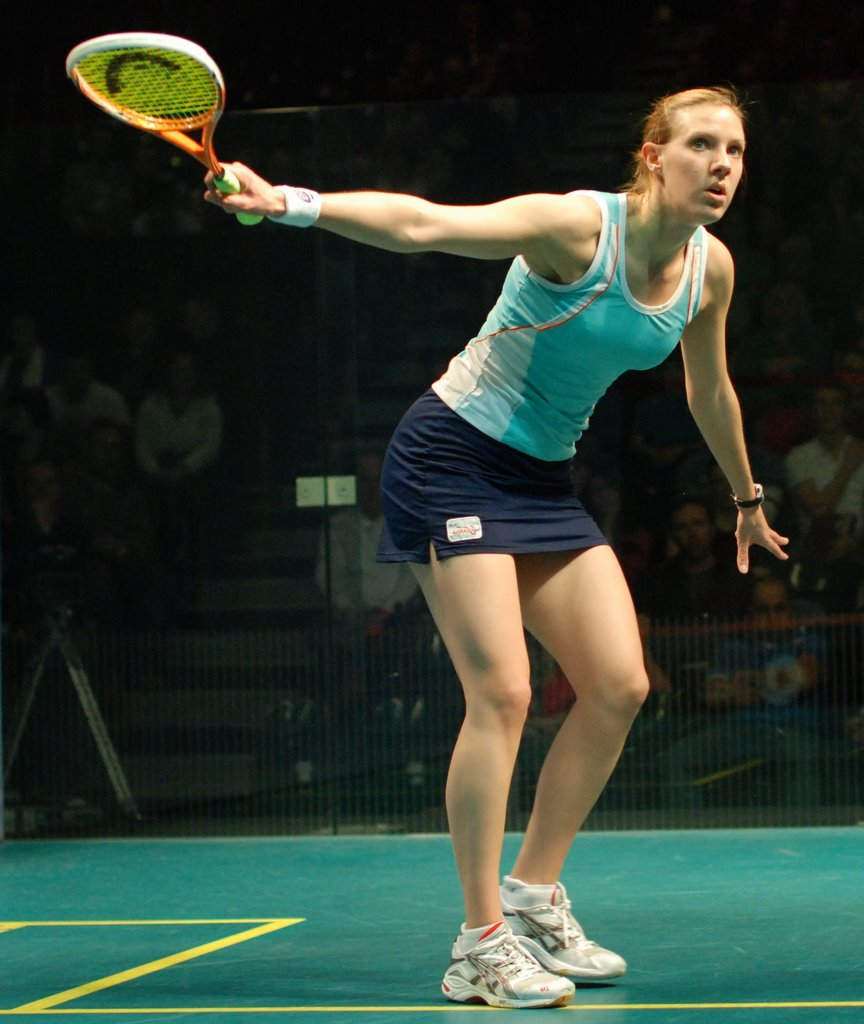

Personal information
- Born: 2 November 1983 (age 43) Great Yarmouth, England
- Height: 5 ft 8 in (1.73 m)
- Weight: 66 kg (146 lb)

Sport
- Country: England
- Handedness: Right Handed
- Turned pro: 2000
- Coached by: David Pearson, Daniel Massaro
- Retired: 2019
- Racquet used: Head

Women's singles and doubles
- Highest ranking: No. 1 (January, 2016)
- Title: 21
- Tour final: 41
- World Open: W (2013)
Medal record
Women's squash
Representing England
World Championships
Gold medal – first place	2013 Penang	Singles
Silver medal – second place	2012 Grand Cayman	Singles
Silver medal – second place	2015 Kuala Lumpur	Singles
World Team Championships
Gold medal – first place	2014 Niagara-on-the-Lake	Team
Silver medal – second place	2008 Cairo	Team
Silver medal – second place	2010 Palmerston North	Team
Silver medal – second place	2012 Nîmes	Team
Silver medal – second place	2016 Issy-les-Moulineaux	Team
Silver medal – second place	2018 Dalian	Team
Commonwealth Games
Silver medal – second place	2010 Delhi	Doubles
Silver medal – second place	2014 Glasgow	Singles
Silver medal – second place	2014 Glasgow	Doubles
European Team Championships
Gold medal – first place	2007 Riccione	Team
Gold medal – first place	2008 Amsterdam	Team
Gold medal – first place	2009 Malmö	Team
Gold medal – first place	2012 Nuremberg	Team
Gold medal – first place	2013 Amsterdam	Team
Gold medal – first place	2014 Riccione	Team
Gold medal – first place	2016 Warsaw	Team
Gold medal – first place	2018 Wrocław	Team
Silver medal – second place	2019 Birmingham	Team

Laura Jane Massaro MBE (née Lengthorn; born 2 November 1983) is an English retired professional squash player. She was ranked number 1 in the world.

== Biography ==
She was born in Great Yarmouth and attended Albany High School, Chorley, which is now called Albany Academy. In July 2007, she married Danny Massaro and became Laura Lengthorn-Massaro. She subsequently dropped 'Lengthorn' from her name and is now known professionally as Laura Massaro.

She won her first top-level title at the German Open in 2004 and went on to become British Open champion in 2013 and the World Champion also in 2013, so becoming the first Englishwoman to hold both titles at once. She is also a three-time silver medallist for England in Commonwealth Games.

Massaro was shortlisted for the Sunday Times Sky Sports Sportswomen of the Year awards. She won the WISPA Player of the Year award in 2011. She won the US Open and the Cleveland Classic in 2011, the Sharm El Sheikh Open in 2010, and the Monte Carlo Classic in 2008. In 2010, she was part of the English team that won the silver medal at the 2010 Women's World Team Squash Championships.

Massaro also won the British National Squash Championships in 2011, defeating Jenny Duncalf in the final 7–11, 11–9, 7–11, 11–7, 11–2. She had previously finished runner-up at the championships in 2008 (losing in the final to Alison Waters 11–6, 7–11, 8–11, 9–11).

At the 2010 Commonwealth Games, Massaro won a silver medal in the women's doubles (partnering Jenny Duncalf). She followed up four years later at the 2014 Commonwealth Games with two silver medals: silver in singles after finishing runner-up to Nicol David and another silver in doubles with Duncalf.

In 2012, she was part of the England team that won the silver medal at the 2012 Women's World Team Squash Championships. Massaro won the British Open in 2013. She was the first English woman to do so in 22 years.

After starting 2014 brightly by winning the WSA World Tour title in Chicago, Massaro won the biggest title of her career to date at the 2013 World Open in Penang upon beating Nour El Sherbini in the final. Her achievement, alongside that of reigning men's world champion Nick Matthew, meant that England had two reigning world squash champions for the first time.

Massaro's exceptional 2014 season continued when she was runner-up to David at the British Open in Hull in May. At the 2014 Commonwealth Games in Glasgow in July, Massaro went unbeaten through the women's singles – including a semi-final against compatriot Alison Waters – before falling to David in the gold medal match. She and Duncalf then joined forces in the doubles and won through to the final, where they lost to Indians Dipika Pallikal and Joshna Chinappa in straight games.

October saw Massaro reach the quarter-finals of the US Open, where she lost to Nour El-Sherbini. In December, she was part of the team that helped England reclaim the world team title by winning the gold medal at the 2014 Women's World Team Squash Championships; she had previously won silver on three occasions.

In 2015, she progressed to her third British Open final in succession before losing out to eventual victor Camille Serme in the 2015 Women's British Open Squash Championship.

Massaro started her 2015/16 season in strong fashion as she achieved victory at the US Open and Qatar Classic. Upon beating world No. 1 Raneem El Weleily (who herself ended David's 9-year unbroken streak as world No. 1 several months prior) in the semi-finals of the Hong Kong Open, she became the third Englishwoman (and first since 2004) to ascend to the top of the world rankings.

In 2016, she was part of the English team that won the silver medal at the 2016 Women's World Team Squash Championships. In 2018, she was part of the English team that won the silver medal at the 2018 Women's World Team Squash Championships.

Massaro won eight gold medals for the England women's national squash team at the European Squash Team Championships from her first in 2007 (under the name Lengthorn) to her last in 2019.

Massaro retired at the end of the 2018/19 season and was appointed Member of the Order of the British Empire (MBE) in the 2020 New Year Honours for services to squash.

== Sponsors ==
Laura's sponsors included 305SQUASH for clothing, Head for rackets, Asics for shoes, Technifibre for strings, UK Fast, Proto-Col, CourtCare and Corkhills Volkswagen in Wigan. Laura also partnered with HFE (Health and Fitness Education) in relation to yoga.

== Major results ==
=== World Open ===
Outcome	Year	Location	Opponent in the final	Score in the final
Runner-up	2012	Grand Cayman, Cayman Islands	(Malaysia) Nicol David	11–6, 11–8, 11–6
Winner	2013	Penang, Malaysia	(Egypt) Nour El Sherbini	11–7, 6–11, 11–9, 5–11, 11–9
Runner-up	2015	Kuala Lumpur, Malaysia	(Egypt) Nour El Sherbini	6–11, 4–11, 11–3, 11–5, 11–8

=== Major WSA World Series finals ===
British Open

Outcome	Year	Opponent in the final	Score in the final
Winner	2013	(Malaysia) Nicol David	11–4, 3–11, 12–10, 11–8
Runner-up	2014	(Malaysia) Nicol David	8–11, 11–5, 11–7, 11–8
Runner-up	2015	(France) Camille Serme	11–3, 11–5, 8–11, 11–8
Winner	2017	(England) Sarah-Jane Perry	11–8, 11–8, 6–11, 11–6

Hong Kong Open

Outcome	Year	Opponent in the final	Score in the final
Runner-up	2015	(Malaysia) Nicol David	15–13, 11–9, 11–3

Qatar Classic

Outcome	Year	Opponent in the final	Score in the final
Winner	2015	(Egypt) Nour El Sherbini	11–8, 12–14, 11–9, 8–11, 11–9

U.S. Open

Outcome	Year	Opponent in the final	Score in the final
Winner	2011	(Australia) Kasey Brown	5–11, 11–5, 11–3, 11–5
Runner-up	2013	(Malaysia) Nicol David	13–11, 11–13, 7–11, 11–8, 11–5
Winner	2015	(Egypt) Nour El Tayeb	11–6, 9–11, 6–11, 11–8, 11–7

Kuala Lumpur Open

Outcome	Year	Opponent in the final	Score in the final
Winner	2013	(England) Alison Waters	11–9, 11–7, 11–6

Tournament of Champions

Outcome	Year	Opponent in the final	Score in the final
Runner-up	2017	(France) Camille Serme	13–11, 8–11, 4–11, 11–3, 11–7

== See also ==
- Official Women's Squash World Ranking
- WISPA Awards

Sporting positions
Preceded by Raneem El Weleily	World No. 1 January 2016 – April 2016	Succeeded by Nour El Sherbini
Awards and achievements
Preceded by Shelley Kitchen	WISPA Most Improved Player of the Year; 2008	Succeeded by Camille Serme
Preceded by Nicol David; Nicol David	WSA Player of the Year; 2011; 2013	Succeeded by Nicol David; Raneem El Weleily
