= Omneya Abdel Kawy =

Egyptian squash player (born 1985)

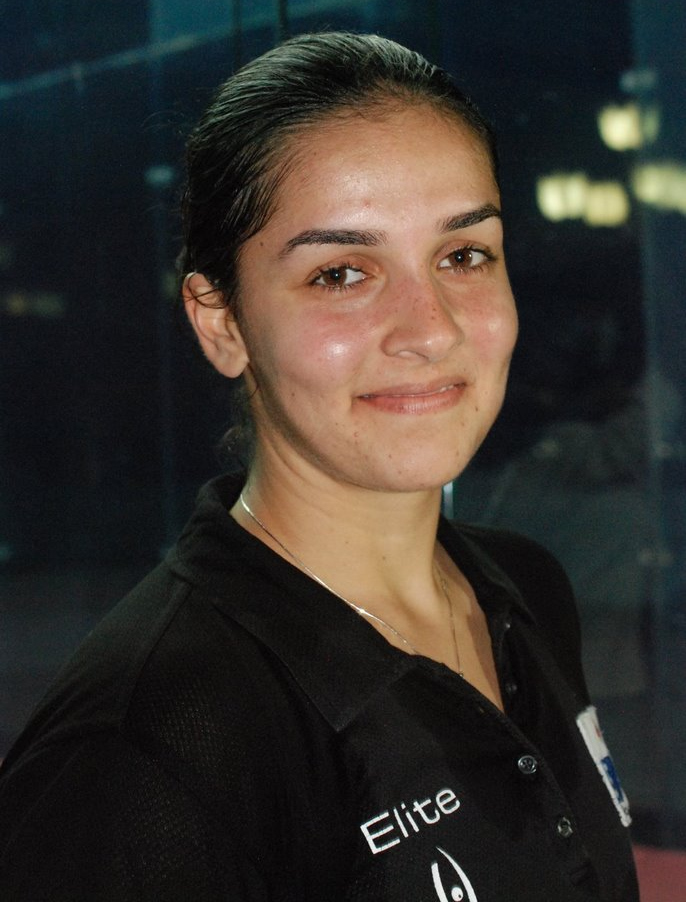
- Omneya Abdel Kawy

Personal information
- Born: August 15, 1985 (age 41) Giza, Egypt
- Height: 1.66 m (5 ft 5 in)

Sport
- Country: Egypt
- Handedness: Right Handed
- Turned pro: 1999
- Coached by: Hesham El Attar, Mohamed Abbas, Ahmed Mohsen, Mohamed Ali
- Retired: 2018
- Racquet used: Harrow

Women's singles
- Highest ranking: No. 4 (October, 2010)
- Title: 8
- Tour final: 28
- World Open: F (2010)
Medal record
Women's squash
Representing Egypt
World Championships
Silver medal – second place	2010 Sharm El Sheikh	Singles
Bronze medal – third place	2014 Cairo	Singles
World Team Championships
Gold medal – first place	2008 Cairo	Team
Gold medal – first place	2012 Nîmes	Team
Gold medal – first place	2016 Issy-les-Moulineaux	Team
Silver medal – second place	2006 Edmonton	Team
Bronze medal – third place	2014 Niagara-on-the-Lake	Team
World Games
Bronze medal – third place	2005 Duisburg	Singles
Bronze medal – third place	2009 Kaohsiung	Singles
- Updated on January, 2016

Omneya Abdel Kawy (Arabic: أمنية عبد القوي; born 15 August 1985, in Cairo) is a former professional squash player from Egypt.

== Career ==
Omneya crowned a successful junior career in 2003 in her home city of Cairo when she became the first Egyptian woman to win the World Junior Championchampionship title; she had previously been the runner-up to Nicol David in 1999 and 2001. She was already competing on the WISPA Tour during her mid-teens.

She reached number seven in the world rankings early in 2005 and achieved match ball against world number one Rachael Grinham in the final of the Hurghada International in her home country, though she eventually lost the match. She also reached another two finals, in the Harrow, Greenwich Open and the Dayton Open, both in the United States, and finished as a runner up. Omneya then won the Marsh McLennan title by beating Vicky Botwright.

2006 saw Omneya avenge the Hurghada International loss the previous year when she turned the tables in a pulsating final to win the event in front of her home supporters. In 2007, she won the Dayton Open by beating Jaclyn Hawkes of New Zealand with a score of 9–5, 9–5, 3–9 and 9–5.

She became the first Egyptian woman to break into the world top 4 and was the first Egyptian woman to reach a world individual final at the 2010 Women's World Open Squash Championship. In 2012, she was part of the team that regained the world team title after winning a gold medal at the 2012 Women's World Team Squash Championships.

In 2014, she was part of the Egyptian team that won the bronze medal at the 2014 Women's World Team Squash Championships.

In 2016, she won her third world team title as part of the Egyptian team that won the gold medal at the 2016 Women's World Team Squash Championships.

In 2018, she announced her retirement from squash.

== World Open ==
=== Finals: 1 (0 title, 1 runner-up) ===
Outcome	Year	Location	Opponent in the final	Score in the final
Runner-up	2010	Sharm el-Sheikh, Egypt	(Malaysia) Nicol David	11–5, 11–8, 11–6

== Major World Series final appearances ==
=== Hong Kong Open: 1 final (0 title, 1 runner-up) ===
Outcome	Year	Opponent in the final	Score in the final
Runner-up	2009	(Malaysia) Nicol David	11–4, 11–7, 11–7
