= Sarah-Jane Perry =

English squash player

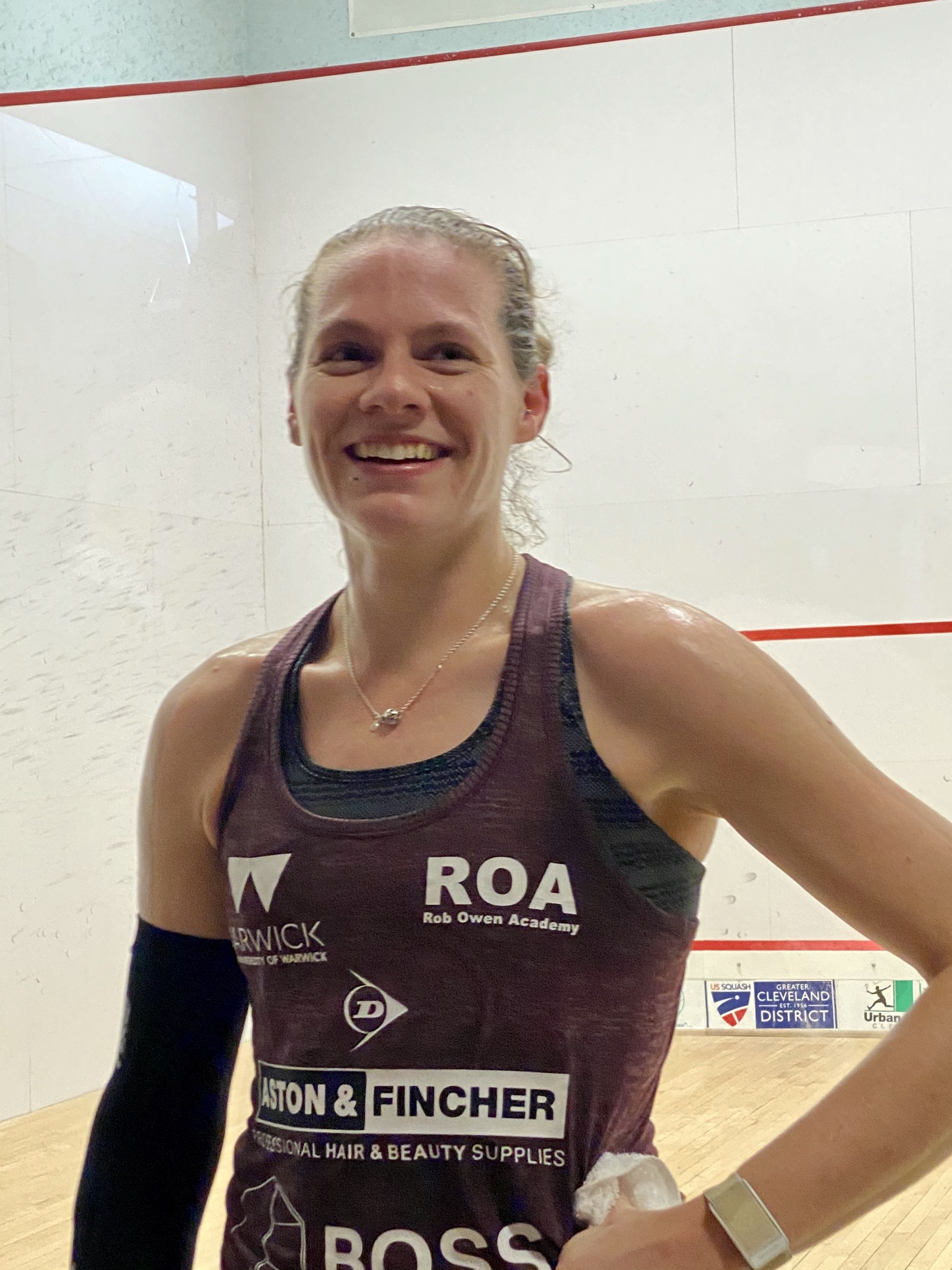
- Perry at Cleveland Classic 2020, Cleveland, Ohio USA

Personal information
- Born: 15 May 1990 (age 36) Birmingham, England
- Height: 6 ft 0 in (1.83m)

Sport
- Country: England
- Handedness: Right Handed
- Turned pro: 2011
- Coached by: Rob Owen
- Retired: 2025
- Racquet used: Dunlop

Women's singles
- Highest ranking: No. 5 (July 2020)
- Current ranking: No. 19 (December 2024)
- Title: 11
- Tour final: 15
Medal record
Women's squash
Representing England
World Team Championships
| Gold medal – first place | 2014 Niagara-on-the-Lake | Team |
| Silver medal – second place | 2016 Issy-les-Moulineaux | Team |
| Silver medal – second place | 2018 Dalian | Team |
| Bronze medal – third place | 2022 Cairo | Team |
World Doubles Championships
| Silver medal – second place | 2022 Glasgow | Doubles |
Commonwealth Games
| Silver medal – second place | 2018 Gold Coast | Singles |
| Bronze medal – third place | 2022 Birmingham | Singles |
| Silver medal – second place | 2022 Birmingham | Women's doubles |
European Team Championships
| Gold medal – first place | 2013 Amsterdam | Team |
| Gold medal – first place | 2014 Riccione | Team |
| Gold medal – first place | 2015 Herning | Team |
| Gold medal – first place | 2016 Warsaw | Team |
| Gold medal – first place | 2017 Helsinki | Team |
| Gold medal – first place | 2018 Wrocław | Team |
| Silver medal – second place | 2019 Birmingham | Team |
| Gold medal – first place | 2022 Eindhoven | Team |
| Silver medal – second place | 2024 Uster | Team |
| Gold medal – first place | 2025 Wrocław | Team |

Sarah-Jane Catherine Perry OBE (born 15 May 1990) is a professional squash player who represents England and Great Britain. She reached a career-high world ranking of World No. 5 in July 2020.

== Biography ==
Perry was educated at Kenilworth School, Kenilworth, and then graduated from Warwick University, England with a BEng (Hons) degree in 2011.

Perry had a successful junior career, culminating in winning the European Under 19 Individual Championships in Cologne and the British Under 19 Championships, both in 2009. She won two further British National Championships, at the Under 23 level in 2012 and 2013. Perry was part of the victorious England team at the 2013 European Squash Championships, her first selection at senior level. She represented Great Britain at the 2013 World Games in Cali, Colombia where she reached the quarter-finals, losing to the eventual winner Nicol David.

Perry broke into the top 20 just prior to her 23rd Birthday and reached her highest ranking of 14 after her first World Series quarter-final berth at the Malaysian Open in September 2013. However, she was forced to miss the remainder of tournaments in 2013 with a back injury.

In 2014, she was part of the team that helped England reclaim the world team title by winning the gold medal at the 2014 Women's World Team Squash Championships. Two years later in 2016, she was part of the English team that won the silver medal at the 2016 Women's World Team Squash Championships.

Perry made her Team England debut at the Gold Coast 2018 Commonwealth Games where she won a silver medal in the women's singles, losing in the final to Joelle King. Also in 2018, she was part of the English team that won the silver medal at the 2018 Women's World Team Squash Championships.

In 2020, Perry won her most prestigious title by winning the CIB Black Ball Squash Open. In 2021, she won her third women's singles title at the British National Squash Championships, having previously won in 2015 and 2020.

In August 2022, Perry won two medals at the 2022 Commonwealth Games in Birmingham. On 3 August 2022, Perry won bronze in the women's singles, beaten by England team-mate (and eventual gold medallist) Georgina Kennedy at the semi-final stage before recovering from 0-2 down to win 3-2 against New Zealand's Joelle King to take the third place medal. On 8 August 2022, Perry won silver in the women's doubles, playing with Alison Waters. The duo lost 11-8 11-8 to New Zealand's Joelle King and Amanda Landers-Murphy.

In 2022, she won a bronze at the 2022 Women's World Team Squash Championships. In 2024, Perry was part of the England squad that reached the quarter-final of the 2024 World Team Championships before being eliminated by Malaysia.

In May 2025, Perry was part of the England team that won the gold medal at the 2025 European Squash Team Championships in Wrocław, Poland. It was her eighth European team gold.

Awards and achievements
| Preceded by Nour El Sherbini | WSA Breakthrough Player of the Year; 2013 | Succeeded by Amanda Sobhy |
