= Low Wee Wern =

Malaysian squash player (born 1990)

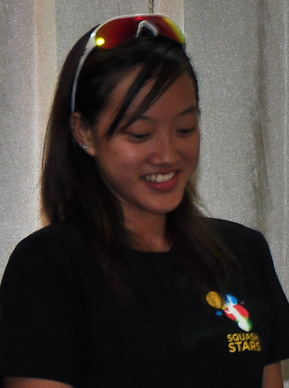
- Low Wee Wern during the Squash Stars Meet the Stars session in 2010.

Personal information
- Full name: Low Wee Wern
- Nickname: Werny
- Born: 25 July 1990 (age 36) Penang, Malaysia

Sport
- Country: Malaysia
- Handedness: Right Handed
- Turned pro: 2006
- Coached by: Aaron Soyza
- Retired: 2024
- Racquet used: Custom Harrow Silk

Women's singles
- Highest ranking: No. 5 (October 2014)
- Title: 12
- Tour final: 25
- World Open: QF (2010)
Medal record
Women's squash
Representing Malaysia
World Team Championships
Silver medal – second place	2014 Niagara-on-the Lake	Team
Bronze medal – third place	2010 Palmerston North	Team
Bronze medal – third place	2012 Nîmes	Team
Asian Games
Gold medal – first place	2010 Guangzhou	Team
Gold medal – first place	2014 Incheon	Team
Silver medal – second place	2014 Incheon	Singles
Bronze medal – third place	2010 Guangzhou	Singles
Bronze medal – third place	2018 Jakarta-Palembang	Team
- Updated on February, 2024

Low Wee Wern

Chinese name
- Traditional Chinese: 劉薇雯
- Simplified Chinese: 刘薇雯
Transcriptions
Standard Mandarin
- Hanyu Pinyin: Liú Wēiwén
Yue: Cantonese
- Jyutping: Lau4 Mei4 Man4
Southern Min
- Hokkien POJ: Lâu Bî-bûn
- Tâi-lô: Lâu Bî-bûn

Low Wee Wern (simplified Chinese: 刘薇雯; traditional Chinese: 劉薇雯; pinyin: Liú Wēiwén; Jyutping: Lau4 Mei4 Man4; Pe̍h-ōe-jī: Lâu Bî-bûn; born 25 July 1990 in Penang, Malaysia) is a retired Malaysian professional squash player. She reached a career-high world ranking of World No. 5 in October 2014.

== Personal life ==
Low attended Methodist Girls' School, Penang for her primary school years before moving to Sri Pelita for her secondary school years. Her sister Low Wee Nee is also a former professional squash player.

== Career ==
Low began playing squash at the age of nine based at the Penang International Squash Centre at Bukit Dumbar in George Town, Penang. Between 2001 and 2006, Low won 19 Junior titles including U19 Asian Junior and Pioneer Cup titles in 2006.

In 2010, she was part of the Malaysian team that won the bronze medal at the 2010 Women's World Team Squash Championships. Two years later, she was again part of the Malaysian team that won the bronze medal at the 2012 Women's World Team Squash Championships.

In 2014 Incheon Asian Games, Low took the women's singles silver medal after losing to her compatriot Nicol David. She also won the gold medal for women's team alongside David and her teammates. Also in 2014, she was part of the Malaysian team that won the silver medal at the 2014 Women's World Team Squash Championships; she had previously won two bronze medals. She also reached a career high of world number 5.

In 2019, she won her third Malaysian national title. After suffering several knee injuries, she returned to the tour in September 2022. She retired in February 2024.

== Coaching career ==
After her retirement, Low in March 2024 was signed in by the Philippine Squash Academy to be the head coach of the Philippine squash national squash team.
