= Alison Waters =

English squash player (born 1984)

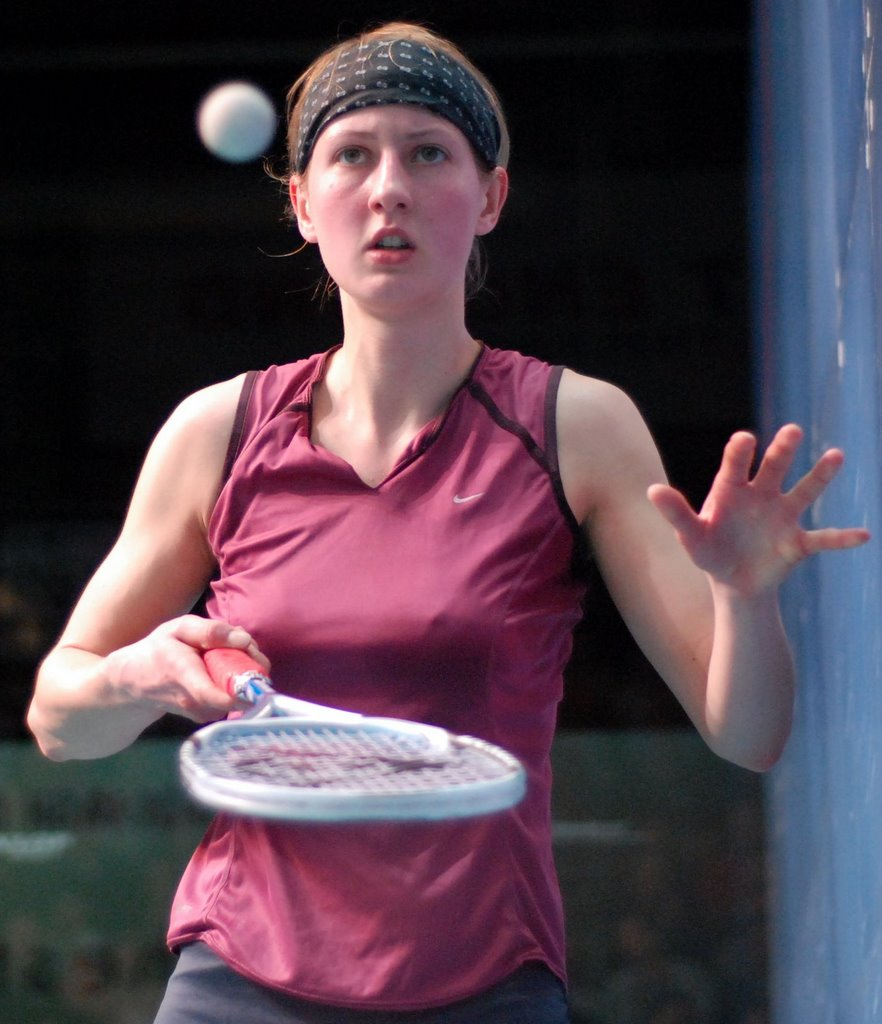
- Alison Waters

Personal information
- Nationality: British (English)
- Born: 19 March 1984 (age 42) London, England
- Height: 1.70 m (5 ft 7 in)

Sport
- Handedness: Right Handed
- Turned pro: 1999
- Coached by: Paul Carter
- Retired: 2021
- Racquet used: Salming

Women's singles
- Highest ranking: No. 3 (October 2010)
- Title: 9
- Tour final: 19
Medal record
Women's squash
Representing England
World Championships
Bronze medal – third place	2009 Amsterdam	Singles
Bronze medal – third place	2010 Sharm El Sheikh	Singles
Bronze medal – third place	2014 Cairo	Singles
World Team Championships
Gold medal – first place	2006 Edmonton	Team
Gold medal – first place	2014 Niagara-on-the-Lake	Team
Silver medal – second place	2008 Cairo	Team
Silver medal – second place	2012 Nîmes	Team
Silver medal – second place	2016 Issy-les-Moulineaux	Team
Silver medal – second place	2018 Dalian	Team
World Doubles Championships
Silver medal – second place	2017 Manchester	Doubles
Silver medal – second place	2017 Manchester	Mixed doubles
Silver medal – second place	2022 Glasgow	Doubles
Silver medal – second place	2022 Glasgow	Mixed doubles
Commonwealth Games
Silver medal – second place	2014 Glasgow	Mixed doubles
Bronze medal – third place	2014 Glasgow	Doubles
Silver medal – second place	2022 Birmingham	Mixed doubles
Silver medal – second place	2022 Birmingham	Women's doubles
European Team Championships
Gold medal – first place	2005 Amsterdam	Team
Gold medal – first place	2007 Riccione	Team
Gold medal – first place	2008 Amsterdam	Team
Gold medal – first place	2009 Malmö	Team
Gold medal – first place	2012 Nuremberg	Team
Gold medal – first place	2013 Amsterdam	Team
Gold medal – first place	2014 Riccione	Team
Gold medal – first place	2015 Herning	Team
Gold medal – first place	2016 Warsaw	Team
Gold medal – first place	2017 Helsinki	Team
Gold medal – first place	2018 Wrocław	Team

Alison Claire Waters (born 19 March 1984) is an English former professional squash player. She reached a career high ranking of 3 in the world during October 2010.

== Biography ==
As a junior player, Waters won her first major squash tournament – the British Under-12 title – at the age of nine-and-a-half. She retained the title the following year. She was a three-time runner-up at the British Open Under-14 Championships. She won her first professional title in 2005 at the Forbes Open, beating Carla Khan in the final.

Waters represented the 2006 England team at the 2006 Commonwealth Games in Melbourne, Australia, where she competed in the women's doubles and mixed doubles events Also in 2006, at the 2006 Women's World Team Squash Championships in Edmonton, Canada, she helped England win the gold medal. Four years later, she represented the 2010 England team at the 2010 Commonwealth Games in Delhi, India, where she competed in the women's singles and reached the semi final before withdrawing with an injury.

Waters won the British National Squash Championships in February 2010, beating Jenny Duncalf in the final 10–12, 11–7, 4–11, 11–7, 12–10. Waters also won the championship in 2008 beating Laura Lengthorn-Massaro and finished as the runner-up in 2005, 2007 and 2009.

In 2012, she was part of the England team that won the silver medal at the 2012 Women's World Team Squash Championships.

In 2014, she was part of the team that helped England reclaim the world team title by winning the gold medal at the 2014 Women's World Team Squash Championships.

In 2016, she was part of the English team that won the silver medal at the 2016 Women's World Team Squash Championships. In 2018, she won her fourth silver medal at the 2018 Women's World Team Squash Championships.

Waters won 11 gold medals for the England women's national squash team at the European Squash Team Championships from 2005 to 2018.

== Major World Series final appearances ==
Malaysian Open

Outcome	Year	Opponent in the final	Score in the final
Runner-up	2009	(Malaysia) Nicol David	11–6, 11–8, 9–11, 11-7

== See also ==
- Official Women's Squash World Ranking
- WISPA Awards

Awards and achievements
Preceded by —	WISPA Most Improved Player of the Year; 2004–2005	Succeeded by Nicolette Fernandes

Awards and achievements
Preceded by Raneem El Weleily	WSA 'Cardwell' Comeback Player of the Year; 2012	Succeeded by Lisa Camilleri
