= 2010 WISPA World Tour =

WISPA World Tour 2010

Details
- Event name: WISPA World Tour 2010
- Categories: WSA World Open; 2010 WISPA World Series (2); WSA Gold & Silver (20)
- Website www.wispa.net

Achievements
- World Number 1: (Malaysia) Nicol David (12 months)
- World Champion: (Malaysia) Nicol David

Awards
- Player of the year: (Malaysia) Nicol David
- Young player of the year: (Egypt) Nour El Tayeb
- Most improved player of the year: (Australia) Kasey Brown

The WISPA World Tour 2010 is the international squash tour and organized circuit, organized by the Women's International Squash Players Association (WISPA) for the 2010 squash season. The most important tournament in the series is the World Open held in Sharm el-Sheikh in Egypt. The tour features three categories of regular events, the World Series, which features the highest prize money and the best fields, Gold and Silver tournaments.

== 2010 Calendar ==
=== World Open ===
Tournament	Date	Champion	Runner-up	Semifinalists	Quarterfinalists
World Open 2010 (Egypt) Sharm el-Sheikh, Egypt; World Open - World Series Platinum $147,000 - Draw	18–22 September 2010	(Malaysia) Nicol David; 11-5, 11–8, 11–6	(Egypt) Omneya Abdel Kawy	(England) Alison Waters (France) Camille Serme	(England) Jenny Duncalf (Australia) Kasey Brown (Netherlands) Vanessa Atkinson (Malaysia) Low Wee Wern

=== World Series ===
Tournament	Date	Champion	Runner-up	Semifinalists	Quarterfinalists
Hong Kong Open 2010; Hong Kong, China; World Series Gold $74,000 - Draw	25–29 August 2010	(Malaysia) Nicol David; 11-6, 12–10, 12–10	(England) Jenny Duncalf	(Australia) Rachael Grinham (England) Alison Waters	(Egypt) Omneya Abdel Kawy (Republic of Ireland) Madeline Perry (England) Laura Massaro (Australia) Kasey Brown
Qatar Classic 2010; Doha, Qatar; World Series Gold $74,000 - Draw	8–12 November 2010	(Malaysia) Nicol David; 11-5, 11–8, 11–9	(Australia) Rachael Grinham	(England) Jenny Duncalf (Egypt) Nour El Tayeb	(England) Laura Massaro (Australia) Kasey Brown (Egypt) Raneem El Weleily (New Zealand) Joelle King

=== Gold 45 ===
Tournament	Date	Champion	Runner-up	Semifinalists	Quarterfinalists
Chennai Squash Open 2010 (India) Chennai; Gold 45 $53,500	4–9 March 2010	(Malaysia) Nicol David; 11-6, 11–4, 11–6	(England) Jenny Duncalf	(France) Camille Serme (Australia) Kasey Brown	(Australia) Rachael Grinham (England) Laura Massaro (Australia) Kasey Brown (Mexico) Samantha Terán
Kuala Lumpur Open Squash Championships 2010 (Malaysia) Kuala Lumpur, Malaysia; Gold 45 $53,500	17–20 March 2010	(Malaysia) Nicol David; 11-4 11-2 13–11	(Egypt) Omneya Abdel Kawy	(England) Jenny Duncalf (England) Alison Waters	(Republic of Ireland) Madeline Perry (England) Laura Massaro (Australia) Kasey Brown (Mexico) Samantha Terán
Cayman Islands Open 2010; Cayman Islands; Gold 45 $55,300	13–17 April 2010	(Malaysia) Nicol David; 11-8, 11–8, 11–4	(England) Jenny Duncalf	(Australia) Rachael Grinham (Republic of Ireland) Madeline Perry	(Australia) Kasey Brown (France) Camille Serme (England) Sarah Kippax (France) Isabelle Stoehr
Malaysian Open Squash Championships 2010 (Malaysia) Kuala Lumpur, Malaysia; Gold 45 $53,500	21–24 July 2010	(Malaysia) Nicol David; 11-6 6-11 11-7 10-12 11–5	(England) Jenny Duncalf	(England) Alison Waters (Egypt) Raneem El Weleily	(Egypt) Omneya Abdel Kawy (France) Camille Serme (Malaysia) Low Wee Wern (Egypt) Raneem El Weleily
Singapore Women's Masters 2010; Singapore; Gold 45 $53,500	28–31 July 2010	(Malaysia) Nicol David; 18-16, 11–9, 12–10	(England) Alison Waters	(Australia) Rachael Grinham (Republic of Ireland) Madeline Perry	(United States) Natalie Grainger (Republic of Ireland) Madeline Perry (Australia) Kasey Brown (France) Camille Serme
Australian Open 2010 (Australia) Canberra, Australia; Gold 45 $56,000	11–15 August 2010	(Republic of Ireland) Madeline Perry; 11-5, 12–10, 6–11, 4–11, 13–11	(England) Alison Waters	(England) Jenny Duncalf (Australia) Rachael Grinham	(England) Laura Massaro (Australia) Kasey Brown (New Zealand) Jaclyn Hawkes (Australia) Donna Urquhart
Torneo International Mexicano 2010; Mexico, Mexico; Gold 45 $67,500	20–24 October 2010	(Malaysia) Nicol David; 12-10, 11–4, 11–5	(Australia) Rachael Grinham	(Australia) Kasey Brown (Egypt) Raneem El Weleily	(England) Jenny Duncalf (Republic of Ireland) Madeline Perry (Mexico) Samantha Terán (New Zealand) Jaclyn Hawkes

=== Silver 30 ===
Tournament	Date	Champion	Runner-up	Semifinalists	Quarterfinalists
Greenwich Open 2010 (United States) New York City, United States; Silver 30 $37,450	21–24 January 2010	(England) Alison Waters; 11-8, 12–10, 11–8	(Egypt) Omneya Abdel Kawy	(Netherlands) Vanessa Atkinson (Egypt) Raneem El Weleily	(England) Laura Massaro (Egypt) Engy Kheirallah (Mexico) Samantha Terán (England) Tania Bailey
Burning River Classic 2010 (United States) Cleveland, United States; Silver 30 $39,050	31 January - 3 February 2010	(England) Alison Waters; 11-7, 11–9, 7–11, 3–11, 11–6	(Egypt) Omneya Abdel Kawy	(Mexico) Samantha Terán (Egypt) Raneem El Weleily	(Republic of Ireland) Madeline Perry (Australia) Kasey Brown (France) Isabelle Stoehr (New Zealand) Joelle King
US Open 2010 (United States) Chicago, United States; Silver 30 $36,500	28 September - 2 October 2010	(Netherlands) Vanessa Atkinson; 11-6, 11–4, 11–8	(United States) Amanda Sobhy	(Denmark) Line Hansen (Italy) Manuela Manetta	(France) Isabelle Stoehr (Republic of Ireland) Aisling Blake (United States) Latasha Khan (England) Emma Beddoes
Carol Weymuller Open 2010 (United States) Brooklyn, United States; Silver 30 $42,450	28–31 October 2010	(England) Jenny Duncalf; 11-6, 11–1, 11–6	(England) Laura Massaro	(Australia) Rachael Grinham (Australia) Kasey Brown	(Egypt) Raneem El Weleily (Mexico) Samantha Terán (Hong Kong) Rebecca Chiu (Egypt) Nour El Tayeb
Punj Lloyd Squash Masters 2010 (India) New Delhi, India; Silver 30 $36,500	16–19 December 2010	(England) Jenny Duncalf; 11-5, 11–5, 11–4	(Australia) Kasey Brown	(France) Camille Serme (Hong Kong) Annie Au	(New Zealand) Jaclyn Hawkes (Malaysia) Low Wee Wern (Hong Kong) Joey Chan (India) Dipika Pallikal

=== Silver 20 ===
Tournament	Date	Champion	Runner-up	Semifinalists	Quarterfinalists
Texas Open 2010 (United States) Dallas, United States; Silver 20 $26,700	8–11 April 2010	(New Zealand) Joelle King; 11-8, 6–11, 11–8, 11–9	(Australia) Rachael Grinham	(England) Dominique Lloyd-Walter (Malaysia) Low Wee Wern	(New Zealand) Jaclyn Hawkes (Australia) Donna Urquhart (Hong Kong) Joey Chan (Malaysia) Delia Arnold
Hurghada International 2010 (Egypt) Le Caire, Egypt; Silver 20 $26,200	4–9 May 2010	(Egypt) Omneya Abdel Kawy; 11-4, 11–8, 14–12	(Egypt) Engy Kheirallah	(France) Camille Serme (Egypt) Raneem El Weleily	(France) Isabelle Stoehr (Denmark) Line Hansen (Egypt) Nour El Sherbini (Egypt) Heba El Torky
Irish Squash Open 2010 (Republic of Ireland) Dublin, Ireland; Silver 20 $25,300	1–4 September 2010	(Republic of Ireland) Madeline Perry; 13-11, 11–8, 11–6	(Netherlands) Vanessa Atkinson	(England) Laura Massaro (Republic of Ireland) Aisling Blake	(United States) Natalie Grainger (Netherlands) Natalie Grinham (England) Sarah Kippax (England) Victoria Lust
Heliopolis Open 2010 (Egypt) Le Caire, Egypt; Silver 20 $25,300	11–14 September 2010	(Egypt) Nour El Sherbini; 11-6, 11–9, rtd	(Australia) Rachael Grinham	(Egypt) Nour El Tayeb (Egypt) Heba El Torky	(Denmark) Line Hansen (India) Joshna Chinappa (Czech Republic) Lucie Fialová (Egypt) Nouran El Torky
Monte Carlo Classic 2010 (Monaco) Monte Carlo, Monaco; Silver 20 $25,300	26–29 October 2010	(Egypt) Omneya Abdel Kawy; 11-5, 11–7, 4–11, 11–9	(Netherlands) Vanessa Atkinson	(France) Camille Serme (Netherlands) Annelize Naudé	(France) Isabelle Stoehr (Republic of Ireland) Aisling Blake (Netherlands) Orla Noom (Guyana) Nicolette Fernandes
Dutch Open Squash 2010 (Netherlands) Rotterdam, Netherlands; Silver 20 $30,000	8–11 November 2010	(Netherlands) Vanessa Atkinson; 11-9, 11–3, 11–7	(Republic of Ireland) Madeline Perry	(Australia) Rachael Grinham (Netherlands) Natalie Grinham	(England) Sarah Kippax (Republic of Ireland) Aisling Blake (Italy) Manuela Manetta (Netherlands) Orla Noom
Seoul Squash Open 2010 (South Korea) Seoul, South Korea; Silver 20 $20,000	18–21 December 2010	(Hong Kong) Annie Au; 11-7, 11–7, 11–5	(Malaysia) Low Wee Wern	(Australia) Donna Urquhart (Malaysia) Delia Arnold	(England) Sarah Kippax (Hong Kong) Joey Chan (South Korea) Song Sun-mi (Japan) Chinatsu Matsui
Sharm El Sheikh International 2010 (Egypt) Sharm-el-sheikh, Egypt; Silver 20 $29,500	14–17 December 2010	(England) Laura Massaro; 11-5, 9–11, 12–10, 12–10	(Egypt) Raneem El Weleily	(Egypt) Nour El Tayeb (Egypt) Heba El Torky	(Egypt) Kanzy El Dafrawy (England) Victoria Lust (Czech Republic) Lucie Fialová (Egypt) Salma Hany

== Year end world top 10 players ==
Rank	2010	
1	(Malaysia) Nicol David	3340.000
2	(England) Jenny Duncalf	1621.765
3	(England) Alison Waters	1480.625
4	(Egypt) Omneya Abdel Kawy	1292.353
5	(Australia) Rachael Grinham	1166.000
6	(Republic of Ireland) Madeline Perry	1005.800
7	(Australia) Kasey Brown	882.381
8	(Netherlands) Vanessa Atkinson	790.059
9	(England) Laura Massaro	770.211
10	(France) Camille Serme	769.895

== Retirements ==
Following is a list of notable players (winners of a main tour title, and/or part of the WISPA World Rankings top 30 for at least one month) who announced their retirement from professional squash, became inactive, or were permanently banned from playing, during the 2010 season:

- (United States) Natalie Grainger (born 8 July 1977 in the Manchester, England) joined the pro tour in 1996, reached the world no. 1 ranking in June 2003. She was runner-up at the World Open in 2002, and at the British Open in 2004. She won 22 WISPA World Tour titles including the Qatar Classic, the Kuala Lumpur Open, the Carol Weymuller Open and the Hurghada International. She retired in April 2011.
- Shelley Kitchen (born 2 December 1979 in the Kaitaia, New Zealand) joined the pro tour in 2000, reached the singles no. 6 spot in September 2008. She won 12 WISPA World Tour titles including the Australian Open, the Singapore Open and the Harrow Greenwich Open. She retired in February after competing of the New Zealand Open.
- (Netherlands) Annelize Naudé (born 1 January 1977 in the Kempton Park, South Africa) joined the pro tour in 1996, reached the singles no. 13 spot in January 2006. She won 5 WISPA World Tour titles including Danish Open in 2002, Swiss Open in 2004 and reached the final of the Singapore Open in 2001. She retired in January 2010.
- Sharon Wee (born 5 October 1977 in Malacca, Malaysia) joined the pro tour in 1997, reached the singles no. 18 spot in December 2006. She won 8 WISPA World Tour titles including Japan Open in 2002 and the Berkshire Open in 2006. She retired in December 2010 after losing in quarter final of the Carol Weymuller Open in November 2010.

== See also ==
- Official Women's Squash World Ranking
- Women's International Squash Players Association
- 2010 Women's World Team Squash Championships
- WISPA World Series 2010
- PSA World Tour 2010
