= 2013 WSA World Tour =

WSA World Tour 2013

Details
- Event name: WSA World Tour 2013
- Tournaments: 62
- Categories: WSA World Open; WSA World Series (5); WSA Gold & Silver (8); WSA Tour (48)
- Website www.wsaworldtour.com

Achievements
- World Number 1: (Malaysia) Nicol David (12 months)
- World Champion: (England) Laura Massaro

Awards
- Player of the year: (England) Laura Massaro
- Comeback player of the year: (Australia) Lisa Camilleri
- Breakthrough player of the year: (England) Sarah-Jane Perry

The WSA World Tour 2013 is the international squash tour and organized circuit, organized by the Women's Squash Association (WSA) for the 2013 squash season. The most important tournament in the series is the World Open held in Penang in Malaysia in March 2014. The tour features three categories of regular events, the World Series, which features the highest prize money and the best fields, Gold and Silver tournaments.

== 2013 Calendar ==
The Women's Squash Association organises the WSA World Tour, the female equivalent of the PSA World Tour Listed below are the most important events on the tour.

=== World Open ===
Tournament	Date	Champion	Runner-up	Semifinalists	Quarterfinalists
WSA World Open 2013 (Malaysia) Penang, Malaysia; World Open $120,000 - Draw	14–21 March 2014	(England) Laura Massaro; 11–7, 6-11, 11–9, 5-11, 11–9	(Egypt) Nour El Sherbini	(Malaysia) Nicol David (Egypt) Raneem El Weleily	(New Zealand) Joelle King (Malaysia) Low Wee Wern (Republic of Ireland) Madeline Perry (France) Camille Serme

=== World Series ===
Tournament	Date	Champion	Runner-up	Semifinalists	Quarterfinalists
Kuala Lumpur Open Squash Championships 2013 (Malaysia) Kuala Lumpur, Malaysia; World Series Gold $70,000 - Draw	27–31 March 2013	(England) Laura Massaro; 11-9, 11-7, 11-6	(England) Alison Waters	(Malaysia) Nicol David (New Zealand) Joelle King	(England) Jenny Duncalf (Republic of Ireland) Madeline Perry (Egypt) Nour El Sherbini (Netherlands) Natalie Grinham
British Open 2013 (England) Hull, England; World Series Platinum $95,000 - Draw	21–26 May 2013	(England) Laura Massaro; 11-4, 3-11, 12-10, 11-8	(Malaysia) Nicol David	(Egypt) Raneem El Weleily (England) Alison Waters	(New Zealand) Joelle King (England) Jenny Duncalf (Australia) Kasey Brown (Egypt) Omneya Abdel Kawy
Malaysian Open Squash Championships 2013 (Malaysia) Kuala Lumpur, Malaysia; World Series Gold $70,000 - Draw	12–15 September 2013	(Malaysia) Nicol David; 13-11, 11-13, 7-11, 11-8, 11-5	(Egypt) Raneem El Weleily	(England) Laura Massaro (France) Camille Serme	(New Zealand) Joelle King (Malaysia) Low Wee Wern (England) Jenny Duncalf (England) Sarah-Jane Perry
US Open 2013 (United States) Philadelphia, United States; World Series Platinum $115,000 - Draw	13–18 October 2013	(Malaysia) Nicol David; 11-8, 11-7, 11-6	(England) Laura Massaro	(New Zealand) Joelle King (Malaysia) Low Wee Wern	(Egypt) Raneem El Weleily (England) Alison Waters (Republic of Ireland) Madeline Perry (Australia) Kasey Brown
Hong Kong Open 2013; Hong Kong, China; World Series Gold $70,000 - Draw	4-8 December 2013	(Malaysia) Nicol David; 11-7, 11-7, 12-10	(Egypt) Raneem El Weleily	(England) Alison Waters (Hong Kong) Annie Au	(England) Laura Massaro (England) Jenny Duncalf (Egypt) Omneya Abdel Kawy (India) Joshna Chinappa

=== Gold 50 ===
Tournament	Date	Champion	Runner-up	Semifinalists	Quarterfinalists
Cleveland Classic 2013 (United States) Cleveland, United States; Gold 50 $50,000 - Draw	2–5 February 2013	(Egypt) Raneem El Weleily; 3-11, 11-5, 9-11, 11-5, 11-9	(Malaysia) Nicol David	(England) Alison Waters (Republic of Ireland) Madeline Perry	(New Zealand) Joelle King (Egypt) Nour El Sherbini (Malaysia) Low Wee Wern (Hong Kong) Annie Au
Carol Weymuller Open 2013 (United States) Brooklyn, United States; Gold 50 $50,000 - Draw	3–6 October 2013	(Malaysia) Nicol David; 12-10, 11-2, 11-5	(France) Camille Serme	(England) Laura Massaro (Egypt) Raneem El Weleily	(New Zealand) Joelle King (Malaysia) Low Wee Wern (England) Jenny Duncalf (India) Dipika Pallikal
China Squash Open 2013; Shanghai, China; Gold 50 $50,000 - Draw	24–27 October 2013	(Malaysia) Nicol David; 8-11, 6-11, 11-7, 11-7, 11-8	(Egypt) Raneem El Weleily	(New Zealand) Joelle King (Netherlands) Natalie Grinham	(England) Alison Waters (Malaysia) Low Wee Wern (England) Jenny Duncalf (India) Dipika Pallikal

=== Silver 35 ===
Tournament	Date	Champion	Runner-up	Semifinalists	Quarterfinalists
Greenwich Open 2013 (United States) New York City, United States; Silver 35 $35,000	25–28 January 2013	(Egypt) Nour El Sherbini; 11-7 5-11 11-7 5-11 14-12	(Malaysia) Low Wee Wern	(Australia) Kasey Brown (France) Camille Serme	(Egypt) Raneem El Weleily (Republic of Ireland) Madeline Perry (India) Dipika Pallikal (Egypt) Nour El Tayeb
Texas Open 2013 (United States) Dallas, United States; Silver 35 $35,000	9–12 May 2013	(Republic of Ireland) Madeline Perry; 9-11 11-8 8-11 11-5 11-6	(Netherlands) Natalie Grinham	(New Zealand) Joelle King (England) Jenny Duncalf	(Australia) Kasey Brown (Australia) Rachael Grinham (England) Sarah-Jane Perry (Japan) Misaki Kobayashi
Macau Open 2013; Macau, China; Silver 35 $35,000	17–20 October 2013	(India) Dipika Pallikal; 12-10 5-11 11-7 11-9	(Australia) Rachael Grinham	(Netherlands) Natalie Grinham (Hong Kong) Joey Chan	(Hong Kong) Annie Au (India) Joshna Chinappa (England) Emma Beddoes (Malaysia) Delia Arnold

=== Silver 25 ===
Tournament	Date	Champion	Runner-up	Semifinalists	Quarterfinalists
Tournament of Champions 2013 (United States) New York City, United States; Silver 25 $25,000	21–24 January 2013	(Netherlands) Natalie Grinham; 11-6 11-6 11-5	(Australia) Kasey Brown	(Republic of Ireland) Madeline Perry (Australia) Rachael Grinham	(United States) Amanda Sobhy (Hong Kong) Joey Chan (England) Sarah Kippax (India) Joshna Chinappa
Monte Carlo Classic 2013 (Monaco) Monte Carlo, Monaco; Silver 25 $25,000	28 October - 1 November 2013	(France) Camille Serme; 11-7, 17-15, 9-11, 11-8	(England) Laura Massaro	(Netherlands) Natalie Grinham (Egypt) Nouran Gohar	(Guyana) Nicolette Fernandes (Republic of Ireland) Aisling Blake (United States) Latasha Khan (Egypt) Heba El Torky

== Year end world top 10 players ==
Rank	2013	
1	(Malaysia) Nicol David	3499.38
2	(England) Laura Massaro	2278.94
3	(Egypt) Raneem El Weleily	1656.25
4	(England) Alison Waters	1185.94
5	(France) Camille Serme	1071.88
6	(New Zealand) Joelle King	1040.29
7	(England) Jenny Duncalf	952.94
8	(Malaysia) Low Wee Wern	904.71
9	(Netherlands) Natalie Grinham	902.29
10	(Republic of Ireland) Madeline Perry	867.58

== Retirements ==
Following is a list of notable players (winners of a main tour title, and/or part of the WSA World Rankings top 30 for at least one month) who announced their retirement from professional squash, became inactive, or were permanently banned from playing, during the 2013 season:

- (New Zealand) Jaclyn Hawkes (born 3 December 1982 in the Hong Kong) joined the pro tour in 2003, reached the singles no. 12 spot in December 2012. She won 3 WSA World Tour titles. She retired in January 2013 after losing in the first round of the Carol Weymuller Open in September 2012.
- Lauren Briggs (born 8 August 1979 in the Stanford-Le-Hope) joined the pro tour in 1999, reached the singles no. 18 spot in December 2008. She won 12 WSA World Tour titles, winning in America, Finland, France, Holland, Malaysia, Switzerland, England, Scotland and Wales. She retired in November after competing a last time in the British Open.

== See also ==
- Women's Squash Association (WSA)
- WSA World Series 2013
- WSA World Series Finals
- WSA World Open
- Official Women's Squash World Ranking
- PSA World Tour 2013
