= 2010 Women's World Open Squash Championship =

Women's World Open 2010
- 27th WISPA World Squash Championship
- Location: Sharm El Sheikh, Egypt
- Date(s): September 15–22, 2010
- Website www.sohosquareworldopen.com/2010

WISPA World Tour
- Category: WISPA World Open
- Prize money: $147,000

Results
- Champion: (Malaysia) Nicol David
- Runner-up: (Egypt) Omneya Abdel Kawy
- Semi-finalists: (England) Alison Waters (France) Camille Serme

The 2010 Women's World Open Squash Championship was the women's edition of the World Open, which serves as the individual world championship for squash players. It was part of the WISPA Platinum series of the Women's International Squash Players' Association (WISPA) World Tour. The 2010 event took place in Soho Square, Sharm El Sheikh in Egypt from 15 to 22 September 2010.

== Prize money and ranking points ==
For 2010, the prize purse was $147,000. The prize money and points breakdown is as follows:

Prize Money World Open (2010)
| Event | W | F | SF | QF | 2R | 1R |
| Points (WISPA) | 5300 | 3630 | 2150 | 1150 | 575 | 330 |
| Prize money | $22,440 | $15,180 | $8,910 | $5,280 | $2,970 | $1,650 |

== Seeds ==
1. (Malaysia) Nicol David (champion)
2. (England) Jenny Duncalf (quarterfinals)
3. (England) Alison Waters (semifinals)
4. (Egypt) Omneya Abdel Kawy (final)
5. (Republic of Ireland) Madeline Perry (second round)
6. (United States) Natalie Grainger (second round)
7. (Netherlands) Natalie Grinham (first round)
8. (Netherlands) Laura Massaro (second round)
9. (France) Camille Serme (semifinals)
10. (Australia) Kasey Brown (quarterfinals)
11. (Egypt) Raneem El Weleily (second round)
12. (Egypt) Engy Kheirallah (second round)
13. (Mexico) Samantha Terán (first round)
14. (Netherlands) Vanessa Atkinson (quarterfinals)
15. (New Zealand) Jaclyn Hawkes (second round)
16. (Hong Kong) Annie Au (second round)

== Draw and results ==
First round
1 | (Malaysia) N David | 11 | 11 | 11
Q | (Egypt) FA Meguid | 2 | 3 | 5
11 | (Egypt) R El Weleily | 11 | 11 | 11
Q | (Egypt) N El Sherbini | 3 | 3 | 7
7 | (Netherlands) N Grinham | 9 | 11 | 11 | 7 | 11
(Malaysia) LW Wern | 11 | 9 | 7 | 11 | 13
13 | (Mexico) S Terán | 8 | 10 | 3
(France) I Stoehr | 11 | 12 | 11
3 | (England) A Waters | 11 | 11 | 11
Q | (Egypt) KE El Defrawy | 2 | 2 | 3
16 | (Hong Kong) A Au | 11 | 11 | 11
Q | (Egypt) N E Tayeb | 8 | 8 | 8
6 | (United States) N Grainger | 11 | 5 | 11 | 11
(England) S Kipppax | 5 | 11 | 2 | 6
14 | (Netherlands) V Atkinson | 11 | 9 | 11 | 9 | 14
Q | (South Africa) T Swartz | 4 | 11 | 5 | 11 | 12
Q | (Italy) M Manetta | 4 | 5 | 3
10 | (Australia) K Brown | 11 | 11 | 11
(Malaysia) D Arnold | 10 | 9 | 5
5 | (Republic of Ireland) M Perry | 12 | 11 | 11
(Australia) D Urquhart | 5 | 5 | 3
15 | (New Zealand) J Hawkes | 11 | 11 | 11
Q | (England) T Bailey | 7 | 11 | 8 | 8
4 | (Egypt) OA Kawy | 11 | 6 | 11 | 11
Q | (Netherlands) A Naudé | 11 | 12 | 4 | 4
9 | (France) C Serme | 9 | 14 | 11 | 11
(Republic of Ireland) A Blake | 3 | 3 | 1
8 | (England) L Massaro | 11 | 11 | 11
(New Zealand) J King | 11 | 10 | 8 | 10
12 | (Egypt) E Kheirallah | 2 | 12 | 11 | 12
bye
2 | (England) J Duncalf

Second round
1 | (Malaysia) N David | 11 | 11 | 11
11 | (Egypt) R El Weleily | 7 | 7 | 7
(Malaysia) LW Wern | 8 | 11 | 11 | 11
(France) I Stoehr | 11 | 7 | 5 | 8
3 | (England) A Waters | 11 | 11 | 14
16 | (Hong Kong) A Au | 2 | 7 | 12
6 | (United States) N Grainger | 11 | 11 | 11 | 11 | 9
14 | (Netherlands) V Atkinson | 2 | 9 | 13 | 13 | 11
10 | (Australia) K Brown | 11 | 9 | 11 | 11
5 | (Republic of Ireland) M Perry | 7 | 11 | 8 | 8
15 | (New Zealand) J Hawkes | 8 | 11 | 4
4 | (Egypt) OA Kawy | 11 | 13 | 11
9 | (France) C Serme | 11 | 8 | 12 | 3 | 11
8 | (England) L Massaro | 6 | 11 | 10 | 11 | 6
12 | (Egypt) E Kheirallah | 9 | 9 | 2
2 | (England) J Duncalf | 11 | 11 | 11

Quarter finals
1 | (Malaysia) N David | 11 | 11 | 11
(Malaysia) LW Wern | 2 | 5 | 2
3 | (England) A Waters | 9 | 11 | 11 | 10 | 11
14 | (Netherlands) V Atkinson | 11 | 4 | 7 | 12 | 8
10 | (Australia) K Brown | 8 | 12 | 11 | 5
4 | (Egypt) OA Kawy | 11 | 14 | 6 | 11
9 | (France) C Serme | 8 | 11 | 7 | 11 | 11
2 | (England) J Duncalf | 11 | 7 | 11 | 2 | 5

Semi finals
1 | (Malaysia) N David | 14 | 11 | 11
3 | (England) A Waters | 12 | 2 | 6
Final
1 | (Malaysia) N David | 11 | 11 | 11
4 | (Egypt) OA Kawy | 5 | 8 | 6
4 | (Egypt) OA Kawy | 11 | 11 | 11
9 | (France) C Serme | 4 | 7 | 6

== See also ==
- World Open
- 2010 Men's World Open Squash Championship
- 2010 Women's World Team Squash Championships

| Preceded by Netherlands (Amsterdam); 2009 | WISPA World Open; Egypt (Sharm El Sheikh); 2010 | Succeeded by Netherlands (Rotterdam) 2011 |
| Preceded by Hong Kong Open; Hong Kong; 2010 | WISPA World Series 2010; World Open; Egypt (Sharm El Sheikh); 2010 | Succeeded by Qatar Classic; Qatar (Doha); 2010 |
