= Women's Macau Open 2016 =

Macau Open 2016
- 8th Women's Macau Open

Details
- Event name: Macau Open 2016
- Location: Macau China
- Website www.squashsite.co.uk/2009/macau2016.htm

Women's Winner
- Category: International 50
- Prize money: $50,000
- Year: World Tour 2016

The Women's Macau Open 2016 is the women's edition of the 2016 Macau Open, which is a tournament of the PSA World Tour event International (prize money: $50,000). The event will take place in Macau, China from 15 September to 18 September.

== Prize money and ranking points ==
For 2016, the prize purse was $50,000. The prize money and points breakdown was as follows:

Prize money Macau Open (2016)
Event	W	F	SF	QF	1R
Points (PSA)	875	575	350	215	125
Prize money	$8,075	$5,525	$3,615	$2,230	$1,275

== Seeds ==
1. (New Zealand) Joelle King (winner)
2. (Hong Kong) Annie Au (final)
3. (Malaysia) Delia Arnold (semi-finals)
4. (England) Emily Whitlock (semi-finals)
5. (Hong Kong) Joey Chan (quarter-finals)
6. (Australia) Donna Urquhart (quarter-finals)
7. (Egypt) Heba El Torky (first round)
8. (Denmark) Line Hansen (quarter-finals)

== Draw and results ==
First round
1	(New Zealand) Joelle King	11	11	11
Q	(South Africa) Siyoli Waters	4	9	8
(United States) Olivia Blatchford	10	7	11	5
8	(Denmark) Line Hansen	12	11	5	11
7	(Egypt) Heba El Torky	9	11	11	7
Q	(Egypt) Mayar Hany	11	2	13	11
WC	(Macau) Liu Kwai Chi	2	5	3
3	(Malaysia) Delia Arnold	11	11	11
4	(England) Emily Whitlock	11	11	11
Q	(Egypt) Hana Moataz	4	7	6
(Hong Kong) Liu Tsz Ling	8	11	3	13	2
6	(Australia) Donna Urquhart	11	8	11	11	11
5	(Hong Kong) Joey Chan	11	11	9	11
Q	(Egypt) Nada Abbas	5	9	11	4
(France) Coline Aumard	8	12	7	9
2	(Hong Kong) Annie Au	11	10	11	11

Quarter finals
1	(New Zealand) Joelle King	8	11	11	11
8	(Denmark) Line Hansen	11	5	7	7
Q	(Egypt) Mayar Hany	9	6	8
3	(Malaysia) Delia Arnold	11	11	11
4	(England) Emily Whitlock	11	11	11
7	(Australia) Donna Urquhart	9	8	9
5	(Hong Kong) Joey Chan	5	8	12	5
2	(Hong Kong) Annie Au	11	11	10	11

Semi finals
1	(New Zealand) Joelle King	11	11	7	11
3	(Malaysia) Delia Arnold	6	7	11	2
4	(England) Emily Whitlock	1	9	3
2	(Hong Kong) Annie Au	11	11	11

Final
1	(New Zealand) Joelle King	5	11	11	11
2	(Hong Kong) Annie Au	11	8	3	9

== See also ==
- 2016 PSA World Tour
- Men's Macau Open 2016
- Macau Open
