= Women's Kuala Lumpur Open Squash Championships 2013 =

Women's squash competition

Kuala Lumpur Open Squash Championships 2013

Details
- Event name: CIMB Kuala Lumpur Open Squash Championships 2013
- Location: Kuala Lumpur Malaysia
- Venue: Berjaya Times Square
- Website klopensquash.com

Women's Winner
- Category: World Series Gold
- Prize money: $70,000
- Year: World Tour 2013

The Women's CIMB Kuala Lumpur Open Squash Championships 2013 is the women's edition of the 2013 Kuala Lumpur Open Squash Championships, which is a tournament of the WSA World Series event Gold (prize money: 70 000 $). The event took place in Kuala Lumpur in Malaysia from 27 March to 31 March. Laura Massaro won her first CIMB Kuala Lumpur Open trophy, beating Alison Waters in the final.

== Prize money and ranking points ==
For 2013, the prize purse was $70,000. The prize money and points breakdown is as follows:

Prize money CIMB Kuala Lumpur Open (2013)
Event	W	F	SF	QF	2R	1R
Points (WSA)	3360	2310	1365	735	365,5	210
Prize money	$10,200	$6,900	$4,050	$2,400	$1,350	$750

== Seeds ==
1. (Malaysia) Nicol David (semifinals)
2. (Egypt) Raneem El Weleily (second round)
3. (England) Laura Massaro (champion)
4. (Egypt) Nour El Sherbini (quarterfinals)
5. (England) Alison Waters (final)
6. (Malaysia) Low Wee Wern (second round)
7. (New Zealand) Joelle King (semifinals)
8. (England) Jenny Duncalf (quarterfinals)
9. (France) Camille Serme (second round)
10. (Hong Kong) Annie Au (second round)
11. (Netherlands) Natalie Grinham (quarterfinals)
12. (Republic of Ireland) Madeline Perry (quarterfinals)
13. (Australia) Kasey Brown (second round)
14. (Egypt) Omneya Abdel Kawy (second round)
15. (India) Dipika Pallikal (second round)
16. (Australia) Rachael Grinham (first round)

== Draw and results ==
First round
1	(Malaysia) Nicol David	11	11	11
Q	(South Africa) Siyoli Waters	6	8	6
14	(Egypt) Omneya Abdel Kawy	11	11	8	10	11
(Republic of Ireland) Aisling Blake	7	8	11	12	9
8	(England) Jenny Duncalf	11	11	11
Q	(New Zealand) Kylie Lindsay	1	3	5
15	(India) Dipika Pallikal	11	11	11
Q	(Scotland) Lisa Aitken	7	7	7
3	(England) Laura Massaro	11	11	19
(United States) Latasha Khan	7	4	17
16	(Australia) Rachael Grinham	10	8	7
(Denmark) Line Hansen	12	11	11
6	(Malaysia) Low Wee Wern	11	11	11
(England) Lauren Briggs	5	4	5
12	(Republic of Ireland) Madeline Perry	11	11	11
Q	(Czech Republic) Lucie Fialová	2	5	3
(England) Emily Whitlock	10	9	5
13	(Australia) Kasey Brown	11	11	11
(Hong Kong) Joey Chan	11	3	11	8	7
5	(England) Alison Waters	6	11	8	11	11
Q	(England) Emma Beddoes	9	5	10
10	(Hong Kong) Annie Au	11	11	12
(Egypt) Nour El Tayeb	4	5	11	11	12
4	(Egypt) Nour El Sherbini	11	11	7	9	14
Q	(Guyana) Nicolette Fernandes	4	3	7
9	(France) Camille Serme	11	11	11
Q	(India) Joshna Chinappa	5	4	5
7	(New Zealand) Joelle King	11	11	11
Q	(Malaysia) Zulhijjah Binti Azan	3	3	2
11	(Netherlands) Natalie Grinham	11	11	11
WC	(Malaysia) Delia Arnold	8	7	11	1
2	(Egypt) Raneem El Weleily	11	11	5	11

Second round
1	(Malaysia) Nicol David	11	11	11
14	(Egypt) Omneya Abdel Kawy	9	7	8
8	(England) Jenny Duncalf	11	11	6	11
15	(India) Dipika Pallikal	9	5	11	4
3	(England) Laura Massaro	12	11	11
(Denmark) Line Hansen	10	7	7
6	(Malaysia) Low Wee Wern	10	11	11	8	4
12	(Republic of Ireland) Madeline Perry	12	7	8	11	11
13	(Australia) Kasey Brown	8	11	8	5
5	(England) Alison Waters	11	9	11	11
10	(Hong Kong) Annie Au	10	9	4
4	(Egypt) Nour El Sherbini	12	11	11
9	(France) Camille Serme	10	15	10	12	8
7	(New Zealand) Joelle King	12	13	11	10	11
11	(Netherlands) Natalie Grinham	11	12	11	11
2	(Egypt) Raneem El Weleily	6	14	8	9

Quarter finals
1	(Malaysia) Nicol David	11	11	11
8	(England) Jenny Duncalf	8	7	2
3	(England) Laura Massaro	11	9	11	11
12	(Republic of Ireland) Madeline Perry	2	11	4	5
5	(England) Alison Waters	9	12	11	10	11
4	(Egypt) Nour El Sherbini	11	6	10	12	5
7	(New Zealand) Joelle King	11	11	8	8	12
11	(Netherlands) Natalie Grinham	9	4	11	11	10

Semi finals
1	(Malaysia) Nicol David	12	6	8	5
3	(England) Laura Massaro	10	11	11	11
Final
3	(England) Laura Massaro	11	11	11
5	(England) Alison Waters	9	7	6
5	(England) Alison Waters	12	11	12
7	(New Zealand) Joelle King	10	5	10

== See also ==
- Men's Kuala Lumpur Open Squash Championships 2013
- WSA World Series 2013
- Kuala Lumpur Open Squash Championships

Preceded by World Open; Cayman Island (Grand Cayman); 2012	WSA World Series 2013; Kuala Lumpur Open; Malaysia (Kuala Lumpur); 2013	Succeeded by British Open; England (Hull); 2013
