= Women's Malaysian Open Squash Championships 2013 =

Malaysian Open 2013
- 35th WSA Malaysian Open

Details
- Event name: Malaysian Open Squash Championships 2013
- Location: Kuala Lumpur Malaysia
- Venue: National Squash Centre; Bukit Jalil
- Website www.squashsite.co.uk/2009/malaysianopen2013.htm

Women's Winner
- Category: World Series Gold
- Prize money: $70,000
- Year: World Tour 2013

The Women's Malaysian Open Squash Championships 2013 is the women's edition of the 2013 Malaysian Open Squash Championships, which is a tournament of the WSA World Series event Gold (Prize money : 70 000 $). The event took place in Kuala Lumpur in Malaysia from 11 to 15 September. Nicol David won her eighth Malaysian Open trophy, beating Raneem El Weleily in the final.

== Prize money and ranking points ==
For 2013, the prize purse was $70,000. The prize money and points breakdown is as follows:

Prize Money Malaysian Open (2013)
Event	W	F	SF	QF	2R	1R
Points (WSA)	3360	2310	1365	735	365,5	210
Prize money	$10,200	$6,900	$4,050	$2,400	$1,350	$750

== Seeds ==
1. (Malaysia) Nicol David (champion)
2. (England) Laura Massaro (semifinals)
3. (Egypt) Raneem El Weleily (final)
4. (England) Alison Waters (second round)
5. (New Zealand) Joelle King (quarterfinals)
6. (Malaysia) Low Wee Wern (quarterfinals)
7. (England) Jenny Duncalf (quarterfinals)
8. (Republic of Ireland) Madeline Perry (first round)
9. (Australia) Kasey Brown (second round)
10. (France) Camille Serme (semifinals)
11. (Egypt) Omneya Abdel Kawy (second round)
12. (Hong Kong) Annie Au (second round)
13. (India) Dipika Pallikal (second round)
14. (Australia) Rachael Grinham (second round)
15. (Australia) Donna Urquhart (second round)
16. (England) Sarah-Jane Perry (quarterfinals)

== Draw and results ==
First round
1	(Malaysia) Nicol David	11	11	11
Q	(Scotland) Lisa Aitken	4	6	7
11	(Egypt) Omneya Abdel Kawy	6	11	6	13	11
(Egypt) Nour El Tayeb	11	8	11	11	4
6	(Malaysia) Low Wee Wern	11	11	11
(England) Emily Whitlock	6	6	4
9	(Australia) Kasey Brown	11	11	11
Q	(Malaysia) Delia Arnold	9	11	9
4	(England) Alison Waters	11	11	11
Q	(Egypt) Heba El Torky	3	9	4
10	(France) Camille Serme	6	11	11	11	11
Q	(England) Emma Beddoes	11	6	8	13	5
8	(Republic of Ireland) Madeline Perry	9	6	11	5
(Hong Kong) Joey Chan	11	11	9	11
16	(England) Sarah-Jane Perry	11	11	4	11
Q	(Japan) Misaki Kobayashi	9	9	11	6
(England) Sarah Kippax	11	14	11	8	7
14	(Australia) Rachael Grinham	7	16	9	11	11
(Denmark) Line Hansen	4	11	0	4
7	(England) Jenny Duncalf	11	9	11	11
(Republic of Ireland) Aisling Blake	6	11	11	9
13	(India) Dipika Pallikal	11	3	13	11
(India) Joshna Chinappa	5	5	8
3	(Egypt) Raneem El Weleily	11	11	11
WC	(Malaysia) Rachael Arnold	3	7	4
12	(Hong Kong) Annie Au	11	11	11
Q	(South Africa) Siyoli Waters	5	4	8
5	(New Zealand) Joelle King	11	11	11
Q	(Guyana) Nicolette Fernandes	11	11	11
15	(Australia) Donna Urquhart	3	7	8
Q	(United States) Latasha Khan	5	5	6
2	(England) Laura Massaro	11	11	11

Second round
1	(Malaysia) Nicol David	11	11	11
11	(Egypt) Omneya Abdel Kawy	5	10	6
6	(Malaysia) Low Wee Wern	9	11	11	11
9	(Australia) Kasey Brown	11	4	3	3
4	(England) Alison Waters	9	5	9
10	(France) Camille Serme	11	11	11
(Hong Kong) Joey Chan	9	6	11	8
16	(England) Sarah-Jane Perry	11	11	5	11
14	(Australia) Rachael Grinham	7	11	7	5
7	(England) Jenny Duncalf	11	3	11	11
13	(India) Dipika Pallikal	4	11	7	2
3	(Egypt) Raneem El Weleily	11	9	11	11
12	(Hong Kong) Annie Au	11	8	9
5	(New Zealand) Joelle King	11	11	11
Q	(Guyana) Nicolette Fernandes	5	5	7
2	(England) Laura Massaro	11	11	11

Quarter finals
1	(Malaysia) Nicol David	11	11	3	11
6	(Malaysia) Low Wee Wern	4	6	11	5
10	(France) Camille Serme	11	9	11	11
16	(England) Sarah-Jane Perry	8	11	3	9
7	(England) Jenny Duncalf	11	4	8	5
3	(Egypt) Raneem El Weleily	4	11	11	11
5	(New Zealand) Joelle King	14	9	8	11	3
2	(England) Laura Massaro	12	11	11	8	11

Semi finals
1	(Malaysia) Nicol David *	12	11	11
10	(France) Camille Serme	10	7	6
Final
1	(Malaysia) Nicol David *	11	11	11
3	(Egypt) Raneem El Weleily	8	7	6
3	(Egypt) Rnm El Weleily *	8	11	12	10	11
2	(England) Laura Massaro	11	9	10	12	9

== See also ==
- WSA World Series 2013
- Malaysian Open Squash Championships
- Men's Malaysian Open Squash Championships 2013

Preceded by British Open; England (Hull); 2013	WSA World Series 2013; Malaysian Open; Malaysia (Kuala Lumpur); 2013	Succeeded by US Open; United States (Philadelphia); 2013
