= Women's Hong Kong squash Open 2013 =

Cathay Pacific Hong Kong Open 2013
- 12th WSA Hong Kong Open

Details
- Event name: Cathay Pacific Sun Hung Kai Financial Hong Kong Open 2013
- Location: Hong Kong
- Venue: Hong Kong Squash Centre - Tsim Sha Tsui

Women's Winner
- Category: World Series Gold
- Prize money: $70,000
- Year: World Tour 2013

The Women's Cathay Pacific Hong Kong Open 2013 was the women's edition of the 2013 Hong Kong Open, which is a WSA World Series event Gold (prize money: 70 000 $). The event took place in Hong Kong from 3 December to 8 December. Nicol David won her eighth Hong Kong Open trophy, beating Raneem El Weleily in the final.

== Prize money and ranking points ==
For 2013, the prize purse was $70,000. The prize money and points breakdown is as follows:

Prize money Hong Kong Open (2013)
Event	W	F	SF	QF	2R	1R
Points (WSA)	3360	2310	1365	735	365,5	210
Prize money	$10,200	$6,900	$4,050	$2,400	$1,350	$750

== Seeds ==
1. (Malaysia) Nicol David (champion)
2. (England) Laura Massaro (quarterfinals)
3. (Egypt) Raneem El Weleily (final)
4. (England) Alison Waters (semifinals)
5. (England) Jenny Duncalf (quarterfinals)
6. (Malaysia) Low Wee Wern (first round)
7. (Netherlands) Natalie Grinham (first round)
8. (Republic of Ireland) Madeline Perry (second round)
9. (France) Camille Serme (second round)
10. (Australia) Kasey Brown (first round)
11. (Egypt) Omneya Abdel Kawy (quarterfinals)
12. (Hong Kong) Annie Au (semifinals)
13. (Australia) Rachael Grinham (second round)
14. (India) Dipika Pallikal (first round)
15. (Denmark) Line Hansen (second round)
16. (Guyana) Nicolette Fernandes (second round)

== Draw and results ==
First round
1	(Malaysia) Nicol David	11	11	11
Q	(Canada) Samantha Cornett	5	7	4
9	(France) Camille Serme	11	11	9	11
(England) Emily Whitlock	6	4	11	7
5	(England) Jenny Duncalf	11	12	6	11
(Hong Kong) Joey Chan	9	10	11	8
16	(Guyana) Nicolette Fernandes	11	11	12
(Australia) Donna Urquhart	7	9	10
4	(England) Alison Waters	11	11	11
Q	(Japan) Misaki Kobayashi	3	5	5
10	(Australia) Kasey Brown	12	8	11	4	8
Q	(Wales) Tesni Evans	10	11	7	11	11
7	(Netherlands) Natalie Grinham	8	8	4
(India) Joshna Chinappa	11	11	11
15	(Denmark) Line Hansen	11	12	11
(England) Sarah Kippax	6	10	9
(South Africa) Siyoli Waters	16	4	6	6
11	(Egypt) Omneya Abdel Kawy	14	11	11	11
Q	(Egypt) Mariam Metwally	6	11	3	6
8	(Republic of Ireland) Madeline Perry	11	7	11	11
(Egypt) Nour El Tayeb	15	11	11
14	(India) Dipika Pallikal	13	6	2
WC	(Hong Kong) Liu Tsz-Ling	7	6	8
3	(Egypt) Raneem El Weleily	11	11	11
Q	(Egypt) Yathreb Adel	9	11	8	11	2
12	(Hong Kong) Annie Au	11	7	11	4	11
Q	(England) Emma Beddoes	8	12	11	11	11
6	(Malaysia) Low Wee Wern	11	14	3	8	5
Q	(Egypt) Salma Hany Ibrahim	9	11	5
13	(Australia) Rachael Grinham	11	13	11
Q	(France) Coline Aumard	2	8	9
2	(England) Laura Massaro	11	11	11

Second round
1	(Malaysia) Nicol David	7	11	11	11
9	(France) Camille Serme	11	4	6	5
5	(England) Jenny Duncalf	12	9	11	6	11
16	(Guyana) Nicolette Fernandes	10	11	6	11	9
4	(England) Alison Waters	11	11	11
Q	(Wales) Tesni Evans	2	4	5
(India) Joshna Chinappa	12	11	9	11
15	(Denmark) Line Hansen	10	8	11	5
11	(Egypt) Omneya Abdel Kawy	12	11	11
8	(Republic of Ireland) Madeline Perry	10	3	5
(Egypt) Nour El Tayeb	9	11	2	8
3	(Egypt) Raneem El Weleily	11	8	11	11
12	(Hong Kong) Annie Au	11	11	11
Q	(England) Emma Beddoes	3	4	6
13	(Australia) Rachael Grinham	8	7	5
2	(England) Laura Massaro	11	11	11

Quarter finals
1	(Malaysia) Nicol David	11	11	11
5	(England) Jenny Duncalf	4	3	3
4	(England) Alison Waters	12	11	11	11
(India) Joshna Chinappa	14	7	3	6
11	(Egypt) Omneya Abdel Kawy	8	9	4
3	(Egypt) Raneem El Weleily	11	11	11
12	(Hong Kong) Annie Au	11	11	9	11
2	(England) Laura Massaro	6	5	11	9

Semi finals
1	(Malaysia) Nicol David	9	13	11	11
4	(England) Alison Waters	11	11	7	7
Final
1	(Malaysia) Nicol David	11	11	12
3	(Egypt) Raneem El Weleily	8	7	10
3	(Egypt) Raneem El Weleily	11	11	11
12	(Hong Kong) Annie Au	6	5	5

== See also ==
- Hong Kong Open (squash)
- Men's Hong Kong squash Open 2013
- WSA World Series 2013

Preceded by US Open; United States (Philadelphia); 2013	WSA World Series 2013; Hong Kong Open; Hong Kong; 2013	Succeeded by World Open; Malaysia (Penang); 2013
