= China Squash Open 2013 =

- 6th WSA China Open

Details
- Event name: Lujiazui Finance City China Open 2013
- Location: Shanghai, China
- Venue: Lujiazui Central Park

Women's Winner
- Category: Gold 50
- Prize money: $50,000
- Year: World Tour 2013

The Lujiazui Finance City China Squash Open 2013 is the women's edition of the 2013 China Squash Open, which is a tournament of the WSA World Tour event International (Prize money : 50 000 $). The event took place in Shanghai in China from 24 October to 27 October. Nicol David won her first China Squash Open trophy, beating Raneem El Weleily in the final.

== Prize money and ranking points ==
For 2013, the prize purse was $50,000. The prize money and points breakdown is as follows:

Prize Money China Squash Open (2013)
Event	W	F	SF	QF	1R
Points (WSA)	2450	1610	980	595	350
Prize money	$8,550	$5,850	$3,825	$2,365	$1,350

== Seeds ==
1. (Malaysia) Nicol David (champion)
2. (Egypt) Raneem El Weleily (final)
3. (England) Alison Waters (quarterfinals)
4. (New Zealand) Joelle King (semifinals)
5. (Malaysia) Low Wee Wern (quarterfinals)
6. (England) Jenny Duncalf (quarterfinals)
7. (Republic of Ireland) Madeline Perry (first round)
8. (Netherlands) Natalie Grinham (semifinals)

== Draw and results ==
First round
1	(Malaysia) Nicol David	11	11	11
WC	(China) Li Dongjin	6	4	2
7	(Republic of Ireland) Madeline Perry	8	7	4
Q	(India) Dipika Pallikal	11	11	11
3	(England) Alison Waters	11	11	11
Q	(Egypt) Nouran Gohar	6	9	5
8	(Netherlands) Natalie Grinham	9	11	11	7	11
(Egypt) Omneya Abdel Kawy	11	7	6	11	6
(Australia) Kasey Brown	5	5	11	4
6	(England) Jenny Duncalf	11	11	5	11
(Hong Kong) Annie Au	11	3	5	3
4	(New Zealand) Joelle King	2	11	11	11
Q	(Australia) Rachael Grinham	4	11	9	11	5
5	(Malaysia) Low Wee Wern	11	7	11	7	11
Q	(Australia) Donna Urquhart	11	4	9	9
2	(Egypt) Raneem El Weleily	8	11	11	11

Quarter finals
1	(Malaysia) Nicol David	11	9	11	11
Q	(India) Dipika Pallikal	6	11	6	6
3	(England) Alison Waters	11	11	17	7	3
8	(Netherlands) Natalie Grinham	5	8	19	11	11
6	(England) Jenny Duncalf	11	4	2	7
4	(New Zealand) Joelle King	7	11	11	11
5	(Malaysia) Low Wee Wern	4	3	12	3
2	(Egypt) Raneem El Weleily	11	11	10	11

Semi finals
1	(Malaysia) Nicol David	13	12	11
8	(Netherlands) Natalie Grinham	11	10	6
4	(New Zealand) Joelle King	5	11	3	6
2	(Egypt) Raneem El Weleily	11	9	11	11

Final
1	(Malaysia) Nicol David	8	6	11	11	11
2	(Egypt) Raneem El Weleily	11	11	7	7	8

== See also ==
- WSA World Tour 2013
- China Squash Open
