= Women's Macau Open 2015 =

Macau Open 2015
- 7th Women's Macau Open

Details
- Event name: Macau Open 2015
- Location: Macau China
- Website www.squashsite.co.uk/2009/macau2015.htm

Women's Winner
- Category: International 50
- Prize money: $50,000
- Year: World Tour 2015

The Women's Macau Open 2015 is the women's edition of the 2015 Macau Open, which is a tournament of the PSA World Tour event International (prize money: $50,000). The event took place in Macau, China from 17 September to 20 September. Laura Massaro won her first Macau Open trophy, beating Nouran Gohar in the final.

== Prize money and ranking points ==
For 2015, the prize purse was $50,000. The prize money and points breakdown was as follows:

Prize money Macau Open (2015)
Event	W	F	SF	QF	1R
Points (WSA)	2450	1610	980	595	350
Prize money	$8,550	$5,850	$3,825	$2,365	$1,350

== Seeds ==
1. (England) Laura Massaro (champion)
2. (Egypt) Nour El Tayeb (quarterfinals)
3. (England) Alison Waters (semifinals)
4. (Hong Kong) Annie Au (semifinals)
5. (New Zealand) Joelle King (quarterfinals)
6. (Australia) Rachael Grinham (first round)
7. (Egypt) Nouran Gohar (final)
8. (England) Jenny Duncalf (first round)

== Draw and results ==
First round
1	(England) Laura Massaro	11	11	11
(India) Dipika Pallikal	9	6	6
Q	(Australia) Donna Urquhart	11	7	11	7	11
8	(England) Jenny Duncalf	3	11	8	11	7
6	(Australia) Rachael Grinham	10	8	5
(England) Emily Whitlock	11	11	11
Q	(India) Joshna Chinappa	8	11	2	4
3	(England) Alison Waters	11	8	11	11
4	(Hong Kong) Annie Au	11	11	11
WC	(Macau) Liu Kwai Chi	1	2	5
(Hong Kong) Joey Chan	6	11	11	7	10
5	(New Zealand) Joelle King	11	6	4	11	12
7	(Egypt) Nouran Gohar	13	11	11
Q	(Egypt) Heba El Torky	11	6	2
(Malaysia) Delia Arnold	2	3	8
2	(Egypt) Nour El Tayeb	11	11	11

Quarter finals
1	(England) Laura Massaro	11	11	11
Q	(Australia) Donna Urquhart	8	7	6
(England) Emily Whitlock	6	7	4
3	(England) Alison Waters	11	11	11
4	(Hong Kong) Annie Au	13	11	9	11
5	(New Zealand) Joelle King	11	8	11	9
7	(Egypt) Nouran Gohar	11	11	8	6	11
2	(Egypt) Nour El Tayeb	7	8	11	11	4

Semi finals
1	(England) Laura Massaro	11	11	7	11
3	(England) Alison Waters	4	9	11	9
4	(Hong Kong) Annie Au	5	6	11	3
7	(Egypt) Nouran Gohar	11	11	8	11

Final
1	(England) Laura Massaro	11	11	11
7	(Egypt) Nouran Gohar	8	3	9

== See also ==
- 2015 PSA World Tour
- Men's Macau Open 2015
- Macau Open
