= 2013 WSA World Series =

WSA World Series 2013

Details
- Event name: WSA World Series 2013
- Website wsaworldtour.com/site/players/world-series-standings
- Year: World Tour 2013

The WSA World Series 2013 is a series of women's squash tournaments which are part of the Women's Squash Association (WSA) World Tour for the 2013 squash season. The WSA World Series tournaments are some of the most prestigious events on the women's tour. Nicol David won the 2013 WSA World Series followed by Laura Massaro and Raneem El Weleily.

== WSA World Series Ranking Points ==
WSA World Series events also have a separate World Series ranking. Points for this are calculated on a cumulative basis after each World Series event.

Tournament			Ranking Points
Rank	Prize Money US$	Ranking Points	Winner	Runner up	3/4	5/8	9/16	17/32
World Series	$70,000+	625 points	100	65	40	25	15	10

== 2013 Tournaments ==
Tournament	Country	Location	Rank	Prize money	Date	2013 Winner
Kuala Lumpur Open Squash Championships 2013	Malaysia	Kuala Lumpur	World Series Gold	$70,000	27–31 March 2013	(England) Laura Massaro
British Open 2013	England	Hull	World Series Platinum	$95,000	21–26 May 2013	(England) Laura Massaro
Malaysian Open 2013	Malaysia	Kuala Lumpur	World Series Gold	$70,000	12–15 September 2013	(Malaysia) Nicol David
US Open 2013	United States	Philadelphia	World Series Platinum	$115,000	13–18 October 2013	(Malaysia) Nicol David
Hong Kong Open 2013	Hong Kong	Hong Kong	World Series Gold	$70,000	4–8 December 2013	(Malaysia) Nicol David

== World Series Standings 2013 ==
Performance Table Legend
10	1st Round	15	Round of 16
25	Quarterfinalist	40	Semifinalist
65	Runner-up	100	Winner

Top 16 World Series Standings 2013
Rank	Player	Number of Tournament	Kuala Lumpur Open	British Open	Malaysian Open	US Open	Hong Kong Open	Total Points
Rank	Player	Number of Tournament	MAS (Malaysia)	ENG (England)	MAS (Malaysia)	USA (United States)	HKG (Hong Kong)	Total Points
1	(Malaysia) Nicol David	5	40	65	100	100	100	405
2	(England) Laura Massaro	5	100	100	40	65	25	330
3	(Egypt) Raneem El Weleily	5	15	40	65	25	65	210
4	(England) Alison Waters	5	65	40	15	25	40	185
5	(New Zealand) Joelle King	4	40	25	25	40	-	130
6	(England) Jenny Duncalf	5	25	25	25	15	25	115
7	(Malaysia) Low Wee Wern	5	15	10	25	40	10	100
8	(France) Camille Serme	5	15	10	40	15	15	95
9	(Egypt) Omneya Abdel Kawy	5	15	25	15	15	25	95
10	(Australia) Kasey Brown	5	15	25	15	25	10	90
11	(Republic of Ireland) Madeline Perry	5	25	15	10	25	15	90
12	(Hong Kong) Annie Au	4	15	15	15	-	40	80
13	(Egypt) Nour El Tayeb	5	10	15	10	15	15	65
14	(Denmark) Line Hansen	5	15	10	10	15	15	65
15	(Guyana) Nicolette Fernandes	5	10	10	15	10	15	60
16	(India) Joshna Chinappa	3	10	10	10	-	25	55

== See also ==
- PSA World Series 2013
- WSA World Tour 2013
- Official Women's Squash World Ranking
