= 2013 Women's British Open Squash Championship =

British Open Squash Championships
- 83rd Women's British Open

Details
- Event name: Allam British Open 2013
- Location: (United Kingdom) Hull, England
- Venue: KC Stadium
- Website www.britishopensquash.net

Women's Winner
- Category: World Series Platinum
- Prize money: $95,000
- Year: World Tour 2013

The Women's Allam British Open 2013 is the women's edition of the 2013 British Open Squash Championships, which is a WSA World Series event Platinum (Prize money: $95 000). The event took place at the KC Stadium in Hull in England from 20 May to 26 May. Laura Massaro won her first British Open trophy, beating Nicol David in the final.

== Prize money and ranking points ==
For 2013, the prize purse was $95,000. The prize money and points breakdown is as follows:

Prize Money British Open (2013)
Event	W	F	SF	QF	2R	1R
Points (WSA)	4800	3300	1950	1050	525	300
Prize money	$13,600	$9,200	$5,400	$3,200	$1,800	$1,000

== Seeds ==
1. (Malaysia) Nicol David (final)
2. (England) Laura Massaro (champion)
3. (Egypt) Raneem El Weleily (semifinals)
4. (England) Alison Waters (semifinals)
5. (Egypt) Nour El Sherbini (second round)
6. (New Zealand) Joelle King (quarterfinals)
7. (Malaysia) Low Wee Wern (first round)
8. (England) Jenny Duncalf (quarterfinals)
9. (France) Camille Serme (first round)
10. (Netherlands) Natalie Grinham (first round)
11. (Republic of Ireland) Madeline Perry (second round)
12. (Australia) Kasey Brown (quarterfinals)
13. (Hong Kong) Annie Au (second round)
14. (Egypt) Omneya Abdel Kawy (quarterfinals)
15. (India) Dipika Pallikal (second round)
16. (Australia) Rachael Grinham (second round)

== Draw and results ==
First round
1	(Malaysia) Nicol David	11	11	11
Q	(India) Joshna Chinappa	4	5	4
10	(Netherlands) Natalie Grinham	11	11	6	11	7
(England) Sarah Kippax	9	13	11	9	11
6	(New Zealand) Joelle King	11	11	11
Q	(Canada) Samantha Cornett	8	7	8
13	(Hong Kong) Annie Au	11	8	11	11
(Republic of Ireland) Aisling Blake	9	11	6	6
4	(England) Alison Waters	11	11	11	11
WC	(England) Emily Whitlock	13	7	7	9
16	(Australia) Rachael Grinham	10	1	11	11	11
Q	(Guyana) Nicolette Fernandes	12	11	7	9	8
7	(Malaysia) Low Wee Wern	7	11	11	9
(England) Sarah-Jane Perry	11	13	7	11
12	(Australia) Kasey Brown	11	11	11
Q	(England) Lauren Briggs	6	5	7
(Egypt) Nour El Tayeb	10	11	11	11
9	(France) Camille Serme	12	6	7	5
Q	(United States) Latasha Khan	4	2	2
8	(England) Jenny Duncalf	11	11	11
Q	(England) Emma Beddoes	10	8	9
11	(Republic of Ireland) Madeline Perry	12	11	11
Q	(Malaysia) Delia Arnold	11	7	3	4
3	(Egypt) Raneem El Weleily	8	11	11	11
(Australia) Donna Urquhart	9	4	4
14	(Egypt) Omneya Abdel Kawy	11	11	11
Q	(United States) Amanda Sobhy	10	11	12	7
5	(Egypt) Nour El Sherbini	12	9	14	11
(Denmark) Line Hansen	11	16	6	11	4
15	(India) Dipika Pallikal	13	14	11	8	11
(Hong Kong) Joey Chan	12	1	6
2	(England) Laura Massaro	14	11	11

1* Second round 2*
1	(Malaysia) Nicol David	11	14	11
(England) Sarah Kippax	2	12	2
6	(New Zealand) Joelle King	11	11	11
13	(Hong Kong) Annie Au	5	7	5
4	(England) Alison Waters	11	11	8	7	11
16	(Australia) Rachael Grinham	2	4	11	11	4
(England) Sarah-Jane Perry	11	11	10	7	10
12	(Australia) Kasey Brown	8	9	12	11	12
(Egypt) Nour El Tayeb	12	4	4
8	(England) Jenny Duncalf	14	11	11
11	(Republic of Ireland) Madeline Perry	7	10	5
3	(Egypt) Raneem El Weleily	11	12	11
14	(Egypt) Omneya Abdel Kawy	16	11	11
5	(Egypt) Nour El Sherbini	14	7	8
15	(India) Dipika Pallikal	11	10	9	6
2	(England) Laura Massaro	7	12	11	11

Quarter finals
1	(Malaysia) Nicol David	13	11	11
6	(New Zealand) Joelle King	11	8	1
4	(England) Alison Waters	11	11	11
12	(Australia) Kasey Brown	4	3	4
8	(England) Jenny Duncalf	11	6	4	5
3	(Egypt) Raneem El Weleily	9	11	11	11
14	(Egypt) Omneya Abdel Kawy	7	6	11	8
2	(England) Laura Massaro	11	11	9	11

Semi finals *
1	(Malaysia) Nicol David	11	11	11
4	(England) Alison Waters	5	4	5
Final
1	(Malaysia) Nicol David	4	11	10	7
2	(England) Laura Massaro *	11	3	12	11
3	(Egypt) Raneem El Weleily	11	6	8	9
2	(England) Laura Massaro	8	11	11	11

== See also ==
- WSA World Series 2013
- 2013 Men's British Open

Preceded by Kuala Lumpur Open; Malaysia (Kuala Lumpur); 2013	WSA World Series 2013; British Open; England (Hull); 2013	Succeeded by Malaysian Open; Malaysia (Kuala Lumpur); 2013
