= The Houston Open 2016 =

2016 squash tournament in Houston

- 4th The Houston Open

Details
- Event name: The Houston Open 2016
- Location: Houston, United States
- Website www.squashsite.co.uk/2016/houston2016.htm

Men's Winner
- Category: International 50
- Prize money: $50,000
- Year: World Tour 2016

The Houston Open 2016 is the men's edition of the 2016 Houston Open, which is a tournament of the PSA World Tour event International (Prize money: $50,000). The event took place in Houston in the United States from 12 September to 15 May. Marwan El Shorbagy won his first Houston Open trophy, beating Mohamed Abouelghar in the final.

== Prize money and ranking points ==
For 2016, the prize purse was $50,000. The prize money and points breakdown was as follows:

Prize Money Houston Open (2016)
| Event | W | F | SF | QF | 1R |
| Points (PSA) | 875 | 575 | 350 | 215 | 125 |
| Prize money | $8,075 | $5,525 | $3,615 | $2,230 | $1,275 |

== Seeds ==
1. (Egypt) Marwan El Shorbagy (Champion)
2. (Australia) Ryan Cuskelly (Semifinals)
3. (Egypt) Mazen Hesham (Semifinals)
4. (Egypt) Mohamed Abouelghar (Final)
5. (South Africa) Stephen Coppinger (Quarterfinals)
6. (France) Grégoire Marche (Quarterfinals)
7. (Egypt) Zahed Mohamed (Quarterfinals)
8. (Egypt) Omar Abdel Meguid (Quarterfinals)

== Draw and results ==
First round
1 | (Egypt) Marwan El Shorbagy | 12 | 11 | 11
Q | (Finland) Olli Tuominen | 10 | 6 | 5
(Malaysia) Mohd Nafiizwan Adnan | 9 | 11 | 5
5 | (South Africa) Stephen Coppinger | 11 | 13 | 11
8 | (Egypt) Omar Abdel Meguid | 11 | 21 | 11
WC | (Pakistan) Shahjahan Khan | 5 | 19 | 1
Q | (New Zealand) Campbell Grayson | 13 | 5 | 6 | 10
3 | (Egypt) Mazen Hesham | 11 | 11 | 11 | 12
4 | (Egypt) Mohd Abouelghar | 7 | 11 | 7 | 11 | 11
(Peru) Diego Elías | 11 | 4 | 11 | 8 | 4
(Mexico) César Salazar | 19 | 2 | 11 | 8
6 | (France) Grégoire Marche | 17 | 11 | 13 | 11
7 | (Egypt) Zahed Mohamed | 7 | 11 | 11 | 11
(Switzerland) Reiko Peter | 11 | 8 | 9 | 6
(Finland) Henrik Mustonen | 7 | 4 | 3
2 | (Australia) Ryan Cuskelly | 11 | 11 | 11

Quarter finals
1 | (Egypt) Marwan El Shorbagy | 11 | 11 | 6 | 11
5 | (South Africa) Stephen Coppinger | 8 | 6 | 11 | 8
8 | (Egypt) Omar Abdel Meguid | 11 | 11 | 6 | 9 | 9
3 | (Egypt) Mazen Hesham | 5 | 8 | 11 | 11 | 11
4 | (Egypt) Mohd Abouelghar | 7 | 11 | 11 | 11
6 | (France) Grégoire Marche | 11 | 4 | 6 | 9
7 | (Egypt) Zahed Mohamed | 8 | 8 | 11 | 8
2 | (Australia) Ryan Cuskelly | 11 | 11 | 7 | 11

Semi finals
1 | (Egypt) Marwan El Shorbagy | 11 | 7 | 11 | 10 | 11
3 | (Egypt) Mazen Hesham | 6 | 11 | 8 | 12 | 9
4 | (Egypt) Mohd Abouelghar | 11 | 11 | 5 | 11
2 | (Australia) Ryan Cuskelly | 6 | 6 | 11 | 7

Final
1 | (Egypt) Marwan El Shorbagy | 11 | 9 | 11 | 11
4 | (Egypt) Mohamed Abouelghar | 7 | 11 | 9 | 3

== See also ==
- 2016 PSA World Tour
- Houston Open (squash)
