= Carol Weymuller Open 2013 =

- 38th Carol Weymuller Open

Details
- Event name: Carol Weymuller Open 2013
- Location: Brooklyn, New York, United States
- Venue: The Heights Casino
- Website www.squashsite.co.uk/2009/carolweymuller2013.htm

Women's Winner
- Category: Gold 50
- Prize money: $50,000
- Year: World Tour 2013

The Carol Weymuller Open 2013 is the women's edition of the 2013 Carol Weymuller Open, which is a tournament of the WSA World Tour event Gold (Prize money : $50 000 ). The event took place at The Heights Casino in Brooklyn, New York in the United States from 3 to 6 October. Nicol David won her second Carol Weymuller Open trophy, beating Camille Serme in straight sets in the final.

== Prize money and ranking points ==
For 2013, the prize purse was $50,000. The prize money and points breakdown is as follows:

Prize Money Carol Weymuller Open (2013)
Event	W	F	SF	QF	1R
Points (WSA)	2450	1610	980	595	350
Prize money	$8,550	$5,850	$3,825	$2,365	$1,350

== Seeds ==
1. (Malaysia) Nicol David (champion)
2. (England) Laura Massaro (semifinals)
3. (Egypt) Raneem El Weleily (semifinals)
4. (England) Alison Waters (first round)
5. (New Zealand) Joelle King (quarterfinals)
6. (Malaysia) Low Wee Wern (quarterfinals)
7. (England) Jenny Duncalf (quarterfinals)
8. (Australia) Kasey Brown (first round)

== Draw and results ==
First round
1	(Malaysia) Nicol David	11	11	11
(Australia) Donna Urquhart	8	6	4
8	(Australia) Kasey Brown	11	12	11	8	9
(India) Dipika Pallikal	6	10	13	11	11
3	(Egypt) Raneem El Weleily	12	11	11
Q	(Denmark) Line Hansen	10	7	4
5	(New Zealand) Joelle King	11	11	11
(Egypt) Omneya Abdel Kawy	7	4	8
Q	(England) Victoria Lust	5	5	4
7	(England) Jenny Duncalf	11	11	11
(France) Camille Serme	11	11	4	11
4	(England) Alison Waters	7	11	11	9
Q	(Guyana) Nicolette Fernandes	11	7	11	3
6	(Malaysia) Low Wee Wern	13	11	4	11
Q	(Republic of Ireland) Aisling Blake	4	7	6
2	(England) Laura Massaro	11	11	11

Quarter finals
1	(Malaysia) Nicol David	11	11	11
(India) Dipika Pallikal	7	5	4
3	(Egypt) Raneem El Weleily	11	11	11
5	(New Zealand) Joelle King	6	7	9
7	(England) Jenny Duncalf	7	7	7
(France) Camille Serme	11	11	11
6	(Malaysia) Low Wee Wern	8	10	6
2	(England) Laura Massaro	11	12	11

Semi finals
1	(Malaysia) Nicol David	11	11	11
3	(Egypt) Raneem El Weleily	8	7	4
(France) Camille Serme	12	11	11
2	(England) Laura Massaro	10	6	4

Final
1	(Malaysia) Nicol David	12	11	11
(France) Camille Serme	10	2	5

== See also ==
- WSA World Tour 2013
- Carol Weymuller Open
