= Houston Open (squash) =

The Houston Open

Details
- Event name: The Houston Open
- Location: Houston, United States
- Venue: Life Time Athletic Club
- Website; Official website

Men's Winner
- Category: PSA Challenger Tour 30
- Prize money: $30,000
- Most recent champion(s): (New Zealand) Campbell Grayson (2019)
- Year: 2013–

The Houston Open is a squash tournament held in Houston in the Life Time Athletic Club in May. It is part of the PSA World Tour.

== Past Results ==
Year	Champion	Runner-up	Score in final
2020	Cancelled due to COVID-19 pandemic in the United States		
2019	(New Zealand) Campbell Grayson	(Scotland) Alan Clyne	11–5, 11–9, 9–11, 11–7
2017	(Egypt) Karim Abdel Gawad	(Egypt) Tarek Momen	11–6, 5–11, 11–8, 11–6
2016	(Egypt) Marwan El Shorbagy	(Egypt) Mohamed Abouelghar	11–7, 9–11, 11–9, 11–3
2015	(Egypt) Mazen Hesham	(England) Adrian Grant	11–6, 11–5, 11–5
2014	(South Africa) Stephen Coppinger	(Egypt) Mazen Hesham	11–7, 8–11, 11–5, 11–7
2013	(New Zealand) Campbell Grayson	(Mexico) César Salazar	11–5, 11–6, 11–7
