= Macau Open (squash) =

Details
- Event name: Macau Open
- Location: Macau China

Men's Winner
- Category: World Tour Bronze
- Prize money: $54,400
- Most recent champion(s): (Peru) Diego Elías
- Current: Men's Macau Open 2017

Women's Winner
- Category: World Tour Bronze
- Prize money: $54,400
- Most recent champion(s): (Hong Kong) Annie Au
- Current: Women's Macau Open 2017

The Macau Open is a squash tournament held in Macau, China in October. It is part of the PSA World Tour and the WSA World Tour.

== Past Results ==
=== Men's ===
Year	Champion	Runner-up	Score in final
2020	Cancelled due to COVID-19 pandemic in Macau		
2019	(Peru) Diego Elías	(Egypt) Omar Mosaad	11-3, 11-4, 11-9
2018	(Hong Kong) Yip Tsz Fung	(Egypt) Omar Mosaad	9-11, 6-11, 11-4, 11-5, 11-7
2017	(Egypt) Mohamed Abouelghar	(India) Saurav Ghosal	11-1, 11-4, 11-4
2016	(England) Daryl Selby	(Hong Kong) Max Lee	w/o
2015	(Hong Kong) Max Lee	(Egypt) Fares Dessouky	11-9, 11-6, 11-0
2014	(Egypt) Tarek Momen	(Egypt) Omar Mosaad	6-11, 11-5, 11-7, 4-11, 12-10
2013	(Egypt) Omar Mosaad	(England) Adrian Grant	11-8, 4-11, 9-11, 11-9, 11-8
2012	(Egypt) Karim Darwish	(Egypt) Mohamed El Shorbagy	9-11, 11-7, 10-12, 11-4, 11-9
2011	(Egypt) Mohamed El Shorbagy	(France) Thierry Lincou	11-13, 11-5, 11-5, 11-7
2010	No competition		
2009	No competition		
2008	(France) Grégory Gaultier	(Egypt) Karim Darwish	11-6, 11-9, 11-5
2007	No competition		
2006	No competition		
2005	No competition		
2004	No competition		
2003	No competition		
2002	No competition		
2001	(Malaysia) Ong Beng Hee	(Belgium) Stefan Casteleyn	15-10, 15-11, 15-4
2000	(Egypt) Omar El Borolossy	(Malaysia) Ong Beng Hee	17-16, 15-10, 17-15
1999	No competition		
1998	(Hong Kong) Faheem Khan	(Australia) Ben Gould	15-11, 17-15, 15-5
1997	(Hong Kong) Faheem Khan	(Spain) Oriol Salvia	

=== Women's ===
Year	Champion	Runner-up	Score in final
2020	Cancelled due to COVID-19 pandemic in Macau		
2019	(Hong Kong) Annie Au	(Malaysia) Low Wee Wern	11-5, 13-11, 11-8
2018	(Egypt) Nouran Gohar	(Egypt) Salma Hany	11-8, 11-8, 9-11, 11-7
2017	(Egypt) Nouran Gohar	(New Zealand) Joelle King	13-11, 11-7, 12-10
2016	(New Zealand) Joelle King	(Hong Kong) Annie Au	5-11, 11-8, 11-3, 11-9
2015	(England) Laura Massaro	(Egypt) Nouran Gohar	11-8, 11-3, 11-9
2014	(Malaysia) Nicol David	(Egypt) Raneem El Weleily	11-8, 11-2, 11-8
2013	(India) Dipika Pallikal	(Australia) Rachael Grinham	12-10 5-11 11-7 11-9
2012	(New Zealand) Joelle King	(Egypt) Omneya Abdel Kawy	11-5, 11-1, 9-11, 6-11, 11-6
2011	(Hong Kong) Joey Chan	(Republic of Ireland) Aisling Blake	11-8, 11-6, 11-9
2010	No competition		
2009	No competition		
2008	(England) Suzie Pierrepont	(Mexico) Samantha Terán	11-6, 7-11, 11-9, 9-11, 11-4
2007	No competition		
2006	No competition		
2005	No competition		
2004	No competition		
2003	No competition		
2002	No competition		
2001	(Australia) Carol Owens	(England) Stephanie Brind	9-5, 9-5, 9-0
