= Cleveland Classic 2016 =

Cleveland Squash Classic 2016
- 8th Cleveland Classic

Details
- Event name: Cleveland Squash Classic 2016
- Location: Cleveland, Ohio, United States
- Venue: Cleveland Racket Club
- Website www.squashsite.co.uk/2009/cleveland2016.htm

Men's Winner
- Category: International 50
- Prize money: $50,000
- Year: World Tour 2016

The Cleveland Squash Classic 2016 is the women's edition of the 2016 Cleveland Classic, which is a tournament of the PSA World Tour event International (Prize money : $50 000 ). The event took place at the Cleveland Racket Club in Cleveland, Ohio in United States from 30 January to 2 February. Camille Serme won her first Cleveland Classic trophy, beating Alison Waters in the final.

== Prize money and ranking points ==
For 2016, the prize purse was $50,000. The prize money and points breakdown is as follows:

Prize Money Cleveland Classic (2016)
Event	W	F	SF	QF	1R
Points (PSA)	2450	1610	980	595	350
Prize money	$8,550	$5,850	$3,825	$2,365	$1,350

== Seeds ==
1. (France) Camille Serme (champion)
2. (England) Alison Waters (final)
3. (Hong Kong) Annie Au (quarterfinals)
4. (United States) Amanda Sobhy (semifinals)
5. (England) Sarah-Jane Perry (semifinals)
6. (India) Joshna Chinappa (quarterfinals)
7. (Malaysia) Low Wee Wern (first round)
8. (England) Jenny Duncalf (first round)

== Draw and results ==
First round
1	(France) Camille Serme	11	11	11
(Malaysia) Delia Arnold	8	2	4
Q	(England) Georgina Stocker	11	4	8	9
6	(India) Joshna Chinappa	3	11	11	11
5	(England) Sarah-Jane Perry	8	12	3	11	11
Q	(Wales) Tesni Evans	11	10	11	3	7
(Australia) Rachael Grinham	6	6	7
3	(Hong Kong) Annie Au	11	11	11
4	(United States) Amanda Sobhy	9	11	11	12	11
(England) Victoria Lust	11	4	13	10	4
(India) Dipika Pallikal	11	11	8	11
7	(Malaysia) Low Wee Wern	2	9	11	9
8	(England) Jenny Duncalf	11	11	5	9	6
Q	(United States) Olivia Blatchford	5	7	11	11	11
Q	(Mexico) Samantha Terán	3	7	6
2	(England) Alison Waters	11	11	11

Quarter finals
1	(France) Camille Serme	11	5	11	11
6	(India) Joshna Chinappa	4	11	8	2
5	(England) Sarah-Jane Perry	11	11	3	11
3	(Hong Kong) Annie Au	8	4	11	7
4	(United States) Amanda Sobhy	11	11	11
(India) Dipika Pallikal	6	7	8
Q	(United States) Olivia Blatchford	10	3	10
2	(England) Alison Waters	12	11	12

Semi finals
1	(France) Camille Serme	11	12	11
5	(England) Sarah-Jane Perry	7	10	5
4	(United States) Amanda Sobhy	11	9	11	3	10
2	(England) Alison Waters	5	11	9	11	12

Final
1	(France) Camille Serme	7	11	11	11
2	(England) Alison Waters	11	6	9	5

== See also ==
- Cleveland Classic
- 2016 PSA World Tour
