= Men's Macau Open 2016 =

Macau Open 2016
- 11th Men's Macau Open

Details
- Event name: Macau Open 2016
- Location: Macau China
- Website www.squashsite.co.uk/2009/macau2016.htm

Men's Winner
- Category: International 50
- Prize money: $50,000
- Year: World Tour 2016

The Men's Macau Open 2016 is the men's edition of the 2016 Macau Open. It is a tournament of the PSA World Tour event International (prize money: $50,000). The event will take place from 15 September to 18 September in Macau, China.

== Prize money and ranking points ==
For 2016, the prize purse was $50,000. The prize money and points breakdown were as follows:

Prize Money Macau Open (2016)
Event	W	F	SF	QF	1R
Points (PSA)	875	575	350	215	125
Prize money	$ 8,075	$ 5,525	$ 3,615	$ 2,230	$ 1,275

== Seeds ==
1. (Egypt) Marwan El Shorbagy (Semi finals)
2. (India) Saurav Ghosal (Semi finals)
3. (Hong Kong) Max Lee (final)
4. (England) Daryl Selby (Winner)
5. (Hong Kong) Leo Au (first round)
6. (Switzerland) Nicolas Müller (first round)
7. (Malaysia) Mohd Nafiizwan Adnan (quarter finals)
8. (Scotland) Alan Clyne (quarter finals)

== Draw and results ==
First round
1	(Egypt) Marwan El Shorbagy	6	12	11	11
(Australia) Rex Hedrick	11	10	6	7
Q	(England) Joshua Masters	13	3	11	6	3
8	(Scotland) Alan Clyne	11	11	7	11	11
5	(Hong Kong) Leo Au	9	11	7	3
(Malaysia) Ivan Yuen	11	9	11	11
(Hong Kong) Tsz Fung Yip	3	11	9	6
3	(Hong Kong) Max Lee	11	6	11	11
4	(England) Daryl Selby	5	11	11	12
Q	(Wales) Joel Makin	11	5	4	10
WC	(Macau) Steven Liu	6	4	6
7	(Malaysia) Mohd Nafi. Adnan	11	11	11
6	(Switzerland) Nicolas Müller	8	12	11	8
Q	(India) Harinder Pal Sandhu	11	10	13	11
Q	(Malaysia) Elvinn Keo	7	5	7
2	(India) Saurav Ghosal	11	11	11

Quarter finals
1	(Egypt) Marwan El Shorbagy	11	11	7	11
8	(Scotland) Alan Clyne	7	9	11	4
(Malaysia) Ivan Yuen	6	11	5	6
3	(Hong Kong) Max Lee	11	8	11	11
4	(England) Daryl Selby	7	13	11	11
7	(Malaysia) Mohd Nafiizwan Adnan	11	11	7	8
Q	(India) Harinder Pal Sandhu	9	6	11	8
2	(India) Saurav Ghosal	11	11	3	11

Semi finals
1	(Egypt) Marwan El Shorbagy	9	7	11	11	10
3	(Hong Kong) Max Lee	11	11	5	8	12
4	(England) Daryl Selby	8	11	11	11
2	(India) Saurav Ghosal	11	7	4	0

Final
3	(Hong Kong) Max Lee
4	(England) Daryl Selby	w/o

== See also ==
- 2016 PSA World Tour
- Women's Macau Open 2016
- Macau Open (squash)
