= 2010 WISPA World Series =

WISPA World Series 2010

Details
- Event name: WISPA World Series 2010
- Website www.wsaworldtour.com/world-series-standings
- Year: World Tour 2010

The WISPA World Series 2010 is a series of women's squash tournaments which are part of the Women's International Squash Players Association (WISPA) World Tour for the 2010 squash season. The WISPA World Series tournaments are some of the most prestigious events on the women's tour. Nicol David won the 2010 World Series followed by Jenny Duncalf and Rachael Grinham.

== WSA World Series Ranking Points ==
WSA World Series events also have a separate World Series ranking. Points for this are calculated on a cumulative basis after each World Series event.

Tournament			Ranking Points
Rank	Prize Money US$	Ranking Points	Winner	Runner up	3/4	5/8	9/16	17/32
World Series	$74,000+	625 points	100	65	40	25	15	10

== 2010 Tournaments ==
Tournament	Country	Location	Rank	Prize money	Date	2010 Winner
Hong Kong Open 2010	Hong Kong	Hong Kong	World Series Gold	$74,000	25-29 August 2010	(Malaysia) Nicol David
World Open 2010	Egypt	Sharm el-Sheikh	World Open	$147,000	18-22 September 2010	(Malaysia) Nicol David
Qatar Classic 2010	Qatar	Doha	World Series Gold	$74,000	8-12 November 2010	(Malaysia) Nicol David

== World Series Standings 2010 ==
Performance Table Legend
10	1st Round	15	Round of 16
25	Quarterfinalist	40	Semifinalist
65	Runner-up	100	Winner

Top 16 World Series Standings 2010
Rank	Player	Number of Tournament	Hong Kong Open	World Open	Qatar Classic	Total Points
Rank	Player	Number of Tournament	HKG (Hong Kong)	EGY (Egypt)	QAT (Qatar)	Total Points
1	(Malaysia) Nicol David	3	100	100	100	300
2	(England) Jenny Duncalf	3	65	25	40	130
3	(Australia) Rachael Grinham	2	40	-	65	105
4	(Egypt) Omneya Abdel Kawy	3	25	65	10	100
5	(England) Alison Waters	2	40	40	-	80
6	(Australia) Kasey Brown	3	25	25	25	75
7	(France) Camille Serme	3	15	40	15	70
8	(England) Laura Massaro	3	25	15	25	65
9	(Netherlands) Vanessa Atkinson	3	15	25	15	55
10	(Egypt) Nour El Tayeb	2	-	10	40	50
11	(Australia) Donna Urquhart	3	15	10	15	40
12	(France) Isabelle Stoehr	3	10	15	15	40
13	(Republic of Ireland) Madeline Perry	2	25	15	-	40
11	(Egypt) Raneem El Weleily	2	-	15	25	40
15	(England) Sarah Kippax	3	10	10	15	35
16	(New Zealand) Joelle King	2	-	10	25	35

== See also ==
- WISPA World Tour 2010
- Official Women's Squash World Ranking
