= Women's United States Open (squash) 2013 =

US Open 2013
- 14th WSA U.S. Open

Details
- Event name: Delaware Investments United States Open 2013
- Location: (United States) Philadelphia, Pennsylvania
- Venue: Daskalakis Athletic Center
- Website www.usopensquash.com/philadelphia/

Women's Winner
- Category: World Series Platinum
- Prize money: $115,000
- Year: World Tour 2013

The Women's United States Squash Open 2013 is the women's edition of the 2013 United States Open (squash), which is a WSA World Series event Platinum (prize money: $115 000). The event took place at the Daskalakis Athletic Center in Philadelphia, Pennsylvania in the United States from the 13th of October to the 18 October. Nicol David won her second US Open trophy, beating Laura Massaro in the final.

== Prize money and ranking points ==
For 2013, the prize purse was $115,000. The prize money and points breakdown is as follows:

Prize money US Open (2013)
Event	W	F	SF	QF	2R	1R
Points (WSA)	4800	3300	1950	1050	525	300
Prize money	$17,000	$11,500	$6,750	$4,000	$2,250	$1,250

== Seeds ==
1. (Malaysia) Nicol David (champion)
2. (England) Laura Massaro (final)
3. (Egypt) Raneem El Weleily (quarterfinals)
4. (England) Alison Waters (quarterfinals)
5. (New Zealand) Joelle King (semifinals)
6. (Malaysia) Low Wee Wern (semifinals)
7. (England) Jenny Duncalf (second round)
8. (Republic of Ireland) Madeline Perry (quarterfinals)
9. (Australia) Kasey Brown (quarterfinals)
10. (France) Camille Serme (second round)
11. (Egypt) Omneya Abdel Kawy (second round)
12. (Australia) Donna Urquhart (second round)
13. (England) Sarah Kippax (second round)
14. (Egypt) Nour El Tayeb (second round)
15. (Denmark) Line Hansen (second round)
16. (United States) Amanda Sobhy (second round)

== Draw and results ==
1* First round 2*
1	(Malaysia) Nicol David	11	11	11
Q	(New Zealand) Kylie Lindsay	5	3	7
10	(France) Camille Serme	11	11	11
(England) Lauren Briggs	4	8	7
8	(Republic of Ireland) Madeline Perry	11	11	7	9	11
Q	(Wales) Tesni Evans	6	9	11	11	5
15	(Denmark) Line Hansen	8	11	11	11
(England) Emily Whitlock	11	9	8	3
4	(England) Alison Waters	11	11	11
(Republic of Ireland) Aisling Blake	7	6	3
12	(Australia) Donna Urquhart	11	11	11
Q	(United States) Olivia Blatchford	5	8	2
5	(New Zealand) Joelle King	11	11	10	11
Q	(Egypt) Nouran A. Gohar	9	6	12	6
13	(England) Sarah Kippax	11	11	11
(United States) Latasha Khan	7	8	10
(Guyana) Nicolette Fernandes	12	4	1	8
16	(United States) Amanda Sobhy	10	11	11	11
Q	(Australia) Sarah Cardwell	4	4	4
6	(Malaysia) Low Wee Wern	11	11	11
Q	(Egypt) Kanzy El Defrawy	11	6	3	11	6
11	(Egypt) Omneya Abdel Kawy	5	11	11	7	11
(Mexico) Samantha Terán	7	4	5
3	(Egypt) Raneem El Weleily	11	11	11
Q	(Scotland) Lisa Aitken	8	6	6
9	(Australia) Kasey Brown	11	11	11
WC	(United States) Kristen Lange	5	6	4
7	(England) Jenny Duncalf	11	11	11
Q	(United States) Sabrina Sobhy	7	3	2
14	(Egypt) Nour El Tayeb	11	11	11
(England) Victoria Lust	7	3	4
2	(England) Laura Massaro	11	11	11

1* Second round 2*
1	(Malaysia) Nicol David	11	11	11
10	(France) Camille Serme	9	5	4
8	(Republic of Ireland) Madeline Perry	6	11	11	11
15	(Denmark) Line Hansen	11	2	3	8
4	(England) Alison Waters	8	11	11	9	12
12	(Australia) Donna Urquhart	11	5	6	11	10
5	(New Zealand) Joelle King	11	11	11
13	(England) Sarah Kippax	9	4	7
16	(United States) Amanda Sobhy	11	6	9	5
6	(Malaysia) Low Wee Wern	2	11	11	11
11	(Egypt) Omneya Abdel Kawy	7	11	6	11	9
3	(Egypt) Raneem El Weleily	11	5	11	8	11
7	(England) Jenny Duncalf	4	7	10
9	(Australia) Kasey Brown	11	11	12
14	(Egypt) Nour El Tayeb	11	2	9	7
2	(England) Laura Massaro	6	11	11	11

1* Quarter finals 2*
1	(Malaysia) Nicol David	11	11	11
8	(Republic of Ireland) Madeline Perry	6	6	4
4	(England) Alison Waters	10	2	3
5	(New Zealand) Joelle King	11	11	11
6	(Malaysia) Low Wee Wern	7	11	7	11	11
3	(Egypt) Raneem El Weleily	11	8	11	9	8
9	(Australia) Kasey Brown	12	4	8	5
2	(England) Laura Massaro	10	11	11	11

Semi finals *
1	(Malaysia) Nicol David	14	11	11
5	(New Zealand) Joelle King	12	4	6
Final
1	(Malaysia) Nicol David *	13	11	7	11	11
2	(England) Laura Massaro	11	13	11	8	5
6	(Malaysia) Low Wee Wern	6	11	6	11	7
2	(England) Laura Massaro	11	9	11	9	11

== See also ==
- United States Open (squash)
- WSA World Series 2013
- Men's United States Open (squash) 2013

Preceded by Malaysian Open; Malaysia (Kuala Lumpur); 2013	WSA World Series 2013; US Open; United States (Philadelphia); 2013	Succeeded by Hong Kong Open; Hong Kong; 2013
