= Men's Macau Open 2015 =

Macau Open 2015
- 10th Men's Macau Open

Details
- Event name: Macau Open 2015
- Location: Macau China
- Website www.squashsite.co.uk/2009/macau2015.htm

Men's Winner
- Category: International 50
- Prize money: $50,000
- Year: World Tour 2015

The Men's Macau Open 2015 is the men's edition of the 2015 Macau Open, which is a tournament of the PSA World Tour event International (Prize money: $50,000). The event took place in Macau in China from 17 September to 20 September. Max Lee won his first Macau Open trophy, beating Fares Dessouky in the final.

== Prize money and ranking points ==
For 2015, the prize purse was $ 50,000. The prize money and points breakdown was as follows:

Prize Money Macau Open (2015)
Event	W	F	SF	QF	1R
Points (PSA)	875	575	350	215	125
Prize money	$ 8,075	$ 5,525	$ 3,615	$ 2,230	$ 1,275

== Seeds ==
1. (Egypt) Omar Mosaad (Quarterfinals)
2. (Egypt) Tarek Momen (Semifinals)
3. (Spain) Borja Golán (Quarterfinals)
4. (Egypt) Marwan El Shorbagy (Quarterfinals)
5. (Hong Kong) Max Lee (Champion)
6. (Egypt) Fares Dessouky (Final)
7. (Egypt) Omar Abdel Meguid (Quarterfinals)
8. (Malaysia) Mohd Nafiizwan Adnan (Semifinals)

== Draw and results ==
First round
1	(Egypt) Omar Mosaad	11	6	11	11
Q	(Egypt) Karim Ali Fathi	7	11	7	4
(Hong Kong) Leo Au	10	11	9	7
8	(Malaysia) Mohd Nafi. Adnan	12	8	11	11
6	(Egypt) Fares Dessouky	11	11	11
(Finland) Olli Tuominen	9	9	1
Q	(Scotland) Greg Lobban	9	11	10	4
3	(Spain) Borja Golán	11	9	12	11
4	(Egypt) Marwan El Shorbagy	11	11	11
WC	(Macau) Steven Liu	3	4	6
Q	(Pakistan) Nasir Iqbal	5	11	11	10	5
5	(Hong Kong) Max Lee	11	6	7	12	11
7	(Egypt) Omar Abdel Meguid	11	11
(South Africa) Shaun Le Roux	6	2	rtd
Q	(Australia) Rex Hedrick	6	11	6	8
2	(Egypt) Tarek Momen	11	8	11	11

Quarter finals
1	(Egypt) Omar Mosaad	11	4	8	11	7
8	(Malaysia) Mohd Nafi. Adnan	7	11	11	6	11
6	(Egypt) Fares Dessouky	9	4	11	11	11
3	(Spain) Borja Golán	11	11	4	8	7
4	(Egypt) Marwan El Shorbagy	10	13	2
5	(Hong Kong) Max Lee	12	15	11
7	(Egypt) Omar Abdel Meguid	4	11	5	6
2	(Egypt) Tarek Momen	11	3	11	11

Semi finals
8	(Malaysia) Mohd Nafi. Adnan	5	3	3
6	(Egypt) Fares Dessouky	11	11	11
5	(Hong Kong) Max Lee	13	11	11
2	(Egypt) Tarek Momen	11	5	4

Final
6	(Egypt) Fares Dessouky	9	6	0
5	(Hong Kong) Max Lee	11	11	11

== See also ==
- 2015 PSA World Tour
- Women's Macau Open 2015
- Macau Open (squash)
