= Cleveland Classic 2013 =

Cleveland Squash Classic 2013
- 5th Cleveland Classic

Details
- Event name: Cleveland Squash Classic 2013
- Location: Cleveland, Ohio, United States
- Venue: Cleveland Racket Club
- Website www.squashsite.co.uk/2009/clevelandclassic2013.htm

Women's Winner
- Category: Gold 50
- Prize money: $50,000
- Year: World Tour 2013

The Cleveland Squash Classic 2013 is the women's edition of the 2013 Cleveland Classic, which is a tournament of the WSA World Tour event International (Prize money : 50 000 $). The event took place at the Cleveland Racket Club in Cleveland, Ohio in United States from 2 February to 5 February. Raneem El Weleily won her first Cleveland Classic trophy, beating Nicol David in the final.

== Prize money and ranking points ==
For 2013, the prize purse was $50,000. The prize money and points breakdown is as follows:

Prize Money Cleveland Classic (2013)
Event	W	F	SF	QF	1R
Points (WSA)	2450	1610	980	595	350
Prize money	$8,550	$5,850	$3,825	$2,365	$1,350

== Seeds ==
1. (Malaysia) Nicol David (Final)
2. (Egypt) Raneem El Weleily (Champion)
3. (England) Alison Waters (Semifinals)
4. (New Zealand) Joelle King (Quarterfinals)
5. (Egypt) Nour El Sherbini (Quarterfinals)
6. (Malaysia) Low Wee Wern (Quarterfinals)
7. (Hong Kong) Annie Au (Quarterfinals)
8. (Republic of Ireland) Madeline Perry (Semifinals)

== Draw and results ==
First round
1	(Malaysia) Nicol David	11	11	11
(England) Jenny Duncalf	3	4	9
6	(Malaysia) Low Wee Wern	11	11	11
Q	(Australia) Rachael Grinham	4	4	6
4	(New Zealand) Joelle King	11	11	11
WC	(United States) Amanda Sobhy	7	7	2
8	(Republic of Ireland) Madeline Perry	11	11	11
(Australia) Donna Urquhart	2	7	3
(Australia) Kasey Brown	6	11	6	9
5	(Egypt) Nour El Sherbini	11	8	11	11
Q	(India) Joshna Chinappa	9	11	4	7
3	(England) Alison Waters	11	6	11	11
Q	(Egypt) Omneya Abdel Kawy	5	4	8
7	(Hong Kong) Annie Au	11	11	11
Q	(England) Sarah Kippax	11	12	5	6
2	(Egypt) Raneem El Weleily	13	10	11	11

Quarter finals
1	(Malaysia) Nicol David	12	11	11
6	(Malaysia) Low Wee Wern	10	6	9
4	(New Zealand) Joelle King	11	7	11	3	5
8	(Republic of Ireland) Madeline Perry	3	11	7	11	11
5	(Egypt) Nour El Sherbini	9	2	7
3	(England) Alison Waters	11	11	11
7	(Hong Kong) Annie Au	3	6	10
2	(Egypt) Raneem El Weleily	11	11	12

Semi finals
1	(Malaysia) Nicol David	11	11	4	11
8	(Republic of Ireland) Madeline Perry	6	7	11	7
3	(England) Alison Waters	9	9	5
2	(Egypt) Raneem El Weleily	11	11	11

Final
1	(Malaysia) Nicol David	11	5	11	5	9
2	(Egypt) Raneem El Weleily	3	11	9	11	11

== See also ==
- Cleveland Classic
- WSA World Tour 2013
