= Singapore Women's Masters =

Details
- Event name: Singapore Women's Masters
- Location: Singapore
- Venue: Kallang Squash Center

Women's Winner
- Category: Gold 50
- Prize money: $53,500
- Most recent champion(s): (Republic of Ireland) Madeline Perry

The Singapore Women's Masters is an annual women's squash tournament that takes place in Singapore in July. It is part of the WSA World Tour.

== Past Results ==
=== Women's ===
Year	Champion	Runner-up	Score in final	Ref
2007	(Malaysia) Nicol David	(Netherlands) Natalie Grinham	9-6, 9-5, 9-5	
2008	(Malaysia) Nicol David	(Australia) Rachael Grinham	8-11, 11-3, 11-5, 11-8	
2009	(Malaysia) Nicol David	(Netherlands) Natalie Grinham	11-9, 11-8, 11-9	
2010	(Malaysia) Nicol David	(England) Alison Waters	18-16, 11-9, 12-10	
2011	(Republic of Ireland) Madeline Perry	(England) Laura Massaro	11-7, 11-8, 5-11, 11-9	
2012	No competition			

== See also ==
- WSA World Tour
