= Tenille Swartz =

South African squash player (born 1987)

Personal information
- Born: 13 May 1987 (age 39) Parys, South Africa

Sport
- Country: South Africa
- Turned pro: 2006
- Coached by: Richard Castle
- Retired: 2011
- Racquet used: Prince

Women's singles
- Highest ranking: No. 28 (April 2008)
- Updated on July 2018

Tenille Swartz (born 13 May 1987 in Parys), now known as Tenille van der Merwe, is a South African professional squash player. She reached a career-high PSA ranking of World No. 28 in April 2008.

== See also ==
- Official Women's Squash World Ranking
- WISPA Awards

Awards and achievements
Preceded by Raneem El Weleily	WISPA Young Player of the Year; 2006	Succeeded by Camille Serme
