= Oriol Salvia =

Spanish squash player (born 1975)

Oriol Salvia
Country:	Spain
Residence:	Barcelona
Height:	1.72m
Weight:
Plays:
Racquet:	Dunlop Ice Tour
Turned pro:	1995
Highest World Ranking:	83 (January 2002)
Current World Ranking:
PSA Tour Titles:	1
PSA Tour Finals:	2

Oriol Salvia (born 29 March 1975 in Barcelona) is a professional squash player from Spain.

== PSA Tour Titles ==
Year	Championship	Opponent in Final	Score in Final
2008	Open International d'Squash Espotiu Rocafort	(New Zealand) Martin Knight	11-8, 11-2, 11-2

== PSA Tour Finals (Runner-Up) ==
Year	Championship	Opponent in Final	Score in Final
1997	Macau Squash Open
