= Cleveland Classic =

Squash in the Land

Details
- Event name: Squash in the Land
- Location: Cleveland, Ohio, United States

Women's Winner
- Category: World Tour Silver
- Prize money: $96,250
- Most recent champion(s): (United States) Olivia Weaver
- Current: Squash in the Land 2026

The Squash in the Land is an annual women's squash tournament that takes place in Cleveland, Ohio, United States in January. It is part of the PSA World Tour.

The event was named "Cleveland Squash Classic" from 2011 to 2023. The event was named "Burning River Squash Classic" from 2007 to 2010.

== Past Results ==
=== Women's ===
Year	Champion	Runner-up	Score in final
2026	(United States) Olivia Weaver	(United States) Sabrina Sobhy	11-5, 11-2, 11-2
2025	(Japan) Satomi Watanabe	(United States) Amanda Sobhy	11-8, 11-8, 11-6
2024	(Egypt) Nour El Tayeb	(England) Georgina Kennedy	9-11, 11-6, 11-6, 11-5
2023	(England) Georgina Kennedy	(United States) Olivia Clyne	13-11, 11-8, 7-11, 11-6
2022	(England) Georgina Kennedy	(England) Sarah-Jane Perry	11-7, 6-11, 11-2, 11-6
2021	not played		
2020	(Egypt) Nour El Tayeb	(England) Sarah-Jane Perry	10-12, 14-12, 11-5, 11-4
2019	(Egypt) Nour El Tayeb	(Wales) Tesni Evans	11-5, 11-7, 9-11, 11-9
2018	(New Zealand) Joelle King	(Egypt) Raneem El Weleily	11-8, 11-8, 11-8
2017	(France) Camille Serme	(England) Alison Waters	10-12, 9-11, 11-7, 11-8, 11-7
2016	(France) Camille Serme	(England) Alison Waters	7-11, 11-6, 11-9, 11-5
2015	(Malaysia) Nicol David	(Egypt) Raneem El Weleily	11-5, 11-9, 11-4
2014	(Malaysia) Nicol David	(Hong Kong) Annie Au	13-11, 11-5, 11-6
2013	(Egypt) Raneem El Weleily	(Malaysia) Nicol David	3-11, 11-5, 9-11, 11-5, 11-9
2012	(Malaysia) Nicol David	(England) Laura Massaro	7-11, 12-10, 11-7, 11-8
2011	(England) Laura Massaro	(Malaysia) Nicol David	11-9, 11-7, 9-11, 11-8
2010	(England) Alison Waters	(Egypt) Omneya Abdel Kawy	11-7, 11-9, 7-11, 3-11, 11-6
2009	(United States) Natalie Grainger	(England) Alison Waters	9-11, 11-1, 11-6, 11-4
2008	(United States) Natalie Grainger	(Australia) Kasey Brown	9-1, 9-4, 9-0
2007	(United States) Natalie Grainger	(France) Isabelle Stoehr	9-7, 10-8, 9-1

=== Women's champions by country ===
Champions		Runner-up	
United States	4	England	7
Egypt	4	United States	3
England	4	Egypt	3
Malaysia	3	Malaysia	2
France	2	Wales	1
Japan	1	Hong Kong	1
New Zealand	1	France	1
Australia	0	Australia	1

== See also ==
- WSA World Tour
