= Manuela Manetta =

Italian squash player (born 1983)

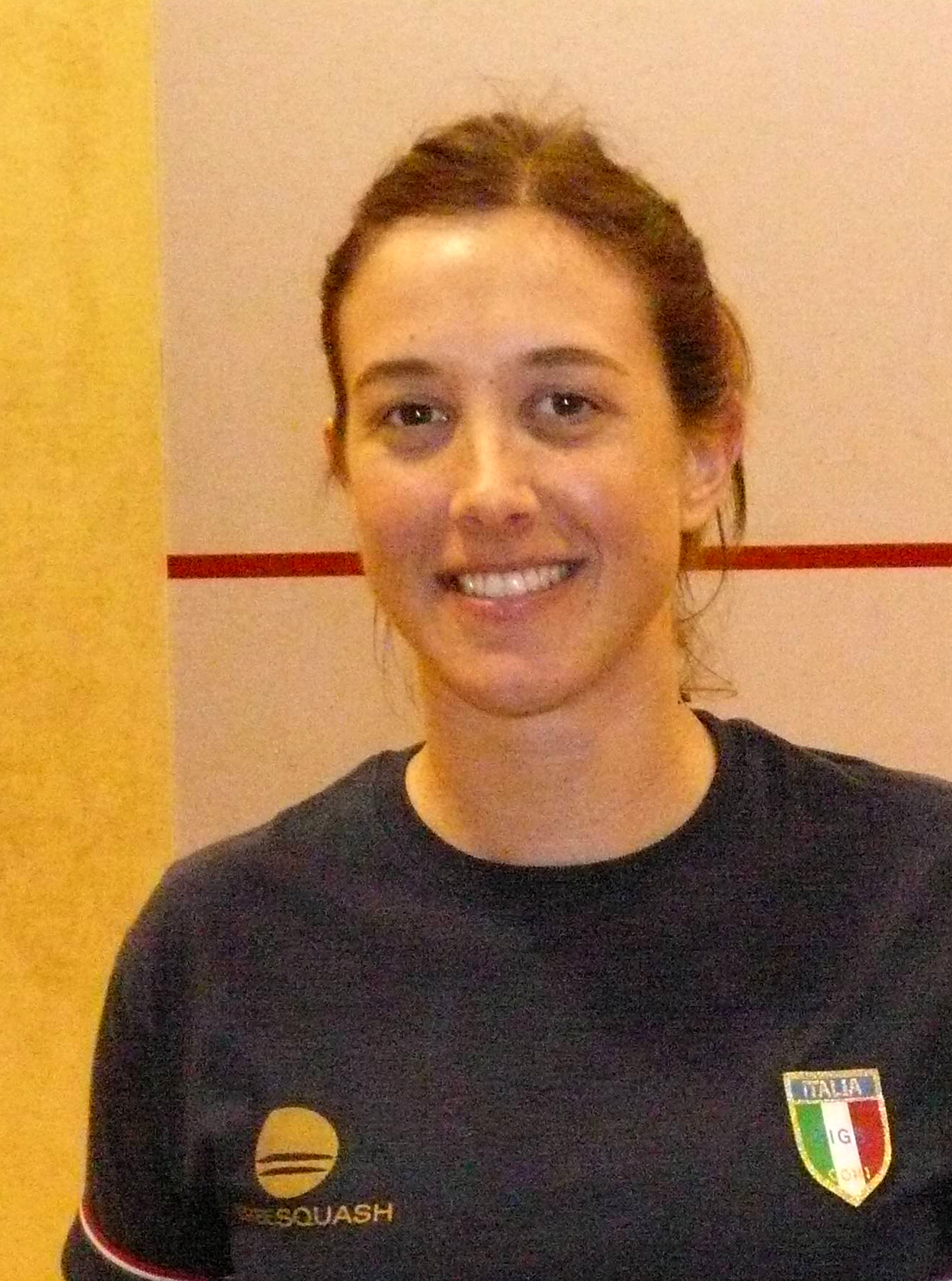
- During Open Città d'Italia - Terni 2011

Personal information
- Born: 6 June 1983 (age 43) Parma, Italy
- Height: 1.74 m (5 ft 9 in)
- Weight: 62 kg (137 lb)

Sport
- Country: Italy
- Handedness: Right Handed
- Turned pro: 2002
- Coached by: Marcus Berrett
- Retired: 2014
- Racquet used: Head

Women's singles
- Highest ranking: No. 25 (December 2007)
- Current ranking: No. 32 (July 2011)
- Updated on July 2011

Manuela Manetta (born 6 June 1983 in Parma) is a professional squash player who represented Italy. She reached a career-high world ranking of World No. 25 in December 2007.
