= Siyoli Waters =

South Africa squash player (born 1983)

Personal information
- Born: 31 January 1983 (age 43) East London, South Africa

Sport
- Country: South Africa
- Handedness: Right Handed
- Turned pro: 2009
- Coached by: Wael El Batran
- Retired: Active
- Racquet used: Dunlop

Women's singles
- Highest ranking: No. 28 (October, 2013)
- Current ranking: No. 33 (January, 2016)
- Title: 2
- Tour final: 5
- Updated on January, 2016

Siyoli Waters (born 31 January 1983) is a South African professional squash player.

Waters was born in East London, Eastern Cape. She joined the Professional Squash Association in 2009 and reached a career-high ranking of World No. 28 in October 2013.
