= Darren Long =

British real tennis player

- Full name: Darren Long
- Country (sports): United Kingdom
- Residence: United Kingdom
- Born: 26 September 1988 (age 37)
- Plays: Right-handed
- Club: Moreton Morrell Tennis Court Club

Singles
- Career titles: 0
- Highest ranking: 10
- Current ranking: 14

Grand Slam singles results
- Australian Open: QF (2020, 2024)
- British Open: QF (2021)
- French Open: QF (2023, 2024)
- US Open: QF (2018, 2019, 2020)

Doubles
- Career titles: 0
- Highest ranking: 13
- Current ranking: 12

Grand Slam doubles results
- Australian Open: SF (2024)
- French Open: QF (2016, 2017, 2018, 2019, 2022, 2023)
- British Open: QF (2015, 2016, 2019, 2022, 2023)
- US Open: SF (2018, 2024)

Darren Long (born 26 September 1988) is a British professional real tennis player, currently the head professional at the Moreton Morrell Tennis Court Club. He is currently ranked thirteenth in the world at singles and twelfth in the world at doubles. He has reached an Open doubles semi final on three occasions, most recently at the 2024 US Open and the 2024 Australian Open.

== Career ==
Long grew up as a squash player and took a job as a squash coach at Canford School. There, he learned real tennis under the head professional Steve Ronaldson. Long improved quickly – after picking up the game in 2009, he won the Category B Open at Hyde Real Tennis Club in 2010. Later that year, he won the Taylor Cup – a tournament for new professionals – in Manchester, beating John Lumley in the final. Long started competing in the Opens in 2011, losing in the first round of the US Open, and failing to progress from qualifying in the French and British Opens. Long would reach the British Open main draw for the first time in 2012, and recorded his first Open match victory against Andrew Lyons in 2014.

Long's playing career began in earnest when he moved to become the senior professional at the Manchester Tennis and Racquet Club in 2015. He began to play regular international tournaments, winning the IRTPA Satellite in 2015 against Claire Fahey. He also won the Category A Open in 2016, beating Peter Wright, who had beat him in the final the year before. Also in 2016, Long won the US Professional Singles Satellite, beating Leon Smart.

In 2017, Long made his main draw debuts at the Australian and French Opens. He beat Zak Eadle at the French Open in five sets to reach his first singles quarter final, where he subsequently lost to World Champion Camden Riviere. He also played in the first round of the 2017 World Doubles Championship at Prested Hall, partnered with Craig Greenhalgh, but lost in the first round to eventual champions Riviere and Tim Chisholm. He continued to collect minor tournament victories, including the Category A Open in 2017 and 2018.

The 2018 US Open would be Long's best tournament of his career thus far. He reached the quarter finals of the singles for the first time, comfortably beating Josh Dodgson in the first round. He partnered with Ben Taylor-Matthews in the doubles, beating Dodgson and Matthieu Sarlangue in the quarter finals in five sets, the last set ending 6/5. In his first Open doubles semi final, they lost to Robert Fahey and Nick Howell, winning just two games in the match. At the end of the season, Long broke into the world top 10 for the first time.

In 2019, Long again competed in the World Doubles Championships in Hobart. Partnered with Andrew Fowler, they lost in the first round to eventual champions Riviere and Chisholm again. He would later beat Fowler in the 2020 Australian Open to reach his first quarter final in that event.

Returning to play after the COVID-19 pandemic, Long's next accomplishment came at the 2022 Champions Trophy, where he reached the quarter final stage for the first time after a five set victory over Levi Gale. The remainder of the 2022 and 2023 seasons were a disappointment for Long, his only match victory coming in the first round of the 2023 British Open against lucky loser from qualifying Mark Hobbs, coming out of a ten year retirement.

2024 would be more successful for Long on the doubles court, reaching the semi finals of the Australian Open for the first time alongside Ben Taylor-Matthews. A few months later he also reached the semi finals of the US Open with Robert Shenkman, upsetting the favoured seeds Taylor-Matthews and Bryn Sayers in the quarter finals in five sets. He would once again run into Riviere and Chisholm in the semi finals, losing in straight sets. Halfway through the season, Long moved to the Moreton Morrell Tennis Court Club, becoming the head professional.

== Performance timeline ==
=== Singles ===
Key
W	F	SF	QF	#R	RR	Q#	DNQ	A	NH

(W) winner; (F) finalist; (SF) semifinalist; (QF) quarterfinalist; (#R) rounds 4, 3, 2, 1; (RR) round-robin stage; (Q#) qualification round; (DNQ) did not qualify; (A) absent; (NH) not held; (SR) strike rate (events won / competed); (W–L) win–loss record.
To avoid confusion and double counting, these charts are updated at the conclusion of a tournament or when the player's participation has ended.

Current through the 2025 Champions Trophy

Tournament	2010	2011	2012	2013	2014	2015	2016	2017	2018	2019	2020	2021	2022	2023	2024	2025	SR	W–L	Win %
World Championship
Win–loss	0–0	0–0	0–0	0–0	0–0	0–0	0–0	0–0	0–0	0–0	0–0	0–0	0–0	0–0	0–0	0–0	0 / 0	0–0	–
Grand Slam tournaments
Australian Open	A	A	A	A	A	A	A	1R	A	1R	QF	NH	A	A	QF	A	0 / 4	2–4	33%
British Open	A	Q3	1R	A	2R	2R	1R	2R	2R	2R	NH	QF	2R	2R	2R		0 / 11	9–11	45%
French Open	A	Q1	A	A	A	A	A	QF	1R	1R	NH		1R	1R	A		0 / 5	1–5	17%
US Open	A	1R	A	A	A	1R	A	2R	QF	QF	QF	A	2R	2R	2R	2R	0 / 10	4–11	27%
Win–loss	0–0	0–1	0–1	0–0	1–1	1–2	0–1	3–4	2–3	2–5	2–2	1–1	1–3	1–3	2–3	0–1	0 / 30	16–31	34%
IRTPA Sanctioned Tournaments
Champions Trophy	NH							1R	RR	1R	NH		QF	RR	RR	1R	0 / 4	4–4	50%
European Open	NH	A	A	QF	NH	QF	NH									NH	0 / 2	0–2	0%
IRTPA Championship	1R	1R	1R	QF	1R	1R	NH	1R	QF	QF	NH						0 / 9	3–9	25%
US Pro	A	A	A	1R	A	A	1R	1R	QF	1R	NH	A	A	A	1R	1R	0 / 7	1–7	13%
Win–loss	0–1	0–1	0–1	1–3	0–1	0–2	0–1	0–3	2–2	1–3	0–0	0–0	1–1	0–0	0–1	3–2	0 / 22	8–22	27%
Career Statistics
	2010	2011	2012	2013	2014	2015	2016	2017	2018	2019	2020	2021	2022	2023	2024	2025	Career		
Tournaments	1	2	2	3	2	4	2	7	5	7	2	1	4	3	4	3	Career total: 52		
Titles	0	0	0	0	0	0	0	0	0	0	0	0	0	0	0	0	Career total: 0		
Finals	0	0	0	0	0	0	0	0	0	0	0	0	0	0	0	0	Career total: 0		
Overall win–loss	0–1	0–2	0–2	1–3	1–2	1–4	0–2	3–7	4–5	3–8	2–2	1–1	2–4	1–3	2–4	3–3	24–53		31%
Win %	0%	0%	0%	25%	33%	20%	0%	30%	44%	27%	50%	50%	33%	25%	33%	50%	Career total: 31%		

=== Doubles ===
Tournament	2011	2012	2013	2014	2015	2016	2017	2018	2019	2020	2021	2022	2023	2024	2025	SR	W–L	Win %
World Championship
World Championship	DNQ	NH	DNQ	NH	DNQ	NH	QF	NH	QF	NH		DNQ	NH	DNQ		0 / 2	0–2	0%
Win–loss	0–0	0–0	0–0	0–0	0–0	0–0	0–1	0–0	0–1	0–0	0–0	0–0	0–0	0–0	0–0	0 / 2	0–2	0%
Grand Slam tournaments
Australian Open	A	A	A	A	A	A	QF	A	QF	QF	NH	A	A	SF	A	0 / 4	1–4	20%
British Open	Q1	Q1	A	Q2	QF	QF	1R	1R	QF	NH	1R	QF	QF	1R		0 / 9	3–10	23%
French Open	A	A	NH	A	A	QF	QF	QF	QF	NH		QF	QF	A		0 / 6	0–6	0%
US Open	1R	A	A	A	1R	A	1R	SF	QF	QF	A	QF	QF	SF	QF	0 / 10	5–10	33%
Win–loss	0–1	0–0	0–0	0–0	0–3	1–2	0–4	1–3	1–4	0–2	0–1	2–3	0–3	3–3	1–1	0 / 29	9–30	23%
IRTPA Sanctioned Tournaments
IRTPA Championship	NH					SF	SF	SF	NH							0 / 3	4–2	67%
Win–loss	0–0	0–0	0–0	0–0	0–0	1–1	2–0	1–1	0–0	0–0	0–0	0–0	0–0	0–0	0–0	0 / 3	4–2	67%
Career Statistics
	2011	2012	2013	2014	2015	2016	2017	2018	2019	2020	2021	2022	2023	2024	2025	Career		
Tournaments	1	0	0	0	2	3	6	4	5	2	1	3	3	3	1	Career total: 34		
Titles	0	0	0	0	0	0	0	0	0	0	0	0	0	0	0	Career total: 0		
Finals	0	0	0	0	0	0	0	0	0	0	0	0	0	0	0	Career total: 0		
Overall win–loss	0–1	0–0	0–0	0–0	0–3	2–3	2–5	2–4	1–5	0–2	0–1	2–3	0–3	3–3	1–1	13–34		28%
Win %	0%	–	–	–	0%	40%	29%	33%	17%	0%	0%	40%	0%	50%	50%	Career total: 28%		
