= Chris Chapman (real tennis) =

Australian real tennis player

- Full name: Chris Chapman
- Country (sports): Australia
- Residence: Australia
- Born: 23 April 1985 (age 41)
- Plays: Right-handed
- Club: Royal Melbourne Tennis Club

World Championships
- Open Singles: Final Eliminator (2020); First Round Eliminator (2018, 2020)
- Open Doubles: SF (2011, 2017, 2019)

Singles
- Career titles: 3
- Current ranking: 10

Grand Slam singles results
- Australian Open: W (2020, 2023)
- British Open: F (2016, 2018)
- French Open: W (2018)
- US Open: SF (2019)

Doubles
- Career titles: 4
- Current ranking: 10

Grand Slam doubles results
- Australian Open: W (2016, 2020, 2023, 2025)
- French Open: F (2017, 2018)
- British Open: W (2015)
- US Open: F (2016, 2017)

Chris Chapman (born 23 April 1985) is an Australian professional real tennis player formerly ranked world number 3 and currently based at the Royal Melbourne Tennis Club. Chapman challenged for the Real Tennis World Championship on 3 occasions, reaching the Final Eliminator in 2020. Over his career, he won 3 Open singles titles, 2 at the Australian Open and 1 at the French Open. He also holds 5 Open doubles titles. In 2023 during the British Open, he announced his retirement from international competitions, although he still competes in Australian competitions, notably winning the 2025 Australian Open Doubles.

== Career ==
Chapman began his career as a squash player, playing in the Victorian Open Championships in 2004. In 2007, he began playing real tennis as a professional at the Royal Melbourne Tennis Club. After just five months playing the sport, he competed at his first Australian Open in January 2008, winning his first competitive match against Patrick Winthrop in 5 sets, but losing in the quarterfinal to World Champion Robert Fahey. Over the next two years, Chapman developed his game on the Australian circuit, reaching the finals of the Victorian and Tasmanian Opens. Chapman competed in his first British Open in 2009, losing his first round match to Paul Knox.

In 2010, Chapman moved to the Royal Tennis Court at Hampton Court Palace to further his playing career. He reached the final of the 2010 IRTPA Satellite, losing to Rod McNaughtan. By the end of 2010, Chapman had reached a scratch handicap. He reached his first Open semi final at the 2011 Australian Open against Steve Virgona. Chapman competed with Ruaraidh Gunn at the 2011 World Doubles Championship in Melbourne, winning through the quarterfinal in straight sets but losing to Ben Taylor-Matthews and Julian Snow in the semi-final. The remainder of the 2011 season saw him winning the Category A Open against Matthew Ronaldson in Oxford and the US Pro Satellite against Richard Smith, while making his debut at the French and US Opens.

In 2012 and 2013, Chapman saw the most success on the doubles court regularly reaching 6 Open semifinals, three of them partnering with Ben Taylor-Matthews. In 2013, Chapman reached the final of the Middlesex University British Challenge against Ricardo Smith, a competition devised to give more players experience at the best of 13 set format. However, 2013 did not end well for Chapman, retiring at the British Open doubles semi final after just 3 games.

Chapman returned to competition and the 2014 French Open, playing a very tight first round match against Robert Fahey. 2015 was a breakout year for Chapman, reaching his first Open final at the Australian Open after a close semi final against Kieran Booth. His form continued into the latter half of the season, reaching the final of the European Open at Lord's Cricket Ground against Fahey in October, followed by his first Doubles Open title at the British Open with Steve Virgona, beating Bryn Sayers and Ricardo Smith in the final 3 sets to 1. Two months later, Chapman won the 2016 Australian Open with Robert Fahey. He and Virgona reached the final of the 2016 US Open, losing to world champions Tim Chisholm and Camden Riviere. At the end of the year, Chapman played his first British Open final, also against Riviere but losing in straight sets, a tournament which included his first victory over Robert Fahey during the quarterfinal and his first victory over Steve Virgona in the semifinal.

With another final at the IRTPA Championships in 2017, Chapman had accrued enough world race points to qualify for the 2018 World Championship Eliminators. Chapman was the third seed of the eliminators; in the first round he drew second seed Steve Virgona. Chapman won the bid to host the eliminator at his home club of the Royal Tennis Court. In the best of 9 set match, Virgona won the first four sets on the first day, and thus opted to play the fifth set that same day, which he also won.

2018 would go on to be the best of Chapman's career. Chapman won the 2018 French Open against Ben Taylor-Matthews in straight sets, after a five set semi final against Virgona. Chapman would also reach the final of the Australian and British Opens, the US Professional Singles at Newport and the second edition of the Champions Trophy, reaching a career high ranking of world number 3. He was also a finalist at three of the four doubles Opens that year. At the end of the 2019 season, Chapman would leave the Royal Tennis Court, moving back to the Royal Melbourne Tennis Club.

Chapman's performance in the 2018-19 World Race would again qualify him for the World Championship Eliminators in 2020. In the First Round Eliminator, he drew Ben Taylor-Matthews, winning the bid to host the event in Melbourne. Ahead of the event, he lost the final of the Governor's Cup in Hobart to John Lumley, before beating him in the Australian Open semi final in Melbourne. Chapman would go on to win his first Australian Open singles title against Kieran Booth, and his second Australian Open doubles title with Nick Howell. At the Eliminator, the best of 9 set match was tied after the first day, with both players exchanging sets through the day. On the second day, the players would exchange sets a third time, before Chapman finally won two consecutive sets to win 5 games to 3. Chapman then progressed to the Final Eliminator against former World Champion Camden Riviere, who had lost his title at the 2018 World Championship. Riviere won the bid for hosting rights, with the match being held at the Tennis and Racquet Club in Boston in a best of 13 set format. Riviere won all four sets on the first day, and three of four sets on the second day, meaning the third day of the match would not be required. Riviere would go on to win the overall title in 2022, delayed due to the COVID-19 pandemic. The pandemic also prevented Chapman from playing any further competitive tennis in 2020 and 2021, only playing in the travel restricted Melbourne Open in January 2021 in lieu of the regular Australian Open.

Chapman returned to competition at the 2022 US Open, where he lost the quarterfinal to Leon Smart. Through reaching the final of the 2022 French Open against Riviere, he again had enough World Race points to enter the 2023 World Championship Eliminators. As fourth seed, Chapman drew John Lumley in the First Round Eliminator. Lumley won the bid to host the event at the Racquet Club of Philadelphia. Lumley won the first three sets of the best-of-9-set match, with Chapman closing out the first day with a close 6/5 set. On the second day, Lumley won two of three sets to progress to the Final Eliminator.

In 2023, Chapman won the Australian Open singles for the second time, coming back from a two-set deficit to defeat Nick Howell in five sets. In the doubles, he partnered Howell to win his third Australian Open doubles title against Kieran Booth and Levi Gale. Chapman played his last international tournament at the 2023 US Professional Singles, where he lost in the first round to Robert Shenkman in five sets. During the 2023 British Open (where he was absent), he announced his retirement from international competitions via social media. He has continued to play Australian tournaments, most notably the 2025 Australian Open where he partnered with Camden Riviere to beat Ben Taylor-Matthews and Robert Fahey in the final in five sets.

== Performance timeline ==
=== Singles ===
Key
W	F	SF	QF	#R	RR	Q#	DNQ	A	NH

(W) winner; (F) finalist; (SF) semifinalist; (QF) quarterfinalist; (#R) rounds 4, 3, 2, 1; (RR) round-robin stage; (Q#) qualification round; (DNQ) did not qualify; (A) absent; (NH) not held; (SR) strike rate (events won / competed); (W–L) win–loss record.
To avoid confusion and double counting, these charts are updated at the conclusion of a tournament or when the player's participation has ended.

Current through the 2025 Australian Open

Tournament	2008	2009	2010	2011	2012	2013	2014	2015	2016	2017	2018	2019	2020	2021	2022	2023	2024	2025	SR	W–L	Win %
World Championship
World Championship	DNQ	NH	DNQ	NH	DNQ	NH	DNQ	NH	DNQ	NH	1R	NH			2R	1R	NH	DNQ	0 / 3	1–3	25%
Win–loss	0–0	0–0	0–0	0–0	0–0	0–0	0–0	0–0	0–0	0–0	0–1	0–0	0–0	0–0	1–1	0–1	0–0	0–0	0 / 3	1–3	25%
Grand Slam tournaments
Australian Open	QF	1R	QF	QF	QF	QF	A	F	SF	QF	F	QF	W	NH	A	W	QF	QF	2 / 15	22–13	63%
British Open	A	1R	QF	2R	QF	QF	QF	QF	F	SF	F	SF	NH	A	QF	A	A		0 / 12	20–12	63%
French Open	A	A	1R	1R	1R	1R	1R	QF	QF	SF	W	QF	NH		F	A	A		1 / 11	12–10	55%
US Open	A	A	A	QF	QF	QF	A	QF	QF	2R	A	SF	A	A	QF	A	A	A	0 / 8	10–8	56%
Win–loss	1–1	0–2	3–3	4–4	4–4	2–4	2–2	5–4	7–4	5–4	10–2	7–4	3–0	0–0	5–3	4–0	1–1	1–1	3 / 46	64–43	60%
IRTPA Sanctioned Tournaments
Champions Trophy	NH									SF	F	QF	NH		SF	A	A		0 / 4	4–6	40%
European Open	A	A	NH	1R	QF	SF	NH	F	NH										0 / 4	3–4	43%
IRTPA Championship	NH	QF	1R	QF	SF	SF	SF	SF	NH	F	SF	A	NH						0 / 9	14–9	61%
US Pro	A	A	A	QF	A	A	A	QF	SF	SF	F	QF	NH	A	QF	2R	A		0 / 8	11–7	61%
Win–loss	0–0	1–1	0–1	2–3	2–2	3–2	2–1	5–2	1–1	5–3	7–4	2–2	0–0	0–0	2–3	0–1	0–0	0–0	0 / 25	32–26	55%
Career Statistics
	2008	2009	2010	2011	2012	2013	2014	2015	2016	2017	2018	2019	2020	2021	2022	2023	2024	2025	Career		
Tournaments	1	3	4	7	6	6	3	7	5	7	7	6	1	0	6	3	1	1	Career total: 74		
Titles	0	0	0	0	0	0	0	0	0	0	1	0	1	0	0	1	0	0	Career total: 3		
Finals	0	0	0	0	0	0	0	2	1	1	5	0	1	0	1	1	0	0	Career total: 12		
Overall win–loss	1–1	1–3	3–4	6–7	6–6	5–6	4–3	10–6	8–5	10–7	17–7	9–6	3–0	0–0	8–7	4–2	1–1	1–1	97–72		57%
Win %	50%	25%	43%	46%	50%	45%	57%	63%	62%	59%	71%	60%	100%	–	53%	67%	50%	50%	Career total: 57%		

=== Doubles ===
Tournament	2008	2009	2010	2011	2012	2013	2014	2015	2016	2017	2018	2019	2020	2021	2022	2023	2024	2025	SR	W–L	Win %
World Championship
World Championship	NH	DNQ	NH	SF	NH	QF	NH	QF	NH	SF	NH	SF	NH		DNQ	NH	DNQ	NH	0 / 5	3–5	38%
Win–loss	0–0	0–0	0–0	1–1	0–0	0–1	0–0	0–1	0–0	1–1	0–0	1–1	0–0	0–0	0–0	0–0	0–0	0–0	0 / 5	3–5	38%
Grand Slam tournaments
Australian Open	QF	QF	NH	SF	SF	SF	A	SF	W	F	F	F	W	NH	A	W	F	W	4 / 14	24–10	71%
British Open	A	1R	QF	QF	QF	SF	QF	W	SF	SF	F	SF	NH	A	SF	A	A		1 / 12	12–10	55%
French Open	A	A	QF	A	SF	NH	QF	SF	SF	F	F	SF	NH		SF	A	A		0 / 9	8–9	47%
US Open	A	A	A	QF	SF	SF	A	A	F	F	A	SF	A	A	SF	A	A	A	0 / 7	10–7	59%
Win–loss	0–1	1–2	1–2	3–3	2–4	3–3	0–2	4–2	7–3	7–4	6–3	5–4	3–0	0–0	4–2	3–0	2–1	3–0	5 / 42	54–36	60%
IRTPA Sanctioned Tournaments
IRTPA Championship	NH								F	A	SF	NH							0 / 2	3–1	75%
Win–loss	0–0	0–0	0–0	0–0	0–0	0–0	0–0	0–0	2–0	0–0	1–1	0–0	0–0	0–0	0–0	0–0	0–0	0–0	0 / 2	3–1	75%
Career Statistics
	2008	2009	2010	2011	2012	2013	2014	2015	2016	2017	2018	2019	2020	2021	2022	2023	2024	2025	Career		
Tournaments	1	2	2	4	4	4	2	4	5	5	4	5	1	0	3	1	1	1	Career total: 49		
Titles	0	0	0	0	0	0	0	1	1	0	0	0	1	0	0	1	0	1	Career total: 5		
Finals	0	0	0	0	0	0	0	1	2	3	3	1	1	0	0	1	1	1	Career total: 14		
Overall win–loss	0–1	1–2	1–2	4–4	2–4	3–4	0–2	4–3	9–3	8–5	7–4	6–5	3–0	0–0	4–2	3–0	2–1	3–0	60–42		59%
Win %	0%	33%	33%	50%	33%	43%	0%	57%	75%	62%	64%	55%	100%	–	67%	100%	67%	100%	Career total: 59%		
