= 2017 Champions Trophy (real tennis) =

- Date: 11-16 July
- Edition: 1st
- Category: IRTPA
- Draw: 8S / 4Q
- Location: Hampton Court Palace, London, United Kingdom
- Venue: Royal Tennis Court

Champions

Men's singles
- (United States) Camden Riviere
Champions Trophy (real tennis)	· 2018 →

The 2017 Champions Trophy was the inaugural edition of the Champions Trophy. It was held at the Royal Tennis Court from 11 to 16 July. It was a qualifying event for the 2018 Real Tennis World Championship.

The tournament was won by incumbent World Champion Camden Riviere. Riviere would go on to win the 2018 edition as well. In the final, he beat Ben Taylor-Matthews, his first of four finals appearances. The two also met in the first round, with Riviere also the victor.

== Draw and results ==
Amateur players are marked as (A)

=== Qualifying ===
The qualifying was one group of four players, with the top two players progressing to the main draw.

	(United Kingdom) Long	(United Kingdom) Wright	(United Kingdom) Durack	(United Kingdom) Dawes	W–L	Set W–L	Game W–L	Standings
(United Kingdom) D Long (Q)		9/6	9/2	w/o	3–0	2–0 (100%)	18–8 (69%)	1st
(United Kingdom) P Wright (Q, A)	6/9		9/7	9/2	2–1	2–1 (67%)	24–18 (57%)	2nd
(United Kingdom) T Durack	2/9	7/9		9/7	1–2	1–2 (33%)	18–25 (42%)	3rd
(United Kingdom) J Dawes	w/o	2/9	7/9		0–3	0–2 (0%)	9–18 (33%)	4th

=== Main Draw ===
The Champions Trophy operates a repechage format for the first four seeds, where the first round losers progress to a second quarter final against the winners between the fifth and sixth seeds and the qualifiers. Australian amateur Kieran Booth was originally listed as the fifth seed but withdrew, promoting John Lumley to the main draw and Peter Wright into qualifying.

First quarter finals
1	(United States) C Riviere	6	6	6
3	(United Kingdom) B Taylor-Matthews	1	1	0
Q	(United Kingdom) P Wright (A)	6	0	3	5
6	(United Kingdom) J Lumley	0	6	6	6
Q	(United Kingdom) D Long	1	1	1
5	(Australia) N Howell	6	6	6
4	(Australia) C Chapman	6	5	6	1	6
2	(Australia) R Fahey	3	6	0	6	3

Second quarter finals
3	(United Kingdom) B Taylor-Matthews	6	4	6	6
6	(United Kingdom) J Lumley	5	6	0	4
5	(Australia) N Howell	6	6	6
2	(Australia) R Fahey	2	2	2

Semi finals
1	(United States) C Riviere	6	6	6
5	(Australia) N Howell	2	1	0
3	(United Kingdom) B Taylor-Matthews	6	6	6
4	(Australia) C Chapman	2	3	4

Final
1	(United States) C Riviere	2	1	0
3	(United Kingdom) B Taylor-Matthews	6	6	6
