= 2015 British Open (real tennis) =

- Date: 15-24 November (men); 8-12 April (women)
- Edition: 37th
- Category: IRTPA
- Draw: 24S / 12D (men); 13S / 7D (women)
- Location: West Kensington, London, United Kingdom (men); Radley, Oxfordshire, United Kingdom (men's qualifying); Hayling Island, United Kingdom (women)
- Venue: Queen's Club (men); Radley College (men's qualifying); Seacourt Tennis Club (women)

Champions

Men's singles
- (Australia) Steve Virgona

Women's singles
- (United Kingdom) Claire Fahey

Men's doubles
- (Australia) Steve Virgona / (Australia) Chris Chapman

Women's doubles
- (United Kingdom) Claire Fahey / (United Kingdom) Sarah Vigrass
← 2014 ·	British Open (real tennis)	· 2016 →

The 2015 Real Tennis British Open was the 37th edition of the British Open since it became an annual event in 1979. The men's event was held at the Queen's Club in London between November 15–24, 2015 and was organised by the Tennis and Rackets Association. The qualifying tournament was held on November 11–12 at Radley College. It was the final event in the qualifying series for the 2016 Real Tennis World Championship. The women's event was held at the Seacourt Tennis Club on Hayling Island between April 8–12, 2015. The men's draw was the fourth and final grand slam event of the year.

The men's singles draw was won by Steve Virgona, his second British Open title, having previously won the 2013 edition. It is Virgona's last Open singles victory of his career to date. He also won the doubles with Chris Chapman. It would be Chapman's only British Open doubles title. In the women's draw, Claire Fahey won her six consecutive British Open singles title, her only Open title of the year. She also won the doubles with her sister Sarah Vigrass.

== Draw and results ==
Amateur players are marked as (A)

=== Men's Singles Qualifying ===
==== First Qualifier ====
Qualifying Round 1				Final Qualifying Round
				(United Kingdom) A Player	6	3	4
(United Kingdom) C Braham (A)	6	5	6	(United Kingdom) C Braham (A)	5	6	6
(United Kingdom) T Seymour-Mead (A)	3	6	0

==== Second Qualifier ====
Final Qualifying Round
(United Kingdom) A Dolman (A)	6	6
(United Kingdom) J Prenn (A)	1	2

==== Third Qualifier ====
Final Qualifying Round
(United Kingdom) M Seigneur	6	6
(United Kingdom) L Gordon	2	3

==== Fourth Qualifier ====
Final Qualifying Round
(United Kingdom) R Shenkman (A)	2	6	6
(United Kingdom) Z Eadle	6	1	5

=== Men's Singles ===
First round
(United Kingdom) N Hatchett (A)	6	4	4	5
(United Kingdom) R Krznaric	5	6	6	4
(United Kingdom) D Long	6	5	6	1	6
(United Kingdom) C Braham (A)	0	6	1	6	0
(United Kingdom) J Dawes	6	6	6
(United Kingdom) W Burns	3	2	2
(Australia) A Fowler	4	4	6	6	6
(United Kingdom) P Wright (A)	6	6	3	1	3
(United Kingdom) A Dolman (A)	6
(United Kingdom) A Lyons	5
(United Kingdom) C Medlow (A)	5	6	6	5	4
(United Kingdom) E Kay (A)	6	3	4	6	6
(United Kingdom) R Shenkman (A)	1	2	3
(United Kingdom) C Greenhalgh	6	6	6
(United Kingdom) T Durack	4	5	6	6	6
(United Kingdom) M Seigneur	6	6	3	1	0

Second Round
1	(Australia) R Fahey	6	6	6
(United Kingdom) N Hatchett (A)	0	2	0
8	(Australia) N Howell	6	3	6	4	6
(United Kingdom) D Long	5	6	5	6	5
5	(United Kingdom) B Taylor-Matthews	6	6	6
(United Kingdom) J Dawes	4	1	2
4	(United States) T Chisholm	3	6	6	6
(Australia) A Fowler	6	2	1	2
3	(United Kingdom) B Sayers	6	6	6
(United Kingdom) A Dolman (A)	1	0	0
7	(Australia) C Chapman	6	6	6
(United Kingdom) E Kay (A)	3	4	1
6	(Australia) K Booth (A)	6	6	6
(United Kingdom) C Greenhalgh	3	0	3
2	(Australia) S Virgona	6	6	6
(United Kingdom) T Durack	1	0	1

Quarterfinals
1	(Australia) R Fahey	6	6	6
8	(Australia) N Howell	2	0	4
5	(United Kingdom) B Taylor-Matthews	4	3	1
4	(United States) T Chisholm	6	6	6
3	(United Kingdom) B Sayers	6	6	6
7	(Australia) C Chapman	1	2	1
6	(Australia) K Booth (A)	0	2	0
2	(Australia) S Virgona	6	6	6

Semifinals
1	(Australia) R Fahey	2	2	6	6	4
4	(United Kingdom) T Chisholm	6	6	2	1	6
3	(United Kingdom) B Sayers	2	6	4	6	2
2	(Australia) S Virgona	6	3	6	3	6

Finals
4	(United States) T Chisholm	3	2	4
2	(Australia) S Virgona	6	6	6

=== Men's Doubles ===
First round
(United Kingdom) T Seymour-Mead (A) (United Kingdom) M Seigneur	3	6	5	6	6
(United Kingdom) J Camp (A) (United Kingdom) E Kay	6	5	6	2	6
(Australia) N Howell (United Kingdom) C Medlow (A)	6	6	6
(United Kingdom) W Burns (Australia) J Dawes	5	4	1
(Australia) A Fowler (United Kingdom) A Lyons	3	1	6	2
(United Kingdom) C Greenhalgh (United Kingdom) D Long	6	6	3	6
Q	(United Kingdom) L Gordon (United Kingdom) A Player	6	6	6
(United Kingdom) R Shenkman (A) (United Kingdom) B Snell (A)	4	2	5

Quarter-finals
1	(Australia) R Fahey (United States) T Chisholm	6	6	6
(United Kingdom) T Seymour-Mead (A) (United Kingdom) M Seigneur	0	2	1
3	(United Kingdom) B Sayers (United Kingdom) R Smith	6	5	6	6
6	(Australia) N Howell (United Kingdom) C Medlow (A)	5	6	3	2
4	(Australia) S Virgona (Australia) C Chapman	6	6	6
(United Kingdom) C Greenhalgh (United Kingdom) D Long	0	0	1
2	(Australia) K Booth (United Kingdom) B Taylor-Matthews	6	6	6
(United Kingdom) L Gordon (United Kingdom) A Player	1	2	3

Semi-finals
1	(Australia) R Fahey (United States) T Chisholm	4	3	3
3	(United Kingdom) B Sayers (United Kingdom) R Smith	6	6	6
4	(Australia) S Virgona (Australia) C Chapman	6	6	6
2	(Australia) K Booth (A) (United Kingdom) B Taylor-Matthews	0	0	0

Final
3	(United Kingdom) B Sayers (United Kingdom) R Smith	3	6	2	5
4	(Australia) S Virgona (Australia) C Chapman	6	2	6	6

=== Women's Singles Qualifying ===
==== First Qualifier ====
Final Qualifying Round
(United Kingdom) L Hutchinson	0	0
(United Kingdom) J Newby	6	6

==== Second Qualifier ====
Final Qualifying Round
(United Kingdom) J Guardia	0	0
(United Kingdom) J Garside	6	6

==== Third Qualifier ====
Final Qualifying Round
(United Kingdom) M Henderson-Tew	3	2
(United Kingdom) I Candy	6	6

==== Fourth Qualifier ====
Final Qualifying Round
(United Kingdom) H Ingham	6	6
(United Kingdom) G Willis	0	2

==== Fifth Qualifier ====
Final Qualifying Round
(United Kingdom) A Perie	1	0
(United Kingdom) K Prottey	6	6

=== Women's Singles ===
Note: all players are amateurs except Claire Fahey

First round
5	(United Kingdom) A Garside	6	6
Q	(United Kingdom) J Newby	2	3
Q	(United Kingdom) J Garside	1	1
3	(United Kingdom) P Lumley	6	6
4	(Latvia) F Adam	6	6
(United Kingdom) I Candy	0	0
Q	(United Kingdom) H Ingham	5	6	6
6	(Latvia) I Dulbish	6	4	5
(United Kingdom) T Lumley	6	6
Q	(United Kingdom) K Prottey	1	0

Second round
1	(United Kingdom) C Fahey
bye
5	(United Kingdom) A Garside	0	1
3	(United Kingdom) P Lumley	6	6
4	(United States) F Adam	6	6
(United Kingdom) H Ingham	5	0
(United Kingdom) T Lumley	0	2
2	(United Kingdom) S Vigrass	6	6

Semifinals
1	(United Kingdom) C Fahey	6	6
3	(United Kingdom) P Lumley	0	0
4	(United States) F Adam	2	3
2	(United Kingdom) S Vigrass	6	6

Finals
1	(United Kingdom) C Fahey	6	6
2	(United Kingdom) S Vigrass	2	1

=== Women's Doubles Qualifying ===
==== First Qualifier ====
Final Qualifying Round
(United Kingdom) L Ford (United Kingdom) R Law	0	0
(United Kingdom) G Willis (United Kingdom) M Henderson-Tew	6	6

==== Second Qualifier ====
Final Qualifying Round
(United Kingdom) A Garside (United Kingdom) J Garside	6	6
(United Kingdom) C Armstrong-Smith (United Kingdom) L Hutchinson	0	0

=== Women's Doubles ===
Note: all players are amateurs except Claire Fahey

Quarterfinals
1	(United Kingdom) C Fahey (United Kingdom) S Vigrass	6	6
(United Kingdom) L Medlow (United Kingdom) C MacDowell	0	0
Q	(United Kingdom) G Willis (United Kingdom) M Henderson-Tew	2	0
3	(United Kingdom) S Haswell (United Kingdom) H Ingham	6	6
4	(United States) F Adam (Latvia) I Dulbish	3	6
Q	(United Kingdom) A Garside (United Kingdom) J Garside	6	2	2
(France) B Bidouze (United Kingdom) I Candy	2	0
2	(United Kingdom) P Lumley (United Kingdom) T Lumley	6	6

Semifinals
1	(United Kingdom) C Fahey (United Kingdom) S Vigrass	6	6
3	(United Kingdom) S Haswell (United Kingdom) H Ingham	1	0
4	(United States) F Adam (Latvia) I Dulbish	6	6
2	(United Kingdom) P Lumley (United Kingdom) T Lumley	4	3

Finals
1	(United Kingdom) C Fahey (United Kingdom) S Vigrass	6	6
4	(United States) F Adam (Latvia) I Dulbish	1	3

== See also ==
- Grand Slam (real tennis)
