= 2017 British Open (real tennis) =

- Date: 17-26 November (men); 4-7 April (women)
- Edition: 39th
- Category: IRTPA
- Draw: 24S / 12D (men); 13S / 7D (women)
- Location: West Kensington, London, United Kingdom (men); Hayling Island, United Kingdom (women)
- Venue: Queen's Club (men); Seacourt Tennis Club (women)

Champions

Men's singles
- (United States) Camden Riviere

Women's singles
- (United Kingdom) Claire Fahey

Men's doubles
- (United States) Camden Riviere / (United States) Tim Chisholm

Women's doubles
- (United Kingdom) Claire Fahey / (United Kingdom) Sarah Vigrass
| ← 2016 · | British Open (real tennis) | · 2018 → |

The 2017 Real Tennis British Open was the 39th edition of the British Open since it became an annual event in 1979. The men's event was held at the Queen's Club in London between November 12–21, 2017 and was organised by the Tennis and Rackets Association. It was the final event in the qualifying series for the 2018 Real Tennis World Championship. The women's event was held at the Seacourt Tennis Club on Hayling Island between April 5–9, 2017. The men's draw was the fourth and final grand slam event of the year.

The men's singles draw was won by Camden Riviere, his third British Open title. By completing his victory, he also completed his first calendar year grand slam. He also won the doubles with Tim Chisholm, becoming the first male pair to complete a calendar year grand slam in doubles. In the women's draw, Claire Fahey won her fifth British Open singles title, forming part of her fifth calendar year Grand Slam. She also won the doubles with her sister Sarah Vigrass. The event featured the British Open debut of incumbent Australian Open doubles champion Saskia Bollerman.

== Draw and results ==
Amateur players are marked as (A)

=== Men's Singles Qualifying ===
==== First Qualifier ====
| Qualifying Round 1 | | | Final Qualifying Round |
| | | | (United Kingdom) J Smith | 2 | 2 |
| (United Kingdom) W Burns | 6 | 6 | (United Kingdom) W Burns | 6 | 6 |
| (United Kingdom) H Eddis (A) | 3 | 3 |

==== Second Qualifier ====
| Qualifying Round 1 | | | | Final Qualifying Round |
| | | | | (United Kingdom) C Fahey | 5 | 6 | 6 |
| (United Kingdom) N Mackenzie | 3 | 6 | 6 | (United Kingdom) N Mackenzie | 6 | 2 | 4 |
| (United Kingdom) A Dolman (A) | 6 | 2 | 1 |

==== Third Qualifier ====
| Qualifying Round 1 | | | Final Qualifying Round |
| | | | (United Kingdom) C Greenhalgh | 6 | 6 |
| (United Kingdom) G Parsons | 6 | 6 | (United Kingdom) G Parsons | 1 | 5 |
| (United Kingdom) T Seymour Mead (A) | 4 | 1 |

==== Fourth Qualifier ====
| Qualifying Round 1 | | | | Final Qualifying Round |
| | | | | (United Kingdom) A Player | 6 | 4 | 5 |
| (United Kingdom) P Dunn (A) | 6 | 5 | 6 | (United Kingdom) P Dunn (A) | 5 | 6 | 6 |
| (United Kingdom) S Taylor (A) | 5 | 6 | 3 |

=== Men's Singles ===
First round
(United Kingdom) J Giddins (A) | 6 | 6 | 6
Q | (United Kingdom) C Fahey | 4 | 4 | 4
(France) M Sarlangue (A) | 2 | 6 | 6 | 2 | 4
(United Kingdom) J Douglas (A) | 6 | 3 | 2 | 6 | 6
Q | (United Kingdom) C Greenhalgh | 6 | 6 | 6
(United Kingdom) L Gordon | 1 | 1 | 4
(United Kingdom) P Wright | 4 | 6 | 6 | 6
(United Kingdom) R Shenkman (A) | 6 | 5 | 2 | 1
(United Kingdom) D Long | 3 | 4 | 6 | 6 | 6
(United Kingdom) E Kay (A) | 6 | 6 | 2 | 3 | 1
(United Kingdom) Z Eadle | 3 | 1 | 4
(United Kingdom) N Howell | 6 | 6 | 6
(United Kingdom) T Durack | 6 | 6 | 2 | 6
Q | (United Kingdom) W Burns | 5 | 4 | 6 | 5
Q | (United Kingdom) P Dunn (A) | 4 | 1 | 2
(United Kingdom) R McNaughtan | 6 | 6 | 6

Second Round
1 | (United States) C Riviere | 6 | 6 | 6
(United Kingdom) J Giddins (A) | 1 | 0 | 1
6 | (United States) T Chisholm | 3 | 6 | 6 | 6
(United Kingdom) J Douglas (A) | 6 | 3 | 4 | 2
8 | (Australia) K Booth (A) | 6 | 6 | 6
Q | (United Kingdom) C Greenhalgh | 4 | 1 | 1
4 | (Australia) C Chapman | 6 | 6 | 6
(United Kingdom) P Wright (A) | 0 | 4 | 2
3 | (Australia) S Virgona | 6 | 6 | 6
(United Kingdom) D Long | 1 | 0 | 0
7 | (United Kingdom) B Sayers | 6 | 6 | 6
(Australia) N Howell | 1 | 1 | 2
5 | (United Kingdom) B Taylor-Matthews | 6 | 6 | 6
(United Kingdom) T Durack | 2 | 1 | 2
2 | (Australia) R Fahey | 6 | 6 | 6
(United Kingdom) R McNaughtan | 2 | 4 | 2

Quarterfinals
1 | (United States) C Riviere | w/o
6 | (United States) T Chisholm
8 | (Australia) K Booth (A) | 2 | 6 | 6 | 5 | 3
4 | (Australia) C Chapman | 6 | 4 | 2 | 6 | 6
3 | (Australia) S Virgona | 6 | 3 | 6 | 1 | 0
7 | (United Kingdom) B Sayers | 2 | 6 | 0 | 6 | 6
5 | (United States) B Taylor-Matthews | 2 | 6 | 4 | 4
2 | (Australia) R Fahey | 6 | 4 | 6 | 6

Semifinals
1 | (United States) C Riviere | 6 | 6 | 6
4 | (Australia) C Chapman | 0 | 1 | 1
7 | (United Kingdom) B Sayers | 6 | 4 | 6 | 6
2 | (Australia) R Fahey | 3 | 6 | 2 | 5

Finals
1 | (United States) C Riviere | 6 | 6 | 6
7 | (United Kingdom) B Sayers | 4 | 0 | 3

=== Men's Doubles Qualifying ===
==== First Qualifier ====
| Qualifying Round 1 | | | | Final Qualifying Round |
| | | | | 1 | (United Kingdom) T Durack (United Kingdom) L Gordon | w/o |
| (United Kingdom) N Mackenzie (United Kingdom) H Cary (A) | 1 | 6 | 6 | | (United Kingdom) N Mackenzie (United Kingdom) H Cary (A) |
| (United Kingdom) Z Eadle (United Kingdom) G Parsons | 6 | 5 | 5 |

==== Second Qualifier ====
| Qualifying Round 1 | | | | Final Qualifying Round |
| | (United Kingdom) J Acheson-Gray (A) (United Kingdom) A Dolman (A) | 6 | 6 |
| | (United Kingdom) H Eddis (A) (United Kingdom) T Seymour-Mead (A) | 1 | 5 | | (United Kingdom) J Acheson-Gray (A) (United Kingdom) A Dolman (A) | 6 | 1 | 4 |
| 2 | (United Kingdom) J Smith (United Kingdom) N Wood | 6 | 6 | 2 | (United Kingdom) J Smith (United Kingdom) N Wood | 3 | 6 | 6 |
| | (United Kingdom) C Fahey (United Kingdom) S Taylor | 3 | 3 |

=== Men's Doubles ===
First round
(United Kingdom) C Greenhalgh (United Kingdom) D Long | 6 | 2 | 5 | 1
(United Kingdom) R McNaughtan (France) M Sarlangue (A) | 3 | 6 | 6 | 6
6 | (United Kingdom) J Douglas (A) (United Kingdom) P Wright (A) | 4 | 6 | 6 | 2 | 3
(United Kingdom) J Dawes (United Kingdom) W Burns | 6 | 1 | 0 | 6 | 6
(United Kingdom) A Lyons (United Kingdom) A Player | 2 | 3 | 1
5 | (United Kingdom) R Shenkman (A) (United Kingdom) B Taylor-Matthews | 6 | 6 | 6
(United Kingdom) T Durack (United Kingdom) L Gordon | 0 | 6 | 3 | 6 | 1
(United Kingdom) N Wood (United Kingdom) J Smith | 6 | 0 | 6 | 3 | 6

Quarter-finals
1 | (United States) C Riviere (United States) T Chisholm | 6 | 6 | 6
(United Kingdom) R McNaughtan (France) M Sarlangue (A) | 1 | 0 | 0
4 | (Australia) C Chapman (Australia) S Virgona | 6 | 6 | 6
(United Kingdom) J Dawes (United Kingdom) W Burns | 0 | 1 | 0
3 | (Australia) K Booth (A) (United Kingdom) B Sayers | 6 | 2 | 6 | 6
5 | (United Kingdom) R Shenkman (A) (United Kingdom) B Taylor-Matthews | 3 | 6 | 1 | 3
2 | (Australia) R Fahey (Australia) N Howell | 6 | 6 | 6
(United Kingdom) N Wood (United Kingdom) J Smith | 0 | 1 | 4

Semi-finals
1 | (United States) C Riviere (United States) T Chisholm | 6 | 6 | 6
4 | (Australia) C Chapman (Australia) S Virgona | 3 | 5 | 0
3 | (Australia) K Booth (A) (United Kingdom) B Sayers | 5 | 2 | 4
2 | (Australia) R Fahey (Australia) N Howell | 6 | 6 | 6

Final
1 | (United States) C Riviere (United States) T Chisholm | 6 | 3 | 6 | 6
2 | (Australia) R Fahey (Australia) N Howell | 0 | 6 | 5 | 5

=== Women's Singles Qualifying ===
==== First Qualifier ====
| Final Qualifying Round |
| (United Kingdom) I Candy | 6 | 6 |
| (United Kingdom) G Willis | 5 | 3 |

=== Women's Singles ===
Note: all players are amateurs except Claire Fahey

First round
Q | (United Kingdom) I Candy | 1 | 6 | 2
(United States) F Adam | 6 | 3 | 6
(United Kingdom) J Garside | 3 | 2
4 | (Latvia) I Dulbish | 6 | 6
3 | (United Kingdom) P Lumley | 6 | 6
(United Kingdom) A Garside | 2 | 1
(United Kingdom) T Lumley | 3 | 2
(Netherlands) S Bollerman | 6 | 6
(United Kingdom) C Bucknell | 6 | 6
(United Kingdom) L Hutchinson | 1 | 5
(United Kingdom) I Hunt | 0 | 0
2 | (United Kingdom) S Vigrass | 6 | 6

Second round
1 | (United Kingdom) C Fahey
bye
(United States) F Adam | 4 | 0
4 | (Latvia) I Dulbish | 6 | 6
3 | (United Kingdom) P Lumley | 6 | 5
(Netherlands) S Bollerman | 1 | 6 | 6
(United Kingdom) C Bucknell | 0 | 0
2 | (United Kingdom) S Vigrass | 6 | 6

Semifinals
1 | (United Kingdom) C Fahey | 6 | 6
4 | (Latvia) I Dulbish | 1 | 1
(Netherlands) S Bollerman | 6 | 3 | 0
2 | (United Kingdom) S Vigrass | 3 | 6 | 6

Finals
1 | (United Kingdom) C Fahey | 6 | 6
3 | (United Kingdom) S Vigrass | 1 | 1

=== Women's Doubles Qualifying ===
==== First Qualifier ====
| Final Qualifying Round |
| (United Kingdom) I Candy (United Kingdom) G Willis | 6 | 6 |
| (United Kingdom) I Hunt (United Kingdom) C Bucknell | 0 | 1 |

==== Second Qualifier ====
| Final Qualifying Round |
| (United Kingdom) A Garside (United Kingdom) J Garside | 6 | 6 |
| (United Kingdom) C Armstrong-Smith (United Kingdom) J Carter | 0 | 1 |

=== Women's Doubles ===
Note: all players are amateurs except Claire Fahey

Quarterfinals
(Netherlands) S Bollerman (United Kingdom) S Haswell | 6
Q | (United Kingdom) I Candy (United Kingdom) G Willis | 1
(United States) F Adam (Latvia) I Dulbish | 6
(United Kingdom) L Huchinson (United Kingdom) C Nicholls | 0
Q | (United Kingdom) A Garside (United Kingdom) J Garside | 2
2 | (United Kingdom) P Lumley (United Kingdom) T Lumley | 6

Semifinals
1 | (United Kingdom) C Fahey (United Kingdom) S Vigrass | 6
(Netherlands) S Bollerman (United Kingdom) S Haswell | 1
(United States) F Adam (Latvia) I Dulbish | 1
2 | (United Kingdom) P Lumley (United Kingdom) T Lumley | 6

Finals
1 | (United Kingdom) C Fahey (United Kingdom) S Vigrass | 6
2 | (United Kingdom) P Lumley (United Kingdom) T Lumley | 2

== See also ==
- Grand Slam (real tennis)
