= 2018 Champions Trophy (real tennis) =

- Date: 16-22 July
- Edition: 2nd
- Category: IRTPA
- Draw: 8S / 4Q
- Location: Hampton Court Palace, London, United Kingdom
- Venue: Royal Tennis Court

Champions

Men's singles
- (United States) Camden Riviere
← 2017 ·	Champions Trophy (real tennis)	· 2019 →

The 2018 Champions Trophy was the 2nd edition of the Champions Trophy. It was held at the Royal Tennis Court from 16 to 22 July. It was a qualifying event for the 2022 Real Tennis World Championship.

The tournament was won by former World Champion Camden Riviere, defending his title from 2017. He beat Chris Chapman in the final, it what would be Chapman's only Champions Trophy final appearance.

== Draw and results ==
Amateur players are marked as (A)

=== Qualifying ===
The qualifying was one group of four players, with the top two players progressing to the main draw.

	(United Kingdom) Lumley	(France) Sarlangue	(United Kingdom) Long	(United Kingdom) Durack	W–L	Set W–L	Game W–L	Standings
(United Kingdom) J Lumley (Q)		9/4	9/4	6/2	3–0	3–0 (100%)	27–12 (69%)	1st
(France) M Sarlangue (Q, A)	4/9		9/6	9/4	2–1	2–1 (67%)	22–19 (54%)	2nd
(United Kingdom) D Long	4/9	6/9		9/4	1–2	1–2 (33%)	19–22 (46%)	3rd
(United Kingdom) T Durack	4/9	2/6	4/9		0–3	0–3 (0%)	10–24 (29%)	4th

=== Main Draw ===
The Champions Trophy operates a repechage format for the first four seeds, where the first round losers progress to a second quarter final against the winners between the fifth and sixth seeds and the qualifiers.

First quarter finals
1	(United States) C Riviere	6	6	6
(Australia) C Chapman	4	3	3
(Australia) K Booth (A)	0	1	1
Q	(United Kingdom) J Lumley	6	6	6
Q	(France) M Sarlangue (A)	3	6	4	1
(Australia) N Howell	6	5	6	6
(United Kingdom) B Taylor-Matthews	2	6	4	5
2	(Australia) R Fahey	6	4	6	6

Second quarter finals
(Australia) C Chapman	6	6	6
Q	(United Kingdom) J Lumley	3	1	4
(Australia) N Howell	6	6	4	4
(United Kingdom) B Taylor-Matthews	3	1	6	6	6

Semi finals
1	(United States) C Riviere	5	6	6	6
(United Kingdom) B Taylor-Matthews	1	0	6	3
(Australia) C Chapman	6	6	4	6
2	(Australia) R Fahey	4	4	6	5

Final
1	(United States) C Riviere	3	6	6	6
(Australia) C Chapman	6	0	1	2
