= Ben Taylor-Matthews =

British real tennis player

- Full name: Ben Taylor-Matthews
- Country (sports): United Kingdom
- Residence: United Kingdom
- Born: 27 July 1984 (age 41)
- Plays: Right-handed
- Club: Bristol Real Tennis Club

World Championships
- Open Singles: First Round Eliminator (2012, 2022, 2023)
- Open Doubles: F (2011)

Singles
- Career titles: 0
- Highest ranking: 4
- Current ranking: 4

Grand Slam singles results
- Australian Open: F (2014, 2016)
- British Open: F (2021)
- French Open: F (2018)
- US Open: SF (2011, 2016, 2017, 2018, 2020, 2023, 2025)

Doubles
- Career titles: 3
- Current ranking: 6

Grand Slam doubles results
- Australian Open: F (2011, 2016, 2025)
- French Open: W (2018, 2023)
- British Open: F (2021)
- US Open: W (2010)

Ben Taylor-Matthews (born 27 July 1984) is a professional British Real Tennis player based at Bristol Real Tennis Club. His career high ranking is world number 4, and his current ranking is 5. To date, he is yet to win a major singles title but has contested two Australian Open finals, as well as an IRTPA Championships final, plus four Champions Trophy finals. He unsuccessfully challenged for the World Championship on three occasions, most recently in 2023. He is due to challenge again for the World Championship in 2025.

== Career ==
Taylor-Matthews began his real tennis career as a trainee professional at the Hyde Real Tennis Club in Bridport, Dorset. He quickly rose through the ranks of the game, dropping his handicap below 20.0 in 2004. He played his first top-level tournament at the 2004 IRTPA Championships at The Oratory School, defeating Craig Greenhalgh in qualifying, but losing to Ricardo Smith in the first round. In 2006, he moved to the Royal Tennis Court at Hampton Court Palace to play as the Assistant Professional under former World Champion Camden Riviere, and later under Nick Wood.

Taylor-Matthews's tennis continued to improve through the 2005 season, progressing through qualifying at the British Open to his first main draw Open match which he lost to Peter Paterson from Cambridge. He won the Category B Championships in 2006, bringing his handicap into single figures for the first time. He won his first Open match at the 2006 French Open against Josh Bainton in 5 sets. By the 2009 season, Taylor-Matthews won the Category A Championships in Oxford and reached the quarter final stage at three of the four Open championships that year. His breakout season continued at the 2009 IRTPA Championships at Manchester, reaching the final for the first time losing to World Champion Robert Fahey. This started an eight-year run where Taylor-Matthews progressed to at least the quarter final stage at all major competitions, broken only at the 2017 French Open against French champion Matthieu Sarlangue.

In 2010, Taylor-Matthews won his first doubles Open title, partnering with then-doubles World Champion Steve Virgona to win the US Open, defeating Camden Riviere and Tim Chisholm in straight sets. In 2011, he partnered with 19-time British Amateur Champion Julian Snow in the World Doubles Championship in Melbourne. After defeating Chris Chapman and Ruaraidh Gunn in the semi final, Taylor-Matthews and Snow lost to Robert Fahey and Steve Virgona 5 sets to 0.

By virtue of a run of semi final performances in a matter of months at the 2010 British Open, 2011 Australian Open and 2011 US Open, Taylor-Matthews qualified to challenge for the 2012 Real Tennis World Championship. Taylor-Matthews was drawn into a First Round Eliminator against Queen's Club professional Bryn Sayers. The format for the match was to be the winner of three home-and-away best of 5 set matches. Taylor-Matthews opted to play his home match at Prested Tennis Club, which he won 3 sets to 1. However, he lost to Sayers in straight sets at the away match at Queen's, sending the fixture into a deciding third match, also held at Queen's due to Sayers' higher World Ranking. Sayers proved the victor again, 3 sets to 1, but would lose to eventual challenger Steve Virgona in the Final Eliminator. At the end of the 2012 season, Taylor-Matthews moved to a role as Senior Professional at Hatfield House Real Tennis Club in Hertfordshire.

Taylor-Matthews next highlight was reaching the final of the 2014 and 2016 Australian Opens, losing to Robert Fahey in straight sets on both occasions. Despite this, he missed qualification for the 2014, 2016 and 2018 World Championships. At this time, he moved to take up the Head Professional role at the Leamington Tennis Court Club. His next breakthrough was at the 2018 French Open, where he won the doubles competition with John Lumley, defeating Steve Virgona and Chris Chapman in the final in 5 sets. Singles titles would remain elusive, however, even though he was regularly reaching the semi final stages of most Opens.

In 2020, Taylor-Matthews qualified to challenge for the Singles World Championship for the second time based on his results across the 2018 and 2019 seasons. Drawn as the third seed, Taylor-Matthews played against second seed Chris Chapman in the first round eliminator, played as a best of 9 set match across two days at Chapman's home court in Melbourne. After the first day, the match was tied at 2 sets all. Starting the second day, the players exchanged sets a third time before Chapman took the final two sets to win the match. Chapman would go on to lose to eventual Champion Camden Riviere in the Final Eliminator. Due to the COVID-19 pandemic, the final would eventually be played in 2022, even though the Eliminators took place in 2020.

During the Eliminator process and subsequent pandemic, Taylor-Matthews started a real tennis themed podcast with fellow player Robert Shenkman called "A View From the Hazards". He moved to become head professional at Bristol Real Tennis Club in 2022. When play resumed, Taylor-Matthews reached the final of the British Open for the first time, losing to John Lumley. He also reached the final of the Champions Trophy for the second time in 2022, losing to Fahey.

Taylor-Matthews would again qualify for the World Championship Eliminators in 2023. This time he was second seed, but he failed to beat the bid to host the First Round Eliminator to third seed Nick Howell, so the best of 9 set match was hosted at Howell's home club at Aiken. In front of a boisterous crowd, the first three sets of the match were very tight 5-all sets, with Howell ultimately leading after the first day 3 sets to 1. Taylor-Matthews rallied to win the first set of the second day, but couldn't bring it back far enough with Howell winning the final two sets and the match. Howell will go on to lose to John Lumley in the Final Eliminator. 2023 did bring Taylor-Matthews success on the doubles court, winning the French Open with Steve Virgona, as well as the final of the US Open. 2024 did not start as well, with a first round loss at the Australian Open to Australian amateur Kieran Booth. Taylor-Matthews would win his first Singles competition since the 2009 Category A Championship at the 2024 Jesmond Dene Cup. By the middle of the year, he had recovered his form enough to reach a third consecutive Champions Trophy Final, losing to Nick Howell. He ended the year by reaching the semi final of the British Open, securing himself the third seed for the 2025 Eliminators.

Taylor-Matthews started 2025 by reaching the semi final of the Australian Open, losing in an upset result to Kieran Booth. He reached the doubles final playing with Robert Fahey, losing to Camden Riviere and Chris Chapman in five sets.

== Performance timeline ==
=== Singles ===
Key
W	F	SF	QF	#R	RR	Q#	DNQ	A	NH

(W) winner; (F) finalist; (SF) semifinalist; (QF) quarterfinalist; (#R) rounds 4, 3, 2, 1; (RR) round-robin stage; (Q#) qualification round; (DNQ) did not qualify; (A) absent; (NH) not held; (SR) strike rate (events won / competed); (W–L) win–loss record.
To avoid confusion and double counting, these charts are updated at the conclusion of a tournament or when the player's participation has ended.

Current through the 2025 Australian Open

Tournament	2004	2005	2006	2007	2008	2009	2010	2011	2012	2013	2014	2015	2016	2017	2018	2019	2020	2021	2022	2023	2024	2025	SR	W–L	Win %
World Championship
World Championship	DNQ	NH	DNQ	NH	DNQ	NH	DNQ	NH	1R	NH	DNQ	NH	DNQ	NH	DNQ	NH			1R	1R	NH	TBC	0 / 3	1–4	20%
Win–loss	0–0	0–0	0–0	0–0	0–0	0–0	0–0	0–0	1–2	0–0	0–0	0–0	0–0	0–0	0–0	0–0	0–0	0–0	0–1	0–1	0–0	0–0	0 / 3	1–4	20%
Grand Slam tournaments
Australian Open	A	A	A	A	A	1R	A	SF	A	A	F	A	F	SF	A	SF	A	NH	A	A	1R	SF	0 / 8	13–8	62%
British Open	A	1R	2R	2R	QF	QF	SF	QF	QF	QF	QF	QF	QF	QF	SF	SF	NH	F	QF	QF	SF		0 / 19	24–19	56%
French Open	Q1	A	QF	QF	1R	QF	QF	QF	QF	QF	A	SF	QF	1R	F	QF	NH		QF	SF	A		0 / 15	15–16	48%
US Open	A	A	A	1R	2R	QF	QF	SF	QF	QF	QF	QF	SF	SF	SF	SF	SF	A	2R	SF	QF	SF	0 / 18	22–18	55%
Win–loss	0–0	0–1	2–2	1–4	1–3	2–4	4–3	6–4	3–3	3–3	5–3	4–3	5–4	5–4	7–3	8–4	1–1	3–1	2–3	5–3	3–3	4–2	0 / 60	74–61	99%
IRTPA Sanctioned Tournaments
Champions Trophy	NH													F	SF	SF	NH		F	F	F		0 / 6	10–10	50%
European Open	NH	A	A	1R	A	SF	NH	QF	SF	SF	NH	SF	NH										0 / 6	6–6	50%
IRTPA Championship	1R	2R	Q1	Q1	NH	F	QF	SF	SF	QF	SF	SF	NH	SF	SF	QF	NH						0 / 12	18–11	62%
US Pro	A	A	A	2R	QF	2R	QF	QF	QF	QF	QF	QF	SF	QF	SF	SF	NH	A	SF	SF	SF		0 / 16	21–16	57%
Win–loss	0–1	0–1	0–0	1–2	1–1	6–3	2–2	4–3	4–3	3–2	3–2	4–3	2–1	5–4	5–4	4–3	0–0	0–0	3–3	4–2	4–3	0–0	0 / 40	55–43	56%
Career Statistics
	2004	2005	2006	2007	2008	2009	2010	2011	2012	2013	2014	2015	2016	2017	2018	2019	2020	2021	2022	2023	2024	2025	Career		
Tournaments	1	2	2	5	4	7	5	7	7	6	5	6	5	7	6	7	1	1	6	6	5	2	Career total: 103		
Titles	0	0	0	0	0	0	0	0	0	0	0	0	0	0	0	0	0	0	0	0	0	0	Career total: 0		
Finals	0	0	0	0	0	1	0	0	0	0	1	0	1	1	1	0	0	1	1	1	1	0	Career total: 9		
Overall win–loss	0–1	0–2	2–2	2–6	2–4	8–7	6–5	10–7	8–8	6–5	8–5	8–6	7–5	10–8	12–7	12–7	1–1	3–1	5–7	9–6	7–6	4–2	130–108		55%
Win %	0%	0%	50%	25%	33%	53%	55%	59%	50%	55%	62%	57%	58%	56%	63%	63%	50%	75%	42%	60%	54%	67%	Career total: 55%		

=== Doubles ===
Tournament	2006	2007	2008	2009	2010	2011	2012	2013	2014	2015	2016	2017	2018	2019	2020	2021	2022	2023	2024	2025	SR	W–L	Win %
World Championship
World Championship	NH	QF	NH	QF	NH	F	NH	SF	NH	SF	NH	SF	NH	SF	NH		SF	NH	SF	NH	0 / 9	6–9	40%
Win–loss	0–0	0–1	0–0	0–1	0–0	2–1	0–0	1–0	0–0	1–1	0–0	1–1	0–0	1–1	0–0	0–0	0–2	0–0	0–1	0–0	0 / 9	6–9	40%
Grand Slam tournaments
Australian Open	A	A	A	A	NH	F	A	A	QF	A	F	QF	A	QF	A	NH	A	A	SF	F	0 / 7	7–7	50%
British Open	QF	SF	QF	SF	SF	QF	QF	SF	QF	SF	SF	QF	SF	SF	NH	F	SF	SF	SF		0 / 18	19–18	51%
French Open	A	SF	QF	1R	SF	A	SF	NH	A	F	SF	QF	W	SF	NH		SF	W	A		2 / 12	13–10	57%
US Open	A	QF	QF	SF	W	QF	SF	SF	SF	SF	SF	QF	SF	QF	F	A	QF	F	QF	SF	1 / 18	19–16	54%
Win–loss	1–1	3–3	2–3	2–3	5–2	2–3	3–3	2–2	3–3	3–3	6–4	2–4	5–2	2–4	2–1	2–1	2–3	6–1	2–3	2–1	3 / 55	58–51	53%
IRTPA Sanctioned Tournaments
IRTPA Championship	NH	SF	NH								F	SF	W	NH							1 / 4	5–2	71%
Win–loss	0–0	1–1	0–0	0–0	0–0	0–0	0–0	0–0	0–0	0–0	2–0	0–1	2–0	0–0	0–0	0–0	0–0	0–0	0–0	0–0	1 / 4	5–2	71%
Career Statistics
	2006	2007	2008	2009	2010	2011	2012	2013	2014	2015	2016	2017	2018	2019	2020	2021	2022	2023	2024	2025	Career		
Tournaments	1	5	3	4	3	4	3	3	3	4	5	6	4	5	1	1	4	3	4	2	Career total: 68		
Titles	0	0	0	0	1	0	0	0	0	0	0	0	2	0	0	0	0	1	0	0	Career total: 4		
Finals	0	0	0	0	1	2	0	0	0	1	1	0	2	0	1	1	0	1	0	1	Career total: 11		
Overall win–loss	1–1	4–5	2–3	2–4	5–2	4–4	3–3	3–2	3–3	4–4	8–4	3–6	7–2	3–5	2–1	2–1	2–5	6–1	2–4	3–2	69–62		53%
Win %	50%	44%	40%	33%	71%	50%	50%	60%	50%	50%	67%	33%	78%	38%	67%	67%	29%	86%	33%	60%	Career total: 53%		
