= Kieran Booth =

Australian real tennis player

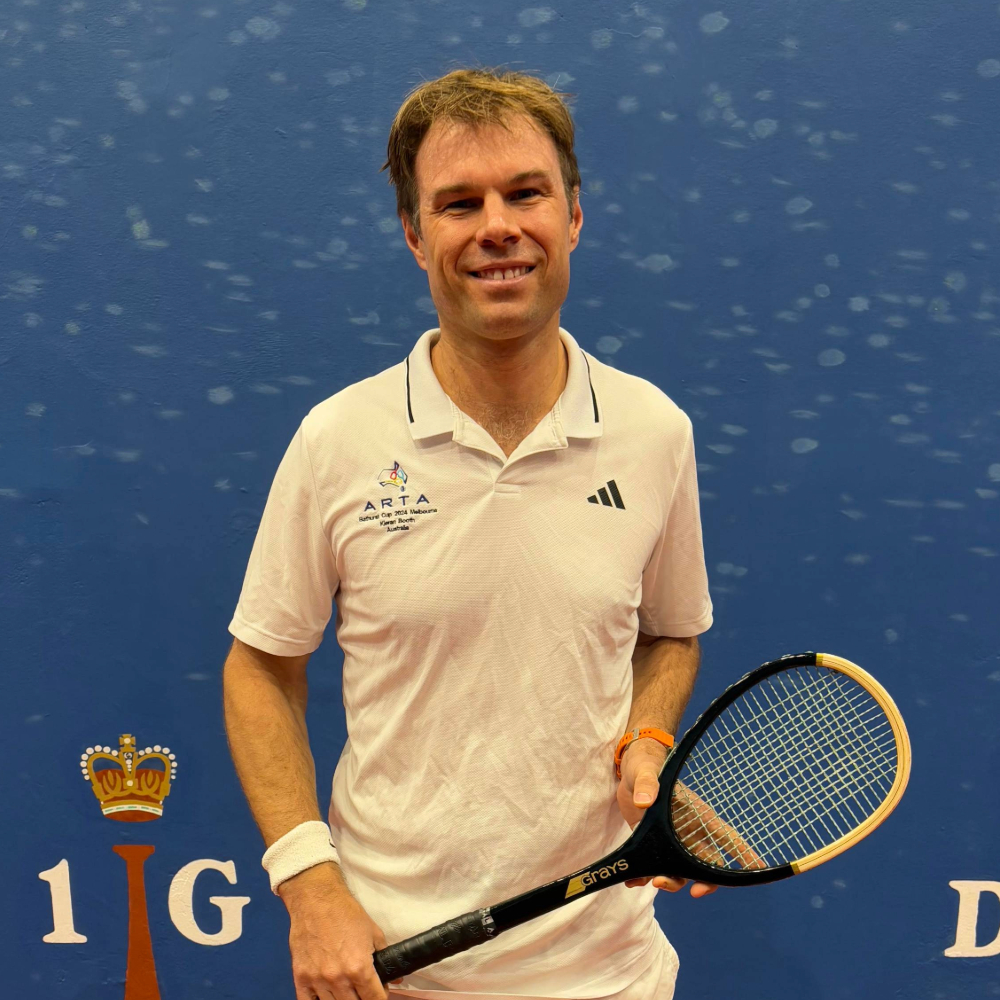
- Booth at the 2025 Australian Open
- Full name: Kieran Booth
- Country (sports): Australia
- Residence: Australia
- Born: 12 July 1980 (age 45)
- Plays: Right-handed
- Club: Royal Melbourne Tennis Club

Singles
- Career titles: 0
- Current ranking: 13

Grand Slam singles results
- Australian Open: F (2020, 2025)
- British Open: QF (2011, 2012, 2013, 2014 2015, 2016, 2017, 2018)
- French Open: SF (2017)
- US Open: SF (2014)

Doubles
- Career titles: 4
- Current ranking: 15

Grand Slam doubles results
- Australian Open: W (2005, 2006, 2013, 2022)
- French Open: F (2015)
- British Open: F (2011, 2012)
- US Open: SF (2012, 2015)

Kieran Booth (born 12 July 1980) is an amateur Australian real tennis player currently based at the Royal Melbourne Tennis Club. He has won the Australian Open doubles on four occasions, most recently in 2022. He reached the final of the Australian Open singles in 2020 and 2025, and semi-finals at the French and US Open. Booth is also the current Australian Amateur Champion, having won the title 12 times.

== Career ==
Booth began playing real tennis at the Hobart Real Tennis Club as a junior. He won the World Junior Championships in 2003 at the Royal Melbourne Tennis Club, beating Barney Tanfield in the final. Booth's first major international competition was the Bathurst Cup in 2004 at the Manchester Tennis and Racquet Club, where he represented Australia in the predominant international amateur team competition. Booth lost his first round match to Great Britain's Julian Snow, but won both his matches in the third place playoff against France. He spent the remainder of the 2004/05 season competing the UK. He made his British Open debut, losing in the first round to Rod McNaughtan. He also won the final of the MCC All-Comers in 2005, but lost the MCC Silver Racquet to Spike Willcocks.

Returning to Australia, he reached his first career Open semi final at the 2005 Australian Open, after beating Mike Happell in the quarter final. He repeated the feat in 2006, beating future World Champion Camden Riviere in the quarter final in four sets. Booth also won the Australian Open doubles in both 2005 and 2006, partnered with Steve Virgona – his first Open wins. He also represented Australia in the 2006 Bathurst Cup in Melbourne, but again lost his first round match to Snow.

After the 2006 Victorian Amateur Championships, Booth retired from competitive real tennis. However, he returned to play the doubles at the 2009 Australian Open with Gerard Eden. He later won the Australian Amateur Championships in 2009 against Bret Richardson. In 2010, Booth returned to competitive Open competitions, starting a run of 32 consecutive Open appearances including 23 consecutive Open quarter final appearances.

In 2011, Booth reached the final of the British Open with partner Bryn Sayers. They defeated James Stout and Mike Gooding in the semi finals in five sets, but lost to World Champions Robert Fahey and Steve Virgona in the final. Booth also entered the 2011 World Doubles Championships in Melbourne with Frank Filippelli, losing to Fahey and Virgona in the semi finals. He also led the Australian team to the first of four consecutive Bathurst Cup victories in New York.

In 2012, Booth reached three of four Open doubles finals, partnered with Bryn Sayers at the US and British Opens and Hilton Booth at the Australian Open. In each final – as well as the French Open semifinal – he was defeated by Virgona, partnered with Tim Chisholm, Fahey or John Lumley. Booth joined forces with Virgona at the 2013 Australian Open, winning it by defeating Camden Riviere and Nick Howell in the final. It would be Riviere's last Open doubles match defeat for at least the next eleven years. At the 2013 World Doubles Championship – held in lieu of the French Open doubles that year – Booth and Sayers were forced to withdraw after their quarter final victory over McNaughtan and Matthieu Sarlangue.

2014 saw Booth's best singles performance to date outside Australia, beating Ricardo Smith to reach the semi finals of the US Open for the first time. In 2015, Booth repeated his feat of three calendar year Open doubles finals, this time partnered with Ben Taylor-Matthews at the French and British Opens, Virgona at the US Open and Bret Richardson in the Australian Open, however he could not find a victory over either the future World Champions Riviere and Chisholm. In 2016, Booth reached his first French Open semi final after defeating fellow Australian Chris Chapman in the quarter final. He lost his semi final to eventual champion Riviere. 2017 saw Booth's run of quarter final appearances come to an end when he lost the first round of the US Open to John Lumley. Having missed the 2018 US Open and French Opens, Booth made his final international appearance at the 2018 British Open, losing his final match to Taylor-Matthews in straight sets.

Booth continued playing in domestic Australian tournaments, notably reaching an Open final for the first time at the 2020 Australian Open. Having defeated Sarlangue in the semi final, he lost to Chapman in the final in four sets. Booth also teamed up with Lumley at the 2022 Australian Open, winning the final against Howell and Richardson. In 2024, he led Australia to another Bathurst Cup victory in Melbourne, having missed the 2022 edition.

At the start of 2025, Booth reached the final of the Australian Open, his second of his career, losing to Riviere. He also reached the doubles semi final with Oliver Pridmore.

== Performance timeline ==
=== Singles ===
Key
W	F	SF	QF	#R	RR	Q#	DNQ	A	NH

(W) winner; (F) finalist; (SF) semifinalist; (QF) quarterfinalist; (#R) rounds 4, 3, 2, 1; (RR) round-robin stage; (Q#) qualification round; (DNQ) did not qualify; (A) absent; (NH) not held; (SR) strike rate (events won / competed); (W–L) win–loss record.
To avoid confusion and double counting, these charts are updated at the conclusion of a tournament or when the player's participation has ended.

Current through the 2025 Australian Open

Tournament	2004	2005	2006	2007	2008	2009	2010	2011	2012	2013	2014	2015	2016	2017	2018	2019	2020	2021	2022	2023	2024	2025	SR	W–L	Win %
Grand Slam tournaments
Australian Open	A	SF	SF	A	A	A	SF	QF	SF	SF	SF	SF	QF	QF	SF	QF	F	NH	SF	SF	SF	F	0 / 17	27–17	61%
British Open	1R	A	A	A	A	A	2R	QF	QF	QF	QF	QF	QF	QF	QF	A	NH	A	A	A	A		0 / 10	9–10	47%
French Open	A	A	A	A	A	A	1R	QF	QF	QF	QF	QF	SF	QF	A	A	NH		A	A	A		0 / 8	8–8	50%
US Open	A	A	A	A	A	A	1R	2R	QF	QF	SF	QF	QF	2R	A	A	A	A	A	A	A	A	0 / 8	6–8	43%
Win–loss	0–1	1–1	2–1	0–0	0–0	0–0	3–4	3–4	5–4	5–4	6–4	4–4	5–4	3–4	3–2	1–1	2–1	0–0	1–1	1–1	2–1	3–1	0 / 43	50–43	54%
IRTPA Sanctioned Tournaments
Champions Trophy	NH									NH				A	1R	A	NH		A	A	A		0 / 1	0–1	0%
IRTPA Championship	A	A	A	A	NH	A	A	A	A	A	A	A	NH	QF	A	A	NH					A	0 / 1	1–1	50%
US Pro	A	A	A	A	A	A	A	A	A	A	QF	QF	QF	QF	QF	A	NH	A	A	A	A		0 / 5	5–5	50%
Win–loss	0–0	0–0	0–0	0–0	0–0	0–0	0–0	0–0	0–0	0–0	1–1	1–1	1–1	2–2	1–2	0–0	0–0	0–0	0–0	0–0	0–0	0–0	0 / 7	6–7	46%
Career Statistics
	2004	2005	2006	2007	2008	2009	2010	2011	2012	2013	2014	2015	2016	2017	2018	2019	2020	2021	2022	2023	2024	2025	Career		
Tournaments	1	1	1	0	0	0	4	4	4	4	5	5	5	6	4	1	1	0	1	1	1	1	Career total: 50		
Titles	0	0	0	0	0	0	0	0	0	0	0	0	0	0	0	0	0	0	0	0	0	0	Career total: 0		
Finals	0	0	0	0	0	0	0	0	0	0	0	0	0	0	0	0	1	0	0	0	0	1	Career total: 2		
Overall win–loss	0–1	1–1	2–1	0–0	0–0	0–0	3–4	3–4	5–4	5–4	7–5	5–5	6–5	5–6	4–4	1–1	2–1	0–0	1–1	1–1	2–1	3–1	56–50		53%
Win %	0%	50%	67%	–	–	–	43%	43%	56%	56%	58%	50%	55%	45%	50%	50%	67%	–	50%	50%	67%	75%	Career total: 53%		

=== Doubles ===
Tournament	2005	2006	2007	2008	2009	2010	2011	2012	2013	2014	2015	2016	2017	2018	2019	2020	2021	2022	2023	2024	2025	SR	W–L	Win %
World Championship
World Championship	DNQ	NH	DNQ	NH	DNQ	NH	SF	NH	SF	NH	SF	NH	DNQ	NH	DNQ	NH		DNQ	NH	DNQ	NH	0 / 3	3–2	60%
Win–loss	0–0	0–0	0–0	0–0	0–0	0–0	1–1	0–0	1–0	0–0	1–1	0–0	0–0	0–0	0–0	0–0	0–0	0–0	0–0	0–0	0–0	0 / 3	3–2	60%
Grand Slam tournaments
Australian Open	W	W	A	A	QF	NH	SF	F	W	SF	F	F	SF	F	SF	F	NH	W	F	QF	SF	4 / 17	25–11	69%
British Open	A	A	A	A	A	1R	F	F	SF	QF	SF	QF	SF	QF	A	NH	A	A	A	A		0 / 9	9–9	50%
French Open	NH	A	A	A	A	QF	QF	SF	NH	SF	F	QF	SF	A	A	NH		A	A	A		0 / 7	5–7	42%
US Open	A	A	A	A	A	QF	SF	F	SF	SF	F	A	SF	A	A	A	A	A	A	A	A	0 / 7	8–7	53%
Win–loss	1–0	1–0	0–0	0–0	1–1	1–3	5–3	7–4	4–2	5–3	5–4	3–3	4–4	3–2	1–1	2–1	0–0	2–0	1–1	0–1	1–1	4 / 40	47–34	58%
IRTPA Sanctioned Tournaments
Win–loss	0–0	0–0	0–0	0–0	0–0	0–0	0–0	0–0	0–0	0–0	0–0	0–0	0–0	0–0	0–0	0–0	0–0	0–0	0–0	0–0	0–0	0 / 0	0–0	–
Career Statistics
	2005	2006	2007	2008	2009	2010	2011	2012	2013	2014	2015	2016	2017	2018	2019	2020	2021	2022	2023	2024	2025	Career		
Tournaments	1	1	0	0	1	3	5	4	4	4	5	3	4	2	1	1	0	1	1	1	1	Career total: 43		
Titles	1	1	0	0	0	0	0	0	1	0	0	0	0	0	0	0	0	1	0	0	0	Career total: 4		
Finals	1	1	0	0	0	0	1	3	1	0	3	1	0	1	0	1	0	1	1	0	0	Career total: 15		
Overall win–loss	1–0	1–0	0–0	0–0	1–1	1–3	6–4	7–4	5–2	5–3	6–5	3–3	4–4	3–2	1–1	2–1	0–0	2–0	1–1	0–1	1–1	50–36		58%
Win %	100%	100%	–	–	50%	25%	60%	64%	71%	63%	55%	50%	50%	60%	50%	67%	–	100%	50%	0%	50%	Career total: 58%		
