= Nick Howell (real tennis) =

Australian real tennis player

- Full name: Nick Howell
- Country (sports): Australia
- Residence: United States
- Born: 10 September 1986 (age 38)
- Plays: Right-handed
- Club: Aiken Tennis Club

World Championships
- Open Singles: Final Eliminator (2023); First Round Eliminator (2020)
- Open Doubles: F (2019)

Singles
- Career titles: 1
- Highest ranking: 3
- Current ranking: 3

Grand Slam singles results
- Australian Open: F (2019, 2022, 2023, 2024)
- British Open: F (2024)
- French Open: W (2023)
- US Open: F (2020)

Doubles
- Career titles: 6
- Highest ranking: 2
- Current ranking: 2

Grand Slam doubles results
- Australian Open: W (2018, 2020, 2023)
- French Open: W (2024)
- British Open: W (2018, 2021)
- US Open: F (2018, 2019, 2022, 2023)

Nick Howell (born 10 September 1986) is a professional real tennis player based at the Aiken Tennis Club in Aiken, South Carolina. Howell currently ranked number 3 in the world in singles and 2 in the world in doubles and won the French Open in 2023. Howell has challenged for the Real Tennis World Championship on two occasions, playing in the First Round Eliminator in 2020 and the Final Eliminator in 2023.

== Career ==
Nick Howell was born in Bordeaux, France where his father, Jonathan Howell, worked as the real tennis professional. Jonathan Howell won the Australian Open Doubles in 1989. In 1990, Jonathan Howell was appointed as head professional at the newly built court at The Oratory School in Woodcote, Oxfordshire. Both Nick Howell and his brother Benny Howell were educated at the Oratory School. Benny Howell went on to play county cricket for Hampshire and Gloucestershire. Nick Howell grew up playing real tennis and participated in the IRTPA Satellite when it was held at the Oratory in 2005, as well as competing at the Australian Open in 2006. Shortly after, Jonathan Howell would move to the Royal Melbourne Tennis Club in 2008.

After leaving school, Nick Howell turned professional in golf. From age 18 onwards, Howell competed in the PGA EuroPro Tour, the PGA Tour of Australasia and the Jamega Tour. However, after seven years as a golf professional, Howell failed to get a tour card and retired from competitive golf. Instead, he returned to real tennis, moving to the Royal Melbourne Tennis Club where his father was the deputy head professional. Howell registered as an Australian real tennis player, instead of his country of birth (France) or education (United Kingdom) due to his time spent in Australia. His brother Benny Howell registered as English for the purposes of his sport.

Howell returned to competitive real tennis at the 2012 Australian Open, losing in straight sets to World Champion Robert Fahey in the first round. Through the 2013 season, Howell competed in the second tier tournaments such as the US Pro Satellite, the IRTPA Satellite and the Victorian Open. During this year, he won the Taylor Cup - a tournament for new professionals - against women's World Champion Claire Fahey. He also reached the 2013 Australian Open Final partnered with Camden Riviere. In 2014, Howell made his debut appearance at the remaining three Open tournaments - the British, French and US Opens. He won US Pro Satellite and Tasmanian Open in 2014, but he had a breakout year on the doubles court, reaching the semi final stage of the British and US Opens partnered with Australian Amateur Kieran Booth and rackets World Champion James Stout respectively. In both tournaments, Howell was defeated by Camden Riviere and Tim Chisholm.

In 2015, Howell reached his first singles Open semi final at the Australian Open, bringing his handicap better than scratch in the process. Howell moved from Melbourne to the International Tennis Hall of Fame in Newport, Rhode Island. As he was now a resident American professional, he competed in and reached the final of the US National, losing in 5 sets to John Lumley He was now regularly reaching quarter finals of singles competitions and semi finals of doubles competitions.

Following his defeat at the 2017 World Doubles Championship at Prested Hall, Robert Fahey partnered with Howell as a new long-term doubles partnership. They debuted their pairing at the 2017 US Open Doubles competition, reaching the semi final. In 2018, the pair won the Australian and British Opens together and reached the final of the 2019 World Doubles Championship in Hobart.

Howell reached his first Open final at the 2019 Australian Open. Combined with the rest of his results from the 2018 and 2019 seasons, Howell was eligible to compete for the 2020 Real Tennis World Championship. As the fourth seed, Howell drew first seed Camden Riviere in the First Round Eliminator. The match was played as a best of 9 set match at Howell's alma mater at The Oratory School. Although the match was scheduled over two days, as Riviere won the first four sets he had the option to play the fifth set on the first day. Riviere exercised that option and won the final set and thus the match. The final of the championships was ultimately delayed until 2022 due to the COVID-19 pandemic. Two weeks later, Howell reached the final of the US Open for the first time, again losing to Camden Riviere.

In 2020, Howell moved to Bordeaux, the city of his birth, to become the head professional at the new court in Mérignac. However, immediately after his move, France went into lockdown and Howell was unable to compete in competitions. Once lockdowns had lifted, Howell hosted the 2022 World Doubles Championship at his home club in Bordeaux. However, an injury during the semi final prevented further progress in the tournament. Howell moved to become head professional at the Aiken Tennis Club in late 2022. Howell would make all four doubles Open finals in 2023, including winning the Australian Open with Chris Chapman.

Another Australian Open Singles Final in 2022 meant that Howell was again eligible to challenge for the 2023 Real Tennis World Championship. This time as second seed following the retirement of Robert Fahey, Howell hosted the First Round Eliminator at Aiken against Ben Taylor-Matthews. The match was again a best of nine format. After the first day, Howell led three sets to one, with the first three sets going to five games all. Howell dropped the first set of the secon day, but rallied to with the final two sets and the match. In the Final Eliminator, Howell played John Lumley at Lumley's home court in Philadelphia in a best of 13 set match. Howell only managed to win the seventh set, and failed to force the match in to a third day. Later in 2023, Howell won his first Open title at the French Open, defeating Steve Virgona in the final. In 2024, Howell reached the Australian Open final for the third consecutive year, and won the Champions Trophy at the Royal Tennis Court, defeating Ben Taylor-Matthews in the final. He failed in his defence of the French Open, losing in the final to Camden Riviere, but teamed up with Camden for his first French Open doubles title. He finished the season by reaching the singles and doubles finals at the British Open, his first British Open singles final appearance.

== Performance timeline ==
=== Singles ===
Key
W	F	SF	QF	#R	RR	Q#	DNQ	A	NH

(W) winner; (F) finalist; (SF) semifinalist; (QF) quarterfinalist; (#R) rounds 4, 3, 2, 1; (RR) round-robin stage; (Q#) qualification round; (DNQ) did not qualify; (A) absent; (NH) not held; (SR) strike rate (events won / competed); (W–L) win–loss record.
To avoid confusion and double counting, these charts are updated at the conclusion of a tournament or when the player's participation has ended.

Current through the 2025 US Open

Tournament	2005	2006	2007	2008	2009	2010	2011	2012	2013	2014	2015	2016	2017	2018	2019	2020	2021	2022	2023	2024	2025	SR	W–L	Win %
World Championship
World Championship	NH	DNQ	NH	DNQ	NH	DNQ	NH	DNQ	NH	DNQ	NH	DNQ	NH	DNQ	NH			1R	2R	NH	TBC	0 / 2	1–2	33%
Win–loss	0–0	0–0	0–0	0–0	0–0	0–0	0–0	0–0	0–0	0–0	0–0	0–0	0–0	0–0	0–0	0–0	0–0	0–1	1–1	0–0	0–0	0 / 2	1–2	33%
Grand Slam tournaments
Australian Open	A	1R	A	A	A	A	A	1R	A	1R	SF	QF	QF	SF	F	QF	NH	F	F	F	A	0 / 12	17–12	59%
British Open	A	A	A	A	A	A	A	A	A	2R	QF	2R	2R	QF	QF	NH	QF	SF	SF	F		0 / 10	14–10	58%
French Open	A	A	A	A	A	A	A	A	A	QF	A	SF	1R	QF	SF	NH		SF	W	F		1 / 8	15–7	68%
US Open	A	A	A	A	A	A	A	A	A	QF	A	2R	QF	QF	QF	F	A	2R	QF	QF	QF	0 / 10	9–11	45%
Win–loss	0–0	0–1	0–0	0–0	0–0	0–0	0–0	0–1	0–0	2–4	3–2	4–4	4–4	5–4	7–5	2–2	1–1	6–4	10–3	10–4	1–1	1 / 40	55–40	58%
IRTPA Sanctioned Tournaments
Champions Trophy	NH									NH			SF	QF	QF	NH		A	QF	W		1 / 5	6–7	46%
European Open	A	A	A	A	A	NH	A	A	A	NH	QF	NH									NH	0 / 1	0–1	0%
IRTPA Championship	Q1	A	A	NH	A	A	A	1R	1R	A	QF	NH	QF	QF	SF	NH						0 / 6	5–6	45%
US Pro	A	A	A	A	A	A	A	A	Q1	1R	QF	QF	SF	QF	QF	NH	A	QF	QF	SF		0 / 9	10–9	53%
Win–loss	0–0	0–0	0–0	0–0	0–0	0–0	0–0	0–1	0–1	0–1	2–3	1–1	5–3	3–3	3–4	0–0	0–0	1–1	1–3	5–2	0–0	1 / 21	21–23	48%
Career Statistics
	2005	2006	2007	2008	2009	2010	2011	2012	2013	2014	2015	2016	2017	2018	2019	2020	2021	2022	2023	2024	2025	Career		
Tournaments	0	1	0	0	0	0	0	2	1	5	5	5	7	7	7	2	1	6	7	6	1	Career total: 63		
Titles	0	0	0	0	0	0	0	0	0	0	0	0	0	0	0	0	0	0	1	1	0	Career total: 2		
Finals	0	0	0	0	0	0	0	0	0	0	0	0	0	0	1	1	0	1	2	4	0	Career total: 9		
Overall win–loss	0–0	0–1	0–0	0–0	0–0	0–0	0–0	0–2	0–1	2–5	5–5	5–5	9–7	8–7	10–9	2–2	1–1	7–6	12–7	15–6	1–1	77–65		54%
Win %	–	0%	–	–	–	–	–	0%	0%	29%	50%	50%	56%	53%	53%	50%	50%	54%	63%	71%	50%	Career total: 54%		

=== Doubles ===
Tournament	2012	2013	2014	2015	2016	2017	2018	2019	2020	2021	2022	2023	2024	2025	SR	W–L	Win %
World Championship
World Championship	NH	DNQ	NH	QF	NH	DNQ	NH	F	NH		SF	NH	SF	NH	0 / 4	3–4	43%
Win–loss	0–0	0–0	0–0	0–1	0–0	0–0	0–0	2–1	0–0	0–0	1–1	0–0	0–1	0–0	0 / 4	3–4	43%
Grand Slam tournaments
Australian Open	QF	F	QF	SF	SF	SF	W	SF	W	NH	F	W	F	A	3 / 12	20–9	69%
British Open	A	A	SF	QF	1R	F	W	F	NH	W	SF	F	F		2 / 10	17–8	68%
French Open	A	NH	QF	A	QF	SF	SF	F	NH		F	F	W		1 / 8	10–7	59%
US Open	A	A	SF	A	SF	SF	F	F	SF	A	F	F	QF	SF	0 / 10	13–9	59%
Win–loss	0–1	2–1	4–4	1–2	2–4	5–4	9–2	7–4	4–1	3–0	7–4	9–2	6–3	1–1	6 / 40	60–33	65%
IRTPA Sanctioned Tournaments
IRTPA Championship	NH				A	A	F	NH							0 / 1	1–1	50%
Win–loss	0–0	0–0	0–0	0–0	0–0	0–0	1–1	0–0	0–0	0–0	0–0	0–0	0–0	0–0	0 / 1	1–1	50%
Career Statistics
	2012	2013	2014	2015	2016	2017	2018	2019	2020	2021	2022	2023	2024	2025	Career		
Tournaments	1	1	4	3	4	4	5	5	2	1	5	4	5	1	Career total: 45		
Titles	0	0	0	0	0	0	2	0	1	1	0	1	1	0	Career total: 6		
Finals	0	1	0	0	0	1	4	4	1	1	3	3	3	0	Career total: 21		
Overall win–loss	0–1	2–1	4–4	1–3	2–4	5–4	10–3	9–5	4–1	3–0	8–5	9–2	6–4	1–1	64–38		63%
Win %	0%	67%	50%	25%	33%	56%	77%	64%	80%	100%	62%	82%	60%	50%	Career total: 63%		
