= 2019 Champions Trophy (real tennis) =

- Date: 15-21 July
- Edition: 3rd
- Category: IRTPA
- Draw: 8S / 4Q
- Location: Hampton Court Palace, London, United Kingdom
- Venue: Royal Tennis Court

Champions

Men's singles
- (Australia) Robert Fahey
← 2018 ·	Champions Trophy (real tennis)	· 2022 →

The 2019 Champions Trophy was the 3rd edition of the Champions Trophy. It was held at the Royal Tennis Court from 15 to 21 July. It was a qualifying event for the 2022 Real Tennis World Championship. It would be the last Champions Trophy held until 2022 due to the COVID-19 pandemic.

The tournament was won by incumbent World Champion Robert Fahey. It was his first victory in the tournament, having lost in the semi finals of his only other participation in 2018. John Lumley was the runner-up for the first time, later going on to win the 2023 edition.

== Draw and results ==
Amateur players are marked as (A)

=== Qualifying ===
The qualifying was one group of four players, with the top two players progressing to the main draw.

	(United Kingdom) Sayers	(France) Sarlangue	(United Kingdom) Shenkman	(United Kingdom) Durack	W–L	Set W–L	Game W–L	Standings
(United Kingdom) B Sayers (Q)		8/9	9/1	9/1	2–1	2–1 (67%)	26–11 (70%)	1st
(France) M Sarlangue (Q, A)	9/8		6/9	9/0	2–1	2–1 (0%)	24–17 (59%)	2nd
(United Kingdom) R Shenkman (A)	1/9	9/6		9/3	2–1	2–1 (67%)	19–18 (51%)	3rd
(United Kingdom) T Durack	1/9	0/9	3/9		0–3	0–3 (0%)	3–27 (10%)	4th

=== Main Draw ===
The Champions Trophy operates a repechage format for the first four seeds, where the first round losers progress to a second quarter final against the winners between the fifth and sixth seeds and the qualifiers.

First quarter finals
1	(Australia) R Fahey	4	6	6	6
4	(United Kingdom) N Howell	6	2	0	3
Q	(United Kingdom) B Sayers	6	3	3	5
5	(United Kingdom) J Lumley	2	6	6	6
Q	(France) M Sarlangue (A)	6	6	3	6
6	(United Kingdom) D Long	1	2	6	4
2	(Australia) C Chapman	5
3	(United Kingdom) B Taylor-Matthews	6

Second quarter finals
4	(Australia) N Howell	6	6	5	5	2
5	(United Kingdom) J Lumley	3	2	6	6	6
Q	(France) M Sarlangue (A)	w/o
2	(Australia) C Chapman

Semi finals
1	(Australia) R Fahey	6	6	3	6
Q	(France) M Sarlangue (A)	1	0	6	3
5	(United Kingdom) J Lumley	6	6	6
3	(United Kingdom) B Taylor-Matthews	3	2	1

Final
1	(Australia) R Fahey	6	6	6
5	(United Kingdom) J Lumley	2	4	4
