= 2016 British Open (real tennis) =

- Date: 14-22 November (men); 6-10 April (women)
- Edition: 38th
- Category: IRTPA
- Draw: 24S / 12D (men); 13S / 7D (women)
- Location: West Kensington, London, United Kingdom (men); Hayling Island, United Kingdom (women)
- Venue: Queen's Club (men); Seacourt Tennis Club (women)

Champions

Men's singles
- (United States) Camden Riviere

Women's singles
- (United Kingdom) Sarah Vigrass

Men's doubles
- (United States) Camden Riviere / (United States) Tim Chisholm

Women's doubles
- (United States) Frederika Adam / (Latvia) Irina Dulbish
← 2015 ·	British Open (real tennis)	· 2017 →

The 2016 Real Tennis British Open was the 38th edition of the British Open since it became an annual event in 1979. The men's event was held at the Queen's Club in London between November 13–22, 2016 and was organised by the Tennis and Rackets Association. It formed part of the qualifying series for the 2018 Real Tennis World Championship. The women's event was held at the Seacourt Tennis Club on Hayling Island between April 6–10, 2016. The men's draw was the fourth and final grand slam event of the year.

The men's singles draw was won by Camden Riviere, his second British Open title, having previously won the 2014 edition. By completing his victory, he also completed his first calendar year grand slam. He also won the doubles with Tim Chisholm, their second British Open title as a pair. Chris Chapman reached the final of the singles draw for the first time, having not previously progressed beyond a quarter final. In the women's draw, Sarah Vigrass won her first British Open singles title in the absence of defending champion and Vigrass's sister Claire Fahey. In the doubles, Frederika Adam and Irina Dulbish won their first British Open doubles title as a pair, having won the French and US Opens the previous year.

== Draw and results ==
Amateur players are marked as (A)

=== Men's Singles Qualifying ===
==== First Qualifier ====
Qualifying Round 1			Final Qualifying Round
			Q	(United Kingdom) C Braham	6	6
(United Kingdom) H Eddis (A)	6	6		(United Kingdom) H Eddis	2	3
(United Kingdom) A Player	2	2

==== Second Qualifier ====
Qualifying Round 1				Final Qualifying Round
				(United Kingdom) J Male (A)	6	0	4
(United Kingdom) L Gordon	6	2	6	(United Kingdom) L Gordon	5	6	6
(United Kingdom) Zak Eadle (A)	1	6	5

==== Third Qualifier ====
Qualifying Round 1			Final Qualifying Round
			(Australia) A Fowler	6	6
(United Kingdom) C Greenhalgh	6	6	(United Kingdom) C Greenhalgh	5	3
(United Kingdom) A Dolman (A)	2	1

==== Fourth Qualifier ====
Qualifying Round 1			Final Qualifying Round
			(United Kingdom) W Burns	6	1	5
(United Kingdom) T Seymour-Mead (A)	6	6	(United Kingdom) T Seymour-Mead (A)	5	6	6
(United Kingdom) J Smith	5	2

=== Men's Singles ===
First round
(United Kingdom) T Durack	2	0	6	1
(United Kingdom) E Kay	6	6	3	6
(Bermuda) J Stout	6	4	6	6
(United Kingdom) P Wright (A)	2	6	2	3
Q	(United Kingdom) T Seymour-Mead (A)	3	3	0
(Australia) N Howell	6	6	6
(United Kingdom) C Braham (A)	6	6	6
(United Kingdom) J Dawes	4	4	1
(United Kingdom) D Long	6	3	5	6	4
(France) M Sarlangue (A)	2	6	6	5	6
(United Kingdom) L Danby (A)	6	4	6	4	6
Q	(United Kingdom) L Gordon	5	6	4	6	5
Q	(Australia) A Fowler	2	2	1
(United Kingdom) R Smith	6	6	6
(United Kingdom) M Gooding	2	1	0
(United Kingdom) J Lumley	6	6	6

Second Round
1	(United States) C Riviere	6	6	6
(United Kingdom) E Kay (A)	4	0	2
5	(United States) T Chisholm	6	6	6
(Bermuda) J Stout	3	5	0
6	(United Kingdom) B Taylor-Matthews	6	6	6
(Australia) N Howell	4	4	2
4	(United Kingdom) B Sayers	6	6	6
Q	(United Kingdom) C Braham (A)	2	0	1
3	(Australia) S Virgona	6	6	6
(France) M Sarlangue	4	1	0
8	(Australia) K Booth	6	6	6
(United Kingdom) L Danby	3	2	3
7	(Australia) C Chapman	6	6	6
(United Kingdom) R Smith	5	2	4
2	(Australia) R Fahey	6	6	6
(United Kingdom) J Lumley	5	0	2

Quarterfinals
1	(United States) C Riviere	6	3	5	6	4
5	(United States) T Chisholm	4	6	6	0	2
6	(United Kingdom) B Taylor-Matthews	5	5	6	5
4	(United Kingdom) B Sayers	6	6	3	6
3	(Australia) S Virgona	6	6	6
8	(Australia) K Booth (A)	2	2	3
7	(Australia) C Chapman	6	2	6	6
2	(Australia) R Fahey	3	6	5	4

Semifinals
1	(United States) C Riviere	6	6	6
4	(United Kingdom) B Sayers	0	2	1
2	(Australia) S Virgona	1	2	0
7	(Australia) C Chapman	6	6	2

Finals
1	(United States) C Riviere	6	6	6
7	(Australia) C Chapman	1	3	1

=== Men's Doubles Qualifying ===
==== First Qualifier ====
Final Qualifying Round
(United Kingdom) D Long (United Kingdom) C Greenhalgh	6	6
(United Kingdom) E Kay (A) (United Kingdom) S Blaber	2	2

==== Second Qualifier ====
Qualifying Round 1			Final Qualifying Round
				(United Kingdom) L Gordon (United Kingdom) T Durack	5	6	6
(United Kingdom) C Braham (A) (United Kingdom) A Williams (A)	6	6	2	(United Kingdom) C Braham (A) (United Kingdom) A Williams (A)	6	3	5
(Australia) A Fowler (United Kingdom) Z Eadle	4	1

=== Men's Doubles ===
First round
(United Kingdom) B Ronaldson (United Kingdom) A Player	1	0	3
Q	(United Kingdom) T Durack (United Kingdom) L Gordon	6	6	6
6	(United Kingdom) J Lumley (United Kingdom) B Taylor-Matthews	6	6	6
(United Kingdom) M Gooding (Australia) N Howell	1	1	2
(United Kingdom) C Fahey (United Kingdom) P Wright (A)	2	2	2
5	(Australia) K Booth (A) (United Kingdom) A Lyons	6	6	6
Q	(United Kingdom) C Greenhalgh (United Kingdom) D Long	3	6	2	6	6
(United Kingdom) W Burns (United Kingdom) J Dawes	6	4	6	4	3

Quarter-finals
1	(United States) C Riviere (United States) T Chisholm	6	6	6
Q	(United Kingdom) T Durack (United Kingdom) L Gordon	0	4	3
3	(Australia) R Fahey (Bermuda) J Stout	4	6	1	4
6	' (United Kingdom) J Lumley (United Kingdom) B Taylor-Matthews	6	4	6	6
4	(United Kingdom) B Sayers (United Kingdom) R Smith	6	6	6
5	(Australia) K Booth (A) (United Kingdom) A Lyons	0	1	2
2	(Australia) C Chapman (Australia) S Virgona	6	6	6
Q	(United Kingdom) C Greenhalgh (United Kingdom) D Long	1	1	1

Semi-finals
1	(United States) C Riviere (United States) T Chisholm	6	6	6
6	(United Kingdom) J Lumley (Australia) B Taylor-Matthews	2	0	1
4	(United Kingdom) B Sayers (United Kingdom) R Smith	6	3	6	6
2	(Australia) C Chapman (Australia) S Virgona	2	6	5	1

Final
1	(United States) C Riviere (United States) T Chisholm	5	6	6	6
4	(United Kingdom) B Sayers (United Kingdom) R Smith	6	2	4	4

=== Women's Singles Qualifying ===
==== First Qualifier ====
Final Qualifying Round
(United Kingdom) E Fleming	6	6
(United Kingdom) H Lucey	0	0

==== Second Qualifier ====
Final Qualifying Round
(United Kingdom) A Garside	6	6
(United Kingdom) L Hutchinson	0	0

==== Third Qualifier ====
Final Qualifying Round
(United Kingdom) J Garside	6	6
(United Kingdom) A Pye	0	0

==== Fourth Qualifier ====
Final Qualifying Round
(United Kingdom) I Hunt	6	6
(United Kingdom) I Candy	4	4

=== Women's Singles ===
Note: all players are amateurs

First round
(United Kingdom) E Leach	5	1
(United Kingdom) J Newby	6	6
Q	(United Kingdom) E Fleming	2	0
4	(United States) F Adam	6	6
3	(Latvia) I Dulbish	6	6
(United Kingdom) G Willis	0	4
Q	(United Kingdom) A Garside	6	6
Q	(United Kingdom) J Garside	3	5
5	(United Kingdom) T Lumley	6	6
Q	(United Kingdom) I Candy	1	0

Second round
1	(United Kingdom) S Vigrass
bye
4	(United Kingdom) J Newby	5	2
4	(United States) F Adam	6	6
3	(Latvia) I Dulbish	6	'6
(United Kingdom) A Garside	0	0
5	(United Kingdom) T Lumley	5	3
2	(United Kingdom) P Lumley	6	6

Semifinals
1	(United Kingdom) S Vigrass	6	6
4	(United States) F Adam	4	4
(Netherlands) I Dulbish	0	1
2	(United Kingdom) P Lumley	6	6

Finals
1	(United Kingdom) S Vigrass	6	6
2	(United Kingdom) P Lumley	1	4

=== Women's Doubles Qualifying ===
==== First Qualifier ====
Final Qualifying Round
(United Kingdom) A Garside (United Kingdom) J Garside	6	6
(United Kingdom) L Hutchinson (United Kingdom) R Law	0	0

=== Women's Doubles ===
Note: all players are amateurs

Quarterfinals
4	(United Kingdom) S Haswell (United Kingdom) N Doble	6
Q	(United Kingdom) A Garside (United Kingdom) J Garside	0
3	(United States) F Adam (Latvia) I Dulbish	6
(United Kingdom) I Hunt (United Kingdom) G Willis	2
(United Kingdom) E Fleming (United Kingdom) I Candy	0
2	(United Kingdom) P Lumley (United Kingdom) T Lumley	6

Semifinals
1	(United Kingdom) A Brodie (United Kingdom) S Vigrass	6
4	(United Kingdom) S Haswell (United Kingdom) N Doble	1
3	(United States) F Adam (Latvia) Irina Dulbish	6
2	(United Kingdom) P Lumley (United Kingdom) T Lumley	2

Finals
1	(United Kingdom) A Brodie (United Kingdom) S Vigrass	6
3	(United States) F Adam (Latvia) Irina Dulbish	6

== See also ==
- Grand Slam (real tennis)
