= 2022 Australian Open (real tennis) =

- Date: 3-11 January
- Edition: 90th (men); 32nd (women)
- Category: IRTPA (men); None (women)
- Draw: 15S / 8D (men); 6S / 4D (women)
- Location: Melbourne, Victoria
- Venue: Royal Melbourne Tennis Club

Champions

Men's singles
- (United Kingdom) John Lumley

Women's singles
- (Australia) Jo See Tan

Men's doubles
- (Australia) John Lumley / (Australia) Kieran Booth
← 2020 ·	Australian Open (real tennis)	· 2023 →

The 2022 Real Tennis Australian Open was the 90th edition of the Australian Open. The event was held at the Royal Melbourne Tennis Club in Melbourne between August 10–16, 2022 and was organised by the Australian Real Tennis Association, forming part of the qualifying series for the 2023 Real Tennis World Championship. It was delayed from its usual date in January due to travel restrictions and the COVID-19 pandemic. The event was the second grand slam event of the year.

The men's singles draw was won by John Lumley, his second Open title after the 2021 British Open and his first Australian Open title. Lumley also won the men's doubles draw alongside Kieran Booth, Lumley's first Australian Open doubles and Booth's first since 2014. The women's singles draw was won by Jo See Tan, her first Open singles victory. No women's doubles tournament was held due to lack of entries.

== Draw and results ==
Amateur players are marked as (A)

=== Men's singles ===
First round
(Australia) CJ White (A)	4	0	1
(United Kingdom) L Williams	6	6	6
(Australia) J Woods-Casey	6	6	6
(Australia) P Rosedale (A)	4	1	4
(Australia) A Fowler	w/o
(Australia) A Ramsay (A)

Second round
1	(United Kingdom) J Lumley	6	6	6
(United Kingdom) L Williams	4	1	0
(United Kingdom) L Gale	6	1	6	6
3	(Australia) K Booth (A)	4	6	2	1
4	(Australia) M Williams (A)	6	6	6
(Australia) J Woods-Casey	2	1	0
(Australia) A Fowler	0	2	1
2	(Australia) N Howell	6	6	6

Semifinals
1	(United Kingdom) J Lumley	4	3	6	6	6
3	(United Kingdom) K Booth (A)	6	6	0	4	2
4	(Australia) M Williams (A)	3	0	2
2	(Australia) N Howell	6	6	6

Finals
1	(United Kingdom) J Lumley	6	6	4	4	6
2	(Australia) N Howell	3	3	6	6	3

=== Men's doubles ===
Quarterfinals
(United Kingdom) L Gale (Australia) J Woods-Casey	5	6	5	6	6
(United Kingdom) L Williams (Australia) P Rosedale (A)	6	0	6	2	4
3	(Australia) D Williams (A) (Australia) M Williams (A)	6	6	6
(Australia) F Filippelli (A) (Australia) A Fowler (A)	4	4	2
(Australia) C Sievers (A) (Australia) CJ White	0	3	2
2	(Australia) N Howell (Australia) B Richardson	6	6	6

Semifinals
1	(United Kingdom) J Lumley (Australia) K Booth (A)	6	6	6
(United Kingdom) L Gale (Australia) J Woods-Casey	4	0	2
(Australia) D Williams (A) (Australia) M Williams (A)	4	5	2
2	(Australia) N Howell (Australia) B Richardson	6	6	6

Finals
1	(United Kingdom) J Lumley (Australia) K Booth (A)	6	6	6
2	(Australia) N Howell (Australia) B Richardson	0	0	2

=== Women's singles ===
Note: all players are amateurs

Finals
(Australia) JS Tan	6	6
(Australia) E Clyde	0	2

== See also ==
- Grand Slam (real tennis)
