= Bryn Sayers =

British real tennis player (born 1985)

- Full name: Bryn Sayers
- Country (sports): United Kingdom
- Residence: United Kingdom
- Born: 17 April 1985 (age 39)
- Plays: Right-handed (cross hand backhand)
- Club: Queen's Club

World Championships
- Open Singles: Final Eliminator (2012); First Round Eliminator (2010, 2014, 2018)
- Open Doubles: F (2009)

Singles
- Career titles: 2
- Current ranking: 7

Grand Slam singles results
- Australian Open: SF (2009, 2011, 2014)
- British Open: W (2012)
- French Open: SF (2008, 2009, 2010, 2011, 2012, 2023)
- US Open: W (2012)

Doubles
- Career titles: 2
- Current ranking: 9

Grand Slam doubles results
- Australian Open: SF (2011, 2014)
- French Open: W (2006)
- British Open: W (2013)
- US Open: F (2012, 2013)

Bryn Sayers (born April or August 1985) is a British professional real tennis player currently ranked at number seven in the world. He unsuccessfully challenged for the Real Tennis World Championship on four occasions, reaching the Final Eliminator in 2014 against Camden Riviere. He holds two singles Open titles, having won both in 2012. He works as the senior professional at the Queen's Club in London.

== Career ==
Sayers began playing real tennis at the Seacourt Tennis Club on Hayling Island. He was very successful in the junior ranks, winning age group championships at the British Junior Open at Queen's every year between 1996 and 2001, where he competed against future World Champion Camden Riviere. Aged 17, he entered qualifying for his first British Open in 2002, beating Ged Parsons but losing to Andrew Fowler. He won the British Under 21's Open at Middlesex University from 2003 to 2005, and was a losing finalist to Riviere in 2006. He later won the British Under 24's Open in 2008 and 2009.

Sayers toured internationally for the first time in 2004, playing the US Professional, Australian Professional and Australian Open Championships, notably beating Barry Toates in the first round of the Australian Open. He made his US Open debut in 2005, and in 2006 he partnered Riviere to reach the final of the French Open on their first attempt, losing the final to incumbent World Champion Robert Fahey and Ruaraidh Gunn. He made his British Open main draw debut later in 2006, beating Jonathan Dawes in the first round before losing to Fahey in the quarter final.

Sayers' next breakthrough would come in 2009 at the World Doubles Championship at his childhood home club of Seacourt. Partnered with Ricardo Smith, they beat Andrew Lyons and Jamie Douglas comfortably in the first round, before coming from behind to beat Camden Riviere and Nick Wood in the semi final. However, they lost in straight sets to defending champions Robert Fahey and Steve Virgona in the final.

Sayers had firmly established himself in the singles game as well, reaching the semi finals of every tournament except the British in 2009. His results earned him the right to challenge for the 2010 World Championship. In the First Round Eliminator he drew Steve Virgona. The format of the match was home and away best of 5 set matches. As the lower seed, Sayers hosted first at the Seacourt Tennis Club. The first two sets were exchanged one set each, both going to five games all. However, Virgona ran away with the next two sets to take a lead in the fixture. Heading to Virgona's home court at the Racquet Club of Philadelphia, Sayers needed to win both of the best of 5 set matches. However he lost the first in straight sets to bow out of the challenge. A week later at the Racquet and Tennis Club in New York City, Sayers beat Virgona in four sets at the US Open semi final, ultimately losing his first Open singles final to Rackets World Champion James Stout in four sets.

In 2011, Sayers was approaching the best form of his career. He reached the finals at the European Open at Lord's Cricket Ground and the IRTPA Championships at Manchester, losing to Fahey and Virgona respectively. He beat Virgona in the semi final of that year's British Open, but lost the final to Fahey in 5 sets. He and Australian amateur Kieran Booth lost the final to Fahey and Virgona that same year. At the 2012 US Open two months later, Sayers won his first Open title against Virgona in a five-set final. Later that season, he beat Fahey in four sets in the final of the British Open, his second title and his first singles victory against Fahey. He also reached the finals of the European Open, IRTPA Championships and US Pro, losing each of them to Camden Riviere.

In 2012 Sayers was again eligible to challenge for the World Championship. In the First Round Eliminator, he played Ben Taylor-Matthews in a home-and-away format. The first match was played at Taylor-Matthews chosen court of Prested Hall, which Taylor-Matthews won in four sets. Sayers needed to win both of the last two at his home court of Queen's, which he did dropping only one set. Sayers qualified into the Final Eliminator, again against Steve Virgona. The match was played at the Seacourt Tennis Club in a best of 13 set format across 3 days. Virgona won all four sets on the first day. Honours were even on the second day with each player winning two sets, but Virgona's dominance on the first day left him needing only one more on the final day to progress, which he managed on the first attempt.

2013 was not as successful for Sayers. He lost semi finals to Riviere at both the US Open and US Pro. Sayers competed in the Middlesex University British Challenge, an event designed to give British professionals experience to challenge for the World Championship, but despite being favourite he lost his semi final to Ricardo Smith. At the Doubles World Championship in Paris, Sayers and partner Booth beat the home pair of Rod McNaughtan and Matthieu Sarlangue comfortably in the quarter finals, but withdrew before the semi finals. Sayers best tournament of the year was the British Open, where he beat Fahey in 5 sets in the semi finals before losing to Virgona in 5 sets in the final. He did manage to beat both opponents in 5 sets in the doubles final, partnered with Tim Chisholm.

Sayers once again qualified for the World Championship Eliminators in 2014, where he once again drew Steve Virgona in the First Round Eliminator. The match was still home-and-away best of 5 set matches. Sayers lost his home match at Queen's in straight sets. Sayers then lost the first two matches in the away leg match at the Racquet Club of Chicago. However he rallied late, winning the next three sets, including saving two match points in the final set. Despite winning the first set of the final match, he could not hold on and was knocked out of the eliminators in four sets. The subsequent US Professional Singles at Newport would be Sayers' last match outside Europe for 8 years.

Sayers withdrew from most competitions over 2015 and 2016, playing only the British Open. Although he qualified to the 2016 World Championship Eliminators, he elected not to participate. At the 2017 British Open, he beat Fahey in the semi final to earn his first tournament final in over two years, which he lost to Riviere. Nevertheless, the World Race points made him eligible as the fourth player in the 2018 World Championship Eliminator. He played in the first round against Fahey, who had lost his championship in 2016 to Riviere. The format for the First Round Eliminators had changed to a best of 9 set match over two days at a single venue. The match was played at Queen's, a venue familiar to both players. Sayers only managed one set on each of the two days and was knocked out. His only other success in 2018 was winning the IRTPA Professional Doubles with Ben Taylor-Matthews at Prested Hall.

Sayers returned to touring play in 2021 after play resumed after the COVID-19 pandemic, playing in the US Open and US Professional Singles in 2022, bowing out to Riviere in both tournaments. With new doubles partner Ben Taylor-Matthews, Sayers reached the final of the 2021 British Open and played in World Doubles Championships in 2022 in Bordeaux and 2024 in Chicago, in both instances losing semi finals to Camden Riviere and Tim Chisholm.

== Performance timeline ==
=== Singles ===
Key
W	F	SF	QF	#R	RR	Q#	DNQ	A	NH

(W) winner; (F) finalist; (SF) semifinalist; (QF) quarterfinalist; (#R) rounds 4, 3, 2, 1; (RR) round-robin stage; (Q#) qualification round; (DNQ) did not qualify; (A) absent; (NH) not held; (SR) strike rate (events won / competed); (W–L) win–loss record.
To avoid confusion and double counting, these charts are updated at the conclusion of a tournament or when the player's participation has ended.

Current through the 2025 US Open

Tournament	2002	2003	2004	2005	2006	2007	2008	2009	2010	2011	2012	2013	2014	2015	2016	2017	2018	2019	2020	2021	2022	2023	2024	SR	W–L	Win %
World Championship
World Championship	DNQ	NH	DNQ	NH	DNQ	NH	DNQ	NH	1R	NH	2R	NH	1R	NH	DNQ	NH	1R	NH			DNQ	DNQ	NH	0 / 4	3–7	30%
Win–loss	0–0	0–0	0–0	0–0	0–0	0–0	0–0	0–0	0–2	0–0	2–2	0–0	1–2	0–0	0–0	0–0	0–1	0–0	0–0	0–0	0–0	0–0	0–0	0 / 4	3–7	30%
Grand Slam tournaments
Australian Open	A	A	QF	A	A	A	A	SF	A	SF	A	A	SF	A	A	A	A	A	A	NH	A	A	A	0 / 4	7–4	64%
British Open	Q2	A	A	A	QF	2R	2R	QF	SF	F	W	F	SF	SF	SF	F	QF	QF	NH	SF	QF	SF	A	1 / 17	31–16	66%
French Open	NH	A	A	A	1R	QF	SF	SF	SF	SF	SF	QF	QF	A	A	QF	A	1R	NH		QF	SF	A	0 / 13	17–13	57%
US Open	A	A	A	2R	2R	QF	QF	SF	F	SF	W	SF	A	A	A	A	A	A	A	A	QF	A	QF	1 / 11	19–10	66%
Win–loss	0–0	0–0	1–1	1–1	1–3	3–3	4–3	7–4	7–3	9–4	10–1	6–3	5–3	2–1	2–1	4–2	1–1	1–2	0–0	2–1	3–3	4–2	1–1	2 / 45	74–43	63%
IRTPA Sanctioned Tournaments
Champions Trophy	NH															A	A	1R	NH		QF	SF	1R	0 / 4	3–4	43%
European Open	NH			A	QF	1R	SF	SF	NH	F	F	A	NH	SF	NH									0 / 7	8–7	53%
IRTPA Championship	A	A	QF	A	2R	QF	NH	SF	SF	F	F	A	F	F	NH	A	A	F	NH					0 / 10	22–10	69%
US Pro	A	A	QF	2R	2R	QF	QF	SF	SF	SF	F	SF	QF	A	A	A	A	A	NH	A	QF	QF	QF	0 / 14	19–14	58%
Win–loss	0–0	0–0	3–2	1–1	2–3	1–3	2–2	5–3	4–2	7–3	8–3	2–1	4–2	4–2	0–0	0–0	0–0	3–2	0–0	0–0	2–2	3–2	1–2	0 / 35	52–35	60%
Career Statistics
	2002	2003	2004	2005	2006	2007	2008	2009	2010	2011	2012	2013	2014	2015	2016	2017	2018	2019	2020	2021	2022	2023	2024	Career		
Tournaments	0	0	3	2	6	6	5	7	6	7	7	4	6	3	1	2	2	4	0	1	5	4	3	Career total: 84		
Titles	0	0	0	0	0	0	0	0	0	0	2	0	0	0	0	0	0	0	0	0	0	0	0	Career total: 2		
Finals	0	0	0	0	0	0	0	0	1	3	5	1	1	1	0	1	0	1	0	0	0	0	0	Career total: 14		
Overall win–loss	0–0	0–0	4–3	2–2	3–6	4–6	6–5	12–7	11–7	16–7	20–6	8–4	10–7	6–3	2–1	4–2	1–2	4–4	0–0	2–1	5–5	7–4	2–3	129–85		60%
Win %	–	–	57%	50%	33%	40%	55%	63%	61%	70%	77%	67%	59%	67%	67%	67%	33%	50%	–	67%	50%	64%	40%	Career total: 60%		

=== Doubles ===
Tournament	2006	2007	2008	2009	2010	2011	2012	2013	2014	2015	2016	2017	2018	2019	2020	2021	2022	2023	2024	SR	W–L	Win %
World Championship
World Championship	NH	QF	NH	F	NH	DNQ	NH	SF	NH	DNQ	NH	DNQ	NH	DNQ	NH		SF	NH	SF	0 / 4	3–5	38%
Win–loss	0–0	0–1	0–0	2–2	0–0	0–0	0–0	1–0	0–0	0–0	0–0	0–0	0–0	0–0	0–0	0–0	0–2	0–0	0–0	0 / 4	3–5	38%
Grand Slam tournaments
Australian Open	A	A	A	A	NH	SF	A	A	SF	A	A	A	A	A	A	NH	A	A	A	0 / 2	4–0	100%
British Open	QF	QF	SF	SF	SF	F	F	W	F	F	F	SF	SF	SF	NH	F	F	SF	A	1 / 17	25–16	61%
French Open	F	SF	SF	QF	SF	SF	SF	NH	SF	A	A	SF	A	SF	NH		SF	SF	A	0 / 12	14–13	52%
US Open	A	QF	SF	SF	SF	SF	F	F	A	A	A	A	A	A	A	A	QF	A	QF	0 / 9	9–9	50%
Win–loss	3–2	3–3	3–4	4–3	3–3	5–3	5–3	4–1	6–2	2–1	2–1	2–2	1–1	2–2	0–0	2–1	3–3	2–2	0–1	1 / 40	52–38	58%
IRTPA Sanctioned Tournaments
IRTPA Championship	NH	SF	NH								A	SF	W	NH						1 / 3	3–2	60%
Win–loss	0–0	1–1	0–0	0–0	0–0	0–0	0–0	0–0	0–0	0–0	0–0	0–1	2–0	0–0	0–0	0–0	0–0	0–0	0–0	1 / 3	3–2	60%
Career Statistics
	2006	2007	2008	2009	2010	2011	2012	2013	2014	2015	2016	2017	2018	2019	2020	2021	2022	2023	2024	Career		
Tournaments	2	5	3	4	3	4	3	3	3	1	1	3	2	2	0	1	4	2	1	Career total: 47		
Titles	0	0	0	0	0	0	0	1	0	0	0	0	1	0	0	0	0	0	0	Career total: 2		
Finals	1	0	0	1	0	1	2	2	1	1	1	0	1	0	0	1	1	0	0	Career total: 13		
Overall win–loss	3–2	4–5	3–4	6–5	3–3	5–3	5–3	5–1	6–2	2–1	2–1	2–3	3–1	2–2	0–0	2–1	3–5	2–2	0–1	58–45		56%
Win %	60%	44%	43%	55%	50%	63%	63%	83%	75%	67%	67%	40%	75%	50%	–	67%	38%	50%	0%	Career total: 56%		
