= British Open (real tennis) =

Tournament information
- Event name: British Open
- Founded: 1931; 95 years ago
- Editions: 44
- Location: London (men); Hayling Island (women); United Kingdom
- Venue: Queen's Club (men); Seacourt Tennis Club (women)
- Category: IRTPA (men); None (women)
- Draw: 24S / 12D (men); Variable (women)

Current champions (2024)
- Men's singles: (United States) Camden Riviere
- Women's singles: (United Kingdom) Claire Fahey
- Men's doubles: (United States) Camden Riviere / (United States) Tim Chisholm
- Women's doubles: (United Kingdom) Claire Fahey / (United Kingdom) Sarah Vigrass

The British Open is a real tennis tournament, with the men's draw held annually at Queen's Club in London, England, and the women's draw held at the Seacourt Tennis Club on Hayling Island. The men's event is a national Open carrying ranking points for the Real Tennis World Championship. The women's event does not carry any ranking points.

== History ==
=== Challenge era ===
The men's event was established in 1931 as the Prince's Club shield, and was originally a challenge format with Edgar Baerlein defeating Marylebone Cricket Club professional William Groom in the inaugural edition 3 sets to 2. A second challenge was held later the same year, with E Ratcliff defeating Moreton Morrell professional Ted Johnson in the same year. The event changed to a best of 13 format in 1932 with Groom defeating Ratcliff, but losing to amateur champion Lowther Lees in 1934. Lees would hold the title until 1938 where he was defeated by Queen's Club professional Jim Dear. No challenges would be held during World War II, with Dear resigning his title in 1952. The title was picked up by rackets professional Ronald Hughes, who held it until 1967, when he retired during the challenge against Frank Willis.

Willis would battle the title against amateur Howard Angus five times during the 1970s, with Angus becoming champion in 1970. An annual doubles Open championship was first contested in 1971, first won by Ronald Hughes and Norwood Cripps. Cripps would win eleven of the first thirteen doubles championships, partnered with Hughes, Charles Swallow and Alan Lovell. In the singles, Angus won the Real Tennis World Championship in 1976, uniting the British Open and World Championships for the first time. In 1979, he was challenged for both titles by professional Chris Ronaldson, to be held at the Royal Tennis Court, Hampton Court. Ronaldson won both titles, defeating Angus 7–0, and thereafter relinquished the British Open title, allowing it to become an annual event at Queen's Club.

=== Open era ===
With the tournament now held annually, the 1980s were dominated by Chris Ronaldson winning six times between 1980 and 1985. In 1984, Ronaldson became the first player to win all four Opens in the same year - a calendar year grand slam. The era saw a rise in the number of Australian professionals travelling to participate, with Graham Hyland, Lauchlan Deuchar and Wayne Davies competing against Ronaldson in various finals, Davies taking the match to a fifth set on three occasions and Hyland once. Ronaldson's hold on the Championship was broken by Deuchar in 1986, who would go on to win a further five consecutive titles until 1991. Deuchar's dominance prevented Davies from completing a calendar year grand slam in 1988, the latter having held the three other titles that year. Davies and Deuchar won the doubles together on eight occasions, undefeated at the Open between 1984 and 1992.

A changing of the guard occurred in the early 1990s, with British amateur Julian Snow winning three titles between 1992 and 1994. The tournament saw the early rise of Robert Fahey, retiring from the 1993 final against Snow and thus failing to complete a calendar year grand slam. Fahey won his first title in 1995, but his dominance started in 2000. Fahey won eleven singles titles between 2000 and 2011, losing only the 2002 final to Tim Chisholm in five sets. He also won nine doubles titles between 2001 and 2012, missing out in 2004 and 2009. Fahey's grip on the Open title was broken by Bryn Sayers in 2012, though he would later win the 2018 as well.

The 2010s saw the rise of Camden Riviere. Riviere had reached the final in 2008, but it wouldn't be until 2014 that he would win for the first time. Riviere would be undefeated at the British Open from 2014 onwards, though he was absent in 2018 and 2021. Riviere also has been undefeated in doubles since 2013, partnered with Tim Chisholm on four occasions and John Lumley on two occasions.

== Past finals ==
=== Men's singles ===
Year	Champions	Runners-up	Score
Challenge era
1931	(United Kingdom) Edgar Baerlein	(United Kingdom) William Groom	6/2 1/6 4/6 6/5 6/1
1931	(United Kingdom) E Ratfcliff	(United Kingdom) Ted Johnson	3–1
1932	(United Kingdom) William Groom	(United Kingdom) E Ratcliff	7–1
1934	(United Kingdom) Lowther Lees	(United Kingdom) William Groom	7–1
1934	(United Kingdom) Lowther Lees	(United Kingdom) William Groom	7–2
1938	(United Kingdom) Jim Dear	(United Kingdom) Lowther Lees	5–1
1952	(United Kingdom) Ronald Hughes	(United Kingdom) Henry Johns	5–3
1962	(United Kingdom) Ronald Hughes	(United Kingdom) David Warburg	5–1
1967	(United Kingdom) Frank Willis	(United Kingdom) Ronald Hughes	4–3 ret.
1968	(United Kingdom) Frank Willis	(United Kingdom) Howard Angus	5–2
1970	(United Kingdom) Howard Angus	(United Kingdom) Frank Willis	5–2
1972	(United Kingdom) Howard Angus	(United Kingdom) Frank Willis	7–5
1975	(United Kingdom) Howard Angus	(United Kingdom) Frank Willis	7–6
1976	(United Kingdom) Howard Angus	(United Kingdom) Frank Willis	7–2
1979	(United Kingdom) Chris Ronaldson	(United Kingdom) Howard Angus	7–0
Open era
1979	(United Kingdom) Howard Angus	(United Kingdom) Chris Ronaldson	3–0
1980	(United Kingdom) Chris Ronaldson	(United Kingdom) Alan Lovell	3–0
1981	(United Kingdom) Chris Ronaldson	(Australia) Wayne Davies	3–2
1982	(United Kingdom) Chris Ronaldson	(Australia) Graham Hyland	3–2
1983	(United Kingdom) Chris Ronaldson	(Australia) Lachlan Deuchar	3–0
1984	(United Kingdom) Chris Ronaldson	(Australia) Wayne Davies	3–2
1985	(United Kingdom) Chris Ronaldson	(Australia) Wayne Davies	3–2
1986	(Australia) Lachlan Deuchar	(United Kingdom) Chris Ronaldson	3–1
1987	(Australia) Lachlan Deuchar	(Australia) Wayne Davies	3–2
1988	(Australia) Lachlan Deuchar	(United Kingdom) Chris Ronaldson	3–0
1989	(Australia) Lachlan Deuchar	(United Kingdom) Chris Ronaldson	3–0
1990	(Australia) Lachlan Deuchar	(United Kingdom) Julian Snow	3–0
1991	(Australia) Lachlan Deuchar	(Australia) Robert Fahey	3–2
1992	(United Kingdom) Julian Snow	(United Kingdom) Chris Bray	3–0
1993	(United Kingdom) Julian Snow	(Australia) Robert Fahey	0–1 ret.
1994	(United Kingdom) Julian Snow	(Australia) Lachlan Deuchar	3–1
1995	(Australia) Robert Fahey	(Australia) Lachlan Deuchar	3–0
1996	(United Kingdom) Mike Gooding	(Australia) Lachlan Deuchar	3–1
1997	(United Kingdom) Chris Bray	(Australia) Robert Fahey	3–0
1998	(United Kingdom) Julian Snow	(Australia) Steve Virgona	3–2
1999	(United Kingdom) James Male	(United Kingdom) Mike Gooding	3–1
2000	(Australia) Robert Fahey	(United Kingdom) Chris Bray	3–0
2001	(Australia) Robert Fahey	(United States) Tim Chisholm	3–1
2002	(United States) Tim Chisholm	(Australia) Robert Fahey	3–2
2003	(Australia) Robert Fahey	(United Kingdom) Ruairiadh Gunn	3–0
2004	(Australia) Robert Fahey	(United Kingdom) Ruairiadh Gunn	3–0
2005	(Australia) Robert Fahey	(United Kingdom) Ruairiadh Gunn	3–0
2006	(Australia) Robert Fahey	(Australia) Steve Virgona	3–0
2007	(Australia) Robert Fahey	(Australia) Steve Virgona	3–1
2008	(Australia) Robert Fahey	(United States) Camden Riviere	3–1
2009	(Australia) Robert Fahey	(Australia) Steve Virgona	3–1
2010	(Australia) Robert Fahey	(Australia) Steve Virgona	3–1
2011	(Australia) Robert Fahey	(United Kingdom) Bryn Sayers	3–2
2012	(United Kingdom) Bryn Sayers	(Australia) Robert Fahey	3–1
2013	(Australia) Steve Virgona	(United Kingdom) Bryn Sayers	3–2
2014	(United States) Camden Riviere	(Australia) Steve Virgona	3–2
2015	(Australia) Steve Virgona	(United States) Tim Chisholm	3–0
2016	(United States) Camden Riviere	(Australia) Chris Chapman	3–0
2017	(United States) Camden Riviere	(United Kingdom) Bryn Sayers	3–0
2018	(Australia) Robert Fahey	(Australia) Chris Chapman	3–0
2019	(United States) Camden Riviere	(Australia) Robert Fahey	3–0
2020	Not held		
2021	(United Kingdom) John Lumley	(United Kingdom) Ben Taylor-Matthews	3–1
2022	(United States) Camden Riviere	(Australia) Robert Fahey	3–0
2023	(United States) Camden Riviere	(United Kingdom) John Lumley	3–1
2024	(United States) Camden Riviere	(Australia) Nick Howell	3–1

=== Men's doubles ===
Year	Champions	Runners-up	Score
1971	(United Kingdom) Ronald Hughes / (United Kingdom) Norwood Cripps	(United Kingdom) Howard Angus / (United Kingdom) N W Smith	3–2
1972	(United Kingdom) Frank Willis / (United Kingdom) Chris Ennis	(United Kingdom) Charles Swallow / (United Kingdom) Norwood Cripps	3–0
1973	(United Kingdom) Charles Swallow / (United Kingdom) Norwood Cripps	(United Kingdom) Frank Willis / (United Kingdom) Chris Ennis	3–0
1974	(United Kingdom) Charles Swallow / (United Kingdom) Norwood Cripps	(United Kingdom) Frank Willis / (United Kingdom) Chris Ennis	3–0
1975	(United Kingdom) Charles Swallow / (United Kingdom) Norwood Cripps	(United Kingdom) Howard Angus / (United Kingdom) David Warburg	3–2
1976	(United Kingdom) Frank Willis / (United Kingdom) David Cull	(United Kingdom) Chris Ennis / (United Kingdom) Mick Dean	3–1
1977 (April)	(United Kingdom) Alan Lovell / (United Kingdom) Norwood Cripps	(United Kingdom) Frank Willis / (United Kingdom) David Cull	3–1
1977 (December)	(United Kingdom) Alan Lovell / (United Kingdom) Norwood Cripps	(United Kingdom) Frank Willis / (United Kingdom) David Cull	3–0
1978	(United Kingdom) Alan Lovell / (United Kingdom) Norwood Cripps	(United Kingdom) Chris Ronaldson / (United Kingdom) Mick Dean	3–0
1979	(United Kingdom) Alan Lovell / (United Kingdom) Norwood Cripps	(United Kingdom) Chris Ronaldson / (United Kingdom) Mick Dean	3–0
1980	(United Kingdom) Alan Lovell / (United Kingdom) Norwood Cripps	(Australia) Barry Toates / (United Kingdom) Frank Willis	3–0
1981	(United Kingdom) Chris Ronaldson / (United Kingdom) Mick Dean	(Australia) Wayne Davies / (Australia) Lauchlaan Deuchar	3–2
1982	(United Kingdom) Alan Lovell / (United Kingdom) Norwood Cripps	(United Kingdom) Chris Ronaldson / (United Kingdom) Mick Dean	3–0
1983	(United Kingdom) Chris Ronaldson / (United Kingdom) Mick Dean	(Australia) Colin Lumley / (Australia) Lachlan Deuchar	3–1
1984	(Australia) Lachlan Deuchar / (Australia) Wayne Davies	(United Kingdom) Chris Ronaldson / (United Kingdom) Mick Dean	3–1
1985	(Australia) Lachlan Deuchar / (Australia) Wayne Davies	(United Kingdom) Chris Ronaldson / (United Kingdom) Mick Dean	3–0
1986	(Australia) Lachlan Deuchar / (Australia) Wayne Davies	(United Kingdom) Chris Ronaldson / (United Kingdom) Mick Dean	3–1
1987	(Australia) Lachlan Deuchar / (Australia) Wayne Davies	(United Kingdom) Norwood Cripps / (Australia) Paul Tabley	3–1
1988	(Australia) Lachlan Deuchar / (Australia) Wayne Davies	(Australia) Jonathan Howell / (United Kingdom) Kevin Sheldon	3–0
1989	(Australia) Lachlan Deuchar / (Australia) Wayne Davies	(Australia) Jonathan Howell / (United Kingdom) Kevin Sheldon	3–0
1990	(Australia) Lachlan Deuchar / (Australia) Wayne Davies	(Australia) Robert Fahey / (Australia) Peter Meares	3–0
1991	(United Kingdom) Chris Bray / (United Kingdom) Mike Gooding	(Australia) Lachlan Deuchar / (Australia) Paul Tabley	3–2
1992	(Australia) Lachlan Deuchar / (Australia) Wayne Davies	(Australia) Frank Filippelli / (United Kingdom) James Male	w/o
1993	(United Kingdom) Chris Bray / (United Kingdom) Mike Gooding	(United Kingdom) Julian Snow / (United Kingdom) Nick Wood	3–0
1994	(United Kingdom) Chris Bray / (United Kingdom) Mike Gooding	(Australia) Lachlan Deuchar / (Australia) Wayne Davies	3–0
1995	(Australia) Robert Fahey / (Australia) Frank Filippelli	(United Kingdom) Chris Bray / (United Kingdom) Mike Gooding	3–2
1996	(United Kingdom) Chris Bray / (Australia) Mike Happell	(Australia) Lachlan Deuchar / (United Kingdom) Mike Gooding	3–2
1997	(United Kingdom) James Male / (United Kingdom) Julian Snow	(Australia) Robert Fahey / (United Kingdom) Mike Gooding	3–0
1998	(United Kingdom) James Male / (United Kingdom) Julian Snow	(United Kingdom) Ruaraidh Gunn / (Australia) Steve Virgona	3–0
1999	(United Kingdom) Ruaraidh Gunn / (Australia) Steve Virgona	(United Kingdom) Julian Snow / (United Kingdom) James Male	3–1
2000	(United Kingdom) Chris Bray / (United Kingdom) Nick Wood	(United Kingdom) Julian Snow / (United States) Tim Chisholm	3–2
2001	(Australia) Robert Fahey / (Australia) Steve Virgona	(United Kingdom) Chris Bray / (United Kingdom) James Willcocks	3–0
2002	(Australia) Robert Fahey / (Australia) Steve Virgona	(United Kingdom) Julian Snow / (United States) Tim Chisholm	3–1
2003	(Australia) Robert Fahey / (United Kingdom) Ruaraidh Gunn	(United Kingdom) Julian Snow / (United Kingdom) Adam Phillips	3–1
2004	(United Kingdom) Mike Gooding / (United Kingdom) Nick Wood	(United Kingdom) Chris Bray / (United Kingdom) James Willcocks	3–0
2005	(Australia) Robert Fahey / (United Kingdom) Ruaraidh Gunn	(Australia) Steve Virgona / (United Kingdom) David Woodman	3–0
2006	(Australia) Robert Fahey / (United Kingdom) Ruaraidh Gunn	(Australia) Steve Virgona / (United Kingdom) Jon Dawes	3–0
2007	(Australia) Robert Fahey / (United Kingdom) Ruaraidh Gunn	(Australia) Steve Virgona / (United Kingdom) James Willcocks	3–1
2008	(Australia) Robert Fahey / (United Kingdom) James Male	(United Kingdom) Nick Wood / (United States) Camden Riviere	3–1
2009	(Australia) Steve Virgona / (United Kingdom) Nick Wood	(Australia) Robert Fahey / (United Kingdom) Ruaraidh Gunn	3–0
2010	(Australia) Robert Fahey / (Australia) Steve Virgona	(United States) Tim Chisholm / (United Kingdom) Conor Medlow	3–0
2011	(Australia) Robert Fahey / (Australia) Steve Virgona	(United Kingdom) Bryn Sayers / (Australia) Kieran Booth	3–0
2012	(Australia) Robert Fahey / (Australia) Steve Virgona	(United Kingdom) Bryn Sayers / (Australia) Kieran Booth	3–0
2013	(United States) Tim Chisholm / (United Kingdom) Bryn Sayers	(Australia) Robert Fahey / (Australia) Steve Virgona	3–2
2014	(United States) Tim Chisholm / (United States) Camden Riviere	(Australia) Robert Fahey / (United Kingdom) Bryn Sayers	3–1
2015	(Australia) Steve Virgona / (Australia) Chris Chapman	(United Kingdom) Bryn Sayers / (United Kingdom) Ricardo Smith	3–1
2016	(United States) Tim Chisholm / (United States) Camden Riviere	(United Kingdom) Bryn Sayers / (United Kingdom) Ricardo Smith	3–1
2017	(United States) Tim Chisholm / (United States) Camden Riviere	(Australia) Robert Fahey / (Australia) Nick Howell	3–1
2018	(Australia) Robert Fahey / (Australia) Nick Howell	(Australia) Chris Chapman / (Australia) Steve Virgona	3–0
2019	(United States) Camden Riviere / (United Kingdom) John Lumley	(Australia) Robert Fahey / (Australia) Nick Howell	3–0
2020	Not held		
2021	(Australia) Robert Fahey / (Australia) Nick Howell	(United Kingdom) Bryn Sayers / (United Kingdom) Ben Taylor-Matthews	3–0
2022	(United States) Camden Riviere / (United Kingdom) John Lumley	(United States) Tim Chisholm / (United Kingdom) Bryn Sayers	3–1
2023	(United States) Tim Chisholm / (United States) Camden Riviere	(Australia) Robert Fahey / (Australia) Nick Howell	3–0
2024	(United States) Tim Chisholm / (United States) Camden Riviere	(Australia) Nick Howell / (United Kingdom) Leon Smart	3–0
