= Jackie Carter =

African-American editor and writer (1953–2016)

- Born: June 28, 1953; Port Chester, New York, U.S.
- Died: April 13, 2016 (aged 62); New York City, U.S.
- Occupation: Children's literature
- Education: Hampton University; New York University (MS)
- Parents: William A. Carter; Earnestine Carter

Jackie Carter (June 28, 1953 – April 13, 2016) was an American children's author. Her goal was to provide children of all races with images of themselves in the books they read.

== Early life and education ==
Carter was born on June 28, 1953, in Port Chester, New York. Both of her parents, William A. Carter and Earnestine Carter, were employees of the Middletown school district, and her father was the first African-American school principal there. Carter obtained a degree in early childhood education from Hampton University and a Master of Science in Educational Instructional Technology from New York University.

== Career ==
Her first position in publishing was on Sesame Street Magazine, after which she joined Scholastic Corporation as editorial director of the early childhood division in 1985. Carter was named Editorial Director of Weston Woods/Scholastic New Media, which produced audiovisual works, in 1995.

Among the positions she held in children's publishing were VP of Marvel Kids in 1997 and Editorial Director of Disney Global Children's Book Division. At Disney Carter was also Editorial Director of Jump at the Sun, an imprint highlighting African American culture. The imprint included Whoopi Goldberg's Sugar Plum Ballerina series, as well as the Willimena series by Valerie Wilson Wesley.

In 2004 she became vice president and publisher of Children's Press at the Scholastic Classroom and Library Group. She also participated in a reading and writing program at the University of Illinois at Chicago aimed at encouraging African-American boys to build self-esteem.

== Bibliography ==
- Levin, James, and Jackie Carter. Helping. New York: Scholastic, 1993. ISBN 9780590727754
- Carter, Jackie, and Nancy Poydar. Knock, Knock! New York, NY: Scholastic, 1993. ISBN 9780590727839
- Carter, Jackie, and James Young. One Night. New York: Scholastic, 1994. ISBN 9780590275651

== Illness and death ==
Carter was diagnosed with Non-Hodgkin lymphoma in 2002, and died in Manhattan April 13, 2016. On learning that she had cancer she developed a photographic exhibit with Martin Mistretta at the Creative Arts Center for People with Cancer, in Manhattan, called The It Girl's Guide to Chemo.
