= Alan Lovell =

British businessman (born 1953)

Alan Lovell DL
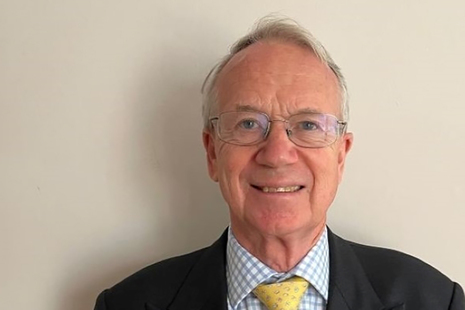
- Born: Alan Charles Lovell; 19 November 1953 (age 72); United Kingdom
- Education: Winchester College
- Alma mater: Jesus College, Oxford
- Occupation: Businessman
- Title: Former CEO, Costain, Jarvis plc, Dunlop Slazenger and Infinis
- Board member of: Safestyle, SIG, Amey, Interserve
- Spouse: Virginia Weatherill
- Children: 3
- Relatives: Bernard Weatherill (father-in-law)

Alan Charles Lovell DL (born 19 November 1953) is a British businessman, formerly chief executive of the British construction company Costain, and currently chairman of the Environment Agency and British Steel.

== Early life ==
Lovell is the son of a farmer, and was educated at Winchester College, followed by a degree in classics from Jesus College, Oxford.

== Career ==
He trained as an accountant with PricewaterhouseCoopers from 1976 to 1980, where he was seconded to the City merchant bank Kleinwort Benson, and then worked for the electronics company Plessey from 1980 to 1989.

In 1989, Lovell joined Conder Group, a construction company, as finance director, rising to CEO, but it collapsed in September 1992. He was finance director of Costain from 1992 to 1995, and its CEO from 1995 to 1997, after which he was FD and CEO of Dunlop Slazenger, and then CEO of Jarvis plc. In July 2006, he was appointed as CEO of Infinis, which then claimed to be the UK's largest independent solely renewable power company.

In November 2017, Lovell joined Carillion as a non-executive director, and was described as a "veteran turnaround specialist", a "turnaround expert" and a "company doctor". Carillion went into liquidation in January 2018.

In July 2019, Lovell was appointed chairman of the financially troubled Interserve group.

Lovell has been chairman of Safestyle UK and of the Association of Lloyd's Members. He is a non-executive director and senior independent director of SIG plc. In 2022, he became chairman of the Environment Agency. In September 2026, he was appointed chairman of British Steel.

Lovell was High Sheriff of Hampshire 2010–11. He is a deputy lieutenant of Hampshire, former chairman of the Mary Rose Trust and former chairman of the board of governors of Winchester University. He is a Lay Canon and Senior Non Executive Member of Chapter at Winchester Cathedral.

== Personal life ==
Lovell is married to Virginia Weatherill (born 1955), daughter of the former House of Commons speaker Bernard Weatherill, and they have three daughters.

He has a longstanding interest in tennis, real tennis and rackets from his schooldays, and was head of the UK's real tennis association in Britain for 13 years.
