= Tim Chisholm =

American tennis player

- Full name: Tim Chisholm
- Country (sports): United States
- Residence: United States
- Born: 31 October 1969 (age 55)
- Plays: Right-handed
- Club: Tuxedo Club, Tuxedo Park, New York

World Championships
- Open Singles: Challenger (2002, 2004, 2006)
- Open Doubles: W (2001, 2015, 2017, 2019, 2022, 2024)

Singles
- Career titles: 5
- Current ranking: 15

Grand Slam singles results
- Australian Open: W (2003)
- British Open: W (2002)
- French Open: W (2003)
- US Open: W (2003, 2004)

Doubles
- Career titles: 26
- Current ranking: 6

Grand Slam doubles results
- Australian Open: W (2017, 2019)
- French Open: W (2011, 2012, 2014, 2015, 2017)
- British Open: W (2013, 2014, 2016, 2017, 2023)
- US Open: W (2004, 2006, 2012, 2013, 2014, 2015, 2016, 2017, 2019, 2020, 2021, 2022, 2023, 2024)

Tim Chisholm (born October 31, 1969) is a semi-retired American real tennis player. He is Racquets Director at The Tuxedo Club in Tuxedo Park, New York.

== Career ==
A former lawn tennis player, Chisholm switched to the original game of tennis around the year 2000. He became the head professional at the Racquet and Tennis Club in New York City. In 2001, he won the first World Doubles Championship, partnered by Julian Snow. Although technically not a Grand Slam, at one point in 2003 Chisholm held all four major open titles at the same time.

Chisholm challenged former World Champion Robert Fahey three times for the singles title. The 2002 challenge was the closest, going the full 13 sets. In 2004, Chisholm lost the challenge 7–1 sets. He then retired as head professional at the Racquet Club and took an office job in Boston, Massachusetts, only playing in American tournaments. In January 2006, he decided to attempt the World Challenge again, and although he won his preliminary matches handily, he fell to Fahey 7–0 in the championship.

On June 7, 2015, Chisholm and doubles partner Camden Riviere defeated World Doubles champions, Australians Robert Fahey and Steve Virgona.

== Personal life ==
Chisholm is married to Darcey and they have three children.

== Singles titles ==
- Australian Open: 2003
- British Open: 2002
- French Open: 2003
- U.S. Open: 2003, 2004
- Schochet Cup (formerly U.S. Professional): 2002

== See also ==
- List of real tennis world champions
