= Robert Fahey =

Australian real tennis player

- Full name: Robert Leo Fahey
- Country (sports): Australia
- Residence: United Kingdom
- Born: 30 April 1968 (age 58)
- Turned pro: 1987
- Plays: Right-handed
- Club: Oratory School, Woodcote, Berkshire

World Championships
- Open Singles: W (1994, 1995, 1996, 1998, 2000, 2002, 2004, 2006, 2008, 2010, 2012, 2014, 2018)
- Open Doubles: W (2003, 2005, 2007, 2009, 2011, 2013)

Singles
- Career titles: 51
- Highest ranking: 1
- Current ranking: 5

Grand Slam singles results
- Australian Open: W (1993, 1994, 1996, 1997, 1998, 2000, 2001, 2002, 2004, 2008, 2009, 2012, 2014, 2016, 2018)
- British Open: W (1995, 2000, 2001, 2003, 2004, 2005, 2006, 2007, 2008, 2009, 2010, 2011, 2018)
- French Open: W (1993, 1998, 1999, 2000, 2001, 2004, 2005, 2006, 2007, 2008, 2009, 2010, 2011, 2015)
- US Open: W (2000, 2001, 2002, 2005, 2006, 2007, 2008)

Doubles
- Career titles: 41
- Highest ranking: 1
- Current ranking: 7

Grand Slam doubles results
- Australian Open: W (1992, 1994, 1996, 1997, 2000, 2001, 2002, 2004, 2008, 2009, 2010, 2011, 2012, 2016, 2018)
- French Open: W (1999, 2006, 2009, 2010, 2015)
- British Open: W (1995, 2001, 2002, 2003, 2005, 2006, 2007, 2008, 2010, 2011, 2012, 2018, 2021)
- US Open: W (1990, 1992, 1993, 2005, 2007, 2008, 2011, 2018)

Robert Leo Fahey MBE OAM (born 30 April 1968, in Hobart, Tasmania), nicknamed "Bag", is an Australian real tennis player and the former World Champion of the sport, holding the title from 16 March 1994 to 21 May 2016 and again from 28 April 2018 to September 2022.

== Career ==
On 27 April 2006, at the Oratory Tennis Club in Woodcote, South Oxfordshire, he matched the great Pierre Etchebaster's feat of seven consecutive defenses of the real tennis singles World Championship. The defence was against Tim Chisholm in the latter's third consecutive challenge. In May 2008 he again successfully defended his title, thus breaking Etchebaster's record, against Camden Riviere on the historic court at Fontainebleau Palace, France, winning 7 sets to 5 (6/1 3/6 5/6 6/4, 6/2 6/3 5/6 6/0, 6/1 2/6 1/6 6/5). In May 2010 he retained his title for a record ninth time, defeating Steve Virgona 7 sets to 2. In April 2012 he retained his title for the 10th consecutive time, again defeating Steve Virgona 7 sets to 3 (6/5 3/6 6/1 6/3 6/4 6/3 3/6 5/6 6/2 6/3). He successfully defended his title in May 2014, at the Royal Melbourne Tennis Club, for the eleventh time, defeating Camden Riviere seven sets to three.

Fahey was finally defeated in the 2016 Real Tennis World Championship, by Camden Riviere by 7 sets to 2, at the National Tennis Club in Newport, Rhode Island (Riviere's home court).

Fahey regained the World Championship singles title on 28 April 2018, defeating Camden Riviere by 7 sets to 5, at The Queen's Club, London.

In 2000 and 2001 he won back-to-back Grand Slams, and a third in 2008. In 2003 (Hobart), partnered with Steve Virgona, he won the World Doubles Championship; the pair successfully defended the title in 2005 (Fontainebleau), 2007 (Boston), 2009 (Seacourt - Hayling Island) and 2011 (RMTC - Melbourne).

A portrait of Fahey by Rupert Alexander was shortlisted for the BP Portrait Award 2012.

Fahey was appointed Member of the Order of the British Empire (MBE) in the 2017 British New Year Honours for services to sport.

In the 2019 Australian Queen's Birthday Honours List Fahey was awarded the Medal of the Order of Australia (OAM) for service to Real Tennis.

Fahey announced his retirement from competitive Real Tennis following his loss to Camden Riviere in the 2022 World Championship final. He would later play in the 2022 British Open, and announced his retirement from singles following another final defeat against Riviere. He returned to playing singles at the 2024 US Open and has been active since.

== Singles titles ==
- World Champion: 1994, 1995, 1996, 1998, 2000, 2002, 2004, 2006, 2008, 2010, 2012, 2014, 2018 (since 1996 played on even years only)
- Australian Open: 1993, 1994, 1996, 1997, 1998, 2000, 2001, 2002, 2004, 2008, 2009, 2012, 2014, 2016
- British Open: 1995, 2000, 2001, 2003, 2005, 2006, 2007, 2008, 2009, 2010, 2011, 2018
- French Open: 1993, 1998, 1999, 2000, 2001, 2004, 2005, 2006, 2007, 2008, 2009, 2010, 2011, 2015
- U.S. Open: 1993, 2000, 2001, 2002, 2005, 2006, 2007, 2008, 2009
- IRTPA Championships (formerly UK Professional): 2001, 2002, 2003, 2004, 2007, 2009, 2010, 2015
- U.S. Professional / Schochet Cup: 2001, 2003, 2004, 2005, 2006, 2007, 2008, 2009, 2025
- European Open: 2005, 2006, 2007, 2011, 2015

== Personal life ==
He is married to fellow real tennis player Claire Fahey and they have two children.

== See also ==
- List of real tennis world champions
