= 2025 Ladies Real Tennis World Championships =

- Date: 24-31 May, 2025
- Edition: 21st
- Draw: 12S / 4D
- Location: Newport, Rhode Island
- Venue: International Tennis Hall of Fame

Champions

Women's singles
- (United Kingdom) Claire Fahey

Women's doubles
- (United Kingdom) Claire Fahey / (United Kingdom) Tara Lumley
- Real Tennis World Championship

The 2025 Ladies Real Tennis World Championships was the 21st edition of the biennial Ladies Real Tennis World Championships, held at International Tennis Hall of Fame in Newport, Rhode Island in May 2025. It was the first time the event was held in the United States since 2017 as the event follows a rotation through the four tennis-playing countries. The singles event was successfully defended by World Champion Claire Fahey, recording her eighth consecutive victory in the event. The event will be held at the same venue as the Men's World Championship for the first time, albeit not at the same time of year.

== Format ==
The Ladies World Championship followed a new format in 2025. Through the previous 20 editions, both the singles and doubles draws were held as Open draws, with all female real tennis players eligible. In 2025, the singles draw was restricted to the top 6 players, with at most 8 players entering through qualifying for 2 places.

Players were seeded by handicap, with the defending champion automatically receiving a bye to the singles final. The second ranked player overall received a bye to the semi final. Up to 8 players will compete for two qualifying places. The singles final was played as a best-of-5 set match for the first time.

== Qualification ==
The top 4 available players qualified directly to the main draw. The four direct qualifiers were confirmed in February 2025 as Claire Fahey, Lea Van Der Zwalmen, Tara Lumley and Saskia Bollerman. As defending champion, Fahey qualified directly to the final, while Van Der Zwalmen qualified directly to the semi final as the next best ranked player. World numbers three and four, Bollerman and Lumley entered the main draw directly. A qualification tournament will be held among the seven entered players for the remaining two places. There is no qualification event for the doubles, with the top four pairs entering straight into the semi finals.

=== Qualifier 1 ===
Semifinals
May 24
(United States) Kadi Meldrum	2	6	2
(Australia) Xanthe Ranger	6	3	6

Final
May 25
(United Kingdom) Nicola Doble	6	6
(Australia) Xanthe Ranger	2	5

=== Qualifier 2 ===
Semifinals
May 24
(United Kingdom) Jess Garside	6	6
(United States) Claire Voegele	1	0
(France) Margaux Randjbar	0	0
(Australia) Jo See Tan	6	6

Final
May 25
(United Kingdom) Jess Garside	6	6
(Australia) Jo See Tan	1	4

== Results ==
The schedule for the main draw matches and the identities of the top four seeds was confirmed by the organising committee in February 2025.

=== Singles ===
Round 1
May 26
3	(United Kingdom) Tara Lumley	6	6
Q	(United Kingdom) Jess Garside	2	2
Q	(United Kingdom) Nicola Doble	6	0	3
4	(Netherlands) Saskia Bollerman	3	6	6

Quarterfinals
May 27
4	(United Kingdom) Tara Lumley	6	3	6
3	(Netherlands) Saskia Bollerman	2	6	3

Semifinals
May 28
2	(France) Lea Van Der Zwalmen	6	6
3	(United Kingdom) Tara Lumley	0	2

Final
May 30
1	(United Kingdom) Claire Fahey	6	6	6
2	(France) Lea Van Der Zwalmen	0	2	0

=== Doubles ===
Semifinals
May 29
1	(United Kingdom) Claire Fahey (United Kingdom) Tara Lumley	6	6
4	(Australia) Jo See Tan (United Kingdom) Jess Garside	1	0
3	(United Kingdom) Nicola Doble (Netherlands) Saskia Bollerman	2	3
2	(France) Lea Van Der Zwalmen (France) Margaux Randjbar	6	6

Final
May 31
1	(United Kingdom) Claire Fahey (United Kingdom) Tara Lumley	6	6	6
2	(France) Lea Van Der Zwalmen (France) Margaux Randjbar	2	4	3

Preceded by Oratory; 2023	Ladies Real Tennis World Championship; Newport; 2025	Succeeded by TBC; 2027
