= 2025 US Open (court tennis) =

- Date: February 20 – March 2 (men); February 7–9 (women)
- Edition: 75th (men); 40th (women)
- Category: IRTPA (men); None (women)
- Draw: 16S / 12D (men); 19S / 12D (women)
- Location: Vienna, Virginia (men); Philadelphia, Pennsylvania (women)
- Venue: Westwood Country Club (men); Racquet Club of Philadelphia (women)

Champions

Men's singles
- (United Kingdom) John Lumley

Women's singles
- (United Kingdom) Claire Fahey

Men's doubles
- (United States) Tim Chisholm / (United States) Camden Riviere

Women's doubles
- (France) Lea Van Der Zwalmen / (United States) Annie Clark
| ← 2024 · | US Open (court tennis) | · 2026 → |

The 2025 court tennis US Open was the 75th edition of the US Open. The men's event was held at the Westwood Country Club from February 20 to March 2, 2025, and was organized by the United States Court Tennis Association, forming part of the qualifying series for the 2027 Real Tennis World Championship. It was the first time the event will be held in Washington. The women's event was held at the Racquet Club of Philadelphia from February 7 to 9, 2025. It was the second grand slam event of the year.

The tournament was won by second seed John Lumley. It was his first US Open title, marking the fourth of his career. He defeated incumbent World Champion Camden Riviere in the final. It was the first time that Riviere has been defeated in any Open competition since 2013, and Lumley's first victory over Riviere in a best of 5 set match. It also breaks Riviere's 12 year run as US Open champion. Lumley saved three match points in his semi final against Robert Fahey. Riviere won the doubles title alongside Tim Chisholm, having won the previous 12 editions. They defeated Lumley and Steve Virgona in the final.

The women's singles draw was won by defended by incumbent World Champion and defending champion Claire Fahey. It was her eleventh US Open singles victory and her fifth consecutive victory (excepting the two editions not held due to the COVID-19 pandemic). The doubles draw was won by Lea Van Der Zwalmen and Annie Clark. They beat Fahey and Jo See Tan in the final. It was Van Der Zwalmen’s second Open doubles victory following the 2022 French Open, while Clark was playing in the first Open of her career. It was the second time Fahey had been defeated in doubles since 2011.

== Draw and results ==
Amateur players are marked as (A)

=== Men's Singles Qualifying ===
==== First Qualifier ====
First Round
(United States) P Dickinson | 0 | 1
(United Kingdom) T Hollins | 6 | 6
7 | (United Kingdom) L Gordon | 3 | 6 | 6
(United Kingdom) M Trueman | 6 | 3 | 5
(United Kingdom) W Flynn (A) | 4 | 3
3 | (United States) F Bristowe (A) | 6 | 6

Second Round
1 | (Australia) J Woods-Casey | 6 | 5 | 6
(United Kingdom) T Hollins | 4 | 6 | 3
7 | (United Kingdom) L Gordon | 3 | 1
3 | (United States) F Bristowe (A) | 6 | 6

Third Round
1 | (Australia) J Woods-Casey | 2 | 3
3 | (United States) F Bristowe (A) | 6 | 6

==== Second Qualifier ====
First Round
4 | (United Kingdom) B Vallat (A) | 6 | 6
(United Kingdom) A Player | 3 | 2
(United States) E Barker (A) | 1 | 3
6 | (United States) N Motz (A) | 6 | 6
5 | (United Kingdom) V Hamilton | w/o
(United States) H Smith (A)

Second Round
4 | (United Kingdom) B Vallat (A) | 1 | 0
6 | (United States) N Motz (A) | 6 | 6
5 | (United Kingdom) V Hamilton | 6 | 5 | 6
2 | (Australia) O Pridmore (A) | 3 | 6 | 3

Third Round
6 | (United States) N Motz (A) | 6 | 6
5 | (United Kingdom) V Hamilton | 5 | 5

=== Men's Singles ===
First round
1 | (United States) C Riviere | 6 | 6 | 6
Q2 | (United States) N Motz (A) | 1 | 0 | 1
(United Kingdom) L Williams | 1 | 3 | 3
6 | (Australia) S Virgona | 6 | 6 | 6
7 | (United Kingdom) L Smart | 6 | 6 | 5 | 6
(United States) B Tanfield | 4 | 2 | 6 | 5
Q1 | (United States) F Bristowe (A) | 1 | 0 | 6 | 2
4 | (United Kingdom) B Taylor-Matthews | 6 | 6 | 2 | 6
3 | (Australia) N Howell | 6 | 6 | 6
(United Kingdom) D Long | 1 | 0 | 1
(United States) T Chisholm | 6 | 6 | 1 | 4 | 0
5 | (Australia) R Fahey | 4 | 5 | 6 | 6 | 6
8 | (United Kingdom) R Shenkman (A) | 6 | 6 | 6
(United Kingdom) N Merola | 0 | 4 | 0
(United Kingdom) J Dodgson | 0 | 3 | 0
2 | (United Kingdom) J Lumley | 6 | 6 | 6

Quarter-finals
1 | (United States) C Riviere | 6 | 6 | 6
6 | (Australia) S Virgona | 2 | 1 | 3
7 | (United Kingdom) L Smart | 3 | 1 | 4
4 | (United Kingdom) B Taylor-Matthews | 6 | 6 | 6
3 | (Australia) N Howell | 2 | 6 | 2 | 1
5 | (Australia) R Fahey | 6 | 2 | 6 | 6
8 | (United Kingdom) R Shenkman (A) | 5 | 2 | 1
2 | (United Kingdom) J Lumley | 6 | 6 | 6

Semi-finals
1 | (United States) C Riviere | 6 | 6 | 6
4 | (United Kingdom) B Taylor-Matthews | 1 | 0 | 2
5 | (Australia) R Fahey | 1 | 6 | 3 | 6 | 5
2 | (United Kingdom) J Lumley | 6 | 1 | 6 | 3 | 6

Final
1 | (United States) C Riviere | 6 | 6 | 5 | 1 | 4
2 | (United Kingdom) J Lumley | 4 | 3 | 6 | 6 | 6

=== Men's Doubles Qualifying ===
==== First qualifier ====
| First Qualifying Round | | | | Final Qualifying Round |
| | | | | 1 | (United States) E Barker (A) (United States) N Motz (A) | 6 | 1 | 3 |
| 1 | (United States) P Dickinson (A) (United States) H Smith (A) | 4 | 0 | | (United Kingdom) M Trueman (United States) C Motz (A) | 3 | 6 | 6 |
| | (United Kingdom) M Trueman (United States) C Motz (A) | 6 | 6 |

==== Second qualifier ====
| Final Qualifying Round |
| | (United Kingdom) A Player (United Kingdom) T Hollins | 6 | 0 | 4 |
| 2 | (United Kingdom) B Vallat (A) (United States) D McBride (A) | 4 | 6 | 6 |

=== Men's Doubles ===
First round
(United Kingdom) R Shenkman (A) (United Kingdom) L Gordon | 6 | 6 | 3 | 6
(Australia) J Woods-Casey (United Kingdom) V Hamilton | 2 | 4 | 6 | 2
6 | (United Kingdom) L Williams (United Kingdom) D Long | 6 | 6 | 6
Q2 | (United Kingdom) B Vallat (United States) D McBride | 2 | 2 | 2
(United Kingdom) W Flynn (A) (Australia) O Pridmore (A) | 2 | 6 | 5 | 5
5 | (United Kingdom) L Smart (United Kingdom) J Dodgson | 6 | 1 | 6 | 6
(United States) F Bristowe (A) (United States) B Tanfield | 6 | 6 | 6
Q1 | (United Kingdom) M Trueman (United States) C Motz (A) | 2 | 2 | 1

Quarter-finals
1 | (United States) T Chisholm (United States) C Riviere | 6 | 6 | 6
(United Kingdom) R Shenkman (A) (United Kingdom) L Gordon | 1 | 1 | 3
4 | (United Kingdom) B Taylor-Matthews (United Kingdom) N Merola | 6 | 6 | 6
6 | (United Kingdom) L Williams (United Kingdom) D Long | 5 | 3 | 2
3 | (Australia) R Fahey (Australia) N Howell | w/o
5 | (United Kingdom) L Smart (United Kingdom) J Dodgson
2 | (United Kingdom) J Lumley (Australia) S Virgona | 6 | 3 | 6 | 4 | 6
(United States) F Bristowe (A) (United States) B Tanfield | 2 | 6 | 3 | 6 | 1

Semi-finals
1 | (United States) T Chisholm (United States) C Riviere | 6 | 6 | 6
4 | (United Kingdom) B Taylor-Matthews (United Kingdom) N Merola | 3 | 1 | 4
3 | (Australia) R Fahey (Australia) N Howell | 4 | 6 | 6 | 6
2 | (United Kingdom) J Lumley (Australia) S Virgona | 6 | 5 | 0 | 1

Final
1 | (United States) T Chisholm (United States) C Riviere | 6 | 5 | 6 | 6
2 | (United Kingdom) J Lumley (Australia) S Virgona | 1 | 6 | 4 | 2

=== Women's Singles Qualifying ===
| Final Qualifying Round |
| (United States) P Person | 6 | 4 | 5 |
| (United States) B Winthrop | 2 | 6 | 6 |

| Final Qualifying Round |
| (United States) K Patrick | 6 | 6 |
| (United States) S Dannelly | 0 | 0 |

| Final Qualifying Round |
| (United States) L Browning | 3 | 2 |
| (United States) A Fitz-Patrick | 6 | 6 |

| Final Qualifying Round |
| (United States) A Dorr | 6 | 6 |
| (United States) S Stanley | 0 | 0 |

| Final Qualifying Round |
| (United States) C Voegele | 6 | 6 |
| (United States) S Alderman | 2 | 3 |

=== Women's Singles ===
Note: all players are amateurs except Claire Fahey

First round
Q | (United States) B Winthrop | 1 | 0
5 | (United States) V Scott | 6 | 6
Q | (United States) K Patrick | 0 | 0
8 | (United States) L Gephart | 6 | 6
Q | (United States) A Fitz-Patrick | 0 | 0
3 | (Australia) JS Tan | 6 | 6
4 | (United States) A Clark | 6 | 6
Q | (United States) A Dorr | 4 | 5
(United States) T Browne | 1 | 3
6 | (United States) K Meldrum | 6 | 6
Q | (United States) C Voegele | 4 | 3
7 | (United States) A Wintersteen | 6 | 6

Second round
1 | (United Kingdom) C Fahey | 6 | 6
5 | (United States) V Scott | 1 | 0
8 | (United States) L Gephart | 1 | 0
3 | (Australia) JS Tan | 6 | 6
4 | (United States) A Clark | 6 | 6
6 | (United States) K Meldrum | 2 | 2
7 | (United States) A Wintersteen | 0 | 0
2 | (France) L Van Der Zwalmen | 6 | 6

Semifinals
1 | (United Kingdom) C Fahey | 6 | 6
3 | (Australia) JS Tan | 0 | 0
4 | (United States) A Clark | 0 | 0
2 | (France) L Van Der Zwalmen | 6 | 6

Finals
1 | (United Kingdom) C Fahey | 6 | 6
2 | (France) L Van Der Zwalmen | 4 | 0

=== Women's Doubles ===
Note: all players are amateurs except Claire Fahey

First round
(United States) P Person (United States) S Crowell | 4 | 2
(United States) B Winthrop (United States) N Shiland | 6 | 6
5 | (United States) A Wintersteen (United States) S Stanley | 6 | 6
(United States) K Patrick (United States) J Nolan | 1 | 0
(United States) S Dannelly (United States) H Pallis | 0 | 0
6 | (United States) L Gephart (United States) B Wakim | 6 | 6
(United States) T Browne (United States) A Fitz-Patrick | 6 | 6
(United States) L Browning (United States) S Alderman | 2 | 5

Quarter-finals
1 | (United Kingdom) C Fahey (Australia) JS Tan | 6 | 6
(United States) B Winthrop (United States) N Shiland | 0 | 0
4 | (United States) A Dorr (United States) V Scott | 6 | 6
5 | (United States) A Wintersteen (United States) S Stanley | 1 | 0
3 | (United States) K Meldrum (United States) C Voegele | 6 | 2 | 6
6 | (United States) L Gephart (United States) B Wakim | 1 | 6 | 0
2 | (France) L Van Der Zwalmen (United States) A Clark | 6 | 6
(United States) T Browne (United States) A Fitz-Patrick | 0 | 0

Semi-finals
1 | (United Kingdom) C Fahey (Australia) JS Tan | 6 | 6
4 | (United States) A Dorr (United States) V Scott | 1 | 0
3 | (United States) K Meldrum (United States) C Voegele | 1 | 0
2 | (France) L Van Der Zwalmen (United States) A Clark | 6 | 6

Final
1 | (United Kingdom) C Fahey (Australia) JS Tan | 4 | 6 | 2
2 | (France) L Van Der Zwalmen (United States) A Clark | 6 | 3 | 6

== See also ==
- Grand Slam (real tennis)
