= 2023 US Open (court tennis) =

- Date: 20-29 February (men); 17–19 May (women)
- Edition: 73rd (men); 39th (women)
- Category: IRTPA (men); None (women)
- Draw: 16S / 12D (men); 12S / 8D (women)
- Location: Boston, Massachusetts (men); McLean, Virginia (women)
- Venue: Tennis and Racquet Club (men); International Tennis Club of Washington (women)

Champions

Men's singles
- (United States) Camden Riviere

Women's singles
- (United Kingdom) Claire Fahey

Men's doubles
- (United States) Tim Chisholm / (United States) Camden Riviere

Women's doubles
- (United Kingdom) Claire Fahey / (United Kingdom) Penny Lumley
← 2022 ·	US Open (court tennis)	· 2024 →

The 2023 Court Tennis US Open was the 73rd edition of the US Open. The men's event was held at the Tennis and Racquet Club in Boston, Massachusetts between February 23-March 2, 2023 and was organised by the United States Court Tennis Association, forming part of the qualifying series for the 2025 Real Tennis World Championship. The women's event was held at the International Tennis Club of Washington at Westwood Country Club in McLean, Virginia between May 19–23, 2024. The men's draw was the second grand slam event of the year.

The men's singles draw was won by incumbent World Champion Camden Riviere for the 11th consecutive time. Riviere also won the men's doubles draw alongside Tim Chisholm, their 11th US Open title as a pairing. The women's singles draw was won by incumbent World Champion Claire Fahey, her 8th US Open singles victory and her third consecutive victory (excepting the two editions not held due to the COVID-19 pandemic. She also won the doubles draw with Penny Lumley, their first victory in their first tournament as a pairing.

== Draw and results ==
Amateur players are marked as (A)

=== Men's Singles Qualifying ===
==== First Qualifier ====
First Round				Second Round				Third Round
				1	(United Kingdom) J Smith	6	6
(United States) A Peabody (A)	4	6	6		(United States) A Peabody (A)	2	3
(United States) R Bolling	6	3	0					1	(United Kingdom) J Smith	5	5
								4	(United Kingdom) Z Eadle	6	6
					(United States) B Hudson (A)	3	3
				4	(United Kingdom) Z Eadle	6	6

==== Second Qualifier ====
Second Round					Third Round
3	(Australia) J Woods-Casey	3	6	6
	(United Kingdom) N Merola	6	6	5	3	(Australia) J Woods-Casey	1	5
	(United States) H Smith (A)	4	4		2	(United Kingdom) T Hollins	6	6
2	(United Kingdom) T Hollins	6	6

=== Men's Singles ===
First round
1	(United States) C Riviere	6	6	6
(United States) F Bristowe (A)	1	0	3
(United Kingdom) J Dodgson	5	5	1
5	(United Kingdom) L Smart	6	6	6
6	(Australia) S Virgona	6	6	6
(United Kingdom) L Williams	0	2	1
Q	(United Kingdom) Z Eadle	1	1	0
3	(Australia) N Howell	6	6	6
4	(United Kingdom) B Taylor-Matthews	6	6	6
(United States) B Tanfield	4	2	1
(United Kingdom) R Shenkman (A)	6	3	6	6
7	(United Kingdom) D Long	2	6	4	4
8	(France) M Sarlangue (A)	6	6	6
(United States) T Chisholm	1	5	3
Q	(United Kingdom) T Hollins	0	1	0
2	(United Kingdom) J Lumley	6	6	6

Quarter-finals
1	(United States) C Riviere	6	6	6
5	(United Kingdom) L Smart	0	0	1
6	(Australia) S Virgona	6	6	4	6
3	(Australia) N Howell	0	5	6	5
3	(United Kingdom) B Taylor-Matthews	6	6	6
(United Kingdom) R Shenkman (A)	2	2	4
8	(France) M Sarlangue (A)	0	3	1
2	(United Kingdom) J Lumley	6	6	6

Semi-finals
1	(United States) C Riviere	6	6	6
6	(Australia) S Virgona	2	1	3
4	(United Kingdom) B Taylor-Matthews	6	2	4	2
2	(United Kingdom) J Lumley	4	6	6	6

Final
1	(United States) C Riviere	6	6	1	6
2	(United Kingdom) J Lumley	1	2	6	2

=== Men's Doubles ===
First round
(United Kingdom) T Hollins (United Kingdom) Z Eadle	4	6	3	2
(United States) B Tanfield (United States) F Bristowe (A)	6	4	6	6
(United Kingdom) L Williams (United Kingdom) N Merola	6	6	6
(United States) B Hudson (A) (United States) A Peabody (A)	1	2	4

Second round
1	(United States) C Riviere (United States) T Chisholm	6	4	6	6
(United States) B Tanfield (United Kingdom) F Bristowe (A)	2	6	1	2
(United Kingdom) L Williams (United Kingdom) N Merola	2	2	1
3	(Australia) S Virgona (United Kingdom) J Lumley	6	6	6
4	(United Kingdom) L Smart (United States) J Dodgson	6	6	4	6
5	(United Kingdom) D Long (United Kingdom) R Shenkman (A)	2	1	6	2
(United Kingdom) J Smith (Australia) J Woods-Casey	0	4	1
2	(United Kingdom) B Taylor-Matthews (Australia) N Howell	6	6	6

Semifinals
1	(United States) C Riviere (United States) T Chisholm	6	3	6	5	6
3	(United Kingdom) J Lumley (Australia) S Virgona	5	6	5	6	2
4	(United Kingdom) L Smart (United Kingdom) J Dodgson	3	6	6	6
2	(United Kingdom) B Taylor-Matthews (Australia) N Howell	6	4	0	3

Finals
1	(United States) C Riviere (United States) T Chisholm	6	5	6	6
2	(United Kingdom) B Taylor-Matthews (Australia) N Howell	1	6	0	2

=== Women's Singles Qualifying ===
Note: all players are amateurs except Claire Fahey

==== First Qualifier ====
Qualifier
1	(United States) P Pearson	0	0
2	(United States) A Wintersteen	6	6

==== Second Qualifier ====
Qualifier
1	(United States) B Wakim	0	0
2	(United States) C Soucek	6	6

=== Women's Singles ===
Note: all players are amateurs except Claire Fahey

First round
(United States) H Grassi Vest	6	6
(United States) A Wintersteen	0	0
(United Kingdom) R Heslop	0	0
(Australia) X Ranger	6	6
(United States) C Soucek	6	6
(United States) L Gephart	0	0

Second round
1	(United Kingdom) C Fahey
bye
(United States) H Grassi Vest	1	0
4	(United Kingdom) P Lumley	6	6
3	(Netherlands) S Bollerman	6	6
(Australia) X Ranger	0	0
(United States) C Soucek	1	0
2	(France) L van der Zwalmen	6	6

Semifinals
1	(United Kingdom) C Fahey	6	6
4	(United Kingdom) P Lumley	0	1
3	(Netherlands) S Bollerman	2	1
2	(France) L van der Zwalmen	6	6

Finals
1	(United Kingdom) C Fahey	6	6
2	(France) L van der Zwalmen	3	3

=== Women's Doubles ===
Note: all players are amateurs except Claire Fahey

First round
(United States) A Thompson (United States) A Clark	6	6
(United States) K Willers (United States) E Ronaldson	0	0
(United States) L Gephart (United States) B Wakim	5	6	5
(United States) H Grass-Vest (United States) A Wintersteen	6	1	6

Second round
1	(United Kingdom) C Fahey (United Kingdom) P Lumley
bye
(United States) A Thompson (United States) A Clark	6	6
(United States) C Donovan (United States) P Person	1	0
(Australia) X Ranger (United States) M Hayes	5	6	6
(United States) H Grass-Vest (United States) A Wintersteen	6	3	4
bye
2	(France) L van der Zwalmen (Netherlands) S Bollerman

Semifinals
1	(United Kingdom) C Fahey (United Kingdom) P Lumley	6	6
(United States) A Thompson (United States) A Clark	0	0
(Australia) X Ranger (United States) M Hayes	0	0
2	(France) L van der Zwalmen (Netherlands) S Bollerman	6	6

Finals
1	(United Kingdom) C Fahey (United Kingdom) P Lumley	6	6
2	(France) L van der Zwalmen (Netherlands) S Bollerman	3	5

== See also ==
- Grand Slam (real tennis)
