= 2025 Real Tennis World Championship =

- Date: 23-27 September
- Edition: 70th
- Category: IRTPA
- Draw: 4D
- Location: Newport, Rhode Island
- Venue: International Tennis Hall of Fame

Champions

Men's singles
- TBC
- Real Tennis World Championship

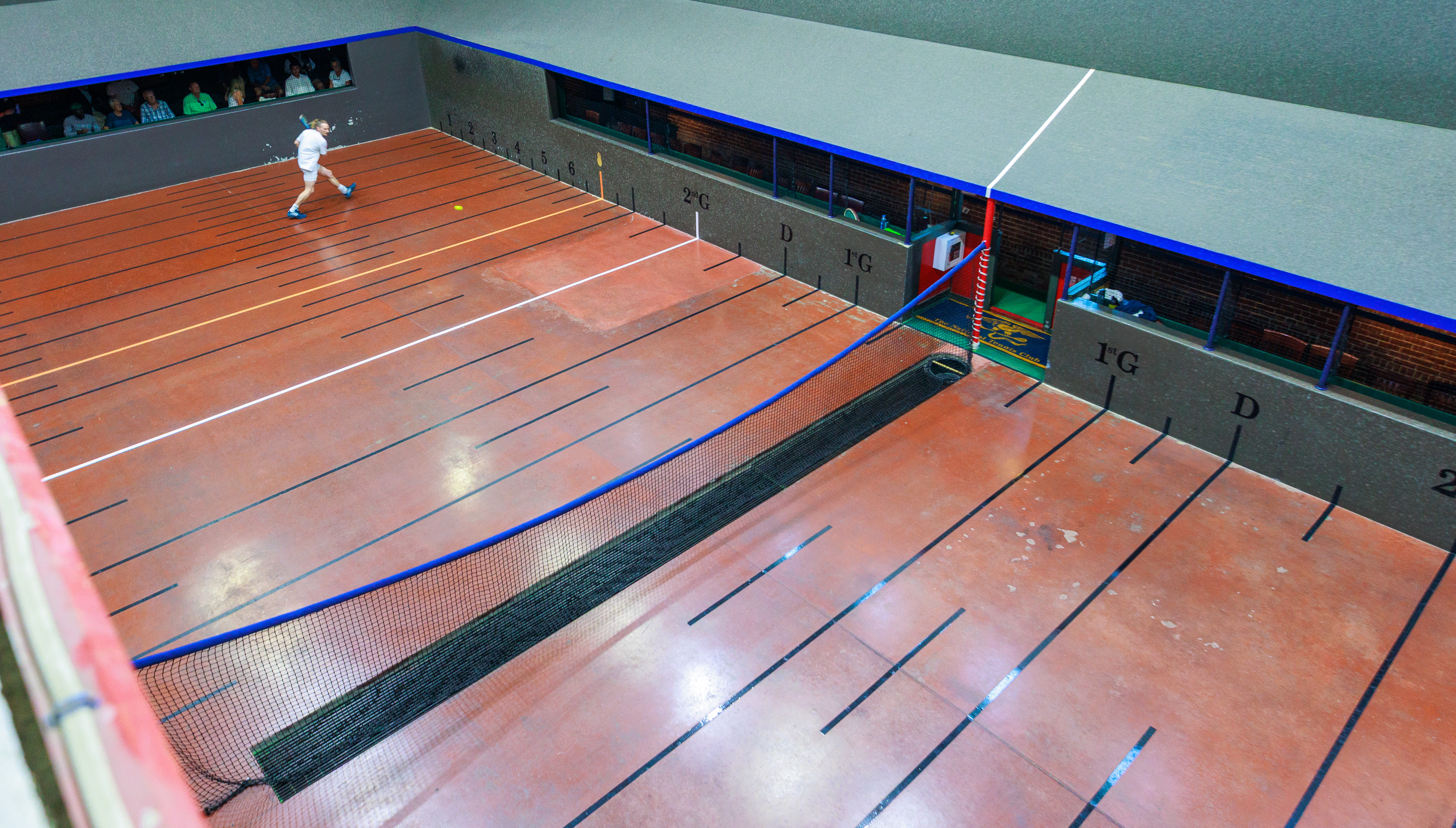
The court at the National Tennis Club in Newport

The 2025 Real Tennis World Championship (known in the US as the 2025 Court Tennis World Championship) was the 70th edition of the real tennis World Championship. It was held at the International Tennis Hall of Fame in Newport, Rhode Island. The 2025 Ladies Real Tennis World Championship were held at the same venue in May.

Defending champion Camden Riviere contested the Championship for the sixth time, having previously won on three occasions. His challenger John Lumley was chosen through a series of eliminators. It was the third time that Newport hosted the Challenge, being the venue that Riviere won his first World Championship in 2016.

Riviere won the match, and the championship, in two days, by 7 sets to 1: 6/2 6/3 6/4 6/4 5/6 6/4 6/4 6/4.

== Qualification ==
As the defending champion, Camden Riviere automatically qualifies for the final. The challenger is determined by a series of eliminators. The top four players in the World Race, excluding Riviere, qualify for the eliminators. Points in the World Race were available for events in 2023 and 2024 from the following tournaments:

- Australian Open (2023, 2024)
- British Open (2023, 2024)
- Champions Trophy (2023, 2024)
- French Open (2023, 2024)
- US Open (2023, 2024)
- US Professional Singles (2023, 2024)

As at the conclusion of the 2024 British Open, the standings in the World Race were as follows:

Rank	Player	Club	Points	Qualified
1	(United States) Camden Riviere	International Tennis Club of Washington	94325	Yes, as Defending Champion
2	(United Kingdom) John Lumley	Racquet Club of Philadelphia	59589	Yes
3	(Australia) Nick Howell	Aiken Tennis Club	55159	Yes
4	(United Kingdom) Ben Taylor-Matthews	Bristol and Bath Tennis Club	39460	Yes
5	(Australia) Steve Virgona	Racquet Club of Chicago	37226	Yes
6	(United Kingdom) Leon Smart	Tennis and Racquet Club, Boston	27373	No
7	(United Kingdom) Bryn Sayers	Queen's Club	18565	No
8	(United Kingdom) Robert Shenkman (A)	Manchester Tennis and Racquet Club	17459	No
9	(Australia) Robert Fahey	The Oratory School	14954	No
10	(France) Matthieu Sarlangue (A)	Jeu de Paume de Paris	12302	No
11	(United Kingdom) Lewis Williams	Leamington Tennis Court Club	10534	No
12	(United Kingdom) Chris Chapman	Royal Melbourne Tennis Club	9654	No

All of the top four players elected to enter the Eliminators. The matches will be seeded in the first round, with the first seed playing the fourth seed and the second seed playing the third seed. The winners will progress to the Final Eliminator, from which the winner will challenge Camden Riviere. The venues for the eliminators will be chosen through a series of monetary bids from the players in order to select their preferred court. The Final Eliminator may also be bid by a neutral club.

The Challenger from 2023, John Lumley will return to the Eliminator process for the second time. Lumley won two tournaments during the qualification cycle, the 2023 Champions Trophy and the 2024 Australian Open. He also reached the final of every other tournament he entered. Lumley won through the 2023 Eliminators beating Chris Chapman and Nick Howell, both at his home court of Philadelphia.

Nick Howell will play in his third Eliminator. He lost the First Round Eliminator to Camden Riviere in 2020, and to Lumley in 2023. In the qualification period he won the 2023 French Open and the 2024 Champions Trophy, his first two singles tournament victories at the highest level. He also reached the final of three of four Opens in 2024, missing only the 2024 US Open.

Ben Taylor-Matthews will play in his fourth series of Eliminators. He lost to Bryn Sayers in a home and away format in 2012, and lost in first round Eliminators at away courts to Chris Chapman and Nick Howell in 2020 and 2023 respectively. Taylor-Matthews best results in the qualifying period was reaching the final of the Champions Trophy in both 2023 and 2024.

Steve Virgona was the Challenger in two World Championships, 2010 and 2012, both times losing to Robert Fahey. He returns to the Eliminator process for the first time since 2018, where he lost to Fahey in a home and away play-off. He was a finalist at the 2023 French Open.

=== Eliminators ===
A bidding process was held for the hosting rights for the first round eliminators. Although Taylor-Matthews outbid Howell to host their match at the Bristol Real Tennis Club, as the higher seed, Howell exercised his right to counter-bid and secure the hosting rights at the Aiken Tennis Club. Neither Lumley nor Virgona bid for hosting their first round eliminator, with their fixture defaulting to home-and-away.

The final eliminator venue was dependent on the players in the final. Howell, as the largest bidder, had won the hosting rights for Aiken regardless of his opposition, while Lumley would have hosted in Philadelphia had he won his bid.

1st Round Eliminator (Round 1)

1st Round Eliminator (Round 2)

Final Eliminator

== World Championships ==
=== Venue ===
The event was announced as the International Tennis Hall of Fame in Newport, Rhode Island on 1st October 2024. It was organised by the United States Court Tennis Association. It was the third singles World Championship held in Newport, following 2004 and 2016. It was the second consecutive challenge held in the United States, the first time since 1994. Newport also hosted the 2025 Ladies Real Tennis World Championship, having previously hosted that event in 2009 and 1995. The club has never hosted the World Doubles Championship. Riviere has not lost a match at Newport since 2013.
