= 2018 British Open (real tennis) =

- Date: 17-26 November (men); 4-7 April (women)
- Edition: 40th
- Category: IRTPA
- Draw: 24S / 12D (men); 9S / 8D (women)
- Location: West Kensington, London, United Kingdom (men); Hayling Island, United Kingdom (women)
- Venue: Queen's Club (men); Radley College (men's qualifying); Seacourt Tennis Club (women)

Champions

Men's singles
- (Australia) Robert Fahey

Women's singles
- (United Kingdom) Claire Fahey

Men's doubles
- (Australia) Robert Fahey / (Australia) Nick Howell

Women's doubles
- (United Kingdom) Claire Fahey / (United Kingdom) Sarah Vigrass
← 2017 ·	British Open (real tennis)	· 2019 →

The 2018 Real Tennis British Open was the 40th edition of the British Open since it became an annual event in 1979. The men's event was held at the Queen's Club in London between November 11–20, 2018 and was organised by the Tennis and Rackets Association. It formed part of the qualifying series for the 2020 Real Tennis World Championship. The women's event was held at the Seacourt Tennis Club on Hayling Island between April 4–7, 2018. The men's draw was the fourth and final grand slam event of the year.

The men's singles draw was won by Robert Fahey, his 50th Open title and his first British Open title since 2011. He also won the doubles with Nick Howell, the pair winning three of four grand slam events that year. In the women's draw, Claire Fahey won her sixth British Open singles title, forming part of her sixth calendar year Grand Slam. Lea van der Zwalmen made her British Open debut. The tournament would be the final tournament attended by Kieran Booth before his retirement from international play.

== Draw and results ==
Amateur players are marked as (A)

=== Men's Singles Qualifying ===
==== First Qualifier ====
Qualifying Round 1			Final Qualifying Round
			(United Kingdom) J Smith	6	6
(United Kingdom) L Gale	6	6	(United Kingdom) L Gale	4	5
(United Kingdom) A Player	4	5

==== Second Qualifier ====
Final Qualifying Round
(United Kingdom) J Dawes	6	6
(United Kingdom) A Flippence	2	2

==== Third Qualifier ====
Qualifying Round 1			Final Qualifying Round
			(United Kingdom) C Greenhalgh	6	6
(United Kingdom) N Mackenzie	6	6	(United Kingdom) L Gale	4	4
(Australia) J Woods-Casey	2	4

==== Fourth Qualifier ====
Qualifying Round 1			Final Qualifying Round
			(United Kingdom) W Burns	6	6
(United Kingdom) P Dunn (A)	6	6	(United Kingdom) P Dunn (A)	4	4
(United Kingdom) N Merola	5	5

=== Men's Singles ===
First round
(United Kingdom) N Mackenzie	0	6	4	2
(United Kingdom) J Douglas (A)	6	5	6	6
Q	(United Kingdom) J Dawes	0	0	0
(United Kingdom) J Lumley	6	6	6
(United Kingdom) L Gordon	6	6	6
Q	(United Kingdom) W Burns	3	1	0
(United Kingdom) R McNaughtan	3	6	1	5
(United Kingdom) D Long	6	5	6	6
(United Kingdom) T Durack	6	6	6
Q	(United Kingdom) C Greenhalgh	4	4	4
(United Kingdom) E Kay (A)	6	3	6	6
(United Kingdom) P Wright (A)	1	6	3	1
(United Kingdom) L Smart	6	5	6	6
Q	(United Kingdom) J Smith	3	6	2	3
(United Kingdom) Z Eadle	0	1	2
(France) M Sarlangue	6	6	6

Second Round
1	(Australia) R Fahey	4	6	6	6
(United Kingdom) J Douglas (A)	6	2	1	2
5	(Australia) N Howell	5	6	6	6
(United Kingdom) J Lumley	6	5	4	2
6	(Australia) K Booth (A)	6	6	6
(United Kingdom) L Gordon	3	3	2
4	(United Kingdom) B Taylor-Matthews	6
(United Kingdom) D Long	5	ret
3	(Australia) S Virgona	6	6	6
(United Kingdom) T Durack	0	2	0
7	(United Kingdom) B Sayers	6	6	6
(United Kingdom) E Kay (A)	0	1	1
8	(United States) T Chisholm	6	6	4	6
(United Kingdom) L Smart	0	4	6	1
2	(United Kingdom) C Chapman	2	6	6	6
(France) M Sarlangue	6	4	1	5

Quarterfinals
1	(Australia) R Fahey	6	6	6
5	(Australia) N Howell	1	1	3
6	(Australia) K Booth (A)	2	1	0
4	(United Kingdom) B Taylor-Matthews	6	6	6
3	(Australia) S Virgona	6	6	4	3	6
7	(United Kingdom) B Sayers	5	2	6	6	4
8	(United States) T Chisholm	1	3	2
2	(Australia) C Chapman	6	6	6

Semifinals
1	(Australia) R Fahey	3	5	6	6	6
4	(United Kingdom) B Taylor-Matthews	6	6	3	5	5
3	(Australia) S Virgona	6	2	4	1
2	(Australia) C Chapman	5	6	6	6

Finals
1	(Australia) R Fahey	6	6	6
2	(Australia) C Chapman	5	4	4

=== Men's Doubles Qualifying ===
==== First Qualifier ====
Qualifying Round 1				Final Qualifying Round
				(United Kingdom) D Long (United Kingdom) C Greenhalgh	6	6
(United Kingdom) B Ronaldson (United Kingdom) N Mackenzie	6	5	6	(United Kingdom) B Ronaldson (United Kingdom) N Mackenzie	3	2
(United Kingdom) J Acheson-Gray (A) (United Kingdom) A Dolman (A)	3	6	3

=== Men's Doubles ===
First round
(United Kingdom) W Burns (United Kingdom) J Dawes	3	0	6	2
(United Kingdom) T Durack (United Kingdom) L Gordon	6	6	3	6
(United Kingdom) J Douglas (A) (United Kingdom) P Wright (A)	4	5	3
(United Kingdom) E Kay (A) (United Kingdom) L Smart	6	6	6
Q	(United Kingdom) D Long (United Kingdom) C Greenhalgh	4	6	6	2	3
(Australia) K Booth (A) (United Kingdom) A Lumsden (A)	6	2	4	6	6
Q	(United Kingdom) A Player (United Kingdom) Z Eadle	3	4	2
(France) M Sarlangue (A) (France) N Victoir (A)	6	6	6

Quarter-finals
1	(United States) T Chisholm (United Kingdom) J Lumley	6	6	6
(United Kingdom) T Durack (United Kingdom) L Gordon	1	1	0
4	(Australia) C Chapman (Australia) S Virgona	6	6	6
(United Kingdom) E Kay (A) (United Kingdom) L Smart	0	1	0
3	(Australia) R Fahey (Australia) N Howell	6	6	2	6
(Australia) K Booth (A) (United Kingdom) A Lumsden (A)	5	2	6	1
2	(United Kingdom) B Sayers (United Kingdom) B Taylor-Matthews	6	6	6
(France) M Sarlangue (A) (France) N Victoir (A)	5	4	1

Semi-finals
1	(United States) T Chisholm (United Kingdom) J Lumley	5	3	6	4
4	(Australia) C Chapman (Australia) S Virgona	6	6	4	6
3	(Australia) R Fahey (Australia) N Howell	6	6	5	6
2	(United Kingdom) B Sayers (Australia) B Taylor-Matthews	3	6	3	2

Final
4	(Australia) C Chapman (Australia) S Virgona	3	5	2
3	(Australia) R Fahey (Australia) N Howell	6	6	6

=== Women's Singles Qualifying ===
==== First Qualifier ====
Final Qualifying Round
(United Kingdom) A Pye	6	6
(Netherlands) L Douwes Dekker	1	1

==== Second Qualifier ====
Final Qualifying Round
(United Kingdom) N Doble	6	6
(United Kingdom) H Lucey	0	0

==== Third Qualifier ====
Final Qualifying Round
(United Kingdom) I Candy	6	6
(Netherlands) K van Boeckel	0	1

=== Women's Singles ===
Note: all players are amateurs except Claire Fahey

First round
(Latvia) I Dulbish	6	6
(United Kingdom) N Doble	5	4
(United Kingdom) I Candy	3	2
4	(France) L van der Zwalmen	6	6
3	(Netherlands) S Bollerman	6	6
(United Kingdom) S Dannreuther	0	0
(United Kingdom) I Hunt	0	0
(United Kingdom) T Lumley	6	6
(United Kingdom) J Garside	6	6
(United Kingdom) A Pye	0	1

Second round
1	(United Kingdom) C Fahey
bye
(Latvia) I Dulbish	3	2
4	(France) L van der Zwalmen	6	6
3	(Netherlands) S Bollerman	6	6
(United Kingdom) T Lumley	1	2
(United Kingdom) J Garside	4	3
2	(United Kingdom) S Vigrass	6	6

Semifinals
1	(United Kingdom) C Fahey	6	6
4	(France) L van der Zwalmen	5	0
3	(Netherlands) S Bollerman	6	6
2	(United Kingdom) S Vigrass	3	5

Finals
1	(United Kingdom) C Fahey	6	6
3	(Netherlands) S Bollerman	1	1

=== Women's Doubles ===
Note: all players are amateurs except Claire Fahey

Quarterfinals
(France) L van der Zwalmen (United Kingdom) J Garside	6
(Netherlands) L Douwes Dekker (Netherlands) K van Boeckel	0
(Latvia) I Dulbish (United Kingdom) I Candy	6
(United Kingdom) I Hunt (United Kingdom) S Dannruether	0
(United Kingdom) L Hutchinson (United Kingdom) C Nicholls	0
2	(Netherlands) S Bollerman (United Kingdom) T Lumley	6

Semifinals
1	(United Kingdom) C Fahey (United Kingdom) S Vigrass	6
(France) L van der Zwalmen (United Kingdom) J Garside	1
(Latvia) I Dulbish (United Kingdom) I Candy	1
2	(Netherlands) S Bollerman (United Kingdom) T Lumley	6

Finals
1	(United Kingdom) C Fahey (United Kingdom) S Vigrass	6
2	(Netherlands) S Bollerman (United Kingdom) T Lumley	4

== See also ==
- Grand Slam (real tennis)
