= 2025 U.S. Open =

2025 U.S. Open may refer to:

- 2025 U.S. Open (golf), a major golf tournament
- 2025 US Open (tennis), a grand slam tennis tournament
- 2025 US Open (court tennis)
- 2025 U.S. Open Cup, a soccer tournament
- 2025 U.S. Open (badminton), a badminton tournament
