= Saskia Bollerman =

Dutch real tennis player

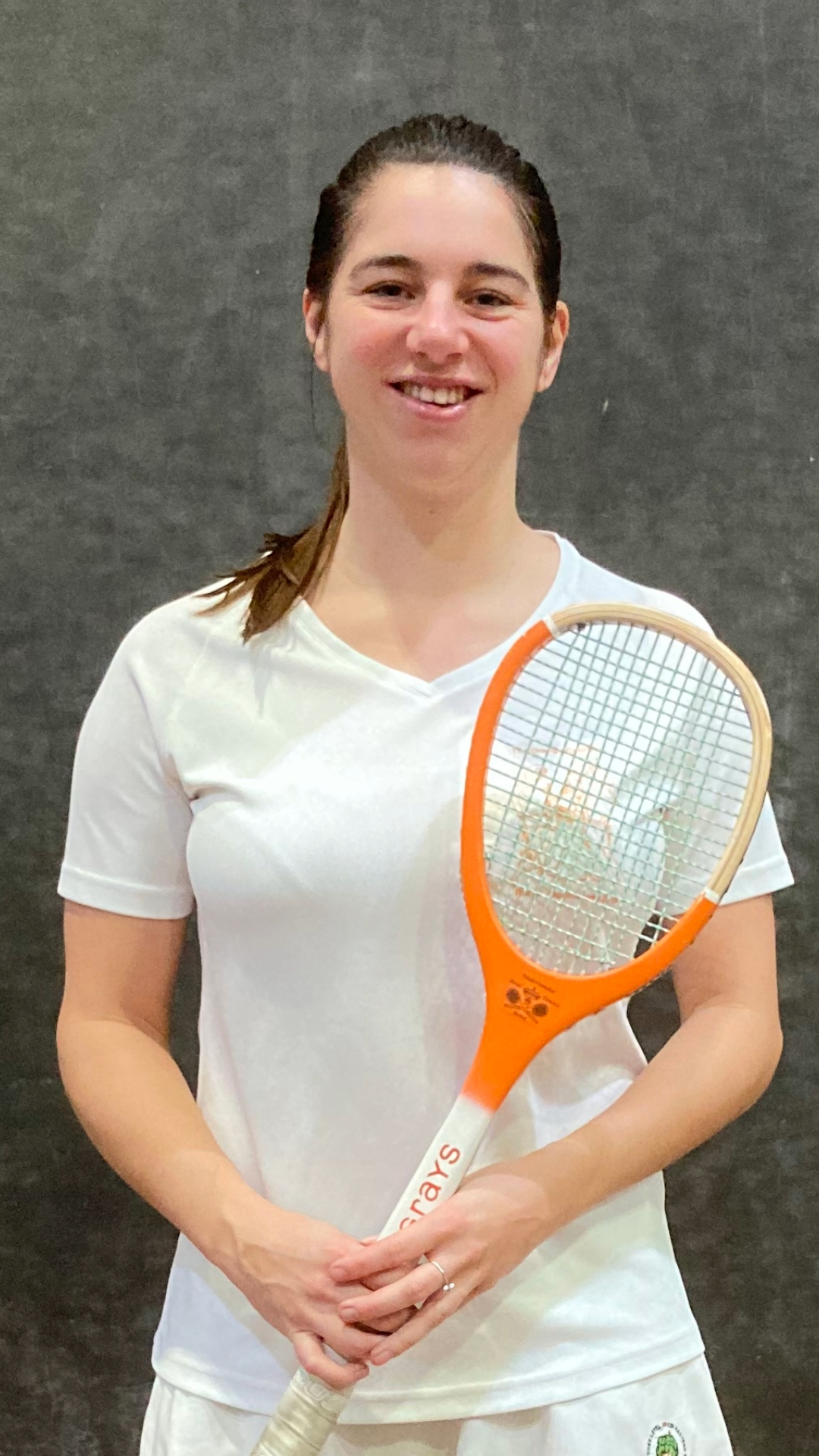
- Saskia Bollerman at the 2023 British Open
- Full name: Saskia Bollerman
- Country (sports): Netherlands
- Residence: Netherlands
- Born: 20 September 1994 (age 31)
- Plays: Right-handed

World Championships
- Ladies Singles: SF (2017, 2023)
- Ladies Doubles: F (2017, 2022, 2023)

Singles
- Career titles: 2
- Highest ranking: 3
- Current ranking: 3

Grand Slam singles results
- Australian Open: W (2023)
- British Open: F (2018)
- French Open: F (2017)
- US Open: W (2017)

Doubles
- Career titles: 8
- Highest ranking: 4
- Current ranking: 4

Grand Slam doubles results
- Australian Open: W (2016, 2017, 2018, 2023, 2025)
- French Open: W (2017, 2022, 2024)
- British Open: F (2018, 2023)
- US Open: W (2017)

Saskia Bollerman (born 20 September 1994) is a Dutch real tennis player. She holds two singles and nine doubles Open titles, and has reached the final of the World Doubles Championship on three occasions. She has held the Dutch Women's Champion title between 2016 and 2018 and continuously since 2022, and reached the final of the Dutch Closed Championship on two occasions, losing both times to her brother Paul Bollerman.

== Career ==
Bollerman grew up in the Netherlands, a country which has not had active real tennis courts since the 17th century. Bollerman started playing real tennis as her father jointly initiated the Dutch Real Tennis Association, initially playing occasionally at Seacourt Tennis Club, but later moving to Radley College in Oxfordshire once that court was built in 2008. As such, Bollerman would only play real tennis once or twice per year. Bollerman competed in the Dutch Championship at Radley College every year since 2010.

Bollerman's career as a real tennis player began in earnest in 2015, when the women's Real Tennis World Championship was head at the Leamington Tennis Court Club in Warwickshire where she won the Plate competition. That year, she also competed in the French Open for the first time, reaching the quarter final. In the second half of 2015, Bollerman moved to the Royal Melbourne Tennis Club for a six-month stint to improve her real tennis while completing her Master's degree. While in Melbourne, she partnered with World Champion Claire Fahey to win her first Open Doubles title at the 2016 Australian Open.

Now firmly established in the World Top 10, Bollerman competed in all four Opens in the calendar year 2017, winning three doubles titles - two with Fahey and one with Tara Lumley - and her first singles title at the US Open in the absence of Fahey, who was away due to her pregnancy. At that year's World Championship in Tuxedo, Bollerman reached the semi final of the singles competition, losing to Claire's sister Sarah Vigrass, as well as the final of the doubles partnered with Amanda Avedissian.

Bollerman competed in the first two Opens of 2018, reaching the final of both the Australian and British Opens against Fahey. However an injury in the 2018 LRTA International at Petworth House forced Bollerman to take a break from real tennis for over 12 months to recover. Bollerman briefly returned in the doubles of the Australian Open with Kate Leeming in 2020, but the COVID-19 pandemic prevented any further tournament play for another two years.

Bollerman's full return to competitive real tennis was at the 2022 Real Tennis World Championship at Fontainebleau near Paris. There, she lost the quarter final of the singles to local favourite Lea van der Zwalmen, but partnered Isabel Candy to reach the final of the doubles competition for the second time. Later that year, Bollerman would regain her Dutch Women's Championship title, and would win the doubles at the 2022 French Open with van der Zwalmen, her first victory against Fahey who had partnered with Nicola Doble. In late 2022, Bollerman would represent the Rest of the World team against Great Britain at the inaugural women's Bathurst Cup at Lord's Cricket Ground. Bollerman was the only member of her team to win both matches, as the event was won by Great Britain.

Bollerman competed in all four Opens in 2023. She won her first Australian Open singles title in January against Jo See Tan, and partnered with Tan to win the doubles. At the 2023 World Championship at The Oratory School, Bollerman and van der Zwalmen reached the final, the third such occasion for Bollerman and the first for van der Zwalmen, falling to Fahey and Lumley. van der Zwalmen and Bollerman were unable to replicate their feat of beating Fahey at the previous years French Open in either the 2023 French or US Opens.

In 2024, Bollerman again competed for the Rest of the World at the Bathurst Cup in Melbourne. The match against Great Britain was tied after the regular rounds of singles and doubles, so went to a deciding match where Bollerman and van der Zwalmen defeated Lumley and Georgie Willis for their first Bathurst Cup victory. The pair lost again to Lumley and Fahey at the proceeding Australian Open in Hobart. Bollerman teamed up with Fahey again at the 2024 French Open, winning the doubles against van der Zwalmen and Jess Garside.

At the 2025 Australian Open, Bollerman and Fahey won the doubles event against the same competition at the previous year's French Open.

== Performance timeline ==
=== Singles ===
Key
W	F	SF	QF	#R	RR	Q#	DNQ	A	NH

(W) winner; (F) finalist; (SF) semifinalist; (QF) quarterfinalist; (#R) rounds 4, 3, 2, 1; (RR) round-robin stage; (Q#) qualification round; (DNQ) did not qualify; (A) absent; (NH) not held; (SR) strike rate (events won / competed); (W–L) win–loss record.
To avoid confusion and double counting, these charts are updated at the conclusion of a tournament or when the player's participation has ended.

Current through the 2025 Australian Open

Tournament	2015	2016	2017	2018	2019	2020	2021	2022	2023	2024	2025	SR	W–L	Win %
World Championship
World Championship	1R	A	SF	A	NH			QF	SF	NH		0 / 4	5–4	56%
Win–loss	0–1	0–0	2–1	0–0	0–0	0–0	0–0	1–1	2–1	0–0	0–0	0 / 4	5–4	56%
Grand Slam tournaments
Australian Open	A	QF	SF	F	A	A	NH	A	W	SF	SF	1 / 6	7–5	58%
British Open	A	A	SF	F	A	NH		A	SF	A		0 / 3	7–3	70%
French Open	QF	QF	F	A	A	NH		SF	SF	SF		0 / 6	5–6	45%
US Open	A	A	A	W	A	NH		A	SF	A		1 / 2	4–1	80%
Win–loss	1–1	0–2	5–3	8–2	0–0	0–0	0–0	0–1	6–3	2–2	1–1	2 / 17	23–15	61%
Career Statistics
	2015	2016	2017	2018	2019	2020	2021	2022	2023	2024	2025	Career		
Tournaments	2	2	4	3	0	0	0	2	5	2	1	Career total: 21		
Titles	0	0	0	1	0	0	0	0	1	0	0	Career total: 2		
Finals	0	0	1	3	0	0	0	0	1	0	0	Career total: 5		
Overall win–loss	1–2	0–2	7–4	8–2	0–0	0–0	0–0	1–2	8–4	2–2	1–1	28–19		60%
Win %	33%	0%	64%	80%	–	–	–	33%	67%	50%	50%	Career total: 60%		

=== Doubles ===
Tournament	2015	2016	2017	2018	2019	2020	2021	2022	2023	2024	2025	SR	W–L	Win %
World Championship
World Championship	A	NH	F	NH	A	NH		F	F	A		0 / 3	5–3	63%
Win–loss	0–0	0–0	2–1	0–0	0–0	0–0	0–0	1–1	2–1	0–0	0–0	0 / 3	5–3	63%
Grand Slam tournaments
Australian Open	A	W	W	W	A	F	NH		W	F	W	5 / 7	11–2	85%
British Open	A	A	SF	F	A	NH		A	F	A		0 / 3	5–3	63%
French Open	QF	A	W	A	A	NH		W	F	W		3 / 5	5–2	71%
US Open	A	A	W	A	A	NH		A	F	A		1 / 2	3–1	75%
Win–loss	0–1	2–0	6–1	4–1	0–0	1–1	0–0	1–0	6–3	2–1	2–0	9 / 17	24–8	75%
Career Statistics
	2015	2016	2017	2018	2019	2020	2021	2022	2023	2024	2025	Career		
Tournaments	1	1	5	2	0	1	0	2	5	2	1	Career total: 20		
Titles	0	1	3	1	0	0	0	1	1	1	1	Career total: 9		
Finals	0	1	4	2	0	1	0	2	5	2	1	Career total: 18		
Overall win–loss	0–1	2–0	8–2	4–1	0–0	1–1	0–0	2–1	8–4	2–1	2–0	29–11		73%
Win %	0%	100%	80%	80%	–	50%	–	67%	67%	67%	100%	Career total: 73%		
