= 2024 Australian Open (real tennis) =

- Date: 2-9 January (men); 18–23 March (women)
- Edition: 92nd (men); 34th (women)
- Category: IRTPA (men); None (women)
- Draw: 16S / 8D (men); 12S / 6D (women)
- Location: Melbourne, Victoria (men); Hobart, Tasmania (women)
- Venue: Royal Melbourne Tennis Club (men); Hobart Real Tennis Club (women)

Champions

Men's singles
- (United Kingdom) John Lumley

Women's singles
- (United Kingdom) Claire Fahey

Men's doubles
- (United Kingdom) John Lumley / (Australia) Steve Virgona

Women's doubles
- (United Kingdom) Claire Fahey / (United Kingdom) Tara Lumley
← 2023 ·	Australian Open (real tennis)	· 2025 →

The 2024 Real Tennis Australian Open was the 92nd edition of the Australian Open. The men's event was held at the Royal Melbourne Tennis Club in Melbourne between January 2–9, 2024 and was organised by the Australian Real Tennis Association, forming part of the qualifying series for the 2025 Real Tennis World Championship. It was held concurrently with the 2024 Boomerang Cup. The women's event was held at the Hobart Real Tennis Club between March 18–23, 2024. The women's event was held at a later time to align with the 2024 Bathurst Cup, hosted at the Royal Melbourne Tennis Club in March. The men's draw was the first grand slam event of the year.

The men's singles draw was won by John Lumley for the second time, having previously won the 2022 edition. Lumley also won the men's doubles draw alongside Steve Virgona, their first Open title as a pairing. The women's singles draw was won by incumbent World Champion Claire Fahey, her ninth Australian Open singles victory and her first since 2019. She also won the doubles draw with Tara Lumley, the pairing having previously won the 2019 edition.

The event featured the debut of women's world number 2 Lea van der Zwalmen at the Australian Open.

== Draw and results ==
Amateur players are marked as (A)

=== Men's Singles Qualifying ===
==== First Qualifier ====
First Round
1	(Australia) D Williams (A)	6	6
	(Australia) A Fowler	1	2

==== Second Qualifier ====
First Round
	(Australia) J Pastoor	1	1
2	(Australia) P Rosedale (A)	6	6

=== Men's Singles ===
First round
1	(United Kingdom) J Lumley	6	6	6
Q	(Australia) P Rosedale (A)	0	2	2
(United Kingdom) L Gale	3	6	6	6
(Australia) O Pridmore	6	2	1	1
5	(Australia) S Virgona	6	6	6
Q	(Australia) D Williams (A)	2	1	3
(Australia) J Woods-Casey	2	1	3
4	(Australia) C Chapman	6	6	6
3	(United Kingdom) B Taylor-Matthews	3	3	3
(Australia) K Booth (A)	6	6	6
(United Kingdom) D Long	6	6	5	1	6
6	(United Kingdom) L Williams	2	1	6	6	3
(United Kingdom) C Fahey	6	5	6	6
(United Kingdom) J Smith	4	6	2	5
(United Kingdom) N Merola	0	2	4
2	(Australia) N Howell	6	6	6

Quarter-finals
1	(United Kingdom) J Lumley	6	6	6
(United Kingdom) L Gale	1	1	0
5	(Australia) S Virgona	6	4	6	6
4	(Australia) C Chapman	4	6	5	4
(Australia) K Booth (A)	6	6	6
(United Kingdom) D Long	3	3	1
(United Kingdom) C Fahey	0	0	0
2	(Australia) N Howell	6	6	6

Semi-finals
1	(United Kingdom) J Lumley	3	5	6	6	6
5	(Australia) S Virgona	6	6	1	0	5
(Australia) K Booth (A)	3	2	3
2	(Australia) N Howell	6	6	6

Final
1	(United Kingdom) J Lumley	6	5	6	6
2	(Australia) N Howell	4	6	5	4

=== Men's Doubles ===
Quarterfinals
1	(United Kingdom) J Lumley (Australia) S Virgona	6	6	6
(Australia) K Booth (A) (Australia) O Pridmore (A)	3	1	2
(United Kingdom) L Gale (Australia) J Gould (A)	1	2	2
3	(United Kingdom) B Taylor-Matthews (United Kingdom) D Long	6	6	6
4	(United Kingdom) C Fahey (Australia) R Fahey	6	6	1	6
(Australia) J Woods-Casey (United Kingdom) J Smith	2	2	6	4
(United Kingdom) N Merola (United Kingdom) L Williams	5	4	5
2	(Australia) N Howell (Australia) C Chapman	6	6	6

Semifinals
1	(United Kingdom) J Lumley (Australia) S Virgona	6	6	6
3	(United Kingdom) B Taylor-Matthews (United Kingdom) D Long	3	4	1
4	(United Kingdom) C Fahey (Australia) R Fahey	2	3	0
2	(Australia) N Howell (Australia) C Chapman	6	6	6

Finals
1	(United Kingdom) J Lumley (Australia) S Virgona	6	6	6
2	(Australia) N Howell (Australia) C Chapman	2	0	3

=== Women's Singles ===
Note: all players are amateurs except Claire Fahey

First round
(United Kingdom) N Doble	6	6
(United Kingdom) E Young	4	3
(Australia) JS Tan	6	6
(Australia) A Green	2	3
(United Kingdom) G Willis	6	6
(United Kingdom) J Garside	4	5
(United Kingdom) G Ingham	2	4
(Australia) E Clyde	6	6

Quarter-finals
1	(United Kingdom) C Fahey	6	6
(United Kingdom) N Doble	0	0
4	(Netherlands) S Bollerman	6	6
(Australia) JS Tan	1	2
3	(United Kingdom) T Lumley	6	6
(United Kingdom) G Willis	4	3
2	(France) L van der Zwalmen	6	6
(Australia) E Clyde	1	1

Semi-finals
1	(United Kingdom) C Fahey	6	6
4	(Netherlands) S Bollerman	0	2
3	(United Kingdom) T Lumley	0	0
2	(France) L van der Zwalmen	6	6

Final
1	(United Kingdom) C Fahey	6	6
2	(France) L van der Zwalmen	2	1

=== Women's Doubles ===
Note: all players are amateurs except Claire Fahey

Quarterfinals
(United Kingdom) G Willis (United Kingdom) N Doble	6	6
(United Kingdom) J Garside (United Kingdom) G Ingham	0	0
(Australia) A Green (United Kingdom) E Young	6	6
(Australia) JS Tan (Australia) E Clyde	5	2

Semifinals
1	(United Kingdom) C Fahey (United Kingdom) T Lumley	6	6
(United Kingdom) G Willis (United Kingdom) N Doble	1	1
2	(Netherlands) S Bollerman (France) L van der Zwlamen	6	6
(Australia) A Green (United Kingdom) E Young	0	1

Finals
1	(United Kingdom) C Fahey (United Kingdom) T Lumley	6	6
2	(Netherlands) S Bollerman (France) L van der Zwalmen	3	4

== See also ==
- Grand Slam (real tennis)
