= Lea Van Der Zwalmen =

French real tennis and rackets player

- Full name: Lea Van Der Zwalmen
- Country (sports): France
- Residence: France
- Born: 15 February 1996 (age 30); Leuven, Belgium
- Plays: Right-handed

World Championships
- Ladies Singles: F (2022, 2023)
- Ladies Doubles: F (2023)

Singles
- Career titles: 0
- Highest ranking: 2
- Current ranking: 2

Grand Slam singles results
- Australian Open: Ladies: F (2024, 2025); Open: 1R (2025)
- British Open: Ladies: F (2019); Open: Q1 (2019)
- French Open: F (2018, 2022, 2023, 2024)
- US Open: F (2023, 2025)

Doubles
- Career titles: 2
- Highest ranking: 2
- Current ranking: 2

Grand Slam doubles results
- Australian Open: F (2024, 2025)
- French Open: W (2022)
- British Open: F (2019)
- US Open: W (2025)

Lea Van Der Zwalmen (born 15 February 1996) is a French rackets and real tennis player and the current rackets World Champion. She is undefeated in rackets since the inaugural Ladies World Championship in 2015. In real tennis, she represents the Jeu de Paume de Bordeaux in Mérignac, Bordeaux and is women's world number 2. She has contested two World Championship singles finals and has won two Open doubles titles at the 2022 French Open and the 2025 US Open. At the 2025 Australian Open she became the second female player to compete in the main draw of an Open championship. She has previously represented France in junior squash and also plays padel tennis.

== Career ==
=== Squash ===
Van Der Zwalmen started playing squash at the age of 8 whilst living in Toulouse, France. Van Der Zwalmen captained the French team to the 2013 Women's World Junior Squash Championships in Wrocław, Poland. She lost in the first round to Canadian Alison Richmond. In the team event, she led the French team the 10th place playoff against Colombia. She played in the Under 19 French Championships in 2015, which she won after finishing runner-up for eight years. She achieved a highest world ranking of 160 in February 2015. When she moved to study at Clifton College she retired from squash to focus on her rackets career.

=== Rackets ===
Van Der Zwalmen took up rackets while studying A-levels at Clifton College. She won the Schoolgirls Seniors Singles Championships in 2014 and 2015. Women had only been permitted to play rackets from 2008, and in 2011 the first British Open for women was hosted at the Queen's Club. For the first four years, the event was dominated by Claire Fahey, who did not enter in 2015 due to a scheduling clash with the real tennis US Open. Van Der Zwalmen won the British Open on her first attempt in 2015, and would go on to be undefeated at the tournament between 2015 and 2019. She hasn't entered the tournament from 2020 onwards.

In 2015, the first ever rackets Ladies World Championship was hosted at the Queen's Club. As at the time, Fahey was the unchallenged champion, Van Der Zwalmen competed in an eliminator process to challenge Fahey for the inaugural title. She defeated Amanda Avedissian in the final eliminator, and went on to defeat Fahey 3 games to 1.

After the 2015 World Championship, Fahey retired from competitive rackets leaving Van Der Zwalmen as the dominant world number 1. Following the inaugural championship, future championships would be run as an eliminator process with the incumbent champion facing a single challenger for the title. The 2017 World Championship was held at Wellington College in Crowthorne, Berkshire. Georgie Willis qualified through the eliminator process to challenge Van Der Zwalmen. Van Der Zwalmen defended her title comfortably 3 games to zero. Willis again qualified through to the 2019 challenge, this time at the Queen's Club. Van Der Zwalmen again defended her title 3 games to zero.

The first Ladies Doubles World Championship was held in 2020, which Van Der Zwalmen lost to Tara Lumley and India Deakin while partnering Louisa Gengler-Saint. During the COVID-19 pandemic and following the completion of her Masters in Economics, Van Der Zwalmen moved to Bordeaux, and was not able to train or play rackets as there are no rackets courts in France. Nonetheless, Van Der Zwalmen returned to Queen's for the 2022 World Championship against Schoolgirl champion Cesca Sweet, winning 3 games to zero.

With Van Der Zwalmen no longer competing in British Opens, Fahey made a return to competitive rackets, winning the 2023 British Open equalling Van Der Zwalmen's record of 5 Open victories. The two would meet on the doubles court at the 2023 World Doubles Championship. Van Der Zwalmen and Sweet defeated Fahey and Lumley 3 games to zero. Despite Fahey's loss to Willis at the 2024 British Open final, Fahey would qualify through the eliminator process to challenge Van Der Zwalmen for the 2024 World Championship. In their first meeting in any singles competition since the inaugural edition back in 2015, Fahey opened with a strong start by winning the first two games and building a lead in the third. Van Der Zwalmen fought back, taking the third game to a set, and following up with a relatively quick fourth game. Going into the final game, Claire reached a set, but Van Der Zwalmen blitzed the set to 5 to win her fifth consecutive World Championship.

=== Real tennis ===
Van Der Zwalmen began playing real tennis at the Queen's Club in London following her second World Championship rackets victory in June 2017, with the stated goal of beating incumbent World Champion Claire Fahey. She debuted in the 2017 French Open in Paris, losing her singles in the first round to Dutch champion Saskia Bollerman. The following year, she reached the semi finals of the British Open at Seacourt, and the final of the French Open in Paris, falling to Fahey on both occasions. At the end of 2018, she had cemented her position as the women's world ranked number 2.

In 2019, Van Der Zwalmen became the fifth woman to achieve a real tennis handicap below 20 since the introduction of the modern handicap system in 2002, following Fahey, Charlotte Cornwallis, Penny Lumley and Kate Leeming. In addition to reaching her first British Open final, she became the first woman to compete for the Raquette d'Or - the French Amateur championship - reaching the semi final stage. She also entered the Men's division of the British Open, the second woman ever to do so behind Fahey, but lost her qualifying match to Freddie Bristowe.

In 2020, Van Der Zwalmen moved to Bordeaux to the newly opened court in Mérignac. However, COVID-19 pandemic prevented her from travelling and participating in tournaments. She nevertheless made the most of her spare time by training with Nick Howell who at the time was Head Pro of the Bordeaux club and number 5 in the world. At her resumption of play, she reached the final of the Raquette d'Or, losing to Matthieu Sarlangue. She also reached the final of the Coupe de Thélème in early 2022, a second division French open division tournament.

2022 saw the delayed edition of the Real Tennis World Championship held in Van Der Zwalmen's home country of France at the Palace of Fontainebleau for the first time since 2013. Van Der Zwalmen, despite never having participated in a real tennis World Championship before, was keen to defeat incumbent champion Claire Fahey, so only entered the singles competition. Van Der Zwalmen defeated Saskia Bollerman in the quarter finals and world number 3 Tara Lumley in the semi finals, both in straight sets. However, in the final Van Der Zwalmen lost to Fahey 6/0 6/2. Later that year, Van Der Zwalmen entered the French Open doubles with Bollerman. She played the final against Fahey and Nicola Doble. Van Der Zwalmen and Bollerman won the match 6/4 6/4, Van Der Zwalmen's first Open victory and the first time that Fahey had been defeated in women's singles or doubles since 2009.

Another World Championship was held in 2023, this time at Fahey's home court of The Oratory School in Woodcote, Oxfordshire. On her path to the singles final, Van Der Zwalmen defeated former World Champion Penny Lumley and world number 3 Tara Lumley. However, she was unable to improve her score from the previous year, losing to Fahey 6/1 6/1. In the doubles, she again partnered Bollerman and reached the final for the first time, losing to Fahey and Tara Lumley 6/4 6/5, the closest scoreline in a Ladies World Championship final. Van Der Zwalmen also competed in the US Open for the second time, reaching the finals of the singles and doubles draws.

In 2024, Van Der Zwalmen captained the Rest of the World team in the second edition of the Ladies Bathurst Cup at the Royal Melbourne Tennis Club. She won all 4 of her main draw matches against Great Britain, and partnered with Bollerman to defeat Tara Lumley and Georgie Willis in the deciding doubles to win the trophy for the Rest of the World. On the same tour, Van Der Zwalmen made her debut at the women's Australian Open in Hobart and the men's Australian Amateur at the same venue, reaching the final in the former. At that year's French Open, she reached the finals of both the singles and doubles. She also once again made the final of the Raquette d'Or.

In 2025, Van Der Zwalmen became the second female player to compete in the main draw of an Open, losing in the first round of the Australian Open to Chris Chapman. In the women's draw, she reached her second Australian Open final in both singles and doubles. At the 2025 US Open she reached the final of the singles draw and won the doubles draw with Annie Clark in the latter's Open debut, defeating Fahey and Jo See Tan in the final. It was Van Der Zwalmen's second Open doubles title.

=== Padel tennis ===
Since moving to Bordeaux, Van Der Zwalmen has also started playing padel tournaments and competes in P250 and P500 women tournaments.

== Performance timeline ==
=== Women's singles ===
Key
W	F	SF	QF	#R	RR	Q#	DNQ	A	NH

(W) winner; (F) finalist; (SF) semifinalist; (QF) quarterfinalist; (#R) rounds 4, 3, 2, 1; (RR) round-robin stage; (Q#) qualification round; (DNQ) did not qualify; (A) absent; (NH) not held; (SR) strike rate (events won / competed); (W–L) win–loss record.
To avoid confusion and double counting, these charts are updated at the conclusion of a tournament or when the player's participation has ended.

Current through the 2025 World Championship

Tournament	2017	2018	2019	2020	2021	2022	2023	2024	2025	SR	W–L	Win %
World Championship
World Championship	NH	A	NH			F	F	NH	F	0 / 3	6–3	67%
Win–loss	0–0	0–0	0–0	0–0	0–0	2–1	3–1	0–0	1–1	0 / 3	6–3	67%
Grand Slam tournaments
Australian Open	A	A	A	A	NH	A	A	F	F	0 / 2	4–2	67%
British Open	A	SF	F	NH		A	A	A	A	0 / 2	4–2	67%
French Open	QF	F	A	NH		F	F	F		0 / 5	6–5	55%
US Open	A	A	SF	NH		A	F	A	F	0 / 3	5–3	63%
Win–loss	0–1	4–2	3–2	0–0	0–0	1–1	4–2	3–2	4–2	0 / 12	19–12	61%
IRTPA Sanctioned Tournaments
Win–loss	0–0	0–0	0–0	0–0	0–0	0–0	0–0	0–0	0–0	0 / 0	0–0	–
Career Statistics
	2017	2018	2019	2020	2021	2022	2023	2024	2025	Career		
Tournaments	1	2	2	0	0	2	3	2	3	Career total: 15		
Titles	0	0	0	0	0	0	0	0	0	Career total: 0		
Finals	0	1	1	0	0	2	3	2	3	Career total: 12		
Overall win–loss	0–1	4–2	3–2	0–0	0–0	3–2	7–3	3–2	5–3	25–15		63%
Win %	0%	67%	60%	–	–	60%	70%	60%	63%	Career total: 63%		

=== Open singles ===
Tournament	2019	2020	2021	2022	2023	2024	2025	SR	W–L	Win %
Grand Slam tournaments
Australian Open	A	A	NH	A	A	A	1R	0 / 1	0–1	0%
British Open	Q1	NH	A	A	A	A		0 / 0	0–0	–
Win–loss	0–0	0–0	0–0	0–0	0–0	0–0	0–1	0 / 1	0–1	0%
Career Statistics
	2019	2020	2021	2022	2023	2024	2025	Career		
Tournaments	0	0	0	0	0	0	1	Career total: 1		
Titles	0	0	0	0	0	0	0	Career total: 0		
Finals	0	0	0	0	0	0	0	Career total: 0		
Overall win–loss	0–0	0–0	0–0	0–0	0–0	0–0	0–1	0–1		0%
Win %	–	–	–	–	–	–	0%	Career total: 0%		

=== Women's doubles ===
Tournament	2017	2018	2019	2020	2021	2022	2023	2024	2025	SR	W–L	Win %
World Championship
World Championship	A	NH	A	NH		A	F	A	F	0 / 2	4–2	67%
Win–loss	0–0	0–0	0–0	0–0	0–0	0–0	3–1	0–0	1–1	0 / 2	4–2	67%
Grand Slam tournaments
Australian Open	A	A	A	A	NH		A	F	F	0 / 2	2–2	50%
British Open	A	SF	F	NH		A	A	A	A	0 / 2	3–2	60%
French Open	F	F	A	NH		W	F	F		1 / 5	5–3	63%
US Open	A	F	A	NH		A	F	A	W	1 / 3	5–1	83%
Win–loss	1–1	3–1	2–1	0–0	0–0	1–0	2–2	2–2	4–1	2 / 12	15–8	65%
IRTPA Sanctioned Tournaments
Win–loss	0–0	0–0	0–0	0–0	0–0	0–0	0–0	0–0	0–0	0 / 0	0–0	–
Career Statistics
	2017	2018	2019	2020	2021	2022	2023	2024	2025	Career		
Tournaments	1	3	1	0	0	1	3	2	3	Career total: 14		
Titles	0	0	0	0	0	1	0	0	1	Career total: 2		
Finals	1	0	1	0	0	1	3	2	3	Career total: 11		
Overall win–loss	1–1	3–1	2–1	0–0	0–0	1–0	5–3	2–2	5–2	19–10		66%
Win %	50%	75%	67%	–	–	100%	63%	50%	71%	Career total: 66%		
