= 2024 Champions Trophy (real tennis) =

- Date: 30 July-4 August
- Edition: 6th
- Category: IRTPA
- Draw: 8S / 8Q
- Location: Hampton Court Palace, London, United Kingdom
- Venue: Royal Tennis Court

Champions

Men's singles
- (Australia) Nick Howell
- Champions Trophy (real tennis)

The 2024 Champions Trophy was the 6th edition of the Champions Trophy. It was held at the Royal Tennis Court from 30 July to 4 August. It was a qualifying event for the 2025 Real Tennis World Championship.

The format of the event was modified from previous versions. The match format was reduced from a best-of-5 set to a best-of-3 set format, with the qualifying expanded from one group of four to two groups of four. Defending champion John Lumley did not return to defend his title. World Champion Camden Riviere was also not in attendance. The event was won by Nick Howell, his first Champions Trophy title. Howell beat Ben Taylor-Matthews in the final, his fourth Champions Trophy final. Both finalists lost in the first round and had to play through the repechage matches against qualifiers.

== Draw and results ==
Amateur players are marked as (A)

=== Qualifying ===
The qualifying was split over two groups, with the winners of each group progressing to the main draw.

==== Group A ====
		(United Kingdom) Williams	(United Kingdom) Long	(United Kingdom) Hamilton	(United Kingdom) Merola	W–L	Set W–L	Game W–L	Standings
8	(United Kingdom) L Williams		9/6	9/3	3/9	2–1	2–1 (67%)	21–18 (54%)	2nd
9	(United Kingdom) D Long	6/9		9/5	8/9	1–2	1–2 (33%)	23–24 (49%)	3rd
11	(United Kingdom) V Hamilton	3/9	5/9		5/9	0–3	0–3 (0%)	13–27 (33%)	4th
13	(United Kingdom) N Merola (Q)	9/3	9/8	9/5		3–0	3–0 (100%)	27–16 (63%)	1st

==== Group B ====
		(United Kingdom) Shenkman	(United Kingdom) Gale	(United Kingdom) Mackenzie	(United Kingdom) Gordon	W–L	Set W–L	Game W–L	Standings
7	(United Kingdom) R Shenkman (Q, A)		9/2	9/0	9/0	3–0	3–0 (100%)	27–2 (93%)	1st
10	(United Kingdom) L Gale	2/9		9/0	9/2	2–1	2–1 (67%)	20–11 (65%)	2nd
12	(United Kingdom) N Mackenzie	0/9	0/9		2/9	0–3	0–3 (0%)	2–27 (7%)	4th
14	(United Kingdom) L Gordon	0/9	2/9	9/2		1–2	1–2 (33%)	11–20 (35%)	3rd

=== Main Draw ===
The Champions Trophy operates a repechage format for the first four seeds, where the first round losers progress to a second quarter final against the winners between the fifth and sixth seeds and the qualifiers.

First quarter finals
1	(Australia) N Howell	4	6	3
3	(Australia) R Fahey	6	1	6
5	(United Kingdom) B Sayers	2
Q	(United Kingdom) N Merola	6
6	(United Kingdom) L Smart	2	1
Q	(United Kingdom) R Shenkman (A)	6	6
4	(Australia) S Virgona	6	2	6
2	(United Kingdom) B Taylor-Matthews	4	6	5

Second quarter finals
1	(Australia) N Howell	6	6
Q	(United Kingdom) N Merola	3	1
Q	(United Kingdom) R Shenkman (A)	3	2
2	(United Kingdom) B Taylor-Matthews	6	6

Semi finals
3	(Australia) R Fahey	5	4
2	(United Kingdom) B Taylor-Matthews	6	6
1	(Australia) N Howell	6	6
4	(Australia) S Virgona	3	4

Final
2	(United Kingdom) B Taylor-Matthews	6	2	4
1	(Australia) N Howell	3	6	6
