= 2025 Australian Open (real tennis) =

- Date: 6-14 January
- Edition: 93nd (men); 35th (women)
- Category: IRTPA (men); None (women)
- Draw: 16S / 8D (men); 7S / 4D (women)
- Location: Hobart, Tasmania
- Venue: Hobart Real Tennis Club

Champions

Men's singles
- (United States) Camden Riviere

Women's singles
- (United Kingdom) Claire Fahey

Men's doubles
- (United States) Camden Riviere / (Australia) Chris Chapman

Women's doubles
- (United Kingdom) Claire Fahey / (Netherlands) Saskia Bollerman
← 2024 ·	Australian Open (real tennis)	· 2026 →

The 2025 Real Tennis Australian Open was the 93rd edition of the Australian Open. It was held at the Hobart Real Tennis Club in Hobart, Tasmania between January 6–14, 2025 and was organised by the Australian Real Tennis Association. The men's event was the first event in the qualifying series for the 2027 Real Tennis World Championship. The event was held alongside festivities for the 150th anniversary of the founding of the Hobart club. The men's draw was the first grand slam event of the year.

The men's singles draw was won by incumbent World Champion Camden Riviere in his return to the event after a five-year absence. He beat Australian amateur champion Kieran Booth in the final, the latter's second Open final appearance. It was Riviere's 32nd Open title, overtaking Penny Lumley to become the third most titled player, male or female. Defending men's champion John Lumley did return to defend his title. World Number 3 Nick Howell was originally due to play, but withdrew prior to the start of the tournament. Riviere also won the doubles draw with Chris Chapman. The women's singles draw was won by incumbent World Champion Claire Fahey, beating Lea Van Der Zwalmen in the final. It was Fahey's 44th Open title, maintaining an unbeaten run in all women's competitions in Australia. Fahey also won the doubles title with Saskia Bollerman, having also won the 2016, 2017 and 2018 editions together.

== Draw and results ==
Amateur players are marked as (A)

=== Men's Singles Qualifying ===
==== First Qualifier ====
First Round				Final
				1	(Australia) T Blom (A)	1	1
(Australia) S Legg (A)	5	6	2		(Australia) D Webster-Jones (A)	6	6
(Australia) D Webster-Jones (A)	6	3	6

=== Men's Singles ===
First round
1	(United States) C Riviere	6	6	6
(Australia) N Stenning (A)	0	0	0
(Australia) J Pastoor	2	2	3
7	(Australia) J Woods-Casey	6	6	6
8	(Australia) O Pridmore (A)	6	6	6
LL	(Australia) T Blom (A)	0	1	1
(France) B Huynh-Lenhardt	0	3	4
4	(Australia) R Fahey	6	6	6
3	(Australia) C Chapman	6	6	6
(France) L Van Der Zwalmen (A)	1	2	4
Q	(Australia) D Webster-Jones (A)	1	1	0
6	(Australia) K Booth (A)	6	6	6
5	(United Kingdom) L Williams	3	6	6	6
(United Kingdom) C Fahey	6	2	5	4
(United Kingdom) W Flynn	2	0	0
2	(United Kingdom) B Taylor-Matthews	6	6	6

Quarter-finals
1	(United States) C Riviere	6	6	6
7	(Australia) J Woods-Casey	1	1	0
8	(Australia) O Pridmore (A)	1	5	2
3	(Australia) R Fahey	6	6	6
4	(Australia) C Chapman	4	4	2
6	(Australia) K Booth (A)	6	6	6
5	(United Kingdom) L Williams	2	3	5
2	(United Kingdom) B Taylor-Matthews	6	6	6

Semi-finals
1	(United States) C Riviere	6	6	6
4	(Australia) R Fahey	0	5	3
6	(Australia) K Booth (A)	6	2	6	6
2	(United Kingdom) B Taylor-Matthews	2	6	0	3

Final
1	(United States) C Riviere	6	6	6
6	(Australia) K Booth (A)	1	1	1

=== Men's Doubles ===
Quarterfinals
1	(United States) C Riviere (Australia) C Chapman	6	6	6
(Australia) S Legg (A) (France) B Huynh-Lenhardt	1	0	1
(Australia) N Stenning (A) (Australia) D Webster-Jones (A)	3	3	2
3	(United Kingdom) L Williams (Australia) J Woods-Casey	6	6	6
4	(Australia) K Booth (A) (Australia) O Pridmore (A)	6	6	6
(United Kingdom) C Fahey (United Kingdom) W Flynn (A)	2	3	1
(Australia) T Blom (A) (Australia) J Pastoor	0	0	1
2	(Australia) R Fahey (United Kingdom) B Taylor-Matthews	6	6	6

Semifinals
1	(United States) C Riviere (Australia) C Chapman	6	6	6
3	(United Kingdom) L Williams (Australia) J Woods-Casey	1	2	1
4	(Australia) K Booth (A) (Australia) O Pridmore (A)	1	4	3
2	(Australia) R Fahey (United Kingdom) B Taylor-Matthews	6	6	6

Finals
1	(United States) C Riviere (Australia) C Chapman	5	6	6	3	6
2	(Australia) R Fahey (United Kingdom) B Taylor-Matthews	6	1	0	6	0

=== Women's Singles ===
Note: all players are amateurs except Claire Fahey

Quarterfinals
(Australia) JS Tan	6	6
(Canada) J Siu	0	0
3	(Netherlands) S Bollerman	6	6
(United Kingdom) J Garside	1	1
(Australia) A Green	0	1
2	(France) L Van Der Zwalmen	6	6

Semifinals
1	(United Kingdom) C Fahey	6	6
(Australia) JS Tan	0	1
3	(Netherlands) S Bollerman	2	4
2	(France) L Van Der Zwalmen	6	6

Finals
1	(United Kingdom) C Fahey	6	6
2	(France) L Van Der Zwalmen	0	2

=== Women's Doubles ===
Note: all players are amateurs except Claire Fahey

Semifinals				Finals
1	(United Kingdom) C Fahey (Netherlands) S Bollerman	6	6
4	(Australia) JS Tan (Australia) X Ranger	0	0	1	(United Kingdom) C Fahey (Netherlands) S Bollerman	6	6
	(Australia) A Green (Canada) J Siu	0	1	2	(France) L Van Der Zwalmen (United Kingdom) J Garside	1	3
2	(France) L Van Der Zwalmen (United Kingdom) J Garside	6	6

== See also ==
- Grand Slam (real tennis)
