= 2019 British Open (real tennis) =

- Date: 17-26 November
- Edition: 41st
- Category: IRTPA
- Draw: 24S / 12D (men); 9S / 8D (women)
- Location: West Kensington, London, United Kingdom (men); Hayling Island, United Kingdom (women)
- Venue: Queen's Club (men); Radley College (men's qualifying); Seacourt Tennis Club (women)

Champions

Men's singles
- (United States) Camden Riviere

Women's singles
- (United Kingdom) Claire Fahey

Men's doubles
- (United States) Camden Riviere / (United Kingdom) John Lumley

Women's doubles
- (United Kingdom) Claire Fahey / (United Kingdom) Sarah Vigrass
| ← 2018 · | British Open (real tennis) | · 2021 → |

The 2019 Real Tennis British Open was the 41st edition of the British Open since it became an annual event in 1979. The men's event was held at the Queen's Club in London between November 17–26, 2019 and was organised by the Tennis and Rackets Association. It was the final qualifying event for the 2020 Real Tennis World Championship. The women's event was held at the Seacourt Tennis Club on Hayling Island between April 11–14, 2019. The men's draw was the fourth and final grand slam event of the year.

The men's singles draw was won by Camden Riviere, his fourth British Open title He beat defending champion Robert Fahey in the final, the first time he had defeated Fahey at the Queen's Club. In the doubles draw Riviere teamed up with John Lumley, repeating their partnership from the French Open. Riviere completed a calendar year grand slam for the second time, the first being in 2017. In the women's draw, Claire Fahey won her seventh British Open singles title, forming part of her sixth calendar year Grand Slam.

== Draw and results ==
Amateur players are marked as (A)

=== Men's Singles Qualifying ===
==== First Qualifier ====
| Qualifying Round 1 |
| (United States) F Bristowe | 6 | 6 |
| (France) L van der Zwalmen | 4 | 0 |

=== Men's Singles ===
First round
(United Kingdom) R Shenkman | 2 | 5 | 5
(United Kingdom) J Douglas | 6 | 6 | 6
(United Kingdom) J Giddins (A) | 3 | 3 | 6 | 6 | 6
(United Kingdom) N Mackenzie | 6 | 6 | 0 | 5 | 1
(United Kingdom) Z Eadle | 4 | 5 | 0
(United Kingdom) D Long | 6 | 6 | 6
(United Kingdom) R McNaughtan | 2 | 3 | 5
Q | (United States) F Bristowe | 6 | 6 | 6
(United Kingdom) A Flippence | 3 | 3 | 1
(United Kingdom) W Burns | 6 | 6 | 6
(United Kingdom) C Fahey | 6 | 6 | 6
(United Kingdom) L Danby (A) | 4 | 1 | 2
(United Kingdom) J Smith | 6 | 6 | 6
(United Kingdom) R Giddins (A) | 4 | 3 | 4
(United Kingdom) N Merola | 1 | 6 | 4 | 4
(United Kingdom) C Greenhalgh | 6 | 5 | 6 | 6

Second Round
1 | (United States) C Riviere | 6 | 6 | 6
(United Kingdom) J Douglas (A) | 2 | 1 | 0
7 | (United Kingdom) B Sayers | 6 | 6 | 6
(United Kingdom) J Giddins (A) | 1 | 0 | 2
5 | (Australia) N Howell | 6 | 6 | 6
(United Kingdom) D Long | 3 | 0 | 2
3 | (Australia) C Chapman | 6 | 6 | 6
(United States) F Bristowe (A) | 3 | 0 | 1
4 | (United Kingdom) B Taylor-Matthews | 6 | 6 | 6
(United Kingdom) W Burns | 0 | 0 | 1
6 | (United Kingdom) J Lumley | 6 | 6 | 6
(United Kingdom) C Fahey | 1 | 1 | 2
8 | (France) M Sarlangue (A) | 6 | 6 | 6
(United Kingdom) J Smith | 1 | 3 | 1
2 | (Australia) R Fahey | 4 | 6 | 6 | 6
(United Kingdom) C Greenhalgh | 6 | 1 | 1 | 1

Quarterfinals
1 | (United States) C Riviere | 6 | 6 | 6
7 | (United Kingdom) B Sayers | 3 | 1 | 2
5 | (Australia) N Howell | 2 | 4 | 4
3 | (Australia) C Chapman | 6 | 6 | 6
4 | (United Kingdom) B Taylor-Matthews | 6 | 5 | 6 | 6
6 | (United Kingdom) J Lumley | 5 | 6 | 2 | 4
8 | (France) M Sarlangue | 1 | 2 | 4
2 | (Australia) R Fahey | 6 | 6 | 6

Semifinals
1 | (United States) C Riviere | 6 | 6 | 6
3 | (Australia) C Chapman | 1 | 2 | 2
4 | (United Kingdom) B Taylor-Matthews | 6 | 6 | 6
2 | (Australia) R Fahey | 4 | 2 | 1

Finals
1 | (United States) C Riviere | 6 | 6 | 6
2 | (Australia) R Fahey | 3 | 3 | 2

=== Men's Doubles ===
First round
(United Kingdom) B Ronaldson (United Kingdom) A Lumsden (A) | 1 | 2 | 4
(United Kingdom) D Long (United Kingdom) R Shenkman (A) | 6 | 6 | 6
(United Kingdom) J Douglas (A) (United Kingdom) P Wright (A) | 6 | 6 | 6
(United Kingdom) Z Eadle (United Kingdom) A Dolman (A) | 5 | 2 | 5
(United Kingdom) N Merola (United Kingdom) A Player | 3 | 6 | 6 | 6
5 | (United Kingdom) R McNaughtan (United Kingdom) C Fahey | 6 | 5 | 5 | 3
(United Kingdom) W Burns (United Kingdom) J Dawes | 3 | 3 | 2
(United Kingdom) N Mackenzie (United Kingdom) J Smith | 6 | 6 | 6

Quarter-finals
1 | (United States) C Riviere (United Kingdom) J Lumley | 6 | 6 | 6
(United Kingdom) D Long (United Kingdom) R Shenkman (A) | 1 | 0 | 2
3 | (France) M Sarlangue (A) (Australia) C Chapman | 3 | 6 | 3 | 6 | 6
(United Kingdom) J Douglas (A) (United Kingdom) P Wright (A) | 6 | 1 | 6 | 4 | 3
4 | (United Kingdom) B Sayers (United Kingdom) B Taylor-Matthews | 6 | 6 | 6
5 | (United Kingdom) N Merola (United Kingdom) A Player | 2 | 5 | 2
2 | (Australia) R Fahey (Australia) N Howell | 6 | 6 | 6
(United Kingdom) N Mackenzie (United Kingdom) J Smith | 1 | 4 | 1

Semi-finals
1 | (United States) C Riviere (United Kingdom) J Lumley | 6 | 6 | 6
3 | (France) M Sarlangue (A) (Australia) C Chapman | 1 | 0 | 1
4 | (United Kingdom) B Sayers (United Kingdom) B Taylor-Matthews | 3 | 6 | 3 | 2
2 | (Australia) R Fahey (Australia) N Howell | 6 | 0 | 6 | 6

Final
1 | (United States) C Riviere (United Kingdom) J Lumley | 6 | 6 | 6
2 | (Australia) R Fahey (Australia) N Howell | 4 | 3 | 1

=== Women's Singles ===
Note: all players are amateurs except Claire Fahey

First round
(United Kingdom) J Garside | 6 | 6
(United Kingdom) A Pye | 0 | 1
3 | (United Kingdom) T Lumley | 6 | 6
(United Kingdom) C Bucknell | 1 | 0
(United Kingdom) N Barber | 1 | 1
(United Kingdom) A Garside | 6 | 6

Second round
1 | (United Kingdom) C Fahey
bye
(United Kingdom) J Garside | 3 | 2
4 | (United Kingdom) S Vigrass | 6 | 6
3 | (United Kingdom) T Lumley | 6 | 6
(United Kingdom) A Garside | 0 | 2
(United Kingdom) G Willis | 0 | 2
2 | (France) L van der Zwalmen | 6 | 6

Semifinals
1 | (United Kingdom) C Fahey | 6 | 6
4 | (United Kingdom) S Vigrass | 0 | 2
3 | (United Kingdom) T Lumley | 1 | 6 | 0
2 | (France) L van der Zwalmen | 6 | 5 | 6

Finals
1 | (United Kingdom) C Fahey | 6 | 6
2 | (France) L van der Zwalmen | 3 | 3

=== Women's Doubles ===
Note: all players are amateurs except Claire Fahey

First round
(United Kingdom) A Pye (United Kingdom) C Nicholls | 6 | 6
(United Kingdom) R Law (United Kingdom) D Wilson | 1 | 1
(United Kingdom) C Bucknell (United Kingdom) I Hunt | 6 | 6
(United Kingdom) C MacDowell (United Kingdom) O Boulton | 0 | 0
(United Kingdom) G Willis (United Kingdom) N Barber | 6 | 6
(United Kingdom) D Oldland (United Kingdom) L Ford | 0 | 0

Second round
1 | (United Kingdom) C Fahey (United Kingdom) T Lumley
bye
(United Kingdom) A Garside (United Kingdom) K Leppard | 6 | 6
(United Kingdom) A Pye (United Kingdom) C Nicholls | 1 | 1
(United Kingdom) P Lumley (United Kingdom) T Lumley | 6 | 6
(United Kingdom) C Bucknell (United Kingdom) I Hunt | 0 | 1
(United Kingdom) G Willis (United Kingdom) N Barber | 3 | 1
2 | (France) L van der Zwalmen (United Kingdom) J Garside | 6 | 6

Semifinals
1 | (United Kingdom) C Fahey (United Kingdom) S Vigrass | 6 | 6
(United Kingdom) K Leppard (United Kingdom) A Garside | 0 | 0
(United Kingdom) P Lumley (United Kingdom) T Lumley | 3 | 0
2 | (France) L van der Zwalmen (United Kingdom) J Garside | 6 | 6

Finals
1 | (United Kingdom) C Fahey (United Kingdom) S Vigrass | 6 | 6
2 | (France) L van der Zwalmen (United Kingdom) J Garside | 4 | 3

== See also ==
- Grand Slam (real tennis)
