= Jo See Tan =

Australian real tennis player

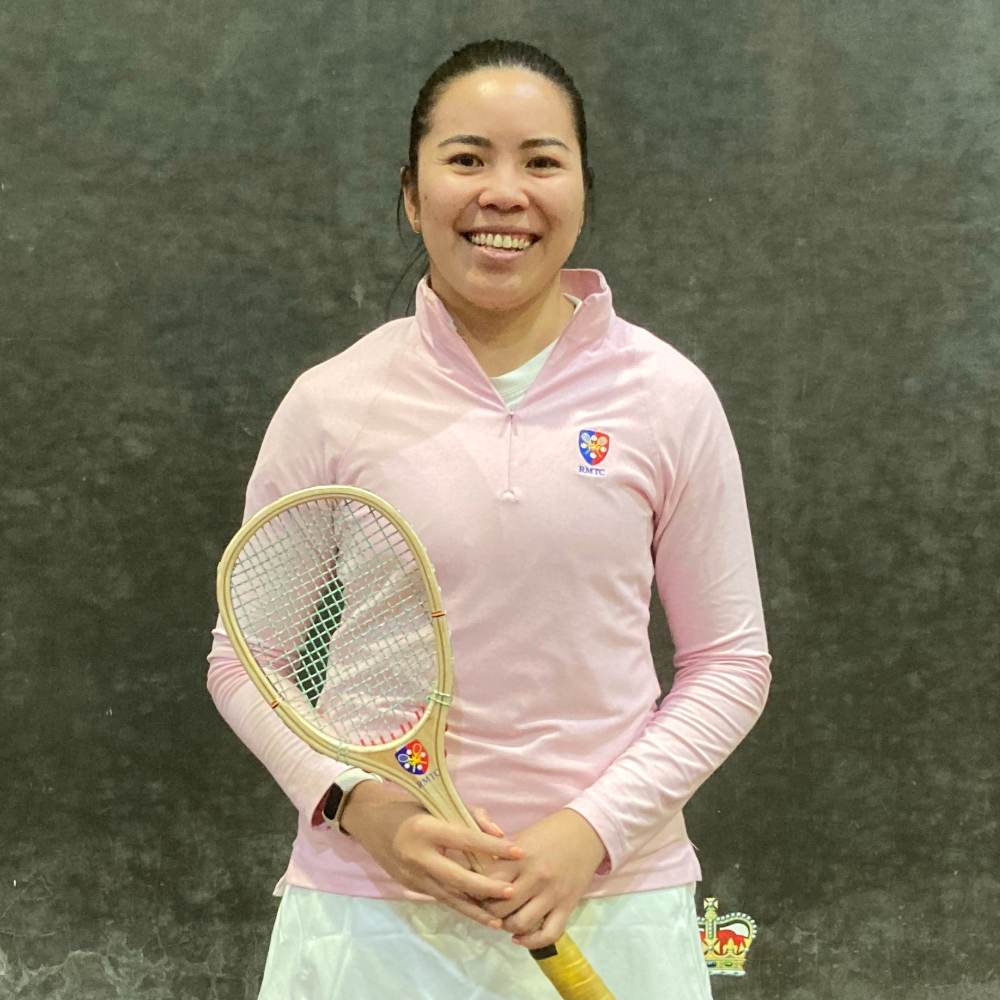
- Tan at the 2023 British Open
- Full name: Jo See Tan
- Country (sports): Australia
- Residence: Australia
- Plays: Left-handed
- Club: Royal Melbourne Tennis Club

World Championships
- Ladies Singles: QF (2019)
- Ladies Doubles: SF (2019, 2023)

Singles
- Career titles: 1
- Highest ranking: 12
- Current ranking: 12

Grand Slam singles results
- Australian Open: W (2022)
- British Open: QF (2023)
- French Open: QF (2022, 2023)
- US Open: F (2024)

Doubles
- Career titles: 1
- Current ranking: 13

Grand Slam doubles results
- Australian Open: W (2023)
- French Open: SF (2023)
- British Open: SF (2023)
- US Open: F (2024, 2025)

Jo See Tan (born March 1991) is an Australian amateur real tennis player. Her best result was winning the 2022 Australian Open Singles championship and the 2023 Australian Open Doubles championship. She has also been a finalist at the US Open on one occasion in singles and two occasions in doubles. She has represented Australia at the Bathurst Cup on two occasions, and has won the women's Australian Amateur on three occasions.

== Career ==
Tan began playing real tennis at the Royal Melbourne Tennis Club in 2015 at the invitation of club professional John Woods-Casey. Tan progressed quickly through the club ranks, winning the B division of the Australian Amateur in 2016. Tan made her Open debut at the 2017 Australian Open, where she lost in the first round to Prue McCahey. Tan made her international debut at the 2017 Ladies World Championship in Tuxedo, where she won her first round match, but lost in the second round to World Champion Claire Fahey. In the doubles, Tan reached the quarter final, losing to the mother-daughter pair and eventual tournament runners-up of Penny and Tara Lumley. Later that year, she won her first Australian Amateur singles championship.

In 2018, Tan played in the Australian Open again, but lost in the first round to Isabel Candy, and failed to defend her Australian Amateur championship. Similarly, 2019 she failed to pass the first round at the Australian Open, losing to Jess Garside. The 2019 Ladies World Championship was held in Ballarat in Tan's home country. Tan lost her first round singles match to Becca Lunnon, but reached the semi finals of the doubles partnered with Isabel Hunt. She also won the plate competition.

After a break from tournaments due to the COVID-19 pandemic, Tan won her first Open championship at the delayed 2022 Australian Open, comfortably beating Emma Clyde, who she had previously beaten in the final travel-restricted 2022 Melbourne Open. She also won her second Australian Amateur in 2022, defeating Becca Lunnon. Later in the season, she made her French Open debut, losing in three sets to Nicola Doble in the first round. She then represented the Rest of the World at the inaugural women's Bathurst Cup against Great Britain but failed to win any matches.

At the 2023 Australian Open, Tan earned her biggest scalp of her career, defeating Australian professional Kate Leeming in the semi final in three sets. In the final, she lost to Dutch Champion Saskia Bollerman. Playing with Bollerman, she won the doubles draw, Tan's first doubles title. In March, she made her British Open debut, winning through the first two rounds before falling to Tara Lumley in the quarter final. In the doubles, Tan partnered former World Champion Penny Lumley and reached the semi final, losing to eventual champions Claire Fahey and Tara Lumley. The following month, she played in the 2023 Ladies Real Tennis World Championship at The Oratory School. She won through the first two rounds before losing to Georgie Willis in the quarter final. However, in the doubles she and Penny Lumley reached the semi final, again running into Fahey and Tara Lumley. At the end of the season, she returned to the French Open, losing her quarter final to Lea van der Zwalmen. She also won her third Australian Amateur title.

In 2024, Tan again represented the Rest of the World at the Bathurst Cup, held at Tan's home club of Melbourne. Tan won one of her singles fixtures against Nicola Doble, but lost her other against Georgie Willis. At the subsequent Australian Open, she reached the quarter final stage. Later that year, Tan made her US Open debut in Tuxedo, where she reached her third career final, losing in straight sets to Claire Fahey.

In 2025, she reached the semi finals of both the singles and doubles draws of the Australian Open, losing both to Fahey in straight sets. She partnered with Fahey for the doubles draw at the 2025 US Open where they lost the final to Lea Van Der Zwalmen and Annie Clark in three sets. Tan lost to Fahey in the singles semi final.

== Performance Timeline ==
=== Women's Singles ===
Key
W	F	SF	QF	#R	RR	Q#	DNQ	A	NH

(W) winner; (F) finalist; (SF) semifinalist; (QF) quarterfinalist; (#R) rounds 4, 3, 2, 1; (RR) round-robin stage; (Q#) qualification round; (DNQ) did not qualify; (A) absent; (NH) not held; (SR) strike rate (events won / competed); (W–L) win–loss record.
To avoid confusion and double counting, these charts are updated at the conclusion of a tournament or when the player's participation has ended.

Current through the 2025 US Open

Tournament	2017	2018	2019	2020	2021	2022	2023	2024	2025	SR	W–L	Win %
World Championship
World Championship	4R	A	QF	NH		A	4R	NH		0 / 3	3–3	50%
Win–loss	1–1	0–0	0–1	0–0	0–0	0–0	2–1	0–0	0–0	0 / 3	3–3	50%
Grand Slam tournaments
Australian Open	1R	1R	QF	A	NH	W	F	QF	SF	1 / 7	5–6	45%
British Open	A	A	A	NH		A	QF	A		0 / 1	2–1	67%
French Open	A	A	A	NH		QF	QF	A		0 / 2	0–2	0%
US Open	A	A	A	NH		A	A	F	SF	0 / 2	4–2	67%
Win–loss	0–1	0–1	0–1	0–0	0–0	1–1	4–3	3–2	3–2	1 / 12	11–11	50%
Career Statistics
	2017	2018	2019	2020	2021	2022	2023	2024	2025	Career		
Tournaments	2	1	2	0	0	2	4	2	2	Career total: 15		
Titles	0	0	0	0	0	1	0	0	0	Career total: 1		
Finals	0	0	0	0	0	1	1	1	0	Career total: 3		
Overall win–loss	1–2	0–1	0–2	0–0	0–0	1–1	6–4	3–2	4–2	14–14		50%
Win %	33%	0%	0%	–	–	50%	60%	60%	60%	Career total: 50%		

=== Women's Doubles ===
Tournament	2017	2018	2019	2020	2021	2022	2023	2024	2025	SR	W–L	Win %
World Championship
World Championship	QF	NH	QF	NH		A	SF	A		0 / 3	4–3	57%
Win–loss	1–1	0–0	1–1	0–0	0–0	0–0	2–1	0–0	0–0	0 / 3	4–3	57%
Grand Slam tournaments
Australian Open	A	SF	QF	SF	NH		W	QF	SF	1 / 6	3–6	33%
British Open	A	A	A	NH		A	SF	A		0 / 1	2–1	67%
French Open	A	A	A	NH		A	SF	A		0 / 1	0–1	0%
US Open	A	A	A	NH		A	A	F	F	0 / 2	4–2	67%
Win–loss	0–0	0–1	0–2	1–1	0–0	0–0	4–2	2–2	2–2	1 / 10	8–10	44%
Career Statistics
	2017	2018	2019	2020	2021	2022	2023	2024	2025	Career		
Tournaments	1	1	2	1	0	0	4	2	2	Career total: 13		
Titles	0	0	0	0	0	0	1	0	0	Career total: 1		
Finals	0	0	0	0	0	0	1	1	1	Career total: 3		
Overall win–loss	1–1	0–1	1–3	1–1	0–0	0–0	6–3	2–2	2–2	13–13		50%
Win %	50%	0%	25%	50%	–	–	67%	50%	40%	Career total: 50%		
