= 2023 British Open (real tennis) =

- Date: 12-21 November (men); 29 March-2 April (women)
- Edition: 44th (men); 44th (women)
- Category: IRTPA (men); None (women)
- Draw: 24S / 12D (men); 15S / 11D (women)
- Location: West Kensington, London, United Kingdom (men); Hayling Island, United Kingdom (women)
- Venue: Queen's Club (men); Seacourt Tennis Club (women)

Champions

Men's singles
- (United States) Camden Riviere

Women's singles
- (United Kingdom) Claire Fahey

Men's doubles
- (United States) Camden Riviere / (United States) Tim Chisholm

Women's doubles
- (United Kingdom) Claire Fahey / (United Kingdom) Tara Lumley
← 2022 ·	British Open (real tennis)	· 2024 →

The 2023 Real Tennis British Open, branded as the Sir John Ritblat Foundation British Open for sponsorship reasons, was the 44th edition of the British Open since it became an annual event in 1979. The men's event was held at the Queen's Club in London between November 12–21, 2023 and was organised by the Tennis and Rackets Association, forming part of the qualifying series for the 2025 Real Tennis World Championship. The women's event was held at the Seacourt Tennis Club on Hayling Island between March 29 and April 2, 2023. The men's draw was the fourth and final grand slam event of the year.

The men's singles draw was won by incumbent World Champion Camden Riviere for the second consecutive year and his sixth overall. Riviere also won the men's doubles draw alongside Tim Chisholm. The women's singles draw was won by incumbent World Champion Claire Fahey, her eleventh British Open singles victory. She also won the doubles draw with Tara Lumley, the latter's first British Open title.

During the tournament, world number 5 Chris Chapman announced his retirement from international play.

== Draw and results ==
Amateur players are marked as (A)

=== Men's Singles Qualifying ===
==== First Qualifier ====
Final Qualifying Round
5	(United Kingdom) B Vallat (A)	6	6
	(United Kingdom) H Henman (A)	5	2

==== Second Qualifier ====
Qualifying Round 1			Final Qualifying Round
			6	(United Kingdom) M Hobbs	5	4
(United Kingdom) B Yorston (A)	6	6		(United Kingdom) B Yorston (A)	6	6
(United Kingdom) C Aley	0	1

==== Third Qualifier ====
Final Qualifying Round
3	(United Kingdom) N Merola	5	6	6
	(United Kingdom) M Trueman (A)	6	4	2

==== Fourth Qualifier ====
Qualifying Round 1			Final Qualifying Round
			4	(United Kingdom) W Flynn (A)	6	6
(United Kingdom) V Hamilton (A)	6	6		(United Kingdom) V Hamilton	2	4
(United Kingdom) A Player	4	3

=== Men's Singles ===
First round
(United Kingdom) L Gordon	6	0	4	6	0
Q	(United Kingdom) N Merola	2	6	6	5	6
Q	(United Kingdom) B Vallat (A)	6	6	3	6
(Australia) J Woods-Casey	3	3	6	4
(United Kingdom) R Shenkman (A)	6	6	6
Q	(United Kingdom) B Yorston	2	5	3
LL	(United Kingdom) M Hobbs	0	1	1
(United Kingdom) D Long	6	6	6
(United Kingdom) N Mackenzie	3	4	5
(United Kingdom) L Gale	6	6	6
(United Kingdom) J Smith	6	6	3	3	2
(United Kingdom) L Williams	1	2	6	6	6
(United Kingdom) Z Eadle	6	6	1	3	6
Q	(United Kingdom) W Flynn (A)	3	4	6	6	5
(United Kingdom) C Fahey	3	2	3
(Australia) O Pridmore (A)	6	6	6

Second Round
1	(United States) C Riviere	5	6	6	6
Q	(United Kingdom) N Merola	6	2	1	2
5	(Australia) S Virgona	6	6	6
Q	(United Kingdom) B Vallat (A)	2	1	0
7	(United Kingdom) L Smart	4	6	4	4
(United Kingdom) R Shenkman (A)	6	3	6	6
4	(Australia) N Howell	6	2	3	6	6
(United Kingdom) D Long	5	6	6	1	2
3	(United Kingdom) B Taylor-Matthews	6	6	4	5	6
(United Kingdom) L Gale	4	4	6	6	4
6	(United Kingdom) B Sayers	6	6	6
(United Kingdom) L Williams	4	1	3
8	(France) M Sarlangue (A)	6	3	6	6
(United Kingdom) Z Eadle	5	6	2	4
2	(United Kingdom) J Lumley	6	6	6
(Australia) O Pridmore (A)	2	0	2

Quarterfinals
1	(United States) C Riviere	6	6	6
5	(Australia) S Virgona	4	4	0
(United Kingdom) R Shenkman (A)	2	6	0	2
4	(Australia) N Howell	6	3	6	6
3	(United Kingdom) B Taylor-Matthews	2	5	2
6	(United Kingdom) B Sayers	6	6	6
8	(France) M Sarlangue (A)	0	1	2
2	(United Kingdom) J Lumley	6	6	6

Semifinals
1	(United States) C Riviere	6	6	6
4	(Australia) N Howell	5	2	3
6	(United Kingdom) B Sayers	6	2	1	6	1
2	(United Kingdom) J Lumley	5	6	6	5	6

Finals
1	(United States) C Riviere	6	4	6	6
2	(United Kingdom) J Lumley	3	6	1	4

=== Men's Doubles Qualifying ===
==== First Qualifier ====
Final Qualifying Round
1	(United Kingdom) W Flynn (A) (Australia) O Pridmore (A)	6	6
	(United Kingdom) V Hamilton (United Kingdom) B Vallat (A)	2	1

==== Second Qualifier ====
Final Qualifying Round
2	(United Kingdom) A Dolman (A) (United Kingdom) N Mackenzie	2	2
	(United Kingdom) H Henman (A) (United Kingdom) N Merola	6	6

=== Men's Doubles ===
First round
(United Kingdom) A Player (Australia) J Woods-Casey	4	0	2
Q	(United Kingdom) H Henman (A) (United Kingdom) N Merola	6	6	6
5	(United Kingdom) Z Eadle (United Kingdom) L Smart	6	2	3	6	1
(United Kingdom) C Fahey (United Kingdom) L Gordon	5	6	6	5	6
(United Kingdom) J Douglas (A) (United Kingdom) P Wright (A)
6	(United Kingdom) D Long (United Kingdom) R Shenkman (A)	w/o
Q	(United Kingdom) W Flynn (A) (Australia) O Pridmore (A)	2	6	2	4
(United Kingdom) L Gale (United Kingdom) L Williams	6	2	6	6

Quarter-finals
1	(United States) T Chisholm (United States) C Riviere	5	6	6	6
Q	(United Kingdom) H Henman (A) (United Kingdom) N Merola	6	0	2	1
3	(United Kingdom) J Lumley (Australia) S Virgona	6	6	6
(United Kingdom) C Fahey (United Kingdom) L Gordon	1	1	0
4	(United Kingdom) B Sayers (United Kingdom) B Taylor-Matthews	6	6	6
6	(United Kingdom) D Long (United Kingdom) R Shenkman (A)	1	1	1
2	(Australia) R Fahey (Australia) N Howell	6	6	6
(United Kingdom) L Gale (United Kingdom) L Williams	5	3	0

Semi-finals
1	(United States) T Chisholm (United States) C Riviere	6	6	6
3	(United Kingdom) J Lumley (Australia) S Virgona	5	3	4
4	(United Kingdom) B Sayers (United Kingdom) B Taylor-Matthews	3	4	1
2	(Australia) R Fahey (Australia) N Howell	6	6	6

Final
1	(United States) T Chisholm (United States) C Riviere	6	6	6
2	(Australia) R Fahey (Australia) N Howell	3	1	2

=== Women's Singles ===
Note: all players are amateurs except Claire Fahey

First Round
(United Kingdom) O Boulton	6	6
(United Kingdom) V Harvey	4	4
(United Kingdom) M Eastwood	0	0
(United Kingdom) S Dannreuther	6	6
(United Kingdom) S Sullivan	0	0
(United Kingdom) J Tomlinson	6	6
(Estonia) U Petti	4	4
(United Kingdom) S Lewis	6	6
(United Kingdom) T Machin	6	6
(United Kingdom) I Harvey	2	2
(Australia) JS Tan	6	6
(United Kingdom) A Oldham	1	2
(United Kingdom) J Taylor	0	0
(United Kingdom) J Garside	6	6

Second Round
1	(United Kingdom) C Fahey
bye
bye
bye
(United Kingdom) O Boulton	1	1
5	(United Kingdom) G Willis	6	6
(United Kingdom) S Dannreuther	2	1
4	(United Kingdom) N Doble	6	6
3	(Netherlands) S Bollerman	6	6
(United Kingdom) J Tomlinson	0	0
(United Kingdom) S Lewis	2	2
6	(Latvia) I Dulbish	6	6
(United Kingdom) T Machin	0	1
(Australia) JS Tan	6	6
(United Kingdom) J Garside	6	1	2
2	(United Kingdom) T Lumley	2	6	6

Quarter Finals
1	(United Kingdom) C Fahey
bye
5	(United Kingdom) G Willis	6	6
4	(United Kingdom) N Doble	3	2
3	(Netherlands) S Bollerman	6	6
6	(Latvia) I Dulbish	4	3
(Australia) JS Tan	0	2
2	(United Kingdom) T Lumley	6	6

Semi Finals
1	(United Kingdom) C Fahey	6	6
5	(United Kingdom) G Willis	0	0
3	(Netherlands) S Bollerman	3	4
(United Kingdom) T Lumley	6	6

Final
1	(United Kingdom) C Fahey	6	6
2	(United Kingdom) T Lumley	1	0

=== Women's Doubles ===
Note: all players are amateurs except Claire Fahey

First round
(United Kingdom) C Nicholls (United Kingdom) L Hutchinson
(United Kingdom) S Lewis (United Kingdom) M Eastwood	w/o
(United Kingdom) D Wilson (United Kingdom) R Law	0	0
4	(Australia) JS Tan (United Kingdom) P Lumley	6	6
3	(United Kingdom) N Doble (United Kingdom) G Willis	6	6
(United Kingdom) O Boulton (United Kingdom) I Harvey	2	0
(United Kingdom) A Oldham (United Kingdom) S Dannreuther	1	4
5	(United Kingdom) A Garside (Latvia) I Dulbish	6	6
(France) B Bidouze (United Kingdom) S Sullivan	3	2
(United Kingdom) J Taylor (United Kingdom) T Machin	6	6

Second round
1	(United Kingdom) C Fahey (United Kingdom) T Lumley
bye
(United Kingdom) S Lewis (United Kingdom) M Eastwood	2	3
4	(Australia) JS Tan (United Kingdom) P Lumley	6	6
3	(United Kingdom) N Doble (United Kingdom) G Willis	6	6
5	(United Kingdom) A Garside (Latvia) I Dulbish	1	2
(United Kingdom) J Taylor (United Kingdom) T Machin	0	0
2	(Netherlands) S Bollerman (United Kingdom) J Garside	6	6

Semifinals
1	(United Kingdom) C Fahey (United Kingdom) T Lumley	6	6
4	(Australia) JS Tan (United Kingdom) P Lumley	0	0
3	(United Kingdom) N Doble (United Kingdom) G Willis	0	2
2	(Netherlands) S Bollerman (United Kingdom) J Garside	6	6

Finals
1	(United Kingdom) C Fahey (United Kingdom) T Lumley	6	6
2	(Netherlands) S Bollerman (United Kingdom) J Garside	0	1

== See also ==
- Grand Slam (real tennis)
