= Nino Merola =

British real tennis player

- Full name: Lucantonino Merola
- Country (sports): United Kingdom
- Residence: United Kingdom
- Born: 29 October 1991 (age 34)
- Plays: Right-handed
- Club: Radley College Real Tennis Club

Singles
- Career titles: 0
- Highest ranking: 11
- Current ranking: 11

Grand Slam singles results
- Australian Open: SF (2026)
- British Open: QF (2024)
- US Open: 2R (2018)

Doubles
- Career titles: 0
- Highest ranking: 13
- Current ranking: 13

Grand Slam doubles results
- Australian Open: SF (2026)
- British Open: SF (2024)
- US Open: SF (2025)

Lucantonio "Nino" Merola (born 29 October 1991) is a British professional real tennis player, currently working as the senior professional at Radley College. He is currently ranked eleventh in the world at singles and seventeenth in the world at doubles. His most notable results was reaching the singles semi-finals of the 2026 Australian Open, as well as the quarter finals of the 2024 Champions Trophy.

== Career ==
Merola discovered real tennis while working at Radley College. He worked spells at the International Tennis Club of Washington and the Seacourt Tennis Club before returning to Radley as the senior professional under Chris Ronaldson. Although he entered several major tournaments including the British Open and the US Open, he didn't proceed past the first round between 2016 and 2022.

Merola's breakout came at the 2023 British Open. Winning through qualifying, he beat Louis Gordon in the first round in five sets before taking a set off incumbent World Champion Camden Riviere, the lowest ranked player to do so in over 16 years. In the doubles draw of the same tournament, he and Henry Henman also took a set from Riviere and Tim Chisholm, the incumbent World Doubles Champions.

In 2024, he won the Category A Open in Manchester and was awarded the Most Valuable Player at the IRTPA Super League. He progressed through qualifying at the Champions Trophy and reached the second quarter finals, defeating Bryn Sayers in the first quarter final. At that year's British Open, he reached his first Open singles quarter final, defeating French amateur champion Matthieu Sarlangue in the round of 16. In the doubles, he partnered with Ben Taylor-Matthews and reached the semi final stage, taking another set off of Riviere and Chisholm in the process.

In 2025, Merola reached his first doubles semi final at the US Open, again partnered with Taylor-Matthews. They defeated Lewis Williams and Darren Long in the quarter final. Although he had a disappointing British Open, losing in the first round of both the singles and doubles, followed up at the 2026 Australian Open with the best result of his career, defeating third seed Nick Howell in the quarter-finals to reach his first career singles semi-final. He reached the doubles semi-finals of the same tournament, losing to eventual winners Howell and Steve Virgona.

== Performance timeline ==
=== Singles ===
Key
W	F	SF	QF	#R	RR	Q#	DNQ	A	NH

(W) winner; (F) finalist; (SF) semifinalist; (QF) quarterfinalist; (#R) rounds 4, 3, 2, 1; (RR) round-robin stage; (Q#) qualification round; (DNQ) did not qualify; (A) absent; (NH) not held; (SR) strike rate (events won / competed); (W–L) win–loss record.
To avoid confusion and double counting, these charts are updated at the conclusion of a tournament or when the player's participation has ended.

Current through the 2026 Australian Open

Tournament	2016	2017	2018	2019	2020	2021	2022	2023	2024	2025	2026	SR	W–L	Win %
Grand Slam tournaments
Australian Open	A	A	A	A	A	NH	A	1R	1R	A	SF	0 / 3	2–3	40%
British Open	A	A	Q1	1R	NH	1R	Q1	2R	QF	1R		0 / 5	3–5	38%
US Open	1R	1R	2R	A	A	A	A	Q2	A	2R		0 / 4	0–4	0%
Win–loss	0–1	0–1	0–1	0–1	0–0	0–1	0–0	1–2	2–2	0–2	2–1	0 / 12	5–12	29%
IRTPA Sanctioned Tournaments
Champions Trophy	NH	A	A	A	NH		A	A	QF	A		0 / 1	1–1	50%
IRTPA Championship	NH	A	Q1	1R	NH					A	NH	0 / 1	0–1	0%
US Pro	Q1	1R	1R	Q1	NH	A	A	A	A	1R		0 / 3	0–3	0%
Win–loss	0–0	0–1	0–1	0–1	0–0	0–0	0–0	0–0	1–1	0–1	0–0	0 / 5	1–5	17%
Career Statistics
	2016	2017	2018	2019	2020	2021	2022	2023	2024	2025	2026	Career		
Tournaments	1	2	2	2	0	1	0	2	3	3	1	Career total: 17		
Titles	0	0	0	0	0	0	0	0	0	0	0	Career total: 0		
Finals	0	0	0	0	0	0	0	0	0	0	0	Career total: 0		
Overall win–loss	0–1	0–2	0–2	0–2	0–0	0–1	0–0	1–2	3–3	0–3	2–1	6–17		26%
Win %	0%	0%	0%	0%	–	0%	–	33%	50%	0%	67%	Career total: 26%		

=== Doubles ===
Tournament	2016	2017	2018	2019	2020	2021	2022	2023	2024	2025	SR	W–L	Win %
Grand Slam tournaments
Australian Open	A	Q1	A	A	A	NH	A	QF	QF	A	0 / 2	0–2	0%
British Open	A	A	Q1	QF	NH	Q1	1R	QF	SF	1R	0 / 5	3–5	38%
US Open	1R	Q1	1R	A	A	A	A	QF	A	SF	0 / 4	2–4	33%
Win–loss	0–1	0–0	0–1	1–1	0–0	0–0	0–1	2–3	1–2	1–2	0 / 11	5–11	31%
IRTPA Sanctioned Tournaments
IRTPA Championship	A	1R	QF	NH							0 / 2	2–2	50%
Win–loss	0–0	0–1	2–1	0–0	0–0	0–0	0–0	0–0	0–0	0–0	0 / 2	2–2	50%
Career Statistics
	2016	2017	2018	2019	2020	2021	2022	2023	2024	2025	Career		
Tournaments	1	1	2	1	0	0	1	3	2	2	Career total: 13		
Titles	0	0	0	0	0	0	0	0	0	0	Career total: 0		
Finals	0	0	0	0	0	0	0	0	0	0	Career total: 0		
Overall win–loss	0–1	0–1	2–2	1–1	0–0	0–0	0–1	2–3	1–2	1–2	7–13		35%
Win %	0%	0%	50%	50%	–	–	0%	40%	33%	33%	Career total: 35%		
