= 2022 French Open (real tennis) =

2022 Open de France du Jeu de Paume
- Date: 22 September-2 October
- Edition: 40th
- Category: IRTPA (men); None (women)
- Draw: 16S / 8D (men); 5S / 2D (women)
- Location: Paris, France
- Venue: Société Sportive du Jeu de Paume & de Racquets

Champions

Men's singles
- (United States) Camden Riviere

Women's singles
- (United Kingdom) Claire Fahey

Men's doubles
- (United States) Camden Riviere / (United Kingdom) John Lumley

Women's doubles
- (France) Lea van der Zwalmen / (Netherlands) Saskia Bollerman
← 2019 ·	Open de France du Jeu de Paume	· 2023 →

The 2022 French Open also known as the 2022 Open de France du Jeu de Paume was the 40th edition of the real tennis French Open. The event was held at the Société Sportive du Jeu de Paume & de Racquets in Paris between September 22 and October 2, 2022, and was organised by the Comité Français de Courte-Paume, forming part of the qualifying series for the 2023 Real Tennis World Championship. It was the first edition of the event since 2019, with the 2020 and 2021 events being cancelled due to the COVID-19 Pandmeic. The men's draw was the third grand slam event of the year.

The men's singles draw was won by defending champion Camden Riviere, his seventh French Open victory. The men's doubles draw was won by Camden Riviere and John Lumley, also defending their title. The women's singles draw was won by incumbent World Champion Claire Fahey. However she and partner Nicola Doble lost the doubles competition to Lea van der Zwalmen and Saskia Bollerman. It was the first time Fahey had lost a competitive women's match since 2009, and the first Open doubles title by van der Zwalmen. It would be the last French Open appearance by 2018 champion Chris Chapman before his retirement from international competitions. Robert Shenkman made his French Open debut.

== Draw and results ==
Amateur players are marked as (A)

=== Men's Singles Qualifying ===
==== First Qualifier ====
Final Qualifying Round
(France) N Victoir (A)	6	6
(United Kingdom) P Wright	3	0

==== Second Qualifier ====
Final Qualifying Round
(United Kingdom) L Williams	3	6	6
(Australia) J Woods-Casey	6	3	4

=== Men's Singles ===
First round
1	(United States) C Riviere	6	6	6
(United Kingdom) D Long	0	1	2
Q	(France) N Victoir (A)	1	4	0
(United Kingdom) B Sayers	6	6	6
6	(Australia) N Howell	6	4	6	6
(United Kingdom) L Smart	1	6	4	4
(United Kingdom) J Smith	0	5	1
4	(United Kingdom) B Taylor-Matthews	6	6	6
3	(United Kingdom) J Lumley	6	6	6
Q	(United Kingdom) L Williams	2	0	2
(United Kingdom) L Gale	2	4	3
5	(Australia) C Chapman	6	6	6
(United Kingdom) N Mackenzie	6	3	4	1
(France) M Sarlangue (A)	3	6	6	6
(United Kingdom) R Shenkman (A)	4	5	6	0
2	(Australia) R Fahey	6	6	3	6

Quarter-finals
1	(United States) C Riviere	6	6	6
(United Kingdom) B Sayers	0	1	2
6	(Australia) N Howell	3	6	6	6
4	(United Kingdom) B Taylor-Matthews	6	5	4	1
4	(United Kingdom) J Lumley	4	3	5
(Australia) C Chapman	6	6	6
(France) M Sarlangue (A)	5	6	0	4
2	(Australia) R Fahey	6	3	6	6

Semi-finals
1	(United States) C Riviere	6	6	6
6	(Australia) N Howell	3	3	2
5	(Australia) C Chapman	6	6	6
2	(Australia) R Fahey	3	1	2

Final
1	(United States) C Riviere	6	6	6
5	(Australia) C Chapman	2	2	2

=== Men's Doubles ===
Quarterfinals
1	(United States) C Riviere (United Kingdom) J Lumley	6	4
(United Kingdom) J Smith (United Kingdom) N Mackenzie	1	1
(France) M Sarlangue (A) (United Kingdom) R McNaughtan	6	2	1	6	3
3	(United Kingdom) B Sayers (United Kingdom) B Taylor-Matthews	2	6	6	5	6
4	(Australia) C Chapman (United Kingdom) L Smart	6	6	6
(United Kingdom) L Gale (Australia) J Woods-Casey	5	0	4
(United Kingdom) D Long (United Kingdom) R Shenkman (A)	3	0	0
2	(Australia) R Fahey (Australia) N Howell	6	6	6

Semifinals
1	(United States) C Riviere (United Kingdom) J Lumley	6	6	6
3	(United Kingdom) B Sayers (United Kingdom) B Taylor-Matthews	3	2	2
4	(Australia) C Chapman (United Kingdom) L Smart	1	6	1	2
2	(Australia) R Fahey (Australia) N Howell	6	5	6	6

Finals
1	(United States) C Riviere (United Kingdom) J Lumley	6	6	6
2	(Australia) R Fahey (Australia) N Howell	5	5	2

=== Women's Singles ===
Note: all players are amateurs except Claire Fahey

Quarterfinals				Semifinals				Finals
				1	(United Kingdom) C Fahey	6	6
					(Netherlands) S Bollerman	3	0
								1	(United Kingdom) C Fahey	6	6
(United Kingdom) N Doble	1	6	6					2	(France) L van der Zwalmen	1	0
(Australia) JS Tan	6	4	5		(United Kingdom) N Doble	1	0
				2	(France) L van der Zwalmen	6	6

=== Women's Doubles ===
Note: all players are amateurs except Claire Fahey

Finals
1	(United Kingdom) C Fahey (United Kingdom) N Doble	4	4
2	(Netherlands) S Bollerman (France) L van der Zwalmen	6	6

== See also ==
- Grand Slam (real tennis)
