= Lewis Williams (real tennis) =

British real tennis player

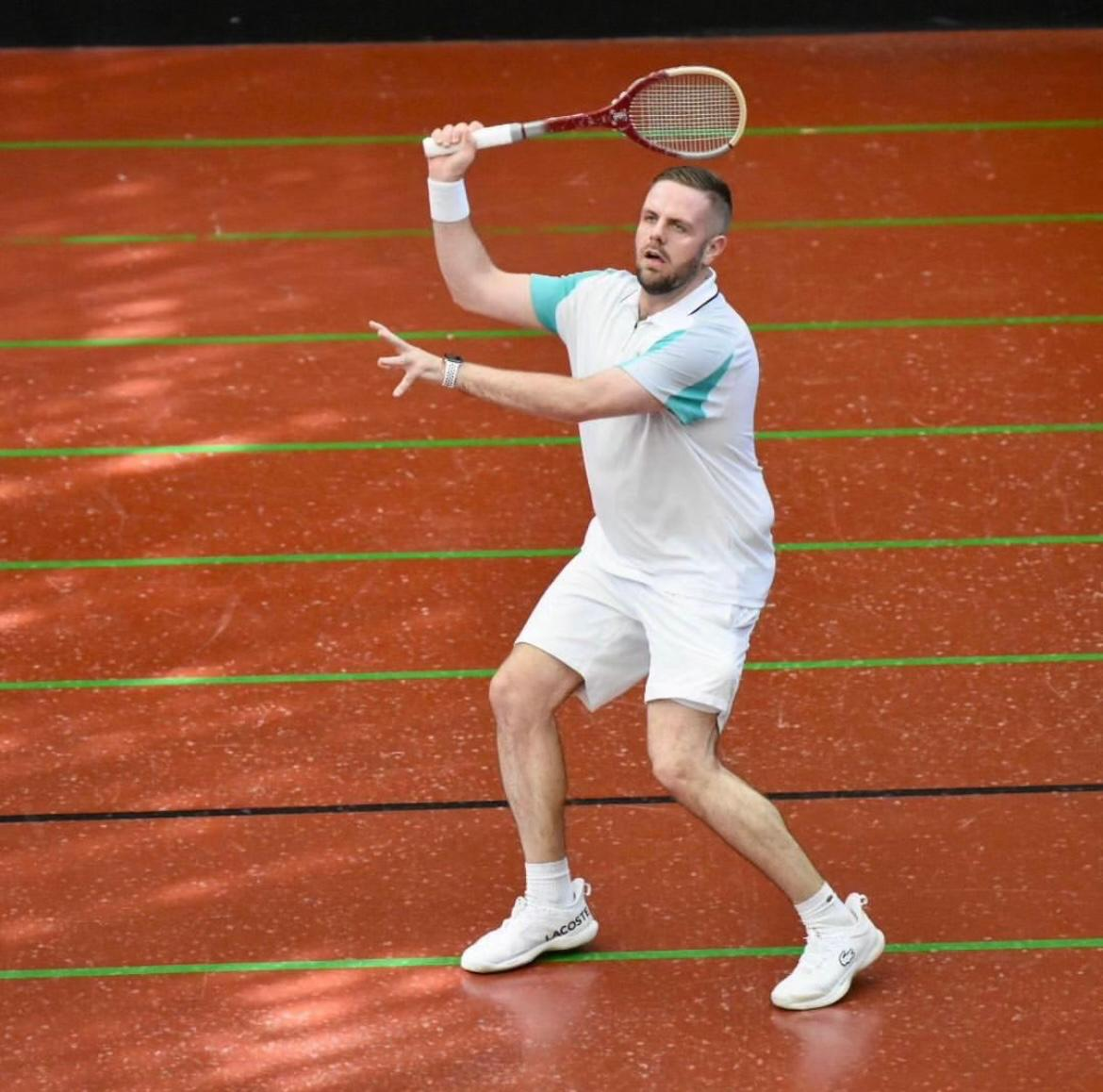
- Full name: Lewis Williams
- Country (sports): United Kingdom
- Residence: United Kingdom
- Born: 8 September 1994 (age 31)
- Turned pro: 2011
- Plays: Right-handed
- Club: Leamington Tennis Court Club

Singles
- Career titles: 0
- Highest ranking: 10
- Current ranking: 10

Grand Slam singles results
- Australian Open: SF (2023, 2026)
- British Open: 2R (2022, 2023)
- French Open: QF (2023, 2024)
- US Open: 1R (2023, 2024, 2025)

Doubles
- Career titles: 0
- Highest ranking: 11
- Current ranking: 11

Grand Slam doubles results
- Australian Open: SF (2025, 2026)
- French Open: SF (2025)
- British Open: QF (2013, 2014, 2023)
- US Open: QF (2023, 2024, 2025)

Lewis Williams (born 8 September 1994) is a British professional real tennis player, currently the head professional at the Leamington Tennis Court Club. He is currently ranked tenth in the world at singles and eleventh in the world at doubles. His most notable result was reaching the semi-finals at the 2023 and 2026 Australian Opens, as well as three career doubles semi-finals.

== Career ==
Williams began his career as a junior at the Prested Hall Real Tennis Club in Feering, Essex. He was successful in age group tournaments, winning the British Under 14's Open in 2008, followed by consecutive French Under 16's Opens in 2009 and 2010, defeating Baudouin Huynh-Lenhardt on both occasions. In 2010, Williams would win the British Under 16's Open, defeating Levi Gale in the final. He followed up in 2011 by winning the British Under 18's Open, while also reaching the final of the Prested Under 20's Cup. losing to Conor Medlow.

Williams turned professional in 2011, working at Prested Hall. He made his professional tournament debut at the 2011 IRTPA Championships at Manchester, losing to John Lumley both in the Satellite draw and the Taylor Cup for new professionals. In 2012, Williams made his American debut at the US Professional Singles, losing to Richard Smith in the main draw and Josh Bainton in the Satellite draw, all without winning a set. Following a loss in the 2012 British Under 18's Final to Levi Gale, Williams made his French Open debut in Bordeaux, losing in the first round to Ben Taylor-Matthews. He won his first Open doubles match at that tournament, paired with Adrian Kemp and defeating the French pair of Peio Sarlangue and Antoine Dubrulle in straight sets. At the end of the year, Williams entered the British Open for the first time. Williams progressed through three rounds of qualifying, beating Andrew Knibbs, Scott Blaber and Darren Long on the way, the former two in three set matches. Once in the main draw, he lost his first match to Mark Hobbs, ending the year without an Open match victory.

At the start of 2013, Williams reached the final of the British Under 24's Doubles at Middlesex with Michael Williams (no relation), beat by Medlow and Lumley. Williams travelled to Melbourne for the Australian Open, losing the first round of singles to Michael Williams. He did reach a second doubles quarter final with Brett McFarlane, overcoming the Australian amateur pair of Peter Estcourt and Walter Cockram in the first round. At the end of the year, he won the Category B Open at Bridport against local professional Neil Mackenzie and qualified for the British Open again. However he still could not register an Open match win, as he was defeated by Peter Wright in straight sets.

In 2014, Williams won the British Under 21's Open against Mackenzie, but still struggled to find a win in Open competitions. After qualifying for the French Open, he lost in the first round to Steve Virgona, and he failed to qualify for the British Open, losing to Will Burns. His season was redeemed by winning the Taylor Cup against Leon Smart in his last year of eligibility. Despite defending the British Under 21's Open in 2015 against Jonny Whitaker, Williams stepped back from real tennis in 2016. He only played the IRTPA Doubles Championship at his home court of Prested in 2016 and 2018, dropping out in the first round on both occasions. In 2019, he switched sports, becoming a padel coach at Prested Hall.

Williams returned to real tennis in 2021, becoming the head professional at the Leamington Tennis Court Club following the departure of Ben Taylor-Matthews. In his return to competitive play, he lost in the qualifiers of the British Open to Will Flynn. Williams played all four Opens in 2022, failing to qualify for the US Open. He registered his first Open singles victory at the Australian Open, beating CJ White in straight sets, losing to John Lumley in the quarter final. Williams also lost to Lumley at that year's French Open. In the British Open, Williams drew his first round against women's World Champion Claire Fahey. In a match going the full five sets, the first for either player, Williams came out the victor 3/6 6/5 6/3 3/6 6/3. Williams also made his Champions Trophy debut, failing to progress from qualifying. Again at the 2022 US Professional Singles, he reached the final of the satellite draw, losing to Leon Smart.

2023 would bring the best performances in Williams' career. He reached the semi final of the Australian Open, beating Australians Andrew Fowler and Michael Williams along the way. In the semi final, he lost to home professional Chris Chapman in straight sets. At the French Open, Williams would reach the quarter finals for the first time following another five set match against Josh Smith, with Williams saving match points in the third set. The pair would play another five set match in the first round of that year's British Open, with Williams again the victor.

In 2024, Williams did not progress past the first round of the Australian Open, losing to Darren Long in five sets. He registered his second match win at the French Open against Henry Henman, also defending match points. Outside of the national Opens, he was a finalist at the 2024 Category A Open at Manchester and the US Professional Singles satellite draw. He narrowly missed qualification to the Champions Trophy losing to Nino Merola in qualifying. He also lost in the first round of the British Open in five sets to Bertie Vallat, missing out on a third consecutive second round appearance.

At the start of 2025, Williams reached his first doubles semi final at the 2025 Australian Open, playing with John Woods-Casey. He also reached the singles quarter final of the same event, defeating Claire Fahey in the first round. His doubles form continued through the French Open, also reaching the semi-finals, this time with long-term partner Levi Gale. However, Gale would thwart him on the singles court, defeating him at the Category A Open, Champions Trophy, French Open and British Open across 2025.

He started 2026 by reaching the semi-finals of the Australian Open for the second time, again after defeating Michael Williams. At the end of January, he was appointed to become the Senior Professional at the International Tennis Hall of Fame in Newport, Rhode Island.

== Performance timeline ==
=== Singles ===
Key
W	F	SF	QF	#R	RR	Q#	DNQ	A	NH

(W) winner; (F) finalist; (SF) semifinalist; (QF) quarterfinalist; (#R) rounds 4, 3, 2, 1; (RR) round-robin stage; (Q#) qualification round; (DNQ) did not qualify; (A) absent; (NH) not held; (SR) strike rate (events won / competed); (W–L) win–loss record.
To avoid confusion and double counting, these charts are updated at the conclusion of a tournament or when the player's participation has ended.

Current through the 2025 US Open

Tournament	2011	2012	2013	2014	2015	2016	2017	2018	2019	2020	2021	2022	2023	2024	2025	2026	SR	W–L	Win %
Grand Slam tournaments
Australian Open	A	A	1R	A	A	A	A	A	A	A	NH	QF	SF	1R	QF	SF	0 / 6	6–6	50%
British Open	A	1R	1R	Q2	A	A	A	A	A	NH	Q1	2R	2R	1R	2R		0 / 6	2–6	25%
French Open	A	1R	A	1R	A	A	A	A	A	NH		1R	QF	QF	QF		0 / 6	3–6	33%
US Open	A	A	A	A	A	A	A	A	A	A	A	Q2	1R	1R	1R		0 / 3	0–3	0%
Win–loss	0–0	0–2	0–2	0–1	0–0	0–0	0–0	0–0	0–0	0–0	0–0	2–3	4–4	1–4	2–4	2–1	0 / 21	11–21	34%
IRTPA Sanctioned Tournaments
Champions Trophy	NH						A	A	A	NH		1R	RR	RR	RR		0 / 2	2–4	33%
IRTPA Championship	Q1	1R	A	1R	A	NH	A	A	A	NH					1R		0 / 3	0–3	0%
US Pro	A	1R	Q1	Q1	A	A	A	A	A	NH	A	1R	1R	1R	QF		0 / 5	1–5	17%
Win–loss	0–0	0–2	0–0	0–1	0–0	0–0	0–0	0–0	0–0	0–0	0–0	1–3	0–1	0–1	2–4	0–0	0 / 10	3–12	20%
Career Statistics
	2011	2012	2013	2014	2015	2016	2017	2018	2019	2020	2021	2022	2023	2024	2025	2026	Career		
Tournaments	0	4	2	2	0	0	0	0	0	0	0	5	5	5	7	1	Career total: 31		
Titles	0	0	0	0	0	0	0	0	0	0	0	0	0	0	0	0	Career total: 0		
Finals	0	0	0	0	0	0	0	0	0	0	0	0	0	0	0	0	Career total: 0		
Overall win–loss	0–0	0–4	0–2	0–2	0–0	0–0	0–0	0–0	0–0	0–0	0–0	3–6	4–5	1–5	4–8	2–1	14–33		30%
Win %	–	0%	0%	0%	–	–	–	–	–	–	–	33%	44%	17%	33%	67%	Career total: 30%		

=== Doubles ===
Tournament	2012	2013	2014	2015	2016	2017	2018	2019	2020	2021	2022	2023	2024	2025	2026	SR	W–L	Win %
Grand Slam tournaments
Australian Open	A	QF	A	A	A	A	A	A	A	NH	QF	QF	QF	SF	SF	0 / 6	3–6	33%
British Open	A	QF	QF	A	A	A	A	A	NH	A	1R	QF	QF	QF		0 / 6	5–6	45%
French Open	QF	NH	QF	A	A	A	A	A	NH		A	QF	QF	SF		0 / 5	2–5	29%
US Open	A	A	A	A	A	A	A	A	A	A	1R	QF	QF	QF		0 / 4	3–4	43%
Win–loss	1–1	2–2	1–2	0–0	0–0	0–0	0–0	0–0	0–0	0–0	0–3	2–4	2–4	4–4	1–1	0 / 21	13–21	38%
IRTPA Sanctioned Tournaments
IRTPA Championship	NH				QF	A	QF	NH								0 / 2	0–2	0%
Win–loss	0–0	0–0	0–0	0–0	0–1	0–0	0–1	0–0	0–0	0–0	0–0	0–0	0–0	0–0	0–0	0 / 2	0–2	0%
Career Statistics
	2012	2013	2014	2015	2016	2017	2018	2019	2020	2021	2022	2023	2024	2025	2026	Career		
Tournaments	1	2	2	0	1	0	1	0	0	0	3	4	4	4	1	Career total: 23		
Titles	0	0	0	0	0	0	0	0	0	0	0	0	0	0	0	Career total: 0		
Finals	0	0	0	0	0	0	0	0	0	0	0	0	0	0	0	Career total: 0		
Overall win–loss	1–1	2–2	1–2	0–0	0–1	0–0	0–1	0–0	0–0	0–0	0–3	2–4	2–4	4–4	1–1	13–23		36%
Win %	50%	50%	33%	–	0%	–	0%	–	–	–	0%	33%	33%	50%	50%	Career total: 36%		
