= Nederlandse Real Tennis Bond =

The Dutch Real Tennis Association (Nederlandse Real Tennis Bond) was founded in 1986 to return the sport of real tennis to the Netherlands. The association's goals include building a real tennis court and functioning as the national governing body. Since 1987 the association has organized a Dutch Real Tennis Championship tournament at various clubs in the United Kingdom.

The Real Tennis Club Huis ter Kleef (formerly "Real Tennis Club Wassenaar"), founded on November 20, 2001, is a private club of enthusiasts who are currently attempting to restore and operate the Kaatsbaan (real tennis court) at the castle Huis ter Kleef. The court was built around 1560 by Hendrik van Brederode, and tennis was played there likely until the early 17th century. In February 2006, the City of Haarlem agreed to the proposal to restore court at Huis ter Kleef, if the club can raise the necessary funds (approximately €1,000,000). The club has formally registered around 75 members.
