= 2024 US Open (court tennis) =

- Date: 20-29 February (men); 17-19 May (women)
- Edition: 74th (men); 39th (women)
- Category: IRTPA (men); None (women)
- Draw: 16S / 12D (men); 13S / 8D (women)
- Location: Philadelphia, Pennsylvania (men); Tuxedo Park, New York (women)
- Venue: Racquet Club of Philadelphia (men); Tuxedo Club (women)

Champions

Men's singles
- (United States) Camden Riviere

Women's singles
- (United Kingdom) Claire Fahey

Men's doubles
- (United States) Tim Chisholm / (United States) Camden Riviere

Women's doubles
- (United Kingdom) Claire Fahey / (United Kingdom) Alex Brodie
- US Open (court tennis)

The 2024 Court tennis US Open was the 74th edition of the US Open. The men's event was held at the Racquet Club of Philadelphia February 20-29, 2024, and was organized by the United States Court Tennis Association, forming part of the qualifying series for the 2025 Real Tennis World Championship. The women's event was held at the Tuxedo Club in Tuxedo Park, New York May 17-19, 2024. The men's draw was the second grand slam event of the year.

The men's singles draw was won by incumbent World Champion Camden Riviere for the 12th consecutive time. Riviere also won the men's doubles draw alongside Tim Chisholm, their 12th US Open title as a pairing. The women's singles draw was won by incumbent World Champion Claire Fahey, her ninth US Open singles victory and her fourth consecutive victory (excepting the two editions not held due to the COVID-19 pandemic. She also won the doubles draw with Alex Brodie, their first victory as a pairing since 2014.

== Draw and results ==
Amateur players are marked as (A)

=== Men's Singles Qualifying ===
==== First Qualifier ====
First Round			Second Round				Third Round
			3	(United Kingdom) N Mackenzie	6	6
(United States) H Smith (A)	4	4		(United States) J Crowell (A)	0	3
(United States) J Crowell (A)	6	6					3	(United Kingdom) N Mackenzie	6	5	6
							5	(United Kingdom) L Gordon	2	6	2
			5	(United Kingdom) L Gordon	w/o
				(United States) R Whitehouse

==== Second Qualifier ====
First Round				Second Round					Third Round
				4	(Australia) J Woods-Casey	1	6	6
	(United States) E Segal (A)	4	2	6	(United States) N Motz (A)	6	2	5
6	(United States) N Motz (A)	6	6						4	(Australia) J Woods-Casey	6	2	2
	(United States) P Dickinson	6	6						2	(United States) F Bristowe (A)	5	6	6
	(United States) J Greenley	2	3		(United States) P Dickinson	0	3
				2	(United States) F Bristowe (A)	6	6

=== Men's Singles ===
First round
1	(United States) C Riviere	6	6	6
(United States) B Tanfield	0	2	1
Q	(United States) F Bristowe (A)	5	2	2
7	(United Kingdom) B Sayers	6	6	6
6	(Australia) S Virgona	6	6	6
(United Kingdom) L Williams	1	5	0
(United Kingdom) D Long	0	1	6	1
4	(Australia) N Howell	6	6	5	6
3	(Australia) R Fahey	6	6	6
(United Kingdom) R Shenkman (A)	5	3	2
(United States) T Chisholm	3	4	3
5	(United Kingdom) B Taylor-Matthews	6	6	6
8	(United Kingdom) L Smart	4	6	6	6
(France) M Sarlangue (A)	6	4	5	3
Q	(United Kingdom) N Mackenzie	0	4	2
2	(United Kingdom) J Lumley	6	6	6

Quarter-finals
1	(United States) C Riviere	6	3	6	6
7	(United Kingdom) B Sayers	5	6	3	0
6	(Australia) S Virgona	6	2	6	6
4	(Australia) N Howell	3	6	3	1
3	(Australia) R Fahey	6	0	6	6
5	(United Kingdom) B Taylor-Matthews	2	6	1	2
8	(United Kingdom) L Smart	3	0	2
2	(United Kingdom) J Lumley	6	6	6

Semi-finals
1	(United States) C Riviere	6	6	6
6	(Australia) S Virgona	3	0	2
3	(Australia) R Fahey	1	2	5
2	(United Kingdom) J Lumley	6	6	6

Final
1	(United States) C Riviere	6	4	3	6	6
2	(United Kingdom) J Lumley	0	6	6	2	2

=== Men's Doubles ===
First round
(United States) P Dickinson (United States) H Smith (A)	0	0	3
(United Kingdom) L Williams (United Kingdom) L Gordon	6	6	6
(United States) J Crowell (A) (Australia) J Woods-Casey	1	4	2
6	(United Kingdom) R Shenkman (A) (United Kingdom) D Long	6	6	6
(United States) E Segal (A) (United States) J Greenley	1	1	1
5	(United Kingdom) L Smart (United States) J Dodgson	6	6	6
(United States) B Tanfield (United States) F Bristowe (A)	6	6	6
(United States) N Motz (A) (United Kingdom) N Mackenzie	3	5	3

Quarter-finals
1	(United States) T Chisholm (United States) C Riviere	6	6	6
(United Kingdom) L Williams (United Kingdom) L Gordon	2	2	5
4	(United Kingdom) B Sayers (United Kingdom) B Taylor-Matthews	5	6	5	6	2
6	(United Kingdom) R Shenkman (A) (United Kingdom) D Long	6	3	6	2	6
3	(United Kingdom) J Lumley (Australia) S Virgona	6	6	6
5	(United Kingdom) L Smart (United States) J Dodgson	1	2	0
2	(Australia) R Fahey (Australia) N Howell	4	6	4	6	4
(United States) B Tanfield (United States) F Bristowe (A)	6	2	6	1	6

Semi-finals
1	(United States) T Chisholm (United States) C Riviere	6	6	6
6	(United Kingdom) R Shenkman (A) (United Kingdom) D Long	2	2	4
3	(United Kingdom) J Lumley (Australia) S Virgona	6	6	6
(United States) B Tanfield (United States) F Bristowe (A)	5	1	0

Final
1	(United States) T Chisholm (United States) C Riviere	6	5	6	5	6
3	(United Kingdom) J Lumley (Australia) S Virgona	1	6	2	6	4

=== Women's Singles ===
Note: all players are amateurs except Claire Fahey

First round
(United States) C Alchuteguy	6	4	6
(United States) M Hayes	1	6	1
(United States) E McMorris	0	0
4	(Australia) X Ranger	6	6
3	(United States) E Young	w/o
(United States) C Yannuzzi
(United States) S Schwartz Peffer	1	1
(United Kingdom) A Brodie	6	6
(France) L Grosset	6	6
(United States) C Voegele	1	0
(United States) H Christensen
2	(Australia) JS Tan	w/o

Second round
1	(United Kingdom) C Fahey
bye
(United States) C Alchuteguy	1	0
4	(Australia) X Ranger	6	6
3	(United States) E Young	6	6
(United Kingdom) A Brodie	0	2
(France) L Grosset	0	0
2	(Australia) JS Tan	6	6

Semifinals
1	(United Kingdom) C Fahey	6	6
4	(Australia) X Ranger	0	0
3	(United States) E Young	2	1
2	(Australia) JS Tan	6	6

Finals
1	(United Kingdom) C Fahey	6	6
2	(Australia) JS Tan	0	0

=== Women's Doubles ===
Note: all players are amateurs except Claire Fahey

First round
(United States) M Panico (United States) S Mueller	0	6	3
(United States) E McMorris (United States) B Wakim	6	2	6

Second round
1	(United Kingdom) C Fahey (United Kingdom) A Brodie
bye
(United States) C Yannuzzi (United States) H Christensen	6	6
(United States) E McMorris (United States) B Wakim	0	2
(France) L Grosset (United States) C Alchuteguy	6	5	6
(United States) C Vogele (United States) M Hayes	4	6	1
(United States) A Gold (France) S Schwartz Peffer	0	0
2	(Australia) X Ranger (Australia) JS Tan	6	6

Semifinals
1	(United Kingdom) C Fahey (United Kingdom) A Brodie	6	6
(United States) C Yannuzzi (United States) H Christensen	1	0
(France) L Grosset (United States) C Alchuteguy	1	0
2	(Australia) X Ranger (Australia) JS Tan	6	6

Finals
1	(United Kingdom) C Fahey (United Kingdom) A Brodie	6	6
2	(Australia) X Ranger (Australia) JS Tan	0	0

== See also ==
- Grand Slam (real tennis)
