= Matthieu Sarlangue =

French real tennis player

- Full name: Matthieu Sarlangue
- Country (sports): France
- Residence: France
- Born: 14 August 1992 (age 32)
- Plays: Right-handed
- Club: Société Sportive du Jeu de Paume et de Racquets, Paris

World Championships
- Open Singles: Not qualified
- Open Doubles: SF (2019)

Singles
- Career titles: 0
- Highest ranking: 8
- Current ranking: 11

Grand Slam singles results
- Australian Open: SF (2020)
- British Open: QF (2019, 2021, 2023)
- French Open: QF (2014, 2015, 2017, 2018, 2019, 2022 2023, 2024)
- US Open: SF (2020, 2023)

Doubles
- Career titles: 0
- Highest ranking: 9
- Current ranking: 16

Grand Slam doubles results
- Australian Open: QF (2017)
- French Open: F (2023)
- British Open: QF (2018, 2022)
- US Open: SF (2021, 2022, 2023)

Matthieu Sarlangue (born 14 August 1992) is an amateur French real tennis (jeu de paume) player currently based at the Société Sportive du Jeu de Paume et de Racquets in Paris. He has won the Raquette d'Or – the French Amateur Championships – on 14 occasions and the British Amateur singles on two occasions. In Open play, he is a former World Championship Doubles semi finalist and was formerly ranked as high as eighth in the world at singles, notably reaching the semi finals of the 2020 Australian Open. He is currently the number one ranked French player, professional or amateur, and ranked number 11 in the world.

== Career ==
Sarlangue began playing real tennis as a junior at the Société Sportive du Jeu de Paume et de Racquets in Paris. A promising young player, he was twice a finalist at the British Junior Open Under 16 championships in 2007 and 2008, losing both times to future World Championship Challenger John Lumley. He made his debut at the Raquette d'Or – the French Amateur Championship – in 2008 aged 15. Also in 2008 he made his Bathurst Cup – the premier international real tennis competition between nations – debut for France, winning both of his matches in the third place playoff against the United States. Sarlangue won the French Junior Championships against future Women's World Champion Claire Fahey in 2009, defending it in 2010, whilst defeating Lumley in the British Junior Under 18 Championship. In 2010, at his second attempt Sarlangue won the Raquette d'Or, a title he would defend a total of fourteen times.

Sarlangue was a finalist at the British Under 21's and Under 24's Opens, losing both to Lumley in three sets. He entered the British Amateur for the first time in 2012, struggling through the first round against William Fortune, but cruising comfortably in the semi final against Robert Hird. However, he received a walkover in the semi final after his opponent, Peter Wright had his racquets vandalised (Sarlangue was not considered a suspect). In the final he pushed 19-time champion Julian Snow to five sets losing 6/5 in the fifth. Sarlangue entered the British Open qualifying for the first time later that year, winning through to the main draw but losing in the first round to Chris Chapman. In 2013, he made his French Open debut, losing in the first round to Ricardo Smith. He also entered the World Championship Doubles that year with Paris club professional Rod McNaughtan as the competition was held in lieu of the French Open doubles, but lost in the first round to the former British amateur champions Jamie Douglas and Peter Wright.

In 2014, Sarlangue won the British Amateur championships for the first time, defeating Wright in the semi final in 5 sets and Douglas in the final. However, he and doubles partner Alistair Lumsden lost the doubles final to Wright and Douglas in 5 sets, the final set ending 6/5. Sarlangue reached his first Open quarter final at the French Open, defeating rackets World Champion James Stout in the first round. He did not defend his British Amateur title in 2015, opting instead to challenge and win the US Amateur Championships against Brook Hazelton. He again played for France in the Bathurst Cup in Hobart, helping defeat the United States to take third place. At the French Open, Sarlangue made consecutive doubles semi finals in 2015 and 2016 with doubles partner Rod McNaughtan, his best result at an Open to date. He won through to the second round of the 2016 British Open in five sets against Darren long.

In 2017, Sarlangue played his most recent British Amateur to date, beating Cambridge's Ed Kay in the final in five sets, but losing in the doubles again to Wright and Douglas. He won through to his first doubles quarter final of the British Open, losing to Doubles World Champions Tim Chisholm and Camden Riviere. From 2017 onwards, Sarlangue began a period of entering all Open tournaments in an effort to improve his world ranking and begin to challenge for the World Race. At the start of 2018 he made his Australian Open debut, reaching a quarter final against Robert Fahey, and his US Open debut, though he did not win a match. Later in the year, he qualified through to the main draw of the Champions Trophy at the Royal Tennis Court, pushing him into the top 10 of the world rankings.

At the start of 2019, Sarlangue entered the Doubles World Champions in Hobart with Ben Taylor-Matthews. After winning their first round against Graham Hyland and Tony Blom 3 sets to 1, they lost to eventual champions Chisholm and Riviere 3 sets to 1. Sarlangue played at the subsequent Australian Open without winning a match, also getting knocked out of the first round of the US Open. Partnered with Chris Chapman, Sarlangue made semi finals of three of four Opens that year. He won his best singles result to date in an Open competition at the 2019 Champions Trophy, progressing through qualifying and beating Darren Long in the quarter final to reach a semi final against world champion Robert Fahey, losing in four sets. At that year's Bathurst Cup in Racquet Club of Chicago, Sarlangue helped his team reach the final against Great Britain, winning all but one of his matches.

In 2020, Sarlangue reached his first Open singles semi final at the Australian Open, beating CJ White in the first round, but losing to Australian Amateur champion Kieran Booth, bringing him to his career best singles ranking of 8. International play was paused for the COVID-19 pandemic between 2020 and 2021. When play resumed, Sarlangue continued his run of quarter final appearances at the French Open in 2022, and took France to second place to Great Britain at the Bathurst Cup at Lord's. Sarlangue has not played doubles at tournaments outside the French Open since the pandemic.

In 2023, Sarlangue reached the quarterfinals of the US, French and British Opens, but has been unable to progress further in these competitions. His world ranking dropped from 8 to 11 following the rise of Robert Shenkman and Leon Smart.

== Performance timeline ==
=== Singles ===
Key
W	F	SF	QF	#R	RR	Q#	DNQ	A	NH

(W) winner; (F) finalist; (SF) semifinalist; (QF) quarterfinalist; (#R) rounds 4, 3, 2, 1; (RR) round-robin stage; (Q#) qualification round; (DNQ) did not qualify; (A) absent; (NH) not held; (SR) strike rate (events won / competed); (W–L) win–loss record.
To avoid confusion and double counting, these charts are updated at the conclusion of a tournament or when the player's participation has ended.

Current through the 2024 French Open

Tournament	2012	2013	2014	2015	2016	2017	2018	2019	2020	2021	2022	2023	2024	SR	W–L	Win %
Grand Slam tournaments
Australian Open	A	A	A	A	A	A	QF	1R	SF	NH	A	A	A	0 / 3	2–3	40%
British Open	1R	2R	A	A	2R	1R	2R	QF	NH	QF	1R	QF	2R	0 / 10	6–10	38%
French Open	A	1R	QF	QF	1R	QF	QF	QF	NH		QF	QF	QF	0 / 10	6–10	38%
US Open	A	A	A	A	A	A	2R	2R	QF	A	2R	QF	2R	0 / 6	2–5	29%
Win–loss	0–1	1–2	1–1	0–1	1–2	1–2	4–4	1–4	1–2	1–1	1–3	3–2	1–2	0 / 29	16–28	36%
IRTPA Sanctioned Tournaments
Champions Trophy	NH					A	1R	SF	NH		A	1R	A	0 / 3	3–3	50%
IRTPA Championship	A	A	A	A	NH	A	QF	QF	NH					0 / 2	2–2	50%
US Pro	A	A	A	A	A	A	A	QF	NH	A	A	1R	A	0 / 2	1–2	33%
Win–loss	0–0	0–0	0–0	0–0	0–0	0–0	1–2	3–3	0–0	0–0	0–0	2–2	0–0	0 / 7	6–7	46%
Career Statistics
	2012	2013	2014	2015	2016	2017	2018	2019	2020	2021	2022	2023	2024	Career		
Tournaments	1	2	1	1	2	2	6	7	2	1	3	5	3	Career total: 36		
Titles	0	0	0	0	0	0	0	0	0	0	0	0	0	Career total: 0		
Finals	0	0	0	0	0	0	0	0	0	0	0	0	0	Career total: 0		
Overall win–loss	0–1	1–2	1–1	0–1	1–2	1–2	5–6	4–7	1–2	1–1	1–3	5–4	1–3	23–35		40%
Win %	0%	33%	50%	0%	33%	33%	45%	36%	33%	50%	25%	56%	25%	Career total: 40%		

=== Doubles ===
Tournament	2012	2013	2014	2015	2016	2017	2018	2019	2020	2021	2022	2023	SR	W–L	Win %
World Championship
World Championship	NH	QF	NH	DNQ	NH	DNQ	NH	SF	NH		DNQ	NH	0 / 2	1–2	33%
Win–loss	0–0	0–1	0–0	0–0	0–0	0–0	0–0	1–1	0–0	0–0	0–0	0–0	0 / 2	1–2	33%
Grand Slam tournaments
Australian Open	A	A	A	A	A	A	QF	QF	A	NH	A	A	0 / 2	0–2	0%
British Open	1R	1R	QF	A	A	QF	QF	SF	NH	SF	A	A	0 / 7	3–7	30%
French Open	A	NH	QF	SF	SF	QF	SF	SF	NH		QF	QF	0 / 8	3–8	27%
US Open	A	A	A	A	A	A	QF	SF	A	A	A	A	0 / 2	2–2	50%
Win–loss	0–1	0–1	0–2	0–1	1–1	1–2	3–4	3–4	0–0	0–1	0–1	0–1	0 / 19	8–19	30%
IRTPA Sanctioned Tournaments
Win–loss	0–0	0–0	0–0	0–0	0–0	0–0	0–0	0–0	0–0	0–0	0–0	0–0	0 / 0	0–0	–
Career Statistics
	2012	2013	2014	2015	2016	2017	2018	2019	2020	2021	2022	2023	Career		
Tournaments	1	2	2	1	1	2	4	5	0	1	1	1	Career total: 21		
Titles	0	0	0	0	0	0	0	0	0	0	0	0	Career total: 0		
Finals	0	0	0	0	0	0	0	0	0	0	0	0	Career total: 0		
Overall win–loss	0–1	0–2	0–2	0–1	1–1	1–2	3–4	4–5	0–0	0–1	0–1	0–1	9–21		30%
Win %	0%	0%	0%	0%	50%	33%	43%	44%	–	0%	0%	0%	Career total: 30%		
