= 2022 US Open (court tennis) =

- Date: 25 May-1 June (men); 13–15 May (women)
- Edition: 72nd (men); 38th (women)
- Category: IRTPA (men); None (women)
- Draw: 16S / 12D (men); 15S / 8D (women)
- Location: Tuxedo Park, New York (men); Boston, Massachusetts (women)
- Venue: Tuxedo Club (men); Tennis and Racquet Club (women)

Champions

Men's singles
- (United States) Camden Riviere

Women's singles
- (United Kingdom) Claire Fahey

Men's doubles
- (United States) Tim Chisholm / (United States) Camden Riviere

Women's doubles
- (United Kingdom) Claire Fahey / (United States) Frederika Adam
← 2021 ·	US Open (court tennis)	· 2023 →

The 2022 Court Tennis US Open was the 72nd edition of the US Open. The men's event was held at the Tuxedo Club in Tuxedo Park, New York between May 25-June 1, 2022 and was organised by the United States Court Tennis Association, forming part of the qualifying series for the 2023 Real Tennis World Championship. The women's event was held at the Tennis and Racquet Club in Boston, Massachusetts between May 13–15, 2024. The men's draw was the second grand slam event of the year.

The men's singles draw was won by incumbent World Champion Camden Riviere for the 10th consecutive time. Riviere also won the men's doubles draw alongside Tim Chisholm, their 11th US Open title as a pairing. The women's singles draw was won by incumbent World Champion Claire Fahey, her 7th US Open singles victory and her second consecutive victory (excepting the two editions not held due to the COVID-19 pandemic. She also won the doubles draw with Frederika Adam, their first victory in the tournament as a pairing.

The edition would be Chris Chapman's final appearance at the US Open before his retirement from international competition in 2023.

== Draw and results ==
Amateur players are marked as (A)

=== Men's Singles Qualifying ===
==== First Qualifier ====
First Round
(United States) F Bristowe (A)	w/o
(United Kingdom) A Kemp
(United Kingdom) T Hollins	6	6
(United States) J Greenley	2	4
(United States) H Smith (A)	0	0
(United Kingdom) J Dodgson	6	6

Second Round
1	(United Kingdom) R Shenkman (A)	6	5	6
(United States) F Bristowe (A)	4	6	2
(United Kingdom) T Hollins	2	3
(United Kingdom) J Dodgson	6	6

Third Round
(United Kingdom) R Shenkman (A)	6	6
(United Kingdom) J Dodgson	2	3

==== Second Qualifier ====
First Round
(United States) B Tanfield	6	6
(United States) J Motz (A)	3	4
(United States) P Dickinson	1	1
(United Kingdom) L Williams	6	6
(United States) R Whitehouse	5	2
(United States) N Motz (A)	6	6

Second Round
(United States) B Tanfield	2	6	6
(United Kingdom) L Williams	6	1	4
(United States) N Motz (A)	1	1
2	(United Kingdom) L Smart	6	6

Third Round
(United States) B Tanfield	6	1	5
(United Kingdom) L Smart	4	6	6

=== Men's Singles ===
First round
1	(United States) C Riviere	6	6	6
(United Kingdom) J Smith	2	2	2
(United States) B Tanfield	2	0	3
7	(United Kingdom) B Sayers	6	6	6
5	(Australia) C Chapman	6	6	6
(United Kingdom) D Long	2	2	2
Q	(United Kingdom) L Smart	6	6	5	6
4	(Australia) B Taylor-Matthews	5	4	6	1
3	(United Kingdom) J Lumley	6	6	6
Q	(United Kingdom) R Shenkman (A)	4	0	1
(Australia) S Virgona	6	3	6	6
6	(Australia) N Howell	5	6	4	2
(France) M Sarlangue (A)	2	4	2
(United States) T Chisholm	6	6	6
(United Kingdom) N Mackenzie	2	1	1
2	(Australia) R Fahey	6	6	6

Quarter-finals
1	(United States) C Riviere	6	6	6
7	(United Kingdom) B Sayers	2	3	3
5	(Australia) C Chapman	4	6	4	3
Q	(United Kingdom) L Smart	6	1	6	6
3	(United Kingdom) J Lumley	6	6	6
(Australia) S Virgona	2	2	1
(United States) T Chisholm	3	3	6	2
2	(Australia) R Fahey	6	6	3	6

Semi-finals
1	(United States) C Riviere	6	6	6
Q	(United Kingdom) L Smart	4	2	2
3	(United Kingdom) J Lumley	4	4	5
2	(Australia) R Fahey	6	6	6

Final
1	(United States) C Riviere	6	6	6
2	(Australia) R Fahey	2	3	5

=== Men's Doubles ===
First round
(United Kingdom) A Kemp (United Kingdom) L Williams	4	5	2
(United Kingdom) D Long (United Kingdom) R Shenkman (A)	6	6	6
(United Kingdom) J Dodgson (United Kingdom) L Smart	6	6	6
(United Kingdom) M Ronaldson (United States) H Smith (A)	1	2	2
(United Kingdom) N Mackenzie (United Kingdom) J Smith	6	2	4	3
(United Kingdom) T Hollins (United Kingdom) F Bristowe (A)	4	6	6	6
5	(Australia) C Chapman (Australia) S Virgona	6	6	6
(United States) J Motz (A) (United States) N Motz (A)	0	0	0

Second round
1	(United States) T Chisholm (United States) C Riviere	6	6	6
(United Kingdom) D Long (United Kingdom) R Shenkman (A)	0	0	4
(United Kingdom) J Dodgson (United Kingdom) L Smart	6	6	4	6
4	(United Kingdom) J Lumley (United States) R Whitehouse	5	4	6	0
3	(Australia) R Fahey (Australia) N Howell	6	6	6
(United Kingdom) T Hollings (United Kingdom) F Bristowe (A)	1	0	1
5	(Australia) C Chapman (Australia) S Virgona	6	6	6
2	(United Kingdom) B Sayers (United Kingdom) B Taylor-Matthews	2	5	2

Semifinals
1	(United States) T Chisholm (United States) C Riviere	6	1
(United Kingdom) J Dodgson (United Kingdom) L Smart	1	0
3	(Australia) R Fahey (Australia) N Howell	2	6	6	6
5	(Australia) C Chapman (Australia) S Virgona	6	5	4	2

Finals
1	(United States) T Chisholm (United States) C Riviere	6	6	6
3	(Australia) R Fahey (Australia) N Howell	1	4	2

=== Women's Singles ===
Note: all players are amateurs except Claire Fahey

First Round
(United States) E Wylie	0	0
(United States) C Voegele	6	6
(United States) C Yannuzzi	6	6
(India) P Sakpal	3	4
(United States) J Faulise	6	6
(United States) K Minevitz	0	0

Second Round
1	(United Kingdom) C Fahey
bye
bye
bye
(United States) K Villiers	6	6
(United States) C Voegele	2	1
(United States) C Yannuzzi	2	0
4	(United States) H Grassi Vest	6	6
3	(Australia) X Ranger	6	6
(United States) J Faulise	0	0
(United States) S Schwartz-Peffer	1	3
(United States) V Scott	6	6
(United States) A Wintersteen
(United States) H Christensen	w/o
bye
2	(United States) F Adam

Quarter Finals
1	(United Kingdom) C Fahey
bye
(United States) C Voegele	4	4
4	(United States) H Grassi Vest	6	6
3	(Australia) X Ranger	6	6
(United States) V Scott	1	1
(United States) H Christensen	6	6
2	(United States) F Adam	3	0

Semi Finals
1	(United Kingdom) C Fahey	6	6
4	(United States) H Grassi Vest	0	0
3	(Australia) X Ranger	6	4	1
2	(United States) F Adam	4	6	6

Final
1	(United Kingdom) C Fahey	6	6
2	(United States) F Adam	0	1

=== Women's Doubles ===
Note: all players are amateurs except Claire Fahey

First round
(United States) J Faulise (India) P Sakpal	2	0
(United States) H Christensen (United States) C Yannuzzi	6	6
(United States) K Minevitz (United States) E Wylie	1	6	0
(United States) C Rice (United States) A Lehr	6	4	6

Second round
1	(United Kingdom) C Fahey (United States) F Adam
bye
(United States) C Voegele (United States) S Schwartz Peffer	6	2	4
(United States) K Villiers (United States) V Scott	4	6	6
3	(United States) H Grassi Vest (United States) A Wintersteen
(United States) H Christensen (United States) C Yannuzzi	w/o
(United States) C Rice (United States) A Lehr	0	0
2	(Australia) X Ranger (United States) M Hayes	6	6

Semifinals
1	(United Kingdom) C Fahey (United States) F Adam	6	6
(United States) K Villiers (United States) V Scott	0	0
(United States) H Christensen (United States) C Yannuzzi	2	3
2	(Australia) X Ranger (United States) M Hayes	6	6

Finals
1	(United Kingdom) C Fahey (United States) F Adam	6	6
2	(Australia) X Ranger (United States) M Hayes	0	0

== See also ==
- Grand Slam (real tennis)
