= Robert Shenkman =

British real tennis player

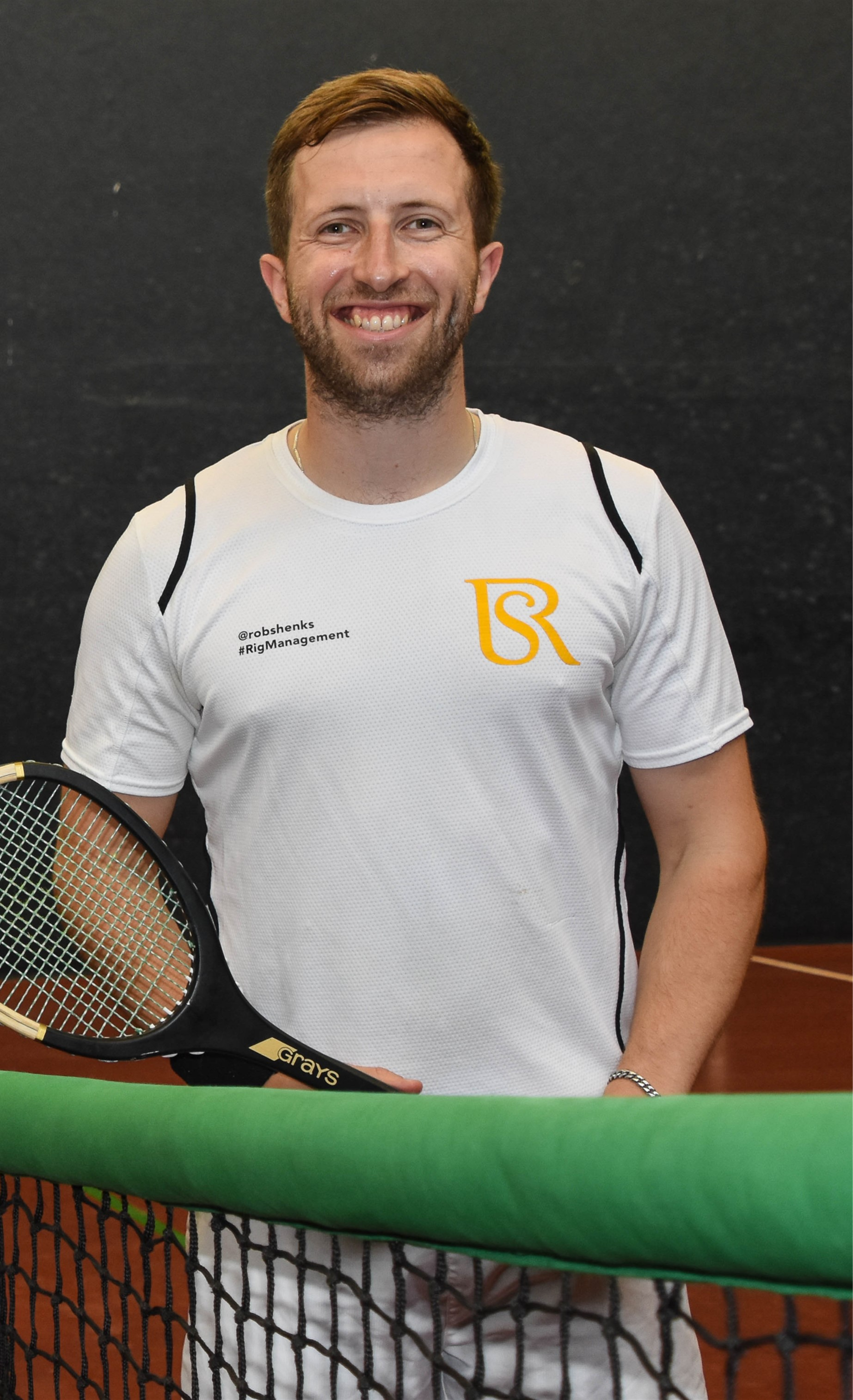
- Shenkman at the 2024 Champions Trophy
- Full name: Robert Joshua Shenkman
- Country (sports): United Kingdom
- Residence: United Kingdom
- Born: 20 September 1996 (age 29)
- Plays: Right-handed
- Club: Manchester Tennis and Racquet Club

Singles
- Career titles: 0
- Highest ranking: 7
- Current ranking: 7

Grand Slam singles results
- British Open: QF (2023, 2024)
- French Open: SF (2025)
- US Open: QF (2023, 2025)

Doubles
- Career titles: 0
- Highest ranking: 9
- Current ranking: 9

Grand Slam doubles results
- French Open: SF (2024, 2025)
- British Open: QF (2017, 2019, 2022, 2023, 2024)
- US Open: SF (2024)

Robert Shenkman (born 20 September 1996) is an amateur British real tennis player currently based at the Manchester Tennis and Racquet Club. He is the current British Amateur Champion and MCC Gold Racquet holder, and was the first amateur to unite the US Amateur, British Amateur and MCC Gold Racquet titles since Julian Snow in 2003. Shenkman is ranked in the top 10 Open singles rankings and has reached the semi final of the French Open Singles.

== Career ==
=== Real tennis ===
Shenkman began playing real tennis as a junior, competing in the British Junior Under 16's and Under 18's championships between 2011 and 2014 but not reaching the final on any occasion. As a junior, he competed in the senior category tournaments, winning the Category D in 2012 and the Category C in 2013. He also won the Prested Cup Under 20 championships in 2015 and 2016.

Shenkman entered his first Open aged 19 at the 2015 British Open. He narrowly progressed through qualifying against Zak Eadle, before losing in the first round of the main draw to Craig Greenhalgh. He reached the final of the 2016 British U21's Open, this time losing to Eadle. He toured the US in February 2016, reaching the semi final of the Tuxedo Gold Racquet, the final of the US Amateur at Aiken and won his first Open match in the first round of the US Open against Adrian Kemp in Chicago.

Shenkman attended the University of Birmingham from 2016, avoiding touring for major tennis tournaments but instead developing his game with Ben Taylor-Matthews at the Leamington Tennis Court Club alongside his studies. In 2017, he represented the British team at the under 26 Van Alen and Limb Cups in Boston. That year, he lost in the first round of the British Open to amateur Peter Wright.

In 2018, he mostly competed in amateur tournaments in Britain, challenging Ed Kay for the MCC Silver Racquet and again at the semi final of the British Amateur. He won the 2018 British Under 24's Open against Jamie Giddins.

In 2019, Shenkman retained his Under 24's Open title, this time defeating Zak Eadle in the final. Shenkman again played for the British Team at the Van Alen and Limb Cups at Manchester, winning both of his singles matches. He entered qualifying for the Champions Trophy for the first time, but failed to progress from the group stage. He again lost his first round match at the 2019 British Open to Jamie Douglas. In early 2020, he travelled to Australia as a hitting partner for Ben Taylor-Matthews in the 2020 World Championship Eliminator. There, he and Taylor-Matthews began their podcast "A View from the Hazards," which they continued through the subsequent hiatus from competitive play due to COVID-19. A third consecutive Under 24's Open title was also secured in 2020, being only the fourth player to win the trophy in three consecutive years.

When play returned after the pandemic, and having now completed his studies, Shenkman began touring more regularly and began having successes at the top of the Open and Amateur games. He won his first British Open match in 2021 against Will Burns, his first tournament back after the pandemic. In 2022, he won the US Amateur Championships for the first time, and progressed through qualifying to reach the main draw of the US Open. He represented Britain for the third time on the Van Alen and George Limb tour, this time to Australia where he also won the Australian Under 26 Amateur Championships in Hobart. He also debuted at the French Open, winning a set off former World Champion Robert Fahey in the first round.

In 2023, Shenkman began to climb the rankings through strong performances at the Open events. He defeated world number 4 Chris Chapman at the US Professional Singles in Newport in five sets, in what would be Chapman's last match before his retirement from international play. Shenkman would lose in the quarter final to Leon Smart 6/5 6/5 6/5, but he would win the associated Satellite tournament as a consolation prize. He also reached the quarter finals of the US Open and British Open for the first time, and qualified to the main draw of the Champions Trophy. On the amateur circuit, he defended his US Amateur title against Freddie Bristowe, and won his first British Amateur title against Jamie Douglas. He earned the right to challenge Douglas for the MCC Gold Racquet by defeating Ed Kay in the MCC Silver Racquet, but would ultimately be defeated by Douglas in five sets.

At the 2024 US Open, Shenkman and doubles partner Darren Long upset World Doubles challengers Ben Taylor-Matthews and Bryn Sayers to reach his first Open semi final. Shenkman and Long then lost to eventual winners Camden Riviere and Tim Chisholm. Shenkman defended his US Professional Satellite title in Newport and won through qualifying at that year's Champions Trophy reaching the second quarter final stage following a win over Leon Smart in the first quarter final. He had his best French Open to date, reaching his first quarter final in the singles and his first semi final in the doubles. On the amateur circuit in 2024, Shenkman successfully defended his British Amateur and US Amateur titles, and successfully challenged Douglas for the MCC Gold Racquet title, coming from 2 sets down in the process In achieving this, Shenkman became the first player to hold all three amateur titles simultaneously since Julian Snow in 2003. He also captained the British team at the Bathurst Cup in Melbourne, losing to Australia in the final. He then reached the final of the 2024 Australian Amateur championship, losing to Kieran Booth in a unique attempt to unify all of the worldwide Amateur Titles.

In the 2024-25 season, Shenkman had his best season to date reaching the Quarter Final of every Open that he participated in. He lost in 4 sets to Nick Howell at the 2024 British Open, in straight sets to John Lumley at the 2025 US Open and also made the Quarter Finals of the US Pro Singles and the 2025 Champions Trophy. Due to his consistent performances in the 2024-25 season Shenkman finished the season at number 8 in the IRTPA World Rankings. He then became the first British Amateur since Julian Snow in 1998 to reach an Open Semi final, achieving this at the French Open in September 2025.

=== Rackets ===
Shenkman occasionally competes in rackets tournaments, most notably at the Manchester Gold Racquet each year since 2014, excluding 2018. He has reached the semi final on two occasions, losing to Alexander Duncliffe-Vines in 2019 and then-future World Champion Ben Cawston in 2022. In 2016 he won the British Under 21 Singles and earlier in the year won the Tuxedo Gold Racquet. He then went on to play in the US Open in 2016 in New York, losing in the first round to Charlie Braham.

=== Personal life ===
As an amateur Real Tennis player, Shenkman is an Accountant by trade and combines his job in the financial sector with competing on the global real tennis circuit.

== Performance timeline ==
=== Singles ===
Key
W	F	SF	QF	#R	RR	Q#	DNQ	A	NH

(W) winner; (F) finalist; (SF) semifinalist; (QF) quarterfinalist; (#R) rounds 4, 3, 2, 1; (RR) round-robin stage; (Q#) qualification round; (DNQ) did not qualify; (A) absent; (NH) not held; (SR) strike rate (events won / competed); (W–L) win–loss record.
To avoid confusion and double counting, these charts are updated at the conclusion of a tournament or when the player's participation has ended.

Current through the 2025 US Open

Tournament	2015	2016	2017	2018	2019	2020	2021	2022	2023	2024	2025	SR	W–L	Win %
World Championship
Win–loss	0–0	0–0	0–0	0–0	0–0	0–0	0–0	0–0	0–0	0–0	0–0	0 / 0	0–0	–
Grand Slam tournaments
British Open	1R	A	1R	A	1R	NH	2R	2R	QF	QF		0 / 7	5–7	42%
French Open	A	A	A	A	A	NH		1R	1R	QF		0 / 3	1–3	25%
US Open	A	2R	A	A	A	A	A	1R	QF	1R	QF	0 / 5	3–5	38%
Win–loss	0–1	1–1	0–1	0–0	0–1	0–0	1–1	1–3	3–3	2–3	1–1	0 / 15	9–15	38%
IRTPA Sanctioned Tournaments
Champions Trophy	NH		A	A	RR	NH		A	1R	QF		0 / 2	1–2	33%
US Pro	A	A	A	A	A	NH	A	A	QF	1R		0 / 2	1–2	33%
Win–loss	0–0	0–0	0–0	0–0	0–0	0–0	0–0	0–0	1–2	1–2	0–0	0 / 4	2–4	33%
Career Statistics
	2015	2016	2017	2018	2019	2020	2021	2022	2023	2024	2025	Career		
Tournaments	1	1	1	0	1	0	1	3	5	5	1	Career total: 19		
Titles	0	0	0	0	0	0	0	0	0	0	0	Career total: 0		
Finals	0	0	0	0	0	0	0	0	0	0	0	Career total: 0		
Overall win–loss	0–1	1–1	0–1	0–0	0–1	0–0	1–1	1–3	4–5	3–5	1–1	11–19		37%
Win %	0%	50%	0%	–	0%	–	50%	25%	44%	38%	50%	Career total: 37%		

=== Doubles ===
Tournament	2015	2016	2017	2018	2019	2020	2021	2022	2023	2024	2025	SR	W–L	Win %
World Championship
Win–loss	0–0	0–0	0–0	0–0	0–0	0–0	0–0	0–0	0–0	0–0	0–0	0 / 0	0–0	–
Grand Slam tournaments
British Open	1R	A	QF	A	QF	NH	1R	QF	QF	QF		0 / 7	4–7	36%
French Open	A	A	A	A	A	NH		QF	QF	SF		0 / 3	1–3	25%
US Open	A	QF	A	A	A	A	A	QF	QF	SF	QF	0 / 5	5–5	50%
Win–loss	0–1	1–1	1–1	0–0	1–1	0–0	0–1	2–3	0–3	4–3	1–1	0 / 15	10–15	40%
IRTPA Sanctioned Tournaments
Win–loss	0–0	0–0	0–0	0–0	0–0	0–0	0–0	0–0	0–0	0–0	0–0	0 / 0	0–0	–
Career Statistics
	2015	2016	2017	2018	2019	2020	2021	2022	2023	2024	2025	Career		
Tournaments	1	1	1	0	1	0	1	3	3	3	1	Career total: 15		
Titles	0	0	0	0	0	0	0	0	0	0	0	Career total: 0		
Finals	0	0	0	0	0	0	0	0	0	0	0	Career total: 0		
Overall win–loss	0–1	1–1	1–1	0–0	1–1	0–0	0–1	2–3	0–3	4–3	1–1	10–15		40%
Win %	0%	50%	50%	–	50%	–	0%	40%	0%	57%	50%	Career total: 40%		
