= 1998 US Open (court tennis) =

48th edition of the US Open

- Date: 16–25 January (men); 15–17 May (women)
- Edition: 48th (men); 16th (women)
- Draw: 18S
- Location: Boston, Massachusetts (men); Newport, Rhode Island (women)
- Venue: Tennis and Racquet Club (men); International Tennis Hall of Fame (women)

Champions

Men's singles
- (United Kingdom) Chris Bray

Women's singles
- (United Kingdom) Penny Lumley

Men's doubles
- (United Kingdom) Ruaraidh Gunn / (Australia) Steve Virgona

Women's doubles
- (United Kingdom) Penny Lumley / (United Kingdom) Fiona Deuchar
← 1997 ·	US Open (court tennis)	· 1999 →

The 1998 Court Tennis US Open was the 48th edition of the US Open. The men's event was held at the Tennis and Racquet Club in Boston, Massachusetts between January 16–25, 1998 and was organised by the United States Court Tennis Association. Winners of the singles draw were eligible to challenge for the 2000 Real Tennis World Championship. The women's event was held at the International Tennis Hall of Fame in Newport, Rhode Island between May 15–17, 1998. The men's draw was the first grand slam event of the year.

The men's singles draw was won by Chris Bray. It would be his first and only US Open title of his career. His victories in the 1997 Australian Open and 1997 British Open meant that he would hold three of the four Open titles concurrently. He defeated defending champion Julian Snow in the final, having lost to him the previous month in the eliminators of the 1998 Real Tennis World Championship. The doubles draw was won by Ruaraidh Gunn and Steve Virgona, both players first Open doubles titles. The women's draw was won by Penny Lumley, defending her title from 1997. She would partner with Fiona Deuchar to win the doubles title, having defeated Deuchar in the singles final.

== Draw and results ==
=== Men's Singles Qualifying ===
==== First Qualifier ====
Finals
1	(United Kingdom) M Eadle	5	6	6
2	(United States) R Whitehouse	6	3	5

==== Second Qualifier ====
Finals
1	(United States) W Simonds	6	6
2	(United States) J Faulise	1	1

=== Men's Singles ===
First round
(United Kingdom) C Bray	6	6	6
(United Kingdom) A Lyons	0	3	2
(United Kingdom) A Phillips	6	6	6
(United States) J Burke	3	4	3
(United Kingdom) N Wood	6	6	3	6
(United Kingdom) N Pendrigh	2	0	6	2
(United Kingdom) J Male	6	6	6
(United Kingdom) M Eadle	4	1	0
(United Kingdom) J Snow	6	6	6
(United States) G Wharton	0	2	1
(United Kingdom) R Gunn	6	6	6
(United States) W Simonds	1	2	1
(Australia) S Virgona	0	6	6	6
(Australia) J Howell	6	2	3	5
(United Kingdom) M Gooding	6	6	6
(United States) M Noll	0	0	1

Quarter-finals
(United Kingdom) C Bray
(United Kingdom) A Phillips
(United Kingdom) N Wood	4	2	6	6	5
(United Kingdom) J Male	6	6	3	5	6
(United Kingdom) J Snow	6	6	6
(United Kingdom) R Gunn	5	1	3
(Australia) S Virgona	3	4	2
(United Kingdom) M Gooding	6	6	6

Semi-finals
(United Kingdom) C Bray	6	6	6
(United Kingdom) J Male	3	5	3
(United Kingdom) J Snow	6	6	6
(United Kingdom) M Gooding	5	2	4

Final
(United Kingdom) C Bray	3	6	6	6
(United Kingdom) J Snow	6	4	4	5

=== Men's Doubles ===
Note: results are only available for the semi finals onwards

Semifinals						Finals
(United Kingdom) R Gunn (Australia) S Virgona	2	3	6	6	6
(United Kingdom) J Snow (United Kingdom) J Male	6	6	3	4	5	(United Kingdom) R Gunn (Australia) S Virgona	6	6	6
(United Kingdom) A Lyons (United States) W Symonds	6	5	2			(United Kingdom) A Lyons (United States) W Symonds	1	1	1
(United Kingdom) N Wood (United Kingdom) A Phillips	0	6	2

=== Women's Singles ===
Note: results are only available from the semi finals onwards

Semifinals			Finals
(United Kingdom) P Lumley	6	6
(United States) B Sabbag	0	0	(United Kingdom) P Lumley	6	6
(United Kingdom) F Deuchar	6	6	(United Kingdom) F Deuchar	0	0
(United States) J Lippincott	3	2

=== Women's Doubles ===
Note: results are only available from the semi finals onwards

Semifinals			Finals
(United Kingdom) P Lumley (United Kingdom) F Deuchar	6	6
(United States) E David (United States) J Carli	0	0	(United Kingdom) P Lumley (United Kingdom) F Deuchar	6	6
(United States) J Lippincott (United Kingdom) B Sabbag	6	6	(United States) J Lippincott (United Kingdom) B Sabbag	0	3
(United Kingdom) S Reilly (United Kingdom) S Falkner	4	0

== See also ==
- Grand Slam (real tennis)
