= 2025 Champions Trophy (real tennis) =

- Date: 22-27 July
- Edition: 76th
- Category: IRTPA
- Draw: 8S / 8Q
- Location: Hampton Court Palace, London, United Kingdom
- Venue: Royal Tennis Court

Champions

Men's singles
- (United Kingdom) John Lumley
← 2024 ·	Champions Trophy (real tennis)	· 2026 →

The 2025 Champions Trophy was the 7th edition of the Champions Trophy. It was held at the Royal Tennis Court from 22-27 July. It was a qualifying event for the 2027 Real Tennis World Championship.

The format of the event was the same as the previous edition. The event was won by John Lumley, his second victory in the tournament having missed the 2024 edition. He defeated defending champion Nick Howell in the final. World Champion Camden Riviere was not in attendance.

== Draw and results ==
Amateur players are marked as (A)

=== Qualifying ===
The qualifying is split over two groups, with the winners of each group progressing to the main draw.

==== Group A ====
		(United Kingdom) Williams	(United Kingdom) Gale	(United Kingdom) Vallat	(United Kingdom) Durack	W–L	Set W–L	Game W–L	Standings
7	(United Kingdom) L Williams		3/9	4/9	9/2	1–2	1–2	16–20	3rd
9	(United Kingdom) L Gale	9/3		5/9	9/0	2–1	2–1	23–12	2nd
11	(United Kingdom) B Vallat (Q, A)	9/4	9/5		9/3	3–0	3–0	27–12	1st
13	(United Kingdom) T Durack	2/9	0/9	3/9		0–3	0–3	5–27	4th

==== Group B ====
		(United Kingdom) Long	(United Kingdom) Hamilton	(United Kingdom) Gordon	(United Kingdom) Josephs	W–L	Set W–L	Game W–L	Standings
8	(United Kingdom) D Long (Q)		9/8	9/6	9/1	3–0	3–0	27–15	1st
10	(United Kingdom) V Hamilton	8/9		9/2	9/1	2–1	2–1	26–17	2nd
12	(United Kingdom) L Gordon	6/9	2/9		9/5	1–2	1–2	17–23	3rd
14	(United Kingdom) J Josephs	1/9	1/9	5/9		0–3	0–3	7–27	4th

=== Main Draw ===
The Champions Trophy operates with a repechage format for the first four seeds, where the first round losers progress to a second quarter final against the winners between the fifth and sixth seeds and the qualifiers.

First quarter finals
1	(United Kingdom) J Lumley	5	6
4	(United Kingdom) L Smart	6	3
6	(United Kingdom) B Sayers	5
Q	(United Kingdom) D Long	2
5	(United Kingdom) R Shenkman (A)	6	6
Q	(United Kingdom) B Vallat (A)	4	4
3	(United Kingdom) B Taylor-Matthews	4	0
2	(Australia) N Howell	6	6

Second quarter finals
4	(United Kingdom) L Smart	0	6	2
6	(United Kingdom) B Sayers	6	5	6
5	(United Kingdom) R Shenkman (A)	3	1
3	(United Kingdom) B Taylor-Matthews	6	6

Semi finals
1	(United Kingdom) J Lumley	6	6
3	(United Kingdom) B Taylor-Matthews	4	2
6	(United Kingdom) B Sayers	1	3
2	(Australia) N Howell	6	6

Final
1	(United Kingdom) J Lumley	6	6
2	(Australia) N Howell	2	0
