= Leon Smart =

British real tennis player

- Full name: Leon Smart
- Country (sports): United Kingdom
- Residence: United States
- Born: 23 April 1992 (age 33)
- Plays: Right-handed
- Club: Tennis and Racquet Club, Boston

Singles
- Career titles: 0
- Highest ranking: 7
- Current ranking: 7

Grand Slam singles results
- Australian Open: 1R (2017)
- British Open: SF (2024)
- French Open: SF (2024)
- US Open: SF (2022)

Doubles
- Career titles: 0
- Highest ranking: 8
- Current ranking: 8

Grand Slam doubles results
- Australian Open: QF (2017)
- French Open: F (2023, 2024)
- British Open: F (2024)
- US Open: SF (2021, 2022, 2023)

Leon Smart (born 23 April 1992) is a professional British real tennis player currently based at the Tennis and Racquet Club in Boston, Massachusetts. He is currently ranked seventh in the world at singles and tenth at doubles. His best result was reaching the semi finals of the US Open singles in 2022 and the French Open singles in 2024.

== Career ==
Smart began his career as a lawn tennis player, playing in the ITF Futures. He discovered real tennis as a student at Middlesex University in 2010 and joined the university team on an internship program. Upon graduating, he was appointed as the assistant professional at the Middlesex University Real Tennis Club. In 2014, he reached the final of the Taylor Cup, a tournament for new professionals, losing to Lewis Williams. That year, he also entered British Open qualifying for the first time, but lost in the first round to Craig Greenhalgh.

In 2015, Smart moved to the United States, taking up the role as assistant professional at the Tennis and Racquet Club in Boston. He made his US Open debut, losing in the first round to women's World Champion Claire Fahey. He won his first Open match at that year's French Open, beating Frenchman Benjamin Jacquin-Turrettini in the first round, but losing to incumbent World Champion Robert Fahey. At the start of 2016, he won the British Under 24 Open against Ed Kay at his alma mater of Middlesex University. Later that season, he was a finalist at the US Professional Satellite, losing to Darren Long.

Smart began touring in ernest in 2017, playing his first and to date only Australian Open. He lost in the first round of each of the Australian, French and US Opens, the exception being in the first round of the US Open doubles. 2018 was slightly more successful, with first match victories at the US Open against Adam Player and at the British Open against Josh Smith.

In 2019, Smart moved to the Tuxedo Club in New York to work under Tim Chisholm. That year he won the US Professional Singles satellite in a harbinger of his successes yet to come. However, any prospect of international play was abandoned due to the cancellation of tournaments because of the COVID-19 pandemic. Amid travel restrictions preventing a full participation, Smart reached the quarter finals of the 2021 US Open and the semi finals of the 2021 US Professional Singles.

Once play had returned to normal in 2022, Smart had his best season yet, defeating top 10 player Chris Chapman in the quarter final of the 2022 US Open at his home court in Tuxedo. Smart also reached a British Open quarter final for the first time after defeating John Woods-Casey. His performances over the season brought him into the top 10 in the world for the first time. In doubles, he reached the semi final stage at both the French and US Opens partnering with Chapman and Darren Long respectively. At the end of the season, he moved back to the Tennis and Racquet Club, this time as head professional.

Across 2023, Smart cemented his place in the top 10 with quarter final appearances at the French and US Opens. He played his first Open final at the French Open doubles, partnered with Nick Howell but losing to Steve Virgona and Ben Taylor-Matthews in straight sets. His other notable result was a semi-final at the US Professional Singles, defeating Robert Shenkman 6/5 6/5 6/5 in the quarter final.

In 2024, Smart reached his first French Open semi final after defeating Lewis Williams in the quarter final. He also reached his second doubles final at the same event, partnered with Steve Virgona but losing to Nick Howell and Camden Riviere. At that year's British Open, he made his first semi final appearance following a retirement by former World Champion Robert Fahey in the second set of their quarter final. He also reached the final of the doubles draw at that event, partnered with Howell.

== Performance timeline ==
=== Singles ===
Key
W	F	SF	QF	#R	RR	Q#	DNQ	A	NH

(W) winner; (F) finalist; (SF) semifinalist; (QF) quarterfinalist; (#R) rounds 4, 3, 2, 1; (RR) round-robin stage; (Q#) qualification round; (DNQ) did not qualify; (A) absent; (NH) not held; (SR) strike rate (events won / competed); (W–L) win–loss record.
To avoid confusion and double counting, these charts are updated at the conclusion of a tournament or when the player's participation has ended.

Current through the 2025 US Open

Tournament	2014	2015	2016	2017	2018	2019	2020	2021	2022	2023	2024	2025	SR	W–L	Win %
Grand Slam tournaments
Australian Open	A	A	A	1R	A	A	A	NH	A	A	A	A	0 / 1	0–1	0%
British Open	Q1	A	A	A	2R	A	NH	A	QF	2R	SF		0 / 4	4–4	50%
French Open	A	QF	A	1R	1R	A	NH		1R	QF	SF		0 / 6	4–6	40%
US Open	A	1R	2R	1R	2R	2R	2R	QF	SF	QF	QF	QF	0 / 11	7–11	39%
Win–loss	0–0	1–2	0–1	0–3	2–3	0–1	0–1	1–1	3–3	2–3	5–3	1–1	0 / 22	15–22	41%
IRTPA Sanctioned Tournaments
Champions Trophy	NH			A	A	A	NH		A	QF	1R		0 / 2	0–3	0%
IRTPA Championship	1R	A	NH	A	QF	A	NH						0 / 2	1–2	33%
US Pro	A	Q1	2R	2R	QF	1R	NH	SF	2R	SF	QF		0 / 8	5–8	38%
Win–loss	0–1	0–0	0–1	0–1	2–2	0–1	0–0	1–1	0–1	2–3	1–2	0–0	0 / 12	6–13	32%
Career Statistics
	2014	2015	2016	2017	2018	2019	2020	2021	2022	2023	2024	2025	Career		
Tournaments	1	2	2	4	5	2	1	2	4	5	5	1	Career total: 34		
Titles	0	0	0	0	0	0	0	0	0	0	0	0	Career total: 0		
Finals	0	0	0	0	0	0	0	0	0	0	0	0	Career total: 0		
Overall win–loss	0–1	1–2	0–2	0–4	4–5	0–2	0–1	2–2	3–4	4–6	6–5	1–1	21–35		38%
Win %	0%	33%	0%	0%	44%	0%	0%	50%	43%	40%	55%	50%	Career total: 38%		

=== Doubles ===
Tournament	2015	2016	2017	2018	2019	2020	2021	2022	2023	2024	2025	SR	W–L	Win %
Grand Slam tournaments
Australian Open	A	A	QF	A	A	A	NH	A	A	A	A	0 / 1	0–1	0%
British Open	A	A	A	QF	A	NH	A	QF	1R	F		0 / 4	4–4	50%
French Open	A	A	QF	QF	A	NH		SF	F	F		0 / 5	4–5	44%
US Open	QF	QF	QF	QF	QF	QF	SF	SF	SF	QF	QF	0 / 11	9–11	45%
Win–loss	1–1	1–1	1–3	1–3	0–1	0–1	1–1	4–3	3–3	4–3	1–1	0 / 21	17–21	45%
IRTPA Sanctioned Tournaments
IRTPA Championship	NH	A	QF	A	NH							0 / 1	0–1	0%
Win–loss	0–0	0–0	0–1	0–0	0–0	0–0	0–0	0–0	0–0	0–0	0–0	0 / 1	0–1	0%
Career Statistics
	2015	2016	2017	2018	2019	2020	2021	2022	2023	2024	2025	Career		
Tournaments	1	1	4	3	1	1	1	3	3	3	1	Career total: 22		
Titles	0	0	0	0	0	0	0	0	0	0	0	Career total: 0		
Finals	0	0	0	0	0	0	0	0	1	2	0	Career total: 3		
Overall win–loss	1–1	1–1	1–4	1–3	0–1	0–1	1–1	4–3	3–3	4–3	1–1	17–22		44%
Win %	50%	50%	20%	25%	0%	0%	50%	57%	50%	57%	50%	Career total: 44%		
