= 2023 French Open (real tennis) =

2023 Open de France du Jeu de Paume
- Date: 24 September-1 October
- Edition: 41st
- Category: IRTPA (men); None (women)
- Draw: 16S / 8D (men); 8S / 4D (women)
- Location: Paris, France
- Venue: Société Sportive du Jeu de Paume & de Racquets

Champions

Men's singles
- (Australia) Nick Howell

Women's singles
- (United Kingdom) Claire Fahey

Men's doubles
- (United Kingdom) Ben Taylor-Matthews / (Australia) Steve Virgona

Women's doubles
- (United Kingdom) Claire Fahey / (United Kingdom) Tara Lumley
← 2022 ·	Open de France du Jeu de Paume	· 2024 →

The 2023 French Open also known as the 2023 Open de France du Jeu de Paume was the 41st edition of the real tennis French Open. The event was held at the Société Sportive du Jeu de Paume & de Racquets in Paris between September 24 and October 1, 2023, and was organised by the Comité Français de Courte-Paume, forming part of the qualifying series for the 2025 Real Tennis World Championship. The event was held days after the 2023 Real Tennis World Championship meaning that world top 2 Camden Riviere and John Lumley were not in attendance. The men's draw was the third grand slam event of the year.

The men's singles draw was won by Nick Howell, his first singles Open victory. The men's doubles draw was won by Steve Virgona and Ben Taylor-Matthews, having previously won the 2010 US Open as a pairing. The women's singles draw was won by incumbent World Champion Claire Fahey. She also won the doubles draw with Tara Lumley, the pairing having previously won the 2019 edition.

The event featured the debut of Oliver Pridmore at the French Open, where he reached the quarter final stage for the first time at any Open.

== Draw and results ==
Amateur players are marked as (A)

=== Men's Singles ===
First round
1	(United Kingdom) B Taylor-Matthews	6	6	6
(United Kingdom) N Mackenzie	2	1	3
(United Kingdom) J Smith	6	6	5	2	4
(United Kingdom) L Williams	5	4	6	6	6
6	(France) M Sarlangue (A)	3	6	6	6
(United Kingdom) Z Eadle	6	2	3	1
(United Kingdom) D Long	3	1	3
3	(Australia) S Virgona	6	6	6
4	(United Kingdom) L Smart	2	6	2	6	6
(United Kingdom) L Gale	6	1	6	1	2
(United Kingdom) L Gordon	1	2	1
5	(United Kingdom) B Sayers	6	6	6
(Australia) O Pridmore (A)	6	4	6	6
(France) N Victoir	5	6	4	4
(United Kingdom) R Shenkman (A)	5	2	0
2	(Australia) N Howell	6	6	6

Quarter-finals
1	(United Kingdom) B Taylor-Matthews	6	6	6
(United Kingdom) L Williams	4	4	5
6	(France) M Sarlangue (A)	0	3	5
3	(Australia) S Virgona	6	6	6
4	(United Kingdom) L Smart	2	3	2
5	(United Kingdom) B Sayers	6	6	6
(Australia) O Pridmore (A)	4	2	1
2	(Australia) N Howell	6	6	6

Semi-finals
1	(United Kingdom) B Taylor-Matthews	3	1	1
3	(Australia) S Virgona	6	6	6
5	(United Kingdom) B Sayers	6	5	4	6	3
2	(Australia) N Howell	3	6	6	2	6

Final
3	(Australia) S Virgona	5	5	1
2	(Australia) N Howell	6	6	6

=== Men's Doubles ===
Quarterfinals
1	(Australia) N Howell (United Kingdom) L Smart	6	6	6
(United Kingdom) L Gale (United Kingdom) L Williams	5	1	2
(United Kingdom) D Long (United Kingdom) R Shenkman (A)	2	6	1	4
4	(United Kingdom) B Sayers (United Kingdom) L Gordon	6	2	6	6
3	(Australia) R Fahey (United Kingdom) R McNaughtan	3	5	6	6	6
(France) M Sarlangue (A) (France) N Victoir (A)	6	6	1	4	2
(United Kingdom) J Smith (United Kingdom) N Mackenzie	1	1	1
2	(United Kingdom) B Taylor-Matthews (Australia) S Virgona	6	6	6

Semifinals
1	(Australia) N Howell (United Kingdom) L Smart	6	3	6	6
4	(United Kingdom) B Sayers (United Kingdom) L Gordon	5	6	1	3
3	(Australia) R Fahey (United Kingdom) R McNaughtan	4	0	6	4
2	(United Kingdom) B Taylor-Matthews (Australia) S Virgona	6	6	5	6

Finals
1	(Australia) N Howell (United Kingdom) L Smart	3	5	2
2	(United Kingdom) B Taylor-Matthews (Australia) S Virgona	6	6	6

=== Women's Singles ===
Note: all players are amateurs except Claire Fahey

Quarterfinals
1	(United Kingdom) C Fahey	6	6
(Australia) X Ranger	0	0
(United Kingdom) J Garside	1	1
4	(Netherlands) S Bollerman	1	2
3	(United Kingdom) T Lumley	6	6
(United Kingdom) I Candy	1	0
(Australia) JS Tan	0	0
2	(France) L van der Zwalmen	6	6

Semifinals
1	(United Kingdom) C Fahey	6	6
4	(Netherlands) S Bollerman	3	0
3	(United Kingdom) T Lumley	4	0
2	(France) L van der Zwalmen	6	6

Finals
1	(United Kingdom) C Fahey	6	6
2	(France) L van der Zwalmen	5	1

=== Women's Doubles ===
Note: all players are amateurs except Claire Fahey

Semifinals				Finals
1	(United Kingdom) C Fahey (United Kingdom) T Lumley	6	6
4	(Australia) JS Tan (United Kingdom) A Brodie	0	1	1	(United Kingdom) C Fahey (United Kingdom) T Lumley	6	6
	(United Kingdom) J Garside (United Kingdom) I Candy	2	0	2	(Netherlands) S Bollerman (United Kingdom) L van der Zwalmen	5	2
2	(Netherlands) S Bollerman (France) L van der Zwlamen	6	6

== See also ==
- Grand Slam (real tennis)
