= 2023 Champions Trophy (real tennis) =

- Date: 18-23 July
- Edition: 5th
- Category: IRTPA
- Draw: 8S / 4Q
- Location: Hampton Court Palace, London, United Kingdom
- Venue: Royal Tennis Court

Champions

Men's singles
- (Australia) Nick Howell
← 2022 ·	Champions Trophy (real tennis)	· 2024 →

The 2023 Champions Trophy was the 5th edition of the Champions Trophy. It was held at the Royal Tennis Court from 18 to 23 July It was a qualifying event for the 2025 Real Tennis World Championship.

Defending champion Robert Fahey did not participate, having announced his retirement from singles tennis at the conclusion of the 2022 British Open (although he would make a comeback at the 2024 US Open). Incumbent World Champion Camden Riviere also did not attend. The event was won by John Lumley for the first time, having been runner-up in 2019. Ben Taylor-Matthews was the runner-up for the second consecutive year, and for the third time overall.

== Draw and results ==
Amateur players are marked as (A)

=== Qualifying ===
The qualifying was one group of four players, with the top two players progressing to the main draw. With the progression determined after four matches, the final two matches were scratched with no winner declared.

		(France) Sarlangue	(United Kingdom) Shenkman	(United Kingdom) Long	(United Kingdom) Williams	W–L	Set W–L	Game W–L	Standings
7	(France) M Sarlangue (Q, A)		–	9/4	9/5	2–0	2–0 (100%)	18–9 (67%)	2nd
8	(United Kingdom) R Shenkman (Q, A)	–		9/7	9/2	2–0	2–0 (100%)	18–9 (67%)	1st
9	(United Kingdom) D Long	4/9	7/9		–	0–2	0–2 (0%)	11–18 (38%)	3rd
10	(United Kingdom) L Williams	5/9	2/9	–		0–2	0–2 (0%)	7–18 (28%)	4th

=== Main Draw ===
The Champions Trophy operates a repechage format for the first four seeds, where the first round losers progress to a second quarter final against the winners between the fifth and sixth seeds and the qualifiers.

First quarter finals
1	(United Kingdom) J Lumley	6	6	6
3	(Australia) N Howell	2	4	4
5	(Australia) S Virgona	6	6	6
Q	(France) M Sarlangue (A)	3	4	0
6	(United Kingdom) B Sayers	5	6	6	6
Q	(United Kingdom) R Shenkman (A)	6	5	3	3
4	(United Kingdom) L Smart	2	1	1
2	(United Kingdom) B Taylor-Matthews	6	6	6

Second quarter finals
3	(Australia) N Howell	4	6	5	4
5	(Australia) S Virgona	6	3	6	6
6	(United Kingdom) B Sayers	6	6	4	6
4	(United Kingdom) L Smart	4	5	6	0

Semi finals
1	(United Kingdom) J Lumley	4	6	6	2	6
6	(United Kingdom) B Sayers	6	5	0	6	0
5	(Australia) S Virgona	3	2	6	1
2	(United Kingdom) B Taylor-Matthews	6	6	2	6

Final
1	(United Kingdom) J Lumley	6	6	6
2	(United Kingdom) B Taylor-Matthews	2	5	1
