= John Lumley (real tennis) =

British real tennis player

- Full name: John Colin Lumley
- Country (sports): United Kingdom
- Residence: United States
- Born: 7 August 1992 (age 34)
- Turned pro: 2010
- Plays: Right-handed
- Club: Racquet Club of Philadelphia

World Championships
- Open Singles: Challenger (2023)
- Open Doubles: F (2022, 2024)

Singles
- Career titles: 5
- Highest ranking: 2
- Current ranking: 2

Grand Slam singles results
- Australian Open: W (2022, 2024)
- British Open: W (2021)
- French Open: SF (2019)
- US Open: W (2025)

Doubles
- Career titles: 8
- Highest ranking: 2
- Current ranking: 3

Grand Slam doubles results
- Australian Open: W (2022, 2024)
- French Open: W (2016, 2018, 2019, 2022)
- British Open: W (2019, 2022)
- US Open: F (2021, 2024, 2025)

John Colin Lumley (born August 7, 1992) is a British professional real tennis player currently ranked at number 2 in the world. He unsuccessfully challenged Camden Riviere for the 2023 Real Tennis World Championship at Westwood Country Club in Vienna, Virginia. He currently works as the assistant professional at the Racquet Club of Philadelphia.

== Career ==
John Lumley started playing real tennis as a junior at Holyport Real Tennis Club. His father, Colin Lumley was a real tennis professional and two-time Australian Open champion while his mother, Penny Lumley was a 6-time Ladies Real Tennis World Champion and 28-time Open Champion. His sister, Tara Lumley would also compete in both real tennis and Rackets, winning two Open Championships and two doubles World Championships in the former sport. As a junior, John Lumley won the British Junior Open at the Under 16 level against future top 10 Frenchman Matthieu Sarlangue, and at the Under 18 level against future professional Neil Mackenzie.

John Lumley turned professional in 2010 at Radley College under former World Champion Chris Ronaldson. He entered qualifying for the British Open Championships for the first time in 2009, losing to Adam Player. As a professional, he won the Taylor Cup in 2011 – a tournament for professionals less than three years into their careers – and reached the semi-final of the Satellite Draw at the 2012 US Professional Singles in Newport, Rhode Island, his first international tournament. He also won the British Under 21's Open in 2012 and 2013, and the British Under 24's Open in 2012, 2013 and 2014. He reached the first round of the British Open for the first time in 2011 and won his first IRTPA-sanctioned match at the US Professional Singles in 2012. In doubles, he reached the final of the 2012 French Open playing alongside doubles World Champion Steve Virgona.

In 2013, Lumley moved to Philadelphia to take up a role as the assistant professional. Shortly afterwards, he recorded his so-far only win against then-future World Champion Camden Riviere at the USCTA National League. He won two-second-tier tournaments in 2015, the Satellite draw of the US Pro Singles against Women's World Champion Claire Fahey, as well as the US National at Tuxedo. During the former tournament, his handicap dropped below scratch for the first time. By 2016, Lumley was regularly reaching the quarter final stage at major tournaments. By 2016, Lumley was regularly reaching the singles quarter final stage at major tournaments. In doubles, he won the 2016 French Open with singles World Champion Camden Riviere, a feat he would repeat in 2018 and 2019 with Ben Taylor-Matthews and Riviere respectively. His breakthrough singles victory came at the 2018 IRTPA Championships against World Champion Robert Fahey, his first victory against Fahey in all competitions. He also reached the final of the 2019 Champions Trophy, losing to Fahey in the final. However, a quarter final loss against Ben Taylor-Matthews at the 2019 British Open meant that he failed to qualify for the 2020 Real Tennis World Championship.

The 2020 season started well for Lumley, winning the Governor's Cup in Hobart against Chris Chapman and reaching the semi-final at the Australian Open. However, following the US Open in February, the remaining events in the calendar where cancelled due to the COVID-19 pandemic. Due to travel restrictions, he was only able to compete in US-based tournaments through much of 2020 and 2021, although he did reach the finals of the US Open and US Professional Singles. In November 2021, Lumley competed in the British Open at Queen's defeating Robert Fahey in the semi-finals and Ben Taylor-Matthews in the final to claim his first Open title. In the next 12 months, he won his second Open title at the 2022 Australian Open in Melbourne defeating Nick Howell in the final in five sets. In doubles, he also won three of four Opens, partnering with Kieran Booth for the Australian Open and Camden Riviere for the British and French Opens. Lumley partnered with Steve Virgona at the 2022 World Doubles Championship in Bordeaux, reaching the final against Riviere and Tim Chisholm. He would go on to partner Virgona for the proceeding 2023 and 2024 seasons.

In 2023, Lumley reached a career high ranking of number 2 in the world. He won the 2023 Champions Trophy at the Royal Tennis Court at Hampton Court Palace and reached the finals of the British and US Opens, losing only to Camden Riviere. Since the start of 2023, Riviere is the only opponent who has beaten Lumley in all competitions. By virtue of his performance in the 2020–2022 World Race, Lumley qualified into the World Championship Eliminators for the 2023 Real Tennis World Championship. As the first seed, Lumley had preferred bidding for hosting rights for the first round eliminator, successfully bidding for it to be hosted at the Racquet Club of Philadelphia. There, he played Chris Chapman, beating him 5 sets to 2. In the second round, Lumley played against Nick Howell, also at the Racquet Club of Philadelphia, winning 7 sets to 1 and qualifying to challenge Camden Riviere for the World Championship.

The 2023 World Championship was held at the Westwood Country Club in Vienna, Virginia, held as a best of 13 set format over 3 days. On the first day, Riviere won all four sets, and needed only three more to reclaim his title. However, Lumley fought back on the second day, winning three of four available sets. On the third day, Lumley was unable to win any more sets and ultimately lost his first challenge.

Lumley's form has continued into 2024, winning the Australian Open in January and was a finalist at the US Open for the second consecutive year. He again partnered Steve Virgona at the World Doubles Championships in Chicago, in a rematch of the previous edition against Riviere and Chisholm, but lost 5 sets to 2. He also reached the final of the US Open Rackets Doubles at his home club of Racquet Club of Philadelphia, playing with Freddie Bristowe but losing to Will Hopton and singles World Champion Ben Cawston.

At the 2025 US Open, Lumley became the first player in all competitions since 2018, and the first player outside a World Championship since 2013 to defeat Riviere in a singles match, beating him in the final to win his first US Open title. He followed that up with a victory at the Champions Trophy, defeating defending champion Howell in the final.

In 2026, Lumley married his wife, Elizabeth, in a private ceremony attended by family and close friends.

== Performance timeline ==
=== Singles ===
Key
| W | F | SF | QF | #R | RR | Q# | DNQ | A | NH |

(W) winner; (F) finalist; (SF) semifinalist; (QF) quarterfinalist; (#R) rounds 4, 3, 2, 1; (RR) round-robin stage; (Q#) qualification round; (DNQ) did not qualify; (A) absent; (NH) not held; (SR) strike rate (events won / competed); (W–L) win–loss record.
To avoid confusion and double counting, these charts are updated at the conclusion of a tournament or when the player's participation has ended.

Current through the 2025 Champions Trophy

| Tournament | 2009 | 2010 | 2011 | 2012 | 2013 | 2014 | 2015 | 2016 | 2017 | 2018 | 2019 | 2020 | 2021 | 2022 | 2023 | 2024 | 2025 | SR | W–L | Win % |
|---|---|---|---|---|---|---|---|---|---|---|---|---|---|---|---|---|---|---|---|---|
World Championship
| World Championship | NH | DNQ | NH | DNQ | NH | DNQ | NH | DNQ | NH | DNQ | NH | | | DNQ | F | NH | TBC | 0 / 2 | 4–1 | 80% |
| Win–loss | 0–0 | 0–0 | 0–0 | 0–0 | 0–0 | 0–0 | 0–0 | 0–0 | 0–0 | 0–0 | 0–0 | 0–0 | 0–0 | 0–0 | 2–1 | 0–0 | 2–0 | 0 / 2 | 4–1 | 80% |
Grand Slam tournaments
| Australian Open | A | A | A | A | QF | A | A | SF | 1R | A | A | SF | NH | W | A | W | A | 2 / 6 | 11–4 | 73% |
| British Open | Q1 | Q3 | 1R | 2R | 2R | 2R | A | 2R | A | 2R | QF | NH | W | SF | F | A | | 1 / 10 | 15–9 | 63% |
| French Open | A | A | A | 1R | A | A | A | QF | 1R | QF | SF | NH | | QF | A | A | | 0 / 6 | 5–6 | 45% |
| US Open | A | A | A | A | 2R | QF | 2R | QF | QF | QF | QF | QF | F | SF | F | F | W | 1 / 13 | 23–12 | 66% |
| Win–loss | 0–0 | 0–0 | 0–1 | 1–2 | 2–3 | 2–2 | 1–1 | 5–4 | 2–3 | 3–3 | 4–3 | 2–2 | 7–1 | 8–3 | 6–2 | 7–1 | 4–0 | 4 / 35 | 54–31 | 64% |
IRTPA Sanctioned Tournaments
| Champions Trophy | NH | | | | | | | | QF | QF | F | NH | | SF | W | A | W | 2 / 6 | 12–4 | 75% |
| European Open | A | NH | A | Q1 | A | NH | A | NH | | | | | | | | | NH | 0 / 0 | 0–0 | – |
| IRTPA Championship | A | Q1 | 1R | QF | A | QF | A | NH | QF | W | SF | NH | | | | | | 1 / 6 | 9–5 | 64% |
| US Pro | A | A | 1R | QF | 1R | 1R | 1R | QF | QF | A | QF | NH | F | SF | F | F | SF | 0 / 13 | 16–13 | 55% |
| Win–loss | 0–0 | 0–0 | 0–2 | 2–2 | 0–1 | 1–2 | 0–1 | 1–1 | 3–3 | 5–1 | 6–3 | 0–0 | 2–1 | 3–2 | 6–1 | 3–1 | 5–1 | 3 / 25 | 37–22 | 63% |
Career Statistics
| | 2009 | 2010 | 2011 | 2012 | 2013 | 2014 | 2015 | 2016 | 2017 | 2018 | 2019 | 2020 | 2021 | 2022 | 2023 | 2024 | 2025 | Career | | |
| Tournaments | 0 | 0 | 3 | 4 | 4 | 4 | 2 | 5 | 6 | 5 | 6 | 2 | 3 | 6 | 5 | 3 | 4 | Career total: 62 | | |
| Titles | 0 | 0 | 0 | 0 | 0 | 0 | 0 | 0 | 0 | 1 | 0 | 0 | 1 | 1 | 1 | 1 | 2 | Career total: 7 | | |
| Finals | 0 | 0 | 0 | 0 | 0 | 0 | 0 | 0 | 0 | 1 | 1 | 0 | 3 | 1 | 5 | 3 | 2 | Career total: 16 | | |
| Overall win–loss | 0–0 | 0–0 | 0–3 | 3–4 | 2–4 | 3–4 | 1–2 | 6–5 | 5–6 | 8–4 | 10–6 | 2–2 | 9–2 | 11–5 | 14–4 | 10–2 | 11–1 | 95–54 | | 64% |
| Win % | – | – | 0% | 43% | 33% | 43% | 33% | 55% | 45% | 67% | 63% | 50% | 82% | 69% | 78% | 83% | 92% | Career total: 64% | | |

=== Doubles ===
| Tournament | 2009 | 2010 | 2011 | 2012 | 2013 | 2014 | 2015 | 2016 | 2017 | 2018 | 2019 | 2020 | 2021 | 2022 | 2023 | 2024 | 2025 | SR | W–L | Win % |
|---|---|---|---|---|---|---|---|---|---|---|---|---|---|---|---|---|---|---|---|---|
World Championship
| World Championship | DNQ | NH | DNQ | NH | DNQ | NH | QF | NH | SF | NH | DNQ | NH | | W | NH | F | | 1 / 4 | 4–4 | 50% |
| Win–loss | 0–0 | 0–0 | 0–0 | 0–0 | 0–0 | 0–0 | 0–1 | 0–0 | 1–1 | 0–0 | 0–0 | 0–0 | 0–0 | 2–1 | 0–0 | 1–1 | 0–0 | 1 / 4 | 4–4 | 50% |
Grand Slam tournaments
| Australian Open | A | NH | A | A | SF | A | A | SF | SF | A | A | SF | NH | W | A | W | A | 2 / 6 | 9–4 | 69% |
| British Open | Q2 | Q1 | 1R | SF | QF | SF | A | SF | A | SF | W | NH | SF | W | SF | A | | 2 / 10 | 16–8 | 67% |
| French Open | A | A | A | F | NH | A | A | W | QF | W | W | NH | | W | A | A | | 4 / 6 | 12–2 | 86% |
| US Open | A | A | A | A | SF | QF | QF | SF | QF | SF | QF | SF | F | QF | SF | F | F | 0 / 13 | 11–13 | 46% |
| Win–loss | 0–0 | 0–0 | 0–1 | 3–2 | 2–3 | 2–2 | 0–1 | 7–3 | 2–3 | 5–2 | 5–1 | 2–2 | 3–2 | 8–1 | 2–2 | 5–1 | 2–1 | 8 / 35 | 48–27 | 64% |
IRTPA Sanctioned Tournaments
| IRTPA Championship | NH | | | | | | | A | W | QF | NH | | | | | | | 1 / 2 | 1–1 | 50% |
| Win–loss | 0–0 | 0–0 | 0–0 | 0–0 | 0–0 | 0–0 | 0–0 | 0–0 | 1–0 | 0–1 | 0–0 | 0–0 | 0–0 | 0–0 | 0–0 | 0–0 | 0–0 | 1 / 2 | 1–1 | 50% |
Career Statistics
| | 2009 | 2010 | 2011 | 2012 | 2013 | 2014 | 2015 | 2016 | 2017 | 2018 | 2019 | 2020 | 2021 | 2022 | 2023 | 2024 | 2025 | Career | | |
| Tournaments | 0 | 0 | 1 | 2 | 3 | 2 | 2 | 4 | 5 | 4 | 3 | 2 | 2 | 5 | 2 | 3 | 1 | Career total: 41 | | |
| Titles | 0 | 0 | 0 | 0 | 0 | 0 | 0 | 1 | 1 | 1 | 2 | 0 | 0 | 4 | 0 | 1 | 0 | Career total: 10 | | |
| Finals | 0 | 0 | 0 | 1 | 0 | 0 | 0 | 1 | 1 | 1 | 2 | 0 | 1 | 4 | 0 | 3 | 1 | Career total: 15 | | |
| Overall win–loss | 0–0 | 0–0 | 0–1 | 3–2 | 2–3 | 2–2 | 0–2 | 7–3 | 4–4 | 5–3 | 5–1 | 2–2 | 3–2 | 10–2 | 2–2 | 6–2 | 2–1 | 53–32 | | 62% |
| Win % | – | – | 0% | 60% | 40% | 50% | 0% | 70% | 50% | 63% | 83% | 50% | 60% | 83% | 50% | 75% | 67% | Career total: 62% | | |
