= European Open (real tennis) =

Tournament information
- Event name: European Open
- Founded: 1992; 33 years ago
- Abolished: 2015; 10 years ago
- Editions: 13
- Location: London; United Kingdom
- Venue: Lord's Cricket Ground
- Category: IRTPA
- Draw: 8S

Current champions (2015)
- Singles: (Australia) Robert Fahey

The European Open was a real tennis tournament held annually at Lord's Cricket Ground in London, England. It was a ranking point tournament for the purposes of qualifying for the Real Tennis World Championship.

The event was first established in 1992 as a doubles tournament at the Queen's Club in London. In 1995 it was converted as an invitational singles tournament in Bordeaux, with the first edition won by Lauchlan Deuchar. It continued to be hosted on an irregular basis at Fontainebleau and Paris in 1996 and 1998 before moving to the United Kingdom in 2003 at Prested Hall. In 2005, the event became an Open and moved to its permanent venue at the Lord's Cricket Ground. Since the event became an Open, it has only been won by Robert Fahey and Camden Riviere, both of whom would be World Champions during their career. Notable matches included the 2008 final, the first match that Riviere would win against Fahey in their careers across all competitions and the 2013 final, with Riviere overcoming Fahey in 5 sets and three and a half hours. The event has not been held since 2015 due to a lack of sponsorship.

== Past finals ==
=== Singles ===
Year	Venue	Champions	Runners-up	Score
Invitational era
1995	Bordeaux	(Australia) Lachlan Deuchar	(United Kingdom) Mike Gooding	
1996	Fontainebleau	(United Kingdom) Mike Gooding	(United Kingdom) Chris Bray	
1997	Not held			
1998	Paris	(United Kingdom) Nick Wood	(United Kingdom) Chris Bray	
1999–2002	Not held			
2003	Prested Hall	(Australia) Robert Fahey	(United Kingdom) Chris Bray	6/0 6/2 6/1
2004	Not held			
Open era
2005	Lord's	(Australia) Robert Fahey	(United Kingdom) Nick Wood	6/4 6/5 6/2
2006	Lord's	(Australia) Robert Fahey	(Australia) Steve Virgona	6/3 6/3 6/0
2007	Lord's	(Australia) Robert Fahey	(United Kingdom) Ruaraidh Gunn	5/6 6/2 6/1 6/1
2008	Lord's	(United States) Camden Riviere	(Australia) Robert Fahey	6/3 6/2 6/2
2009	Lord's	(Australia) Robert Fahey	(United States) Camden Riviere	6/3 6/3 4/6 1/2
2010	Not held			
2011	Lord's	(Australia) Robert Fahey	(United Kingdom) Bryn Sayers	3/6 6/3 6/0 6/5
2012	Lord's	(United States) Camden Riviere	(United Kingdom) Bryn Sayers	6/1 6/1 6/2
2013	Lord's	(United States) Camden Riviere	(Australia) Robert Fahey	6/4 5/6 3/6 6/2 6/3
2014	Not held			
2015	Lord's	(Australia) Robert Fahey	(Australia) Chris Chapman	6/0 6/5 6/3

=== Doubles ===
Year	Venue	Champions	Runners-up	Score
1993	Queen's Club	(Australia) Lachlan Deuchar / (Australia) Wayne Davies	(United Kingdom) Julian Snow / (United Kingdom) Nick Wood	5/6 6/1 6/4 5/6 6/4
1995 (March)	Queen's Club	(Australia) Lachlan Deuchar / (Australia) Wayne Davies	(United States) Mark Devine / (United Kingdom) Kevin Sheldon	6/3 6/5 6/2
1995 (September)	Queen's Club	(Australia) Lachlan Deuchar / (Australia) Jonathan Howell	(United States) Mark Devine / (United Kingdom) Kevin Sheldon	6/5 6/3 1/6 6/5
1996	Queen's Club	(United Kingdom) Julian Snow / (United Kingdom) James Male	(United Kingdom) Chris Bray / (United Kingdom) Mike Gooding	6/2 3/6 3/6 6/3 6/2
