= 2024 French Open (real tennis) =

2024 Open de France du Jeu de Paume
- Date: 22-29 September
- Edition: 42nd
- Category: IRTPA (men); None (women)
- Draw: 16S / 8D (men); 6S / 3D (women)
- Location: Paris, France
- Venue: Société Sportive du Jeu de Paume & de Racquets

Champions

Men's singles
- (United States) Camden Riviere

Women's singles
- (United Kingdom) Claire Fahey

Men's doubles
- (United States) Camden Riviere / (Australia) Nick Howell

Women's doubles
- (United Kingdom) Claire Fahey / (Netherlands) Saskia Bollerman
← 2023 ·	Open de France du Jeu de Paume	· 2025 →

The 2024 French Open also known as the 2024 Open de France du Jeu de Paume was the 42nd edition of the real tennis French Open. The event was held at the Société Sportive du Jeu de Paume & de Racquets in Paris between September 22 and 29, 2024, and was organised by the Comité Français de Courte-Paume, forming part of the qualifying series for the 2025 Real Tennis World Championship. The men's draw was the third grand slam event of the year. It was the first French Open to be played without the pass rule.

2023 champion Nick Howell returned to defend his title, but he lost in the final to World Champion Camden Riviere. Riviere and Howell won the doubles against Steve Virgona and Leon Smart. Defending champion Claire Fahey won the women's singles event, winning her seventh calendar year grand slam. Fahey and Saskia Bollerman won the doubles, their first win at the event as a pair since 2017.

The event featured the debuts of Henry Henman and Vaughan Hamilton in an Open main draws, as well as the debut of Bertie Vallat at the French Open.

== Points Allocation ==
Points were available for the IRTPA World Rankings and the IRTPA World Race, the latter forming the qualifying path for the 2025 Real Tennis World Championships. Ranking points are only available for the men's draws. The points available are shown in the table below.

Draw	Winner	Runner up	Semi Final	Quarter Final	First Round
Men's Singles	6612	4408	2645	1322	440
Men's Doubles	1580	1053	632	316	-

== Draw and results ==
Amateur players are marked as (A)

=== Men's Singles Qualifying ===
Top 2 players qualify for the main draw

	(France) Hurstel	(France) Jacquin-Turrettini	(France) Huynh-Lenhardt	W-L	Set W-L	Game W-L	Standings
(France) CA Hurstel (A)		3/6 5/6	6/4 5/6 5/6	0–2	1–4 (0%)	24–28 (46%)	3
(France) B Jacquin-Turrettini (A)	6/3 6/5		6/1 3/6 6/4	2–0	4–1 (100%)	27–19 (59%)	1
(France) B Huynh-Lenhardt	4/6 6/5 6/5	1/6 6/3 4/6		1–1	3–3 (67%)	27–31 (47%)	2

=== Men's Singles ===
First round
1	(United States) C Riviere	6	6	6
Q	(France) B Huynh-Lenhardt (A)	1	1	0
6	(France) M Sarlangue (A)	6	6	6
Q	(France) B Jacquin-Turrettini (A)	2	0	4
7	(United Kingdom) L Williams	6	4	3	6	6
(United Kingdom) H Henman (A)	1	6	6	4	5
(United Kingdom) L Gordon	2	1	1
4	(United Kingdom) L Smart	6	6	6
3	(Australia) S Virgona	6	6	6
(United Kingdom) B Vallat (A)	2	5	3
5	(United Kingdom) R Shenkman (A)	6	6	6
(Australia) J Woods-Casey	5	4	2
8	(United Kingdom) L Gale	6	6	6
(United Kingdom) V Hamilton	2	3	3
(France) N Victoir (A)	3	0	1
2	(Australia) N Howell	6	6	6

Quarter-finals
1	(United States) C Riviere	6	6	6
6	(France) M Sarlangue (A)	0	0	3
7	(United Kingdom) L Williams	2	6	5	3
4	(United Kingdom) L Smart	6	3	6	6
3	(Australia) S Virgona	2	6	6	6
5	(United Kingdom) R Shenkman	6	1	5	2
8	(United Kingdom) L Gale	6	3	6	3	1
2	(Australia) N Howell	3	6	3	6	6

Semi-finals
1	(United States) C Riviere	6	6	6
4	(United Kingdom) L Smart	0	3	2
3	(Australia) S Virgona	2	6	1	6	4
2	(Australia) N Howell	6	4	6	3	6

Final
1	(United States) C Riviere	6	6	6
2	(Australia) N Howell	0	1	3

=== Men's Doubles ===
Quarterfinals				Semifinals					Finals
				1	(United States) C Riviere (Australia) N Howell	6	6	6
(United Kingdom) R Shenkman (A) (United Kingdom) L Gordon	6	6	6		(United Kingdom) R Shenkman (A) (United Kingdom) L Gordon	2	4	4
(France) N Victoir (A) (United Kingdom) B Vallat (A)	0	3	1						1	(United States) C Riviere (Australia) N Howell	6	6	6
(Australia) J Woods-Casey (United Kingdom) V Hamilton	6	6	6						2	(Australia) S Virgona (United Kingdom) L Smart	2	1	1
(United Kingdom) L Gale (United Kingdom) L Williams	4	5	4		(Australia) J Woods-Casey (United Kingdom) V Hamilton	2	0	4
				2	' (Australia) S Virgona (United Kingdom) L Smart	6	6	6

=== Women's Singles ===
Note: all players are amateurs except Claire Fahey

Quarterfinals			Semifinals				Finals
			1	(United Kingdom) C Fahey	6	6
(Netherlands) S Bollerman	6	6		(Netherlands) S Bollerman	2	1
(United Kingdom) J Garside	4	1					1	(United Kingdom) C Fahey	6	6
(United Kingdom) K Carney	6	6					2	(France) L van der Zwalmen	1	2
(United Kingdom) G Ingham	0	4		(United Kingdom) K Carney	0	0
			2	(France) L van der Zwalmen	6	6

=== Women's Doubles ===
Note: all players are amateurs except Claire Fahey

Semifinal			Final
			1	(United Kingdom) C Fahey (Netherlands) S Bollerman	3	6	6
(United Kingdom) K Carney (United Kingdom) G Ingham	0	0	2	(France) L van der Zwalmen (United Kingdom) J Garside	6	1	2
(France) L van der Zwalmen (United Kingdom) J Garside	6	6

== Seeds and Rankings ==
World Rankings are taken from the IRTPA. World Race points are taken from the IRTPA World Race and form the qualification pathway to the 2025 Real Tennis World Championship. World Rankings are taken from the IRTPA World Rankings for the top 25 ranked players. Subsequent rankings are taken from the RealTennisOnline rankings. Where a player is ranked by handicap, their handicap is shown in brackets. For doubles pairs, seeding is taken as the numeric sum of the ranking points for each player. Subsequent rankings are taken from the pair's doubles handicaps using the IRTPA doubles handicap calculator. Rankings correct at 2 October 2024.

=== Men's Singles ===
Seed	Rank	Player	Ranking Points before	Race Points before	Points won	Points after	Race Points after	Status
1	1	(United States) Camden Riviere	105269	72142	6612	103987	78755	Champion, defeated (Australia) Nick Howell (2)
2	3	(Australia) Nick Howell	51706	40371	4408	52660	44779	Runner-up, lost to (United States) Camden Riviere (1)
3	6	(Australia) Steve Virgona	29699	31467	2645	32344	34112	Semi Final lost to (Australia) Nick Howell (2)
4	8	(United Kingdom) Leon Smart	20634	18500	2645	23279	21145	Semi Final lost to (United States) Camden Riviere (1)
5	10	(United Kingdom) Robert Shenkman	12249	13022	1322	13572	14345	Quarter final lost to (Australia) Steve Virgona (3)
6	11	(France) Matthieu Sarlangue	10051	9941	1322	11374	11264	Quarter Final lost to (United States) Camden Riviere (1)
7	12	(United Kingdom) Lewis Williams	9222	9211	1322	10200	10534	Quarter Final lost to (United Kingdom) Leon Smart (4)
8	15	(United Kingdom) Levi Gale	5452	3796	1322	6450	5119	Quarter Final lost to (Australia) Nick Howell (2)
-	19	(Australia) John Woods-Casey	2894	1926	440	3010	2367	First round lost to (United Kingdom) Robert Shenkman (5)
-	30	(United Kingdom) Louis Gordon	1495	-	440	1936	-	First round lost to (United Kingdom) Leon Smart (4)
-	34	(United Kingdom) Vaughan Hamilton	921	921	440	1361	1361	First round lost to (United Kingdom) Levi Gale (8)
-	56	(United Kingdom) Bertie Vallat	790	790	440	1230	1230	First round lost to (Australia) Steve Virgona (3)
-	73	(United Kingdom) Henry Henman	0	0	440	440	440	First round lost to (United Kingdom) Lewis Williams (7)
-	77	(France) Nicolas Victoir	531	531	440	-	971	First round lost to (Australia) Nick Howell (2)
-	121	(France) Benjamin Jacquin-Turrettini	0	0	440	440	440	First round lost to (France) Matthieu Sarlangue (6)
-	129	(France) Baudoin Huynh-Lenhardt	0	0	440	440	440	First round lost to (United States) Camden Riviere (1)

=== Men's Doubles ===
Seed	Rank	Player	Points Before	Points After	Rank	Player	Points Before	Points After	Status
1	1	(United States) Camden Riviere	94428	92564	3	(Australia) Nick Howell	51824	55882	Champion, defeated (Australia) Steve Virgona and (United Kingdom) Leon Smart
2	7	(Australia) Steve Virgona	37042	40107	10	(United Kingdom) Leon Smart	18454	20713	Runner-up, lost to (United States) Camden Riviere and (Australia) Nick Howell
-	11	(United Kingdom) Robert Shenkman	12066	13534	24	(United Kingdom) Louis Gordon	3268	4278	Semi Final lost to (United States) Camden Riviere and (Australia) Nick Howell
-	13	(United Kingdom) Lewis Williams	8662	9425	16	(United Kingdom) Levi Gale	6281	6961	Quarter Final lost to (Australia) John Woods-Casey and (United Kingdom) Vaughan Hamilton
-	19	(Australia) John Woods-Casey	5302	6150	56	(United Kingdom) Vaughan Hamilton	(9.1)	(8.6)	Semi Final lost to (Australia) Steve Virgona and (United Kingdom) Leon Smart
-	51	(France) Nicolas Victoir	(8.8)	(10.3)	102	(United Kingdom) Bertie Vallat	(13.3)	(10.4)	Quarter Final lost to (United Kingdom) Robert Shenkman and (United Kingdom) Louis Gordon

== See also ==
- Grand Slam (real tennis)
