= 2021 US Open (court tennis) =

- Date: 21-28 October
- Edition: 71st
- Category: None
- Draw: 15S / 8D
- Location: Philadelphia, Pennsylvania
- Venue: Racquet Club of Philadelphia

Champions

Men's singles
- (United States) Camden Riviere

Men's doubles
- (United States) Camden Riviere / (United States) Tim Chisholm
- US Open (court tennis)

The 2021 Court Tennis US Open was the 71st edition of the US Open. The event was held at the Racquet Club of Philadelphia between October 21-28, 2022 and was organised by the United States Court Tennis Association, delayed from its usual March timeslot due to the COVID-19 pandemic. Due to travel restrictions, the event was only open to players resident in the United States, so was not part of the qualification for the 2023 Real Tennis World Championship. There was no women's event organised. It was the first of two grand slam events of the year, with no Australian or French Opens being scheduled.

The men's singles draw was won by incumbent World Champion Camden Riviere for the 9th consecutive time. Riviere also won the men's doubles draw alongside Tim Chisholm, their 10th US Open title as a pairing. The edition would be Mike Gooding's final tournament appearance at the US Open before his passing the following year.

== Draw and results ==
Amateur players are marked as (A)

=== Men's Singles ===
First round
(United Kingdom) M Gooding	5	6	3	5
(United Kingdom) A Kemp	6	4	6	6
7	(United States) T Hollins	6	6	6
(United States) J Asher (A)	2	5	0
(United States) B Tanfield	6	6	2	6
4	(United States) T Chisholm	5	2	6	4
3	(Australia) S Virgona	6	6	6
(United States) R Whitehouse	2	0	0
(Bermuda) J Stout	6	6	6
6	(United Kingdom) J Dodgson	4	2	2
5	(United Kingdom) L Smart	6	6	6
(United States) J Crowell (A)	0	3	1
(United States) F Bristowe (A)	1	2	2
2	(United Kingdom) J Lumley	6	6	6

Second round
1	(United States) C Riviere	6	6	6
(United Kingdom) A Kemp	0	1	1
7	(United Kingdom) T Hollins	6	6	2	5	4
(United States) B Tanfield	4	2	6	6	6
3	(Australia) S Virgona	6	6	6
(Bermuda) J Stout	3	2	5
5	(United Kingdom) L Smart	0	5	0
2	(United Kingdom) J Lumley	6	6	6

Semifinals
1	(United States) C Riviere	6	6	6
(United States) B Tanfield	1	0	1
3	(Australia) S Virgona	1	0
2	(United Kingdom) J Lumley	6	6

Finals
1	(United States) C Riviere	6	6	6
2	(United Kingdom) J Lumley	3	3	2

=== Men's Doubles ===
Quarterfinals
1	(United States) C Riviere (United States) T Chisholm	6
(United States) J Asher (A) (United States) A Cohen (A)	0
(United States) R Whitehouse (United Kingdom) M Gooding	2
3	(Bermuda) J Stout (United States) B Tanfield	6
4	(United Kingdom) J Dodgson (United Kingdom) L Smart	6
(United States) J Crowell (A) (United States) F Bristowe (A)	2
(United Kingdom) A Kemp (United Kingdom) T Hollings	0
2	(United Kingdom) J Lumley (United Kingdom) S Virgona	6

Semifinals
1	(United States) C Riviere (United States) T Chisholm	6
3	(Bermuda) J Stout (United States) B Tanfield	2
4	(United Kingdom) J Dodgson (United Kingdom) L Smart	1
2	(United Kingdom) J Lumley (United Kingdom) S Virgona	6

Finals
1	(United States) C Riviere (United States) T Chisholm	6
2	(United Kingdom) J Lumley (United Kingdom) S Virgona	4

== See also ==
- Grand Slam (real tennis)
