= US Open (court tennis) =

Tournament information
- Event name: US Open
- Founded: 1919; 107 years ago
- Editions: 75 (2025)
- Location: Variable; United States
- Venue: Variable
- Category: IRTPA (men); None (women)
- Draw: 16S / 8D (men); Variable (women)

Current champions (2025)
- Men's singles: (United Kingdom) John Lumley
- Women's singles: (United Kingdom) Claire Fahey
- Men's doubles: (United States) Camden Riviere / (United States) Tim Chisholm
- Women's doubles: (France) Lea Van Der Zwalmen / (United States) Annie Clark

The US Open is an annual court tennis (also known as real tennis) tournament run by the United States Court Tennis Association. The event is open to top professional and amateur players from around the world. The location rotates each year between the Tennis and Racquet Club in Boston, the Tuxedo Club in Tuxedo, New York, the Racquet Club of Chicago, the Racquet Club of Philadelphia, and Westwood Country Club. The event has also previously been held at the Racquet and Tennis Club in New York, but it was removed from the rotation due to its male-only policy. The women's rotation excludes Chicago but also includes Prince's Court in Virginia and the International Tennis Hall of Fame in Rhode Island. The men's event carrys ranking points and forms part of the qualification pathway for the Real Tennis World Championship. The women's event does not carry any ranking points.

== History ==
=== Early years ===
The Open championship was first conceived as a challenge between the top amateur and top professional players in the country. The tournament was first contested in 1919 between the US Amateur Champion and former World Champion Jay Gould II and World Squash Champion and professional Walter Kinsella in a best of thirteen set challenge over three days at the Racquet Club of Philadelphia. Gould won all four sets on the opening day in a display reminiscent of his World Championship against Fred Covey. However Kinsella rallied on the second day, winning the sixth through eighth sets. Gould won two of three sets on the final day to become the first Open champion.

The title would next be contested in 1921, with a play-off tournament to earn the right to challenge Gould for the championship. In the final of the bracket, Jock Soutar beat Cecil Fairs on his home court of Philadelphia three sets to two. In the challenge against Gould, played as a best of 9 set match, Gould was dominant, winning five sets to one, making just eight unforced errors on the second day. At the conclusion of the match, Kinsella lodged a challenge for a further defense of the title, but it was refused as he did not participate in the earlier play-off.

The Open would not again be contested during Gould's career. The title would next be contested in 1934 in New York with an open field with three amateurs and ten professionals participating. Kinsella won the final in straight sets over Jack White in straight sets. Kinsenlla had barely played in the lead up to the tournament, his last competition being his challenge to Soutar for the 1927 US Professional title.

The next contest for the championship would be in 1951 in Boston. It was won by Alistair Martin over Philadelphia professional James Dunn in four sets of a best of five match.

=== Open era ===
Following the establishment of the United States Court Tennis Association in 1955, the Open championship would be contested annually. The first four editions were won by New York professional Jack Johnson, defeating a field of amateurs that included future World Champion Northrup Knox. A doubles draw was first contested in 1959. The 1960s saw the dominance of brothers Jimmy and George Bostwick, winning ten singles titles between them and three doubles titles as a pair. In the mid-1970s, the brothers gave way to Eugene Scott, who won five consecutive championships between 1973 and 1977.

The event would enter the modern era in the early 1980s following the movement of the British Open and Australian Open to annual events, and with the establishment of the French Open. The event transitioned from an annual meeting of the top US based professionals and amateurs to one stop on a global calendar featuring the top players from around the world. James Burke would be the last American to win the event for 25 years in 1978, while Barry Toates was the first Australian victor in 1979. Notably, Chris Ronaldson became the first player to win a calendar year grand slam in 1980 by winning the national Open in all four countries. Throughout the 1980s and 1990s, the dominant player was the Australian professional at New York, Wayne Davies, who won the event 9 times. In 1984, the US Ladies Open was held for the first time, albeit at a different date and venue to the Men's Open. It would regularly attract the top female players from Great Britain, with no American having won the title since 1999.

Despite having earlier won the US Open in 1993, it wouldn't be until the 2000s when long-standing World Champion Robert Fahey would make his mark on the championship, winning it seven times between 2000 and 2008. His only defeats came to American Tim Chisholm in 2003 and 2004. In 2009 Camden Riviere became the second American to win the title since 1978, shortly after his challenge for the 2008 Real Tennis World Championship. Riviere would then claim 12 consecutive titles between 2013 and 2024 to become the most prolific winner in the history of the event. Riviere and Chisholm would combine for 12 consecutive doubles titles over the same period. Over a similar time period, Claire Fahey dominated the women's draw, winning 11 titles between 2008 and 2025 without a match defeat.

== Past finals ==
=== Men's singles ===
Year	Champions	Runners-up	Score
Challenge era
1919	(United States) Jay Gould II		
1921	(United States) Jay Gould II		
1951	(United States) Alistair Martin		
Open era
1956	(United States) A. B. Johnson		
1957	(United States) A. B. Johnson		
1958	(United States) A. B. Johnson		
1959	(United States) A. B. Johnson		
1960	(United States) James Bostwick		
1961	(United States) James Bostwick		
1962	(United States) James Bostwick		
1963	(United States) A. B. Johnson		
1964	(United States) R. Hughes		
1965	(United States) A. B. Johnson		
1966	(United States) Pete Bostwick		
1967	(United States) James Bostwick		
1968	(United States) Pete Bostwick		
1969	(United States) James Bostwick		
1970	(United States) James Bostwick		
1971	(United States) Pete Bostwick		
1972	(United States) James Bostwick		
1973	(United States) Eugene Scott		
1974	(United States) Eugene Scott		
1975	(United States) Eugene Scott		
1976	(United States) Eugene Scott		
1977	(United States) Eugene Scott		
1978	(United States) James Burke		
1979	(Australia) Barry Toates		
1980	(United Kingdom) Chris Ronaldson		
1981	(Australia) Graham Hyland		
1982	(Australia) Wayne Davies		
1983	(Australia) Wayne Davies		
1984	(United Kingdom) Chris Ronaldson		
1985	(Australia) Wayne Davies		
1986	(United Kingdom) Chris Ronaldson		
1987	(Australia) Graham Hyland		
1988	(Australia) Wayne Davies		
1989	(Australia) Wayne Davies		
1990	(Australia) Wayne Davies		
1991	(Australia) Lachlan Deuchar		
1992	(Australia) Lachlan Deuchar		
1993	(Australia) Robert Fahey		
1994	(Australia) Wayne Davies		
1995	(Australia) Wayne Davies		
1996	(United Kingdom) Julian Snow	(Australia) Wayne Davies	6/3 4/6 6/4 6/4
1997	(United Kingdom) Julian Snow	(Australia) Lachlan Deuchar	6/1 6/3 6/1
1998	(Australia) Chris Bray	(United Kingdom) Julian Snow	3/6 6/4 6/4 6/5
1999	(Australia) Wayne Davies		
2000	(Australia) Robert Fahey		
2001	(Australia) Robert Fahey		
2002	(Australia) Robert Fahey		
2003	(United States) Tim Chisholm	(United Kingdom) Chris Bray	6/4 5/6 6/4 6/0
2004	(United States) Tim Chisholm	(United Kingdom) Ruaraidh Gunn	6/1 6/0 6/1
2005	(Australia) Robert Fahey	(United States) Tim Chisholm	6/4 6/2 6/2
2006	(Australia) Robert Fahey	(Australia) Steve Virgona	6/2 6/3 6/3
2007	(Australia) Robert Fahey	(Australia) Steve Virgona	6/2 6/3 1/6 6/1
2008	(Australia) Robert Fahey	(Australia) Steve Virgona	6/0 6/5 6/3
2009	(United States) Camden Riviere	(Australia) Steve Virgona	6/2 6/5 6/1
2010	(Bermuda) James Stout	(United Kingdom) Bryn Sayers	6/2 6/2 3/6 6/2
2011	(Australia) Steve Virgona	(United States) Camden Riviere	6/2 6/4 6/3
2012	(United Kingdom) Bryn Sayers	(Australia) Steve Virgona	0/6 6/5 4/6 6/3 6/1
2013	(United States) Camden Riviere	(Australia) Steve Virgona	6/2 6/4 6/1
2014	(United States) Camden Riviere	(Bermuda) James Stout	6/1 6/0 6/0
2015	(United States) Camden Riviere	(Australia) Robert Fahey	6/0 6/1 4/6 6/3
2016	(United States) Camden Riviere	(Australia) Steve Virgona	6/2 6/4 6/1
2017	(United States) Camden Riviere	(Australia) Robert Fahey	6/4 6/4 6/3
2018	(United States) Camden Riviere	(Australia) Robert Fahey	6/3 6/2 6/0
2019	(United States) Camden Riviere	(Australia) Robert Fahey	6/3 6/3 6/3
2020	(United States) Camden Riviere	(Australia) Nick Howell	6/1 6/1 6/1
2021	(United States) Camden Riviere	(United Kingdom) John Lumley	6/3 6/3 6/2
2022	(United States) Camden Riviere	(Australia) Robert Fahey	6/2 6/3 6/5
2023	(United States) Camden Riviere	(United Kingdom) John Lumley	6/1 6/2 1/6 6/2
2024	(United States) Camden Riviere	(United Kingdom) John Lumley	6/0 4/6 3/6 6/2 6/2
2025	(United Kingdom) John Lumley	(United States) Camden Riviere	4/6 3/6 6/5 6/1 6/4

=== Women's singles ===
Year	Champions	Runners-up	Score
1984	(United Kingdom) Lesley Ronaldson		
1985	(United States) Elizabeth Woodthorpe		
1986	(United Kingdom) Sally Jones		
1987	(Australia) Jane Hyland		
1988	(United States) Jane Lippincott		
1989	(United Kingdom) Sally Jones		
1990	(United States) Alice Bartlett		
1991	(United Kingdom) Charlotte Cornwallis		
1992	(United States) Lissen Tutrone		
1993	(United States) Helen Mursell		
1994	(United States) Jane Lippincott		
1995	(United Kingdom) Katrina Allen		
1996	(United Kingdom) Sue Haswell		
1997	(United Kingdom) Penny Lumley		
1998	(United Kingdom) Penny Lumley	(United Kingdom) Fiona Deuchar	6/0 6/0
1999	(United States) Jane Lippincott		
2000	(United Kingdom) Penny Lumley		
2001	(United Kingdom) Penny Lumley		
2002	(United Kingdom) Penny Lumley		
2003	(United Kingdom) Penny Lumley		
2004	(United Kingdom) Charlotte Cornwallis	(United Kingdom) Penny Lumley	6/5 6/3
2005	(United Kingdom) Charlotte Cornwallis	(United States) Frederika Adam	6/5 6/1
2006	(United Kingdom) Charlotte Cornwallis	(United Kingdom) Sue Haswell	6/1 6/0
2007	(United Kingdom) Charlotte Cornwallis	(United Kingdom) Karen Hird	6/1 6/2
2008	(United Kingdom) Claire Fahey	(United Kingdom) Sue Haswell	6/2 6/1
2009	(United Kingdom) Charlotte Cornwallis	(United States) Frederika Adam	6/1 6/3
2010	(United Kingdom) Claire Fahey	(United States) Frederika Adam	6/0 6/2
2011	(United Kingdom) Claire Fahey	(United States) Aldona Greenwood	6/0 6/2
2012	(United Kingdom) Claire Fahey	(United Kingdom) Karen Hird	6/3 6/3
2013	(United Kingdom) Tara Lumley	(United Kingdom) Karen Hird	4/6 6/4 6/0
2014	(United Kingdom) Claire Fahey	(United States) Amanda Avedissian	6/1 6/0
2015	(United Kingdom) Penny Lumley	(United Kingdom) Tara Lumley	6/0 6/4
2016	(Latvia) Irina Dulbish	(United States) Amanda Avedissian	5/6 6/0 6/0
2017	(United Kingdom) Claire Fahey	(United Kingdom) Tara Lumley	6/0 6/1
2018	(Netherlands) Saskia Bollerman	(United Kingdom) Tara Lumley	6/5 6/1
2019	(United Kingdom) Claire Fahey	(United Kingdom) Tara Lumley	6/2 6/2
2020-2021	Not held		
2022	(United Kingdom) Claire Fahey	(United States) Frederika Adam	6/0 6/1
2023	(United Kingdom) Claire Fahey	(France) Lea Van Der Zwalmen	6/3 6/3
2024	(United Kingdom) Claire Fahey	(Australia) Jo See Tan	6/0 6/0
2025	(United Kingdom) Claire Fahey	(France) Lea Van Der Zwalmen	6/4 6/0

=== Men's doubles ===
Year	Champions	Runners-up	Score
1959	(United States) Alastair Martin / (United States) Robert Grant III		
1960	(United States) James Dunn / (United States) W. I. Forbes Jnr.		
1961	(United States) James Dunn / (United States) W. I. Forbes Jnr.		
1962	(United States) James Dunn / (United States) W. I. Forbes Jnr.		
1963	(United States) Alastair Martin / (United States) Northrup Knox		
1964	(United States) James Dunn / (United States) William Vogt		
1965	(United States) James Dunn / (United States) William Vogt		
1966	(United States) James Dunn / (United States) William Vogt		
1967	(United States) James Dunn / (United States) William Vogt		
1968	(United States) G. H.. Bostwick Jr. / (United States) J. F. C. Bostwick		
1969	(United States) G. H.. Bostwick Jr. / (United States) J. F. C. Bostwick		
1970	(United States) G. H.. Bostwick Jr. / (United States) J. F. C. Bostwick		
1971	(United States) Alastair Martin / (United States) Eugene Scott		
1972	(United States) Samuel Howe / (United States) Edward Noll		
1973	(United States) Jerry Bijur / (United States) Luis Dominguez		
1974	(United States) Eugene Scott / (United States) Samuel Howe		
1976	(United States) J. F. Sammis III / (United States) Roger Tuckerman		
1977	(United States) Norwood Cripps / (United Kingdom) Chris Ronaldson		
1978	(United States) Eugene Scott / (United States) Ogden Phipps		
1979	(United States) Eugene Scott / (Australia) Barry Toates		
1980	(Australia) Graham Hyland / (United States) Ogden Phipps		
1981	(Australia) Graham Hyland / (United States) Ogden Phipps		
1982	(United States) Ogden Phipps / (Australia) Wayne Davies		
1983	(Australia) Barry Toates / (United States) Frank Faulderbaum		
1984	(Australia) Lachlan Deuchar / (United Kingdom) Kevin Sheldon		
1985	(United States) James Burke / (United States) Peter Clement		
1986	(Australia) Wayne Davies / (United States) Peter DeSvastich		
1987	(Australia) Graham Hyland / (United States) David Collins		
1988	(Australia) Wayne Davies / (United States) Peter DeSvastich		
1989	(Australia) Lachlan Deuchar / (United States) Peter DeSvastich		
1990	(Australia) Robert Fahey / (Australia) Peter Meares		
1991	(Australia) Wayne Davies / (Australia) Lachlan Deuchar		
1992	(United Kingdom) Julian Snow / (Australia) Robert Fahey		
1993	(United Kingdom) Julian Snow / (Australia) Robert Fahey		
1994	(United Kingdom) Chris Bray / (United Kingdom) Mike Gooding		
1995	(United Kingdom) Chris Bray / (United Kingdom) Mike Gooding		
1996	(United Kingdom) Julian Snow / (United Kingdom) Nick Wood	(United Kingdom) Chris Bray / (United Kingdom) Mike Gooding	6/4 4/6 6/3 6/2
1997	(United Kingdom) Julian Snow / (United Kingdom) James Male	(United Kingdom) Mike Gooding / (Australia) Lachlan Deuchar	6/2 1/6 6/2 6/4
1998	(United Kingdom) Ruaraidh Gunn / (Australia) Steve Virgona	(United Kingdom) Andrew Lyons / (United States) Will Simonds	6/1 6/1 6/1
1999	(United Kingdom) Julian Snow / (United Kingdom) James Male		
2000	(United Kingdom) Julian Snow / (United Kingdom) Nick Wood		
2001	(United Kingdom) Chris Bray / (United Kingdom) Nick Wood		
2002	(United Kingdom) Mike Gooding / (United Kingdom) Nick Wood		
2003	(United Kingdom) Mike Gooding / (United Kingdom) Nick Wood		
2004	(United States) Tim Chisholm / (United States) Morris Clothier		
2005	(Australia) Robert Fahey / (United Kingdom) Ruaraidh Gunn		
2006	(United States) Tim Chisholm / (United States) Camden Riviere		
2007	(Australia) Robert Fahey / (Australia) Steve Virgona	(United Kingdom) Mike Gooding / (United Kingdom) Nick Wood	2/6 6/3 6/5 6/0
2008	(Australia) Robert Fahey / (Australia) Steve Virgona	(United Kingdom) Ruaraidh Gunn / (United States) Camden Riviere	6/2 6/3 6/3
2009	(United States) Camden Riviere / (United Kingdom) Nick Wood	(Australia) Robert Fahey / (Australia) Steve Virgona	6/5 5/6 6/2 6/2
2010	(Australia) Steve Virgona / (United Kingdom) Ben Taylor-Matthews	(United States) Tim Chisholm / (United States) Camden Riviere	6/5 6/5 6/1
2011	(Australia) Steve Virgona / (Australia) Robert Fahey	(United States) Tim Chisholm / (United States) Camden Riviere	6/1 6/2 6/1
2012	(Australia) Steve Virgona / (United States) Tim Chisholm	(United Kingdom) Bryn Sayers / (Australia) Kieran Booth	2/6 6/4 6/3 6/1
2013	(United States) Camden Riviere / (United States) Tim Chisholm	(United Kingdom) Bryn Sayers / (Australia) Steve Virgona	6/2 6/5 6/1
2014	(United States) Camden Riviere / (United States) Tim Chisholm	(Bermuda) James Stout / (United Kingdom) Mike Gooding	6/2 6/4 4/6 6/1
2015	(United States) Camden Riviere / (United States) Tim Chisholm	(Australia) Steve Virgona / (Australia) Kieran Booth	6/2 6/2 6/3
2016	(United States) Camden Riviere / (United States) Tim Chisholm	(Australia) Steve Virgona / (Australia) Chris Chapman	6/4 6/5 6/0
2017	(United States) Camden Riviere / (United States) Tim Chisholm	(Australia) Steve Virgona / (Australia) Chris Chapman	6/3 6/0 6/3
2018	(United States) Camden Riviere / (United States) Tim Chisholm	(Australia) Robert Fahey / (Australia) Nick Howell	6/2 6/0 1/6 6/1
2019	(United States) Camden Riviere / (United States) Tim Chisholm	(Australia) Robert Fahey / (Australia) Nick Howell	6/5 6/4 6/4
2020	(United States) Camden Riviere / (United States) Tim Chisholm	(Australia) Steve Virgona / (United Kingdom) Ben Taylor-Matthews	6/5 6/5 5/6 6/4
2021	(United States) Camden Riviere / (United States) Tim Chisholm	(Australia) Steve Virgona / (United Kingdom) Ben Taylor-Matthews	6/5 6/5 5/6 6/4
2022	(United States) Camden Riviere / (United States) Tim Chisholm	(Australia) Robert Fahey / (Australia) Nick Howell	6/1 6/4 6/2
2023	(United States) Camden Riviere / (United States) Tim Chisholm	(United Kingdom) Ben Taylor-Matthews / (Australia) Nick Howell	6/1 5/6 6/0 6/2
2024	(United States) Camden Riviere / (United States) Tim Chisholm	(United Kingdom) John Lumley / (Australia) Steve Virgona	6/1 5/6 6/2 5/6 6/4
2025	(United States) Camden Riviere / (United States) Tim Chisholm	(United Kingdom) John Lumley / (Australia) Steve Virgona	6/1 5/6 6/4 6/2

=== Women's doubles ===
Year	Champions	Runners-up	Score
1984	(United Kingdom) Lesley Ronaldson / (United States) Maggie Wright		
1985	(United States) Julie Talbert / (United States) Elizabeth Woodthorpe		
1986	(United Kingdom) Sally Jones / (United States) Hellen Mursell		
1987	(Australia) Jane Hyland / (United States) Hellen Mursell		
1988	(United States) Jane Lippincott / (United States) Hellen Mursell		
1989	(United Kingdom) Sally Jones / (United Kingdom) Alex Garside		
1990	(United States) Jane Lippincott / (United Kingdom) Sheila Reilly		
1991	(United States) Catherine Castle / (United States) Lissen Thompson		
1992	(United States) Jane Lippincott / (United Kingdom) Sheila Reilly		
1993	(United States) Jane Lippincott / (United States) Helen Mursell		
1994	(United Kingdom) Sheila Reilly / (United States) Eleanor Douglas		
1995	(United Kingdom) Katrina Allen / (Australia) Karen Toates		
1996	(United Kingdom) Sue Haswell / (United Kingdom) Sheila Reilly		
1997	(United Kingdom) Penny Lumley / (United States) Evelyn David		
1998	(United Kingdom) Penny Lumley / (United Kingdom) Fiona Deuchar	(United States) Jane Lippincott / (United States) Brenda Sabbag	6/0 6/3
1998	(United States) Jane Lippincott / (United States) Brenda Sabbag		
2000	(United Kingdom) Penny Lumley / (United States) Evelyn David		
2001	(United Kingdom) Penny Lumley / (United Kingdom) Jo Iddles		
2002	(United Kingdom) Penny Lumley / (United States) Evelyn David		
2003	(United Kingdom) Penny Lumley / (United States) Evelyn David		
2004	(United Kingdom) Charlotte Cornwallis / (United Kingdom) Alex Garside		
2005	(United Kingdom) Charlotte Cornwallis / (United States) Melissa Grassi		
2006	(United Kingdom) Charlotte Cornwallis / (United Kingdom) Sue Haswell		
2007	(United Kingdom) Charlotte Cornwallis / (United States) Karen Hird		
2008	(United Kingdom) Sue Haswell / (United States) Ginny Goodyear		
2009	(United Kingdom) Charlotte Cornwallis / (United Kingdom) Karen Hird	Unknown / (United States) Aldona Greenwood	6/1 6/0
2010	(United Kingdom) Claire Fahey / (United States) Frederika Adam	(United Kingdom) Sheila Reilly / (United States) Emily Boenning	6/1 6/0
2011	(United Kingdom) Claire Fahey / (United States) Aldona Greenwood	(United States) Melissa Purcell / (United States) Kathy Carson	6/0 6/0
2012	(United Kingdom) Claire Fahey / (United States) Amanda Avedissian	(United Kingdom) Karen Hird / (United States) Frederika Adam	6/3 6/1
2013	(United Kingdom) Karen Hird / (United States) Frederika Adam	(United Kingdom) Tara Lumley / (United States) Anne Gwathmey	6/2 6/1
2014	(United Kingdom) Claire Fahey / (United States) Amanda Avedissian	(United States) Melissa Purcell / (United States) Kathy Carson	6/0 6/0
2015	(United Kingdom) Penny Lumley / (United Kingdom) Tara Lumley		
2016	(United States) Frederika Adam / (Latvia) Irina Dulbish	(United States) Amanda Avedissian / (United States) Brenda Sabbag	6/0 5/6 6/1
2017	(United Kingdom) Claire Fahey / (United States) Kim Kilgore	(United Kingdom) Penny Lumley / (United Kingdom) Tara Lumley	1/6 6/3 6/3
2018	(United Kingdom) Tara Lumley / (Netherlands) Saskia Bollerman	(Australia) Xanthe Ranger / (United Kingdom) Isabel Candy	6/0 6/3
2019	(United Kingdom) Claire Fahey / (United Kingdom) Tara Lumley		
2020-2021	Not held		
2022	(United Kingdom) Claire Fahey / (United States) Frederika Adam	(Australia) Xanthe Ranger / (United States) Megan Hayes	6/0 6/0
2023	(United Kingdom) Claire Fahey / (United Kingdom) Penny Lumley	(Netherlands) Saskia Bollerman / (France) Lea Van Der Zwalmen	6/3 6/5
2024	(United Kingdom) Claire Fahey / (United Kingdom) Alex Brodie	(Australia) Xanthe Ranger / (Australia) Jo See Tan	6/0 6/0
2025	(France) Lea Van Der Zwalmen / (United States) Annie Clark	(United Kingdom) Claire Fahey / (Australia) Jo See Tan	6/4 3/6 6/2
