= 2021 British Open (real tennis) =

- Date: 14-23 November
- Edition: 43rd
- Category: IRTPA
- Draw: 24S / 12D (men)
- Location: West Kensington, London, United Kingdom
- Venue: Queen's Club

Champions

Men's singles
- (United Kingdom) John Lumley

Men's doubles
- (Australia) Robert Fahey / (Australia) Nick Howell
← 2019 ·	British Open (real tennis)	· 2022 →

The 2021 Real Tennis British Open was the 42nd edition of the British Open since it became an annual event in 1979. The men's event was held at the Queen's Club in London between November 13–22, 2022 and was organised by the Tennis and Rackets Association. It was a qualifying event for the 2023 Real Tennis World Championship. There was no women's competition due to the COVID-19 pandemic, which also significantly reduced the number of international entrants in the men's draw. The men's draw was the second and final grand slam event of the year, as no French or Australian Opens would be organised in 2021.

The men's singles draw was won by John Lumley, his first Open title. He beat Ben Taylor-Matthews in the final, both of whom were playing a British Open final for the first time. Lumley became the second British player to win an Open title since 1999, after Bryn Sayers' two titles in 2012 In the doubles draw Rob Fahey and Nick Howell beat Bryn Sayers and Ben Taylor-Matthews, their second victory as a pair following the 2018 edition. Will Flynn made his British Open debut in the singles draw.

== Draw and results ==
Amateur players are marked as (A)

=== Men's Singles Qualifying ===
==== First Qualifier ====
Qualifying Round 1
1	(United Kingdom) N Merola	w/o
	(United Kingdom) C Aley

==== Second Qualifier ====
Final Qualifying Round
2	(United Kingdom) A Player	6	6
	(United Kingdom) H Eddis (A)	2	4

==== Third Qualifier ====
Final Qualifying Round
3	(United Kingdom) W Flynn (A)	6	6
	(United Kingdom) L Williams	4	3

=== Men's Singles ===
First round
Q	(United Kingdom) A Player	5	4	2
(United Kingdom) L Gordon	6	6	6
(United Kingdom) N Mackenzie	6	6	3	6
(United Kingdom) C Fahey	1	4	6	2
(United Kingdom) J Giddins (A)	6	6	6
(United Kingdom) C Greenhalgh	3	0	1
Q	(United Kingdom) W Flynn (A)	4	6	3	3
(United Kingdom) T Durack	6	5	6	6
Q	(United Kingdom) N Merola	3	2	6	6	6
(United Kingdom) Z Eadle	6	6	4	5	2
(United Kingdom) L Gale	w/o
(United Kingdom) J Douglas (A)
(United Kingdom) E Kay (A)	6	6	5	6
(United Kingdom) L Danby (A)	2	2	6	4
(United Kingdom) W Burns	0	3	1
(United Kingdom) R Shenkman (A)	6	6	6

Second Round
1	(Australia) R Fahey	6	6	6
(United Kingdom) L Gordon	0	1	2
5	(France) M Sarlangue (A)	6	6	6
(United Kingdom) Neil Mackenzie	2	2	5
8	(United Kingdom) J Smith	6	6	1	2	5
(United Kingdom) J Giddins (A)	2	3	6	6	6
4	(United Kingdom) J Lumley	6	6	6
(United Kingdom) T Durack	0	0	3
3	(Australia) N Howell	4	6	6	6
(United Kingdom) Z Eadle	6	1	1	2
6	(United Kingdom) B Sayers	6	6	6
(United Kingdom) L Gale	1	3	1
7	(United Kingdom) D Long	3	6	4	6	6
(United Kingdom) E Kay (A)	6	1	6	5	0
2	(United Kingdom) B Taylor-Matthews	6	6	6
(United Kingdom) R Shenkman (A)	3	1	3

Quarterfinals
1	(Australia) R Fahey	6	6	6
5	(France) M Sarlangue (A)	3	0	3
(United Kingdom) J Giddins (A)
4	(United Kingdom) J Lumley	w/o
3	(Australia) N Howell	2	1	0
6	(United Kingdom) B Sayers	6	6	2
7	(United Kingdom) D Long	3	2	1
2	(United Kingdom) B Taylor-Matthews	6	6	6

Semifinals
1	(Australia) R Fahey	4	0	4
4	(United Kingdom) J Lumley	6	6	6
6	(United Kingdom) B Sayers	2	6	3	5
2	(United Kingdom) B Taylor-Matthews	6	5	6	6

Finals
4	(United Kingdom) J Lumley	4	6	6	6
2	(United Kingdom) B Taylor-Matthews	6	4	2	0

=== Men's Doubles Qualifying ===
==== First Qualifier ====
Final Qualifying Round
1	(United Kingdom) S Blaber (United Kingdom) N Wood	6	0	6
	(United Kingdom) H Eddis (A) (United Kingdom) B Ronaldson	4	6	0

==== Second Qualifier ====
First Qualifying Round				Final Qualifying Round
				2	(United Kingdom) C Fahey (United Kingdom) L Gale	6	6
					(United Kingdom) J Acheson-Gray (A) (United Kingdom) A Dolman (A)	2	4
(United Kingdom) N Merola (United Kingdom) A Player	4	6	4		(United Kingdom) J Acheson-Gray (A) (United Kingdom) A Dolman (A)	2	4
(United Kingdom) J Acheson-Gray (A) (United Kingdom) A Dolman (A)	'6	2	6

=== Men's Doubles ===
First round
Q	(United Kingdom) S Blaber (United Kingdom) N Wood	6	6	6
(United Kingdom) Z Eadle (United Kingdom) C Greenhalgh	4	5	3
6	(United Kingdom) D Long (United Kingdom) R Shenkman	2	2	6	3
(United Kingdom) J Douglas (A) (United Kingdom) P Wright (A)	6	6	3	6
Q	(United Kingdom) C Fahey (United Kingdom) L Gale	3	1	6	4
5	(United Kingdom) J Giddins (A) (United Kingdom) E Kay (A)	6	6	5	6
(United Kingdom) T Durack (United Kingdom) L Gordon	6	6	6
(United Kingdom) N Mackenzie (United Kingdom) J Smith	5	3	3

Quarter-finals
1	(Australia) R Fahey (Australia) N Howell	6	6	6
(United Kingdom) S Blaber (United Kingdom) N Wood	1	1	2
3	(United Kingdom) J Lumley (United Kingdom) C Medlow	6	6	6
(United Kingdom) J Douglas (A) (United Kingdom) P Wright (A)	1	1	3
4	(United Kingdom) R McNaughtan (France) M Sarlangue (A)	w/o
5	(United Kingdom) J Giddins (A) (United Kingdom) E Kay (A)
2	(United Kingdom) B Sayers (Australia) B Taylor-Matthews	6	6	6
(United Kingdom) T Durack (United Kingdom) L Gordon	3	4	3

Semi-finals
1	(Australia) R Fahey (Australia) N Howell	5	6	6	6
3	(United Kingdom) J Lumley (United Kingdom) C Medlow	6	2	5	0
4	(United Kingdom) R McNaughtan (France) M Sarlangue (A)	1	2	4
2	(United Kingdom) B Sayers (Australia) B Taylor-Matthews	6	6	6

Final
1	(Australia) R Fahey (Australia) N Howell	6	6	6
2	(United Kingdom) B Sayers (Australia) B Taylor-Matthews	5	4	4

== See also ==
- Grand Slam (real tennis)
