= Julian Snow (real tennis) =

English real tennis player

- Full name: Julian Snow
- Country (sports): United Kingdom
- Residence: England, exeter Australia
- Born: 16 June 1964 (age 61)
- Turned pro: Amateur
- Plays: Right-handed

World Championships
- Open Singles: Challenger (1998)
- Open Doubles: W (2001)

Singles
- Career titles: 8

Grand Slam singles results
- Australian Open: W (1992)
- British Open: W (1992, 1993, 1994, 1998)
- French Open: W (1992)
- US Open: W (1996, 1997)

Doubles
- Career titles: 11

Grand Slam doubles results
- Australian Open: W (1992, 2007, 2015)
- French Open: W (1997)
- British Open: W (1997, 1998)
- US Open: W (1992, 1996, 1997, 1999, 2000)

Julian Snow (born 16 June 1964) is a champion amateur real tennis player.

Snow learned to play the sport as a pupil at Ludgrove School. He has won 19 British Amateur Singles Championships (1987–1989, 1991–2005, 2012), eclipsing Howard Angus' previous record of 16 wins.

He also won the Field Trophy with Leamington in 2020, 8 national Open titles: 4 British Opens (1992–1994, 1998), 2 US Opens (1996,1997), French Open (1992), and Australian Open (1992), as well as 15 Open doubles titles (6 US, 4 French, 3 Aus, 2 British) between 1985 & 2015. He was ranked No. 1 in the world from November 1992 to October 1993, and won the inaugural World Championship Doubles with American professional Tim Chisholm in 2001 at the Burroughs Club, Middlesex University in north London.

Julian Snow challenged for the World Championship four times, reaching the challenge round in 1998 when he lost 7 sets to 4 to Robert Fahey in Melbourne.

He has worked as futures trader and as a full-time gambler betting on horseracing. In 2005 he moved to Australia to study law at the University of Melbourne. He signed the Bar Roll in Victoria, to practise as a barrister, on 22 May 2008.
