= Tennis and Racquet Club =

Private club in Boston, Massachusetts

Coordinates: 42°20′53″N 71°5′6″W

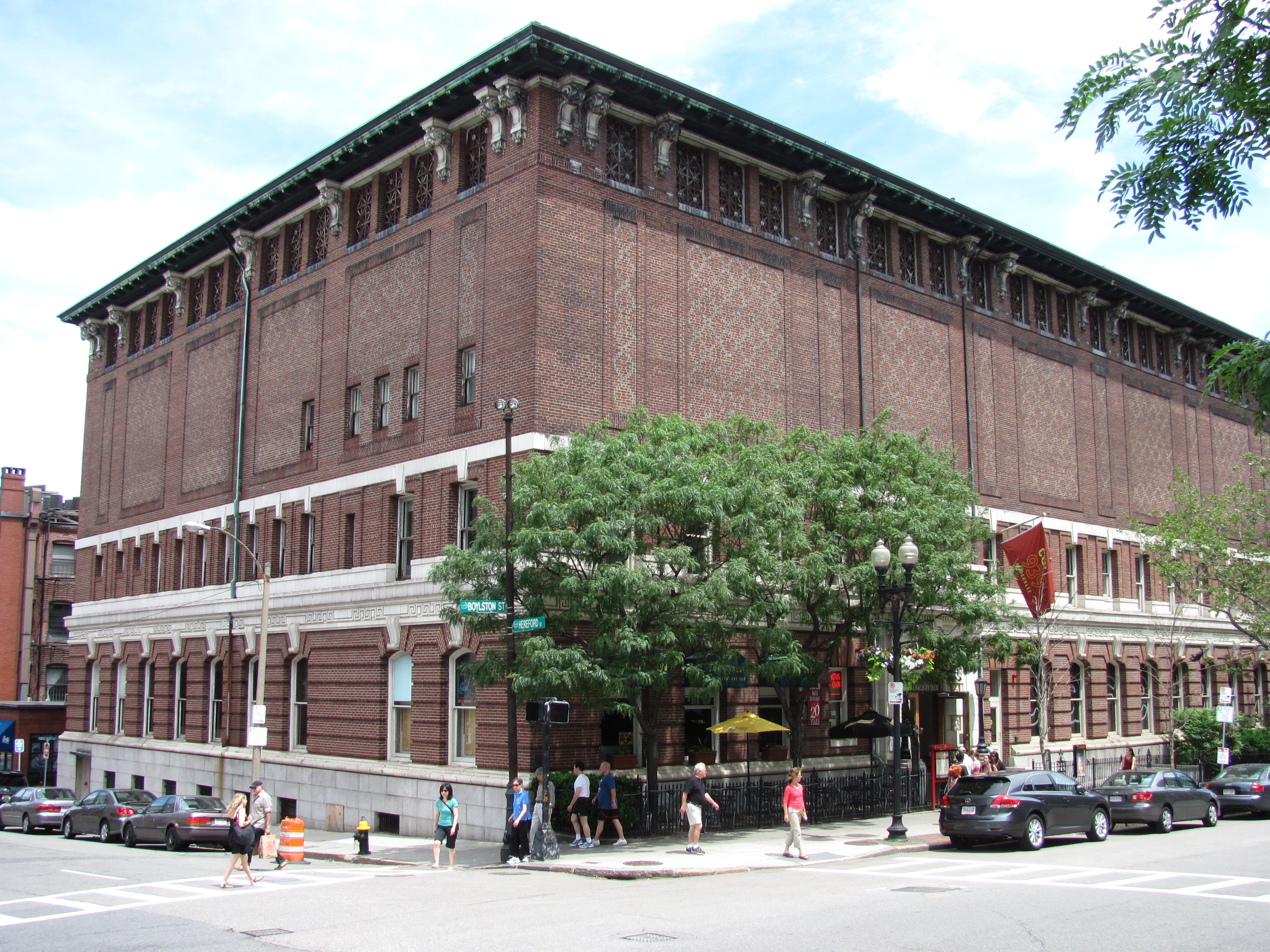
Tennis and Racquet Club

The Tennis and Racquet Club is a private social club and athletic club located at 939 Boylston Street, in the Back Bay neighborhood of Boston, Massachusetts.

Designed by Parker and Thomas in the classical revival style, and built by Frank L. Whitcomb in 1902, the Tennis and Racquet Club is representative of the ornate private clubs constructed in Boston during the early twentieth century.

The club contains its original real tennis court and racquets court. The club also has three international and three North American squash courts, although previously there had been more, including a squash tennis court. Additionally, the club is home to one of the nine real tennis courts in the United States. Many of the original social rooms have been converted into office or restaurant rentals.

== See also ==
- List of American gentlemen's clubs
