= Tuxedo Club =

Private country club in Tuxedo Park, New York

Coordinates: 41°9′47″N 74°14′3″W

The Tuxedo Club
- Interactive map of The Tuxedo Club

Club information
- Location: Main clubhouse: Tuxedo Park, NY; Golf clubhouse: Tuxedo, NY
- Type: Private
- Total holes: 18
- Website: thetuxedoclub.org
- Designed by: Robert Trent Jones, Sr.
- Par: 71
- Length: 6,807 yards
- Course rating: 74.2

The Tuxedo Club is a private member-owned country club located on West Lake Road in the village of Tuxedo Park, New York, in the Ramapo Mountains. Founded in 1886 by Pierre Lorillard IV, its facilities now include an 18-hole golf course, lawn tennis, court tennis, racquets, squash, platform tennis, padel, olympic-sized pool, and boating.

== History ==
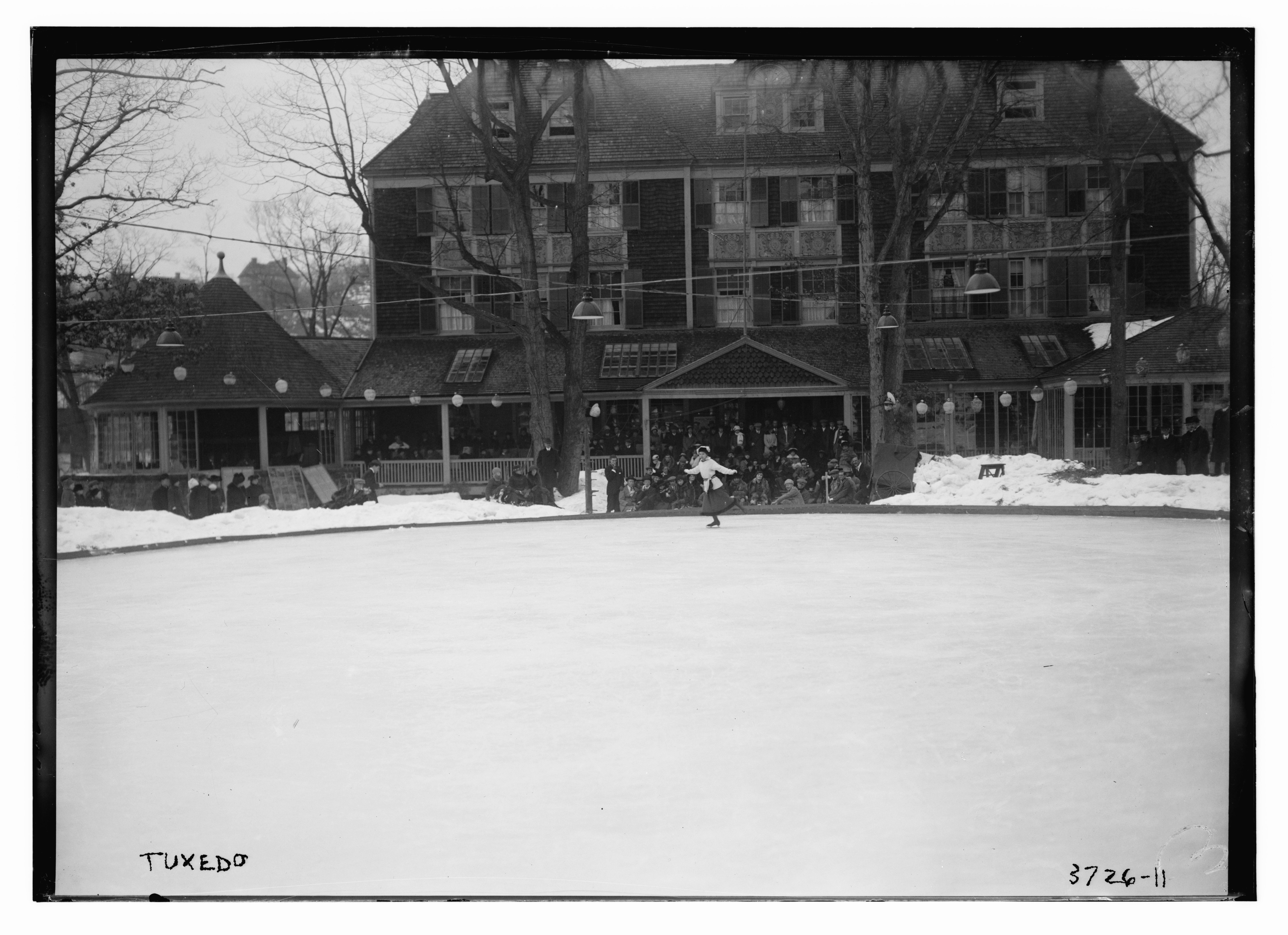
The original clubhouse, c. 1910

The original clubhouse, designed by Bruce Price, was built in 1886; the club was opened on June 16 of that year. Price's clubhouse was demolished in 1927, and John Russell Pope's clubhouse was constructed on the original stone foundations the following year. The clubhouse is U-shaped, with stucco over wood frame, low hipped slate roof, stone embedded in stucco, leaded glass casements, and mullions forming crossettes in continuous fenestration. Located at the foot of Tuxedo Lake, it commands a view to the other end of lake and two ranges of wooded hills. A lawn extends between the club house and the lake.

To the northwest of the clubhouse is the court tennis and racquet house, also on West Lake Road, and overlooking a lake. Designed by architects Warren and Wetmore, it was built between 1890 and 1900. Made of Bickley cement and supported by stone and brick arches in the basement, these courts became a model for future courts built in the United States. They have full galleries for spectators. The original glass roof with canvasses has been replaced with artificial light.

== Golf course ==
The golf course does not sit near the main clubhouse facility. It is roughly 5 miles (8 km) away just outside the gates of the private community known as Tuxedo Park where the main club, tennis club and pool are located. The golf course is actually the third golf course of the club, as the first became the Blair estate and the second was overtaken by the New York State Thruway, forcing the move of the course to the new location near the Eagle Valley section of Tuxedo. The course existing today was designed by Robert Trent Jones, Sr. It is an 18-hole championship course.
