= United States Court Tennis Association =

Governing body of tennis in the United States

The United States Court Tennis Association is the governing body for the sport of real tennis in the United States. The first association president, William L. Van Alen, convened its initial meeting on January 30, 1955, at New York City's Racquet and Tennis Club. William F. McLaughlin Jr. was president from 2001 to 2006 and while the USCTA celebrated its 50th anniversary at the Racquet Club of Philadelphia. The new president, Jim Wharton, was appointed in 2006.

The United States Court Tennis Preservation Foundation, incorporated in Philadelphia, Pennsylvania on May 26, 1994, is an affiliated charitable organization (501(c)3) that promotes education and training for young players, the preservation of existing historic courts, and construction of new venues. The foundation's largest project to date was assisting in the construction of the International Tennis Club of Washington. This was the first court built in the United States in over 80 years. Haven N. B. Pell is Chairman (2005-) and Jonathan H. Pardee is chairman emeritus. The foundation is headquartered at the Racquet Club of Philadelphia.

In 2014 there were 10 active courts (at 9 clubs) in the United States: Boston, Newport, Tuxedo Park, NY, New York City, Lakewood, NJ (Georgian Court University), Philadelphia, Chicago, McLean, VA and Aiken, SC. Greentree, Manhasset Long Island is dormant.
