= Steve Virgona =

Australian real tennis player

- Full name: Steven Virgona
- Country (sports): Australia
- Residence: United States
- Born: 25 September 1978 (age 47)
- Plays: Left-handed
- Club: Racquet Club of Chicago

World Championships
- Open Singles: Challenger (2010, 2012)
- Open Doubles: W (2003, 2005, 2007, 2009, 2011, 2013)

Singles
- Career titles: 7
- Current ranking: 6

Grand Slam singles results
- Australian Open: W (2005, 2007, 2011, 2013)
- British Open: W (2013, 2015)
- French Open: F (2005, 2010, 2011, 2013, 2014, 2015, 2023)
- US Open: W (2011)

Doubles
- Career titles: 26
- Current ranking: 5

Grand Slam doubles results
- Australian Open: W (1998, 1999, 2003, 2005, 2006, 2011, 2012, 2013, 2024)
- French Open: W (1998, 2009, 2010, 2023)
- British Open: W (1999, 2001, 2002, 2009, 2010, 2011, 2012, 2015)
- US Open: W (1998, 2007, 2008, 2010, 2011, 2012)

Steve Virgona (born 25 September 1978) is an Australian professional real tennis player based in Chicago. As of 2017, he is ranked number three in the world. Virgona's victories include the Australian Open (four times), the British Open (twice) and the US Open.

== Career ==
Virgona started his career as a professional at the Ballarat real tennis club before moving to Melbourne at the age of 18. Steve gained much success early by playing doubles, and reaching the final of the British Open in 2001 and winning the doubles at the 1998 US Open. Virgona worked as a professional in London, primarily at the Burroughs club, before moving back to Melbourne in 2004. After securing a position in Philadelphia in 2006, Virgona's tennis improved markedly and his ranking rose to world number 2. He defeated world champion Robert Fahey twice in 2006, but lost his world championship campaign to Tim Chisholm that year.

Steve's tennis continued to improve, winning the Australian Open, and entered the 2008 world championships as the favourite to challenge Fahey. He lost narrowly to Camden Riviere in the final eliminator, and got revenge soon after in the US Open.

In 2010, he won the US Open doubles championship, partnered by Ben Matthews.
