= Camden Riviere =

American real tennis player

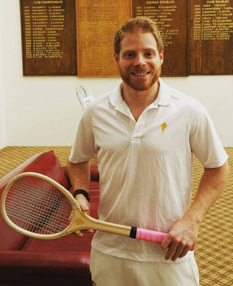
- Full name: Camden Scott Riviere
- Country (sports): United States
- Residence: United States
- Born: 20 May 1987 (age 39)
- Plays: Left-handed
- Club: Westwood Country Club, Vienna, Virginia (Touring professional), Aiken Tennis Club, SC

World Championships
- Open Singles: W (2016, 2022, 2023, 2025)
- Open Doubles: W (2015, 2017, 2019, 2022, 2024)

Singles
- Career titles: 32
- Highest ranking: 1
- Current ranking: 1

Grand Slam singles results
- Australian Open: W (2015, 2017, 2019, 2025)
- British Open: W (2014, 2016, 2017, 2019, 2022, 2023, 2024)
- French Open: W (2012, 2013, 2014, 2016, 2017, 2019, 2022, 2024)
- US Open: W (2009, 2013, 2014, 2015, 2016, 2017, 2018, 2019, 2020, 2021, 2022, 2023, 2024)

Doubles
- Career titles: 33
- Highest ranking: 1
- Current ranking: 1

Grand Slam doubles results
- Australian Open: W (2015, 2017, 2019, 2025)
- French Open: W (2007, 2008, 2011, 2012, 2014, 2016, 2017, 2019, 2022, 2024)
- British Open: W (2014, 2016, 2017, 2019, 2022, 2023, 2024)
- US Open: W (2006, 2009, 2013, 2014, 2015, 2016, 2017, 2019, 2020, 2021, 2022, 2023, 2024, 2025)

Camden Riviere (born 1987) is an American left-handed real tennis player and current world champion. He became world champion on May 21, 2016, defeating long-time holder Robert Fahey 7 sets to 2 at Riviere's home court, the National Tennis Club, Newport, Rhode Island. Two years later, at Riviere's first defense of the title, Fahey reclaimed the title beating Riviere by 7 sets to 5 at Queen's Club, London. Riviere regained the title from Fahey at the 2022 World Championship played at Prested Hall in Feering, Essex, England, winning by 7 sets to 5. He retained the title in 2023, defeating John Lumley 7 sets to 3 at the Westwood Country Club in Vienna, Virginia, and in 2025, again defeating John Lumley 7 sets to 1 at the National Tennis Club, Newport, Rhode Island

Since September 2013, Riviere has been ranked world number 1.

== Early life ==
Camden Scott Riviere was born May 20, 1987, in Charleston, South Carolina, but was raised in nearby Aiken, South Carolina. He started playing real tennis at age 5 with his father Rhett and grandfather Hank at the Aiken Tennis Club and played his first tournament at age 7. Camden's first coach was the Aiken professional (at that time) Mark Devine. As a junior, Camden competed on the American Junior Squads including the Clothier Cup team, and the Van Allen Cup team. During his early teens Camden competed as a top-level amateur, winning such tournaments as the US Amateur and the Tuxedo Gold Racquet. Camden also played for the United States on the Bathurst Cup Team. Camden grew up playing with Ivan Ronaldson, former world champion Chris Ronaldson's son.

== Professional life ==
In May 2005, at age 17, Camden moved to the UK and turned professional, working at Hampton Court Palace under Chris Ronaldson. After a year in the UK, Camden returned to the US and became a touring professional based out of Newport, RI. From 2006 to 2008 Camden trained in Newport under coach Josh Bainton, and continued to rise up the ranking, until finally reaching the ranking of #5 in the world in 2008. This allowed Camden to qualify for the World Championship Eliminators, where at the age of 20, he defeated the other top 4 players in the world, and qualified to challenge for the World Championship being narrowly defeated by Rob Fahey 7 sets to 5.

In September 2008 Camden joined the team at the Tennis and Racquet Club, Boston, as a real tennis, racquets, and squash professional. Over the next three years Riviere would continue to rise in the rankings to #2 in the world, and won his first major tournament, the U.S. Open, in Philadelphia on March 1, 2009.

In November 2011, Camden returned to being a touring professional based out of Charleston, South Carolina. Since returning to a touring professional state Camden has accumulated a mass of titles and on September 1, 2013, became the #1 ranked player in the world. Since the world ranking system was created in 1991, no American had been ranked number 1 in the world. Rob Fahey had been number one for the past twenty years, but in late August 2013 Riviere passed Fahey and has since retained the number 1 ranking.

=== Career as World #1 ===
2014 saw another great year for Camden, as he won 3 out of the 4 Opens (US, French, British), won a majority of the Professional events, and earned his second challenge for the World Championship. Camden was defeated by Rob Fahey in the World Championship at the Royal Melbourne Tennis Club 7 sets to 3 in May.

2015 started well for Riviere, winning the Australian Open Singles and Doubles titles in January, completing the grand slam (holder of all 4 Opens at one time – US, French, British, Australian) in both singles and doubles. In February, Camden defended his US Open Singles and Doubles titles, winning both for the third consecutive year in a row, as well as extending his lead as the #1 ranked player in the world. In June 2015 Camden became the World Champion of Doubles alongside Tim Chisholm, winning the event hosted in Tuxedo Park, NY over the previous champions by a score of 5 sets to 0. Following the WCD, Camden successfully defended his US Professional Singles title, winning the tournament for the 6th consecutive year in a row, and in the process completing an undefeated 2014/2015 season.

In February 2015 Camden took the Head professional Position at the Aiken Tennis Club where he learned the sport. In July 2015 Camden took over the role of Head Professional at the National Tennis Club in Newport, RI. This would mark this end of his season though, as a reoccurring shoulder injury forced Camden to take the remainder of the year off in order to do physical therapy.

2016 could go down as Camden's best year yet, winning his 4th consecutive (and 5th overall) US Open Singles and Doubles titles, and in late May becoming the Real Tennis World Champion. Camden defeated Rob Fahey by a score of 7 sets to 2 in Newport, RI at the 2016 Real Tennis World Championship. This marks the first time in over 42 years that an American has held the title, and made Riviere only the 5th American overall to hold it. Camden was the 25th holder of the Real Tennis World Championship, the longest running world championship of any sport. Camden followed up this accomplishment by winning his 7th consecutive US Professional Singles title in Newport in June.

On January 12, 2017, the General Assembly of South Carolina adopted a Concurrent Resolution, Bill 3454, "to congratulate and celebrate South Carolina son Camden Riviere for his impressive accomplishment of winning the 2016 real tennis World Championship and to wish him well in his future endeavors."

In April 2017 at Prested Hall Real Tennis Club, Camden and his doubles partner, Tim Chisholm, defended their World Championship Doubles title against challengers Ricardo and Robert Fahey. Smith and Fahey won the first four sets on day 1 of the challenge. Requiring five consecutive set wins on day 2 to retain their title in the -of-nine-set match, Riviere and Chisholm accomplished this, winning the final fiver sets. The final score was: 4/6 2/6 2/6 4/6 6/3 6/3 6/1 6/1 6/3.

In April 2018 in the first defence of his World Championship title, Riviere lost to former champion Robert Fahey by 7 sets to 5 at Queen's Club, London. The final score was: 6/4 3/6 5/6 0/6 6/5 6/4 6/3 6/1 5/6 0/6 6/3 6/3.

In 2020, he again was selected as challenger. However, due to the pandemic, the challenge was postponed until September 2022. Riviere beat Fahey by 7 sets to 5: 5/6 6/3 4/6 6/2 6/2 6/2 6/3 5/6 6/3 3/6 5/6 6/2.

A year later, in September 2023, Riviere retained the title, beating the first-time-challenger, John Lumley, by 7 sets to 3: 6/4 6/2 6/3 6/4 4/6 6/3 5/6 5/6 6/5 6/3.

Two years later, in September 2025, Riviere again retained the title, again beating Lumley, this time by 7 sets to 1: 6/2 6/3 6/4 6/4 5/6 6/4 6/4 6/4.

== Performance timeline ==
=== Singles ===
Key
W	F	SF	QF	#R	RR	Q#	DNQ	A	NH

(W) winner; (F) finalist; (SF) semifinalist; (QF) quarterfinalist; (#R) rounds 4, 3, 2, 1; (RR) round-robin stage; (Q#) qualification round; (DNQ) did not qualify; (A) absent; (NH) not held; (SR) strike rate (events won / competed); (W–L) win–loss record.
To avoid confusion and double counting, these charts are updated at the conclusion of a tournament or when the player's participation has ended.

Current through the 2025 US Open

Tournament	2005	2006	2007	2008	2009	2010	2011	2012	2013	2014	2015	2016	2017	2018	2019	2020	2021	2022	2023	2024	2025	SR	W–L	Win %
World Championship
World Championship	NH	DNQ	NH	F	NH	2R	NH	DNQ	NH	F	NH	W	NH	F	NH			W	W	NH	TBC	3 / 7	15–4	79%
Win–loss	0–0	0–0	0–0	4–1	0–0	2–1	0–0	0–0	0–0	3–1	0–0	2–0	0–0	0–1	0–0	0–0	0–0	3–0	1–0	0–0	0–0	3 / 7	15–4	79%
Grand Slam tournaments
Australian Open	A	QF	A	A	A	A	A	A	F	A	W	A	W	A	W	A	NH	A	A	A	W	4 / 6	18–2	90%
British Open	QF	SF	SF	F	SF	A	A	SF	A	W	A	W	W	A	W	NH	A	W	W	W		7 / 13	39–6	87%
French Open	SF	SF	F	F	F	SF	SF	W	W	W	A	W	W	A	W	NH		W	A	W		8 / 15	48–7	87%
US Open	A	SF	SF	SF	W	SF	F	A	W	W	W	W	W	W	W	W	W	W	W	W	F	13 / 19	64–6	91%
Win–loss	3–2	7–4	7–3	8–3	9–2	4–2	5–2	6–1	11–1	12–0	7–0	12–0	15–0	4–0	14–0	3–0	3–0	12–0	8–0	12–0	7–1	32 / 53	169–21	89%
IRTPA Sanctioned Tournaments
Champions Trophy	NH									NH			W	W	A	NH		A	A	A	A	2 / 2	6–0	100%
European Open	A	A	SF	W	F	NH	A	W	W	NH	A	NH									NH	3 / 5	15–2	88%
IRTPA Championship	QF	F	SF	NH	A	SF	A	W	W	W	A	NH	W	A	A	NH						4 / 8	23–4	85%
US Pro	QF	SF	F	SF	SF	W	W	W	W	W	W	W	W	W	W	NH	W	W	W	W	A	14 / 19	66–5	93%
Win–loss	3–2	5–2	7–3	6–1	5–2	6–1	4–0	10–0	11–0	8–0	4–0	4–0	11–0	7–0	4–0	0–0	3–0	4–0	4–0	4–0	0–0	23 / 34	110–11	91%
Career Statistics
	2005	2006	2007	2008	2009	2010	2011	2012	2013	2014	2015	2016	2017	2018	2019	2020	2021	2022	2023	2024	2025	Career		
Tournaments	4	6	6	6	5	5	3	5	6	6	3	5	7	4	5	1	2	5	4	4	2	Career total: 94		
Titles	0	0	0	1	1	1	1	4	5	5	3	5	7	3	5	1	2	5	4	4	1	Career total: 58		
Finals	0	1	2	4	3	1	2	4	6	6	3	5	7	4	5	1	2	5	4	4	2	Career total: 71		
Overall win–loss	6–4	12–6	14–6	18–5	14–4	12–4	9–2	16–1	22–1	23–1	11–0	18–0	26–0	11–1	18–0	3–0	6–0	19–0	13–0	16–0	7–1	294–36		89%
Win %	60%	67%	70%	78%	78%	75%	82%	94%	96%	96%	100%	100%	100%	92%	100%	100%	100%	100%	100%	100%	88%	Career total: 89%		

Tournament	2006	2007	2008	2009	2010	2011	2012	2013	2014	2015	2016	2017	2018	2019	2020	2021	2022	2023	2024	2025	SR	W–L	Win %
World Championship
World Championship	NH	F	NH	SF	NH	DNQ	NH	F	NH	W	NH	W	NH	W	NH		F	NH	W		4 / 8	17–5	77%
Win–loss	0–0	2–1	0–0	1–1	0–0	0–0	0–0	1–1	0–0	3–0	0–0	3–1	0–0	3–0	0–0	0–0	2–1	0–0	2–0	0–0	5 / 8	17–5	77%
Grand Slam tournaments
Australian Open	A	A	A	A	NH	A	A	F	A	W	A	W	A	W	A	NH	A	A	A	W	4 / 5	13–1	93%
British Open	A	SF	F	SF	A	A	SF	A	W	A	W	W	A	W	NH	A	W	W	W		7 / 11	26–3	90%
French Open	F	W	W	1R	F	W	W	NH	W	A	W	W	A	W	NH		W	A	W		10 / 13	31–3	91%
US Open	W	SF	F	W	F	F	A	W	W	W	W	W	W	W	W	W	W	F	W	W	14 / 19	48–4	92%
Win–loss	3–1	5–2	8–1	4–2	3–2	5–1	3–1	5–1	9–0	5–0	9–0	12–0	3–0	10–0	2–0	3–0	9–0	5–0	9–0	6–0	35 / 48	118–11	91%
IRTPA Sanctioned Tournaments
IRTPA Championship	NH	A	NH								A	W	A	NH							1 / 1	1–0	100%
Win–loss	0–0	0–0	0–0	0–0	0–0	0–0	0–0	0–0	0–0	0–0	0–0	1–0	0–0	0–0	0–0	0–0	0–0	0–0	0–0	0–0	1 / 1	1–0	100%
Career Statistics
	2006	2007	2008	2009	2010	2011	2012	2013	2014	2015	2016	2017	2018	2019	2020	2021	2022	2023	2024	2025	Career		
Tournaments	2	4	3	4	2	2	2	3	3	3	3	6	1	5	1	1	4	2	4	2	Career total: 57		
Titles	1	1	1	1	0	1	1	1	3	3	3	6	1	5	1	1	4	1	4	2	Career total: 41		
Finals	2	2	2	1	2	2	1	3	3	3	3	6	1	5	1	1	4	1	4	2	Career total: 49		
Overall win–loss	3–1	7–3	8–1	5–3	3–2	5–1	3–1	6–2	9–0	8–0	9–0	16–1	3–0	13–0	2–0	3–0	11–1	5–0	11–0	6–0	136–16		89%
Win %	75%	70%	89%	63%	60%	83%	75%	75%	100%	100%	100%	94%	100%	100%	100%	100%	92%	100%	100%	100%	Career total: 89%		

== See also ==
- List of real tennis world champions
