= Grand Slam (real tennis) =

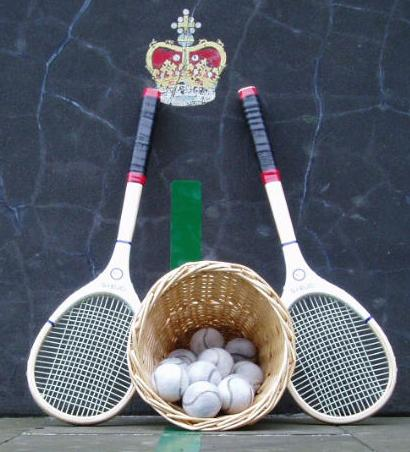
Real tennis equipment

A Grand Slam in the sport of real tennis is earned by a player who holds the following titles in the same calendar year:

- Australian Open
- US Open
- French Open
- British Open

The concept was borrowed from lawn tennis's Grand Slam. As not all events have been played in the same season, 1981 was the first year it was possible to attain all four major titles.

In 1984, Chris Ronaldson was the first to win the Grand Slam. In 2000 and 2001, Robert Fahey earned back-to-back Grand Slams, and earned a third Grand Slam in 2008. Camden Riviere earned Grand Slams in 2017 and 2019. For women, Charlotte Cornwallis completed it in 2006, while Claire Fahey has done so on seven occasions so in 2010, 2011, 2012 2014, 2017, 2019 and 2024.

== Men's singles ==
Prior to 1979, the British Open Singles Championship was awarded to the winner of the Prince's Club Shield, including after the dissolution of the Prince's Club in 1940. The championship was held as a challenge event, where an event was only held should the incumbent title holder be challenged, as such it was not held annually. After the 1979 Championship between Howard Angus and Chris Ronaldson in a combined challenge for the World Championship, it was agreed that the British Open would continue as an annual event and that the World Championship would remain a challenge event.

Year	Australian Open	US Open	French Open	British Open
1919	Not held	(United States) Jay Gould II	Not held	Not held
1920	Not held	Not held	Not held	Not held
1921	Not held	(United States) Jay Gould II	Not held	Not held
1922-1930	Not held	Not held	Not held	Not held
1931	Not held	Not held	Not held	(United Kingdom) E M Baerlein (United Kingdom) Ernest Willie Ratcliffe
1932	(Australia) Percy Finch	Not held	Not held	(United Kingdom) William Groom
1933	(Australia) Percy Finch	Not held	Not held	Not challenged
1934	(Australia) Percy Finch	Not held	Not held	(United Kingdom) L Lees
1935	(Australia) Percy Finch	Not held	Not held	(United Kingdom) L Lees
1936	(Australia) Percy Finch	Not held	Not held	Not challenged
1937	(Australia) Percy Finch	Not held	Not held	Not challenged
1938	(Australia) Percy Finch	Not held	Not held	(United Kingdom) Jim Dear
1939	(Australia) Percy Finch	Not held	Not held	Not challenged
1940	(Australia) Percy Finch	Not held	Not held	Not challenged
1941	(Australia) Percy Finch	Not held	Not held	Not challenged
1942	(Australia) Percy Finch	Not held	Not held	Not challenged
1943	(Australia) Percy Finch	Not held	Not held	Not challenged
1944	(Australia) Percy Finch	Not held	Not held	Not challenged
1945	(Australia) Percy Finch	Not held	Not held	Not challenged
1946	(Australia) Percy Finch	Not held	Not held	Not challenged
1947	(Australia) Percy Finch	Not held	Not held	Not challenged
1948	(Australia) A W Knight	Not held	Not held	Not challenged
1949	(Australia) A W Knight	Not held	Not held	Not challenged
1950	(Australia) A W Knight	Not held	Not held	(United Kingdom) Ronald Hughes
1951	(Australia) A W Knight	(United States) Alastair Martin	Not held	(United Kingdom) Jim Dear
1952	(Australia) Robert Baker	Not held	Not held	(United Kingdom) Ronald Hughes
1953	(Australia) Robert Baker	Not held	Not held	Not challenged
1954	(Australia) Robert Baker	Not held	Not held	Not challenged
1955	(Australia) Robert Baker	Not held	Not held	Not challenged
1956	(Australia) Robert Baker	(United Kingdom) Albert Johnson	Not held	Not challenged
1957	(Australia) Robert Baker	(United Kingdom) Albert Johnson	Not held	Not challenged
1958	(Australia) Robert Baker	(United Kingdom) Albert Johnson	Not held	Not challenged
1959	(Australia) Robert Baker	(United Kingdom) Albert Johnson	Not held	Not challenged
1960	(Australia) Robert Baker	(United States) James F.C. Bostwick	Not held	Not challenged
1961	(Australia) Robert Baker	(United States) James F.C. Bostwick	Not held	Not challenged
1962	(Australia) Robert Baker	(United States) James F.C. Bostwick	Not held	(United Kingdom) Ronald Hughes
1963	(Australia) Robert Baker	(United Kingdom) Albert Johnson	Not held	Not challenged
1964	(Australia) Robert Baker	R Hughes	Not held	Not challenged
1965	(Australia) Robert Baker	(United Kingdom) Albert Johnson	Not held	Not challenged
1966	(Australia) Robert Baker	(United States) James F.C. Bostwick	Not held	Not challenged
1967	(Australia) Robert Baker	(United States) Eugene Scott	Not held	(United Kingdom) Frank Willis
1968	(Australia) Barry Toates	(United States) Eugene Scott	Not held	(United Kingdom) Frank Willis
1969	(Australia) Barry Toates	(United States) James F.C. Bostwick	Not held	Not challenged
1970	(Australia) Barry Toates	(United States) James F.C. Bostwick	Not held	(United Kingdom) Howard R. Angus
1971	(Australia) Barry Toates	(United States) G.H. Bostwick Jr.	Not held	Not challenged
1972	(Australia) Barry Toates	(United States) James F.C. Bostwick	Not held	(United Kingdom) Howard R. Angus
1973	(Australia) Barry Toates	(United States) Eugene Scott	Not held	Not challenged
1974	(Australia) Barry Toates	(United States) Eugene Scott	Not held	Not challenged
1975	(Australia) Barry Toates	(United States) Eugene Scott	Not held	(United Kingdom) Howard R. Angus
1976	(Australia) Barry Toates	(United States) Eugene Scott	Not held	(United Kingdom) Howard R. Angus
1977	(United Kingdom) Chris Ronaldson (1/19)	(United States) Eugene Scott	Not held	Not challenged
1978	(United Kingdom) Chris Ronaldson (2/19)	(United States) James J. Burke Jr.	Not held	Not challenged
1979	(Australia) Barry Toates	(Australia) Barry Toates	Not held	(United Kingdom) Howard R. Angus (Note: The 1979 British Open Singles was jointly contested with the 1979 Real Tennis World Championship. It was won by Howard Angus 7-0 against Chris Ronaldson)
1980	(Australia) Colin Lumley (1/2)	(United Kingdom) Chris Ronaldson (3/19)	Not held	(United Kingdom) Chris Ronaldson (4/19)
1981	(Australia) Colin Lumley (2/2)	(Australia) Graham Hyland (1/3)	(United Kingdom) Chris Ronaldson (5/19)	(United Kingdom) Chris Ronaldson (6/19)
1982	(United Kingdom) Chris Ronaldson (7/19)	(Australia) Wayne Davies (1/16)	(United Kingdom) Chris Ronaldson (8/19)	(United Kingdom) Chris Ronaldson (9/19)
1983	(Australia) Wayne Davies (2/16)	(Australia) Wayne Davies (3/16)	(United Kingdom) Chris Ronaldson (10/19)	(United Kingdom) Chris Ronaldson (11/19)
1984	(United Kingdom) Chris Ronaldson (12/19)	(United Kingdom) Chris Ronaldson (13/19)	(United Kingdom) Chris Ronaldson (14/19)	(United Kingdom) Chris Ronaldson (15/19)
1985	(United Kingdom) Chris Ronaldson (16/19)	(Australia) Wayne Davies (4/16)	(Australia) Wayne Davies (5/16)	(United Kingdom) Chris Ronaldson (17/19)
1986	(Australia) Lachlan Deuchar (1/13)	(United Kingdom) Chris Ronaldson (18/19)	(United Kingdom) Chris Ronaldson (19/19)	(Australia) Lachlan Deuchar (2/13)
1987	(Australia) Wayne Davies (6/16)	(Australia) Graham Hyland (2/3)	(Australia) Wayne Davies (7/16)	(Australia) Lachlan Deuchar (3/13)
1988	(Australia) Wayne Davies (8/16)	(Australia) Wayne Davies (9/16)	(Australia) Wayne Davies (10/16)	(Australia) Lachlan Deuchar (4/13)
1989	(Australia) Graham Hyland (3/3)	(Australia) Wayne Davies (11/16)	(Australia) Lachlan Deuchar (5/13)	(Australia) Lachlan Deuchar (6/13)
1990	(Australia) Lachlan Deuchar (7/13)	(Australia) Wayne Davies (12/16)	(Australia) Lachlan Deuchar (8/13)	(Australia) Lachlan Deuchar (9/13)
1991	(Australia) Wayne Davies (13/16)	(Australia) Lachlan Deuchar (10/13)	(Australia) Lachlan Deuchar (11/13)	(Australia) Lachlan Deuchar (12/13)
1992	(United Kingdom) Julian Snow (1/8)	(Australia) Lachlan Deuchar (13/13)	(United Kingdom) Julian Snow (2/8)	(United Kingdom) Julian Snow (3/8)
1993	(Australia) Robert Fahey (1/50)	(Australia) Robert Fahey (2/50)	(Australia) Robert Fahey (3/50)	(United Kingdom) Julian Snow (4/8)
1994	(Australia) Robert Fahey (4/50)	(Australia) Wayne Davies (14/16)	(United Kingdom) Chris Bray (1/5)	(United Kingdom) Julian Snow (5/8)
1995	(Australia) Frank Filippelli (1/1)	(Australia) Wayne Davies (15/16)	(United Kingdom) Mike Gooding (1/3)	(Australia) Robert Fahey (5/50)
1996	(Australia) Robert Fahey (6/50)	(United Kingdom) Julian Snow (6/8)	(United Kingdom) Mike Gooding (2/3)	(United Kingdom) Mike Gooding (3/3)
1997	(Australia) Robert Fahey (7/50)	(United Kingdom) Julian Snow (7/8)	(United Kingdom) Chris Bray (2/5)	(United Kingdom) Chris Bray (3/5)
1998	(Australia) Robert Fahey (8/50)	(United Kingdom) Chris Bray (4/5)	(Australia) Robert Fahey (9/50)	(United Kingdom) Julian Snow (8/8)
1999	(United Kingdom) Chris Bray (5/5)	(Australia) Wayne Davies (16/16)	(Australia) Robert Fahey (10/50)	(United Kingdom) James Male (1/1)
2000	(Australia) Robert Fahey (11/50)	(Australia) Robert Fahey (12/50)	(Australia) Robert Fahey (13/50)	(Australia) Robert Fahey (14/50)
2001	(Australia) Robert Fahey (15/50)	(Australia) Robert Fahey (16/50)	(Australia) Robert Fahey (17/50)	(Australia) Robert Fahey (18/50)
2002	(Australia) Robert Fahey (19/50)	(Australia) Robert Fahey (20/50)	not held	(United States) Tim Chisholm (1/5)
2003	(United States) Tim Chisholm (2/5)	(United States) Tim Chisholm (3/5)	(United States) Tim Chisholm (4/5)	(Australia) Robert Fahey (21/50)
2004	(Australia) Robert Fahey (22/50)	(United States) Tim Chisholm (5/5)	(Australia) Robert Fahey (23/50)	(Australia) Robert Fahey (24/50)
2005	(Australia) Steve Virgona (1/8)	(Australia) Robert Fahey (25/50)	(Australia) Robert Fahey (26/50)	(Australia) Robert Fahey (27/50)
2006	(Australia) Ruaraidh Gunn (1/2)	(Australia) Robert Fahey (28/50)	(Australia) Robert Fahey (29/50)	(Australia) Robert Fahey (30/50)
2007	(Australia) Steve Virgona (2/8)	(Australia) Robert Fahey (31/50)	(Australia) Robert Fahey (32/50)	(Australia) Robert Fahey (33/50)
2008	(Australia) Robert Fahey (34/50)	(Australia) Robert Fahey (35/50)	(Australia) Robert Fahey (36/50)	(Australia) Robert Fahey (37/50)
2009	(Australia) Robert Fahey (38/50)	(United States) Camden Riviere (1/35	(Australia) Robert Fahey (39/50)	(Australia) Robert Fahey (40/50)
2010	(Australia) Ruaraidh Gunn (2/2)	(Bermuda) James Stout (1/1)	(Australia) Robert Fahey (41/50)	(Australia) Robert Fahey (42/50)
2011	(Australia) Steve Virgona (3/8)	(Australia) Steve Virgona (4/8)	(Australia) Robert Fahey (43/50)	(Australia) Robert Fahey (44/50)
2012	(Australia) Robert Fahey (45/50)	(United Kingdom) Bryn Sayers (1/2)	(United States) Camden Riviere (2/35)	(United Kingdom) Bryn Sayers (2/2)
2013	(Australia) Steve Virgona (5/8)	(United States) Camden Riviere (3/35)	(United States) Camden Riviere (4/35)	(Australia) Steve Virgona (6/8)
2014	(Australia) Robert Fahey (46/50)	(United States) Camden Riviere (5/35)	(United States) Camden Riviere (6/35)	(United States) Camden Riviere (7/35)
2015	(United States) Camden Riviere (8/35)	(United States) Camden Riviere (9/35)	(Australia) Robert Fahey (47/50)	(Australia) Steve Virgona (7/8)
2016	(Australia) Robert Fahey (48/50)	(United States) Camden Riviere (10/35)	(United States) Camden Riviere (11/35)	(United States) Camden Riviere (12/35)
2017	(United States) Camden Riviere (13/35)	(United States) Camden Riviere (14/35)	(United States) Camden Riviere (15/35)	(United States) Camden Riviere (16/35)
2018	(Australia) Robert Fahey (49/50)	(United States) Camden Riviere (17/35)	(Australia) Chris Chapman (1/3)	(Australia) Robert Fahey (50/50)
2019	(United States) Camden Riviere (18/35)	(United States) Camden Riviere (19/35)	(United States) Camden Riviere (20/35)	(United States) Camden Riviere (21/35)
2020	(Australia) Chris Chapman (2/3)	(United States) Camden Riviere (22/35)	Not held	Not held
2021	Not held	(United States) Camden Riviere (23/35)	Not held	(United Kingdom) John Lumley (1/4)
2022	(United Kingdom) John Lumley (2/4)	(United States) Camden Riviere (24/35)	(United States) Camden Riviere (25/35)	(United States) Camden Riviere (26/30)
2023	(Australia) Chris Chapman (3/3)	(United States) Camden Riviere (27/35)	(Australia) Nick Howell (1/1)	(United States) Camden Riviere (28/35)
2024	(United Kingdom) John Lumley (3/4)	(United States) Camden Riviere (29/35)	(United States) Camden Riviere (30/35)	(United States) Camden Riviere (31/35)
2025	(United States) Camden Riviere (32/35)	(United Kingdom) John Lumley (4/4)	(Australia) Steve Virgona (7/8)	(United States) Camden Riviere (33/35)
2026	(United States) Camden Riviere (34/35)	(United States) Camden Riviere (35/35)		

== Ladies singles ==
Year	Australian Open	US Open	French Open	British Open
1978	Not held	Not held	Not held	(United Kingdom) Anna Moore (1/1)
1979	Not held	Not held	Not held	(United Kingdom) Lesley Ronaldson (1/5)
1980	Not held	Not held	Not held	(United Kingdom) Lesley Ronaldson (2/5)
1981	Not held	Not held	Not held	(United Kingdom) Lesley Ronaldson (3/5)
1982	Not held	Not held	Not held	(Australia) Judith Clarke (1/1)
1983	Not held	Not held	Not held	(United Kingdom) Katrina Allen (1/8)
1984	Not held	(United Kingdom) Lesley Ronaldson (4/5)	Not held	(United Kingdom) Katrina Allen (2/8)
1985	Not held	Elizabeth Woodthorpe (1/1)	Not held	(United Kingdom) Katrina Allen (3/8)
1986	Not held	(United Kingdom) Sally Jones (1/5)	(United Kingdom) Katrina Allen (4/8)	(United Kingdom) Katrina Allen (5/8)
1987	Not held	(United States) Jane Lippincott (1/4)	(France) Danielle Barrabé (1/1)	(United Kingdom) Leslie Ronaldson (5/5)
1988	Not held	(United States) Jane Lippincott (2/4)	(United Kingdom) Penny Lumley (1/31)	(United Kingdom) Sally Jones (2/5)
1989	Not held	(United Kingdom) Sally Jones (3/5)	(United Kingdom) Penny Lumley (2/31)	(United Kingdom) Penny Lumley (3/31)
1990	(Australia) Helen Mursell (1/6)	Alice Bartlett (1/1)	(United Kingdom) Penny Lumley (4/31)	(United Kingdom) Sally Jones (4/5)
1991	(United Kingdom) Penny Lumley (5/31)	(United Kingdom) Charlotte Cornwallis (1/22)	Magda Groszeck (1/1)	(United Kingdom) Penny Lumley (6/31)
1992	(Australia) Helen Mursell (2/6)	Lissen Tutrone (1/1)	(United Kingdom) Katrina Allen (8/8)	(United Kingdom) Charlotte Cornwallis (2/22)
1993	(Australia) Helen Mursell (3/6)	(Australia) Helen Mursell (4/6)	(United Kingdom) Sally Jones (5/5)	(United Kingdom) Penny Lumley (7/31)
1994	(Australia) Helen Mursell (5/6)	(United States) Jane Lippincott (3/4)	(United Kingdom) Alex Garside (1/2)	(United Kingdom) Alex Garside (2/2)
1995	(Australia) Helen Mursell (6/6)	(United Kingdom) Katrina Allen (9/9)	(United Kingdom) Penny Lumley (8/31)	(United Kingdom) Penny Lumley (9/31)
1996	(Australia) Kate Leeming (1/5)	(United Kingdom) Sue Haswell (1/2)	(United Kingdom) Penny Lumley (10/31)	(United Kingdom) Penny Lumley (11/31)
1997	(United Kingdom) Penny Lumley (12/31)	(United Kingdom) Penny Lumley (13/31)	(United Kingdom) Sue Haswell (2/2)	(United Kingdom) Penny Lumley (14/31)
1998	(Australia) Barbara Baker (1/1)	(United Kingdom) Penny Lumley (15/31)	(United Kingdom) Penny Lumley (16/31)	(United Kingdom) Penny Lumley (17/31)
1999	(Australia) Prue McCahey (1/5)	(United States) Jane Lippincott (4/4)	(United Kingdom) Penny Lumley (18/31)	(United Kingdom) Penny Lumley (19/31)
2000	(Australia) Prue McCahey (2/5)	(United Kingdom) Penny Lumley (20/31)	(United Kingdom) Penny Lumley (21/31)	(United Kingdom) Penny Lumley (22/31)
2001	(Australia) Prue McCahey (3/5)	(United Kingdom) Penny Lumley (23/31)	(United Kingdom) Charlotte Cornwallis (3/22)	(United Kingdom) Penny Lumley (2128)
2002	(Australia) Prue McCahey (4/5)	(United Kingdom) Penny Lumley (24/31)	(United Kingdom) Charlotte Cornwallis (4/22)	(United Kingdom) Penny Lumley (25/31)
2003	(United Kingdom) Penny Lumley (26/31)	(United Kingdom) Penny Lumley (27/31)	(United Kingdom) Penny Lumley (28/31)	(United Kingdom) Charlotte Cornwallis (5/22)
2004	(Australia) Prue McCahey (5/5)	(United Kingdom) Charlotte Cornwallis (6/22)	(United Kingdom) Charlotte Cornwallis (7/22)	(United Kingdom) Penny Lumley (29/31)
2005	(Australia) Kate Leeming (2/5)	(United Kingdom) Charlotte Cornwallis (8/22)	(United Kingdom) Charlotte Cornwallis (9/22)	(United Kingdom) Charlotte Cornwallis (10/22)
2006	(United Kingdom) Charlotte Cornwallis (11/22)	(United Kingdom) Charlotte Cornwallis (12/22)	(United Kingdom) Charlotte Cornwallis (13/22)	(United Kingdom) Charlotte Cornwallis (14/22)
2007	(Australia) Kate Leeming (3/5)	(United Kingdom) Charlotte Cornwallis (15/22)	(United Kingdom) Charlotte Cornwallis (16/22)	(United Kingdom) Charlotte Cornwallis (17/22)
2008	(Australia) Kate Leeming (4/5)	(United Kingdom) Claire Fahey (1/49)	(United Kingdom) Charlotte Cornwallis (18/22)	(United Kingdom) Charlotte Cornwallis (19/22)
2009	(United Kingdom) Charlotte Cornwallis (20/22)	(United Kingdom) Charlotte Cornwallis (21/22) (Note: Between 2009 and 2019 (except 2013) the US Ladies Open for each year was held in the preceding November (i.e. the 2018 event was held in November 2017))	(United Kingdom) Karen Hird (1/1)	(United Kingdom) Charlotte Cornwallis (22/22)
2010	(United Kingdom) Claire Fahey (2/49)	(United Kingdom) Claire Fahey (3/49)	(United Kingdom) Claire Fahey (4/49)	(United Kingdom) Claire Fahey (5/49)
2011	(United Kingdom) Claire Fahey (6/49)	(United Kingdom) Claire Fahey (7/49)	(United Kingdom) Claire Fahey (8/49)	(United Kingdom) Claire Fahey (9/49)
2012	(United Kingdom) Claire Fahey (10/49)	(United Kingdom) Claire Fahey (11/49)	(United Kingdom) Claire Fahey (12/49)	(United Kingdom) Claire Fahey (13/49)
2013	(Australia) Kate Leeming (5/5)	(United Kingdom) Tara Lumley (1/2)	(United Kingdom) Claire Fahey (14/49)	(United Kingdom) Claire Fahey (15/49)
2014	(United Kingdom) Claire Fahey (16/49)	(United Kingdom) Claire Fahey (17/49)	(United Kingdom) Claire Fahey (18/49)	(United Kingdom) Claire Fahey (19/49)
2015	(United Kingdom) Harriet Ingham (1/1)	(United Kingdom) Penny Lumley (30/31)	(United Kingdom) Penny Lumley (31/31)	(United Kingdom) Claire Fahey (20/49)
2016	(United Kingdom) Claire Fahey (21/49)	(Latvia) Irina Dulbish (1/1)	(United Kingdom) Claire Fahey (22/49)	(United Kingdom) Sarah Vigrass (1/1)
2017	(United Kingdom) Claire Fahey (23/49)	(United Kingdom) Claire Fahey (24/49)	(United Kingdom) Claire Fahey (25/49)	(United Kingdom) Claire Fahey (26/49)
2018	(United Kingdom) Claire Fahey (27/49)	(Netherlands) Saskia Bollerman (1/2)	(United Kingdom) Claire Fahey (28/49)	(United Kingdom) Claire Fahey (29/49)
2019	(United Kingdom) Claire Fahey (30/49)	(United Kingdom) Claire Fahey (31/49)	(United Kingdom) Claire Fahey (32/49)	(United Kingdom) Claire Fahey (33/49)
2020	(United Kingdom) Tara Lumley (2/2)	Not held	Not held	Not held
2021	Not held	Not held	Not held	Not held
2022	(Australia) Jo See Tan (1/1)	(United Kingdom) Claire Fahey (34/49)	(United Kingdom) Claire Fahey (35/49)	(United Kingdom) Claire Fahey (36/49)
2023	(Netherlands) Saskia Bollerman (2/2)	(United Kingdom) Claire Fahey (37/49)	(United Kingdom) Claire Fahey (38/49)	(United Kingdom) Claire Fahey (39/49)
2024	(United Kingdom) Claire Fahey (40/49)	(United Kingdom) Claire Fahey (41/49)	(United Kingdom) Claire Fahey (42/49)	(United Kingdom) Claire Fahey (43/49)
2025	(United Kingdom) Claire Fahey (44/49)	(United Kingdom) Claire Fahey (45/49)	(United Kingdom) Claire Fahey (46/49)	(United Kingdom) Claire Fahey (47/49) (April) (United Kingdom) Claire Fahey (48/49) (November)
2026	(United Kingdom) Claire Fahey (49/49)			

== Men's doubles ==
Year	Australian Open	US Open	French Open	British Open
1959	Not held	(United States) Alastair Martin; Robert Grant III	Not held	Not held
1960	Not held	(United States) James Dunn; WI Forbes Jr	Not held	Not held
1961	Not held	(United States) James Dunn; WI Forbes Jr	Not held	Not held
1962	Not held	(United States) James Dunn; WI Forbes Jr	Not held	Not held
1963	Not held	(United States) Alastair Martin (United States) Northrup Knox	Not held	Not held
1964	Not held	(United States) James Dunn (United States) William Vogt	Not held	Not held
1965	Not held	(United States) James Dunn (United States) William Vogt	Not held	Not held
1966	Not held	(United States) James Dunn (United States) William Vogt	Not held	Not held
1967	Not held	(United States) James Dunn (United States) William Vogt	Not held	Not held
1968	Not held	(United States) Pete Bostwick Jr (United States) Jimmy Bostwick	Not held	Not held
1969	Not held	(United States) Pete Bostwick Jr (United States) Jimmy Bostwick	Not held	Not held
1970	Not held	(United States) Pete Bostwick Jr (United States) Jimmy Bostwick	Not held	Not held
1971	Not held	Alastair Martin (United States) Eugene Scott	Not held	(United Kingdom) R Hughes (United Kingdom) Norwood Cripps
1972	Not held	Samuel Howe; Edward Noll	Not held	(United Kingdom) Frank Willis (United Kingdom) C Ennis
1973	Not held	R Jerry Bijur; Luis Dominguez	Not held	(United Kingdom) C J Swallow (United Kingdom) Norwood Cripps
1974	Not held	Samuel Howe (United States) Eugene Scott	Not held	(United Kingdom) C J Swallow (United Kingdom) Norwood Cripps
1975	Not held	JF Sammis III; Roger Tuckerman	Not held	(United Kingdom) C J Swallow (United Kingdom) Norwood Cripps
1976	(Australia) Barry Toates (Australia) Graham Hyland	JF Sammis III; Roger Tuckerman	Not held	(United Kingdom) Frank Willis (United Kingdom) D W Cull
1977	(United Kingdom) Chris Ronaldson (Australia) Lachlan Deuchar	(United Kingdom) Norwood Cripps (United Kingdom) Chris Ronaldson	Not held	(United Kingdom) Alan Lovell (April & December) (United Kingdom) Norwood Cripps (April & December)
1978	(Australia) Colin Lumley (Australia) Gary Simpson	(United States) Odgen Phipps (United States) Eugene Scott	Not held	(United Kingdom) Alan Lovell (United Kingdom) Norwood Cripps
1979	(Australia) Andrew Heard (Australia) Barry Toates	(Australia) Barry Toates (United States) Eugene Scott	Not held	(United Kingdom) Alan Lovell (United Kingdom) Norwood Cripps
1980	(Australia) Wayne Davies (Australia) Lachlan Deuchar	(United States) Odgen Phipps (Australia) Graham Hyland	Not held	(United Kingdom) Alan Lovell (United Kingdom) Norwood Cripps
1981	(Australia) Ted Cockram (Australia) Graham Hyland	(United States) Odgen Phipps (Australia) Graham Hyland	Not held	(United Kingdom) Chris Ronaldson (United Kingdom) Mick Dean
1982	(United States) Odgen Phipps (Australia) Graham Hyland	(United States) Odgen Phipps (Australia) Wayne Davies	Not held	(United Kingdom) Alan Lovell (United Kingdom) Norwood Cripps
1983	(Australia) Graham Hyland; D Collins	(Australia) Barry Toates; Frank Faulderbaum	Not held	(United Kingdom) Chris Ronaldson (United Kingdom) Mick Dean
1984	(Australia) Ted Cockram (Australia) A Cockram	(United Kingdom) Kevin Sheldon (Australia) Lachlan Deuchar	Not held	(Australia) Wayne Davies (Australia) Lachlan Deuchar
1985	(Australia) Ted Cockram (Australia) Graham Hyland	(United States) Peter Clement (United States) James Burke	Not held	(Australia) Wayne Davies (Australia) Lachlan Deuchar
1986	(Australia) Ted Cockram (Australia) Graham Hyland	(United States) Peter deSvastich (Australia) Wayne Davies	Not held	(Australia) Wayne Davies (Australia) Lachlan Deuchar
1987	(Australia) Ted Cockram (Australia) Graham Hyland	(United States) David Collins (Australia) Graham Hyland	Not held	(Australia) Wayne Davies (Australia) Lachlan Deuchar
1988	(Australia) Paul Tabley (Australia) Matthew Hayward	(United States) Peter deSvastich (Australia) Wayne Davies	Not held	(Australia) Wayne Davies (Australia) Lachlan Deuchar
1989	(United Kingdom) Chris Bray (Australia) Jonathan Howell	(United States) Peter deSvastich (Australia) Lachlan Deuchar	Not held	(Australia) Wayne Davies (Australia) Lachlan Deuchar
1990	(United Kingdom) Chris Bray (Australia) Peter Meares	(Australia) Robert Fahey (Australia) Peter Meares	Not held	(Australia) Wayne Davies (Australia) Lachlan Deuchar
1991	(Australia) Wayne Davies (Australia) Barry Toates	(Australia) Wayne Davies (Australia) Lachlan Deuchar	Not held	(United Kingdom) Chris Bray (United Kingdom) Mike Gooding
1992	(Australia) Robert Fahey (United Kingdom) Julian Snow	(Australia) Robert Fahey (United Kingdom) Julian Snow	Not held	(Australia) Wayne Davies (Australia) Lauchlan Deuchar
1993	(Australia) Wayne Davies (United States) Morris Clothier	(Australia) Robert Fahey (United Kingdom) Julian Snow	Not held	(United Kingdom) Chris Bray (United Kingdom) Mike Gooding
1994	(Australia) Robert Fahey (Australia) Peter Meares	(United Kingdom) Chris Bray (United Kingdom) Mike Gooding	Not held	(United Kingdom) Chris Bray (United Kingdom) Mike Gooding
1995	(United Kingdom) Chris Bray (United Kingdom) Mike Gooding	(United Kingdom) Chris Bray (United Kingdom) Mike Gooding	Not held	(Australia) Robert Fahey (Australia) Frank Filippelli
1996	(Australia) Robert Fahey (Australia) Peter Meares	(United Kingdom) Nick Wood (United Kingdom) Julian Snow	(Australia) Frank Filippelli (Australia) Paul Tabley	(United Kingdom) Chris Bray (Australia) Mike Happell
1997	(Australia) Robert Fahey (Australia) Peter Meares	(United Kingdom) James Male (United Kingdom) Julian Snow	(United Kingdom) James Male (United Kingdom) Julian Snow	(United Kingdom) James Male (United Kingdom) Julian Snow
1998	(Australia) Steve Virgona (United Kingdom) Ruaraidh Gunn	(Australia) Steve Virgona (United Kingdom) Ruaraidh Gunn	(Australia) Steve Virgona (United Kingdom) Ruaraidh Gunn	(United Kingdom) James Male (United Kingdom) Julian Snow
1999	(United Kingdom) Chris Bray (Australia) Steve Virgona	(United Kingdom) James Male (United Kingdom) Julian Snow	(Australia) Robert Fahey (United Kingdom) Mike Gooding	(Australia) Steve Virgona (United Kingdom) Ruaraidh Gunn
2000	(Australia) Robert Fahey (Australia) Brad Dale	(United Kingdom) Nick Wood (United Kingdom) Julian Snow	Not held	(United Kingdom) Chris Bray (United Kingdom) Nick Wood
2001	(Australia) Robert Fahey (Australia) Brad Dale	(United Kingdom) Nick Wood (United Kingdom) Chris Bray	Not held	(Australia) Robert Fahey (Australia) Steve Virgona
2002	(Australia) Robert Fahey (Australia) Brad Dale	(United Kingdom) Nick Wood (United Kingdom) Mike Gooding	Not held	(Australia) Robert Fahey (Australia) Steve Virgona
2003	(Australia) Kieran Booth (Australia) Steve Virgona	(United Kingdom) Nick Wood (United Kingdom) Mike Gooding	Not held	(Australia) Robert Fahey (United Kingdom) Ruaraidh Gunn
2004	(Australia) Robert Fahey (United Kingdom) Ruaraidh Gunn	(United States) Tim Chisholm (United States) Morris Clothier	Not held	(United Kingdom) Nick Wood (United Kingdom) Mike Gooding
2005	(Australia) Kieran Booth (Australia) Steve Virgona	(Australia) Robert Fahey (United Kingdom) Ruaraidh Gunn	Not held	(Australia) Robert Fahey (United Kingdom) Ruaraidh Gunn
2006	(Australia) Kieran Booth (Australia) Steve Virgona	(United States) Tim Chisholm (United States) Camden Riviere	(Australia) Robert Fahey (United Kingdom) Ruaraidh Gunn	(Australia) Robert Fahey (United Kingdom) Ruaraidh Gunn
2007	(United Kingdom) Julian Snow (United Kingdom) Nick Wood	(Australia) Robert Fahey (Australia) Steve Virgona	(United States) Camden Riviere (United Kingdom) Nick Wood	(Australia) Robert Fahey (United Kingdom) Ruaraidh Gunn
2008	(Australia) Robert Fahey (United Kingdom) Ruaraidh Gunn	(Australia) Robert Fahey (Australia) Steve Virgona	(United States) Camden Riviere (United Kingdom) Nick Wood	(Australia) Robert Fahey (United Kingdom) James Male
2009	(Australia) Robert Fahey (United Kingdom) Ruaraidh Gunn	(United States) Camden Riviere (United Kingdom) Nick Wood	(Australia) Robert Fahey (Australia) Steve Virgona	(United Kingdom) Nick Wood (Australia) Steve Virgona
2010	(Australia) Robert Fahey (United Kingdom) Ruaraidh Gunn	(United Kingdom) Ben Taylor-Matthews (Australia) Steve Virgona	(Australia) Robert Fahey (Australia) Steve Virgona	(Australia) Robert Fahey (Australia) Steve Virgona
2011	(Australia) Robert Fahey (Australia) Steve Virgona	(Australia) Robert Fahey (Australia) Steve Virgona	(United States) Tim Chisholm (United States) Camden Riviere	(Australia) Robert Fahey (Australia) Steve Virgona
2012	(Australia) Robert Fahey (Australia) Steve Virgona	(United States) Tim Chisholm (Australia) Steve Virgona	(United States) Tim Chisholm (United States) Camden Riviere	(Australia) Robert Fahey (Australia) Steve Virgona
2013	(Australia) Kieran Booth (Australia) Steve Virgona	(United States) Tim Chisholm (United States) Camden Riviere	Not held (Note: The 2013 French Open Doubles was replaced by a Doubles World Championship held at the same venue and at the same time as the 2013 French Open Singles. It was won by Robert Fahey and Steve Virgona 5-4 against Camden Riviere and Tim Chisholm)	(United States) Tim Chisholm (United Kingdom) Bryn Sayers
2014	(Australia) Kieran Booth (United Kingdom) Bryn Sayers	(United States) Tim Chisholm (United States) Camden Riviere	(United States) Tim Chisholm (United States) Camden Riviere	(United States) Tim Chisholm (United States) Camden Riviere
2015	(United Kingdom) Julian Snow (United States) Camden Riviere	(United States) Tim Chisholm (United States) Camden Riviere	(United States) Tim Chisholm (Australia) Robert Fahey	(Australia) Steve Virgona (Australia) Chris Chapman
2016	(Australia) Robert Fahey (Australia) Chris Chapman	(United States) Tim Chisholm (United States) Camden Riviere	(United States) Camden Riviere (United Kingdom) John Lumley	(United States) Tim Chisholm (United States) Camden Riviere
2017	(United States) Tim Chisholm (United States) Camden Riviere	(United States) Tim Chisholm (United States) Camden Riviere	(United States) Tim Chisholm (United States) Camden Riviere	(United States) Tim Chisholm (United States) Camden Riviere
2018	(Australia) Robert Fahey (Australia) Nick Howell	(United States) Tim Chisholm (United States) Camden Riviere	(United Kingdom) John Lumley (United Kingdom) Ben Taylor-Matthews	(Australia) Robert Fahey (Australia) Nick Howell
2019	(United States) Tim Chisholm (United States) Camden Riviere	(United States) Tim Chisholm (United States) Camden Riviere	(United Kingdom) John Lumley (United States) Camden Riviere	(United Kingdom) John Lumley (United States) Camden Riviere
2020	(Australia) Chris Chapman (Australia) Nick Howell	(United States) Tim Chisholm (United States) Camden Riviere	Not held	Not held
2021	Not held	(United States) Tim Chisholm (United States) Camden Riviere	Not held	(Australia) Robert Fahey (Australia) Nick Howell
2022	(United Kingdom) John Lumley (Australia) Kieran Booth	(United States) Tim Chisholm (United States) Camden Riviere	(United Kingdom) John Lumley (United States) Camden Riviere	(United Kingdom) John Lumley (United States) Camden Riviere
2023	(Australia) Chris Chapman (Australia) Nick Howell	(United States) Tim Chisholm (United States) Camden Riviere	(Australia) Steve Virgona (United Kingdom) Ben Taylor-Matthews	(United States) Tim Chisholm (United States) Camden Riviere
2024	(United Kingdom) John Lumley (Australia) Steve Virgona	(United States) Tim Chisholm (United States) Camden Riviere	(United States) Camden Riviere (Australia) Nick Howell	(United States) Tim Chisholm (United States) Camden Riviere
2025	(United States) Camden Riviere (Australia) Chris Chapman	(United States) Camden Riviere (United States) Tim Chisholm	(Australia) Nick Howell (Australia) Steve Virgona	(United Kingdom) John Lumley (United Kingdom) Vaughan Hamilton
2026	(Australia) Nick Howell (Australia) Steve Virgona			

== Ladies doubles ==
Year	Australian Open	US Open	French Open	British Open
1982	Not held	Not held	Not held	Jill Cottrell; Sheila Macintosh
1983	Not held	Not held	Not held	(United Kingdom) Lesley Ronaldson; Gill Dean
1984	Not held	(United Kingdom) Lesley Ronaldson; Maggie Wright	Not held	(United Kingdom) Lesley Ronaldson; Gill Dean
1985	Not held	Julie Talbert; Elizabeth Woodthorpe	Not held	(United Kingdom) Katrina Allen; Sheila Macintosh
1986	Not held	(United Kingdom) Sally Jones; Helen Mursell	(United Kingdom) Katrina Allen; Unknown	(United Kingdom) Lesley Ronaldson; Gill Dean
1987	Not held	Jane Hyland (Australia) Helen Mursell	(United Kingdom) Alex Garside (United Kingdom) Sally Jones	(United Kingdom) Alex Garside (United Kingdom) Sally Jones
1988	Not held	(United States) Jane Lippincott; Katherine Wooley	N/A	(United Kingdom) Alex Garside (United Kingdom) Sally Jones
1989	Not held	(United Kingdom) Alex Garside (United Kingdom) Sally Jones	N/A	(United Kingdom) Alex Garside (United Kingdom) Sally Jones
1990	(Australia) Helen Mursell (Australia) Lisa Galbraith	(United States) Jane Lippincott; Sheila Reilly	(United Kingdom) Alex Garside (United Kingdom) Penny Lumley	(United Kingdom) Alex Garside; Melissa Briggs
1991	(United Kingdom) Alex Garside (United Kingdom) Sally Jones	Catherine Castle; Lissen Thompson	N/A	(United Kingdom) Alex Garside (United Kingdom) Penny Lumley
1992	(Australia) Helen Mursell; M Evans	(United States) Jane Lippincott; Sheila Reilly	N/A	(United Kingdom) Alex Garside (United Kingdom) Sally Jones
1993	J Guest (Australia) Barbara Baker	(United States) Jane Lippincott; Helen Mursell	(United Kingdom) Katrina Allen (France) Bernadette Bidouze	(United Kingdom) Alex Garside (United Kingdom) Sally Jones
1994	(Australia) Karen Toates (Australia) Barbara Baker	Sheila Reilly; Eleanor Douglas	N/A	(United Kingdom) Fiona Deuchar; Mandy Happell
1995	(Australia) Helen Mursell (Australia) Heather Barwick	(United Kingdom) Katrina Allen; Karen Toates	(United Kingdom) Penny Lumely (United Kingdom) Sue Haswell	(United Kingdom) Sally Jones (United Kingdom) Sue Haswell
1996	(Australia) Kate Leeming (Australia) Jo Edwards	(United Kingdom) Sue Haswell; Sheila Reily	N/A	(United Kingdom) Penny Lumley (United Kingdom) Sue Haswell
1997	(United Kingdom) Penny Lumley (United Kingdom) Sue Haswell	(United Kingdom) Penny Lumley (United States) Evelyn David	(United Kingdom) Penny Lumley (United Kingdom) Sue Haswell	(United Kingdom) Penny Lumley (United Kingdom) Sue Haswell
1998	(Australia) Barbara Baker (Australia) Julianne Drewitt	(United Kingdom) Penny Lumley (United Kingdom) Fiona Deuchar	(United Kingdom) Alex Garside (United Kingdom) Sally Jones	(United Kingdom) Sally Jones (United Kingdom) Alex Garside
1999	(Australia) Prue McCahey (Australia) Karen Toates	(United States) Jane Lippincott (United States) Brenda Sabbag	(United Kingdom) Penny Lumley (United Kingdom) Alex Garside	(United Kingdom) Penny Lumley (United Kingdom) Alex Garside
2000	(Australia) Prue McCahey (Australia) Karen Toates	(United Kingdom) Penny Lumley (United States) Evelyn David	(United Kingdom) Penny Lumley (United Kingdom) Alex Garside	(United Kingdom) Penny Lumley (United Kingdom) Joe Iddles
2001	(Australia) Prue McCahey (Australia) Karen Toates	(United Kingdom) Penny Lumley (United Kingdom) Joe Iddles	(United Kingdom) Charlotte Cornwallis (United Kingdom) Alex Garside	(United Kingdom) Penny Lumley (United Kingdom) Joe Iddles
2002	(Australia) Prue McCahey (Australia) Karen Toates	(United Kingdom) Penny Lumley (United States) Evelyn David	(United Kingdom) Penny Lumley (United Kingdom) Joe Iddles	(United Kingdom) Penny Lumley (United Kingdom) Joe Iddles
2003	(United Kingdom) Charlotte Cornwallis (Australia) Kate Leeming	(United Kingdom) Penny Lumley (United States) Evelyn David	N/A	(United Kingdom) Penny Lumley (United Kingdom) Joe Iddles
2004	(Australia) R Snell (Australia) Prue McCahey	(United Kingdom) Charlotte Cornwallis (United States) Alex Garside	N/A	Not held
2005	(Australia) Kate Leeming (Australia) Amy Hayball	(United Kingdom) Charlotte Cornwallis (United States) Melissa Grassi	N/A	(United Kingdom) Charlotte Cornwallis (United Kingdom) Sue Haswell
2006	(United Kingdom) Charlotte Cornwallis (Australia) Kate Leeming	(United Kingdom) Karen Hird (United Kingdom) Charlotte Cornwallis	(United Kingdom) Penny Lumley (United Kingdom) Charlotte Cornwallis	(United Kingdom) Joe Iddles (United States) Frederika Adam
2007	(Australia) Kate Leeming (Australia) Annabel Parolo	(United Kingdom) Karen Hird (United Kingdom) Charlotte Cornwallis	(United Kingdom) Penny Lumley (United Kingdom) Charlotte Cornwallis	(United Kingdom) Penny Lumley (United Kingdom) Charlotte Cornwallis
2008	(Australia) Laura Fowler (Australia) Xanthe Ranger	(United Kingdom) Karen Hird (United Kingdom) Charlotte Cornwallis	(United Kingdom) Karen Hird (United Kingdom) Charlotte Cornwallis	(United Kingdom) Claire Fahey (United Kingdom) Sarah Vigrass
2009	(United Kingdom) Charlotte Cornwallis (Australia) Euahna Varigos	(United Kingdom) Karen Hird (United Kingdom) Charlotte Cornwallis	(United Kingdom) Claire Fahey (United States) Frederika Adam	(United Kingdom) Karen Hird (United Kingdom) Charlotte Cornwallis
2010	(United Kingdom) Claire Fahey (United Kingdom) Sarah Vigrass	(United Kingdom) Claire Fahey (United Kingdom) Aldona Greenwood	(United Kingdom) Claire Fahey (United States) Frederika Adam	(United Kingdom) Karen Hird (United States) Frederika Adam
2011	(United Kingdom) Claire Fahey (United Kingdom) Sarah Vigrass	(United Kingdom) Claire Fahey (United States) Amanda Avedissian	N/A	(United Kingdom) Karen Hird (United States) Frederika Adam
2012	(United Kingdom) Claire Fahey (United Kingdom) Sarah Vigrass	(United Kingdom) Claire Fahey (United Kingdom) Alex Brodie	(United Kingdom) Claire Fahey (United Kingdom) Alex Brodie	(United Kingdom) Claire Fahey (United Kingdom) Sarah Vigrass
2013	(Australia) Kate Leeming (Australia) Amy Hayball	(United Kingdom) Karen Hird (United States) Frederika Adam	(United Kingdom) Claire Fahey (United Kingdom) Alex Brodie	(United Kingdom) Claire Fahey (United Kingdom) Sarah Vigrass
2014	(United Kingdom) Claire Fahey (United Kingdom) Alex Brodie	(United Kingdom) Claire Fahey (United States) Amanda Avedissian	(United Kingdom) Claire Fahey (Latvia) Irina Dulbish	(United Kingdom) Claire Fahey (United Kingdom) Sarah Vigrass
2015	(United Kingdom) Harriett Ingham (Australia) Jo Edwards	(United Kingdom) Tara Lumley (United Kingdom) Penny Lumley	(United States) Frederika Adam (Latvia) Irina Dulbish	(United Kingdom) Claire Fahey (United Kingdom) Sarah Vigrass
2016	(United Kingdom) Claire Fahey (Netherlands) Saskia Bollerman	(United States) Frederika Adam (Latvia) Irina Dulbish	(United Kingdom) Claire Fahey (United Kingdom) Isabel Candy	(United States) Frederika Adam (Latvia) Irina Dulbish
2017	(United Kingdom) Claire Fahey (Netherlands) Saskia Bollerman	(United Kingdom) Claire Fahey (United States) Kim Kilgore	(United Kingdom) Claire Fahey (Netherlands) Saskia Bollerman	(United Kingdom) Claire Fahey (United Kingdom) Sarah Vigrass
2018	(United Kingdom) Claire Fahey (Netherlands) Saskia Bollerman	(United Kingdom) Tara Lumley (Netherlands) Saskia Bollerman	(United Kingdom) Claire Fahey (United Kingdom) Nicola Doble	(United Kingdom) Claire Fahey (United Kingdom) Sarah Vigrass
2019	(United Kingdom) Claire Fahey (United Kingdom) Tara Lumley	(United Kingdom) Claire Fahey (United Kingdom) Tara Lumley	(United Kingdom) Claire Fahey (United Kingdom) Tara Lumley	(United Kingdom) Claire Fahey (United Kingdom) Sarah Vigrass
2020	(United Kingdom) Tara Lumley (United Kingdom) Penny Lumley	Not held	Not held	Not held
2021	Not held	Not held	Not held	Not held
2022	Not held	(United Kingdom) Claire Fahey (United States) Frederika Adam	(France) Lea van der Zwalmen (Netherlands) Saskia Bollerman	(United Kingdom) Claire Fahey (United Kingdom) Sarah Vigrass
2023	(Netherlands) Saskia Bollerman (Australia) Jo See Tan	(United Kingdom) Claire Fahey (United Kingdom) Penny Lumley	(United Kingdom) Claire Fahey (United Kingdom) Tara Lumley	(United Kingdom) Claire Fahey (United Kingdom) Tara Lumley
2024	(United Kingdom) Claire Fahey (United Kingdom) Tara Lumley	(United Kingdom) Claire Fahey (United Kingdom) Alex Brodie	(United Kingdom) Claire Fahey (Netherlands) Saskia Bollerman	(United Kingdom) Claire Fahey (United Kingdom) Sarah Vigrass
2025	(United Kingdom) Claire Fahey (Netherlands) Saskia Bollerman	(France) Lea Van Der Zwalmen (United States) Annie Clark	(United Kingdom) Claire Fahey (United Kingdom) Jess Garside	(United Kingdom) Claire Fahey (April) (United Kingdom) Tara Lumley (April) (United Kingdom) Claire Fahey (November) (United Kingdom) Tara Lumley (November)
2026	(United Kingdom) Claire Fahey (Netherlands) Saskia Bollerman			

== See also ==
- List of real tennis world champions

== Notes ==
Legend
Player won all 4 Grand Slam tournaments in the same year
Player won 3 Grand Slam tournaments in the same year
Player won 2 Grand Slam tournaments in the same year
