= Tara Lumley =

British real tennis and rackets player

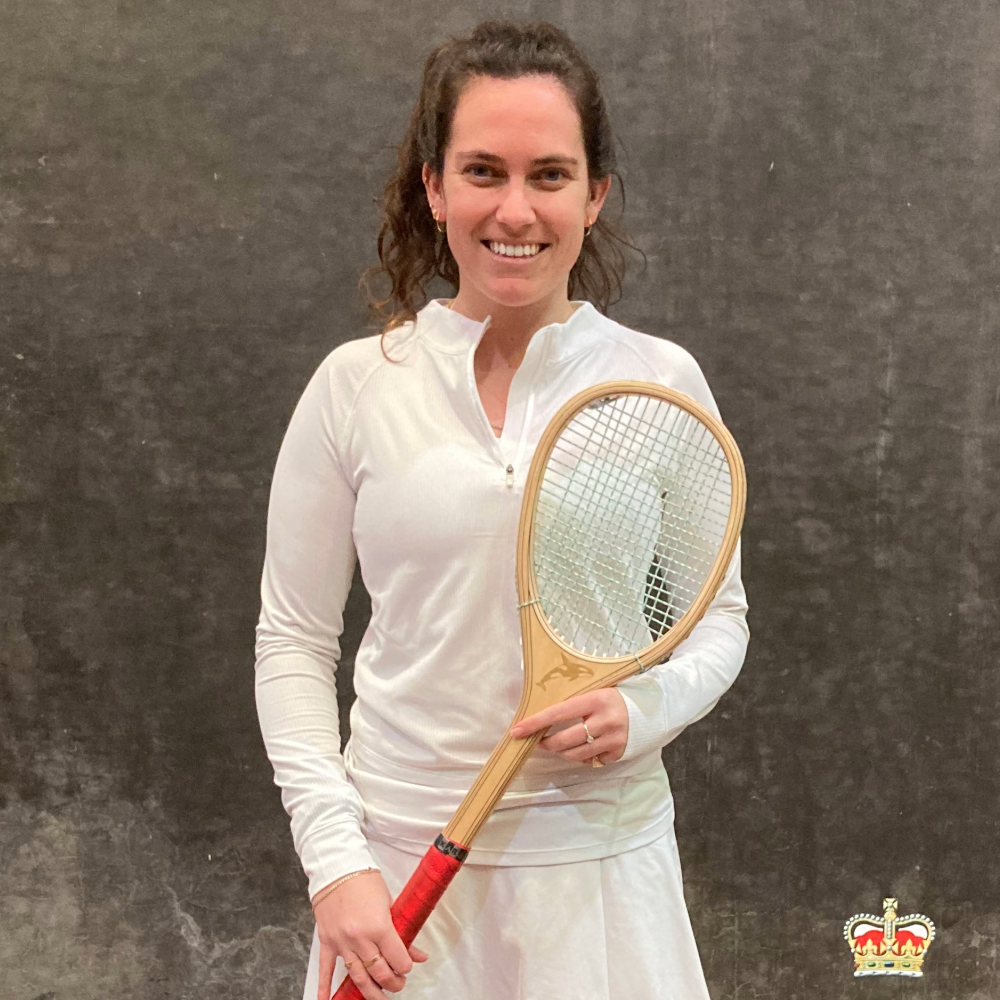
- Tara Lumley at the 2023 British Open
- Full name: Tara Lumley
- Country (sports): United Kingdom
- Residence: United Kingdom
- Born: 10 August 1994 (age 31)
- Plays: Right-handed

World Championships
- Ladies Singles: SF (2019, 2022, 2023)
- Ladies Doubles: W (2019, 2023)

Singles
- Career titles: 2
- Highest ranking: 3
- Current ranking: 4

Grand Slam singles results
- Australian Open: W (2020)
- British Open: F (2022, 2023)
- French Open: F (2019)
- US Open: W (2013)

Doubles
- Career titles: 9
- Highest ranking: 3
- Current ranking: 4

Grand Slam doubles results
- Australian Open: W (2019, 2020, 2024)
- French Open: W (2019, 2023)
- British Open: W (2023)
- US Open: W (2017)

Tara Lumley (born 10 August 1994) is a British real tennis and rackets player and current women's World Doubles Champion. She is currently ranked world number 3 in both singles and doubles at real tennis. She holds two Open singles and seven Open doubles titles. She won the inaugural women's doubles Rackets World Championship with India Deakin, and has challenged for the women's singles Rackets World Championships on three occasions, playing in the eliminator process in each occasion.

== Career ==
=== Real tennis ===
Tara Lumley started playing real tennis as a junior at Holyport Real Tennis Club alongside her older brother John Lumley. Her mother, Penny Lumley is a six-time Ladies Real Tennis World Championship and 28-time Open Champion and her father Colin Lumley worked as a real tennis professional and won two Australian Opens. John would go on to challenge for the 2023 Real Tennis World Championship and become a real tennis professional at the Racquet Club of Philadelphia. Lumley attended the University of Bristol, graduating in 2015.

As a junior, Lumley participated in the British Junior Open, winning the girl's editions in 2009, 2011 and 2012 as well as competing in the boys competitions. She entered her first British Open in 2011, losing her first match to two time Open winner Alex Garside, but winning the plate tournament. At her second entry in 2011, she reached the semi final of the doubles draw, partnering with her mother Penny Lumley, and winning the plate competition for a second time. Lumley and her mother participated internationally for the first time at the 2013 Ladies World Championship in Paris, where they reached the final, losing to the Vigrass sisters of Claire Fahey and Sarah Vigrass. Lumley's breakthrough singles result was at the 2013 US Open in Tuxedo. Having defeated Frederika Adam in the semi final, she upset first seed Karen Hird in three sets to win her first Open title aged 18.

Having missed the early year tournaments in 2014, Lumley returned to the US Open, losing the singles to her mother Penny Lumley while reaching the final of the French Open to Claire Fahey. After a first semi final at the British Open in April 2015, she followed up a week later at the 2015 Ladies World Championships in Leamington by again reaching the final alongside her mother in a rematch of the 2013 final against Fahey and Vigrass. In the singles draw, she reached the quarter final stage, losing to eventual champion Fahey.

Lumley debuted at the Australian Open in January 2016 at the Royal Melbourne Tennis Club, reaching the final on her first attempt against Fahey and Saskia Bollerman. She competed at all four Opens for the first time in 2016, with her best result at the US Open where she reached the final of both competitions, losing both to Fahey (partnered in the doubles with Kim Kilgore). Lumley missed the 2017 Australian Open, and lost her first match at the 2017 British Open to Bollerman, going on to win the plate competition for a third time. A month later, Lumley made her first appearance at the World Championships at Tuxedo. Lumley won her first singles match comfortably, but again ran in to Fahey at the quarter final stage. It was her worst performance in the doubles as well, bowing out in the semi final to Bollerman and Amanda Avedissian in a tight three set match.

In late 2017, Lumley started a new doubles partnership with Saskia Bollerman. They competed together for the first time at the 2017 US Open, winning in the final against Xanthe Ranger and Isabel Candy. Lumley lost the final of the singles competition to Bollerman despite a close first set. Lumley and Bollerman first competed against Fahey and Vigrass at the 2018 British Open, but still could not overcome the world champions. Bollerman took a break from the game at the end of the season, leaving Lumley looking for a new partner.

After losing a close semi final of the 2018 French Open with Irina Dulbish against Jess Garside and Lea van der Zwalmen, Lumley joined incumbent World Champion Claire Fahey in a new doubles partnership at the US Open. Lumley reached her sixth US Open singles final, still unable to replicate her initial victory, but won the doubles with Fahey. Lumley returned to the Australian Open in 2019, winning the doubles with Fahey but losing to her again in the singles. She remained in Australia for the 2019 World Championships at Ballarat. Playing with Fahey, she won the doubles World Championship for the first time against her mother and Kate Leeming in straight sets. In the singles, she had her best result to date, losing a very tight semi final against Isabel Candy. Still partnered with Fahey, she also won her first French Open Doubles title in 2019, also against her mother.

At the start of 2020, Lumley won her first Australian Open singles title, comfortably beating Kate Leeming in the final. However, the COVID-19 pandemic cancelled all tournaments for the remainder of 2020 and all of 2021. Lumley returned to competitive tennis in early 2022 at the British Open, reaching her first British Open singles final. Days later, she played the 2022 World Championship in Fontainebleau. With Fahey playing with her sister again, Lumley partnered Jess Garside, but once again lost to the Vigrass sisters in the semi final. Lumley lost the singles semi final to local favourite Lea van der Zwalmen. Later that season, Lumley represented Great Britain against Rest of the World in the inaugural women's Bathurst Cup at Lord's Cricket Ground. Lumley won all four of her matches, defeating both Saskia Bollerman and Frederika Adam in the singles as Great Britain won all but one match in the fixture.

2023 echoed the previous year for Lumley, reaching a second consecutive British Open final, whilst losing the singles semi final to van der Zwalmen at the 2023 World Championship. However, Lumley partnered Fahey again for both tournaments, winning her first British Open doubles title and her second World Championship doubles title. Later in the year, the two combined again for her second French Open doubles title.

In 2024, Lumley again competed for Great Britain at the Bathurst Cup, this time at the Royal Melbourne Tennis Club. She beat Saskia Bollerman in her singles rubber, but lost to Lea van der Zwalmen. The match went to a deciding doubles match, where Lumley and Georgie Willis lost to van der Zwalmen and Bollerman. At the subsequent Australian Open in Hobart, Lumley won her third doubles title, again partnering Fahey.

=== Rackets ===
Lumley began playing rackets at the Queen's Club alongside her real tennis. She entered her first British Open Rackets in 2018, reaching the quarter final stage before losing to incumbent World Champion Lea van der Zwalmen. She participated in the round robin stage of the 2019 World Championship eliminator, which was ultimately won by Georgie Willis.

She reached won her first British Open Rackets title in 2020 where she beat India Deakin 3 games to 2. She won at the inaugural women's doubles Rackets World Championship at Wellington College with Deakin in February, beating singles champion Lea van der Zwalmen and Luisa Gengler-Saint in the final 3 games to 1, two of the games going to a set. Her performance earned her the Lillibet Bowl by the Tennis and Rackets Association for the best performance in women's rackets in 2020. After the 2021 event was cancelled due to the COVID-19 pandemic, she could not defend her title in 2022, losing to Georgie Willis in the semi final. She again entered the World Championship, but could not progress from the round robin stage. Another run of two semi-final placings, both to Claire Fahey, followed in 2023 and 2024. In 2024 she also lost her first round eliminator at the World Championship.

== Performance timeline ==
=== Women's singles ===
Key
W	F	SF	QF	#R	RR	Q#	DNQ	A	NH

(W) winner; (F) finalist; (SF) semifinalist; (QF) quarterfinalist; (#R) rounds 4, 3, 2, 1; (RR) round-robin stage; (Q#) qualification round; (DNQ) did not qualify; (A) absent; (NH) not held; (SR) strike rate (events won / competed); (W–L) win–loss record.
To avoid confusion and double counting, these charts are updated at the conclusion of a tournament or when the player's participation has ended.

Current through the 2024 French Ladies Open

Tournament	2011	2012	2013	2014	2015	2016	2017	2018	2019	2020	2021	2022	2023	2024	SR	W–L	Win %
World Championship
World Championship	NH	A	QF	A	QF	A	QF	A	SF	NH		SF	SF	NH	0 / 6	9–6	60%
Win–loss	0–0	0–0	1–1	0–0	2–1	0–0	1–1	0–0	1–1	0–0	0–0	2–1	2–1	0–0	0 / 6	9–6	60%
Grand Slam tournaments
Australian Ladies Open	NH	A	A	A	A	SF	A	A	F	W	NH	A	A	SF	1 / 4	5–3	63%
British Ladies Open	1R	2R	QF	A	SF	QF	QF	QF	SF	NH		F	F	SF	0 / 11	13–12	52%
French Ladies Open	A	A	NH	F	SF	QF	SF	SF	F	NH		A	SF	A	0 / 7	8–7	53%
US Ladies Open	A	NH	W	F	A	F	F	F	F	NH		A	A	A	1 / 6	12–4	75%
Win–loss	0–1	0–1	5–2	4–2	3–2	4–4	3–3	3–3	5–3	2–0	0–0	2–1	4–2	3–2	2 / 28	38–26	59%
Career Statistics
	2011	2012	2013	2014	2015	2016	2017	2018	2019	2020	2021	2022	2023	2024	Career		
Tournaments	1	1	3	2	3	4	4	3	5	1	0	2	3	2	Career total: 34		
Titles	0	0	1	0	0	0	0	0	0	1	0	0	0	0	Career total: 2		
Finals	0	0	1	2	0	1	1	1	2	1	0	1	1	0	Career total: 11		
Overall win–loss	0–1	0–1	6–3	4–2	5–3	4–4	4–4	3–3	6–4	2–0	0–0	4–2	6–3	3–2	47–32		59%
Win %	0%	0%	67%	67%	63%	50%	50%	50%	60%	100%	–	67%	67%	60%	Career total: 59%		

=== Women's doubles ===
Tournament	2011	2012	2013	2014	2015	2016	2017	2018	2019	2020	2021	2022	2023	2024	SR	W–L	Win %
World Championship
World Championship	A	NH	F	NH	F	NH	SF	NH	W	NH		SF	W	NH	2 / 6	10–4	71%
Win–loss	0–0	0–0	0–1	0–0	2–1	0–0	1–1	0–0	2–0	0–0	0–0	1–1	4–0	0–0	2 / 6	10–4	71%
Grand Slam tournaments
Australian Ladies Open	NH			A	A	F	A	A	W	W	NH		A	W	3 / 4	7–1	88%
British Ladies Open	QF	SF	SF	NH	SF	SF	F	F	SF	NH		F	W	F	1 / 11	16–10	62%
French Ladies Open	NH	A	NH	F	F	A	SF	SF	W	NH		A	W	A	2 / 6	6–4	60%
US Ladies Open	A	NH	F	F	A	F	W	F	NH			A	A	A	1 / 5	7–2	78%
Win–loss	1–1	2–1	3–2	2–1	3–2	3–3	4–2	3–2	4–1	2–0	0–0	2–1	4–0	3–1	7 / 26	36–17	68%
Career Statistics
	2011	2012	2013	2014	2015	2016	2017	2018	2019	2020	2021	2022	2023	2024	Career		
Tournaments	1	1	3	2	3	3	4	3	4	1	0	2	3	2	Career total: 32		
Titles	0	0	0	0	0	0	1	0	3	1	0	0	3	1	Career total: 9		
Finals	0	0	2	1	2	2	2	1	3	1	0	1	3	2	Career total: 20		
Overall win–loss	1–1	2–1	3–3	2–1	5–3	3–3	5–3	3–2	6–1	2–0	0–0	3–2	8–0	3–1	46–21		69%
Win %	50%	67%	50%	67%	63%	50%	63%	60%	86%	100%	–	60%	100%	75%	Career total: 69%		
