= Claire Fahey =

British real tennis player

- Full name: Claire Fahey
- Country (sports): United Kingdom
- Residence: United Kingdom
- Born: 19 June 1991 (age 35)
- Plays: Right-handed

World Championships
- Ladies Singles: W (2011, 2013, 2015, 2017, 2019, 2022, 2023, 2025)
- Ladies Doubles: W (2011, 2013, 2015, 2017, 2019, 2022, 2023, 2025)

Singles
- Career titles: 45
- Highest ranking: 1
- Current ranking: Ladies: 1 Open: 25

Grand Slam singles results
- Australian Open: Ladies: W (2010, 2011, 2012, 2014, 2016, 2017, 2018, 2019, 2024, 2025); Open: QF (2024)
- British Open: Ladies: W (2010, 2011, 2012, 2013, 2014, 2015, 2017, 2018, 2019, 2022, 2023, 2024); Open: R2 (2014, 2019, 2024)
- French Open: Ladies: W (2010, 2012, 2013, 2013, 2016, 2017, 2018, 2019, 2022, 2023, 2024)
- US Open: Ladies: W (2008, 2010, 2011, 2012, 2014, 2017, 2019, 2022, 2023, 2024, 2025); Open: R2 (2015)

Doubles
- Career titles: 39
- Highest ranking: 1
- Current ranking: Ladies: 1 Open: 25

Grand Slam doubles results
- Australian Open: Ladies: W (2010, 2011, 2012, 2014, 2016, 2017, 2018, 2019, 2024, 2025); Open: SF (2024)
- French Open: Ladies: W (2012, 2014, 2017, 2018 2019, 2023, 2024)
- British Open: Ladies: W (2008, 2012, 2013, 2014, 2015, 2017, 2018, 2019, 2022, 2023, 2024); Open: QF (2023)
- US Open: Ladies: W (2010, 2011, 2012, 2014, 2017, 2019, 2022, 2023, 2024); Open: SF (2015)

Claire Fahey née Vigrass (born 19 June 1991) is a British real tennis and rackets player and current real tennis Ladies World Champion and Ladies Rackets World Champion. She holds over 40 Open singles titles and has completed a calendar year Grand Slam on six occasions. She is the first female player to play in the main draw of three of the four Men's Opens, and the first to female player to reach a semi final stage. She has also challenged for the Rackets World Championships on three occasions, winning the World Championship in 2026, and has won five British Open Rackets titles. In 2025, she defended her World Championship titles in both singles and doubles.

== Career ==
=== Real tennis ===
Claire Fahey began playing real tennis at Prested Hall in Feering, Essex alongside her elder sister Sarah Vigrass. In her junior career, she won the British Open Junior Under 16 girl's competition at age 11 and again at age 14. Even on the junior circuit, she played in the boys competitions including reaching the final of the British Open Junior Under 16 competition against future professional Conor Medlow. Her first international competition was the 2005 Ladies World Championship in Paris, where she lost in the first round to eventual winner Charlotte Cornwallis. A year later, Fahey made her Ladies Open debut at the 2006 French Open, aged 15 losing in the first round to Frederika Adam. She played in the 2007 Ladies World Championship in Manchester, this time reaching the second round and falling to professional Kate Leeming.

Fahey won her first Open title at the 2008 US Ladies Open in Aiken, where she defeated Sue Haswell in the final in three sets. Her loss to Karen Hird in the 2009 French Ladies Open final would be the last time she lost a set or a match in a competitive women's fixture in over one and a half decades. By the time she graduated out of the junior ranks, she began competing at minor Men's Open and Amateur tournaments including the MCC Silver Racquet, the Seacourt Silver Racquet and the Category B Championships at Cambridge. Notably, she won the 2010 British U21's Open at Middlesex University and the 2010 Prested Cup U20's against male competition. Also in 2010, she completed her first Grand Slam by winning all four Ladies Open championships becoming the second female to do so after Charlotte Cornwallis in 2006. She competed in her first IRTPA sanctioned Men's event at the 2010 IRTPA Championships becoming the first female player to do so (Cornwallis had previously entered but failed to progress past qualifying). She lost in the first round against Steve Virgona.

Fahey turned professional in 2011 after competing in the British Amateur and MCC Silver Racquet Men's events. She worked as a professional at the Prested Tennis Club before moving to the Holyport Real Tennis Club in 2014. In 2011, she would win the Ladies World Championship for the first time in Melbourne. She continued her unbeaten run through 2012, earning her second career Grand Slam, going on to her defend her second Ladies World Championship at Paris in 2013 against her sister Sarah.

In 2014, Fahey became the first female player to enter and play in a Men's Open Championships, competing at the 2014 British Open at Queen's Club. She quickly became the first female to win a match at a Men's Open Championship, defeating amateur Mark Mathias in the first round, before losing to Ben Taylor-Matthews in the second round. The following year, she competed for the first time in the Men's US Open Championships at Boston, again defeating her first round opponent Leon Smart before losing to Chris Chapman in the second round. Due to a walkovers in the quarter final, she became the first female player to play in a Men's Open Semi Final in the doubles competition with her partner Matthew Ronaldson. In late 2015, she made the finals of two separate Men's competitions: the US Professional Singles Satellite in Newport and the IRTPA Satellite in Holyport. She also defended her Ladies World Championship for the third time at Leamington, again against her sister Sarah.

Fahey took a break from the game at the end of 2015 through the start of 2016 due to her pregnancy, moving back to Prested Tennis Club with her husband Robert Fahey. In 2017, Claire Fahey became the first player, male or female, to win all four singles Opens, all four Doubles Opens, the singles Ladies World Championship and doubles World Championship in the same calendar year (Camden Riviere also achieved this feat in 2017 whilst holding the singles title he won in 2016). Fahey would repeat the same feat in 2019, while Riviere lost his singles title in 2018. Fahey defended her 2017 Ladies World Championship in Tuxedo and her 2019 title in Ballarat.

Fahey did not play any competitive real tennis in 2020 due to the COVID-19 pandemic whilst also dealing with a lupus diagnosis. Her and her husband moved to take up positions revitalising the club at The Oratory School in Woodcote, Berkshire – Rob taking up the Head Professional position at the club while Claire began working as Head of Racquets teaching at the school. She returned to play at the 2021 Men's British Open, but did not progress past the first round. In 2022, she successfully defended her World Championship title at Fontainebleau against new challenger and rackets World Champion Lea van der Zwalmen. Her sixth World Championship victory equalled the record previously held by Penny Lumley. However, at the 2022 French Open, Fahey lost a competitive women's doubles match for the first time in 13 years, losing the final to Lea van der Zwalmen and Saskia Bollerman in straight sets. The following year, another world championship was held, this time at Fahey's home court at The Oratory School, which she again defended against van der Zwalmen.

At the 2024 Australian Open in Melbourne, playing with her husband Robert, she became the first female to win through to a semi final at a Men's Open (having only previously done so due to withdrawals in earlier rounds). She also attended and won all four Opens for the first time since 2019, completing a sixth calendar year grand slam.

Her form continued into 2025, winning the singles and doubles at the Australian Open. However, the US Open doubles marked her second defeat in Open competitions since 2011, losing the final to Van Der Zwalmen and Annie Clark.

=== Rackets ===
Fahey competed in the inaugural British Ladies Open Rackets event in 2011 at the Queen's Club, winning against Barbara Vintcent 3-0. She competed in the burgeoning women's rackets scene for four years, and was undefeated in the sport going into the first Ladies Rackets World Championship in 2015. However, in the final she lost to Lea van der Zwalmen and subsequently retired from competitive rackets, owing to the difficulty of accessing courts and her newborn children. In 2023, Fahey returned to rackets, winning the 2023 Ladies British Open in the absence of van der Zwalmen, who had since moved to Bordeaux. With Tara Lumley, she unsuccessfully challenged van der Zwalmen and Cesca Sweet for the 2023 Doubles World Championship. 2024 saw her first loss in an Open Competition, losing to Georgie Willis in the 2024 Ladies British Open. Also in 2024, she earned the right to challenge van der Zwalmen for the World Championship title, having defeated Tara Lumley and Georgie Willis in the Eliminators. Despite earning an early 2-0 lead, Fahey was unsuccessful in her challenge, ultimately losing the match 2-3. In 2025, she lost the British Open for the first time to Cesca Sweet. Fahey had her most successful Rackets season in 2026. She won back the British Open title against Sweet whilst also winning the Ladies Open British Doubles Championship with Tara Lumley. Fahey also captured the Ladies Rackets World Championship defeating Cesca Sweet 4 sets to 0. In doing so she became the first female to win both the Ladies Real Tennis and Rackets World Championships and the first, male or female, to hold both simultaneously since Peter Latham (1895-1902).

== Personal life ==
Fahey has a twin sister Jenny and is married to fellow real tennis player Robert Fahey and they have two children.

== Performance timeline ==
=== Women's singles ===
Key
| W | F | SF | QF | #R | RR | Q# | DNQ | A | NH |

(W) winner; (F) finalist; (SF) semifinalist; (QF) quarterfinalist; (#R) rounds 4, 3, 2, 1; (RR) round-robin stage; (Q#) qualification round; (DNQ) did not qualify; (A) absent; (NH) not held; (SR) strike rate (events won / competed); (W–L) win–loss record.
To avoid confusion and double counting, these charts are updated at the conclusion of a tournament or when the player's participation has ended.

Current through the 2025 Ladies World Championship

| Tournament | 2005 | 2006 | 2007 | 2008 | 2009 | 2010 | 2011 | 2012 | 2013 | 2014 | 2015 | 2016 | 2017 | 2018 | 2019 | 2020 | 2021 | 2022 | 2023 | 2024 | 2025 | SR | W–L | Win % |
|---|---|---|---|---|---|---|---|---|---|---|---|---|---|---|---|---|---|---|---|---|---|---|---|---|
World Championship
| World Championship | 1R | A | 2R | A | NH | A | W | A | W | A | W | A | W | A | W | NH | | W | W | NH | W | 8 / 10 | 26–2 | 93% |
| Win–loss | 0–1 | 0–0 | 1–1 | 0–0 | 0–0 | 0–0 | 2–0 | 0–0 | 4–0 | 0–0 | 5–0 | 0–0 | 4–0 | 0–0 | 2–0 | 0–0 | 0–0 | 3–0 | 4–0 | 0–0 | 1–0 | 8 / 10 | 26–2 | 93% |
Grand Slam tournaments
| Australian Open | A | A | A | A | A | W | NH | W | A | W | A | W | W | W | W | A | NH | A | A | W | W | 9 / 9 | 23–0 | 100% |
| British Open | A | A | A | F | SF | W | W | W | W | W | W | A | W | W | W | NH | | W | W | W | W | 13 / 15 | 33–2 | 94% |
| French Open | A | QF | SF | SF | F | W | W | W | W | W | A | W | W | W | W | NH | | W | W | W | | 12 / 16 | 29–4 | 88% |
| US Open | A | A | A | W | A | W | W | W | A | W | A | A | W | A | W | NH | | W | W | W | W | 11 / 11 | 25–0 | 100% |
| Win–loss | 0–0 | 0–1 | 1–1 | 4–2 | 2–2 | 10–0 | 7–0 | 9–0 | 4–0 | 8–0 | 2–0 | 6–0 | 11–0 | 8–0 | 9–0 | 0–0 | 0–0 | 6–0 | 7–0 | 9–0 | 7–0 | 45 / 51 | 110–6 | 95% |
IRTPA Sanctioned Tournaments
| Win–loss | 0–0 | 0–0 | 0–0 | 0–0 | 0–0 | 0–0 | 0–0 | 0–0 | 0–0 | 0–0 | 0–0 | 0–0 | 0–0 | 0–0 | 0–0 | 0–0 | 0–0 | 0–0 | 0–0 | 0–0 | 0–0 | 0 / 0 | 0–0 | – |
Career Statistics
| | 2005 | 2006 | 2007 | 2008 | 2009 | 2010 | 2011 | 2012 | 2013 | 2014 | 2015 | 2016 | 2017 | 2018 | 2019 | 2020 | 2021 | 2022 | 2023 | 2024 | 2025 | Career | | |
| Tournaments | 1 | 1 | 2 | 3 | 2 | 4 | 4 | 4 | 3 | 4 | 2 | 2 | 5 | 3 | 5 | 0 | 0 | 4 | 4 | 4 | 4 | Career total: 61 | | |
| Titles | 0 | 0 | 0 | 1 | 0 | 4 | 4 | 4 | 3 | 4 | 2 | 2 | 5 | 3 | 5 | 0 | 0 | 4 | 4 | 4 | 4 | Career total: 53 | | |
| Finals | 0 | 0 | 0 | 2 | 1 | 4 | 4 | 4 | 3 | 4 | 2 | 2 | 5 | 3 | 5 | 0 | 0 | 4 | 4 | 4 | 4 | Career total: 55 | | |
| Overall win–loss | 0–1 | 0–1 | 2–2 | 4–2 | 2–2 | 10–0 | 9–0 | 9–0 | 8–0 | 8–0 | 7–0 | 6–0 | 15–0 | 8–0 | 11–0 | 0–0 | 0–0 | 9–0 | 11–0 | 9–0 | 8–0 | 136–8 | | 94% |
| Win % | 0% | 0% | 50% | 67% | 50% | 100% | 100% | 100% | 100% | 100% | 100% | 100% | 100% | 100% | 100% | – | – | 100% | 100% | 100% | 100% | Career total: 94% | | |

=== Open singles ===
| Tournament | 2010 | 2011 | 2012 | 2013 | 2014 | 2015 | 2016 | 2017 | 2018 | 2019 | 2020 | 2021 | 2022 | 2023 | 2024 | 2025 | SR | W–L | Win % |
|---|---|---|---|---|---|---|---|---|---|---|---|---|---|---|---|---|---|---|---|
World Championship
| Win–loss | 0–0 | 0–0 | 0–0 | 0–0 | 0–0 | 0–0 | 0–0 | 0–0 | 0–0 | 0–0 | 0–0 | 0–0 | 0–0 | 0–0 | 0–0 | 0–0 | 0 / 0 | 0–0 | – |
Grand Slam tournaments
| Australian Open | A | A | A | A | A | A | A | 1R | 1R | 1R | A | NH | A | A | QF | 1R | 0 / 5 | 1–5 | 17% |
| British Open | A | A | A | A | 2R | A | A | 1R | A | 2R | NH | 1R | 1R | 1R | 2R | | 0 / 7 | 3–7 | 30% |
| US Open | A | A | A | A | A | 2R | A | A | A | A | A | A | A | A | A | A | 0 / 1 | 1–1 | 50% |
| Win–loss | 0–0 | 0–0 | 0–0 | 0–0 | 1–1 | 1–1 | 0–0 | 0–2 | 0–1 | 1–2 | 0–0 | 0–1 | 0–1 | 0–1 | 2–2 | 0–1 | 0 / 13 | 5–13 | 28% |
IRTPA Sanctioned Tournaments
| European Open | NH | A | A | A | NH | Q1 | NH | | | | | | | | | NH | 0 / 0 | 0–0 | – |
| IRTPA Championship | 1R | A | Q1 | 1R | A | QF | NH | 1R | 1R | 1R | NH | | | | | | 0 / 6 | 0–6 | 0% |
| US Pro | A | Q1 | A | Q1 | A | 1R | Q1 | Q1 | A | A | NH | A | A | A | A | A | 0 / 1 | 0–1 | 0% |
| Win–loss | 0–1 | 0–0 | 0–0 | 0–1 | 0–0 | 0–2 | 0–0 | 0–1 | 0–1 | 0–1 | 0–0 | 0–0 | 0–0 | 0–0 | 0–0 | 0–0 | 0 / 7 | 0–7 | 0% |
Career Statistics
| | 2010 | 2011 | 2012 | 2013 | 2014 | 2015 | 2016 | 2017 | 2018 | 2019 | 2020 | 2021 | 2022 | 2023 | 2024 | 2025 | Career | | |
| Tournaments | 1 | 0 | 0 | 1 | 1 | 3 | 0 | 3 | 2 | 3 | 0 | 1 | 1 | 1 | 2 | 1 | Career total: 20 | | |
| Titles | 0 | 0 | 0 | 0 | 0 | 0 | 0 | 0 | 0 | 0 | 0 | 0 | 0 | 0 | 0 | 0 | Career total: 0 | | |
| Finals | 0 | 0 | 0 | 0 | 0 | 0 | 0 | 0 | 0 | 0 | 0 | 0 | 0 | 0 | 0 | 0 | Career total: 0 | | |
| Overall win–loss | 0–1 | 0–0 | 0–0 | 0–1 | 1–1 | 1–3 | 0–0 | 0–3 | 0–2 | 1–3 | 0–0 | 0–1 | 0–1 | 0–1 | 2–2 | 0–1 | 5–20 | | 20% |
| Win % | 0% | – | – | 0% | 50% | 25% | – | 0% | 0% | 25% | – | 0% | 0% | 0% | 50% | 0% | Career total: 20% | | |

=== Women's doubles ===
| Tournament | 2006 | 2007 | 2008 | 2009 | 2010 | 2011 | 2012 | 2013 | 2014 | 2015 | 2016 | 2017 | 2018 | 2019 | 2020 | 2021 | 2022 | 2023 | 2024 | 2025 | SR | W–L | Win % |
|---|---|---|---|---|---|---|---|---|---|---|---|---|---|---|---|---|---|---|---|---|---|---|---|
World Championship
| World Championship | NH | F | NH | A | NH | A | NH | W | NH | W | NH | W | NH | W | NH | | W | W | A | W | 7 / 8 | 22–1 | 96% |
| Win–loss | 0–0 | 1–1 | 0–0 | 0–0 | 0–0 | 0–0 | 0–0 | 4–0 | 0–0 | 4–0 | 0–0 | 3–0 | 0–0 | 2–0 | 0–0 | 0–0 | 2–0 | 4–0 | 0–0 | 2–0 | 7 / 8 | 22–1 | 96% |
Grand Slam tournaments
| Australian Open | NH | A | A | A | NH | | | | F | A | W | W | W | W | A | NH | | A | W | W | 6 / 7 | 12–0 | 100% |
| British Open | A | A | W | F | W | F | W | W | NH | W | A | W | W | W | NH | | W | W | W | W | 12 / 14 | 28–2 | 93% |
| French Open | SF | F | F | W | W | NH | W | W | W | A | W | W | W | W | NH | | F | W | W | | 10 / 15 | 16–4 | 80% |
| US Open | NH | | A | W | W | W | NH | W | A | A | W | A | A | W | NH | | W | W | W | F | 8 / 10 | 20–1 | 95% |
| Win–loss | 0–1 | 2–1 | 2–1 | 5–1 | 6–0 | 4–1 | 3–0 | 5–0 | 2–0 | 3–0 | 5–0 | 5–0 | 5–0 | 6–0 | 0–0 | 0–0 | 4–1 | 6–0 | 7–0 | 6–1 | 36 / 46 | 76–7 | 92% |
IRTPA Sanctioned Tournaments
| Win–loss | 0–0 | 0–0 | 0–0 | 0–0 | 0–0 | 0–0 | 0–0 | 0–0 | 0–0 | 0–0 | 0–0 | 0–0 | 0–0 | 0–0 | 0–0 | 0–0 | 0–0 | 0–0 | 0–0 | 0–0 | 0 / 0 | 0–0 | – |
Career Statistics
| | 2006 | 2007 | 2008 | 2009 | 2010 | 2011 | 2012 | 2013 | 2014 | 2015 | 2016 | 2017 | 2018 | 2019 | 2020 | 2021 | 2022 | 2023 | 2024 | 2025 | Career | | |
| Tournaments | 1 | 2 | 2 | 3 | 3 | 2 | 2 | 4 | 2 | 2 | 3 | 4 | 3 | 5 | 0 | 0 | 4 | 4 | 4 | 4 | Career total: 54 | | |
| Titles | 0 | 0 | 1 | 2 | 3 | 1 | 2 | 4 | 1 | 2 | 3 | 4 | 2 | 4 | 0 | 0 | 3 | 4 | 4 | 3 | Career total: 43 | | |
| Finals | 0 | 2 | 2 | 3 | 3 | 2 | 2 | 4 | 1 | 2 | 3 | 4 | 2 | 4 | 0 | 0 | 4 | 4 | 4 | 4 | Career total: 50 | | |
| Overall win–loss | 0–1 | 3–2 | 2–1 | 5–1 | 6–0 | 4–1 | 3–0 | 9–0 | 2–0 | 7–0 | 5–0 | 8–0 | 5–0 | 8–0 | 0–0 | 0–0 | 6–1 | 10–0 | 7–0 | 8–1 | 98–8 | | 92% |
| Win % | 0% | 60% | 67% | 83% | 100% | 80% | 100% | 100% | 100% | 100% | 100% | 100% | 100% | 100% | – | – | 86% | 100% | 100% | 89% | Career total: 92% | | |

=== Open doubles ===
| Tournament | 2014 | 2015 | 2016 | 2017 | 2018 | 2019 | 2020 | 2021 | 2022 | 2023 | 2024 | 2025 | SR | W–L | Win % |
|---|---|---|---|---|---|---|---|---|---|---|---|---|---|---|---|
World Championship
| Win–loss | 0–0 | 0–0 | 0–0 | 0–0 | 0–0 | 0–0 | 0–0 | 0–0 | 0–0 | 0–0 | 0–0 | 0–0 | 0 / 0 | 0–0 | – |
Grand Slam tournaments
| Australian Open | A | A | A | QF | QF | QF | A | NH | A | A | SF | QF | 0 / 5 | 1–5 | 17% |
| British Open | 1R | A | 1R | Q1 | A | 1R | NH | 1R | 1R | QF | 1R | | 0 / 7 | 1–7 | 13% |
| US Open | A | SF | A | A | A | A | A | A | A | A | A | A | 0 / 1 | 2–1 | 67% |
| Win–loss | 0–1 | 2–1 | 0–1 | 0–1 | 0–1 | 0–2 | 0–0 | 0–1 | 0–1 | 1–1 | 1–2 | 0–1 | 0 / 13 | 4–13 | 24% |
IRTPA Sanctioned Tournaments
| IRTPA Championship | NH | | QF | 2R | A | NH | | | | | | | 0 / 2 | 1–2 | 33% |
| Win–loss | 0–0 | 0–0 | 0–1 | 1–1 | 0–0 | 0–0 | 0–0 | 0–0 | 0–0 | 0–0 | 0–0 | 0–0 | 0 / 2 | 1–2 | 33% |
Career Statistics
| | 2014 | 2015 | 2016 | 2017 | 2018 | 2019 | 2020 | 2021 | 2022 | 2023 | 2024 | 2025 | Career | | |
| Tournaments | 1 | 1 | 2 | 2 | 1 | 2 | 0 | 1 | 1 | 1 | 2 | 1 | Career total: 15 | | |
| Titles | 0 | 0 | 0 | 0 | 0 | 0 | 0 | 0 | 0 | 0 | 0 | 0 | Career total: 0 | | |
| Finals | 0 | 0 | 0 | 0 | 0 | 0 | 0 | 0 | 0 | 0 | 0 | 0 | Career total: 0 | | |
| Overall win–loss | 0–1 | 2–1 | 0–2 | 1–2 | 0–1 | 0–2 | 0–0 | 0–1 | 0–1 | 1–1 | 1–2 | 0–1 | 5–15 | | 25% |
| Win % | 0% | 67% | 0% | 33% | 0% | 0% | – | 0% | 0% | 50% | 33% | 0% | Career total: 25% | | |
