= 2017 French Open (real tennis) =

2017 Open de France du Jeu de Paume
- Date: 24 September-1 October
- Edition: 37th
- Category: IRTPA (men); None (women)
- Draw: 16S / 8D (men); 8S / 4D (women)
- Location: Paris, France
- Venue: Société Sportive du Jeu de Paume & de Racquets

Champions

Men's singles
- (United States) Camden Riviere

Women's singles
- (United Kingdom) Claire Fahey

Men's doubles
- (United States) Camden Riviere / (United States) Tim Chisholm

Women's doubles
- (United Kingdom) Claire Fahey / (Netherlands) Saskia Bollerman
← 2016 ·	Open de France du Jeu de Paume	· 2018 →

The 2017 French Open also known as the 2017 Open de France du Jeu de Paume was the 37th edition of the real tennis French Open. The event was held at the Société Sportive du Jeu de Paume & de Racquets in Paris between September 24 and October 1, 2017, and was organised by the Comité Français de Courte-Paume, forming part of the qualifying series for the 2018 Real Tennis World Championship. The men's draw was the third grand slam event of the year.

The men's singles draw was won by defending champion Camden Riviere, his fifth French Open victory. The men's doubles draw was won by Camden Riviere and Tim Chisholm, their third victory on a way to the first ever men's calendar year grand slam. The women's singles draw was won by incumbent World Champion Claire Fahey, completing a calendar year grand slam. She also won the doubles competition with Saskia Bollerman, with Fahey also completing a calendar year grand slam in doubles, and Bollerman winning her first French Open doubles title. Bollerman also reached her first French Open singles final. Lea van der Zwalmen made her Open debut, reaching the final of the doubles draw.

== Draw and results ==
Amateur players are marked as (A)

=== Men's Singles ===
First round
1	(United States) C Riviere	6	6	6
(United Kingdom) J Lumley	1	1	2
(United Kingdom) D Long	6	4	4	6	6
(United Kingdom) Z Eadle	4	6	6	2	2
6	(Australia) C Chapman	1	1	3
(United Kingdom) L Smart	1	1	3
(France) M Sarlangue (A)	6	2	3	6	6
5	(United Kingdom) B Taylor-Matthews	5	6	6	5	2
4	(Australia) R Fahey	6	6	6
(United Kingdom) R McNaughtan	3	3	0
(United Kingdom) P Wright (A)	2	2	2
7	(United Kingdom) B Sayers	6	6	6
(Australia) N Howell	2	2	3
3	(United States) T Chisholm	6	6	6
(Australia) K Booth (A)	0	2	2
2	(Australia) S Virgona	5	2	5

Second round
1	(United States) C Riviere	6	6	6
(United Kingdom) D Long	0	3	0
6	(Australia) C Chapman	6	6	6
(France) M Sarlangue (A)	4	0	1
4	(Australia) R Fahey	6	6	6
7	(United Kingdom) B Sayers	2	4	4
(United States) T Chisholm	3	6	6	6
2	(Australia) K Booth (A)	6	2	4	3

Semifinals
1	(United States) C Riviere	6	6	6
6	(Australia) C Chapman	1	3	3
4	(Australia) R Fahey	6	6	3	4	6
3	(Australia) T Chisholm	2	3	6	6	1

Finals
1	(United States) C Riviere	6	6	6
4	(Australia) R Fahey	2	2	0

=== Men's Doubles ===
Quarterfinals
1	(United States) C Riviere (United Kingdom) T Chisholm	6	6	6
(United Kingdom) P Wright (A) (United Kingdom) L Smart	1	3	1
(United Kingdom) B Taylor-Matthews (United Kingdom) J Lumley	1	1	1
3	(Australia) R Fahey (Australia) N Howell	6	6	6
4	(Australia) S Virgona (Australia) C Chapman	6	6	6
(France) M Sarlangue (A) (United Kingdom) R McNaughtan	1	1	1
(United Kingdom) D Long (United Kingdom) W Burns	2	2	1
2	(Australia) K Booth (United Kingdom) B Sayers	6	6	6

Semifinals
1	(United States) C Riviere (United States) T Chisholm	6	6	6
3	(Australia) R Fahey (Australia) N Howell	3	5	4
4	(Australia) S Virgona (Australia) C Chapman	3	6	6	6
2	(Australia) K Booth (United Kingdom) B Sayers	6	5	2	2

Finals
1	(United States) C Riviere (United States) T Chisholm	6	6	6
4	(Australia) S Virgona (Australia) C Chapman	3	3	4

=== Women's Singles ===
Note: all players are amateurs except Claire Fahey

Quarterfinals
1	(United Kingdom) C Fahey	6	6
(United Kingdom) A Garside	0	0
(United Kingdom) I Candy	3	2
4	(United Kingdom) T Lumley	6	6
3	(Netherlands) S Bollerman	6	6
(France) L van der Zwalmen	4	3
(United Kingdom) J Garside	0	4
2	(United Kingdom) P Lumley	6	6

Semifinals
1	(United Kingdom) C Fahey	6	6
4	(United Kingdom) T Lumley	0	0
3	(Netherlands) S Bollerman	6	6
2	(United Kingdom) P Lumley	5	2

Finals
1	(United Kingdom) C Fahey	6	6
3	(Netherlands) S Bollerman	1	2

=== Women's Doubles ===
Note: all players are amateurs except Claire Fahey

Semifinals					Finals
1	(United Kingdom) C Fahey (Netherlands) S Bollerman	6	6
	(United Kingdom) I Candy (United Kingdom) A Garside	0	0		1	(United Kingdom) C Fahey (Netherlands) S Bollerman	6	6
	(United Kingdom) J Garside (France) L van der Zwalmen	3	6	6		(France) L van der Zwalmen (United Kingdom) J Garside	0	0
2	(United Kingdom) P Lumley (United Kingdom) T Lumley	6	3	3

== See also ==
- Grand Slam (real tennis)
