= 2019 French Open (real tennis) =

2019 Open de France du Jeu de Paume
- Date: 21-28 September
- Edition: 39th
- Category: IRTPA (men); None (women)
- Draw: 15S / 7D (men); 4S / 2D (women)
- Location: Paris, France
- Venue: Société Sportive du Jeu de Paume & de Racquets

Champions

Men's singles
- (United States) Camden Riviere

Women's singles
- (United Kingdom) Claire Fahey

Men's doubles
- (United States) Camden Riviere / (United Kingdom) John Lumley

Women's doubles
- (United Kingdom) Claire Fahey / (United Kingdom) Tara Lumley
← 2018 ·	Open de France du Jeu de Paume	· 2022 →

The 2019 French Open also known as the 2019 Open de France du Jeu de Paume was the 39th edition of the real tennis French Open. The event was held at the Société Sportive du Jeu de Paume & de Racquets in Paris between September 21 and 28, 2019, and was organised by the Comité Français de Courte-Paume, forming part of the qualifying series for the 2022 Real Tennis World Championship. It would be the last edition of the event until 2022, with the 2020 and 2021 events being cancelled due to the COVID-19 Pandmeic. The men's draw was the third grand slam event of the year.

The men's singles draw was won by former World Champion Camden Riviere, his sixth French Open victory. The men's doubles draw was won by Camden Riviere and John Lumley, with Lumley defending his 2018 title. The women's singles draw was won by incumbent World Champion Claire Fahey, completing a calendar year grand slam. She also won the doubles competition with Tara Lumley, with Fahey also completing a calendar year grand slam in doubles, and Lumley winning three out of four Opens in 2019.

== Draw and results ==
Amateur players are marked as (A)

=== Men's Singles ===
First round
(Australia) P Boyles (A)	0	3	2
(France) M Sarlangue (A)	6	6	6
6	(United Kingdom) B Sayers	3	4	4
5	(Australia) N Howell	6	6	6
(United Kingdom) D Long	3	4	4
4	(United Kingdom) B Taylor-Matthews	6	6	6
3	(Australia) C Chapman	6	6	6
(United Kingdom) J Smith	2	3	3
6	(United Kingdom) J Lumley	6	6	6
(United Kingdom) J Dodgson	3	3	2
(United Kingdom) R McNaughtan	6	6	6
(United Kingdom) P Wright (A)	3	4	4
(United Kingdom) N Mackenzie	0	2	2
2	(Australia) R Fahey	6	6	6

Second round
1	(United States) C Riviere	6	6	6
(France) M Sarlangue (A)	0	1	0
5	(Australia) N Howell	3	6	3	6	6
4	(United Kingdom) B Taylor-Matthews	6	4	6	3	4
3	(Australia) C Chapman	1	2	6	2
6	(United Kingdom) J Lumley	6	6	5	6
(United Kingdom) R McNaughtan	0	3	2
2	(Australia) R Fahey	6	6	6

Semifinals
1	(United States) C Riviere	6	6	6
5	(Australia) N Howell	1	4	4
6	(United Kingdom) J Lumley	3	6	6	5	5
2	(Australia) R Fahey	6	2	0	6	6

Finals
1	(United States) C Riviere	6	6	6
2	(Australia) R Fahey	2	5	1

=== Men's Doubles ===
Quarterfinals
(United Kingdom) R McNaughtan (United Kingdom) D Long	6	2	1	4
4	(United Kingdom) B Sayers (United Kingdom) B Taylor-Matthews	5	6	6	6
3	(Australia) C Chapman (France) M Sarlangue (A)	6	6	6
(United Kingdom) J Smith (United Kingdom) N Mackenzie	1	3	2
(United Kingdom) P Wright (United Kingdom) J Dodgson (A)	0	1	5
2	(Australia) R Fahey (Australia) N Howell	6	6	6

Semifinals
1	(United States) C Riviere (United Kingdom) J Lumley	6	6	6
4	(United Kingdom) B Sayers (United Kingdom) B Taylor-Matthews	3	4	3
3	(Australia) C Chapman (France) M Sarlangue	1	2	3
2	(Australia) R Fahey (Australia) N Howell	6	6	6

Finals
1	(United States) C Riviere (United Kingdom) J Lumley	6	6	6
2	(Australia) R Fahey (Australia) N Howell	2	4	5

=== Women's Singles ===
Note: all players are amateurs except Claire Fahey

Semifinals				Finals
1	(United Kingdom) C Fahey	6	6
4	(United Kingdom) J Garside	1	1	1	(United Kingdom) C Fahey	6	6
3	(United Kingdom) T Lumley	6	6	3	(United Kingdom) T Lumley	1	0
2	(United Kingdom) P Lumley	3	4

=== Women's Doubles ===
Note: all players are amateurs except Claire Fahey

Finals
1	(United Kingdom) C Fahey (United Kingdom) T Lumley	6	6
2	(United Kingdom) P Lumley (United Kingdom) J Garside	0	1

== See also ==
- Grand Slam (real tennis)
