= 2018 French Open (real tennis) =

2018 Open de France du Jeu de Paume
- Date: 23-30 September
- Edition: 38th
- Category: IRTPA (men); None (women)
- Draw: 16S / 8D (men); 8S / 4D (women)
- Location: Paris, France
- Venue: Société Sportive du Jeu de Paume & de Racquets

Champions

Men's singles
- (Australia) Chris Chapman

Women's singles
- (United Kingdom) Claire Fahey

Men's doubles
- (United Kingdom) John Lumley / (United Kingdom) Ben Taylor-Matthews

Women's doubles
- (United Kingdom) Claire Fahey / (United Kingdom) Nicola Doble
← 2017 ·	Open de France du Jeu de Paume	· 2019 →

The 2018 French Open also known as the 2018 Open de France du Jeu de Paume was the 38th edition of the real tennis French Open. The event was held at the Société Sportive du Jeu de Paume & de Racquets in Paris between September 23 and 30, 2018, and was organised by the Comité Français de Courte-Paume, forming part of the qualifying series for the 2022 Real Tennis World Championship. The men's draw was the third grand slam event of the year.

The men's singles draw was won by Chris Chapman, his first of three career Open victories. It was also his first appearance in the men's singles final at the French Open, where he defeated Ben Taylor-Matthews, also making his first appearance. The men's doubles draw was won by Taylor-Matthews and John Lumley. It was Lumley's second victory at the French Open and Taylor-Matthews first. The women's singles draw was won by incumbent World Champion Claire Fahey. She also won the doubles competition with Nicola Doble, the latter's first Open doubles title. Lea van der Zwalmen reached an Open singles final for the first time.

== Draw and results ==
Amateur players are marked as (A)

=== Men's Singles ===
First round
1	(Australia) R Fahey	6	3	6	6
(United Kingdom) J Smith	2	6	2	3
(France) N Victoir (A)	6	2	6	6
(United Kingdom) T Durack	1	6	2	1
(Australia) A Fowler	2	2	3
6	(United Kingdom) J Lumley	6	6	6
(United Kingdom) D Long	0	1	0
4	(United Kingdom) B Taylor-Matthews	6	6	6
3	(Australia) S Virgona	6	6	6
(United Kingdom) R McNaughtan	1	2	1
5	(Australia) N Howell	6	6	6
(United Kingdom) L Gordon	2	1	2
(United Kingdom) L Smart	3	6	1	2
(France) M Sarlangue (A)	6	4	6	6
(United Kingdom) P Wright (A)	5	4	0
2	(Australia) C Chapman	6	6	6

Second round
1	(Australia) R Fahey	6	6	6
(France) N Victoir (A)	1	2	3
6	(United Kingdom) J Lumley	6	6	2	4	4
4	(United Kingdom) B Taylor-Matthews	3	2	6	6	6
3	(Australia) S Virgona	6	4	5	6	6
5	(Australia) N Howell	2	6	6	5	2
(France) M Sarlangue (A)	3	4	3
2	(Australia) C Chapman	6	6	6

Semifinals
1	(Australia) R Fahey	3	5	4
4	(United Kingdom) B Taylor-Matthews	6	6	6
3	(United Kingdom) S Virgona	3	2	6	6	4
2	(Australia) C Chapman	6	6	5	2	6

Finals
3	(United Kingdom) B Taylor-Matthews	0	4	1
2	(Australia) C Chapman	6	6	6

=== Men's Doubles ===
Quarterfinals
1	(Australia) R Fahey (Australia) N Howell	6	6	6
(France) M Brunoro (A) (France) J Bey (A)	2	2	3
(United Kingdom) P Wright (A) (United Kingdom) L Gordon	2	2	0
3	(United Kingdom) J Lumley (United Kingdom) B Taylor-Matthews	6	6	3
4	(France) M Sarlangue (A) (United Kingdom) R McNaughtan	6	6	6
(United Kingdom) L Smart (United Kingdom) D Long	1	1	3
(Australia) A Fowler (France) B Jacquin-Turrettini (A)	0	0	0
2	(Australia) C Chapman (Australia) S Virgona	6	6	6

Semifinals
1	(Australia) R Fahey (United Kingdom) N Howell	5	6	2	5
3	(United Kingdom) J Lumley (United Kingdom) B Taylor-Matthews	6	5	6	6
4	(France) M Sarlangue (A) (United Kingdom) R McNaughtan	1	1	2
2	(Australia) C Chapman (Australia) S Virgona	6	6	6

Finals
1	(United Kingdom) J Lumley (United Kingdom) B Taylor-Matthews	4	6	2	6	6
2	(Australia) C Chapman (Australia) S Virgona	6	3	6	2	4

=== Women's Singles ===
Note: all players are amateurs except Claire Fahey

Quarterfinals
1	(United Kingdom) C Fahey	6	6
(United Kingdom) A Garside	0	1
(United Kingdom) J Garside	6	2	6
4	(United Kingdom) P Lumley	3	6	5
3	(United Kingdom) T Lumley	6	6
(Latvia) I Dulbish	1	1
(United Kingdom) N Doble	1	1
2	(France) L van der Zwalmen	6	6

Semifinals
1	(United Kingdom) C Fahey	6	6
(United Kingdom) J Garside	0	0
3	(United Kingdom) T Lumley	2	5
2	(France) L van der Zwalmen	6	6

Finals
1	(United Kingdom) C Fahey	6	6
2	(France) L van der Zwalmen	1	3

=== Women's Doubles ===
Note: all players are amateurs except Claire Fahey

Semifinals					Finals
1	(United Kingdom) C Fahey (United Kingdom) N Doble	6	6
	(United Kingdom) P Lumley (United Kingdom) A Garside	0	1		1	(United Kingdom) C Fahey (United Kingdom) N Doble	6	6
	(United Kingdom) T Lumley (Latvia) I Dulbish	6	4	4	2	(France) L van der Zwalmen (United Kingdom) J Garside	3	3
2	(France) L van der Zwalmen (United Kingdom) J Garside	2	6	6

== See also ==
- Grand Slam (real tennis)
