= 2022 British Open (real tennis) =

- Date: 12-21 November (men); 6–10 April (women)
- Edition: 44th (men); 44th (women)
- Category: IRTPA (men); None (women)
- Draw: 24S / 12D (men); 12S / 10D (women)
- Location: West Kensington, London, United Kingdom (men); Hayling Island, United Kingdom (women)
- Venue: Queen's Club (men); Seacourt Tennis Club (women)

Champions

Men's singles
- (United States) Camden Riviere

Women's singles
- (United Kingdom) Claire Fahey

Men's doubles
- (United Kingdom) John Lumley / (United States) Camden Riviere

Women's doubles
- (United Kingdom) Claire Fahey / (United Kingdom) Sarah Vigrass
← 2021 ·	British Open (real tennis)	· 2023 →

The 2022 Real Tennis British Open, branded as the Sir John Ritblat Foundation British Open for sponsorship reasons, was the 43rd edition of the British Open since it became an annual event in 1979. The men's event was held at the Queen's Club in London between November 13–22, 2022 and was organised by the Tennis and Rackets Association. It was the final qualifying event for the 2023 Real Tennis World Championship. The women's event was held at the Seacourt Tennis Club on Hayling Island between April 6–10, 2022. The men's draw was the fourth and final grand slam event of the year.

The men's singles draw was won by incumbent World Champion Camden Riviere after being absent in the previous edition. Riviere also won the men's doubles draw alongside Tim Chisholm. The women's singles draw was won by incumbent World Champion Claire Fahey, her tenth British Open singles victory. She also won the doubles draw with her sister Sarah Vigrass, their ninth British Open doubles victory as a pair.

At the conclusion of the tournament, Robert Fahey announced his retirement from singles competitions, although he would participate in the singles competition at the 2024 US Open. William Flynn and Max Trueman made their Open debuts in the doubles competition, reaching the quarter final stage.

== Draw and results ==
Amateur players are marked as (A)

=== Men's Singles Qualifying ===
==== First Qualifier ====
Qualifying Round 1				Final Qualifying Round
				1	(United Kingdom) N Merola	6	1	2
(United Kingdom) M Hobbs	3	6	4		(United Kingdom) W Flynn (A)	1	6	6
(United Kingdom) W Flynn (A)	6	4	6

==== Second Qualifier ====
Final Qualifying Round
2	(United Kingdom) Z Eadle	w/o
	(United Kingdom) A Player

==== Third Qualifier ====
Final Qualifying Round
3	(United Kingdom) C Greenhalgh	6	6
	(United Kingdom) B Vallat (A)	3	5

==== Fourth Qualifier ====
Final Qualifying Round
4	(United Kingdom) T Durack	6	4	4
	(United Kingdom) B Yorston (A)	4	6	6

=== Men's Singles ===
First round
Q	(United Kingdom) Z Eadle	3	1	6	4
(United Kingdom) N Mackenzie	6	6	4	6
(Australia) J Woods-Casey	5	6	6	6
Q	(United Kingdom) B Yorston (A)	6	3	2	2
Q	(United Kingdom) C Greenhalgh	3	6	1	1
(United Kingdom) R Shenkman (A)	6	4	6	6
(United Kingdom) P Wright (A)	6	4	1	2
(United States) T Chisholm	4	6	6	6
(United Kingdom) L Gale	6	4	6	6
(United Kingdom) L Gordon	1	6	3	4
(United Kingdom) J Smith	6	6	6
Q	(United Kingdom) W Flynn (A)	2	4	0
(United Kingdom) C Fahey	6	5	3	6	3
(United Kingdom) L Williams	3	6	6	3	6
(United Kingdom) D Long	2	6	5
(France) M Sarlangue (A)	6	5	1

Second Round
1	(United States) C Riviere	6	6	6
(United Kingdom) N Mackenzie	1	1	3
8	(United Kingdom) L Smart	6	6	6
(United Kingdom) J Woods-Casey	0	5	0
6	(Australia) N Howell	6	6	6
(United Kingdom) R Shenkman (A)	2	1	5
4	(United Kingdom) B Taylor-Matthews	6	6	6
(United States) T Chisholm	5	3	3
3	(United Kingdom) J Lumley	6	6	6
(United Kingdom) L Gale	1	1	4
5	(Australia) C Chapman	6	6	6
(United Kingdom) J Smith	2	2	4
8	(United Kingdom) B Sayers	6	6	6
(United Kingdom) L Williams	2	1	4
2	(Australia) R Fahey	6	6	6
(United Kingdom) D Long	5	1	5

Quarterfinals
1	(United States) C Riviere	6	6	6
8	(United Kingdom) L Smart	0	0	1
6	(Australia) N Howell	6	6	6
4	(United Kingdom) B Taylor-Matthews	2	0	2
3	(United Kingdom) J Lumley	5	6	6	6
5	(Australia) C Chapman	6	0	4	3
7	(United Kingdom) B Sayers	2	6	2	5
2	(United Kingdom) R Fahey	6	4	6	6

Semifinals
1	(United States) C Riviere	6	6	6
6	(Australia) N Howell	2	1	2
3	(United Kingdom) J Lumley	3	3	4
2	(Australia) R Fahey	6	6	6

Finals
1	(United States) C Riviere	6	6	6
2	(Australia) Robert Fahey	1	3	5

=== Men's Doubles Qualifying ===
==== First Qualifier ====
Final Qualifying Round
1	(United Kingdom) Z Eadle (United Kingdom) C Greenhalgh	6	0	5
	(United Kingdom) N Merola (United Kingdom) L Williams	3	6	6

==== Second Qualifier ====
Final Qualifying Round
	(United Kingdom) W Flynn (A) (United Kingdom) M Trueman (A)	6	6
2	(United Kingdom) L Danby (A) (United Kingdom) A Dolman (A)	1	3

=== Men's Doubles ===
First round
Q	(United Kingdom) N Merola (United Kingdom) L Williams	1	4	6	3
(United Kingdom) R Shenkman (A) (Australia) J Woods-Casey	6	6	5	6
6	(United Kingdom) N Mackenzie (United Kingdom) J Smith	1	3	6	6	2
(United Kingdom) J Douglas (A) (United Kingdom) P Wright (A)	6	6	3	2	6
(United Kingdom) C Fahey (United Kingdom) L Gale	3	4	1
5	(United Kingdom) D Long (United Kingdom) L Smart	6	6	6
Q	(United Kingdom) W Flynn (A) (United Kingdom) M Trueman (A)	6	6	6
(United Kingdom) T Durack (United Kingdom) L Gordon	1	5	5

Quarter-finals
1	(United Kingdom) J Lumley (United States) C Riviere	6	6	6
(United Kingdom) R Shenkman (A) (Australia) J Woods-Casey	2	1	0
3	(Australia) C Chapman (United Kingdom) B Taylor-Matthews	6	6	6
(United Kingdom) J Douglas (A) (United Kingdom) P Wright (A)	2	1	3
4	(United States) T Chisholm (United Kingdom) B Sayers	2	6	6	6
5	(United Kingdom) D Long (United Kingdom) L Smart	6	2	5	2
2	(Australia) R Fahey (Australia) N Howell	6	6	6
(United Kingdom) W Flynn (A) (United Kingdom) M Trueman (A)	2	1	1

Semi-finals
1	(United Kingdom) J Lumley (United States) C Riviere	6	6	6
3	(Australia) C Chapman (United Kingdom) B Taylor-Matthews	1	2	1
4	(United States) T Chisholm (United Kingdom) B Sayers	2	2	6	6	6
2	(Australia) R Fahey (Australia) N Howell	6	6	5	1	3

Final
1	(United States) T Chisholm (United States) C Riviere	3	6	6	6
4	(United States) T Chisholm (United Kingdom) B Sayers	6	1	1	4

=== Women's Singles ===
Note: all players are amateurs except Claire Fahey

First round
5	(United Kingdom) N Doble	1	1
(United Kingdom) O Boulton	6	6
(United Kingdom) S Dannreuther	2	1
4	(United Kingdom) P Lumley	6	6
(United Kingdom) A Oldham	3	1
6	(Latvia) I Dulbish	6	6
(United Kingdom) S Lewis	0	1
(United Kingdom) G Willis	6	6

Second round
1	(United Kingdom) C Fahey
bye
5	(United Kingdom) N Doble
4	(United Kingdom) P Lumley	w/o
3	(Netherlands) T Lumley	6	6
6	(Latvia) I Dulbish	2	1
(United Kingdom) G Willis	5	6	6
2	(United Kingdom) S Vigrass	6	1	5

Semifinals
1	(United Kingdom) C Fahey	6	6
4	(United Kingdom) P Lumley	0	0
3	(United Kingdom) T Lumley	3	4
(United Kingdom) G Willis	2	2

Finals
1	(United Kingdom) C Fahey	6	6
3	(United Kingdom) T Lumley	0	0

=== Women's Doubles ===
Note: all players are amateurs except Claire Fahey

First round
5	(United Kingdom) A Garside (United Kingdom) J Newby	6	6
(United Kingdom) S Lewis (France) B Bidouze	4	4
(United Kingdom) S Dannreuther (United Kingdom) K Leppard	6	6
(United Kingdom) C MacDowell (United Kingdom) O Boulton	0	2

Second round
1	(United Kingdom) C Fahey (United Kingdom) T Lumley
bye
(United Kingdom) A Garside (United Kingdom) J Newby	4	4
4	(United Kingdom) J Garside (Latvia) I Dulbish	6	6
3	(United Kingdom) N Doble (United Kingdom) G Willis	6	6
(United Kingdom) S Dannreuther (United Kingdom) K Leppard	0	2
(United Kingdom) R Law (United Kingdom) D Wilson	0	0
2	(United Kingdom) P Lumley (United Kingdom) T Lumley	6	6

Semifinals
1	(United Kingdom) C Fahey (United Kingdom) S Vigrass	6	6
4	(United Kingdom) J Garside (Latvia) I Dulbish	0	1
3	(United Kingdom) N Doble (United Kingdom) G Willis	5	6	3
2	(United Kingdom) P Lumley (United Kingdom) T Lumley	6	5	6

Finals
1	(United Kingdom) C Fahey (United Kingdom) S Vigrass	6	6
2	(United Kingdom) P Lumley (United Kingdom) T Lumley	0	2

== See also ==
- Grand Slam (real tennis)
