= 2024 British Open (real tennis) =

- Date: 17-26 November (men); 4–7 April (women)
- Edition: 45th (men); 45th (women)
- Category: IRTPA (men); None (women)
- Draw: 24S / 12D (men); 6S / 6D (women)
- Location: West Kensington, London, United Kingdom (men); Hayling Island, United Kingdom (women)
- Venue: Queen's Club (men); Seacourt Tennis Club (women)

Champions

Men's singles
- (United States) Camden Riviere

Women's singles
- (United Kingdom) Claire Fahey

Men's doubles
- (United States) Camden Riviere / (United States) Tim Chisholm

Women's doubles
- (United Kingdom) Claire Fahey / (United Kingdom) Sarah Vigrass
← 2023 ·	British Open (real tennis)	· 2025 →

The 2024 Real Tennis British Open, branded as the Sir John Ritblat Foundation British Open for sponsorship reasons, was the 45th edition of the British Open since it became an annual event in 1979. The men's event was held at the Queen's Club in London between November 17–26, 2024 and is being organised by the Tennis and Rackets Association. It was the last qualifying event for the 2025 Real Tennis World Championship, with John Lumley and Nick Howell already qualified to the Eliminators. The women's event was held at the Seacourt Tennis Club on Hayling Island between April 4–7, 2024. The men's draw was the fourth and final grand slam event of the year. It was the first time the event had matches scheduled on more than one court.

Incumbent World Champion Camden Riviere successfully defended his title, registering his seventh British Open victory. He defeated Nick Howell in the final. Howell made his first appearance at a British Open final, and won a set off Riviere for the first time in his career. Riviere also defended the men's doubles draw alongside Tim Chisholm. They beat Howell and Leon Smart in the final, the latter making his debut British Open Final appearance. The women's singles draw was won by incumbent World Champion Claire Fahey, her twelfth British Open singles victory. She also won the doubles draw with Sarah Vigrass, her ninth British Open doubles title.

== Points Allocation ==
Points were available for the IRTPA World Rankings and the IRTPA World Race, the latter forming the qualifying path for the 2025 Real Tennis World Championship. Ranking points are only available for the men's draws. The points available are shown in the table below.

Draw	Winner	Runner up	Semi Final	Quarter Final	Round of 16	Round of 24
Men's Singles	15570	10380	6228	3114	1038	0
Men's Doubles	2790	1860	1116	558	186	-

== Draw and results ==
Amateur players are marked as (A)

=== Men's Singles Qualifying ===
Jamie Giddins was originally listed as third seed, playing in the third qualifier route. Upon his withdrawal, Zak Eadle was promoted to a seeded position.

==== First Qualifier ====
First Qualifying Round			Final Qualifying Round
			1	(United Kingdom) N Mackenzie	6	0	6
(United Kingdom) N Batstone (A)	6	6		(United Kingdom) N Batstone (A)	4	6	1
(United Kingdom) M Hobbs	3	2

==== Second Qualifier ====
First Qualifying Round				Final Qualifying Round
				2	(United Kingdom) W Flynn	5	3
(United Kingdom) H Henman (A)	2	6	6		(United Kingdom) H Henman (A)	6	6
(United Kingdom) C Aley	6	4	1

==== Third Qualifier ====
First Qualifying Round				Final Qualifying Round
				5	(United Kingdom) Z Eadle	6	6
(United Kingdom) J Whitaker (A)	4	6	3		(United Kingdom) B Yorston (A)	1	0
(United Kingdom) B Yorston (A)	6	3	6

==== Fourth Qualifier ====
First Qualifying Round			Final Qualifying Round
			4	(United Kingdom) J Medlow	6	6
(United Kingdom) A Player	2	4		(United Kingdom) C Greenhalgh	4	1
(United Kingdom) C Greenhalgh	6	6

=== Men's Singles ===
Levi Gale withdrew prior to the start of the tournament. Will Flynn was promoted into the main draw as a lucky loser from the qualifiers.

First round
Q4	(United Kingdom) J Medlow	3	4	4
(United Kingdom) V Hamilton	6	6	6
LL	(United Kingdom) W Flynn (A)	5	6	6	3	5
Q3	(United Kingdom) Z Eadle	6	2	4	6	6
Q2	(United Kingdom) H Henman (A)	6	3	3	6	2
(United Kingdom) N Merola	1	6	6	2	6
(United Kingdom) B Vallat (A)	6	0	6	0	6
(United Kingdom) L Williams	3	6	4	6	2
(United Kingdom) D Long	3	6	6	6
(United Kingdom) L Gordon	6	1	4	1
(Australia) J Woods-Casey	1	6	6	2	6
(United States) T Chisholm	6	3	3	6	2
(United Kingdom) T Hollins	0	3	2
(United States) F Bristowe (A)	6	6	6
(United Kingdom) C Fahey	2	3
Q1	(United Kingdom) N Mackenzie	6	0

Second Round
1	(United States) C Riviere	6	6	6
(United Kingdom) V Hamilton	1	2	0
5	(Australia) S Virgona	6	4
Q3	(United Kingdom) Z Eadle	0	1
8	(France) M Sarlangue	4	4	2
(United Kingdom) N Merola	6	6	6
3	(United Kingdom) B Taylor-Matthews	6	6	6
(United Kingdom) B Vallat (A)	0	1	0
4	(Australia) R Fahey	6	6	6
(United Kingdom) D Long	3	1	0
6	(United Kingdom) L Smart	6	5	6	6
(Australia) J Woods-Casey	5	6	4	4
7	(United Kingdom) R Shenkman (A)	6	6	6
(United States) F Bristowe (A)	5	3	5
2	(Australia) N Howell	6	6	6
(United Kingdom) C Fahey	1	1	2

Quarterfinals
1	(United States) C Riviere	6	6	6
5	(Australia) S Virgona	4	4	2
(United Kingdom) N Merola	0	1	2
3	(United Kingdom) B Taylor-Matthews	6	6	6
4	(Australia) R Fahey	6	3
6	(United Kingdom) L Smart	3	2
7	(United Kingdom) R Shenkman (A)	6	0	1	1
2	(Australia) N Howell	3	6	6	6

Semifinals
1	(United States) C Riviere	6	6	6
3	(United Kingdom) B Taylor-Matthews	0	1	4
6	(United Kingdom) L Smart	1	2	3
2	(Australia) N Howell	6	6	6

Finals
1	(United States) C Riviere	2	6	6	6
2	(Australia) N Howell	6	4	0	5

=== Men's Doubles Qualifying ===
Adam Dolman and James Acheson-Gray were due to play Zak Eadle and Craig Greenhalgh in the first round but withdrew prior to the start of the competition

==== First Qualifier ====
First Qualifying Round			Final Qualifying Round
			1	(United Kingdom) C Fahey (United Kingdom) H Henman (A)
(United Kingdom) N James (A) (United Kingdom) B Vallat (A)	6	6		(United Kingdom) N James (A) (United Kingdom) B Vallat (A)
(United Kingdom) N Batstone (A) (United Kingdom) B Yorston (A)	2	4

==== Second Qualifier ====
First Qualifying Round			Final Qualifying Round
			2	(United Kingdom) Z Eadle (United Kingdom) C Greenhalgh	2	2
(United Kingdom) W Flynn (A) (United Kingdom) J Medlow	6	6		(United Kingdom) W Flynn (A) (United Kingdom) J Medlow	6	6
(Netherlands) P Bollerman (A) (United Kingdom) W Burns	1	2

=== Men's Doubles ===
Levi Gale was originally due to play with Lewis Williams as the sixth seed, but withdrew prior to the start of the main draw. Williams then partnered with Jonny Whitaker, but were replaced as sixth seeds by Freddie Bristowe and Adam Player

First round
(United Kingdom) V Hamilton (Australia) J Woods-Casey	6	6	4	6
Q1	(United Kingdom) C Fahey (United Kingdom) H Henman	2	2	6	3
6	(United Kingdom) D Long (United Kingdom) N Mackenzie	6	2	4	1
(United States) F Bristowe (A) (United Kingdom) A Player	3	6	6	6
Q2	(United Kingdom) W Flynn (A) (United Kingdom) J Medlow	1	5	4
5	(United Kingdom) L Gordon (United Kingdom) R Shenkman (A)	6	6	6
(United Kingdom) J Whitaker (United Kingdom) L Williams	6	6	6
(United Kingdom) T Hollins (United Kingdom) T Durack	2	3	1

Quarter-finals
1	(United States) T Chisholm (United States) C Riviere	6	6	6
(United Kingdom) V Hamilton (Australia) J Woods-Casey	0	1	3
4	(United Kingdom) B Taylor-Matthews (United Kingdom) N Merola	6	6	6
(United States) F Bristowe (A) (United Kingdom) A Player	4	4	2
3	(Australia) R Fahey (Australia) S Virgona	6	6	6
5	(United Kingdom) L Gordon (United Kingdom) R Shenkman (A)	4	4	3
2	(Australia) N Howell (United Kingdom) L Smart	6	6	6
(United Kingdom) J Whitaker (United Kingdom) L Williams	3	2	4

Semi-finals
1	(United States) T Chisholm (United States) C Riviere	4	6	6	6
4	(United Kingdom) B Taylor-Matthews (United Kingdom) N Merola	6	2	5	5
3	(Australia) R Fahey (Australia) S Virgona	6	5	3	6	5
2	(Australia) N Howell (United Kingdom) L Smart	3	6	6	5	6

Final
1	(United States) T Chisholm (United States) C Riviere	6	6	6
2	(Australia) N Howell (United Kingdom) L Smart	0	0	3

=== Women's Singles Qualifying ===
==== First Qualifier ====
First Qualifying Round				Final Qualifying Round
(United Kingdom) I Marshall	6	6
(United Kingdom) J Taylor	0	0		(United Kingdom) I Marshall	6	6
(United Kingdom) R Hollington	6	3	4	(United Kingdom) S Dannreuther	1	5
(United Kingdom) S Dannreuther	2	6	6

==== Second Qualifier ====
First Qualifying Round			Final Qualifying Round
(France) B Bidouze	0	0
(United Kingdom) A Bryant	6	6	(United Kingdom) A Bryant	3	4
(United Kingdom) S Lewis	1	3	(United Kingdom) A Oldham	6	6
(United Kingdom) A Oldham	6	6

=== Women's Singles ===
Note: all players are amateurs except Claire Fahey

Quarterfinals					Semifinals				Finals
					1	(United Kingdom) C Fahey	6	6
Q	(United Kingdom) I Marshall	6	0	6	Q	(United Kingdom) I Marshall	0	1
4	(United Kingdom) J Garside	4	6	4					1	(United Kingdom) C Fahey	6	6
2	(United Kingdom) T Lumley	6	6						2	(United Kingdom) T Lumley	1	2
Q	(United Kingdom) A Oldham	2	0		2	(United Kingdom) T Lumley	6	6
					3	(United Kingdom) S Vigrass	3	2

=== Women's Doubles Qualifying ===
==== First Qualifier ====
Final Qualifying Round
(United Kingdom) C Nicholls (United Kingdom) S Sullivan	0	3
(United Kingdom) A Bryant (United Kingdom) R Hollington	6	6

==== Second Qualifier ====
Final Qualifying Round
(United Kingdom) S Lewis (United Kingdom) K Yamaguchi	6	6
(France) B Bidouze (United Kingdom) J Taylor	1	0

=== Women's Doubles ===
Note: all players are amateurs except Claire Fahey

Quarterfinals					Semifinals				Finals
					1	(United Kingdom) C Fahey (United Kingdom) S Vigrass	6	6
Q	(United Kingdom) A Bryant (United Kingdom) R Hollington	6	2	3	4	(United Kingdom) S Dannreuther (United Kingdom) A Oldham	0	0
4	(United Kingdom) S Dannreuther (United Kingdom) A Oldham	3	6	6					1	(United Kingdom) C Fahey (United Kingdom) S Vigrass	6	6
3	(United Kingdom) A Garside (Latvia) I Dulbish	5	6	6					2	(United Kingdom) J Garside (United Kingdom) T Lumley	1	1
Q	(United Kingdom) S Lewis (United Kingdom) K Yamaguchi	6	1	0	3	(United Kingdom) A Garside (Latvia) I Dulbish	2	2
					2	(United Kingdom) J Garside (United Kingdom) T Lumley	6	6

== See also ==
- Grand Slam (real tennis)
