= 2023 Ladies Real Tennis World Championships =

- Date: 10-16 April, 2023
- Edition: 20th
- Draw: 18S / 16D
- Location: Woodcote, Oxfordshire
- Venue: The Oratory School

Champions

Women's singles
- (United Kingdom) Claire Fahey

Women's doubles
- (United Kingdom) Claire Fahey / (United Kingdom) Tara Lumley

Girls' singles
- (United Kingdom) Cesca Sweet
← 2022 ·	Real Tennis World Championship	· 2025 →

The 2023 Ladies Real Tennis World Championships was the 20th edition of the biennial Ladies Real Tennis World Championships, held at The Oratory School in Woodcote, Oxfordshire in April 2023. It was the first time the event was held in the United Kingdom since 2015 as the event follows a rotation through the four tennis-playing countries. The singles event was won by defending champion Claire Fahey, her seventh victory beating the record of six victories previously held by Penny Lumley. Fahey also won the doubles with Tara Lumley, being Fahey's seventh doubles victory, equalling the record held by Penny Lumley. An Under 19 Girls World Championship was organised for the first time, which was won by first seed Cesca Sweet. Ulla Petti became the first Estonian to participate in a Ladies World Championship.

== Singles ==
=== Finals ===
Semifinals
1	(United Kingdom) Claire Fahey	6	6
4	(Netherlands) Saskia Bollerman	0	0
3	(United Kingdom) Tara Lumley	3	0
2	(France) Lea van der Zwalmen	6	6

Finals
1	(United Kingdom) Claire Fahey	6	6
2	(France) Lea van der Zwalmen	1	1

=== Top Half ===
First Round
(France) G Smart	4	3
(United Kingdom) J Taylor	6	6
(Australia) JS Tan	6	6
(France) A Huynh-Lenhardt	1	0

Second Round
1	(United Kingdom) C Fahey
bye
(Australia) S Poolman	0	6	6
(United Kingdom) J Taylor	6	2	5
(United Kingdom) K Carney	6	6
(United Kingdom) V Harvey	4	2
bye
5	(United Kingdom) N Doble
7	(United Kingdom) G Willis
bye
(United Kingdom) C Bucknell	0	2
(Australia) JS Tan	6	6
(Canada) J Siu	0	1
(United Kingdom) S Dannreuther	6	6
bye
4	(Netherlands) S Bollerman

Third Round
1	(United Kingdom) C Fahey	6	6
(Australia) S Poolman	0	0
(United Kingdom) K Carney	0	0
5	(United Kingdom) N Doble	6	6
7	(United Kingdom) G Willis	6	6
(Australia) JS Tan	4	3
(United Kingdom) S Dannreuther	0	1
8	(Netherlands) S Bollerman	6	6

Quarter Finals
1	(United Kingdom) C Fahey	6	6
5	(United Kingdom) N Doble	0	0
7	(United Kingdom) G Willis	5	1
4	(Netherlands) S Bollerman	6	6

Semi Finals
1	(United Kingdom) C Fahey	6	6
4	(Netherlands) S Bollerman	0	0

=== Bottom Half ===
Second Round
(United Kingdom) R Hollington	4	2
(United Kingdom) C Sweet	6	6
(United Kingdom) J Tomlinson	3	6	6
(United Kingdom) I Marshall	6	5	5
(Estonia) U Petti	6	4	6
(United Kingdom) T Machin	4	6	1
(France) L Grosset	0	0
(United Kingdom) A Oldham	6	6

Third Round
3	(United Kingdom) T Lumley	6	6
(United Kingdom) C Sweet	0	0
(United Kingdom) J Tomlinson	0	0
8	(Latvia) I Dulbish	6	6
6	(United Kingdom) P Lumley	6	6
(Estonia) U Petti	0	1
(United Kingdom) A Oldham	0	0
2	(France) L van der Zwalmen	6	6

Quarter Finals
3	(United Kingdom) T Lumley	6	6
8	(Latvia) I Dulbish	1	2
6	(United Kingdom) P Lumley	1	1
2	(France) L van der Zwalmen	6	6

Semi Finals
3	(United Kingdom) T Lumley	3	0
2	(France) L van der Zwalmen	6	6

== Doubles ==
=== Qualifying ===
==== First Qualifier ====
Final Qualifying Round
(United Kingdom) L Hutchinson (United Kingdom) C Nicholls	6	6
(United Kingdom) M Hawkey (United Kingdom) J Taylor	2	5

==== Second Qualifier ====
Final Qualifying Round
(France) L Grosset (Australia) S Poolman	6	6
(France) B Bidouze (United Kingdom) S Sullivan	3	0

=== Main Draw ===
First round
1	(United Kingdom) C Fahey (United Kingdom) T Lumley	6	6
(United Kingdom) C Bucknell (United Kingdom) A Oldham	0	0
(United Kingdom) I Marshall (United Kingdom) J Tomlinson	6	6
(United Kingdom) A Kirkwood (United Kingdom) C Mayer	0	1
(United Kingdom) A Brodie (United Kingdom) S Dannreuther	6	6
(United Kingdom) S Brownlee (United Kingdom) K Carney	3	0
(United Kingdom) T Machin (United Kingdom) C Sweet	0	1
5	(United Kingdom) P Lumley (Australia) JS Tan	6	6
4	(Latvia) I Dulbish (United Kingdom) J Garside	6	6
(United States) K Kilgore (United Kingdom) K Leppard	1	0
Q	(France) L Grosset (Australia) S Poolman	0	0
3	(United Kingdom) N Doble (United Kingdom) G Willis	6	6
(United Kingdom) R Hollington (United Kingdom) G Ingham	6	6
(United Kingdom) M Henderson-Tew (United Kingdom) R Kashti	0	3
Q	(United Kingdom) C Nicholls (United Kingdom) L Hutchinson	0	0
2	(France) L van der Zwalmen (Netherlands) S Bollerman	6	6

Quarter-finals
1	(United Kingdom) C Fahey (United Kingdom) T Lumley	6	6
(United Kingdom) I Marshall (United Kingdom) J Tomlinson	0	0
(United Kingdom) A Brodie (United Kingdom) S Dannreuther	1	1
5	(United Kingdom) P Lumley (Australia) JS Tan	6	6
4	(Latvia) I Dulbish (United Kingdom) J Garside	4	2
3	(United Kingdom) N Doble (United Kingdom) G Willis	6	6
(United Kingdom) R Hollington (United Kingdom) G Ingham
2	(France) L van der Zwalmen (Netherlands) S Bollerman	w/o

Semi-finals
1	(United Kingdom) C Fahey (United Kingdom) T Lumley	6	6
5	(United Kingdom) P Lumley (Australia) JS Tan	1	0
3	(United Kingdom) N Doble (United Kingdom) G Willis	2	1
2	(France) L van der Zwalmen (Netherlands) S Bollerman	6	6

Final
1	(United Kingdom) C Fahey (United Kingdom) T Lumley	6	6
2	(France) L van der Zwalmen (Netherlands) S Bollerman	4	5

== Girls U19's ==
First round
(United Kingdom) C Lamming	6	6
(United Kingdom) M Rice	2	4
(United Kingdom) O Boulton	6	4	6
(United Kingdom) D Blaber	3	6	3
(United Kingdom) Isabella Harvey	2	1
(United Kingdom) K Carney	6	6
(France) F Ridall Bell	6	0	6
(United Kingdom) L Compton Burnett	5	6	2

Second round
1	(United Kingdom) C Sweet	6	6
(United Kingdom) C Lamming	0	0
(United Kingdom) O Boulton	2	6	5
4	(United States) H Christensen	6	4	6
3	(United States) C Yannuzzi	1	4
(United Kingdom) K Carney	6	6
(United Kingdom) F Ridall Bell	1	1
2	(United Kingdom) A Vyvyan-Robinson	6	6

Semifinals
1	(United Kingdom) C Sweet	6	4	6
4	(United States) H Christensen	0	6	1
(United Kingdom) K Carney	5	6	6
2	(United Kingdom) A Vyvyan-Robinson	6	3	4

Finals
1	(United Kingdom) C Sweet	6	6
(United Kingdom) K Carney	0	2
