= 2022 Ladies Real Tennis World Championships =

- Date: 13-17 April, 2023
- Edition: 19th
- Draw: 13S / 6D
- Location: Fontainebleau, France
- Venue: Palace of Fontainebleau

Champions

Women's singles
- (United Kingdom) Claire Fahey

Women's doubles
- (United Kingdom) Claire Fahey / (United Kingdom) Sarah Vigrass
← 2019 ·	Real Tennis World Championship	· 2023 →

The 2022 Ladies Real Tennis World Championships was the 19th edition of the biennial Ladies Real Tennis World Championships, held at the Palace of Fontainebleau in April 2022. It was delayed from its original date in 2021 due to the COVID-19 pandemic It was the first time the event was held in France since 2013 as the event follows a rotation through the four tennis-playing countries. Fontainebleau had previously hosted the men's World Championship in 2008 and the men's World Doubles Championships in 2005. The singles event was won by defending champion Claire Fahey, her sixth victory equalling the record previously held by Penny Lumley. Fahey also won the doubles with her sister Sarah Vigrass. Lea van der Zwalmen made her World Championship debut, reaching the final of the singles draw.

== Singles ==
First round
7	(United Kingdom) P Lumley	1	2
(United Kingdom) A Brodie	6	6
8	(United Kingdom) N Doble	6	6
(France) Q Idiart	0	0
4	(United Kingdom) T Lumley	6	6
(France) M Simlesa	0	0
(France) A Huynh-Lendhardt	0	0
5	(United Kingdom) I Candy	6	6
6	(Netherlands) S Bollerman	6	6
(Australia) X Ranger	1	1

Second round
1	(United Kingdom) C Fahey	6	6
7	(United Kingdom) P Lumley	0	0
8	(United Kingdom) N Doble	3	2
3	(United Kingdom) S Vigrass	6	6
3	(United Kingdom) T Lumley	6	6
5	(United Kingdom) I Candy	1	0
6	(Netherlands) S Bollerman	3	3
2	(France) L van der Zwalmen	6	6

Semifinals
1	(United Kingdom) C Fahey	6	6
3	(United Kingdom) S Vigrass	2	1
4	(United Kingdom) T Lumley	1	0
2	(France) L van der Zwalmen	6	6

Finals
1	(United Kingdom) C Fahey	6	6
2	(France) L van der Zwalmen	0	2

== Doubles ==
Quarterfinals
(Australia) X Ranger (United Kingdom) F Adam	2	2
(United Kingdom) T Lumley (United Kingdom) J Garside	6	6
(United Kingdom) P Lumley (United Kingdom) A Garside	6	0	1
(United Kingdom) N Doble (United Kingdom) A Brodie	5	6	6

Semifinals
1	(United Kingdom) C Fahey (United Kingdom) S Vigrass	6	6
(United Kingdom) T Lumley (United Kingdom) J Garside	1	1
2	(United Kingdom) I Candy (Netherlands) S Bollerman	6	6
(United Kingdom) N Doble (United Kingdom) A Brodie	0	1

Finals
1	(United Kingdom) C Fahey (United Kingdom) S Vigrass	6	6
2	(United Kingdom) I Candy (Netherlands) S Bollerman	0	1
