= Jack Johnson (real tennis) =

English real tennis player

Albert Ariel Bedwin "Jack" Johnson (5 December 1914 – 9 March 1996) was an English real tennis player.

Johnson was real tennis world champion from 1957 through 1959.

Johnson, a native of Moreton Morrell, emigrated from the United Kingdom to the United States, and died in Indiana in 1996.

== See also ==
- Real tennis world champions
