= Holyport Real Tennis Club =

Real tennis club in Berkshire, England

Coordinates: 51.493°N 0.714°W

The Holyport Real Tennis Club, formerly the Royal County of Berkshire Real Tennis Club, operates the real tennis court at Holyport, Berkshire, England.

The court was built in 1889 by Sam Heilbut as part of his Holyport estate and is a Grade II listed building. The court is tucked behind a row of picturesque cottages on Holyport Street. The main house of the estate is now a nursing home.

The overall dimensions of the court are 111 feet by 38 feet 8 inches (33.83 × 11.79 m), with a floor of 96 feet by 31 feet 8 inches (29.26 × 9.65 m). The tambour (buttress) is 18½ inches wide by 25½ inches deep (470 × 648 mm). About a two hundred members of the Holyport Real Tennis Club use the court.

In 2013 there were fears that the club would be sold to a property developer but it was saved for use as a real tennis club by a consortium of owners. Following the change of ownership the club has been run by Club Director, John Evans. In 2014, the club celebrated 125 years of play and marked the milestone with a nine day celebration, which included tournaments and a black tie ball.

In 2015 the club hosted the IRTPA Championships.
