= Comité Français de Courte-Paume =

The French Real Tennis Committee (Comité Français de Courte-Paume) is the national governing body for the sport of real tennis in France. It is a dependent commission of the French Tennis Federation (Fédération Française de Tennis). The federation was founded on October 30, 1920, and recognized publicly on July 13, 1923, to organize, direct, control, and develop the sports of lawn tennis and real tennis. The federation affiliated various preëxisting tennis associations.
