= Kate Leeming =

Australian endurance cyclist and explorer

Dr. Kate Leeming
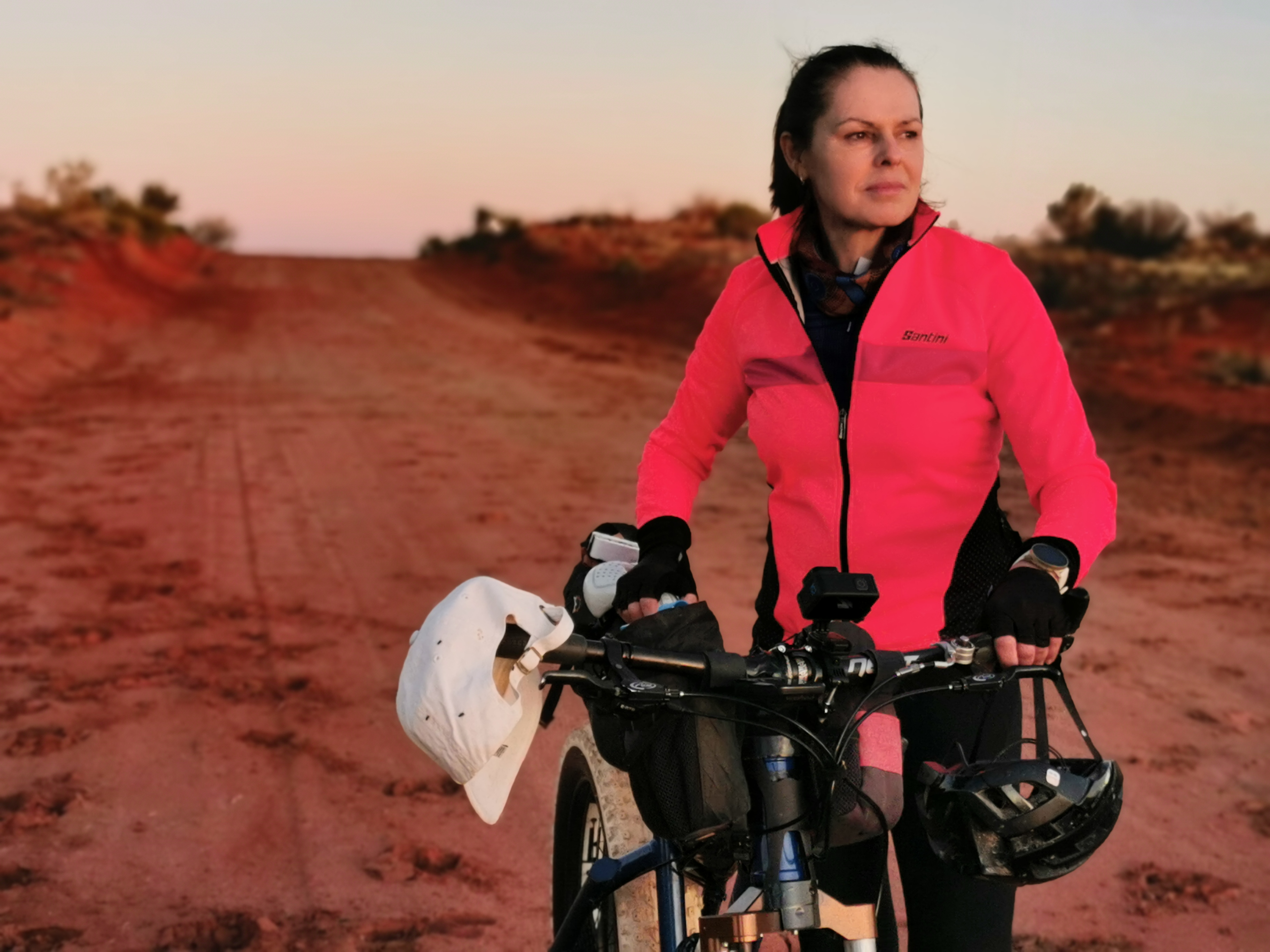
- Kate Leeming, explorer and expedition cyclist
- Born: 1967 (age 58–59); Northam, Western Australia
- Occupations: Cyclist, explorer, real tennis professional
- Notable work: Out There and Back (2007, book), Njinga (2014, book and film), Diamonds in the Sand (2021, TV series)

Kate Leeming (born 1967) is an Australian extreme endurance cyclist and explorer, known for several long-distance cycling expeditions. She has cycled more than twice around the world at the equator.

== Background ==
Leeming was raised in Northam, rural Western Australia, graduating from the University of Western Australia in the 1980s and qualifying as a teacher (Geography and Physical Education). She spent 12 years (1990–2002) in the UK and France, initially as a hockey player, then a fitness trainer before becoming a Real Tennis professional. During this time she cycled 15,000 kilometres (9,300 mi) through Europe, from Spain to Turkey, and on to Nordkapp, Norway.

Leeming is divorced. As of June 2024, she lives in Melbourne, Australia and is a professional in real tennis at the Royal Melbourne Tennis Club.

== Expeditions ==
Leeming undertook the "Trans-Siberian Cycle Expedition" (with Greg Yeoman) in 1993, becoming the first woman to cycle across the new Russia unsupported, ending in Vladivostok on a bike that was suffering metal fatigue. The 13,400 km journey took 5 months and included long stretches following the Trans-Siberian railway in swampy conditions. Sponsorship was donated to support the children of Chernobyl.

The "Great Australian Cycle Expedition" (2004/2005) was 25,000 km, largely unaided, and following a circuitous route beginning and ending in Canberra. It included the first bicycle crossing of the Canning Stock Route by a woman. The book Out There and Back (2007) documents the trip.

On 16 August 2010 she became the first person to cycle an unbroken line from Africa's most westerly to its most easterly points; from Pointe des Almadies, Senegal to Cape Hafun, Puntland, Somalia. She cycled 22,040 km over ten months, supported by a small team for some of the journey. Crossing 20 countries in 299 days, access through the final stretch in Somalia was granted by breakaway states, including Puntland where al-Shabaab rebels threatened the convoy. Sponsorship was used to support "Breaking the Cycle in Africa", highlighting development needs and activities of war-torn and poverty-stricken nations, particular the education of girls. A prizewinning documentary awaits wide distribution and the book Njinga documents the journey.

In June 2019, she became the first person to cycle the entire Namibian coastline, 1,621 km largely on sand, crossing extensive dune fields as well as beaches. She began at the mouth of the Kunene River on the Angolan border, and traversed the Skeleton Coast heading south and the Namib Desert to the Orange River mouth on the South African border. She used an all-wheel drive bike with a pinion drive and clutch to the front wheel and oversized tyres. The first of several of these Christini bikes was built in Philadelphia in 2013. The expedition was captured in a documentary series, Diamonds In the Sand, shown on Outside TV, National Geographic Asia and CNBC.

Recent expeditions have included "The Andes, the Altiplano & the Atacama" (2020 and 2022, from Cusco, Peru across the Bolivian Altiplano and the Argentinian Puna de Atacama), "The Lights of Ladakh" which brought solar power to the most remote community in the Zanskar Range, the Indian Himalaya (film, 2018), along the course of the Finke River in central Australia, down the Baja Divide in Mexico and training in Svalbard, Northeast Greenland, Arctic Canada and Iceland for a proposed expedition across Antarctica. In February 2023 she completed her first brief Antarctic venture—a 201 km cycling trip from Wolf's Fang Runway to Whichaway Camp, with vehicle support. On 19 September 2023 she completed a trip from mainland Australia's most easterly point, Cape Byron, to its most westerly, Steep Point, covering 8,617 km.

On 16 August 2025, Kate completed her Breaking the Cycle Central Asia expedition, a 9001 km, 149-day journey through the heart of Central Asia. Her route followed the Syr Darya (Jaxartes River) from its source in the Tien Shan, Kyrgyzstan, to the Aral Sea, and then traced the course of the mighty Amu Darya (Oxus River), concluding with a geographical “first,” the discovery of its true source. Kate's team* named the glacial lake, a 100m x 150m permanent feature in the landscape, after their esteemed guide Malang Darya, the first Afghani to climb Afghanistan's highest peak, Mt Noshaq. Lake Malang lies at the head of the West tributary of Chelab Stream in the Little Pamir, Wakhan Corridor, Afghanistan.

The Oxus was the last major river in the world of which the ultimate source was unidentified. Discovering its true source solves a 3000-year mystery of Central Asia's greatest river. The importance of finding the true source had been heightened during the time of the Great Game (mid-1800s – early 1900s), when the British and Russian empires vied for control of Central Asia.

- The team included Rupert McCowan (Geographer, Director of the Royal Geographical Society – Hong Kong), Malang Darya and filmmaker Adrian Dmoch. In 2007 an expedition led by Bill Colegrave had identified the Chelab stream as the source of the Oxus, but no one had since explored the Chelab's own source.

== Sport ==
Leeming was ranked number 2 in the world for Real Tennis, reaching the finals in women's doubles four times between 1997 and 2019. She is a former Australian women's singles champion, winning 5 titles between 1996 and 2013, and coaches the sport.

== Awards ==
- Njinga - Action on Film International Film Festival in Los Angeles, best documentary (cinematography) and best documentary (sport), 2014
- Honorary Doctor of Education (2016, The University of Western Australia)
- Spirit of Adventure, Australian Geographic Society Award winner (Australian Geographic Society, 2023)
- World Explorer, 2023
- Medal of the Order of Australia, January 2023
