= Tennis and Rackets Association =

UK sports governing body

The Tennis and Rackets Association is the governing body for the sports of real tennis and (hard) rackets in the United Kingdom. Its first meeting was held in 1907.

== Tennis courts ==
See: real tennis organizations

== Rackets courts ==
=== Clubs ===
- Britannia Royal Naval College (Dartmouth)
- Seacourt (Hayling Island)
- Queen's Club (London)
- Manchester Tennis and Racquet Club
- Newcastle Rackets Court
- Royal Military Academy Sandhurst

=== Schools ===
- Charterhouse School
- Cheltenham College
- Clifton College
- Eton College
- Haileybury College
- Harrow School
- Malvern College
- Marlborough College
- Radley College
- Rugby School
- St Paul's School
- Tonbridge School
- Wellington College
- Winchester College

== See also ==
- Lawn Tennis Association (Tennis)
- Squash Rackets Association (Squash and squash 57)
- Rugby School
