= Penny Fellows Lumley =

British tennis player

Penny Fellows Lumley (born 1963) is an English world real tennis singles and doubles champion. She is regarded as one of "the greatest female players in the history of tennis."

== Early life ==
Born Penny Bland, Lumley first played lawn tennis prior to taking up real tennis in 1985. Just four years later, she was the World Champion, beating British journalist and three-time World Champion Sally Jones in 1989 in Philadelphia.

== Career ==
Lumley secured a streak of victories between 1989 and 2004, including securing six out of eight World Championship titles (singles) (1989, 1991, 1995, 1997, 1999, 2003). In that same period, she played in every World Championship doubles final, winning six times (1993, 1995, 1997, 1999, 2001 and 2003) with various partners, including Evelyn David, Jo Wood Iddles, Sue Haswell and Fiona Deuchar. She won the doubles title in the 2007 World Championships in Manchester with her partner Charlotte Cornwallis.

She dominated the LRTA International tournament from its inception in 1998 through the next three tournaments. Penny was the British Open singles champion 12 times between 1989 and 2004, including an unbeaten run of eight victories from 1995 to 2002. She won the doubles title 10 times between 1991 and 2008. She was also successful abroad, winning the US Open (both singles and doubles) six times, the French Open singles seven times and the doubles 10 times, and the Australian Open singles three times. In 1996–1997 she won the Grand Slam, taking the British, French, American and Australian Opens, as well as the World singles and doubles titles.

Lumley continues to compete today. In 2014, she won the US Open Singles Title and the US Open Doubles title with her daughter Tara. She won the French Open Singles in 2015. Lumley also recently retained the Ladies' Masters Singles title.

== Awards ==
Lumley was the first female recipient of the Baerlein Cup bestowed by the Tennis and Rackets Association for the best tennis performance by an amateur. She was also the first woman to receive the Greenwood Trophy in 1989 for the most improved tennis player of the year.

In 1999, her achievements in tennis and her seven French Open singles titles were acknowledged with a Medal of the French Republic.

In 2000, she won the Unsung Hero/Heroine category and the overall Grand Prix Prize at the Best of British Awards for Great Sporting Achievement.

Lumley was inducted as a Member of the Most Excellent Order of the British Empire, MBE, in 2004. In 2011, she was inducted into the International Hall of Fame of the US Court Tennis Association, the second woman ever to receive this award. The award ceremony was held at the Racquet and Tennis Club.

== Personal life ==
Lumley has two children, Tara and John, who are also real tennis players.

Lumley is a founder honorary life member of Prested Hall.

Her hobbies include running.
