= Champions Trophy (real tennis) =

Tournament information
- Event name: Champions Trophy
- Founded: 2017; 9 years ago
- Editions: 6
- Location: London; United Kingdom
- Venue: Royal Tennis Court, Hampton Court
- Category: IRTPA
- Draw: 8S / 8Q
- Website: royaltenniscourt.com

Current champions (2025)
- Singles: (United Kingdom) John Lumley

The Champions Trophy is an annual real tennis tournament held at the Royal Tennis Court at Hampton Court Palace, London, England. It is a ranking point tournament for the purposes of qualifying for the Real Tennis World Championship. The event is the only professional real tennis tournament to feature a repechage system for the top four seeds after the first round.

The event was conceived as a season-end meeting of the top real tennis players in the world, bringing regular, high-quality tennis to oldest existing court in the world. The inaugural event was won by incumbent World Champion Camden Riviere. Both Riviere and Robert Fahey have won the event on two occasions. Ben Taylor-Matthews has been a finalist on four occasions. In 2024, the event expanded from 4 qualifiers to 8 qualifiers, and reduced the match format from best-of-5 sets to best-of-3 sets.

== Past finals ==
| Year | Champions | Runners-up | Score |
|---|---|---|---|
| 2017 | (United States) Camden Riviere | (United Kingdom) Ben Taylor-Matthews | 6/2 6/1 6/0 |
| 2018 | (United States) Camden Riviere | (Australia) Chris Chapman | 3/6 6/0 6/1 6/2 |
| 2019 | (Australia) Robert Fahey | (United Kingdom) John Lumley | 6/2 6/4 6/4 |
| 2020–2021 | Not held | | |
| 2022 | (Australia) Robert Fahey | (United Kingdom) Ben Taylor-Matthews | 6/2 4/6 6/2 6/3 |
| 2023 | (United Kingdom) John Lumley | (United Kingdom) Ben Taylor-Matthews | 6/2 6/4 6/4 |
| 2024 | (Australia) Nick Howell | (United Kingdom) Ben Taylor-Matthews | 3/6 6/2 6/4 |
| 2025 | (United Kingdom) John Lumley | (Australia) Nick Howell | 6/2 6/0 |
