= 2022 Champions Trophy (real tennis) =

- Date: 21-26 June
- Edition: 4th
- Category: IRTPA
- Draw: 8S / 4Q
- Location: Hampton Court Palace, London, United Kingdom
- Venue: Royal Tennis Court

Champions

Men's singles
- (Australia) Nick Howell
- Champions Trophy (real tennis)

The 2022 Champions Trophy was the 4th edition of the Champions Trophy. It was held at the Royal Tennis Court from 21 to 26 June It was a qualifying event for the 2023 Real Tennis World Championship. It was the first Champions Trophy held since 2019 due to the COVID-19 pandemic.

The tournament was won by defending champion and incumbent World Champion Robert Fahey. It was his second victory in the tournament. Ben Taylor-Matthews was the runner-up for the second time, having also been runner-up in the inaugural edition. The two finalists also met in the first round, with Fahey also the victor. World Championship challenger for 2022 Camden Riviere did not attend.

== Draw and results ==
Amateur players are marked as (A)

=== Qualifying ===
The qualifying was one group of four players, with the top two players progressing to the main draw.

		(United Kingdom) Williams	(United Kingdom) Smith	(United Kingdom) Mackenzie	(United Kingdom) Gale	W–L	Set W–L	Game W–L	Standings
7	(United Kingdom) L Williams		9/5	7/9	0/9	1–2	1–2 (33%)	16–23 (41%)	3rd
8	(United Kingdom) J Smith	5/9		6/9	2/9	0–3	0–3 (0%)	13–27 (33%)	4th
9	(United Kingdom) N Mackenzie (Q)	9/7	9/6		6/9	2–1	2–1 (67%)	24–22 (52%)	2nd
10	(United Kingdom) L Gale (Q)	9/5	9/2	9/6		3–0	3–0 (0%)	27–8 (77%)	1st

=== Main Draw ===
The Champions Trophy operates a repechage format for the first four seeds, where the first round losers progress to a second quarter final against the winners between the fifth and sixth seeds and the qualifiers.

First quarter finals
1	(Australia) R Fahey	6	3	6	6
3	(United Kingdom) B Taylor-Matthews	1	6	5	5
5	(United Kingdom) B Sayers	6	6	6
Q	(United Kingdom) N Mackenzie	2	1	2
6	(United Kingdom) D Long	6	5	6	5	6
Q	(United Kingdom) L Gale	5	6	2	6	2
4	(Australia) C Chapman	3	1	5
2	(United Kingdom) J Lumley	6	6	6

Second quarter finals
3	(United Kingdom) B Taylor-Matthews	6	6	6
5	(United Kingdom) B Sayers	3	4	0
6	(United Kingdom) D Long	3	2	2
4	(Australia) C Chapman	6	6	6

Semi finals
1	(Australia) R Fahey	6	6	6
4	(Australia) C Chapman	3	2	2
3	(United Kingdom) B Taylor-Matthews	6	6	6
2	(United Kingdom) J Lumley	5	1	5

Final
1	(Australia) R Fahey	6	4	6	6
3	(United Kingdom) B Taylor-Matthews	2	6	2	3
