= Real Tennis World Championship =

Premier competition in real tennis

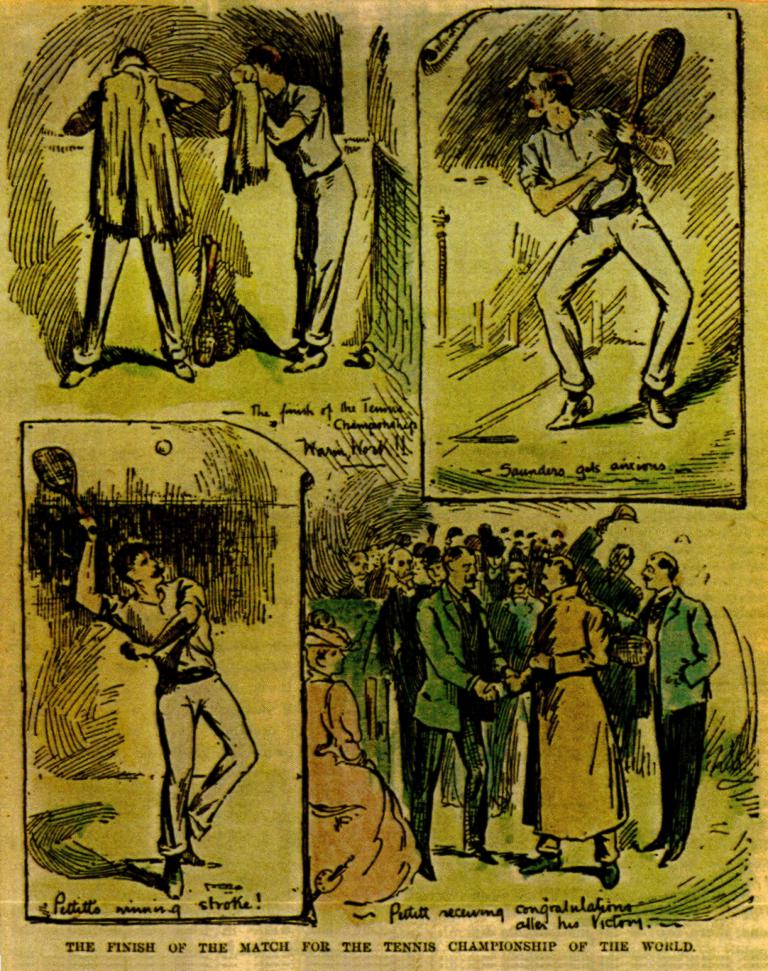
Men's singles championship, Dublin, 1890.

The Real Tennis World Championship is the premier competition in real tennis.

Men's singles in real tennis was the first world championship in any sport; it also predates the use of the term "real tennis," as the sport was called just "tennis" until lawn tennis gained popularity.

The first recorded champion was Clergé, The Elder in the 1740s.

== Start year ==
1. Men's singles: 1740
2. Men's doubles: 2001
3. Women's singles: 1985
4. Women's doubles: 1985

== Men's singles ==
This championship has always been on a challenge basis – the champion retains the title until losing an official challenge, except in cases where the champion has retired. Originally, the champion had the right to accept or reject a challenge, usually depending upon the prize money put up by the challenger's sponsor: several years could thus go by between challenge matches.

The top four ranked players in the world (excluding the champion himself) playoff for the right to challenge, with the champion and challenger playing a match of up to 13 sets over three days (4 sets, 4 sets and up to 5 sets on the final day). In theory, this is the only match the champion has to play in the two years since winning the last one.

The most recent men's world championship match was held in September 2025, with sets being played on 23 and 25 September (27 September, the scheduled third day, was unused) at the International Tennis Hall of Fame in Newport, Rhode Island

=== World men's singles champions ===
Year	Venue	Winner	Runner-Up	Scores	Notes
1740		(France) Clergé, The Elder			
1765		(France) Raymond Masson			
1785		(France) Joseph Barcellon			
1816	James Street, Haymarket	(Italy) (France) Marchisio	(United Kingdom) Philip Cox		
1819	James Street, Haymarket	(United Kingdom) Philip Cox	(France) Amédée Charrier		
1829	James Street, Haymarket	(France) Jacques Edmond Barre	(United Kingdom) Philip Cox		
1862	James Street, Haymarket	(United Kingdom) Edmund Tompkins	(France) Jacques Edmond Barre	1-0 (sets)	Barre retired due to injury
1871	N/A	(United Kingdom) George Lambert	N/A	N/A	claimed
1885	Hampton Court	(United States) Tom Pettitt	(United Kingdom) George Lambert	7-5 (sets)	
1890	St Stephens Green, Dublin	(United States) Tom Pettitt	(United Kingdom) Charles Saunders	7-2 (sets)	
1890	N/A	(United Kingdom) Charles Saunders	N/A	N/A	claimed
1895	Princes Club, Brighton	(United Kingdom) Peter Latham	(United Kingdom) Charles Saunders	7-2 (sets)	
1898	Princes Club, Brighton	(United Kingdom) Peter Latham	(United States) Tom Pettitt	7-0 (sets)	
1904	Princes Club, Brighton	(United Kingdom) Peter Latham	(United Kingdom) Cecil 'Punch' Fairs	7-4 (sets)	
1905	Queen's Club & Princes Club, Brighton	(United Kingdom) Cecil 'Punch' Fairs	(United Kingdom) Peter Latham	5-1 (sets)	
1906	Princes Club, Brighton	(United Kingdom) Cecil 'Punch' Fairs	(France) Ferdinand Garcin	7-4 (sets)	
1907	Princes Club, Brighton	(United Kingdom) Peter Latham	(United Kingdom) Cecil 'Punch' Fairs	7-3 (sets)	
1908	N/A	(United Kingdom) Cecil 'Punch' Fairs	N/A	N/A	claimed
1909	Princes Club, Brighton	(United Kingdom) Cecil 'Punch' Fairs	(United Kingdom) Ted Johnson	7-2 (sets)	
1910	Princes Club, Brighton	(United Kingdom) Cecil 'Punch' Fairs	(United Kingdom) Fred Covey	7-6 (sets)	
1912	Prince's Club, London	(United Kingdom) Fred Covey	(United Kingdom) Cecil 'Punch' Fairs	7-3 (sets)	
1914	Philadelphia	(United States) Jay Gould II	(United Kingdom) Fred Covey	7-1 (sets)	
1916	N/A	(United Kingdom) Fred Covey	N/A	N/A	claimed
1922	Prince's Club, London	(United Kingdom) Fred Covey	(United States) Walter Kinsella	7-3 (sets)	
1923	Prince's Club, London	(United Kingdom) Fred Covey	(United States) Walter Kinsella	7-1 (sets)	
1927	Prince's Club, London	(United Kingdom) Fred Covey	(France) Pierre Etchebaster	7-4 (sets)	
1928	Prince's Club, London	(France) Pierre Etchebaster	(United Kingdom) Fred Covey	7-3 (sets)	
1930	Prince's Club, London	(France) Pierre Etchebaster	(United States) Walter Kinsella	7-1 (sets)	
1937	Tuxedo Club	(France) Pierre Etchebaster	(United States) Ogden Phipps	3-1 (sets)	Phipps retired due to injury
1948	New York	(France) Pierre Etchebaster	(United States) Ogden Phipps	7-2 (sets)	
1948	New York	(France) Pierre Etchebaster	(United Kingdom) Jim Dear	7-4 (sets)	
1949	New York	(France) Pierre Etchebaster	(United States) Ogden Phipps	7-1 (sets)	
1950	New York	(France) Pierre Etchebaster	(United States) Alastair Martin	7-0 (sets)	
1952	New York	(France) Pierre Etchebaster	(United States) Alastair Martin	7-2 (sets)	
1955	New York & Queen's Club	(United Kingdom) Jim Dear	(United Kingdom) Albert "Jack" Johnson	11-10 (sets)	
1957	Queen's Club	(United Kingdom) Albert "Jack" Johnson	(United Kingdom) Jim Dear	7-3 (sets)	
1959	New York	(United States) Northrup R. Knox	(United Kingdom) Albert "Jack" Johnson	7-2 (sets)	
1966	New York	(United States) Northrup R. Knox	(United Kingdom) Ronald Hughes	7-0 (sets)	
1968	New York	(United States) Northrup R. Knox	(United States) Pete Bostwick Jr.	7-2 (sets)	
1969	New York & Manchester	(United States) Pete Bostwick Jr.	(United Kingdom) Frank Willis	11-8 (sets)	
1970	New York	(United States) Pete Bostwick Jr.	(United States) Jimmy Bostwick	7-1 (sets)	
1972	New York	(United States) Jimmy Bostwick	(United States) Pete Bostwick Jr.	7-2 (sets)	
1974	New York	(United States) Jimmy Bostwick	(United Kingdom) Howard Angus	7-5 (sets)	
1976	New York & Queen's Club	(United Kingdom) Howard Angus	(United States) Eugene Scott	11-4 (sets)	
1977	Hampton Court	(United Kingdom) Howard Angus	(United States) Eugene Scott	7-2 (sets)	
1979	Hampton Court	(United Kingdom) Howard Angus	(United Kingdom) Chris Ronaldson	7-0 (sets)	
1981	Queen's Club	(United Kingdom) Chris Ronaldson	(United Kingdom) Howard Angus	6-1 (sets)	Angus retired due to injury
1983	Hampton Court	(United Kingdom) Chris Ronaldson	(Australia) Wayne Davies	7-4 (sets)	
1985	Queen's Club	(United Kingdom) Chris Ronaldson	(Australia) Wayne Davies	7-1 (sets)	
1987	Queen's Club	(Australia) Wayne Davies	(United Kingdom) Chris Ronaldson	7-4 (sets)	
1988	New York	(Australia) Wayne Davies	(Australia) Lachlan Deuchar	7-1 (sets)	
1991	New York	(Australia) Wayne Davies	(Australia) Lachlan Deuchar	7-4 (sets)	
1993	New York	(Australia) Wayne Davies	(Australia) Lachlan Deuchar	7-6 (sets)	
1994	Hobart & New York	(Australia) Robert Fahey	(Australia) Wayne Davies	9-5 (sets)	
1995	Hobart	(Australia) Robert Fahey	(Australia) Wayne Davies	6-2 (sets)	Davies retired due to injury
1996	Melbourne	(Australia) Robert Fahey	(Australia) Wayne Davies	7-1 (sets)	
1998	Melbourne	(Australia) Robert Fahey	(United Kingdom) Julian Snow	7-4 (sets)	
2000	Hobart	(Australia) Robert Fahey	(Australia) Wayne Davies	7-0 (sets)	
2002	Hampton Court	(Australia) Robert Fahey	(United States) Tim Chisholm	7-6 (sets)	
2004	Newport, Rhode Island	(Australia) Robert Fahey	(United States) Tim Chisholm	7-1 (sets)	
2006	Oratory	(Australia) Robert Fahey	(United States) Tim Chisholm	7-0 (sets)	
2008	Fontainebleau	(Australia) Robert Fahey	(United States) Camden Riviere	7-5 (sets)	
2010	Melbourne	(Australia) Robert Fahey	(Australia) Steve Virgona	7-2 (sets)	
2012	Queen's Club	(Australia) Robert Fahey	(Australia) Steve Virgona	7-3 (sets)	
2014	Melbourne	(Australia) Robert Fahey	(United States) Camden Riviere	7-3 (sets)	
2016	Newport, Rhode Island	(United States) Camden Riviere	(Australia) Robert Fahey	7-2 (sets)	
2018	Queen's Club	(Australia) Robert Fahey	(United States) Camden Riviere	7-5 (sets)	
2022	Prested Hall	(United States) Camden Riviere	(Australia) Robert Fahey	7-5 (sets)	
2023	Vienna, Virginia	(United States) Camden Riviere	(United Kingdom) John Lumley	7-3 (sets)	
2025	Newport, Rhode Island	(United States) Camden Riviere	(United Kingdom) John Lumley	7-1 (sets)	

== Men's doubles ==
The men's doubles title is earned in a tournament with the sport's four top-ranked pairings (changed down from eight in 2022). Competed every odd-numbered year, it is hosted in rotation among the countries with active courts in the following order: the United Kingdom, Australia, France, and the United States. The championship match uses a best of nine sets format.

After the first championship was won by Tim Chisholm and Julian Snow, the title was won and then defended five times by singles world champion Rob Fahey and Steve Virgona. They lost their title in the final set of the final match in 2015, in a championship held at Prested Hall (UK).

The title now belongs to Camden Riviere and Tim Chisholm.

Year	Venue	Winners	Runners-Up	Scores	Notes
2001	Middlesex University	(United States) Tim Chisholm/ (United Kingdom) Julian Snow	(Australia) Steve Virgona/ (United Kingdom) Ruraidh Gunn	5-1 (sets)	
2003	Hobart	(Australia) Robert Fahey/ (Australia) Steve Virgona	(United States) Tim Chisholm/ (United States) Josh Bainton	5-0 (sets)	
2005	Fontainebleau	(Australia) Robert Fahey/ (Australia) Steve Virgona	(United Kingdom) David Woodman/ (United Kingdom) Neil Roxburgh	5-0 (sets)	
2007	Boston	(Australia) Robert Fahey/ (Australia) Steve Virgona	(United States) Tim Chisholm/ (United States) Camden Riviere	5-3 (sets)	
2009	Seacourt	(Australia) Robert Fahey/ (Australia) Steve Virgona	(United Kingdom) Bryn Sayers/ (United Kingdom) Ricardo Smith	5-0 (sets)	
2011	Melbourne	(Australia) Robert Fahey/ (Australia) Steve Virgona	(United Kingdom) Ben Taylor-Matthews/ (United Kingdom) Julian Snow	5-0 (sets)	
2013	Paris	(Australia) Robert Fahey/ (Australia) Steve Virgona	(United States) Tim Chisholm/ (United States) Camden Riviere	5-4 (sets)	
2015	Tuxedo	(United States) Tim Chisholm/ (United States) Camden Riviere	(Australia) Robert Fahey/ (Australia) Steve Virgona	5-0 (sets)	
2017	Prested Hall	(United States) Tim Chisholm/ (United States) Camden Riviere	(Australia) Robert Fahey/ (United Kingdom) Ricardo Smith	5-4 (sets)	
2019	Hobart	(United States) Tim Chisholm/ (United States) Camden Riviere	(Australia) Robert Fahey/ (Australia) Nick Howell	5-1 (sets)	
2022	Bordeaux	(United States) Tim Chisholm/ (United States) Camden Riviere	(United Kingdom) John Lumley/ (Australia) Steve Virgona	6/4 6/3 6/3 6/4 2/6 3/6 6/4	
2024	Chicago	(United States) Tim Chisholm/ (United States) Camden Riviere	(United Kingdom) John Lumley/ (Australia) Steve Virgona	5-2 (sets)	
2026	Moreton Morrell	(United States) Tim Chisholm/ (United States) Camden Riviere	(United Kingdom) John Lumley/ (Australia) Steve Virgona	5-3 (sets)	

== Women's singles ==
Unlike the men's singles title, the women's title is earned in a tournament: the title holder must win her way through the draw for the right to defend the championship.

The championship tournament is held every odd-numbered year. Since 2011, the title has been held by Claire Fahey (née Vigrass).

Year	Venue	Winner	Runner-Up	Scores
1985	Melbourne	(Australia) Judith Clarke	(United Kingdom) Lesley Ronaldson	2-1 (sets)
1987	Seacourt	(Australia) Judith Clarke	(United Kingdom) Katrina Allen	2-0 (sets)
1989	Philadelphia	(United Kingdom) Penny Fellows	(United Kingdom) Sally Jones	2-1 (sets)
1991	Hobart	(United Kingdom) Penny Lumley (née Fellows)	(United Kingdom) Sally Jones	2-1 (sets)
1993	Bordeaux	(United Kingdom) Sally Jones	(United Kingdom) Charlotte Cornwallis	5/6 6/2 6/3
1995	Newport	(United Kingdom) Penny Lumley (née Fellows)	(United Kingdom) Sue Haswell	2-1 (sets)
1997	Ballarat	(United Kingdom) Penny Lumley (née Fellows)	(United Kingdom) Sue Haswell	2-0 (sets)
1999	Hampton Court	(United Kingdom) Penny Lumley (née Fellows)	(United Kingdom) Sue Haswell	2-1 (sets)
2001	Washington	(United Kingdom) Charlotte Cornwallis	(United Kingdom) Penny Lumley (née Fellows)	2-0 (sets)
2003	Melbourne	(United Kingdom) Penny Lumley (née Fellows)	(United Kingdom) Charlotte Cornwallis	2-0 (sets)
2005	Paris	(United Kingdom) Charlotte Cornwallis	(United Kingdom) Jo Iddles	2-0 (sets)
2007	Manchester	(United Kingdom) Charlotte Cornwallis	(United Kingdom) Penny Lumley (née Fellows)	2-0 (sets)
2009	Newport	(United Kingdom) Charlotte Cornwallis	(United Kingdom) Karen Hird	2-0 (sets)
2011	Melbourne	(United Kingdom) Claire Vigrass	(United Kingdom) Karen Hird	2-0 (sets)
2013	Paris	(United Kingdom) Claire Vigrass	(United Kingdom) Sarah Vigrass	2-0 (sets)
2015	Leamington	(United Kingdom) Claire Fahey (née Vigrass)	(United Kingdom) Sarah Vigrass	2-0 (sets)
2017	Tuxedo	(United Kingdom) Claire Fahey (née Vigrass)	(United Kingdom) Sarah Vigrass	2-0 (sets)
2019	Ballarat	(United Kingdom) Claire Fahey (née Vigrass)	(United Kingdom) Isabel Candy	2-0 (sets)
2022	Fontainebleau	(United Kingdom) Claire Fahey (née Vigrass)	(France) Lea van der Zwalmen	2-0 (sets)
2023	Oratory	(United Kingdom) Claire Fahey (née Vigrass)	(France) Lea van der Zwalmen	2-0 (sets)
2025	Newport	(United Kingdom) Claire Fahey (née Vigrass)	(France) Lea van der Zwalmen	6-0 6-2 6-0

== Women's doubles ==
The women's doubles world championship is held at the same time and venue as the women's singles championship. It is also a tournament format, rather than a challenge.

Year	Venue	Winner	Runner-Up	Scores
1985	Melbourne	(Australia) Judith Clarke/Ann Link	(United Kingdom) Lesley Ronaldson/ (Australia) Karen Toates	2-0 (sets)
1987	Seacourt	(United Kingdom) Lesley Ronaldson/ (United Kingdom) Katrina Allen	(Australia) Judith Clarke/ (Australia) Jane Hyland	2-0 (sets)
1989	Philadelphia	(United Kingdom) Sally Jones/ (United Kingdom) Alex Garside	(United Kingdom) Katrina Allen/ (United Kingdom) Penny Fellows	2-1 (sets)
1991	Hobart	(United Kingdom) Sally Jones/ (United Kingdom) Alex Garside	(United Kingdom) Penny Lumley/ (Australia) Helen Mursell	2-0 (sets)
1993	Bordeaux	(United Kingdom) Charlotte Cornwallis/ (United Kingdom) Penny Lumley	(United Kingdom) Sally Jones/ (United Kingdom) Alex Garside	6/0 6/4
1995	Newport, Rhode Island	(United Kingdom) Sue Haswell/ (United Kingdom) Penny Lumley	(United Kingdom) Sally Jones/ (United Kingdom) Lesley Ronaldson	2-1 (sets)
1997	Ballarat	(United Kingdom) Sue Haswell/ (United Kingdom) Penny Lumley	(United Kingdom) Fiona Deuchar/ (Australia) Kate Leeming	2-0 (sets)
1999	Hampton Court	(United Kingdom) Sue Haswell/ (United Kingdom) Penny Lumley	(United Kingdom) Alex Garside/ (United Kingdom) Sally Jones	2-1 (sets)
2001	Washington	(United Kingdom) Jo Iddles/ (United Kingdom) Penny Lumley	(United Kingdom) Alex Garside/ (United Kingdom) Charlotte Cornwallis	2-1 (sets)
2003	Melbourne	(United Kingdom) Jo Wood (née Iddles)/ (United Kingdom) Penny Lumley	(United Kingdom) Alex Garside/ (Australia) Kate Leeming	2-1 (sets)
2005	Paris	(United Kingdom) Charlotte Cornwallis/ (United Kingdom) Sue Haswell	(United States) Frederika Adam/ (Australia) Susay Castley	2-0 (sets)
2007	Manchester	(United Kingdom) Charlotte Cornwallis/ (United Kingdom) Penny Lumley	(United Kingdom) Sue Haswell/ (Australia) Kate Leeming	2-0 (sets)
2009	Newport, Rhode Island	(United Kingdom) Charlotte Cornwallis/ (United Kingdom) Karen Hird	(Australia) Amy Hayball/ (United Kingdom) Juliette Lambert	2-0 (sets)
2011	Melbourne	(United Kingdom) Claire Vigrass/ (United Kingdom) Sarah Vigrass	(United Kingdom) Karen Hird/ (Australia) Rosie Snell	2-0 (sets)
2013	Paris	(United Kingdom) Claire Vigrass/ (United Kingdom) Sarah Vigrass	(United Kingdom) Penny Lumley/ (United Kingdom) Tara Lumley	2-0 (sets)
2015	Leamington	(United Kingdom) Claire Fahey (née Vigrass)/ (United Kingdom) Sarah Vigrass	(United Kingdom) Penny Lumley/ (United Kingdom) Tara Lumley	2-0 (sets)
2017	Tuxedo Club	(United Kingdom) Claire Fahey (née Vigrass)/ (United Kingdom) Sarah Vigrass	(United States) Amanda Avedissian/ (Netherlands) Saskia Bollerman	2-0 (sets)
2019	Ballarat	(United Kingdom) Claire Fahey (née Vigrass)/ (United Kingdom) Tara Lumley	(United Kingdom) Penny Lumley/ (Australia) Kate Leeming	2-0 (sets)
2022	Fontainebleau	(United Kingdom) Claire Fahey (née Vigrass)/ (United Kingdom) Sarah Vigrass	(Netherlands) Saskia Bollerman/ (United Kingdom) Isabel Candy	2-0 (sets)
2023	Oratory	(United Kingdom) Claire Fahey (née Vigrass)/ (United Kingdom) Tara Lumley	(France) Lea van der Zwalmen/ (Netherlands) Saskia Bollerman	2-0 (sets)
2025	Newport	(United Kingdom) Claire Fahey (née Vigrass)/ (United Kingdom) Tara Lumley	(France) Lea van der Zwalmen/ (France) Margaux Randjbar	6-2 6-4 6-3

== See also ==
- Grand Slam (real tennis)
- Rackets World Championships
- Jeu de paume
- Longue paume
- Padel World Championship
- 2025 FIP calendar
