= 2000 Real Tennis World Championship =

- Date: 24-26 February 2000
- Edition: 63rd
- Location: Hobart, Tasmania
- Venue: Hobart Real Tennis Club

Champions

Men's singles
- (Australia) Robert Fahey
- Real Tennis World Championship

The 2000 Real Tennis World Championship was the 63rd edition of the real tennis World Championship. It was held at the Hobart Real Tennis Club in Tasmania, Australia. Incumbent champion Robert Fahey defended his title against former champion Wayne Davies seven sets to zero. It was Fahey's fifth victory at the World Championship, placing him equal second for the number of World Championship victories Pierre Etchebaster, level with Cecil Fairs. It was the first time since 1979 that the challenger had failed to win a set, and would be the last time that Davies challenged for the title.

== Qualification ==
As the defending champion, Robert Fahey automatically qualified to the World Championship Challenge. Fahey would make his fifth appearance at the World Championship, having held the title continuously since 1994.

To qualify to challenge for the World Championship, players needed to win one of the four National Opens in the 1998 and 1999 seasons. Fahey himself won the Australian Open in 1998 Australian Open and the French Open in both 1998 and 1999. Three players qualified to challenge Fahey:

- (United Kingdom) Julian Snow, 1998 British Open winner
- (United Kingdom) Wayne Davies, 1999 US Open winner
- (United Kingdom) Chris Bray, 1998 US Open winner; 1999 Australian Open winner
- (United Kingdom) James Male, 1999 British Open winner

Of the four qualified, only Davies and Bray elected to travel to Hobart to play in the Eliminator series.

Bray challenged for the World Championship for the third time. In his first appearance in 1995, he won through eliminators against Julian Snow and Lachlan Deuchar, but lost to Wayne Davies in the Final Eliminator. He next appeared in 1998, but lost in the First Round Eliminator to Snow. He won the 1999 Australian Open during the qualifying period, completing a career grand slam.

Davies had previously held won the World Championship on four occasions between 1987 and 1993. He unsuccessfully challenged Chris Ronaldson twice in 1983 and 1985, and had re-challenged Fahey on three previous occasions between 1994 and 1996. He failed to qualify for the Eliminators in 1998. He qualified by winning the 1999 US Open, the 16th and final Open title of his career.

== Venue ==
As the defending champion Robert Fahey had the right to choose the time and place for the Challenge. Fahey opted to defend his title at his native club of the Hobart Real Tennis Club, where he won the title for the first time in 1994. It would be the third time that Hobart had hosted the challenge, with Fahey successfully defending his title in 1995. It would be the fifth consecutive, and fifth total, Challenge held in Australia. Hobart also hosted the Final Eliminator.

== Eliminators ==
The two qualified players played an Eliminator match in Hobart in February 2000. The format was best of 13 sets across three days, the same format as the Challenge itself.

Bray took a 3-1 lead in sets on the first day. Bray found early success forcing at the dedans, building and maintaining a lead through the first set as both players were noted for impressive tambour play. The first few games of the second set were evenly exchanged before Davies pulled out a narrow 4-2 lead. Bray responded with more dedans hitting, bringing the set to 5-all. The final game saw the pair duelling their backhands, before Bray took the set with a main wall dedans. Both players were laying short chases in the third set, with Bray extending a 4-0 lead on the back of errors from Davies. Davies then lifted his game, winning the next six games straight and taking the third set. Bray was the stronger in the fast-paced fourth set, with Bray continuing his power game and ending the day with an ace.

Davies began the second day intending to make Bray run as much as possible, utilising all the angles of the court. Bray continued his forcing game, taking the first set easily 6/2. The sixth set was evenly poised, neither player extending a lead throughout. Bray reached set point in the final game, but Davies closed the set 6/5. Davies strategy appeared to be working in the seventh set, as Bray appeared to tire. He took the seventh set 6/3. However, at the start of the eighth set, Davies made some unexpected errors and allowed Bray an early lead. He had enough to hold on through the set and went into the final day leading 5-3 in sets.

Davies entered the final day needing to win four of five sets. As such, he changed his approach, playing with severe cut off both the back wall and the volley. He was able to starve Bray of targets, winning the first set of the day 6/3. The tenth set saw momentum swing back and forth, with Bray leading 4-1, then Davies responding 5-4. In the final game, Bray held three set points attacking better than 2 chase. Bray could only manage a chase off, before a couple of errors took the game to deuce. Davies defending another set point into the grille, before winning the set on his third set point. From there, Davies dominated the remainder of the match, dominating the last two sets and winning the last three games dropping only two points. By winning the match, he qualified for his tenth World Championship final.

Final Eliminator
Hobart Real Tennis Club, 9, 11, 13 February 2000
(United Kingdom) Chris Bray | 6 | 6 | 4 | 6 | 6 | 5 | 3 | 6 | 3 | 5 | 3 | 3 | 5
(United Kingdom) Wayne Davies | 4 | 5 | 6 | 1 | 3 | 6 | 6 | 3 | 6 | 6 | 6 | 6 | 7

== Match ==
The format for the Challenge was best of thirteen sets played over three days. Four sets were scheduled for the first two days, and up to five sets on the final day.

=== Day 1 ===
The first day was delayed by two days at the request of Wayne Davies. Once play got underway, Fahey relentlessly targeted the dedans, hitting 25 over the course of the day. Davies was content to exchange in long rallies with Fahey, but could not find winners of his own, not utilising his strong attacking volley or force. Davies did not make many unforced errors, but was no match for Fahey's strength, skill and stamina. Davies managed just five games across the four sets played in the day.

=== Day 2 ===
Davies began the day on the attack, striking several forces aimed at the dedans. But through the fifth set he either struck them into the net or they were successfully defended by Fahey, who riposted into attacking shots of his own. The sixth set was the closest of the match, and the only one where Davies won more than two games. Davies attack was more accurate, but Fahey's often more devastating. The set went to a deciding game, but Fahey's forcing was sufficient to win it to love. Fahey dominated the return of serve as Davies's play became more and more erratic. He finished the match in the seventh set, the first time the challenger had failed to win a set since 1979.

== Result ==
World Championship Challenge
Hobart Real Tennis Club, 24, 26, February 2000
(Australia) Robert Fahey | 6 | 6 | 6 | 6 | 6 | 6 | 6 | 7
(Australia) Wayne Davies | 2 | 2 | 0 | 1 | 1 | 5 | 2 | 0

| Preceded by Melbourne; 1996 | Real Tennis World Championship; Hobart; 2000 | Succeeded by Royal Tennis Court; 2002 |
