= Jeu de Paume de Paris =

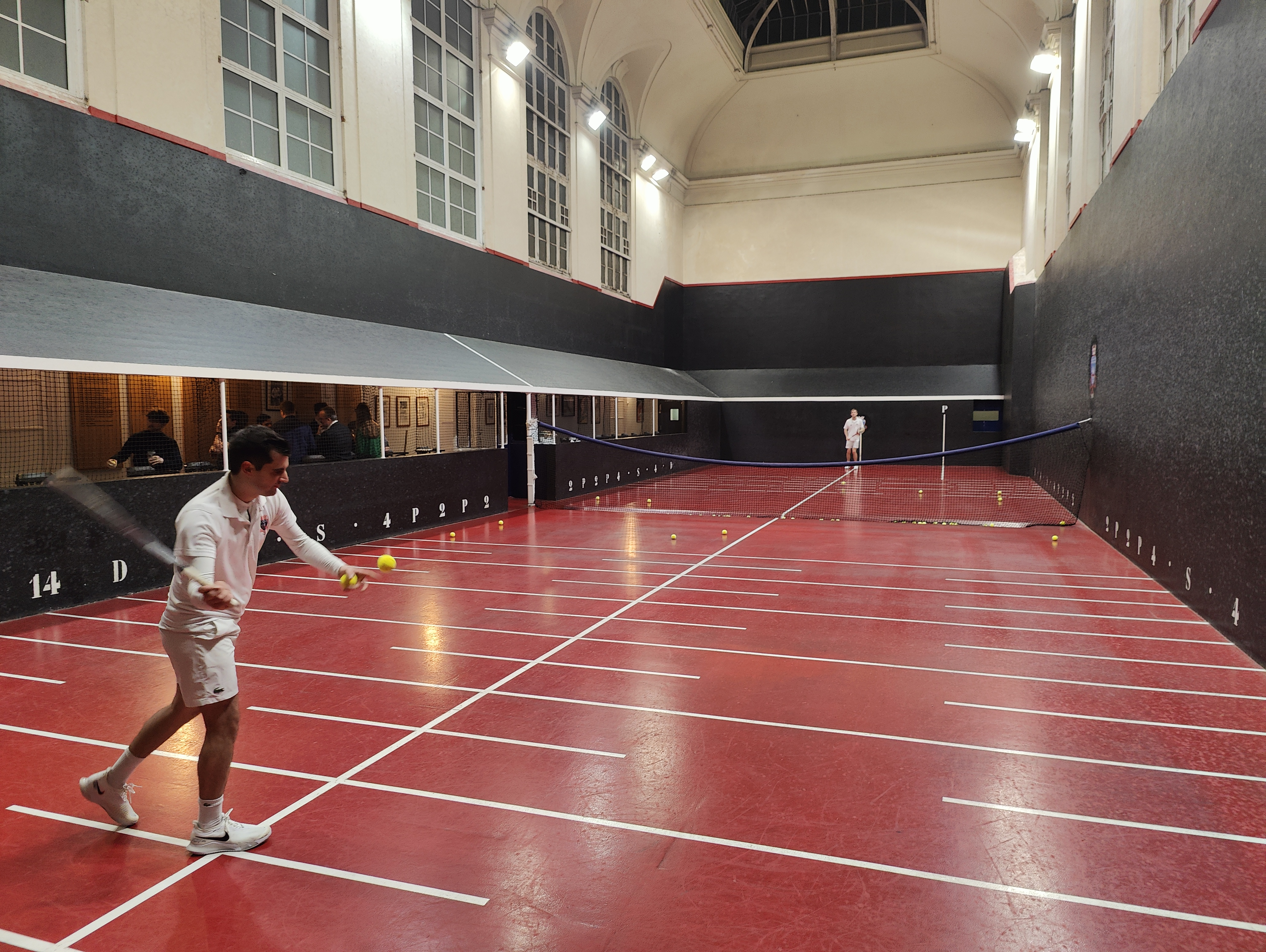
- Match in play during the French Open

- Location within Paris
- Full name: Société Sportive du Jeu de Paume et de Racquets
- Address: 74 Rue Lauriston; Paris; France
- Coordinates: 48.86840°N 2.28868°E
- Type: Real tennis and squash club

Construction
- Built: 1908
- Opened: 1909
- Expanded: 1927 (squash courts added)
- Cost: 200,000 Fr
- Architect: Jules Vieux

Website
- squashjeudepaume.com

The Jeu de Paume de Paris also known as the Société Sportive du Jeu de Paume et de Racquets is a real tennis and squash private members' club on Rue Lauriston in the 16th arrondissement of Paris. It is one of three active real tennis courts in France, and the only one remaining in Paris. The current club was built in 1908 having relocated from the court in the Tuileries Garden, the latter converted into an art gallery. Initially built as two real tennis courts, the northern court was converted into four squash courts in 1927. The club hosted the real tennis World Doubles Championships in 2013 and the real tennis Women's World Championships in 2005 and 2013. It has hosted the real tennis French Open annually since 1992, one of the four major national Opens for the sport.

== History ==
In the 16th century, there was an estimated 250 tennis courts in Paris. This number decreased to twelve by 1787 as many were converted into theatres and hotels. The remainder were closed following the French Revolution. The last was transformed into the Théâtre Déjazet, closing to real tennis in 1839. A new court was opened by subscription of active tennis players in 1840, but only lasted until 1861 as it was closed in order to build the Opéra Garnier. Emperor Napoleon III granted the members to rebuild at the Tuileries Garden facing the Place de la Concorde, with construction taking just under a year and costing 200,000 Francs. The Tuileries court opened in January, 1862. An extension with a second court was built in 1879. However, the lease of the court was not renewed by the French Third Republic, with the building converted into a museum, closing to real tennis in 1907.

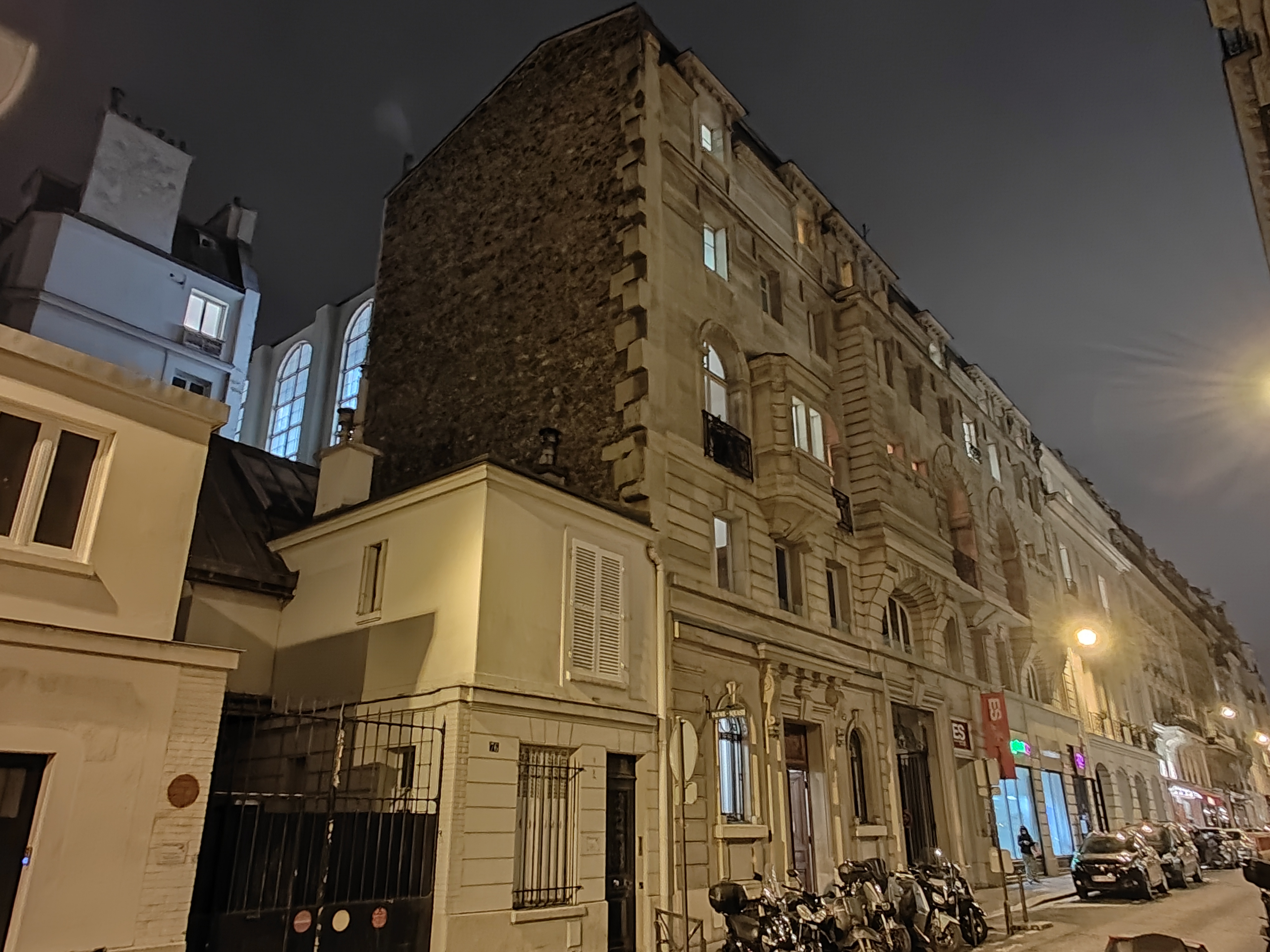
The club from Rue Lauriston

The club acquired land on the Rue Lauriston in 1907, designed by architect Jules Vieux. The club was designed with an empty ground floor, billiard rooms and changing rooms on the first floor and the courts on the second floor, following the design of the Racquet and Tennis Club in New York. The height of the court was necessary in order to provide sufficient external lighting for playing tennis. The court features large clerestory windows and glass roofs. The club was opened in 1909. Matches were regularly played against other clubs in Bordeaux and Pau, until the building was closed during World War I.

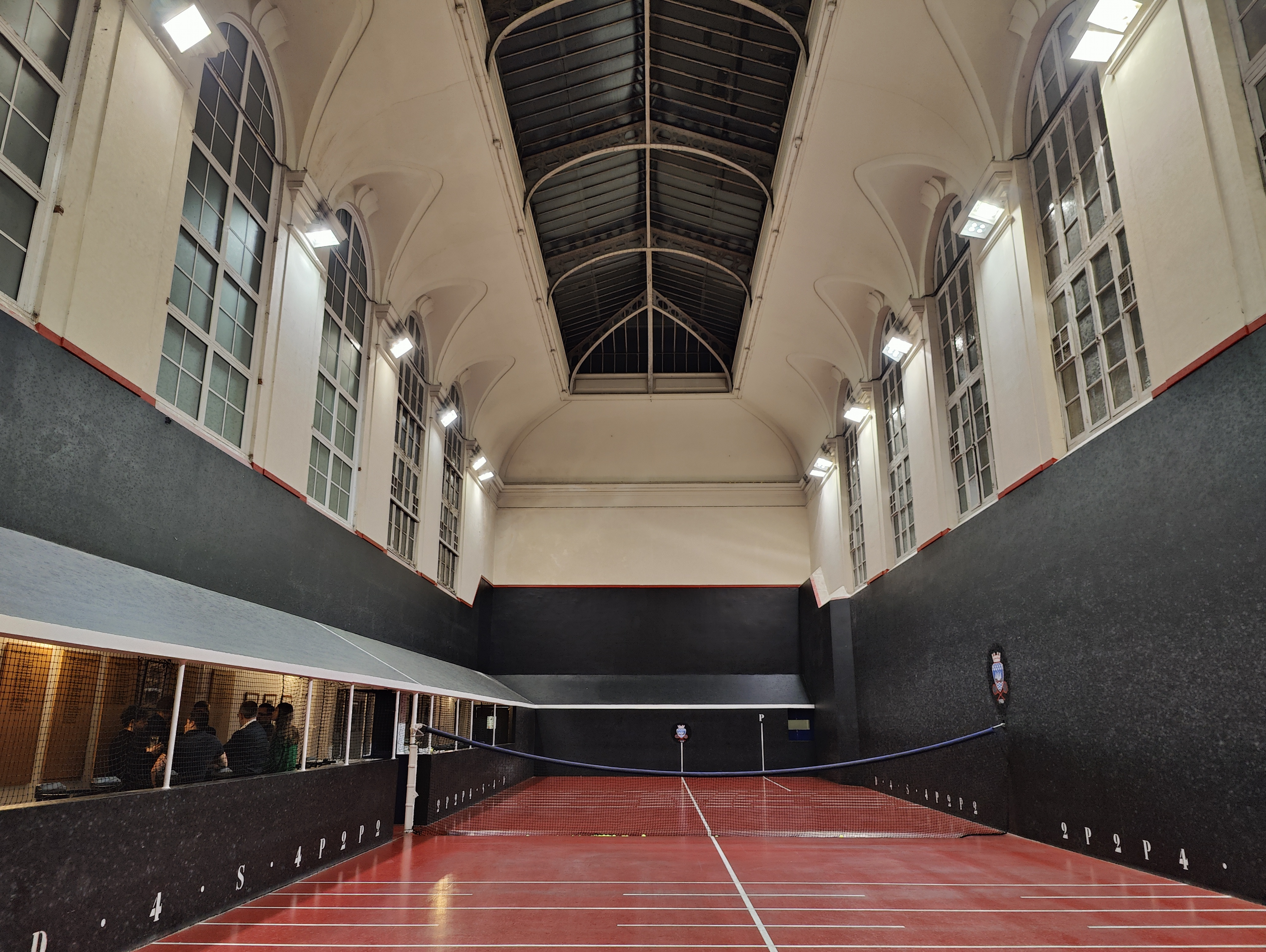
Interior of the real tennis court

A tour of French clubs by members of the Queen's Club, London in 1920 provided the impetus for reopening the court, as well as the founding of the Bathurst Cup, a competition between teams representing nations. The club employed basque pelota champion Pierre Etchebaster in 1921 as a professional, becoming head professional in 1925. Etchebaster challenged Fred Covey for the Real Tennis World Championship in 1927 at Prince's Club, London. Although he lost his first challenge, he challenged again successfully in 1928 and held the title continuously until 1954. Etchebaster left Paris for the Racquet and Tennis Club in New York in 1930.

In 1927, in an attempt to broaden the membership and appeal to British and American visiting players, the club renovated the northern court into four squash courts, one offset slightly due to the presence of the tambour on the old real tennis court. The remaining space has since been converted into a gym and additional changing facilities. The addition of the squash courts triggered the club to add "et rackets" to its name.

During the Vichy government in Paris during World War II, real tennis activities ceased again, and in the following years the club was mostly frequented by British and American expatriates playing squash. In 1975, the French Tennis Federation assumed governance of both real tennis and squash, creating new national committees for both sports headquartered at the Rue Lauriston courts. The former, the Comité Français de Courte-Paume is still based at the club. At this time, the squash courts were renovated to meet the new international standards, including the installation of glass back walls and spectator stands overlooking the courts. The result was an increase in membership from 75 in 1961 to 300 since 1981.

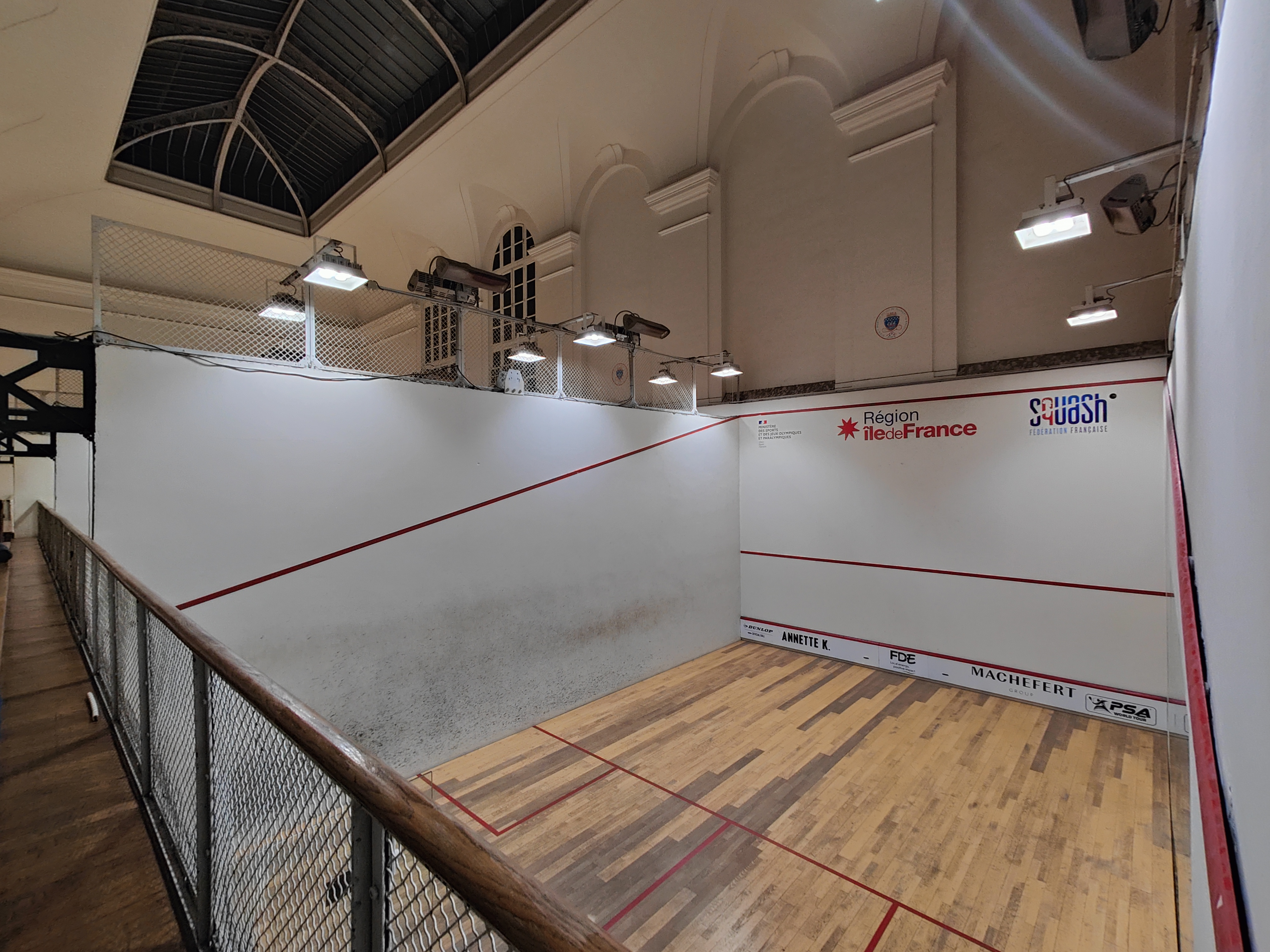
Squash courts at the club

With the growing squash membership, the club created the Perrier International Squash Open in 1988, won by World No. 1 Jansher Khan. The tournament ran for three years before moving to a larger venue. In 1992, the real tennis French Open moved from Bordeaux to Paris, where it has since been held annually. In 1998, the real tennis court was refurbished, followed by a refurbishment of the changing rooms in 1999. For the club's centenary in 2008, the women's changing room was relocated enabling an expansion to the bar and installation of a glass wall on the no. 1 squash court. The club hosted the women's Real Tennis World Championship for the first time in 2005. Charlotte Cornwallis won the singles championship, and paired with Sue Haswell to win the doubles. The Championship would return in 2013, with Claire Fahey winning the singles and partnering her sister Sarah Vigrass to win the doubles. The club also hosted the World Doubles Championships in 2013 in lieu of the French Open Doubles. It was won by defending champions Robert Fahey and Steve Virgona, their last victory together as a pair. In 2018, the club was visited by Prince Edward, Earl of Wessex as part of his tour of all active real tennis courts in the world.

== Tournaments ==
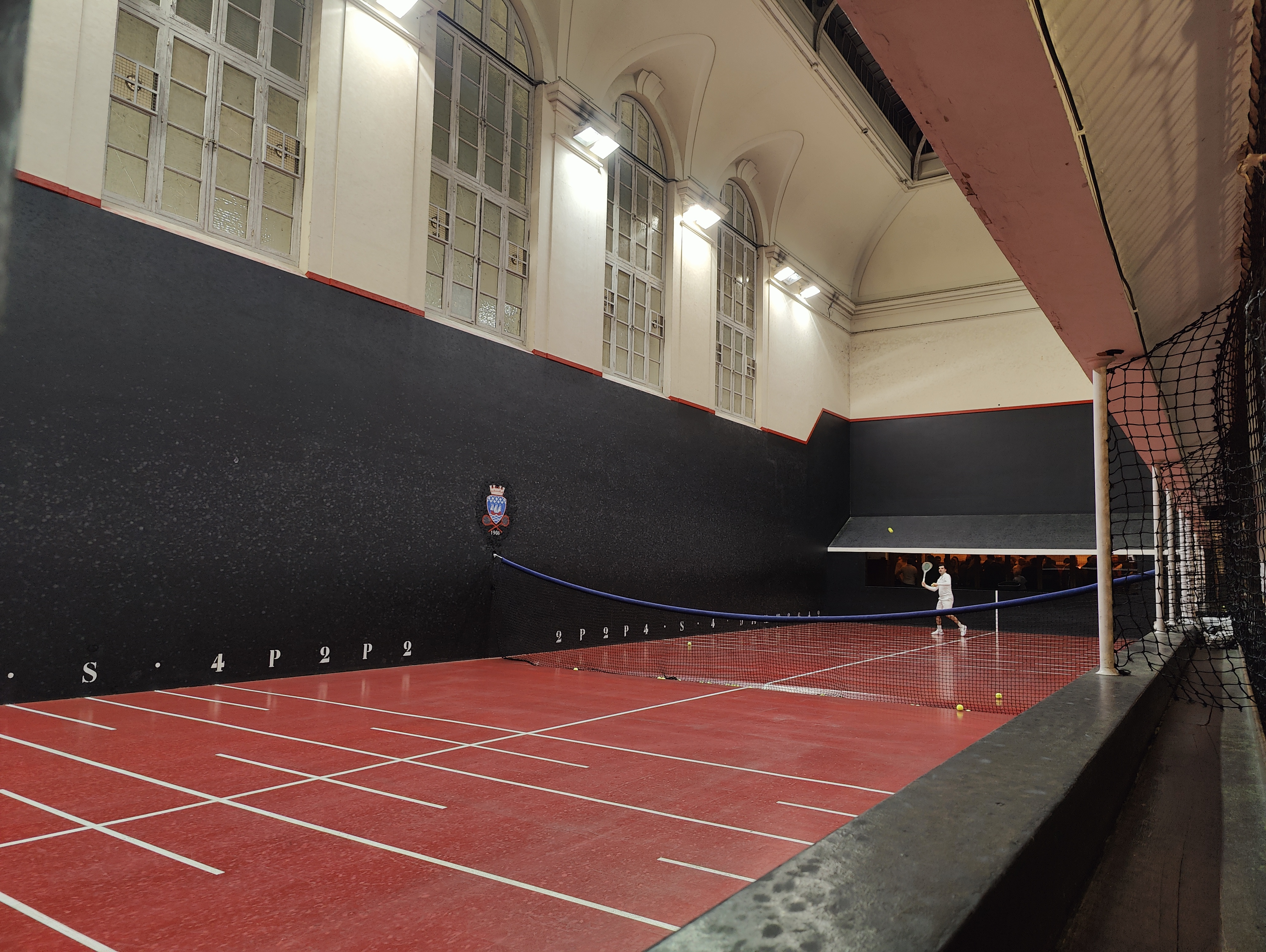
A match in progress at the French Open

The premier real tennis tournament at the club for amateurs and professionals is the French Open, attracting the best players from around the world. The tournament was first hosted in 1990, and is held every year in late September. For French amateurs real tennis players, the marquee event is the Raquette d'Or, first established in 1899 and held annually since. The second division tournament, the Raquette d'Argent was also established in 1899. The Raquette de Bronze and the Raquette de Laiton, the third and fourth division tournaments, have been held since 1970. More recently, the club has hosted the Coupe de Thélème, an international third division Open tournament.

In squash, the premier event is the Batch Open, a Professional Squash Association Challenger 12 tournament. In the past, the club has hosted the Open de Paris. The club also regularly hosts tournaments for members.

== Professionals ==
Year	Head Real Tennis Professional	Head Squash Professional	Assistant Professionals
1908	Charles Lesueur	vacant	Georges Lutz; Émile Planet; Ferdinand Garcin
1916	Ferdinand Garcin	vacant	Georges Cott; Pierre Etchebaster
1925	Pierre Etchebaster	vacant	Robert Desmet
1929	Robert Desmet	vacant	vacant
1932	Émile Planet		vacant
1958	Émile Planet	Roger Masip	vacant
1961	Laredo Masip		vacant
2005	Gerard Eden	Danny Mandil	vacant
2007	Matthew Ronaldson	Danny Mandil	vacant
2008	Angus Williams	Danny Mandil	Adrian Kemp
2010	Adrian Kemp	Danny Mandil	Rod McNaughtan; Johan Bouquet
2013	Angus Williams	Danny Mandil	Johan Bouquet
2015	Rod McNaughtan	Danny Mandil	Johan Bouquet
2019	Rod McNaughtan	Johan Bouquet	Sohail Khan

== Presidents ==
Year	President
1907	Robert Jameson
1929	Spencer Eddy
1942	Pierre du Pasquier
1962	Francisco Alvarez
1984	Guy Quennouelle
1997	Gerard Welker
2006	Gil Kressmann
2009	Wesley Johnson
2012	Pierre Heitzmann
2016	Julien Nebenzahl
2019	Ivan Semenoff

== Bibliography ==
- Demory & Kressman (August 2021). The History of the Jeu de Paume Club in Paris 1840-2020. Editions Saxo. ISBN 9782919260119.
