= 1998 British Open (real tennis) =

- Date: 14-24 November (men's); 22–26 April (women's singles); 5–7 September (women's doubles)
- Edition: 19th
- Draw: 24S / 16D
- Location: West Kensington, London, United Kingdom (men's); Holyport, Berkshire, United Kingdom (women's singles); Canford Magna, Dorset, United Kingdom (women's doubles)
- Venue: Queen's Club (men's); Holyport Real Tennis Club (women's singles); Canford School (women's doubles)

Champions

Men's singles
- (United Kingdom) Julian Snow

Women's singles
- (United Kingdom) Penny Lumley

Men's doubles
- (United Kingdom) Julian Snow / (United Kingdom) James Male

Women's doubles
- (United Kingdom) Alex Garside / (United Kingdom) Charlotte Cornwallis
← 1997 ·	British Open (real tennis)	· 1999 →

The 1998 Real Tennis British Open was the 19th edition of the British Open since it became an annual event in 1979. The men's event was held at the Queen's Club in London between 14–28 November 1998 and was organised by the Tennis and Rackets Association. The qualifying event was held at the Royal Tennis Court at Hampton Court Palace between 7-8 November 1998. The men's draw was the fourth and final grand slam event of the year. The women's events were organised by the Ladies Real Tennis Association at both Canford School and the Holyport Real Tennis Club.

The men's singles draw was won by Julian Snow. It was his fourth British Open title, and his eighth and last Open title, last won the title in 1994. He beat Steve Virgona in the final in five set, the latter playing in his first Open singles final. Defending champion Chris Bray and World Champion Robert Fahey both lost in the quarter finals. The doubles was won by Julian Snow and James Male, defending their 1997 title. They defeated Virgona and Ruaraidh Gunn in the final, preventing the latter from becoming the first pair to win a calendar year grand slam. The feat would not be accomplished in the men's game until Tim Chisholm and Camden Riviere in 2017.

The women's singles draw was won by Penny Lumley for the fourth consecutive year, and seventh overall. She beat Sue Haswell in the final at Holyport. The doubles was won by Alex Garside and Sally Jones, recovering their title from the 1993 British Open. In the final, they saved two championship points against Fiona Deuchar and Charlotte Cornwallis.

== Draw and results ==
=== Men's Singles Qualifying ===
==== Group A ====
First Qualifying Round
(United Kingdom) N Lloyd	5	6	6
(United Kingdom) M Ryan	6	5	3
(United Kingdom) J Prenn	6	6
(United Kingdom) N Baker	4	5

Final Qualifying Round
(United Kingdom) J Prenn	0	6	6
(United Kingdom) N Lloyd	6	2	3

==== Group B ====
First Qualifying Round
(United Kingdom) I Ronaldson	6	6
(United Kingdom) N O'Hagan	3	2
(United Kingdom) T Granville	6	6
(United Kingdom) M Ward	2	4

Final Qualifying Round
(United Kingdom) I Ronaldson	w/o
(United Kingdom) T Granville

==== Group C ====
First Qualifying Round
(United Kingdom) B Ronaldson	6	6
(United Kingdom) J Acheson-Gray	3	5	3
(United Kingdom) I Snell	6	5	6
(United Kingdom) R Krznaric	4	6	4

Final Qualifying Round
(United Kingdom) B Ronaldson	6	1	0
(United Kingdom) I Snell	3	6	6

==== Group D ====
First Qualifying Round
(United Kingdom) S Brockenshaw	6	4	6
(United Kingdom) C Swallow	5	6	3
(United Kingdom) M Seigneur	4	6	6
(United Kingdom) A Oliver	6	4	4

Final Qualifying Round
(United Kingdom) S Brockenshaw	3	0
(United Kingdom) M Seigneur	6	6

=== Men's Singles ===
First round
(United Kingdom) M Eadle	5	2	6	6	6
(Australia) B Dale	6	6	1	4	5
(United Kingdom) J Willcocks	3	6	6	6
(United Kingdom) I Ronaldson	6	3	0	5
(Australia) J Howell	6	6	6
(United Kingdom) K Sheldon	3	3	1
(United Kingdom) A Phillips	6	6	6
(United Kingdom) M Seigneur	4	1	2
(Australia) K Ludekens	6	6	6
(United Kingdom) M Howard	4	5	4
(United Kingdom) N Pendrigh	4
(United Kingdom) J Dawes	1
(United Kingdom) A Lyons	6	6	6
(United Kingdom) H Latham	3	5	0
(United Kingdom) J Prenn	6	6	6
(United Kingdom) I Snell	2	3	4

Second Round
(Australia) R Fahey	6	6	6
(Australia) M Eadle	2	3	3
(Australia) S Virgona	6	6	6
(United Kingdom) J Willcocks	1	3	2
(United Kingdom) J Male	6	6	6
(Australia) J Howell	1	1	0
(United Kingdom) M Gooding	6	6	0	6
(United Kingdom) A Phillips	3	1	6	2
(United Kingdom) J Snow	6	6	6
(Australia) K Ludekens	0	1	0
(United Kingdom) N Wood	6	6	6
(United Kingdom) N Pendrigh	0	5	4
(United Kingdom) R Gunn	6	6	6
(United Kingdom) A Lyons	2	4	1
(United Kingdom) C Bray	6	6	6
(United Kingdom) J Prenn	0	3	2

Quarterfinals
(Australia) R Fahey	6	6	1	1	2
(Australia) S Virgona	2	3	6	6	6
(United Kingdom) J Male	4	4	3
(United Kingdom) M Gooding	6	6	6
(United Kingdom) J Snow	6	5	5	6	6
(United Kingdom) N Wood	5	6	6	4	1
(United Kingdom) R Gunn	6	1	6	6
(United Kingdom) C Bray	2	6	4	4

Semifinals
(Australia) S Virgona	5	6	6	6
(United Kingdom) M Gooding	6	1	5	3
(United Kingdom) J Snow	6	6	6
(United Kingdom) R Gunn	5	2	1

Finals
(Australia) S Virgona	6	4	0	6	2
(United Kingdom) J Snow	4	6	6	3	6

=== Men's Doubles ===
First round
(United Kingdom) R Gunn (Australia) S Virgona	6	6	6
(United Kingdom) H Latham (United Kingdom) D Johnson	0	1	1
(United Kingdom) J Willcocks (United Kingdom) N Pendrigh	6	3	5	6	6
(United Kingdom) P Brake (United States) N Smith	4	6	6	4	1
(United Kingdom) A Phillips (United Kingdom) N Wood	6	6	6
(United Kingdom) J Dawes (United Kingdom) M Coghlan	1	1	1
(Australia) R Fahey (Australia) B Dale	6	6	6
(United Kingdom) S Brockenshaw (United Kingdom) T Granville	4	3	3
(United Kingdom) C Bray (United Kingdom) M Gooding	6	6	6
(United Kingdom) B Ronaldson (United Kingdom) I Ronaldson	2	0	0
(Australia) J Howell (United Kingdom) K Sheldon	6	6	6
(United Kingdom) M Eadle (United Kingdom) M Seigneur	0	1	3
(United Kingdom) A Lyons (United Kingdom) J Acheson-Gray	6	6	6
(United Kingdom) C Swallow (United Kingdom) M Ryan	1	0	0
(United Kingdom) J Snow (United Kingdom) J Male	6	1	6	6
(Australia) K Ludekens (United Kingdom) A Oliver	0	0	3

Quarter-finals
(Australia) S Virgona (United Kingdom) R Gunn	6	6	6
(United Kingdom) J Willcocks (United Kingdom) N Pendrigh	1	1	1
(United Kingdom) A Phillips (United Kingdom) N Wood	6	6	6
(Australia) R Fahey (Australia) B Dale	3	2	4
(United Kingdom) C Bray (United Kingdom) M Gooding	6	6	6
(Australia) J Howell (United Kingdom) K Sheldon	0	2	5
(United Kingdom) A Lyons (United Kingdom) J Acheson-Gray	0	0	0
(United Kingdom) J Snow (United Kingdom) J Male	6	6	6

Semi-finals
(Australia) S Virgona (United Kingdom) R Gunn	6	6	6
(United Kingdom) A Phillips (United Kingdom) N Wood	3	2	4
(United Kingdom) C Bray (United Kingdom) M Gooding	2	2	3
(United Kingdom) J Snow (United Kingdom) J Male	6	6	6

Final
(Australia) S Virgona (United Kingdom) R Gunn	4	1	5
(United Kingdom) J Snow (United Kingdom) J Male	6	6	6

=== Women's Singles ===
First round
(United Kingdom) C Walker	6	6
(United Kingdom) P Wilson	2	1
(United States) J Lippincott
bye
(United Kingdom) H Skinner	6	4	6
(United Kingdom) M Pignon	3	6	5
(United Kingdom) H Fowler	w/o
(United Kingdom) C Gilmore
(United Kingdom) C Armstrong-Smtih
bye
(United Kingdom) J Watts	5	6	6
(United Kingdom) A Davies	6	3	2
(United Kingdom) S Owens	w/o
(United States) B Sabbag
(United Kingdom) C Southwell	6	6
(United Kingdom) S Falkner	1	1

Round of 16
(United Kingdom) P Lumley	6	6
(United Kingdom) C Walker	0	0
(United Kingdom) A Cockroft	6	6
(United States) J Lippincott	1	5
(United Kingdom) A Garside	6	6
(United Kingdom) H Skinner	0	1
(United Kingdom) S Jones	6	6
(United Kingdom) H Fowler	0	1
(United Kingdom) K Allen	6	6
(United Kingdom) C Armstrong-Smtih	0	0
(United Kingdom) F Deuchar	6	6
(United Kingdom) J Watts	0	1
(United Kingdom) C Cornwallis	6	6
(United Kingdom) S Owens	2	0
(United Kingdom) S Haswell	6	6
(United Kingdom) C Southwell	2	0

Quarterfinals
(United Kingdom) P Lumley	6	6
(United Kingdom) A Cockroft	2	0
(United Kingdom) A Garside	1	2
(United Kingdom) S Jones	6	6
(United Kingdom) K Allen	1	6	6
(United Kingdom) F Deuchar	6	2	5
(United Kingdom) C Cornwallis	3	3
(United Kingdom) S Haswell	6	6

Semifinals
(United Kingdom) P Lumley	6	6
(United Kingdom) S Jones	2	0
(United Kingdom) K Allen	2	0
(United Kingdom) S Haswell	6	6

Finals
(United Kingdom) P Lumley	6	6
(United Kingdom) S Haswell	3	1

=== Women's Doubles ===
First round
(United Kingdom) J Palamountain (United Kingdom) M Wareing	6	6
(United Kingdom) G Philip (United Kingdom) M Undery	3	4
(United Kingdom) S Falkner (United Kingdom) S Edmunds	2	6	6
(United Kingdom) C Harding (United Kingdom) J Watts	6	3	3

Second round
(United Kingdom) A Garside (United Kingdom) S Jones	6	6
(United Kingdom) A Reichardt (United Kingdom) P Lear	0	0
(United Kingdom) S Bicheno (United Kingdom) C Gilmore	6	6
(United Kingdom) J Palamountain (United Kingdom) M Wareing	0	1
(Australia) F Deuchar (United Kingdom) C Cornwallis	6	6
(United Kingdom) S Falkner (United Kingdom) S Edmunds	1	0
(United Kingdom) C Bell (United Kingdom) L Ronaldson	0	0
(United Kingdom) P Lumley (United Kingdom) M Briggs	6	6

Semifinals
(United Kingdom) A Garside (United Kingdom) S Jones	6	6
(United Kingdom) S Bicheno (United Kingdom) C Gilmore	3	4
(United Kingdom) F Deuchar (United Kingdom) C Cornwallis	6	4	6
(United Kingdom) P Lumley (United Kingdom) M Briggs	3	6	5

Finals
(United Kingdom) A Garside (United Kingdom) S Jones	3	6	6
(United Kingdom) F Deuchar (United Kingdom) C Cornwallis	6	4	5

== See also ==
- Grand Slam (real tennis)
