= Irish Real Tennis Association =

Governing body for real tennis in Ireland

The Irish Real Tennis Association (Cumann Leadóige na h-Éireann) encourages the preservation and development of the game and facilities of real tennis in the Republic of Ireland.

== Background ==
Tennis is first recorded in Ireland in 1609 with a court in Thomas Street, Dublin. Today there are no courts in Northern Ireland and two courts in the Republic of Ireland, neither in playable condition. One is a peculiar open-air court on Lambay Island, part of an Edwin Lutyens-designed estate for the Baring family. It is private property, in a fairly inaccessible location, and the lack of a roof is a practical problem given Ireland's climate.

The other court was built by Edward Guinness, 1st Earl of Iveagh in 1885 at his Earlsfort Terrace house (53°20′7.7″N 6°15′29.3″W), located a few minutes' walk from St. Stephen's Green, Dublin. Constructed of a brick exterior with a black marble interior, the court saw Tom Pettitt successfully defend his world championship against challenger Charles Saunders in 1890. Pettitt resigned the title later that year. In 1939, Rupert Edward Cecil Lee Guinness, 2nd Earl of Iveagh presented his famed court to the nation as a gift. Despite his written wishes (not legally part of the bequest) that the court remain in use, it was immediately shut down, and internal playing features dismantled. The court has since been used by University College Dublin, first as a gymnasium and more recently as a laboratory and offices.

== Saving the Dublin court ==
Since the late 1980s Michael Bolton and Ted Neville had monitored the Earlsfort Terrace court, and lobbied for its restoration when eventually vacated by the university. Additionally, Edward Hughes, former president of the United States Court Tennis Association took an interest in the future of the structure. In 1998, after a plan was announced to permanently convert the court into a 320-seat music recital hall, these men joined their efforts and formed the Irish Real Tennis Association (IRTA). After recruiting members and finding support from the Dublin International Sports Council, An Taisce, and the Irish Georgian Society, the IRTA issued legal and public relations challenges to the proposed conversion. The challenges ranged from the local planning level to a High Court appeal. The IRTA lost every battle, but ended up winning the war, at least so far, as the government abandoned its planned project.

As of November 2007, the university has vacated the building, and the Office of Public Works is entering into discussions with the IRTA about restoring the court for an active real tennis venue.

== Future goals ==
The IRTA is hopeful that the government will allow them to restore the Dublin court. This would transition the association from a preservation focus, to an active public sporting club. Its mission would be twofold: management of the tennis court; and functioning as the national governing body for real tennis.

The association has already made some steps in this direction. Beginning in 2003 they have annually held both an Irish National tournament and an Irish Open tournament, at real tennis clubs in England. The IRTA is also working to demonstrate to the government that they have the financial and membership support to undertake the estimated €750,000 historic restoration project. Individual membership is €15 (€30 family) and open to all interested in promoting real tennis in Ireland.

== Tournaments ==
2003, handicapped matches held at the Bristol and Bath Tennis Club, May 31 - June 1:

- Irish national champion, Michael Bolton (IRTA)
- Irish open champion, Brian Rich (Royal Tennis Court)

2004, handicapped matches held at the Bristol and Bath Tennis Club, May 1 - May 2:

- Irish national champion, Alastair Mackeown (Queen's Club)
- Irish open champion, Nick Ponsford (Bristol & Bath)

2005, handicapped matches held at the Royal County of Berkshire Real Tennis Club (Holyport), May 28 - May 29:

- Irish national champion, Roland Budd (IRTA)
- Irish open champion, Tim Church (Queen's)

2006, handicapped matches held at the Royal County of Berkshire Real Tennis Club, May 27 - May 28:

- Irish national champion, Roland Budd (IRTA)
- Irish open champion, Jim Duncan (Holyport)

2007, held at the Bristol and Bath Tennis Club, May 26 - May 27:

- Irish national champion (singles matches, played level), Roland Budd (IRTA)
- Irish open champions (doubles matches, played handicapped), Roland Budd (IRTA) and Karlis Zauers (IRTA)

2008, handicapped matches held at the Cambridge University Real Tennis Club and Newmarket & Suffolk Real Tennis Club, May 31 - June 1

- Irish national champion, Roland Budd (IRTA)
- Irish open champion, Mark Heffernan

2009, handicapped matches held at the Middlesex University Real Tennis Club, May 30 - May 31

- Irish national champion, Stuart Baxter
- Irish open champion, Mark Heffernan
