= Walter Kinsella (tennis) =

American squash and real tennis player

Walter A. Kinsella (September 5, 1885 – January 31, 1971) was a squash and real tennis player from the beginning of the 20th century. He was a world squash champion from 1914 to 1926 In real tennis, Kinsella lost three challenges for the world championship, to Fred Covey in 1922 and 1923, and to the great Pierre Etchebaster in 1930 at Prince's Club.
