= Hobart Real Tennis Club =

Sporting club in Tasmania, Australia

- Formation: 1875; 151 years ago
- Location: 45 Davey Street, Hobart
- Coordinates: 42°53′7.5″S 147°19′40.2″E
- President: Andrew Brough (as of 2018)
- Website: hobarttennis.com.au

The Hobart Real Tennis Club is a real tennis court in Hobart, Tasmania, Australia. Opening in 1875, it is one of the oldest sporting clubs in the Southern Hemisphere, the oldest of only four real tennis clubs operating nationally, and one of 45 worldwide. Originally known simply as the Hobart Tennis Club, the court predates the advent of lawn tennis, remaining an exclusive haven for the elite to engage in what was then called "real tennis" or "royal tennis". Following a club referendum, the sporting facility was renamed the 'Hobart Real Tennis Club' in 2001.

Hobart hosted the international biennial Bathurst Cup in 1985, 1999 and 2015, and has also held the Australian Open tournament for real tennis on several occasions since the mid 1990s. It was the first home court of twelve-time world champion player, Robert Fahey and Judith Clarke, Australia's first female real tennis World Champion.

== History ==
The first court on the site was constructed in 1875 by Samuel Smith Travers, inspired by his experiences at Oxford University while living in England and playing frequently at Hampton Court. The Hobart court was modelled after Hampton Court. The court is believed to have opened in June or July 1875. Records indicate the court was completed in May of that year, but the opening was delayed due to the late arrival of racquets from England.

The first professional player brought to Hobart by Travers was Tom Stone in 1875, an assistant at the Hampton Court Tennis Club in England. Notably, Stone was the same player who initially taught King Edward VII the basics of the game. In 1882, inspired by their experiences in Tasmania, a group of enthusiasts built a court in Melbourne.

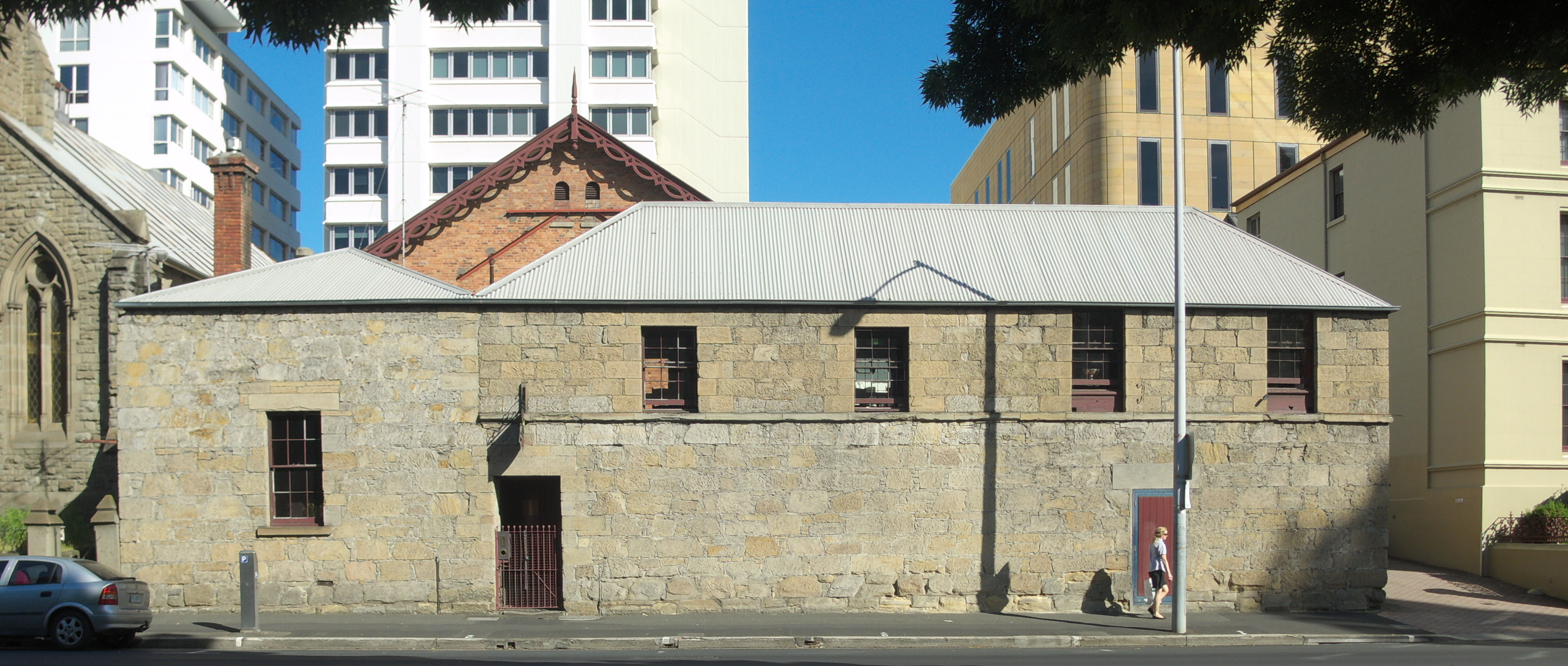
Exterior in 2017

In 1968, the club admitted female members.

=== Modernisation of the club ===
Spearheaded by the successes of world champion player Robert Fahey, who first held the world title between 1994–2016, the club underwent significant restoration and modernisation in 2002. The revitalisation of the premises involved integrating two historic buildings with a new entrance and amenities pavilion and redeveloped roof terrace. The pavilion, designed by H20 architects, showcases a lightweight addition with a transparent skin behind a timber screen inspired by espalier trellis. This design element not only provides sun shading but also supports a grapevine planted in 1974 by world champion Pierre Etchebaster.

== Court layout and game rules ==
Real tennis is a racket sport with medieval origins. The origins of real tennis are unclear, but it likely evolved from the ancient ball games pa paume and palotta, played in Italy and jeu de paume in France. The game seems to have developed in a French monastery 700 to 800 years ago, later adopted by the French aristocracy. The court's design resembles an old abbey courtyard with cloisters on two sides.

The Hobart court conforms to the traditional dimensions of real tennis courts worldwide and is modelled after the Hampton Court in England. The game is played indoors on a court approximately 100 feet (30 m) long by nearly 40 feet (12 m) wide, with walls and floors made of stone.

The court features a unique layout with a net dividing it into two halves—the hazard court and the server's court. The game's scoring system is complex, involving "chases" marked by lines on the floor, and the use of features like the penthouse, dedans, galleries, grille, and tambour, each contributing to the strategic play.
