= International Tennis Club of Washington =

Tennis venue in Vienna, Virginia

Coordinates: +38.9108154°N 77.2547452°W

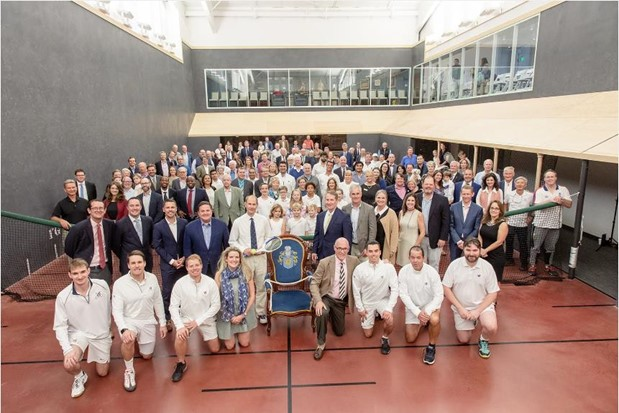
Grand Opening of the new Prince's Court at Westwood Country Club in Vienna, Virginia - November 4, 2022

The International Tennis Club of Washington plays real tennis on Prince's Court at the Westwood Country Club in Vienna, Virginia, 12 miles (19 km) from Washington, D.C. With its Grand Opening on November 4, 2022 with Prince Edward as the guest of honor, Prince's Court, (along with its predecessor in McLean, Virginia that was dedicated on October 11, 1997) was at the time the only new real tennis venue to be constructed in the United States since the Racquet Club of Chicago was built in 1923. (The Chicago court has since been renovated and renewed.) A new court at Sand Valley in Nekoosa, Wisconsin has scheduled its Grand Opening for July 2024.

Prince's Court was originally built in Washington DC due to the efforts of financial supporter and club co-founder Frederick "Freddy" Prince. The ITCW wanted to honor Freddy's efforts, but he repeatedly modestly declined recognition. After much research, the ITCW found that there had been a succession of Prince's Clubs in England, but none were then currently active, so proposed that the proposed new Washington court be a successor to those courts. Freddy reluctantly agreed, and the name of the new court and the predecessor courts were listed on fund-raising letterhead in the late 1980s and 1990s.

Unusual features of the court include a large gong hung in the last gallery.

The head professional at Prince's Court is Ben Taylor-Matthews, following the death of Ivan Ronaldson, whose father was formerly head professional at Hampton Court Palace. The assistant professional is James Greenley.

== See also ==
- Prince's Club
