= 1999 Ladies Real Tennis World Championships =

- Date: 19-25 April, 1999
- Edition: 8th
- Draw: 28S / 14D
- Location: Hampton Court, London, United Kingdom
- Venue: Royal Tennis Court

Champions

Women's singles
- (United Kingdom) Penny Lumley

Women's doubles
- (United Kingdom) Penny Lumley / (United Kingdom) Sue Haswell
← 1997 ·	Real Tennis World Championship	· 2001 →

The 1999 Ladies Real Tennis World Championships was the 8th edition of the biennial Ladies Real Tennis World Championships, held at the Royal Tennis Court in Hampton Court Palace in April 1999. It was the second time that the Ladies World Championship had been held in the United Kingdom, and the first World Championships at Hampton Court since 1983. It commenced the day after the 1999 British Open final, held at Holyport.

The singles event was won by Penny Lumley, her fifth World Championship victory, and her fourth consecutive title. She defeated Sue Haswell in the final for the third consecutive event. It would be the last time the singles final went to the full three sets until the format change in 2025. Lumley and Haswell teamed up to win the doubles title, defeating Alex Garside and Sally Jones in the final, the latter pair having previously twice won the title in 1989 and 1991.

== Singles ==
First Round
(United States) B Sabbag	6	6
(United Kingdom) M Wright	1	1
(United Kingdom) S Metherell	6	6
(United Kingdom) J Watts	2	1
(Australia) K Leeming	6	6
(United Kingdom) C Southwell	2	2
(United Kingdom) S Jones	6	6
(United Kingdom) C Anies	0	0
(United Kingdom) P Wilson	6	6
(United Kingdom) S Falkner	3	0
(United Kingdom) C Walker	6	6
(United Kingdom) S Owens	5	3
(United States) E David	2	6	6
(France) G Smart	6	2	2
(United States) J Lippincott	6	6
(United Kingdom) C Nicholls	1	3
(United Kingdom) A Garside	6	6
(United Kingdom) J Newby	1	0
(United Kingdom) C Gilmore	6	6
(United Kingdom) C Armstrong-Smith	3	0
(United Kingdom) S Reilly	6	6
(United Kingdom) A Balcerkiewicz	2	1

Second Round
(United Kingdom) P Lumley	6	6
(United States) B Sabbag	1	0
(United Kingdom) S Metherell	w/o
(Australia) K Leeming
(United Kingdom) S Jones	6	6
(United Kingdom) P Wilson	0	0
(United Kingdom) C Walker	1	1
(United Kingdom) F Deuchar	6	6
(United Kingdom) K Allen	6	6
(United States) E David	0	0
(United States) J Lippincott	0	0
(United Kingdom) C Cornwallis	6	6
(United Kingdom) A Garside	6	6
(United Kingdom) C Gilmore	0	5
(United Kingdom) S Reilly	0	0
(United Kingdom) S Haswell	6	6

Quarter Finals
(United Kingdom) P Lumley	6	6
(United Kingdom) S Metherell	1	0
(United Kingdom) S Jones	6	6
(United Kingdom) F Deuchar	4	3
(United Kingdom) K Allen	0	0
(United Kingdom) C Cornwallis	6	6
(United Kingdom) A Garside	3	4
(United Kingdom) S Haswell	6	6

Semi Finals
(United Kingdom) P Lumley	6	6
(United Kingdom) S Jones	3	0
(United Kingdom) C Cornwallis	2	0
(United Kingdom) S Haswell	6	6

Final
(United Kingdom) P Lumley	6	4	6
(United Kingdom) S Haswell	4	6	4

== Doubles ==
First round
(United Kingdom) S Bicheno (United Kingdom) C Gilmore	4	6	6
(United Kingdom) M Pignon (United Kingdom) J Watts	6	1	1
(United Kingdom) K Allen (United Kingdom) S Reilly	6	6
(France) G Smart (United Kingdom) P Wilson	1	1
(Australia) K Leeming (United Kingdom) L Ronaldson	6	6
(United Kingdom) C Anies (United States) E David	0	0
(United Kingdom) C Cornwallis (United Kingdom) F Deuchar	6	6
(United Kingdom) J Vaughan (United Kingdom) S Macintosh	0	0
(United Kingdom) S Metherell (United Kingdom) C Southwell	6	6
(United Kingdom) C Nicholls (United Kingdom) M Wright	0	1
(United States) J Lippincott (United States) B Sabbag	6	6
(United Kingdom) S Edmunds (United Kingdom) S Falkner	1	0
(United Kingdom) C Armstrong-Smith (United Kingdom) S Owens	0	0
(United Kingdom) A Garside (United Kingdom) S Jones	6	6

Second round
(United Kingdom) P Lumley (United Kingdom) S Haswell	6	6
(United Kingdom) S Bicheno (United Kingdom) C Gilmore	0	0
(United Kingdom) K Allen (United Kingdom) S Reilly	3	2
(Australia) K Leeming (United Kingdom) L Ronaldson	6	6
(United Kingdom) C Cornwallis (United Kingdom) F Deuchar	6	6
(United Kingdom) S Metherell (United Kingdom) C Southwell	0	0
(United States) J Lippincott (United States) B Sabbag	4	1
(United Kingdom) A Garside (United Kingdom) S Jones	6	6

Semifinals
(United Kingdom) P Lumley (United Kingdom) S Haswell	6	6
(Australia) K Leeming (United Kingdom) L Ronaldson	0	0
(United Kingdom) C Cornwallis (United Kingdom) F Deuchar	6	4	5
(United Kingdom) S Jones (United Kingdom) A Garside	3	6	6

Finals
(United Kingdom) P Lumley (United Kingdom) S Haswell	3	6	6
(United Kingdom) S Jones (United Kingdom) A Garside	6	2	1
