= Newport Pro Amateur Challenge =

Defunct tennis tournament
- Founded: 1883; 142 years ago
- Abolished: 1887; 138 years ago
- Editions: 4
- Location: Newport, Rhode Island, United States
- Venue: Newport Casino
- Surface: Grass / outdoor

The Newport Pro Amateur Challenge was a series of one day men's tennis tournaments that pitted the best professional tennis players against the best amateur tennis players for four editions in 1883, 1885 to 1887. It was played at the Newport Casino, Newport, Rhode Island, United States when it was discontinued.

== History ==
Newport Pro Amateur Challenge was a series of one day men's tennis tournaments that pitted the best professional tennis players against the best amateur tennis players. It was first held on 22 August 1883 American professional Tom Pettitt and real tennis world champion defeats US Amateur champ Dick Sears. In 1885 the second edition of the pro amateur challenge was held that featured 10 players, 9 amateur who competed in a round robin format, to earn the right to play against the professional player in the final play off.

== Editions ==
(P) denotes professional player (A) denotes amateur player.

=== 1883 ===
Winner	Runner-up	Score
(United States) Tom Pettitt (P)	(United States) Richard Sears (A)	6–4, 9–11, 6–4, 6–4.

=== 1885 ===
Winner	Runner-up	Score
(United States) Richard Sears (A)	(United States) Tom Pettitt (P)	6–2, 7–5, 6–2.

Semi Finalists
Player	Player
(United States) Godfrey Brinley (A)	(United States) Percy Knapp (A)

Round Robin
#	Players
1	(United States) Mr Foxhall (A)
2	(United Kingdom) Henry Herbert (A)
3	(United States) James R. Keene (A)
4	(United States) R.B. Metcalfe (A)
5	(United States) Mr Taylor (A)
6	(United States) Fiske Warren (A)
