= 1993 Ladies Real Tennis World Championships =

- Date: 3-9 May, 1993
- Edition: 5th
- Draw: 28S / 14D
- Location: Mērignac, Bordeaux, France
- Venue: Jeu de Paume de Bordeaux

Champions

Women's singles
- (United Kingdom) Sally Jones

Women's doubles
- (United Kingdom) Penny Lumley / (United Kingdom) Charlotte Cornwallis
| ← 1991 · | Real Tennis World Championship | · 1995 → |

The 1993 Ladies Real Tennis World Championships was the 5th edition of the biennial Ladies Real Tennis World Championships, held at the Jeu de Paume de Bordeaux in Mérignac in May 1993. It was the first time that any World Championship had been held in France.

The singles event was won by Sally Jones, her first and only World Championship victory. Jones had been the runner-up in the previous two editions. In the final, she was one set and points for 3–1 down against Charlotte Cornwallis, when Cornwallis faltered, allowing the calm Jones to build a slow lead. Jones ultimately claimed the title 5/6 6/2 6/3.

Defending champion Penny Lumley lost in the semi final to future champion Cornwallis. Cornwallis had earlier saved four match points in her quarter final. Lumley and Cornwallis together won the doubles event, beating Jones and Alex Garside in the final in straight sets.

== Singles ==
=== Qualifying ===
| First Qualifying Round |
| (United Kingdom) C Armstrong-Smith | 6 | 6 |
| (United Kingdom) E Camp | 3 | 2 |

| First Qualifying Round |
| (United Kingdom) S Newsom | 6 | 6 |
| (United Kingdom) J Weiss | 4 | 2 |

| First Qualifying Round |
| (United Kingdom) P Danby | 6 | 6 |
| (United Kingdom) I Tuffnell | 2 | 3 |

| First Qualifying Round |
| (United Kingdom) F Syson | 6 | 6 |
| (United Kingdom) J Vickers | 5 | 4 |

| First Qualifying Round |
| (United Kingdom) S Bicheno | 2 | 6 | 6 |
| (France) F Derouineau | 6 | 4 | 1 |

| First Qualifying Round |
| (United Kingdom) L Barnfield | 6 | 6 |
| (France) J Guardia | 0 | 1 |

=== Main Draw ===
First round
(United Kingdom) M Allen | 6 | 6
(United Kingdom) C Armstrong-Smith | 1 | 0
(United Kingdom) S Newsom
bye
(United Kingdom) P Danby
bye
(United Kingdom) S Macintosh | 6 | 6
(United Kingdom) F Syson | 0 | 1
(United Kingdom) S Herbert | 6 | 6
(United Kingdom) A Perie | 0 | 2
(France) B Bidouze | 6 | 6
(United Kingdom) S Bicheno | 0 | 1
(United Kingdom) V Horn | 6 | 6
(United Kingdom) S Owens | 4 | 3
(United States) J Lippincott | 6 | 6
(United Kingdom) L Barnfield | 3 | 1

Round of 16
(United Kingdom) P Lumley | 6 | 6
(United Kingdom) M Allen | 1 | 1
(Australia) F Deuchar | 6 | 6
(United Kingdom) S Newsom | 0 | 1
(United Kingdom) C Cornwallis | 6 | 6
(United Kingdom) P Danby | 0 | 1
(Australia) J Drewitt | 6 | 6
(United Kingdom) S Macintosh | 3 | 4
(Australia) B Baker | 6 | 6
(United Kingdom) S Herbert | 0 | 4
(United Kingdom) S Jones | 6 | 6
(France) B Bidouze | 2 | 2
(United Kingdom) K Allen | 6 | 6
(United Kingdom) V Horn | 2 | 3
(United Kingdom) A Garside | 6 | 6
(United States) J Lippincott | 0 | 3

Quarterfinals
(United Kingdom) P Lumley | 6 | 6
(Australia) F Deuchar | 1 | 4
(United Kingdom) C Cornwallis | 1 | 6 | 6
(Australia) J Drewitt | 6 | 5 | 5
(Australia) B Baker | 2 | 1
(United Kingdom) S Jones | 6 | 6
(United Kingdom) K Allen | 0 | 3
(United Kingdom) A Garside | 6 | 6

Semifinals
(United Kingdom) P Lumley | 5 | 6 | 0
(United Kingdom) C Cornwallis | 6 | 2 | 6
(United Kingdom) S Jones | 3 | 6 | 6
(United Kingdom) A Garside | 6 | 2 | 3

Finals
(United Kingdom) C Cornwallis | 6 | 2 | 3
(United Kingdom) S Jones | 5 | 6 | 6

== Doubles ==
First round
(United Kingdom) S Jones (United Kingdom) A Garside
bye
(United Kingdom) S Newsom (United Kingdom) V Dawes | 6 | 4 | 6
(United Kingdom) A Perie (United Kingdom) J Weiss | 3 | 6 | 3
(United Kingdom) K Allen (France) B Bidouze | 6 | 6
(United Kingdom) L Barnfield (United Kingdom) I Tuffnell | 3 | 1
(United Kingdom) M Allen (United States) J Lippincott
bye
(United Kingdom) M Happell (Australia) F Deuchar | 6 | 6
(France) F Derouineau (United Kingdom) J Vickers | 0 | 1
(Australia) J Drewitt (Australia) B Baker | 6 | 6
(United Kingdom) E Camp (France) J Guardia | 0 | 1
(United Kingdom) V Horn (United Kingdom) S Herbert | 6 | 6
(United Kingdom) S Owens (United Kingdom) C Armstrong-Smith | 1 | 0
(United Kingdom) P Lumley (United Kingdom) C Cornwallis | 6 | 6
(United Kingdom) P Danby (United Kingdom) F Syson | 0 | 0

Quarter-finals
(United Kingdom) S Jones (United Kingdom) A Garside | 6 | 6
(United Kingdom) S Newsom (United Kingdom) V Dawes | 0 | 1
(United Kingdom) K Allen (France) B Bidouze | 6 | 6
(United Kingdom) M Allen (United States) J Lippincott | 5 | 3
(United Kingdom) M Happell (Australia) F Deuchar | 4 | 2
(Australia) J Drewitt (Australia) B Baker | 6 | 4
(United Kingdom) V Horn (United Kingdom) S Herbert | 4 | 2
(United Kingdom) P Lumley (United Kingdom) C Cornwallis | 6 | 6

Semi-finals
(United Kingdom) S Jones (United Kingdom) A Garside | 6 | 6
(United Kingdom) K Allen (France) B Bidouze | 5 | 2
(Australia) J Drewitt (Australia) B Baker | 5 | 2
(United Kingdom) P Lumley (United Kingdom) C Cornwallis | 6 | 6

Final
(United Kingdom) S Jones (United Kingdom) A Garside | 0 | 4
(United Kingdom) P Lumley (United Kingdom) C Cornwallis | 6 | 6
