= 1993 Real Tennis World Championship =

- Date: 1-3 March 1993
- Edition: 58th
- Location: New York City
- Venue: Racquet and Tennis Club

Champions

Men's singles
- (Australia) Wayne Davies
| ← 1991 · | Real Tennis World Championship | · 1994 → |

The 1993 Real Tennis World Championship (known in the US as the 1993 Court Tennis World Championship) was the 58th edition of the real tennis World Championship. It was held at the Racquet and Tennis Club in New York City for the 17th time. Incumbent champion Wayne Davies defended his title against Lachlan Deuchar seven sets to six.

== Players and venue ==
As the defending champion, Wayne Davies automatically qualified to the final. Davies had played five prior World Championships, losing his first two to Chris Ronaldson in 1983 and 1985, but winning the last three in 1987, 1988 and 1991. His only Open victory since the previous event was at the 1991 Australian Open. As the defending champion, Davies had the right to choose the host venue for the Championship, electing to play at the Racquet and Tennis Club in New York City, as he had done for his last two defenses.

At the time, players who had won a national Open (Australian, British, French or US) were eligible to challenge for the World Championship. Two players were eligible - Lachlan Deuchar had won three of four Opens (US, French and British) in 1991 and one (US) in 1992, while Julian Snow won three Opens in 1992 (Australian, French and British). Snow and Deuchar played an Eliminator match at the Royal Melbourne Tennis Club, with Deuchar the victor. Deuchar had been the challenger in the previous two World Championships (1988 and 1991), both times losing to Davies in New York. Davies and Deuchar regularly played doubles together, and were undefeated at the British Open between 1984 and 1992.

== Match ==
The format for the Challenge was best of thirteen sets played over three days. Four sets were scheduled for the first two days, and up to five sets on the final day.

=== Day 1 ===
The first set on Day 1 was described as scrappy, with Deuchar recovering from a 2/4 deficit to win the set 6/4. The standard of play improved in the second set, with both players serving railroads to the other player's volley. Deuchar had a set point at 5/3 but couldn't beat chase 3. In the 5-all game, Deuchar made a critical error attempting to lob a giraffe serve, allowing Davies to capitalise by hitting consecutive grilles to win the set. Davies began to dominate the play thereafter, with Deuchar making repeated unforced errors. Davies won the final two sets of the day 6/3 6/1 to end the day with a 3–1 lead.

=== Day 2 ===
Deuchar had a strong start to the second day, comfortably winning the first set 6/3. The second set was described as the highest quality of the match, until Deuchar made four unforced errors at 4-all. Davies took advantage of the opportunity and battled his way to win the second set 6/4. In the third set, Deuchar wrestled the momentum, quickly recovering from a 2/4 deficit to win 6/4. Davies focussed in on his floor game for the final set, holding a small advantage throughout the set to win 6/3, taking a 5–3 lead into the final day.

=== Day 3 ===
For the third day in a row, Deuchar came out the more confident player, taking the first set 6/2. Continuing into the second set, Deuchar had opportunities to take a 5/2 lead, but Davies fought back well, causing Deuchar to make a series of errors. Davies went on to win the 5-all game, leaving him one set away from the title. Deuchar changed tactics and started serving giraffes to great effect. Davies had no answers as Deuchar quickly won the next to sets 6/3 6/1, sending the match into a deciding set for the first time since 1910. Deuchar lead the final set 1/0 40–15 with a chase worse than 2. Davies played an excellent floor game to recover the game and dominated the rest of the play from the service end, winning the set 6/1 and the match 7 sets to 6.

== Result ==
| World Championship Challenge |
| 1 | (Australia) Wayne Davies | 4 | 6 | 6 | 6 | 3 | 6 | 4 | 6 | 2 | 6 | 3 | 1 | 6 | 7 |
| 2 | (Australia) Lachlan Deuchar | 6 | 5 | 3 | 1 | 6 | 4 | 6 | 3 | 6 | 5 | 6 | 6 | 1 | 6 |
