= George Lambert (tennis) =

British real tennis player

George Lambert (1842–1915) was a British real tennis player. He was the world champion of the sport (1871–1885), succeeded by Tom Pettitt.

== See also ==
- Real tennis world champions
