= Clergé =

French tennis player

René Clergé
Personal information
- Native name: Clergé
- Years active: ~1740s-1760s

Sport
- Sport: Jeu de paume

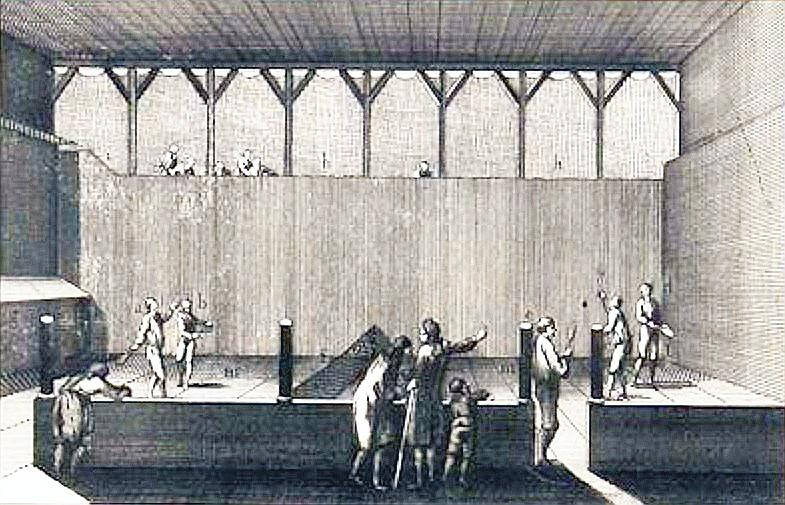
Jeu de paume court in the 18th century.

René Clergé, known simply as Clergé, and also referred to as Clergé de Elder in some sources (Note: Notably by Alain Jacquet in a text published by the Académie des Arts de Touraine.)) was the greatest player of jeu de paume (real tennis) in the mid 18th century, with the height of his career being about 1753 in France. He is credited with being the first world champion of any sport, holding the real tennis title from 1740 until 1765, when Raymond Masson succeeded him. He was particularly good in a four-handed game.

== Biography ==
René Clergé, a French jeu de paume player (or paumiste (Note: A paumiste should not be confused with a paumier, a maker of equipment and renter of courts.)), is said to have become the very first "world champion" in the history of sport in 1740. He remained the first recorded world champion from that year, having won the "silver esteuf".

He retained his title until 1765, when Raymond Masson succeeded him in the list of champions. He was particularly skilled at doubles.

The French Intangible Cultural Heritage inventory describes the player as follows:

The paumier master René Clergé was considered the best player in France; he regularly challenged and defeated the best English players. In a certain sense, this represented the beginnings of spectator sport and modern professional sport.
