= Charles Saunders (tennis) =

English real tennis player

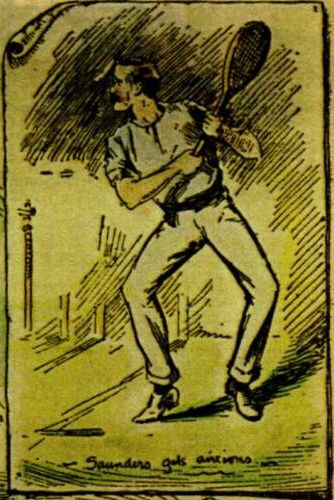
Charles Saunders at the 1890 Championship in Dublin.

Charles Saunders (1861–?) was an English real tennis player.

Saunders was the world champion of the sport from 1890, when Tom Pettitt retired, and remained so until 1895.

== See also ==
- List of real tennis world champions
