= World championship =

International competition

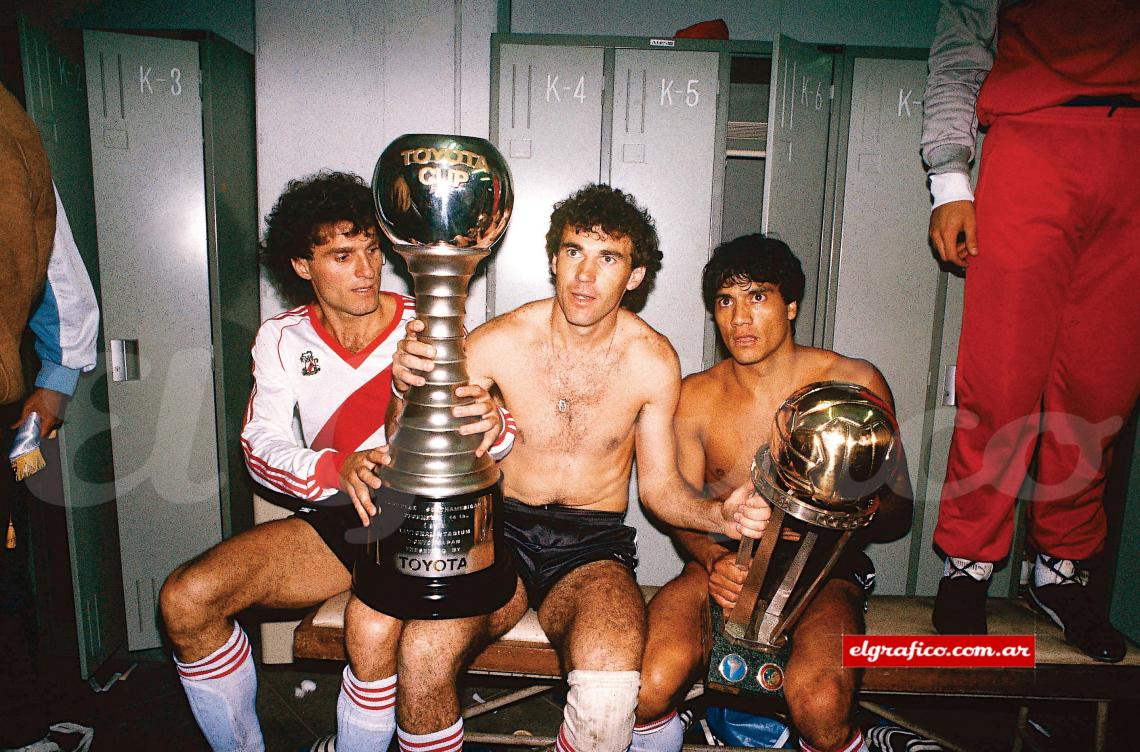
River Plate players Oscar Ruggeri, Nery Pumpido and Héctor Enrique with the Intercontinental Cup trophies after being world champions in 1986

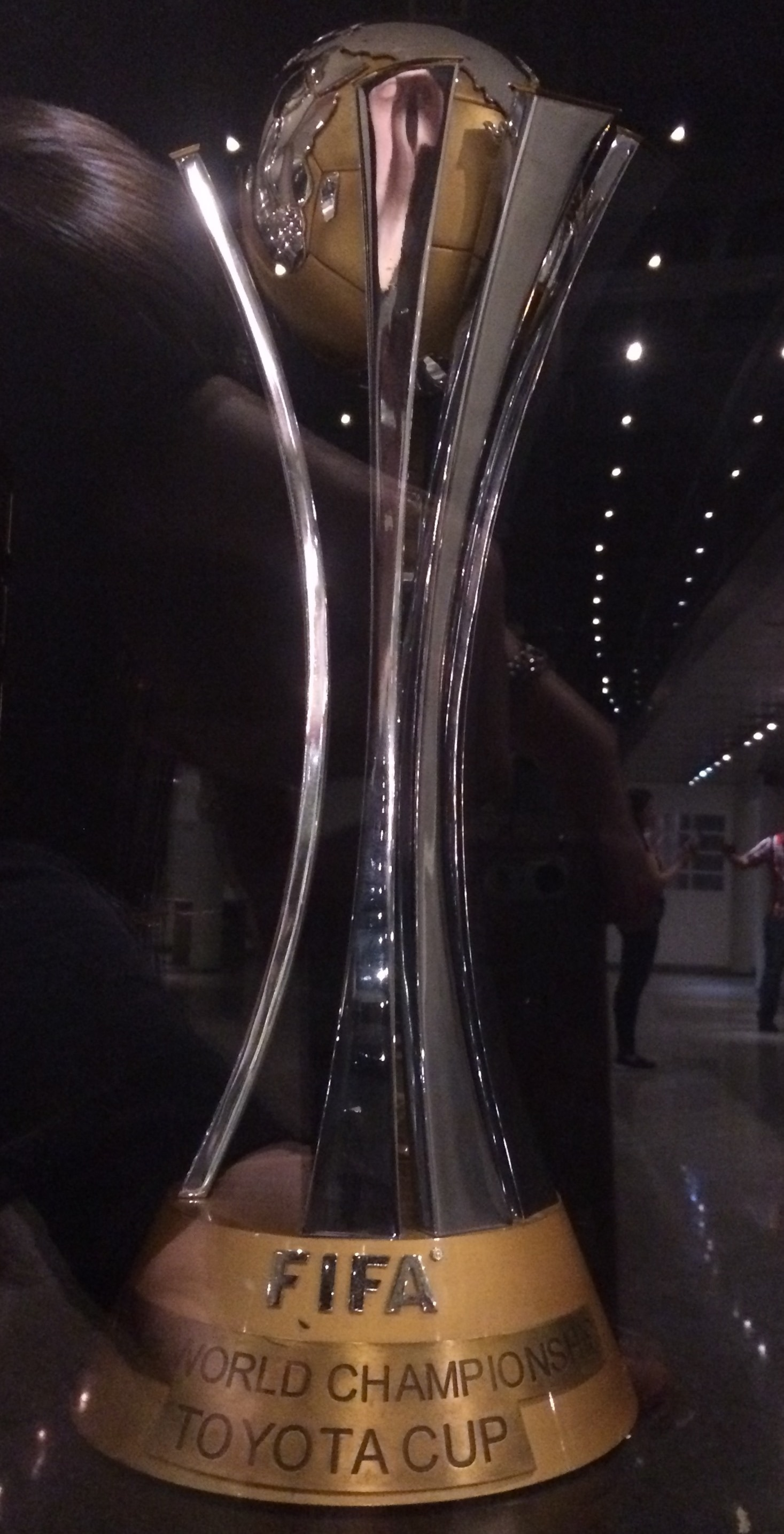
Trophy of the FIFA Club World Cup, the world championship of club association football

A world championship is generally an international competition open to elite competitors from around the world, representing their nations, and winning such an event will be considered the highest or near highest achievement in the sport, game, or ability.

== How the championship title is assigned ==
The title is usually awarded through a combination of specific contests or, less commonly, ranking systems (e.g. the ICC Men's Test Championship), or a combination of the two (e.g. World Triathlon Championships in triathlon). This determines a "world champion", who or which is commonly considered the best nation, team, individual (or other entity) in the world in a particular field, although the vagaries of sport ensure that the competitor recognised at the best in an event is not always the 'world champion'. This may also be known as a world cup competition, for example cycling (UCI World Championships and UCI World Cups). Often, the use of the term cup or championship in this sense is just a choice of words. Some sports have multiple champions because of multiple organizations, such as boxing, mixed martial arts and wrestling.

Certain competitive exercises do not have a world championship or a world cup as such, but may have one or several world champions. Professional boxing, for example, has several world champions at different weights, but each one of them is decided by a "title match", not a tournament. In a title match system, the championship can only be won by directly defeating the incumbent, who in turn must continue to compete to retain their title or risk forfeiture.

In association football (soccer), the first such tournament was the Football World Championship disputed from 1876 to 1904 between the winners of the FA Cup and Scottish Cup. After that, there have been many tournaments between teams from around the world, but it wasn't until 1960 when the Intercontinental Cup was established, competed between the winners of two continental championships: the UEFA Champions League from Europe and CONMEBOL Copa Libertadores from South America, the cup was endorsed by both UEFA and CONMEBOL but had no involvement from FIFA, the governing body for world football. As such, FIFA wanted to expand the tournament to include the champion from other continents—from the AFC Champions League (Asia and Australia), CAF Champions League (Africa), CONCACAF Champions League (North America and Caribbean) and OFC Champions League (Oceania)—and created the FIFA Club World Cup. The first edition in 2000 ran concurrently with the 2000 Intercontinental Cup, and in 2004 the Intercontinental Cup was merged with the CWC, which has been ongoing since 2005 with yearly editions.

Certain competitions do not have a world championship or world cup, but rather hold a series of events recognised as the elite level in their field (e.g. tennis and golf have a series of four Grand Slam events recognised as the pinnacle of the game, in addition to key team events, world tour finals and the Olympic Games, though each year ITF (International Tennis Federation) designates a World Champion based on performances throughout the year).

== History ==
There are some sports that already had a "world championship" in the 18th or 19th century, although it was variable how "world-wide" these competitions really were. The French player Clergé is considered to be the first international champion in real tennis, since 1740. In chess, international matches have been held for centuries, often resulting in certain players considered the best of all, with the first multiplayer tournament held in London in 1851, but Wilhelm Steinitz in 1886 was the first chess player generally recognized as the world chess champion.

Other sports with early "world championships" were English draughts (1840) and speed skating.

== Overview ==
The following lists for the various sports with a world championship include:

- List of world sports championships, for physical sports
- List of world championships in mind sports, including several other activities like competitions in professional activities
- List of world cups and world championships for juniors and youth
- List of world cups
- Lists of Olympic medalists
- Lists of Paralympic medalists

== See also ==
- List of multi-sport champions
- World cup
- World Games
- World University Games
- Youth Olympic Games
