= Fred Covey =

English real tennis player

Geoffrey Frederick Covey (1881-1957) was world champion from 1912 to 1914 and from 1916 until 1928 at real tennis, the original racquet sport from which the modern game of lawn tennis (which has usurped the name "tennis"), is descended.

== Biography ==
He was born in 1881 in Woolwich, England.

Covey was a professional, who, apart from service in the Great War, spent his career at Lady Wentworth's private court at Crabbet Park, in Sussex, where she bred some of the world's most influential Arabian horse bloodstock.

Covey won the world championship in 1912 from Cecil Fairs, lost it in 1914 to Jay Gould, in Philadelphia, regained it in 1916 when Gould could not play the promised return match in England because of the war, defended it successfully in 1922 and 1923 against Walter Kinsella and in 1927, by 7 sets to 5, against the great Pierre Etchebaster at Prince's Club. In 1928 he lost at Prince's, 5 sets to 7, to Etchebaster, who then held the title until 1952.

== Books ==
- FRED COVEY: World Champion of Tennis edited by Neil Covey; 1st standard edition of 1994; 125 pp in large 4to.

== See also ==
- Real tennis world champions
