= Palotta =

Palotta is an Italian surname. Notable people with the surname include:

- Grace Palotta (1870–1959), Austrian-born actress and writer
- Matteo Palotta (1688–1758), Italian priest and composer
