= Tom Pettitt =

English real tennis player

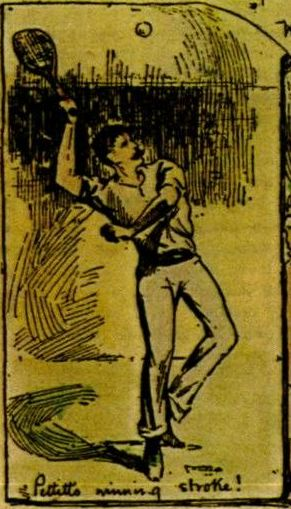
- Tom Pettitt at the 1890 Championship in Dublin
- Born: 19 December 1859; Beckenham, Kent, England
- Died: 17 October 1946 (aged 86); Newport, RI, United States

Thomas "Tom" Pettitt (19 December 1859 - 17 October 1946) was an American real tennis player. He was the court tennis world champion in 1885 and 1890. He was also adept at lawn tennis, and was also a professional coach and player.

== Biography ==
Born in Beckenham, Kent, England, Pettitt emigrated to Boston, Massachusetts, United States, as a penniless teenager. He quickly rose from being the dressing-room boy at a Boston Tennis & Racquet Club, to being the club’s head tennis professional, at age seventeen. He began playing matches in Great Britain and France to improve his game, and finally challenged George Lambert at the Royal Tennis Court, Hampton Court Palace, for the world championship in 1885. He defended his title in Dublin in 1890, then retired the title the same year. He is credited with inventing the railroad, a fast overarm service that runs the length of the penthouse with a reverse twist.

Pettitt continued to work in Boston at various clubs, retiring from the Tennis and Racquet Club in 1927 after half a century of service.

An all-around athlete, Pettitt was also an accomplished cricketer, a sport he brought with him from his native Kent. He frequently represented the Boston Athletic Association (B.A.A.) in local matches. On October 7, 1897, at a benefit match held at the Longwood Cricket Club for the professional Chambers, Pettitt recorded the highest score of the day, a "brilliant" 58 runs, helping the B.A.A. defeat a "Picked Team" of Massachusetts players.

He also taught lawn tennis at the Newport Casino during the summers from 1880–1929, and afterwards continued as a supervisor there. He also took part in the Newport Pro Amateur Challenge a series of one day men's tennis tournaments that pitted best professional tennis players against the best amateur tennis players. In 1883 he played against the amateur two time U.S. National champion Richard Sears who in beat in four sets. In 1885 they met again with Sears gaining the upper hand winning in straight sets.

Pettitt died in Newport, Rhode Island. He was inducted into the International Tennis Hall of Fame in 1982.

== See also ==
- List of real tennis world champions
