= Royal Tennis Court, Hampton Court =

Real tennis court in London, England

Royal Tennis Court, Hampton Court Palace
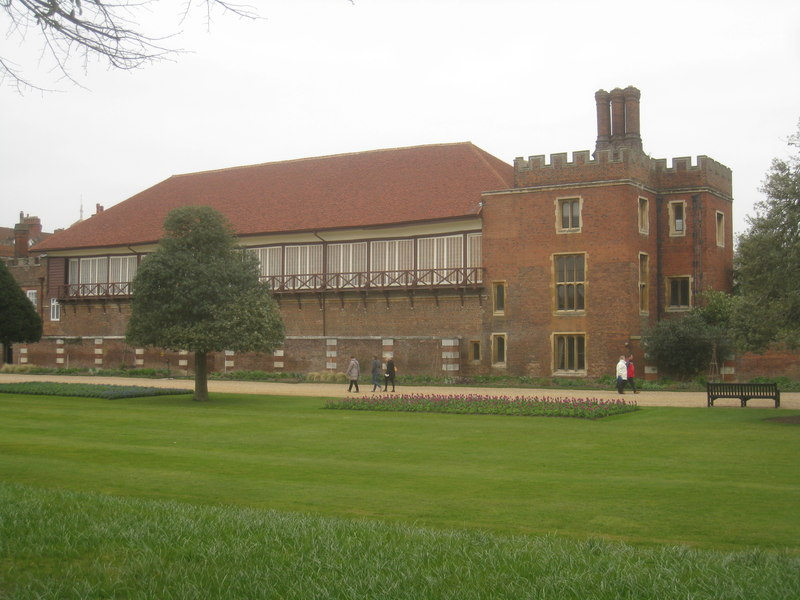
- Royal Tennis Court, Hampton Court Palace
- Interactive map of Royal Tennis Court, Hampton Court Palace
- Location: Hampton Court Palace
- Coordinates: 51.4044°N 0.3362°W

Construction
- Opened: 1528
- Renovated: 1660, 1975

Listed Building – Grade I
- Designated: 2 September 1952
- Reference no.: 1080809

The Royal Tennis Court, Hampton Court Palace is a Grade I listed court for playing the sport of real tennis. It was built for Cardinal Wolsey between 1526 and 1529. Henry VIII of England played there from 1528. This court is still home to an active tennis club. In 2015 it was closed to visitors for major restoration works.

During the 17th century various improvements were made to the court. One of the first acts of Charles II after his restoration in 1660 was to order the extensive refitting of the Tudor tennis court. This included the laying of a new tile floor, the remodelling of the galleries and repairs to the roof. At the same time, new nets, curtains and velvet cushions for the spectators' seats were provided. The interlaced initials above the net on the wall opposite the corridors are, however, not those of Charles but of William III and Mary II (1689–1702). Since the end of the 17th century the court has undergone little alteration. However, progress is not incompatible with history: in 1975 sodium halide lighting was installed.

== Real Tennis World Championship matches ==
The Real Tennis World Championship has been played at the Royal Tennis Court on five occasions:

- 1885 Thomas Pettitt beat George Lambert 7–5
- 1977 Howard Angus beat Gene Scott 7–2
- 1979 Howard Angus beat Chris Ronaldson 7–0
- 1983 Chris Ronaldson beat Wayne Davies 7–4
- 2002 Rob Fahey beat Tim Chisholm 7–6

The Ladies' World Championship, inaugurated in 1985, was played at the Royal Tennis Court in 1999, when defending champion Penny Lumley beat Sue Haswell 2–1 in the final.

== The court today ==
The court is home to a real tennis club of over 450 members. The club is active in interclub competitions and fields sides in the National League (administered by the International Real Tennis Professionals Association) and also in Tennis and Rackets Association tournaments including the Field Trophy. The court hosts the annual Champions Trophy, part of the qualifying series for the Real Tennis World Championship.

The club regularly records the highest court usage of any court in the world, along with the courts at Radley College, Oxfordshire and the Royal Melbourne Tennis Club.

== Masters of the Royal Tennis Courts ==
- c. 1540: Oliver Kelly
- 1543: Thomas Johns
- 1584: William Hope
- 1591: Edward Stone
- 1604: Jehu Webb
- c. 1621: John Webb (jointly with Gedeon Lozier until 1631)
- 1656: Ralph Bird
- 1660: Thomas Cooke
- 1689: Henry Villiers
- 1697: Horatio Moore
- 1708: Thomas Chaplin
- 1728: Charles Fitzroy
- 1762: Richard Beresford
- 1764: William Chetwynd
- 1765: Richard Beresford (again)
- 1791: Charles Meynell (son of Hugo Meynell)
- 1815: William Beresford (until his death in 1883)

== See also ==
- Real tennis organizations
