= Prince's Club =

Gentlemen's multisports club in London, England

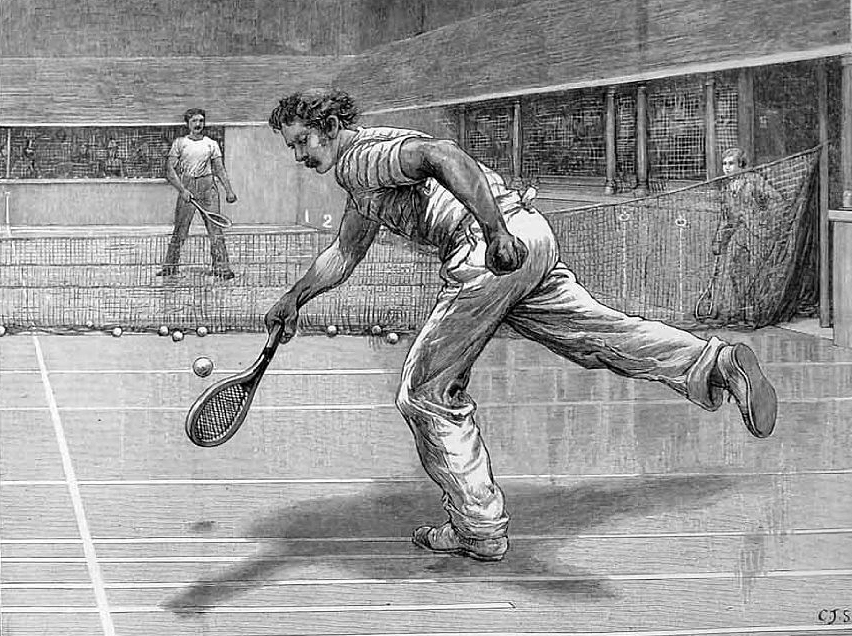
- Opening of the New Prince's Club, Knightsbridge, by the Prince of Wales, showing the tennis match between Mr Alfred Lyttelton and C Saunders
- Formation: 1853
- Dissolved: 1940; 86 years ago
- Type: Private members' club
- Legal status: Defunct
- Purpose: Sport, social
- Location: 197 Knightsbridge, Knightsbridge, London
- Coordinates: 51°30′05″N 0°09′48″W (As of 1888)

The Prince's Club was a socially exclusive gentlemen's multisports club in London, England. The original 'Prince's Club' was founded in 1853 in Chelsea by George and James Prince and its main sports were rackets and real tennis. Cricket, croquet and lawn tennis were also played. After most of its ground was lost to building developments it closed in 1887. Its successor, the 'New Prince's Club', located in Knightsbridge, opened in 1888 and kept its focus on rackets and real tennis, but no longer had any outdoor sports. In 1896 the Prince's Skating Club was opened. The Prince's Club was in operation until the 1940s.

== Original Prince's Club ==
The original "Prince's Club" was founded in 1853 by George and James Prince, (Note: The partnership between the brothers as proprietors of the club was dissolved in August 1864.) owners of a wine and cigar shop in Regent Street, and it opened in 1854. Located on Henry Holland's Pavilion estate, between the current Lennox Gardens, Cadogan Square and Hans Place, an area covering about 13 acres, it was originally a members-only gentlemen's rackets and real tennis club. Gentlemen wishing to join the club had to be proposed and seconded by two of its members. The members were allowed to introduce two friends, who were charged double the rate if they played. Another club rule stated that "no hazard, dice, or game of chance be allowed in this Club". In 1864 the club was incorporated as Prince's Racquets & Tennis Club Company Ltd.

The club's main rackets court, which became known as the Prince's Match Court, set the standard dimensions (60 x 30 ft) and was the location of the most important matches of the time. Another six rackets courts were later added around the main court with varying sizes, some built wider for doubles matches. The University racket matches between Oxford and Cambridge were held at the club from 1858 onwards and an annual competition for the Public Schools Championship was added in 1868 with Eton, Harrow, Cheltenham and Charterhouse competing in the first edition. (Note: During the 19 years (1868–1887) that the Public Schools Championship was held at the Prince's Club the title was won 12 times by Harrow, six times by Eton and once by Rugby. In nine editions the final was played between Eton and Harrow.)

In April 1860, the club opened "very handsome and commodious" Victorian Turkish baths "realising the Roman process of a gymnasium, or philisterium, in conjunction with the bath". Prince's Club was the first club to install such a bath, just weeks after London's first. (Note: The first Victorian Turkish bath to open to the public in England was in Manchester in 1857. The first in London didn't open till the beginning of April 1860, and the Prince's Club already had one by 28 April.)

In 1871 the Prince's Cricket Ground (Note: The first cricket match played on the ground was Household Brigade v. Lords and Commons on 3 June 1871.) was added, laid out on the site of Cattleugh's nursery gardens, as well as a croquet lawn, followed by lawn tennis and lastly a roller-skating rink which was used in the winter for ice skating. The cricket ground was used by the Middlesex County Cricket Club for their first-class cricket matches between 1872 and 1876 before moving to Lord's. The cricket ground was also used by South of England and Gentlemen of the South. Several Gentlemen v Players fixtures were played there, the first taking place in 1873. In 1878 the touring Australian team played two matches on the ground. The club's heyday was in the early 1870s; it had over 1,000 members in 1873.

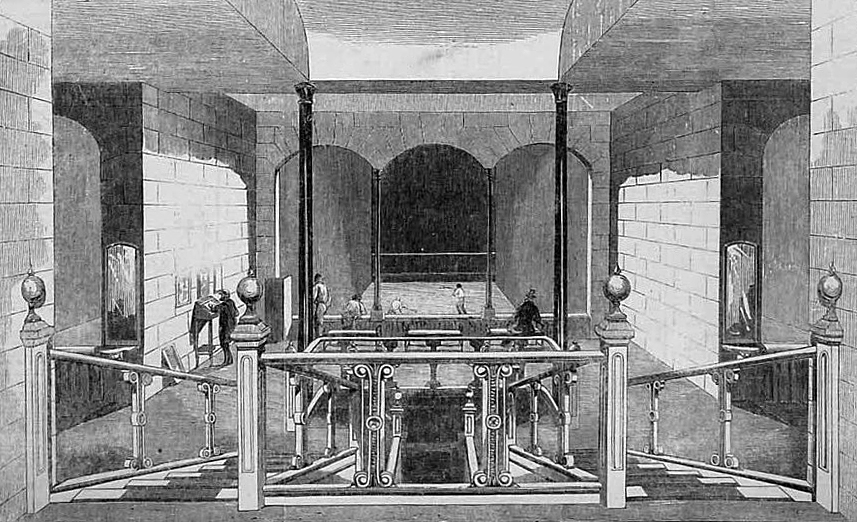
The Old Prince's Club in 1857 with view of a rackets court

The Prince's Club was one of the earliest lawn tennis locations after the sport was introduced in the mid-1870s. The club had two lawn tennis courts and organised open and handicap events. When the Marylebone Cricket Club (MCC), in its capacity as the governing body for rackets and real tennis, issued the first unified rules for lawn tennis on 29 May 1875 they were not universally adhered to and the Prince's Club, among others, stuck to playing on rectangular courts instead of the prescribed hourglass-shaped courts. It held an open tournament in 1881 which leading players Ernest Renshaw, William Renshaw and Herbert Lawford competed. William Renshaw won the tournament while his brother Ernest won the handicap event. The following year, 1882, Ernest Renshaw won the open tournament. From 1881 through 1883 the club was the location of the varsity lawn tennis matches. On 31 July 1883 a match was played at Prince's between the Liberal government and the Conservative opposition, including Lord George Hamilton, Arthur Balfour and Herbert Gladstone, which ended in two-all.

Since the second half of the 1870s areas of the club's ground were gradually repurposed for building activities, enabled by the Cadogan and Hans Place Improvements Act 1874. A road was built on the southern part of the ground in the winter of 1876–1877. Part of the northern ground at Hans Road was lost in 1877 and the two lawn tennis courts had to be relocated. In the winter of 1877–1878 additional parts of the ground were used for building projects. In the summer of 1886 only the main rackets court and one of the tennis courts were left, and when its lease expired and its last buildings were demolished in the fall of 1886 the club closed in 1887.

== New Prince's Club ==
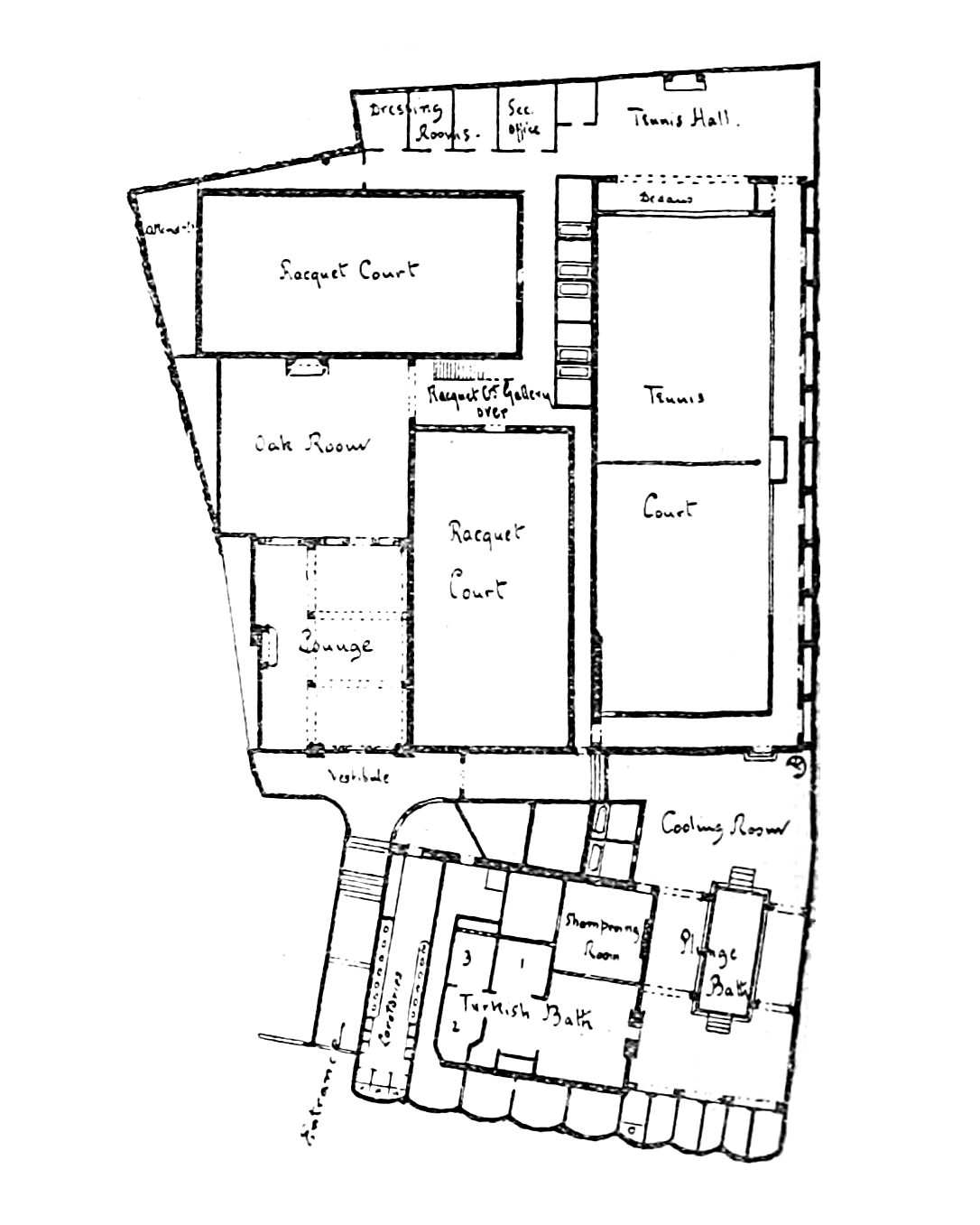
Floor plan of the 1889 club, designed by Edward Herbert Bourchier

The "New Prince's Club", officially named the "Prince's Racquet and Tennis Club", was a socially exclusive club and sports centre for the upper ten. It opened in 1888 in Knightsbridge in the former Humphreys' Hall mansions which had been extensively reconstructed after a fire in May 1885. (Note: The "New Prince's Club" was located at 197 Knightsbridge. Prior to the reconstruction of Humphreys' Hall the location had been home to the Japanese Village exhibition.) The Prince's Club title had been obtained from the Prince brothers. The official opening took place on 18 May 1889 and was performed by Albert Edward, the Prince of Wales who was received by Sir William Hart Dyke, the president of the club. To mark the occasion an exhibition real tennis match was played between Alfred Lyttelton and Charles Saunders. The club had two rackets and two real tennis courts but no longer provided any outdoor sports facilities. (Note: This absence of a true multipurpose sports club in London led to the creation of the Queen's Club in 1885.)

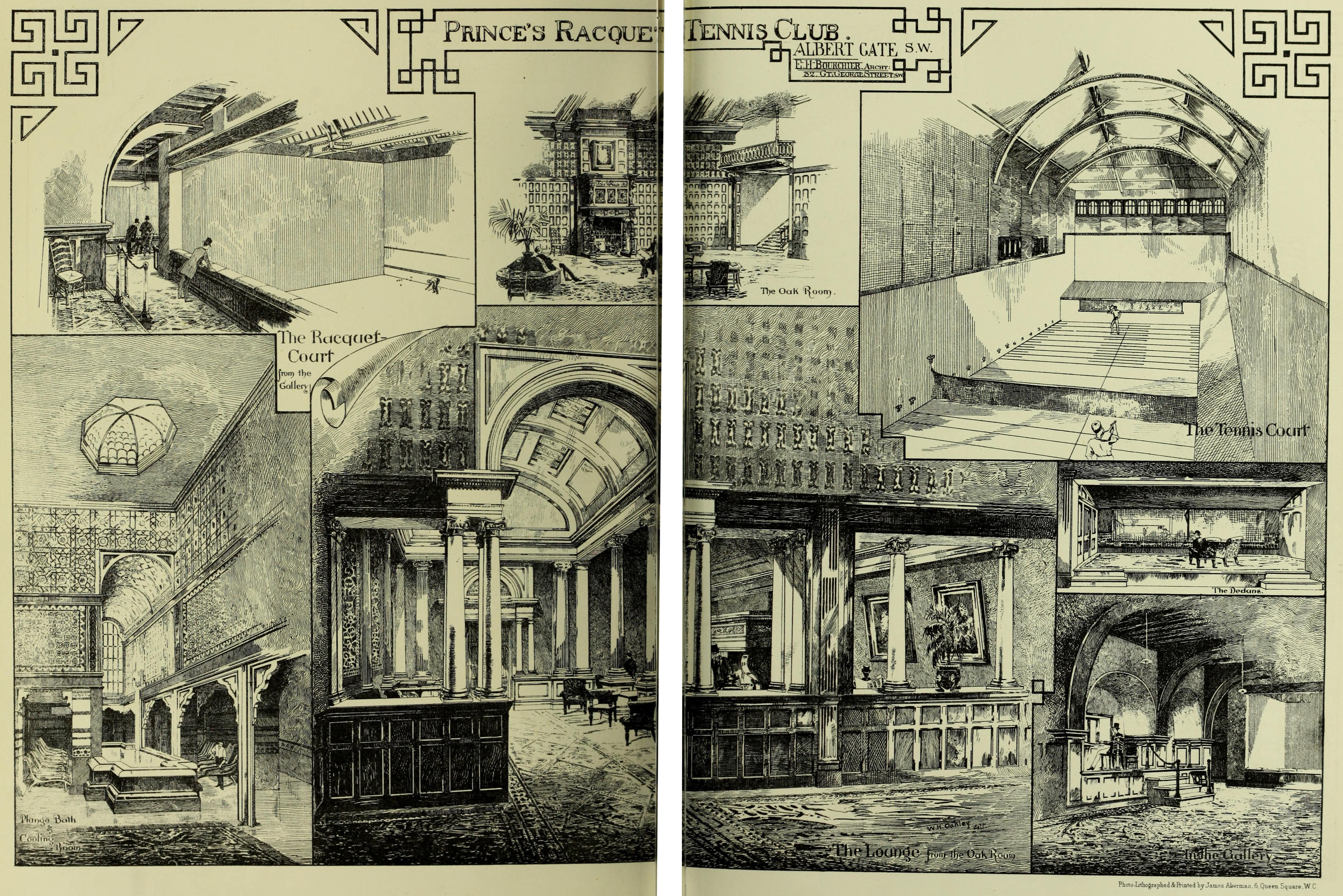
Illustration of the club's rooms

The new club also had two bowling alleys and several baths, including an "elegantly constructed" Turkish bath decorated by the Sicilian artist Emilio Marolda assisted by a number of Italian artists. There was also a Russian vapour bath, a sitz bath, a needle shower, and hot and cold water baths. The plunge pool was lined with blue mosaic finished with a brass capping and, for use by the Prince of Wales, there was a private bath constructed "entirely of marble". The fittings were supplied by John Smeaton, Son, & Co who specialised in furnishing the better class Turkish baths of the day. The University racket matches as well as the Public Schools Championships moved to the newly created Queen's Club which took over the role of premier rackets facility from the Prince's Club. Prince's did introduce a rackets competition between officers of the Royal Navy and the Royal Marines which was played from 1919 onward. Many real tennis championship challenges were played at Prince's, Pierre Etchebaster won the world championship here from Fred Covey in 1928, having failed to do so in 1927. Notable real tennis professionals at Prince's include Henry Johns from c. 1926 to 1935.

=== Prince's Skating Club ===
In November 1896 at nearby Montpelier Square the Prince's Skating Club was founded, which hosted Prince's Ice Hockey Club. In March 1900, the rink hosted the first Ice Hockey Varsity Match, won 7–6 by Oxford. The skating club was sold in 1903 to the Duchess of Bedford. The ice rink was the location of the figure skating events of the 1908 Summer Olympics held in October that year. From the beginning of the 20th century the club hosted of a number of exhibitions and bazaars. On 13–25 May 1909 it was the venue of the 'Women's Exhibition', a fundraising event organised by the Women's Social and Political Union (WSPU) in support of the suffragette movement. The ice rink closed in 1917.

=== Prince's Club during Second World War ===
The Prince's Club ceased its activities during World War II when the clubhouse was requisitioned by the War Office.

In mid-1940 after the Fall of France the Prince's Club became No 1 Army Postal Distribution Centre (No 1 APDC) run by the Royal Engineers (Postal Section). It was one of six Army Postal Distribution Centres established in Bristol, Shrewsbury, Leeds, Edinburgh and Belfast to provide a secure means of circulating mail for the 'Home Forces' organisation.

The Home Postal Depot, Royal Engineers moved from Sutton Coldfield to take over the premises in 1948 and remained its occupiers until the building was torn down ca. 1952 to make way for the Mercury House flats.

== Sources ==
- Social history: Social and cultural activities, A History of the County of Middlesex, Volume 12: Chelsea (2004), pp. 166–176.

== See also ==
- List of London's gentlemen's clubs
