= Sally Jones (journalist) =

English journalist, television news and sports presenter

- Born: 1955 (age 70–71); Coventry, Warwickshire, England
- Education: King Edward VI High School for Girls; St Hugh's College, Oxford
- Occupations: Sportswoman, journalist, television news and sports presenter
- Employer(s): Central News; BBC Breakfast News; Westward Television

Sally Jones (born 1955) is a British journalist and television presenter for sports and news. In 1986, she became the BBC's first woman sports presenter on BBC Breakfast News.

She is also a three-time world champion in real tennis, winning the singles title once and the doubles title twice.

== Education ==
Jones was born in 1955 in Coventry, Warwickshire, the daughter of a bank manager in Coleshill. She was educated at Coleshill Parochial School, Coleshill Grammar School, King Edward VI High School for Girls, Birmingham, and at St Hugh's College, Oxford, where she read English and won five blues and half blues for different sports including tennis, squash, netball, cricket and modern pentathlon.

She won the Sale of the Century quiz when she was 18 years old and has since appeared on celebrity editions of Fifteen to One and The Krypton Factor. She has appeared five times on Mastermind and reached the semi-finals in 2008.

== Sport ==
Jones was Warwickshire county and British schoolgirls tennis champion (Lawn Tennis Association) and a finalist in the British Under 21 doubles championship (LTA). She played county tennis, squash (Warwickshire, Devon and South Wales squash associations), and netball (Birmingham Schools and Midlands First teams), captaining the Warwickshire senior tennis team for ten years and leading them to the Group 1 County Championship at Eastbourne in July 1997. She won the Sunday Telegraph Travel Writing Prize for an account of a British Universities tennis tour of Ireland and two Catherine Pakenham awards for women journalists.

== Broadcasting and writing career ==
During her career, Jones has been a BBC news trainee, a TV reporter at Westward Television, and a TV reporter for HTV (Wales) where she also made several documentaries, and Central TV in Birmingham where she co-presented Central News and reported on the politics show Central Lobby. She has also reported for ITN and Channel 4 News and has written columns for the Daily Telegraph, Daily Mirror and Today. In 1986, she became the BBC's first woman sports presenter on BBC Breakfast News: she claimed in 2012 that during that job she was sexually assaulted by Jimmy Savile in a lift at the BBC.

She presented for BBC Sport during the 1988 Seoul summer Olympics and for BBC World during the 1992 Barcelona summer Olympics.

Jones has also presented several series of On the Line; the daytime show The Garden Party; real tennis documentaries on Channel 4; coverage of women's British Open golf, international tennis, women's rugby, and NBA basketball on the BBC; Transworld Sport on Channel 4; and international gymnastics on ITV. She regularly presented Woman's Hour from Birmingham (BBC Radio 4) and was a member of the BBC Radio 5 Live Wimbledon tennis commentary team during the 1990s. In 2010, she set up Sally Jones Features Ltd, a media consultancy which does a range of media and publicity work for clients including Birmingham Children's Hospital, Twycross Zoo, Malvern College, King Edward VI High School for Girls, the Real Tennis and Rackets Association, Warwickshire Police and Warwickshire Police and Crime Commissioner and for a range of Midlands charities and community groups.

She now appears regularly as a pundit on numerous outlets including This Morning (ITV), BBC Radio, Talk TV, Times Radio, GB News etc. She works pro bono as publicist for the 'Movers and Shakers' podcast on living with Parkinson's. This features several of her former colleagues including Jeremy Paxman, Gillian Lacey-Solymar, Rory Cellan-Jones, Sir Nick Mostyn, Mark Mardell and Paul Mayhew-Archer.

She has also written several books on Westcountry folklore, including Legends of Cornwall (1980), Legends of Devon (1981), Legends of Somerset (1983), and the Ladybird Book of Riding. In 2006, she co-wrote and edited a local history book on Georgian Warwickshire.

== Real tennis ==
In 1986, Jones took up real tennis and won the 1993 World Championship at Bordeaux, as well as two British Open and two US Open championships. She won the World Doubles Championship with Alex Garside in 1989 and 1991 and was British Open doubles finalist with Jo Iddles in 2008.

== Personal life ==
In 1989, Jones married John Wallace Grant, who was 14 years her senior. He was a civil engineer who had worked on Spaghetti Junction, Birmingham and the Wolverhampton Ringroad in the 1970s. He was diagnosed with Alzheimer's disease in 2021, and died from it in August 2026. They lived at Newbold Pacey, Warwickshire. They had two children.

== Selected works ==
- Legends of Cornwall (1980)
- Legends of Devon (1981)
- Legends of Somerset (1983)
- Mysteries in the Somerset Landscape (1986)
- The Ladybird Book of Riding and Pony Care (1987)
- Georgian Coleshill (2006)
