= Racquet and Tennis Club =

Social and athletic club in New York City

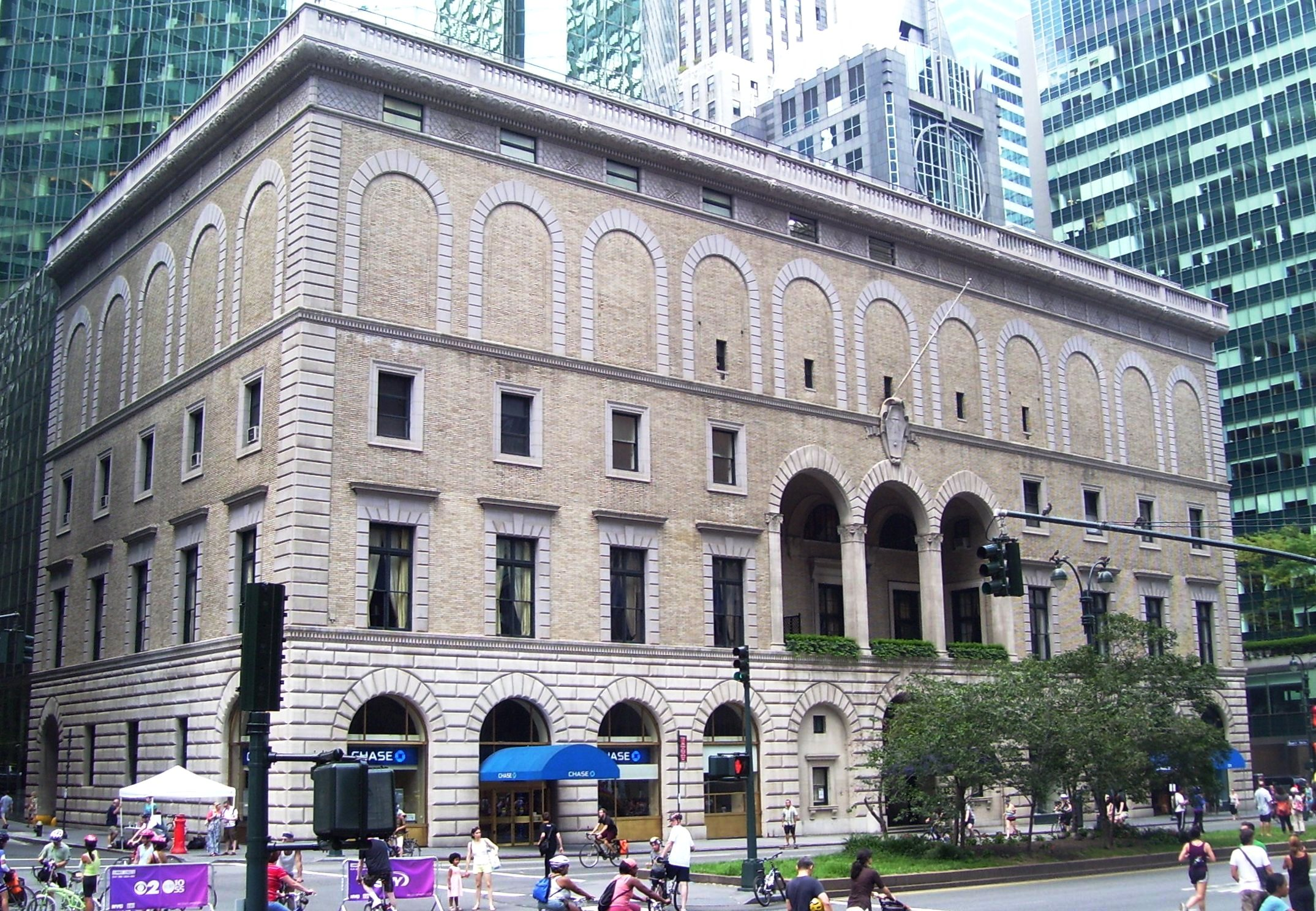
- The Racquet and Tennis Club in 2012
- Racquet and Tennis Club

General information
- Architectural style: Italian Renaissance
- Location: 370 Park Avenue, Manhattan, New York City, United States
- Coordinates: 40°45′31″N 73°58′25″W
- Completed: 1916

Design and construction
- Architect: William S. Richardson
- Architecture firm: McKim, Mead and White
- Designations

U.S. National Register of Historic Places
- Designated: July 13, 1983
- Reference no.: 83001741

New York State Register of Historic Places
- Designated: May 3, 1983
- Reference no.: 06101.000444

New York City Landmark
- Designated: May 8, 1979
- Reference no.: 1000

Website
- rtcny.org

The Racquet and Tennis Club, familiarly known as the R&T, is a private social and athletic club at 370 Park Avenue, between East 52nd and 53rd Streets in Midtown Manhattan, New York City.

== History ==
The Racquet Court Club was organized April 28, 1875 and opened May 27, 1876 at 55 West 26th Street. It had two racquets courts, an indoor running track and two bowling alleys. In 1890, it merged into the newly incorporated Racquet and Tennis Club, which planned to build a tennis court, moving the following year to a second, larger clubhouse at 27 West 43rd Street (1891). This second clubhouse had two racquets courts, one fives court and one court tennis court. The Club moved to its third, and current, home in 1918.

== Clubhouse ==
The R&T's current clubhouse was designed by William Symmes Richardson, a partner at McKim, Mead, and White. The facility was built on a parcel offered for lease by a member of the club, Robert Goelet. Richardson, who had primary design responsibility for Pennsylvania Station and the Hotel Pennsylvania, proposed an integrated Italian Renaissance style and his firm's proposal was presented to the membership for approval in April 1916. In addition to offering its members more spacious amenities, the move to Park Avenue afforded more consistent natural light for the skylit playing courts, as well a generally more desirable location. Construction began on December 20, 1916 and was completed on April 15, 1918. The builder was Mark Edlitz, and the estimated cost was $500,000. Board of Directors at this time included financier Ogden Mills and sportsman Harry Payne Whitney.

The resulting building is about 200 feet by 100 feet (30 m x 60 m) and five stories tall. The exterior is stone and brick over a structural steel frame. According to the original plans, the interior contained three dining rooms, a billiard room, library, lounge, gymnasium, swimming pool, five squash courts, two court tennis courts, and two racquets courts. Today, there are four singles squash courts, one hardball squash doubles court, one racquets court and two court tennis courts. The Club's court facilities are considered among the finest in the world.

The structure is representative of the ornate private clubs constructed in New York City during the early 20th century. McKim, Mead and White had previously designed the Harvard Club of New York City, the Century Association and the University Club of New York. It performs an important architectural role on Park Avenue as a foil to the Seagram Building, directly across the avenue, and the Lever House, across 53rd Street, and other corporate structures in the glass-clad vocabulary of International Modernism.

The building was designated a New York City Landmark in 1979 and on July 21, 1983, the building was listed in the National Register of Historic Places.

The club sold its air rights on Park Avenue to the developer of the Park Avenue Plaza skyscraper in 1978. The glass-clad skyscraper rises in the middle of the block, immediately behind the club.

== Notable ==
- Pierre Etchebaster

== Court tennis, racquets and squash ==
The Club's first racquets tournament was played in 1876, the first court tennis tournament in 1892 and the first squash tournament in 1902.

== Membership ==
The R&T has maintained its men-only membership policy. Women are welcome at the Club for social and athletic events.

== See also ==
- List of American gentlemen's clubs
- List of New York City Designated Landmarks in Manhattan from 14th to 59th Streets
- National Register of Historic Places listings in Manhattan from 14th to 59th Streets
