= Pierre Etchebaster =

French real tennis player (1893–1980)

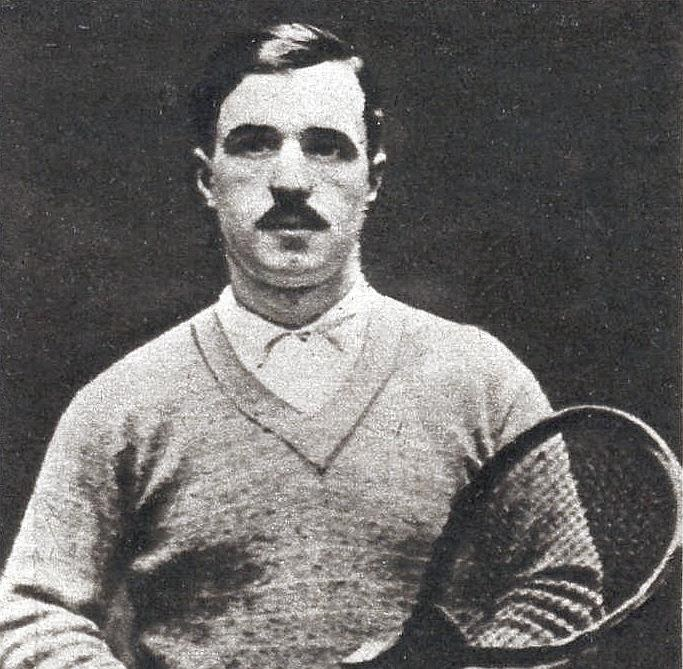
Pierre Etchebaster in 1928

Pierre Etchebaster (8 December 1893 – 24 March 1980) was a French real tennis player, (in French jeu de paume), the original racquet sport from which the modern game of lawn tennis is descended.

== Life ==
Born in Saint-Jean-de-Luz, France, a Basque fishing village, he served in the French Army during World War I before returning home to become the French champion in main nués, pala and chistera, all varieties of Basque pelota.

In 1922, Etchebaster was encouraged by tennis player Jacques Worth (a president of a Paris court club) to take up the game of real tennis. His first time on the court was during his audition to be the head professional of the club. After a few minutes of play, he was selected to fill the role. George Plimpton wrote that this was equivalent to "picking up a baseball bat in the morning and playing for the New York Yankees in the afternoon."

Despite losing his first challenge to Fred Covey in 1927, Etchebaster returned in his customary blue beret to win the world championship in London in 1928. He emigrated to New York City in 1930 to be a professional at the Racquet and Tennis Club. Etchebaster proceeded to dominate the sport. He was the world champion for a record-breaking 26 years (1928–1954) until his retirement at the age of 60. He defended the title seven times — a feat unmatched until 2006 when Robert Fahey made his seventh title defense (Fahey successfully defended his title eleven times).

He would spend hours a day on court practising his shots, and studying the spin effects the various surfaces of the court had on the ball. In 1955 he was awarded the Légion d'honneur for his achievements, and in 1978 he was inducted into the International Tennis Hall of Fame.

After his retirement in 1971, a book of his coaching advice, Pierre's Book, was published. It including accolades from many of the world's best players. He died in Saint-Jean-de-Luz.

For many years Etchebaster divided his time between his summer position as a lawn tennis professional at Piping Rock Club, Locust Valley, NY and his role as head professional at the Racquet and Tennis Club on Park Avenue in New York. Each spring he would spend a month in Aiken, South Carolina, the site of one of the nine real tennis courts in the United States, where he would give lessons and play exhibitions.

The Racquet and Tennis Club made a video in 1954 featuring Etchebaster, Ogden Phipps, Francis X. Shields, and Alastair B. Martin, playing singles and doubles.

Pierre's Book (Barre Publishers, Barre MA 1971) was edited and introduced by George Plimpton.

== See also ==
- List of real tennis world champions

== Sources ==
- Grasso, John (2011). Historical Dictionary of Tennis. Scarecrow Pres. p. 96. ISBN 978-0810872370.
