= 2023 Real Tennis World Championship =

Tournament information
- Dates: September, 2023
- Venue: International Tennis Club of Washington
- City: McLean, Virginia
- Country: United States
- Organisation: IRTPA
- Defending champion: (United States) Camden Riviere

Final
- Champion: (United States) Camden Riviere
- Runner-up: (United Kingdom) John Lumley
- Score: 6/4 6/2 6/3 6/4 4/6 6/3 5/6 5/6 6/5 6/3

The 2023 Real Tennis World Championship was a real tennis (also called court tennis) tournament held at the International Tennis Club of Washington in McLean, Virginia in September 2023. Reigning champion Camden Riviere was challenged by first-time challenger John Lumley. Riviere won his third World Championship title, and his first successful defense, defeating Lumley 7 sets to 3.

== Qualification ==
As defending champion, Camden Riviere qualified by right to the World Championship Final. The right to challenge Riviere was determined through a series of eliminator matches. Due to the extraordinary nature of the previous edition being delayed by two years due to the COVID-19 pandemic, the timescale for qualification was altered. As many events had not been run and had no certainty of being run at the time of the announcement, any qualifying event between January 2020 and December 2022 was eligible for World Race points, a year greater than the normal qualifying period. The final qualification tournament was the British Open in November 2022. Former World Champion Robert Fahey announced his retirement from competitive singles tennis ahead of the British Open. Even though he had sufficient World Race points to enter the eliminator process, his spot was ceded to the next eligible player as an extraordinary measure. Four players were therefore eligible for the Eliminators:

1. (United Kingdom) John Lumley, Racquet Club of Philadelphia.
2. (United Kingdom) Ben Taylor-Matthews, Bristol Real Tennis Club
3. (Australia) Nick Howell, Aiken Tennis Club
4. (Australia) Chris Chapman, Royal Melbourne Tennis Club

First seed John Lumley competed in the Eliminator process for the first time. Lumley won two Open titles during the qualification period: the British Open in 2021 and the Australian Open in 2022, earning him the World number 2 ranking. He also won doubles titles at the Australian, British and French Opens in 2022. Lumley spent a year of the qualification period away from his home court of Philadelphia due to visa complications.

Ben Taylor-Matthews returned to the World Championship Eliminators for the third time, having previously played in the First Round Eliminators in 2012 and 2020, losing to Bryn Sayers and Chris Chapman respectively. During the qualification period, he reached the final of the 2021 British Open, losing to Lumley. He also reregistered his home club as Bristol, moving from the Leamington Tennis Court Club.

Nick Howell made his second appearance in a World Championship Eliminator, having previously played a First Round Elminator in 2020 against Camden Riviere at The Oratory School, which he lost in straight sets. Howell's best result in the qualification period was reaching the final of the 2020 US Open, held before the start of the COVID-19 pandemic. He also won the doubles competitions at the 2020 Australian Open and 2021 British Open. He moved twice during the qualification, firstly from the International Tennis Hall of Fame in Newport, Rhode Island to Bordeaux, and then on to Aiken Tennis Club in Aiken, South Carolina.

Chris Chapman qualified for a third consecutive Eliminator. He lost in the first round to Steve Virgona at the Royal Tennis Court, Hampton Court in 2018, and played the Final Eliminator against Riviere in 2020 at Boston. Chapman won the Australian Open in 2020 on his home court at the Royal Melbourne Tennis Club.

=== Eliminators ===
The format for the eliminators was unchanged from the previous edition, with the First Round Eliminator a two-day best of 9 set match and the Final Eliminator a three-day best of 13 set match. However the rule that following a single player winning the first four sets on the first day of a First Round Eliminator, the winning player could opt to play the fifth set on the first day was dropped. Hosting rights for the First Round Eliminators was held as a bidding process, favoured towards the better seed. As first seed, Lumley won hosting rights for his match to be at Philadelphia, while Howell out-bid Taylor-Matthews to host their eliminator at Aiken.

1st Round Eliminator	Final Eliminator
Philadelphia, 22, 24 March 2023
1	(United Kingdom) John Lumley	6	6	6	5	6	4	6	5
Philadelphia, 15, 17 May 2023
4	(Australia) Chris Chapman	2	4	4	6	4	6	0	2
1	(United Kingdom) John Lumley	6	6	6	6	6	6	5	6	7
Aiken, 29, 31 March 2023
2	(Australia) Nick Howell	3	1	2	4	0	0	6	2	1
3	(Australia) Nick Howell	6	5	6	6	2	6	6	5
2	(United Kingdom) Ben Taylor-Matthews	5	6	5	1	6	4	4	2

=== First Round Eliminators ===
The first eliminator was held at the Racquet Club of Philadelphia between John Lumley and Chris Chapman. Lumley took an early lead on the first day, taking the first set comfortably and holding on in the second and third. However, Chapman would claw back a set 6/5 to finish the first day on a high. Going into the second day, Lumley needed a further two sets. He managed the first, through dropped a very tight second set. In the third set of the day, Lumley cruised to victory 6/0 to progress to the Final Eliminator for this first time. It would be Chapman's last appearance in a World Championship Eliminator as he announced his retirement from international tennis during the 2023 British Open.

The second eliminator was held at the Aiken Tennis Club between Nick Howell and Ben Taylor-Matthews. Despite only moving to Aiken in the months prior to the event, the crowd were very vocal in their support of Howell. The first three sets of the match were closely fought, each going to 6/5, twice in the favour of Howell and once to Taylor-Matthews. Only the final set of the first day was one-sided, giving Howell a 3–1 lead going into the second day. There, Howell comfortably managed the final two sets required to progress to the Final Eliminator for the first time.

=== Final Eliminator ===
The Final Eliminator was hosted again at the Racquet Club of Philadelphia between Lumley and Howell, Lumley winning the bidding rights to host the event. The match was scheduled as a best of 13 set match over three days, Lumley won all four sets on the first day comfortably, and won the second two sets on the second day without dropping a game. Howell managed a solitary set 6/5, but Lumley closed strong to confirm his place as the World Championship Challenger.

== World challenge ==
The 2023 World Championship Challenge was held as a best of 13 set match between defending champion Camden Riviere and challenger John Lumley. In December 2022, the venue for the challenge was announced as the International Tennis Club of Washington at the Westwood Country Club in McLean, Virginia. The club had previously been barred from hosting major tournaments as their old court had a non-standard glass main wall. However following the closure of their old court, a new court was built at Westwood Country Club, opening in September 2022. The World Championship Challenge followed the 2023 US Ladies Open, the 2023 US Amateur and the 2023 Van Alan/George Limb/Clothier Cup as major events hosted at the new court.

The challenge was the first hosted in the United States since the 2016 World Championship in Newport, Rhode Island. It was the first challenge not to feature Robert Fahey since the 1993 World Championship in New York between Wayne Davies and Lachlan Deuchar, and the first not to feature an Australian since the 1981 World Championship between Chris Ronaldson and Howard Angus.

Head to Head	At World Championships	At Major Opens	At Prested Hall	Total Competitive
Camden Riviere	0	4	0	14
John Lumley	0	0	0	1

The pair had never played before in a World Championship or World Championship Eliminator. Lumley's only previous win over Riviere was in the 2013 USCTA National League. They had previously played against each other in two US Open Finals in 2021 and 2023 as well as two US Professional Singles Finals in 2021 and 2023. OF their previous meetings, all but one had been in the United States, the exception being the first round of the 2017 French Open. The two had previously competed against each other in doubles, with Riviere and Tim Chisholm defeating Lumley and Steve Virgona in the 2022 World Doubles Championship final in Bordeaux.

=== Day 1 ===
The match was marked by home professional Ivan Ronaldson, the first time that Andrew Lyons had not marked a World Championship Final since the 2002 World Championship at the Royal Tennis Court, Hampton Court. The first set was dominated by railroad serving, with Riviere holding on to his early lead 6/4. Riviere started the second set quickly, with a display of target hitting giving him a 4–0 lead which he held onto 6/2. The third set was much closer, with Lumley able to keep pace with Riviere through the first half of the set. Ultimately, Riviere converted to win that set 6/3. Lumley took the lead in the final set of the day, the first such time in the match, but Riviere found a late run to take all four sets on the first day.

=== Day 2 ===
Going into the second day, Riviere still needed three sets to win, while Lumley was looking to take the match into a third day. It began with Riviere takin three of the first four games before Lumley rallied the next three. Riviere had three game points to tie the first set at four all, but could not convert, with Lumley winning his first set at a World Championship. The second set was the reverse of the first; Lumley took the lead but struggled to capitalise on his opportunities leading Riviere to win five straight games to take the set. The third set of the day was the longest, with neither player having too much advantage. Riviere at one point had a 5–3 lead, but was suffering issues with his movement that allowed Lumley to claw back and take the set 6/5 and force the match into a third day. Lumley started the final set well, winning the first three games in less than 10 minutes. Riviere fought back well but in vain, with Lumley holding on to close out the day 3 sets to 1.

=== Day 3 ===
On the final day, Riviere needed two more sets, while Lumley needed to win four of five. Lumley attempted a more target-driven game, with neither player gaining a solid lead throughout the set. The set went to 5-all and deuce, with Riviere the victor in a set lasting 50 minutes. Riviere used that momentum to build his way through the second set of the day, winning the final set 6/3 and defending his World Championship title.

Preceded by Prested Hall; 2022	Real Tennis World Championship; Washington; 2023	Succeeded by Newport; 2025
