= 2024 Real Tennis World Doubles Championship =

- Date: 24-28 April
- Edition: 12th
- Category: IRTPA
- Draw: 4D
- Location: Chicago, Illinois
- Venue: Racquet Club of Chicago

Champions

Men's doubles
- (United States) Tim Chisholm / (United States) Camden Riviere
← 2023 ·	Real Tennis World Championship	· 2026 →

The 2024 Real Tennis World Doubles Championship (known in the US as the 2024 Court Tennis World Doubles Championship) was the 12th edition of the real tennis World Doubles Championship and was held at the Racquet Club of Chicago from April 24-28th 2024. The event was won by defending champions Tim Chisholm and Camden Riviere representing the United States. It was their fifth consecutive title, with Chisholm equalling Robert Fahey and Steve Virgona with 6 overall titles.

== Qualification ==
Qualification to the event was based on the World Doubles Rankings published by the IRTPA, with the defending champions automatically allocated as first seeds. Only the top four pairs were eligible, with eligibility determined by the sum of the ranking points of the players in the pair. At the conclusion of the final qualifying event, the 2024 US Open, the standings were as follows:

Rank	Player	Club	Points	Qualified
1	(United States) Camden Riviere	International Tennis Club of Washington	92676	Yes (with Chisholm)
2	(United Kingdom) John Lumley	Racquet Club of Philadelphia	60167	Yes (with Virgona)
3	(Australia) Nick Howell	Aiken Tennis Club	49518	Yes (with Fahey)
4	(Australia) Robert Fahey	The Oratory School	43480	Yes (with Howell)
5	(United Kingdom) Ben Taylor-Matthews	Bristol and Bath Tennis Club	37795	Yes (with Sayers)
6	(Australia) Steve Virgona	Racquet Club of Chicago	31688	Yes (with Lumley)
7	(United States) Tim Chisholm	Tuxedo Club	30208	Yes (with Riviere)
8	(Australia) Chris Chapman	Royal Melbourne Tennis Club	25889	No
9	(United Kingdom) Bryn Sayers	Queen's Club	22084	Yes (with Taylor-Matthews)
10	(United Kingdom) Leon Smart	Tennis and Racquet Club, Boston	19639	No
11	(United Kingdom) Darren Long	Manchester Tennis and Racquet Club	13001	No
12	(United Kingdom) Robert Shenkman	Manchester Tennis and Racquet Club	11906	No

Even though he was in the top eight players, Chris Chapman had retired from international competitions during the 2023 British Open. The four pairings were announced as:

1. (United States) Camden Riviere / (United States) Tim Chisholm (defending champions)
2. (Australia) Robert Fahey / (Australia) Nick Howell
3. (United Kingdom) John Lumley / (Australia) Steve Virgona
4. (United Kingdom) Ben Taylor-Matthews / (United Kingdom) Bryn Sayers

The pairings and seedings were exactly the same as the previous edition in 2022 in Bordeaux.

Riviere and Chisholm were a well established pair, having played together continuously since they won the US Open doubles in 2006. They first contest a World Championship together in 2007, reaching the final, and had been World Champions since 2015, winning five previous editions. Chisholm had also been World Champion at the inaugural event with Julian Snow, and Riviere was the incumbent singles World Champion. They were undefeated in the format since 2013 across all competitions.

Lumley and Virgona first played together at the 2012 French Open, reaching the final against Chisholm and Riviere. However they only started regularly playing together from the 2021 US Open onwards. Together, they won the 2024 Australian Open and reached the final of the 2024 US Open, losing to Riviere and Chisolm in 5 sets. Virgona had separately been the World Champion on 6 occasions from 2003 to 2013, partnering Robert Fahey.

Fahey and Howell began playing together at the 2017 US Open, and made their World Championship debut as a pair in Hobart in 2019. They won the 2021 British Open and were finalists in 2023. However, in the last tournament before the World Championships, they were upset in the quarter final at the 2024 US Open to Barney Tanfield and Freddie Bristowe. Fahey had been World Champion on 6 occasions with Steve Virgona from 2003 to 2013. Fahey retired from competitive singles play at the 2022 British Open but continued to play doubles competitions.

Sayers and Taylor-Matthews briefly played together in the 2010 season, competing at the French and British Opens together. They would briefly recombine in 2018, winning the IRTPA Professional Doubles, and would play the 2019 and 2021 British Opens together. Separately, they had each reached one World Doubles Championship final; Sayers in 2009 with Ricardo Smith and Taylor-Matthews in 2011 with Julian Snow. In their last match together before the championships, they were upset by Robert Shenkman and Darren Long in the quarter final of the 2024 US Open.

== World Championships ==
=== Venue ===
The event was hosted at the Racquet Club of Chicago and organised by the United States Court Tennis Association. The host country was determined by international rotation, in the order United Kingdom-Australia-France-United States. It would be the first world championship, male or female, singles or doubles, hosted in Chicago following the reopenining of the court tennis court in 2012. Chicago sacrificed hosting rights for the 2024 US Open - which is normally determined by rotation of clubs in the United States - in order to host the event. The Racquet Club of Chicago is the home club of Steve Virgona.

=== Results ===
Semifinals
April 24, 25
1	(United States) Camden Riviere (United States) Tim Chisholm	6	6	4	6	6	6	5
4	(United Kingdom) Ben Taylor-Matthews (United Kingdom) Bryn Sayers	1	1	6	2	4	5	1
April 24, 25
2	(Australia) Robert Fahey (Australia) Nick Howell	4	6	4	1	3	3	1
3	(United Kingdom) John Lumley (Australia) Steve Virgona	6	5	6	6	6	6	5

Final
April 27, April 28
1	(United States) Camden Riviere (United States) Tim Chisholm	1	6	3	6	6	6	6	5
3	(United Kingdom) John Lumley (Australia) Steve Virgona	6	5	6	3	3	3	5	2

=== Summary ===
The first day saw the first four sets of each of the semi finals. Play begain with Virogna and Lumley against Fahey and Howell, with three very tight sets with play lasting 3 hours and 40 minutes. The second seeds finally got a break in the fourth set to secure a 3–1 lead. Riviere and Chisholm blitzed the first two sets, before Sayers and Taylor-Matthews rallied to take the third set 6/4. The Americans then closed out the day to take a 3–1 lead into the second day.

Lumley and Virgona were too good for Fahey and Howell on the second day, winning both sets comfortably. The tension was in the second match, where Chisholm and Riviere were within one game of winning the match in the sixth set. Sayers and Taylor-Matthews clawed back a 3-game deficit to reach 5-all with the serve, but the defending champions laid two short chases to win the set and the match.

After the rest day, the day 3 saw the first four sets of the final. Lumley and Virgona dominated Chisholm and Riviere in the first set, and built a big lead in the second. Chisholm and Riviere clawed back the set to win 6/5 against the momentum of the match. Lumley and Virgona continued well into the third set, with Chisholm and Riviere finally gaining the momentum in the fourth set, the day finishing with the match level at two sets all. Chisholm reflected that their performance was poor and hoped to improve the following day. On the final day, Riviere and Chisholm returned to the dominant form they had displayed over the previous decade, maintaining momentum throughout the day and winning the required three sets to close out the match.
