= 2022 Real Tennis World Championship =

Tournament information
- Dates: September, 2022
- Venue: Prested Hall
- City: Feering, Essex
- Country: United Kingdom
- Organisation: IRTPA
- Defending champion: (Australia) Robert Fahey

Final
- Champion: (United States) Camden Riviere
- Runner-up: (Australia) Robert Fahey
- Score: 5/6 6/3 4/6 6/2 6/2 6/2 6/2 6/3 5/6 6/3 3/6 5/6 6/2

The 2022 Real Tennis World Championship was a real tennis tournament held at Prested Hall in Feering, Essex, England in September 2022. Rob Fahey, the 13-time and reigning world champion, was beaten by the challenger, and former champion, Camden Riviere. The challenge had been originally scheduled to take place in April 2020, but was postponed to September 2022 due to the ongoing COVID-19 pandemic.

== Qualification ==
As the defending champion, Robert Fahey qualified directly to the World Championship Challenge. The challenger was determined through a series of eliminator matches. Qualification to the eliminator matches was based on results in major tournaments in 2018 and 2019. Four players were declared eligible to compete:

1. (United States) Camden Riviere, Tennis and Racquet Club, Boston
2. (Australia) Chris Chapman, Royal Melbourne Tennis Club
3. (United Kingdom) Ben Taylor-Matthews, Leamington Tennis Court Club, Leamington
4. (Australia) Nick Howell, International Tennis Hall of Fame, Newport, Rhode Island

Former champion Riviere returned to the eliminators, having previously won the right to challenge on three occasions: 2008, 2014 and 2016. He did not participate in the eliminator process in 2018 as he was the defending champion. Despite a period away from the sport recovering from Lyme disease, he still managed to complete a Grand Slam in 2019. Alongside Tim Chisholm, he also retained the Doubles World Championship in Hobart in 2019.

Chapman qualified for the eliminators for a second consecutive cycle, having lost to Steve Virgona in the first round in 2018. Since the previous cycle, he won his first major open at the 2018 French Open, albeit in the absence of Riviere. In the same year, he also reached the final in the Australian and British Opens, rising through the rankings to a career-best number 3 spot. He also moved from his previous role at Hampton Court Palace to his native Melbourne.

Taylor-Matthews returned to the qualifiers for the first time since 2012, where he lost in the first round to Bryn Sayers. During the qualification period, he reached the final of the 2018 French Open; the first such appearance in a major singles tournament. He also won the doubles alongside John Lumley in the same tournament.

Howell qualified to the eliminators for the first time. He reached the finals of a major Open for the first time at the 2018 Australian Open. Alongside Rob Fahey, he won doubles titles at the 2018 Australian Open and the 2018 British Open and challenged for the 2019 Doubles World Championship.

== Eliminators ==
The format for the first round eliminators was unchanged from the previous year. However, the final eliminator was changed from a series of up to three home and away best-of-five set matches to a single best-of-thirteen set match at a single venue, mimicking the Challenge itself. In previous years, the matches were held on a home and away basis as three best-of-five set matches.

The venues for the first round eliminators were chosen via a bidding process. Each player had the right to put in a bid for their chosen court. The hosting rights of the Riviere-Howell match were won by The Oratory School in Woodcote, Oxfordshire. The right for the Chapman-Taylor Matthews match were won by the Royal Melbourne Tennis Club

1st Round Eliminator	Final Eliminator
The Oratory School, 27 January 2020
1	(United States) Camden Riviere	6	6	6	6	6	5
Boston, 24, 26 February 2020
4	(Australia) Nick Howell	3	1	1	4	2	0
1	(United States) Camden Riviere	6	6	6	6	6	1	6	6	7
Melbourne, 28, 30 January 2020
2	(Australia) Chris Chapman	3	0	1	5	4	6	1	1	1
3	(United Kingdom) Ben Taylor-Matthews	4	6	4	6	4	6	4	3	3
2	(Australia) Chris Chapman	6	1	6	4	6	4	6	6	5

=== First round eliminators ===
The first eliminator was held at The Oratory School in Woodcote, Oxfordshire between Nick Howell and Camden Riviere. The court had previously hosted the 2006 World Championship. Howell was an alumni from the school alongside his brother, Gloucestershire cricketer Benny Howell, while his father Jonathan Howell was formerly a real tennis professional at the school. The match was scheduled for two days, with a rest day in between, however if either player won four sets on the first day, they could elect to play the fifth set on the first day as well, negating the need for a second day. Indeed, Riviere was in top form, and won through the match in straight sets in a single day, although the capacity-crowd was supporting the local favourite.

The other eliminator was hosted by the Royal Melbourne Tennis Club, the new home court of Chris Chapman. Held following the Australian Open and Boomerang tournament, it was a close fought match with both players trading sets all the way through. After the first day, the match was tied at two sets apiece. The following day was tight as well, but Chapman managed to hold on to the eight set to win through to the final eliminator

=== Final eliminator ===
The final eliminator was a match between Riviere and Chapman. The match was played at the Tennis and Racquet Club in Boston, Massachusetts, the home court of Camden Riviere. The match was scheduled over three days but ultimately concluded in two. Chapman was only able to win a single set on the second day, as Riviere cruised to a 7–1 win.

== World challenge ==
The 2022 World Championship Challenge was held as a best-of-13 set match between defending champion Robert Fahey and former champion Camden Riviere. In March 2019, the venue for the challenge was announced as Prested Hall in Feering, Essex. At the time of announcement, it was the home court of Robert Fahey, although he and his wife Claire would move to The Oratory School in September 2020.

It was the first time that Prested Hall will host a Singles World Championship, although it did host the Doubles World Championship in 2017 where Camden Riviere and Tim Chisholm defeated Robert Fahey and Ricardo Smith. The only previous singles experience Camden Riviere has at Prested Hall was an IRTPA National League match against Ricardo Smith in 2007.

Head to Head	At World Championships	At Major Opens	At Prested Hall	Total Competitive
Robert Fahey	3	12	0	23
Camden Riviere	1	8	0	20

The pair have previously met in each of the last three World Championship challenges, two of which were won by Fahey, and one by Riviere. Their first meeting was in Fontainebleau, France in 2008, which was Riviere's first challenge. Then, Riviere had never before beaten Fahey, but gave a strong showing to win five sets from Fahey. They would next meet in Melbourne, Australia in 2014. Again, Fahey successfully defended his championship 7–3. Riviere won his first championship at his then-home club of Newport, Rhode Island in 2016. Fahey successfully challenged back for the championship in 2018 at Queen's Club, London two days prior to his 50th birthday. Apart from the two World Championship losses in 2014 and 2018, Riviere has defeated Fahey at every encounter since 2013. In 2019, Riviere completed the second Grand Slam of his career, although he missed several tournaments in 2018 and early 2020 due to recurring Lyme disease. Fahey completed his 50th career Major singles Open at the 2019 British Open, although Riviere was not present at that tournament. Prior to the match, Fahey revealed that he does not intend to challenge or defend his title after 2021, citing age and the effect of playing on his ankles.

=== Impact due to COVID-19 ===
On 12 March 2020, the IRTPA World Championship committee announced that the World Championships would not proceed in April 2020 as originally intended due to the government regulations relating to the COVID-19 pandemic. An initial date of October 2020 was proposed. On 17 March 2020, the Tennis and Racquets Association announced that all national real tennis tournaments in the United Kingdom as well as the 2020 French Open would be cancelled or postponed. From 25 March onward, all recreational level real tennis had ceased in Australia, France, the United States and the United Kingdom. Citing uncertainty around mass gatherings and spectators, the IRTPA World Championship committee announced a further postponement to May 2020. In February 2021, the final was pushed back again to September 2022.

=== Day 1 ===
The match was preceded by a minute of silence as the United Kingdom was in the mourning period following the death of Elizabeth II. The match was marked by Andrew Lyons, professional at the Seacourt Tennis Club. As in the previous World Championship in 2018, the first set was won by Fahey, lasting nearly an hour. Fahey had recovered from 2/4 down with three consecutive games. Riviere started strong in the second set, building a 3/0 lead as Fahey started aiming for the targets of the grille and dedans. Through a strong cut volley, Fahey punished any weak serves to win the third set from behind and guarantee that the match would go to a third day. Riviere took the final set quickly, leaving the day at 2-all.

=== Day 2 ===
Riviere took the momentum in the second day with improved serving accuracy and trademark floor speed. He was able to string several consecutive games together to win each of the first three sets of the day and take a 4/0 lead in the fourth. But a late surge from Fahey brought the score back to 5/5. After a dramatic point called a let where a spectator called from the galleries during play, Fahey took the final game of the day and the eighth set of the match

=== Day 3 ===
Needing only two more sets to win, Riviere ran away with the ninth set as Fahey wasn't able to dominate on the serve. However, momentum swung his way in the tenth set, as Fahey built a solid lead throughout the set, the first two-game lead since the first day. In the eleventh set, Riviere built a lead to 5/3 - one game away from the championship, but a steely Fahey saved several championship points until he had two set points of his own, which he converted. Finally, Riviere took the championship in the twelfth set, as Fahey faded towards the end of the match.

Preceded by Queen's Club; 2018	Real Tennis World Championship; Prested Hall; 2022	Succeeded by Washington; 2023
