= 2018 Real Tennis World Championship =

Tournament information
- Dates: 24, 26, 28 April 2018
- Venue: Queen's Club
- City: London
- Country: United Kingdom
- Organisation: IRTPA

Final
- Champion: (Australia) Robert Fahey
- Runner-up: (United States) Camden Riviere
- Score: 6/4 3/6 5/6 0/6 6/5 6/4 6/3 6/1 5/6 0/6 6/3 6/3

The 2018 Real Tennis World Championship was a real tennis tournament held at the Queen's Club in London, England. 12-time world champion Rob Fahey regained the world title defeating the defending champion Camden Riviere by a score of 7–5.

== Qualification ==
As the defending champion, Camden Riviere qualified directly to the World Championship Challenge. The challenger was determined through a series of eliminator matches. Qualification to the eliminator matches was based on results in major tournaments in 2016 and 2017. Four players were declared eligible to compete:

1. (Australia) Robert Fahey, Prested Hall Racket Club
2. (Australia) Steve Virgona, Racquet Club of Chicago
3. (Australia) Chris Chapman, Royal Tennis Court
4. (United Kingdom) Bryn Sayers, Queen's Club

This was the first year that Fahey had participated in the challenge tournament since 1994, as he had held the title of World Champion continuously until 2016. During the World Race, he won the 2016 Australian Open in Melbourne against Ben Taylor-Matthews and was runner up in both the 2016 and 2017 French Open as well as the 2017 US Open, losing in all cases to Camden Riviere. Before commencing the first round eliminator, he won the 2018 Australian Open in Hobart, although this did not count towards the World Race for 2018.

Virgona had qualified to be the World Championship challenger on two occasions: first in 2010 in Melbourne and again in 2012 at the Queen's Club, losing both times to Fahey. In both 2014 and 2016, he lost the final eliminator to Camden Riviere. During the qualification period, he was runner-up at both the 2016 US Open and 2017 Australian Open, again losing both times to Riviere.

Unlike the other qualifiers, this would be Chapman's first appearance in the World Championship eliminators, although he had competed in the early rounds of the World Doubles Championship. He was also the only competitor not to have previously won an open event. His best result was reaching the final of the 2016 British Open.

Sayers was competing in the challenge for the third time, having reached the final eliminator in 2014 and the first round in 2012, losing both times to Virgona. His best result in the qualification period was as runner-up in the 2017 British Open to world champion Camden Riviere.

== Eliminators ==
The format for the world championship eliminators was changed for 2018. In previous years, the matches were held on a home and away basis as three best-of-five set matches. In 2018, the first round eliminator were held at a single venue as a single best-of-nine set match, across two days. Four sets would be played on the first day, with the option for a fifth set if one player were to win the first four sets. The final eliminator would retain the home and away format.

The venues for the first round eliminators were chosen via a bidding process. Each player had the right to put in a bid for their chosen court, with the first and second seeds able to match their opponents bid if their bid was at least 80% of the rival bid. The third and fourth seeded players successfully out-bid their higher-seeded opponents, so the venues were the two London courts of Queen's and the Royal Tennis Court.

1st Round Eliminator
Queen's Club, 9–11 February 2018
1	(Australia) Robert Fahey	4	6	6	6	4	6	6	5
4	(United Kingdom) Bryn Sayers	6	3	1	5	6	4	5	2
Hampton Court, 8 February 2018
3	(Australia) Chris Chapman	1	2	4	2	3	0
2	(Australia) Steve Virgona	6	6	6	6	6	5

Final Eliminator Round 1
Chicago, 1 March 2018
1	(Australia) Robert Fahey	4	6	6	6	3
2	(Australia) Steve Virgona	6	4	3	1	1

Final Eliminator Round 2
Prested, 7 March 2018
1	(Australia) Robert Fahey	6	6	6	3
2	(Australia) Steve Virgona	2	3	2	0

=== First Round Eliminators ===
The first eliminator was held at the Queen's Club in London, the home court of Bryn Sayers. The venue also regularly hosts the British Open and was scheduled to host the World Championship challenge later that year. Only a few months prior, Sayers had defeated Fahey in four sets on the same court in the British Open semi-final. Sayers started strong, winning the first set 6/4, although Fahey brought back momentum to win the next two sets 6/3 and 6/1. The final set of the first day was a narrow-fought 6/5 to Fahey. On the second day, Fahey needed two sets to progress; Sayers needed four. Although Sayers won the first set of the day again, Fahey held onto two tight sets to win.

Across at the Royal Tennis Court at Hampton Court, the other match saw battle between the local professional Chris Chapman and his then-doubles partner Steve Virgona. Virgona dominated the play winning the first four sets of the day. He then opted to play the fifth and ultimately final set on the same day, winning it also and negating the need for a second day of play.

=== Final Eliminator ===
The Final Eliminator was a match-up between Virgona and Fahey. As the higher ranked player, Fahey had the choice of court for the second and third (if required) matches of the eliminator. Virgona elected to play the first match at his home club of Chicago. In the first Leg at Chicago, Virgona took an early lead in the best-of-five set match, taking the first set 4/6. But the visitor and former world champion came back strong, to take the leg in four sets. A week later at the second leg at Prested Hall, despite some tight games and excellent play, Fahey raced through in straight sets to return to the World Championship Challenge.

== World Challenge ==
The 2018 World Championship Challenge was held as a best-of-13 set match between defending champion Camden Riviere and 12-time former champion Robert Fahey. In March 2017, the venue for the challenge was announced as the Queen's Club in London. It was the eighth time Queen's would host a World Championship, having previously hosted in 1905, 1955, 1957, 1976, 1981, 1985, 1987 and 2012. It was also the venue for Jeu de Paume at the 1908 Olympic Games. Both the champion and the challenger had played regularly at the venue, as it hosts the annual British Open. However, they had not met in the British Open since the semi-final in 2012, where Fahey won in straight-sets.

Head to Head	At World Championships	At Major Opens	At Queen's Club	Total Competitive
Robert Fahey	2	12	4	22
Camden Riviere	1	5	0	16

The pair had previously met in three World Championship Challenges, all of which featured Fahey as the defending champion. Their first meeting was in Fontainebleau, France in 2008, which was Riviere's first challenge. Then, Riviere had never before beaten Fahey, but gave a strong showing to win five sets from Fahey. They would next meet in Melbourne, Australia in 2014. Again, Fahey successfully defended his championship 7–3. However, since then Riviere had an undefeated record over a four-year period which included winning the World Championship at his then-home club of Newport, Rhode Island in 2016. Riviere had won seven consecutive Major Opens including a Grand Slam, from the 2016 US Open to the 2017 British Open, after which he missed the 2018 Australian Open. Nonetheless, despite his age Fahey boasted an unrivalled pedigree in the sport, with 49 Major Opens and 12 World Championships, although he had only won five opens since 2013. Prior to the match, Fahey admitted "I'm going to be the biggest underdog since the 1930s" as his 50th birthday would be two days after the match's conclusion.

=== Day 1 ===
The match was attended by Prince Edward, Earl of Wessex and marked by Andrew Lyons, the former Queen's Club head professional. Despite a reputation for starting matches slowly, Fahey began the match by taking the first set 6/4. Riviere then applied the pressure throughout the remainder of the day, winning back the second set and narrowly gaining the advantage in the third as Fahey tried to hold on. By the fourth set, he was cruising and did not drop a game as Fahey started to look tired. At the end of the day, Riviere had a solid 3 sets to 1 lead.

=== Day 2 ===
Given his lead from the first day, his strong history and his opponent's age, many expected the second day to be all about Riviere. However Fahey fought back hard with a tight and varied serving game and strong power hitting, as Riviere struggled to find momentum from his high-energy style of play. The fifth and six sets took nearly an hour each, with momentum swinging back and forth, but ultimately, Fahey prevailed in both. A niggling hipinjury break to Riviere did not help, as Fahey went from strength to strength. Ultimately, Fahey won every set by increasing margins to recover a 5–3 lead in the match.

=== Day 3 ===
Going into the final day, Fahey needed only win two sets to recover his World Championship. The first set of the day was long and tight, with Riviere narrowly gaining the upper hand. He followed it up by winning the second set of the day comfortably to bring the match score to 5 sets all. Although it looked like the momentum was with Riviere he was struggling with his serve, which allowed Fahey to capitalise and fight back one last time to win the final two sets and thus the championship.

=== Result ===
Fahey won the match 7–5 to claim his record 13th World Championship. He also became the first male singles champion since Fred Covey in 1922 to recover the title after previously losing it. He re-established himself as the second-oldest world champion to Pierre Etchebaster, the match occurring two days prior to his 50th birthday. Upon claiming the trophy, he said "I used to think that I owned this trophy. Now I know I'm just borrowing it."

2018 Real Tennis World Championship
Player	Day 1				Day 2				Day 3				Total
(Australia) Robert Fahey	6	3	5	0	6	6	6	6	5	0	6	6	7
(United States) Camden Riviere	4	6	6	6	5	4	3	1	6	6	3	3	5

Preceded by Newport; 2016	Real Tennis World Championship; Queen's Club; 2018	Succeeded by Prested Hall; 2022
