= 2016 Real Tennis World Championship =

Tournament information
- Dates: 17, 19, 21 May 2016
- Venue: National Tennis Club
- City: Newport, Rhode Island
- Country: United States
- Organisation: IRTPA

Final
- Champion: (United States) Camden Riviere
- Runner-up: (Australia) Robert Fahey
- Score: 6/4 6/3 6/2 4/6 6/2 6/3 3/6 6/2 6/2

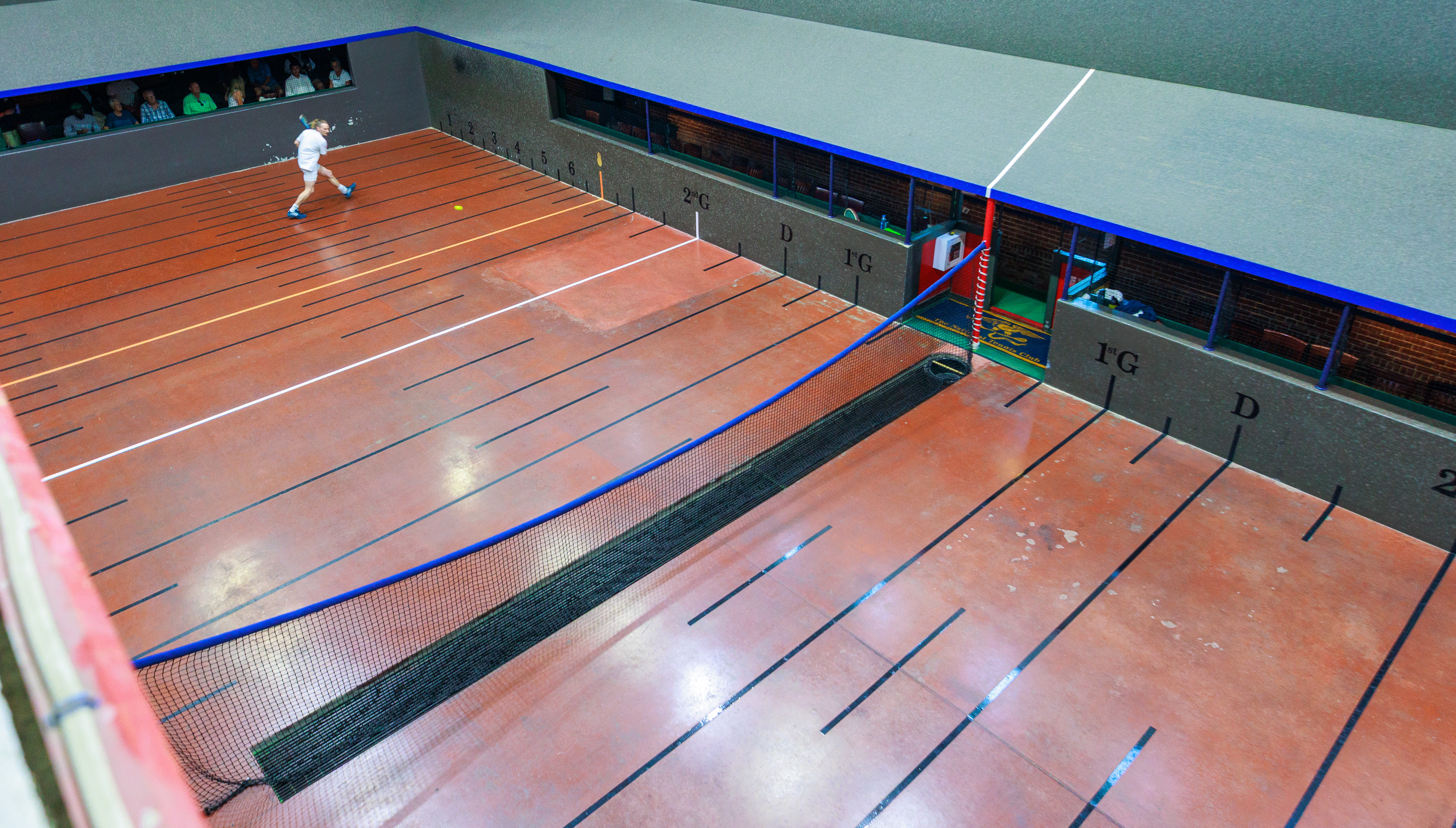
The court at the National Tennis Club in Newport

The 2016 Real Tennis World Championship was a real tennis tournament held at the National Tennis Club in Newport, Rhode Island. 12-time world champion Rob Fahey lost the championship for the first time since 1994 to challenger Camden Riviere by a score of 7–2.

== Qualification ==
As the defending champion, Robert Fahey qualified directly to the World Championship Challenge. The challenger was determined through a series of eliminator matches. Qualification to the eliminator matches was based on results in major tournaments in 2014 and 2015. Four players were declared eligible to compete:

1. (Australia) Camden Riviere, National Tennis Club, Newport, Rhode Island
2. (Australia) Steve Virgona, Racquet Club of Chicago
3. (Australia) Tim Chisholm, Tuxedo Club, Tuxedo, New York
4. (United Kingdom) Bryn Sayers, Queen's Club

Sayers opted not to participate in the first round eliminator, meaning that Riviere proceeded directly to the final eliminator.

Riviere had previously challenged for the world championship on two occasions, in 2008 and most recently in 2014, both times losing to defending champion Robert Fahey. He missed the 2012 challenge due to injury. During the qualification period, he won five Major Opens, including his first wins at the Australian and British Opens. Since 2013, he was ranked number one in the world rankings.

Virgona had qualified to be the World Championship challenger on two occasions: first in 2010 in Melbourne and again in 2012 at the Queen's Club, losing both times to Fahey. In 2014, he lost at the final eliminator stage to Riviere. During the qualification period, he won his seventh open title at the 2015 British Open as well as reached the final of three other Major Opens.

Chisholm had previously challenged three times for the world championship, all in the early 2000s. Each time, he lost to incumbent champion Robert Fahey. Although he had not won an open since 2004, he did reach the final of the 2015 British Open. Alongside Riviere, he won his first World Doubles Championship at his home club of Tuxedo in 2015.

== Eliminators ==
Due to Sayer's absence, Riviere received direct entry to the final eliminator. The first round would be held as a home-and-away format between the two qualified players. The final eliminator would be held at a single venue following a bidding process.

In the first round, both players opted to play at their home courts. As Virgona was ranked higher, the second and third match (if required) would be played at his home court of Chicago, while the first match would be played Tuxedo, the home court of Chisholm. The hosting right of the final eliminator was won by the Racquet Club of Philadelphia.

1st Round Eliminator
Tuxedo, 12 March 2016
3	(United States) Tim Chisholm	4	2	6	6	4	2
2	(Australia) Steve Virgona	6	6	0	5	6	3

1st Round Eliminator
Chicago, 17 March 2016
3	(United States) Tim Chisholm	2	5	4	0
2	(Australia) Steve Virgona	6	6	6	3

Final Eliminator
Philadelphia, 6–10 April 2016
1	(United States) Camden Riviere	6	6	5	6	6	4	6	6	6	7
2	(Australia) Steve Virgona	3	2	6	1	2	6	5	2	3	2

=== First Round Eliminator ===
The first match was a narrow fought five set affair, with Virgona winning a close fifth set at Chisholm's home court. On the second leg at Virgona's home court, Virgona won in straight sets.

=== Final Eliminator ===
The Final Eliminator was hosted over three days at the Racquet Club of Philadelphia. On each of the first two days, Riviere won three sets to one for Virgona. Riviere needed just one set on the final day to qualify for the Championship challenge, which he did comfortably.

== World Challenge ==
The 2016 World Championship Challenge was held as a best-of-13 set match between defending champion Robert Fahey and world number 1 Camden Riviere. The venue for the challenge the National Tennis Club at the International Tennis Hall of Fame in Newport, Rhode Island, the home court of Camden Riviere. It was the second time that the National Tennis Club had hosted the World Championship. The previous challenge in Newport was in 2004, where Fahey successfully defended against Tim Chisholm. The venue also regularly hosts the US Pro Singles, otherwise known as the Schochet Cup. Their last meeting at the venue was at the 2014 US Pro Singles, where Riviere won in 4 sets.

Head to Head	At World Championships	At Major Opens	At Newport	Total Competitive
Robert Fahey	2	12	1	22
Camden Riviere	0	1	4	10

The pair had previously met in twice in World Championship Challenges, all of which featured Fahey as the defending champion. Their first meeting was in Fontainebleau, France in 2008, which was Riviere's first challenge. Then, Riviere had never before beaten Fahey, but gave a strong showing to win five sets from Fahey. Their second meeting was at the Melbourne, Australia in 2014. Again, Fahey successfully defended his championship 7–3. Since then, the pair had only met twice, first at the 2014 US Pro at the National Tennis Club in Newport, Rhode Island, and the 2015 US Open in Boston, both times Riviere won in 4 sets. Since the last World Championships, Fahey had also won the 2014 Australian Open and 2015 French Open.

=== Day 1 ===
The match was marked by Andrew Lyons, the head professional at the Queen's Club. The match started evenly, but Riviere soon found a winning streak, racing from 3-all in the first set, to win it 6/4 and take a 3 game lead into the second set. The match evened up, with Riviere holding his advantage to take the second set as well. Fahey took an early lead in the third, but Riviere surged back to win five games without reply and a three set lead. The fourth set was close all the way through, with Fahey holding on to bring the score back to 3-1.

=== Day 2 ===
Riviere took an early lead in the fifth set, and although Fahey started to match Riviere, the advantage was enough for Riviere to take the first set. It was a similar outcome in the sixth set. Finally, in the seventh, Fahey took an advantage and despite Riviere drawing level, managed to win his second set of the match, thus pushing the match into a third day. The final set of the day see-sawed between both players, with Riviere ultimately the winner.

=== Day 3 ===
As with the final eliminator, Riviere needed just one set on the third day to win the match. He did that comfortably, taking the set 6/2 after establishing a solid 5/1 lead.

=== Result ===
Riviere won the match 7-2 to become the 25th person to hold the title of Real Tennis World Champion. He was the first American to hold the title since Jimmy Bostwick in 1974. It was the first time that Fahey had lost a World Championship challenge, after winning 12 consecutive titles from 1994 to 2014.

2016 Real Tennis World Championship
Player	Day 1				Day 2				Day 3	Total
(Australia) Robert Fahey	4	3	2	6	2	3	6	3	2	2
(United States) Camden Riviere	6	6	6	4	6	6	3	6	6	7

Preceded by Melbourne; 2014	Real Tennis World Championship; Newport; 2016	Succeeded by Queen's Club; 2018
