= National Tennis Club =

Court tennis club in Newport, Rhode Island

Coordinates: 41°28′56.3″N 71°18′22.7″W

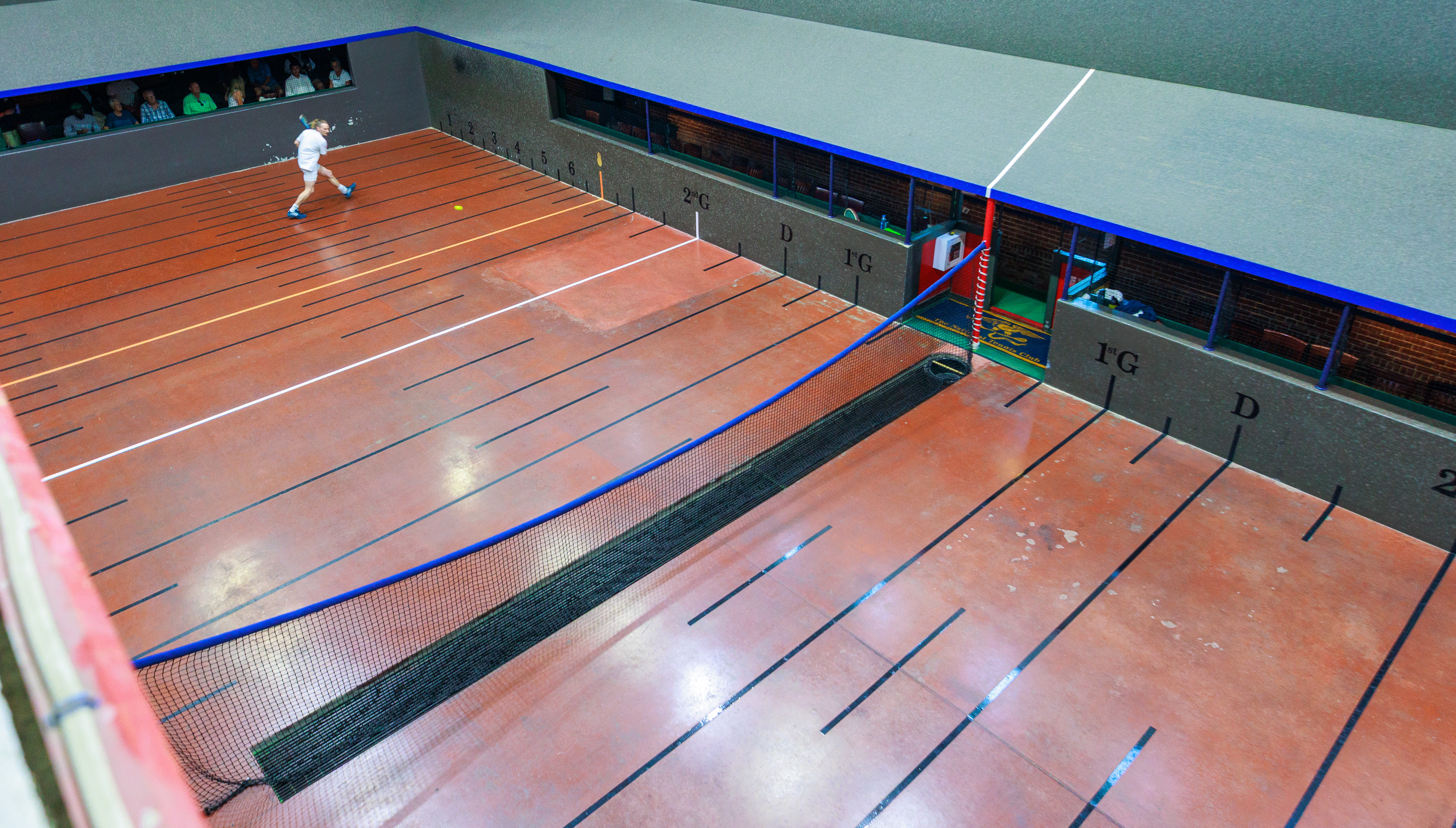
- Established: 1880 / re-established 1980
- Type: Court Tennis, Sport Club
- Location: Newport, Rhode Island, United States
- President: Ross Cann
- Vice-president: Tom Rowe
- Website: http://nationaltennisclub.org/

The National Tennis Club (NTC) is a court tennis (also known as "real tennis") club in Newport, Rhode Island, United States. Its home is the reconstructed Court Tennis Building at the Newport Casino. The National Tennis Club hosted the Real Tennis World Championship match in 2004, when Robert Fahey successfully defended his title against Tim Chisholm. The Court Tennis Building was constructed as part of the original Casino complex in 1880 and in 1980 the National Tennis Court was rededicated, largely through the efforts of Clarence "Clarry" Pell, as the symbolic home of the sport in the United States.

== Origins ==
Court tennis, also known as "real tennis", is the original indoor racquet sport from which the modern game of lawn tennis (usually simply called tennis) is descended. It is known as court tennis in the United States, royal tennis in Australia, and courte-paume in France. The expression "real" was primarily used by journalists in the mid-20th century to distinguish the ancient game from modern "lawn" tennis (even though the sport is rarely played on lawns today, outside the few social-club managed estates such as Wimbledon).

Real tennis is played today on 45 existing courts in the United Kingdom, Australia, the United States, and France.

Despite a documented history of courts existing in the German states during the 17th century, real tennis eventually died out there during or after the World War II reconstruction.

== Game description ==
The rules and scoring are similar to those of lawn tennis. In both sports game scoring is by fifteens (with the exception of 40, which is shortened from 45), however in real tennis the player with six games wins a set even if the opponent has five games. A match is typically best of three sets, except for the major open tournaments in which the matches are best of five sets. Another difference is that unlike the latex-based technology underlying the modern lawn-tennis ball, real tennis still utilizes a cork-based ball very close in design to the original ball used in the game, which are much less bouncy than lawn tennis balls and weigh about 2 1/2 ounces (compared to the lawn tennis ball weighing at 2 ounces). Real tennis also uses long racquets (27 inches) made of wood and use very tight strings to cope with the heavier balls.

A real tennis court is enclosed by walls on all four sides, three of which have sloping roofs, known as "penthouses." A game of real tennis has characteristic features such as the various window-like openings below the penthouse roofs that offer players a chance to win the point instantly by hitting the ball into the opening.

== History ==
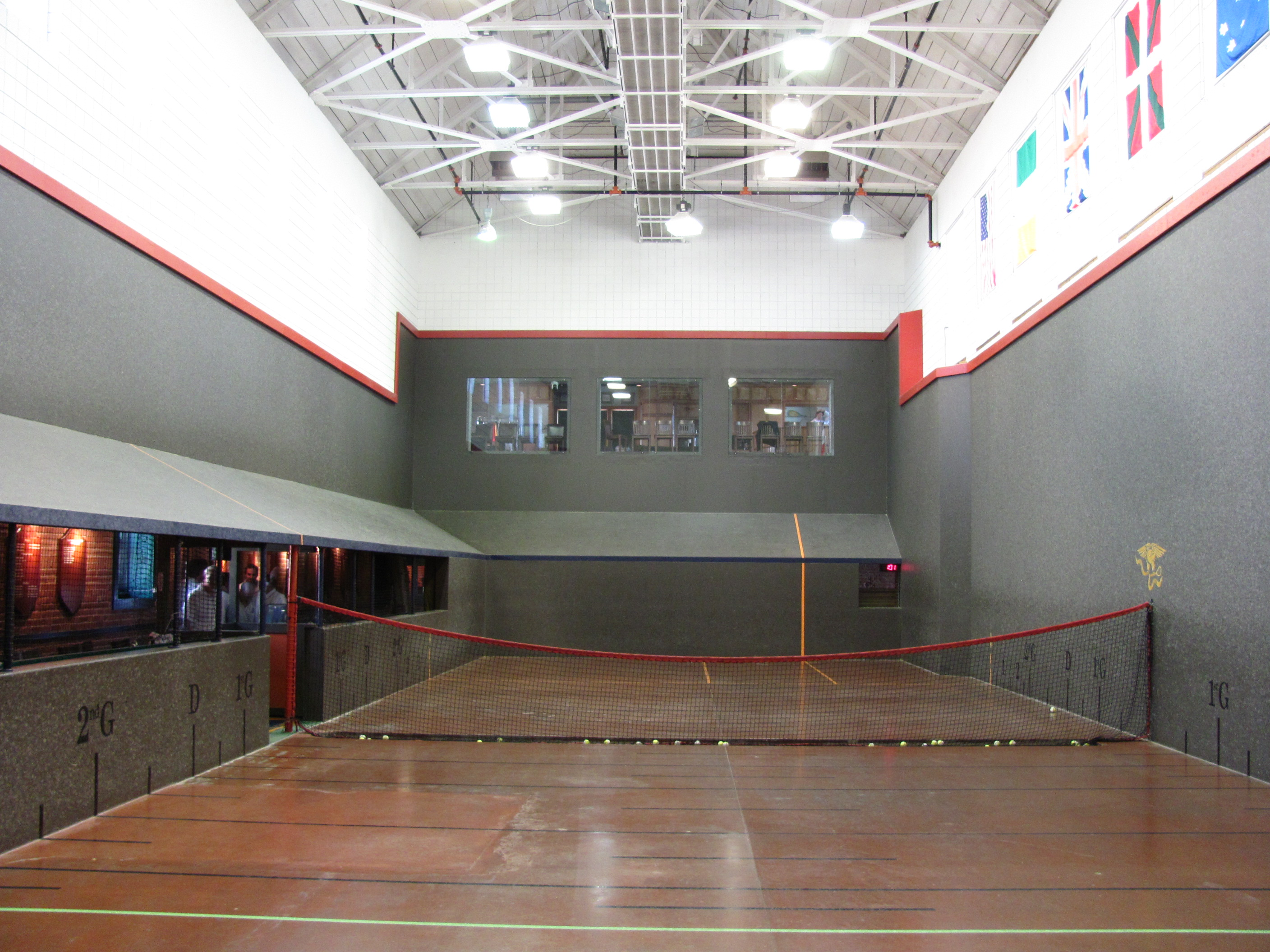
The National Tennis Court

The National Tennis Club (NTC) was formed in 1980 when the original court tennis court, destroyed by a series of arsenic fires in 1945 and 1946, was completely rebuilt. The only thing that remains original is the floor and some of the lower walls, dating back to 1880.

A group of devoted players and enthusiasts, the National Court patrons, including the former President, Clarence C. Pell, provided funding for the restoration through the United States Court Tennis Association (USCTA). The informal reopening of the court, known as the National Tennis Court, occurred on September 29, 1979. The official dedication was observed in August, 1980, following ceremonies at the conclusion of the first world doubles tournament for the Tiffany Cup.

The National Tennis Court has been considered to be the official court of the USCTA since its restoration in 1980. As the game has grown, new institutions have been formed, such as the U.S. Court Tennis Preservation Foundation (USCTPF) to provide complementary leadership and funding for this amateur game.

The Club originally was only opened for play in summer months, but the court is now in use year round. The club has an active membership of approximately 100 players. It is also one of the busiest court tennis courts in the United States and has a program for all levels, including club handicaps, inter-city play, night leagues, and national and international tournaments. Club members compete worldwide.

The Club has been led by its governors, Jonathan Isham, Barclay Douglas, Sr., Clarry Pell, Jim Wharton, Jonathon Pardee and Jane Lippincott.

=== Membership ===
Resident Active Membership

These members may use the court for singles and doubles matches throughout the year and are eligible to enter all club events and tournaments and championships for which they qualify by handicap.

Non-Resident Membership

This category is available to individuals and families who reside further than 40 miles from the court and are limited to 50 hours of court time annually. Some members who qualify for non-resident membership will choose the Active category so that they are not limited on court hours. They are eligible to enter all club events and tournaments and championships for which they qualify by handicap.

Social Membership

Social members receive all club mailings and invitations to social events.

International Membership

For individuals who live overseas but who wish to support the National Tennis Club there is the International category. They are limited to 5 hours of court time annually without charge.

Junior Membership

For individuals who are 25 years or younger, the junior membership is available. Support for weekly instructions and trips to tournaments at other clubs are provided at this category. The goal of this category is to train and encourage the players of tomorrow.

Taste of Tennis

This program is for beginners to give the game a try and includes 60 days of full court usage, the loan of a racquet and an introductory lesson with the club professional.

== See also ==
- Real tennis
