= Bristol and Bath Tennis Club =

Real tennis club in the West of England

The Bristol and Bath Tennis Club was founded in 1985 by a small group of enthusiasts with the aim of providing a real tennis facility for people in Bristol, Bath, and adjacent areas in the southwest of England.

Their efforts culminated in the construction of a new real tennis court situated on Clifton College's Beggar Bush Playing Fields during 1997. Since then several hundred players have sampled the game for the first time, and the club has an established membership approaching 350.
