= Aiken Tennis Club =

- Court Tennis Building
- U.S. National Register of Historic Places
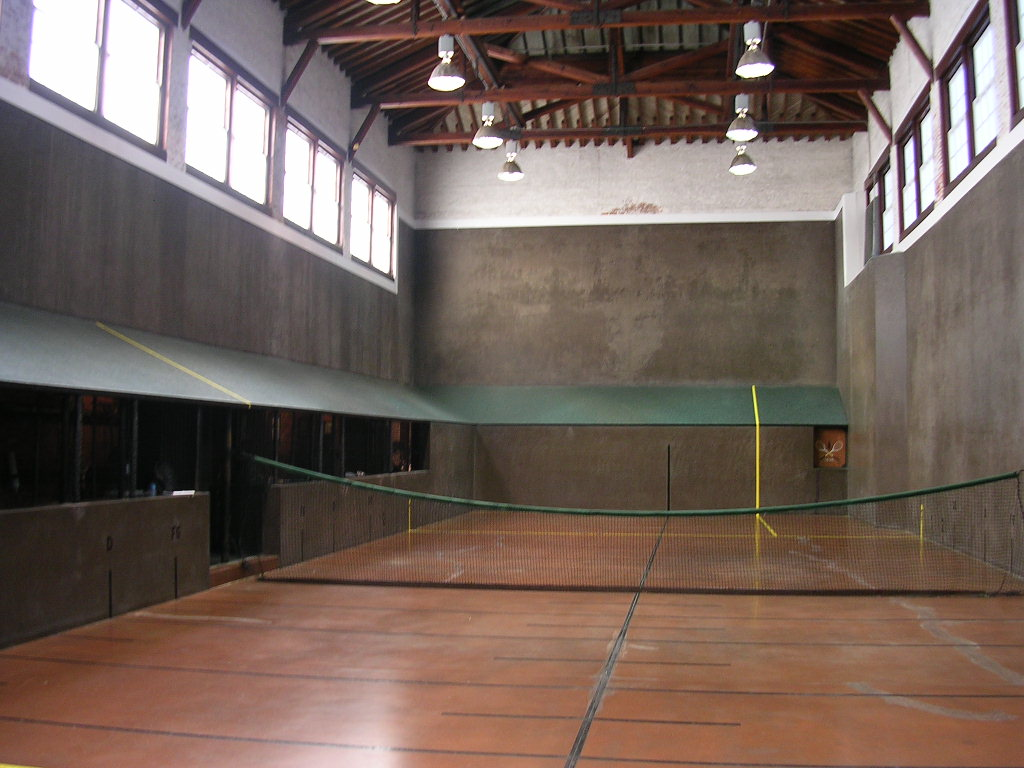
- View of the court.

- Location within South Carolina Location within the United States
- Location: Newberry and Park Sts., Aiken, South Carolina
- Coordinates: 33°33′34″N 81°43′17″W
- Area: 0.4 acres (0.16 ha)
- Built: 1902; 124 years ago
- MPS: Aiken Winter Colony TR
- NRHP reference No.: 84000513
- Added to NRHP: November 27, 1984

The Aiken Tennis Club is a private court tennis club located at 146 Newberry Street, SW in Aiken, South Carolina. It includes the Court Tennis Building. The club was incorporated in 1898 with the sponsorship of financier and founder of the prominent Whitney family, William C. Whitney. The building was constructed around 1902 and listed on the National Register of Historic Places on November 27, 1984.

The Aiken Tennis Club is the world's most equatorial court tennis (also known as "real tennis") venue, and one of only two American courts south of the Mason–Dixon line (the other is the International Tennis Club of Washington).

Former world champions who have played on the court include Northrup R. Knox, G.H. "Pete" Bostwick, Jr., Jordan Toole, Jimmy Bostwick, Wayne Davies, Robert Fahey, and Camden Riviere. The most notable competition was the world championship challenger match between Ruaraidh Gunn and Camden Riviere on March 8, 2008.
