= Prested Hall =

Country house hotel in Feering, Essex, England

Coordinates: 51.8435°N 0.7323°E

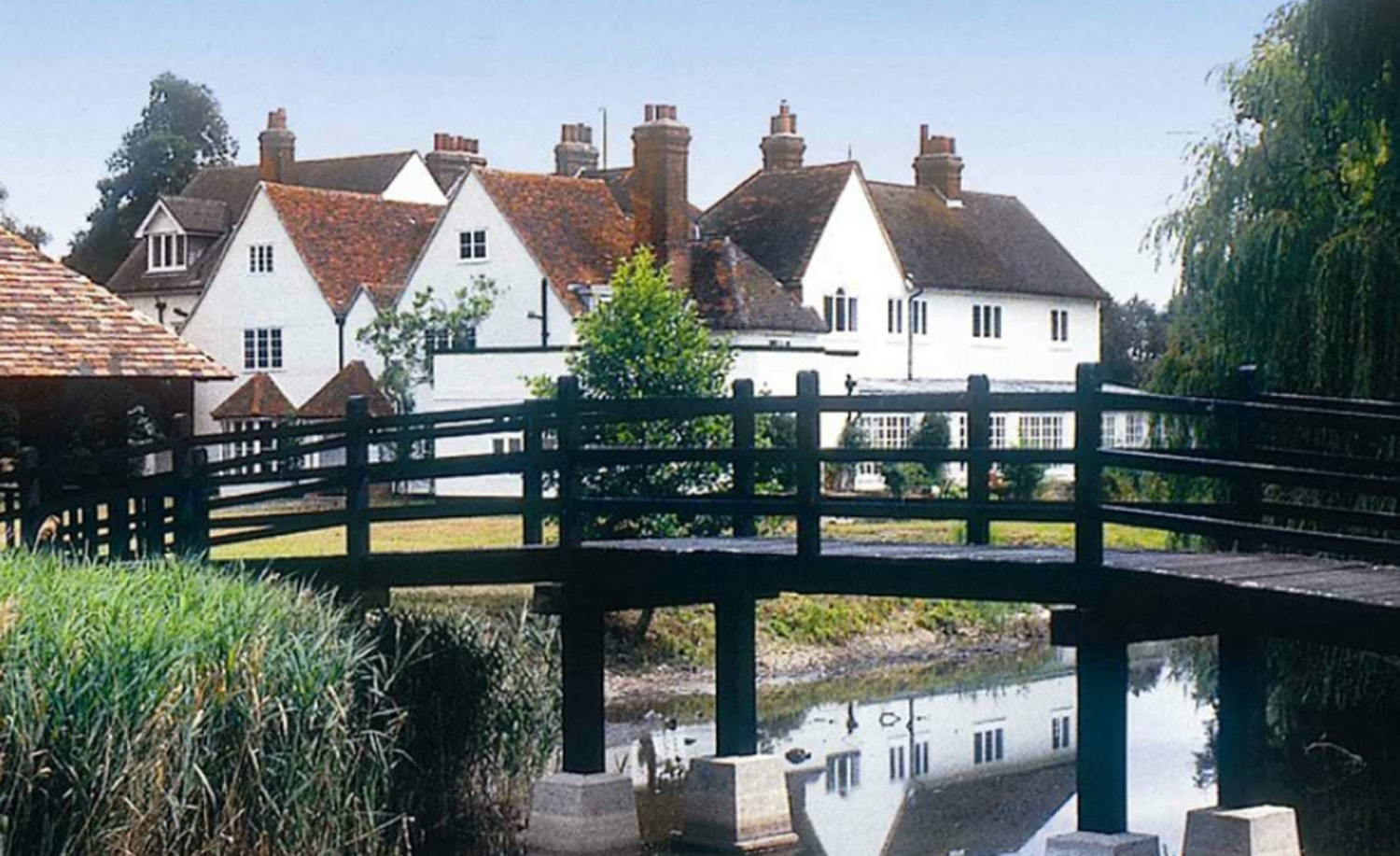
Prested Hall

Prested Hall is a country house in Feering, Essex. It was built in the fourteenth century for the Weston family and passed through several notable families over the next six hundred years. Now Prested Hall is a Boutique Wedding and Events venue with Elemis SPA, Health Club, 20-bedroom accommodation, and Real Tennis & Padel Tennis. It is probably the only hotel in the world with 2 courts of Real tennis, the original game of tennis whose origins can be traced to the 14th century. It is a Grade II listed building.

== Early history ==
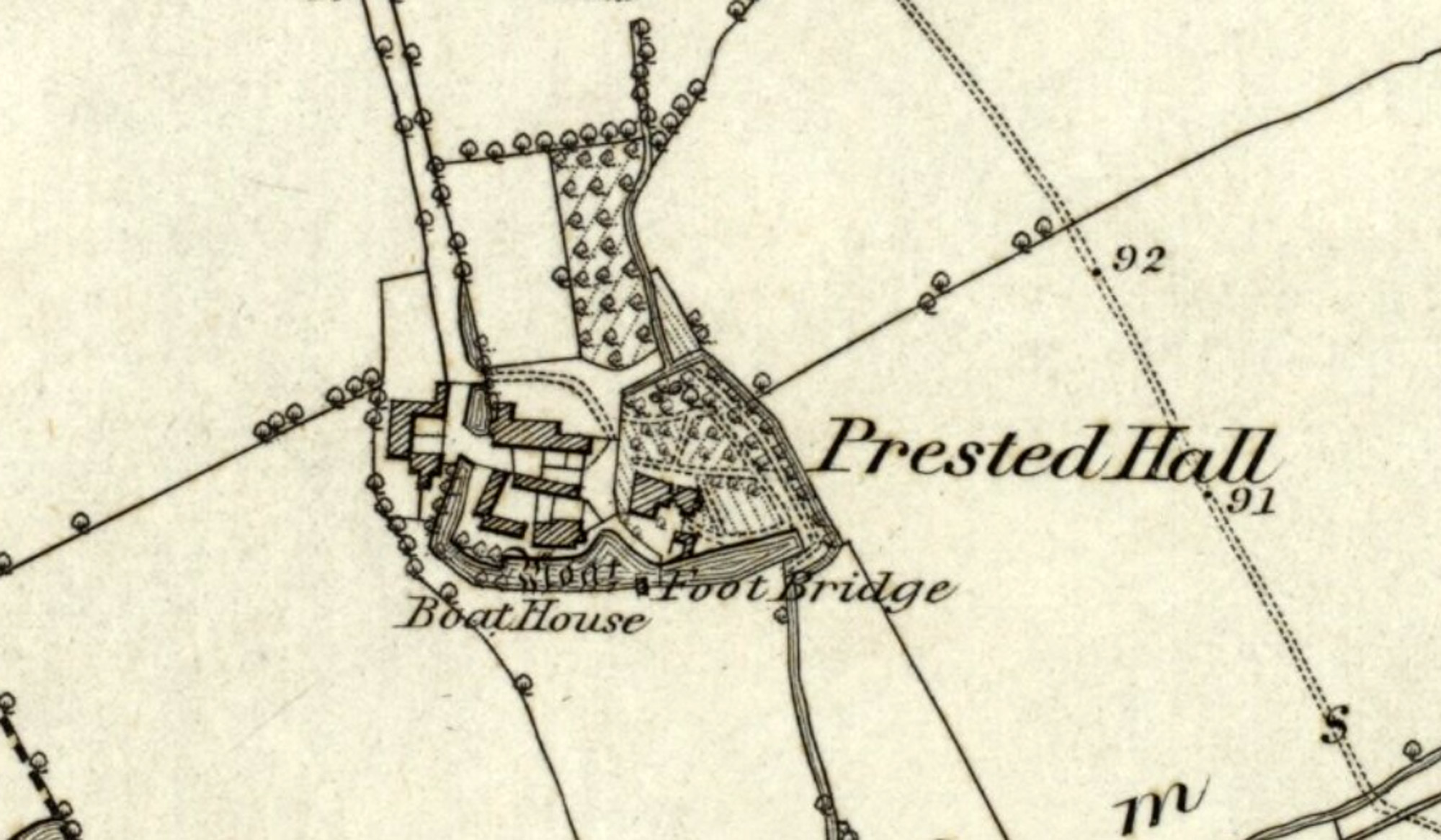
Map of Prested Hall, 1874

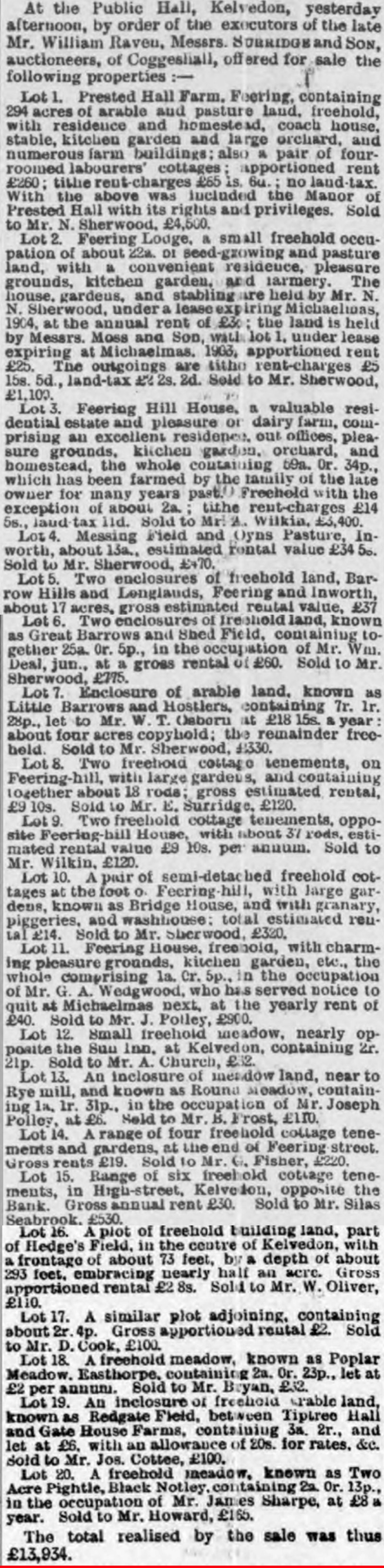
Feering property of William Raven sold in 1898

Domesday Book of 1086 mentions the site and at this time it was known as Peresteda. It was owned by Ranulf Peverel who was a knight in the service of William the Conqueror. William rewarded his followers by giving them numerous fiefdoms. Before the conquest Peverel had no land at all but after 1066 he owned 37 different manors one of which was Preston Hall.

By 1360 the manor was owned by Humphrey de Weston and the Weston family flourished here until the beginning of the seventeenth century. The last member of the Weston family was Robert Weston who had no sons to inherit Prested Hall. When he died in 1601 his heir was his daughter Amye who married Dean Tyndale thereby bringing the house into the Tyndale family.

Their son John Tyndale had only one child - his daughter Elizabeth. A document of 1701 shows that he passed the property to Jasper Blythman, Elizabeth’s husband as part of a marriage settlement. In 1707 Blythman leased the estate to Daniel Eley. At some stage during this century it seems that the Eley (sometimes called Ely) family bought the property as it was owned by them until about 1800.

In 1800 John Eley of Prested Hall died. The property passed to his son also called John Eley. It appears that he sold it because by 1814 it was owned by William Raven. William Raven (1766-1841) was a very wealthy landowner who owned numerous properties in Feering including Feering Hill House. He moved to this house some years later and leased Prested Hall to tenant farmers.

Francis Hills (1806-1881) was one of these tenants and he is recorded in the 1851 Census as living there with his wife Hannah and six children. He remained at the Hall with his family until shortly before his death. His son John Harrison Hills took over the running of Prested Hall and is shown in the 1881 and 1891 census as living there with his wife Lucy. He later moved to Messing.

When William Raven died in 1841 he left all of his Feering properties including Prested Hall to his eldest son John Cornwell Raven. He died in 1869 and left the Hall to his two sons Cornwell Raven (1843-1894) and William Raven (1845-1898). When the younger son William died in 1898 all of the Feering properties owned by the Ravens were put on the market and many of them were bought by Nathaniel Newman Sherwood. A notice about these properties and the people who bought them is shown.

== The Sherwood family ==
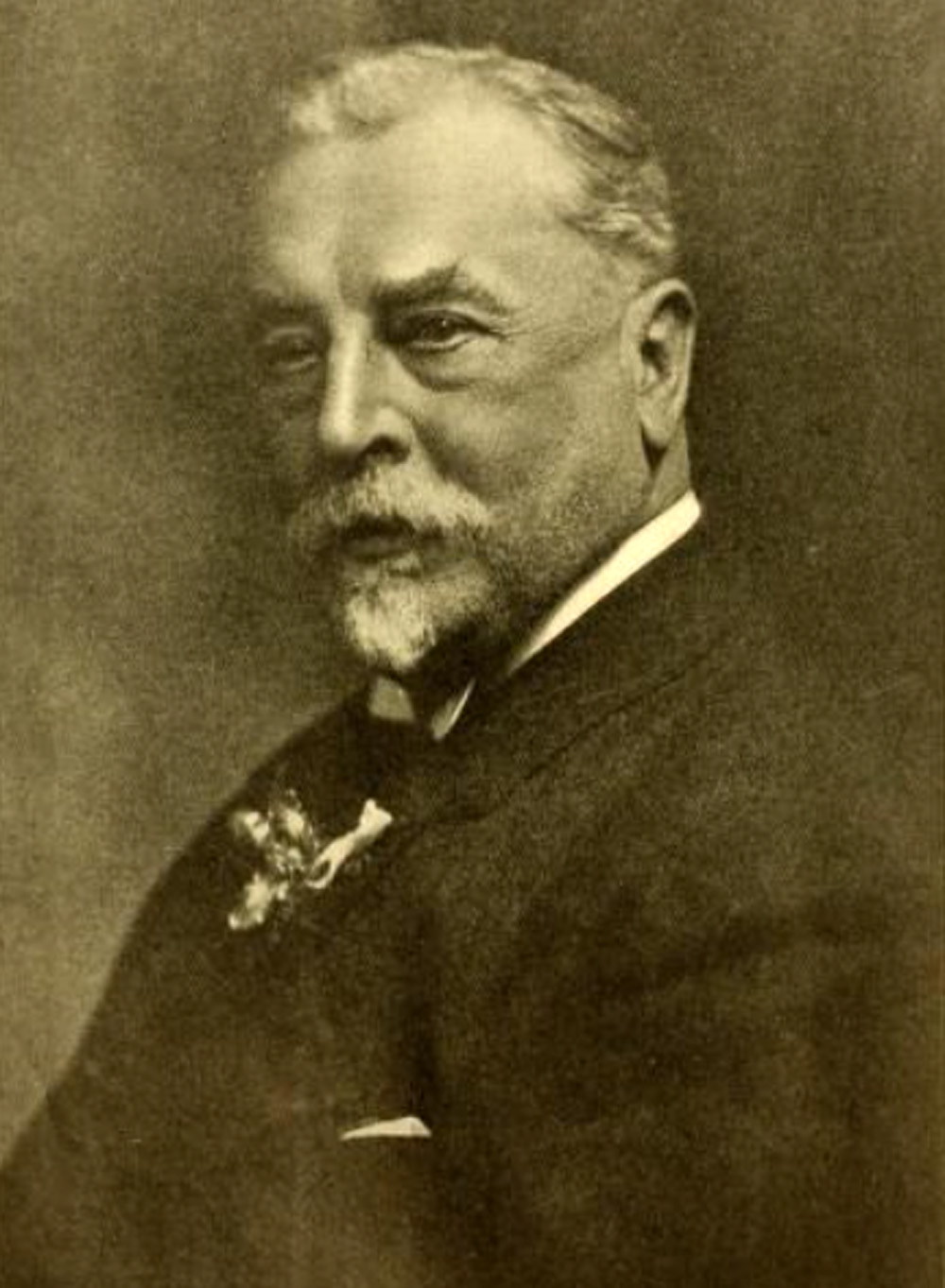
Nathaniel Newman Sherwood

Nathaniel Newman Sherwood (1846-1916) was born in France in 1846. His father Newman Sherwood was a builder and he wanted Nathaniel to become an engineer. For two years he was apprenticed to his uncle who was an engineer on the Great Eastern Railway but this work was not to his liking so in 1862 he entered the firm Hurst and Son who were wholesale seed merchants. After only six years he became a partner in the company. In 1873 he married the owner’s daughter Emma Hurst and the couple went to live in Streatham. They later moved to a house called Dunedin in Streatham Hills. They had three children two sons and one daughter. Unfortunately his wife Emma died in 1883 at the age of only 43.

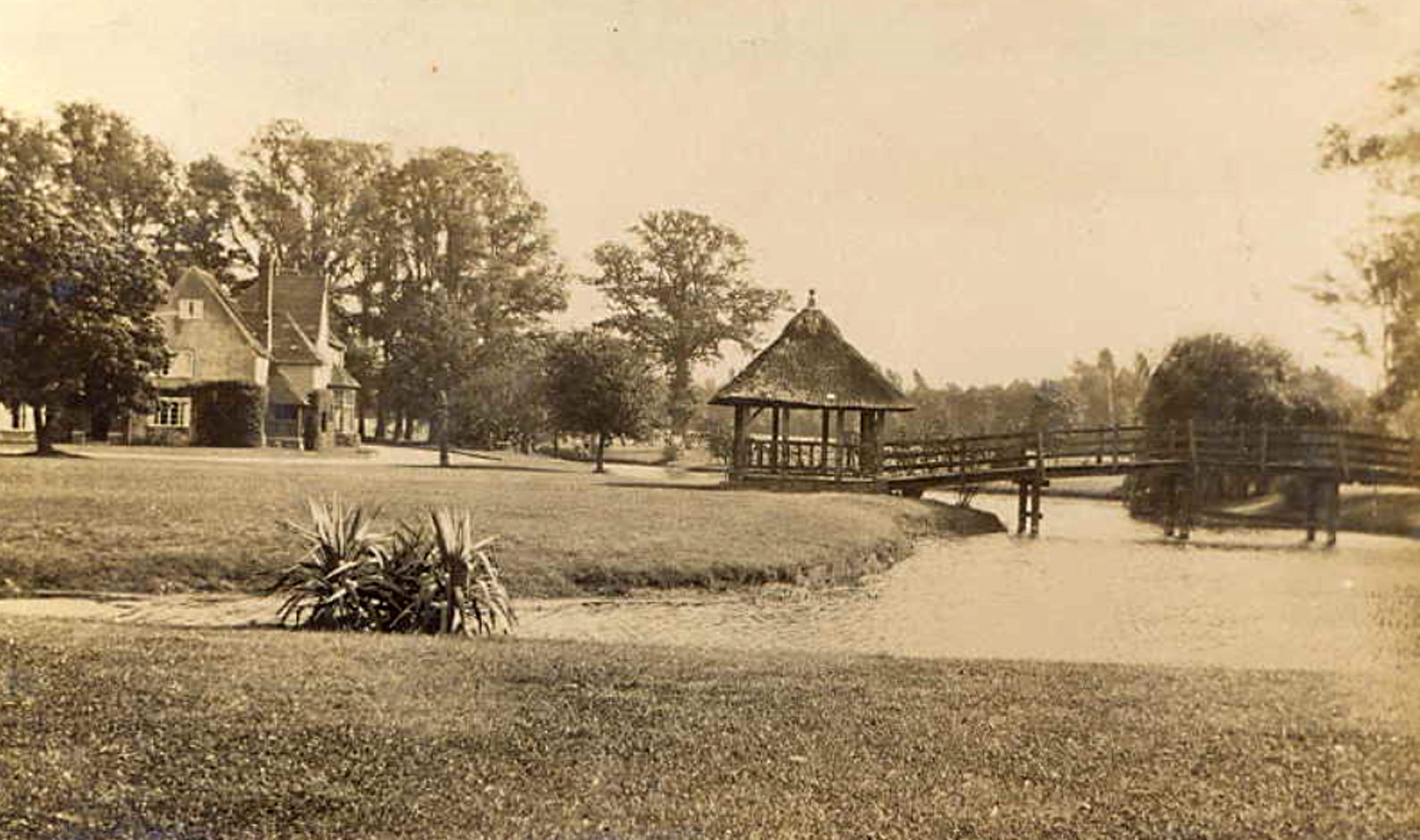
Prested Hall in 1925

In 1890 he became the sole owner of Hurst and Son but his two sons assisted him with the operations of the company. He amassed a large fortune and bought numerous properties many of them in Feering. From about 1890 after the Hill family left he used Prested Hall as a hunting lodge and acquired the other surrounding estates in 1898 (a list of these is shown in the notice above). He continued to live at Streatham Hills for some years then later moved to Prested Hall.

He was one of the founders of the National Sweet Pea Society and in 1910 was its president. It was this society that brought him fame in the gardening world as many gardening magazines mentioned his work. In 1910 the United States journal called “The American Florist” published an article about him with accompanying photo which can be seen here He was also the subject of a feature article in 1912 in the English magazine called “The Garden” with a photo which is shown.

He was the Treasurer to the Royal Gardeners Orphan Fund and generously donated to this institutions. When the Royal Horticultural Society decided to create a Victoria Medal of Horticulture, Sherwood was one of the recipients. He died in 1916 and left Prested Hall to his younger son John Edward Newman Sherwood.

John Edward Newman Sherwood (1878-1939) called Edward was born in London. He was educated at Cheltenham College. In 1896 at the age of 18 he entered his father’s firm of Hurst and Son seed growers and became joint manager with his elder brother William. When his father died in 1916 he and his brother became the sole proprietors. In 1923 he married Florence Sybil Keeling (1895-1987). Like his father he joined many seed and horticultural societies and was an active community member. He was a gifted musician and held many musical events at Prested Hall. He died in 1939 and although the Sherwood family continued to own the Hall they did not live there ever again. It was requisitioned by the army during the War and afterwards was a nursing home. In 1994 it was bought by Real Tennis enthusiast Mike Carter, who turned it into a hotel and built the only privately funded pair of Real Tennis courts in the world.
