= Racquet Club of Chicago =

Social and athletic club in Chicago, Illinois

Coordinates: 41°54′27″N 87°37′47″W

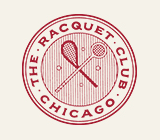
- Type: private social club and athletic club
- Founded: 1922
- Location: 1365 North Dearborn Parkway, Chicago, Illinois
- Activities: Rackets, squash, real tennis
- Website: www.rcc.club

The Racquet Club of Chicago is a private social and athletic club in the Gold Coast neighborhood of Chicago, Illinois. Founded in 1922, the club opened its clubhouse at Dearborn Parkway and Schiller Street in 1924. The clubhouse was designed by Andrew Rebori's firm, Rebori, Wentworth, Dewey and McCormick.

== History ==
Organizers acquired property at the southeast corner of Dearborn and Schiller streets in 1922 and began clearing the site that November. The clubhouse formally opened to members on July 9, 1924.

The club's original real tennis court opened in 1924 and was converted for lawn tennis in 1936. After the club's board approved a restoration in November 2011, work began in February 2012 using the original plans and surviving floor. Formal play resumed on August 1, 2012, followed by club and international opening events in September and October.

From April 24 to 28, 2024, during the centennial year of the clubhouse opening, the club hosted the World Doubles Championship. It was the first court-tennis world championship held in Chicago.

== Clubhouse and facilities ==
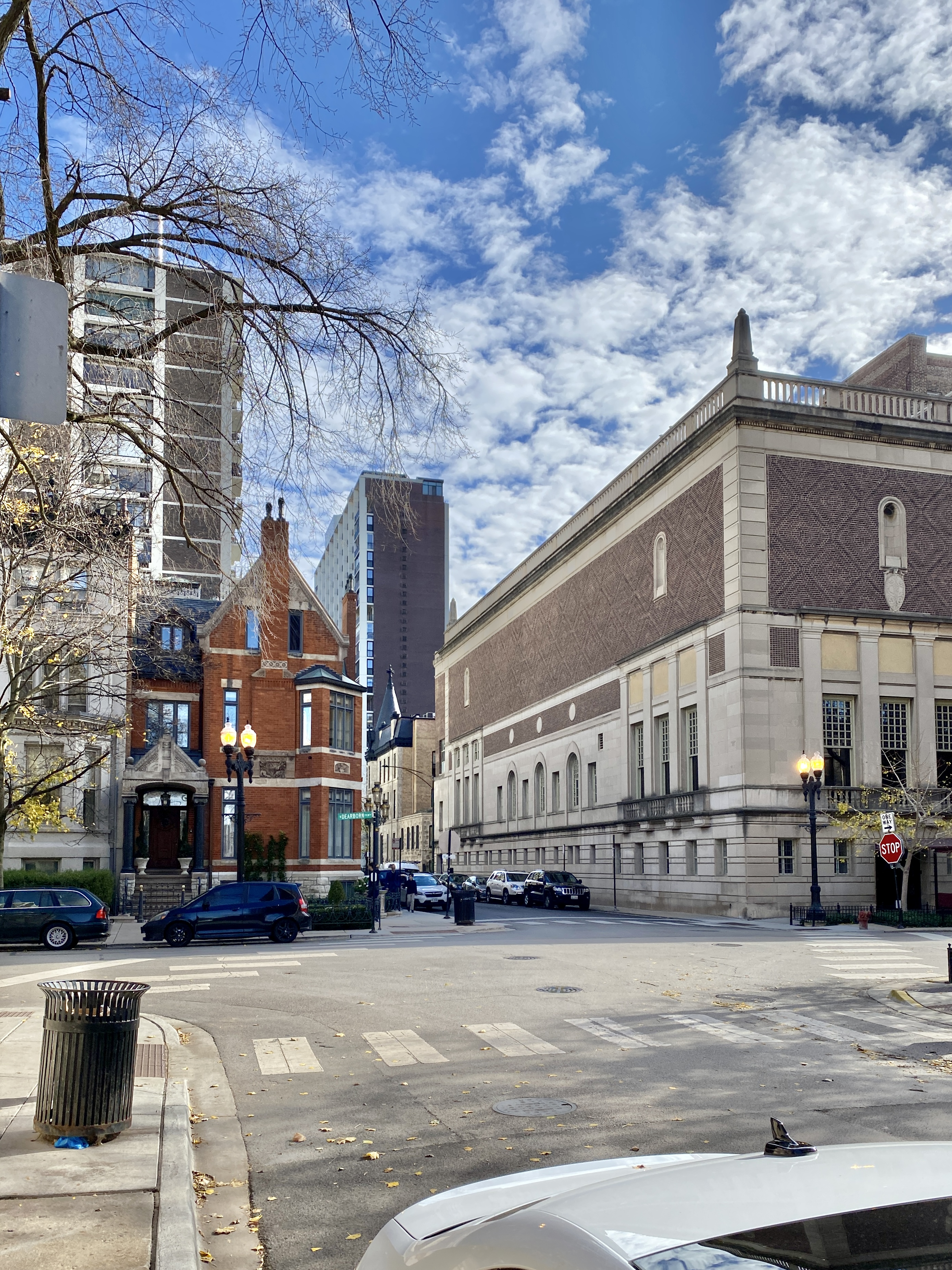
The clubhouse at Dearborn Parkway and Schiller Street

The city classifies the clubhouse as a Classical Revival building designed by Andrew Rebori. Its original plan combined social rooms—including dining, living, library and card rooms—with athletic spaces arranged around a central locker lounge. The building also contained 28 bedrooms and was designed for a membership of 500. It stands within the Gold Coast Historic District, which was listed on the National Register of Historic Places in 1978.

The club's athletic facilities include two rackets courts, two doubles squash courts, one international squash court and the restored court-tennis facility.

== Organization ==
The organization has held federal tax-exempt status since July 1941 and is classified as a 501(c)(7) social and recreational club. For the fiscal year ending in February 2025, it reported $6.79 million in revenue and $13.20 million in total assets.

== See also ==
- List of American gentlemen's clubs
