= Real tennis =

Racquet sport played in a walled court

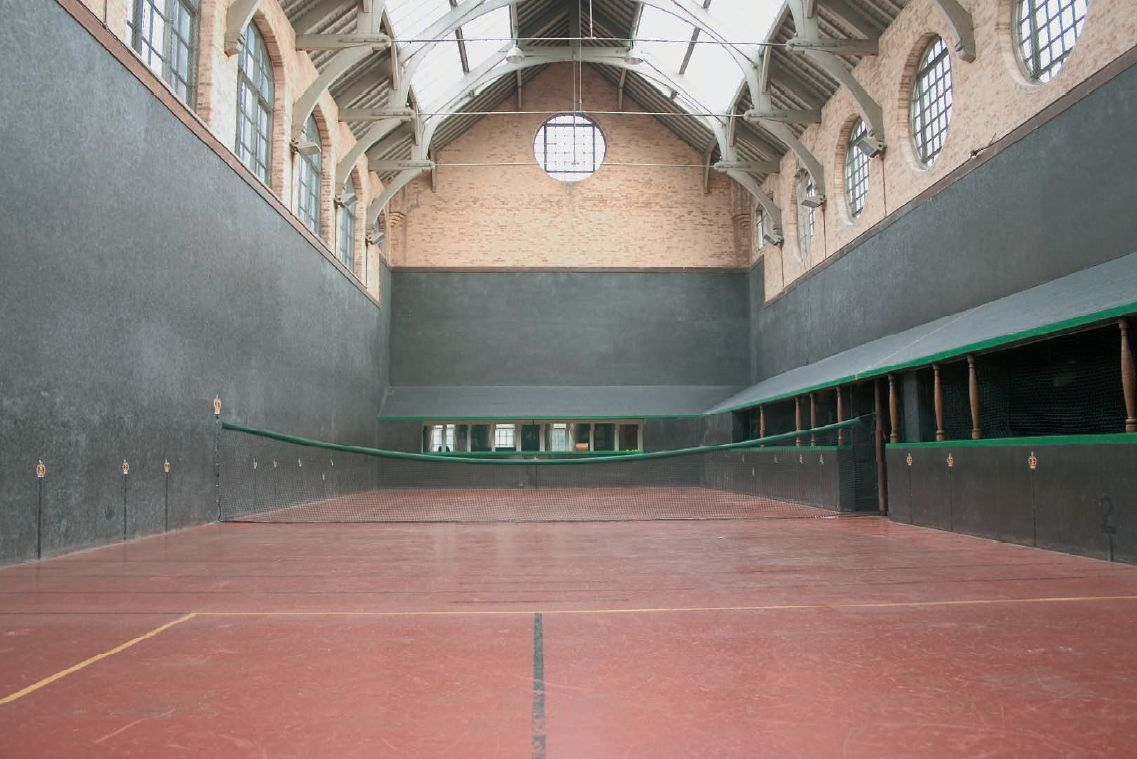
Jesmond Dene jeu à dedans court in Newcastle upon Tyne, England, view toward service end

Real tennis is a racquet sport from which the modern game of tennis (also called "lawn tennis") is derived. It is also known as court tennis in the United States, royal tennis in the United Kingdom and Australia, and courte-paume in France (to distinguish it from longue-paume, and in reference to the older, racquetless game of jeu de paume, the ancestor of modern handball and racquet games). Many French real tennis courts are at jeu de paume clubs.

The term real was first used by journalists in the early 20th century as a retronym to distinguish the ancient game from modern lawn tennis (even though, at present, the latter sport is seldom contested on lawns outside the few social-club-managed estates such as Wimbledon).

There are 45 active real tennis courts in the world, located in the United Kingdom, Australia, the United States and France. There are also six disused courts, such as the two in the Republic of Ireland. The sport is supported and governed by various organizations around the world.

== Equipment ==
=== Balls ===
Unlike latex-based technology underlying the modern lawn tennis ball, the game uses a cork-cored ball which is very close in design to the original balls used in the game. The 2 1/2-inch (64 mm) diameter balls are handmade and consist of a core made of cork with fabric tape tightly wound around it, compacted by outer windings of string, and covered with a hand-sewn layer of heavy, woven, woollen cloth, traditionally Melton cloth (not felt, which is unwoven and not strong enough to last as a ball covering). The balls were traditionally white, but around the end of the 20th century "optic yellow" was introduced for improved visibility, as had been done years earlier in lawn tennis. The balls are much less bouncy than lawn tennis balls, and weigh about 2 1/2 ounces (71 grams); lawn tennis balls typically weigh 2 ounces (57 g).

Despite trials by Dunlop to introduce machine-made balls in the 1970s, almost all balls are entirely hand made by club professionals. The inner core of a ball can last several years, but the cover must be replaced every two to three weeks, depending on usage. Balls are produced in sets of around 60 and hand-sewn by the professional at each club. They are not available for purchase by the general public. Balls are stored in a wicker or plastic basket placed in a hole in the floor underneath the net. A trough under the net allows balls hit into the net to roll into the basket. The entire basket of balls is tipped into a tray in the dedans prior to play to reduce time spent fetching balls; ball boys are not required in real tennis.

=== Rackets ===
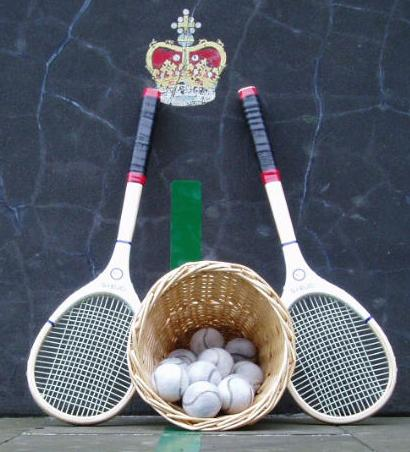
Racquets and white balls

The spellings racket and racquet are both used by different sources. The 27-inch (690 mm) short, asymmetrical racquets are made of wood and use very tight nylon strings to cope with the heavy balls. The racquet is oval-shaped to make it easier to strike balls close to the floor or in corners, and to facilitate a fast shot with a low trajectory that is difficult for an opponent to return. However, the rackets have a small sweet spot, which discourages a large swing in a shot and emphasises accuracy. Rackets are made of a combination of ash, hickory, vulcanized fibre and willow. Gut strings have now entirely been replaced by nylon, allowing strings to be tighter. Rackets are laminated, with improvements in epoxy resulting in stronger, sturdier rackets which last longer and have changed the game to be faster and more hard hitting.

Most of the rackets are produced by Grays of Cambridge, based in Cambridge in the United Kingdom. Companies that have previously produced real tennis rackets include Dunlop, Slazenger and Gold Leaf Athletics. The introduction of graphite rackets in lawn tennis has reduced the demand for wooden rackets of any sport, resulting in the larger companies leaving the industry. In the 2020s, Harrow Sports introduced graphite rackets which are not permitted by the rules of the game as of 2025, but are being trialled at the club level.

Due to the small nature of the game, rackets are almost exclusively sold by club professionals, who also provide restringing services to club members. Even at the elite level, professionals string their own rackets.

=== Courts ===
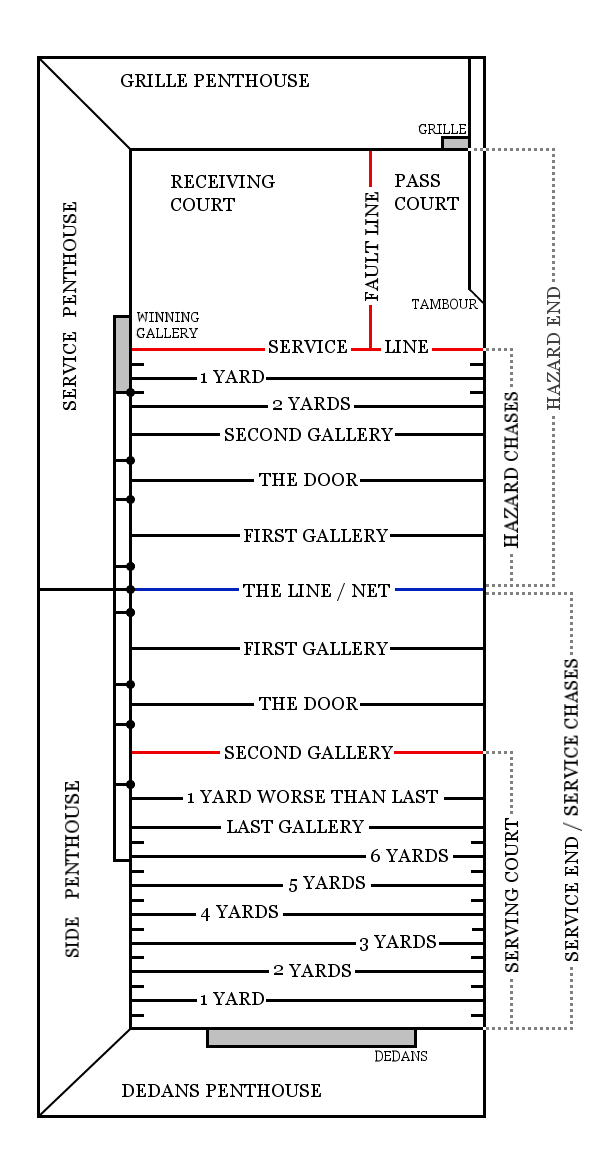
An example layout of a tennis court. A valid serve must occur from the serving court before the second gallery line, and hit the service penthouse before dropping in the receiving court, marked by the service line and fault line. Corresponding chase lines extend from the centres of the side galleries on both service and hazard ends, including the first, door, second and last. Gallery posts and the net post are marked with circles. Shaded areas are the winning openings, the dedans, grille, and winning gallery. None of these, nor the posts, would be visible with an actual overhead view as depicted.

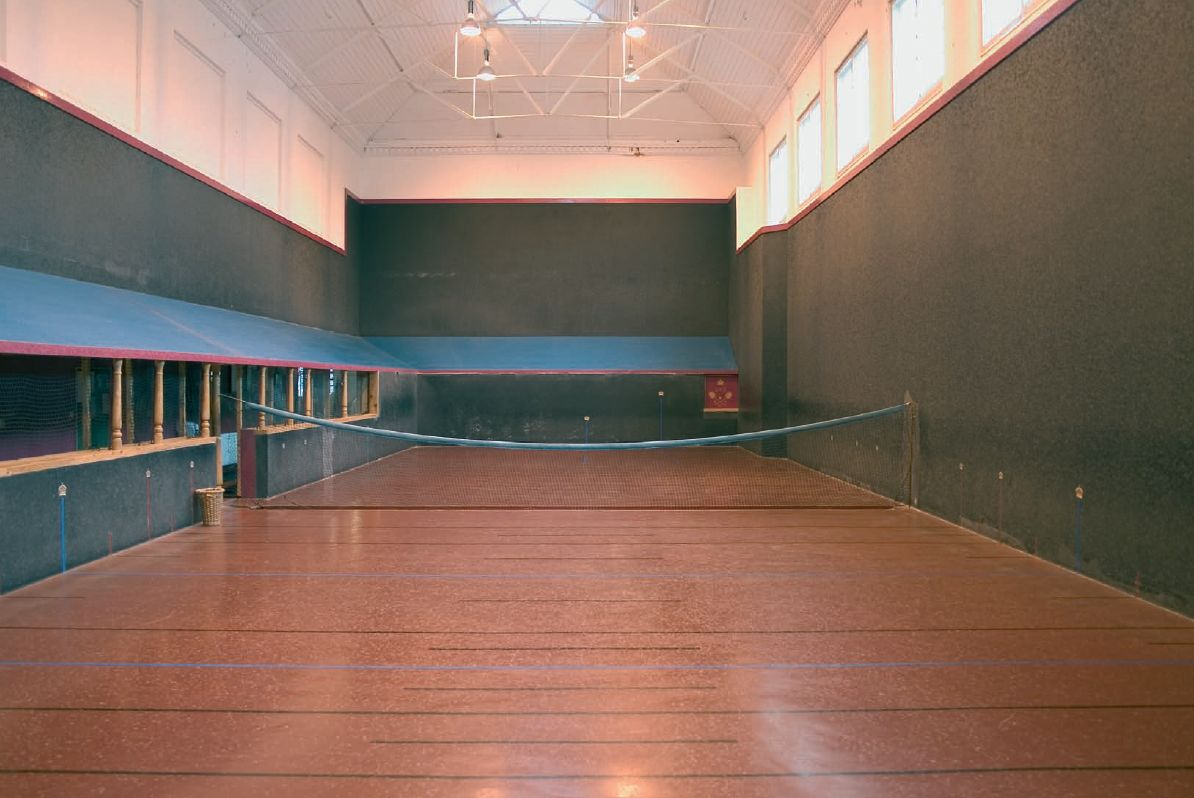
Newmarket-Suffolk jeu à dedans court, view toward hazard end

There are two basic designs in existence today: jeu quarré, which is an older design, and jeu à dedans. Both are doubly asymmetric: the two ends of the court differ in shape, as do the left and right sides. All existing tennis courts in the modern day are of the jeu à dedans variety, except the court at Falkland Palace in Scotland. The jeu à dedans court is a rectangular indoor court with high walls on all four sides and a high ceiling. The floor size of a court can vary from 28.3 by 9.1 metres (93 ft × 30 ft) at Oxford to 29.6 by 9.6 metres (97 ft × 31 ft), and can be constructed of dyed concrete or, in some older courts, flagstone. The surrounding walls are usually constructed of brick or cinder block and are plastered smooth. Some courts, notably Prested and previously Washington, have glass walls down to floor level, though many more have installed glass walls higher up to increase viewing capacity without impacting play.

Three walls feature sloping wooden roofs, known as penthouses, built 2 to 2.2 metres (6 ft 7 in to 7 ft 3 in) above the floor and extending to a width of 1.6 to 2.2 metres (5 ft 3 in to 7 ft 3 in). The wall without a penthouse is called the main wall. Protruding from the main wall is the tambour, an angled wall 0.7 to 1.0 metre (2 ft 4 in to 3 ft 3 in) wide at an angle of approximately 53 degrees, though some courts can be up to 59 degrees.

Counting clockwise from the main wall, the penthouses are called the dedans penthouse, the service penthouse and the grille penthouse. The side with the dedans penthouse is also known as the service end, and the side with the grille penthouse is also known as the hazard end. Beneath the penthouses are various openings in the wall, which have various mechanics in the gameplay and allow spectators to view the game. Underneath the dedans penthouse is the dedans, between 5.7 and 6.7 metres (19 and 22 ft) wide positioned centrally along the wall. A net across the opening allows spectators to view the game without fear of injury. Beneath the grille penthouse is the grille, a roughly square opening measuring between 0.9 by 0.9 metres (2 ft 11 in × 2 ft 11 in) and 1.0 by 1.0 metre (3 ft 3 in × 3 ft 3 in) positioned on the upper right hand side as viewed from the court. The grille is usually blocked by a solid wood cover with a picture or club logo, though American courts usually have netting instead. Beneath the service penthouse is a long opening, divided up into smaller openings by wooden or metal posts. The central such opening, known as the line, extends to the floor and allows players to enter the court and change ends. Counted from the centre of the court, the openings are known symmetrically as first gallery, the door, second gallery and last gallery, though at the end of the court closest to the grille penthouse the final opening is instead called the winning gallery and contains a bell which rings when a ball enters the opening.

Strung across the centre of the court is a net, which sags in the middle. At the centre of the court, the net is positioned 3 feet (0.91 m) above the playing surface, rising to 5 feet (1.5 m) at the sides of the court. Most courts have a trough and a sunken basket at the base of the net for collecting balls at the change of ends.

On the hazard side, the receiving court is marked by a line called the service line approximately 7 yards (6.4 m) from the back wall, and a line parallel to the main wall called the fault line. Often, the receiving court is painted a different colour to the rest of the floor. A series of lines called chase lines measure the distance from the back of the court on the service side and from the service line on the hazard side towards the net. Courts in the United Kingdom, United States and Australia mark the distance in intervals yards from the back wall. The lines are numbered on the side walls, up to 6 on the service side and 2 on the hazard side, with the seventh line corresponding to the last gallery and second gallery respectively. Subsequent lines correspond to the gallery openings up to first gallery. Often, the last gallery and second gallery lines on the service end are a different colour to the remainder of the lines to make them easier to identify. At Prested in Essex, the floor is painted in alternating green and blue colours in lieu of chase lines. In France, the lines are measured in pied du roi units, numbering up to 14 on the service side and 4 on the hazard side.

As many courts were built before the introduction of electric lighting, most courts have clerestory windows above the main and service walls. Typically, these areas are considered out of court, and are demarcated with an out of court line that extends around the top of the playing area. Often the out of court area is not plastered like the playing area. Notable exceptions include Hobart, where the wall between the windows is considered in play, and Hyde Bridport, where the two windows at the ends of the court are still in play. Alternatively, some courts have skylights in the roof of the building. All courts now use artificial lighting, allowing play at all times of day. Some modern courts, such as Radley and Oratory, do not have windows at all, and are lit entirely artificially. Most courts have gabled roofs, with the ridge line along the length of the court. Each court has local rules as to whether balls hit over the beams are in or out of play.

The court at Falkland Palace is the last remaining jeu quarré design which, unlike the jeu à dedans court, does not have a tambour, a dedans and a dedans penthouse. Instead, it has an ais, a piece of wood on what would be the dedans wall adjacent to the service penthouse, and four lunes, openings in the walls high above what would be the dedans. The court is the only existing, playable court in the world to not have a roof.

== Manner of play ==
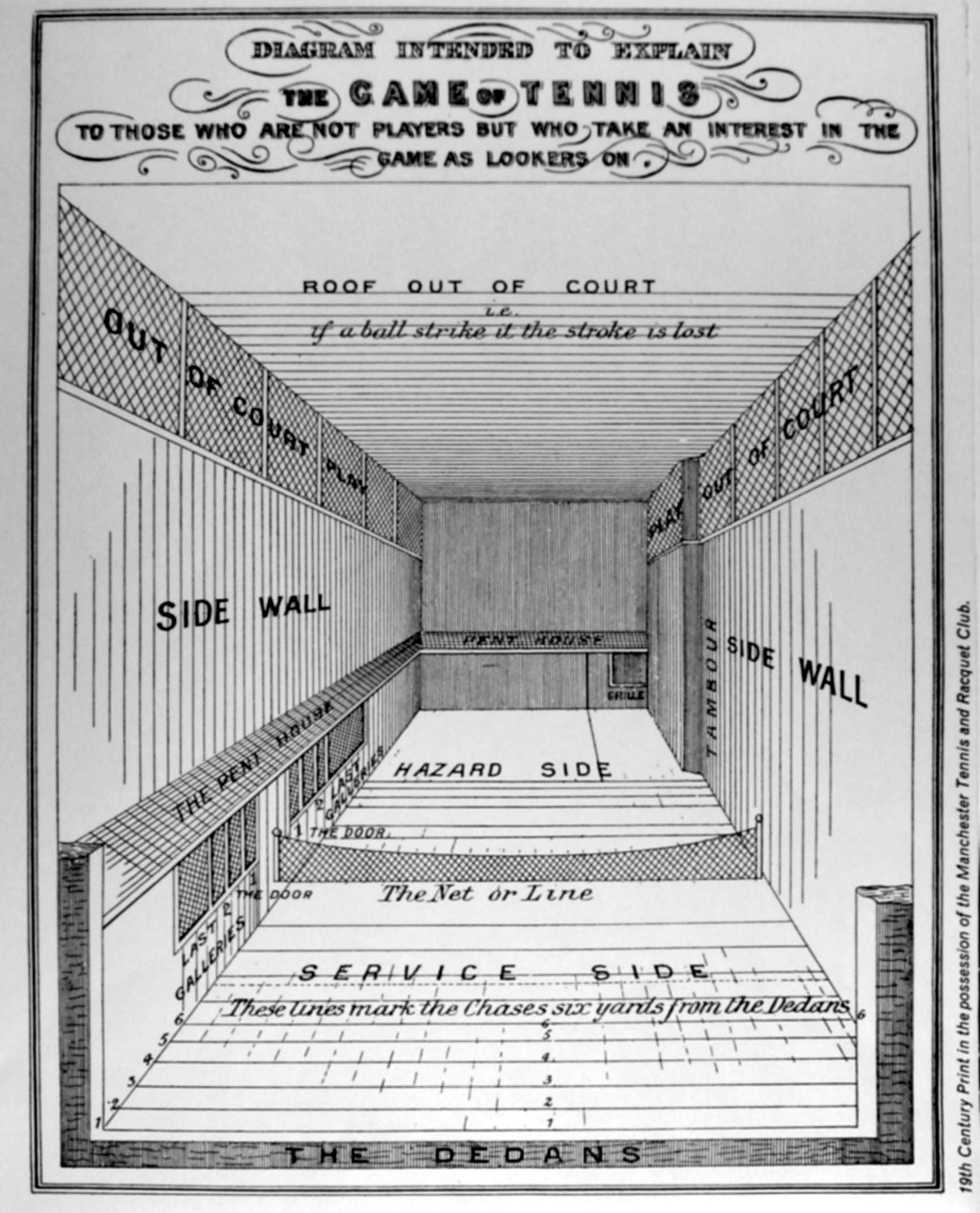
Description of a real tennis court, 19th century

=== Service ===
To begin play, the players traditionally spin a racket or toss a coin to decide who serves first. Serves are always made from the service end of the court, that is, the side of the net with spectator seating in the dedans behind it. Unlike lawn tennis, at least one foot must be grounded during the service, but the player may serve from anywhere in the court between the dedans wall and the second gallery line. The serve is played onto the service penthouse, and must touch the service penthouse at least once on the receiver's (hazard) side of the court. It may also touch the service wall above the penthouse or the service penthouse on the server's side. From there, it may touch any other surface except the main wall or tambour. Serves may be volleyed by the receiver, or be played off a single bounce on the floor. To be a valid serve, the ball must land in the rectangle marked by the service line and the fault line. Serves which land between the fault line and the main wall, below the service line, or which fail to touch the service penthouse are called fault. Players are permitted a second serve, but if it is also a fault, then the server double faults and the receiver wins the point. Under French rules, balls which land between the fault line and the main wall are not considered a fault, and are instead called a pass, with the serve replayed.

In doubles play, the two players in the pair alternate serving or receiving at the end of each game. The first player will serve or receive the entirety of the first game, with the second player serving or receiving the entirety of the second game and so on. This means that a player from one team will only serve or receive from one player from the other team for the entire set. The exception is if a serve lands between the half-court line (the line that is half-way between the main wall and the side wall) and the fault line, in which case either receiving player may elect to play the ball. At the start of each new set, the players may switch who is serving first and second. The pair at the service end must nominate the first server before the pair at the hazard end nominates the first receiver, so players will occasionally play tactically to ensure that they are at the hazard end at the end of each set to ensure they can choose the match-ups for the new set.

Because there are numerous surfaces for the ball to touch during a serve, there are many different styles of serves which are chosen to achieve different tactical advantages. Since the court is asymmetric, different techniques are required for right and left-handed players. Some of the most common serves include:

Railroad
Served from the back of the court close to the service wall, the railroad is played overhead with a fast right-to-left action. For right handed players, the stance is usually front-on with the service motion led by the elbow to impart side-spin on the ball, whereas for left handed players, the service is similar to a slice serve in lawn tennis. An ideal railroad will bounce no more than a few inches from the bottom of the penthouse, then kick off the floor back towards the galleries, forcing the receiver to play the wall close to the side penthouse and out of position up the court.
Bobble
Served from the centre of the court, often around last gallery, the bobble is played with no spin and hit softly at around hip height. It should bounce or roll several times on the service penthouse but not the service wall, forming an arc and falling close to the grille wall with as little forward momentum as possible. Often served as a second serve, it is often the first serve learnt by beginners.
Demi-piqué
Served from the centre of the court, near last gallery, the demi-piqué is played with left-to-right spin – for right handers it is played at head height while for left handers it is played below the waist. A demi-piqué strikes the service penthouse once near hazard first gallery, then the side wall, then may or may not hit the service penthouse a second time on the way down. The uncertainty of the trajectory on the way down makes it difficult to volley.
Underarm twist
Served mostly by right handers from the back of the court near the service wall, the underarm twist is played with right-to-left spin and played around knee height. For variation, it may or may not hit the service wall. It is typically much slower in pace than a railroad, despite having similar spin that kicks back towards the galleries. Left handers achieve a similar effect with a railroad, which is typically easier to learn than for right handers.
Side wall
Served from the back of the court near the side penthouse, the side wall serve is played with a left-to-right spin at around head height. It is hit directly onto the side wall above the net, then hitting the service penthouse on the way down. If allowed to hit the back wall, the serve will spin towards the grille, making it more difficult to hit to the right hander's forehand corner.
High serve/Chandelle
Served from the main wall at around last gallery, the high serve, also known as a chandelle, is hit as close to the roof as possible, falling once on the service penthouse and then close to the back wall. The serve can be played with either side spin or under spin, resulting in different variations when bouncing off the service penthouse.
High side wall
Similar to the high serve, the high side wall will hit the service wall before the service penthouse, resulting in the ball running along the grille wall. Difficult to return when served well, if served too long results in a fault (or pass in France), while if served too short is generally easy for the receiver.
Giraffe
Also similar to the high serve, except served from close to the service penthouse at about second gallery.
Drag
Served from very close to the service wall, the drag is played with heavy backspin. For right handers, this is typically achieved by serving as a backhand, while for left handers it can be served forehand. When served short, the backspin causes the ball to loose forward momentum, while when served long will spin off the back wall towards the tambour
Boomerang
Served from the centre of the court, the boomerang is played deep onto the service penthouse, before bouncing up to the grille penthouse, then the back wall, returning to the service penthouse and falling flush with the grille wall. When served well, it is impossible to return, so there is a gentlemen's agreement that the serve is not used in high level play.
Piqué
Served from near the main around the second gallery line, the piqué is played with an overhead action, hit hard directly at the service penthouse. The ball then flies high in the air and lands near the grille wall close to the fault line. It is often used to target a weaker receiver in doubles play.
Caterpillar
Served from near the second gallery line in the centre of the court, the serve is played with a side wall action for right-handers or a railroad action for left-handers. The ball is played deep into the service penthouse, then striking the service wall, the grille penthouse, the back wall before finally falling flush with the grille wall close to the fault line. Rarely seen in singles play, it is often used to target a weaker receiver in doubles play.
African hunting dog
Served from the back of the court near the service wall, the African hunting dog is played overhead with a left-to-right spin, similar to a slice serve in lawn tennis. It typically bounces several times on the service penthouse before spinning off the back wall towards the centre of the court. As it does not keep the ball close to any walls, it is generally easy for the receiver, and is often only seen by players with prior experience in lawn tennis, and not at all in high level play.

=== Returns ===
Once the ball has been served, the players have to return it to the opposite side by striking it with the racket. Unlike lawn tennis, the ball does not have to bounce off the floor before it can be returned. It can be played in any direction, as long as its trajectory would bring it to hit the floor on the opposing side first.

=== Chases ===
Because of the asymmetry of the court, play generally favours the player at the service end of the court. The presence of the tambour at the hazard end introduces uncertainty for the receiving player. Unlike lawn tennis, where players alternately serve and receive entire games, in real tennis players must win the right to serve. To do so, the receiver must lay a chase, though a server can also lose the right to serve by laying a hazard chase. There are four ways to lay a chase:

- The receiver hits a 'winner', that is, a shot which is not reached by the server. The chase is marked at the point the ball becomes dead, i.e., the second bounce on the floor, as measured from the back wall using the chase lines.
- The receiver hits the ball into the galleries on the service side of the net (last gallery, second gallery, the door, first gallery, or the line). The chase is marked by the line corresponding to the gallery the ball entered. Hitting a gallery post corresponds to entering the gallery closer to the net.
- The server hits the ball into any of the galleries on the hazard side of the net except the winning gallery (which would win the point). The server loses the right to serve and has laid a hazard chase, which is marked by the line corresponding to the gallery the ball entered.
- The server hits a ball not retrieved by the receiver but which becomes dead between the net and the service line. The server loses the right to serve and has laid a hazard chase, which is marked by the point the ball becomes dead as measured from the service line.

Laying a chase or hazard chase does not immediately score points nor trigger a change of ends. Instead, the length of the chase is recorded and play continues until either:

- The score reaches game point, or
- Two chases (including hazard chases) have been laid.

When the condition is met, the players change ends and resolve the chases in the order in which they were laid. To resolve a chase, the point is played with the additional condition that shots hit by the receiver must not become dead (i.e. second bounce or entering a gallery) further from the back wall than the point at which the chase had been set, in which case the receiver would lose the chase (and also the point). In the case of a hazard chase, any winner hit by the receiver wins the point, but any ball that becomes dead between the point where the chase was marked and the grille wall loses the point. Any shot which is equal to the length of the chase being played is called chase off – no change is made to the score but the chase is not replayed. The presence of chases encourages players to play the ball as deep into the court as possible, as short chases close to the back wall are heavily weighted towards the server, and discourages shots such as a smash or a drop shot.

=== Winning openings ===
There are three so-called winning openings that win the point automatically for the player on the opposite side of the net if the ball lands there. These are:

Dedans
The largest of the three openings, and the only one at the service end. Players aiming for the dedans typically hit the ball hard and flat with slight top-spin, a shot known as a force. Forces may be hit either directly down the court or off the main wall, the latter being a boasted force. Such shots typically result in the serving player deploying a defensive volley from the back of the court. At lower standards of play, players may also attempt to hit the dedans using a lob shot, either directly into the dedans or after bouncing once on the floor. Shots hit too high go onto the dedans penthouse, and are usually an easy ball for the server to play.
Grille
The smallest of the three openings, positioned next to the tambour. Because balls struck towards the grille threaten to hit either the tambour or the grille, the receiving player must use their judgement as to which shot to defend. In doubles play, each player covers one of the two features.
Winning gallery
Positioned mirroring the last gallery but on the hazard side, the winning gallery can be identified by the presence of a bell in the netting of the gallery that rings when the gallery is struck. Although the gallery is rarely defended, it is difficult to hit, as inaccurate shots could go into hazard second gallery (thereby conceding a hazard chase and losing the right to serve) or go up onto the penthouse (creating an easy shot for the Hazard Side players to take advantage of).

=== Play ===
The heavy, solid balls take a great deal of spin, which often causes them to rebound from the walls at unexpected angles. For the sake of a good chase (close to the back wall), it is desirable to use a cutting stroke, which imparts backspin to the ball, causing it to come sharply down after hitting the back wall. Players at the hazard end will generally try to hit the ball as deep into the court as possible to lay difficult chases and recover the serve. Players at the service end will use the uncertainty caused by the tambour to deceive their opponents. Different serves and strategies are deployed to prevent players hitting chases, galleries or openings, particularly when playing off chases. Moreover, because of the weight of the balls, the small racquets, and the need to defend the rear of the court, many lawn tennis strategies, such as playing with topspin, and serve-and-volley tactics, are ineffective, except in doubles play.

Play must be continuous, so at the conclusion of one point, the server immediately collects a new ball and moves into position to serve the next point. Time wasting is generally not observed. Players may generally take a short break at the change of ends for refreshments, but may not leave the court except with the permission of the marker (and usually at the end of the set). The general etiquette is that the player changing from the service end to the hazard end will wait for the other player to come around the net, and place a ball on their racket for them to serve.

=== Marker ===
The score of the match is kept by a marker. The role of the marker is to mark the position of chases, call service faults, record the score and manage the conduct of the players. Traditionally, the marker stands at the net opening to get a view of the whole court. However, from this position the marker cannot see the service penthouse, so must rely on the sound of the ball or an assistant marker to call service faults. For safety reasons, most clubs and tournaments have moved the marker to a seat in the dedans. In this case, the players call the length of any hazard chases, unless an assistant marker is employed in the grille. As the game is small, most professionals are also trained markers, hence it is not uncommon to see players in a tournament marking other matches in the same draw, even at the elite level.

=== Scoring ===
==== Game ====
The scoring system of real tennis mirrors that of lawn tennis, which inherited the system from real tennis. A game is won by the first player to have won a total of four points, and to be at least two points more than their opponent. The points are called "love", "15", "30" and "40" respectively. If both players have reached 40 in the game, the score is called deuce. After a game has reached deuce, the player with one more point than their opponent has advantage. The score is typically called advantage server or advantage receiver as appropriate. Unlike lawn tennis, where the first score called corresponds to the server, in real tennis the first score called corresponds to the player who has won the most recent point. As chases are resolved at or before game point, no chases carry through to subsequent games.

In handicap matches, players may require different numbers of points to win a game. A player with receiving odds starts a game requiring less than four points to win the game, while a player with owing odds requires more than four points to win the game. Such odds are counted backwards, so a player requiring five points starts at "owe 15", while a player requiring six points starts at "owe 30". A player with half-odds starts each second game with the nominated score, that is, a player playing "owe half 15" starts the first game at love, and the second game at owe 15. In handicap matches, deuces are never played – a score of 40-all is winner-takes-all.

==== Set ====
A set is a series of games counted up to a predetermined number, usually 6. The sets are counted in the ordinary manner (i.e. 1, 2, 3 etc.). There are no tiebreakers or advantage sets played, so at a score of 5-all, the player who wins the next game wins the set. Because the service is decided by the chase rule, rather than alternating between the players, there is little residual advantage from serving first by the time the set is nearly over.

Depending on the tournament, the number of games required to win a set can be varied by the tournament organisers. Eight is a popular choice, also known as a pro set, though variations include sets to any number between five and ten. Some tournaments permit an unlimited number of games in the set, with the match only concluding if a timer has expired. If the match is to be played across more than one set, the set is only ever to six games.

==== Match ====
A match is a sequence of sets. A match is determined through a best of n sets system. In tournaments with a round robin stage (often as the qualification to a knock-out stage) matches are usually played to one set. Minor tournaments, Ladies Open tournaments and Ladies World Championships are played as best of three sets. Major tournaments, leading amateur tournaments, Open tournaments and matches up to the semi-finals of the Doubles World Championships are played as best of five sets. Matches in the first round of the Singles World Championships are played as best of nine sets, played across two days with four or five sets on the first day, and from zero to four sets on the second day. The Singles World Championships Final Eliminator and Final Challenge are played as best of thirteen sets, played across three days, with rest days in between.

== History ==
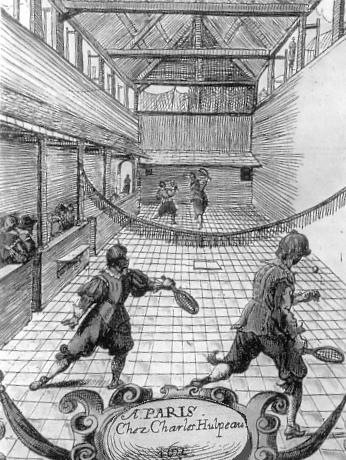
Jeu de paume, Paris

The term "tennis" is thought to derive from the French word tenez, which means "take heed" – a warning from the server to the receiver. Real tennis evolved, over three centuries, from an earlier ball game played around the 12th century in France. This had some similarities to palla, fives, Spanish pelota or handball, in that it involved hitting a ball with a bare hand and later with a glove. This game may have been played by monks in monastery cloisters, but the construction and appearance of courts more resemble medieval courtyards and streets than religious buildings. By the 16th century, the glove had become a racquet, the game had moved to an enclosed playing area, and the rules had stabilized. Real tennis spread across Europe, with the Papal Legate reporting in 1596 that there were 250 courts in Paris alone, near the peak of its popularity in France.

Royal interest in England began with Henry V (reigned 1413–1422) but it was Henry VIII (reigned 1509–1547) who made the biggest impact as a young monarch, playing the game with gusto at Hampton Court on a court he had built in 1530 and on several other courts in his palaces. His second wife Anne Boleyn was watching a game of real tennis when she was arrested, and it is believed that Henry was playing tennis when news was brought to him of her execution. James V of Scotland built a court at Falkland Palace in the 1530s, still in use today. Queen Elizabeth I was a keen spectator of the game. During the reign of James VI and I (1603–1625), there were 14 courts in London. According to Samuel Pepys, the four best players in England were Captain Thomas Cooke, the Master of Whitehall Tennis Court; Baptist May, Keeper of the Privy Purse; Thomas Chicheley, Master-General of the Ordnance and Prince Rupert of the Rhine, Duke of Cumberland.

In France, François I (1515–1547) was an enthusiastic player and promoter of real tennis, building courts and encouraging play among both courtiers and commoners. His successor, Henry II (1547–1559), was also an excellent player and continued the royal French tradition. The first known book about tennis, Trattato del Giuoco della Palla was written during his reign, in 1555, by an Italian priest, Antonio Scaino da Salo. Two French kings supposedly died from tennis-related episodes – Louis X of a severe chill after playing and Charles VIII after striking his head on the lintel of a door leading to the court in the royal Château at Amboise. King Charles IX granted a constitution to the Corporation of Tennis Professionals in 1571, creating a career for the 'maître paumiers' and, establishing three levels of professionals – apprentice, associate, and master. The first codification of the rules of real tennis was written by a professional named Forbet and published in 1599.

The game thrived among the 17th-century nobility in France, Spain, Italy, the Netherlands, and the Habsburg Empire, but suffered under English Puritanism, as it was heavily associated with gambling. By the Age of Napoleon, the royal families of Europe were besieged and real tennis, a court game, was largely abandoned. Real tennis played a role in the history of the French Revolution, through the Tennis Court Oath, a pledge signed by French deputies in a real tennis court, which formed a decisive early step in starting the revolution.

An epitaph in St Michael's Church, Coventry, written circa 1705 read, in part:

Here lyes an old toss'd Tennis Ball:
Was racketted, from spring to fall,
With so much heat and so much hast,
Time's arm for shame grew tyred at last.

During the 18th century and early 19th century, as real tennis declined, two new racquet sports emerged in England: rackets and squash racquets.

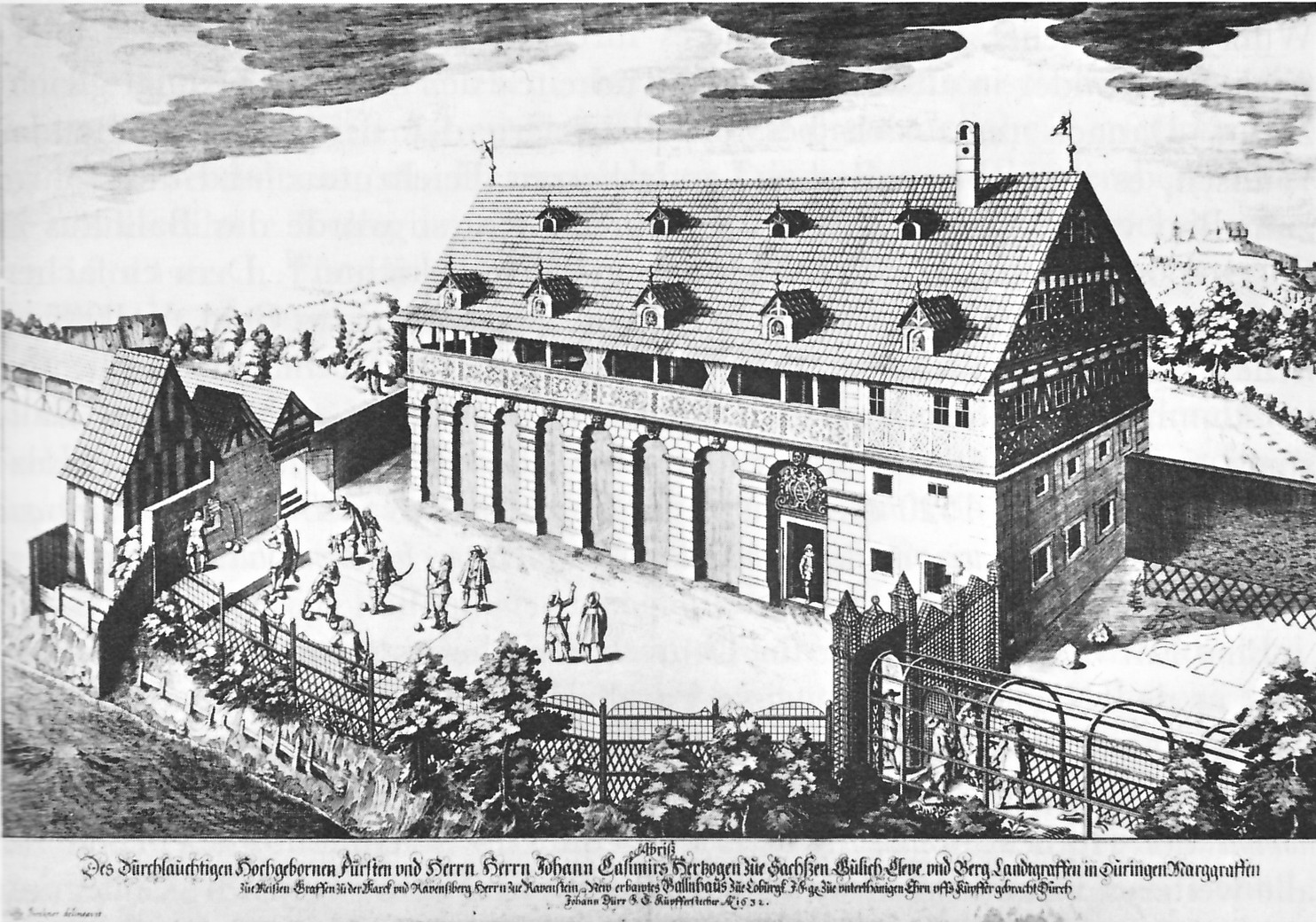
Real tennis house at Coburg, Germany

There is documented history of courts existing in the German states from the 17th century, though none exist today.

In Victorian England, real tennis had a revival, but broad public interest later shifted to the new and much less difficult outdoor game of lawn tennis, which soon became the more popular sport, and was also played by both genders (whereas real tennis players were almost exclusively male).

Real tennis courts were built in Hobart, Tasmania (1875) and in the United States, starting in 1876 in Boston, and in New York in 1890, and later at athletic clubs in several other cities. Real tennis greatly influenced the game of stické, which was invented in the 19th century and combined aspects of real tennis, lawn tennis and rackets.

Real tennis also has the longest running world championship of any sport in the world, dating from 1740.

=== Victorian court master-builder ===
A forgotten master of designing, building and restoring real tennis courts was the British Fulham-based builder, Joseph Bickley (1835–1923). He became a specialist around 1889 and patented a plaster mix to withstand condensation and dampness. Examples of his surviving work include: The Queen's Club, Lord's, Hampton Court Palace, Jesmond Dene, Newmarket, Moreton Hall, Warwickshire and Petworth House. There are also examples of his projects in Scotland and in the United States.

== Competitions ==
=== World Championships ===
The pinnacle of the sport is the biennial World Championship. The first champion is known only as Clergé, becoming the champion in approximately 1740. Scores for challenge formats are only known from 1862 onwards. In general the format for the match has been a best of 13 set format, held over three days of play. The event is held as a challenge format, whereby the incumbent champion awaits a suitable challenger in a manner similar to chess or boxing. Throughout the 19th and early 20th centuries, the incumbent champion dictated the terms, location and times of his challenge, which required any challengers to be backed by sponsors who provided a sufficient prize purse to fund a challenge. The most notable champion of this period was Pierre Etchebaster, who held the title for 24 years between 1928 and 1954, winning eight challenges.

In 1959, responsibility for running the world championship was handed to the national governing body of the incumbent champion. In 1980, rules for eligibility of challengers were defined as any winner of a national Open title. However, after incumbent champion Robert Fahey won two consecutive grand slams in 2000 and 2001, no suitable challengers were available, so the rules were changed to hand responsibility for the terms, timing and location of challengers to the International Real Tennis Professionals Association. Qualification to the World Championship eliminators is now via the World Race, where competitors accumulate points for their placings at eligible tournaments, with the top four players competing in a series of eliminators for the right to challenge for the championship. The most dominant player of this period has been Robert Fahey, who held the title for 26 years between 1994 and 2016 and again from 2018 to 2022, winning the title a record 13 times. The current World Champion is American Camden Riviere, who defended his title against John Lumley in 2023. The next challenge is expected to be held at the International Tennis Hall of Fame in Newport, Rhode Island in September 2025.

A World Doubles championship was first contested in 2001 at Middlesex University and has been held every second year since. The host venue rotates between the four tennis playing countries in the order United Kingdom-Australia-France-United States. Unlike the singles championship, the doubles championship is an Open knock-out format, initially restricted to the top 8 pairs based on world ranking, but restricted to the top 4 pairs since 2022. Matches are played as a best of 9 set format. The most successful players include 6-time champions Tim Chisholm, Robert Fahey and Steve Virgona. The incumbent champions are Tim Chisholm and Camden Riviere who won the 2024 World Championship in Chicago.

The Ladies World Championship was first held in Melbourne in 1985, being held every second year since. The host venue rotates between the four tennis playing countries in the order Australia-France-United Kingdom-United States. Both singles and doubles competitions are contested at the same event as an unrestricted Open knock-out draw. The most successful players include 6-time champion Penny Lumley and 7-time and incumbent champion Claire Fahey. The most recent championship was held at The Oratory School in 2023, with Fahey winning the singles, and Fahey and Tara Lumley winning the doubles.

=== National Opens ===
All four tennis-playing countries (Australia, France, United Kingdom and United States) host a National Open event each year, with categories for men's and women's singles and doubles. In the first half of the 20th century, it was uncommon for players to compete at Opens outside of their home country. After the National Opens became a pathway for challenging for the World Championship in 1980, international play has increased. Chris Ronaldson became the first player to win a grand slam in 1984, following the creation of the French Open in 1981. Robert Fahey holds the record for most Open titles won, having won 50 singles title including grand slams in 2000, 2001 and 2008. Camden Riviere became the third player to win a grand slam in 2017 and again in 2019.

Women's Open events began in 1978, with Opens contested in all four countries by 1990. Unlike the men's game which is mostly contested by professionals, the women's game remains predominantly amateur, exceptions being Claire Fahey, Kate Leeming and Lesley Ronaldson. Charlotte Cornwallis became the first woman to win a grand slam in 2006. Claire Fahey holds the record for most Open titles won, winning 42 titles including 6 grand slams in 2010, 2011, 2012, 2014, 2017 and 2019.

=== Other professional competitions ===
The world rankings are administered by the International Real Tennis Professionals Association, with ranking points based on the total prize fund at the tournament. National Opens receive a 1.5 times multiplier to their ranking points. Current tournaments with world ranking points include:

Event	Dates	National Open	Host country	Host clubs	Last event	Notes
Australian Open	January	Yes	Australia	Royal Melbourne Tennis Club; Hobart Real Tennis Club	2025	
US Open	February	Yes	United States	Racquet Club of Philadelphia; Tuxedo Club, New York; Tennis and Racquet Club, Boston; Racquet Club of Chicago	2025	Event rotates between clubs. Rotation previously included Racquet and Tennis Club, New York City
US Professional Singles	June	No	United States	International Tennis Hall of Fame, Newport, Rhode Island	2025	Also known as the Schochet Cup
Champions Trophy	July	No	United Kingdom	Royal Tennis Court, Hampton Court	2025	First contested 2017
French Open	September	Yes	France	Société Sportive du Jeu de Paume & de Racquets, Paris	2024	also previously held in Bordeaux
IRTPA Championships	October	No	United Kingdom	various	2019	Ad hoc rotation between clubs. Not contested since 2019
European Open	October	No	United Kingdom	Lord's Cricket Ground, London	2015	Not contested since 2015
British Open	November	Yes	United Kingdom	Queen's Club, London	2023	

In addition, a number of professional events are held each year which do not carry world ranking points, including the US National (only open to US based professionals), the Category A Open Championships (only open to handicaps 0–15), the Tasmanian Open, the Victorian Open, the Tambour Tour, the Jesmond Dene Cup, the Seacourt Silver Racquet (handicapped), the IRTPA National League and the USCTA National League.

There is currently no formalised structure for the women's events, with each Open championship being organised independently by the relevant national governing body.

=== International team competitions ===
The major international team competition is the Bathurst Cup, with teams of amateur players from each tennis playing country competing in singles and doubles. The first Bathust Cup was held in 1922 between Great Britain and France at Queen's, sponsored by Lilias, Countess Bathurst. The United States first participated in 1923, and Australia in 1969. The event is held every two years, rotating in the order United Kingdom-Australia-France-United States. The first women's Bathurst Cup was held in 2022 between Great Britain and a team representing the Rest of the World. In 2009, a series of bilateral team competitions began for players aged under 26 known as the Van Alen (GB vs USA), Morris Clothier (USA vs Australia) and George Limb Trophies (GB vs Australia). There are currently no international team competitions open to professionals.

=== Other competitions ===
For amateur players, each tennis playing country hosts an annual amateur championship, with other elite tournaments including the Tuxedo Gold Racquet and the MCC Gold Racquet. The largest mass participation real tennis events include:

- Boomerang Cup, a handicap team doubles event held every second year at the Royal Melbourne Tennis Club
- Tournoi Trois Tripot, a handicap team doubles event held at trinquete (Basque pelota courts) in the French Basque Country
- World Masters, singles, doubles and team competitions for age categories from 50 to 80+ years held every second year on annual rotation
- Leamington Open, singles and doubles handicapped competitions credited with the development of the modern handicap system

== Locations ==
There are 45 playable real tennis courts in the world, with 28 of these in Britain, and six further disused courts.

== In literature ==
Tennis is mentioned in literature from the 16th century onwards. It is frequently shown in emblem books, such as those of Guillaume de La Perrière from 1539. Erasmus lets two students practice Latin during a game of tennis with a racquet in 1522, although the playing ground is not mentioned. A 1581 translation of Ovid's Metamorphoses by Giovanni Andrea dell'Anguillara, printed in Venice in quarto form transforms the fatal discus game between Apollo and Hyacinth into a fatal game of real tennis, or "racchetta."

William Shakespeare mentions the game in Act I – Scene II of Henry V; the Dauphin, a French Prince, sends King Henry a gift of tennis-balls, out of jest, in response to Henry's claim to the French throne. King Henry replies to the French Ambassadors: "His present and your pains we thank you for: When we have matched our rackets to these balls, we will, in France, by God's grace, play a set [that] shall strike his father's crown into the hazard ... And tell the pleasant Prince this mock of his hath turn'd his balls to gun stones". Michael Drayton makes a similar reference to the event in his The bataille of Agincourt, published in 1627.

The Penguin book of Sick Verse includes a poem by William Lathum comparing life to a tennis court:

If in my weak conceit, (for selfe disport),
The world I sample to a Tennis-court,
Where fate and fortune daily meet to play,
I doe conceive, I doe not much misse-say.
All manner chance are Rackets, wherewithall
They bandie men, from wall to wall;
Some over Lyne, to honour and great place,
Some under Lyne, to infame and disgrace;
Some with a cutting stroke they nimbly sent
Into the hazard placed at the end; ...

The Scottish gothic novel The Private Memoirs and Confessions of a Justified Sinner by James Hogg (1824) describes a tennis match that degenerates into violence.

The detective story "Dead Nick" takes place in a tennis milieu. The title alludes to a shot that hits "the nick" (where the wall meets the floor), called "dead" because it then bounces very little and is frequently unreturnable.

Hazard Chase (1964), by Jeremy Potter, is a thriller-detective story featuring real tennis on the court at Hampton Court Palace. During the story the game is explained, and the book contains a diagram of a real tennis court. Jeremy Potter wrote historical works (including Tennis and Oxford (1994)), and was himself an accomplished player of the game, winning the World Amateur Over-60s Championship in 1986.

The First Beautiful Game: Stories of Obsession in Real Tennis (2006) by top amateur player Roman Krznaric contains a mixture of real tennis history, memoir and fiction, which focuses on what can be learned from real tennis about the art of living.

The Corpse on the Court (2013) is a mystery by Simon Brett. It features the recurring lead character of Jude learning many details about the sport from aficionados.

In The Chase by Ivor P. Cooper, in Ring of Fire II in the 1632 series, up-timers Heather Mason and Judy Wendell learn the sport from Thomas Hobbes. Gustavus Adolphus of Sweden is depicted as an aficionado of the game.

Sudden Death (2013), a novel by Alvaro Enrigue, is interstitched throughout with descriptions of a real tennis match between the Italian artist Caravaggio and the Spanish poet Quevedo. The details of play are interspersed amongst historical reflections on the game, descriptions of techniques for making the balls, quotations from contemporary sources, gambling that accompanied the game, the backgrounds of the participants and the strategy discussions between the players and their seconds. It is intentionally unclear which details are real and which are imagined by the author.

== In film and television ==
Real tennis is featured in the film The Seven-Per-Cent Solution, a fictional meeting between Sherlock Holmes and Sigmund Freud. One of the film's plot points turns on Freud playing a grudge match with a Prussian nobleman (in lieu of a duel).

The film The French Lieutenant's Woman includes a sequence featuring a few points being played. Also The Three Musketeers (1973) and Ever After briefly feature the game. Although presented with varying degrees of accuracy, these films provide a chance to see the game played, which otherwise may be difficult to observe personally.

The Showtime series The Tudors (2007) portrays Henry VIII playing the game. The film The Man Who Knew Infinity features a short sequence of G. H. Hardy (Jeremy Irons) and John Edensor Littlewood (Toby Jones) playing real tennis.

== Televised or streamed matches ==
Real tennis has occasionally been televised, but the court (which does not well lend itself to the placement of cameras), the speed at which the ball travels, and the complexity of the rules all militate against the effectiveness and popularity of televised programming. Almost all top national and international tournaments can be seen live or on replay via YouTube channels.

== Notable players ==
=== Men ===
- Chris Chapman, three-time Open singles winner
- Joshua Crane, American champion 1901–1905; career coincided with that of Jay Gould
- Prince Edward, Duke of Edinburgh, notably played on 50 courts around the world in 2018 to support the Duke of Edinburgh's Award
- Pierre Etchebaster, World Champion, 1928–1953, d. 24 March 1980
- Robert Fahey, World Champion, 1994–2016, 2018. Fahey successfully defended his world championship title more times (11) than any previous champion. In April 2018 he regained the title, defeating Camden Riviere 7 sets to 5.
- Jay Gould II, American champion from 1906 to 1926, one of the longest streaks in the history of sport. From 1907 to 1925, he lost only one singles match, to English champion E. M. Baerlein. During that period, he never lost even a set to an amateur.
- G. H. Hardy
- John Moyer Heathcote
- King Henry VIII of England
- Nick Howell, French Open winner
- King John III of Sweden
- Northrup R. Knox, multiple-time American champion; retired undefeated
- George Lambert
- King Louis X of France
- John Lumley, World Championship Challenger 2023, 3-time Open winner
- Hon. Alfred Lyttelton
- Julian Marshall
- Alastair Martin (1915–2010), won the US Amateur Court Tennis singles title eight times (1941, 1950–1956 inclusive) and the doubles title 13 times (1948–1951, 1953, 1954, 1956, 1957, 1960, 1962, 1966, 1970, 1971)
- Eustace Miles, first foreign winner of the American championship in 1900. Unusually for the period, Miles was a vegetarian, and produced a book on dietetics entitled Muscle, Brain and Diet.
- Tom Pettitt
- Camden Riviere, 2016, 2022–present World Champion
- Chris Ronaldson, World Champion, 1981–1987
- Matthieu Sarlangue, current French Amateur Champion (Raquette d'Or)
- Robert Shenkman, current British and US Amateur Champion
- Leon Smart, World Number 8
- Richard D. Sears, first American amateur champion of court tennis in 1892, and apparent inventor of the overhead "railroad service," currently the most popular serve in the game
- Ben Taylor-Matthews, multiple Open Doubles winner
- Fred Tompkins, head professional of the Philadelphia court. When the New York Racquet and Tennis club opened, Tompkins was invited to be head professional. However, when he went to his brother Alfred to borrow money for his passage, Alfred decided to go in Fred's place; Fred later took over the Philadelphia court instead.

=== Women ===
- Saskia Bollerman, Dutch Women's Champion and two-time Open singles winner
- Charlotte Cornwallis, four-time Women's World Champion and four-time Women's Doubles World Champion
- Sally Jones, two-time Women's World Champion and Women's doubles World Champion
- Penny Fellows Lumley, multiple singles and doubles Women's World champion, multiple time winner at British, US, French and Australian Open, Grand Slam 1996–97, current Ladies Masters Champion
- Tara Lumley, current Women's doubles world champion (with Claire Vigrass Fahey), daughter of Penny
- Margot of Hainault, 15th-century female player, noted as one of the best players of her era
- Lea van der Zwalmen, current Women's World Ranking number 2
- Sarah Vigrass, two-time World Doubles Champion (with her sister, Claire)
- Claire Vigrass Fahey, current Women's World Champion

== See also ==
- List of real tennis world champions
- Grand Slam (real tennis)
- History of tennis
