= Racquet Club of Philadelphia =

Athletic club in Philadelphia, Pennsylvania

- Type: Social club
- Tax ID no.: 23-0998230
- Headquarters: 219 S. 16th Street
- Website: www.rcop.com
- Philadelphia Racquet Club
- U.S. National Register of Historic Places
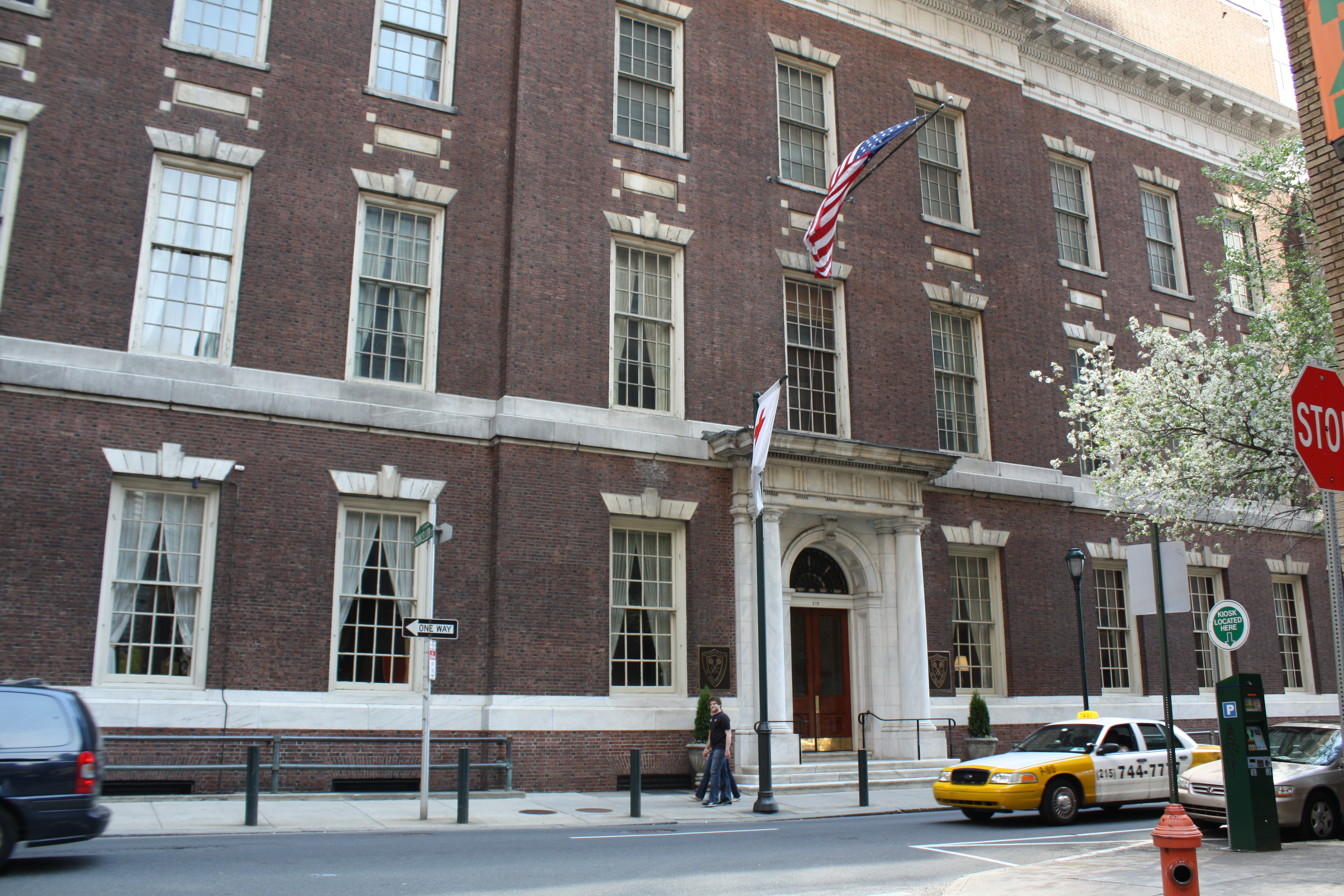
- The Racquet Club of Philadelphia in 2010

- Location within Philadelphia Location within Pennsylvania Location within the United States
- Coordinates: 39°56′55.9″N 75°10′4.74″W
- Built: 1906
- Architect: Horace Trumbauer
- Architectural style: Colonial Revival
- NRHP reference No.: 79002326
- Added to NRHP: August 1, 1979

The Racquet Club of Philadelphia (RCOP) is a private social club and athletic club in Philadelphia, Pennsylvania. It has facilities for squash, real tennis, and racquets. The club was ranked in the Top 20 Athletic Clubs on the Platinum Club of America list in 2016.

== Operations ==
The Racquet Club operates under laws for 501(c)(7) Social and Recreation Clubs; in 2025 it claimed total revenue of $4,242,249 and total assets of $7,868,094. The separate Historic Preservation & Education Fund of the Racquet Club of Philadelphia is a 501(c)(3) Public Charity since 2015. In 2023 it claimed total revenue of $166,556 and total assets of $210,960.

== History ==
Established in 1889, the Club started its life in a facility at 923 Walnut Street. Under the leadership of George D. Widener, the current 16th Street Clubhouse was built by architect Horace Trumbauer. Historian Nathaniel Burt described the new 1907 Clubhouse as "by far the best appointed...of all Philadelphia clubs." The clubhouse is one of the first reinforced concrete structures designed in Philadelphia, and also includes the world's first above grade swimming pool, designed by the noted bridge builders Roebling Construction Company. The building's red-brick, Georgian design, is evocative of historic Philadelphia, and the Clubhouse was placed on the National Register of Historic Places in 1979.

The Club was the site of the invention of squash doubles by Frederick C. Tompkins. The new building had a space that was too large for a standard squash court but too small for further locker facilities and Tomkins recommended that it be used for squash doubles.

The RCOP's racquet sport facilities include 6 international squash singles courts, 1 squash doubles court, 1 court tennis court, and 1 racquets court. The Club also has overnight rooms along with a fitness center for the use of members and sponsored guests, as well as a bar and serves lunch daily. It is open to members 365 days a year and is located on 16th Street between Walnut and Locust in the heart of Philadelphia's Rittenhouse Square area.

The Club has hosted many international court tennis, racquets, and squash doubles tournaments and has produced notable U.S. national champions including Jay Gould, Jock Soutar, Stanley Pearson and Morris Clothier.

The U.S. Squash Hall of Fame was briefly at the Club until moving to Yale University.

== Champion Members ==
- Jock Soutar
- Jay Gould II
- Morris Clothier

== See also ==
- List of American gentlemen's clubs
