= Royal Melbourne Tennis Club =

Tennis organization in Melbourne, Victoria, Australia

- Armorial ensign of the RMTC
- Formation: 1882; 144 years ago
- Type: Private members' club
- Purpose: Sport
- Location: Sherwood Street Richmond, Melbourne
- Coordinates: 37°49′08″S 144°59′29″E
- President: Johnathon Buckley (as of 2025)
- Website: rmtc.com.au

The Royal Melbourne Tennis Club (RMTC) is one of only four real tennis clubs in Australia, and the site of one of fewer than fifty real tennis venues in the world. The RMTC is the second oldest in Australia and the largest. It is one of only five clubs in the world with more than one court (along with Queens Club in London, Prested Hall, Cambridge University Real Tennis Club and the Racquet and Tennis Club).

The RMTC is the home of the Australian Open, as well as the largest (in terms of player involvement) Real Tennis tournament in the world, the Boomerang Cup. Robert Fahey, who holds the record for most World Championship wins, was a professional at RMTC prior to his move to the UK.

== History ==
In 1882 Lord Normanby, the Governor of Victoria, opened the court of the Royal Melbourne Tennis Club at 343 Exhibition Street, Melbourne, just north of La Trobe St. This building originally consisted of a real tennis court and club rooms, but later included squash courts (said to have been Australia's first) and an indoor swimming pool.

The club's status was enhanced in 1897, when Queen Victoria granted a Royal Charter to the club enabling it to be known by its present title, The Royal Melbourne Tennis Club. Thomas Stone was appointed the first Professional and manager of the club and was in time succeeded by his son Woolner Stone. Thomas and then Woolner each made an immense contribution to the club over a period of many years.

As the City of Melbourne expanded, the costs of owning and maintaining the Exhibition Street building - prime city real estate - increased beyond the financial means of the club. In 1974, the club committee sold the site and established the present club premises in Sherwood Street, Richmond. Today, the former Exhibition Street site houses the Mantra Hotel.

The new courts and clubhouse were officially opened in 1975 by Lord Aberdare, President of the Tennis and Rackets Association, and the facilities now include two tennis courts, a squash court, a bar, a swimming pool, a gymnasium, a library/meeting room and dining room.
