= Rackets at the 1908 Summer Olympics – Men's doubles =

Rackets at the Olympics

Men's doubles rackets at the Games of the IV Olympiad
- Venue: Queen's Club
- Dates: April 30, 1908 (semifinal); May 1, 1908 (final)
- Competitors: 6 from 1 nation

Medalists
1st place, gold medalist(s)		John Jacob Astor; Vane Pennell	Great Britain
2nd place, silver medalist(s)		Cecil Browning; Edmund Bury	Great Britain
3rd place, bronze medalist(s)		Henry Leaf; Evan Noel	Great Britain

The men's doubles competition was one of two rackets events held as part of the Rackets at the 1908 Summer Olympics programme. Nations could enter up to six pairs (12 players), but only Great Britain entered or competed, with three pairs (six players).

== Results ==
Semifinals
John Jacob Astor and Vane Pennell (GBR)	4
Henry Leaf and Evan Noel (GBR)	2
Cecil Browning and Edmund Bury (GBR)
bye

Finals
John Jacob Astor and Vane Pennell (GBR)	4
Cecil Browning and Edmund Bury (GBR)	1
