= Edward Hyde (Cambridge cricketer) =

English cricketer (born 1997)

Edward Richard Bebbington Hyde (born 12 December 1997) is an English wicketkeeper batsman. He was born in Huntingdon and attended St John's College School in Cambridge and Tonbridge School. He was then awarded a Skinners' Company exhibition to Jesus College, Cambridge.

== Cricket ==
After playing at school and through the Cambridgeshire (Under-10 to Under-15) and Kent (Under-14 to Under-17) age-groups, he has played for Cambridge University Cricket Club, Cambridge MCCU and Cambridgeshire County Cricket Club.

In 2018, he played his first Minor Counties Championship match for Cambridgeshire against Suffolk at Saffron Walden.

He first played for Cambridge in the 2018 season, including in the 2018 Twenty20 match against Oxford University at the University Parks and in the one-day University Match at Lord's where he won his Cambridge Blue. He went on that year to play first-class cricket in the four-day University Match at the University Parks.

== Other sports ==
He won the 2017 and 2018 UK National Under 21 Rackets (sport) doubles championships with Ben Cawston and Rory Giddins respectively and went on to win the Under 24 doubles championship in 2019 with Ben Cawston. He was 2018 National Under 21 singles Real tennis champion in 2018 and won the National Under 24 doubles with Robert Shenkman in 2019. He won Cambridge Blues for both sports in 2018, 2019, 2020 and 2021 and for Rugby Fives in 2020 and 2021.

== See also ==
- List of Cambridge University Cricket Club players
- List of Cambridge UCCE & MCCU players
