= Edmund Bury =

British racquets player

Olympic medal record

Men's Rackets
Silver medal – second place	1908 London	Men's doubles

Edmond William Bury (4 November 1884 – 5 December 1915) was a British rackets player who competed in the 1908 Summer Olympics.

He won the silver medal in the men's doubles competition together with Cecil Browning. In the men's singles event he did not participate.

Bury was killed in action, aged 31, during the First World War, serving as a captain with the King's Royal Rifle Corps near Fleurbaix. He was buried in the Rue-Petillon Military Cemetery nearby.

== See also ==
- List of Olympians killed in World War I
