= Pennell =

Pennell may refer to:

== Persons ==
- Caroline Pennell (born 1995), American singer-songwriter
- Chris Pennell (born 1987), English rugby union player
- Eagle Pennell (1952–2002), American independent filmmaker
- Edward Pennell (1894–1974), Royal Flying Corps officer
- Elizabeth Robins Pennell (1855–1936), American writer
- Francis W. Pennell (1886–1952), American botanist
- Harry Pennell (1882–1916), Royal Navy Officer
- Henry Singleton Pennell (1874–1907), English recipient of the Victoria Cross
- Jacob Pennell (1778–1841), American shipwright
- Joseph Pennell (1857–1926), American artist and author
- Larry Pennell (1928–2013), American television and film actor
- Lawrence Pennell (1914–2008), Canadian lawyer and politician
- Maynard Pennell (1910–1994), American businessman
- Nicholas Pennell (1938–1995), English actor
- Rebecca Pennell (educator) (1821–1890), American educator
- Robert Franklin Pennell (1850–1905), American educator and classicist
- Russ Pennell (born 1960), American basketball coach
- Steven Brian Pennell (1957–1992), American serial killer
- Theodore Leighton Pennell (1867–1912), Christian missionary and doctor
- Vane Pennell (1876–1938), British rackets and real tennis player

== Others ==
- 20455 Pennell, main-belt asteroid
- Pennell Bank, bank on the continental shelf in the eastern Ross Sea
- Pennell Coast, coast of Antarctica between Cape Williams and Cape Adare
- Mount Pennell, mountain summit in Utah
