= Rackets World Championships =

Rackets competition

The Rackets World Championships is the rackets leading event organised by the Tennis and Rackets Association.

== Start Year ==
The singles world championship began on a challenge basis in 1820, with the doubles championship starting in 1990.

Due to safety concerns, women were banned from playing rackets until 2008: the women's singles championship began in 2015, with the women's doubles championship starting in 2019 (2020).

1. MS: 1820
2. MD: 1990
3. WS: 2015
4. WD: 2019

== World Singles Champions ==
Year	Venue/s	Winner	Runner-Up	Scores	Notes
1820		(England) Robert Mackay			Mackay resigned title 1825
1825		(England) Thomas Pittman			Pittman resigned title 1834
1834		(England) John Pittman			
1838	Belvedere Gardens	(England) John Lamb	(England) John Pittman	8-4 (games)	died while champion in 1840
1846	Birmingham; Bristol	(England) John Charles Mitchell	(England) J C M Young	5-0 (games)	
1860	Woolwich Club; Bristol Club	(England) Francis Erwood	(England) John Charles Mitchell	8-1 (games)	
1862	Woolwich Club; Prince's Club	(England) William Hart-Dyke	(England) Francis Erwood	8-3 (games)	Dyke resigned title 1863
1863		(England) Henry John Gray			Gray resigned title 1866
1866		(England) William Gray			died while champion in 1875
1876	Prince's Club; Rugby School	(England) Henry B Fairs		8-3 (games)	died while champion in 1878
1878		(England) Joseph Gray			
1887	Rugby School; Manchester Club	(England) Peter Latham	(England) Joseph Gray	7-15, 15-10, 15-9, 10-15, 9-15, 15-8, 8-15; 15-2, 15-4, 15-11, 15-9	
1888	Queen's Club; Charterhouse School	(England) Peter Latham	(England) Walter Gray	2-15, 15-12, 15-7 16-14, 15-6; 8-15, 15-4, 12-15, 15-9, 15-9, 12-15, 15-?	
1891	Prince's Club; Queen's Club	(England) Peter Latham	(United States) George Standing	15-6, 15-12, 15-9, 15-5; 15-11, 15-13, 15-10, 15-18, 15-4	
1897	Prince's Club; New York Club	(England) Peter Latham	(United States) George Standing	15-11, 15-13, 15-10, 15-18, 15-4; 4-3 (games)	
1902	Queen's Club; Prince's Club	(England) Peter Latham	(England) Gilbert Browne	16-13, 15-10, 15-0, 15-2; 15-11 9-15, 15-7, 15-4, 15-7	Latham resigned title in 1902
1903	Prince's Club; Queen's Club	(British Raj) Jamsetji Merwanji	(England) Gilbert Browne	15-11, 18-16, 13-16, 15-8, 15-4; 15-5, 11-15, 15-5, 15-6, 15-1	
1911	Queen's Club; Prince's Club	(England) Charles Williams	(British Raj) Jamsetji Merwanji	18-15, 15-2, 15-9, 15-8; 15-7, 12-13, 14-17 15-7, 15-4, 12-15 0-0	last game not played
1913	Queen's Club; Philadelphia Club	(United States) Jock Soutar	(England) Charles Williams	15-6, 12-13, 11-15, 10-15, 15-9, 6-15; 15-2, 15-8, 15-4, 15-3	
1922	Philadelphia Club; New York Club	(United States) Jock Soutar	(England) Charles Williams	18-15, 15-0, 6-15, 12-15, 17-15,12-15, 15-7; 4-0 (games)	
1927	Philadelphia Club; New York Club	(United States) Jock Soutar	(United States) William Standing	8-1 (games)	
1929	Philadelphia Club; New York Club	(England) Charles Williams	(United States) Jock Soutar	7-3 (games)	died while champion in 1935
1937	New York Club; Queen's Club	(England) David S Milford	(United States) Norbert Setzler	15-9, 9-15, 15-10, 10-15, 8-15, 15-12, 12-15; 15-4, 15-4, 15-9, 15-12,	Milford resigned title 1946
1947	Montreal Racket Club; Queen's Club	(England) James Dear	(Canada) Kenneth Chantler	15-9, 16-17, 15-10, 15-11, 15-11; 15-4, 15-2, 15-8, 15-5	
1948	Queen's Club; Queen's Club	(England) James Dear	(England) John Pawle	8-4 (games)	
1951	Queen's Club; Queen's Club	(England) James Dear	(England) John Pawle	8-2 (games)	
1954	Queen's Club; Queen's Club	(England) Geoffrey Atkins	(England) James Dear	6-5 (games)	
1963	Queen's Club; Queen's Club	(England) Geoffrey Atkins	(England) James Leonard	6-1 (games)	
1964	Queen's Club; Queen's Club	(England) Geoffrey Atkins	(England) Charles Swallow	7-5 (games)	
1967	Chicago Club; Queen's Club	(England) Geoffrey Atkins	(England) James Leonard	7-2 (games)	
1970	Chicago Club; Queen's Club	(England) Geoffrey Atkins	(England) Charles Swallow	6-3 (games)	
1972	Queen's Club; Chicago Club	(United States) William Surtees	(England) Howard Angus	5-4 (games)	
1973	Chicago Club; Queen's Club	(England) Howard Angus	(United States) William Surtees	5-1 (games)	
1975	Chicago Club; Queen's Club	(United States) William Surtees	(England) Howard Angus	5-1 (games)	
1977	Chicago Club; Queen's Club	(United States) William Surtees	(England) Howard Angus	5-0 (games)	
1979	New York Club; Queen's Club	(United States) William Surtees	(England) Willie Boone	5-0 (games)	
1981	New York Club; Queen's Club	(England) John Prenn	(United States) William Surtees	6-4 (games)	
1984	Montreal Racket Club; Queen's Club	(England) Willie Boone	(England) John Prenn	7-2 (games)	
1986	New York Club; Queen's Club	(England) John Prenn	(England) Willie Boone	8-6 (games)	
1988	Chicago Club; Queen's Club	(England) James Male	(England) Willie Boone	6-1 (games)	
1991	Chicago Club; Queen's Club	(England) James Male	(United States) Shannon Hazell	6-2 (games)	
1993	Philadelphia Club; Queen's Club	(England) James Male	(England) Neil Smith	6-5 (games)	
1995	Chicago Club; Queen's Club	(England) James Male	(England) Neil Smith	6-2 (games)	
1999	Chicago Club; Queen's Club	(England) Neil Smith	(England) James Male	4-2 (games); 2nd leg scratched and Smith declared champion as Male was injured	
2001	New York Club; St Paul's School	(England) James Male	(England) Neil Smith	6-1 (games)	
2003	Philadelphia Club; Queen's Club	(England) James Male	(United States) Jonathan Larken	5-4 (games)	
2005	Montreal Racket Club; Queen's Club	(England) Harry Foster	(England) Alister Robinson	7-5 (games)	
2008	New York Club; Queen's Club	(Bermuda) James Stout	(England) Harry Foster	6-1 (games)	
2010	New York Club; Queen's Club	(Bermuda) James Stout	(England) Alex Titchener-Barrett	5-1 (games)	
2015	Philadelphia Club; Queen's Club	(Bermuda) James Stout	(England) Will Hopton	5-0 (games)	
2017	New York Club; Queen's Club	(Bermuda) James Stout	(England) Tom Billings	5-0 (games)	
2019	Queen's Club; Detroit Racquet Club	(England) Tom Billings	(England) Alex Duncliffe-Vines	5-0 (games)	
2023	Queen's Club; Racquet Club of Chicago	(England) Ben Cawston	(England) Tom Billings	5-0 (games)	

== Women Singles Champions ==
Year	Venue/s	Winner	Runner-Up	Scores
2015	London, England	(France) Lea van der Zwalmen	(England) Claire Fahey	3-1
2017	Crowthorne, England	(France) Lea van der Zwalmen	(England) Georgie Willis	3-0
2019	London, England	(France) Lea van der Zwalmen	(England) Georgie Willis	3-0
2022	London, England	(France) Lea van der Zwalmen	(England) Cesca Sweet	3-0
2024	London, England	(France) Lea van der Zwalmen	(England) Claire Fahey	8/15 13/18 16/13 15/5 18/13
2026	London, England	(England) Claire Fahey	(England) Cesca Sweet	15/12 18/13 15/0 15/4

== World Doubles Champions ==
Year	Venue/s	Winner	Runner-Up	Scores
1990	Manchester Club; Queen's Club	(England) James Male (England) John Prenn	(United States) Shannon Hazell (England) Neil Smith	8-5 (games)
1992	Clifton College; Queen's Club	(United States) Shannon Hazell (England) Neil Smith	(England) Willie Boon (England) John Prenn	7-3 (games)
1993	New York Club; Queen's Club	(United States) Shannon Hazell (England) Neil Smith	(England) James Male (England) John Prenn	7-7 (games); 166-160 points
1996	New York Club; Philadelphia Club	(United States) Shannon Hazell (England) Neil Smith	(England) James Male (England) John Prenn	5-0 (games)
1998	Clifton College; New York Club	(United States) Shannon Hazell (England) Neil Smith	(England) Willie Boon (England) Peter Brake	7-6 (games)
2001	Philadelphia Club; St Paul's School	(England) James Male (England) Mark Hue Williams	(United States) Shannon Hazell (England) Neil Smith	5-0 (games)
2003	New York Club; Queen's Club	(England) James Male (England) Mark Hue Williams	(England) Ali Robinson (England) Guy Barker	6-6 (games); 136-134 points
2005	Chicago Club; Queen's Club	(England) Ali Robinson (England) Guy Barker	(England) Tim Cockroft (England) Guy Smith-Bingham	7-4 (games)
2007	New York Club; Queen's Club	(England) Neil Smith (England) Mark Hubbard	(England) Harry Foster (England) Mark Hue Williams	5-0 (games)
2009	New York Club; Queen's Club	(England) Harry Foster (England) Mark Hue Williams	(England) Neil Smith (England) Mark Hubbard	7-5 (games)
2011	Montreal Club; Queen's Club	(England) Tim Cockroft (England) Alex Titchener-Barrett	(England) Harry Foster (England) Mark Hue Williams	8-5 (games)
2013	Chicago Club; Queen's Club	(England) James Coyne (England) Will Hopton	(England) Tim Cockroft (England) Alex Titchener-Barrett	6-2 (games)
2015	Chicago Club; Queen's Club	(England) Christian Portz (England) Alex Titchener-Barrett	(England) James Coyne (England) Will Hopton	7-2 (games)
2016	Queen's Club; New York Club	(Bermuda) James Stout (England) Jonathan Larken	(England) Christian Portz (England) Alex Titchener-Barrett	6-2 (games)
2018	Queen's Club; New York Club	(Bermuda) James Stout (England) Jonathan Larken	(England) Tom Billings (England) Richard Owen	5-0 (games)
2021	Queen's Club; New York Club	(England) Tom Billings (England) Richard Owen	(England) James Stout (England) Jonathan Larken	5-1 (games)
2023	Tennis and Racquet Club; Tennis and Racquet Club	(England) Tom Billings (England) Richard Owen	(England) Mike Bailey (England) Benjamin Cawston	6-5 (games)
2025	Queen's Club	(England) Tom Billings (England) Richard Owen	(England) Benjamin Cawston (England) Will Hopton	5-0 (games)

== Women's Doubles Champions ==
Year	Venue/s	Winner	Runner-Up	Scores
2020	Crowthorne, England	(England) Tara Lumley (England) India Deakin	(France) Lea van der Zwalmen (England) Louisa Gengler-Saint	3-1
2023	London, England	(France) Lea van der Zwalmen (England) Cesca Sweet	(England) Claire Fahey (England) Tara Lumley	3-0
2025	London, England	(France) Lea van der Zwalmen (England) Cesca Sweet	(England) Claire Fahey (England) Tara Lumley	3-1 (15-2 15-9 9-15 15-4)
