= Peter Latham =

Peter Latham may refer to:

- Peter Latham (tennis) (1865–1953), British racquets and real tennis player
- Peter Latham (cyclist) (born 1984), New Zealand racing cyclist
- Peter Latham (RAF officer) (1925–2016), British senior air force officer
- Peter Mere Latham (1789–1875), English physician and medical educator
- Peter Wallwork Latham (1832–1923), English physician and professor of medicine
