= Cecil Browning =

British racquets player

Personal information
- Nationality: British (English)
- Born: 29 January 1883 Hampstead, London, England
- Died: 23 March 1953 (aged 70) Westminster, London, England

Sport
Medal record
Men's Rackets
Olympic Games
Silver medal – second place	1908 London	Men's doubles
Men's squash
British Amateur Championships
Silver medal – second place	1923/1924	singles

Cecil Le Cronier Browning (January 29, 1883 – March 23, 1953) was a rackets and squash player from England who competed in the 1908 Summer Olympics.

== Biography ==
At the 1908 Olympic Games in London, Browning won the silver medal in the men's doubles rackets ompetition together with Edmund Bury. He also competed in the men's singles event but lost his first match.

Browning was excelled at squash and won the silver medal at the British Amateur Squash Championships during the 1923/24 season, losing to Tom Jameson 15–11, 16–14 in the final.
