= Evan Noel =

English rackets player

Olympic medal record

Men's Rackets
Gold medal – first place	1908 London	Men's singles
Bronze medal – third place	1908 London	Men's doubles

Evan Baillie Noel (23 January 1879 – 22 December 1928) was an English rackets player who competed in the 1908 Summer Olympics for Great Britain.

He won the gold medal in the men's singles event and the bronze medal in the men's doubles competition, where he played with Henry Leaf.

He also competed in the Olympic jeu de paume tournament but was eliminated in the quarter-finals.

Evan Noel was educated at Winchester and Trinity College, Cambridge. His daughter Susan Noel was a squash and tennis player.
