= Henry Symes-Thompson =

English cricketer and physician

Personal information
- Full name: Henry Edmund Symes-Thompson
- Born: 22 June 1873; Marylebone, Middlesex, England
- Died: 18 January 1952 (aged 78); Oxford, Oxfordshire, England
- Batting: Right-handed
- Relatives: Francis Symes-Thompson (brother); Arthur Page (brother-in-law)

Domestic team information
- Years: Team
- 1894–1895: Cambridge University
- 1896–1906: Marylebone Cricket Club

Career statistics
Competition	First-class
Matches	8
Runs scored	174
Batting average	11.60
100s/50s	–/–
Top score	31
Catches/stumpings	6/–
- Source: Cricinfo, 22 April 2021

Henry Edmund Symes-Thompson (22 June 1873 – 18 January 1952) was an English first-class cricketer and physician.

The son of Edmund Symes-Thompson, he was born at Marylebone in June 1873. He was educated at Winchester College, before going up to Christ's College, Cambridge. While studying at Cambridge University, he played first-class cricket for Cambridge University Cricket Club on four occasions in 1894 and 1895, though did not gain a blue. Besides playing first-class cricket for Cambridge University, Symes-Thompson also played for the Marylebone Cricket Club on four occasions between 1896 and 1906. He scored a total of 174 runs in eight first-class appearances, averaging 11.60 with a highest score of 31.

After gaining his medical degree from Cambridge, Symes-Thompson trained at St George's Hospital in London. He was a house surgeon and physician at Westminster Hospital and later a physician at the Royal Northern Hospital and the Royal Brompton Hospital. His final medical post was as a physician at St George's Hospital. His son, Richard, followed in his fathers footsteps and also became a physician. He was killed during the last major bombing raid on London in May 1941. Symes-Thompson died at Oxford in January 1952. His brother, Francis, also played first-class cricket, as did his brother-in-law Arthur Page.
