= James Stout (rackets) =

Personal information
- Nickname: Jamie
- Born: 16 August 1984 (age 41) Bermuda
- Website: www.james-stout.com

Sport
- Country: Bermuda
- Handedness: Rackets, Real Tennis, Squash, Squash Doubles
- Turned pro: 2003

James Stout, born 16 August 1984, is a world-ranked professional squash, rackets and real tennis player from Bermuda.

Stout was the World Champion of Rackets between 2008 - 2017, and is also ranked within the top ten in the world in Real Tennis and Squash Doubles.

He previously played professional squash on the Professional Squash Association (PSA) world tour, achieving a career high ranking of world #116 in 2004.

Alongside his pro athlete career, he has been a teaching professional at the New York Racquet and Tennis Club since 2006.

== Career ==
Stout began playing squash in Bermuda at the age of 4. At 13, Stout moved to England to attend boarding school at Cheltenham College, where alongside squash he also began playing the sport of rackets, coached by Mark Briers.

Stout’s early promise in rackets was shown when he won both the esteemed Foster Cup and the First Pairs Cup two years in succession, in 2000 and 2001.

In 2003, at the age of 19, he moved to Belgium to pursue his professional squash career, basing himself in the city of Antwerp and competing on the PSA tour internationally. The same year, Stout was part of the Bermuda National Team to compete at the World Team Squash Championships in Vienna, Austria.

In 2006 he represented Bermuda in squash at the Commonwealth Games in Melbourne Australia, and later that year at the Central American and Caribbean Games in Cartagena, Colombia. He moved to the United States in late 2006 after being offered a teaching professional position at the New York Racquet and Tennis Club. The same year he also won the US Professional singles rackets championship and the Western Open rackets championship. In 2007, Stout represented Bermuda at the Men’s World Open Squash Championships, and again won the rackets titles at the US Professional singles and Western Open.

He defeated former world champion Neil Smith 3-0 in the U.S. Open rackets final in January 2008, and the following month won the British Open rackets championship defeating Alex Titchener-Barrett 4-1. By virtue of those two victories he was granted the right to challenge then world champion Harry Foster. The World Championship match against Foster was held in late 2008; Stout defeated Foster by a score of 6-1 (4-1 in the first leg in New York, and 2-0 in the second leg in London) becoming the second youngest ever rackets World Champion at the age of 24.

In 2009, Stout was awarded Bermuda Male Athlete of the Year in the Bermuda Government Sports Awards, and again became the British Open rackets champion.

The following year, Alex Titchener-Barrett challenged Stout for the rackets World Championship title which Stout successfully defended, winning 4-0 in the first leg in New York, and 1-1 in the second leg at the Queens Club in London.

In 2010, Stout also became the US Open rackets champion and US Open real tennis champion, defeating several higher seeds, including the defending champion, to win the title.

Stout retired from competitive singles Rackets following the 2019 season and relinquished his world title. Stout continued to play competitive doubles and won the World Championship with Jonathon Larken in 2016 and again in 2018 before losing it to Tom Billings and Richard Owen in 2021. Recently Stout has played with new partner Peter Cipriano and they were the holders of the US open doubles where they defeated Benjamin Cawston and Mike Bailey 3-1 in New York, losing to the same pair in Detroit in 2023.

Stout began playing professional squash doubles on the Squash Doubles Association tour in 2012, and won the Graham Cup with his partner Greg McArthur and the William White tournament during the 2012-2013 season.
