= Pennellville Historic District =

Historic district in Maine, United States

- U.S. National Register of Historic Places
- U.S. Historic district
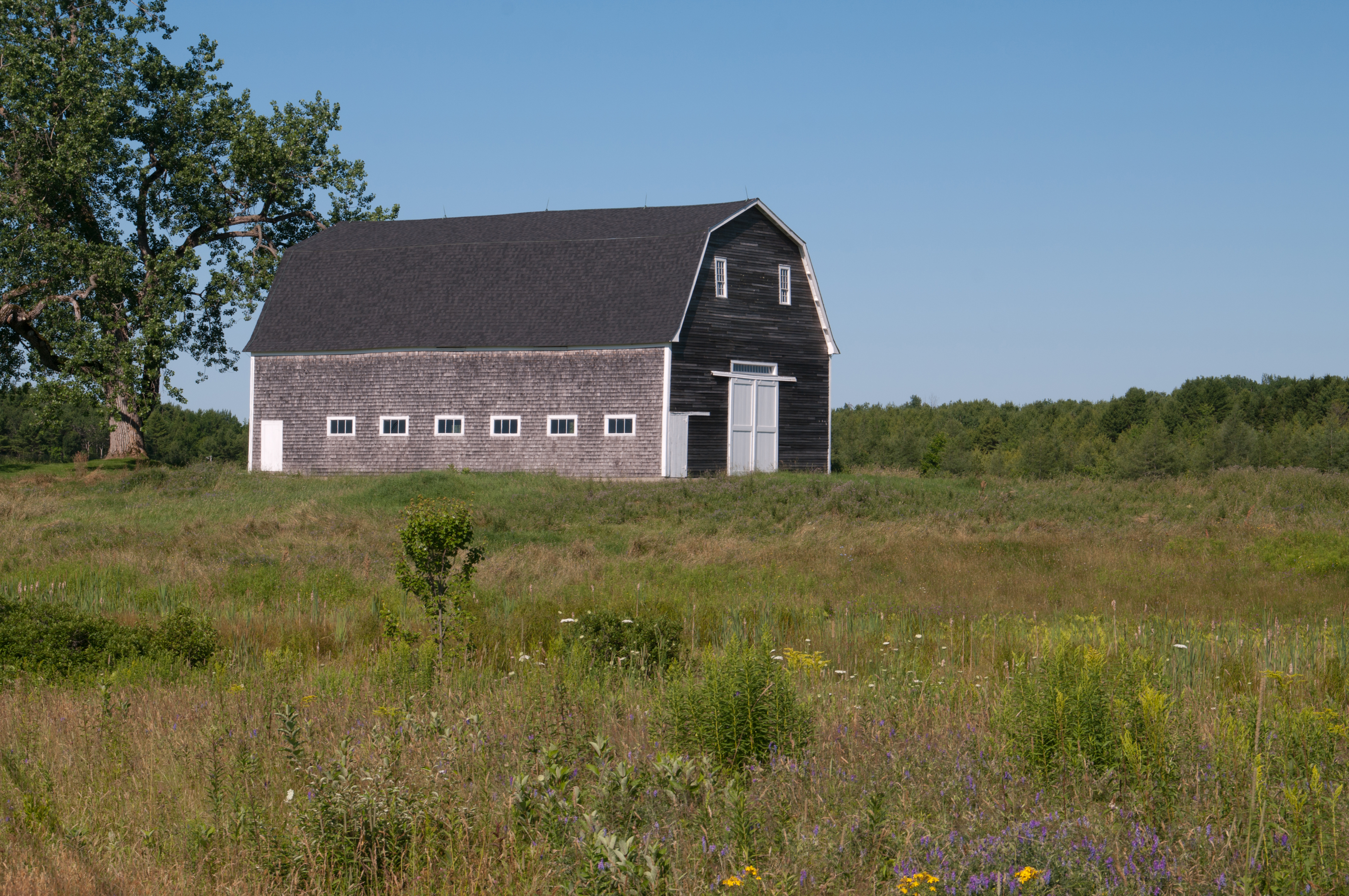
- An historic barn, part of the property of 54 Pennell Way. Built in 1800, the adjacent home was originally that of Captain John A. Given (1779–1840)

- Location within Maine Location within the United States
- Location: Roughly bounded by Pennellville Rd., Middle Bay Cove, and Pennell Way, Brunswick, Maine
- Coordinates: 43°51′42″N 69°57′40″W
- Area: 130 acres (53 ha)
- Architectural style: Greek Revival, Italianate, Federal
- NRHP reference No.: 85002923
- Added to NRHP: October 10, 1985

Pennellville Historic District /ˈpɛnɪlvɪl/ is a residential district in Brunswick, Maine, United States. To locals, the neighborhood is known simply as "Pennellville."

There are several historic ship captains' houses in the District; much of the real estate is waterfront property.

The area's historic significance centers on the shipbuilding company and shipyard, Pennell Brothers, on Middle Bay Cove. Pennell Brothers built wooden ships for the 18th and 19th century shipping trade. About 90 tall ships were produced at the yard.

== Geography and government ==
=== Geography ===
Pennellville is located in the southern portion of Brunswick, Maine, on Middle Bay Cove. The greater bay where it sits is known as Middle Bay, which is a part of the still larger Casco Bay. No official boundaries of Pennellville have been designated.

=== Local government ===
Pennellville is part of the town of Brunswick; it has no government of its own. Residents use Brunswick's post office, police department, fire and rescue departments, library, and public school system. Residents of Pennellville are subject to Brunswick's town's and Maine state's taxation systems.

== History ==
=== Native Americans ===
Before the arrival of white settlers, Pennellville and Brunswick were inhabited by Native Americans. The greater area was known as "Pejepscot", it encompassed the modern-day town of Brunswick and other nearby towns. Native Americans left the area by the year 1725.

=== European settlers ===
Pennellville was settled by Thomas Pennell, who moved to Brunswick from Falmouth (today's Portland) before 1765. Contrary to what appears in some sources, Thomas Pennell was not the son of Thomas Pennell of Gloucester, Massachusetts, nor is there any reliable evidence that he came from the Channel Islands. Pennell's history before his 1735 marriage to Rachel Riggs is unknown. Thomas had five sons (four of them being John, Thomas, Matthew and Stephen). His second son was Thomas Pennell II (1739–1812), who, about 1768, married Alice Anderson of Freeport, Maine. Thomas II lived in the Brunswick area, becoming a tax collector and was a shipwright in the 1790s. Thomas II and Alice had five sons and five daughters. Thomas II taught the sons the shipbuilding trade. Together, they expanded their shipbuilding activities and merchant shipping business in the period around 1800. The fifth child and second son of Thomas II was Jacob Pennell (1778–1841), who was the most prosperous of the five sons.

=== Pennellville today ===
Housing development has been relatively sparse, and much of Pennellville remains has wooded areas and open fields. However, the area has become somewhat more developed since the 1980s. Because of its historical significance, Pennellville was added to the National Register of Historic Places in 1985. Evidence of the shipyard exists. The ways (the wooden rails a ship was launched down) can still be seen sitting in the bay at Pennellville Point at low tide.

== Shipbuilding ==
The earliest records show that the Pennell family was building wooden cargo ships around 1768 in the Pennellville shipyard. Pennell ships carried all sorts of cargoes; among them were timber, deadstock, wine, guano, salt, and fruit. Often people were passengers from for a fee. It is noted, however, that the company was not involved in the American slave trade. The Pennell family were part of a shipbuilding boom. Over the next 114 years (1760–1874), the Pennell family built more than ninety ships in Pennellville. Sometimes the family retained ownership of the ships. In other instances the family sold them. Family members were captains of several of the ships they built.

With the wealth acquired from the successful shipbuilding business, more houses began to follow. Jacob had several sons and, around this time, they christened the company "Pennell Brothers." The area where the business was located soon became known as "Pennellville."

Pennellville was soon considered a community; three roads in the area would bear the Pennell name: Pennellville Road, Old Pennellville Road, and Pennell Way. The area had its own schoolhouse and signs designating the area as separate from Brunswick. In all, the Pennells built seven houses in the area between 1768 and 1877.

=== Pennell Brothers Shipbuilding Company ===
The business operated out of the shipyard located in Pennellville. The site of the yard, including the "ways" from which a ship was launched, was located in the Pennellville bay (known as Middle Bay Cove). The shipyard was moved to three locations in the bay during the operation of the company. The first site was located deep inland, farthest away from the entrance to the ocean. The yard was moved twice locating successively closer to the ocean with each move.

=== Ships ===
The ships the Pennells built are generally referred to as "tall ships." However, they built many different types of tall ships, more specifically classified as barques, schooners, sloops, and brigs. The largest ships weighed over 2,800,000 lbs. (1,400 tons), while the smallest weighed as little as 90,000 lbs. (45 tons). The Benjamin Sewall, the largest built by the Pennells, weighed 2,866,000 lbs. (1,433 tons). Completed in 1874, it would also prove to be the last ship the Pennells built. In 1903, it sank and was lost off Taiwan (known at the time as Formosa).

=== Demise of the shipyard ===
By the end of the 19th century, metal-hulled steamships had replaced wooden ships as a means of transporting goods. Railroads had also come into their for shipping. By the end of the 19th century, it was faster and safer to ship cargoes by railroad from New York City to San Francisco than to sail around Cape Horn. Wooden sailing ships were becoming obsolete.

In 1865, James Pennell (the master builder of the Pennell Brothers company) died as a result of an accident in the shipyard. He was 56 years old. As James was the last master-builder of the Pennell family, his death was a major blow to the workings of the yard. By the early 20th century, the shipyard had gone out of business.

== Historic homes ==
The Pennell family built houses along Pennellville Road. Six of them still stand. The names of the houses are:

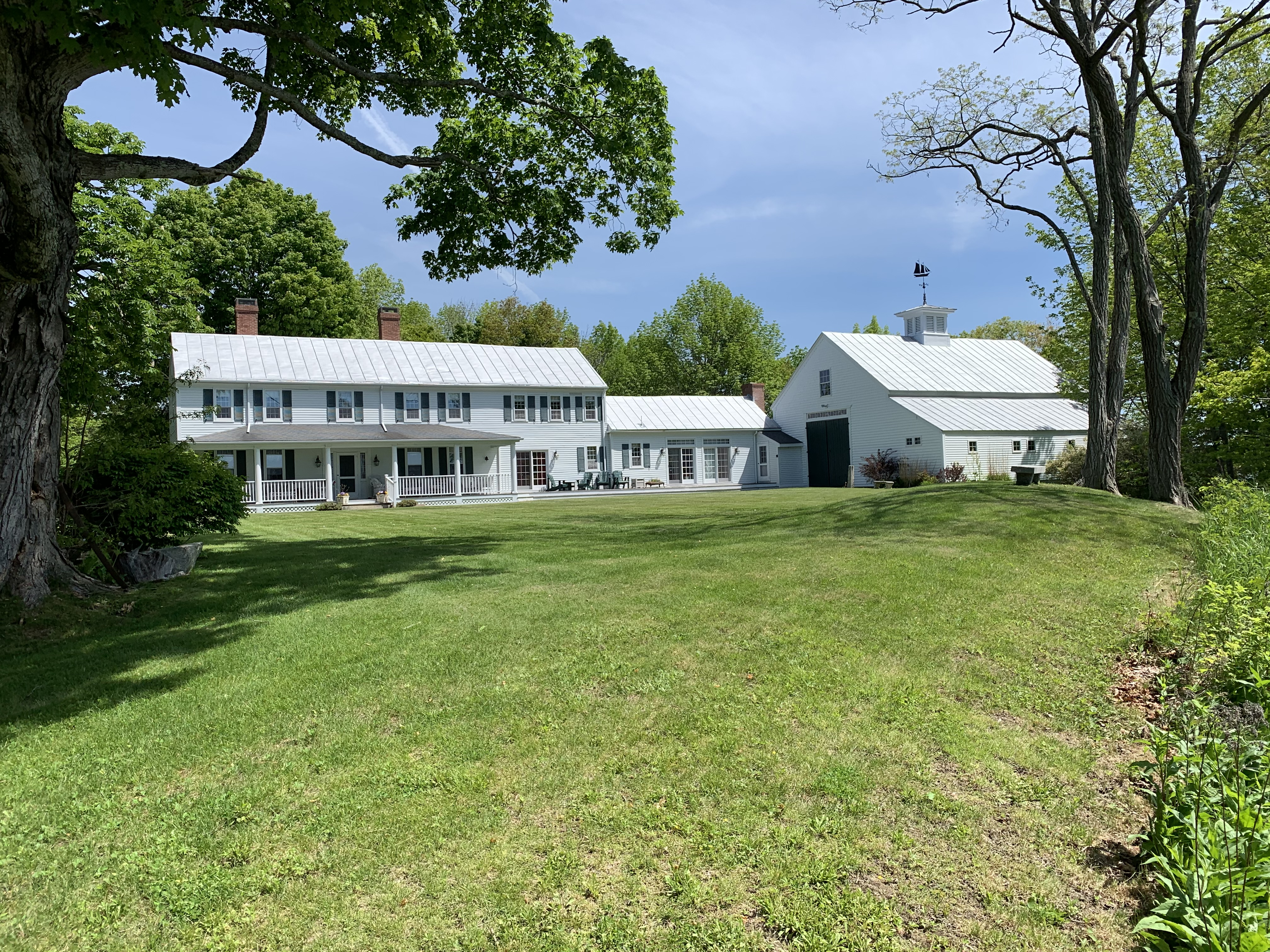
Benjamin D. Pennell House and barn, located at 287 Pennellville Road

Captain William Pennell House, an 1862 remodelling of an original 1780 construction, 258 Pennellville Road

- Thomas Pennell II House, son of Thomas Pennell. 35 Pennellville Road. No longer standing. Pennells lived in the current circa-1785 building until 1870. Bowdoin College purchased the property in 1968, after its period as the Coleman Research Farm. It was later sold to be a private residence
- Jacob Pennell House (1778–1841), son of Thomas Pennell II. 149 Pennellville Road. Built 1794; expanded 1806. Federal style residence, one-and-one-half stories high with clapboard siding and gable roof
- Benjamin D. Pennell House (1804–1861), son of Jacob Pennell. 287 Pennellville Road. Built 1834. Greek Revival style residence, two stories with clapboard siding and gable roof. Recessed porch with classical columns on east wing. One story service wing extends from east side with one-and-one-half story barn built in 1876. Adjacent to the house is a carpenter shop, built circa 1850. It is a one and a half story structure with gable roof and clapboard siding. Across the east facade is a veranda with Italianate style brackets. Around 1900 it became a popular summer boarding house, Bay View Farm. From 2000 through 2022 it was Middle Bay Farm Bed & Breakfast.
- James Pennell House (1809–1865), son of Jacob Pennell. 257 Pennellville Road. Built 1838. Greek Revival style residence, two stories with clapboard siding, gable roof and hexagonal cupola. One story porch with classical columns on south side of main structure, attached carriage barn on west end. The façade of the house has been remodeled; the nine windows are now evenly spaced on the second floor. The cupola has also been given a new aluminum top, a material also now used on the roof
- Charles S. Pennell House (1815–1900), son of Jacob Pennell. 292 Pennellville Road. Built 1843. Greek Revival style residence, two stories with gable roof, clapboard siding, classical entrance on east facade, one story porch on south side. Large two-and- one-half story barn with clapboard siding, gable roof and Italianate style cupola to rear (west) of the house. Charles was the treasurer of Pennell Bros. Helen Keller with Anne Sullivan and John Macy lived here.
- William Pennell House (1781–1832), son of Thomas Pennell III. 258 Pennellville Road. The original building was erected in 1780. It was enlarged and remodeled in 1862. Greek Revival style residence, two stories, clapboard siding, hipped roof, small one story classical portico over east entrance, adjoining two-and-one-half story carriage barn. Jacob II (1807–1882, son of Jacob Pennell) lived here during the days of the Pennell Bros. shipyard. Pennells lived here until the 1900s
- Job Pennell House (1812–1868), son of Jacob Pennell. Built circa 1860. Greek Revival style, two story residence with vinyl siding, gable roof, one-and-one-half story ell and carriage barn

== Captain Abby and Captain John ==
A notable relative of the Pennell family was Pulitzer Prize-winning writer Robert P. T. Coffin (1892–1955). Coffin was the brother of Alice Pennell, and lived in the Jacob Pennell II Mansion (formerly the home of William Pennell). Robert Coffin wrote the critically acclaimed Captain Abby and Captain John (1939), a novel about two Pennell ship captains.

== See also ==
- National Register of Historic Places listings in Cumberland County, Maine
