= Henry Brougham (sportsman) =

England international rugby union player & cricketer (1888–1923)

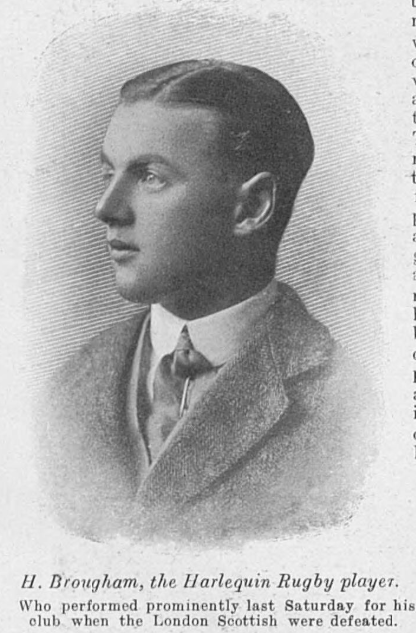
- Born: 8 July 1888 Berkshire, England
- Died: 18 February 1923 (aged 34) La Croix, France
- School: Wellington College, Berkshire
- University: Brasenose College, Oxford

Rugby union career
- Position: wing
Amateur team(s)
| Years | Team | Apps | (Points) |
| 19xx-12 | Harlequin F.C. | | |
International career
| Years | Team | Apps | (Points) |
| 1912 | England | 4 | |
- Military career
- Allegiance: United Kingdom
- Branch: British Army
- Service years: 1914-1917
- Rank: Major
- Unit: Royal Field Artillery
- Conflicts: World War I; Western Front
Medal record
Men's Rackets
| Bronze medal – third place | 1908 London | Men's singles |

Major Henry Brougham (8 July 1888 – 18 February 1923) was an English rugby union and rackets player.

Brougham was born at Wellington College, Berkshire on 8 July 1888, and was educated at that School and at Brasenose College, Oxford.

In 1907 he won the Public Schools Racquets Championships and in the following year reached the semi-final of the Olympic men's singles competition in London to gain a bronze medal. In 1909 he represented Oxford in the annual match against Cambridge University winning in both the singles and doubles.

As a cricketer he had first represented Berkshire in the Minor Counties Championship whilst still at school, and in 1907 he captained the Wellington first XI. He made his first-class debut for Oxford University in 1911 and in the Varsity Match that summer scored a stylish second innings of 84, which helped to turn a close match decisively in Oxford's favour. The following year he also represented the Minor Counties against the South African tourists.

Although he was never a particularly prominent rugby player either school or University, he caught the attention of the England selectors after a number of fine performances on the wing for Harlequin F.C. during the 1911-12 season, and marked his international debut with a try in an 8-0 victory over Wales at Twickenham in January 1912. He played in all four Tests in that season's Five Nations tournament scoring further tries against Ireland and France.

On the outbreak of the First World War in 1914 he gained a commission in the Royal Field Artillery and was posted to France in 1915, eventually attaining the rank of Major. After being caught in a German gas attack in 1917 he was invalided out of active service. In 1918 he contracted tuberculosis whilst commanding a battery in Northern Ireland and never fully recovered his health. He died on 18 February 1923 at La Croix, France from the effects of phthisis.
