= Francis Symes-Thompson =

English cricketer and clergyman

Personal information
- Full name: Francis Symes-Thompson
- Born: 2 February 1875; Marylebone, London, England
- Died: 3 March 1948 (aged 73); Teignmouth, Devon, England
- Batting: Right-handed
- Role: Wicket-keeper
- Relatives: Henry Symes-Thompson (brother); Arthur Page (brother-in-law)

Domestic team information
- Years: Team
- 1898: Oxford University
- 1905–1907: Buckinghamshire

Career statistics
Competition	First-class
Matches	1
Runs scored	7
Batting average	–
100s/50s	–/–
Top score	7*
Catches/stumpings	–/–
- Source: Cricinfo, 29 March 2020

Francis Symes-Thompson (2 February 1875 – 3 March 1948) was an English first-class cricketer and clergyman.

The son of Edward Symes-Thompson, he was born at Marylebone in February 1875. He was educated at Harrow School, before going up to Christ Church, Oxford. While studying at Oxford, he made a single appearance in first-class cricket for Oxford University against the Marylebone Cricket Club at Lord's in 1898. Playing as the Oxford wicket-keeper, he batted once in the match scoring 7 unbeaten runs in the Oxford first-innings.

After graduating from Oxford, he took holy orders in the Church of England. Symes-Thompson's first ecclesiastical post was as curate of High Wycombe in 1899, before holding curacies at Sonning and Ellesborough. He played minor counties cricket for Buckinghamshire in 1905, making four appearances in the Minor Counties Championship. He travelled to South Africa in 1906, where he priest-in-charge of Colesberg at Cape Colony. He returned to England in 1907, where he became the vicar of Claydon, Oxfordshire. He played for Buckinghamshire in the 1907 Minor Counties Championship, making five appearances. From 1911, he was the vicar of Stanton Harcourt in Oxfordshire from 1911–21, before serving as chaplain to the British Embassy at Madrid from 1921–27. Returning to England, he was the reverend of Busbridge in Surrey from 1927–38. In 1938 he was appointed as chaplain at Huggens College at Northfleet in Kent, a post he held until 1944. From 1944, he was the curate of Dawlish, Devon. Symes-Thompson died in Devon at Teignmouth in March 1948. His brother, Henry, also played first-class cricket.
