= Pennel =

Pennel is a surname. Notable people with the surname include:

- John Pennel (1940–1993), American pole vaulter
- Mike Pennel (born 1991), American football nose tackle
- Tyler Pennel (born 1987), American distance runner
- Micah Pennel, American High School Band Teacher in Belle Fourche, SD

== See also ==
- Pennell (disambiguation)
