= Jacob Pennell =

- Born: July 28, 1778; Brunswick, Maine, U.S.
- Died: October 10, 1841 (aged 63); Pennellville, Maine, U.S.
- Resting place: Pennell Cemetery, Pennellville, Maine, U.S.
- Occupation: Shipwright
- Known for: Shipbuilding
- Spouse: Deborah Dunning (m. 1802–1841; his death)
- Parent(s): Thomas Pennell II; Alice Anderson

Jacob Pennell (July 28, 1778 – October 10, 1841) was an American shipwright during a prolific period of shipbuilding in Pennellville, Maine, which was placed on the National Register of Historic Places in 1965. He was the most prosperous of the five sons of Thomas Pennell II, and built at least twenty ships in Middle Bay (the larger bay upon which Pennellville sits) between 1810 and his death in 1841.

== Early life ==
Pennell was born in 1778 in Brunswick, Maine, to Thomas Pennell II (1738–1812) and Alice Anderson (1748–1839). He was one of their ten known children, born after Thomas III and before William, John, Alice, Robert and Margaret. There were three other daughters. They grew up in what is today known as the Thomas Pennell House at 35 Pennellville Road. It was demolished and rebuilt around 1785.

== Career ==
It is believed that, during the War of 1812, Pennell built a "full rigged ship of some two hundred tons burden", but after she was launched, Pennell became unwilling to let it set sail on the ocean, fearing privateers. He instead kept it tied up beside the shipyard.

Pennell was a Brunswick selectman between 1819 and 1823, around a decade before his shipyard hit the height of its production levels.

Pennell sold his shipbuilding business to his son, Jacob Jr., whose sons established Pennell Brothers Shipbuilding Company, which was operated out of the shipyard located in Pennellville. The site of the yard, including the "ways" from which a ship was launched, was located in the Pennellville bay (known as Middle Bay Cove). The shipyard was moved to three locations in the bay during the operation of the company. The first site was located deep inland, farthest away from the entrance to the ocean. The yard was moved twice, becoming successively closer to the ocean with each move.

In 1838, the Mary Pennell brig was completed at the shipyard. It weighed 233 tons and was 65 feet (20 m) long.

== Personal life ==
Pennell acquired most of the land at Pennellville (land originally owned by his father) by buying the lots that had been divided amongst his brothers. In 1794, he built a house with his new-found wealth: the Federal-style home at 149 Pennellville Road. It was expanded in 1806. In the first half of the 20th century, it became the home of poet and author Robert P. Tristram Coffin, whose novel, Captain Abby and Captain John, is about two of the Pennell family. As of 2026, it is the oldest standing house in Pennellville.

In 1802, Pennell married Deborah Dunning of nearby Harpswell, with whom he had nine known children between 1802 and 1828: Eliza, Benjamin, Jacob, James, Job, Charles, Paulina, Robert and John. John became a noted sea captain.

== Death ==
Pennell died in 1841, aged 63. He was interred in Pennell Cemetery in today's Pennellville Historic District. His widow died in 1861 and was buried beside him.

=== Legacy ===
Pennell's ship accounts and other records, dated between 1799 and 1840, are in the possession of Bowdoin College Library. Papers dated 1811–1841 were gifted to the Massachusetts Historical Society in 1917.
