= John Pawle =

English cricketer (1915–2010)

Personal information
- Full name: John Hanbury Pawle
- Born: 18 May 1915; Widford, Hertfordshire, England
- Died: 20 January 2010 (aged 94); Much Hadham, Hertfordshire, England
- Batting: Right-handed
- Role: Batsman

Domestic team information
- Years: Team
- 1935–1947: Essex

Career statistics
Competition	First-class
Matches	34
Runs scored	1,544
Batting average	28.07
100s/50s	3/7
Top score	125
Balls bowled	24
Wickets	0
Bowling average	–
5 wickets in innings	–
10 wickets in match	–
Best bowling	–
Catches/stumpings	14/0
- Source: Cricinfo, 20 July 2013

John Hanbury Pawle (18 May 1915 – 20 January 2010) was an English sportsman, stockbroker and painter.

Pawle was educated at Harrow School, where he played cricket for the school and was captain in 1934, and Pembroke College, Cambridge, where he won blues in 1936 and 1937 as well as playing for Essex. Later he played for Marylebone Cricket Club (MCC) and Free Foresters. At Cambridge he also won a blue for tennis in 1936 and half-blues for real tennis in 1935, 1936 and 1937. He then joined the Westminster School of Art as a student of art.

On the outbreak of war in 1939, Pawle joined the Royal Navy and served in destroyers. After the war he became a partner in a firm of stockbrokers in the City of London. He was British amateur racquets champion four years running, 1947–50, and was twice in the world singles final, losing each time to Jim Dear.

After retiring from the City in 1979, Pawle became a full-time artist, holding a number of one-man shows.
