= Henry Leaf =

British rackets player

Olympic medal record

Men's Rackets
Silver medal – second place	1908 London	Men's singles
Bronze medal – third place	1908 London	Men's doubles

Henry Meredith Leaf, DSO (18 October 1862 – 23 April 1931) was a British rackets player who competed in the 1908 Summer Olympics.

He won the silver medal in the men's singles event. In the men's doubles competition, he won the bronze medal together with Evan Noel.

Prior to taking part in The Olympics, Leaf made two appearances in first-class cricket, playing for the Marylebone Cricket Club in 1884 and GJV Weigall's XI in 1904.

Leaf was a volunteer officer in the Electrical Engineers, a volunteer unit of the Royal Engineers (RE). Their role was to supplement the regular Royal Engineers in wartime by operating searchlights to defend major ports in conjunction with minefields controlled by Volunteer companies of Submarine Miners, RE. Following the outbreak of the Second Boer War, Leaf volunteered for active service. Early in the war, Colonel Robert Baden-Powell improvised searchlights to deter night attacks during the Siege of Mafeking. Soon afterward, a detachment of the Electrical Engineers Volunteers went to South Africa where they operated electric Arc lamp searchlights, the first use of such equipment by the Royal Engineers on the campaign. Leaf was granted the temporary rank of Captain in the Army on 17 March 1900, and served with detachment, which was in South Africa from April to October 1900 in the Transvaal and Orange Free State.

He later served in the World War I in France, and he was awarded a Distinguished Service Order (DSO) for his services.
