= Rackets at the 1908 Summer Olympics – Men's singles =

Rackets at the Olympics

Men's singles rackets at the Games of the IV Olympiad
- Venue: All England Lawn Tennis and Croquet Club
- Dates: April 27–29
- Competitors: 6 from 1 nation

Medalists
1st place, gold medalist(s)		Evan Noel	Great Britain
2nd place, silver medalist(s)		Henry Leaf	Great Britain
3rd place, bronze medalist(s)		John Jacob Astor	Great Britain
3rd place, bronze medalist(s)		Henry Brougham	Great Britain

The men's singles competition was one of two rackets events held as part of the Rackets at the 1908 Summer Olympics programme. Nations could enter up to 12 players, though only Great Britain competed and with a total of 6 players.

== Results ==
=== Standings ===
Place	Name	Nation
1	Evan Noel	Great Britain
2	Henry Leaf	Great Britain
3	John Jacob Astor	Great Britain
3	Henry Brougham	Great Britain
5	Vane Pennell	Great Britain
6	Cecil Browning	Great Britain

=== Bracket ===
First round
Noel (GBR)	3
Browning (GBR)	1

Quarterfinals
Noel (GBR)	3
Pennell (GBR)	0

Semifinals
Noel (GBR)	3
Astor (GBR)	0
Leaf (GBR)	3
Brougham (GBR)	0

Final
Noel (GBR)	w/o (Note: Leaf broke his hand in the doubles competition and was forced to withdraw from the final; Noel was awarded the gold medal.)
Leaf (GBR)
