= Ross Sea =

Deep bay of the Southern Ocean in Antarctica

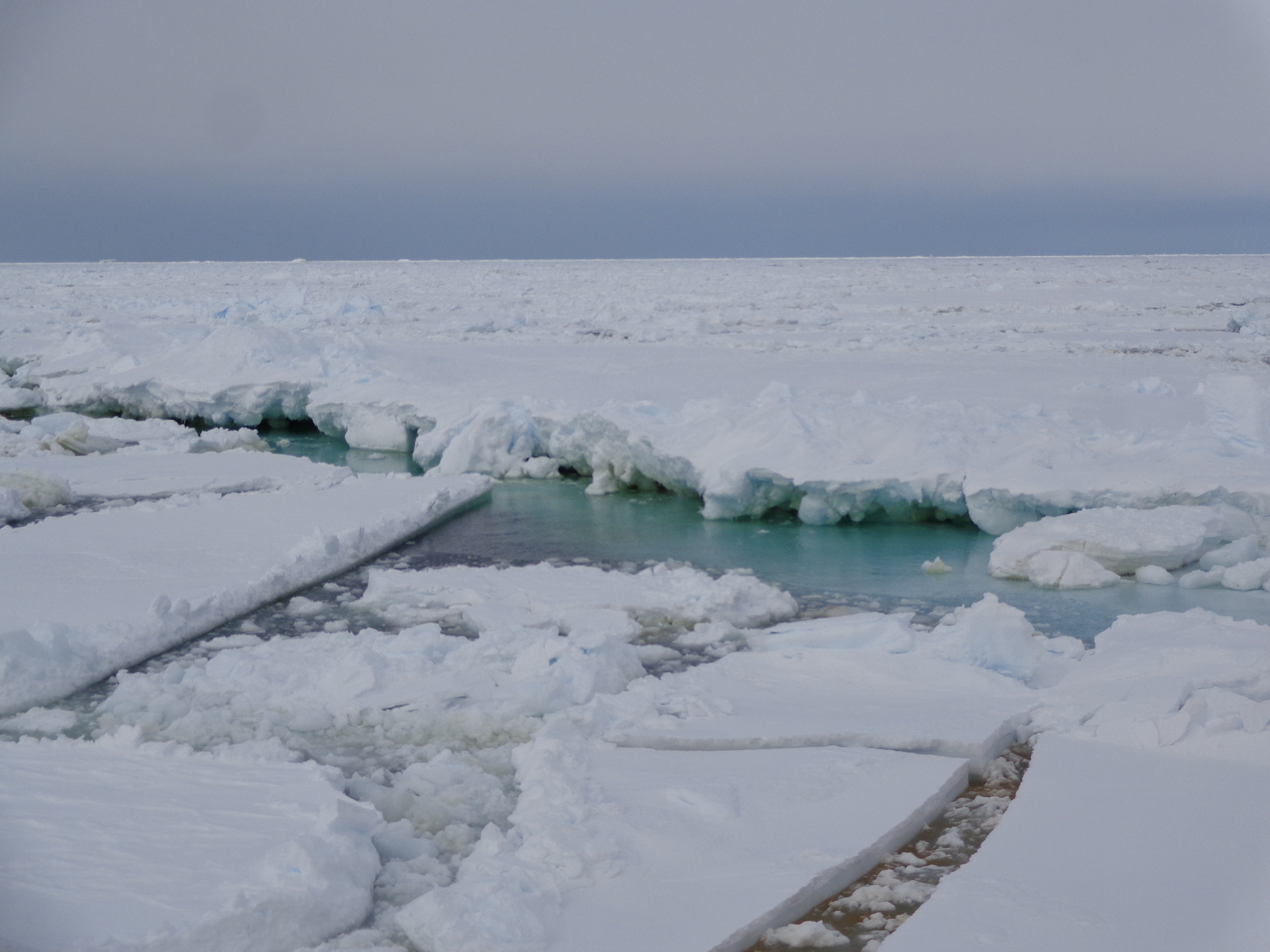
- Sea ice in the Ross Sea

- Location within Antarctica

- Seas of Antarctica, with the Ross Sea in the bottom-left
- Location: Antarctica
- Coordinates: 75°S 175°W
- Type: Sea
- Etymology: James Ross
- Primary outflows: Southern Ocean

The Ross Sea is a deep bay of the Southern Ocean in Antarctica, between Victoria Land and Marie Byrd Land and within the Ross Embayment, and is the southernmost sea on Earth. It derives its name from the British explorer James Clark Ross who visited this area in 1841. To the west of the sea lies Ross Island and Victoria Land, to the east Roosevelt Island and Edward VII Peninsula in Marie Byrd Land, while the southernmost part is covered by the Ross Ice Shelf, and is about 200 miles (320 km) from the South Pole. Its boundaries and area have been defined by the New Zealand National Institute of Water and Atmospheric Research as having an area of 637,000 square kilometres (246,000 sq mi).

The circulation of the Ross Sea is dominated by a wind-driven ocean gyre and the flow is strongly influenced by three submarine ridges that run from southwest to northeast. The circumpolar deep water current is a relatively warm, salty and nutrient-rich water mass that flows onto the continental shelf at certain locations. The Ross Sea is covered with ice for most of the year.

The nutrient-laden water supports an abundance of plankton and this encourages a rich marine fauna. At least ten mammal species, six bird species and 95 fish species are found here, as well as many invertebrates, and the sea remains relatively unaffected by human activities. New Zealand insists that the sea comes under its jurisdiction as part of the Ross Dependency. Marine biologists consider the sea to have a high level of biological diversity and it is the site of much scientific research. It is also the focus of some environmentalist groups who have campaigned to have the area proclaimed as a world marine reserve. In 2016 an international agreement established the region as a marine park.

== Description ==
The Ross Sea was discovered by the Ross expedition in 1841. In the west of the Ross Sea is Ross Island with the Mt. Erebus volcano; in the east is Roosevelt Island. The southern part is covered by the Ross Ice Shelf. Roald Amundsen started his South Pole expedition in 1911 from the Bay of Whales, which was located at the shelf. In the western parts of the Ross Sea, McMurdo Sound is a port that is usually free of ice during the summer. The southernmost part of the Ross Sea is Gould Coast, which is approximately 200 miles (320 km) from the geographic South Pole.

== Geology ==
=== The continental shelf ===
Bathymetric map of the Ross Sea, Antarctica

The Ross Sea (and Ross Ice Shelf) overlies a deep continental shelf. Although the average depth of the world's continental shelves (at the shelf break joining the continental slope) is about 130 meters, the Ross shelf average depth is about 500 meters. It is shallower in the western Ross Sea (east longitudes) than the east (west longitudes). This over-deepened condition is due to cycles of erosion and deposition of sediments from expanding and contracting ice sheets overriding the shelf during Oligocene and later time, and is also found on other locations around Antarctica. Erosion was more focused on the inner parts of the shelf while deposition of sediment dominated the outer shelf, making the inner shelf deeper than the outer.

Ross Sea Antarctica sea floor geology showing major basins and drill sites

Seismic studies in the latter half of the twentieth century defined the major features of the geology of the Ross Sea. The deepest or basement rocks, are faulted into four major north trending graben systems, which are basins for sedimentary fill. These basins include the Northern and Victoria Land Basin in the west, the Central Trough, and the Eastern Basin, which has approximately the same width as the other three. The Coulman High separates the Victoria Land Basin and Central Trough and the Central High separates the Central Trough and Eastern Basin. The majority of the faulting and accompanying graben formation along with crustal extension occurred during the rifting away of the Zealandia microcontinent from Antarctica in Gondwana during Cretaceous time. Paleogene and Neogene -age and faulting and extension is restricted to the Victoria Land Basin and Northern Basin.

=== Stratigraphy ===
Basement grabens are filled with rift sediments of uncertain character and age. A widespread unconformity has cut into the basement and sedimentary fill of the large basins. Above this major unconformity (named RSU-6) are a series of glacial marine sedimentary units deposited during multiple advances and retreats of the Antarctic Ice Sheet across the sea floor of the Ross Sea during the Oligocene and later.

=== Geologic drilling ===
Drill holes have recovered cores of rock from the western edges of the sea. The most ambitious recent efforts are the Cape Roberts Project (CRP) and the ANDRILL project. Deep Sea Drilling Project (DSDP) Leg 28 completed several holes (270–273) farther from land in the central and western portions of the sea. These resulted in defining a stratigraphy for most of the older glacial sequences, which comprise Oligocene and younger sediments. The Ross Sea-wide major unconformity RSU-6 has been proposed to mark a global climate event and the first appearance of the Antarctic Ice Sheet in the Oligocene.

During 2018, Expedition 374 of the International Ocean Discovery Program (IODP), the latest successor to the DSDP, drilled additional holes (U1521–1525) in the central Ross Sea for determining Neogene and Quaternary ice sheet history.

=== Basement ===
The nature of the basement rocks and the fill within the grabens are known in few locations. Basement rocks have been sampled at DSDP Leg 28 drill site 270 where metamorphic rocks of unknown age were recovered, and in the eastern Ross Sea where a bottom dredge was collected. In both these locations the metamorphic rocks are mylonites deformed in the Cretaceous suggesting extreme stretching of the Ross Embayment during that time.

Marie Byrd Land: Rocks exposed in western Marie Byrd Land on the Edward VII Peninsula and within the Ford Ranges are candidates for basement in the eastern Ross Sea. The oldest rocks are Permian sediments of the Swanson Formation, which is slightly metamorphosed. The Ford granodiorite of Devonian age intrudes these sediments. Cretaceous Byrd Coast granite in turn intrudes the older rocks. The Byrd Coast and older formations have been cut by basalt dikes. Scattered through the Ford Ranges and Fosdick Mountains are late Cenozoic volcanic rocks that are not found to the west on Edward VII Peninsula. Metamorphic rocks, migmatites, are found in the Fosdick Mountains and Alexandra Mountains. These were metamorphosed and deformed in the Cretaceous.

The Ross Supergroup system and Beacon Supergroup: Ross System rocks exposed in Victoria Land and in the Transantarctic Mountains on the western side of the Ross Sea are possible basement rock below the sedimentary cover of the sea floor. The rocks are of upper Precambrian to lower Paleozoic in age, deformed in many places during the Ross Orogeny in the Cambrian. These miogeosyncline metasedimentary rocks are partly composed of calcium carbonate, often including limestone. Groups within the Ross System include the Robertson Bay Group, Priestley Group, Skelton Group, Beardmore Group, Byrd Group, Queen Maud Group, and Koettlitz Group. The Robertson Bay Group compares closely with other Ross System members. The Priestley Group rocks are similar to those of the Robertson Bay Group and include dark slates, argillites, siltstones, fine sandstones and limestones. They can be found near the Priestley and Campbell glaciers. For thirty miles along the lower Skelton Glacier are the calcareous greywackes and argillites of the Skelton Group. The region between the lower Beardmore Glacier and the lower Shackelton Glacier sits the Beardmore Group. North of the Nimrod Glacier are four block faulted ranges that make up the Byrd Group. The contents of the Queen Maud Group area are mainly post-tectonic granite.

Beacon Sandstone of Devonian-Triassic age and the Ferarr volcanic rocks of Jurassic age are separated from the Ross Supergroup by the Kukri Peneplain. Beacon rocks are reported to have been recovered in the drill cores of the Cape Roberts Project at the western edge of the Ross Sea.

== Oceanography ==
=== Circulation ===
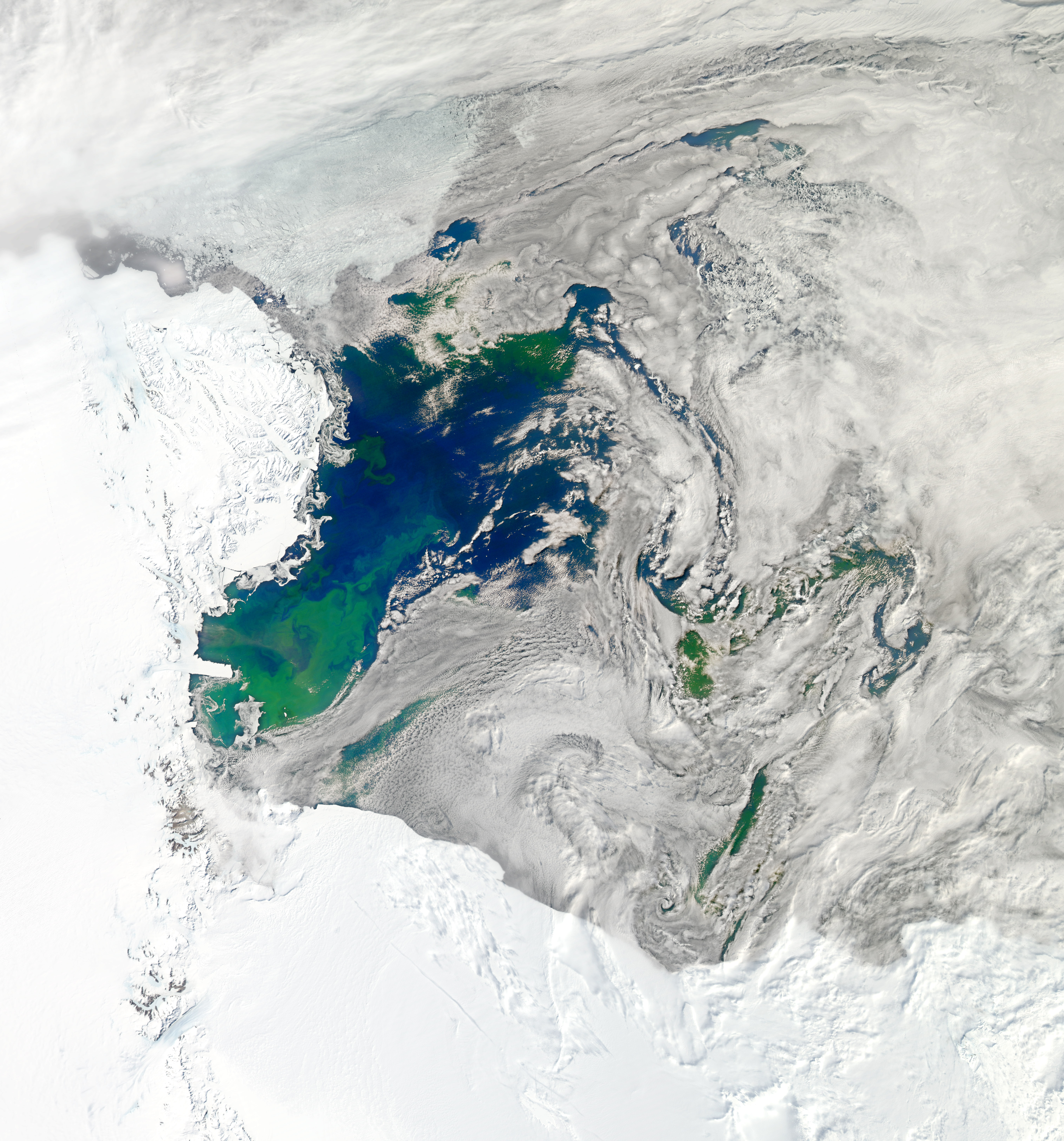
Bloom in the Ross Sea, January 2011

The Ross Sea circulation, dominated by polynya processes, is in general very slow-moving. Circumpolar Deep Water (CDW) is a relatively warm, salty and nutrient-rich water mass that flows onto the continental shelf at certain locations in the Ross Sea. Through heat flux, this water mass moderates the ice cover. The near-surface water also provides a warm environment for some animals and nutrients to excite primary production. CDW transport onto the shelf is known to be persistent and periodic, and is thought to occur at specific locations influenced by bottom topography. The circulation of the Ross Sea is dominated by a wind-driven gyre. The flow is strongly influenced by three submarine ridges that run from southwest to northeast. Flow over the shelf below the surface layer consists of two anticyclonic gyres connected by a central cyclonic flow. The flow is considerable in spring and winter, due to influencing tides. The Ross Sea is covered with ice for much of the year and ice concentrations and in the south-central region little melting occurs. Ice concentrations in the Ross Sea are influenced by winds with ice remaining in the western region throughout the austral spring and generally melting in January due to local heating. This leads to extremely strong stratification and shallow mixed layers in the western Ross Sea. Observation and data access in the region is coordinated by the Ross Sea Working Group of the Southern Ocean Observing System.

== Ecological importance and conservation ==
The Ross Sea is one of the last stretches of seas on Earth that remains relatively unaffected by human activities. Consequently, the Ross Sea has become a focus of numerous environmentalist groups who have campaigned to make the area a world marine reserve, citing the rare opportunity to protect the Ross Sea from a growing number of threats and destruction. The Ross Sea is regarded by marine biologists as having a very high biological diversity and as such has a long history of human exploration and scientific research, with some datasets going back over 150 years.

=== Biodiversity ===
The Ross Sea is home to at least 10 mammal species, half a dozen species of birds, 95 species of fish, and over 1,000 invertebrate species. Some species of birds that nest in and near the Ross Sea include the Adélie penguin, emperor penguin, Antarctic petrel, snow petrel, and south polar skua. Marine mammals in the Ross Sea include the Antarctic minke whale, killer whale, Weddell seal, crabeater seal, and leopard seal. Antarctic toothfish, Antarctic silverfish, Antarctic krill, and crystal krill also swim in the cold Antarctic water of the Ross Sea. A distinct ecotype of Orca called Type C can be found in the Ross Sea.

Albatrosses rely on wind to travel and cannot get airborne in a calm. The westerlies do not extend as far south as the ice edge and therefore albatrosses do not travel often to the ice-pack. An albatross would be trapped on an ice floe for many days if it landed in the calm.

The coastal parts of the sea contain a number of rookeries of Adélie and Emperor penguins, which have been observed at a number of places around the Ross Sea, both towards the coast and outwards in open sea.

A 10-metre (32.8 feet) long colossal squid weighing 495 kilograms (1,091 lb) was captured in the Ross Sea on February 22, 2007.

=== Toothfish fishery ===
In 2010, the Ross Sea Antarctic toothfish fishery was independently certified by the Marine Stewardship Council, and has been rated as a 'Good Alternative' by the Monterey Bay Aquarium Seafood Watch program. However, a 2008 document submitted to the Commission for the Conservation of Antarctic Marine Living Resources (CCAMLR) reported significant declines in toothfish populations of McMurdo Sound coinciding with the development of the industrial toothfishing industry since 1996, and other reports have noted a coincident decrease in the number of orcas. The report recommended a full moratorium on fishing over the Ross shelf. In October 2012, Philippa Ross, James Ross' great, great, great granddaughter, voiced her opposition to fishing in the area.

In the southern winter of 2017 New Zealand scientists discovered the breeding ground of the Antarctic toothfish in the northern Ross Sea seamounts for the first time underscoring how little is known about the species.

=== Marine Protected Area ===
On 28 October 2016, at its annual meeting in Hobart, a Ross Sea marine park was declared by the CCAMLR, under an agreement signed by 24 countries and the European Union. It protected over 1.5 million square kilometers of sea and was the world's largest protected area at the time. A sunset provision of 35 years was part of negotiations. Sunset provisions are controversial in the conservation community, as such clauses water down protections meant to last indefinitely. It also fails to meet the technical definition of a marine protected area by organizations such as the International Union for Conservation of Nature, which requires a MPA to be permanent.

Beginning in 2005, the Commission for the Conservation of Antarctic Marine Living Resources (CCAMLR) commissioned scientific analysis and planning for Marine Protected Areas (MPA) in the Antarctic. In 2010, the CCAMLR endorsed their Scientific Committee's proposal to develop Antarctic MPAs for conservation purposes. The US State Department submitted a proposal for a Ross Sea MPA at the September 2012 meeting of the CCAMLR. At this stage, a sustained campaign by various international and national NGOs commenced to accelerate the process.

In July 2013, the CCAMLR held a meeting in Bremerhaven in Germany, to decide whether to turn the Ross Sea into an MPA. The deal failed due to Russia voting against it, citing uncertainty about whether the commission had the authority to establish a marine protected area.

In October 2014, the MPA proposal was again defeated at the CCAMLR by votes against from China and Russia. At the October 2015 meeting a revised MPA proposal from the US and New Zealand was expanded with the assistance of China, who however shifted the MPA's priorities from conservation by allowing commercial fishing. The proposal was again blocked by Russia.

== See also ==
- Beaufort Island
- Glomar Challenger Basin
- Hallett Ridge
- Iceberg B-15
- Mawson Bank
- McMurdo Station
- Pennell Bank
- Ross Canyon
- Ross Dependency
- Ross Gyre
- Ross Ice Shelf
