= J. J. Lankes =

American artist and writer (1884–1960)

Julius John (J.J.) Lankes
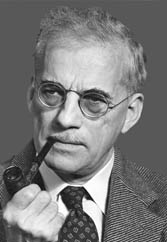
- Born: August 31, 1884; Buffalo, New York
- Died: April 22, 1960 (aged 75); Durham, North Carolina
- Education: Boston Museum of Fine Arts and Albright Art School, Buffalo, New York
- Known for: Woodcut
- Movement: Arts and crafts

Julius John Lankes (1884–1960) was an illustrator, a woodcut print artist, author, and college professor.

== Early life and education ==
Lankes was born on August 31, 1884, in Buffalo, New York, to parents of German heritage. His father worked in a lumber mill and brought home small scraps of wood. "It was like getting a daily present," wrote Lankes, who played with and learned about all the different kinds of wood, as a child. He graduated from the Buffalo Commercial and Electro-Mechanical Institute in 1902 and worked as a draftsman specializing in patent drawings before continuing his art studies at the Art Students' League of Buffalo and the Boston Museum of Fine Arts.

== Artist ==
Lankes worked primarily in the woodcut medium and had studios, at various times, in both Gardenville, New York and Hilton Village in Newport News, Virginia. His works, numbering about thirteen hundred, helped elevate woodblock prints beyond illustrations in commercial productions to recognition as a fine art. His work was heavily influenced by the Arts and Crafts movement and by William Morris.

He illustrated works for many notable authors, including American poet Robert Frost, American author Sherwood Anderson, and British author Beatrix Potter. Lankes maintained lifelong friendships and collaborations with both Robert Frost and Sherwood Anderson.

Major public collections of his woodcut prints are located at the Rauner Special Collections Library, Dartmouth College; the Mead Art Museum, Amherst College; Special Collections & Archives, Middlebury College; the Metropolitan Museum of Art, New York; the Burchfield-Penney Art Center, Buffalo State College; the Virginia State Library, Richmond, Virginia; the Muscarelle Museum of Art, College of William and Mary, Williamsburg, Virginia; and the Crocker Art Museum, Sacramento, California. Other collections include the Congressional Library in D.C.; Newark Public Library in New Jersey; Marsh Museum at University of Richmond, Virginia and the Museum of Fine Arts in Houston. The Pennsylvania Dutch Barn Series is at the Pennsylvania State Museum in Harrisburg and the Doremus Series, designed by Rockwell Kent and engraved by J.J.Lankes, is at Plattsburgh State University in New York.

== Career ==
In 1914, Lankes married Edee Maria Bartlett. In 1915, his first child was born with three more to follow. Having a wife and family to support, he obtained work as foreman of the drafting room at Newton Arms, a rifle factory in Buffalo. In 1917, using a V-cutting tool intended for cross-hatching grips on gunstocks, and a piece of wood from an apple tree blown down by a storm, he cut his first woodblock titled "Flying Gosling."

Lankes received his first opportunity as an illustrator in the woodcut medium from Max Eastman, who edited The Liberator. Lankes found many kindred spirits at the Liberator and was even listed on the masthead as a contributing editor. Like many leftists in the early 20th century, his views grew more moderate later on but he continued to have a great disdain for the bourgeoisie and a deep respect for the working class, which is always evident in his art.

It was Lankes' wife's idea to move to Virginia. Lankes would have a love-hate relationship with the American South for the rest of his life but the move proved to be very fruitful for inspiration and new friends and colleagues. In 1930, Lankes and his Hilton Village neighbor Eager Wood of the Virginia Press, collaborated on Virginia Woodcuts, a folio-sized, limited edition volume of 25 prints of rural Virginia scenes.

Lankes wrote and illustrated A Woodcut Manual, published by Henry Holt in 1932. It was written in a very folksy style and well received by the art and literary community, though not a commercial success in its time. In 2006, The University of Tampa published a new edition of this book with selected letters and other writings, edited by Welford Dunaway Taylor.

Lankes wrote a great many letters, collections of which may be found in Buffalo and Erie County Library, Dartmouth College, Amherst (College and town library), Middlebury College, and Wisconsin State Library. A substantial archive of Lankes' writings are with Professor Taylor at the University of Richmond.

In 1933, Lankes was persuaded by Frost to accept a position as visiting professor at Wells College in Aurora, New York. He taught at Wells for seven years.

In 1940, Harper & Brothers published an edition of Thomas Gray's Elegy Written in a Country Churchyard, with thirty woodcut illustrations by Lankes and an introduction by Pulitzer prize-winning poet Robert P. T. Coffin. In 1941 Lankes was elected into the National Academy of Design as an Associate member and became a full Academician in 1954.

Lankes produced 41 woodcut renderings of Pennsylvania Dutch barns, some of which were published in the Journal of the American Institute of Architects. A book was planned but never published, which was a great source of disappointment to Lankes, who considered these works to be his crowning achievement.

== Later life ==
Lankes joined the reproduction section, as head of technical illustrating, of the National Advisory Committee for Aeronautics in 1943, where he remained until 1950. In 1951 Lankes moved to Durham, North Carolina. He suffered a debilitating stroke in 1959 and died on April 22, 1960, in Durham. J. J. Lankes was buried in Buffalo on April 25, 1960.

== Published works ==
- "Afternoon and Evening". American Mercury: 238–43. October 1930.
- A Woodcut Manual. New York: Henry Holt Co. 1932. OCLC 2928315.
- Virginia Woodcuts. Newport News, VA: Virginia Press. 1930. OCLC 2431896.
- Woodcut Record. self published.
- A Brief History of Aeronautics, as Pictured on the Murals in the Rotunda of the Administration Building, Langley Memorial Aeronautical Laboratory. Langley Field, VA: Langley Memorial Aeronautical Laboratory. 1946. OCLC 197259.
- "Pictures Out of Wood". Child Life: 25–27. March 1947.
- "The First Christmas Card". Think: 20–21, 36. November 1953.

== Published illustrations ==
- Stone, Wilbur Macey (1922). Lankes, His Woodcut Bookplates. Gardenville, New York: F. J. Lankes. OCLC 2032876.
- Frost, Robert (1923). New Hampshire. J.J. Lankes (illustration). Holt.
- Whitaker, Charles Harris (October 1924). "Some Thoughts About Barns". Journal of the American Institute of Architects. 12 (10).
- Taggard, Genevieve (1925). May Days. decorations by J. J. Lankes. Boni & Liveright.
- Cooley, Rossa B. (1926). Homes of the Freed. J.J. Lankes (illustration). New York: New Republic. OCLC 2305976.
- Lagerlöf, Selma; Velma Stanston Howard (1926). Mårbacka. J.J. Lankes (illustration). Garden City, New Jersey: Doubleday, Doran.
- Malam, Charles (1928). Spring Plowing. J.J.Lankes (decorations). New York: Doubleday Doran.
- Frost, Robert (1929). West-Running Brook. J.J. Lankes (illustration). Holt.
- Reese, Lizette Woodworth (1929). A Victorian village; reminiscences of other days. J.J. Lankes (illustration). New York: Farrar & Rinehart. OCLC 503314.
- Malam, Charles (1930). Upper Pasture. J.J. Lankes (decorations). New York: Farrar & Rinehart.
- Bradford, Roark (1931). John Henry. J.J. Lankes (illustration). New York: The Literary Guild. OCLC 36371744.
- Taggard, Genevieve (1933). Remembering Vaughan in New England. J.J. Lankes (illustration). New York: Arrow Editions. OCLC 12979065.
- Burnett, Whit (W.R.) (1934). The Goodhues of Sinking Creek. J.J. Lankes (illustration). New York: Harper & Brothers. OCLC 2362670.
- Coffin, Robert P. T. (1937). Saltwater Farm. J.J. Lankes (illustration). New York: The McMillan Co. OCLC 395724.
- Gray, Thomas (1940). Elegy Written in a Country Churchyard. J.J. Lankes (illustration). New York: Harper and Brothers.
- Potter, Beatrix (1944). Wag-by-Wall. J.J. Lankes (decorations). Boston: The Horn Book. OCLC 918922.
- Neel, Marvin (1951). Weather Sayings. J.J. Lankes (decorations). Ceres, Virginia: Backwoods Press.
- Derleth, August (1956). Country Poems. J.J. Lankes (decorations). Iowa City: Prairie Press.
