= Edwin Biedermann =

British sportsman (1877–1929)

Edwin Anthony Biedermann (5 July 1877 - 31 October 1929) was a British sportsman who represented Great Britain in jeu de paume at the 1908 Summer Olympics.

== Early life ==
Biedermann was born on 5 July 1877 in Kensington, London, the son of Alfred Biedermann and his wife Henrietta (Helene) Biedermann. He won a real tennis (jeu de paume) Blue at Oxford University, playing in the doubles in 1898 and in singles and doubles in 1899 and 1900.

== Career ==
In 1907, he was appointed the first Honorary Secretary of the Tennis, Rackets and Fives Association and held that post for many years. Biedermann was a member of the Council of the British Olympic Association in 1908 and 1912. He represented Great Britain in jeu de paume at the 1908 Summer Olympics.

== Personal life ==
In 1910, he married Alice Theresa Rosenberg in London. In 1912, he was living at Talbot House, Eaton Terrace, Belgravia, London.

In October 1917, he changed his surname by deed poll to Best and died in London on 31 October 1929.
