= Jamsetji Merwanji =

Indian racquets player

Jamsetji Merwanji (also spelled Jamsetjee; born 1871/2 (Note: He was aged 39 in February 1911.)) was an Indian professional racquets player, who was world champion of the sport from 1903 to 1911.

== Profile ==
He was a Parsi who worked as a "marker" (club professional) at the Bombay Gymkhana. In 1903 in England, he played Gilbert Browne at Queen's Club and Prince's Club for the vacant world title, winning by five games to one. The world title was contested by challenge, and the distance between India and Britain or America meant he never had to defend his title until 1911. His closest rival in India was his brother Padanji, who was a marker in Pune. He was finally challenged in late 1909, for 5,000 rupees, by Charles Williams, who had beaten amateur E. M. Baerlein to become English champion. The contest did not take place until 1911, when several Indian sports teams journeyed to Britain around the coronation of George V and 1911 Imperial Conference. Jamsetji easily beat Baerlein in a warm-up match, but Williams, 17 years Jamsetji's junior, beat him at Queen's Club by five games to nil.
