= Mark Briers =

English cricketer

Personal information
- Full name: Mark Paul Briers
- Born: 21 April 1968 (age 58); Loughborough, Leicestershire
- Batting: Right-handed
- Bowling: Leg break

Domestic team information
- Years: Team
- 1990: Bedfordshire
- 1991–1993: Durham
- 1994–1996: Cornwall
- 1997–1998: Herefordshire

Career statistics
Competition	First-class	List A
Matches	17	11
Runs scored	462	217
Batting average	17.76	27.12
100s/50s	0/4	0/2
Top score	62*	69
Balls bowled	981	80
Wickets	12	2
Bowling average	57.50	47.50
5 wickets in innings	0	0
10 wickets in match	0	0
Best bowling	3/109	1/0
Catches/stumpings	8/–	2/–
- Source: Cricinfo, 23 December 2009

Mark Paul Briers (born 21 April 1968) is a former English cricketer. He was born in Loughborough in Leicestershire.

Briers represented Bedfordshire in the 1990 Minor Counties Championship where he made his debut against Lincolnshire. Briers represented Bedfordshire in five Minor Counties Championship matches that season, the last of which came against Suffolk.

In 1991 Briers joined Durham and played in their final season as a Minor County.

With Durham's promotion to first-class status in 1992, thereby gaining entry to the 1992 County Championship, Briers made his first-class debut against Somerset. Briers made his List-A debut in the same season against Sussex in the Sunday League. Briers played seventeen first-class matches for Durham, scoring 462 runs at an average of 17.17, including four half-centuries with a top score of 62*. Briers final first-class match came against Lancashire in 1993, with his final one-day appearance for the club coming in the same season against Middlesex County Cricket Club.

After being released by Durham at the end of the 1993 County Championship, Briers proceeded in joining Cornwall, representing the county in twenty Minor Counties Championship matches between 1994 and 1996, the last of which came against Devon County Cricket Club. Briers was awarded with his Cornwall cap in 1995.

Briers left Cornwall at the end of the 1995 season and joined Herefordshire County Cricket Club for the 1996 season. Briers played in eleven Minor Counties matches for Herefordshire until 1998, with his final Minor Counties Championship appearance coming against Cheshire in August 1998. Briers also represented the club in a single List-A match against Middlesex in the 1998 NatWest Trophy, this was Briers final List-A appearance.

Briers retired from representative cricket at the end of the 1998 English cricket season.

Since 1994 Briers has been a master at Cheltenham College and is the Rackets and Cricket Professional. He is widely acknowledged as coaching and developing the success of the current world rackets champion, old boy James Stout.
