= Arnold Palmer (tennis) =

British real tennis player (1886–1973)

Personal information
- Born: 14 September 1886 South Kensington, England
- Died: 27 November 1973 (aged 87) Yattendon, England

Sport
- Sport: Jeu de paume

Arnold Palmer (14 September 1886 – 27 November 1973) was a British real tennis player who competed in the jeu de paume tournament at the 1908 Summer Olympics.
