= Charles Williams (rackets) =

English rackets player

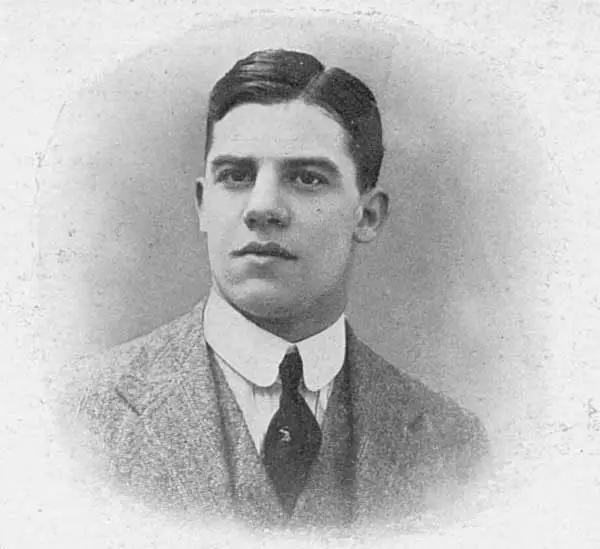
- Williams c. 1910
- Born: July 28, 1888; East Fulham, London, England
- Died: October 27, 1935 (aged 47); Chicago, Illinois, U.S.
- Resting place: Rosehill Cemetery, Chicago, Illinois
- Known for: Rackets world champion (1911–1913, 1929–1935); Survivor of the sinking of RMS Titanic
- Spouse: Lois Wilkins (m. 1910)
- Children: 6

Charles Eugene Williams (28 July 1888 – 27 October 1935) was an English rackets player who was rackets world champion from 1911 to 1913 and again from 1929 till his death in 1935.

Williams survived of the sinking of the RMS Titanic in April 1912. During the sinking, Williams volunteered to help row Lifeboat No. 14 and later volunteered to return to the wreck site with Fifth Officer Harold Lowe and surviving members of the crew to help rescue any survivors in the water.

== Rackets career ==
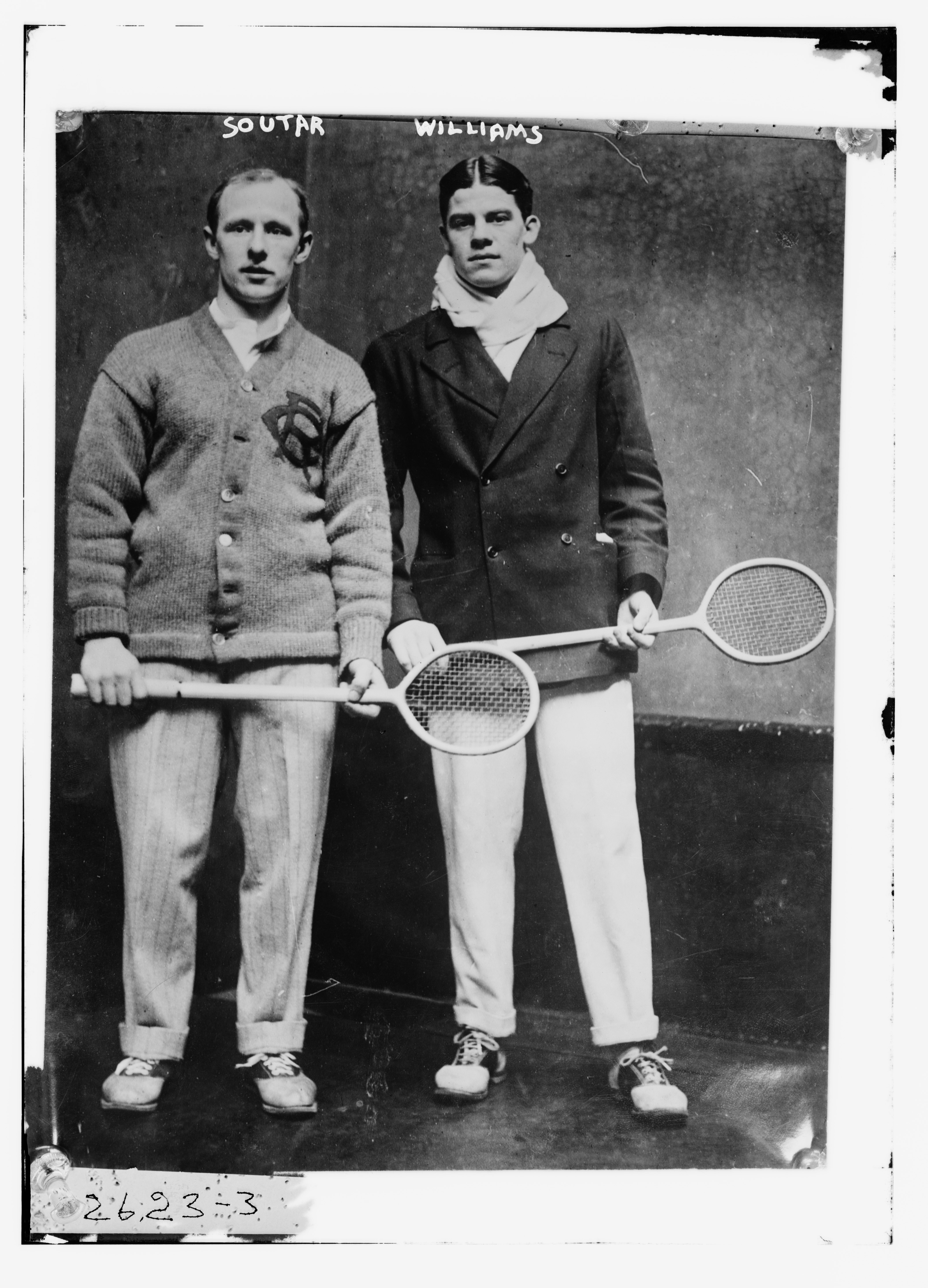
Williams (right) with American rackets player Jock Soutar (left)

Born in East Fulham in 1888, he was a ball boy at the Prince's Club before turning professional.

Williams became a professional rackets player and the school coach at a young age, playing from the Harrow Club at Harrow School. In January 1911 he competed in and won the Open Championship of England defeating Edgar Maximilian Baerlein.

Just over three months later he was the challenger for the World Championship against the holder Jamsetji Merwanji from India. Williams won the first leg at the Queen's Club and then in the second leg played out a draw at the Prince's Club after he had already secured the one game he needed to claim the title outright. He had become the world champion aged just 22.

He lost the Championship to Jock Soutar from the United States in 1913 before failing to regain the title in a rematch in 1922. He finally regained the Championship after beating Soutar in 1929.

== RMS Titanic ==
Williams boarded the RMS Titanic as a second class passenger, heading to the United States to defend his title against American rackets player George E. Standing. On the night of 14 April, Williams left the squash racquet court at 10:30 PM and was in the second class smoking room at the time of the collision. Following the collision, he reportedly rushed out and saw the iceberg as it passed by.

According to Fifth Officer Harold Lowe, Williams was taken into Lifeboat No. 14 to help row due to a shortage of crewmembers who knew how to row. Later on, he volunteered to stay in the lifeboat and return to the wrecksite with a select few crewmembers who also volunteered. He was the only passenger left in the lifeboat when it returned to rescue survivors. The crew managed to save three or four from the water and around twelve others on the swamped Collapsible Boat A.

Afterwards, he was taken aboard RMS Carpathia along with the rest of the occupants of Lifeboat 14. He was initially reported as being amongst those lost but this was soon corrected. His match against Standing was postponed and Williams returned to England soon after the Carpathia arrived in New York City.

== Personal life ==
In 1910, Williams married Lois Wilkins. The couple had six children together: Ninian, John, Dorothy, Jean, and Hilda. In 1924, the family emigrated to the United States with records showing that they arrived in New York City on the RMS Olympic. They eventually settled down in 5524 Lakewood Avenue, in Chicago, where Williams was listed as a "tennis instructor" in the 1930 census.

Williams died on 27 October 1935 after falling ill with bronchial pneumonia. He was buried at Rosehill Cemetery three days later. His widow Lois moved to Evanston, Illinois and died in November 1959, being buried alongside her husband afterwards.

Awards and achievements
Preceded by Jamsetji Merwanji; Jock Soutar	Rackets World Champion; 1911–1913; 1929–1935	Succeeded by Jock Soutar; David S. Milford (in 1937)
