= Jeu de paume at the 1908 Summer Olympics =

Men's singles jeu de paume at the Games of the IV Olympiad
- Venue: Queen's Club
- Dates: May 18–23
- Competitors: 11 from 2 nations

Medalists
1st place, gold medalist(s)		Jay Gould II	United States
2nd place, silver medalist(s)		Eustace Miles	Great Britain
3rd place, bronze medalist(s)		Neville Bulwer-Lytton	Great Britain

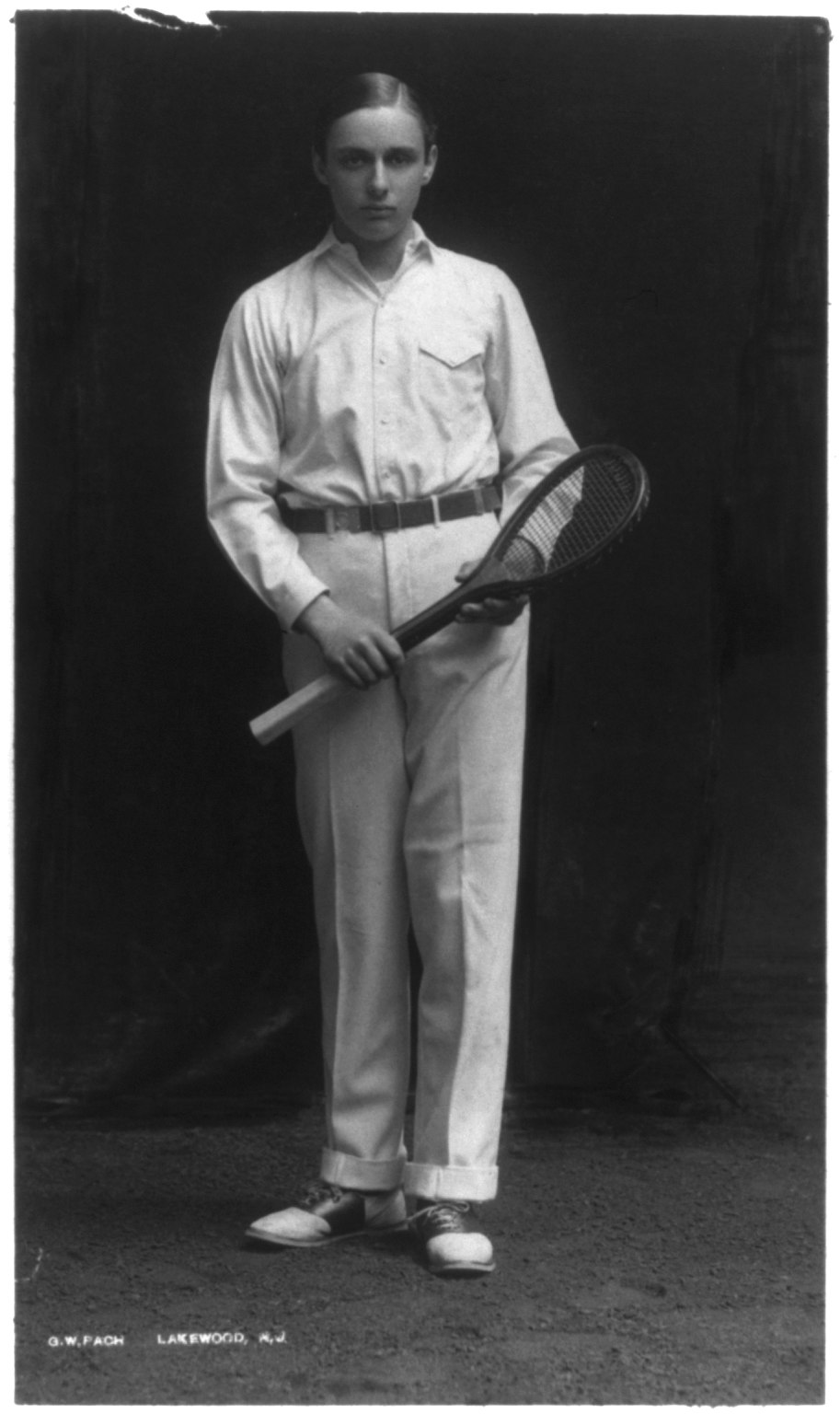
Gold medallist Jay Gould II, pictured in 1905 with racket.

Jeu de paume was an event contested at the 1908 Summer Olympics, the only time the Summer Olympic Games featured the sport as a medal event.

In the Official Report of the 1908 Olympic Games, the sport is referred to as "Tennis (jeu de paume)", while tennis is referred to as "lawn tennis". The competition venue was the Queen's Club in West Kensington, London.

An outdoor version called longue paume was played at the 1900 Summer Olympics, though its medal status is disputed. Jeu de paume is sometimes referred to as being an exhibition sport at the 1924 Summer Olympics, though this is unclear, as the French Federation of Longue Paume held its national longue paume championships during the Olympics.

== Participating nations ==
Each nation could enter up to 12 players. 11 players from 2 nations competed.

- Great Britain (9)
- United States (2)

== Medal table ==
Rank	Nation	Gold	Silver	Bronze	Total
1	United States	1	0	0	1
2	Great Britain	0	1	1	2
Totals (2 entries)		1	1	1	3

== Results ==
=== Bracket ===
First round
Gould (USA)
bye
Pennell (GBR)	6	6	6
Cazalet (GBR)	1	4	1
Page (GBR)
bye
Palmer (GBR)
bye
Miles (GBR)	6	6	6
Sands (USA)	3	3	3
Noel (GBR)	6	6	6
Tatham (GBR)	2	3	3
Lytton (GBR)
bye
Biedermann (GBR)
bye

Quarterfinals
Gould (USA)	6	6	6
Pennell (GBR)	3	3	2
Page (GBR)	5	6	6	6
Palmer (GBR)	6	4	5	1
Miles (GBR)	6	6	6
Noel (GBR)	5	1	5
Lytton (GBR)	6	6	6
Biedermann (GBR)	5	1	2

Semifinals
Gould (USA)	6	6	6
Page (GBR)	1	0	0
Miles (GBR)	6	6	6
Lytton (GBR)	4	1	3

Final
Gould (USA)	6	6	6
Miles (GBR)	5	4	4
Bronze medal match
Lytton (GBR)	6	6	6
Page (GBR)	2	4	4
