= Ross Canyon =

Undersea canyon named in association with the Ross Sea

Ross Canyon (75°0′S 163°0′W) is an undersea canyon named in association with Ross Sea. Name approved 6/88 (ACUF 228).
