= North American Racquets Association =

The North American Racquets Association is the governing body for the sport of racquets in the United States and Canada.

== Member clubs ==
- Tennis and Racquet Club (Boston)
- Racquet Club of Chicago
- Detroit Racquet Club
- Montreal Racket Club
- Racquet Club of Philadelphia
- Racquet and Tennis Club (New York City)
- Tuxedo Club
