= 1924 Dover by-election =

UK parliamentary by-election

The 1924 Dover by-election was held on 12 March 1924, but only one candidate, the incumbent Conservative MP, John Jacob Astor, was nominated and so was returned unopposed.

Astor had been most recently elected to the House of Commons of the United Kingdom in the general election on 6 December 1923 but had not yet taken the oath of allegiance, required by the Parliamentary Oaths Act 1866 to be taken after each election. Speaking or voting in the House before taking the oath meant that not only would the Member be fined £500, their seat would also be vacated "as if he were dead", so prompting a by-election. On 4 March, as Astor explained in a letter to his local newspaper, he inadvertently walked through the division lobby to vote whilst engaged in conversation with fellow MPs. Accordingly, the Speaker issued a warrant for a writ for a new election on 6 March.

The by-election was held on 12 March as only one candidate, Astor, was nominated. Astor took the oath the next day. This was the most recent time a by-election has been caused by a Member speaking or voting before taking the oath.
