= Mawson Bank =

- Submerged bank Mawson Bank (Antarctica)
- Interactive map of Mawson Bank
- Ocean: Southern Ocean

Mawson Bank (73°30′S 174°0′E) is a submarine bank in the Ross Sea off Antarctica named for British Antarctic scientist Sir Douglas Mawson. The name was approved by the Advisory Committee for Undersea Features in June 1988.
