= Hallett Ridge =

Hallett Ridge (71°15′S 176°50′E) is an undersea ridge in the Ross Sea, off the coast of Antarctica. The name, approved by the Advisory Committee for Undersea Features in September 1997, was proposed by Dr. Steven C. Cande of the Scripps Institution of Oceanography, in association with Cape Hallett and Hallett Peninsula.
