= Vane Pennell =

British real tennis player

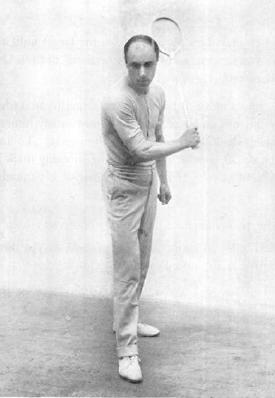
- Pennell in 1908

Personal information
- Full name: Vane Hungerford Pennell
- Born: 16 August 1876 Kensington, Greater London
- Died: 17 June 1938 (aged 61) Boscombe, Bournemouth
Medal record
Men's Rackets
Representing Great Britain
Olympic Games
Gold medal – first place	1908 London	Men's doubles

Vane Hungerford Pennell (16 August 1876 – 17 June 1938) was an English rackets and real tennis (jeu de paume) player who competed in the 1908 Summer Olympics for Great Britain.

== Life ==
Vane Pennell was educated at Eton, Charterhouse and Trinity College, Cambridge. He won the 1904 amateur tennis championship and the 1907 gold prize at Lords. In the 1908 Olympics he won the gold medal in the men's doubles competition together with John Jacob Astor. In the men's singles event he lost his first match.

He also competed in the Olympic jeu de paume tournament but was eliminated in the quarter-finals.
