= Captain Abby and Captain John =

1939 book by Robert Peter Tristram Coffin

- Author: Robert Peter Tristram Coffin
- Publisher: Macmillan Press
- Publication date: 1939

Captain Abby and Captain John, or Captain Abby and Captain John: An Around-the-world Biography is a book written by Pulitzer Prize-winning author Robert Peter Tristram Coffin (1892–1955). The book was written in 1939, and was published by Macmillan Press. It chronicles the true life adventures of a husband and wife team that co-captained a tall ship in the heyday of wooden shipping in the 19th century. The couple at the heart of the story are John and Abby Pennell, part of the Pennell shipbuilding dynasty of Brunswick, Maine, U.S. The family company was known as Pennell Brothers, and was a successful shipbuilding company of the American wooden shipbuilding era. The book follows the couple and their real life drama as they sail the world's oceans.

The material that the book is based on are the real life diaries, letters, and papers of the couple. Coffin used these materials for his research, provided by the couple's son, John Frederick Pennell.
