= James Pennell Mansion =

Coordinates: 43°51′31″N 69°57′35″W

James Pennell House

The James Pennell Mansion is a mansion that stands at 257 Pennellville Road in the Pennellville Historic District in Brunswick, Maine.

== Construction ==
The mansion was completed in 1838. The house was built by Master Ship Builder James Pennell. He employed the workers from the Pennell Brothers shipyard, and began construction on it in 1837. The James Pennell Mansion is located at the former Pennellville shipyard.
