= Francis Erwood =

Frank Erwood
- Full name: Francis Elliston Erwood
- Country (sports): England
- Born: March 17, 1824 Doctors' Commons, London
- Died: October 7, 1878 (aged 54) Woolwich, London
- Career record: Guinness Book of Records

Francis Elliston Erwood (1824–1878) was designated in the Guinness Book of Records the first closed court Rackets world champion. The title, together with a £400 prize, was gained following two matches in 1860, the first at the Royal Artillery Court, Woolwich and the second at the Eglintoun Arms, Maudlin Street, Bristol when Erwood twice defeated open court champion professional John Charles Mitchell (1823–61). The title passed to amateur/gentleman player William Hart-Dyke in 1862 after another two-match duel, when the prize money was only £100.

== Life ==
Frank Erwood was born on 17 March 1824 at Doctors' Commons in London, the son of George Erwood, a baker and biscuit maker, and his wife Frances (born Elliston). He was a racquet and ball maker as well as professional player and instructor to army officers in Woolwich. His older brother, George Erwood, was of a similar mould and in 1860 was the new racket master at Hampstead. About 1863 Frank's left eye was damaged whilst playing and was he obliged to end his career.

Marrying in 1855, Frank had four children, the daughters of whom emigrated to Canada and the USA; his son followed him into the business of racquet and ball making. His wife dying in 1870, Frank followed her on 7 October 1878 at Woolwich.

Frank's winning racquet was for many years kept by one of his descendants, but it is now believed to reside at one of the squash clubs in Bromley, Kent.

== References & Notes ==
Notes

References

- Bell's Life in London & Sporting Chronicle. March 11 – April 1, 1860.
- Guinness Book of Records (old editions)
- Lord Aberdare. The Willis Faber Book of Tennis & Rackets.
- UK Census returns
- Records of the Registrar of Births, Deaths, & Marriages.
