= Peter Latham (tennis) =

British racquets and real tennis player

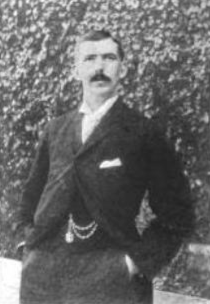
- In The Sketch, 26 October 1898
- Born: Peter Walker Latham; 10 May 1865; Manchester, England
- Died: 22 November 1953 (aged 88); Chiswick, England
- Occupations: Racquets, real tennis player
- Spouse: Annie Sarah Carpenter (m. 1888)
- Children: 5

Peter Walker Latham (1865–1953) was a British racquets and real tennis player.

== Biography ==
Peter Latham was born in Manchester on 10 May 1865. He married Annie Sarah Carpenter in 1888, and they had five children.

Latham was the world champion of rackets from 1887–1902, and was also the world champion of real tennis from 1895–1905 and from 1907–1908. He is the only person to hold both titles simultaneously (which he did in 1895–1902) as of 2024.

He died at his home in Chiswick on 22 November 1953.

== See also ==
- Real tennis world champions
- Rackets World Championships
