= Pennell Bank =

- Submerged bank Pennell Bank (Antarctica)
- Interactive map of Pennell Bank
- Ocean: Southern Ocean

Pennell Bank (74°30′S 179°59′E) is a northeast trending submarine bank on the continental shelf in the Ross Sea. Name approved 2/64 (ACUF 201).
