= Manchester Tennis and Racquet Club =

Sports club in Greater Manchester, England

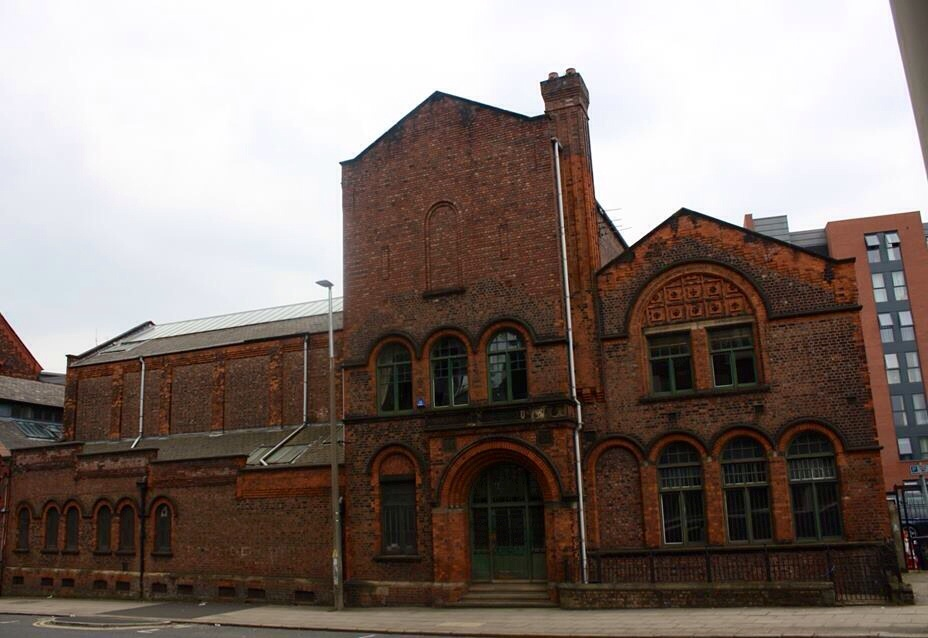
- Manchester Tennis and Racquet Club
- Interactive map of the Manchester Tennis and Racquet Club area

General information
- Location: Salford, Greater Manchester, United Kingdom, 33 Blackfriars Road, Salford; M3 7AQ
- Coordinates: 53.4859°N 2.2524°W
- Completed: 1880; 146 years ago
- Inaugurated: December 1880
- Renovated: 1925
- Owner: Manchester Tennis and Racquet Club

Design and construction
- Architect: George Tunstal Redmayne
- Designations

Listed Building – Grade II*
- Official name: Manchester Tennis and Racquet Club
- Designated: 21 January 1996
- Reference no.: 1386080

Website
- mtrc.co.uk

Manchester Tennis and Racquet Club is a sports club based in Salford, just outside Manchester, England. It is the oldest sports facility in Greater Manchester to have retained its use to the present day.

== History ==
The history of the club did not begin at these premises, however, but in Manchester at Miller Street in 1876. Due to the subsequent expansion of the railways in Manchester, it was relocated to its current location. The last major modification came in 1925 when a squash court was added to the facility.

On 21 January 1996, English Heritage awarded the building Grade II* status.

== See also ==
- Grade II* listed buildings in Greater Manchester
- Listed buildings in Salford, Greater Manchester
