= Rackets at the 1908 Summer Olympics =

Rackets at the Games of the IV Olympiad
- Venues: Queen's Club
- Dates: April 27–May 1
- Competitors: 7 from 1 nation

At the 1908 Summer Olympics, two rackets events were contested. Only British players participated in the competitions.

== Medal summary ==
| Event | Gold | Silver | Bronze |
|---|---|---|---|
| Men's singles | Evan Noel (GBR) | Henry Leaf (GBR) | John Jacob Astor (GBR) |
| Men's singles | Evan Noel (GBR) | Henry Leaf (GBR) | Henry Brougham (GBR) |
| Men's doubles | Vane Pennell and John Jacob Astor (GBR) | Edmund Bury and Cecil Browning (GBR) | Evan Noel and Henry Leaf (GBR) |

== Participating nations ==
A total of seven players from only one nation competed:

- Great Britain (7)

== Medal table ==
| Rank | Nation | Gold | Silver | Bronze | Total |
|---|---|---|---|---|---|
| 1 | Great Britain | 2 | 2 | 3 | 7 |
| Totals (1 entries) | | 2 | 2 | 3 | 7 |

== See also ==
- List of Olympic venues in discontinued events
