= Arthur Page (judge) =

British barrister and sportsman (1876–1958)

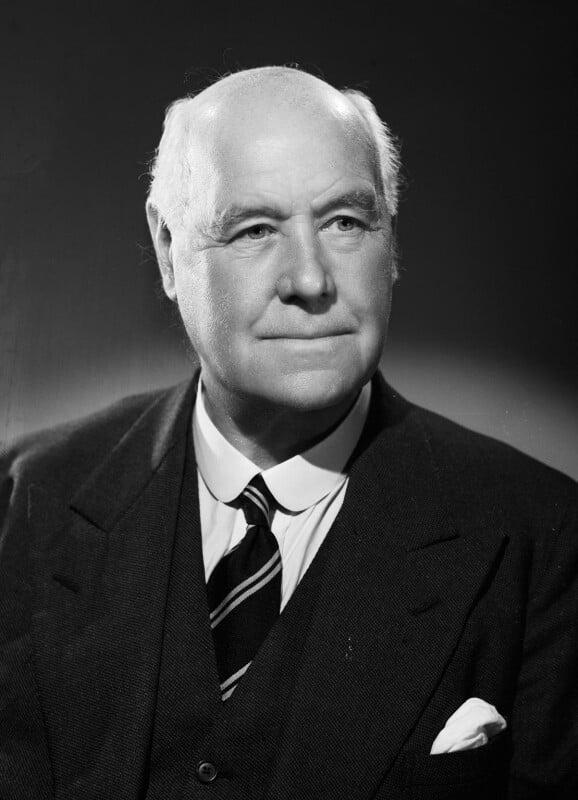
- Arthur Page in 1946.

Personal information
- Nationality: British
- Born: 9 March 1876 Westminster, England
- Died: 1 September 1958 (aged 82) Hildenborough, England

Sport
- Sport: Jeu de paume

Sir Arthur Page, QC (9 March 1876 – 1 September 1958) was a British barrister, judge, and jeu de paume (nowadays known as real tennis) player and cricketer who served as Chief Justice of the High Court of Judicature at Rangoon. He played jeu de paume at the 1908 Summer Olympics and was also a first-class cricketer.

He was a member of the Harrow School cricket team and played jeu de paume while attending Magdalen College, Oxford. A member of the Inner Temple, he was an attempted candidate in the 1910 United Kingdom general election for the Conservative Party in Derby. He served as a judge in Calcutta and Burma, where he was Chief Justice. He was appointed a KC in 1922.

During the Second World War, Page was Chairman of the Evidence Section, Blockade Intelligence, Ministry of Economic Warfare in 1939 and 1940 and Chairman of the North Staffordshire Regional Coal Valuation Board from 1941.

His son was the Conservative politician Sir John Page.
