= Ben Cawston =

American racquets player

Benjamin Richard Edwin "Ben" Cawston is a racquets player currently ranked number one in the world as of March 2022, along with champion of the world as of April 2023. Cawston also plays professional pickleball.

== Tournaments ==
Cawston is a two-time U.S. Open Singles Champion (2022, 2020). Cawston is the current Invitational Singles Champion (World's Top 8 players event), an event he also won in 2019. Cawston is the current holder of the Western Open Singles (Chicago) and the Manchester Gold Racket Singles and Doubles. He is the youngest player in history to be ranked number one in the world and also have a challenge for the world championship (November 2022).

At 18 years old, Cawston previously was the youngest player in history to win the British Amateur Singles Championship in 2017 and played at the Queens Club, a tournament dating back to 1888.

== Controversies ==
Educated at Westgate Comprehensive School in Winchester, Cawston became the first state-educated pupil to win a national public school title, winning the under-15 singles win at Queen's Club in 2014. Despite this, Cawston was not allowed to compete in the doubles tournament after professional players who were from private schools voted to exclude state school players.

David Makey, at the time chairman the Rackets Professionals Association (RPA), said of the exclusion: "The pros are very much divided regarding this issue, particularly as we trialled it with boys from Manchester, and debates at RPA meetings in recent years have become more tense and at times extremely unpleasant and uncomfortable." Some insiders believe the reason for the ban was that certain private school professional players feared that they might lose to Cawston and his doubles partner, Thomas Foster, and therefore did not want them to compete.
