= Robert P. T. Coffin =

American poet

Robert Coffin
- Born: Robert Peter Tristram Coffin; March 18, 1892; Harpswell, Maine
- Died: January 20, 1955 (aged 62); Harpswell, Maine
- Education: Bowdoin College (BA); Princeton University (MA); Trinity College, Oxford (DLitt)
- Occupation: Poet

Robert Peter Tristram Coffin (March 18, 1892 – January 20, 1955) was an American poet, educator, writer, editor and literary critic. Awarded the Pulitzer Prize for Poetry in 1936, he was the poetry editor for Yankee magazine.

== Early life ==
Born Robert Peter Coffin, the youngest of ten children to James William Coffin, a descendant of Tristram Coffin and Alice Mary Coombs on a saltwater farm on Sebascodegan Island he earned his undergraduate degree from Bowdoin College in 1913 and then his Masters of Arts from Princeton University in 1918. In 1922 Coffin was awarded the degree of Doctor of Literature by Trinity College, Oxford where he was a Rhodes Scholar. He won the Pulitzer Prize for Poetry in 1936.

== Career ==
Coffin served with the US Army in World War I. When he returned he taught English at Wells College and then as the Pierce Professor at Bowdoin College.

Modeled after his friend and fellow poet Robert Frost's Bread Loaf Writers' Conference, Coffin was the co-founder with Carroll Towle of the Writers' Conference of the University of New Hampshire in 1956.

Coffin also illustrated many of his books.

Coffin died of a heart attack in Harpswell, Maine, on January 20, 1955, at the age of 62. He is buried in the Cranberry Horn Cemetery in Harpswell.

== Partial bibliography ==
=== Non-fiction ===
- Book of Crowns and Cottages (Yale University Press, New Haven, 1925)
- Laud, Storm Center of Stuart England (1930)
- The Dukes of Buckingham, Playboys of the Stuart World (1931)
- Portrait of an American (The Macmillan Company, New York, 1931)
- Lost Paradise (Autobiography) (The Macmillan Co. New York, 1934)
- The Kennebec: Cradle of Americans (Farrar & Rinehart, 1937) (First volume in the Rivers of America Series)
- Maine Ballads (The Macmillan Co., New York 1938)
- Captain Abby and Captain John, an Around-the-World Biography (The Macmillan Company, New York, 1939).
- Primer for America (1943)
- Mainstays of Maine (The Macmillan Co., New York, 1944)
- Maine Doings (Bobbs-Merrill, New York, 1950)

=== Fiction and poetry ===
- Christchurch (Thomas Seltzer, New York, 1924)
- Dew and Bronze (Albert & Charles Boni, 1927)
- Golden Falcon (The Macmillan Co., New York, 1929)
- The Yoke of Thunder (The Macmillan Co., New York, 1932)
- Ballads of Square-Toed Americans (The Macmillan Co., New York, 1933)
- Strange Holiness (1935)
- Red Sky in the Morning (The Macmillan Co., New York, 1935)
- John Dawn (1936)
- Saltwater Farm. J. J. Lankes (illustration). (The Macmillan Co., New York, 1937.)
- Thomas-Thomas-Ancil-Thomas (1941)
- Book of Uncles (The Macmillan Co., New York, 1942)
- Poems for a Son with Wings (1945)
- People Behave Like Ballads (1946)
- Yankee Coast (1947)
- One Horse Farm (The Macmillan Company, New York, 1949)
- Apples by Ocean (The Macmillan Company, New York, 1950)
- On the Green Carpet (1951)

== Sources ==
- Annie Coffin Sanborn (1963). The life of Robert Peter Tristram Coffin and family. University of Michigan.
