= Rackets (sport) =

Indoor racquet sport

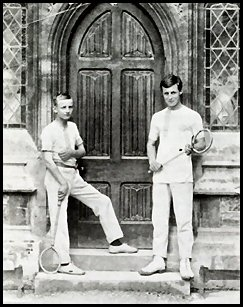
R. P. Keigwin (right) with AEJ Collins the college's rackets team at Clifton College c. 1902

Rackets or racquets is an indoor racket sport played in the United Kingdom, United States, and Canada. It is infrequently called "hard rackets" to distinguish it from the related sport of squash (also called "squash rackets").

== History ==
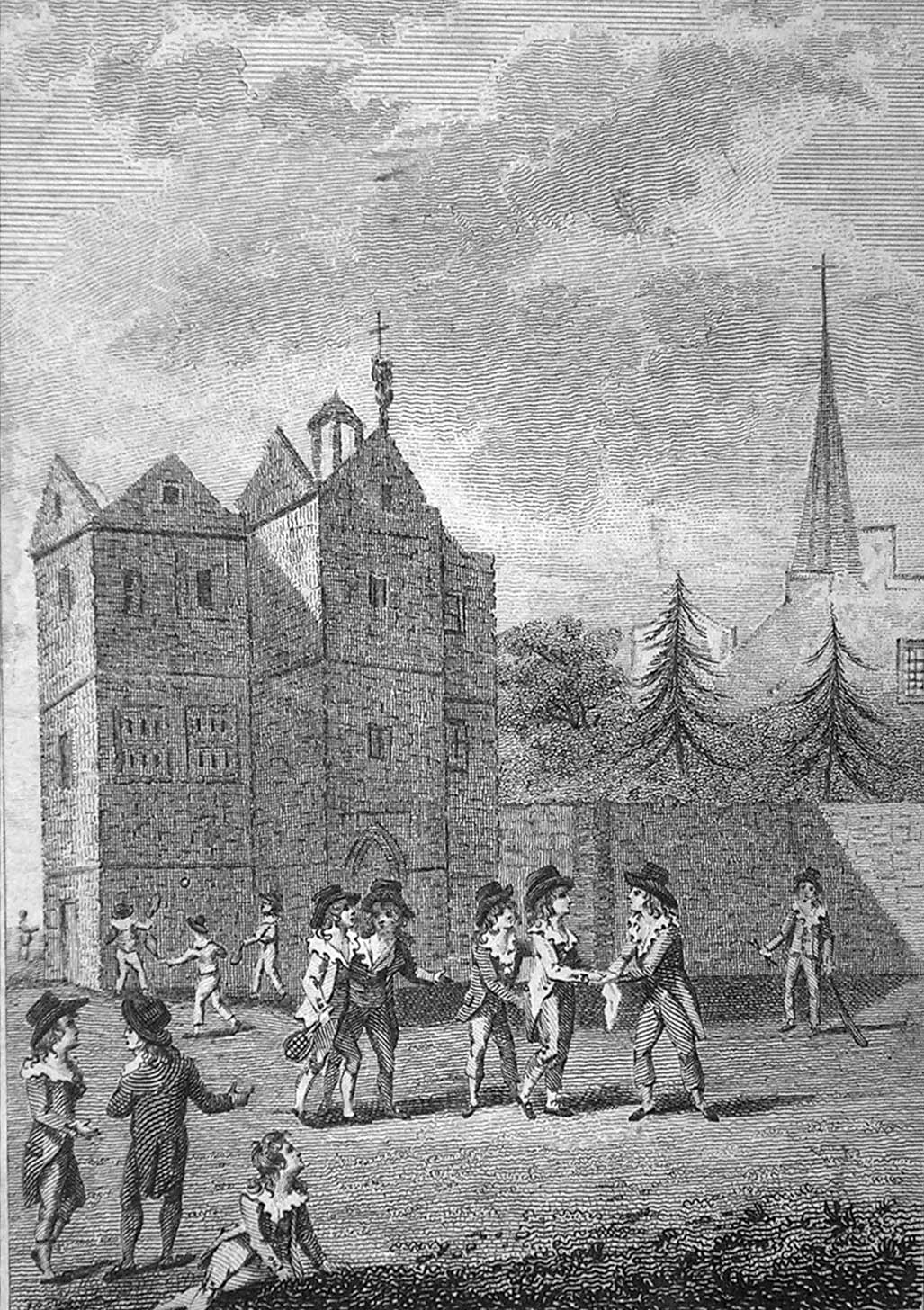
Boys hitting up outside the Harrow Old School, c. 1795

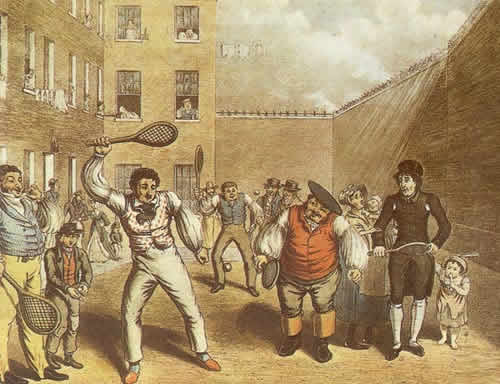
A Toff playing with the rabble in prison

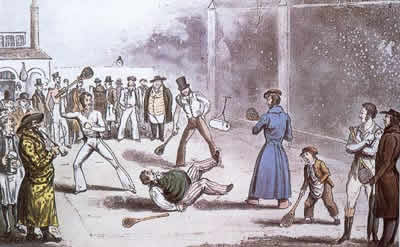
Rackets being played at a prison—where the game developed

Historians generally assert that rackets began as an 18th-century pastime in London's King's Bench and Fleet debtors' prisons. The prisoners modified the game of fives (in the process creating Bat Fives) by using tennis rackets to speed up the action. They played against the prison wall, sometimes at a corner to add a sidewall to the game. Rackets then became popular outside the prison, played in alleys behind pubs. It spread to schools, first using school walls, and later with proper four-wall courts being specially constructed for the game. The lithograph at right dating from 1795 shows schoolboys 'hitting up' outside the Harrow School 'Old School' buildings.

Eglinton Castle in Scotland, now largely demolished, had a "Racket Hall" which is first shown on the 1860 OS map, but estate records show that it was built shortly after 1839, the first recorded match being in 1846. The floor is of large granite slabs, now hidden by the wooden floor. It is the very first covered racket court and is now the oldest surviving court in the world, as well as being the oldest indoor sports building in Scotland. It has been restored as a racket hall, but used as an exhibition area. Some private clubs also built courts. Along with real tennis and badminton, rackets was used as an inspiration for the game of lawn tennis, which Walter Clopton Wingfield claimed he invented in 1873, but this was not so, as others had been playing lawn tennis since as early as 1859, including J.B. Perera and Harry Gem. Wingfield did obtain a patent on his proposed peculiarly-shaped "hourglass" lawn tennis court in 1874, but it lasted in use no more than a year before it was shelved by the Marylebone Cricket Club's 1875 official rules mandating the rectangular court in use both before and after Wingfield's hourglass court. A vacant rackets court built into the University of Chicago's Stagg Field served as the location of the first artificial nuclear chain reaction on December 2, 1942. The Stagg Field court is often mistakenly identified as having been a "squash rackets" court. Rackets was part of the 1908 Summer Olympics program and was played at the Prince's Club in London; the winner was Evan Noel.

After the second world war rackets saw a drop in popularity resulting in the closure of some courts and others suffering from a lack of maintenance. Dick Bridgeman, an advocate for the sport (and later a British Doubles Champion) established what was then the Dick Bridgeman Tennis and Rackets Foundation. The foundation sought donations to support young professionals thereby ensuring the future of the game. Now known as simply The Tennis and Racquets Foundation, it continues to raise money for young professionals raising the profile of rackets worldwide.

The Book of Racquets was published by J. R. Atkins in 1872. It was reprinted to commemorate the 1981 World Rackets Challenge Match between W. J. C. Surtees and J. A. N. Prenn as a limited edition of 250 copies.

== Manner of play ==
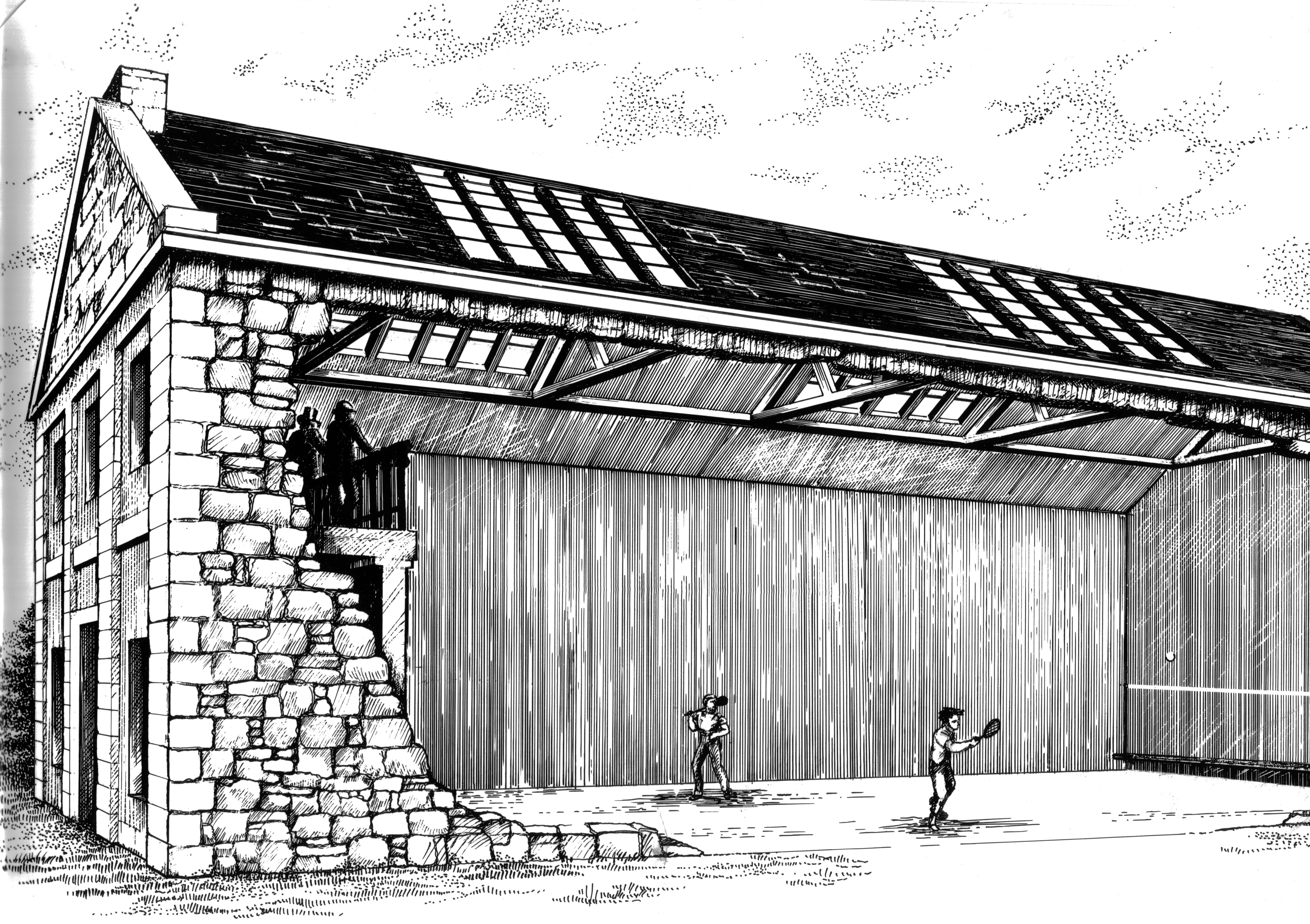
The Rackets Hall built by the 13th Earl of Eglinton.

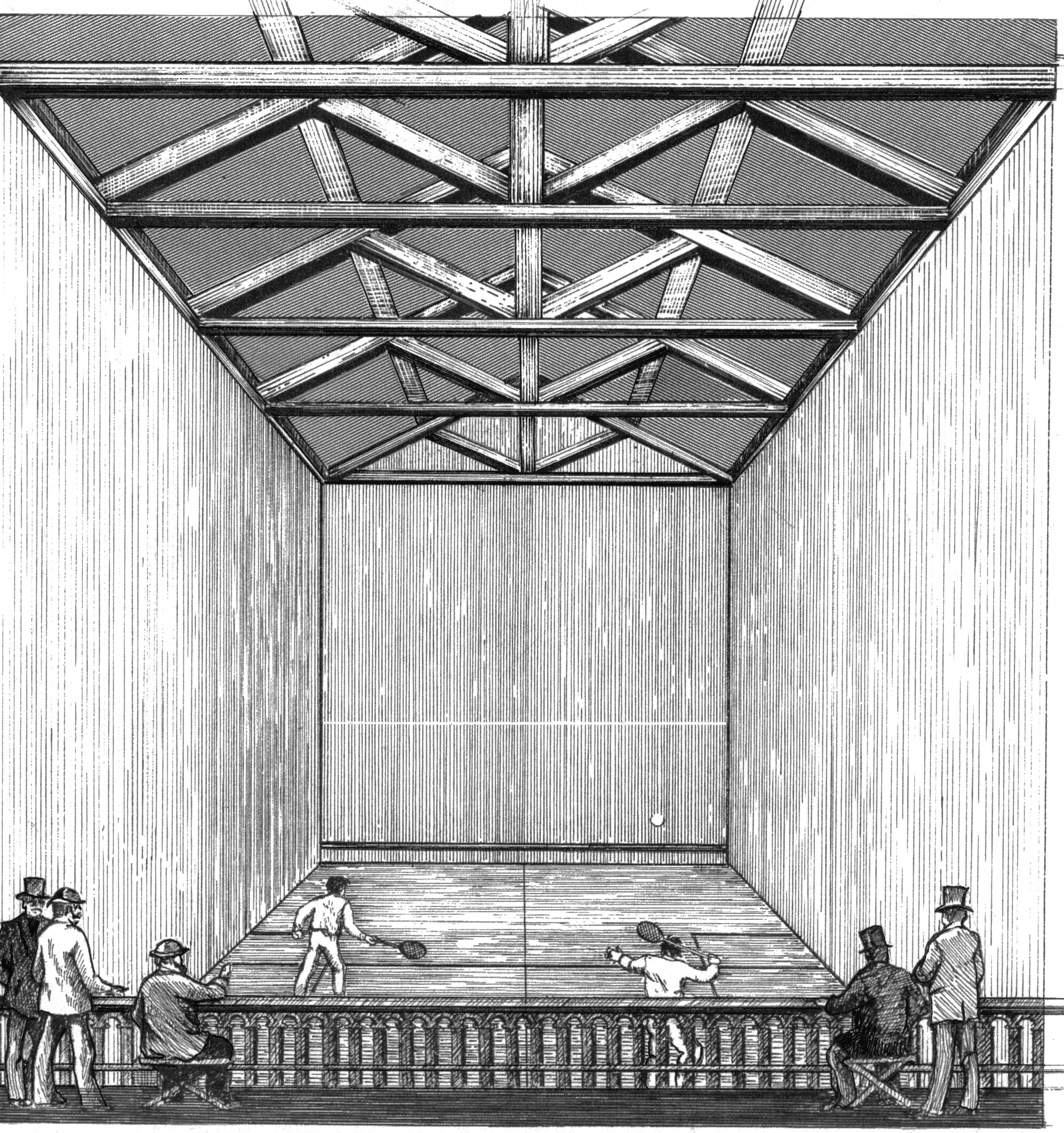
Interior of the Eglinton Castle Rackets Hall in 1842.

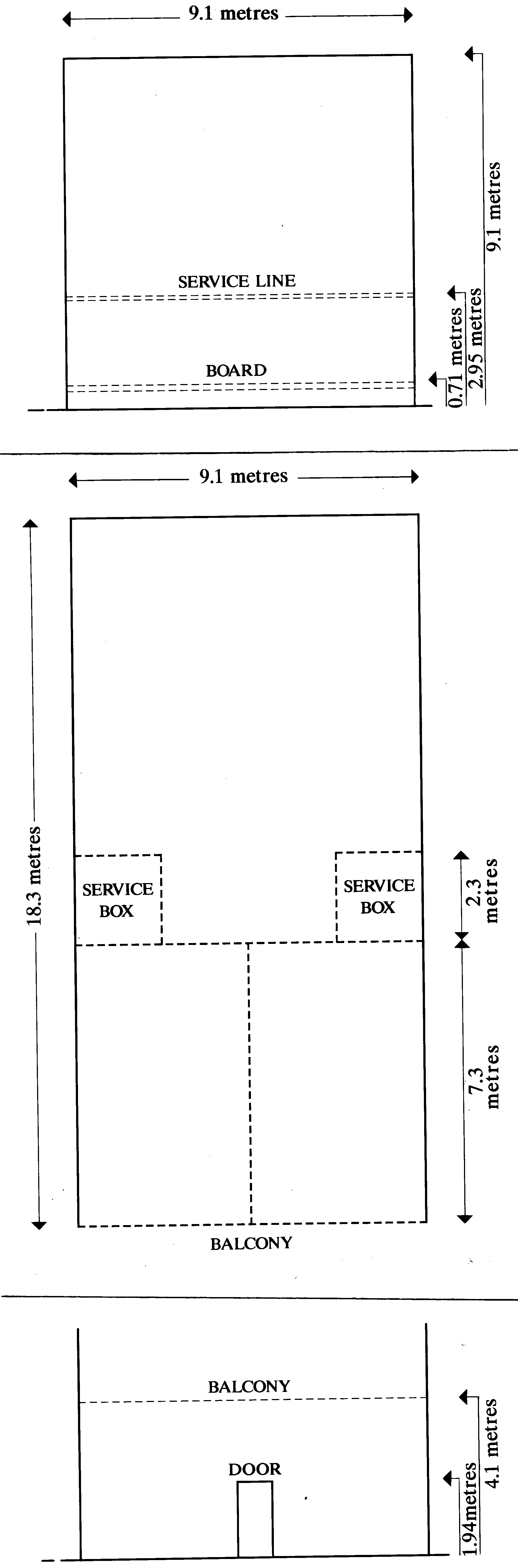
A racket court layout

Rackets is played in a 30-by-60-foot (9.1 by 18.3 m) enclosed court, with a ceiling at least 30 feet (9.1 m) high. Modern rackets are 70 cm long, with a maximum strung area of 500 square centimetres (approximately 75 square inches) and a mass between 90 and 200 grams (4–7 ounces). Singles and doubles are played on the same court. The walls and floor of the court are made of smooth stone or concrete and are generally dark in colour to contrast with the white ball. A player uses a 30.5-inch (77 cm) wooden racket, known as a bat, to hit a 1½-inch (38 mm) hard white ball weighing 1 ounce (28 g). As of September 2018, two companies produce rackets racquets, Grays of Cambridge (UK) and Gold Leaf Athletics (US).

A good stroke must touch the front wall above a 26.5 inches (67 cm) high wooden (often cloth-covered) board (also known as the 'telltale') before touching the floor. The ball may touch the side walls before reaching the front wall. The player returning a good stroke may play the ball on the volley, or after one bounce on the floor. The play is fast, and potentially dangerous. Lets (replayed points) are common, as the striker should not play the ball if doing so risks hitting another player with it. Matches are preferably observed by a "marker", who has the duty to call "Play" after each good stroke to denote that the ball is "up". Games are to 15 points, unless the game is tied at 13–all or 14–all, in which case the game can be "set" to 16 or 18 (in the case of 13–all) or to 15 or 17 (in the case of 14–all) at the option of the player first reaching 13 or 14. Only the server (hand-in) can score—the receiver (hand-out) who wins a rally becomes the server. Return of service can be extremely difficult, and, in North America, only one serve is allowed. Matches are typically best of five games.

The main shots played are the volley, forehand and the backhand, all similar to the way one plays these in squash; because the game of squash rackets (now known as "squash") began in the 19th century as an offshoot of rackets, the sports were similar in manner of play and rules. However, the rules and scoring in squash have evolved in the last hundred years or so. Rackets has changed little; the main difference today is that players are now allowed brief rest periods between games. In the past, leaving the court could mean forfeiting the match, so players kept spare rackets, shirts, and shoes in the gutter below the telltale on the front wall. The governing bodies are the Tennis and Rackets Association (UK) and the North American Racquets Association.

== Court locations ==
List of courts in the United Kingdom

=== United Kingdom ===
As of March 2021, there are 28 courts across fourteen major public schools, two armed forces locations, and three private clubs in the United Kingdom.

==== Schools ====
===== Two court venues =====
- Charterhouse School
- Eton College
- Harrow School, courts rebuilt 2019
- Malvern College
- Marlborough College
- Rugby School
- Tonbridge School
- Winchester College

===== One court venues =====
- Cheltenham College
- Clifton College
- Haileybury
- Radley College
- St Paul's School (London)
- Wellington College

==== Armed Forces ====
Both are one-court venues for use by members of the UK Armed Forces.

- BRNC Dartmouth
- RMA Sandhurst

==== Clubs ====
The number of courts at each club appear in parentheses.

- Seacourt Rackets Club, Hayling Island (1)
- Manchester Tennis and Racquet Club (1)
- Queens Club, London (2), hosted 1908 Olympic competitions

=== North America ===
List of courts overseas (all are North American) As of August 2021, there are eight active courts in seven private clubs in North America:

==== Two court venues ====
- Racquet Club of Chicago, Chicago, Illinois

==== One court venues ====
- Boston Tennis and Racquet Club, Boston, Massachusetts
- Detroit Racquet Club, Detroit, Michigan
- Montreal Rackets Club, Montreal, Canada
- The New York Racquet and Tennis Club, New York, New York, male-only club
- The Racquet Club of Philadelphia, Philadelphia, Pennsylvania
- Tuxedo Park, NY, court is part of a large private gated community

== Tournaments ==
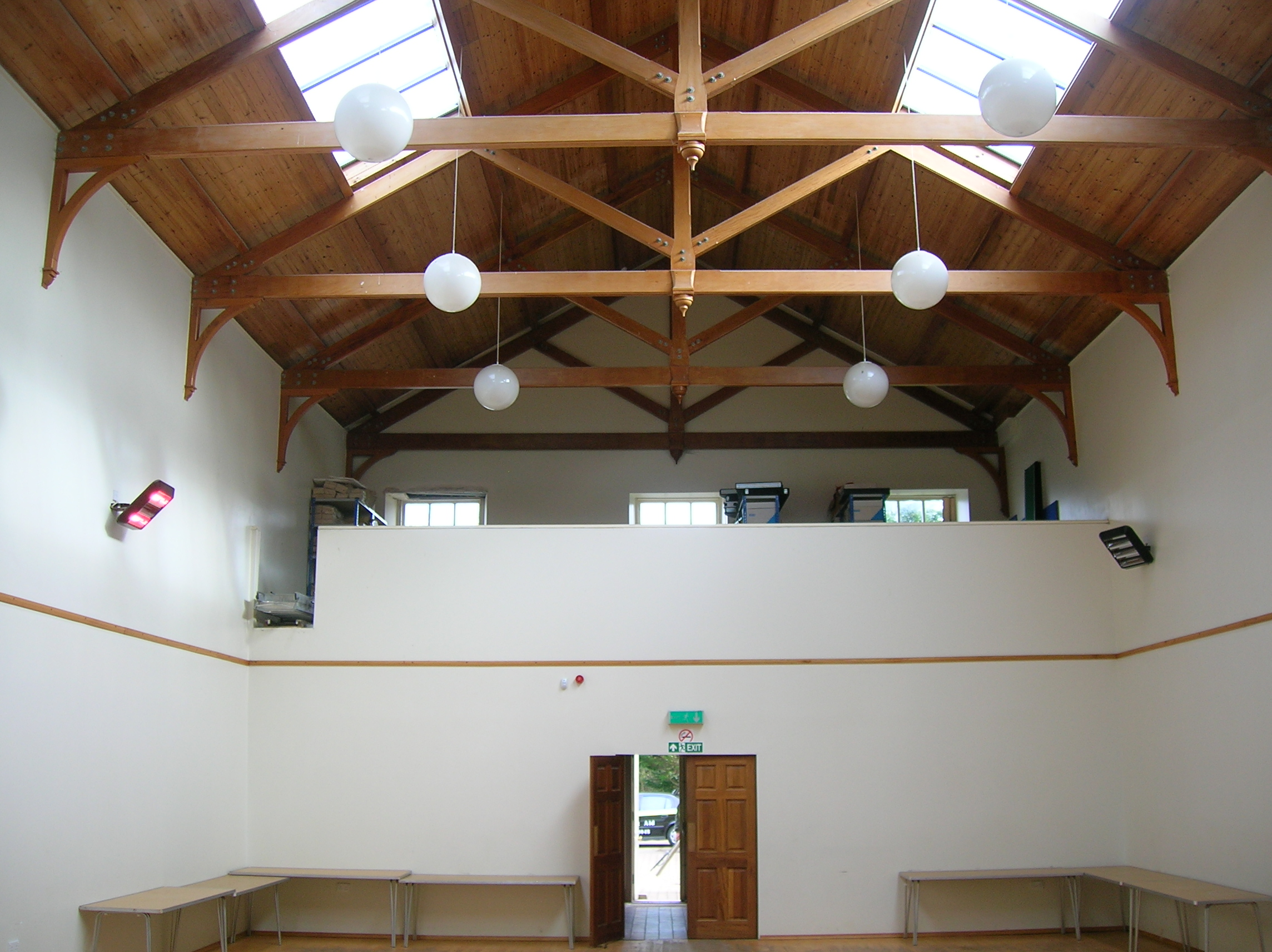
The entrance and viewing balcony at the Eglinton Racket Court.

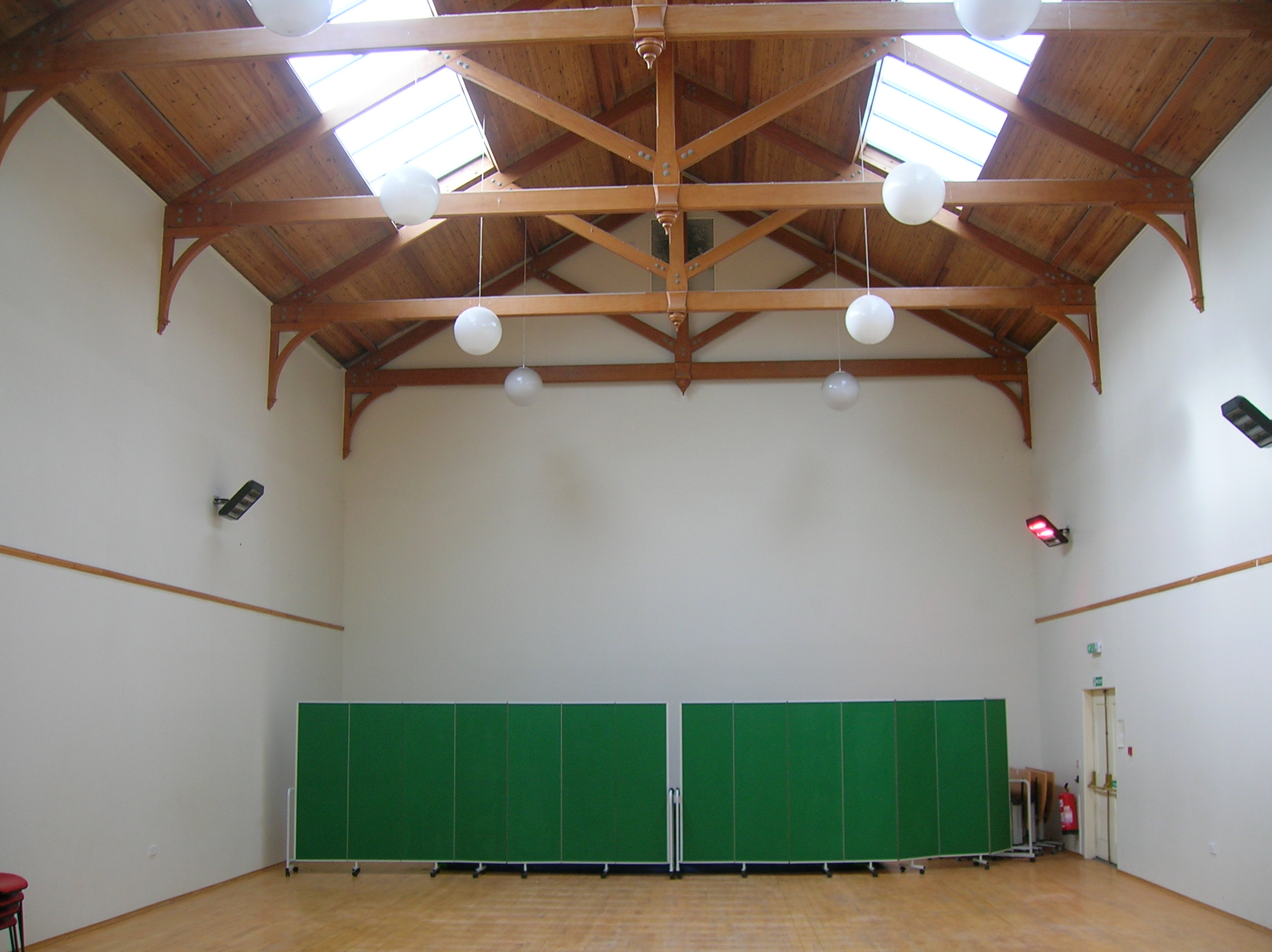
The old court at Eglinton Castle.

The Rackets World Championships for singles (and doubles) is decided in a challenge format. If the governing bodies accept the challenger's qualifications, he plays the reigning champion in a best of 14 games format (best of seven games on each side of the Atlantic). If each player wins seven games, the total point score is used as a tie breaker. The current singles champion is Tom Billings who defeated Alex Duncliffe-Vines in 2019. There will be another Challenge in November 2022 between Billings and the current World number 1 Ben Cawston.

The current Doubles world champions are Tom Billings and Richard Owen who defeated James Stout and Jonathan Larken in 2021, 5-1 at Queen’s and New York. In 2016 James Stout & Jonathan Larken, beat World Title holders, Alex Titchener-Barrett and Christian Portz in a two-legged challenge in November 2016. The first leg was played in London's Queen's Club, and was won by the challengers 4 games to 1. The second occurred in The New York Racquet's and Tennis Club, and was also won by the challengers 2 games to 1, reaching a two match aggregate of six games.

There are various tournaments that are hosted in North America and the UK.

These are:

In North America

- The Canadian Amateur Championships
- The US Amateur Championships
- The US Open
- The Western Open
- The Tuxedo Gold Rackets
- The North American Invitational Singles

In the UK

- The British Amateur Singles
- The British Amateur Doubles
- The British Open Singles
- The British Open Doubles (Separate tournament from Singles, played at a different time of year)
- The Invitational Singles
- The Manchester Gold Racket
- The National Schools Championship - Contested by players still at school in two tournaments, across 3 age groups, Singles and Doubles, both held at Queen's Club.
- The National Schools Girls Championship - Contested by players still at school in two tournaments, across 2 age groups, Singles and Doubles, both held at Queen's Club.

== World champions ==
Organised on a challenge basis, the first champion in 1820 was Robert Mackay of England. All championships were closed court, except for an open court series, in 1860.

- 1820–1824 (England) Robert Mackay
- 1825–1834 (England) Thomas Pittman
- 1834–1838 (England) John Pittman
- 1838–1840 (England) John Lamb
- 1846–1860 (England) John Charles Mitchell
- 1860–1862 (England) Francis Erwood
- 1862–1863 (England) William Hart-Dyke
- 1863–1866 (England) Henry John Gray
- 1866–1875 (England) William Gray
- 1876–1878 (England) Henry B Fairs
- 1878–1887 (England) Joseph Gray
- 1887–1902 (England) Peter Latham
- 1903–1911 (British Raj) Jamsetji Merwanji
- 1911–1913 (England) Charles Williams
- 1913–1929 (United States) Jock Soutar
- 1929–1935 (England) Charles Williams
- 1937–1947 (England) David S Milford
- 1947–1954 (England) James Dear
- 1954–1972 (England) Geoffrey Atkins
- 1972–1973 (United States) William Surtees
- 1973–1975 (England) Howard Angus MBE
- 1975–1981 (United States) William Surtees
- 1981–1984 (England) John Prenn
- 1984–1986 (England) William Boone
- 1986–1988 (England) John Prenn
- 1988–1999 (England) James Male
- 1999–2001 (England) Neil Smith
- 2001–2005 (England) James Male (retired)
- 2005–2008 (England) Harry Foster
- 2008–2019 (Bermuda) James Stout (retired)
- 2019–2023 (England) Tom Billings
- 2023-present (England) Ben Cawston
