= Football in Sussex =

History of football from 1403

Football in Sussex is the sport of association football in relation to its participation and history within Sussex, England. Football is one of the most popular sports in Sussex with over 500 football clubs and 38,000 players in the county.

The game of football is first documented in Sussex in 1403 as medieval football. The modern game of football began with public schools. According to John Cairney, goalkeeping was first developed at Lancing College, which had originated its own code of football by 1856. The first goal in the FA Cup was scored by former Lancing College student Jarvis Kenrick in 1871. In the next decade, the Sussex FA was founded in 1882, with the Sussex Senior Cup beginning almost immediately in the 1882–83 season. Leagues began shortly afterwards, including the West Sussex Football League in 1895 and the East Sussex Football League in 1896. The Sussex County Football League was created in 1920.

As winners of the Southern League in 1909–10, Brighton and Hove Albion played the winners of the Football League in the 1910 FA Charity Shield. Albion won the match and were dubbed 'Champions of England'. Brighton joined the Football League in 1920; it was not until almost a century later that Sussex gained a second team in the Football League when Crawley Town gained promotion in 2011. In 2017 Lewes became the world's first professional or semi-professional football club to pay women and men equally. In the same season Brighton & Hove Albion became Sussex's first full-time professional women's team and for the first time won promotion to the FA Women's Super League, the top tier of women's football.

The largest football stadium in the county, Falmer Stadium has been used for to host men's friendly and women's international football matches, and was a host stadium for the UEFA Women's Euro 2022 competition.

== History ==
=== Medieval football ===
There is a long tradition of football matches taking place in Sussex although the game was different from the modern codes of association football and rugby football. Two references to medieval football matches come from Sussex in 1403 and 1404 at Selmeston and Chidham that took place as part of baptisms. On each occasion one of the players broke his leg.

=== Development through public schools ===
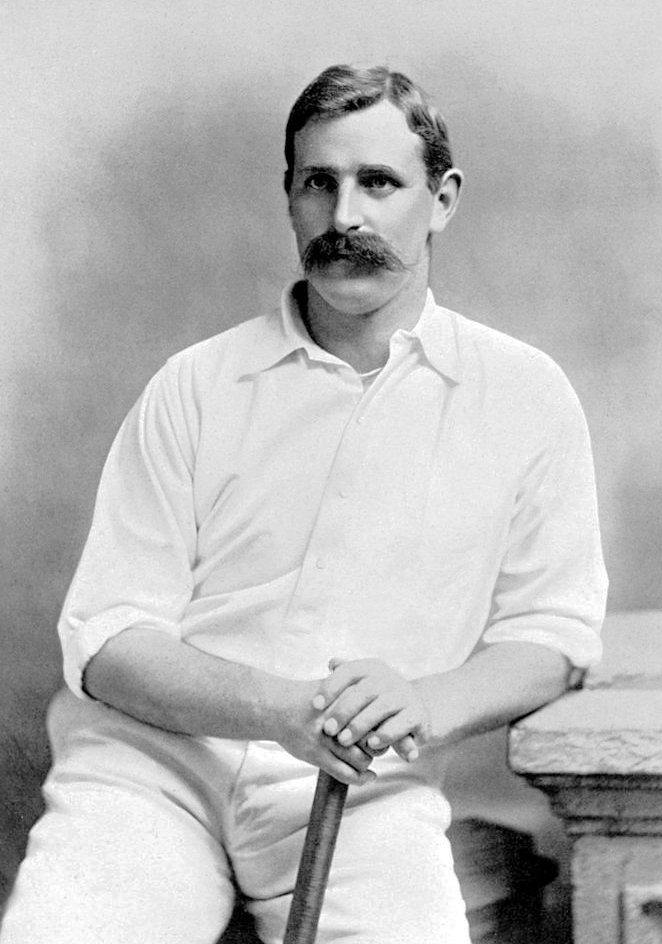
Like many Sussex players of the era, George Brann began his football career at public school; he went on to play for England between 1886 and 1891 and also played cricket for Sussex.

Led by the teachers, Lancing College created its own code of football in 1856, although it may have existed before this date as many football codifications at this time were the formal recording of older practices. Seen as a means of fostering teamwork, the code had 12-a-side teams. A football match from 1860 involving Lancing College was recorded in the sporting newspaper Bell's Life in London. In 1865 a player of the Lancing rules game described a match as "not much of a game, rather an inchoate barging match". Lancing College introduced the position of goalkeeper, the only position that could use their hands. They were supported by two backs.

Football is reported as having been played at Brighton College by 1859. Brighton and Lancing Colleges are recorded as having played a football match in November 1860, the first by public schools in Sussex and the first in England outside of the initial seven major public schools. Brighton College are recorded as having played a Brighton schools team at football in 1861. It appears that the venture was not successful, largely because people outside the college had difficulty understanding the particular rules which varied from college to college. In 1865 Brighton College players were criticised in Bell's Life for practices including 'throat seizing' and 'shinning'. Brighton College responded to Bell's Life by saying they were also perfectly capable of playing association-based codes too, which they did when they played Lancing College, where the visitors would adopt the home side's code.

The rules followed by Brighton College were related to the rules of Rugby School. Brighton Football Club was founded in 1868 by former students of Brighton College. Brighton went on to follow the codes and laws of Rugby College and the Rugby Football Union which was set up in 1871. Hurstpierpoint College was also recorded as having played a form of rugby football by 1872.

Association rules were adopted at Lancing College by 1871 and at Brighton College by 1873. Former Lancing pupil Jarvis Kenrick went on to score the first goal ever to be scored in the FA Cup as well as winning the FA Cup three years running with London-based Wanderers F.C. Several Lancing players went on to play for Tyne AFC, the elite football club in England at the end of the 1870s.

=== Creation of the county football association and leagues ===
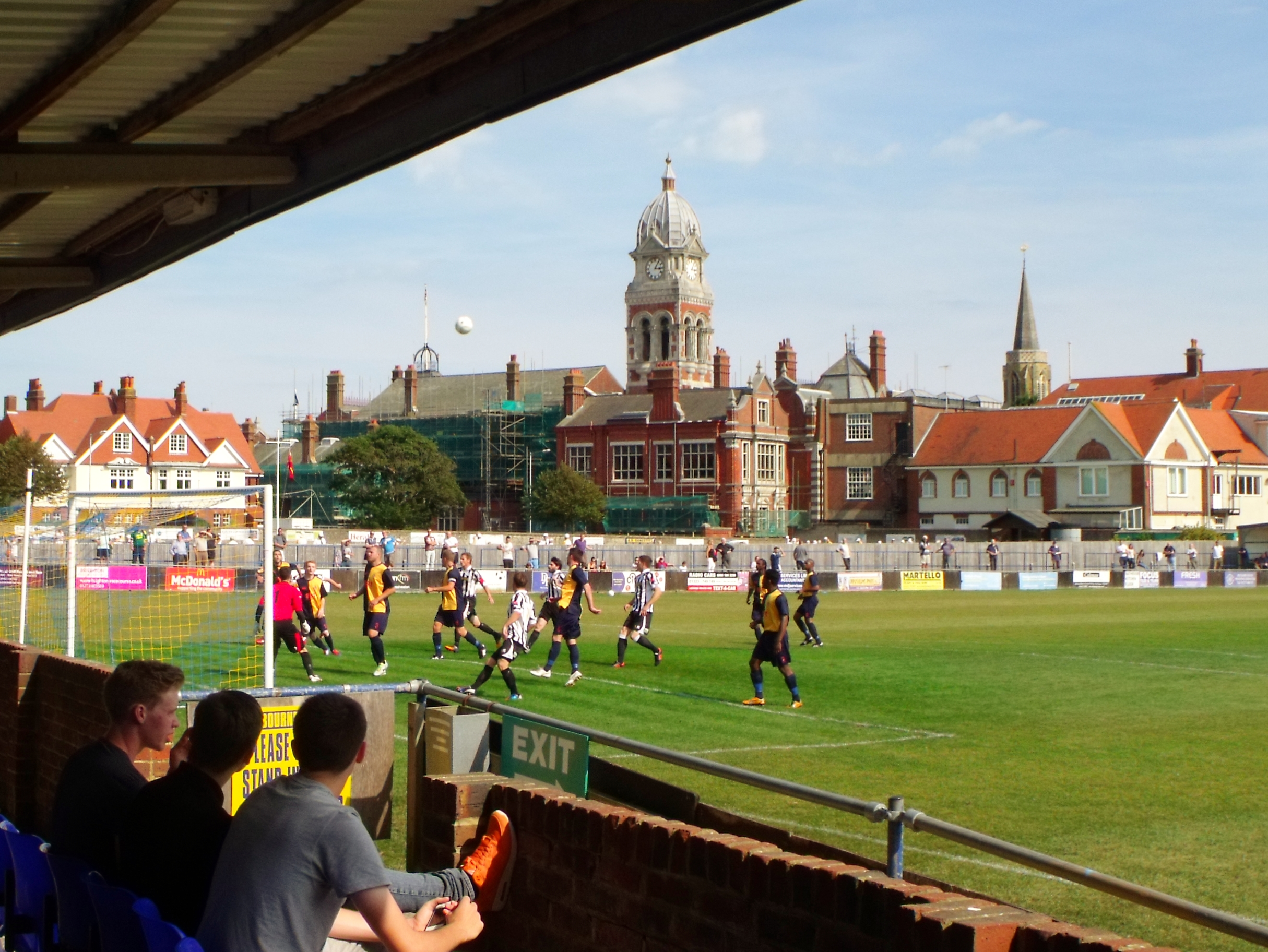
Founded in 1881 as Devonshire Park F.C., Eastbourne Town are the oldest extant club in Sussex and have played at The Saffrons since 1886

The first Horsham Football Club were founded in 1871 while the first Chichester Football Club were founded in 1873. Devonshire Park (now Eastbourne Town F.C.) were founded in 1881, the same year that Horsham F.C. were re-established. The Sussex County Football Association was created a year later in 1882. The Sussex County FA set up the Sussex Senior Challenge Cup almost immediately, from the 1882—83 season.

By the end of the 19th century the London, Brighton and South Coast Railway fielded six different teams in Sussex - Juniors, Locomotive, Rovers, Strugglers, Wanderers and Wasps.

Several local leagues were set up within Sussex at the end of the 19th century - the West Sussex Football League in 1895, the East Sussex Football League in 1896, the Hastings League in 1897 and the Horsham League in 1898. The Sussex County Football League was created in 1920.

The Sussex RUR Cup was set up as a new county football cup in 1896–97. The cup was known initially as the Sussex Royal Irish Rifles Cup after the 1st Battalion Royal Irish Rifles who were recognised as ‘Sussex Champions’ in 1895–96 having won the Sussex Senior Cup, Brighton Shield, Charity Cup and Vernon Wentworth Cup that season.

Professional sport developed more slowly in the south of England and initially The Football League was made up of clubs only from the north of England and the Midlands. The Southern League was formed in 1894 to provide the south of England with a professional league and in 1897 Brighton United were formed as Sussex's first professional club, joining the Southern League the following year. The club folded in 1900. The following year Brighton & Hove Albion were formed and joined the Southern League. Albion won the 1909-10 Southern Football League. As winners of the Southern League, Albion beat Aston Villa, the winners of the Football League in the 1910 FA Charity Shield. Albion were dubbed 'Champions of England' in what is to date the only national honour for a Sussex football club. It was around this time that Albion fans began to adopt Sussex by the Sea, Sussex's county anthem.

=== Wartime ===
During the Second World War the winners of the Sussex Wartime Cup were awarded the Sussex Senior Cup. The Sussex Wartime Cup took place on a league basis and a competition was held in every year during the Second World War except for 1940-41 when no competition for the Sussex Senior Cup was held.

=== Post-War period ===
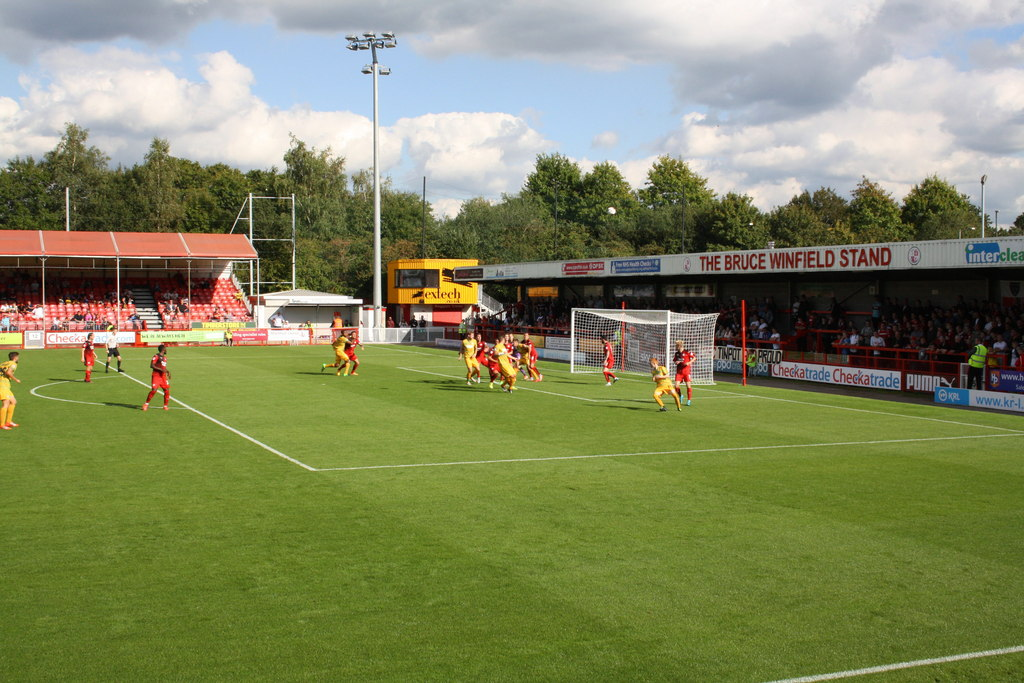
Crawley Town playing against Yeovil Town in September 2015. Crawley became the second team in Sussex to join the Football League in 2011

1979 saw Brighton become the first Sussex side to win promotion to the top flight of English football, and won promotion to the Premier League in 2017. Crawley Town became Sussex's second team to gain Football League status in 2011.

The Brighton, Worthing & District Football League (levels 12-14) was created in 2014 following a merger between the Brighton, Hove & District League (formed 1903) and the Worthing & District League.

In 2015 the FA rebranded the Sussex County Football League as the Southern Combination Football League. This followed the controversial removal of Crowborough Athletic to the Southern Counties East Football League (formerly the Kent Football League) as the FA sought to increase the number of clubs playing in that league.

In August 2015, two Worthing United players, Matthew Grimstone and Jacob Schilt, were among those killed when an aircraft crashed on the A27 road near Shoreham Airport. They were driving to the Robert Albon Memorial ground to participate in a match against Loxwood, which was consequently called off. The crash took place close to Albion's training centre at Lancing and Grimstone worked as a member of the grounds staff at Falmer Stadium, while Schilt was also an Albion supporter.

=== Development of women's football ===
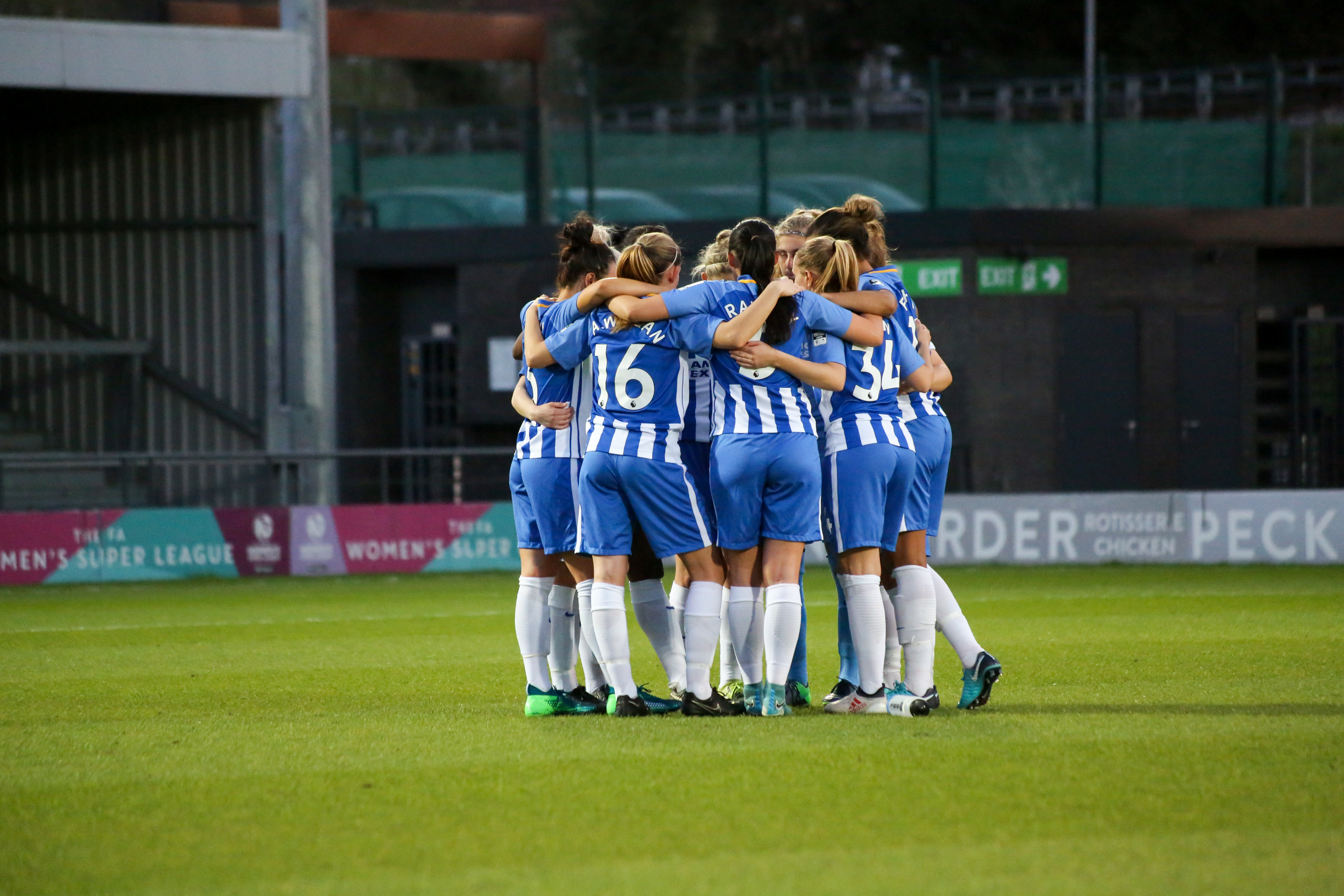
Brighton & Hove Albion became Sussex's first women's full-time professional football club in 2018

Initially made up of six football clubs in Sussex, the Sussex Martlets league for women's football was created in 1969 by Norma Witherden. In later years the league expanded to include further clubs from Sussex as well as clubs from Kent and Surrey and in 1990 the league was renamed the South East Counties Women's Football League. It now forms steps six to ten of the pyramid system for women's football in Sussex.

In 2017 Lewes became the world's first professional or semi-professional football club to pay women and men equally. The club were then admitted to the FA Women's Championship, the second tier of women's football in England. In the same season Brighton & Hove Albion became Sussex's first full-time professional women's team and won promotion to the FA Women's Super League, the top tier of women's football, for the first time.

== Governing body ==
Founded on 23 September 1882, the Sussex County FA was founded by several football clubs including Burgess Hill, Chichester and Horsham. The 1882–83 season saw the Sussex FA create the Sussex Senior Cup, which was won for the first time by Brighton Rangers. The competition continues to run and is the longest running football competition administered by the Sussex County FA.

Whilst the main aim of county football associations was to ensure clubs had many matches to play, a secondary aim was to help organise the recreation of schoolchildren. The Sussex County FA was formed at the time when parents in Sussex were pressing local schools to introduce games on Saturdays, with the intention of keeping children out of mischief.

The Sussex FA also helps organise matches for teams to represent Sussex including for women, males under-16 and males under-18. Sussex is also the first county to have a representative team for people with disability. The Sussex disability football team will play in the South East Regional 11-a-side Disability Cup, which is a pan-disability competition.

== Club football ==
=== Men ===
==== Clubs ====
===== Levels 1-4 (Professional clubs) =====
These clubs play in fully professional leagues, at levels 1–4 of the English football league system.

Club	League	Home Ground	Town/City
Level 1
Brighton & Hove Albion	Premier League	Falmer Stadium	Brighton
Level 3
Crawley Town	EFL League One	Broadfield Stadium	Crawley

===== Levels 5–8 (Semi-professional) =====
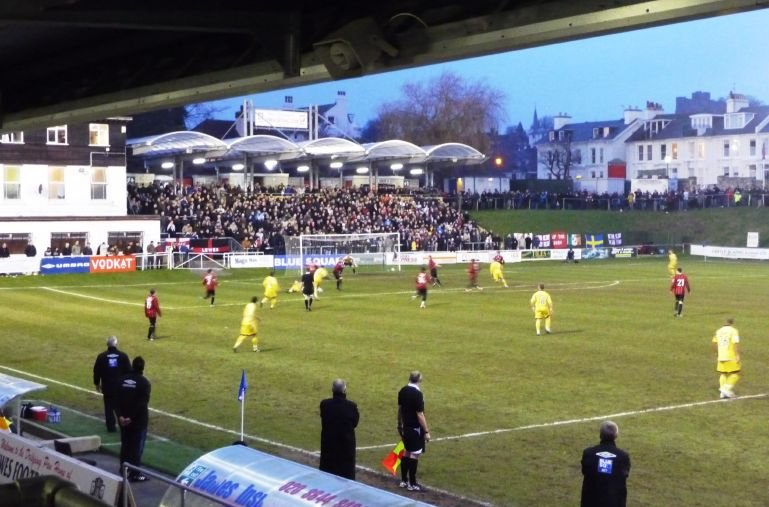
Lewes playing Eastbourne Borough at The Dripping Pan in 2009

These clubs play in semi-professional and amateur leagues, at levels 5–8 of the English football league system. The list does not include reserve teams of clubs that may play further down the pyramid.

Club	Home Ground	Town/City	League	Level
Bognor Regis Town	Nyewood Lane	Bognor Regis	Isthmian League Premier Division	7
Burgess Hill Town	Leylands Park	Burgess Hill	Isthmian League South East Division	8
Chichester City	Oaklands Park	Chichester	Isthmian League Premier Division	7
Eastbourne Borough	Priory Lane	Eastbourne	National League South	6
East Grinstead Town	East Court	East Grinstead	Isthmian League South East Division	8
Hastings United	The Pilot Field	Hastings	Isthmian League Premier Division	7
Haywards Heath Town	Hanbury Park	Haywards Heath	Isthmian League South East Division	8
Horsham	The Fusion Aviation Community Stadium	Horsham	Isthmian League Premier Division	7
Lancing	Culver Road	Lancing	Isthmian League South East Division	8
Lewes	The Dripping Pan	Lewes	Isthmian League Premier Division	7
Littlehampton	The Sportsfield	Littlehampton	Isthmian League South East Division	8
Three Bridges	Jubilee Field	Crawley	Isthmian League South East Division	8
Whitehawk	The Enclosed Ground	Brighton	Isthmian League Premier Division	7
Worthing	Woodside Road	Worthing	National League	5

==== Cup competitions ====
National cups:

- FA Cup
- League Cup
- FA Trophy

Sussex cups:

- Sussex Senior Cup, first held in 1882–83, is the oldest of Sussex'c county cups and the most prestigious of the Sussex cups. It is open to around 50 clubs in levels 1–10 of the football pyramid, although Brighton & Hove Albion submit their under 23 team.
- Sussex RUR Cup, first held in 1896–97 when it was known as the Sussex Royal Irish Rifles Cup after the Royal Irish Rifles were deemed 'champions of Sussex'.
- Sussex Community Shield - held between the winners of the Sussex Senior Cup and the Southern Combination Football League (formerly the Sussex County Football League).

=== Women ===
==== Level 1 (Professional clubs) ====
These clubs play in the fully professional league at level 1 of the Women's football league system.

Club	League	Home Ground	Town/City
Level 1
Brighton & Hove Albion	FA Women's Super League	Broadfield Stadium	Crawley

==== Levels 2-4 (Semi-professional) ====
These clubs play in semi-professional and amateur leagues, at levels 2–3 of the Women's football league system. The list does not include reserve teams of clubs that may play further down the pyramid.

Club	Home Ground	Town/City	League	Level
Lewes	The Dripping Pan	Lewes	FA Women's Championship	2
Selsey	High Street Ground	Selsey	FA Women's National League South West	4
Haywards Heath Town L.F.C	Hanbury Park	Haywards Heath	FA Women's National League South East	4
Worthing	Woodside Road	Worthing	FA Women's National League South East	4

==== Levels 5-8 ====
Club	Home Ground	Town/City	League	Level
Crawley A.F.C.		Crawley	London and South East Women's Regional Football League Premier Division	5
Bexhill United		Bexhill-on-Sea	London and South East Women's Regional Football League Division 1 South	6
Bognor Regis Town		Bognor Regis	London and South East Women's Regional Football League Division 1 South	6
Eastbourne United		Eastbourne	London and South East Women's Regional Football League Division 1 South	6
Hassocks		Hassocks	London and South East Women's Regional Football League Division 1 South	6
Hastings United		Hastings	London and South East Women's Regional Football League Division 1 South	6
Montpelier Villa		Brighton	London and South East Women's Regional Football League Division 1 South	6
Newhaven		Newhaven	London and South East Women's Regional Football League Division 1 South	6
Steyning Town Community F.C.		Steyning	London and South East Women's Regional Football League Division 1 South	6

==== Cup competitions ====
National cups:

- Women's FA Cup
- FA Women's League Cup

Sussex cups:

- Sussex Women's Challenge Cup - the senior cup competition in Sussex for women

== International football ==
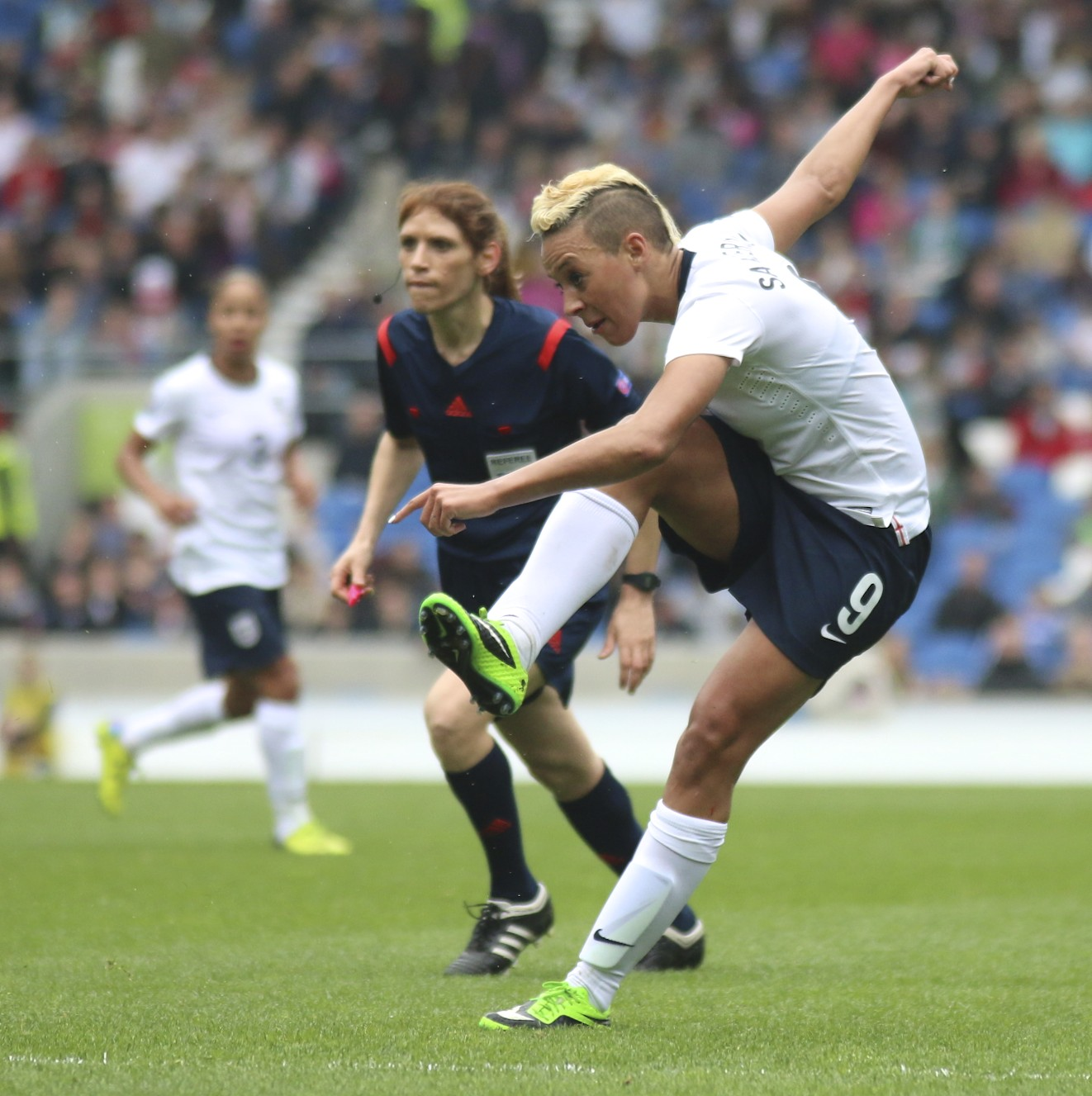
Lianne Sanderson shooting for England against Montenegro in 2014 at Falmer Stadium

=== Men ===
On 25 March 2013 the England national under-21 football team played a friendly against the Austria at Falmer Stadium, winning 4—0. The Chagos Islands national football team have also played many of their home games in Sussex, owing to the large Chagos Islands community that exists in and around Crawley. In February 2013, the Chagos Football Association, was formed in Crawley by Sabrina Jean and others to continue the management of the Chagos Islands team. Home matches have been played in Crawley at Tinsley Lane and the Broadfield Stadium, as well as at the Camping World Community Stadium in Horsham.

=== Women ===
On 5 April 2014 Falmer Stadium hosted a group qualifier match for the 2015 FIFA Women's World Cup where England beat Montenegro 9–0. Additionally, on 1 June 2019, Falmer Stadium hosted an international friendly for The Lionesses' last warmup game before the 2019 FIFA Women's World Cup where England lost 1—0 to New Zealand.

Falmer Stadium is also due to be a host stadium for the UEFA Women's Euro 2022 competition.

== Stadiums in Sussex ==
Falmer Stadium is the largest stadium in Sussex, with a capacity of 31,876. It is owned by Brighton and Hove Albion and is used for home matches as well as the final of the Sussex Senior Cup. With a capacity of 6,134, Broadfield Stadium in Crawley is the second-largest stadium in Sussex. There are several other football grounds in Sussex with a capacity of over 1,000 including Nyewood Lane (4,500), Priory Lane (4,151), The Pilot Field (4,050), The Sportsfield (4,000), Woodside Road (4,000), The Dripping Pan (3,000), The Enclosed Ground (3,126), The Saffrons (3,000), the Fusion Aviation Community Stadium (3,000), Middle Road (2,000), Oaklands Park (2,000) and The Robert Albon Memorial Ground (1,504).

== Notable football players from Sussex ==
The following people from Sussex have played international football for England:

=== Men ===
- Charles Wollaston
- George Brann
- George Cotterill
- Tommy Cook
- Bobby Tambling
- Gareth Barry
- Lewis Dunk

In addition, Peter Bonetti and Gareth Southgate both grew up in Sussex.

Current English Premier League players from Sussex:

- Lewis Dunk
- Steve Cook
- Solly March
- Adam Webster
- Harrison Reed
- Jack Hinshelwood

== See also ==
- Sport in Sussex
- Football in England

== Bibliography ==
- Cairney, John (2011). A Scottish Football Hall of Fame. Random House. ISBN 9781780570594.
- Collins, Tony, ed. (2005). Encyclopedia of Traditional British Rural Sports. Routledge. ISBN 978-0415352246.
- Doughan, David; Gordon, Peter (2007). Women, Clubs and Associations in Britain. Routledge. ISBN 978-1134204366.
- Harvey, Adrian (2005). Football: The First Hundred Years : the Untold Story. Routledge. ISBN 9780415350198.
- Morris, Terry (2016). Vain Games of No Value?: A Social History of Association Football in Britain During Its First Long Century. AuthorHouse. ISBN 978-1504998529.
- Walker, Malcolm (2017). The Birth of Football. BookBaby. ISBN 9781483595658.
- Weeks, Marcus (2008). Sussex Music. Alfriston: Snake River Press. ISBN 978-1-906022-10-5.
