= Sport in Sussex =

Sport in Sussex forms an important part of the culture of Sussex. With a centuries-long tradition of sport, Sussex has played a key role in the early development of both cricket and stoolball. Cricket is recognised as having been formed in the Weald and Sussex CCC is England's oldest county cricket club. Slindon Cricket Club dominated the sport for a while in the 18th century. The cricket ground at Arundel Castle traditionally plays host to a Duchess of Norfolk's XI which plays the national test sides touring England. The sport of stoolball is also associated with Sussex, which has a claim to be where the sport originated and certainly where its revival took place in the early 20th century. Sussex is represented in the Premier League by Brighton & Hove Albion and in the Football League by Crawley Town. Brighton has been in the Premier League since 2017 and has been a League member since 1920, whereas Crawley was promoted to the League in 2011. Brighton & Hove Albion W.F.C. play in the FA Women's Super League from 2017. Sussex has had its own football association, since 1882 and its own football league, which has since expanded into Surrey, since 1920. In horse racing, Sussex is home to Goodwood, Fontwell Park, Brighton and Plumpton. The All England Jumping Course show jumping facility at Hickstead is situated 8 miles (13 km) north of Brighton and Hove.

Sussex has often been an early adopter of sport for women; references to women playing cricket from 1677, and stoolball from 1747. Women were playing in a stoolball league in Sussex as early as the 1860s. In football, Brighton & Hove Albion's women's team was founded in 1967 as Brighton GPO, making the club one of the oldest extant football clubs in England fielding a women's team. Founded in 1969, the Sussex Martlets Women's League (replaced in 1990 by the South East Counties Women's League) was one of the earliest in England.

Active Sussex is the county sports partnership for Sussex and its main aim is to increase participation in sport and physical activity at a local level.

== Team sports ==
=== Cricket ===
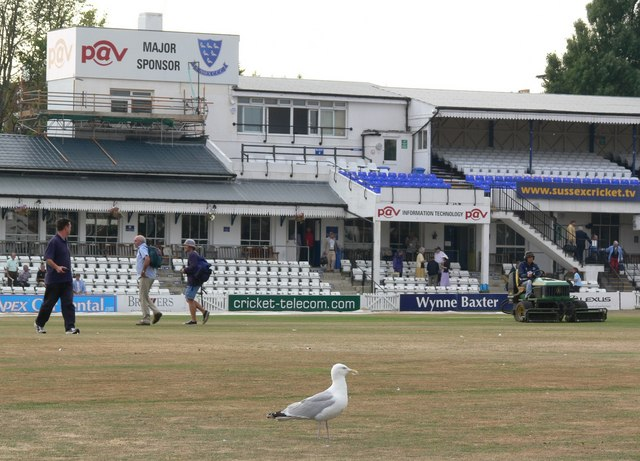
The County Cricket Ground in Hove has been the main home of Sussex cricket since 1872.

Sussex played a key role in the development of the sport of cricket and is generally held to have been invented or developed in the Weald of Sussex and Kent. Records from 1611 indicate the first time that the sport was documented in Sussex; this is also the first reference to cricket being played by adults. The first reference to women's cricket is also from Sussex and dates from 1677; a match between two Sussex women's teams playing in London is documented from 1747.

Founded in 1839, Sussex County Cricket Club (Sussex CCC) is believed to be the oldest professional sports club in the world. It is the oldest of the county cricket clubs and represents Sussex in the eighteen-club County Championship. Sussex players, including Jem Broadbridge and William Lillywhite were instrumental in bringing about the change from underarm bowling to roundarm bowling, which later developed into overarm bowling. For some time roundarm bowling was referred to as 'Sussex bowling'. Sussex CCC have won the men's County Championship three times, while the Sussex Women cricket team has won the women's County Championship four times.

Recreational cricket is also popular in Sussex and is governed by the Sussex Cricket Board, which merged with Sussex CCC in 2015. Founded in 1971, the Sussex Cricket League is believed to be the largest adult cricket league in the world, with 335 teams in 2018. From 2016 the Sussex Cricket League has also included a team representing Guernsey. The England and Wales Cricket Board has recognised the league's top division as a designated ECB Premier League since 1999. Notable Sussex cricketers include Jem Broadbridge, John Wisden, James Lillywhite, former England women's captain Holly Colvin and former England international Clare Connor.

=== Football ===
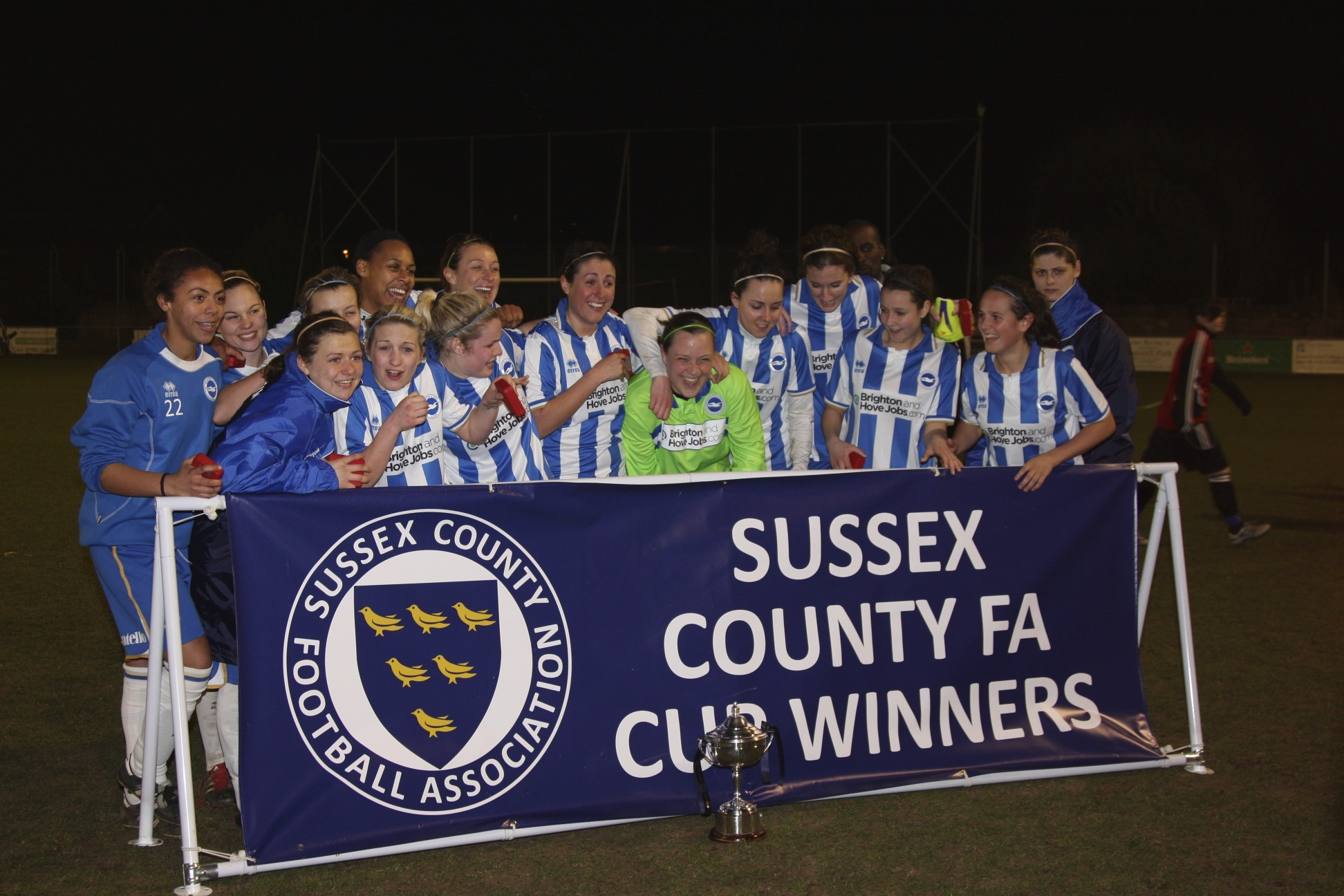
Brighton & Hove Albion W.F.C. after winning the Sussex County FA Women's Challenge Cup in 2012

There is a long tradition of football matches taking place in Sussex although the game was different from the modern codes of association football and rugby football. Two references to medieval football matches come from Sussex in 1403 and 1404 at Selmeston and Chidham that took place as part of baptisms. On each occasion one of the players broke his leg. Lancing College created its own code of football in 1856. Seen as a means of fostering teamwork, the code had 12-a-side teams. Football is reported as having been played at Brighton College by 1859. Brighton and Lancing Colleges are recorded as having played a football match in November 1860, the first by public schools in Sussex. Brighton College are recorded as having played a Brighton schools team at football in 1861. It appears that the venture was not successful, largely because people outside the college had difficulty understanding the particular rules which varied from college to college. In 1865 a player of the Lancing rules game described a match as "not much of a game, rather an inchoate barging match". The rules followed by Brighton College were related to the rules of Rugby School. Brighton Football Club was founded in 1868 by former students of Brighton College. Brighton went on to follow the codes and laws of Rugby College and the Rugby Football Union which was set up in 1871.

Association rules were adopted at Lancing College by 1871 and at Brighton College by 1873. Former Lancing pupil Jarvis Kenrick went on to score the first goal ever to be scored in the FA Cup as well as winning the FA Cup three years running with London-based Wanderers F.C. The Sussex County Football Association was created in 1882; the Sussex Senior Challenge Cup was set up from the 1882–83 season. By the end of the 19th century the London, Brighton and South Coast Railway fielded six different teams in Sussex - Juniors, Locomotive, Rovers, Strugglers, Wanderers and Wasps. Several local leagues were set up within Sussex at the end of the 19th century - the West Sussex Football League in 1895, the East Sussex Football League in 1896, the Hastings League in 1897 and the Horsham League in 1898. The Sussex County Football League was created in 1920.

Sussex is represented in the Premier League by Brighton & Hove Albion and in the Football League by Crawley Town. Brighton have been a Premier League member since 2017 and were members of the Football League after they were elected to the Football League's new Third Division in 1920 – having previously been members of the Southern League. Crawley were promoted to the Football League in 2011. Sussex also had its own football league from 1920 to 2015 following changes by the Football Association re-organising the structure of leagues in southern England when the Sussex County Football League was renamed the Southern Combination Football League. The senior cup of the Sussex FA is the Sussex Senior Challenge Cup, the final of which has been held since 2011 at Falmer Stadium. In women's football, Brighton play in the FA Women's Super League and Lewes play in the FA Women's Premier League Southern Division. Notable football players from Sussex include five times FA Cup winner, Charles Wollaston, who played in the inaugural FA Cup Final in 1872 and former England international players George Brann, George Cotterill, Gareth Barry and Lewis Dunk.

=== Rugby Union ===
The Sussex Rugby Football Union is the society responsible for rugby union in the county of Sussex, England and is one of the constituent bodies of the national Rugby Football Union. The first rugby club in Sussex was Brighton, formed in 1868. Sussex's highest rated club is Worthing. As of 2015/16 Worthing were playing in the fourth tier of the English rugby union league system, National League 2 South. Rugby union players from Sussex include New Zealand-born England captain Dylan Hartley, Joe Marler, Billy Twelvetrees, Tom Mitchell, Alex King, Ollie Richards and Ross Chisholm.

=== American football ===
Based in Brighton, Sussex Thunder play in the British American Football Association's BAFA National Leagues.

=== Basketball ===
Playing in the English Basketball League, Worthing Thunder is Sussex's highest placed basketball club. The club played in the top-tier British Basketball League between 2008 and 2011. Previously the Brighton Bears (in 1993) and Worthing Bears (in 2004) had won the top-tier British Basketball League. In Sussex basketball is administered by Basketball Sussex.

=== Hockey ===
There are a number of field hockey clubs in East Sussex and West Sussex that are part of the South East Hockey league structure. Some of these clubs have first XI teams that are in the Men's England Hockey League and the Women's England Hockey League.

Currently there are hockey clubs based in Brighton & Hove, Burgess Hill, Chichester, Crawley, Crowborough, East Grinstead, Eastbourne, Hailsham, Hastings, Haywards Heath, Horsham, Lewes, Littlehampton, Middleton, Southwick, Steyning and Worthing.

=== Netball ===
Netball is played by girls and women. In Sussex the sport is administered through the Sussex County Netball Association (often referred to as Sussex Netball).

=== Polo ===
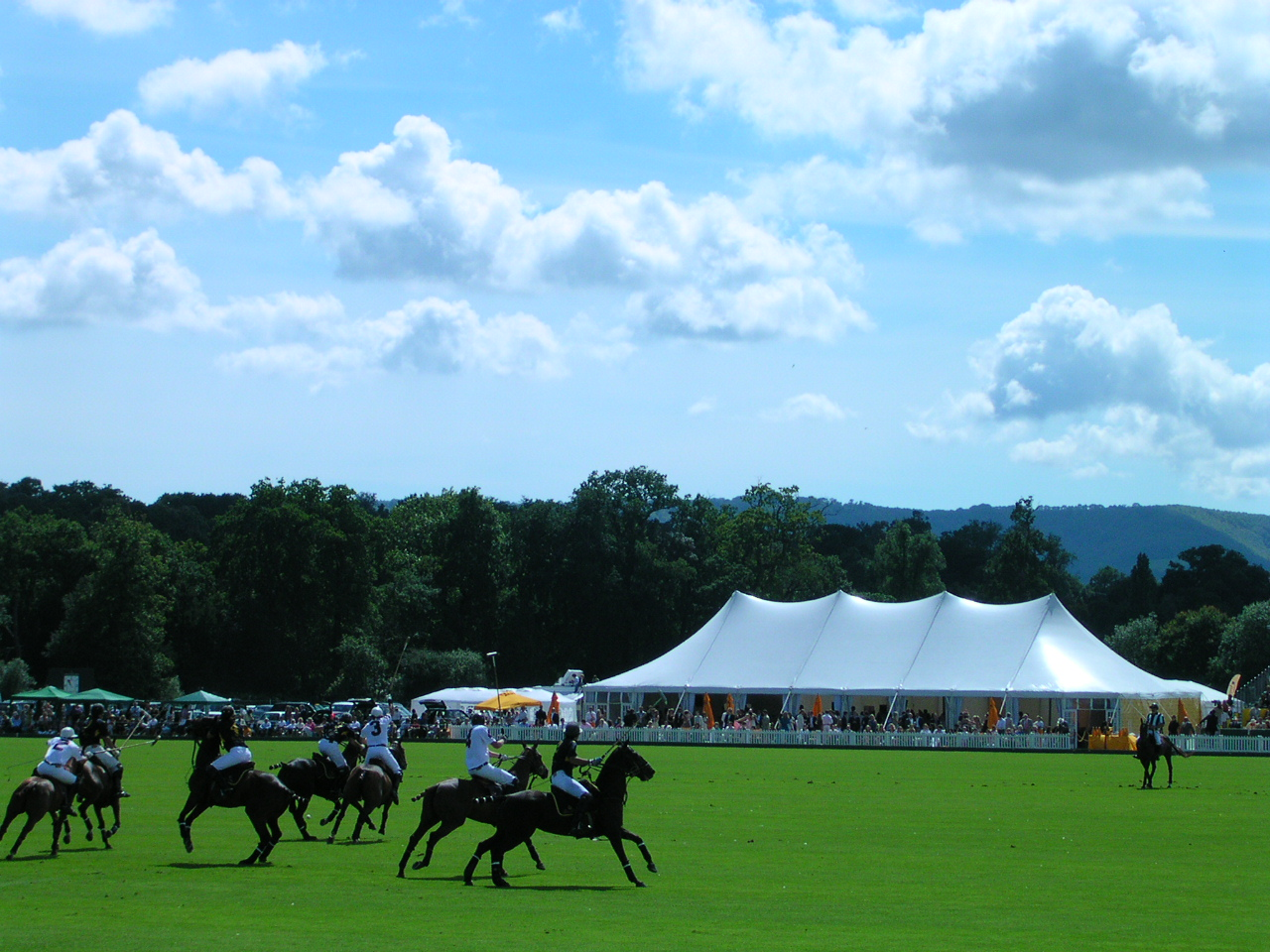
Polo played at Cowdray Park near Midhurst

Cowdray Park near Midhurst has been home to the British Open or Gold Cup since 1967, the most important polo tournament in the UK and one of the most important in the world.

=== Stoolball ===
The sport of stoolball is strongly associated with Sussex; it has been referred to as Sussex's 'national' sport and a Sussex game or pastime. The first inter-county stoolball match took place between the women of Sussex and Kent in 1797 at Tunbridge Wells Common on the historic border between the two counties. Sussex women wore blue ribbons to represent the county. In 1866 the first recorded stoolball match took place between teams of named women representing villages as the Glynde Butterflies took on the Firle Blues.

The sport's modern rules were codified at Glynde in 1881 where the two slightly different sets of rules in the east and the west of Sussex were brought together. Modern stoolball is centred on Sussex where the game was revived in the early 20th century by Major William Grantham. First played in 1923, the League Championship Challenge Cup is open to the winning teams of the five leagues of the Sussex County Stoolball Association - North, East, West, Mid and Central. Since 1938 Sussex and Kent have competed annually for the Rose Bowl, although sometimes one of Sussex's five leagues may represent the county against Kent.

== Individual sports ==
=== Archery ===
Archery in Sussex is administered by the Sussex County Archery Association Notable archers include Margaret Weedon.

=== Athletics ===
Athletics in Sussex is governed by the Sussex County Athletics Association and all athletics clubs in the county are encouraged affiliate to the SCAA. The SCAA hosts the Sussex County Championships for track and field athletics each May as well as the Sussex Cross Country Championships each January. Founded in 2010, the Brighton Marathon has grown to be one of the UK's largest marathons and in 2011 was granted Bronze Medal status by the World governing body, the International Association of Athletics Federations (IAAF). Withdean Stadium in Brighton is the county's main athletics stadium. Sussex athletes include Everard Davis, George Hutson, Steve Ovett, Sally Gunnell and Craig Pickering.

=== Bowls ===
The sport of bowls has a long history in Sussex. Bowls England was located in Worthing until moving to Leamington Spa in Warwickshire in 2013 and Worthing remains, with Johannesburg, one of only two locations in the world to have hosted the men's World Bowls Championships twice.

=== Boxing ===
Boxing has a long history in Sussex. A contest on 18 December 1810 between Tom Cribb, from Bristol, and Tom Molineaux, a slave from the US state of Virginia was held at Copthall Common (now Copthorne Common) near East Grinstead in what was one of the most controversial and brutal fights to have been held. The event was also the first in which the winner was awarded a boxing belt. Boxers from Sussex include Tom Sayers, Alan Minter, Chris Eubank, Scott Welch and Chris Eubank Jr.

=== Cycling ===
Founded in 1921 the Sussex Cyclists' Association promotes races and competitions for members of cycling clubs in Sussex. The London to Brighton Bike Ride has taken place every year since 1976. and in 2014 involved an estimated 30,000 riders. Built in 1877, the velodrome at Preston Park in Brighton is thought to be the oldest in the UK. Sussex featured in the 1994 Tour de France, which included a stage finish in Brighton. Sussex cyclists include William Hammond.

=== Equestrian events ===
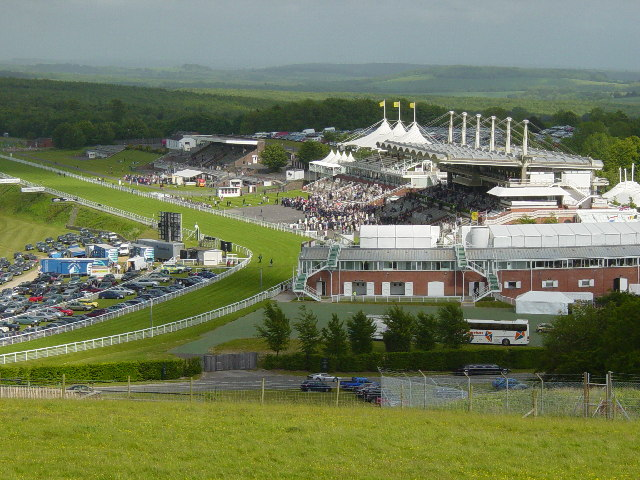
Goodwood Racecourse on the South Downs near Chichester

Organised horse racing has existed in Sussex since at least as far back as the 18th century. There are racecourses at Brighton and Goodwood while Fontwell Park is the only figure of eight racecourse in England. There is a National Hunt (jumping) course at Plumpton. Major flat horse races include the Sussex Stakes and the Nassau Stakes, both at Goodwood. Hickstead near Burgess Hill is home to the All England Jumping Course which hosts the British Jumping Derby and the Royal International Horse Show. Notable horseriders from Sussex include Kristina Cook and Liam Treadwell.

=== Golf ===
Golf in the county is administered by the Sussex County Golf Union, which arranges county championships and tournaments as well as inter-county matches. The PGA in Sussex (formerly known as the Sussex County PGA) was formed to run professional tournaments open to all PGA professionals and registered assistants, under the jurisdiction of the regulations of the PGA. Established in 1912, the Sussex Professional Golfers' Union continues to run in alliance with The PGA in Sussex (formerly known as the Sussex County PGA). Established in Lewes in 1900, the Sussex County Ladies' Golf Club (now the Sussex County Ladies' Golf Association) has 60 affiliated clubs and nearly 4,300 members. The county colours of canary yellow and blue were established in the 1960s.

Sussex is home to over 60 golf clubs, including Dale Hill, Pulborough, Royal Ashdown Forest, Rye, Worthing and the East Sussex National, which hosted the European Open in the 1990s. There are over 200 PGA professionals and registered assistants in Sussex. The first Sussex clubs were Royal Eastbourne, Seaford and Brighton were established in 1887. Brighton and Hove Ladies' Golf Club was established in 1891. Golfers based in Sussex include Open Championship winner Max Faulkner, Gary Evans, Ben Evans and two-time European Tour winner Jamie Spence from the Nevill Golf Club near the Kent border.

=== Motorsport ===
Sussex is home to the Oval Raceway near Angmering. Racing drivers from Sussex include David Purley, Derek Bell and Jolyon Palmer. First held in 1905, the Brighton Speed Trials is commonly held to be the oldest running motor race. The Goodwood Festival of Speed is a major annual event that is held at the historic Goodwood Circuit. In motorcycle speedway, Eastbourne Eagles compete at Arlington in the British National League, having competed in the Elite League until 2014. The Hastings Saxons competed in speedway in 1948 and 1949.

=== Real tennis ===
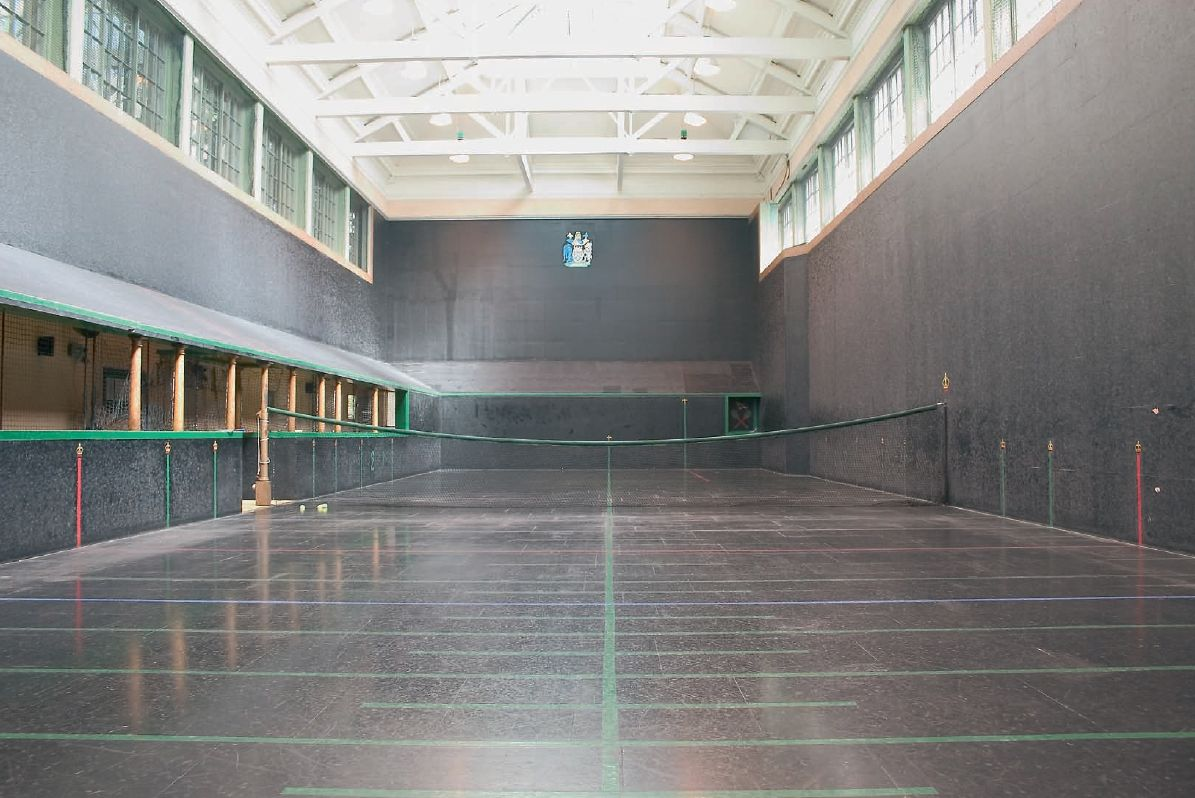
Real tennis court at Petworth House

The sport of real tennis, continues to be played at Sussex's only current real tennis court at Petworth House in Petworth where the sport has been played since at least as far back as 1588, a record exceeded only by the English and Scottish royal palaces at Hampton Court and Falkland. Real tennis is the original racquet sport from which the modern game of lawn tennis (usually simply called tennis) is derived. The surviving court at Petworth House dates from 1872 and is one of 43 locations across the world with real tennis courts.

=== Snooker ===
Snooker players from Sussex include Mark Davis.

=== Swimming ===
The Sussex County Amateur Swimming Association or Sussex County ASA represents the interests of affiliated swimmers across Sussex. Its first president was installed in 1895. Brighton Swimming Club is the oldest swimming club in England, having been established in 1860. Swimmers from Sussex include Iris Tanner, Christine Gosden, Rebecca Cooke and Gemma Spofforth.

=== Tennis ===
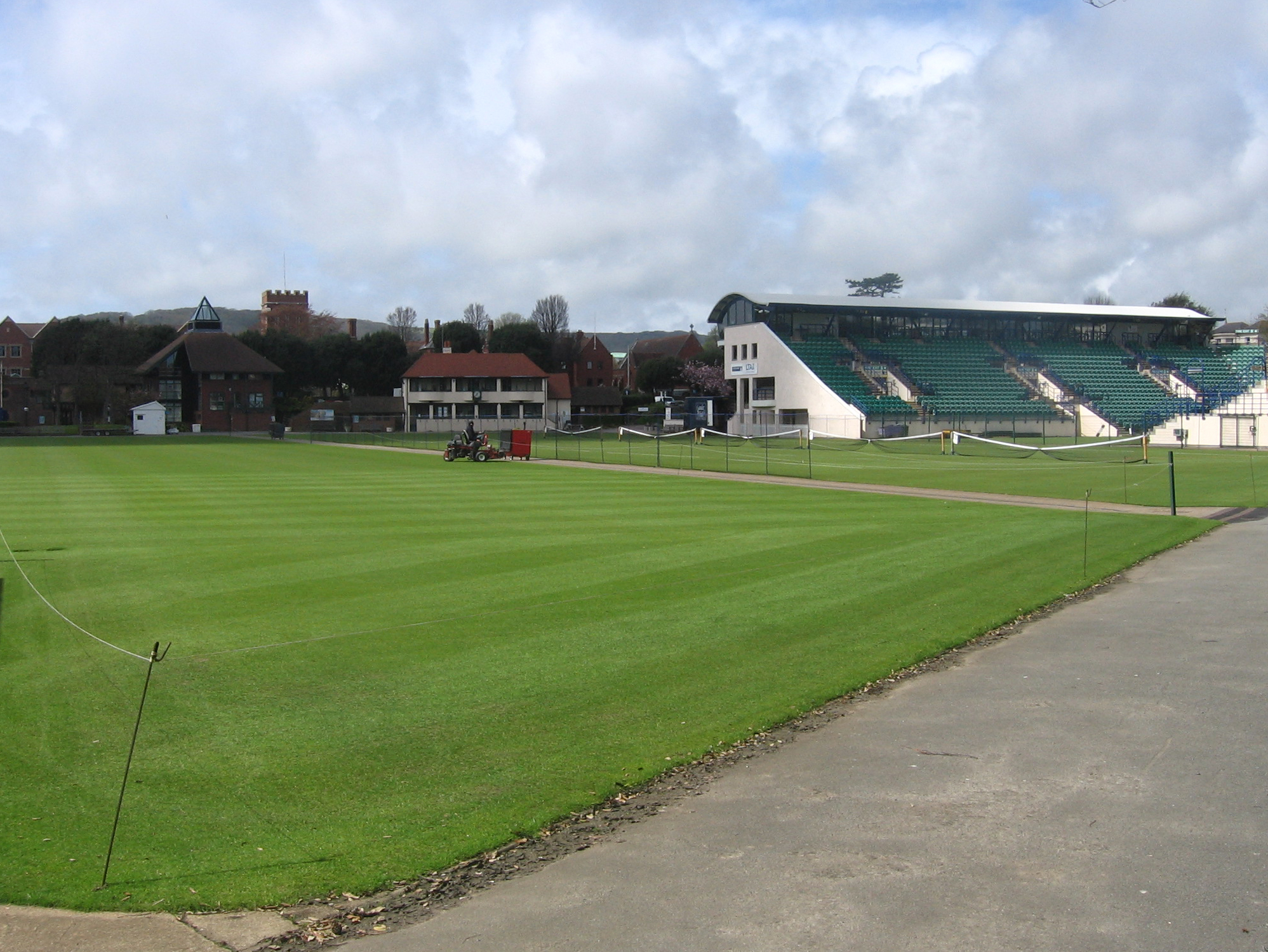
Devonshire Park in Eastbourne holds an annual WTA Premier tournament.

Devonshire Park Lawn Tennis Club in Eastbourne has hosted tennis championships since 1874 and has held the Eastbourne Opensince 1974, one of the Women's Tennis Association's Premier tournaments. From 1881 to 1972 Devonshire Park was also home to the South of England Championships. The 1981 ATP Challenger Series featured tournaments at Worthing and Chichester.

Leslie Godfree won the Wimbledon doubles in 1923 and the mixed doubles at Wimbledon in 1926. Wimbledon and Australian Open semi-finalist Johanna Konta lives in Eastbourne. The Sussex County Tennis Association are responsible for development of tennis in the county.

== Major sports facilities ==
=== Football ===
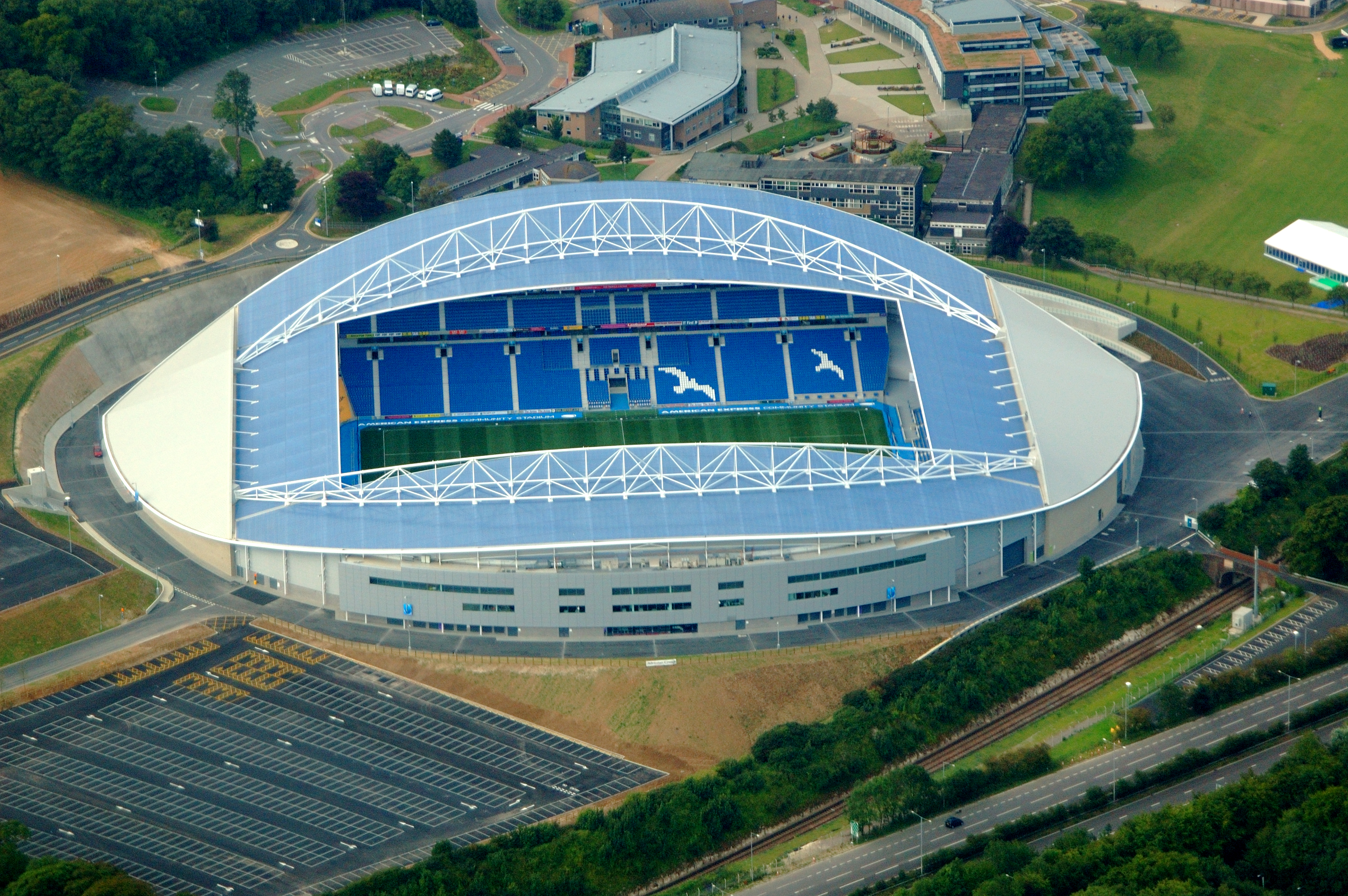
Aerial view of Falmer Stadium, the largest sports stadium in Sussex

With a capacity of 31,876, Falmer Stadium is built into the South Downs and has the largest capacity of any sports stadium in Sussex. It is followed by Broadfield Stadium in Crawley, which has a capacity of 6,134.

=== Cricket ===
The main home of Sussex cricket since 1872, the County Cricket Ground in Hove has a capacity of 7,000 and is the third largest sports stadium in Sussex after Falmer Stadium and the centre court at Devonshire Park Lawn Tennis Club in Eastbourne.

=== Golf courses ===
The East Sussex National Golf Club in Little Horsted has hosted the European Open (golf) twice in the 1990s. Hill Barn Golf Club in Worthing hosted the Penfold Tournament, part of the European Tour in 1969, 1970 and 1974.

=== Tennis ===
The Devonshire Park Lawn Tennis Club in Eastbourne first opened in 1874 and its centre court has a capacity of 8,000, making it one of the largest tennis stadiums in the world and the second largest sports stadium in Sussex.

=== Athletics ===
Withdean Stadium in Brighton is the largest athletics stadium in Sussex. Home to Brighton and Hove Albion between 1999 and 2011 it once had a capacity of 8,850 people, although this capacity has now been reduced.

== Major sporting events hosted in Sussex ==
Below is a list of international sporting events that have been held in Sussex at various venues

=== Cricket ===
International

- Cricket World Cup host town: Hove
  - 1999 Cricket World Cup: County Cricket Ground, Hove

=== Rugby Union ===
International

- Men's Rugby World Cup host town: Brighton
  - 2015: Brighton Community Stadium
- Women's Rugby World Cup host town: Brighton
  - 2025: Brighton and Hove Albion Stadium

=== Golf ===
- Penfold Tournament, part of the European Tour: 1969, 1970 and 1974: Hill Barn Golf Club, Worthing
- European Open: 1993, 1994: East Sussex National Golf Resort and Spa, Little Horsted

=== Tennis ===
- Eastbourne International - since 1974: Devonshire Park Lawn Tennis Club, Eastbourne
- Fed Cup - 1977: Devonshire Park Lawn Tennis Club, Eastbourne

=== Bowls ===
International

- World Bowls Championships host town: Worthing - 2
  - Beach House Park, Worthing - 1972, 1992

=== Marbles ===
The British and World Marbles Championship takes place annually on Good Friday at the Greyhound public house in Tinsley Green, West Sussex. It dates back to 1588, the modern event having run almost continuously since 1932.

== See also ==
- Culture of Sussex
- Sport in Worthing
- Sport in England
- Cricket in Sussex
- Football in Sussex

== Bibliography ==
- Brandon, Peter (2006). Sussex. London: Phillimore. ISBN 978-0-7090-6998-0.
- Coates, Richard (2010). The Traditional Dialect of Sussex. Pomegranate Press. ISBN 978-1-907242-09-0.
- Collins, Tony, ed. (2005). Encyclopedia of Traditional British Rural Sports. Routledge. ISBN 978-0415352246.
- Gomme, Alice Bertha (1894). The traditional games of England, Scotland and Ireland : with tunes, singing rhymes and methods of playing according to the variants extant and recorded in different parts of the kingdom. London: David Nutt.
- Harvey, Adrian (2013). Football: The First Hundred Years: The Untold Story. Routledge. ISBN 9781134269129.
- Locke, Tim (2011). Slow Sussex and the South Downs. Buckinghamshire: Bradt Travel Guides. ISBN 9781841623436.
- McCann, Tim (2004). Sussex Cricket in the Eighteenth Century. Sussex Record Society.
- Morris, Terry (2016). Vain Games of No Value?: A Social History of Association Football in Britain During Its First Long Century. AuthorHouse. ISBN 978-1504998529.
- Nauright, John (2012). Sports Around the World: History, Culture, and Practice. ABC-CLIO. ISBN 978-1598843002.
