= 1998 Australian Open (real tennis) =

- Date: 18-23 August (singles); 25–30 August (doubles)
- Edition: 67th
- Draw: 16S / 8D
- Location: Sydney, New South Wales (singles); Hobart, Tasmania (doubles)
- Venue: Macquarie University Real Tennis Club (singles); Hobart Real Tennis Club (doubles)

Champions

Men's singles
- (Australia) Robert Fahey

Women's singles
- (Australia) Barbara Baker

Men's doubles
- (United Kingdom) Ruaraidh Gunn / (Australia) Steve Virgona

Women's doubles
- (Australia) Barbara Baker / (Australia) Julianne Drewitt
- Australian Open (real tennis)

The 1998 Real Tennis Australian Open was the 67th edition of the Australian Open. The men's singles event was held at the Macquarie University Real Tennis Club in Sydney between 18 and 23 August 1998. It was followed two days later by the doubles event, held at the Hobart Real Tennis Club two days later. It was organised by the Australian Real Tennis Association. The men's draw was the second grand slam event of the year.

The men's singles draw was won by incumbent World Champion Robert Fahey for the fifth time, his third consecutive title. He beat Frank Filippelli in the final in a rematch of the 1997 final. The doubles draw was won by Ruaraidh Gunn and Steve Virgona, the pair having won the US Open earlier that year. They defeated Fahey and Peter Meares in the final. The women's final was won by Barbara Baker, the future Governor of Tasmania. She partnered with Julianne Drewitt to win the doubles.

== Draw and results ==
=== Men's Singles ===
Results are only available from the quarter finals onwards

Quarterfinals
(Australia) R Fahey	6	6	6
(Australia) M Happell	3	1	4
(United States) T Chisholm	6	6	3	6
(Australia) S Virgona	4	3	6	2
(Australia) W Davies	6	6	6
(Australia) B McFarlane	1	2	2
(Australia) F Filippelli	6	6	6
(Australia) B Dale	0	0	1

Semifinals
(Australia) R Fahey	6	6	4	6
(United States) T Chisholm	2	3	6	3
(Australia) W Davies	3	6	5	4
(Australia) F Filippelli	6	5	6	6

Finals
(Australia) R Fahey	3	6	6	6
(Australia) F Filippelli	6	1	5	5

=== Men's Doubles ===
Quarterfinals
(Australia) R Fahey (Australia) P Meares	6	6	6
(Australia) G Bradfield (Australia) G Wagner	0	0	0
(United States) T Chisholm (Australia) R Angell	6	6	4	6
(Australia) A Gurley (Australia) K Booth	5	3	6	2
(Australia) G Hyland (Australia) B Dale	6	6	6
(Australia) P Boyles (Australia) G Barnett	3	0	0
(United Kingdom) R Gunn (Australia) S Virgona	6	6	6
(Australia) G Bradfield (Australia) A Bradfield	0	0	1

Semifinals
(Australia) R Fahey (Australia) P Meares	6	4	6	6
(United States) T Chisholm (Australia) R Angell	3	6	1	2
(Australia) G Hyland (Australia) B Dale	3	5	2
(United Kingdom) R Gunn (Australia) S Virgona	6	6	6

Finals
(Australia) R Fahey (Australia) P Meares	5	1	0
(United Kingdom) R Gunn (Australia) S Virgona	6	6	6

== See also ==
- Grand Slam (real tennis)
