= Brighton, Worthing & District Football League =

Association football league in England

- Founded: 2014
- Country: England
- Divisions: 1
- Number of clubs: 11
- Feeder to: West Sussex Football League Championship South
- Domestic cup(s): Brighton College Cup; President's Cup; A.W. Bridle Knock-Out Trophy; John Whittington Jubilee Cup; Gentry Bowl; Coronation Cup; Supplementary Trophy
- Current champions: Lectern Fc (2024-25)
- Website: FA Full Time

The Brighton, Worthing & District Football League is a football competition involving teams in and around Brighton, Hove and Worthing in England. It was established in 2014 following a merger between the Brighton, Hove & District League (formed 1903) and the Worthing & District League. Winners of the Premier Division may apply for promotion to the West Sussex Football League Championship South. The number of teams has steadily reduced each year with the league down to one division in 2020/21. Some teams have transferred to the West Sussex League where the larger number of divisions result in more even competition.

== Member clubs (2024–25) ==
- A Brighter Community
- Boys Brigade Old Boys
- Clarendon Athletic
- Diversity United
- Hangleton
- Lectern
- Ovingdean
- Rustington Reserves
- St Marys
- Scape
- Sompting

== Champions ==
Season	Premier Division	Division One East	Division One West	Division Two West
2014–15	Romans United	Fiveways	George & Dragon	Worthing Dynamos
2015–16	Worthing Leisure	Southwick Rangers 'A'	Worthing Dynamos	AFC Sparta
2016–17	Worthing BCOB	Woodingdean Wanderers	MSR All Stars	
Season	Premier Division	Division One	Division Two	
2017–18	Sompting	Dragons	Sompting Reserves	
Season	Division One	Division Two		
2018–19	Northbrook	The Railway		
2019–20	Season declared null & void			
2020–21	Season declared null & void			
2021–22	Broadwater Athletic			
2022–23	Ovingdean			
2023–24	Ovingdean			
2024-25	Lectern FC			
