= List of real tennis organizations =

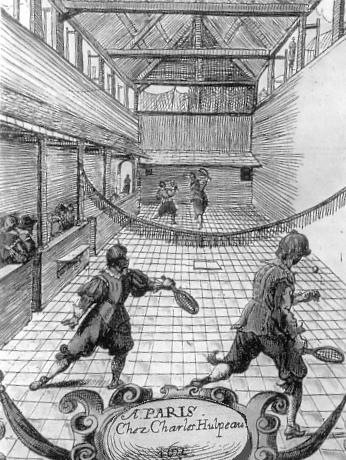
Real tennis in Paris, 17th century.

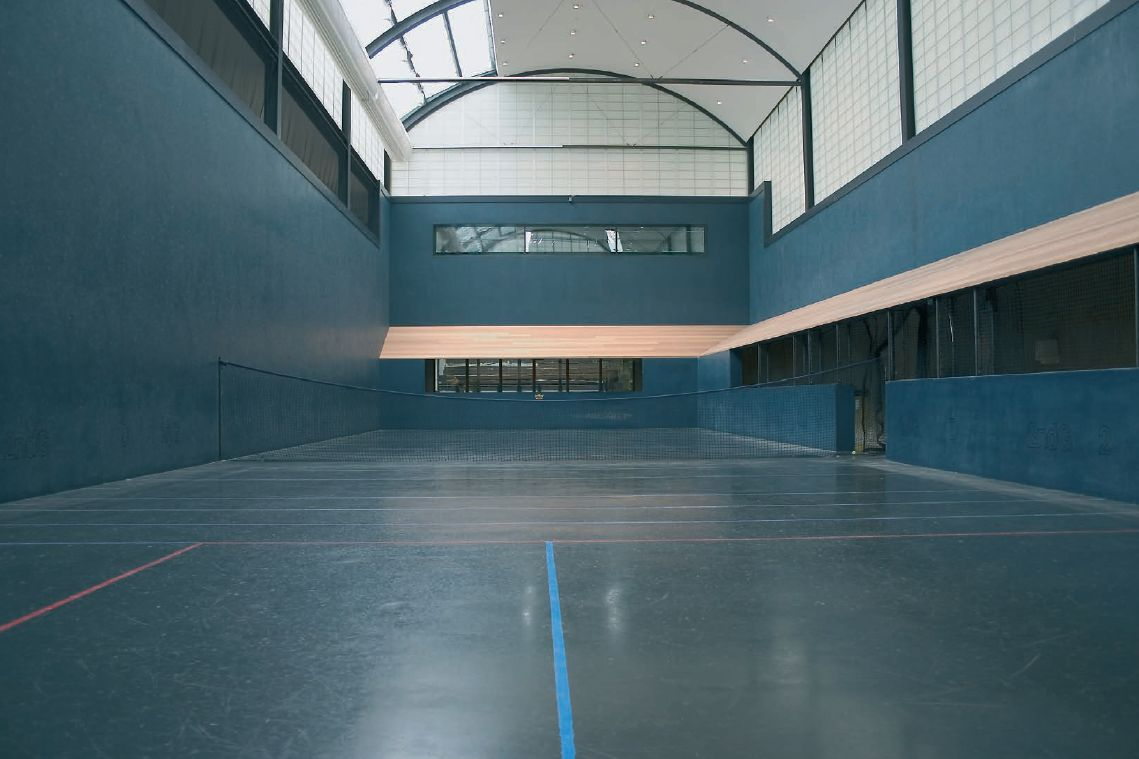
Middlesex University

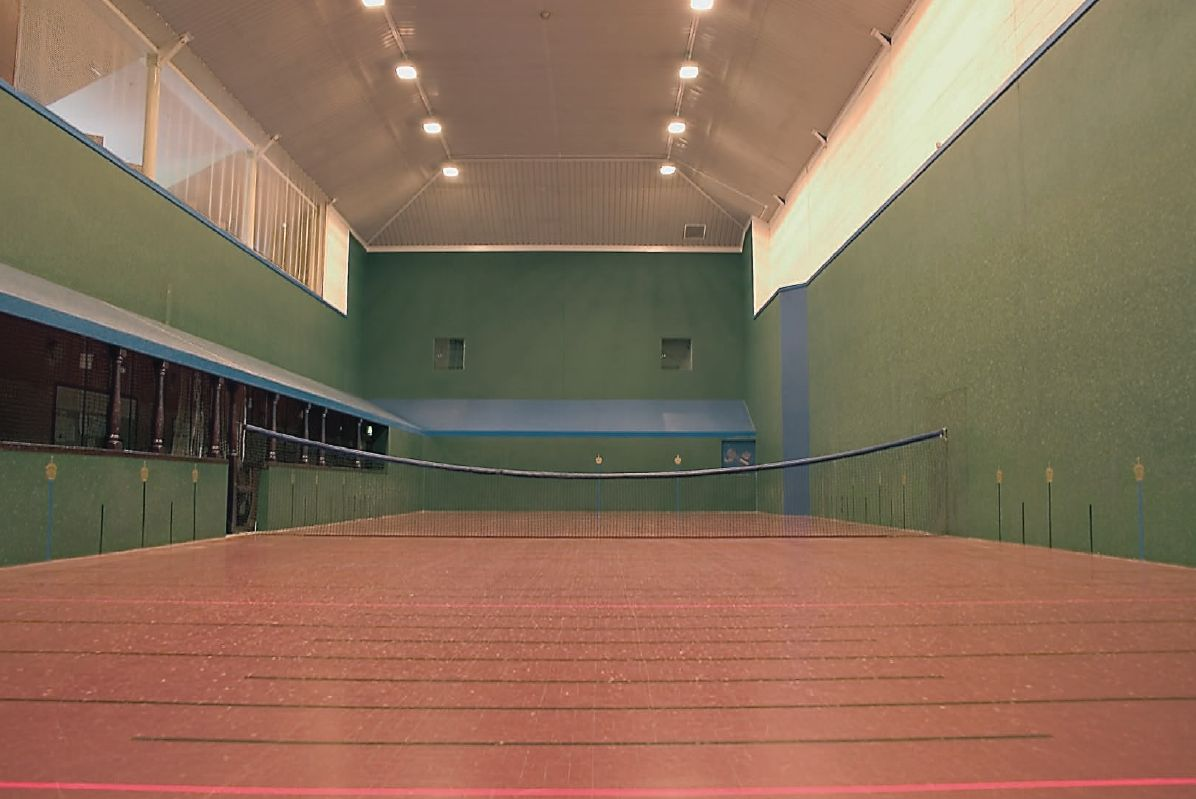
Bristol and Bath

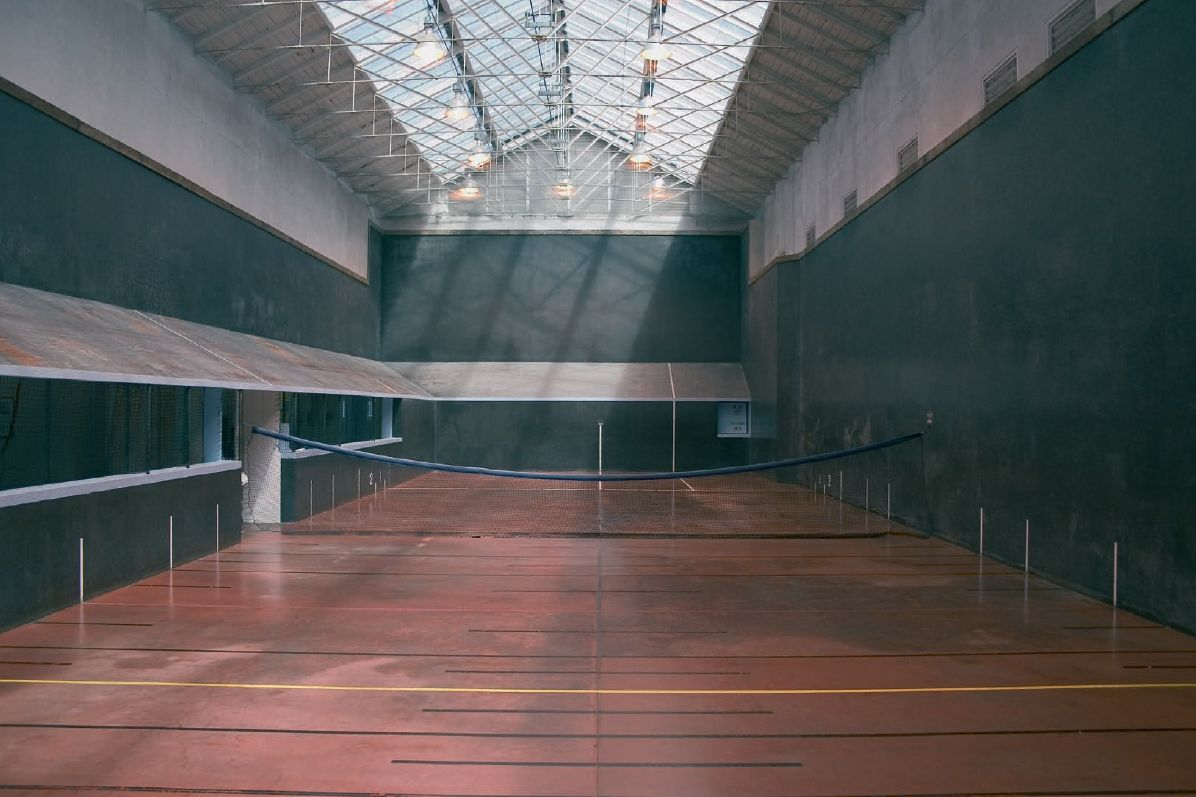
Canford

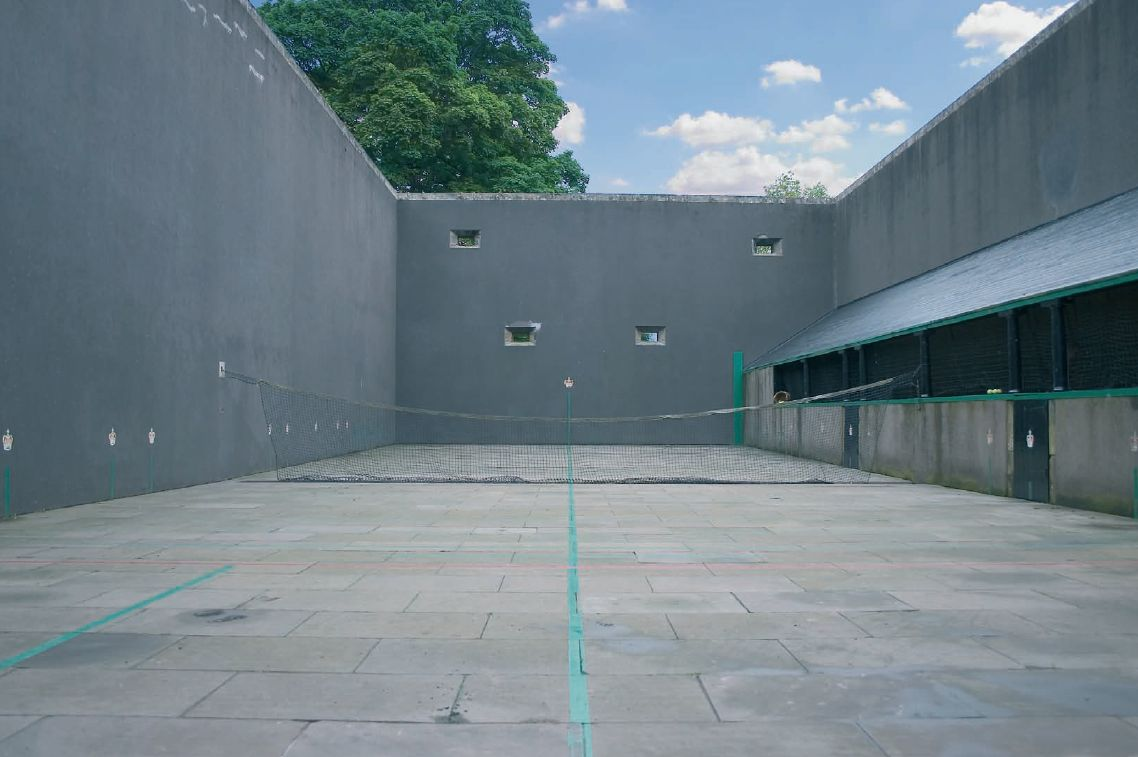
Falkland Palace

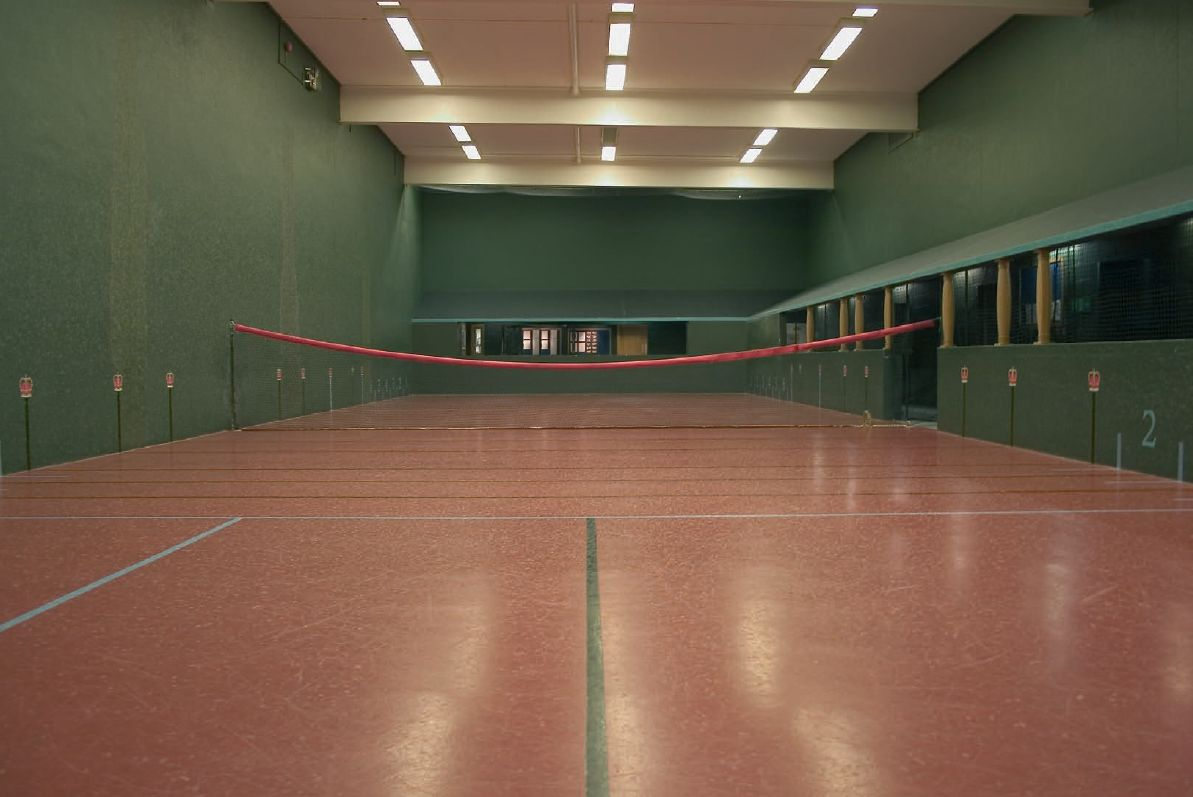
Harbour Club (now closed)

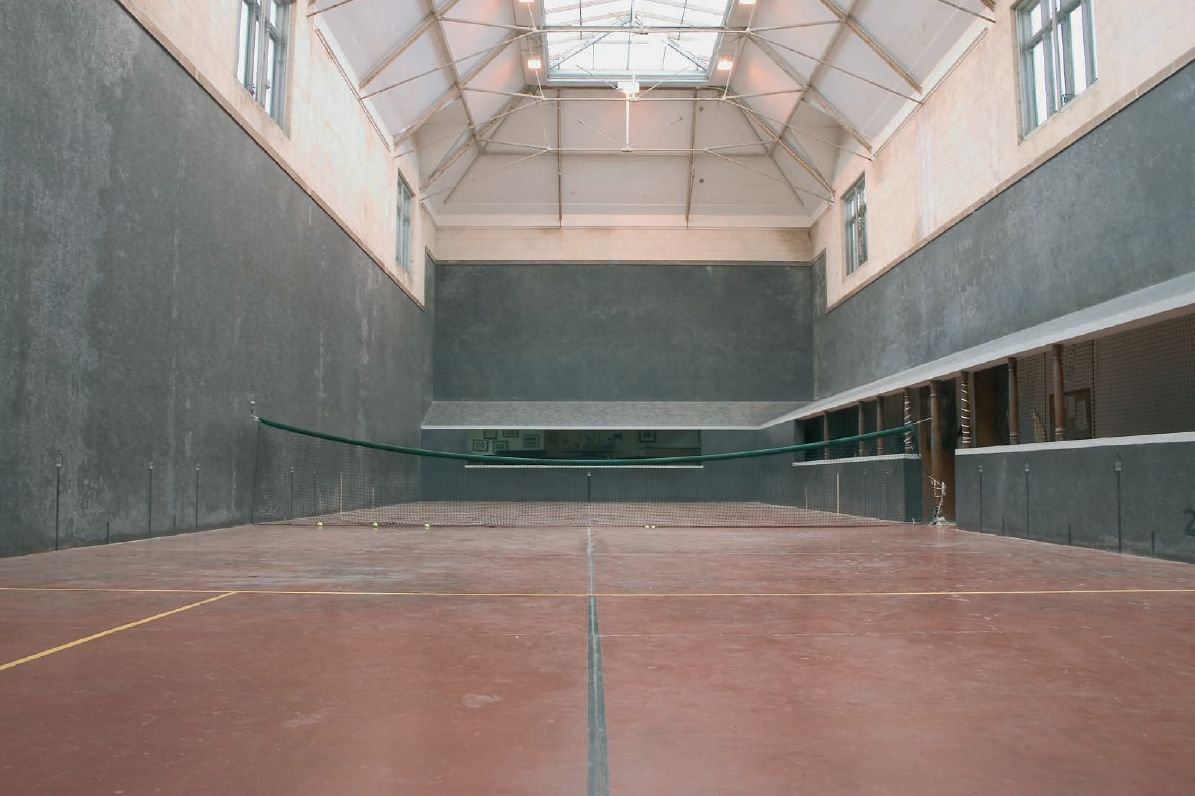
Hardwick House

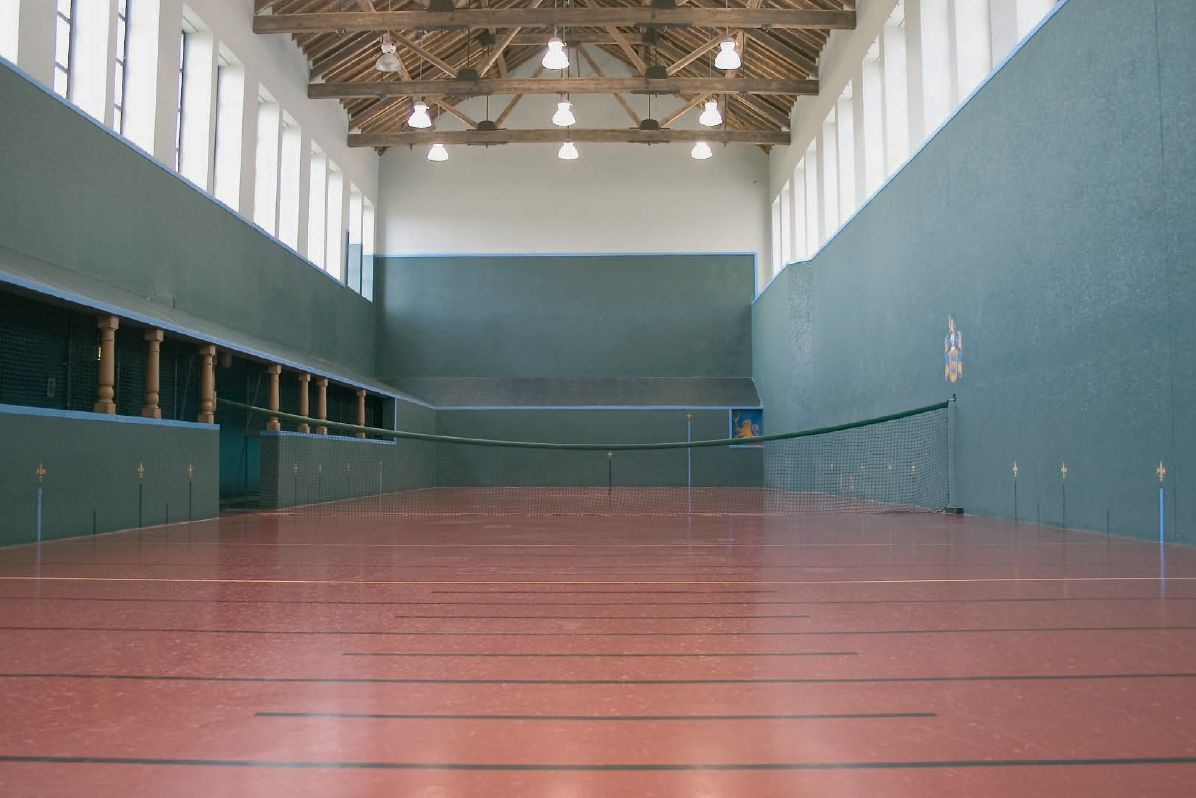
Hyde

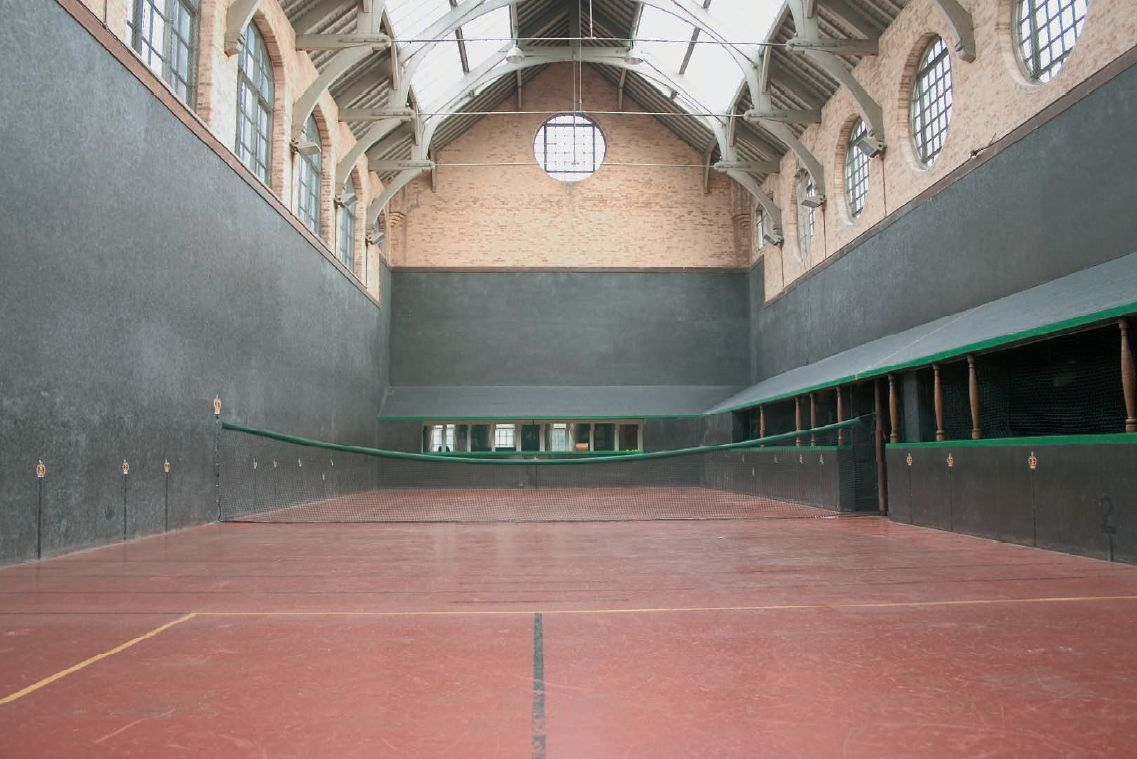
Jesmond Dene

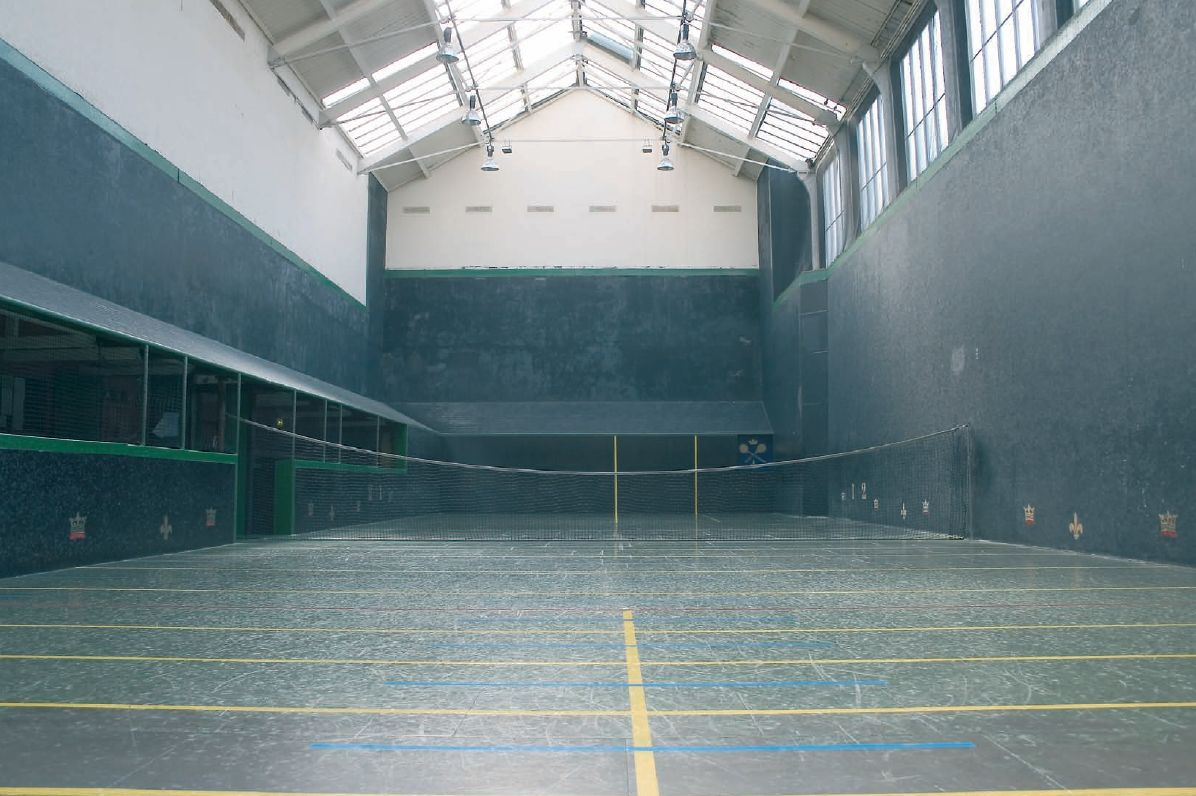
Manchester

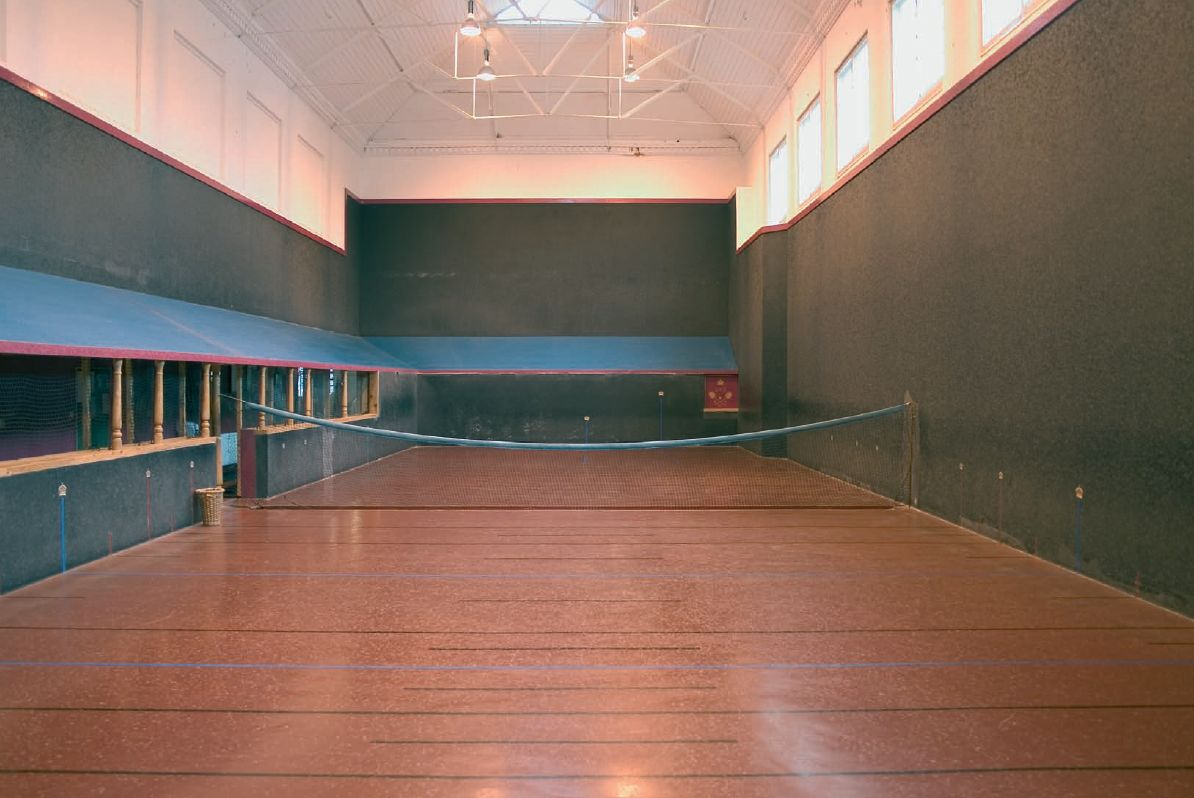
Newmarket and Suffolk

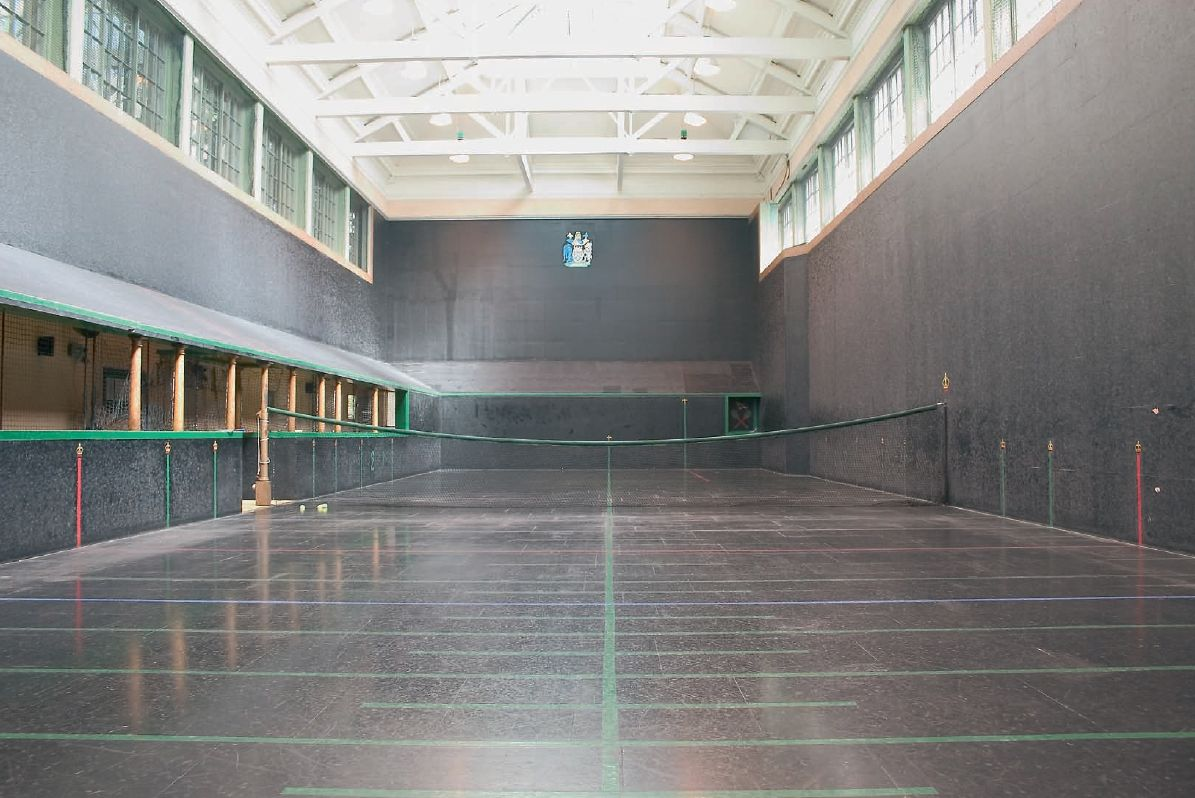
Petworth House

Real tennis organizations: a list of associations and clubs for the sport of real tennis.

== General ==
- International Real Tennis Professionals Association
- Ladies Real Tennis Association

== Australia ==
5 courts are in use, with 1 currently closed.

Governing body:

- Australian Real Tennis Association

Sporting clubs with own courts:

- Ballarat Tennis Club, Ballarat, Victoria: 1 court in use
- Hobart Real Tennis Club, Hobart, Tasmania: 1 court in use
- Royal Melbourne Tennis Club, Melbourne, Victoria: 2 courts in use
- Sydney Real Tennis Club, Sydney, New South Wales: 1 court in use

Other Sporting clubs:

- Melbourne Cricket Club (MCC) Real Tennis Section, Melbourne, Victoria

Currently closed club:

- Cope-Williams Real Tennis Club, Romsey, Victoria

Defunct clubs:

- Macquarie University Real Tennis Club, Sydney, Australia: 10 courts; Red and green clay and Plexicushion
- Real Tennis Perth, Perth, Western Australia

== France ==
Three real tennis courts are in use; four trinquet courts are in use in south-west France.

Governing body:

- Comité Français de Courte-Paume (French Real Tennis Committee)

Sporting clubs:

- Jeu de paume et squash Bordeaux-Mérignac, Bordeaux: 1 court in use
- Cercle du jeu de paume de Fontainebleau, Fontainebleau: 1 court in use
- Société sportive du jeu de paume et de racquets, Paris: 1 court in use
- Trinquet St. André, Bayonne: 1 trinquet court in use
- Trinquet Gartxot, La Bastide-Clairence: 1 trinquet court in use
- Association du jeu de paume de Navarre, Parc Beaumont, Pau: 1 trinquet court in use
- Trinquet Dongaitz, Urrugne: 1 trinquet court in use

There is also a plan to restore a court currently in an unplayable condition in Chinon:

== Ireland ==
No courts are in use, with two in unplayable condition.

Governing body:

- Irish Real Tennis Association

Courts:

- Lambay Island
- Trinity College Dublin

== Netherlands ==
No courts are in use, with one in unplayable condition.

Governing body:

- Nederlandse Real Tennis Bond (Netherlands Real Tennis Association)

Sporting clubs:

- Real Tennis Club Huis ter Kleef, Haarlem: historic court in need of restoration

== United Kingdom ==
Twenty-eight courts are in use. There is also a court in unplayable condition in Troon, Scotland.

Governing body:

- Tennis and Rackets Association

Sporting clubs:

- Bristol and Bath Tennis Club, Bristol: 1 court in use
- Falkland Palace Royal Tennis Club, Falkland, Fife, Scotland: 1 quarré court in use
- Hardwick House, Whitchurch-on-Thames, Oxfordshire: 1 court in use
- Hatfield House Tennis Club, Hatfield, Hertfordshire: 1 court in use
- Hyde Tennis Club, Bridport, Dorset: 1 court in use
- Jesmond Dene Tennis Club, Jesmond, Newcastle upon Tyne, Northumberland: 1 court in use
- Leamington Tennis Court Club, Leamington Spa, Warwickshire: 1 court in use
- Manchester Tennis and Racquet Club, Salford, Greater Manchester: 1 court in use
- Marylebone Cricket Club, St John's Wood, London: 1 court in use
- Moreton Morrell Tennis Court Club, Moreton Morrell, Warwickshire: 1 court in use
- Newmarket and Suffolk Real Tennis Club, Newmarket, Suffolk: 1 court in use
- Petworth House Real Tennis Club, Petworth, Sussex: 1 court in use
- Prested Hall Racket Club, Feering, Essex: 2 courts in use
- Queen's Club, West Kensington, London: 2 courts in use
- Royal County of Berkshire Real Tennis Club, Holyport, Berkshire: 1 court in use
- Royal Tennis Court, Hampton Court Palace, Richmond upon Thames, London: 1 court in use
- Seacourt Tennis Club, Hayling Island, Hampshire: 1 court in use

Private estate:

- The Fairlawne Estate, Plaxtol, Kent: 1 court (private)

Schools and Universities with own courts:

- Cambridge University Real Tennis Club, Cambridge, Cambridgeshire: 2 courts in use
- Canford School, Wimborne Minster, Dorset: 1 court in use
- Middlesex University Real Tennis Club, Hendon, London: 1 court in use
- Oratory Tennis Club, Reading, Berkshire: 1 court in use
- Oxford University Real Tennis Club, Oxford, Oxfordshire: 1 court in use
- Radley College, Radley, Oxfordshire: 1 court in use
- Wellington College Real Tennis Club, Crowthorne, Berkshire: 1 court in use

Universities which play at other courts:

- University of Exeter Real Tennis and Rackets Club, Exeter, Devon (currently plays at Hyde Tennis Club)
- University of Durham Real Tennis Club, Durham, Newcastle upon Tyne (currently plays at Jesmond Dene Tennis Club)
- Newcastle University Real Tennis Club, Newcastle upon Tyne (currently plays at Jesmond Dene Tennis Club)
- University of St. Andrews Real Tennis Club (currently plays at Falkland Palace Royal Tennis Club)
- University of York Real Tennis Club, York (currently plays at Jesmond Dene Tennis Club)

== United States ==
Ten courts are in use.

Governing body:

- United States Court Tennis Association and U.S. Court Tennis Preservation Foundation

Sporting clubs:

- Aiken Tennis Club, Aiken, South Carolina: 1 court in use
- Tennis and Racquet Club, Boston, Massachusetts: 1 court in use
- Racquet Club of Chicago, Chicago, Illinois: 1 court in use
- International Tennis Club of Washington, McLean, Virginia: 1 court in use
- National Tennis Club, Newport, Rhode Island: 1 court in use
- Racquet and Tennis Club, New York, New York: 2 courts in restricted use
- Racquet Club of Philadelphia, Philadelphia, Pennsylvania: 1 court in use
- Tuxedo Club, Tuxedo, New York: 1 court in use

Private estates:

- Greentree, Manhasset, New York: court has since been removed

Schools and Universities:

- Georgian Court University. Lakewood, New Jersey: 1 court in use

== See also ==
- Jeu de paume
- Longue paume
