= Brighton, Hove & District Football League =

- Founded: 1903
- Folded: 2015
- Country: England
- Feeder to: Sussex County League Division Three
- Domestic cup(s): Brighton College Cup; President's Cup; A.W. Bridle Knock-Out Trophy; John Whittington Jubilee Cup; Gentry Bowl; Coronation Cup; Supplementary Trophy
- Last champions: Hair Razors (2013–14)
- Website: bhdfl.co.uk

The Brighton, Hove & District Football League was a football competition involving teams in and around Brighton, Hove and Worthing, in England. The league was established in 1903 and reached ten divisions in size by 1967. However, with the number of clubs slowly decreasing and the league reduced to only two divisions between 2011 and 2013, a merger with the Worthing & District League began in 2014, initially with a combined Premier Division. The merger was completed in 2015 with the establishment of the Brighton, Worthing & District League.

Prior to the league's disbanding, winners of the Premier Division were able to apply for promotion to the Sussex County League.

== Champions ==
Season	Division One	Division Two	Division Three	Division Four						
1922–23	Allen West	Brighton & Hove Ramblers	Patcham	Hove Athletic						
1923–24	Brighton Railway Athletic	Robins' Athletic	Hove YMCA	Kingston Athletic						
1924–25	19th Field Brigade RA	Southdown Athletic	Kingston Athletic	George Street Old Boys' Association						
1925–26	Robins' Athletic	Yale Athletic	St Mark's Old Boys	Hove Seaside Villas						
1926–27	Haywards Heath	Gas Company Athletic	Shoreham St Mary's							
1927–28	Hove St Andrews	Yale Athletic	Lewes Road Old Boys	Hove White Rovers						
Season	Division One	Division Two	Division Three A	Division Three B	Division Four					
1928–29	Bexhill II	Lewes Road Old Boys	Brighton Celtic	Hove St Leonard's	BB Old Boys' Association					
Season	Division One	Division Two	Division Three	Division Four						
1929–30	Lewes Road Old Boys	Shoreham St Mary's	BB Old Boys' Association	Hove III						
1930–31	Brighton Tramways	Allen West	Hove III							
1931–32	Brighton Mental Hospital	Hove III	Crescent Athletic							
1932–33	Eastbourne Comrades	Norton Athletic	Vernon Athletic II							
1933–34	Brighton Mental Hospital	Steyning	Moulscombe							
1934–35	Belgravia Dairies Sports	Piddinghoe	Brighton Boys' Club (Old Boys)							
1935–36	Brighton Mental Hospital	Moulscombe	Hove White Rovers							
1936–37	Belgravia Dairies Sports	Lewes II	Aldrington Ramblers							
1937–38	Brighton Mental Hospital	Hove White Rovers	Queens Park							
1938–39	Belgravia Dairies Sports	Steyning	Brighton Insurance							
1945–46	Portslade St Andrews									
1946–47										
1947–48	Lancing	Vernon Athletic	Nilton Athletic	Whitehawk & Manor Farm Old Boys						
1948–49	Brighton Old Grammarians	West Hove	Lancing II	NALGO						
Season	Senior Division	Intermediate Division	Junior Division One	Junior Division Two	Junior Division Three	Junior Division Four				
1949–50	Skyways	Whitehawk & Manor Farm Old Boys	Shoreham United	St Luke's Old Boys	Vale Rovers					
1950–51	Skyways	West Hove	Broadwater	Vale Rovers	Portslade Gas Works					
1951–52	Whitehawk & Manor Farm Old Boys	Shoreham II	Peacehaven	Spartan Athletic	Patcham					
1952–53	West Hove	East Grinstead II	Whitehawk II	Brighton Old Grammarians II	Pavilion Athletic	Brighton & Hove Banks				
Season	Senior Division	Intermediate Division One	Intermediate Division Two	Junior Division One	Junior Division Two	Junior Division Three				
1953–54	Uckfield	Whitehawk II	Ringmer	Hove County Old Boys Association	Seaford II	Underwood Sports				
Season	Senior Division	Intermediate Division One	Intermediate Division Two	Intermediate Division Three	Junior Division One	Junior Division Two	Junior Division Three			
1954–55	Eastbourne United II	Shoreham United	Hove County Old Boys Association	Falmer	Brighton & Hove Banks	Brighton Phoenix	Woodingdean			
1955–56	Eastbourne United II	Newhaven II	Regal Athletic	Hove White Rovers III	Rottingdean	Woodingdean	Alliance Sports Club			
1956–57	Eastbourne United II	Regal Athletic	Kemp Town	Woodingdean	Lewes St Mary's	Alliance Sports Club	Worthing Old Grammarians II			
Season	Division One	Division Two	Division Three	Division Four	Division Five	Division Six	Division Seven	Division Eight	Division Nine	Division Ten
1957–58	West Hove	Whitehawk III	East Side Rovers	West Hove II	Alliance Sports Club	West Hove III	Falmer II			
1958–59	Whitehawk II	Lewes II	West Hove II	Alliance Sports Club	St Wilfrid's Old Boys	East Side Rovers II	Woodingdean II			
1959–60	Eastbourne United II	Old Varndeanians II	Old Aircorians	St Wilfrid's Old Boys	Marine Athletic	Brighton Insurance	Boys Brigade Old Boys			
1960–61	Whitehawk II	Old Aircorians	East Side Rovers	Allen West	Shoreham United II	Boys Brigade Old Boys	Brighton Boys Club Old Boys	Mile Oak		
1961–62	Lewes II	Shoreham United	Lewes St Mary's	Bishopstone	Boys Brigade Old Boys	Brighton Boys Club Old Boys	Queens Park Rovers	Underwood Sports		
1962–63	League abandoned due to bad weather during January and February 1963									
1963–64	Whitehawk II	Peacehaven	Bexhill Town Athletic II	Lewes YMCA	Ringmer II	Brighton Boys Club Old Boys II	Hove County Old Boys Association II	BISON II		
1964–65	Lewes II	Hove County Old Boys Association	Lewes YMCA	Lewes III	Brighton Boys Club Old Boys	Queens Park Rovers	Lower Bevendean Old Boys	Jaycee Sports	East Moulsecoomb	
1965–66	Southwick II	Hassocks	Hurstpierpoint	Mile Oak	Southwick III	Lower Bevendean Old Boys	East Moulsecoomb	Marmion Centre (YMCA)	Lower Bevendean Old Boys II	
1966–67	Southwick II	Newhaven Olympics	Brighton Boys' Club Old Boys	Lower Bevendean Old Boys	Mayfield	Marmion Centre	Whitehawk Boys' Club	Hollingdean Park Rangers	Saltdean United	
1967–68	Southwick II	World's End	Lower Bevendean Old Boys	Mayfield	Patcham Athletic II	Hassocks II	Hollingdean Park Rangers	East Moulsecoomb II	Buxted II	Brighton Boys' Club II
1968–69	Peacehaven	Lower Bevendean Old Boys	Buxted	Southwick III	Peacehaven II	Lower Bevendean Old Boys II	High Hurstwood	Brighton Boys' Club II	Ditchling II	Whitehawk Boys' Club II
1969–70	Lower Bevendean Old Boys	Patcham Athletic	Hanover Athletic	Queens Park Athletic	Lower Bevendean Old Boys II	High Hurstwood	Brighton Boys' Club II	Lewes St Mary's II	Whitehawk Boys' Club II	Iford II
1970–71	Moulsecoomb Rovers	Portslade Athletic	Sussex University	East Moulsecoomb	Marmion Centre	Iford	Lewes St Mary's II	Alliance II	Lower Bevendean Old Boys III	Brighton Ramblers
1971–72	Hassocks	Sussex University	Portslade	Marmion Centre	Iford	Brighton Insurance	Brighton Ramblers	SERPO	Whitehawk Boys' Club	Kingstonians
Season	Premier	One	Two	Three	Four	Five	Six	Seven	Eight	Nine
1972–73	Moulsecoomb Rovers	Portslade	Mile Oak	Brighton Ramblers	Hollingbury	Portslade II	Whitehawk Boys' Club	Mile Oak II	Kingstonians	Sayers Common
1973–74	Old Varndeanians	Mile Oak	Brighton Ramblers	Saltdean United	Hanover Athletic II	Whitehawk III	Mile Oak II	Brighton Ramblers II	Brighton Insurance II	67' Centre
1974–75	Hanover Athletic	Brighton Ramblers	Saltdean United	Hanover Athletic II	Atlanta Royals	Kingstonians	Brighton Ramblers II	St Francis Hospital II	Estudiantes	British Radio Corporation
1975–76	Brighton Ramblers	Sussex Police	Patcham Athletic II	AFC Royals	Brighton Ramblers II	Sayers Common	Brighton Electricity	Mile Oak III	Grove Celtic	Kingstonians II
1976–77	Franklands Village	Hurstpierpoint	AFC Royals	Upper Beeding	East Moulsecoomb	Hurstpierpoint II	Newick Nomads	Marmion Centre II	MD Sports	
1977–78	Brighton Ramblers	AFC Royals	East Moulsecoomb	SERPO	Newick Nomads	Merlin	British Radio Corporation	TMB Celtic	Poynings II	
1978–79	Franklands Village	Hassocks II	Hove Tudor	MD Sports	Brighton Rangers	Legal & General Assurance (Hove)	Poynings II	AFC Falcons		
1979–80	Rottingdean	Hove Tudor	MD Sports	Ditchling	AFC Falcons	Brighton Rangers II	Saltdean United II	Stanmer Park Rowdies		
1980–81	Mile Oak	Patcham (1903) II	Upper Beeding	67' Centre	Goldstone	Stanmer Park Rowdies	Westdene Wombats	Segas II		
1981–82	Rottingdean	Seaford Town	67' Centre	Waggon Rangers	Westdene Wombats	Mile Oak III	Seaford Town II	Hove Venture		
1982–83	AFC Falcons	Portslade	Stanmer Park Rowdies	Brighton Electricity	Hove Venture	Swan Valley Casuals	Buckingham Wanderers	Westdene United II		
1983–84	AFC Falcons	Stanmer Park Rowdies	Brighton Rangers	Saltdean United II	Grenadier	Buckingham Wanderers	Southern Music	Jaycee Sports		
1984–85	AFC Falcons	Brighton Rangers	Woodmancote	Grenadier	STC Brighton	Hove Royal British Legion	Brighton Electricity II	Saltdean United III		
1985–86	AFC Falcons	Brighton Electricity	Burgess Hill Athletic	Southern Music	Old Paleedyans	SV Carpentry	Brighton Insurance II	Ericsson		
1986–87	Portslade	University of Sussex	Westdene II	Preston Dynamos (Rottingdean) II	AFC Falcons II	Brighton Electricity II	Crown & Anchor			
1987–88	AFC Falcons	Grenadier	Preston Dynamos (Rottingdean)	AFC Falcons II	Ericsson	Hurstpierpoint III	Crown & Anchor II			
1988–89	Weatherbeaters HI	Brighton Boys' Brigade Old Boys	AFC Falcons (Bevendean)	American Express	Saltdean United III	Jaycee Sports	Sussex County Rangers II			
1989–90	AFC Falcons (Lower Bevendean)	Duracell	Mile Oak II	Sussex County Rangers	Hartwells Athletic	Barclays Bank	Adur Athletic			
1990–91	AFC Falcons (Lower Bevendean)	La Roma	Patcham (1903)	Hartwells Athletic	Grenadier II	American Express II	Cock & Bottle	Brighton Rangers II		
1991–92	AFC Falcons	Endsleigh Athletic	Brighton Electricity	Grenadier II	American Express II	The Hollingbury	Montpelier Villa	Brighton Post Office Youth		
1992–93	AFC Falcons	Patcham (1903)	AFC Bensleys	The Hollingbury	Lower Bevendean	AFC Peacehaven	Stanmer Athletic II	Erib ETL		
1993–94	University of Sussex	Rutland	International Factors	Madison Tigers	Montpelier Villa	Hove Streamline United	Jaycee Sports	Seaford Town III		
1994–95	AFC Falcons	Barclays (Brighton)	Montpelier Villa	Downs Athletic	Jaycee Sports	Seaford Cinque Ports	Brighton Sports II			
1995–96	AFC Falcons	Montpelier Villa	Hanover	Hove Streamline United	Lion & Unicorn	Prima	Southern Rangers Old Boys II			
1996–97	Patcham (1903)	Bevendean Social	Brighton Sports	Prima	AFC St Georges	Sussex County Rangers III				
1997–98	AFC Falcons	AJC Beaufort	Lower Bevendean	AFC St Georges	Woods	International Factors II				
1998–99	Midway (1948)	Legal & General (Hove)	AFC St Georges	Autopaints (Brighton)	O'Donovans	Meridian Athletic				
1999–00	Old Varndeanians	AFC St Georges	Whitehawk Veterans	Old Varndeanians II	Meridian Athletic	Ericsson II				
2000–01	Old Varndeanians	Harbour View	Meridian Athletic	Brighton Electricity	Ricardo	Real Brunswick				
2001–02	Royal Sovereign	Whitehawk Vets	South Central Wanderers	Lower Bevendean Reserves	Marquess of Exeter	Shoreham United				
2002–03	Old Varndeanians	Hanover	Brighton Electricity	FC Midlothians	Shoreham United	Master Tiles				
2003–04	Hanover	Portslade Athletic	Master Tiles	Brighton 1664	AFC Stadium					
2004–05	Hanover	Master Tiles	Brighton 1664	Blue House	Rottingdean United Reserves	American Express Reserves				
2005–06	Rottingdean Village	Blue House	Ovingdean	Brighton Rangers Reserves	American Express Reserves					
2006–07	Hanover	Real Brunswick	Church of Christ the King	Teamstats.net	Buckingham Arms					
2007–08	American Express	Church of Christ the King	Brighton North End	Hikers BHA	Crew Club Sports					
2008–09	Brighton Electricity	Hikers BHA	Crew Club Sports	Peacehaven Good Companions	Orb360					
2009–10	Montpelier Villa	Falmer Falcons	Orb360	Montpelier View Reserves						
2010–11	Montpelier Villa	Hair Razors	Chailey	Midway						
2011–12	Hair Razors	British School of Motoring								
2012–13	Hair Razors	TMG								
2013–14	Hair Razors	South Coast City	Boys Brigade Old Boys Reserves							
