= Macquarie University Real Tennis Club =

Real tennis club in Sydney, Australia

Coordinates: 33.775259°S 151.112915°E

The Macquarie University Real Tennis Club played real tennis at Macquarie University in Sydney, Australia at a court built in the 1990s, but converted into a childcare centre seven years later. The Sydney Real Tennis Club, which had previously played at courts in Melbourne, Hobart and Ballarat also played at the Macquarie court.

The university facility no longer supports real tennis, but offers synthetic grass, clay, and hard courts for lawn tennis. Three courts are Italian Red Clay, one is American Green Clay, and six are hard courts (Plexicushion, as is used at the Australian Open).

== See also ==
- List of real tennis organizations
- List of tennis venues
