= Oval Raceway =

Motor racing circuit in West Sussex

Coordinates: 50.837°N 0.471°W

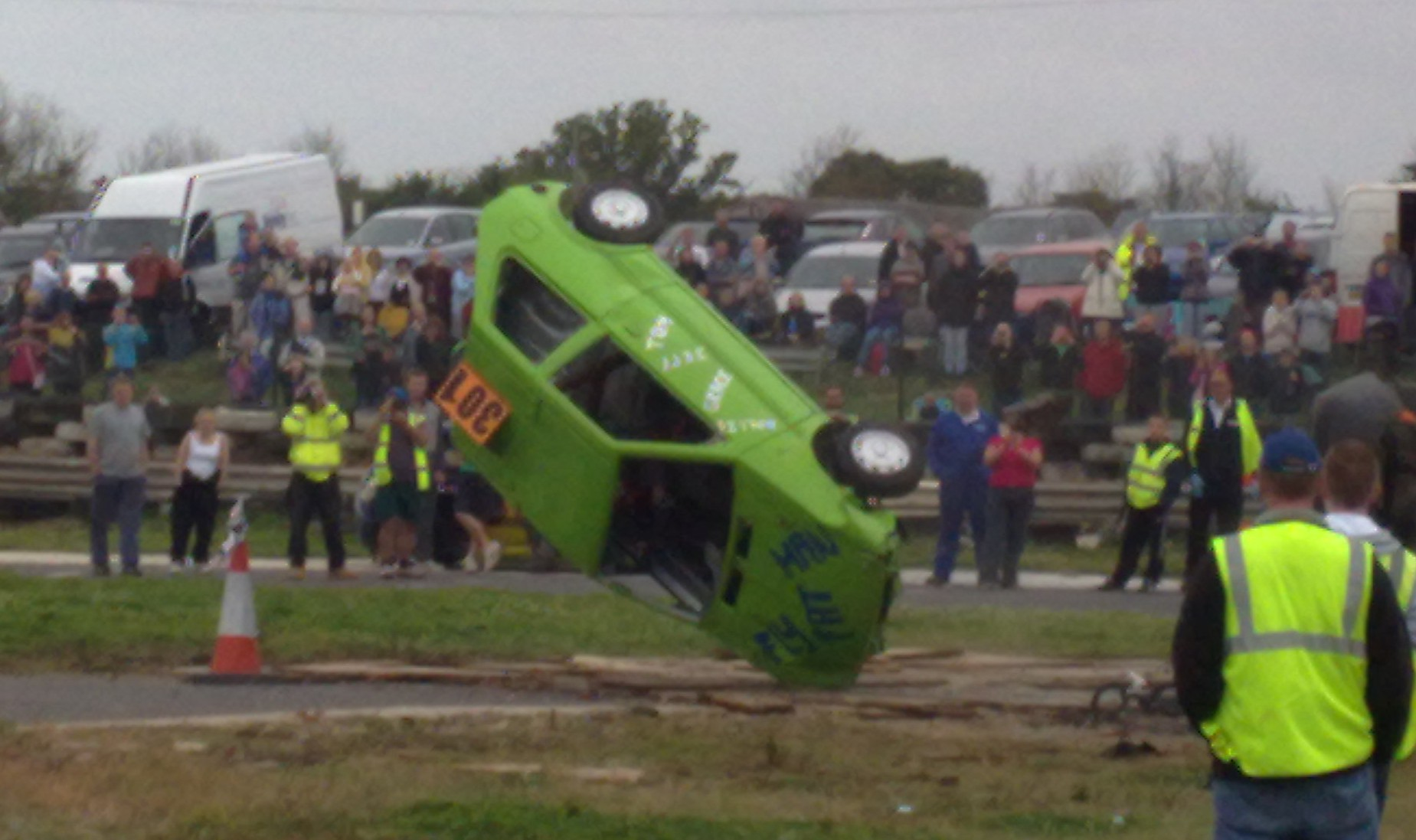
Car in mid flight from car jump at Oval Raceway

The Oval Raceway, also known as the Angmering Motor Sports Centre or Angmering Raceway, was a motor racing circuit on the outskirts of Angmering, near Worthing, West Sussex, UK, that closed on Sunday 27 November 2022 to make way for a new housing development.

The 25-acre (100,000 m^{2}) site was started by local man Jim Hazelgrove and was focused on a 0.25 miles (0.40 km) concrete banked oval track, inside which was a smaller circuit for go-karts, mini motos and pit bikes. The main track primarily hosted stock car, hot rod and banger racing, as well as special events such as demolition derbies, caravan racing and car jumps.

== Types of racing ==
The primary type of racing at the track was the racing of stock cars on the banked concrete oval, with a number of subdivisions including hot rods, saloon stock cars and bangers.

There were also races for specialist classes such as classic stock cars.
