= Worthing and District Football League =

English football league

The Worthing and District Football League was a football competition based in Sussex, England.

For the 2014–15 season the league was absorbed into the Brighton, Hove & District Football League.

== Recent Division Winners ==
Season	Premier Division	Division One	Division Two	Division Three
2000–01	GSK Sports	The Brunswick	The Globe	LA Dolphins
2001–02	Warren Sports	West Worthing WMC	Durrington RAFA	Adur Athletic
2002–03	Sompting	Goring St.Theresa's	L&S Athletic	East Worthing
2003–04	GSK Sports	Revenue	East Worthing	Worthing Rebels
2004–05	GSK Sports	Adur Athletic	Worthing Albion	Adur Athletic Reserves
2005–06	Worthing Wanderers	Northbrook	L&S Athletic Reserves	Shoreham RBL
2006–07	L&S Athletic	Jolly Brewers	Shoreham RBL	Worthing Wanderers Reserves
2007–08	L&S Athletic	Warren Sports Reserves	Fern Estates	Athletico Wenban-Smith
2008–09	L&S Athletic	GSK Sports Reserves	Ferring Reserves	(no competition)
2009–10	Ferring	Worthing Leisure	Broadwater Cricket Club	(no competition)
2010–11	Worthing Leisure	Goring Rangers	Worthing BCOB Reserves	(no competition)
2011–12	Sompting	L&S Athletic Reserves	AFC Boundstone	(no competition)
2012–13	L&S Athletic	Goring	Sompting Reserves	(no competition)
2013–14	Worthing Leisure	George & Dragon	Broadwater Cricket Club	(no competition)

== Recent Cup Winners ==
Season	Charity Cup	Mike Smith Trophy	Walmsley Cup	Benevolent Cup	Croshaw Cup	Division Three Trophy
2000–01	Sompting	Maple Leaf Rangers	Flex United	(no competition)	Tabernacle Reserves	LA Dolphins
2001–02	Northbrook	Northbrook	Tabernacle Reserves	Woodside	West Worthing WMC Reserves	Woodside
2002–03	Sompting	GSK Sports	Worthing Athletic	East Worthing	GSK Sports Reserves	East Worthing
2003–04	GSK Sports	Revenue	St Mary's	The Globe Reserves	Revenue Reserves	GSK Sports 'B'
2004–05	Worthing Wanderers	Worthing Wanderers	East Worthing	Worthing Wanderers Reserves	Adur Athletic Reserves	RJ Cleaning
2005–06	Revenue	Worthing Wanderers	Durrington RAFA	Shoreham RBL	Adur Athletic Reserves	Shoreham RBL
2006–07	Warren Sports	Worthing Wanderers	Adur Athletic Reserves	TMG	(no competition)	Worthing Wanderers Reserves
2007–08	Worthing Athletic	L&S Athletic	Fern Estates	Lancing United 'B'	Warren Sports Reserves	Athletico Wenban Smith
2008–09	L&S Athletic	Worthing Athletic	GSK Sports Reserves	Ferring Reserves	L&S Athletic Reserves	(no competition)
2009–10	L&S Athletic	Ferring	Worthing Leisure	Broadwater Cricket Club	GSK Sports Reserves	(no competition)
2010–11	Ferring Reserves	Worthing Leisure	Real Rustington	Adur Athletic Reserves	Worthing BCOB Reserves	(no competition)
2011–12	L&S Athletic	Sompting		Goring Cricket Club	KSG Chaplain Athletic Reserves	(no competition)
2012–13	Worthing Leisure	Worthing Leisure	Worthing Leisure Reserves	Maybridge	Adur Athletic	(no competition)
2013–14	Goring	Sompting	George & Dragon	AFC Romans	(no competition)	(no competition)

== See also ==
- Sport in Worthing
