= Place du Jeu de Balle =

Square in Brussels, Belgium

Place du Jeu de Balle (French); Vossenplein (Dutch)
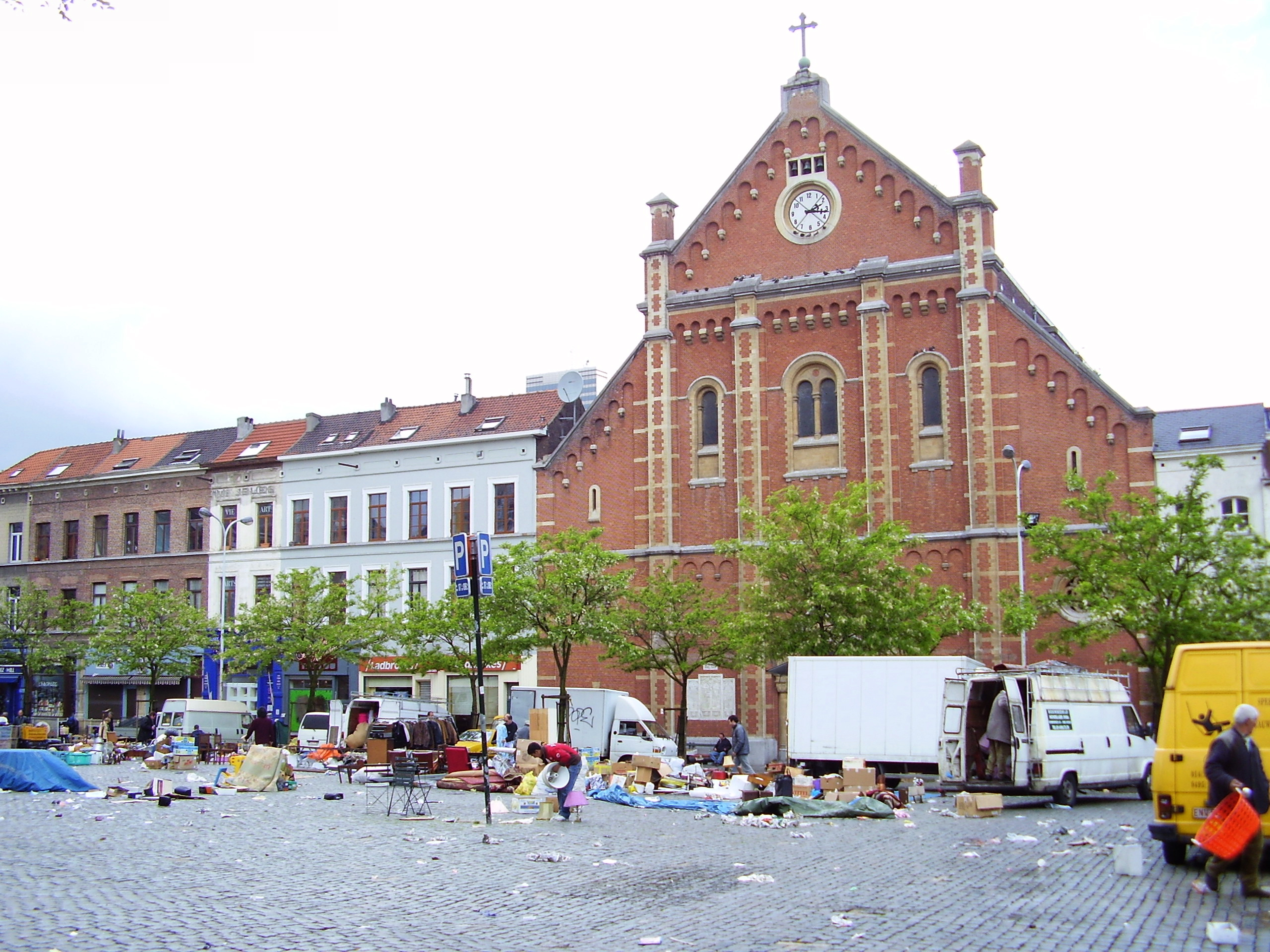
- End of a market on the Place du Jeu de Balle/Vossenplein

- Location within Brussels Location within Belgium
- Type: Square
- Location: City of Brussels, Brussels-Capital Region, Belgium
- Quarter: Marolles/Marollen
- Postal code: 1000
- Nearest metro station: 2 6 Porte de Hal/Hallepoort
- Coordinates: 50°50′13″N 04°20′44″E

Construction
- Commissioned: 1853
- Construction start: 1858
- Completion: 1863

The Place du Jeu de Balle (French, pronounced [plas dy ʒø d(ə) bal]; "Ball Game Square") or Vossenplein (Dutch, pronounced [ˈvɔsə(m)ˌplɛin]; "Foxes' Square") is a square in the heart of the Marolles/Marollen district of Brussels, Belgium. Since 1873, it has held a famous flea market, known as the Old Market.

The area around the square is characterised by the presence of restaurants and typical Brussels cafés. It can be accessed from Brussels-Chapel railway station, the metro and premetro (underground tram) station Porte de Hal/Hallepoort (on lines 2, 4, 6 and 10), as well as the bus stop Jeu de Balle/Vossenplein (on lines 48 and 52).

== Toponymy ==
As its French name indicates, the Place du Jeu de Balle (lit. 'Ball Game Square') was originally intended for the practice of balle pelote or jeu de balle, a traditional ball game similar to Frisian handball that was particularly popular in 19th-century Brussels. Its Dutch name, Vossenplein (lit. 'Foxes' Square'), refers to the Société du Renard (lit. 'Fox Company'; vos meaning "fox" in Dutch), a former locomotive and machinery factory established in 1837, whose site the square was built on, and to which the Rue des Renards/Vossenstraat is nowadays the only other reference.

== History ==
The Place du Jeu de Balle was laid out in 1853, at the same time as the neighbouring Rue Blaes/Blaestraat. The factory was purchased by the City of Brussels in 1853 and demolished in 1858 following the completion of the Rue Blaes. The new square incorporated parts of the former industrial site, with the Rue des Renards/Vossenstraat forming its north side and the Rue de la Rasière/Sistervatstraat its south. The work was completed in 1863, coinciding with the construction of the fire station of the Brussels Fire Department.

In 1873, Brussels' municipal council decided to transfer the daily flea market, known as the Old Market (French: Vieux Marché, Dutch: Oude Markt), which, in the words of a municipal councillor, "considerably harmed the appearance of the new central boulevards", from the Place Anneessens/Anneessensplein to the Place du Jeu de Balle, a function the square has kept to this day. A public bathhouse, designed by the architect Émile Hellemans, was built at the centre of the square in 1902–03, which was later replaced by a larger complex in the nearby Rue du Chevreuil/Reebokstraat.

In the 1960s, redevelopment plans for the Marolles/Marollen district proposed by the architect Robert Courtois envisioned new housing blocks and green spaces while preserving the square and the Rue Blaes. The plans were partially implemented but revised in 1979 to favour smaller-scale interventions that maintained the historic street layout.

== Notable buildings ==
- The Church of Our Lady of the Immaculate Conception is a Catholic parish church, built from 1854 to 1862 in neo-Romanesque style, which was once part of the Capuchin convent.
- The former fire station of the Brussels Fire Department was built between 1859 and 1860 by the architect Joseph Poelaert in eclectic style. Decommissioned in 1982 during the relocation of the fire brigade staff to the Avenue de l'Héliport/Helihavenlaan in the Northern Quarter, the former barracks now houses apartments, art galleries, and shops, while its former portico entrance has been refurbished into a café.
- A concrete air raid shelter from World War II, equipped with benches, sinks, toilets and urinals, is located under the square. Its entrances were walled up in 1945 and the stairs leading to it were filled in 1960.

== Events and folklore ==
- A flea market takes place on the square every day of the week from 9 a.m. to 2 p.m. and weekends from 9 a.m. to 3 p.m.
- Every year, on 20 July, the eve of Belgian National Day, the National Ball is held there.

== Gallery ==
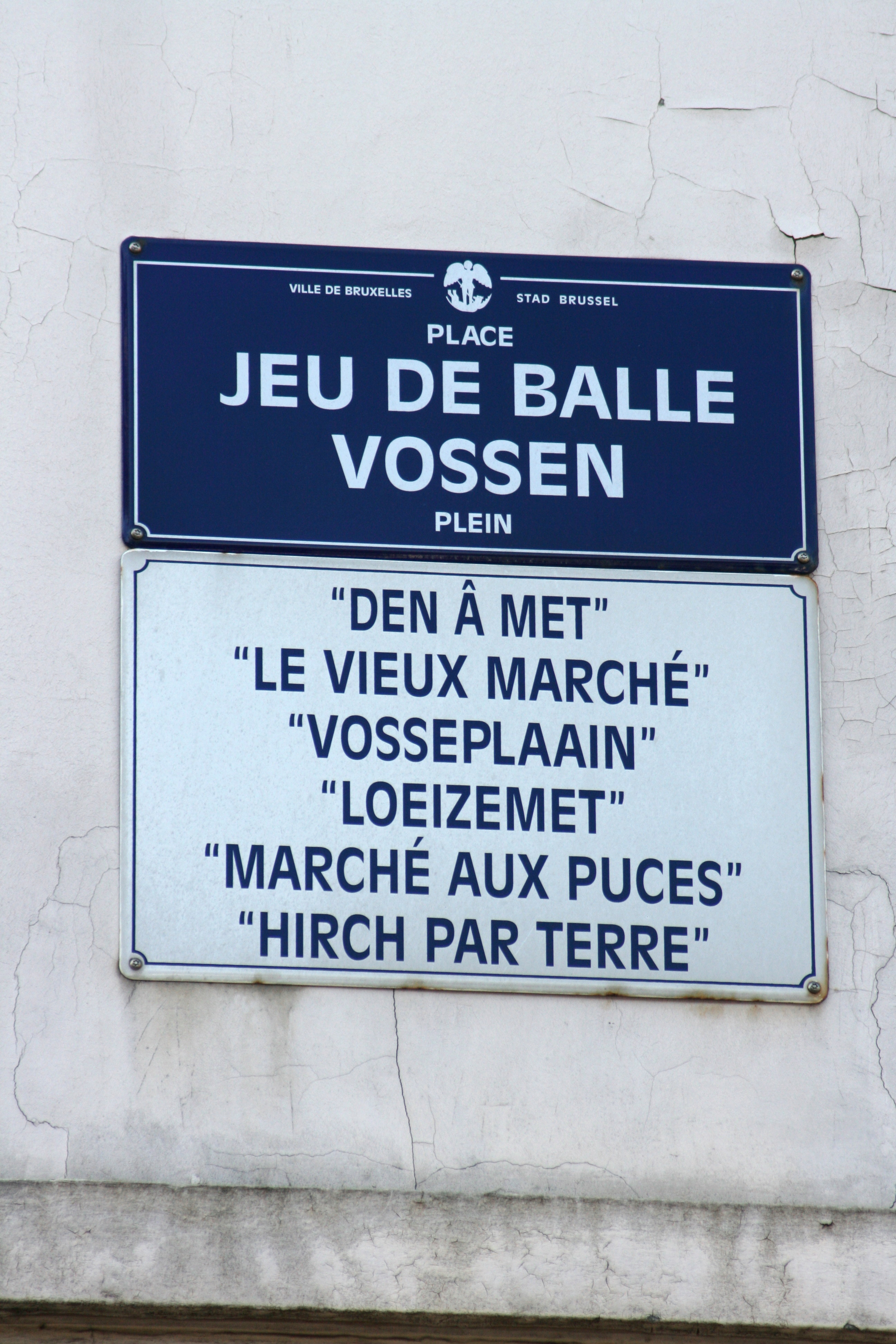
Official names of the square in French and Dutch, followed by popular local names

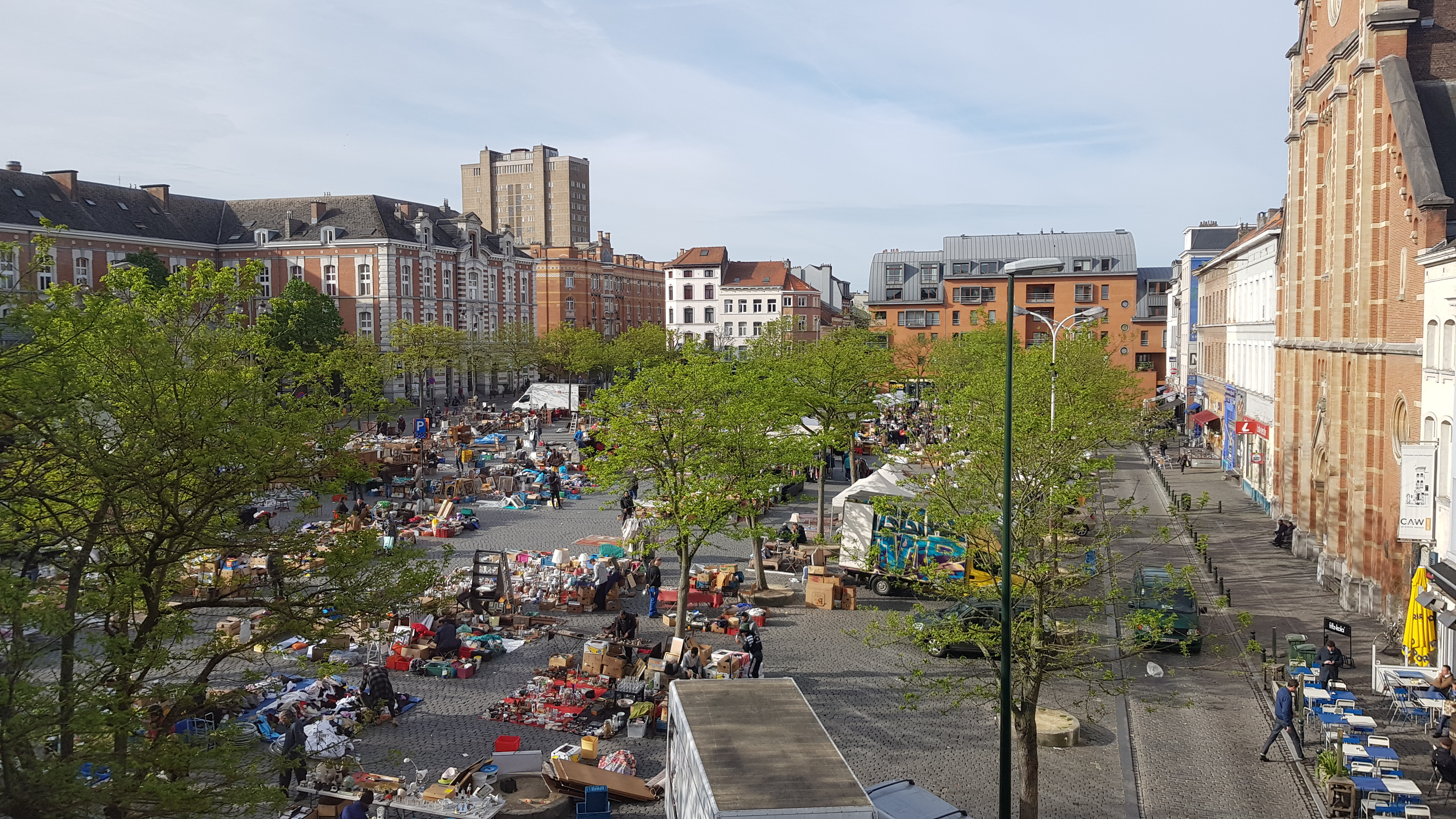
Panoramic view of the square with a flea market taking place

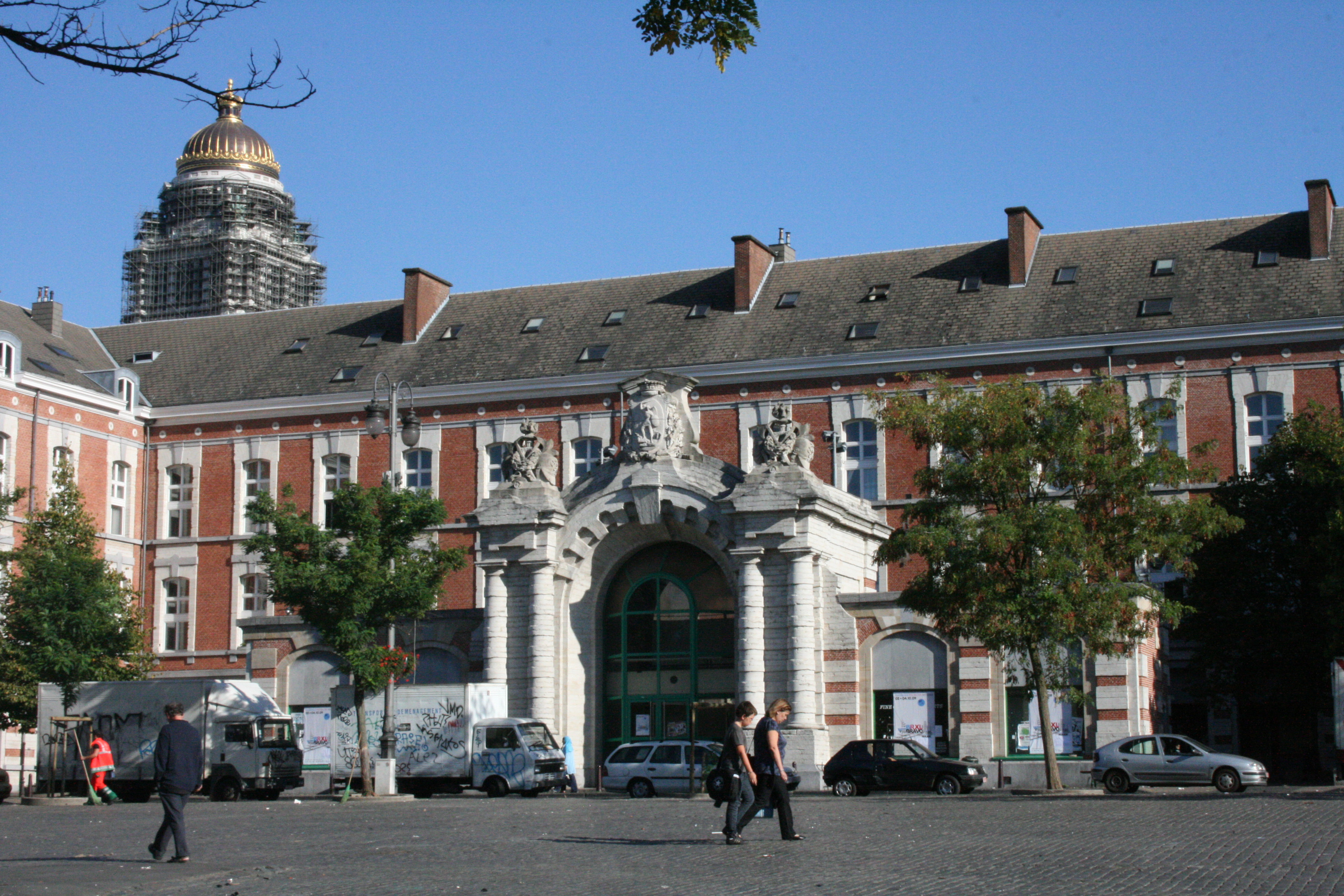
The former fire station of the Brussels Fire Department with its portico entrance. In the background is the Palace of Justice.

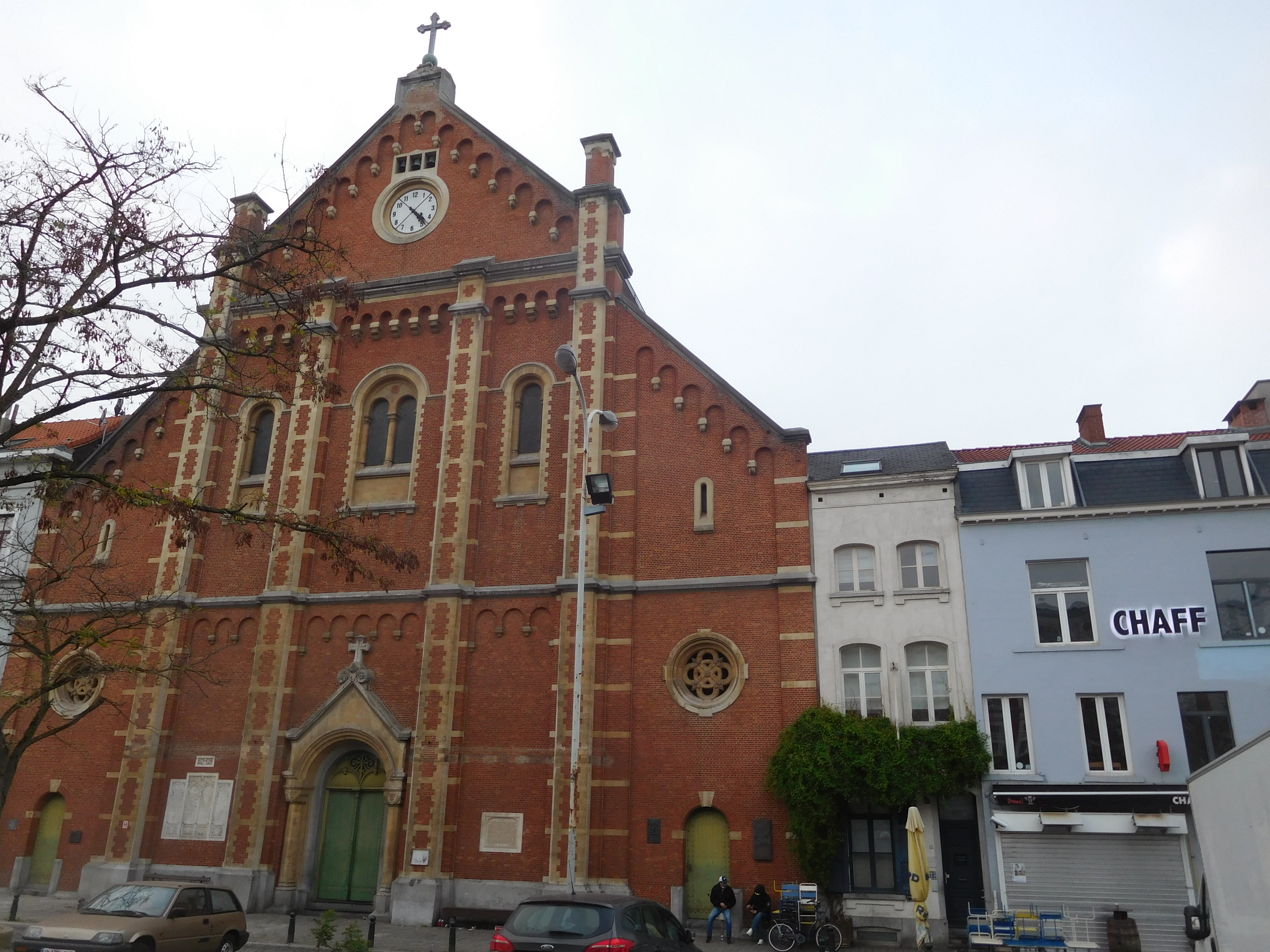
Church of Our Lady of the Immaculate Conception

== See also ==
- History of Brussels
- Belgium in the long nineteenth century
