= Former Palace of Justice, Brussels =

Demolished court building in Brussels, Belgium

Former Palace of Justice of Brussels
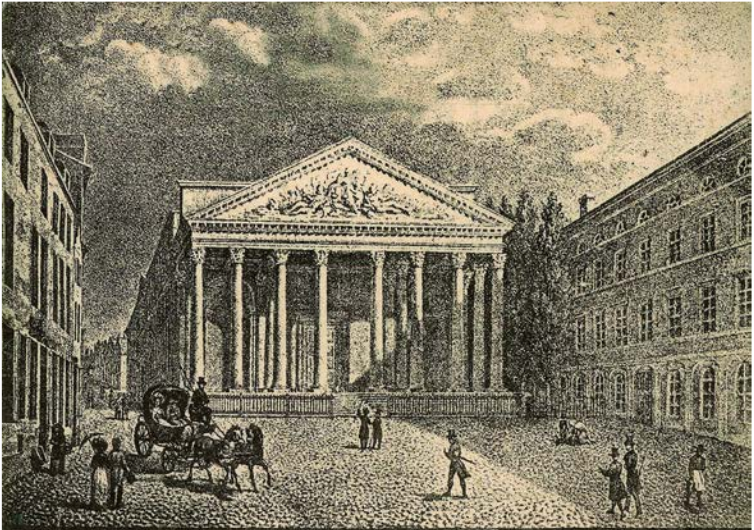
- The former Palace of Justice on the Place du Palais/Paleisplein
- Interactive map of the Former Palace of Justice of Brussels area

General information
- Type: Courthouse
- Architectural style: Neoclassical
- Location: Brussels, Belgium
- Coordinates: 50°50′34″N 4°21′18″E
- Demolished: 1892

Design and construction
- Architect: François Verly

The former Palace of Justice of Brussels was a courthouse in Brussels, Belgium, located on the Place du Palais/Paleisplein (now the Place de la Justice/Gerechtsplein). Designed by the French architect François Verly, it was built between 1818 and 1823, during the time of the United Kingdom of the Netherlands, to house the city's law courts. Following the Belgian Revolution of 1830, it continued to serve as Brussels' principal courthouse until the completion of the current Palace of Justice, designed by the architect Joseph Poelaert and built at a different location, and was demolished in 1892.

== History ==
=== Early history ===
The Palace of Justice was designed by the French architect François Verly, and built from 1818 to 1823, on the site of a former Jesuit church. This neoclassical structure was located in the Sablon/Zavel district, on the Place du Palais/Paleisplein (today's Place de la Justice/Gerechtsplein), between the Rue de l'Empereur/Keizerstraat (today's Boulevard de l'Empereur/Keizerlaan) and the (now-disappeared) Rue d'Or/Guldenstraat.

On the entrance portico, beneath the pediment, the following inscription could be read in large letters: "WILHEMUS PRIMUS BELGARUM REX THEMIDI CONSECRAVIT MDCCCXXIII". After Belgium gained its independence, in 1831, this inscription commemorating King William I of the Netherlands was changed to a very sober "PALAIS DE JUSTICE".

=== Demolition ===
By the mid-19th century, the building had quickly deteriorated and become inadequate for the expanding judicial administration, leading to plans for a larger replacement. It was superseded by the current Palace of Justice, designed by the architect Joseph Poelaert and built between 1866 and 1883 in the Marolles/Marollen district. As for the old courthouse, it was demolished in 1892 to make way for the Rue Lebeau/Lebeaustraat, which leads into the Place de la Justice.

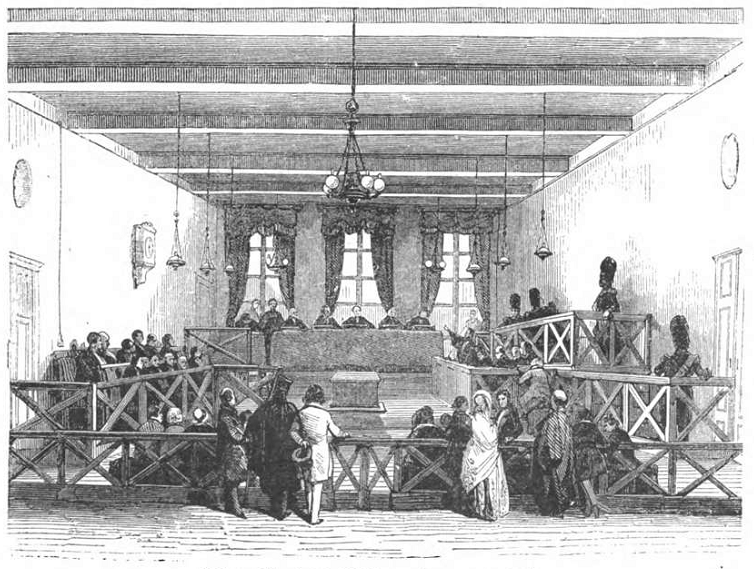
Courtroom of the Court of Assizes in the Palace of Justice (1843)

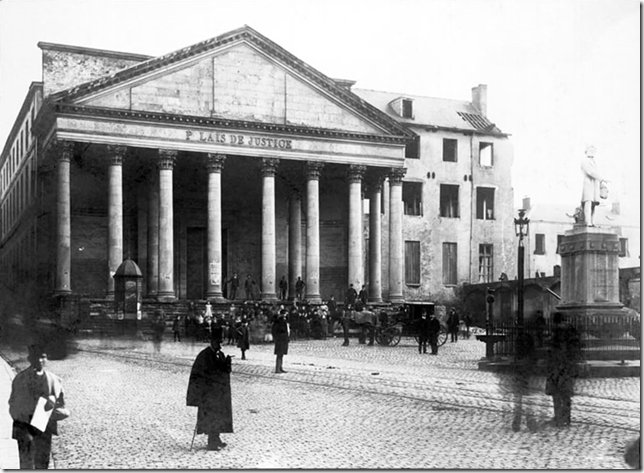
Beginning of the Palace of Justice's demolition (1892)

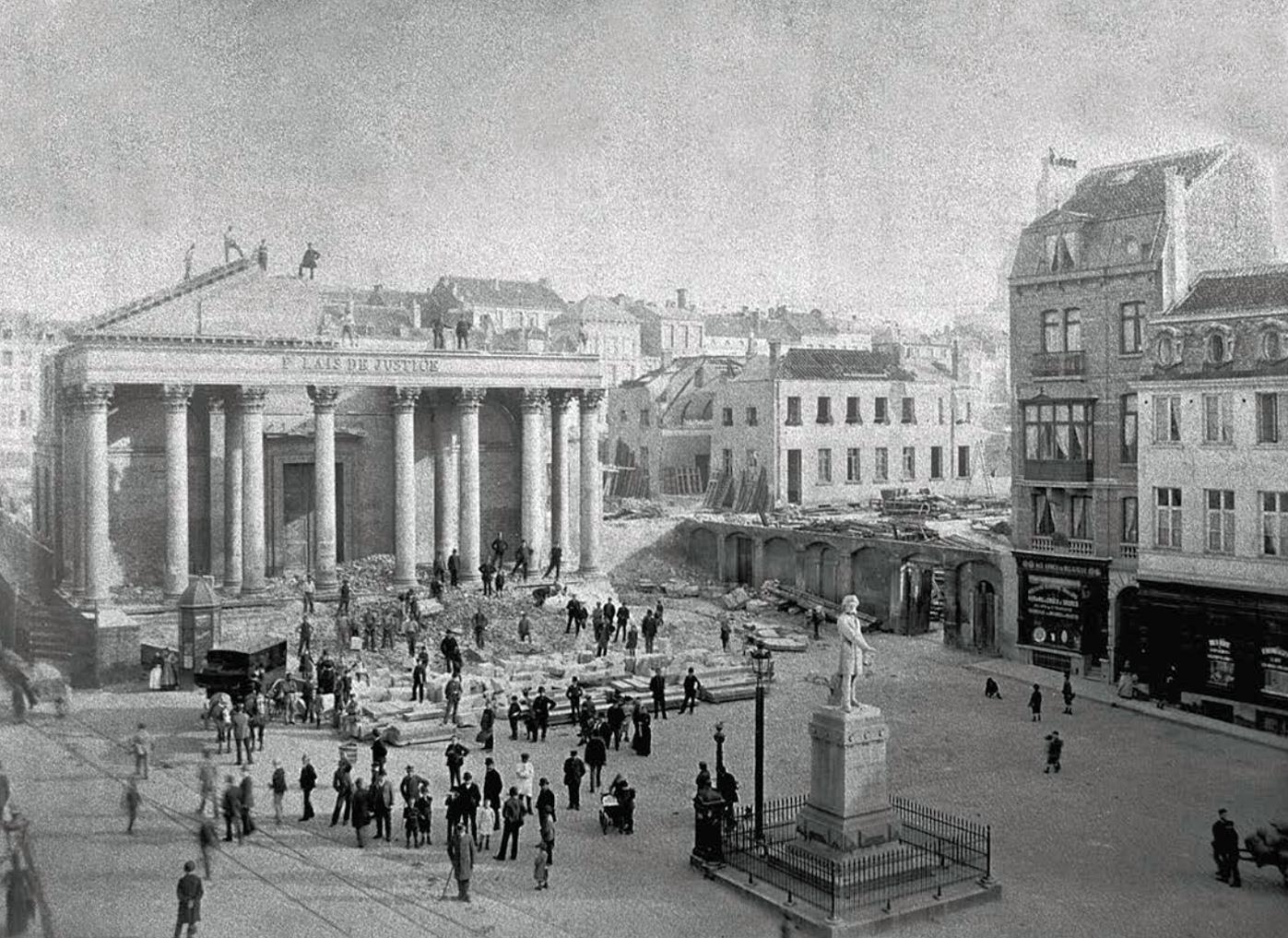
Demolition in progress and construction of the Rue Lebeau/Lebeaustraat (1892)

== See also ==
- Neoclassical architecture in Belgium
- History of Brussels
- Belgium in the long nineteenth century
