= Marollen =

Neighbourhood in Brussels, Belgium

Marollen: Marolles (French); Marollen (Dutch)
- Neighbourhood
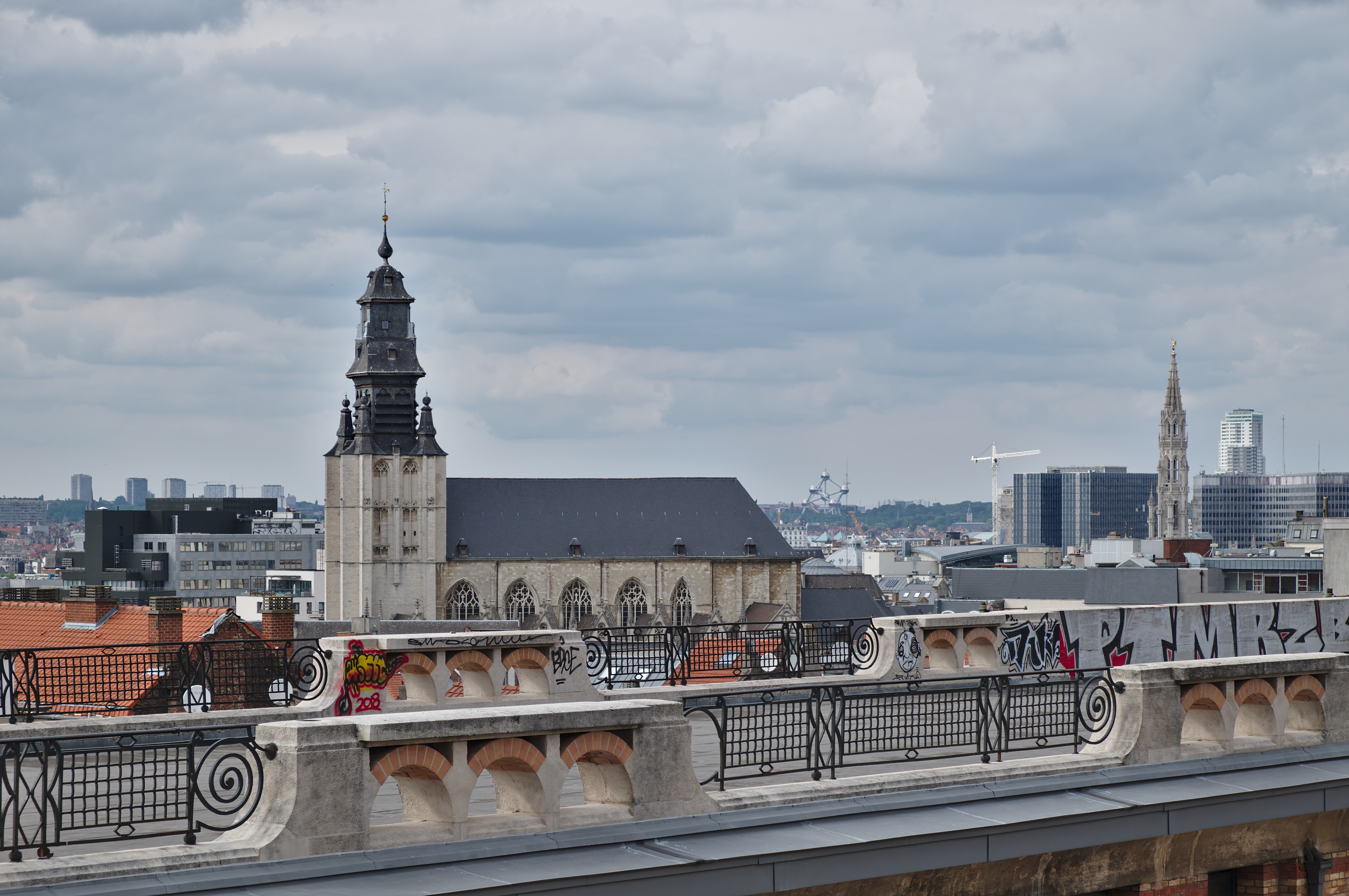
- View of the Marolles/Marollen with the Chapel Church from the Place Poelaert/Poelaertplein

- Location within Brussels Marollen (Belgium)
- Coordinates: 50°50′13″N 4°20′46″E
- Country: Belgium
- Region: Brussels-Capital Region
- Arrondissement: Brussels-Capital
- Municipality: City of Brussels

Population (2011)
  - Total: 11,662
- Time zone: UTC+1 (CET)
  - Summer (DST): UTC+2 (CEST)
- Postal code: 1000
- Area codes: 02
- Website: Official website

The Marolles (French, pronounced [maʁɔl]) or Marollen (Dutch, pronounced [maːˈrɔlə(n)]) is a popular historic neighbourhood of downtown Brussels, Belgium. It is situated between the Palace of Justice to its south-east, the Church of Our Lady of the Chapel to its north and the Halle Gate to its south. Its inhabitants are called Marolliens in French and Marollianen in Dutch.

Lying at the heart of the Marolles are the Place du Jeu de Balle/Vossenplein, home to the Old Market, and the Cité Hellemans collective housing complex. Major arteries of the district include the Rue Haute/Hoogstraat, the Rue Blaes/Blaesstraat and the Rue des Tanneurs/Huidevetterstraat. This area is served by Brussels-Chapel railway station and Brussels-South railway station, as well as by the metro and premetro (underground tram) station Porte de Hal/Hallepoort on lines 2, 4, 6 and 10.

The traditional Brabantian dialect of Brussels, known as Brusselian, and also sometimes referred to as Marollian, was widely spoken in the Marolles until the 20th century. It still survives among a small minority of inhabitants called Brusseleers (or Brusseleirs), many of them quite bi- and multilingual in French and Dutch.

== History ==
=== Early history ===
The area now occupied by the Marolles lay, during the Middle Ages, in the first circumvallation of Brussels. The first mention of a Walsche Plaetse (1328), literally "Walloon Place", probably indicates an early presence of French-speaking traders and craftsmen in the neighbourhood, as it was a logical arrival place for migrants from the south. In 1405, a fire broke out in the neighbourhood and destroyed some 2,400 homes.

At the end of the 16th century, the part of the Marolles crossed by the Rue des Minimes/Minimenstraat, called Bovendael at that time, was frequented by prostitutes. Lepers were also exiled to this area, and from 1691, they were cared for by the Apostoline sisters, a religious congregation from which the toponym Marolles is thought to be derived (from Mariam Colentes in Latin ("those who honour the Virgin Mary"), later contracted to Maricolles/Marikollen, and finally Marolles/Marollen). The sisters' presence was short-lived, as they relocated in 1715 to the Quai au Foin/Hooikaai in the Quays or Sainte-Catherine/Sint-Katelijne Quarter. Their name, however, remained attached to their old district, with the current Rue de Montserrat/Montserratstraat being called Op de Marollen in Brusselian.

In the 17th and 18th centuries, the nobility and the bourgeoisie of Brussels built mansions along the Rue Haute/Hoogstraat. The Marolles became a working class district in the succeeding centuries.

=== 19th century ===
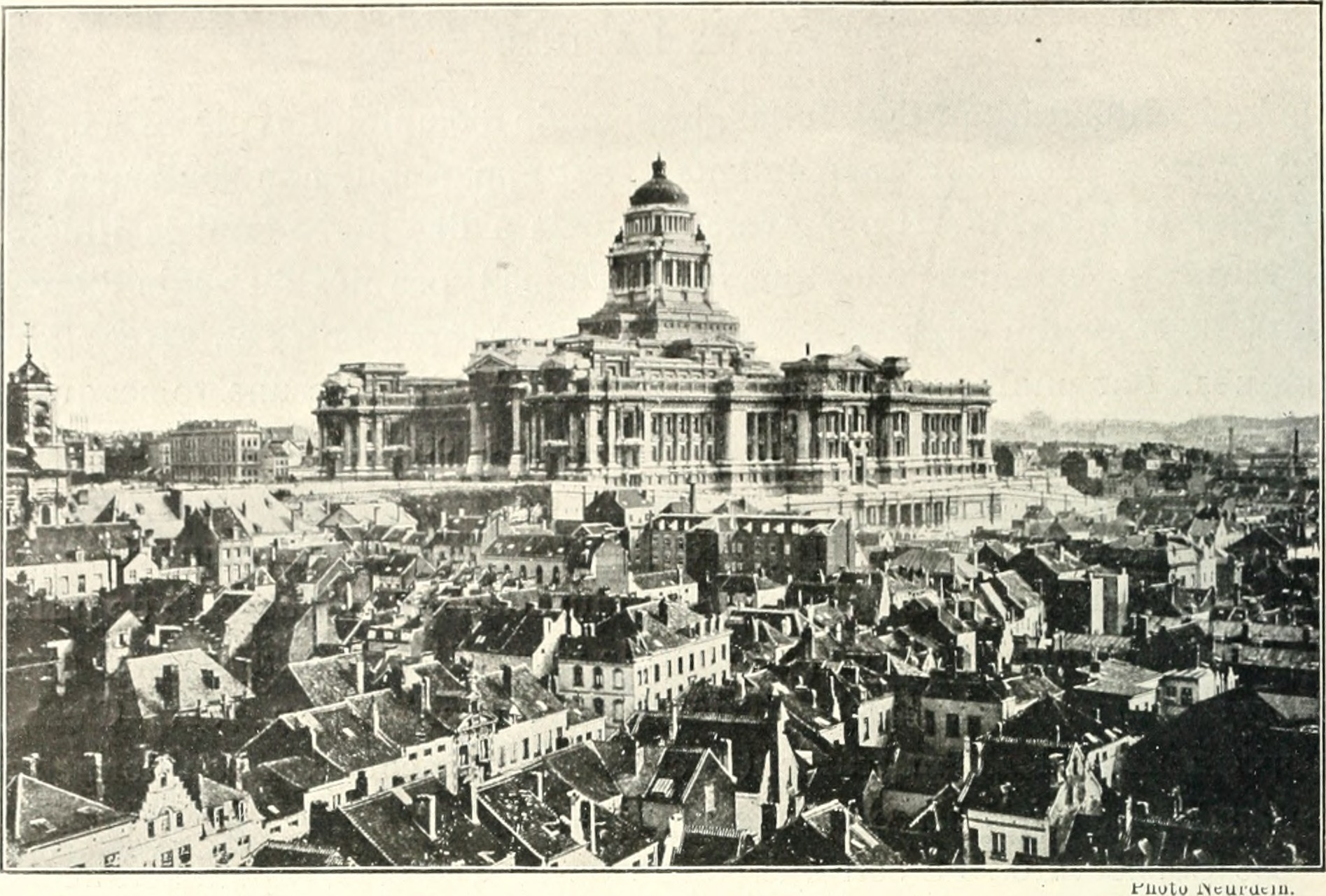
The Marolles/Marollen at the foot of the Palace of Justice, c. 1910

In 1860, during the reign of King Leopold I, a royal decree announced the construction of a new Palace of Justice (the former, located on what is today the Place de la Justice/Gerechtsplein, having quickly deteriorated and exceeded its capacity), and an international architectural competition was organised for its design. After several failed proposals, the then-Minister of Justice Victor Tesch appointed the architect Joseph Poelaert to draw plans of the building in 1861. The first stone was laid on 31 October 1866, and the building was inaugurated on 15 October 1883, four years after Poelaert's death in 1879. The Palace's location is on the Galgenberg hill (French: Mont aux potences; "Gallows Mount"), where in the Middle Ages convicted criminals were hanged, hence its name.

For the Palace of Justice's construction, a section of the Marolles was demolished, while most of the park belonging to the House of Merode was also expropriated. The 75 landlords belonging to the nobility and the high bourgeoisie, many of whom lived in their homes, received large indemnities, while the other more modest inhabitants, about a hundred, were also forced to move by the Belgian government, though they were compensated with houses in the Tillens-Roosendael garden city (French: cité-jardin Tillens-Roosendael) in the Quartier du Chat in the Uccle municipality.

Poelaert himself resided in the Marolles, only a few hundred metres from the building, on the Rue des Minimes, in a house adjoining his vast offices and workshops and communicating with them. It is thus unlikely he saw himself as ruining the neighbourhood. Nonetheless, many angry citizens personally blamed Poelaert for the forced relocations, and the expression schieven architect (meaning "shameful architect") became one of the most serious insults in the dialect of the Marolles.

=== 20th and 21st centuries ===
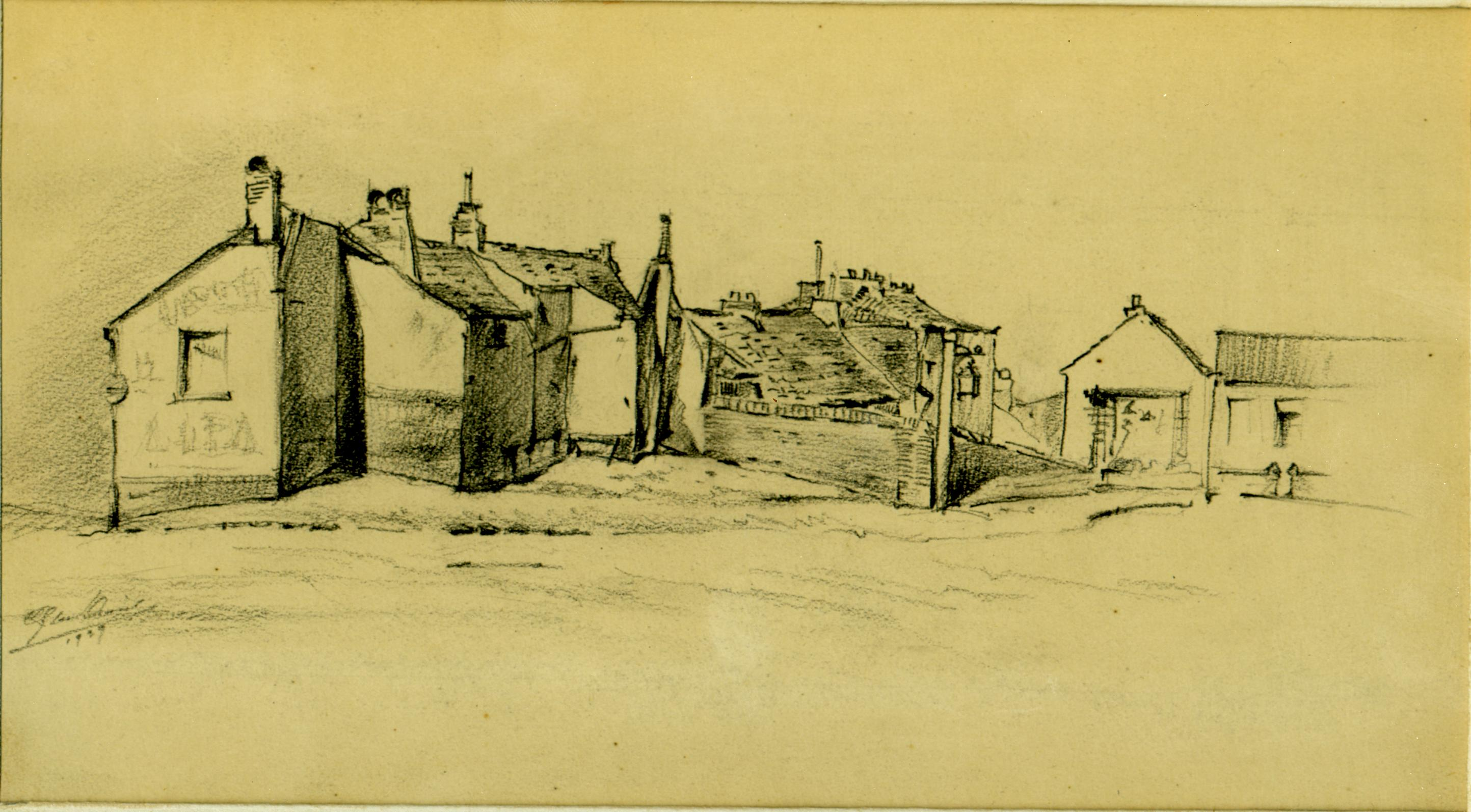
Sketch of the Marolles in 1939 by Léon van Dievoet

Many Jews resided in the neighbourhood before the first Nazi arrests and deportations in the summer of 1942. Many of them had arrived there after fleeing the pogroms that accompanied the 1905 Russian Revolution, with others following between 1933 and 1938, after Hitler's accession to power in Germany. At that time, their population was estimated at about 3,000 people. A first synagogue had been built on the Rue de Lenglentier/De Lenglentierstraat, where a commemorative plaque now recalls the deportations. At the end of the war, a mock funeral procession for Hitler was held in the Marolles, during which funds were raised to support the victims of Auschwitz.

In some areas of the Marolles, the ensuing poverty left its mark on the urban landscape and scarred the social life of the community, leading to rising crime rates and pervading cultural intolerance. In 2006, riots began in this area. However, from the Place de la Chapelle/Kapellemarkt to the Place du Jeu de Balle/Vossenplein, where a daily flea market known as the Old Market has been held since 1873, along the Rue Haute/Hogestraat and the Rue Blaes/Blaestraat, second-hand and popular shops have for some years given way to antique dealers, marking a profound transformation of the district.

== Sights ==
- The Church of Our Lady of the Chapel or Chapel Church, a Gothic Roman Catholic church dating from the 12th–13th centuries.
- The Halle Gate, the only remaining gate in a series that allowed passage inside the second walls of Brussels.
- The Rue Haute/Hoogstraat, one of the city's longest and oldest streets, follows the course of an old Gallo-Roman road, and runs along St. Peter's Hospital, which was itself built in 1935 on the site of a leprosarium.
- The Palace of Justice, the most important court building in Belgium, also reputed to be the largest building constructed in the 19th century.
- The Cité Hellemans, an example of an early 20th-century collective housing complex, was built to replace the neighbourhood's many squalid cul-de-sacs.
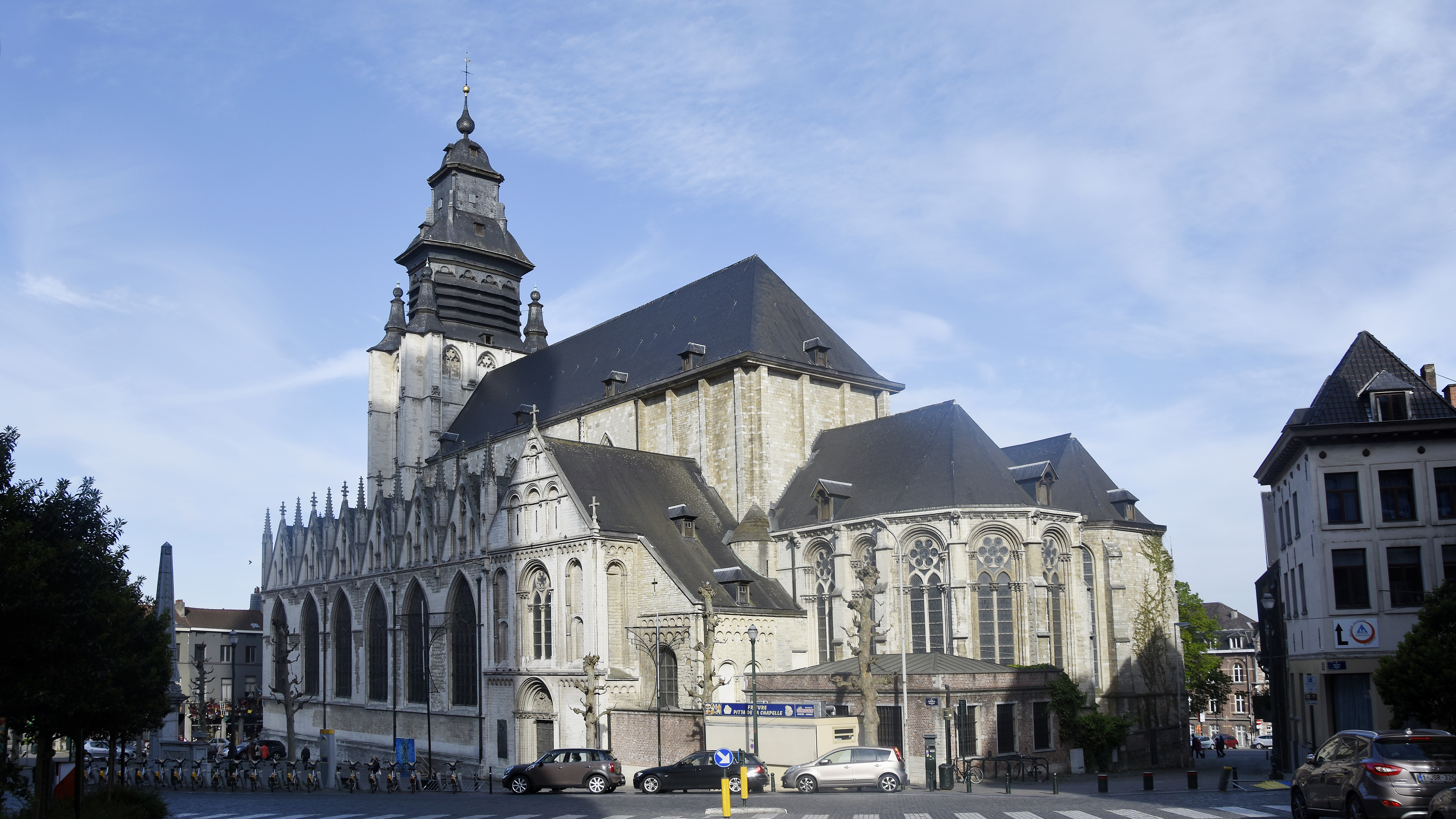
Church of Our Lady of the Chapel

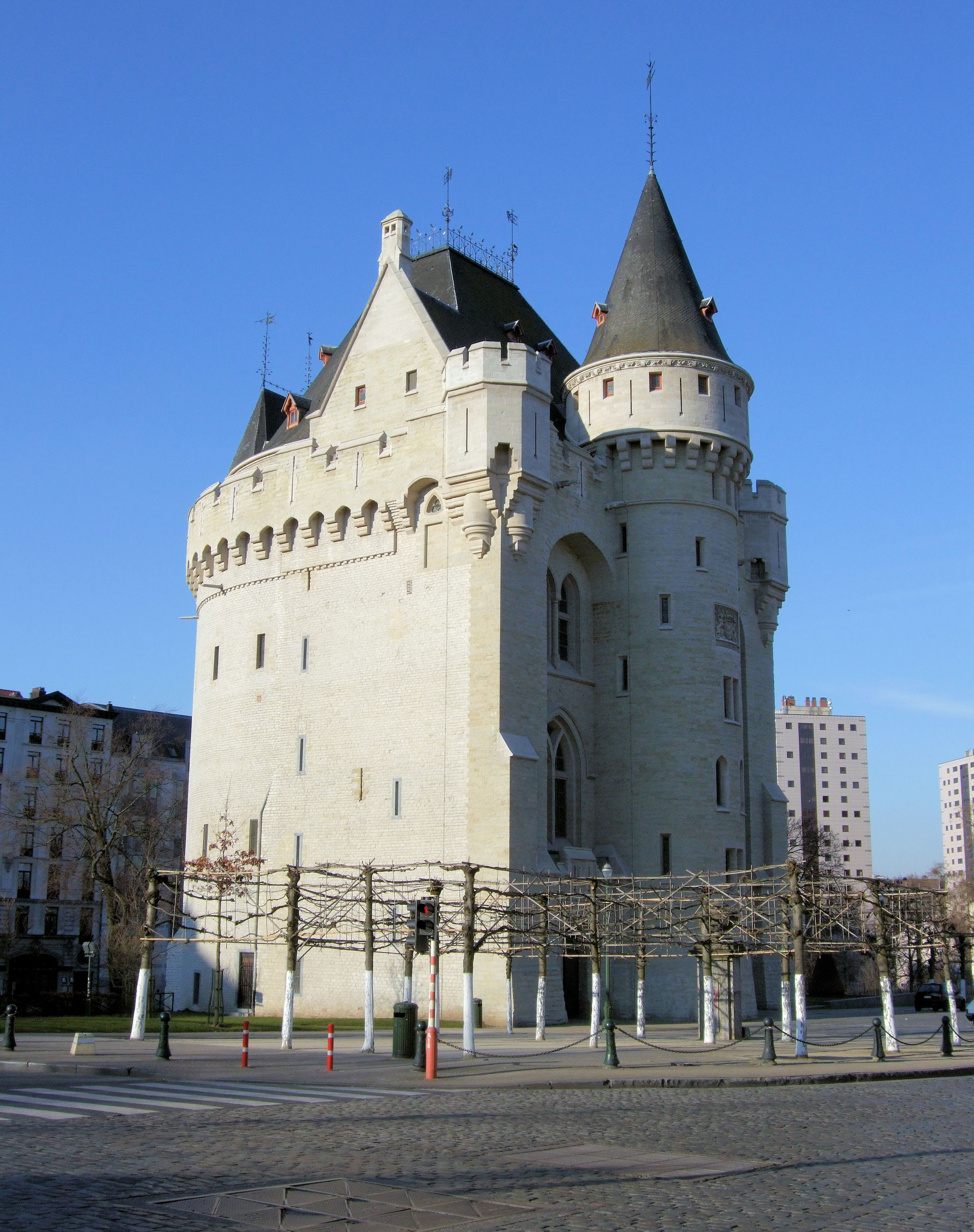
Halle Gate

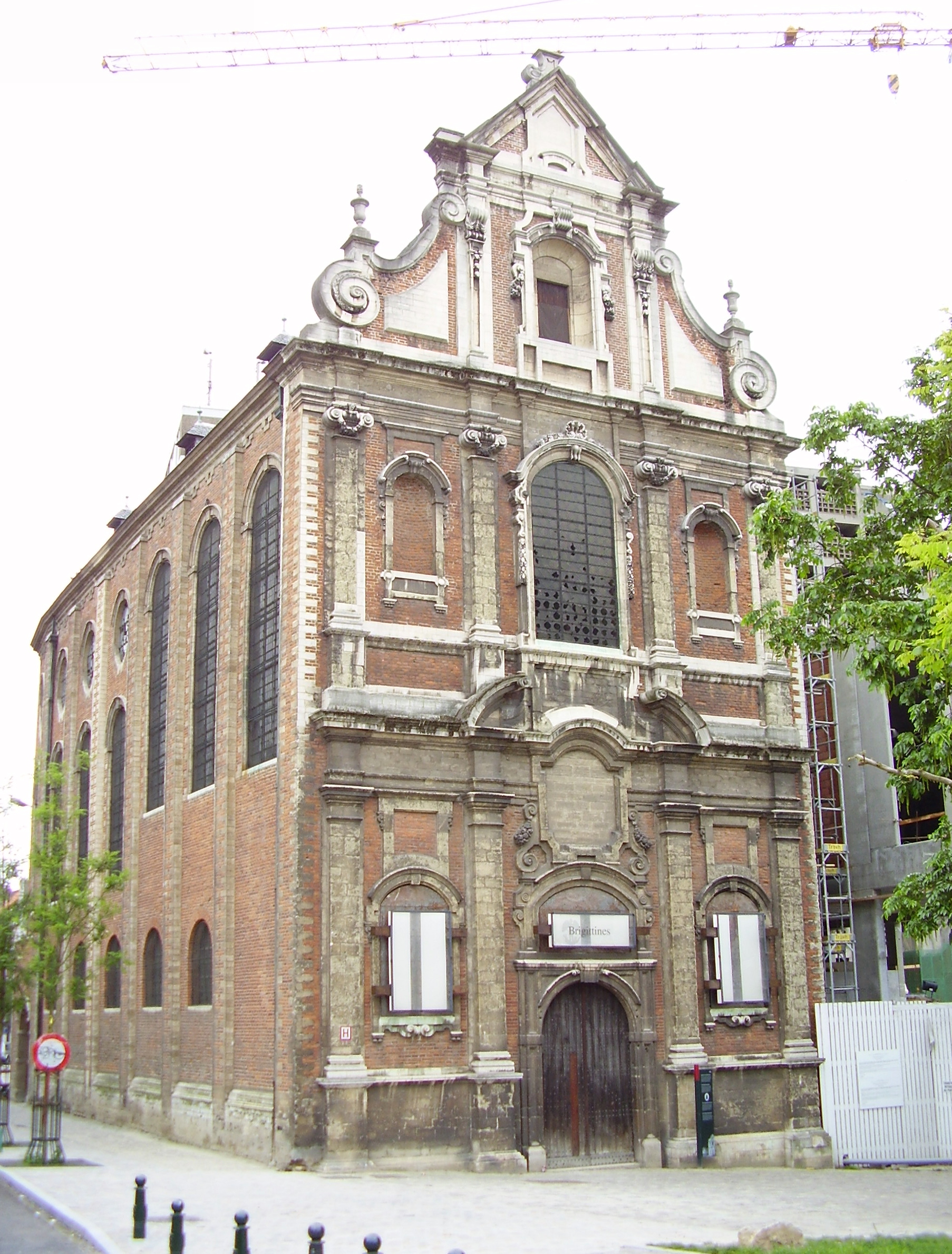
Brigittines Chapel

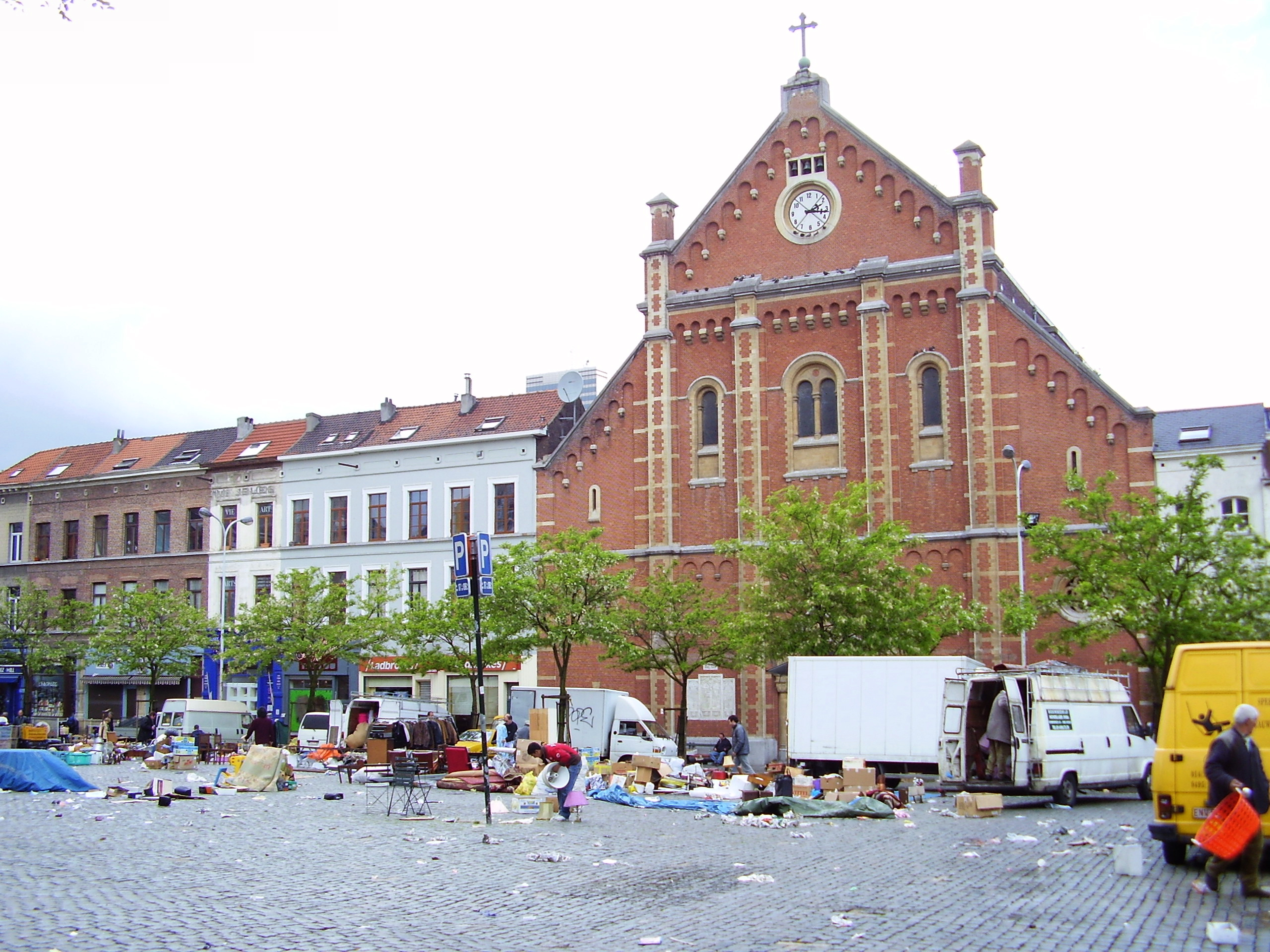
Place du Jeu de Balle/Vossenplein, end of a market

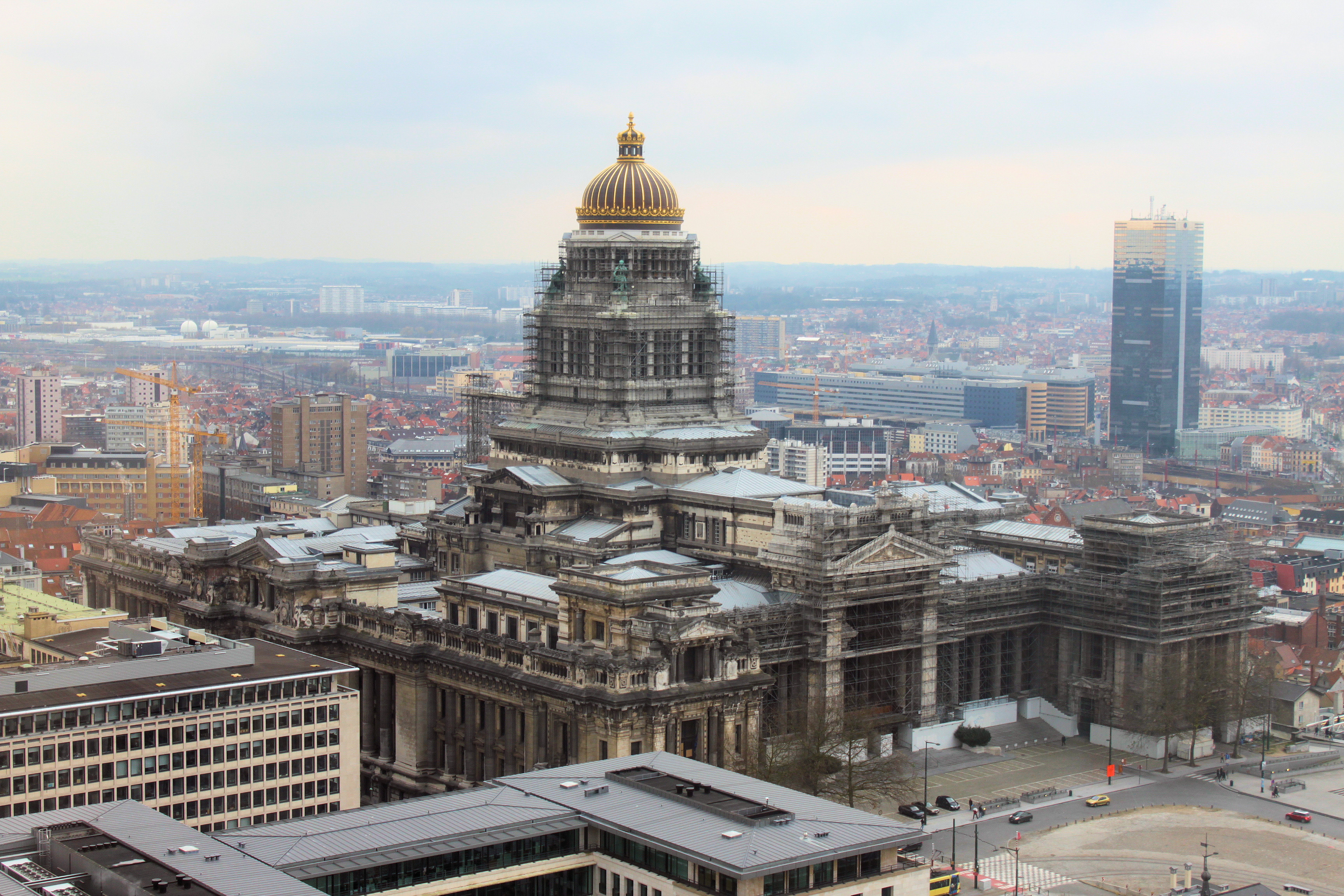
Palace of Justice

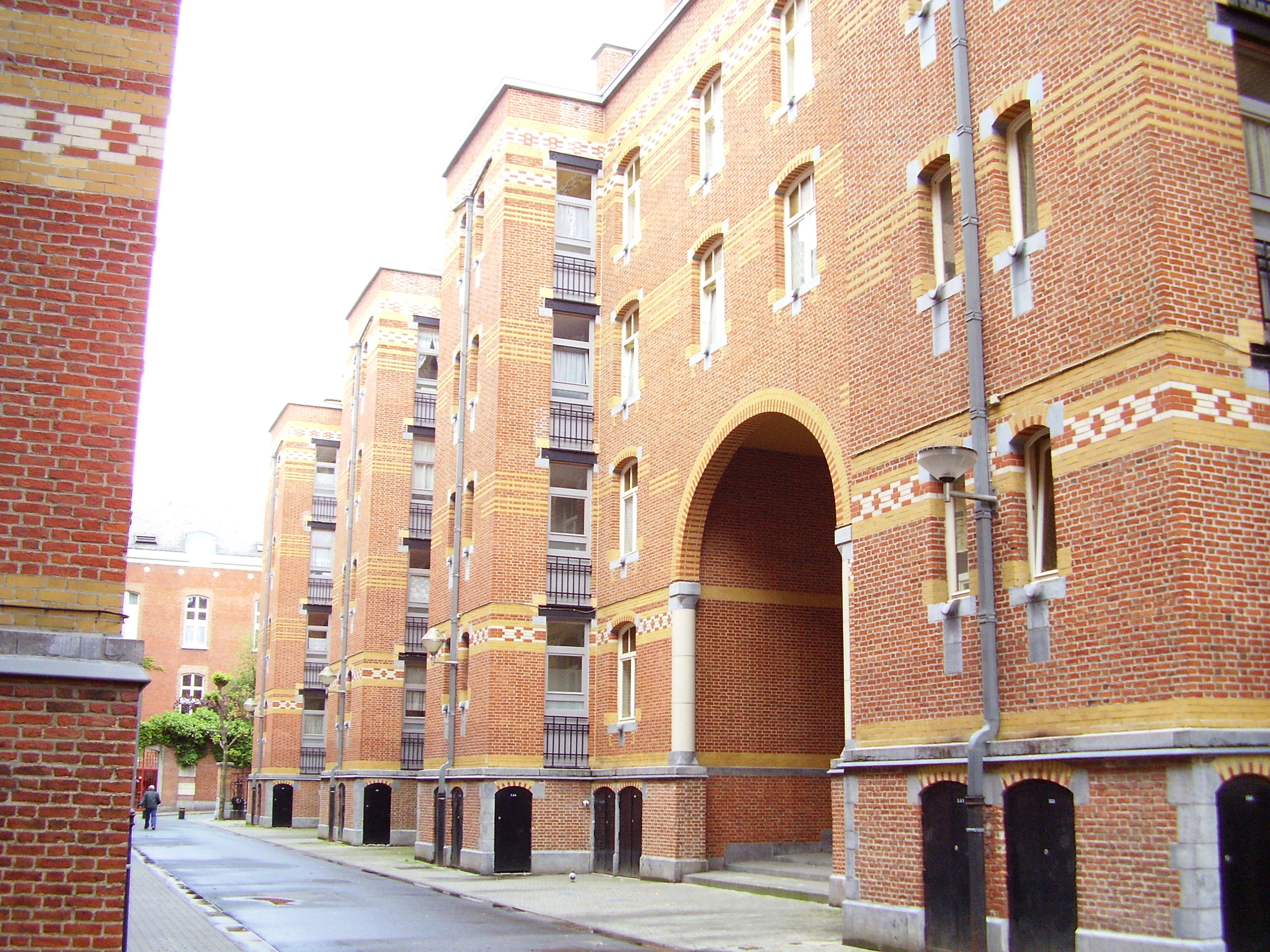
Cité Hellemans, Rue Blaes/Blaesstraat

== See also ==
- Neighbourhoods in Brussels
- History of Brussels
- Culture of Belgium
- Belgium in the long nineteenth century
