= Palace of Justice, Brussels =

Court building in Brussels, Belgium

Palace of Justice of Brussels
- Palais de Justice de Bruxelles (French); Justitiepaleis van Brussel (Dutch)
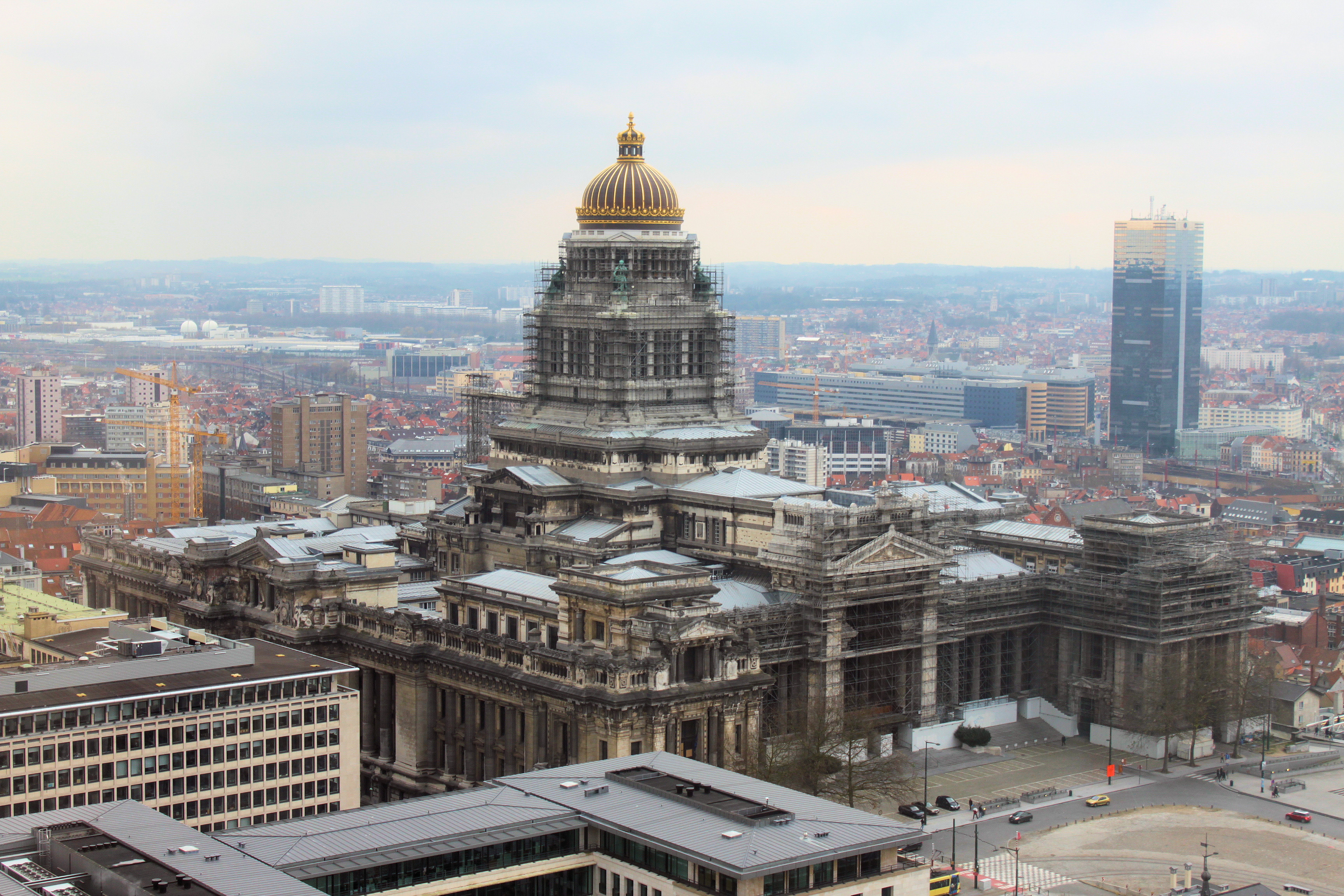
- View of the Palace of Justice from The Hotel Brussels (then Hilton) in 2009
- Alternative names: Law Courts of Brussels

General information
- Type: Courthouse
- Architectural style: Eclectic; Neoclassical
- Location: Place Poelaert / Poelaertplein 1, 1000 City of Brussels, Brussels-Capital Region, Belgium
- Coordinates: 50°50′12″N 4°21′06″E
- Current tenants: Belgian courts
- Construction started: 31 October 1866; 160 years ago
- Inaugurated: 15 October 1883; 143 years ago
- Renovated: 1947–48 (partial reconstruction); 1984–present
- Cost: 50 million Belgian francs (Note: This amount is roughly equivalent to an entire year of public works in the country at the time, or €392 million in 2025 when taking into account inflation.)
- Client: Belgian government
- Owner: Belgian government

Height
- Height: 116 m (381 ft)

Dimensions
- Diameter: 160 m × 150 m (520 ft × 490 ft)

Technical details
- Floor area: 26,000 m^{2} (280,000 sq ft)

Design and construction
- Architects: 1860–1879: Joseph Poelaert; 1879–1883: Joseph Joachim Benoît
- Other designers: François Wellens
- Designations: Protected (03/05/2001)

Other information
- Public transit: 2 6 Louise/Louiza

Website
- www.tribunaux-rechtbanken.be

The Palace of Justice of Brussels (Note: French: Palais de Justice de Bruxelles [palɛ d(ə) ʒystis də bʁysɛl]; Dutch: Justitiepaleis van Brussel [jʏsˈtisipaːˌlɛis fɑm ˈbrʏsəl].) or Law Courts of Brussels (Note: French: Cour de Justice de Bruxelles; Dutch: Rechtbank van Brussel.) is a courthouse in Brussels, Belgium. It is the country's most important court building, seat of the judicial arrondissement of Brussels, as well as of several courts and tribunals, including the Court of Cassation (Belgian supreme court), the Court of Assizes (highest criminal court), the Court of Appeal of Brussels (appellate court), the Tribunal of First Instance of Brussels (general jurisdiction), and the Bar Association of Brussels.

Designed by the architect Joseph Poelaert, in an eclectic style of Greco-Roman inspiration, to replace an older courthouse, the current building was erected between 1866 and 1883. With a ground surface of 26,006 m^{2} (279,930 sq ft), the edifice is reputed to be the largest constructed in the 19th century and remains one of the largest of its kind. The total cost of the construction, land, and furnishings approximated 50 million Belgian francs. The building suffered heavy damage during World War II, when the cupola was destroyed and later rebuilt higher than the original. The structure has been under renovation since 1984 and scaffolding from that era still hangs on the building, though it is set to come down by 2035.

The Palace of Justice is located on the Place Poelaert/Poelaertplein in the Marolles/Marollen district (southern part of Brussels' city centre). The square is also connected to the lower town by the Poelaert Elevators.

== History ==
=== First courthouse (1818–1892) ===
The current Palace of Justice is located on the Galgenberg hill (French: Mont aux potences; "Gallows Mount"), between Brussels' upper and lower town, where in the Middle Ages convicted criminals were hanged, hence its name. A first courthouse had been erected, at a different location, in the Sablon/Zavel district, on the Place du Palais/Paleisplein (today's Place de la Justice/Gerechtsplein), between the Rue de l'Empereur/Keizerstraat (today's Boulevard de l'Empereur/Keizerlaan) and the (now-disappeared) Rue d'Or/Guldenstraat.

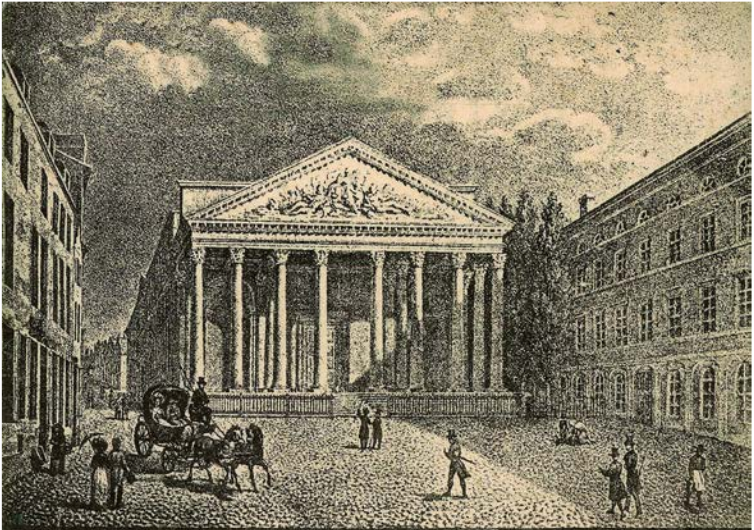
The former Palace of Justice (Verly, 1823) on the Place du Palais/Paleisplein

Built between 1818 and 1823 by the French architect François Verly on the site of a former Jesuit church, this first neoclassical structure had quickly deteriorated, and the question of building a new and larger courthouse arose as early as 1837. The condition was that the building could accommodate all civil and military jurisdictions under one roof. The choice of location, however, gave rise to heated controversies. It was indeed initially planned to rebuild it in the same place, but this project, the cost of which was estimated at 3 million Belgian francs, (Note: Equivalent to €25 million in 2025 when taking into account inflation.) quickly aborted. The idea of building it in the newly developed Leopold Quarter in the eastern part of town was no more successful. In 1846–47, another reconstruction project was also buried.

=== Inception of the project (1858–1866) ===
In 1858, the then-Minister of Justice, Victor Tesch, suggested for the first time the gardens of the House of Merode, where the extension of the Rue de la Régence/Regentschapsstraat would be constructed. The governor of the Province of Brabant suggested that it would be possible at the same time to link the new Louise/Louiza district to the city centre. Following a proposal from the advisor to the Court of Appeal, Gustave Bosquet, aiming at installing the building perpendicular to the Rue de la Régence rather than to the right of this extension, a study was entrusted to the Chief Engineer Groetaers. In his report, Groetaers recommended to erect a building of 26,000 m^{2} (280,000 sq ft), with a 100 m (330 ft) fronting facing a 100 m square. Disagreements having arisen between Groetaers and the city's mayor, the latter called for a competition for the building's design.

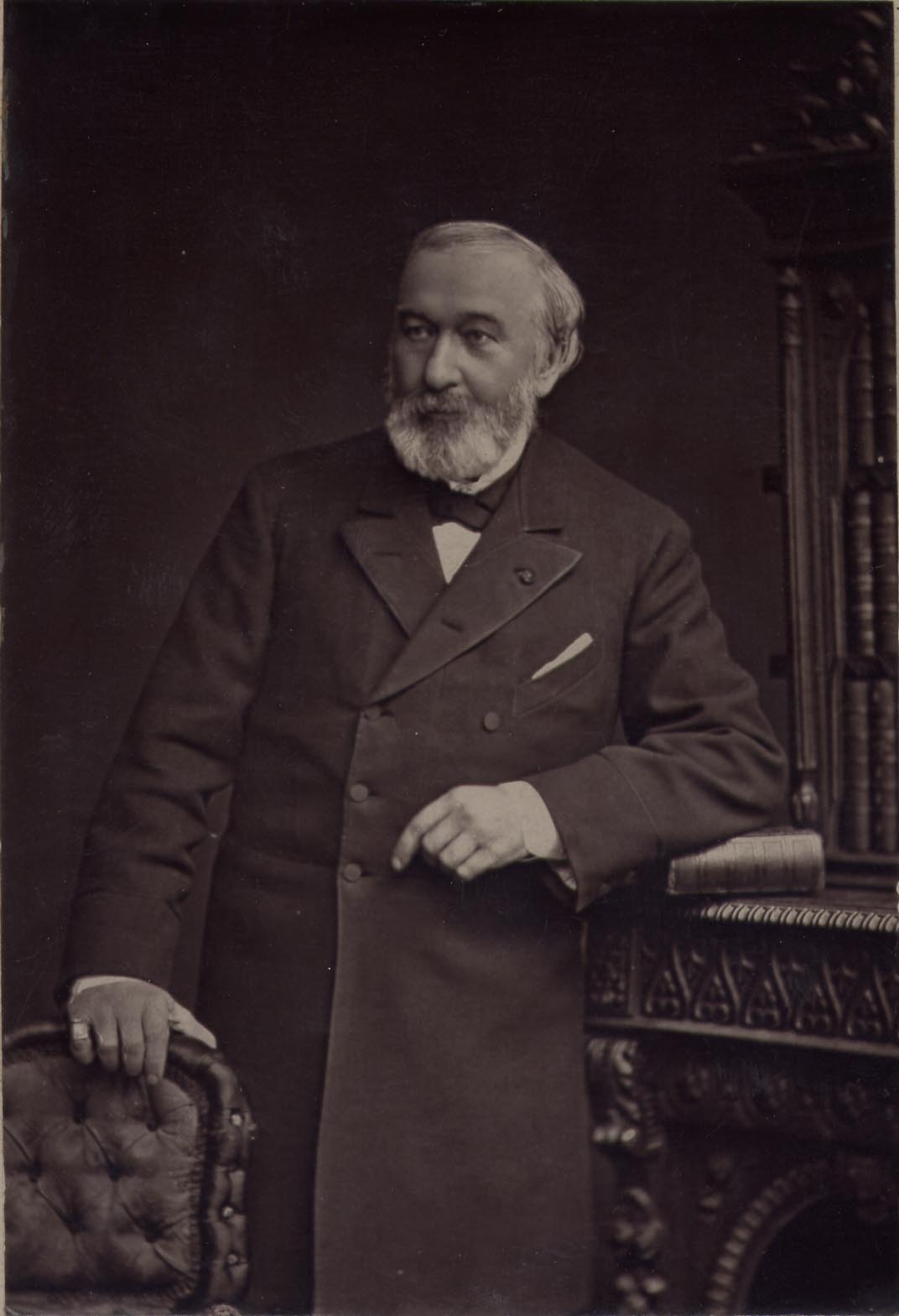
The Palace of Justice's architect, Joseph Poelaert

On 27 March 1860, an international architectural competition, endowed with three prizes, was therefore organised by royal decree. After several failed proposals, Tesch appointed the city's municipal architect, Joseph Poelaert, to draw plans of the building in 1861. The architect already enjoyed an excellent reputation, having to his credit a series of very prestigious projects in the capital, such as the commemorative Congress Column (1850), the Church of St. Catherine (1854) and the restoration of the Royal Theatre of La Monnaie (1855).

In April 1862, Poelaert submitted a preliminary draft, which was approved by Tesch. It was then in Paris, far from the pressures and influences of Brussels, that Poelaert withdrew to put the final touches to his plans. There, he gathered a team of designers including Charles Laisné and Édouard Corroyer. Given the prominent place that the Palace of Justice was called upon to occupy in the urban landscape, Poelaert opted for an eclectic style of Greco-Roman inspiration. Although he was inspired by classicism, he created a totally personal and original work.

=== Construction (1866–1883) ===
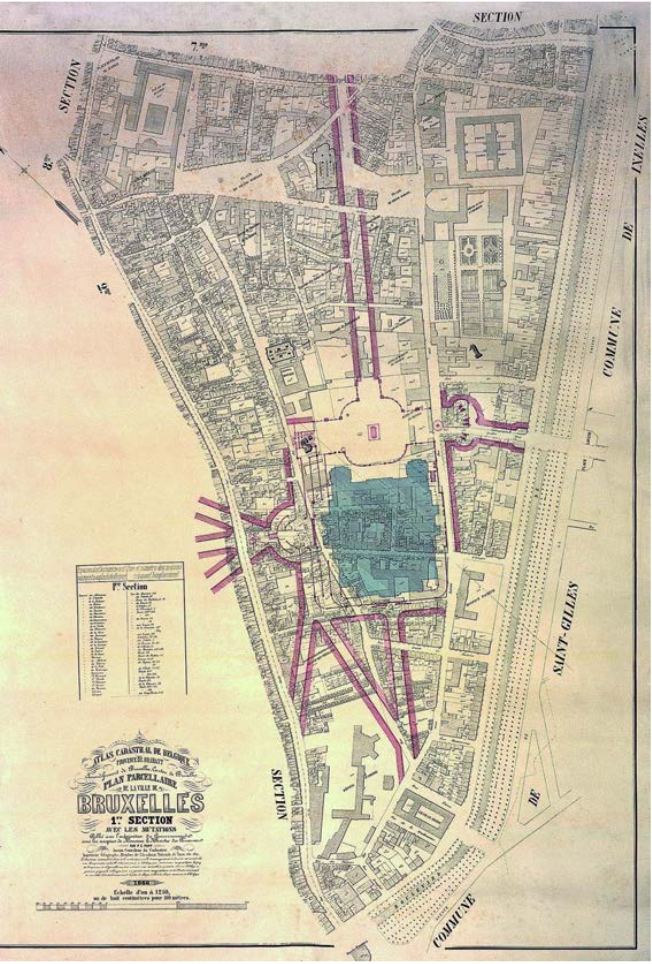
Development plan (1866)

The first stone was laid on 31 October 1866. At Poelaert's request, the management of the works was entrusted to the engineer François Wellens, Inspector General of the Ministry of Public Works and President of the Royal Commission of Monuments between 1865 and 1897. After Poelaert's death on 3 November 1879, the construction was taken over by the architect Joseph Joachim Benoît. The building was inaugurated on 15 October 1883 by King Leopold II in the presence of his wife Queen Marie-Henriette, his daughter Princess Clémentine, and members of the Belgian royal family. As for the old courthouse, it was demolished in 1892 to make way for the Rue Lebeau/Lebeaustraat, which leads into the Place de la Justice.

For the Palace of Justice's construction, a section of the Marolles/Marollen neighbourhood was demolished, while most of the garden belonging to the House of Merode was also expropriated. The 75 landlords belonging to the nobility and the high bourgeoisie, many of whom lived in their homes, received large indemnities, while the other more modest inhabitants, about a hundred, were also forced to move by the Belgian government, though they were compensated with houses in the Tillens-Roosendael garden city (French: cité-jardin Tillens-Roosendael) in the Quartier du Chat in the Uccle municipality.

Poelaert himself resided in the Marolles, only a few hundred metres from the building, on the Rue des Minimes/Minimenstraat, in a house adjoining his vast offices and workshops and communicating with them. It is thus unlikely he saw himself as ruining the neighbourhood. Nonetheless, many angry citizens personally blamed Poelaert for the forced relocations, and the expression schieven architect (meaning "shameful architect") became one of the most serious insults in the dialect of the Marolles. Although the construction took place during the reign of Leopold II, the king showed little interest in the building, and it is not considered part of his extensive architectural programme in Brussels nor his legacy as the "Builder-King".

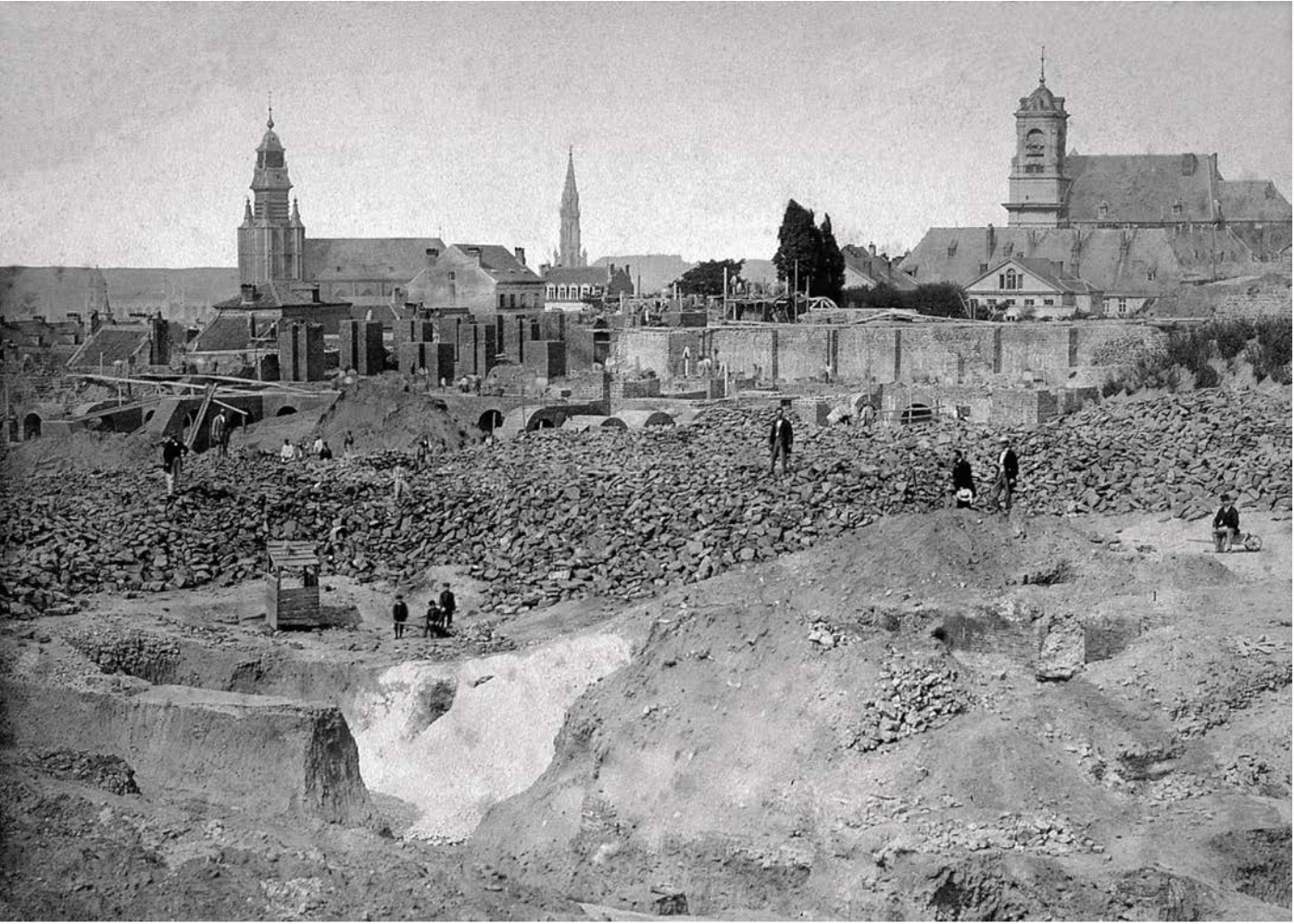
Groundwork (1867)

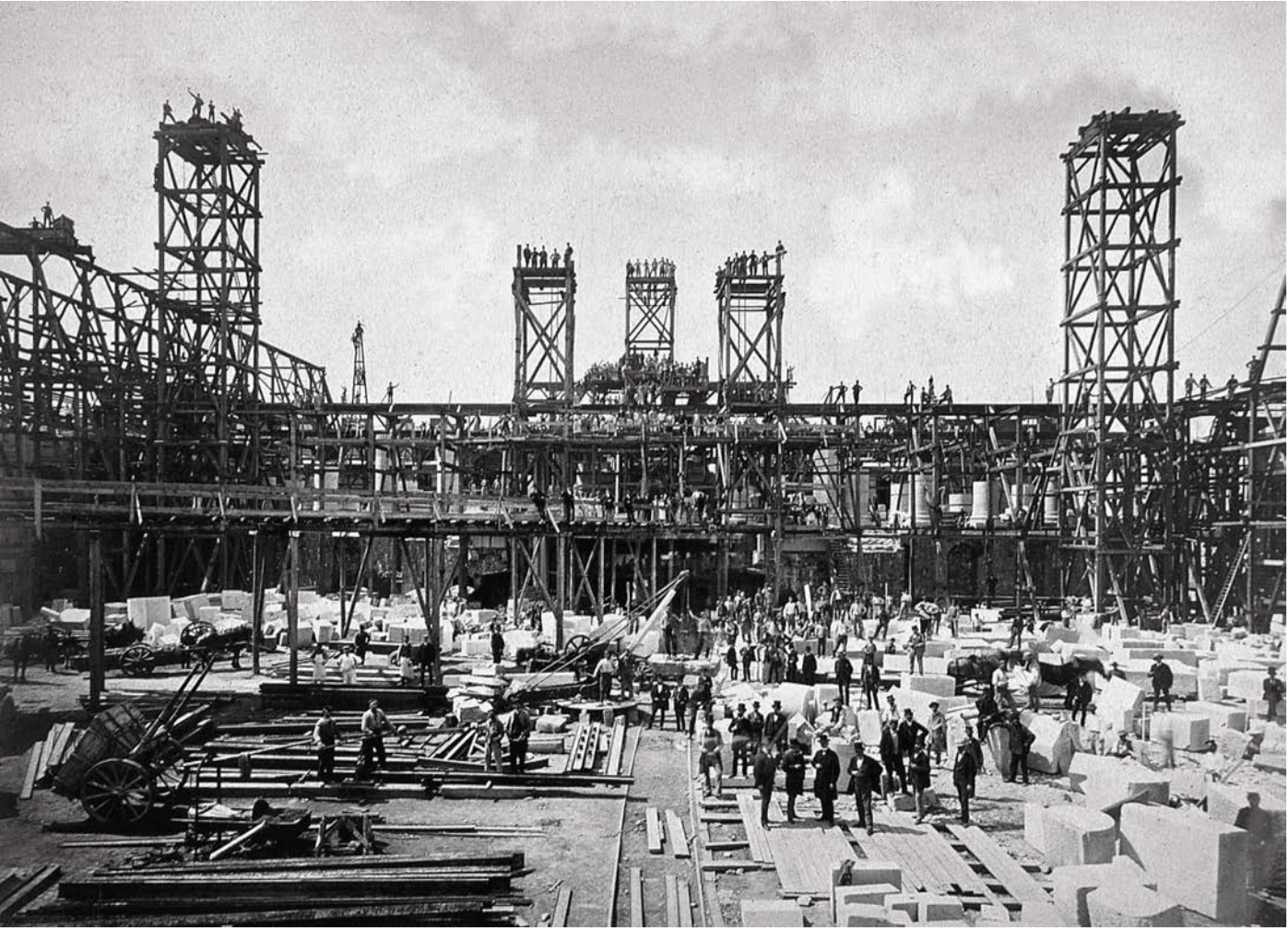
Assemblage of the scaffolding (1875)

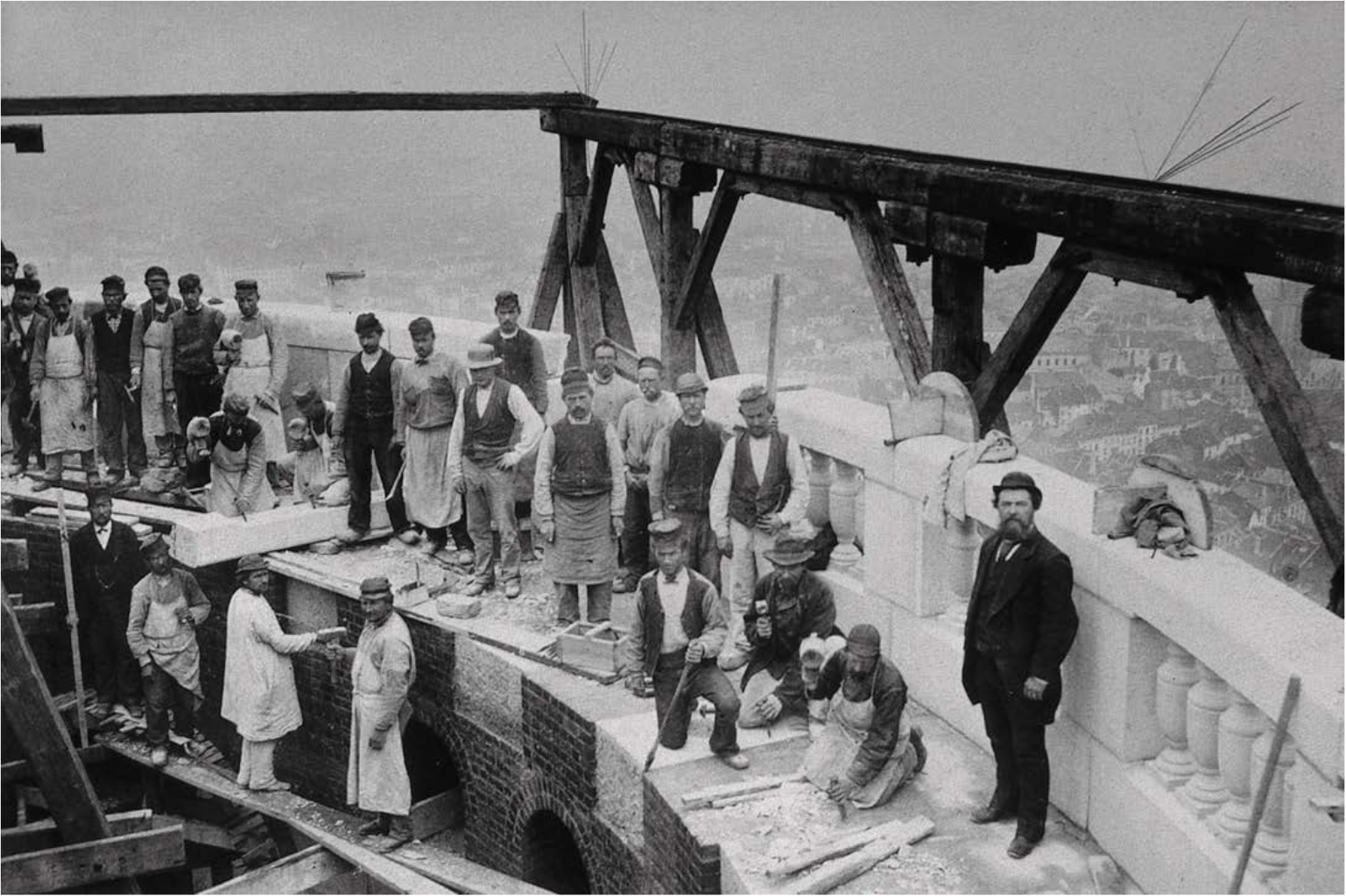
Last stone laying (1882)

=== Damage and renovation (1945–present) ===
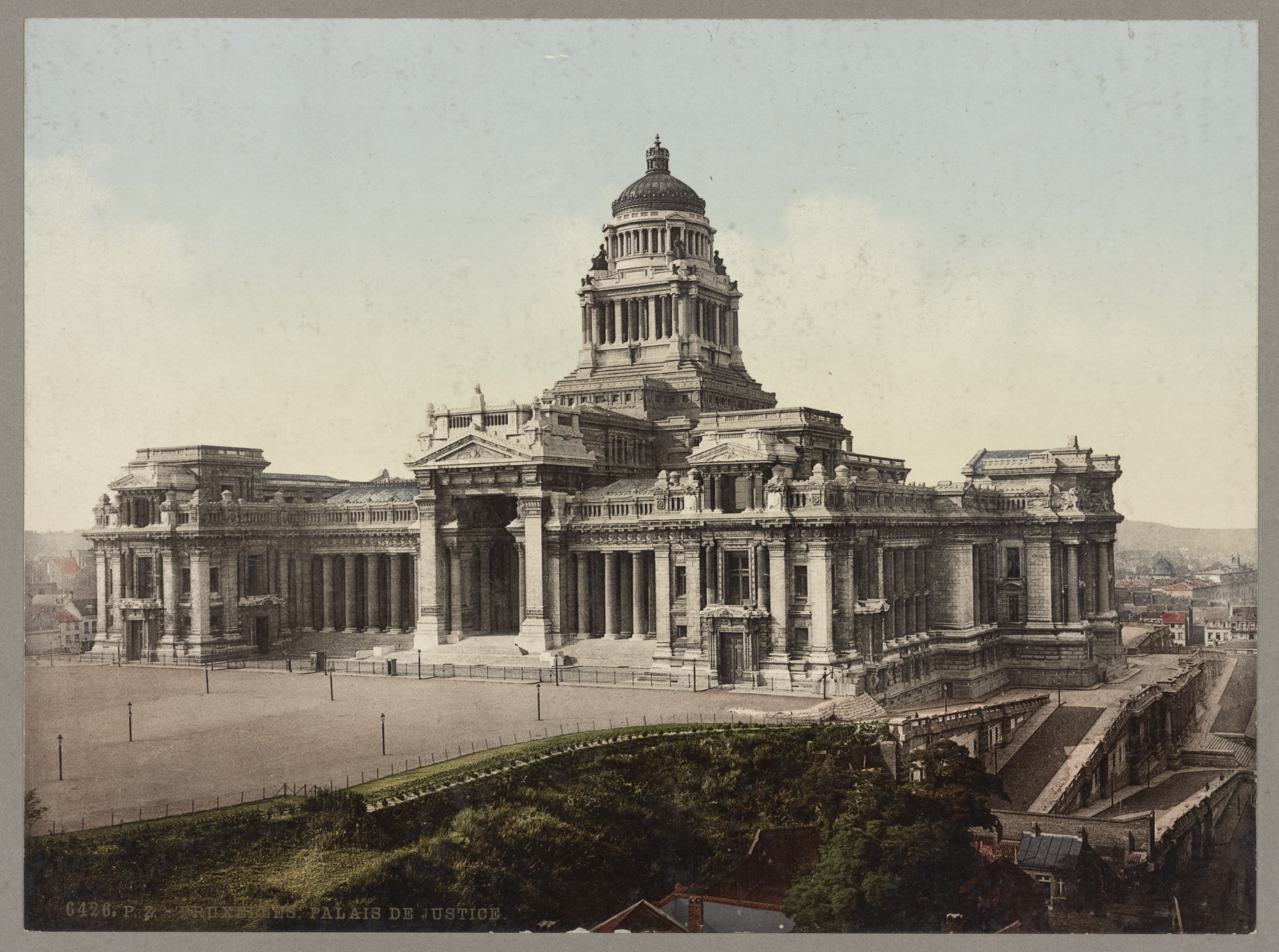
The Palace of Justice on a pre-1944 postcard. Note the lower dome.

On the eve of the liberation of Brussels at the end of the Second World War, the retreating German forces started a fire in the Palace of Justice in an attempt to destroy it and the legal records it contained. As a result, the cupola collapsed and part of the building was severely damaged. Two months later, the explosion of a V-1 rocket in the Rue des Minimes caused further damage. In 1947, the restoration work was entrusted to the architect-engineer and palace's custodian Albert Storrer. By 1948, most of the building had been repaired, and the cupola rebuilt 2.5 metres (8 ft 2 in) higher than the original, whose somewhat flat shape had previously been criticised.

Renovations to the building have been in progress since 1984. These renovations have focused on repairing and strengthening the roof structure and walls, as well as adding a new layer to the gilded cupola. In 2002–03, the roof was replaced and the structure repaired and reinforced. On 1 September 2003, the protective foil was removed from the dome, making it once again an eye-catcher on the Brussels skyline. Progress has been slow, however, and in 2013, it was reported that the decade-old scaffolding was so rusted and unsafe that it was in need of renovation itself.

Since the end of the 20th century, many jurisdictions have vacated the Palace of Justice on the grounds that it no longer meets the criteria required for the exercise of justice, particularly in terms of the necessary workspace. The government of the Brussels-Capital Region issued two designation orders, on 3 May 2001 and on 28 February 2008, "Because of its historical, artistic and technical interest". In 2008, a proposal was made for the building to be recognised as a World Heritage Site by UNESCO. In 2016, the World Monuments Fund placed the courthouse on its list of endangered monuments. Following the collapse of part of the ceiling in 2018, Jean de Codt, the first president of the Court of Cassation and the country's highest magistrate, publicly demanded additional financial resources to ensure the building's sustainability and the safety of its occupants.

Although several plans have followed to address the dilapidated state of the rooms and security issues, the work is expected to continue for many more years, leaving the building's future uncertain. In 2022, further renovation plans were announced, with completion expected for "2024 or 2025". In November 2024, the federal government announced that the first scaffolding would be removed by the end of the year, with the rest to be dismantled by 2030. This deadline was later pushed back to 2035. By the end of August 2026, the first phase of the project had been completed and the scaffolding on the main façade, its peristyle, the staircase, and the main courtyard, was removed.

== Description ==
=== Dimensions and cost ===
The Palace of Justice is reputed to be the largest building constructed during the 19th century, and remains one of the largest courthouses today. (Note: It was not until 1965 that it was surpassed as the world's largest building by NASA's Vehicle Assembly Building (VAB) at Cape Canaveral.) The edifice measures 160 by 150 metres (520 by 490 ft), and covers a total built ground surface of approximately 26,000 m^{2} (280,000 sq ft), bigger than St. Peter's Basilica in Rome. The 105-metre-high (344 ft) dome weighs 24,000 tonnes (53,000,000 lb). The building contains eight courtyards with a surface of 6,000 m^{2} (65,000 sq ft), 27 large court rooms, as well as 245 smaller court rooms and other rooms. Situated on a hill with a steep incline, there is a level difference of 20 metres (66 ft) between the upper and lower town, resulting in multiple entrances to the building at different levels. Moreover, the impressive main hall or salle des pas perdus (lit. 'hall of lost steps') is around 3,600 m^{2} (39,000 sq ft) including the first-floor gallery: 90 metres (300 ft) long and 40 metres (130 ft) wide. A compass rose with sixteen rays marks the centre of the room.

The construction of the Palace of Justice involved substantial expenditure. The building's total cost is frequently estimated at approximately 50 million Belgian francs for an initial estimate of barely 3 million. This frequently repeated account was already challenged at the time by the engineer François Wellens, who questioned the accuracy of the figures. Contemporary parliamentary discussions also document successive revisions to the projected construction cost. The excessiveness of the undertaking, however, and the freedom given to the architect to override almost all the initially imposed rules, remain a mystery.

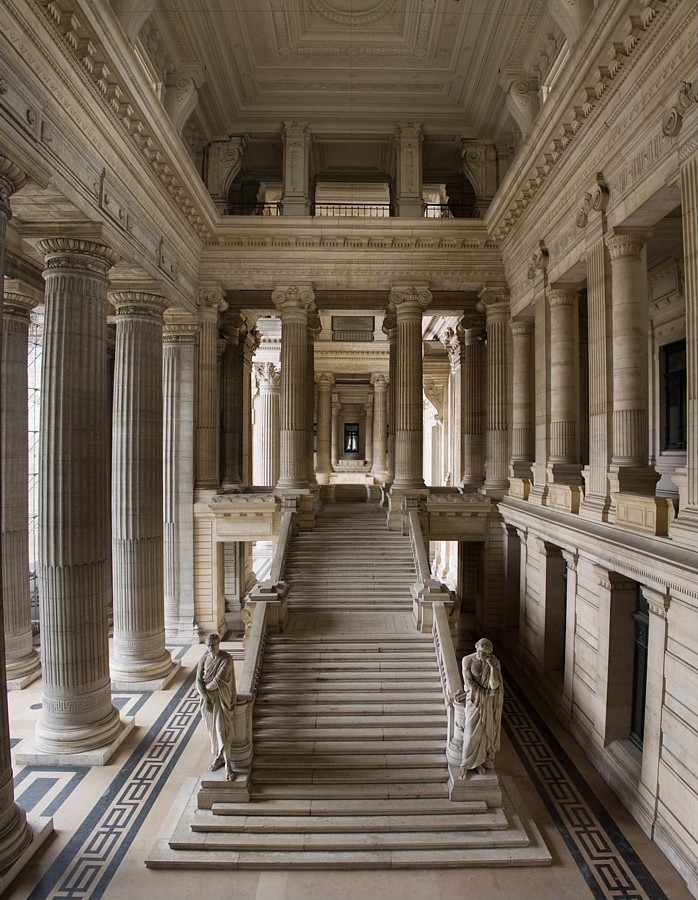
The monumental marble staircase

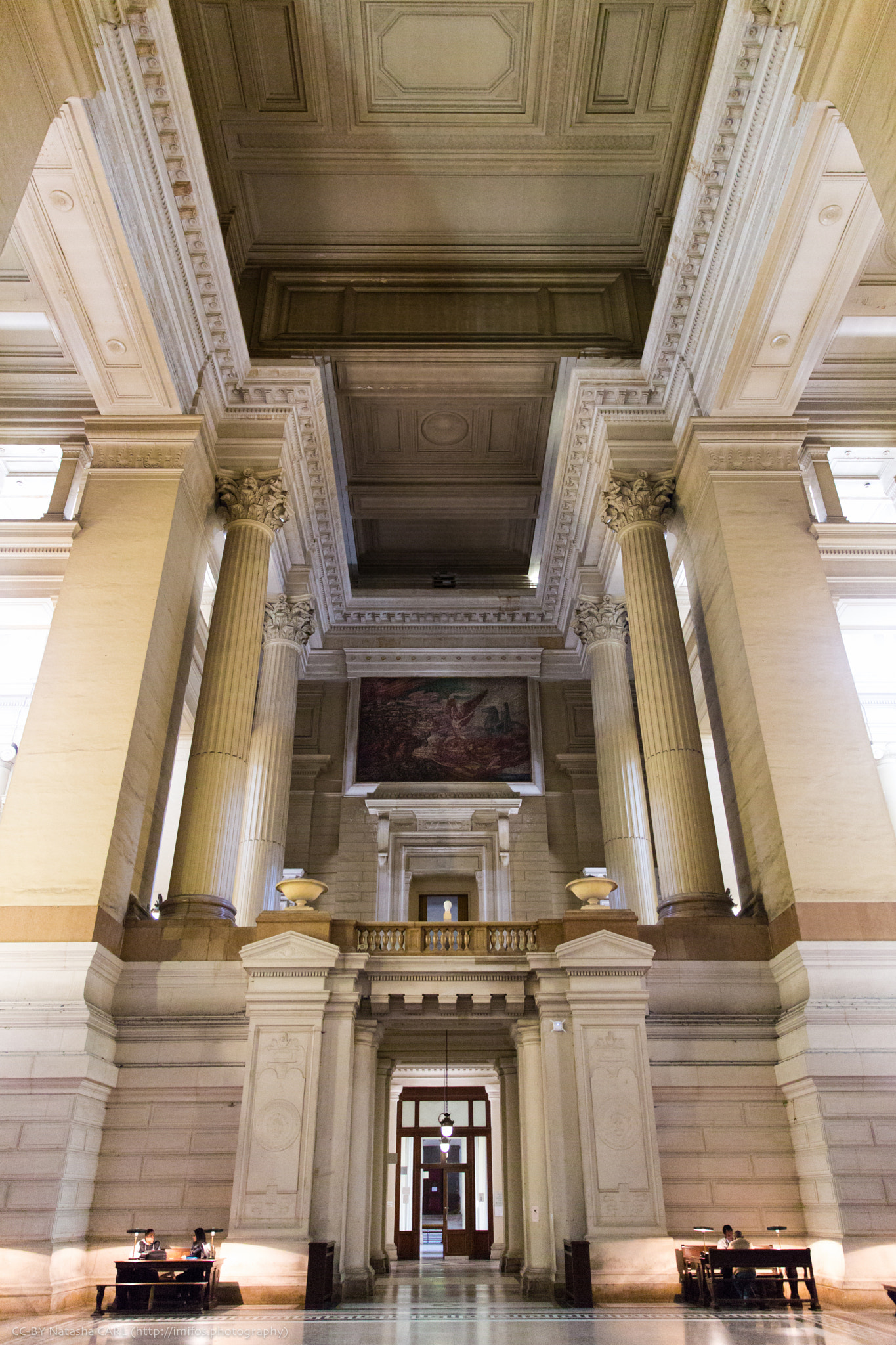
The main entry hall or salle des pas perdus

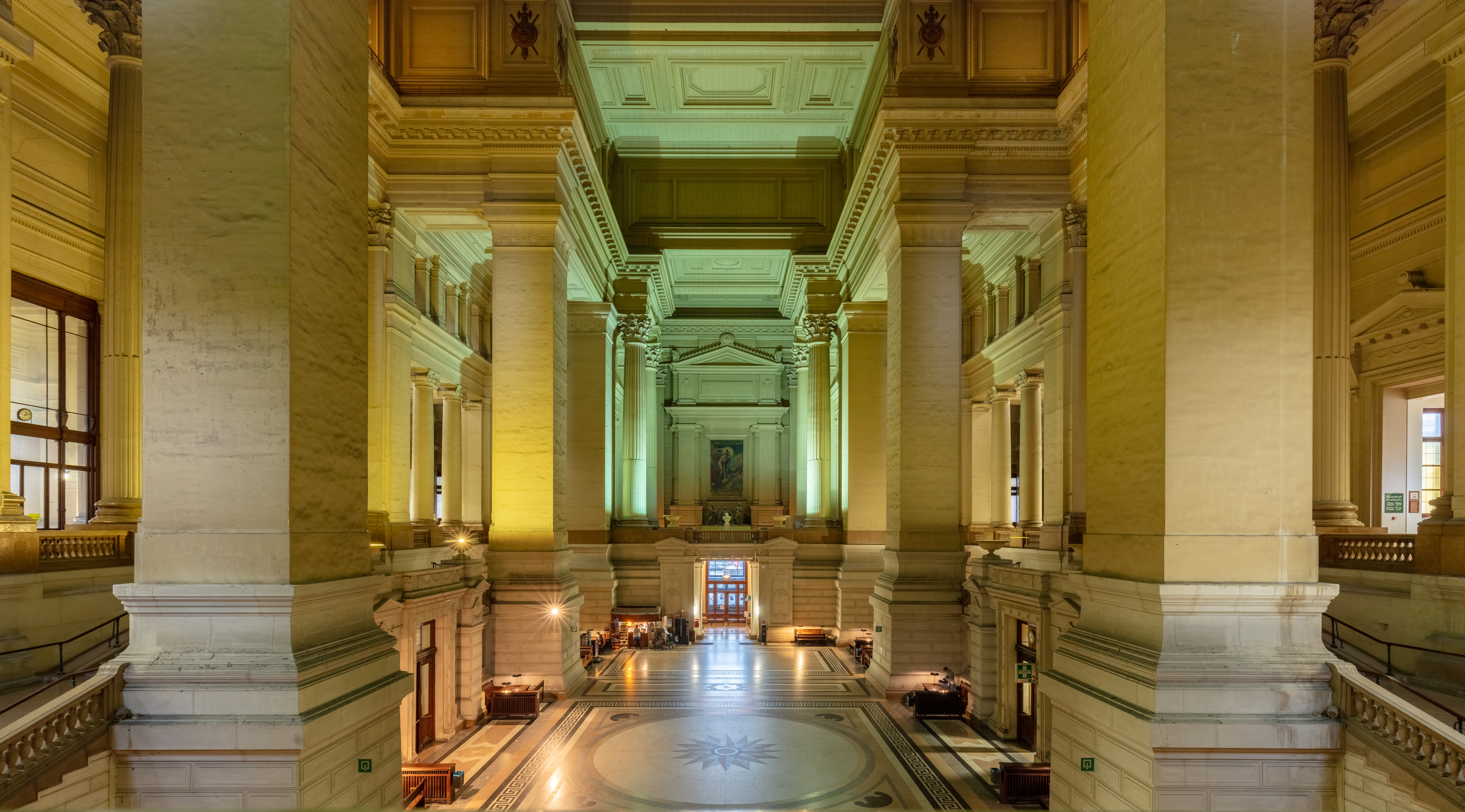
Interior view of the salle des pas perdus

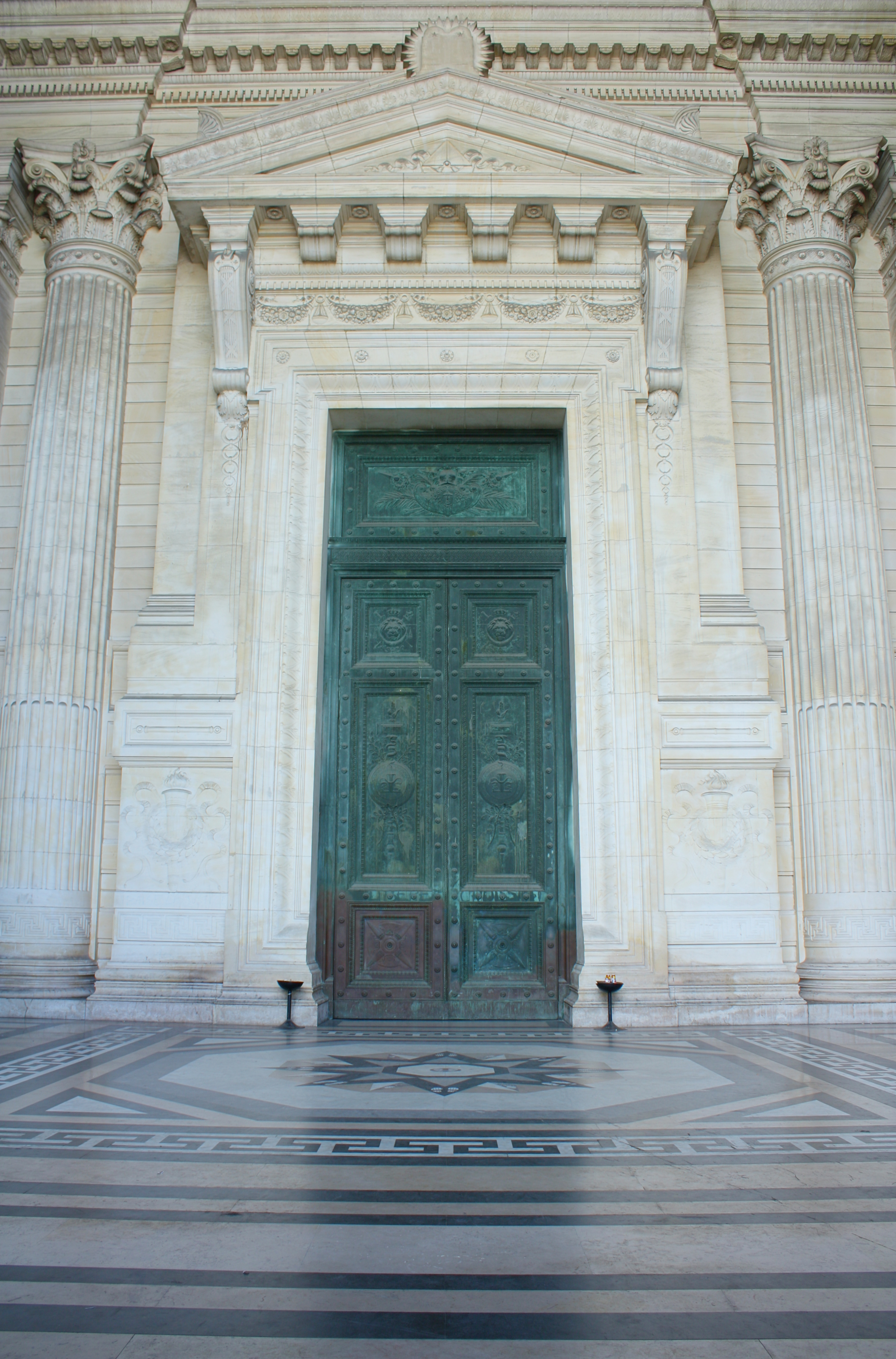
One of the massive neoclassical doors

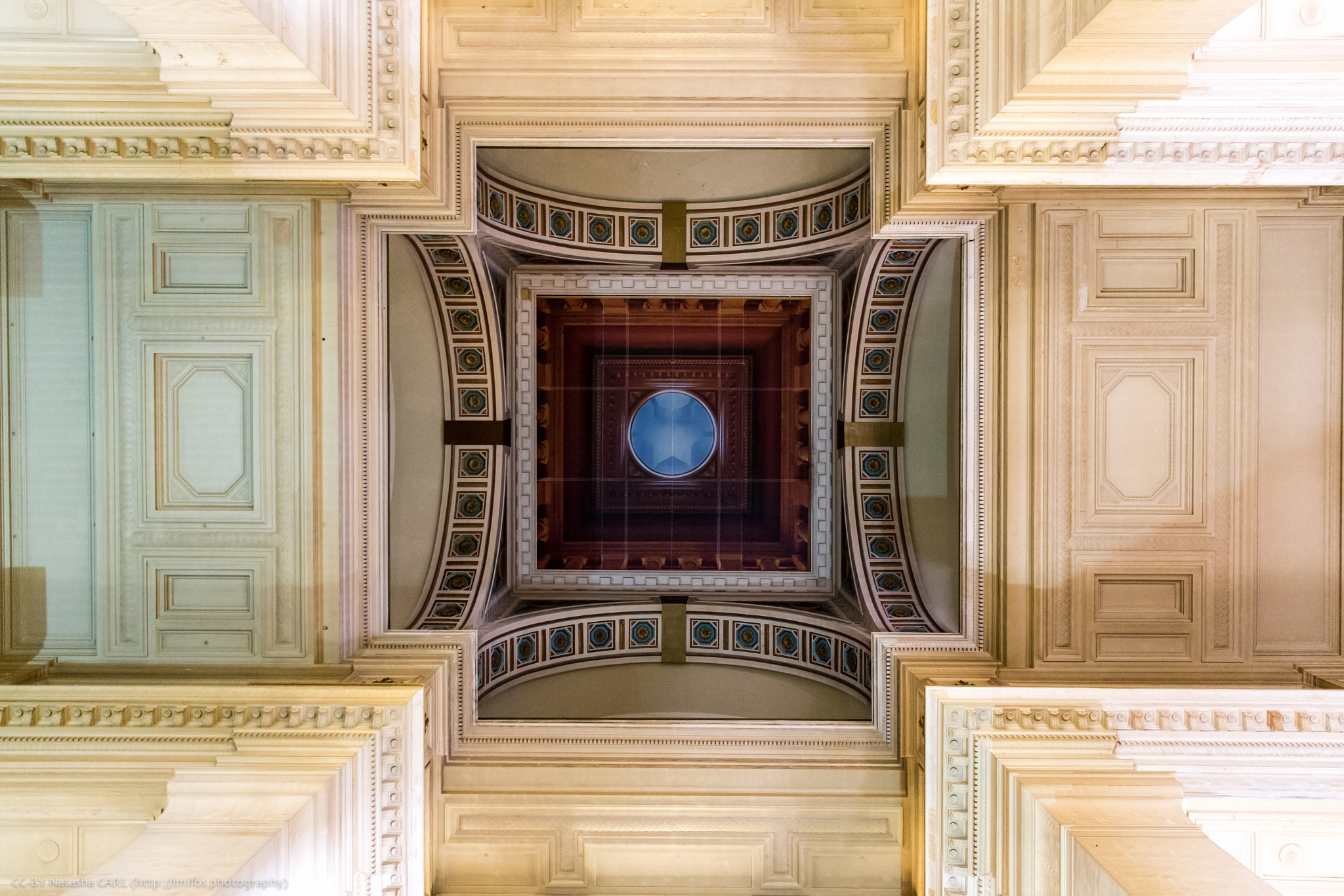
At the centre of the building looking upwards towards the dome

=== Architecture and symbolism ===
Monumental and austere in its architecture, the Palace of Justice was intended as a symbolic expression of judicial power. The building is undoubtedly eclectic, Greco-Roman inspired with borrowings from Assyro-Babylonian and Egyptian architecture. It departs from classical norms through the layering of forms and volumes, as well as the interplay between interior and exterior spaces. It is also partially supported by an internal steel structure, a technical innovation at the time.

The main entrance on the Place Poelaert/Poelaertplein is accessed through the monumental peristyle. At the foot of two grand staircases stand larger-than-life statues of the Greek orator Demosthenes and lawgiver Lycurgus by the sculptor Pierre Armand Cattier, as well as figures of the Roman jurists Cicero and Ulpian by Antoine-Félix Bouré. The central portico, 39 metres (128 ft) high, is surmounted by a helmeted bust of Themis, the ancient Greek Titaness and personification of divine law and order, by Joseph Ducaju. The bronze doors were designed by the architect Jacques Van Mansfeld and crafted in 1896 by Georges Houtstont; the originals were destroyed during the First World War and replaced by replicas in 1932. There is also a bust of Poelaert (1887) by Jean Cuypers.

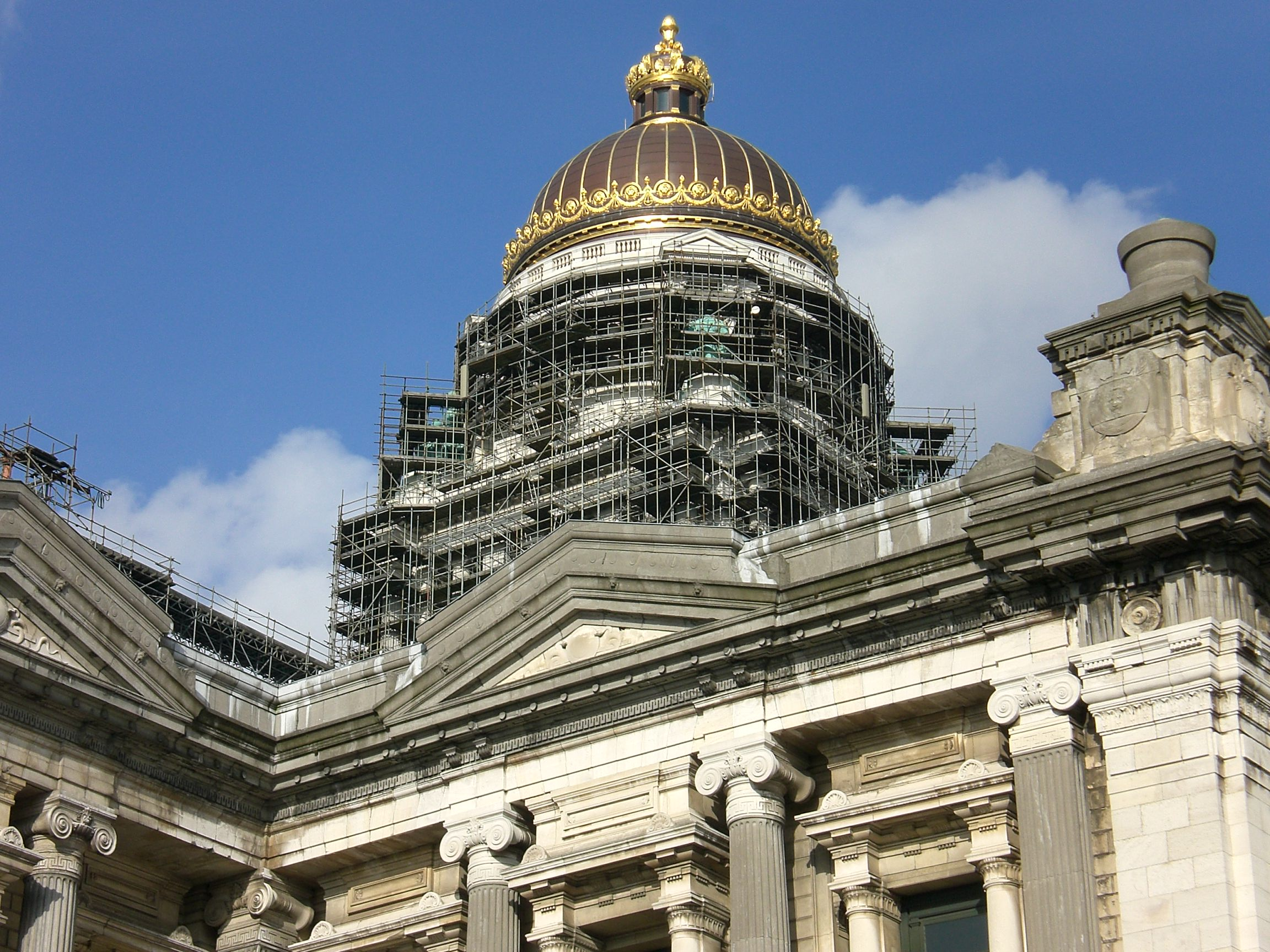
The dome with its scaffolding

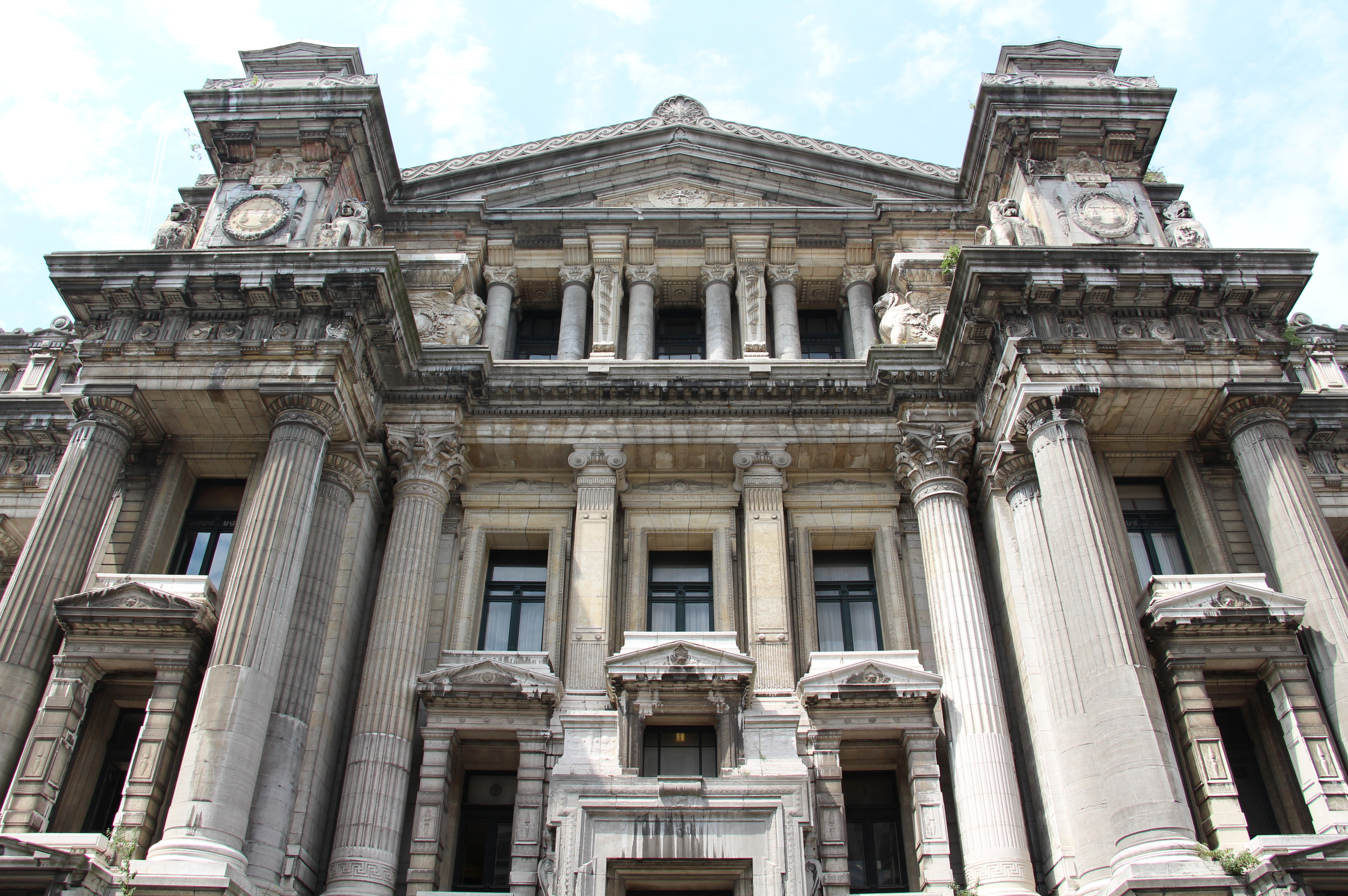
Western façade

== Usage ==
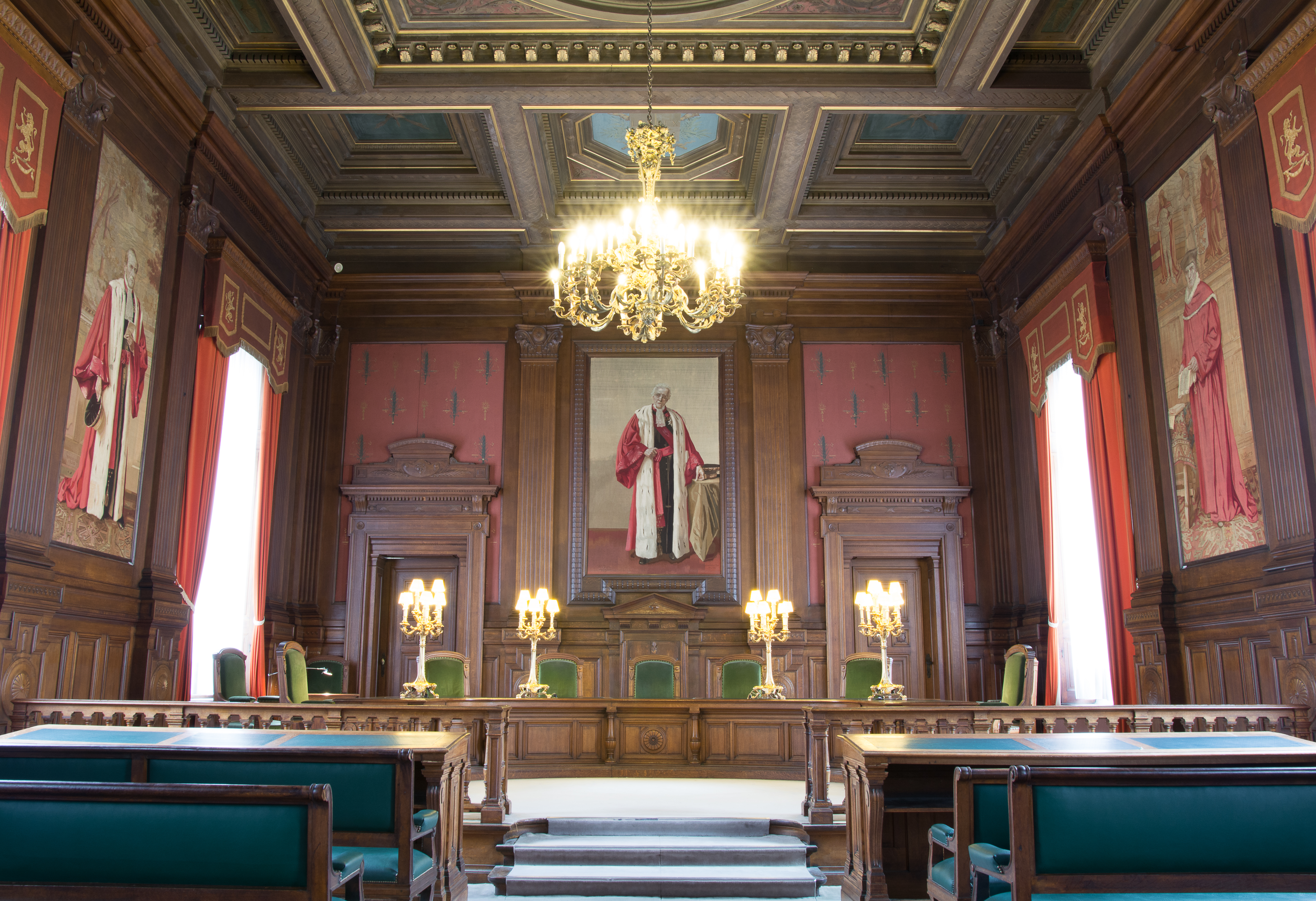
Standard courtroom of the Court of Cassation (Belgian supreme court) inside the Palace of Justice

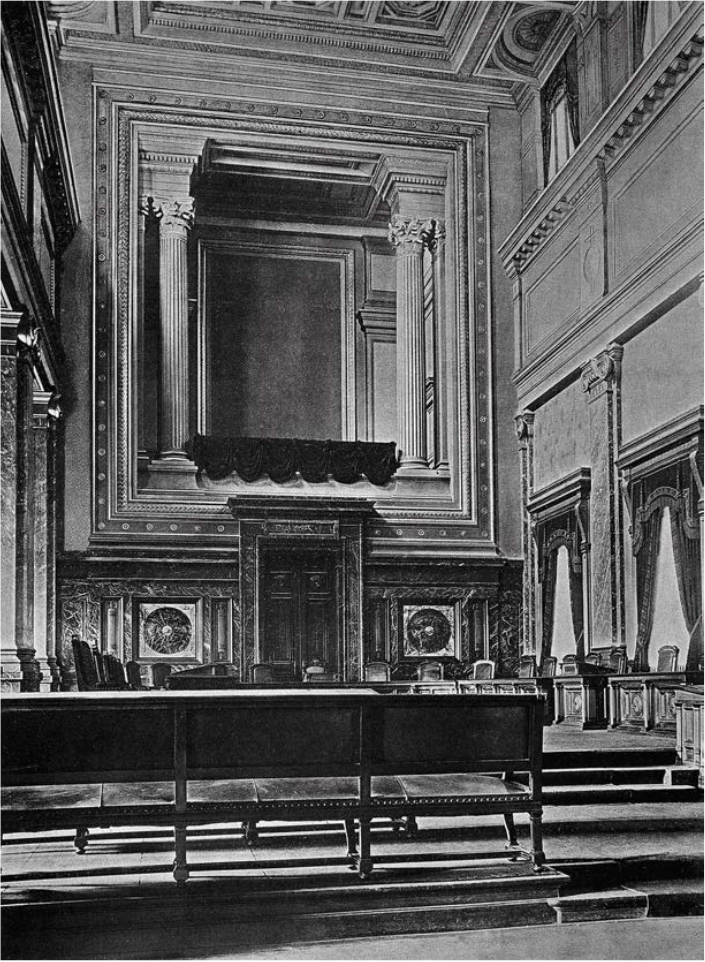
The Court's grand courtroom, used for larger sessions and judicial ceremonies

The Palace of Justice is the most important court building in Belgium, seat of the country's different courts and tribunals, most notably the Court of Cassation, its supreme court. The Court of Cassation handles cases in the two main languages of Belgium, being Dutch and French, and provides certain facilities for cases in German. The Court of Assizes (criminal court that tries the most serious crimes), the Court of Appeal of Brussels (appellate court), as well as the Tribunal of First Instance of Brussels (general jurisdiction), also seat there. The Palace of Justice also includes within it the prosecution services adjoining these jurisdictions, as well as various libraries.

=== Courts and tribunals ===
- Court of Cassation: 1st president, Griffie-Clerck and Prosecution
- Court of Assizes
- Court of Appeal of Brussels: 1st president, Griffie-Clerck and Prosecution
- Tribunal of First Instance of Brussels

=== Libraries ===
- Library of the Magistrate
- Library of the Bar Association of Brussels
- Library of the Lawyers

=== Arrondissement of Brussels ===
Moreover, the Palace of Justice is the seat of the judicial arrondissement of Brussels (covering the entire Brussels-Capital Region), having split from the Flemish part of the former bilingual arrondissement of Brussels-Halle-Vilvoorde (BHV) in mid-2012 (which made Halle-Vilvoorde a monolingual Flemish electoral and judicial district).

=== Bar Association of Brussels ===
Finally, the Palace of Justice is also home to the Bar Association of Brussels (French: Barreau de Bruxelles, Dutch: Balie te Brussel), a professional order of 7,000 Brussels lawyers, founded on 14 December 1810. Since 1984, the Bar Association of Brussels has been split into two, the French-speaking order (Ordre français des Avocats du Barreau de Bruxelles) and the Dutch-speaking order (Nederlandse Orde van Advocaten te Brussel).

== Surroundings ==
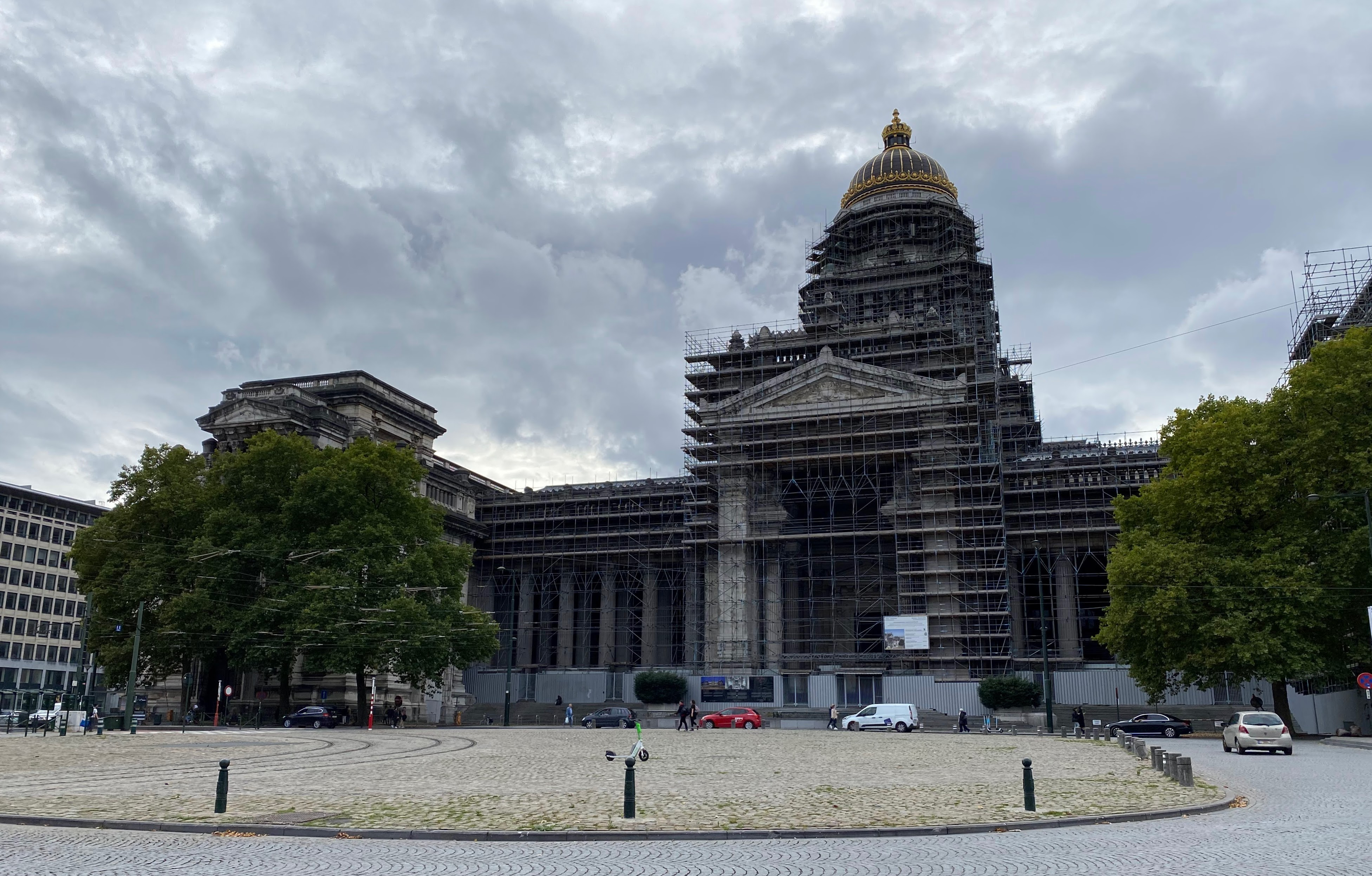
The Place Poelaert/Poelaertplein in front of the Palace of Justice

The Place Poelaert/Poelaertplein, in front of the Palace of Justice, is the largest square in Brussels, measuring 155 by 50 metres (509 by 164 ft). The initial development project, which provided for a large square in a semicircle (1862), could not be implemented due to Poelaert's sudden death. Consequently, this square does not have an architectural unity in the buildings that surrounds it, nor the belvedere coming from the original plan, and instead constitutes a vast transit space unsuitable for pedestrians, not functioning as an urban square but as a roundabout for cars preventing the appropriation of the place by walkers. In 1905, it was the scene of prestigious commemorations for the 75th anniversary of Belgian independence. Nowadays, it is a popular viewpoint in Brussels. From the elevated vantage point, the tower of Brussels' Town Hall on the Grand-Place/Grote Markt (main square) is visible. On a sunny day, the Basilica of the Sacred Heart in Koekelberg and the Atomium on the Heysel/Heizel Plateau in northern Brussels can be seen.

Next to the Palace of Justice, on the Place Poelaert, stand two war memorials: the Belgian Infantry Memorial by Edouard Vereycken (1935) and the Anglo-Belgian Memorial by Charles Sargeant Jagger (1923). In addition, the Poelaert Elevators, in popular language the Elevators of the Marolles, are a set of two public lifts that connects the upper and lower town between the Place Poelaert and the Square Breughel l'Ancien/Breughel de Oudeplein. They were executed by the AVA Architects office, under the coordination of the architect Patrice Neirinck, and were inaugurated in June 2002.

== Influence ==
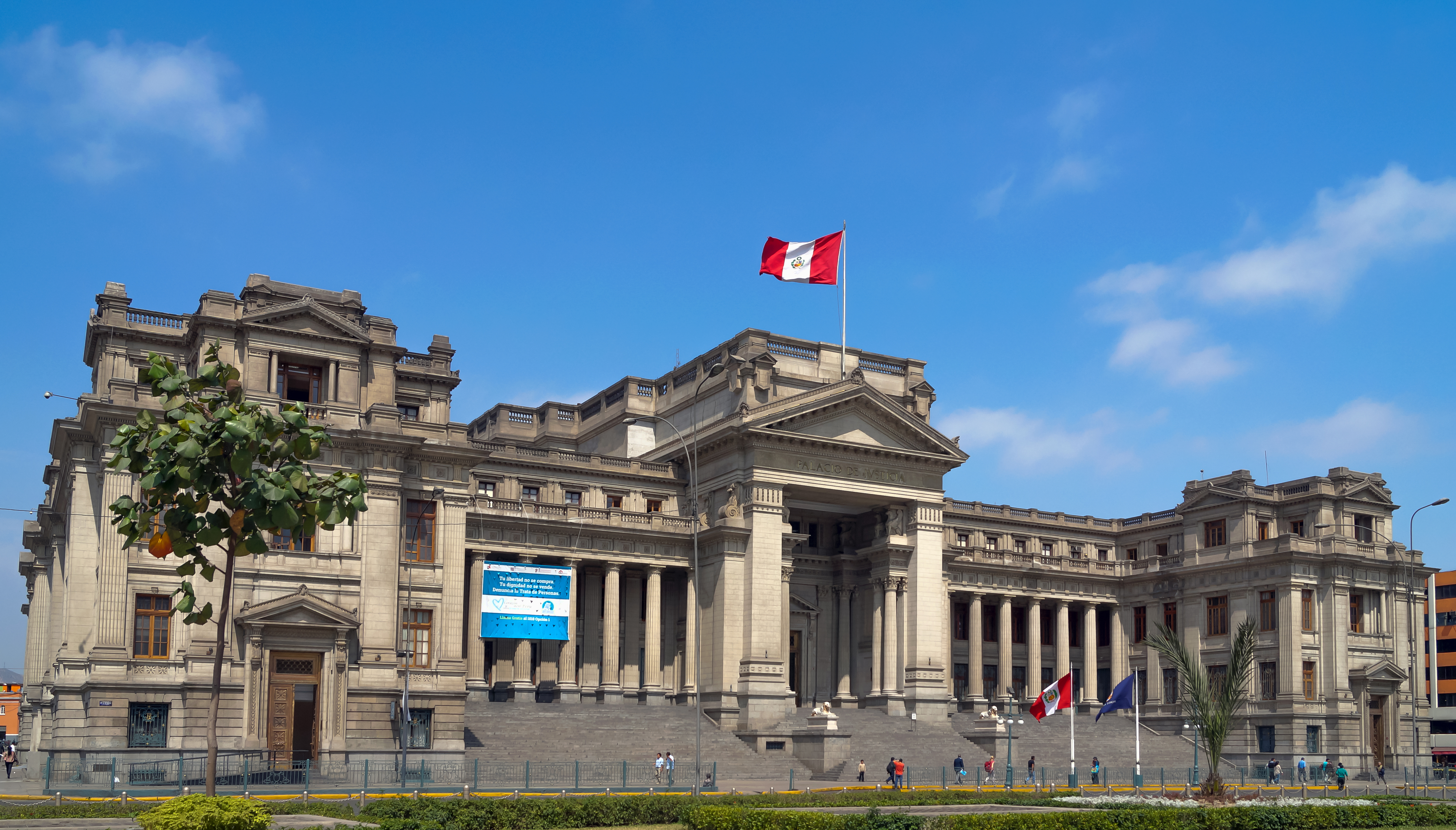
The Palace of Justice of Lima, Peru, is inspired by that of Brussels.

The architecture of the Palace of Justice served as a model for the Reich Court building in Leipzig, Germany, which was inaugurated in 1895. There is also a well-known story that Adolf Hitler was reportedly fond of the Brussels building. Albert Speer, the Minister of Armaments and War Production in Nazi Germany, stated in his book Inside the Third Reich that he had been dispatched to Brussels in 1940 to study the building.

Although much smaller and lacking a dome, the Palace of Justice in Lima, Peru, which houses the Supreme Court of Peru, is also based upon Brussels' Palace of Justice.

== See also ==
- List of tallest structures built before the 20th century
- Neoclassical architecture in Belgium
- History of Brussels
- Belgium in the long nineteenth century
