= Place Poelaert =

Square in Brussels, Belgium

Place Poelaert (French); Poelaertplein (Dutch)
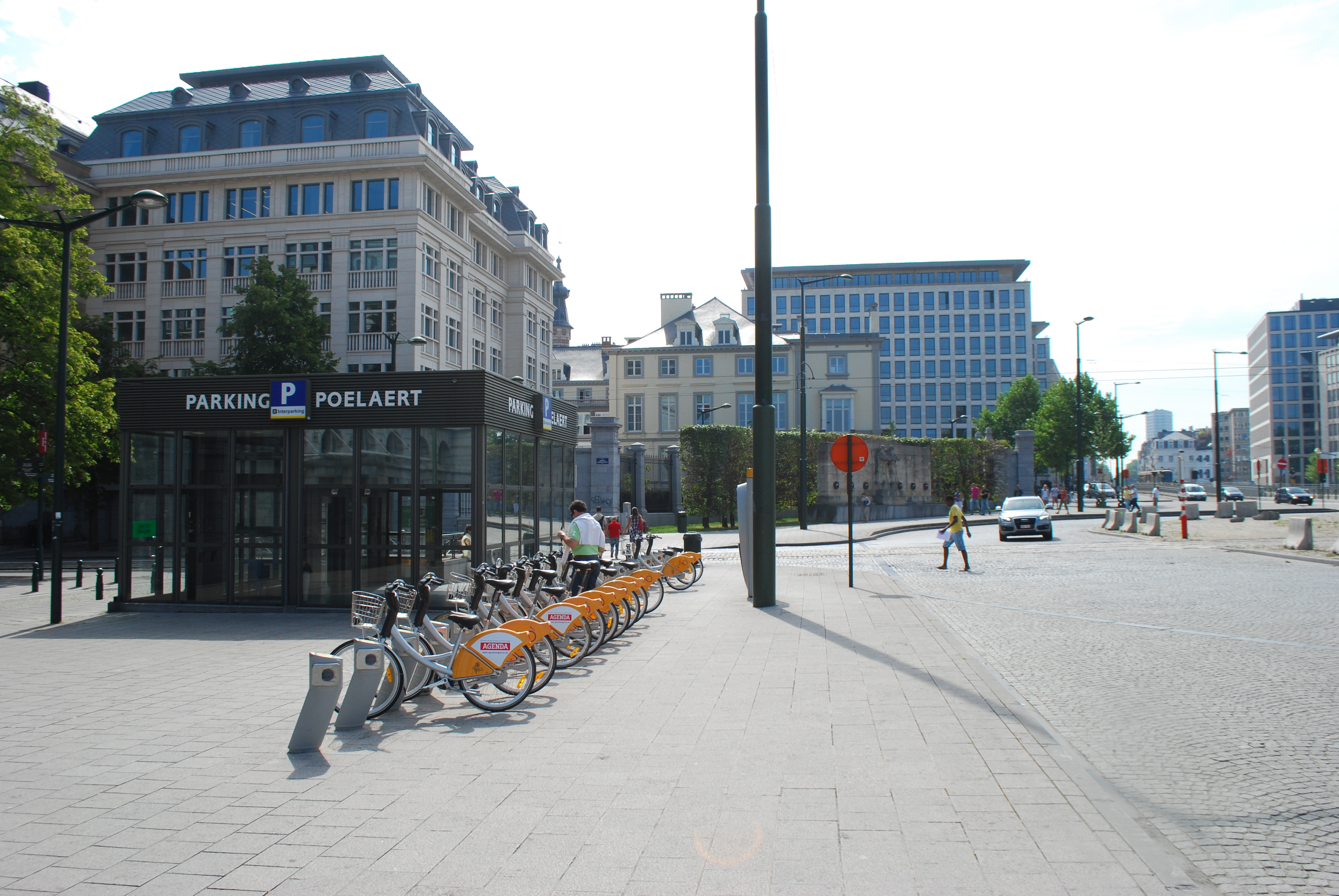
- The Place Poelaert/Poelaertplein in Brussels

- Location within Brussels Location within Belgium
- Namesake: Joseph Poelaert
- Type: Square
- Location: City of Brussels, Brussels-Capital Region, Belgium
- Quarter: Marolles/Marollen
- Postal code: 1000
- Nearest metro station: 2 6 Louise/Louiza
- Coordinates: 50°50′16″N 04°21′10″E

The Place Poelaert (French, pronounced [plas pu.laʁt]) or Poelaertplein (Dutch, pronounced [ˈpulaːrtˌplɛin]) is the largest square in Brussels, Belgium, measuring 155 by 50 metres (509 by 164 ft). It is named in honour of Joseph Poelaert, the architect of the Palace of Justice.

The square is located close to the Place Louise/Louizaplein and the Small Ring (Brussels' inner ring road). It is also connected to the lower town by the Poelaert Elevators.

== History and layout ==
The Place Poelaert is the result of major filling and clearing works begun in 1867 for the Palace of Justice's construction. The initial development project, which provided for a large square in a semicircle (1862), could not be implemented due to Joseph Poelaert's sudden death. Consequently, this square does not have an architectural unity in the buildings that surrounds it, nor the belvedere coming from the original plan, and instead constitutes a vast transit space unsuitable for pedestrians, not functioning as an urban square but as a roundabout for cars preventing the appropriation of the place by walkers. In 1905, it was the scene of prestigious commemorations for the 75th anniversary of Belgian independence.

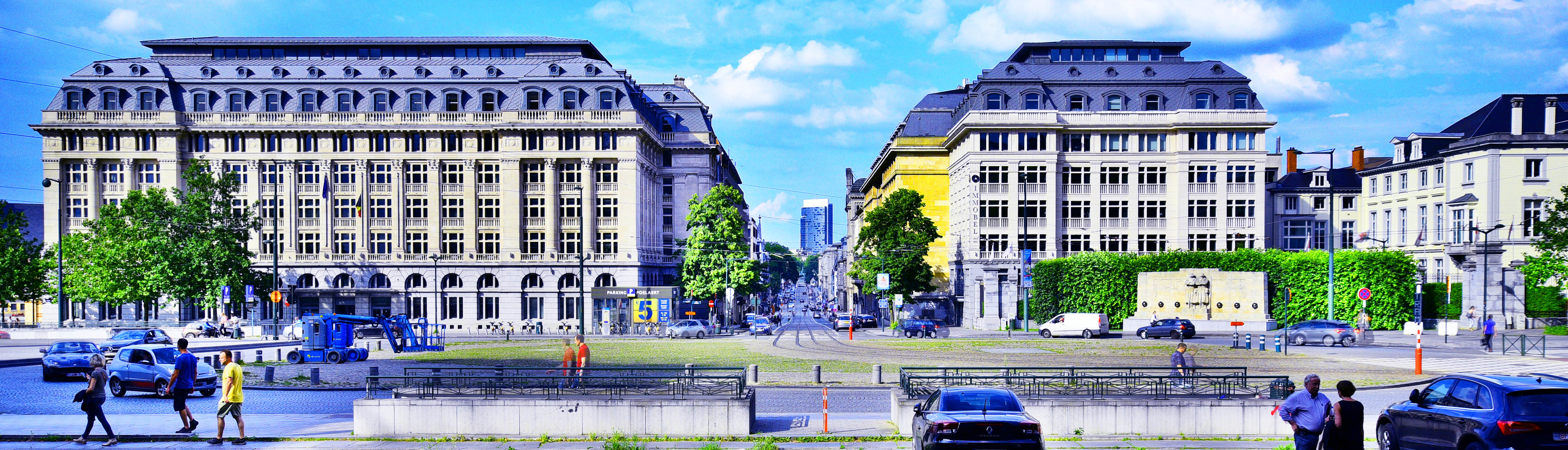
The Place Poelaert seen from the stairs of the Palace of Justice

== Places of interest ==
Next to the Palace of Justice, on the Place Poelaert, stand two war memorials: the Belgian Infantry Memorial by Edouard Vereycken (1935) and the Anglo-Belgian Memorial by Charles Sargeant Jagger (1923). In addition, the Poelaert Elevators, in popular language the Elevators of the Marolles, are a set of two public lifts that connects the upper and lower town between the Place Poelaert and the Square Breughel l'Ancien/Breughel de Oudeplein. They were executed by the AVA Architects office, under the coordination of the architect Patrice Neirinck, and were inaugurated in June 2002.

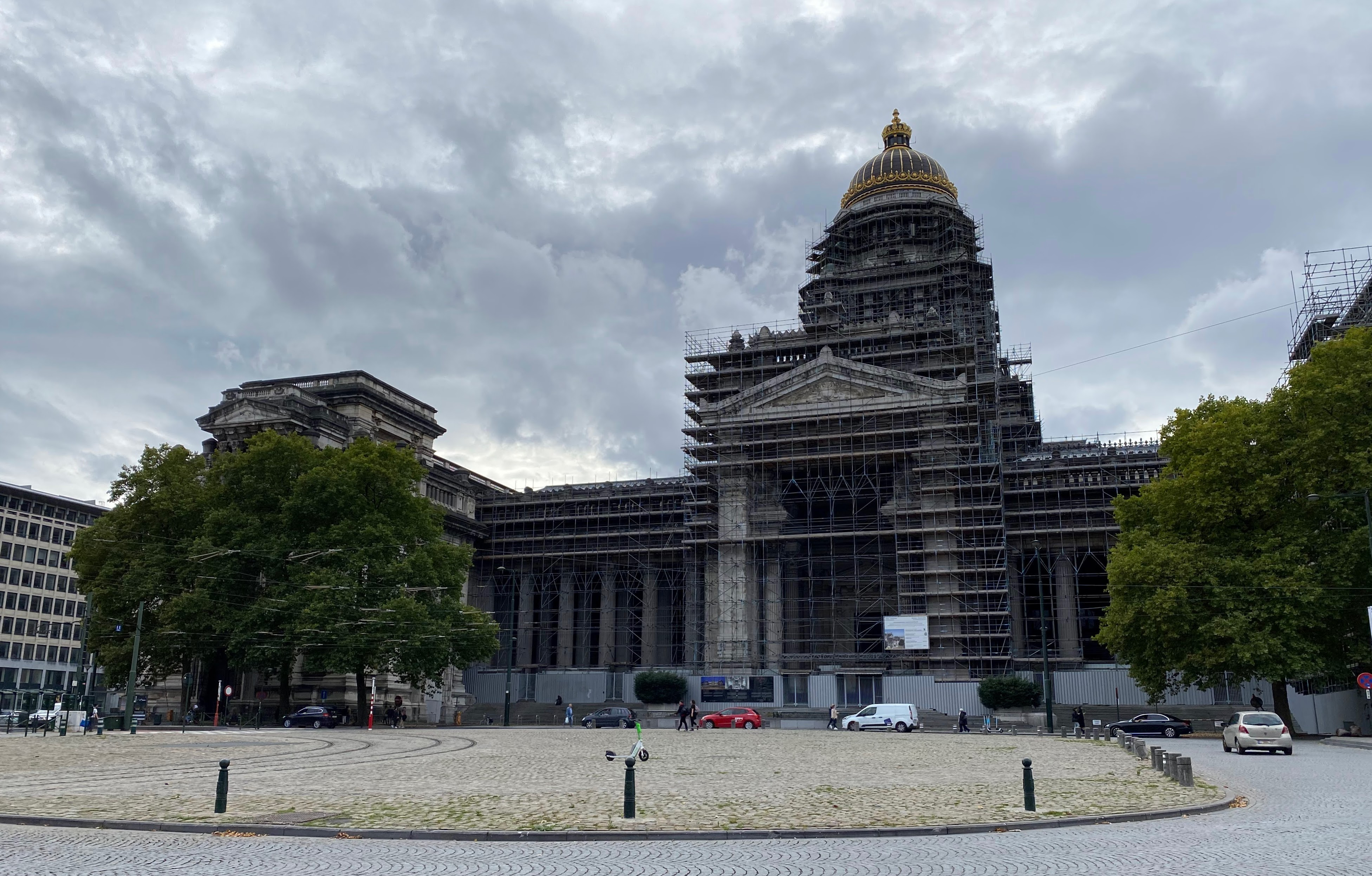
Palace of Justice (Poelaert, 1883)

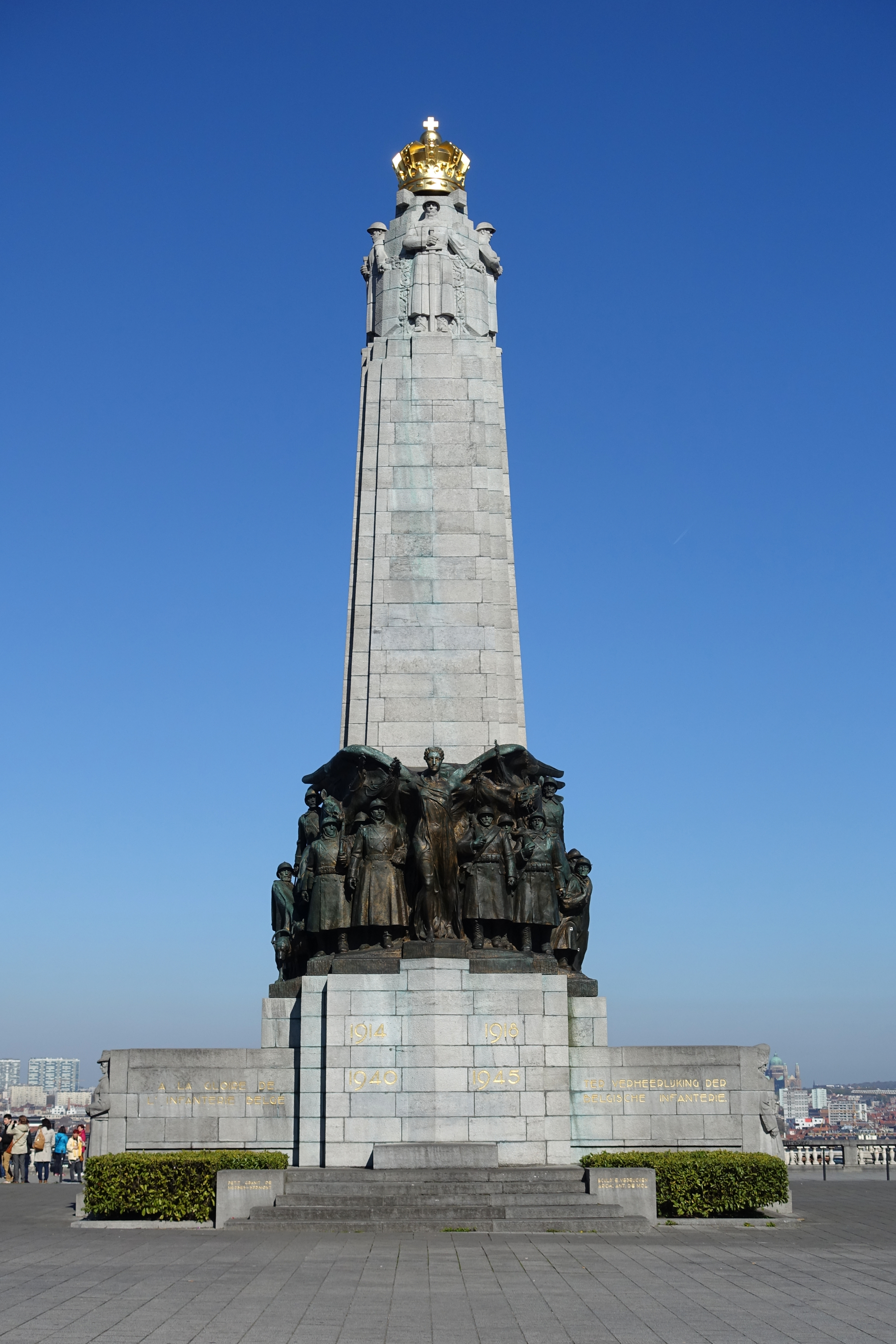
Belgian Infantry Memorial (Vereycken, 1935)

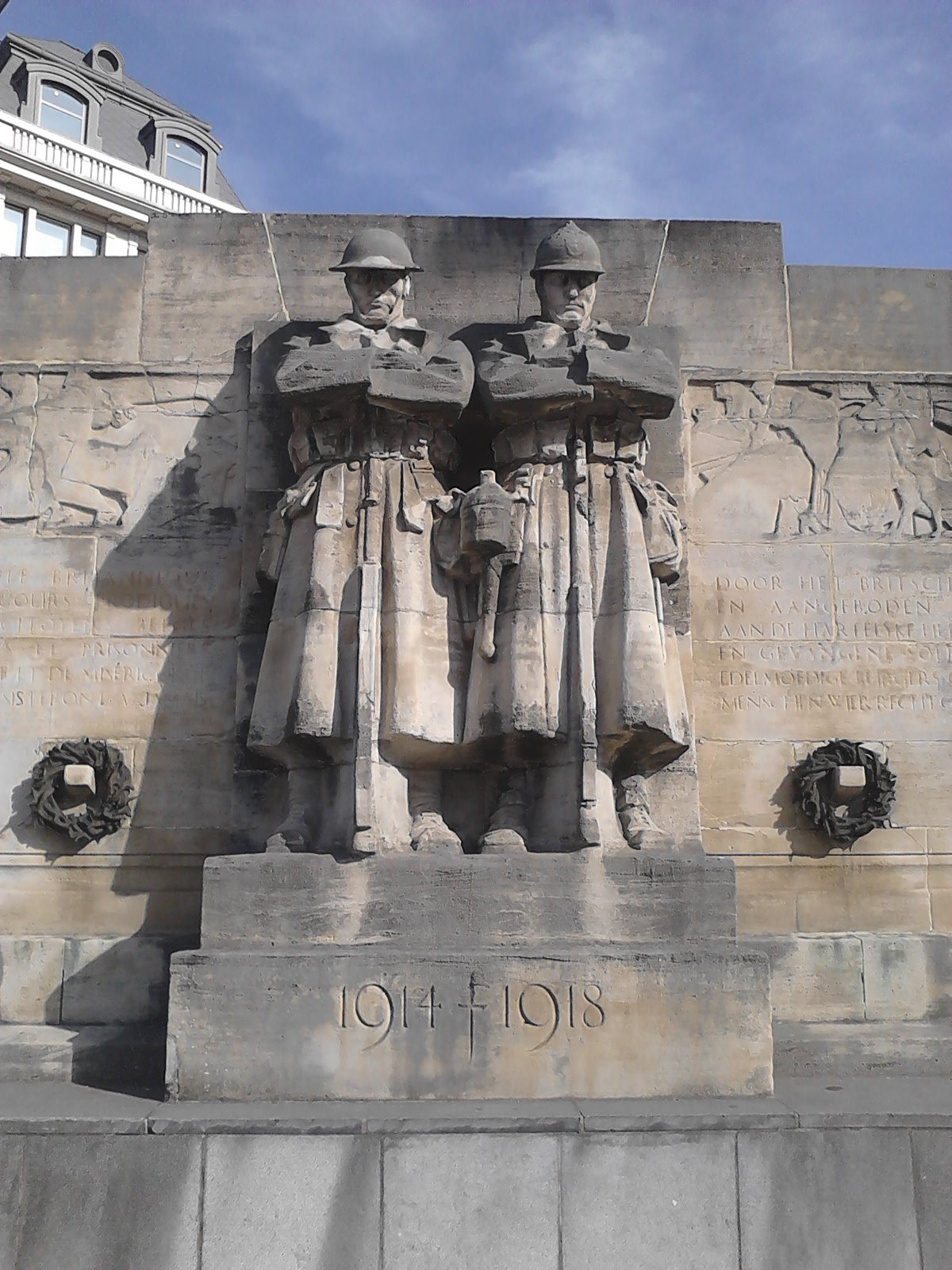
Anglo-Belgian Memorial (Sargeant Jagger, 1923)

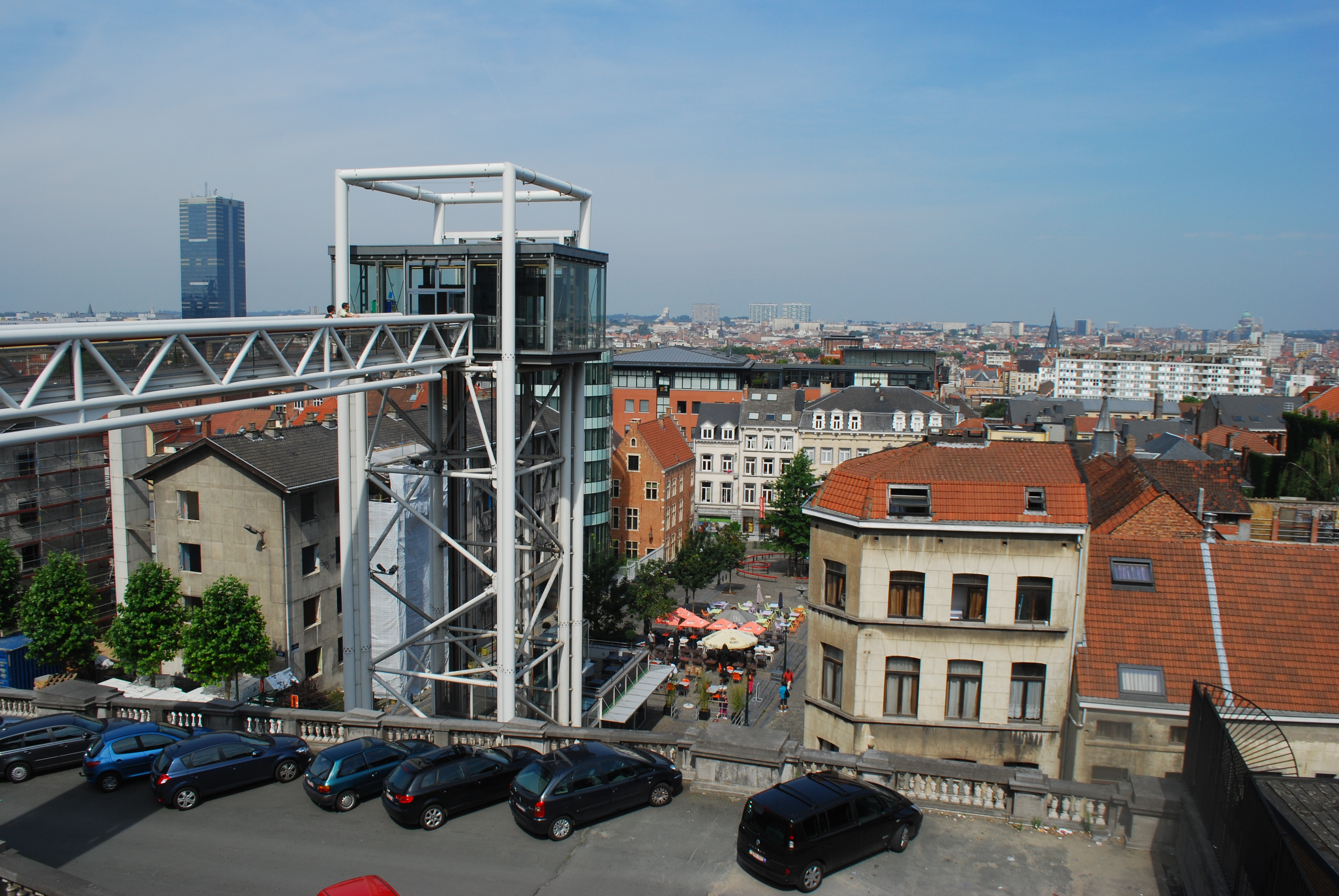
Poelaert Elevators (Neirinck, 2002)

== Panoramic view and surroundings ==
The Place Poelaert is a popular viewpoint in Brussels. From the elevated vantage point, the tower of Brussels' Town Hall on the Grand-Place/Grote Markt (main square) is visible. On a sunny day, the Basilica of the Sacred Heart in Koekelberg and the Atomium on the Heysel/Heizel Plateau in northern Brussels can be seen.

== See also ==
- History of Brussels
- Belgium in the long nineteenth century
