= Annie Carter =

Annie Carter may refer to:

- Annie Carter (EastEnders), a character on the British TV soap opera EastEnders
- Annie Bindon Carter (1883–1969), British businesswoman and philanthropist

== See also ==
- Anne Carter (disambiguation)
