= Belgian Infantry Memorial, Brussels =

Monument in Brussels, Belgium

Belgian Infantry Memorial
- Monument à l'Infanterie Belge (French); Monument voor de Belgische Infanterie (Dutch)
- Brussels, Belgium
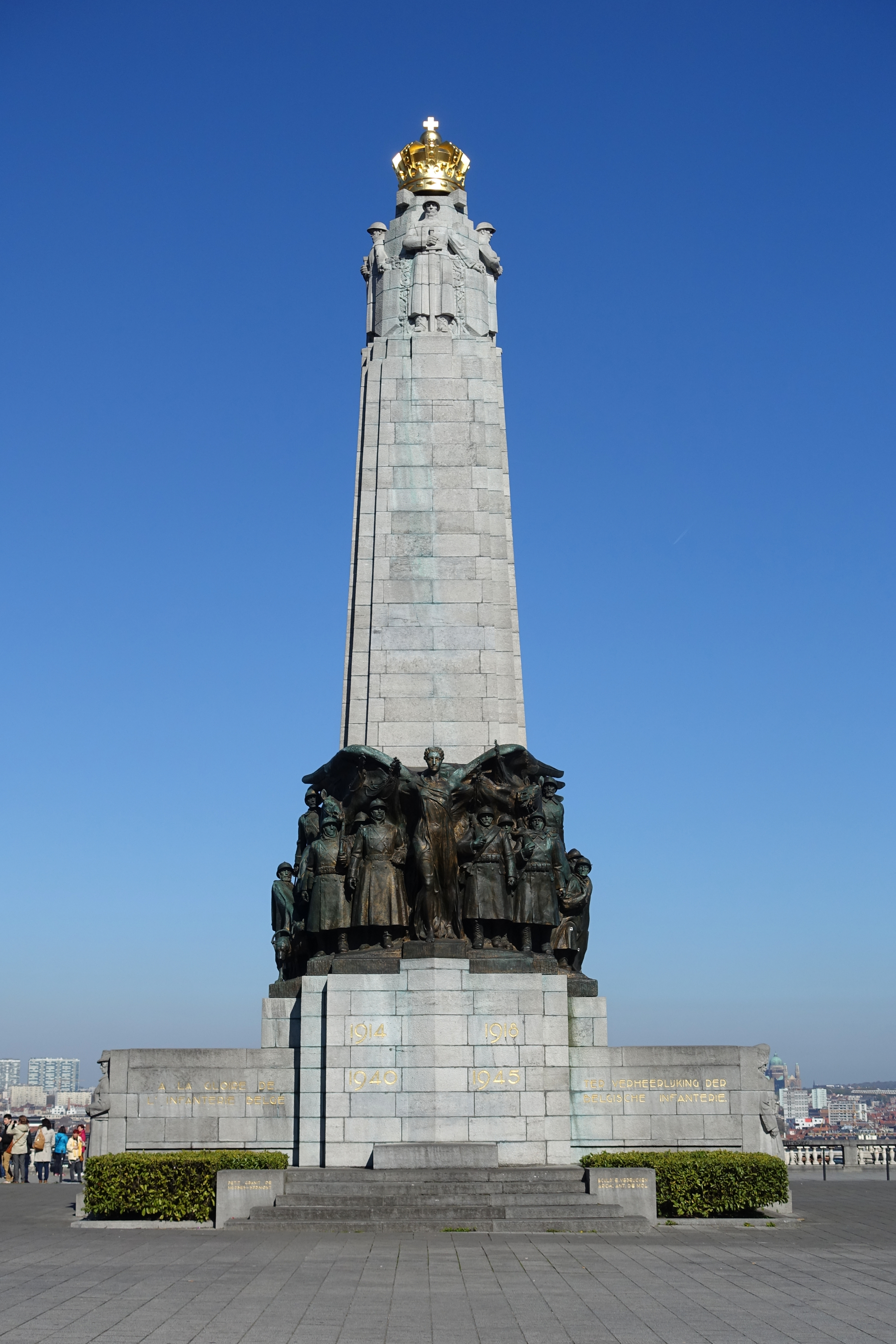
- For the Belgian foot soldiers who fought in World War I and World War II
- Location: 50.837795°N 4.352506°E; Place Poelaert / Poelaertplein; 1000 City of Brussels, Brussels-Capital Region, Belgium
- Designed by: Edouard Vereycken
- A LA GLOIRE D'INFANTERIE BELGE PETIT GRANIT DE MERBES-SPRIMONT SALUS PATRIAE SUPREMA LEX AUX FANTASSINS MORTS POUR LA PATRIE 1914 - 1918 1940 - 1945

The Belgian Infantry Memorial (French: Monument à l'Infanterie Belge; Dutch: Monument voor de Belgische Infanterie) is a monument in Brussels, Belgium, which stands in memory of the Belgian foot soldiers who fought in World War I and World War II. Designed by Edouard Vereycken, the memorial stands in front of the Palace of Justice and across the Place Poelaert/Poelaertplein from the Anglo-Belgian War Memorial. The memorial rests on a raised platform that overlooks Brussels' city centre. Translated into English, the inscription reads: "To the infantrymen who died for their country".

== See also ==
- History of Brussels
- Belgium in the long nineteenth century
