= Poelaert Elevators =

Public elevator at Marolles, Brussels, Belgium

- Ascenseurs Poelaert (French); Poelaertliften (Dutch)
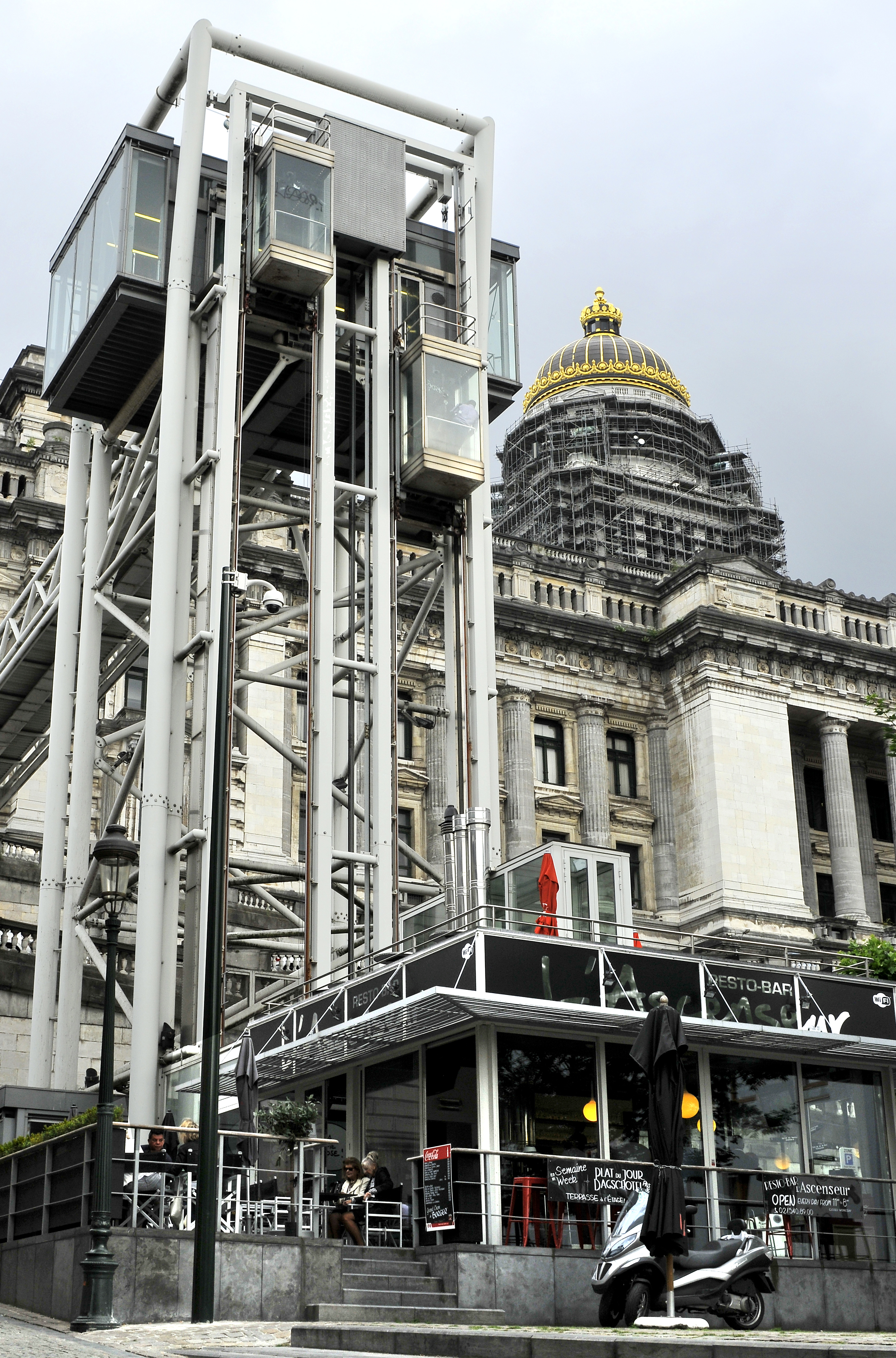
- View of the lift from the Square Breughel l'Ancien/Breughel de Oudeplein
- Alternative names: Ascenseurs des Marolles (French); Liften van de Marollen (Dutch)

General information
- Location: Marollen, City of Brussels, Belgium
- Coordinates: 50°50′16.9″N 4°21′04″E
- Inaugurated: June 2002
- Renovated: 2021
- Cost: 78 million Belgian francs
- Owner: STIB/MIVB
- Height: 27.7 m (91 ft)

Technical details
- Lifts/elevators: 2

Design and construction
- Architect: Patrice Neirinck
- Architecture firm: AVA Architects
- Main contractor: CFE

Renovating team
- Structural engineer: Van Eycken Metal Construction

Other information
- Seating capacity: 32

The Poelaert Elevators (French: Ascenseurs Poelaert; Dutch: Poelaertliften), in popular language Elevators of the Marolles (French: Ascenseurs des Marolles; Dutch: Liften van de Marollen) is a public elevator in the Marolles/Marollen district of Brussels, Belgium. It connects the lower and upper town at the Square Breughel l'Ancien/Breughel de Oudeplein with the Place Poelaert/Poelaertplein, in the vicinity of the Palace of Justice. The elevator consists of two independent elevators, hence the plural elevators (French: ascenseurs; Dutch: liften) sometimes used for its name.

== Construction ==
The idea of building a means of transport connecting the Marolles/Marollen neighbourhood and the Place Poelaert/Poelaertplein is much older; in the 19th century, it was proposed to build a funicular for this purpose. In the early 1990s, the architect Patrice Neirinck of AVA Architects promoted the concept of building a vertical elevator. The proposal sought to "open up the Marolles district" and "revitalise the Square Breughel l'Ancien/Breughel de Oudeplein", located at the bottom, making it a crossing point.

CFE was appointed as the general contractor, and the supply of the two elevators and the electromechanical systems were provided by Schindler Group. The architectural project was executed by the AVA Architects office, under the coordination of the architect Patrice Neirinck, while the Verdeyen & Moenaert took care of the stability study.

The construction cost about 78 million Belgian francs (equivalent to about €2 million), of which 51 million francs (about €1.25 million) for the bulk of the investment, and 27 million francs (about €676,000) for the elevators. Funding was provided by the Brussels-Capital Region and the Belgian Federal Government under a cooperation agreement. The Ministry of Communications and Infrastructure was in charge of the project management, receiving technical assistance from the Directorate of Electromechanical Constructions.

After the construction of the tower, the future metal walkway was installed between the upper part and the Place Poelaert. The 36-metre-long (118 ft) walkway was made at Geel, Antwerp, and transported to Brussels by a special convoy, arriving on the esplanade at the Palace of Justice around 10:00 on 13 October 2001. The entire lift was inaugurated in June 2002 and became one of the area's most popular tourist attractions. Its administration and operation was entrusted by the municipality to the Brussels Intercommunal Transport Company (STIB/MIVB).

== Operation ==
The operation of the new elevator was marked by numerous technical problems, the first being reported only one month after the inauguration, on 21 July 2002. In 2019, for example, STIB/MIVB had to intervene a total of 131 times to remedy the faults that occurred at the two elevators: 43 wedges in one of them, 88 wedges in the other. The main reasons that led to the shutdown of the elevators were the unfavorable weather conditions and vandalism.

In April 2018, 1,300 colored T-shirts were hung from the structure of the elevator, as part of the work entitled If I Had Wings, a cultural experiment by the Finnish artist Kaarina Kaikkonen.

In July 2020, the Minister for Mobility and Public Works of the Brussels-Capital Region, Elke Van den Brandt, confirmed that the lift would be rehabilitated in the first quarter of 2021.

About a million people use the elevator every year.

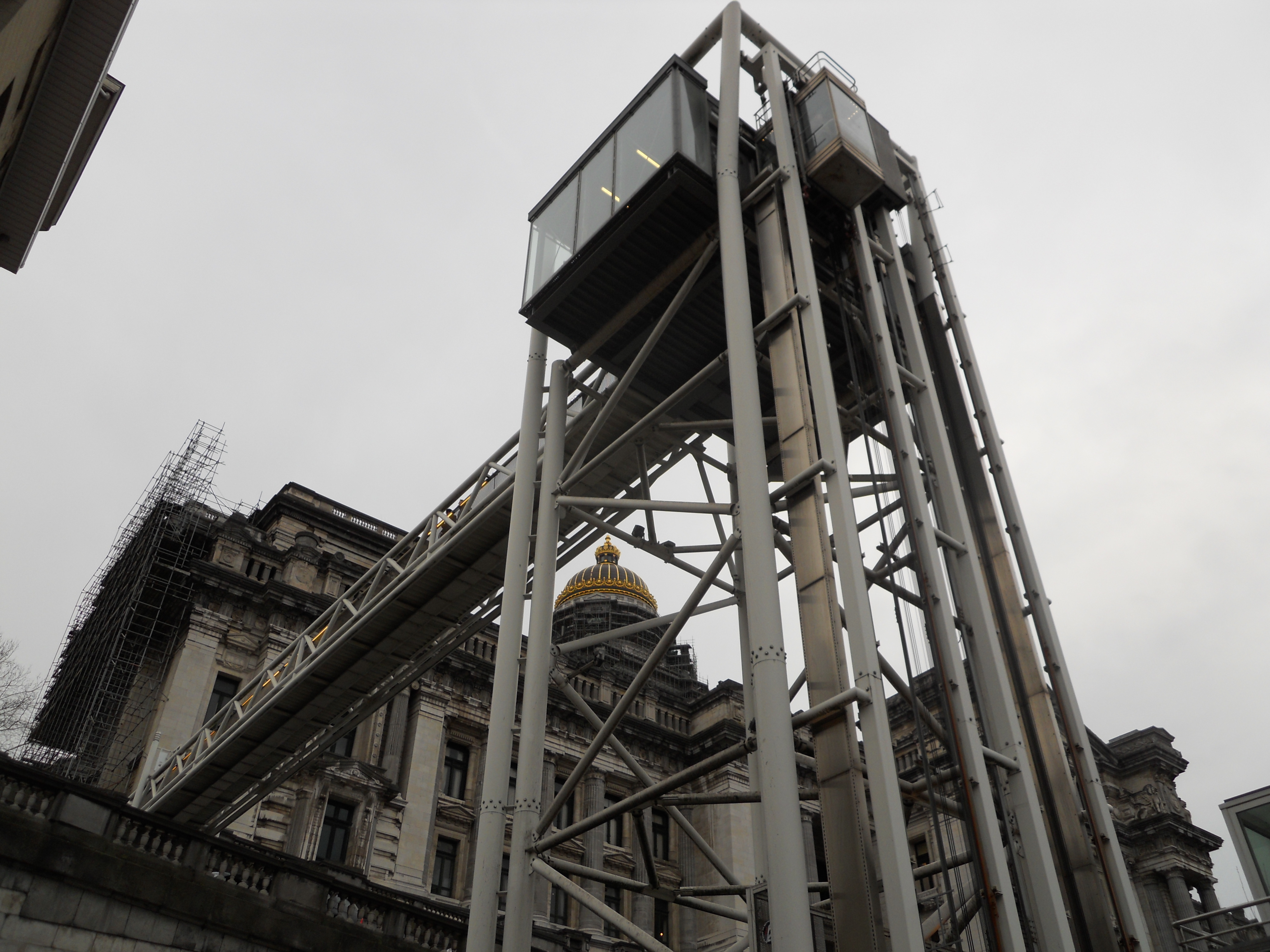
View from the base of the elevator

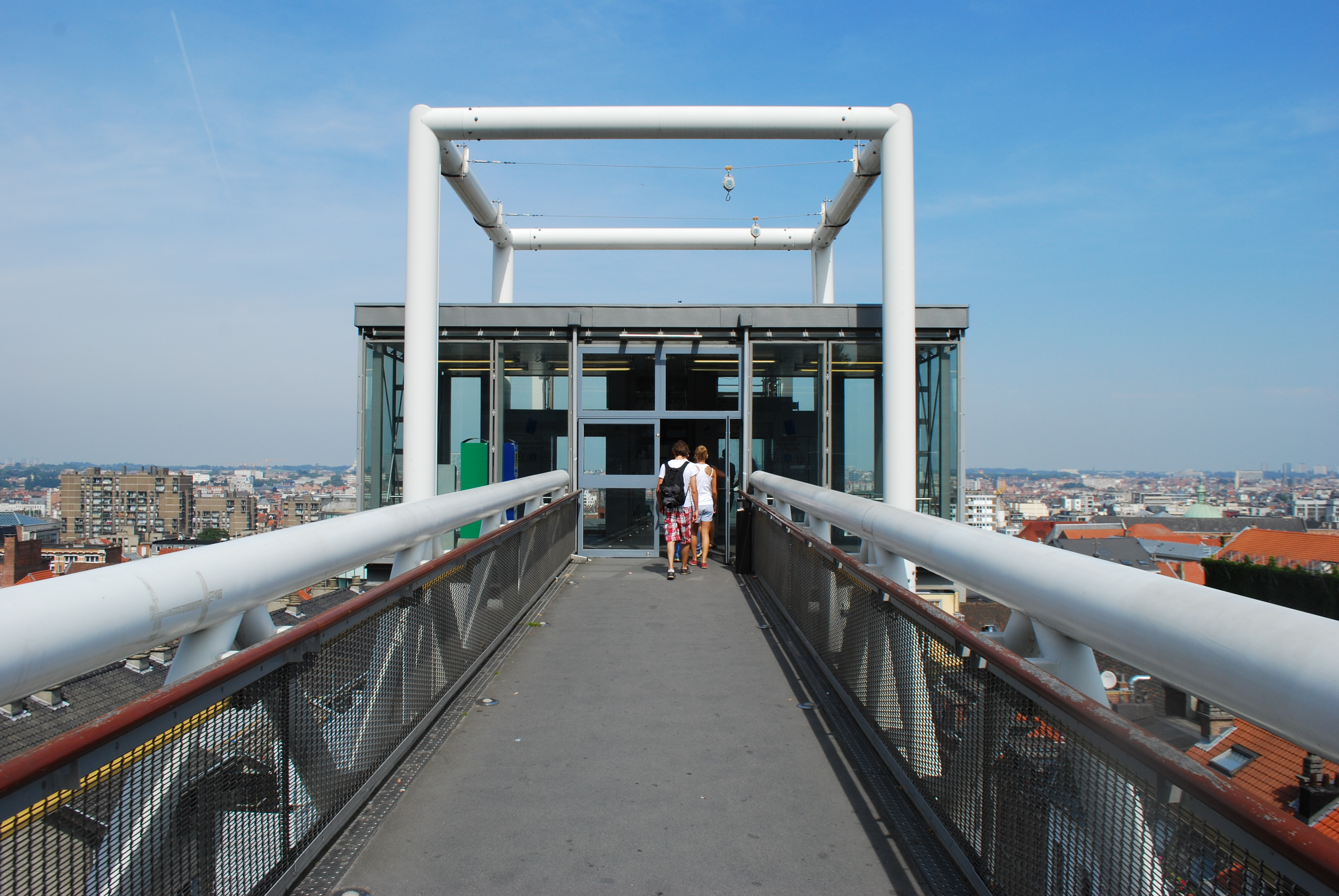
The metal walkway leading to the elevator

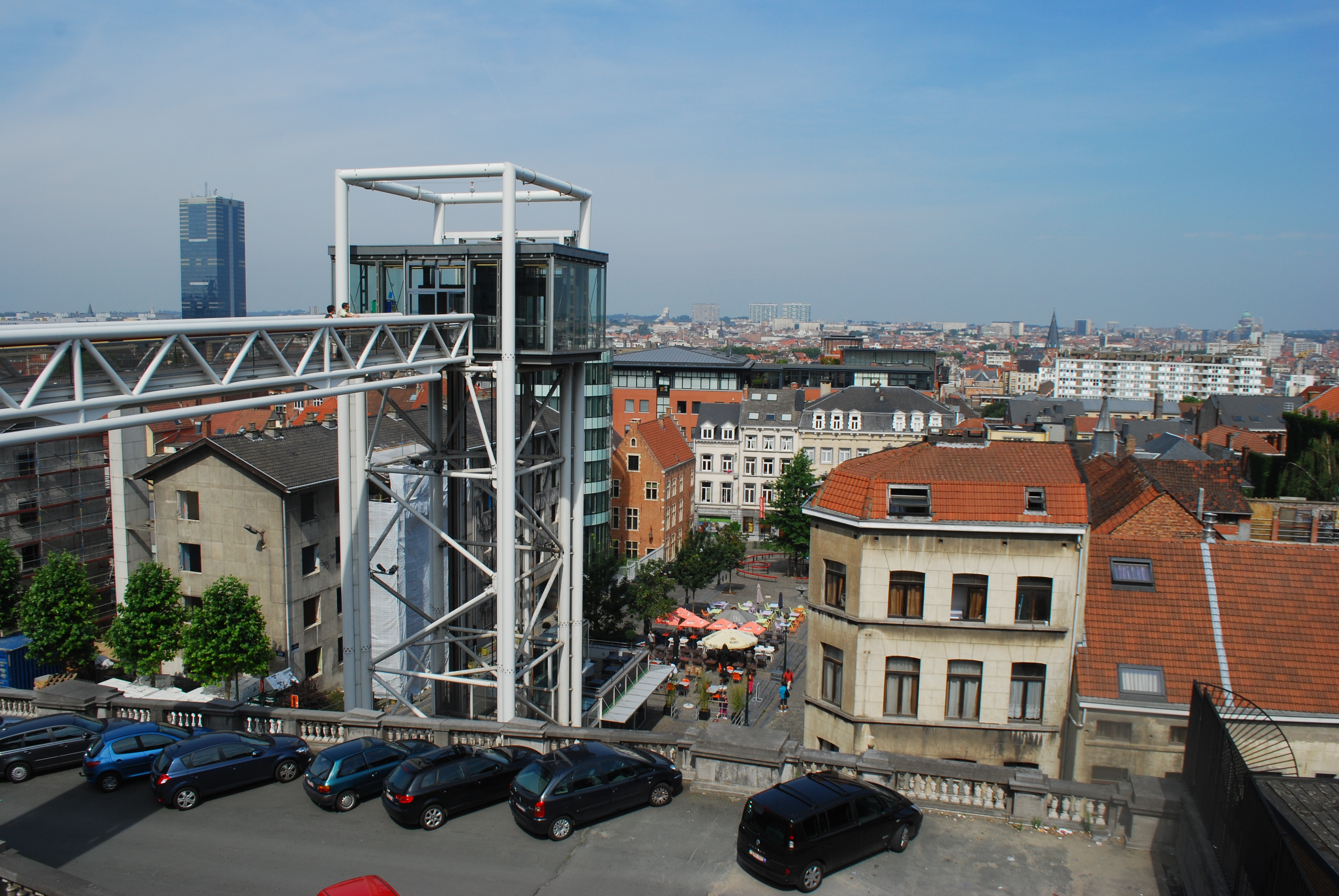
View from the Place Poelaert/Poelaertplein

== Specifications ==
The Poelaert Elevators have the following specifications:

Specifications
Characteristics	Value
Number of elevators	2
Height	27.70 m
Walkway length	35.50 m
Total weight	100 t
Max load	1,250 kg (16 people per cabin)
Speed	1 m/s
