= David Jagger =

English painter

- Portrait of James Henry Dowd (1929)
- Born: 1891; Kilnhurst, Rotherham, Yorkshire, England
- Died: 1958 (aged 66–67)
- Education: Sheffield School of Art
- Known for: Portrait painting
- Notable work: Robert Baden-Powell, Winston Churchill
- Movement: Royal Society of Portrait Painters (RP), Royal Institute of Oil Painters (ROI)
- Patrons: The Scout Association

David Jagger (1891–1958) was an acclaimed and prolific English portrait painter. He was renowned for his commissioned portraits of London's high society and British aristocracy. Notable portraits include those of Robert Baden-Powell (1929), Queen Mary (1930 and 1932), King George VI (1937), Winston Churchill (1939), Vivien Leigh (1941) and Prince Philip, Duke of Edinburgh (1958).

== Personal life ==
David Jagger was born in Kilnhurst, near Rotherham, in 1891. He was the son of colliery manager Enoch Jagger and his wife Mary Sargeant. He had two older siblings, a sister Edith Jagger (1881–1977) and brother Charles Sargeant Jagger (1885–1934). Edith became a painter of still lifes, and co-founded the charitable organisation Painted Fabrics. Charles became a celebrated sculptor.

David Jagger studied at the Sheffield School of Art, briefly studying at the same time with both his elder sister and brother. An accomplished draughtsman and skilled illustrator, he became a medal-winning student in mural design and painting. After his art education finished, he moved to London. Initially he obtained employment in a commercial art studio and produced portraits in the evening. He became a leading exhibitor with several societies including the Royal Institute of Oil Painters (ROI) and Royal Society of Portrait Painters (RP). He regularly exhibited at the Summer Exhibition at the Royal Academy and the Royal Society of British Artists (RBA). His paintings brought him both critical and commercial success, which enabled him to set up his own professional portrait studio in Chelsea, south-west London. After the Great War finished, he met and fell in love with Catherine Gardiner, she immediately became his muse and features in many key work from the period. The couple married in 1921.

‘Kitty’ Jagger appeared in many of her husband's most accomplished works of the period, usually listed under a pseudonym. Portraits of her by her husband were exhibited with the principal exhibiting societies across London, most notably the Royal Academy where three large portraits of her were shown between 1923 and 1929 to great acclaim, those works being The Jade Necklace (1923), Eve (1925) and Mrs. David Jagger (1929). Eight further canvases were exhibited at the Walker Art Gallery in Liverpool between 1921 and 1928, two of which were acquired by municipal art galleries: Kathleen (1922) by the Williamson Art Gallery and Museum, and Needlework (1921) by the Walker Art Gallery where the work is currently listed as Sewing. Other portraits of her exhibited in London received widespread praise

Throughout the 1930s his austere and highly finished portraits were in great demand by London's elite, for which there was often a waiting list. A major solo exhibition David Jagger was held at the J. Leger Galleries in London in 1935. The display was an informal retrospective and featured sixty-six paintings. The exhibition received glowing reviews and was extended due to popular demand. In 1939, he arranged and promoted a touring exhibition, The Art of the Jagger Family, which included work by all three Jagger siblings.

== Key works ==
Jagger's most reproduced work is the portrait of Robert Baden-Powell, as presented to Lord Baden-Powell during the Coming of Age Jamboree on 10 August 1929. Innumerable copies of this portrait have been created, and are displayed on Scouting premises worldwide. The original is on display at Baden-Powell House, London, the former headquarters of The Scout Association. A reproduction is in the Office of the Secretary General of the World Organization of the Scout Movement in Geneva, Switzerland.

Jagger produced portraits of many successful and illustrious people; many were first exhibited at the Royal Academy between 1917 and 1958. Other interesting early subjects include the artist Robert Fowler (1916), physician Dr. Thomas Forrest Cotton (1926), and Sheffield benefactor and business man J.G. Graves (1920). He produced eighteen military portraits, including an intimate study of his brother, Charles Sargeant Jagger entitled Portrait of an Army Officer (1917). He also painted many anonymous sitters, such as Portrait of an Officer of the RAF (1941), The Silk Scarf (1926), Negro Profile (1935), and Olga (1936). His most successful works were portraits of women, ranging from Lady Millicent Taylour (1918) through to Mrs Thelma Bader, wife of Wing Commander Douglas Bader (1942). His final decade was filled with predominately male commissioned portraits, culminating in his final canvas, an unfinished portrait of Prince Philip, Duke of Edinburgh (1958)

Throughout his career Jagger also painted landscapes for his own amusement, most of which were never exhibited. He produced landscape paintings in Ireland, France, Spain and Italy. Closer to home, his favoured views were picturesque scenes in Derbyshire, Dorset and Sussex.

== Reassessment ==
As a principal portraitist working in London during the inter-war years Jagger's work has undergone a reappraisal in recent years. This ongoing re-evaluation of contemporary British artists working in the first half of the twentieth century has led to several notable canvases by David Jagger appearing at auction in London. His life and work is the subject of a forthcoming publication, 'The Art of the Jagger Family' by Timothy Dickson and a separate catalogue raisonnè is also under preparation.

== See also ==
- Baden-Powell House
- Don Potter
