= Catherine Gardiner =

British actress (1900–1982)

- Born: 27 April 1900; Chelsea, London, England
- Died: 11 July 1982 (aged 81); Kingston upon Thames, England
- Other names: Katherine 'Kitty' Jagger
- Occupation(s): Stage actress, artists' model, amateur golfer, amateur artist
- Spouse: David Jagger
- Children: Brian

Catherine Gardiner (27 April 1900 - 11 August 1982) was a British theatre actress, artists' model, amateur golfer and amateur artist. She was married to the portrait painter David Jagger RP, ROI (1891-1958).

== Married life ==
After her marriage in 1921 to David Jagger she changed the spelling of her first name to Katherine. Her only child, Brian, was born in November 1921, prior to which, she abandoned her career as a stage actress. ‘Kitty’ Jagger appeared in many of her husband's most accomplished works of the period, usually listed under a pseudonym. Portraits of her by her husband were exhibited with the principal exhibiting societies across London, most notably the Royal Academy where three large portraits of her were shown between 1923 and 1929 to great acclaim, those works being The Jade Necklace (1923), Eve (1925) and Mrs. David Jagger (1929). Eight further canvases were exhibited at the Walker Art Gallery in Liverpool between 1921 and 1928, two of which were acquired by municipal art galleries: Kathleen (1922) by the Williamson Art Gallery and Museum, and Needlework (1921) by the Walker Art Gallery where the work is currently listed as Sewing. Other portraits of her exhibited in London received widespread praise

Her photogenic beauty led to many images of her appearing in London society magazines, most notably the Tatler 'Kitty' epitomised the roaring twenties in London and she was often compared to the American actress, Tallulah Bankhead. Throughout the decade she was captured by many leading of London's leading photographers. ‘Kitty’ was a keen amateur golfer who played on major courses in England, Scotland, France and Ireland. She was also a talented amateur artist and a connoisseur of antique furniture. In 1935 she was one of the organisers of a major touring exhibition, ‘Charles Sargeant Jagger - A Memorial Exhibition’ (1935–37). Two portraits of her appeared in her husband's only London solo exhibition at the J. Leger & Son in 1935. In 1940, during the London Blitz she was lucky to survive when an adjoining property to her Chelsea home was destroyed by a bomb.

== Principal portraits ==
Works listed were painted by David Jagger unless indicated otherwise.

- Lady in A Green Jacket (1919), private collection
- New Year's Morning in a Chelsea Studio (1919) by Sir Alfred Munnings, private collection
- On The Hilltop (1920), private collection
- Sketch for 'Needlework (1920/21), private collection
- Needlework (1921), Walker Art Gallery, Liverpool (National Museums Liverpool)
- Eileen (1921), untraced
- Pierette (1921), private collection
- The Yellow Jumper (1921), private collection
- The White Cap (1922), private collection
- Kathleen (1922), Williamson Art Gallery & Museum, Birkenhead, The Wirral
- The Yellow Breakfast Cup (1922), private collection
- Joan (1923), untraced
- Le Chapeau Noir (1923), private collection
- Study for 'The Jade Necklace (1922/23), private collection
- The Jade Necklace (1923), private collection
- Mrs. David Jagger (1925) by Sir Walter Westley Russell, private collection
- Eve (1925), private collection
- The Young Golfer (1927), private collection
- Mrs. David Jagger (c. 1929), private collection
- Mrs. David Jagger (1930), private collection
- Mrs. David Jagger (1934), private collection
- Mrs. David Jagger (1935), private collection
