= Anglo-Belgian Memorial, London =

War memorial in London

Coordinates: 51°30′31.40″N 0°07′14.26″W

Anglo-Belgian Memorial
- {{{country}}}
- For Assistance given by the UK to Belgium during World War I, particularly sheltering Belgian refugees.
- Unveiled: 12 October 1920
- Location: Victoria Embankment, London, England near London
- Designed by: Sir Reginald Blomfield, Victor Rousseau (sculpture)
- "To the British nation from the grateful people of Belgium, 1914–1918"

Listed Building – Grade II*
- Official name: Belgian Monument to the British Nation
- Designated: 05 Feb 1970
- Reference no.: 1066168

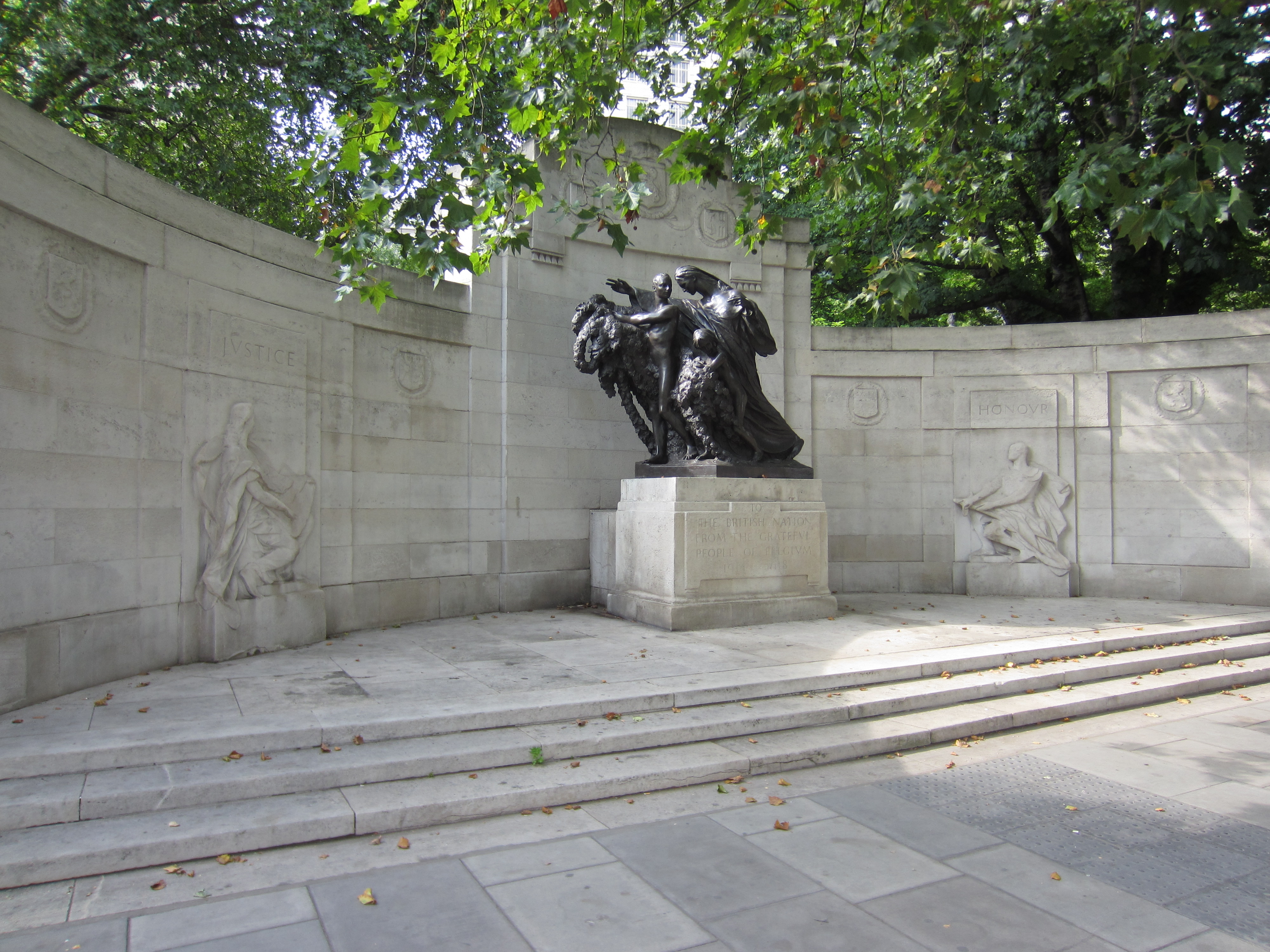
The memorial in 2014

The Anglo-Belgian Memorial, also known as the Belgian Gratitude Memorial, Belgian Refugees Memorial, or the Belgian Monument to the British Nation, is a war memorial on Victoria Embankment in London, opposite Cleopatra's Needle. It was a gift from Belgium, as a mark of thanks for assistance given by the UK during the First World War, and in particular for sheltering thousands of Belgian refugees who fled from the war. It is a Grade II* listed building.

Plans for a Belgian war memorial in London were proposed by a group of Belgians in 1916, to be funded by public subscription. The memorial was designed by Sir Reginald Blomfield. Its main feature is a central bronze sculpture by Belgian sculptor Victor Rousseau, who himself spent time as a refugee in London during the war. The sculpture was cast by A.B. Burton at the Thames Ditton Foundry. It depicts a Belgian woman, accompanied by a boy and a girl carrying garlands of flowers. The bronze stands on a stone plinth which bears the inscription, "To the British nation from the grateful people of Belgium, 1914–1918".

The central group is sheltered by a curved screen wall of Portland stone, which bears two further relief sculptures (now quite worn) representing "Justice" (left) and "Honour" (right). The wall also bears carved wreaths and nine heraldic shields, representing the provinces of Belgium: Brabant, Antwerp, Liège, Hainault, Namur, Limburg, Luxembourg, East Flanders and West Flanders.

Vandals damaged the memorial in July 1920, while it was under construction, and for a time it was guarded by a nightwatchman. It was unveiled by Princess Clémentine of Belgium at a ceremony on 12 October 1920, the fifth anniversary of the execution of British nurse Edith Cavell in Brussels. The ceremony was attended by the Prime Minister of Belgium Leon Delacroix, and the gift was formally accepted on behalf of the British nation by Lord Curzon. In response, an Anglo-Belgian Memorial was erected in Brussels in 1923, designed by British sculptor Charles Sargeant Jagger.

The memorial became a Grade II listed building in 1970, and was upgraded to Grade II* in 2014.

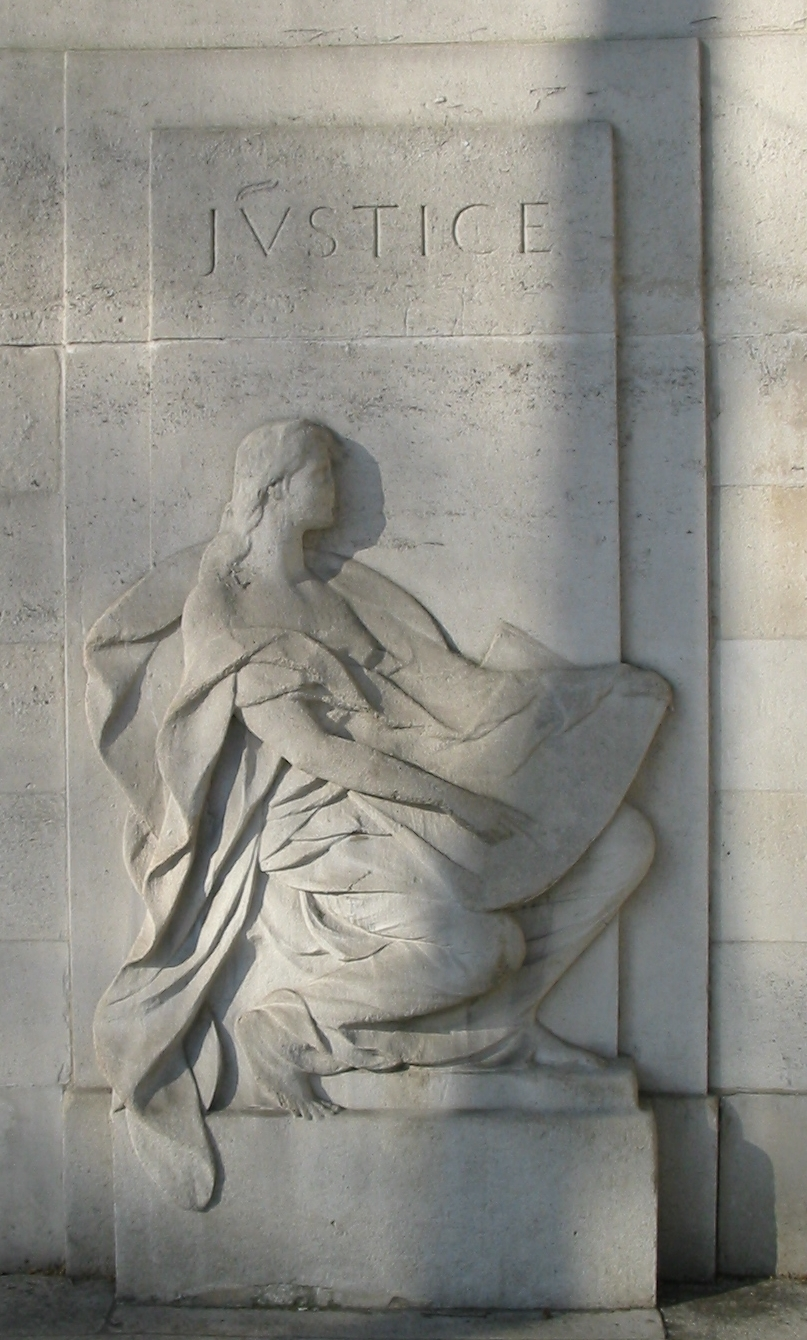
Justice (left)

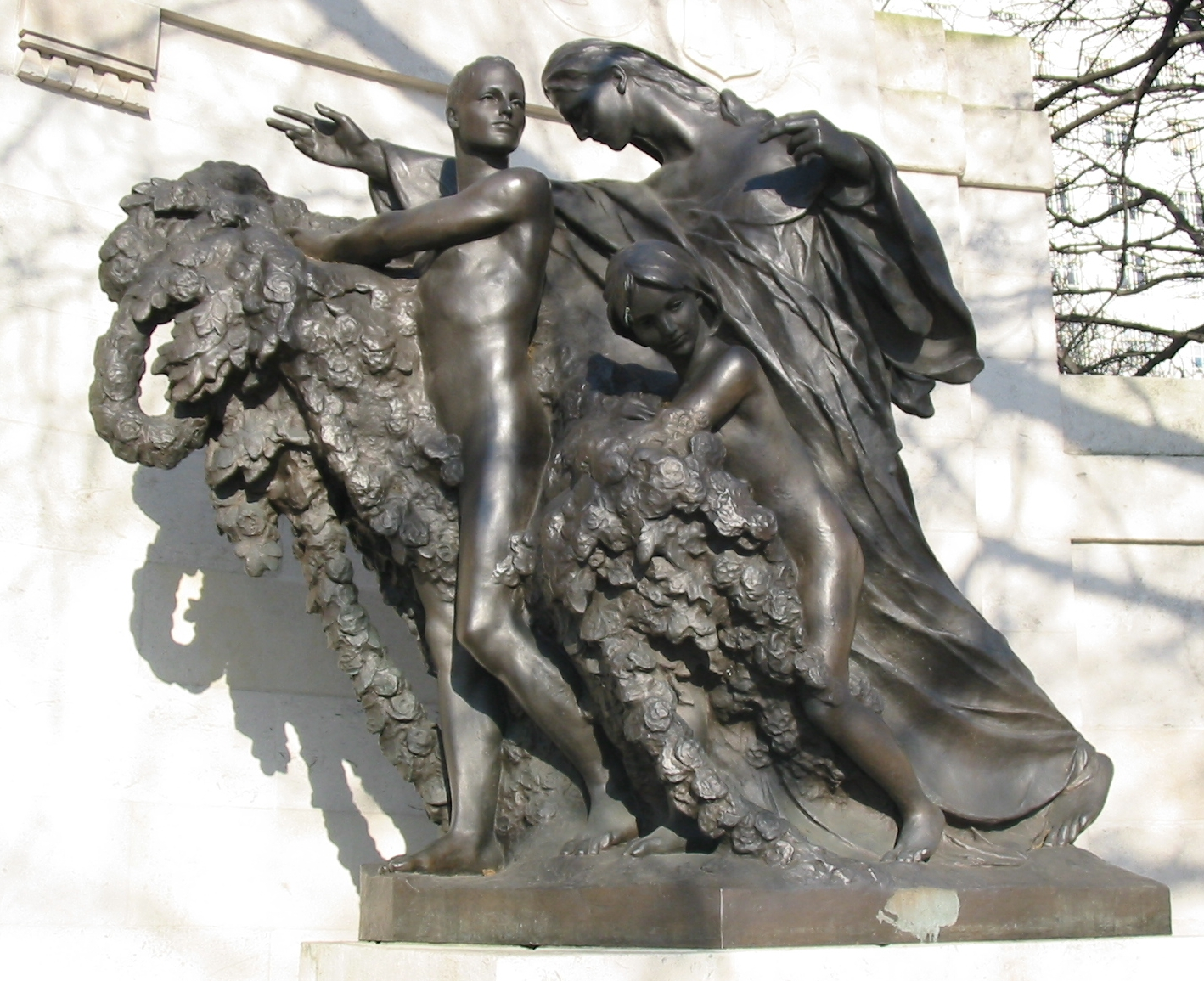
Central bronze sculpture group

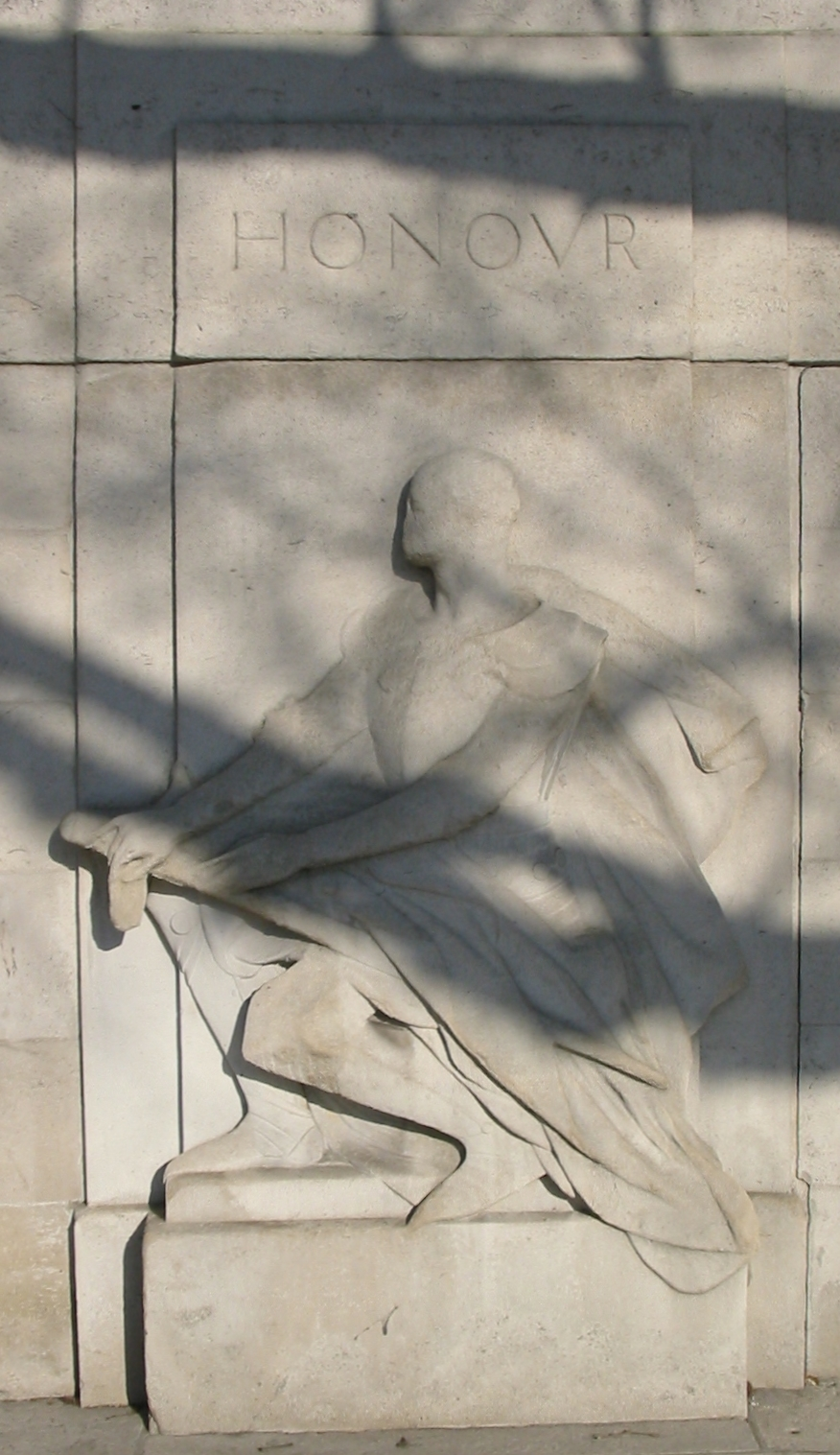
Honour (right)

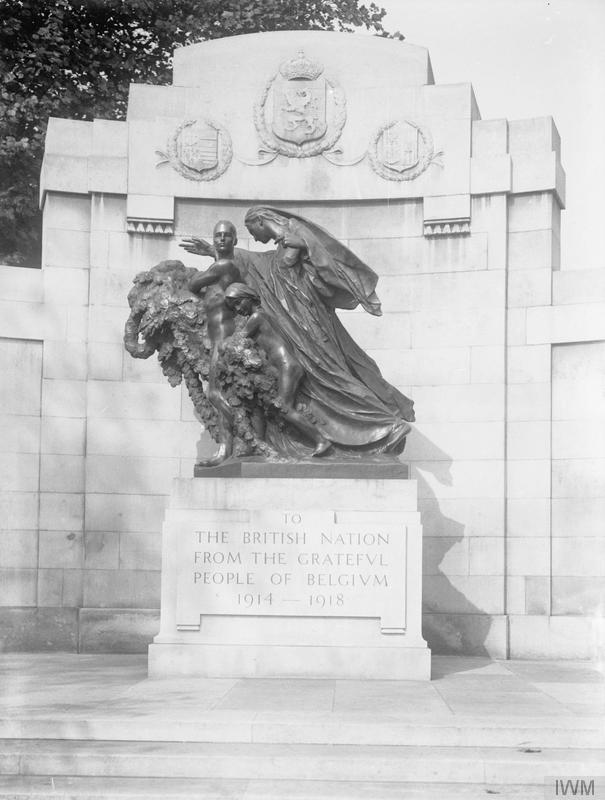
Memorial in the interwar period

== See also ==
- Grade II* listed war memorials in England
