= The Graphic =

British weekly illustrated newspaper

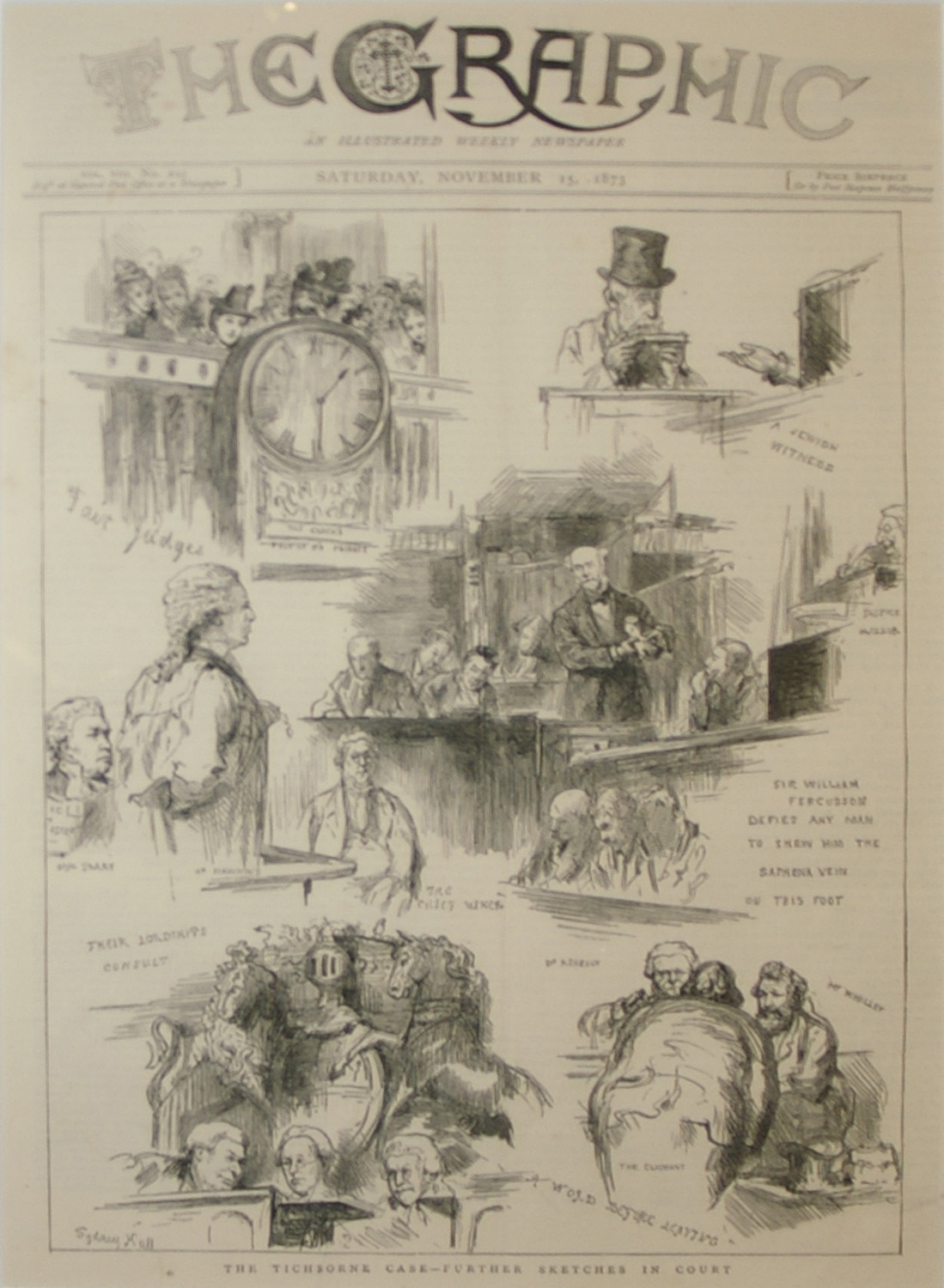
- Front page of The Graphic during the Tichborne case in 1873
- Type: Weekly newspaper
- Owner: Illustrated Newspapers Ltd.
- Founder(s): William Luson Thomas and Lewis Samuel Thomas
- Editor: Henry Sutherland Edwards
- Founded: 4 December 1869; 156 years ago
- Ceased publication: August 1932; 94 years ago
- Language: English
- City: London
- Country: United Kingdom
- Sister newspapers: The Daily Graphic (1890–1926)

The Graphic was a British weekly illustrated newspaper, first published on 4 December 1869 by William Luson Thomas's company, Illustrated Newspapers Ltd with Thomas's brother, Lewis Samuel Thomas, as a co-founder. The Graphic was set up as a rival to the popular Illustrated London News.

In addition to its home market, the paper had subscribers all around the British Empire and North America. The Graphic sought to bring awareness to prevailing issues in the British empire such as poverty, homelessness, and public health. The newspaper aimed to cover home news and news from around the Empire, and devoted much attention to literature, arts, sciences, the fashionable world, sport, music and opera. Royal occasions, national celebrations, and ceremonies were also given prominent coverage. The newspaper used its illustrations to capture authentic scenes throughout London and had an immense influence on the art world with many admirers including Vincent van Gogh and Hubert von Herkomer, who was also an early contributor of illustrations.

From 1890 until 1926, Thomas's company, H. R. Baines & Co., published The Daily Graphic (a name later revived by Kemsley Newspapers between 1946 and 1952).

== Publication history ==
=== Background ===
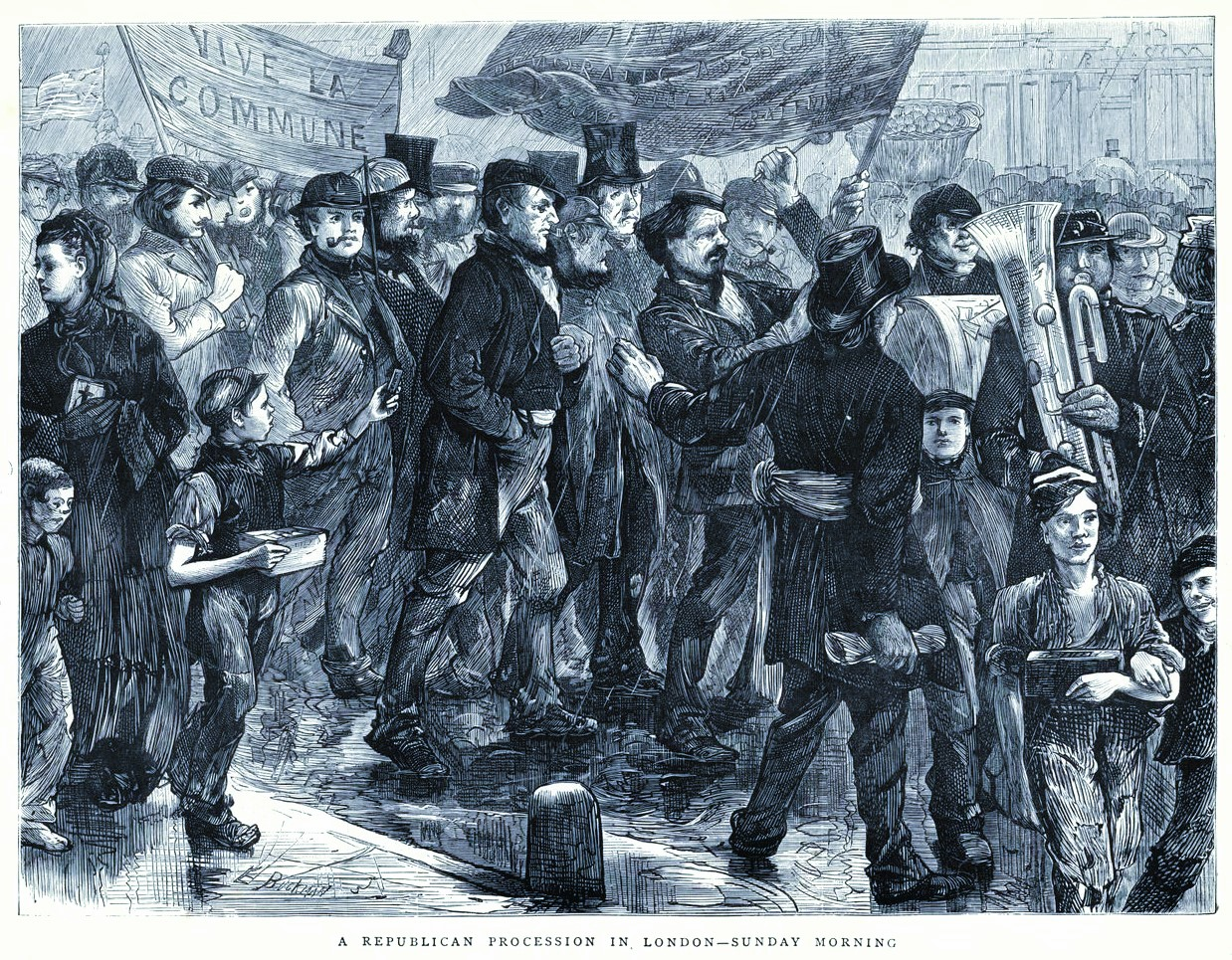
Illustration of a workers' demonstration in London on Sunday April 16, 1871 in support of the Paris Commune

William Luson Thomas was a successful artist, wood-engraver and social reformer. Thomas also had an engraving establishment of his own and, aided by a large staff, illustrated and engraved numerous standard works. Exasperated and angered by the unsympathetic treatment of artists by the world's most successful illustrated paper, The Illustrated London News, and having a good business sense, Thomas resolved to set up an opposition. His illustrated paper, despite being more expensive than its competition, became an immediate success.

=== Realization ===
When it began in 1869, the newspaper was printed in a rented house. The first editor was Henry Sutherland Edwards. The Graphic was published on Saturdays and its original cover price was sixpence, while the Illustrated London News was fivepence. A successful artist himself, founder Thomas recruited gifted artists, including Luke Fildes, Hubert von Herkomer, Frank Holl, and John Everett Millais. In its first year, it described itself to advertisers as "a superior illustrated weekly newspaper, containing twenty-four pages imperial folio, printed on fine toned paper of beautiful quality, made expressly for the purpose and admirably adapted for the display of engravings."

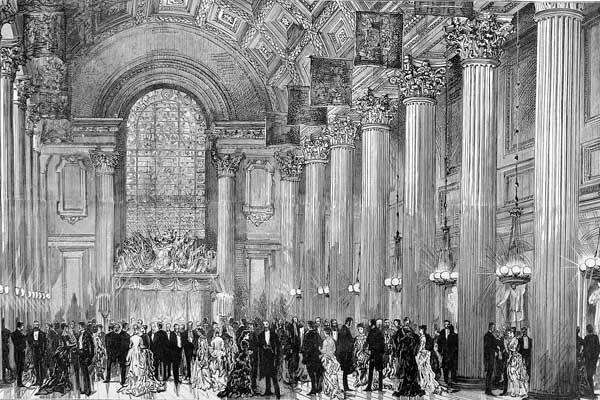
An illustration from the newspaper from 1884

The premature death of co-founder Lewis Samuel Thomas in 1872 "as one of the founders of this newspaper, [and who] took an active interest in its management" left a marked gap in the early history of the publication.

By 1882, the company owned three buildings and twenty printing presses, and employed more than 1,000 people.

Luson Thomas's seventh son George Holt Thomas was a director of the newspaper company and became general manager. Holt Thomas founded The Bystander and later Empire Illustrated before abandoning newspapers in 1906 and making a greater name for himself in the aviation industry.

=== Demise ===
The Graphic continued to be published weekly under that title until 23 April 1932; it was renamed The National Graphic between 28 April and 14 July 1932. On 15 August 1932, Time magazine reported the name change to The National Graphic and that editor William Comyns Beaumont of The Bystander had taken over, replacing Alan John Bott. It ceased publication in August 1932 after 3,266 issues.

== Innovations ==
The Graphic was designed to compete with the Illustrated London News (established in 1842), and became its most successful rival. Earlier rivals such as the Illustrated Times and the Pictorial Times had either failed to compete or been merged with the ILN. It appealed to the same middle-class readership, but The Graphic, as its name suggests, was intended to use images in a more vivid and striking way than the rather staid ILN. To this end it employed some of the most important artists of the day, making an immediate splash in 1869 with Houseless and Hungry, Luke Fildes' dramatic image of the shivering London poor seeking shelter in a workhouse.

It is much more difficult to produce and print illustrations than type. Improvements in process work and machinery at the end of the 1880s allowed Thomas to realize a project, a daily illustrated paper.

== The Daily Graphic ==
On 4 January 1890, Thomas' company, H. R. Baines & Co., started publication of the first daily illustrated newspaper in England, which was called The Daily Graphic. (Note: This newspaper is not to be confused with its American precursor of the same name, published between 1873 and 1889, which was the first American daily illustrated newspaper.)

Halftone production technology was not sufficiently advanced to allow the reproduction of photographs in large quantities, so simple line illustrations, re-drawn from photographic originals, were generally used in early editions of the newspaper.

In 1898 the owners of The Daily Graphic collaborated with York & Son, a major publisher of lantern slide lectures, to produce "All about a London daily from the paper mill to the breakfast table". The lantern slides provide a fascinating view of how a large circulation Fleet Street newspaper was produced in the 1890s.

In 1926 The Daily Graphic was acquired by William and Gomer Berry (later Viscount Camrose and Viscount Kemsley) of Allied Newspapers. It was published until 16 October 1926, when it was incorporated with the Allied Newspapers' own Daily Sketch. Twenty years later, the Daily Sketch was renamed the Daily Graphic for a period but the name disappeared for the second and final time when the Sketch was sold to Associated Newspapers at the end of 1952.

== Contributors ==
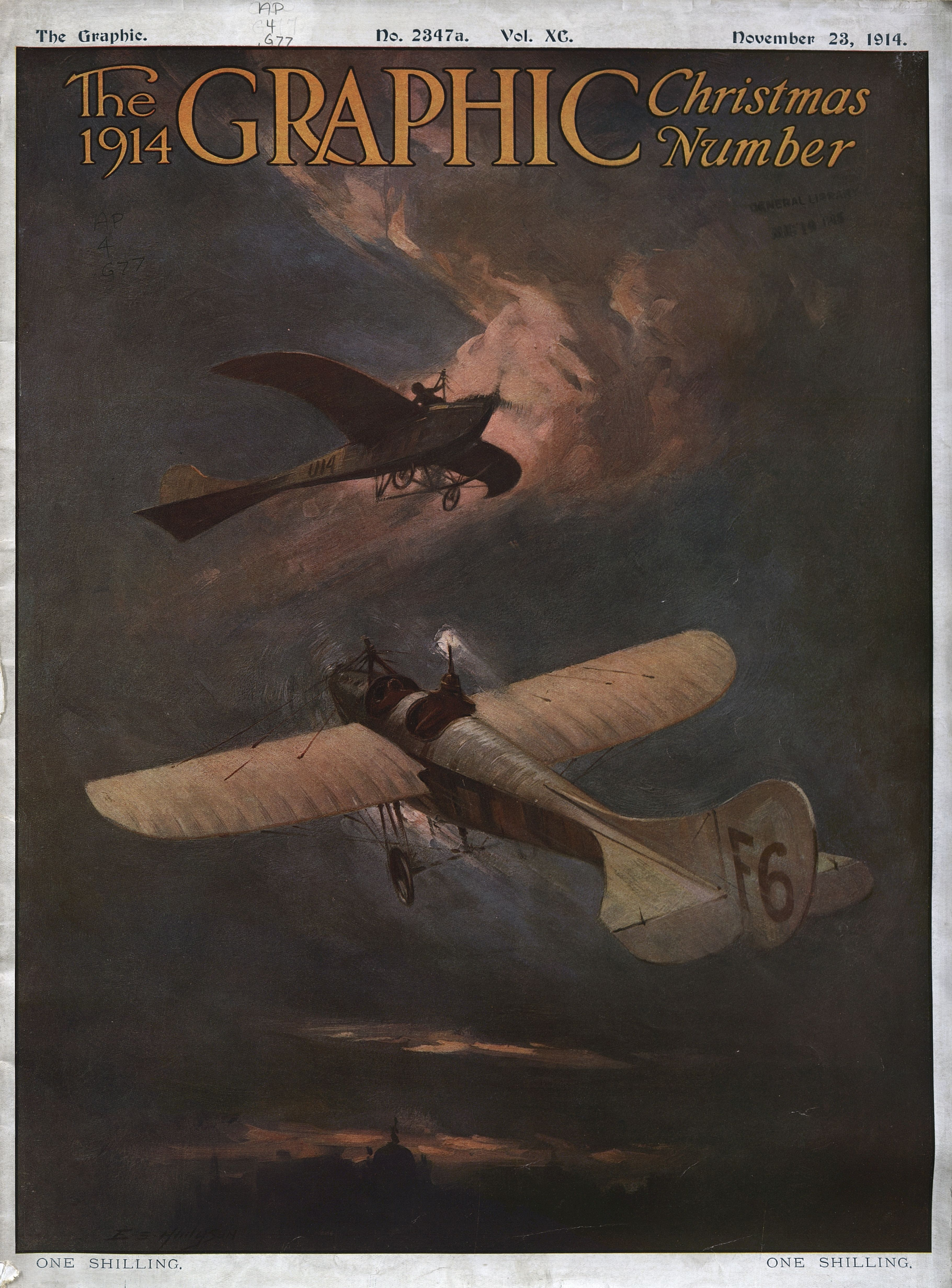
Cover of the 1914 Christmas Number

=== Artists ===
Artists employed on The Graphic and The Daily Graphic at the end of the nineteenth century and beginning of the twentieth century included Helen Allingham, Edmund Blampied, Alexander Boyd, Frank Brangwyn, Randolph Caldecott, Lance Calkin, Frank Cadogan Cowper, Léon Daviel, John Charles Dollman, James H. Dowd, Godefroy Durand, Luke Fildes, Harry Furniss, John Percival Gülich, George du Maurier, Phil May, George Percy Jacomb-Hood, Ernest Prater, Leonard Raven-Hill, Sidney Sime, Snaffles (Charles Johnson Payne), George Stampa, Edmund Sullivan, Bert Thomas, F. H. Townsend, Harrison Weir, and Henry Woods.

The notable illustrator Henry William Brewer, contributed a regular illustrated article on architecture to the magazine for 25 years, until his death in 1903.

=== Writers ===
Writers for the paper included George Eliot, Thomas Hardy, H. Rider Haggard and Anthony Trollope. Malcolm Charles Salaman was employed there from 1890 to 1899. Beatrice Grimshaw travelled the South Pacific reporting on her experiences for the Daily Graphic. Mary Frances Billington served the Graphic as a special correspondent from 1890 to 1897, reporting from India in essays that were compiled into Woman in India (1895). Joseph Ashby-Sterry wrote the Bystander column for the paper for 18 years.

== Weekly topics ==
- Topics of the Week: 12 paragraphs of news coverage.
- Amusements: A roundup of activities for the week, for the middle-class reader.
- Our illustrations: a summary of all the illustrations in the edition.
- Home: a summary of the news in Britain.
- Church news
- Legal: Trials and cases of interest to the target reader.
- A weekly serial written by popular authors of the time, such as William Black (although this seemed to appear in the 1880s).
- Book reviews
- A summary of the new developments in science.
- Rural notes: information about the season and tips about crops, and other news concerning the rampant unrest of the farm labourers.
- New Music: Reviews of the latest music and musicals.
- Obituaries: of Church leaders, factory owners, European royalty, musicians and noteworthy Victorians.
- Sport: coverage of football and cricket (with W.G. Grace)
- Motoring: c. 1903–1908 Dorothy Levitt, The Fastest Girl on Earth, wrote a column on motoring from the point of view of 'A woman's right to motor'. A collection of her articles formed the basis of the book The Woman and the Car: A chatty little handbook for all women who motor or who want to motor in 1907/9.

There were at least three pages dedicated to advertising, with many adverts for toothpaste, soap products, and 'miracle-cure' pills.
