= Edith Jagger =

British artist and textile designer

Edith Jagger (1880-1977) was a British artist and textile designer. She specialized in textile design and was Chief Designer at Painted Fabrics Limited in Sheffield for fourteen years. Her oil paintings of still lifes and flower subjects were exhibited internationally throughout the 1930s.

== Early life ==
Edith Jagger was born in Kilnhurst, near Rotherham, then in the West Riding of Yorkshire in 1880, the first child of Enoch and Mary Elizabeth Jagger. She attended St. Thomas’ School, Kilnhurst and was brought up a Methodist. She is the older sister of painter David Jagger and sculptor Charles Sargeant Jagger.

== Early training and career ==
Jagger studied at Sheffield Technical School of Art, alongside her younger brother, sculptor, Charles Sargeant Jagger. In 1907 she submitted a winning entry in the National Art Schools Competition arranged by the South Kensington Museum.

Initially, Jagger wanted to become a painter of horses, however she spent several years painting local landscapes. She became heavily involved with the administration of the Sheffield Society of Artists, becoming an associate member in 1911 and elected a full member in 1931. She was known as an expert needleworker and a consummate colourist, who was highly receptive to current trends within the worlds of art and music.

== Painted Fabrics ==
Jagger is most well known for her contribution as Chief Designer for Painted Fabrics Limited, a position she held for fourteen years. Painted Fabrics Ltd developed from occupational therapy for injured British servicemen at Wharncliffe War Hospital in Sheffield, many of whom had been seriously invalided during the First World War, including severe shell shock and the loss of limbs. Painted Fabrics offered a combination of physical and psychological rehabilitation through the artistic and entrepreneurial talents of a small group of women.

Painted Fabrics was established by four ex-art students, Annie Bindon Carter, Dorothy Bindon Carter, Phyllis Lawton and Jagger. From small charitable beginnings, as part of SASMA (The Disabled Sailors' and Soldiers' Mutual Association) the company went on to produce fabrics and clothing of fashionable design and high quality for several decades. Painted Fabrics became a limited company in 1923, received national press coverage and the continued support and patronage of the British royal family. The companies wares were sold across the country, including Liberty’s and Claridge’s Hotel in London. Samples were also shipped for exhibition in South Africa and Argentina. The company sustained commercial success throughout the 1920s was in no small measure down to Jagger’s striking contemporary designs.

== Exhibiting career ==
Following an artistic dispute, Jagger resigned from Painted Fabrics and concentrated on her painting. Her oil paintings were shown in principle exhibitions in Liverpool, Leeds, Glasgow and London, including the Royal Academy's Summer Exhibition, where her work was shown alongside that of her brothers, Charles Sargeant Jagger and David Jagger. Her paintings were included in several national touring exhibitions and selected for the Paris Salon. She exhibited sixteen paintings with the Sheffield Society of Artists during the 1930s. Twenty-eight of her paintings were included in The Art of Jagger Family, an exhibition which toured to seven towns and cities across the Midlands and North of England during 1939-40.

== Later years ==
She was fiercely independent and never married. Jagger continued to paint into the late 1950s, though seldom exhibited her work. She died in Matlock, Derbyshire, aged ninety-seven in 1977, having outlived both of her brothers.

Jagger's original designs and card stencils produced for Painted Fabrics were included in two recent exhibitions, Printed Painted Fabrics, Weston Park Museum, Sheffield (2014) and Business and Benefaction: the colourful life of Sheffield artist Annie Bindon Carter, Weston Bank Library, The University of Sheffield (2016). Jagger’s life and work is the subject of a forthcoming publication, ‘The Art of the Jagger Family’ by Timothy Dickson (Winter 2017).
