= Anglo-Belgian Memorial, Brussels =

Monument in Brussels, Belgium

Anglo-Belgian Memorial
- Monument aux Soldats Britanniques (French); Monument voor de Britse Soldaat (Dutch)
- Brussels, Belgium
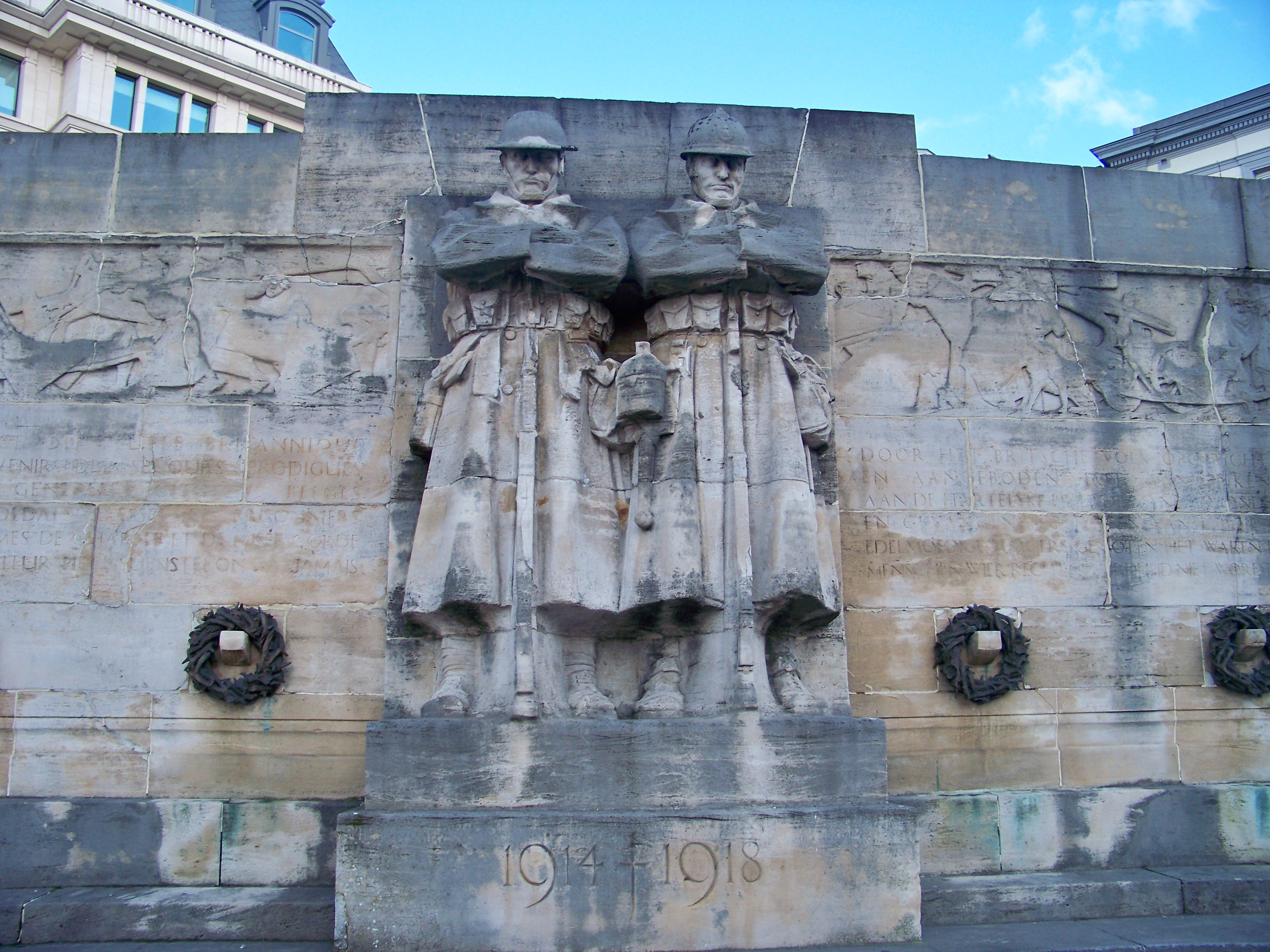
- For the Belgian people who helped British soldiers in World War I
- Unveiled: 1923
- Location: 50.837611°N 4.353501°E; Place Poelaert / Poelaertplein; 1000 City of Brussels, Brussels-Capital Region, Belgium
- Designed by: Charles Sargeant Jagger

The Anglo-Belgian War Memorial (French: Monument aux Soldats Britanniques; Dutch: Monument voor de Britse Soldaat) is a monument in Brussels, Belgium, which was commissioned by the British Imperial War Graves Commission and designed by the British sculptor Charles Sargeant Jagger. Unveiled in 1923 by the Prince of Wales, it commemorates the support given by the Belgian people to British prisoners of war during the First World War. It is located on the Place Poelaert/Poelaertplein near the Palace of Justice and the Belgian Infantry Memorial.

The monument depicts a British and a Belgian soldier carved from Brainvilliers stone. Around the sides are reliefs showing Belgian peasants assisting wounded British soldiers. Casts of the reliefs are held at the Imperial War Museum in London, and a plaster cast of the Belgian soldier is held in the Royal Museum of the Armed Forces in Brussels .

== Other memorials ==
Another Anglo-Belgian War Memorial stands on the Victoria Embankment in London. Completed in 1920, it is the work of the British architect Sir Reginald Blomfield and the Belgian sculptor Victor Rousseau.

== See also ==
- History of Brussels
- Belgium in the long nineteenth century
