= CFE (Belgium) =

Belgian company

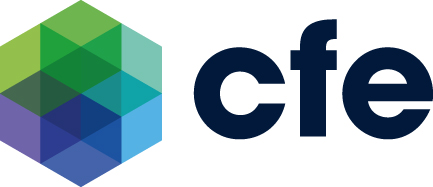
- Company type: S.A.
- Traded as: Euronext Brussels: CFEB
- ISIN: BE0003883031
- Industry: real estate development, construction & renovation, engineering and investments
- Founded: 21 June 1880, as 'Compagnie générale de Chemins de fer secondaires'
- Headquarters: Brussels, Belgium
- Key people: Raymund Trost (CEO)
- Revenue: EURONEXT
- Net income: 38,400,000 euro (2022)
- Number of employees: 3,074 (2022)
- Website: www.cfe.be/en

CFE is a Belgian company with interested in real estate development, construction & renovation, engineering and investments.

The company is listed on Euronext Brussels and is 62.12% owned by Ackermans & van Haaren.

== History ==
In 1880, creation of the Compagnie Générale de Chemins de Fer Secondaires (CFE) dedicated to building and managing of railway and tram lines through concessions.

In 1921, diversification of activities through the involvement in civil engineering and building construction under the name of Compagnie Belge de Chemins de Fer et d'Entreprises.

In 1930, creation of the Société Générale de Dragage active in dredging works both in Belgium and abroad.

In 1965, adoption of the name Compagnie d'Entreprises (CFE), due to the large number of general contractor type activities.

In 1974, CFE and Ackermans & van Haaren pool their dredging activities and create Dredging International.

In 1981, merger of CFE with Entreprises Ed. François et Fils, thereby making CFE the largest Belgian construction company.

In 1989, The GTM Group, shareholder since 1987, becomes the principal shareholder in CFE

In 1991, Creation of the DEME Group (Dredging, Environmental and Marine Engineering) result of the association between Dredging International and Baggerwerken Decloedt. Acquisition of Nizet Entreprise.

In 1999, Acquisition of Vanderhoydoncks Multitechnieken.

In 2000, Vinci SA and GTM merge and become the first worldwide construction group. CFE increases its participation in the DEME Group to 47.8%.

In 2001, CFE introduces an organisation based on three main divisions: the Construction division, which covers all construction professions and the associated services, the Dredging and Environment division, the Electricity division. During the same year, following an agreement with BPC (Bâtiments et Ponts Construction), CFE acquires 100% of ABEB, the Antwerp subsidiary of BPC. The merger of the companies CFE, Bageci, Investissements et Promotion and Maatschappij voor Bouw- en Grondwerken (MBG) takes place in December.

In 2004, Acquisition of Bâtiments et Ponts Construction (BPC) and Bâtipont Immobilier (BPI). CFE increases its participation in the DEME Group to 50%. Creation of a division for Real Estate and associated services, distinct from the Construction division. The Electricity division evolves towards multitechnics.

In 2005, Acquisition of 100% of the shares in Aannemingen Van Wellen.

In 2006, Merger of the Property Management activities of Sogesmaint and CB Richard Ellis. In October, capital increase in cash with a preferential subscription right.

In 2007, CFE realizes an acquisition in the Multitechnics division; CFE has acquired VMA NV Infra-Industry based in Ghent and its subsidiary VMA Slovakia. CFE strengthened by the acquisition of the Brussels-based company Amart, particularly present in the restoration and rehabilitation of buildings. CFE participates for 25% into the company Druart, a company specialized in heating, ventilation, air conditioning and cooling.

In 2008, CFE increases her participation into the company Druart from 25% to 62.5%. CFE reinforces its Multitechnics division through the acquisition of the company Stevens NV. This company, situated in Halen (Limburg - Belgium), is specialized in electrotechnical installations, rail signals installation, cabling, airport lights and marks equipment and also in the installation of telecommunication networks.

In 2009, Reinforcement of the activities of Druart in Wallonia by the integration of Prodfroid, a company with complementary activities. Acquisition of 64,95% of the shares in Van De Maele Multi-techniek based in Meulebeke (Belgium). Elektro Van De Maele is a contractor active in the field of industrial, public and other electrical installations, the electrical part of airconditioning and in the installation, optimisation and automation of stables in the agricultural industry.

In 2010, CFE acquires majority shareholding in Terryn, Belgian market leader in bonded laminates. Creation of "be.maintenance". CFE acquires 65% of shares of Brantegem NV. This company is specialized in HVAC (heating, ventilation, air conditioning) and sanitary equipment.

In 2011, CFE expands its field of activity of its multitechnics division by the acquisition of ETEC and gets a foothold in the field of public lighting. It further reinforces its activity of underground networks. CFE is making an asset deal with the company Leloup Entreprise Générale, which is active in both renovation and transformation of small and medium size projects in Brussels, Flemish Brabant, and Walloon Brabant.

In 2022, the separation from DEME. The CFE Group now focuses on 4 areas: construction & renovation, multitechnics, real estate and investments.
