= J. H. Dowd =

James Henry Dowd (1884 – 16 March 1956) was a British artist—draughtsman, etcher, illustrator, and painter—best known for his work in periodicals, books, and poster design.

== Life ==
Born in Sheffield in 1884, Dowd studied locally at the Sheffield School of Art. At the age of 15, he began his working life as a draughtsman for the Sheffield Telegraph.

Dowd’s early career included work as an illustrator and cartoonist for The Daily Graphic. He made his first contribution to Punch magazine in 1906, later becoming its principal illustrator of film criticism—a role he maintained for over three decades—and also producing theatre caricatures. He contributed to other notable illustrated periodicals of the era such as The Bystander and The Strand Magazine.

In addition to his editorial work, Dowd designed posters for public transport services including the London General Omnibus Company and the London Underground Electric Railways.

Dowd was also an accomplished printmaker—working in etching, drypoint, and watercolor—and exhibited in London and other venues. His artwork includes vivid studies of children, beach scenes, and miscellaneous portraits. Institutions such as the British Museum, Imperial War Museum, Victoria & Albert Museum, and the Art Institute of Chicago hold examples of his work.

He provided illustrations for several books, including Important People (1930/1933) and People of Importance (1934). Another publication featuring his illustrations was Serious Business (1937).

He died in Epsom on 16 March 1956.
