= Anne Carter =

Anne Carter may refer to:

- Anne Hill Carter Lee (1773–1829), First Lady of Virginia
- Anne Laurel Carter (born 1953), Canadian author
- Anne Carter (economist) (born 1925), American academic and economist

== See also ==
- Ann Carter, child actress
- Ann Shaw Carter, American helicopter pilot
- Annie Carter (disambiguation)
