= Annie Bindon Carter =

British entrepreneur and philanthropist

Annie Bindon Carter MBE (1883–1969) was a British entrepreneur, businesswoman and philanthropist.

== Early life ==
Annie Bindon Carter was born in Nottingham, England in 1883 and educated at Ladies’ Moravian School in Oakbrook, Derby. She excelled at art and design and won a scholarship to study at Sheffield Technical School of Art.

Annie, together with three other ex-art school students, her sister Dorothy Bindon Carter, Phyllis Lawton and Edith Jagger, all volunteered at Wharncliffe War Hospital, Sheffield during 1915/16. They assisted in the rehabilitation of servicemen returning injured from the Great War through informal art classes. The four women went on to found Painted Fabrics in 1917, with the aim of 'establishing a charitable organisation which would actively rehabilitate severely injured ex-servicemen through occupational therapy'.

== Painted Fabrics ==
The result was Painted Fabrics, a charitable organisation designed to enable severely disabled soldiers and sailors, which included double amputees and those suffering from shell shock to work and to have a roof over their and their families' heads. A policy which adhered to the company's motto 'Work not Charity'.

Annie, was the wife of the successful Sheffield industrialist, Geoffrey Carter, who was himself, a serving officer abroad. From the outset, Annie was instrumental in making sure Painted Fabrics became a limited company in 1923. The company then acquired the lease to a former army camp at Meadowhead, Norton, on the south-west edge of Sheffield. The wooden huts became print and design workshops and accommodation was supplied to the men and their families.

The ex-servicemen hand-printed designs onto various fabrics, using a wide variety of printing techniques. These fabrics were then made up into a myriad of ‘Painted Fabrics products’, which included dresses, tablecloths and curtains. Annie, affectionately known as ABC by the employees of Painted Fabrics, dealt with the day-to-day running of the company. She acted as the conduit between the men, the press and the companies illustrious board. Under her administration as Honorary Secretary and one of five directors, the company was conferred with several Royal Warrants. She was awarded an MBE in 1926, in recognition of her work ‘for disabled soldiers and sailors’.

The Sheffield Daily Telegraph, in August 1930, wrote about Annie in the ‘Who’s Who in Sheffield’; It is difficult to write of Mrs. Carter without giving the history of Painted Fabrics, as she has been so closely associated with it. The greatness of the work has often over-shadowed the personality of its originator, who is one of the simplest and happiest of people. An instance of the fine effect that living for others has upon one’s own outlook.

By the early 1930s, Painted Fabrics Limited employed 36 ex-servicemen and also supported their immediate families. The administration of Painted Fabrics took up most of her time. Despite national press coverage, exhibitions and displays across the country, sales fluctuated and the company faced continual financial hardship. The company effectively ceased in 1939, when the companies site at Norton was requisitioned by the War Office. Painted Fabrics was re-established after World War Two finished, though not to the same extent as its earlier incarnation. It continued through until it was officially closed in 1959.

== Later years ==
She was awarded an honorary M.A. by the University of Sheffield in 1959. After a visit to the newly built main university library in 1961 (renamed Western Bank Library), she presented the librarian with a cheque for £1,000. These funds were used to purchase ‘outstanding examples of modern book production by private presses’.

Annie died in 1969. A blue plaque was unveiled in 2000, at the former site of Painted Fabrics, the plaque described Annie Bindon Carter as a ‘humanitarian’. An exhibition featuring work produced by Painted Fabrics entitled ‘Business and Benefaction: the colourful life of Sheffield artist Annie Bindon Carter’, was held at Weston Bank Library, The University of Sheffield in 2016.
