= Edouard Vereycken =

Edouard Vereycken (1893–1965), also known as Edward Vereycken, was a Belgian sculptor whose work was influenced by Auguste Rodin and Jef Lambeaux. He was born in Antwerp, studied at the Royal Academy of Fine Arts (Antwerp), and worked in Italy, America, Canada, and France. In 1920 Vereycken won the Prix de Rome for his Perseus.
