= Charles Sargeant Jagger =

English sculptor (1885–1934)

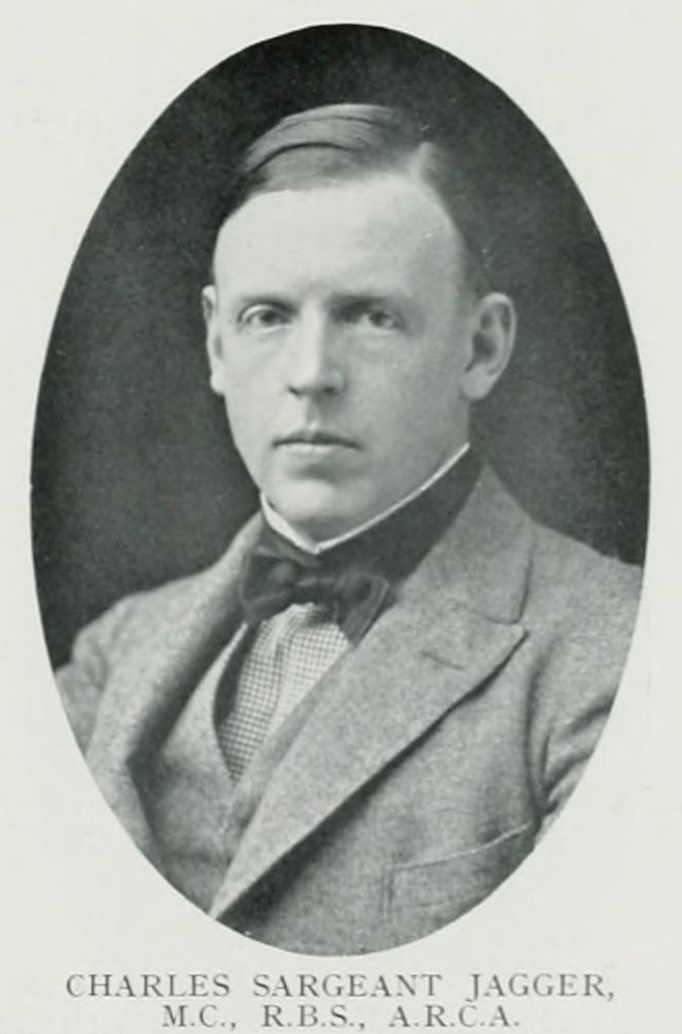
- Charles Sargeant Jagger, photographed in about 1922
- Born: Charles Sargeant Jagger; 17 December 1885; Kilnhurst, Rotherham, Yorkshire, England
- Died: 16 November 1934 (aged 48); London, England
- Education: Sheffield School of Art, Royal College of Art
- Known for: sculpture, relief
- Notable work: Royal Artillery Memorial, London; Henry Mond, 2nd Baron Melchett
- Awards: British Prix de Rome, Military Cross
- Patrons: Imperial War Graves Commission (now Commonwealth War Graves Commission)

Charles Sargeant Jagger MC ARA (17 December 1885 – 16 November 1934) was a British sculptor who, following active service in the First World War, sculpted many works on the theme of war. He is best known for his war memorials, especially the Royal Artillery Memorial at Hyde Park Corner and the Great Western Railway War Memorial in Paddington Railway Station. He also designed several other monuments around Britain and other parts of the world.

== Biography ==
Charles Sargeant Jagger was the son of a colliery manager, and was educated at Sheffield Royal Grammar School. At age 14 he became an apprentice metal engraver with the Sheffield firm Mappin & Webb.

He studied at the Sheffield School of Art before moving to London to study sculpture at the Royal College of Art (1908–11) under Édouard Lantéri. Jagger worked as Lanteri's assistant, and also as instructor in modelling at the Lambeth School of Art. He counted among his friends William Reid Dick and William McMillan. Jagger's early works dealt with classical and literary themes and were influenced by the New Sculpture movement in the focus on medievalism and on surface qualities. His student work won him a travelling scholarship that made it possible for him to spend several months in Rome and Venice. In 1914 he won the British Prix de Rome.

Both his elder sister, Edith, and his younger brother, David, were painters.

== Military service ==
When war broke out in 1914, Jagger gave up his Rome scholarship to join the army. At first, Jagger joined the Artists' Rifles, and in 1915 he was commissioned in the Worcestershire Regiment. Jagger served in Gallipoli and on the Western Front, and was wounded three times. He was awarded the Military Cross for gallantry.

== Work as a sculptor ==
Jagger's style tended towards realism, especially his portrayal of soldiers. The fashion at the time was for idealism and modernism in sculpture, but Jagger's figures were rugged and workman-like, earning him a reputation for 'realist' sculpture. Although Jagger was commissioned as a sculptor of a variety of monuments, it is for his war memorials that he is chiefly remembered.

Whilst convalescing from war wounds in 1919, he began work on No Man's Land, a low relief which is today part of the Tate Collection. It depicts a "listening post", a technique of trench warfare in which a soldier would hide among the corpses, broken stretchers and barbed wire of No Man's Land, in order to listen for the enemy.

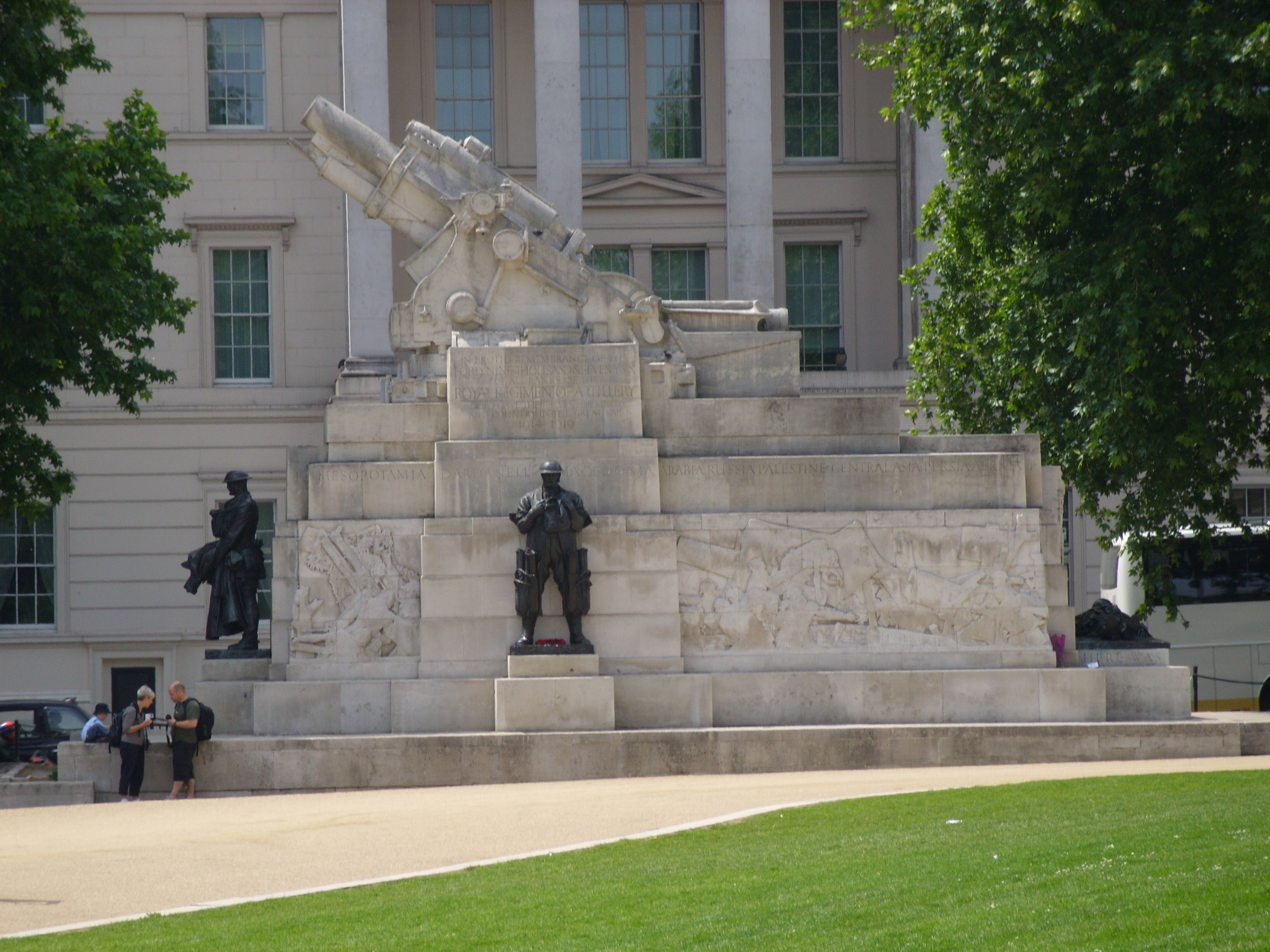
The Royal Artillery Memorial at Hyde Park Corner in London

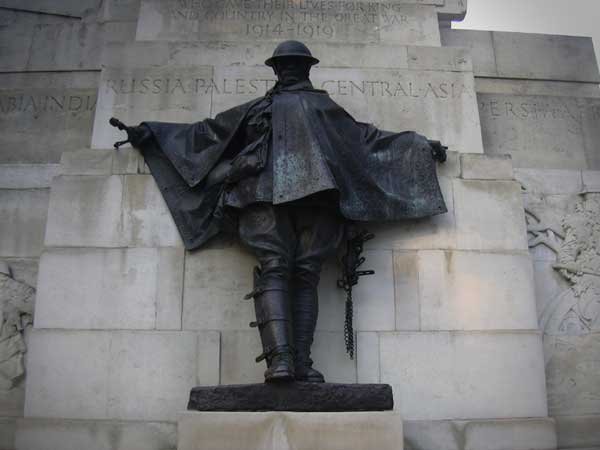
Detail from Jagger's Royal Artillery Memorial

His Royal Artillery Memorial (1921–25) at Hyde Park Corner in London is one of his best-known works. It features a giant sculpture of a howitzer surrounded by four bronze soldiers and stone relief scenes, and is dedicated to casualties in the British Royal Regiment of Artillery in World War I. When Jagger was commissioned to work on the Royal Artillery Memorial, he remarked to the Daily Express the "experience in the trenches persuaded me of the necessity for frankness and truth".

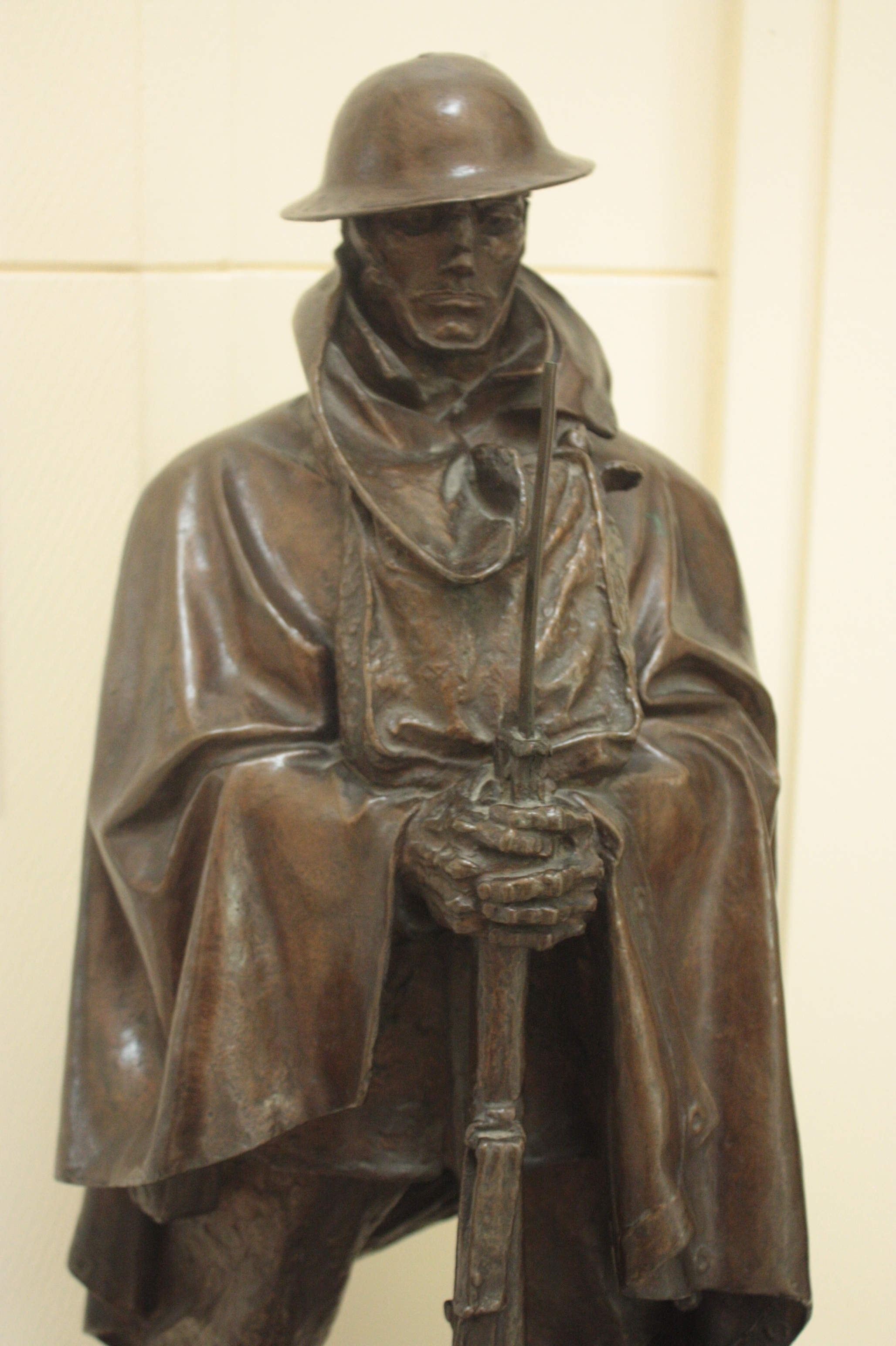
Sentry by Charles Sargeant Jagger

Monumental works of the period used symbolic figures rather than actual depictions of soldiers. Furthermore, during the war years, a government edict had banned images of dead British soldiers. Jagger defied both these conventions by creating realistic bronze figures of three standing soldiers and the body of a dead soldier laid out and shrouded by a greatcoat. The Gunner became the inspiration for a hero in the children's fantasy novel Stoneheart by Charlie Fletcher.

Two memorial figures were recast for the forecourt of the Museum and State Library of Victoria; and subsequently moved to the Shrine of Remembrance where they are known as "The Driver and the Wipers."

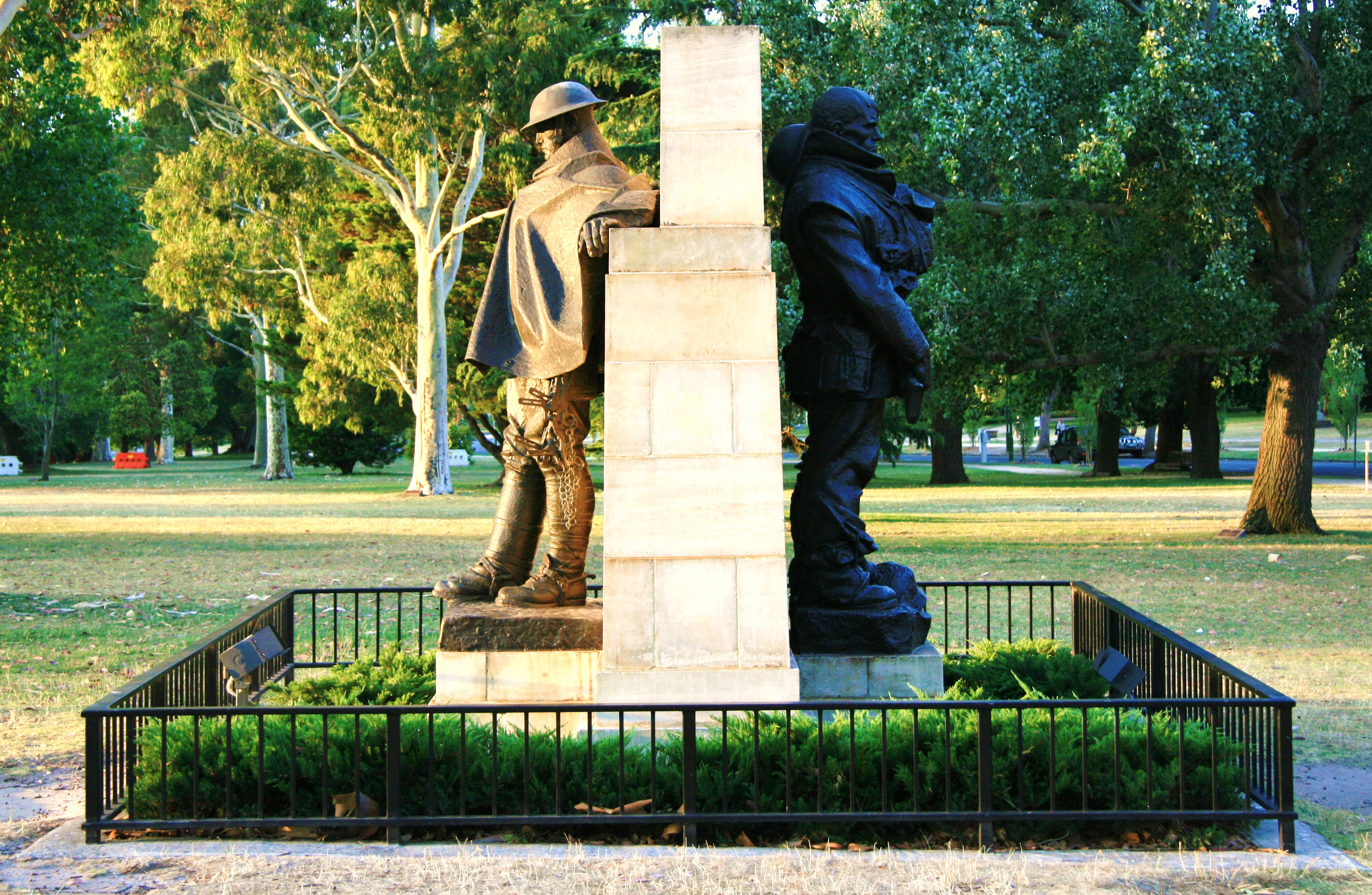
The Driver and Wipers Memorial

Jagger was made an Associate of the Royal Academy in 1926.

After the demand for war memorials had subsided, Jagger continued to receive important commissions and his works were increasingly influenced by Art Deco. Some of his works include allegorical stone figures at Imperial Chemical House, London (1928) and The Kelham Rood (1929).

In 1931 Jagger was commissioned by architect Edwin Lutyens to design a sculpture of Christ the King for the designs for Liverpool Metropolitan Cathedral. The sculpture was never executed because Lutyens' design was extremely costly and funding for the building work ran out. A model of Lutyens' unrealised building is displayed in the Walker Art Gallery. Jagger was also commissioned to provide sculptures of elephants and imperial lions for Lutyens' government buildings in New Delhi, India.

Jagger produced many smaller works, such as busts, statuettes, reliefs, and exhibited them at the Royal Academy in 1913–34, his work continued to be exhibited posthumously, including at the Glasgow Empire Exhibition in 1938.

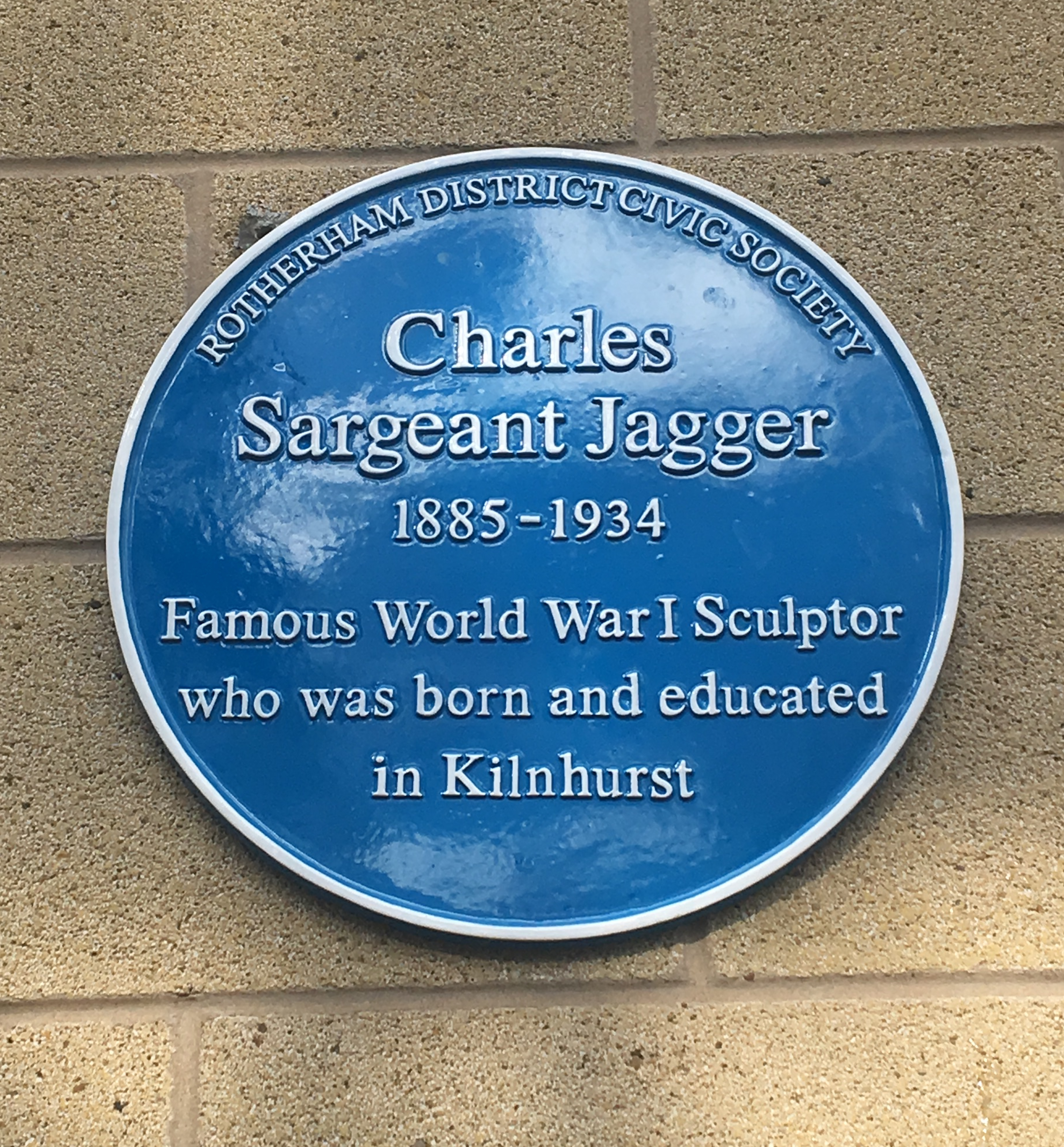
Charles Sargeant Jagger blue plaque in his home village of Kilnhurst, South Yorkshire (2018)

Jagger died suddenly from pneumonia on 16 November 1934. He was in the process of finishing a statue of George V for New Delhi at his death, and work on it was completed by William Reid Dick. A documentary about Jagger's work and featuring this statue of George V was in the process of being filmed by Pathe. This was edited into a short two-minute filmic obituary which was released under the title An Unfinished Symphony in Stone.

A touring memorial exhibition was organised by two of his chief patrons in 1935–36 (Freda, Lady Forres and Henry Mond, 2nd Baron Melchett). Two years later a second touring exhibition was arranged called Art of the Jagger Family, which featured sculptures by Charles Sargeant Jagger together with portraits by his brother, David (also highly successful), and landscapes and flower subjects by his sister, Edith. Thereafter his reputation declined until 1985–86 when a large retrospective exhibition entitled War and Peace Sculpture was held at the Imperial War Museum, with the Mappin Art Gallery, Sheffield.

A blue plaque was unveiled in his home village, Kilnhurst by the Rotherham District Civic Society in October 2018. A similar plaque was unveiled in 2000 at his London home, 67 Albert Bridge Road, Battersea.

== Selected works ==
Jagger's major commissions include the following:

London, United Kingdom
Work	Date	Image	Description	Location	Notes
No Man's Land	1919–20	No Man's Land	Bronze relief of a soldier hiding among the dead bodies, broken stretchers and barbed wire of No Man's Land at 'listening post'.	Victoria & Albert Museum	Original plaster had a verse: "O, little mighty band that stood for England That with our bodies for a living shield Guarded her slow awakening" (removed in the bronze). On loan from the Tate Collection
Great Western Railway War Memorial	1922	GWR memorial	Bronze statue of a soldier reading a letter from home	Platform 1, Paddington Station	To commemorate the founding of the Army Post Office Corps in 1882, its successor the Royal Engineers (Postal & Courier Services), commissioned Jill Tweed and Mike Smith to sculpt a life-size statue of Jagger's Great Western Railway War Memorial. The statue entitled Letter from Home was unveiled at Inglis Barracks, Mill Hill, London on 16 July 1982 by Queen Elizabeth II. In 2007 the statue was moved to RAF Northolt.
Royal Artillery Memorial	1925	Royal Artillery Memorial Driver Gunner Captain Fallen soldier	Four bronze figures on Portland stone plinth	Hyde Park Corner	
Ernest Henry Shackleton	1927–32	Shackleton Statue	Bronze figure mounted in wall alcove	Royal Geographical Society	The Ernest H. Shackleton Monument (The Victorian Web)
The Builder, Marine Transport, Agriculture and Chemistry	1928	Marine Transport Agriculture Chemistry The Builder	Portland stone figure groups on 5th floor balustrade	Imperial Chemical House, Millbank	
St. George and Britannia	1928	St George Britannia	Portland stone figures on entrance gate	Thames House, Millbank	
The Kelham Rood	1929	The Kelham Rood	Bronze Crucifixion triptych group of Christ, Mary and Mary Magdalen	St John the Divine, Kennington	Originally sculpted for the chapel at Kelham Hall, Nottinghamshire
The Scandal Relief	1930		Bronze Art Deco relief of embracing figures with accompanying fire basket	Victoria & Albert Museum	Private commission from Henry Mond, 2nd Baron Melchett for the interior of Mulberry House, Smith Square, Westminster purchased by the museum for £106,000
United Kingdom outside London
Work	Date	Image	Description	Location	Notes
Torfrida	c.1911	Torfrida	Praying female figure	Clifton Park Museum, Rotherham	Torfrida (The Victorian Web)
Guildhall Square Cenotaph	1921	Vickers machine gun Lewis machine gun	Two stone statues of machine gunners (Vickers and Lewis guns)	Guildhall Square, Portsmouth	
Sculpture of a Sentry	1921	the Sentry	Bronze soldier wearing greatcoat and helmet, holding a bayonet	Watts Warehouse (now the Britannia Hotel), Manchester	A maquette of the Manchester Sentry can also be seen at the Walker Art Gallery, Liverpool
Bedford War Memorial	1921	Statue on Bedford War Memorial	Stone figure of the Anglo Saxon Lady Athelflaed, ruler of Mercia, vanquishing a dragon	Bedford	The monument stands on the Embankment opposite Rothsay Gardens
Hoylake and West Kirby War Memorial	1922	Hooded woman Infantry soldier	Two 3m bronze figures against an 11.5m granite obelisk - hooded woman and infantry soldier holding a bayonet rifle	Grange Hill, Hoylake, Merseyside	The soldier's bayonet has been removed due to previous vandalism, but is reinstated annually for the Armistice Day Memorial Service.
Brimington War Memorial	1921	Brimington War Memorial	Marble Britannia figure, winged helmet, sword and shield; shield decorated with lion, scales and wreath	Church of St Michael and All Angels, Brimington, Derbyshire	The figure originally stood on a plinth which was later stolen
Monument to Charles Pelham, Lord Worsley	1914	Charles Pelham memorial	Marble relief of Lord Worsley kneeling at prayer	All Saints Church, Brocklesby, Lincolnshire	Monument is in the 17th century style to complement the adjacent Pelham family tomb of 1629
Christ the King	1931		Maquette for Lutyens' model of his proposal for Liverpool Metropolitan Cathedral	Liverpool	Commissioned by Sir Edwin Lutyens and intended for the top of the west front; not executed, but several posthumous metal casts exist. Lutyens' model is at the Walker Art Gallery, Liverpool
Worldwide
Work	Date	Image	Description	Location	Notes
Anglo-Belgian Memorial	1923	Anglo-Belgian Memorial	Sculptures of a British and Belgian soldier side by side with reliefs either side	Brussels, Belgium	Casts of the reliefs are held at the Imperial War Museum, London
Nieuport Memorial	1928	Stone lion from front Stone lion side-on, facing right Stone lion side-on, facing left	Three stone lions standing guard around a cenotaph	Nieuwpoort, Belgium	Memorial commemorates 566 soldiers from the Antwerp Expedition of October 1914 and subsequent battles in the area in July 1917.
Cambrai Memorial	1928	Trench periscope Stretcher bearers	Two stone reliefs depicting soldiers fighting and carrying the wounded in the trenches	Louverval Military Cemetery, Cambrai, France	Memorial commemorates over 7000 servicemen of the United Kingdom and South Africa who died in the Battle of Cambrai in November and December 1917
Port Tewfik Memorial	1926	Port Tewfik Memorial in 1932	Two crouching tiger sculptures guarded the memorial	Originally at Port Tewfik (or Port Taufiq), Suez Canal, Egypt	Jagger's work was destroyed in the Israeli-Egyptian fighting (date uncertain); the memorial was relocated to the Heliopolis War Cemetery.
Shrine of Remembrance	1927–34	Detail of Drivers memorial Driver and Wipers memorial, side-on Wipers memorial	Two bronze soldiers - Driver holding a horse bridle, and British infantry soldier standing guard with rifle and bayonet.	Melbourne, Australia	The "Wipers" figure is a re-casting of the soldier from the Hoylake and West Kirby memorial, and the "Driver" is a re-casting from the Royal Artillery Memorial in London.
Viceroy's House and the Jaipur Column	1929	Elephant statues on walls of Rashtrapati Bhavan Jaipur Column bas-relief	Mughal-style Elephants in the outer walls; bas-reliefs on the Jaipur Column	New Delhi, India	Commissioned by Sir Edwin Lutyens
Lord Reading statue	1920s	Lord Reading statue	Statue of Lord Reading, Viceroy of India (1921-1926).	Reading, England	One of the statues commissioned from Jagger by Lutyens for New Delhi, later moved to Eldon Square gardens in Reading in 1971.
Lord Hardinge statue	1928	Lord Hardinge statue	Statue of Lord Hardinge of Penshurst, Viceroy of India (1910-1916).	New Delhi, India	One of the statues commissioned from Jagger by Lutyens for New Delhi, later moved to Coronation Park.
George V statue	1936		Large statue of King George V wearing his robes for the Delhi Durbar of 1911	New Delhi, India	Unfinished at the time of Jagger's death in 1934, this statue was completed by William Reid Dick and was originally erected in 1936 under a Lutyens-designed canopy at the India Gate arch. It was moved in 1968 to Coronation Park.
