= Geoffrey Hope-Morley, 2nd Baron Hollenden =

The Right Honourable The Lord Hollenden JP

High Sheriff of the County of London
- In office 1917–1918
- Preceded by: Henry Alexander Trotter
- Succeeded by: Frederick Huth Jackson

Personal details
- Born: Geoffrey Morley; 28 January 1885
- Died: 19 October 1977 (aged 92)
- Spouses: Hon. Mary Sidney Katharine Almina Gardner (m. 1914; div. 1928) Muriel Ivy Gladstone (m. 1929; died 1962) Violet Leverton Howitt (m. 1963)
- Children: 2
- Parent(s): Samuel Hope Morley, 1st Baron Hollenden; Laura Marianne Birch
- Relatives: Samuel Morley (grandfather); Arnold Morley (uncle)
- Education: Eton College
- Alma mater: Trinity College, Cambridge

Geoffrey Hope-Morley, 2nd Baron Hollenden (28 January 1885 – 19 October 1977), was a British aristocrat who served as High Sheriff of the County of London.

== Early life ==
He was the son of Samuel Hope Morley and Laura Marianne (née Birch) Morley. His father, a banker and Governor of the Bank of England, was raised to the peerage as Baron Hollenden, of Leigh in the County of Kent, on 9 February 1912. His paternal grandparents were Samuel Morley, a member of parliament, and Rebekah Maria Hope, and his uncle was Liberal politician Arnold Morley. His maternal grandfather was the Rev. G. Royds Birch. His younger brother, Hon. Claude Hope-Morley, was married to Lady Dorothy Mercer-Henderson, daughter of the 7th Earl of Buckinghamshire.

He was educated at Eton College in Windsor before attending Trinity College, Cambridge in Cambridgeshire.

== Career ==
In 1917, while living at 7 Connaught Place, London, he succeeded Henry Alexander Trotter to become the High Sheriff of the County of London (a position his father held from 1893 to 1894). Morley was succeeded by The Rt. Hon. Frederick Huth Jackson.

On 18 February 1929, he succeeded to the barony upon his father's death and on 24 October 1923, he had his name legally changed to Geoffrey Hope-Morley by deed poll.

In 1927, he was a Justice of the Peace and in 1929, he was serving as the president of the Wholesale Textile Association.

== Personal life ==
Lord Hollenden was married three times. His first marriage was on 12 December 1914 to the Hon. Mary Sidney Katharine Almina Gardner (1896–1994), the third daughter of Herbert Gardner, 1st Baron Burghclere and Lady Winifred (herself the daughter of Henry Herbert, 4th Earl of Carnarvon). Before their divorce in 1928, they were the parents of two daughters:

- Hon. Mary Joan Fenella Hope-Morley (1915–2015), who married David Babington Smith, son of Sir Henry Babington Smith and Lady Elisabeth Mary Bruce (daughter of the 9th Earl of Elgin) in 1941.
- Hon. Elspeth Rachel Marianne Winifred Hope Hope-Morley (1917–1989), who married diplomat Sir David Francis Muirhead in 1942.

On 6 May 1929, he married for the second time to Muriel Ivy Gladstone, daughter of Sir John Gladstone, 4th Baronet and niece of the late William Ewart Gladstone, the former Prime Minister of the United Kingdom. Her mother, Gertrude (née Miller) Gladstone, was the first daughter of Sir Charles Miller, 7th Baronet. Baroness Hollenden died on 6 June 1962.

His third and final marriage was on 7 January 1963 to Violet Norris (née Leverton) Howitt, the daughter of Alfred Leverton and widow of Frank Dutch Howitt.

Baron Hollenden died at age 92 on 19 October 1977. As he died without direct male issue, he was succeeded in the barony by his nephew, Gordon Hope-Morley, the only son of his younger brother, Hon. Claude Hope-Morley.

== Arms ==
Coat of arms of Geoffrey Hope-Morley, 2nd Baron Hollenden
Crest A demi-gryphon Argent wings elevated Ermine holding between the claws a leopard’s head jessant-de-lys as in the arms. Escutcheon Argent a leopard’s head jessant-de-lys Sable between three gryphons’ heads erased Gules. Supporters On either side a stag Proper chained around the neck and suspended therefrom an anchor Or. Motto Tenax Proposit

Honorary titles
Preceded by Henry Alexander Trotter	High Sheriff of the County of London; 1917–1918	Succeeded by Frederick Huth Jackson
Peerage of the United Kingdom
Preceded by Samuel Hope Morley	Baron Hollenden; 1929–1977	Succeeded by Gordon Hope Hope-Morley
