= Petrie =

Petrie is a surname of Scottish origin which may refer to:

== People ==
- Alexander Petrie (died 1662), Scottish minister
- Alexander Petrie (architect) (c. 1842–1905), Scottish architect
- Alistair Petrie (born 1970), English actor
- Andrew Petrie (1798–1872), Scottish-born builder, architect and first free settler of Brisbane, Australia
- Andrew Lang Petrie (1854–1928), politician, builder and stonemason from Brisbane, Australia
- Anthony Petrie (born 1983), Australian basketball player
- Archibald Petrie (1790–1864), Canadian politician
- Arthur Petrie (died 1787), Scottish bishop
- Bob Petrie (1874–1947), Scottish footballer
- Charles Petrie (disambiguation), several people
- Charlie Petrie (1895–1972), English footballer
- Daniel Petrie (1920–2004), American television and movie director
- Daniel Petrie Jr. (born 1952), American screenwriter, son of Daniel
- Dave Petrie, Scottish politician
- David Petrie (1879–1961), Scottish head of MI5
- Don Petrie (1922–2015), Canadian football player and coach
- Donald Petrie, American film director
- Donald Petrie (botanist) (1846–1925), New Zealand botanist and teacher
- Doug Petrie, American television writer
- Drew Petrie (born 1982), Australian footballer
- Ed Petrie (born 1978), English actor and comedian
- Eric Petrie (1927–2004), New Zealand cricketer
- Flinders Petrie (1853–1942), English Egyptologist
- Geoff Petrie (born 1948), American basketball player and executive
- George Petrie (disambiguation), several people
- Grace Petrie (born 1987), English folk singer-songwriter
- Hay Petrie (1895–1949), Scottish actor
- Henry W. Petrie (1857–1925), American composer
- John Petrie (1822–1892), Scottish-born architect, builder and first mayor of Brisbane, Australia
- John Petrie (footballer) (c. 1867–?), Scottish footballer
- Jon Petrie (born 1976), Scottish rugby player
- Lester Petrie (1878–1956), American politician
- Maria Petrie (1887–1972), German sculptor
- Matthew Petrie (born 1978), Australian cricketer
- Milton Petrie (1902–1994), American retailer, investor and philanthropist
- Sir Peter Petrie, 5th Baronet (1932–2021), British ambassador
- Rachel Petrie (born 1971), New Zealand field hockey player
- Ray Petri, originally Ray Petrie (1948–89), fashion designer and creator of the fashion house Buffalo
- Richard Petrie (born 1967), New Zealand cricketer
- Robert Methven Petrie (1906–1966), Canadian astronomer
- Robin Petrie, American santouri and hammered dulcimer player
- Rod Petrie (1956–2025), Scottish football executive
- Stewart Petrie (born 1970), Scottish footballer and coach in Australia
- Thomas Petrie (1831–1910), Scottish-born Australian explorer, timber-getter and Aboriginal overseer
- Wendy Petrie, New Zealand television presenter

== Fictional characters ==
- Petrie, a main character in The Land Before Time franchise
- Rob and Laura Petrie, principal characters of the American TV show The Dick Van Dyke Show
- Dr. Petrie, a foe of Fu Manchu
- Dr. Petrie, from The Mummy's Hand

== See also ==
- Petri
- Petry
- Henry I. Patrie (1874–1935), New York state senator
- Petree
