= Petrie (disambiguation) =

Petrie is a surname.

Petrie may also refer to:

== Places ==
Antarctica

- Petrie Ice Rises, Alexander Island

Australia

- Petrie, Queensland, a suburb of the Moreton Bay Region, Queensland
  - Petrie Airfield
  - Petrie railway station
  - Division of Petrie, an electoral district in the Australian House of Representatives, in Queensland
- Mount Petrie, a mountain in Brisbane, Queensland
- Petrie Bight, a reach of the Brisbane River and neighbourhood within the Brisbane central business district

Canada

- Petrie Island, Ontario

Space

- Petrie (crater), on the Moon
- 21476 Petrie, an asteroid

== Given name ==
- Petrie Meston (1916-1963), Canadian politician
- Uncle Petrie, a fictional character in the American TV series Lassie
- Petrie (Pteranodon), a character in The Land Before Time series

== Other uses ==
- Petrie Museum of Egyptian Archaeology, part of University College London
- Petrie baronets, a title in the Baronetage of the United Kingdom

== See also ==
- Petrie of Rochdale, an English steam engine manufacturer founded in 1792
- Petri dish, a shallow lidded dish used by biologists, sometimes spelled "Petrie"
