= Charles Petrie =

Charles Petrie may refer to:

- Sir Charles Petrie, 1st Baronet (1853–1920), Scottish businessman and Lord Mayor of Liverpool
- Sir Charles Petrie, 3rd Baronet (1895–1977), British historian
- Charles Petrie (diplomat) (born 1959), British United Nations official, Executive Representative for Burundi
- Charles Robert Petrie (1882–1958), New Zealand politician of the Labour Party
- Charlie Petrie (born 1895), English footballer in the 1920s
