= Petri =

Petri is an Italian and Germanic surname derived from the Latin name Petrus. Notable people with the surname include:

- Adam Petri (1454–1527), Swiss Renaissance printer who founded a Basel publishing house
- Alexandra Petri (born 1988), American humor columnist, daughter of Tom
- August Petri (1878–?), German fencer
- Bernhard Eduardovich Petri (1884–1937), Russian anthropologist and archaeologist
- Carl Adam Petri (1926–2010), German mathematician who introduced Petri nets
- Carl Axel Petri (1929–2017), Swedish politician and judge
- Catharose de Petri (1902–1990), Dutch mystic
- Cunerus Petri (1531–1580), Dutch bishop
- Daniele Petri (born 1980), Italian darts player
- Edward P. Petri (1884–1949), American politician and businessman
- Egon Petri (1881–1962), Dutch pianist and composer
- Elio Petri (1929–1982), Italian director, screenwriter and film critic
- Ellen Petri (born 1982), Belgian beauty queen
- Franziska Petri (born 1973), German actress
- Friedrich Richard Petri (1824–1857), American painter of German origin
- György Petri (1943–2000), Hungarian poet
- Heather Petri (born 1978), American water polo player
- Heinrich Petri, better known by his Latin name Henricus Petrus (1508–1579), Swiss publisher
- Hella Petri (1916–1999), Hungarian actress
- Henri Petri (1856–1914), Dutch violinist, music pedagogue, composer and arranger
- Horst and Erna Petri (1913–1962, 1920–2000), married Nazi war criminals
- Ilse Petri (1918–2018), German actress
- Johan Petri (born 1959), Swedish theatre director, dramatist and theatre scholar
- Johannes Petri (printer) (1441–1511), uncle to Adam, both printers of Basel
- Julius Richard Petri (1852–1921), German bacteriologist, inventor of the Petri dish
- Lajos Petri (1884–1963), Hungarian sculptor
- Laurentius Petri (1499–1573), Swedish clergyman, first Evangelical Lutheran Archbishop of Sweden
- Lennart Petri (1914–1996), Swedish diplomat
- Luca Petri (born 1989), Italian football player
- Luigi Petri (1860–1911), Italian painter
- Luis Petri (born 1972), Argentine politician
- Maria Petri (1939–2022), English football supporter
- Mario Petri (1922–1985), Italian operatic bass
- Michala Petri (born 1958), Danish recorder player
- Mike Petri (born 1984), American rugby player
- Nina Petri (born 1963), German actress
- Olaus Petri (1493–1552), Swedish clergyman
- Petrus Petri (1220–1291), Spanish medieval architect
- Ray Petri (1948–1999), Scottish fashion designer
- Romana Petri (born 1955), Italian writer
- Scott Petri (born 1960), American politician from Pennsylvania
- Tom Petri (born 1940), American politician from Wisconsin
- William A. Petri (born 1955), American physician and scientist

== See also ==
- Petrey
- Petrie
- Petrie (disambiguation)
- Petry
