= Petrey =

Petrey may refer to:

- Susan C. Petrey (1945–1980), American writer
- Taylor G. Petrey (born 1976), American scholar and editor
- Petrey, Alabama, United States, a town

== See also ==
- Petree, a surname
- Petri (disambiguation)
- Petrie, a surname
- Petry, a surname
