= Christopher Warner =

Christopher Warner may refer to:

- Christopher Warner (diplomat) (1895–1957), British diplomat and U.K. ambassador to Belgium from 1951 to 1955
- Christopher Warner (bishop) (born 1969), American bishop of the Anglican Diocese of the Mid-Atlantic
