= Petrazzi =

Petrazzi is an Italian surname. Notable people with the surname include:

- Astolfo Petrazzi (1583–1665), Italian painter
- Pedro Sass Petrazzi (born 1990), Brazilian footballer

== See also ==
- Petri
- Petrozzi
