= Embassy of the United Kingdom, Brussels =

UK diplomatic mission

British Embassy, Brussels
- Location: 1040 City of Brussels, Brussels-Capital Region, Belgium
- Address: Avenue d'Auderghem / Oudergemlaan 10
- Coordinates: 50.8418°N 4.3845°E
- Ambassador: Martin Shearman
- Website: British Embassy, Brussels

The Embassy of the United Kingdom in Brussels is the chief diplomatic mission of the United Kingdom in Belgium. The embassy also represents the British Overseas Territories in Belgium.

The embassy is located at 10, avenue d'Auderghem/Oudergemlaan and the building also hosts the UK's Mission to the EU (UKMis). Martin Shearman has been the British Ambassador to Belgium since June 2019.

== History ==
The original British mission was located at the Hôtel de Rodes, on the corner of the Rue de Spa/Spastraat and the Rue de la Loi/Wetstraat, and served as the embassy building until it was evacuated at the outbreak of the Second World War. After the war, the embassy outgrew the building and the Ambassador's residence was moved to the Rue Ducale/Hertogsstraat. The embassy expanded into buildings on the nearby Rue Joseph II/Jozef II-straat. In the 1960s, as the pressure grew on the building, the embassy and mission to the EEC moved to a purposefully built Britannia House. In the 1970s, the UK Mission to the EEC moved out of the Britannia House to 6, Robert Schuman Roundabout. The bilateral embassy, however, resided at Britannia House until the 1990s when it moved to 85, rue d'Arlon/Aarlenstraat.

Nowadays, both the bilateral embassy and the UK Mission to the EU reside at 10, avenue d'Auderghem/Oudergemlaan. The UK also maintains a separate delegation to NATO based in Brussels at NATO's headquarters on the Boulevard Leopold III/Leopold III-laan.

== Ambassador's residence ==
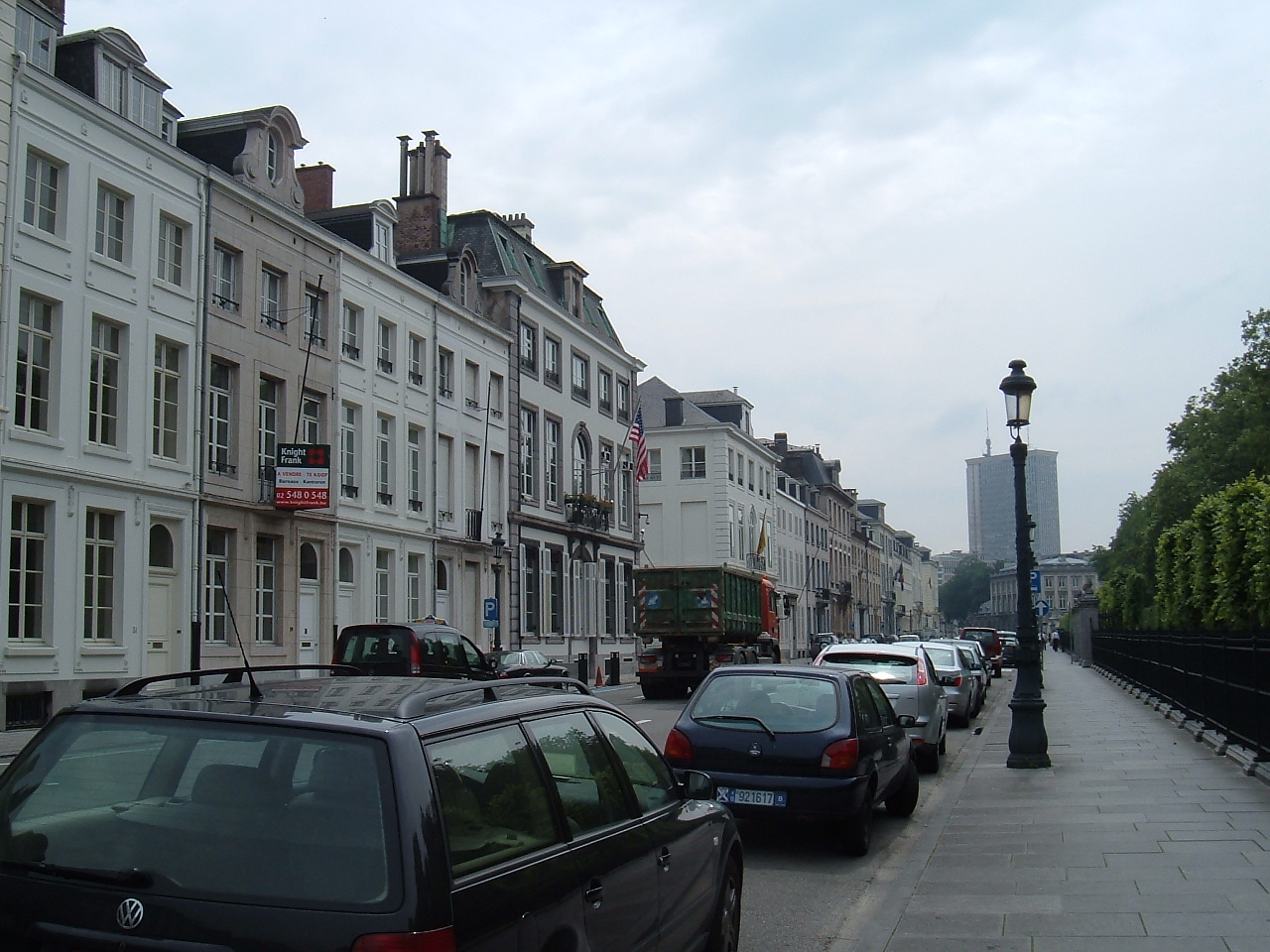
The Rue Ducale/Hertogsstraat, the location of the British Residence

The British Ambassador's official residence, the former Hôtel de Croÿ, is located at 17, rue Ducale/Hertogsstraat. The building was built by architect Louis Sauvage around 1911–1913. It is a large and elegant terraced town house facing Brussels Park. The building was acquired by the British Government after the restoration of the embassy following the end of the Second World War. The owner was Mrs Renée de Becker-Rémy who originally leased the building to the British Ministry of Works and then sold the house and some of its furniture in 1947.

== See also ==
- Belgium–United Kingdom relations
- List of diplomatic missions in Belgium
- List of ambassadors of the United Kingdom to Belgium
