= John Le Rougetel =

British diplomat (1894–1975)

Sir John Le Rougetel KCMG MC

British High Commissioner to South Africa
- In office 1951–1955
- Preceded by: Evelyn Baring
- Succeeded by: Percivale Liesching

British Ambassador to Belgium
- In office 1950–1951
- Preceded by: Sir George Rendel
- Succeeded by: Sir Christopher Warner

British Ambassador to Persia|British Ambassador to Iran|British Ambassador to Persia
- In office 1946–1950
- Preceded by: Sir Reader Bullard
- Succeeded by: Sir Francis Shepherd

Personal details
- Born: 19 July 1894
- Died: 3 January 1975 (aged 80)
- Occupation: Diplomat
- Awards: Military Cross

Military service
- Allegiance: United Kingdom
- Branch/service: British Army
- Years of service: 1915–1920
- Unit: Northamptonshire Regiment
- Battles/wars: First World War

Sir John Helier Le Rougetel KCMG MC (19 June 1894 – 3 January 1975) was a British diplomat.

== Biography ==
Le Rougetel was educated at Rossall School and Magdalene College, Cambridge. He was commissioned into the Northamptonshire Regiment at the start of the First World War, joining its 3rd (Reserve) Battalion. He was awarded the Military Cross and Bar for his actions during the war, in which he served on the Western Front and was attached to the Machine Gun Corps.

Le Rougetel joined the Foreign Office in 1920, and subsequently served in postings in Vienna, Budapest, Ottawa, Tokyo, Pekin, The Hague, Bucharest, Moscow, Shanghai. He was made a Second Secretary in 1923 and a First Secretary in 1930. He was in Shanghai during its occupation by the Japanese and was taken prisoner in 1942, and was later repatriated. He was made a Companion of the Order of St Michael and St George in 1943. From 1944 to 1946 he was Political Representative in Romania, before receiving his first ambassadorial posting to Tehran in 1946. Le Rougetel later served as British Ambassador to Belgium (1950-1) and as a High Commissioner to South Africa (1951-5). He retired in 1955, having been made a Knight Commander of the Order of St Michael and St George.
