= Petrozzi =

Petrozzi is an Italian surname. Notable people with the surname include:

- Astolfo Petrozzi (1583–1653 or 1665), Italian painter
- Clara Petrozzi (born 1965), Peruvian-born violinist, violist, musicologist and composer
- Elvira Petrozzi (1937–2023), Italian Roman Catholic nun
- Francesco Petrozzi (1961–2024), Peruvian lyric tenor and politician
- Luca Petrozzi (born 1995), English born Italian rugby union player
- Morella Petrozzi, one of the judges of the dance reality El Gran Show

== See also ==
- Petri
- Petrazzi
