= Samuel Hope Morley, 1st Baron Hollenden =

British businessman (1845–1929)

The Right Honourable The Lord Hollenden DL JP
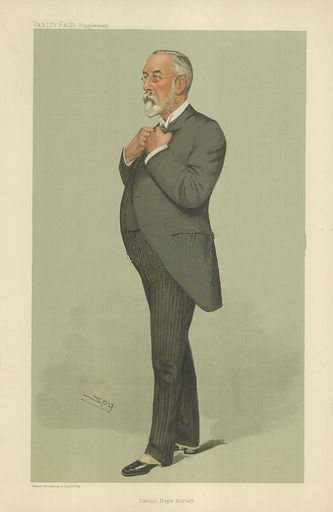
- Vanity Fair caricature by Spy, 17 August 1905.

Governor of the Bank of England
- In office 1903–1905
- Preceded by: Augustus Prevost
- Succeeded by: Alexander Falconer Wallace

High Sheriff of the County of London
- In office 1893–1894
- Preceded by: Bertram Currie
- Succeeded by: Ferdinand Huth

Personal details
- Born: Samuel Hope Morley; 3 July 1845
- Died: 18 February 1929 (aged 83)
- Spouse: Laura Marianne Birch (m. 1884)
- Children: Geoffrey Hope-Morley, 2nd Baron Hollenden; Hon. Claude Hope-Morley
- Parent(s): Samuel Morley; Rebekah Maria Hope
- Relatives: Arnold Morley (brother)
- Education: Trinity College, Cambridge

Samuel Hope Morley, 1st Baron Hollenden DL JP (3 July 1845 – 18 February 1929), was a British businessman.

== Early life ==
Morley was the son of Samuel Morley and Rebekah Maria Hope, daughter of Samuel Hope of Liverpool. The Liberal politician Arnold Morley was his younger brother.

His maternal grandfather Samuel Hope was the son of merchant William Hope, (namesake) of Hope Street, Liverpool. His paternal grandparents were Sarah (née Poulton) and John Morley, a hosiery manufacturer.

He was educated at Trinity College, Cambridge, graduating BA in 1869 (MA in 1872).

== Career ==
He was a partner in the firm of I. and R. Morley, Wood Street; and served as Governor of the Bank of England from 1893 to 1895. He lived in Grosvenor Square. On 9 February 1912, he was raised to the peerage as Baron Hollenden, of Leigh in the County of Kent.

He held the office of Justice of the Peace and Deputy Lieutenant of Kent and, later Justice of the Peace for the County of London.

== Personal life ==
On 6 March 1884, Morley married Laura Marianne Birch (d. 1945), a daughter of Reverend G. Royds Birch. Together, they were the parents of two sons:

- Geoffrey Hope-Morley, 2nd Baron Hollenden (1885–1977), who married three times.
- Hon. Claude Hope-Morley (1887–1968), who married Lady Dorothy Mercer-Henderson, a daughter of the 7th Earl of Buckinghamshire, in 1911.

He died in February 1929, aged 83, and was succeeded in the barony by his son Geoffrey. Lady Hollenden died in 1945. As the second baron had no male heirs, the subsequent barons were all descended from Lord Hollenden's second son Claude.

== Arms ==
Coat of arms of Samuel Hope Morley, 1st Baron Hollenden
Crest A demigriffin argent, wings elevated ermine, holding between the claws a leopard's face jessant de lis as in the arms. Escutcheon Argent, a leopard's face jessantde lis sable between three griffins' heads erased gules. Supporters On either side a stag proper, chained around the neck and suspended therefrom an anchor or. Motto Latin: (Tenax Proposit), Tenacious of purpose.

Government offices
Preceded by Augustus Prevost	Governor of the Bank of England; 1903–1905	Succeeded by Alexander Falconer Wallace
Honorary titles
Preceded by Bertram Currie	High Sheriff of the County of London; 1893–1894	Succeeded by Ferdinand Huth
Peerage of the United Kingdom
New creation	Baron Hollenden; 1912–1929	Succeeded by Geoffrey Hope-Morley
