= Edward Jackson (diplomat) =

British diplomat (1925–2002)

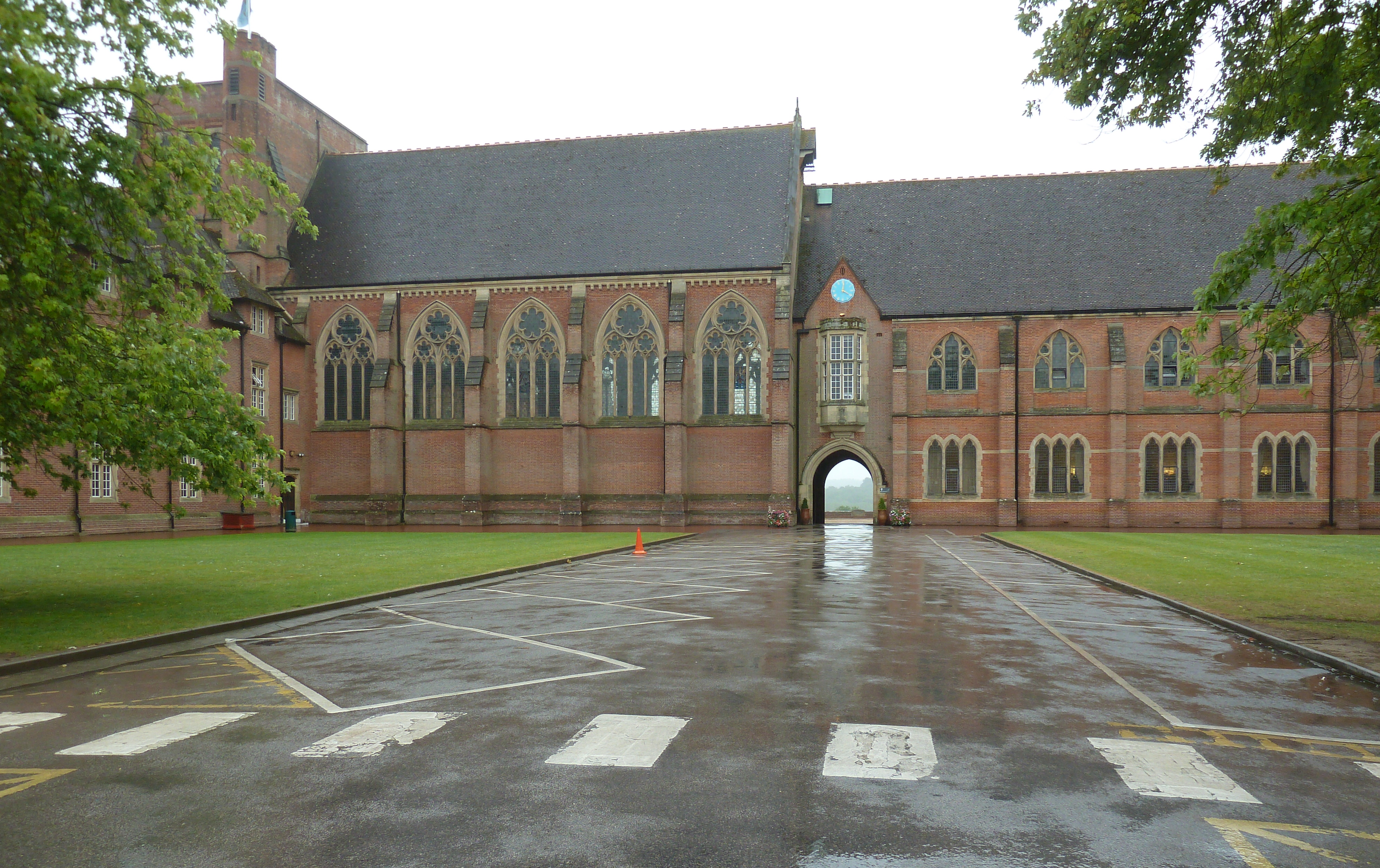
Ardingly College

Sir John Edward Jackson KCMG (24 June 1925 – 8 May 2002) was a British diplomat and ambassador to Cuba and Belgium.

Born in London, Jackson was a scholar at Ardingly College and went on to study at Corpus Christi College, Cambridge. He was later commissioned in the RNVR. Demobbed in 1946 in the rank of sub-lieutenant, Jackson joined the Foreign Office the following year. In 1956 Jackson was posted to Bonn to liaise between the Allied occupying forces and the embassy. From Bonn he was posted in 1960 to be consul at Guatemala City, a politically sensitive posting given Guatemala's longstanding claim to British Honduras (now Belize). In 1969 he then spent six months at the NATO Defence College in Rome before going to Berlin as political adviser and Head of Chancery at the British Military Government. Between 1970 and 1972 he played a crucial part in the talks between the occupying powers and the Russians. The negotiations led to West Berliners being able, for the first time in more than 25 years, to visit relatives in East Germany, and to West Berlin being able to be represented abroad by West Germany. From 1973-1975 Jackson served as head of the Defence Department at the Foreign Office. He served as British Ambassador to Cuba from 1975–1979. As there was no American presence in Cuba Jackson went several times to Washington to brief the State Department, and George H. W. Bush when he was head of the CIA. He went on to serve as British Ambassador to Belgium from 1982–1985. Jackson was appointed CMG in 1977 and knighted KCMG in 1984. In retirement he served as a trustee of the Imperial War Museum.

== Honours ==
- Knight Commander of the Order of St Michael and St George (KCMG) - 1984

Diplomatic posts
Preceded by Stanley Fingland	British Ambassador to Cuba; 1975–1979	Succeeded by John Ure
Preceded by Sir Peter Wakefield	British Ambassador to Belgium; 1982–1985	Succeeded by Sir Peter Petrie, 5th Baronet
