= Petrie baronets =

Baronetcy in the Baronetage of the United Kingdom

The Petrie Baronetcy, of Carrowcarden, Castleconnor, in the Barony of Tireragh in the County of Sligo, is a title in the Baronetage of the United Kingdom. It was created on 20 June 1918 for Sir Charles Petrie, Lord Mayor of Liverpool from 1901 to 1902. The third Baronet was a well-known historian. The fifth Baronet was a prominent diplomat and served as British Ambassador to Belgium from 1985 to 1989.

== Petrie baronets, of Carrowcarden (1918) ==
- Sir Charles Petrie, 1st Baronet (1853–1920)
- Sir Edward Lindsay Haddon Petrie, 2nd Baronet (1881–1927)
- Sir Charles Alexander Petrie, 3rd Baronet (1895–1977)
- Sir (Charles) Richard Borthwick Petrie, 4th Baronet (1921–1988)
- Sir Peter Charles Petrie, 5th Baronet (1932–2021)
- Sir Charles James Petrie, 6th Baronet (born 1959)

The heir apparent to the title is his son Arthur Cecil Petrie (born 1987)

== Arms ==
Coat of arms of Petrie baronets
Crest A demi-eagle displayed Proper gazing at a sun Or. Escutcheon Azure on a bend between in chief a stag’s head couped and in base three crosses crosslet fitchée Argent as many escallops Gules. Motto Fide Sed Vide
