= Minley Manor =

19th-century English country manor house

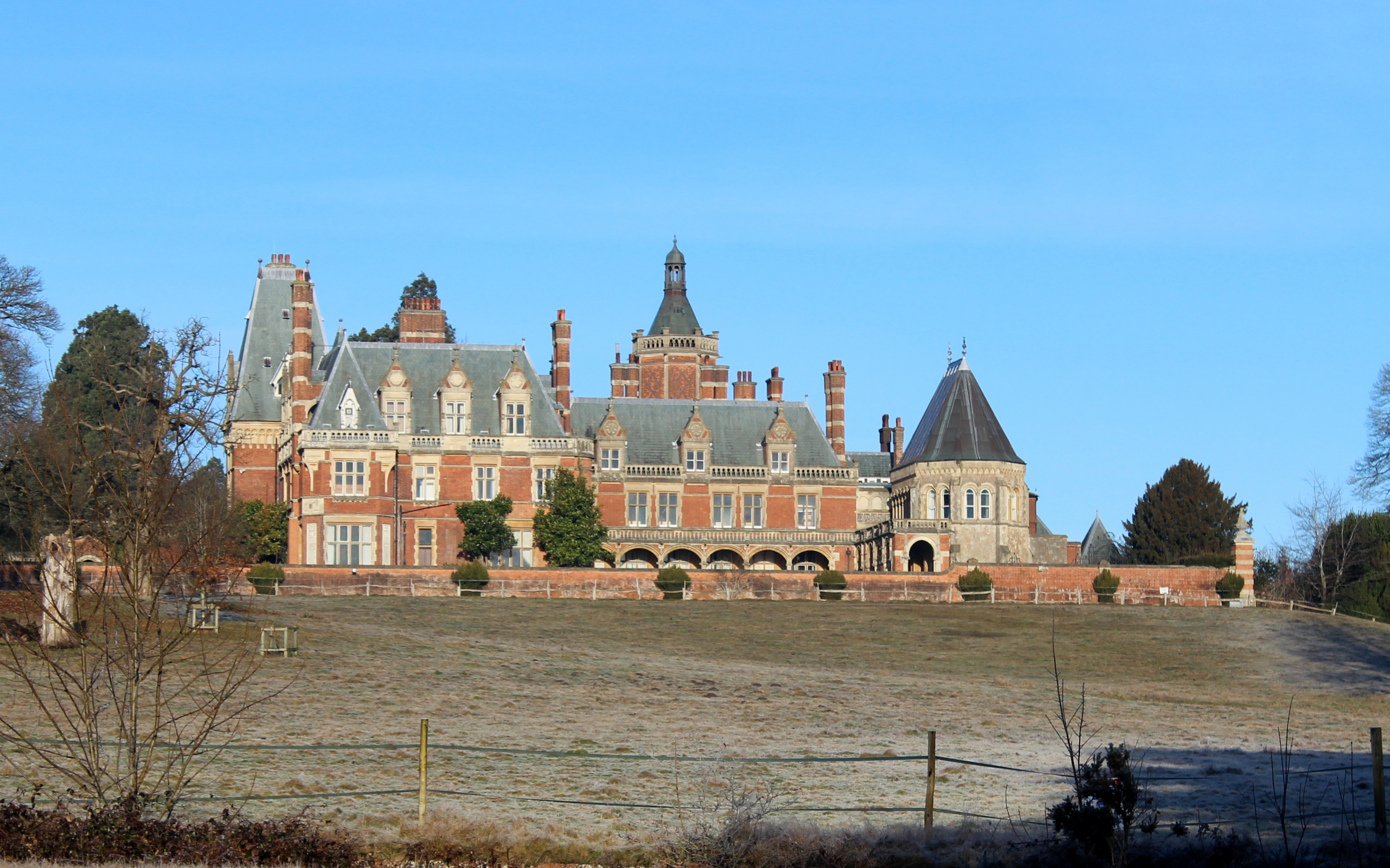
- Minley Manor

- Shown in Hampshire
- 51.317°N 0.820°W
- Location: Minley

History
- Built: 1860

Site notes
- Architect: Henry Clutton
- Architectural style: French Gothic

Listed Building – Grade II*
- Official name: Minley Manor
- Designated: 26 June 1987
- Reference no.: 1258061

Listed Building – Grade II
- Official name: Park and Garden
- Designated: 7 December 1992
- Reference no.: 1001264

Minley Manor is a Grade II* listed country manor house, located within a Grade II registered garden, built in the French Gothic style by Henry Clutton in the 1860s with further additions in the 1880s. The Manor is situated 2 miles north of junction 4A of the M3 between Farnborough and Yateley in Hampshire, England and is situated in 80 acres (32 ha) of grounds.

== History ==
The current manor house was built in the French style by Henry Clutton between 1858 and 1860 for Raikes Currie, a partner in Glyn Mills' Bank and a member of the Currie family. Through this bank, they were early financiers of South Australia, a colony developed for the British government, and thus had some ties related to slavery and the colony. During the next three years attention turned to the estate, with the creation of formal gardens around the house and a kitchen garden. The remainder was landscaped as pleasure gardens by F W Meyer, working with the horticulturists Veitch & Sons of Exeter. On Raikes' death in 1881, his son Bertram Wodehouse Currie continued the development, employing Messrs Veitch to lay out a Winter Garden and extensions to the pleasure gardens, which included Hawley Lake, in the 1880s. The house was the birthplace of the British diplomat Sir Reginald Hoare in 1882. Raikes' grandson Laurence Currie built a water tower, created a new complex of walled gardens and further extended the ornamental planting and woodland.

The property passed to the War Office in 1934, initially for the Senior Wing of the nearby Staff College, Camberley. It was used by the Royal Engineers, from 1971, as a brigade headquarters and then, from 1990, as an officers' mess for units at Gibraltar Barracks, which are located on the opposite side of the A327 Minley Road.

In 2013, as part of the RSME-PPP project, the Holdfast consortium built a new officers' mess on the Gibraltar Barracks site. The Ministry of Defence part-funded this project from sale of the manor which was sold to an international investor in November 2014. The international investor submitted planning permission to change the use of the manor in to a five star hotel, spa, conference centre and Chinese culture centre.

On the 22 October 2018 a large fire engulfed the water tower, part of the Minley Manor estate. The owners of the estate, Strong Property (UK) Ltd, applied for planning permission to restore the tower in December 2019; however the request was rejected in April 2020 on the basis that the original iron water tank would not have been retained.

== In popular culture ==
One of the main features is a 600-metre Wellingtonia tree avenue, which was shown off to good effect in the 1969 movie Mosquito Squadron, where the manor house played the part of a French château used as a prisoner of war camp and factory for the V-1 flying bomb. The manor was also used as a location in the 2007 Victorian fantasy movie Stardust, starring Robert De Niro and Michelle Pfeiffer.

The manor was used as the location for the external shots of Three Gables aka the titular Crooked House in the 2017 film Crooked House.

The feature film Detective Pikachu, released in 2019, used the training bridge, also in the Manor's grounds, as the setting for the pivotal car crash. The grounds of Minley Manor featured in the Netflix movie, Enola Holmes, released in 2020.
