= Eric Steinthal =

England international rugby union player

- Full name: Francis Eric Steinthal
- Born: 21 November 1886 Bradford, Yorkshire, England
- Died: 23 May 1974 (aged 87) Cuckfield, Sussex, England

Rugby union career
- Position: Centre
International career
Years	Team	Apps	(Points)
1913	England	2	(0)

Francis Eric Steinthal (21 November 1886 – 23 May 1974), also known as Francis Eric Petrie, was an English international rugby union player.

Of German-Jewish descent, Steinthal was born in Bradford and attended Bradford Grammar School. His father was a local yarn merchant and his mother an artist. He read history at Trinity College, Oxford.

Steinthal, an Oxford blue, was a centre three-quarter and represented Yorkshire from 1906 to 1913. He gained two England caps during their grand slam-winning 1913 Five Nations campaign, in back to back matches against Wales at Cardiff and France at Twickenham.

In World War I, Steinthal adopted his mother's maiden name Petrie, to serve in the Royal Fusiliers.

Steinthal was a schoolmaster by profession and married German-born artist Maria Petrie (née Zimmern). They immigrated to Santa Barbara, California, and he took up American citizenship in 1949, but lived his final years back in England, after the death of his wife.

== See also ==
- List of England national rugby union players
