= John Beith =

British diplomat

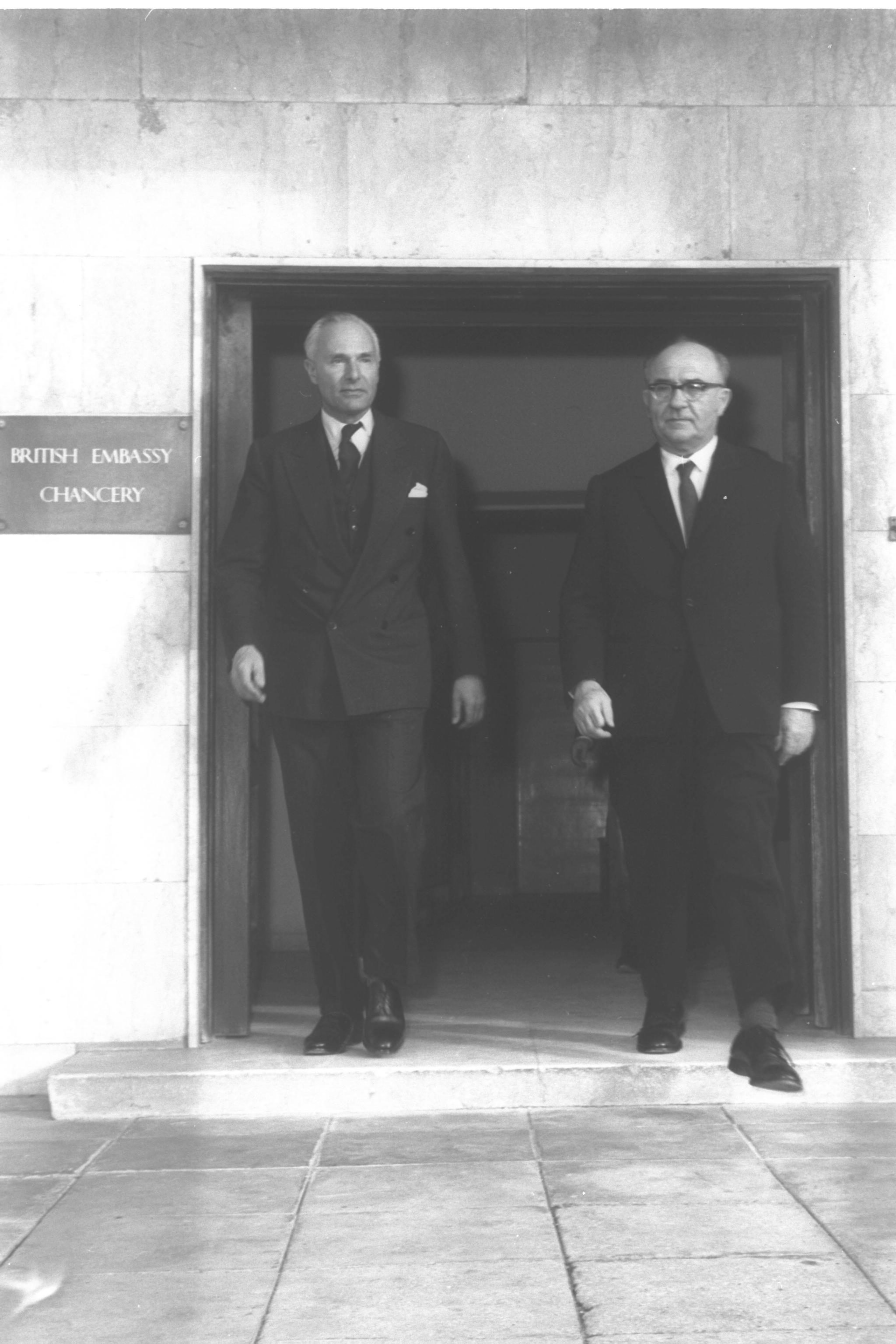
Ambassador John Beith and P.M. Levi Eshkol leaving the British embassy in Tel Aviv, 1965

Sir John Beith KCMG (4 April 1914 – 4 September 2000) was a British diplomat, ambassador to Israel and Belgium.

== Career ==
John Greville Stanley Beith was educated at Eton College and King's College, Cambridge. He entered the Diplomatic Service in 1937 and served at the Foreign Office until 1940 when he was posted to Athens. When the German army approached Athens in April 1941 the British Embassy was evacuated and Beith spent the rest of the war in Buenos Aires. He returned to the Foreign Office 1945–49 and was then Head of the UK Permanent Delegation to the United Nations at Geneva 1950–53, Head of Chancery at Prague 1953–54 and Head of Chancery at Paris 1954–59. He returned to the Foreign Office again as head of the Levant department 1959–61 and head of the North and East Africa department 1961–63. He was Ambassador to Israel 1963–65, assistant Secretary-General of NATO 1966–67 and Assistant Under-Secretary of State at the Foreign Office 1967–69, during which he led the British delegation in talks on the future of Gibraltar, which ended with the 1967 Gibraltar sovereignty referendum. Beith's final diplomatic post was as Ambassador to Belgium, 1969–74.

John Beith was appointed CMG in the 1959 New Year Honours and knighted KCMG in the 1969 Birthday Honours.

Few postwar British diplomats had a greater gift for making friends in the countries to which they were accredited, or for solving knotty problems over a drink or meal, than Sir John Beith ... Foreigners rightly considered him a man of utmost probity, who saw both sides of a question and with whom it was a pleasure to do business.

— Obituary, The Guardian, London, 13 September 2000

== Family ==
In 1949 John Beith married Diana Gregory-Hood, daughter of Sir John Gilmour, 2nd Baronet. Her father's sister, Mary Gilmour, had married Hughe Knatchbull-Hugessen who was ambassador to Belgium 1944–47.

Diplomatic posts
Preceded by Patrick Hancock	Ambassador Extraordinary and Plenipotentiary at Tel Aviv; 1963–65	Succeeded by Michael Hadow
Preceded by Sir Roderick Barclay	Ambassador Extraordinary and Plenipotentiary at Brussels; 1969–74	Succeeded by Sir David Muirhead
