= Petrie of Rochdale =

English steam engine manufacturer founded in 1792

Alexander Petrie and Co.
- Industry: Engineering
- Founded: 1792
- Headquarters: Rochdale
- Number of locations: Phoenix Factory
- Products: Iron founders and engineers, stationary steam engines
- Owner: 1792- Alexander Petrie. 1816-

Alexander Petrie and Co was a company that manufactured stationary steam engines. It was based in Rochdale, Greater Manchester in England. The company did general millwrighting, producing some steam engines during the 19th century. Around 1845, their superintendent, William McNaught, was producing large steam-driven beam engines for textile mills in Rochdale.

== History ==
Alexander Petrie, an iron founder and millwright from Cumberland, set up a small firm in Bury about 1792. His son, John Petrie served his apprenticeship with him in Bury, and then converted some cottages behind Cheetham St, Rochdale. John Petrie, was successful taking much business from his father. His father closed down and joined his son in a new firm Alexander Petrie and Son, where they were described in 1816-7 as ‘Iron & Brass Founders’. In 1818, they built and equipped a new, larger foundry the Phoenix Foundry, on Whitehall Street. They made their first steam engine in 1819. It was an 8 hp (nominal) engine for James King of Leavengreave. This was the first steam engine built in Rochdale. It was sold at £300. (£22737 current prices). By 1845, they employed William McNaught (Rochdale) as the factory superintendent, and he also designed engines, such as the pair of 120 hp nominal (700 hp indicated) beam engines for Bright's New Mill in 1845. McNaught left and founded his own firm. In 1853, John Petrie, junior patented and made the first automatic wool-washing machine.

Petries continued to make ever larger engines. For instance Brierfield Mills, Brierfield, near Burnley, Lancs, who were cotton spinners and weavers bought a horizontal engine for their spinning mill from Petries in 1894. It probably replaced a beam engine. It was designed to develop 1,500 ihp at 57rpm. The cylinders were 24, 36, 42, and 42in bore by 5 ft stroke, all with twist cut-off piston-valves, that had been developed by McNaught, and with internal valves for the high-and intermediate-cylinders. The 24 ft flywheel drove by 36 ropes. Eight Petrie boilers provided steam at 160psi for this engine and two other Petrie engines, and one from Burnley Ironworks. These engines were finally scrapped in 1959.

J & W McNaught amalgamated with Petries to form Petrie and McNaught.

== Petrie and McNaught ==
They became a public company in 1920, and by 1936 they were manufacturing washing and drying machinery for textile industry. In 1961 they were manufacturers of washing and drying machines, green crop and grain drying plants, baling presses for scrap metals and complete carbonising plants, with 233 employees.

== Mills driven by their engines ==
- John King, Leavengreave, Facit.1819 ( 8 hp-nominal)
- John Whitworth, Facit.1820( 20 hp-nominal)
- Newall of Littleborough 1829
- Bright's (120 hp-nominal- 700 hp-indicated)
- Whitelees, Littleborough 1842.
