= David Muirhead =

British diplomat (1918–1999)

Sir David Francis Muirhead KCMG CVO (30 December 1918 – 3 February 1999) was a British diplomat, ambassador to Peru, Portugal and Belgium.

== Career ==
Muirhead was educated at Cranbrook School, Kent where he was a Cadet Serjeant in the Officers' Training Corps. He was commissioned in the Artists Rifles in 1937 with the rank of second lieutenant. In 1939, having passed the Officers Examination at RMC Sandhurst, he was appointed to the Bedfordshire and Hertfordshire Regiment and served during the Second World War in France, Belgium and South-East Asia. In 1946 he passed the Foreign Service Examination and was appointed to the Foreign Office. He was appointed consul at La Paz in 1948, and posted to Buenos Aires in 1949, Brussels in 1950, the Foreign Office in 1953, Washington in 1955 and the Foreign Office again in 1959, where he was Under-Secretary 1966–67. He was British Ambassador to Peru 1967–70, to Portugal 1970–74 and to Belgium 1974–78. He was a Special Representative of the Secretary of State for Foreign and Commonwealth Affairs 1979–94, was a member of the Council of St Dunstan's 1981–89 and a Commissioner of the Commonwealth War Graves Commission 1981–86.

He was appointed CVO in 1957, CMG in 1964, and knighted KCMG in 1976. He was awarded the Grand Cross of the Portuguese Military Order of Christ and the Grand Cross of the Peruvian Order of Distinguished Service.

Diplomatic posts
Preceded by Robert Marett	Ambassador from the United Kingdom to Peru; 1967–1970	Succeeded by Hugh Travers Morgan
Preceded by Sir Anthony Lambert	Ambassador from the United Kingdom to Portugal; 1970–1974	Succeeded by Hon. Sir Nigel Trench
Preceded by Sir John Beith	Ambassador from the United Kingdom to Belgium; 1974–1978	Succeeded by Sir Peter Wakefield

== Personal life ==
In 1942 David Muirhead married the Hon. Elspeth Hope-Morley, daughter of the 2nd Baron Hollenden and Lady Hollenden, née the Hon. Mary Gardner, daughter of Herbert Gardner, 1st Baron Burghclere. They had two sons and one daughter. Lady Muirhead (as she became) died in 1989.
