= Sir Peter Petrie, 5th Baronet =

British diplomat (1932–2021)

Sir Peter Charles Petrie, 5th Baronet, CMG (7 March 1932 – 28 October 2021) was a British diplomat.

== Career ==
Peter Petrie (whose father was the historian Sir Charles Petrie) was educated at Westminster School and Christ Church, Oxford. He served in the Grenadier Guards 1954–56 before entering the Foreign Service. Later, he served in the UK Delegation to NATO in Paris 1958–61 and the UK High Commission in Delhi 1961–64 (also Chargé d'Affaires in Kathmandu in 1963). He was posted to the Cabinet Office 1965–67, the UK Mission to the United Nations in New York 1969–73 and was Head of Chancery at Bonn 1973–76. He returned to the Foreign and Commonwealth Office as head of the European Integration Department 1976–79 before being appointed Minister in the Paris embassy 1979–85 and finally British Ambassador to Belgium 1985–89.

Petrie succeeded to the family baronetcy on the death of his half-brother in 1988. After retiring from the Diplomatic Service, he was a member of the Franco-British Council 1994–2002 (chairman of the British section 1997–2002) and a member of the Council of City University London 1997–2002.

Petrie was appointed a Companion of the Order of St Michael and St George (CMG) in the 1980 Birthday Honours and Chevalier of the Legion of Honour in 2006.

== Personal life ==
On 8 November 1958 Petrie married Liduina Maria Fortunata von Oberndorff (born 1933), daughter of Charles-Alphonse von Oberndorff and a grand-daughter of the German diplomat Alfred von Oberndorff. They had two sons and a daughter, including Charles James (born 1959), later the 6th baronet.

Petrie died on 28 October 2021, at the age of 89, and was succeeded by his elder son.

== Arms ==
Coat of arms of Sir Peter Petrie, 5th Baronet
Crest A demi-eagle displayed Proper gazing at a sun Or. Escutcheon Azure on a bend between in chief a stag’s head couped and in base three crosses crosslet fitchée Argent as many escallops Gules. Motto Fide Sed Vide

Diplomatic posts
Preceded by Sir Edward Jackson	British Ambassador to Belgium; 1985–1988	Succeeded by Robert O'Neill
Baronetage of the United Kingdom
Preceded by Richard Petrie	Baronet (of Carrowcarden); 1988–2021	Succeeded by Charles Petrie
