= Baron Hollenden =

Barony in the Peerage of the United Kingdom

Baron Hollenden, of Leigh in the County of Kent, is a title in the Peerage of the United Kingdom. It was created in 1912 for Samuel Morley, who had previously served as Governor of the Bank of England. He was the son of Samuel Morley and Rebekha Maria Hope and the elder brother of Arnold Morley. Lord Hollenden was succeeded by his son, the second Baron. He was High Sheriff of the County of London in 1917. In 1923 he assumed by deed poll the additional surname of Hope. On his death the title passed to his nephew, the third Baron. He was the only son of the Hon. Claude Hope Hope-Morley, younger son of the first Baron. Lord Hollenden was an Alderman of the City of London. As of 2014 the title is held by his son, the fourth Baron, who succeeded in 1999.

== Barons Hollenden (1912—) ==
- Samuel Hope Morley, 1st Baron Hollenden (1845–1929)
  - Geoffrey Hope Hope-Morley, 2nd Baron Hollenden (1885–1977)
  - Hon. Claude Hope-Morley (1887–1968)
    - Gordon Hope Hope-Morley, 3rd Baron Hollenden (1914–1999)
      - Ian Hampden Hope-Morley, 4th Baron Hollenden (1946—)
        - (1) Hon. Edward Hope-Morley (1981—)
          - (2) Fergus Hope-Morley (?—)
          - (3) Oscar Hope-Morley (2020—)
          - (4) Rowan Hope-Morley (2020—)
        - (5) Hon. Alastair Kim Hope-Morley (1990—)
        - (6) Hon. Henry Gordon Hope-Morley (1993—)
      - Hon. Robin Gordon Hope-Morley (1949—?)
      - (7) Hon. Andrew James Sundt Hope-Morley (1952—)

The heir apparent is the present holder's son, the Hon. Edward Hope-Morley (born 1981).

The heir apparent's heir apparent is the present holder's grandson, Fergus Hope-Morley (born ?).

== Arms ==
Coat of arms of Baron Hollenden
Crest A demi-gryphon Argent wings elevated Ermine holding between the claws a leopard’s head jessant-de-lys as in the arms. Escutcheon Argent a leopard’s head jessant-de-lys Sable between three gryphons' heads erased Gules. Supporters On either side a stag Proper chained around the neck and suspended therefrom an anchor Or. Motto Tenax Proposit
