= Augustus Prevost =

Governor of the Bank of England from 1901 to 1903

Sir Augustus Prevost, 1st Baronet (21 May 1837 – 6 December 1913) was Governor of the Bank of England from 1901 to 1903.

He was the son of banker George Prevost of Geneva, who moved in 1838 from Liverpool to London, where Augustus studied at University College before joining the family firm of Morris, Prevost and Co in 1856.

He became a partner in the firm in 1861 and senior partner in 1882, during which time the business evolved from a merchant into a private bank. He was also chairman of the Royal Exchange Assurance Corporation. A director of the Bank of England from 1881, he served as governor of the bank from 1901 to 1903. During Prevost's tenure as governor, the Panic of 1901 occurred.

On 8 January 1903 Prevost was made Baronet Prevost of Westbourne Terrace, London. This was in recognition of his services as Governor of the Bank of England during the Boer War.

He died with no heir in Brighton in 1913 and the baronetcy became extinct. The company of Morris, Prevost and Co was taken over by Barings Bank the following year. He had married Francis Fordham in 1867.

== Arms ==
Coat of arms of Prevost of Westbourne Terrace
Crest A demi-lion rampant Azure, charged with a mural crown Or, the sinister paw grasping a sword as in the arms. Escutcheon Azure, a dexter arms in fesse issuing from a cloud in the sinister fesse point, the hand grasping a sword erect Proper, in chief two mullets Argent. Supporters Two grenadiers of the 16th (or Bedfordshire) regt. of infantry each supporting with the exterior hand a flag Gules that on the dexter inscribed 'WEST INDIES' and that on the sinister inscribed 'CANADA' in letters of gold (Granted by royal warrant in 1817). Motto Servatum cineri; J'ai bien servi

Government offices
Preceded by Samuel Steuart Gladstone	Governor of the Bank of England; 1901–1903	Succeeded by Samuel Hope Morley
Baronetage of the United Kingdom
New creation	Baronet (of Westbourne Terrace); 1903–1913	Extinct
Preceded by Renshaw baronets	Prevost baronets of Westbourne Terrace; 8 January 1903	Succeeded by Makins baronets
