= Luca Petri =

Italian footballer

Personal information
- Date of birth: 31 January 1989 (age 37)
- Place of birth: Pisa, Italy
- Height: 1.83 m (6 ft 0 in)
- Position: Defender

Youth career
- Fiorentina

Senior career*
Years	Team	Apps	(Gls)
2008–2009	Fiorentina	0	(0)
2008–2009	→ Montevarchi (loan)	2	(0)
2009–2011	Lucchese	21	(0)
2011	→ Lecco (loan)	2	(0)
- * Club domestic league appearances and goals as of 16:10, 7 May 2010 (UTC)

Luca Petri (born 31 January 1989, in Pisa) is an Italian professional footballer.

In January 2011 he joined Lecco on loan. Luca Bartoccini also left for Lucchese in exchange.
