= Sir Charles Petrie, 1st Baronet =

Scottish businessman and local politician

Sir Charles Petrie Bt DL
- Born: Newburgh, Fife
- Occupations: businessman and politician
- Known for: Lord Mayor of Liverpool in 1901–1902
- Spouse: Hannah Petrie
- Children: 2
- Father: Alexander Petrie

Sir Charles Petrie, 1st Baronet DL (1853 – 8 July 1920) was a Scottish businessman and local politician, Lord Mayor of Liverpool in 1901–2.

== Life ==
Petrie was born near Newburgh, Fife, the son of Alexander Petrie of Carrowcarden, and went into the family fishery business; from 1855 his father was based in Sligo, Ireland, with a fishery on the River Moy, which Petrie joined after education at Wesley College, Dublin. In 1876 he set up on his own in Manchester, subsequently moving to Liverpool.

Petrie had salmon fisheries in Scotland and Ireland, and oyster fisheries in Ireland, at Fleetwood, and in Essex. He was leader of the Liverpool Conservatives, knighted in 1903 after his term as Lord Mayor, and created a baronet in 1918. He was a Deputy Lieutenant of Lancashire.

== Family ==
Sir Edward Petrie, 2nd Baronet and Sir Charles Petrie, 3rd Baronet were the sons of Petrie and his wife Hannah.

== Arms ==
Coat of arms of Sir Charles Petrie, 1st Baronet
Crest A demi-eagle displayed Proper gazing at a sun Or. Escutcheon Azure on a bend between in chief a stag’s head couped and in base three crosses crosslet fitchée Argent as many escallops Gules. Motto Fide Sed Vide

== Notes ==
Baronetage of the United Kingdom
New creation	Baronet (of Carrowcarden); 1918–1920	Succeeded by Edward Petrie
