= Maria Petrie =

German sculptor (1887-1972)

- Born: Maria Sophia Zimmern; 1887
- Died: 1972 (aged 84–85); Santa Barbara
- Known for: Sculpture

Maria Petrie (née Zimmern, 1887–1972) was a German-born artist renowned for her figurative sculpture, particularly her portrait busts. She was also known for her influential work in the field of Art Therapy.

== Personal life ==
Petrie was born in August 1887 in Frankfurt, Germany. She lived for a time in Paris. Petrie was living in Ilkley, Yorkshire in 1926. In 1928 and 1937 Petrie was recorded as living in London.

Maria Zimmern married Francis Eric Steinthal (1886–1974), a teacher who also played rugby for England in 1913. In 1916 Maria gave birth to a son named Martin. During the First World War, the family changed their surname to Petrie (Francis' mother's maiden name). This followed his brother changing his name to serve in a leadership position in the army. The family were friends of Wilfred Owen when he was convalescing in Edinburgh.

Petrie moved to the United States of America in the 1950s. She died in Santa Barbara in 1972.

== Education ==
Petrie first studied at the Staedel Art Institute in Frankfurt for three years, later in Paris. Her teachers in Paris included Aristide Maillol, Paul Sérusier, Maurice Denis and Théo von Rysselberghe.

== Artwork ==
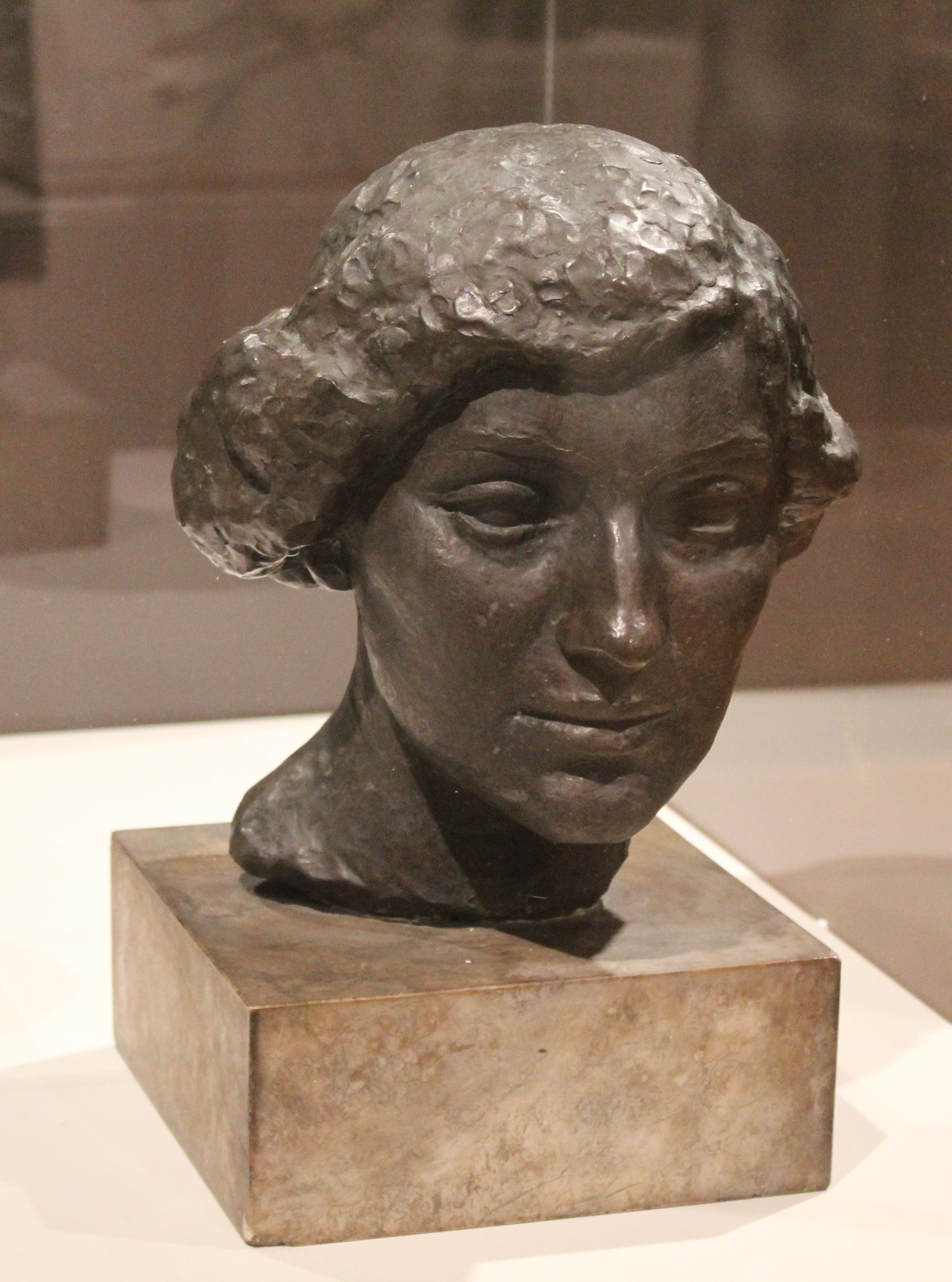
Portrait Study, 1911, Manchester Art Gallery

Petrie exhibited sculpture regularly throughout her career. She showed work in Paris (Gallerie Druet, 1911 and the Paris Salon) and Brussels before the First World War.

Petrie exhibited a bust of G. K. Chesterton at the Royal Academy in 1926. In 1928 and 1937 she exhibited at the Royal Scottish Academy. Petrie exhibited consecutively in 1934 and 1935 with Manchester Academy of Fine Arts, showing 'Portrait of Mr A. S. Wallace' (1934) and 'Child's Portrait' (1935). In 1936 she exhibited with the Society of Women Artists.

Petrie also created woodcuts, including a depiction of a mother and child for a 1922 Christmas card.

There are three busts by Petrie held in public collections in the United Kingdom. The National Portrait Gallery holds two bronze portrait busts, one depicting G. K. Chesterton of 1926 (probably exhibited at the RA), and a later work from 1959 portraying Aldous Huxley. Manchester Art Gallery has an earlier female portrait study from 1911.

== Published books ==
In 1946 Petrie's influential art therapy book 'Art and Regeneration' was published by Paul Elek. She later published a book on sculpting techniques entitled 'Modelling', published by Dryad Press in 1964.
