= Petry =

Surname

Petry, or Pétry, is a surname. Notable people with the surname include:

- Achim Petry (born 1974), German singer and musician
- Ann Petry (1908–1997), American author
- August Arthur Petry (1858–1932), German botanist and entomologist
- Christian Petry (born 1965), German politician
- Dan Petry (born 1958), American baseball player
- Ellen Petry Leanse (1958), American author, businesswoman, coach, educator, entrepreneur, and online community pioneer
- Frauke Petry (born 1975), German chemist, businesswoman and politician
- Irène Pétry (1922–2007), Belgian judge and socialist politician
- Jeff Petry (born 1987), American ice hockey player
- Juliusz Petry (1890–1961), Polish writer
- Lasse Petry (born 1992), Danish footballer
- Leroy Petry (born 1979), American soldier and Medal of Honor recipient
- Lucile Petry Leone (1902–1999), American nurse
- Michael Petry (born 1960), American artist
- Michael Petry (footballer) (born 1976), German footballer
- Valentin Petry (1928–2016), German racing cyclist
- Wolfgang Petry (born 1951), German musician
- Zsolt Petry (born 1966), Hungarian footballer

== See also ==
- Petri
- Petrie, surname
