= George Petrie =

George Petrie may refer to:

- George Petrie (antiquarian) (1790–1866), Irish antiquarian, archaeologist and artist
- George Petrie (politician) (1793–1879), U.S. Representative from New York
- George Petrie (American football) (1866–1947), American educator and football coach
- George Petrie (actor) (1912–1997), American actor
