= Samuel Morley (MP) =

English woollen manufacturer and political radical

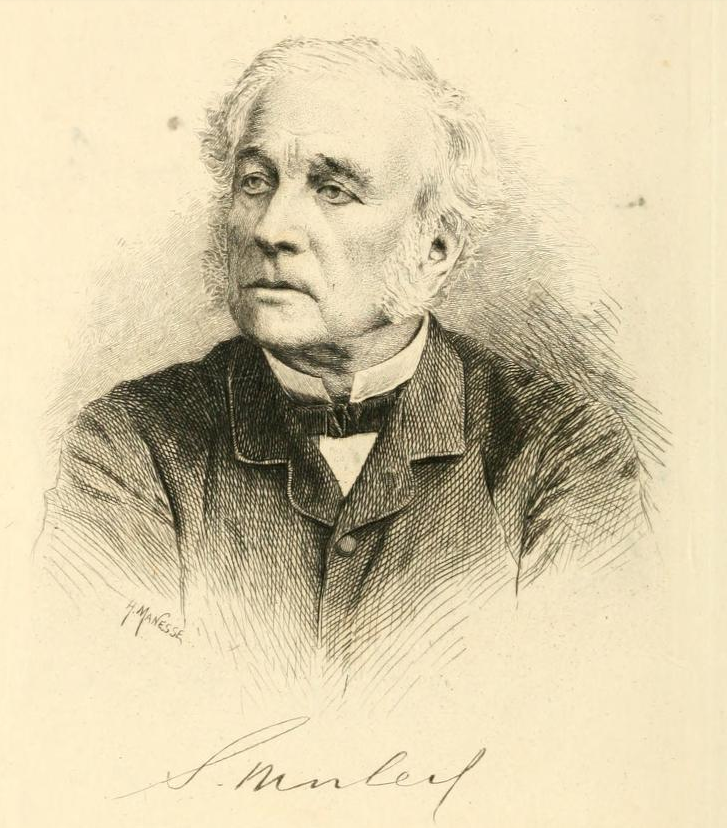
- Samuel Morley M.P. An etching signed H. Manesse published in his biography, 1887
- Born: 15 October 1809
- Died: 5 September 1886 (aged 76)
- Occupations: Woollen manufacturer and political radical
- Spouse: Maria Hope
- Children: Samuel Hope Morley, 1st Baron Hollenden; Arnold Morley

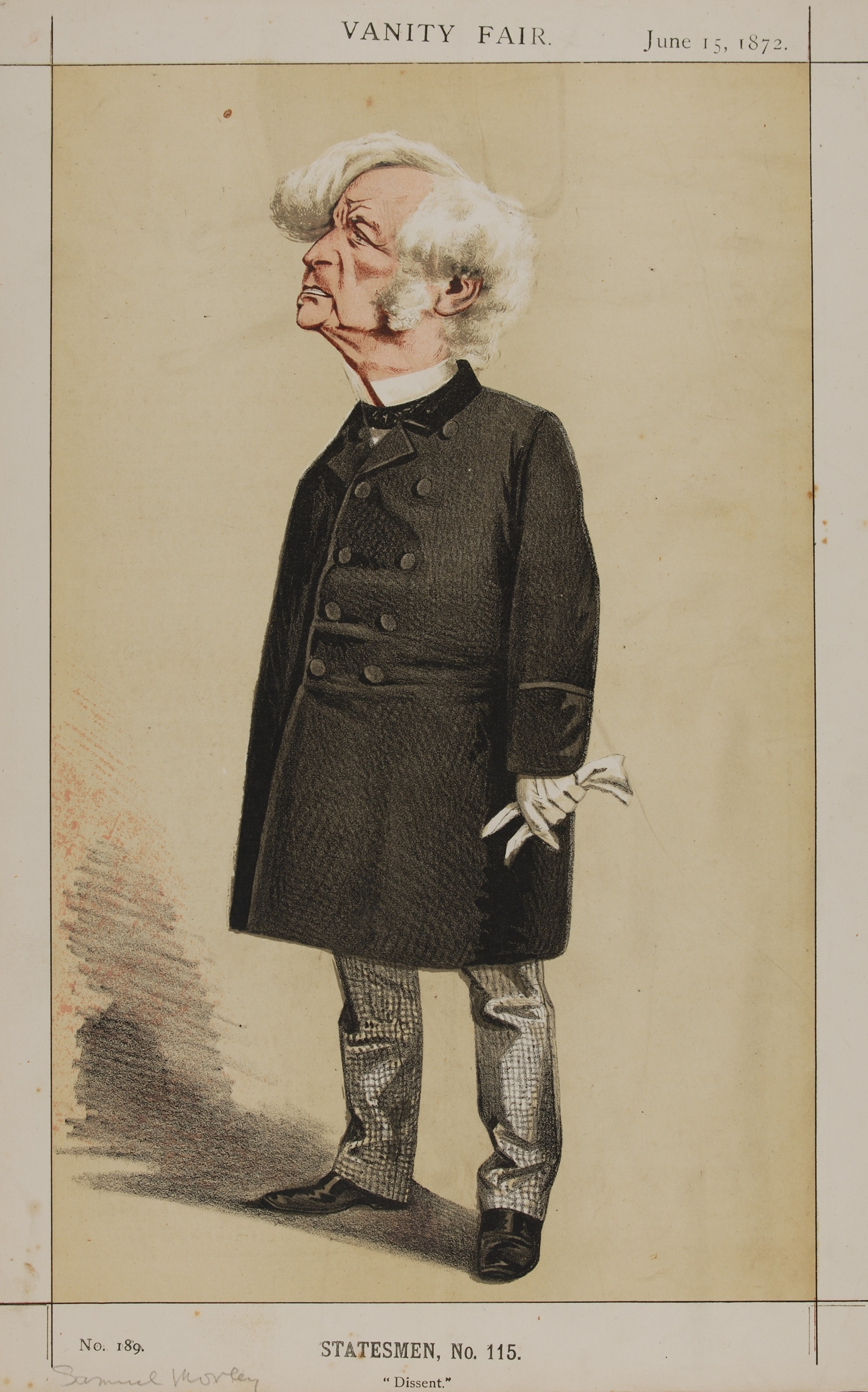
"Dissent". Caricature by Cecioni published in Vanity Fair in 1872

Samuel Morley (15 October 1809 – 5 September 1886), was an English woollen manufacturer and political radical. He is known as a philanthropist, Congregationalist dissenter, abolitionist, and statesman.

== Background ==
He was the youngest son of John Morley, the 'I' in I. & R. Morley, a Nottingham hosiery manufacturer, who opened offices in Wood Street, London. His mother was Sarah Poulton of Maidenhead. Born in Homerton, from an early age he worked for his father's business in London. When his father and brothers chose to retire, he was left in managerial control. By 1860 he was sole owner of both the London and Nottingham parts of the business, and as it grew rapidly into the largest of its kind in the world, he became very wealthy, and a model employer.

Morley took a large residence in the then suburban Stamford Hill, when not living at his City of London address. He was a member of Thomas Binney's King's Weigh House Congregational Chapel in Fish Street Hill, London.

He ventured into publishing, becoming one of the proprietors of the Daily News, the main Liberal paper of the period. By reducing its price, its losses turned to gains and carried greater influence.

As a Liberal, he was one of Gladstone's keen supporters, and was elected as an MP for Nottingham in 1865, and later Bristol (1868–85).

== Philanthropist and educationalist ==
Sometimes called the "Philanthropic Merchant", he was sufficiently eminent to be caricatured in Vanity Fair (15 June 1872). A contemporary biographer, writing in the Annual Register of World Events, considered that he would be remembered by posterity as "one of the leading merchant princes and philanthropists of the century".

Among many philanthropic ventures, Morley endowed Morley College in London for adult education. He was also treasurer of Homerton College, chairing its inauguration on 20 April 1852 as the new "Training Institution of the Congregational Board of Education", following the purchase, extension and rebuilding on the site of the old mansion and buildings of Homerton Academy.

In the late 1850s he served as President of the London Peace Society, overseeing a meeting held at Exeter Hall in 1859 against the War in Italy. In later life he became a strong advocate of temperance.

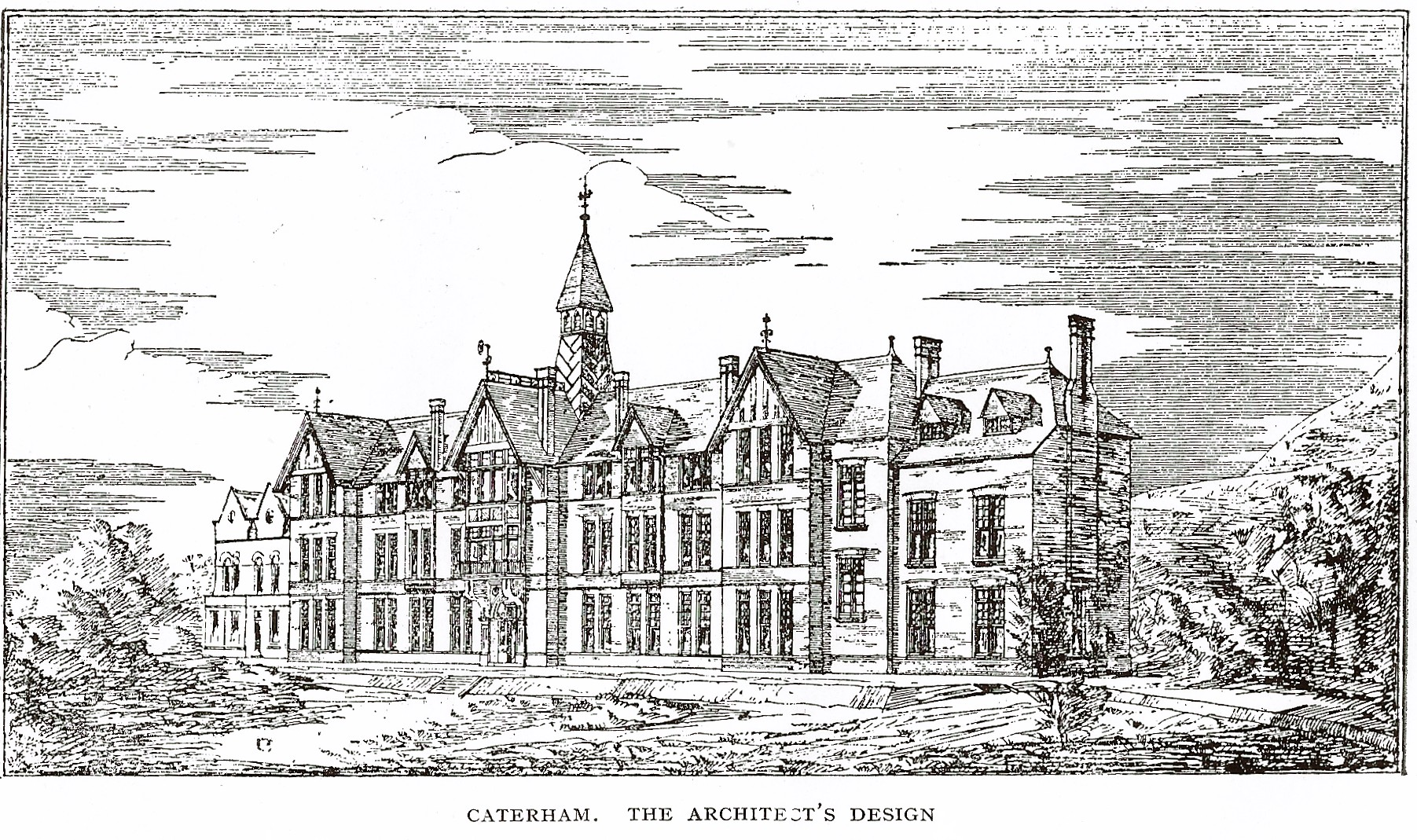
Morley laid the foundation stone for Caterham School in 1883.

Morley was also a benefactor and Chair of the Congregational School, originally in Lewisham. When it moved to Caterham, he laid the foundation stone for the new buildings in October 1883.

== Abolitionist ==
Morley supported abolitionism, a cause closely associated with 19th-century British Whigs and political radicals, and then the British Liberal party. He became treasurer of the fund to finance Josiah Henson, an escaped American slave who was given support in Britain. Josiah Henson later wrote Uncle Tom's Story of His Life: an Autobiography of the Rev. Josiah Henson (Mrs. Harriet Beecher Stowe's 'Uncle Tom'), from 1789 to 1876. It contained an introductory note by Morley and George Sturge (1798–1888), and a preface by Harriet Beecher Stowe. In his autobiography, Josiah Henson records,

I received numerous tokens of regard from many philanthropic gentlemen while I was in London, which I shall never forget; but I was particularly touched by the special kindness of Samuel Morley, Esq., and George Hitchcock, Esq., of St. Paul's Churchyard. These two gentlemen invited me to dine with them every day.

== Marriage ==
Morley married Rebekah Maria Hope, daughter of Samuel Hope of Liverpool. Their eldest son Samuel became Governor of the Bank of England and was elevated to the peerage as Baron Hollenden in 1912. Their younger son was the Liberal politician Arnold Morley.

== Death and commemoration ==
In the summer of 1886, it was clear that Morley's health was declining as he suffered an attack from pneumonia. Morley then died on the 5th of September at his home, Hall Place, near Tonbridge in Kent.

There is a statue to Samuel Morley in Bristol, and a second memorial above his place of interment in Dr Watts' Walk, Abney Park Cemetery, Stoke Newington, London. The latter is designed with elegant simplicity, as a large raised tomb, with a plain pediment to each end for nonconformists, even those as wealthy as Samuel Morley, generally resisted ostentatious memorials.

A bust of Morley, by Joseph Else, is to be found at the Waverley Street entrance to The Arboretum, Nottingham with lettering beneath his likeness describing him as an MP, merchant and philanthropist.

A Primitive Methodist chapel was erected in 1889 in Blue Bell Hill, Nottingham, and named in his memory the Morley Memorial Chapel.

In 2016, in recognition of his contributions to what would become Homerton College, Cambridge (serving as Treasurer of the Training Institution of the Congregational Board of Education, which would later evolve into Homerton), one of the postgraduate accommodation buildings (and the location of the new Middle Combination Room) was named 'Morley House'.

Parliament of the United Kingdom
Preceded by Charles Paget; Sir Robert Juckes-Clifton	Member of Parliament for Nottingham; 1865–1866; With: Sir Robert Juckes-Clifton	Succeeded by Ralph Bernal Osborne; Viscount Amberley
Preceded by Francis Berkeley; John Miles	Member of Parliament for Bristol; 1868–1885; With: Francis Berkeley 1868–1870; Elisha Smith Robinson 1870; Kirkman Hodgson 1870–1878; Lewis Fry 1878–1885	Constituency abolished
