= Luigi Petri =

Italian painter (1860–1911)

- Born: 8 September 1860; Florence
- Died: 28 March 1911 (aged 50); Florence

Luigi Petri (8 September 1860 – 28 March 1911) was an Italian painter and manuscript illuminator active in Florence.

== Biography ==
He was born in Florence. He studied design with the architect Leopoldo Massari. He is noted for his commissions for the Princess Maria Corsini, Senator Gadda, Senator Paolo Onorato Vigliani, and the commune of Livorno. He completed many commissions for the House of Savoy. He died in Florence on 28 March 1911 and was buried by the Ven. Arciconfraternita della Misericordia di Firenze.
