= William McNaught (Rochdale) =

British steam engineer (died 1888)

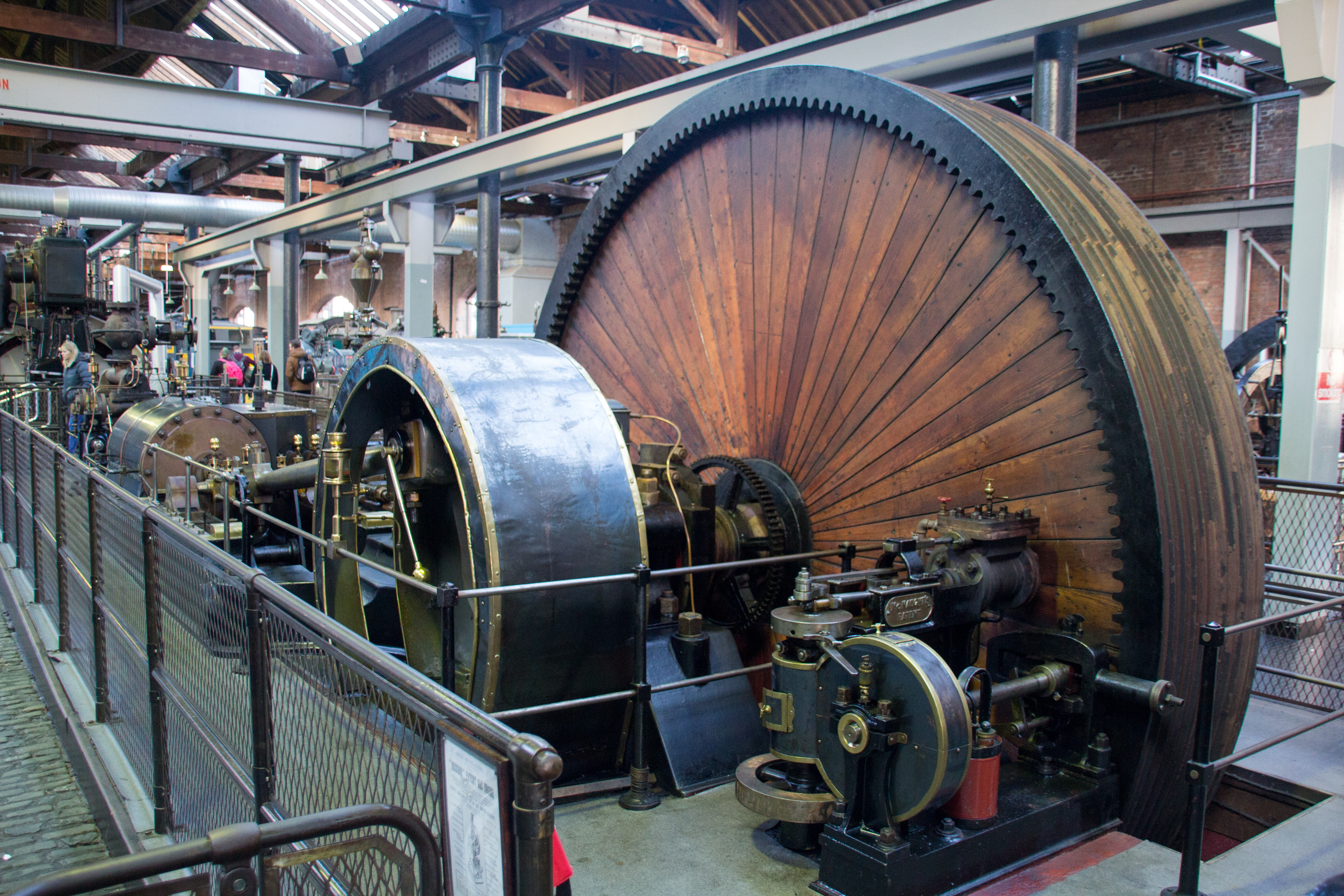
1907 McNaught mill engine, now at MOSI

William McNaught (1811 or 1812 - 1888) was a steam engine engineer from Rochdale, Lancashire, England.

McNaught was born in Manchester in (1811 or 1812 and apprenticed with a Mr Mills of Heywood, Bury. He then worked in London for John & Thomas Rennie before coming to Alexander Petrie & Son, around 1838.

McNaught became chief designer and superintendent at James Petrie's and designed a cutoff gear for use on a stationary steam engine. This was patented by James Petrie in 1844. Petrie started to build mill engines in 1819, McNaught joined in 1838 and remained until 1858, when he started his own company. Before this patent, there were problems with slide valves which suffered excessive wear. The Petrie and McNaught cutoff valves were circular with sloping faces that allowed a variable cut-off; they could be easily connected to the governor that McNaught patented in 1850.

In 1860 he left Petrie's to set up his own business building steam engines at the former Halstead's 'Union Foundry' at Wet Rake on Drake Street, Rochdale. He was so successful that by 1863 he had built the St George's Foundry on Crawford St. Rochdale.. When he retired in 1870, the firm was taken over by his sons John and William and became known as J&W McNaught. They later amalgamated with John Petrie becoming Petrie and McNaught.

William McNaught died on 11 February 1888, aged 76.
