= Bertram Wodehouse Currie =

English banker (1827–1896)

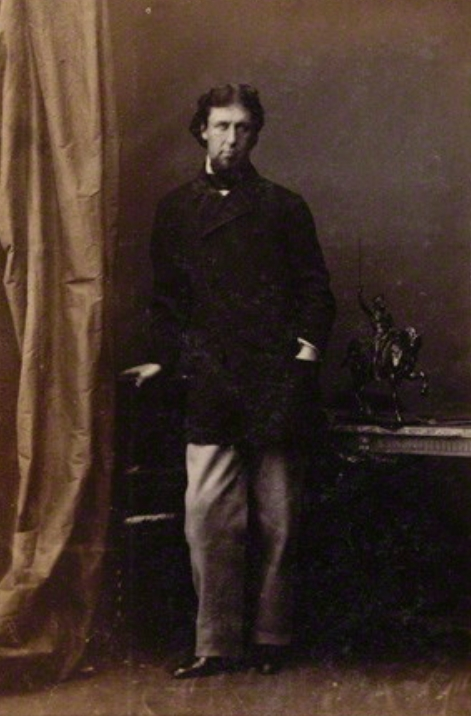
Bertram Wodehouse Currie. Albumen print by Camille Silvy, 1861. National Portrait Gallery, London.

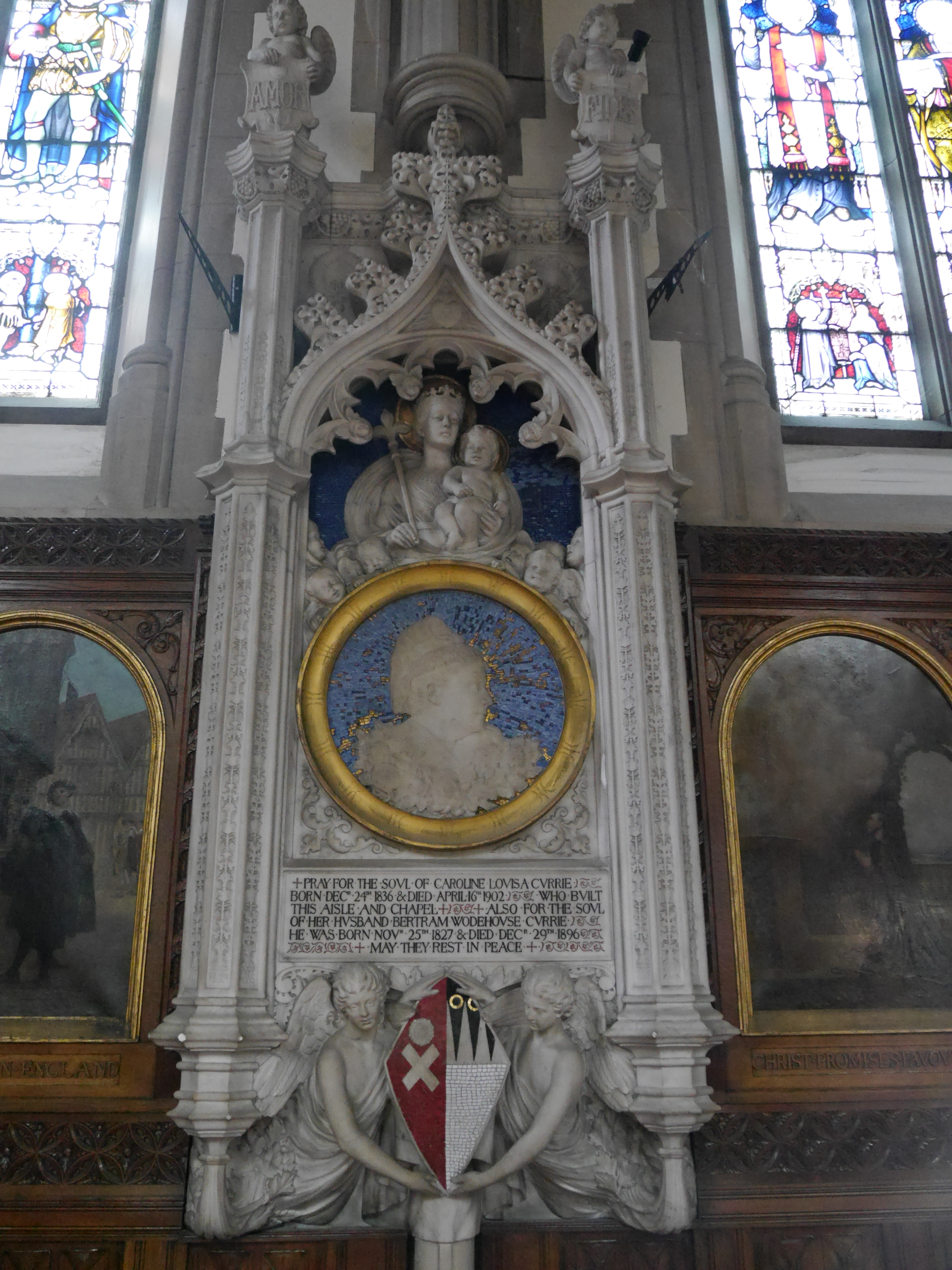
Memorial in Sacred Heart Church, Wimbledon

Bertram Wodehouse Currie (25 November 1827 – 29 December 1896) was a British banker, and High Sheriff of the County of London from 1892 to 1893.

== Early life ==
He was born at Harley Street, Marylebone, London, on 25 November 1827, the son of the banker and politician Raikes Currie and his wife the Hon. Laura Sophia Wodehouse, daughter of John Wodehouse, 1st Baron Wodehouse. He was educated at Eton College from 1840 to 1845, and afterwards in foreign languages in Weimar, Germany. His younger brother Philip Currie, 1st Baron Currie (1834–1906), was a diplomat, Ambassador to the Ottoman Empire from 1893 to 1898 and Ambassador to Italy from 1898 to 1902.

== Career ==
Educated at Cheam School and Eton Colleges, Currie spent time studying at Weimar, before returning to London and joining his father's banking business at 29 Cornhill in the City of London, which eventually became part of Glyn, Mills, Currie in 1864. He eventually became the bank's leading partner.

He was a member of the Council of India from 1880 to 1895 as its financial member.

== Marriage ==
On 31 October 1860, Currie married Caroline Louisa Young (1836/7–1902), the daughter of Sir William Lawrence Young, 4th Baronet, Conservative MP for Buckinghamshire from 1835 to 1842. They had two sons.

They lived at Minley Manor in Hampshire, which he inherited from his father, and at Coombe Warren (now demolished), near Kingston, London, a "suburban villa" built in 1868 by John Galsworthy's father and immortalized in The Forsyte Saga.

Their son, Laurence Currie JP (1867–1934), married Edith Sibyl Mary Finch, the daughter of the politician George Finch.

== Death ==
Currie converted to Roman Catholicism from agnosticism in October 1896, his wife having converted in 1862. He died on 29 December 1896, at 1 Richmond Terrace, Whitehall, London, and was survived by his wife.
