= Charles Petrie (diplomat) =

Sir Charles James Petrie, 6th Baronet, OBE (born 16 September 1959) is a United Nations diplomat. A former investment banker and management consultant, he then worked for the United Nations, before going independent.

== Early life ==
Petrie was educated at the American College in Paris, graduating BA in International Relations, and at INSEAD, where he gained the MBA degree.

== Career ==
=== Work with the UN ===
In 1989, Petrie was appointed as Chief of the UN Emergency Unit in Sudan, a position he held until 1992. From 1992 to 1994, he served as a Senior Humanitarian Affairs Officer in Somalia. In April 1994 he was transferred to Rwanda, where he served as the UN Deputy Humanitarian Coordinator, where he supported General Roméo Dallaire during the Rwandan genocide.

In 1995, Petrie was transferred to New York, where he served as Chief of Africa II Section, in the Department of Humanitarian Affairs within the UN Secretariat. After a year he returned to the field, in this case the Middle East, and while based in Gaza from 1996 to 1998 he assumed the responsibilities of Special Assistant to the Commissioner General of UNRWA. From 1998 to 2001, he was the Senior UN official responsible for initiating, developing and maintaining the UN's interactions with the different rebel movements throughout the Democratic Republic of the Congo.

In the last days of 2001, he was sent to Afghanistan where he initially served as an advisor to Dr. Ashraf Ghani, the senior Afghan Minister responsible for coordinating Afghanistan's reconstruction efforts, and subsequently became the Director of Policy and Planning for the UN mission. From July 2003 to December 2007, he was the UN Resident Coordinator, UN Humanitarian Coordinator & UNDP Resident Representative in the Union of Myanmar (Burma). In November 2007, he was asked by the military regime in Myanmar to leave the country for openly and actively supporting the Saffron Revolution. Following his departure, he was temporarily transferred to New York, as a UN senior advisor on conflict. In late October 2008, he was named the Deputy Special Representative of the Secretary General for Somalia. In April 2010, he was appointed as the Secretary General's Executive Representative for Burundi.

=== Post-UN ===
Petrie resigned from the UN at the end of 2010. From March 2011 to September 2012, he was the special policy advisor to the President of Somalia and as such spent significant periods of time in Mogadishu. In early December 2011, he undertook a mission into the area controlled by the Karen National Liberation Army 5th Brigade to assess the willingness of the armed resistance to engage in ceasefire talks with the Myanmar government. Following a request made by the President of Myanmar to the Norwegian Minister of Foreign Affairs in early 2012 that Norway support attempts at negotiating an end to the historic internal conflicts, Petrie was designated as the coordinator of the Norwegian led effort to support the ceasefires.

Petrie has also given lectures at Science-Po and HEC Paris and participated in the training of UN Resident and Humanitarian Coordinators on how in practice to promote the basic principles enshrined in the UN Charter and other related human rights and humanitarian law. In March 2012, Petrie was designated by the UN Secretary General to lead an internal review of the UN's actions in Sri Lanka during the last phase of the conflict. The report was presented to the Secretary General in November 2012, and led to a new policy within the UN called Rights-up-Front. In February 2015, Petrie was designated by the UN Secretary General one of seven members undertaking a review of the UN's Peacebuilding efforts. The report was submitted to the Presidents of the Security Council and General Assembly in July of the same year. The outcome of the discussions of the report led to the adoption of Security Council Resolution 2282 (2016).

In August 2021, Petrie published a book with Unbound entitled The Triumph of Evil - The Rwanda Genocide and the Search for Justice. Petrie was appointed Officer of the Order of the British Empire (OBE) in the 2014 New Year Honours for services to international peace, security, and human rights. Upon the death of his father Sir Peter Petrie, 5th Bt. CMG, Petrie inherited his father's baronetcy, becoming the 6th Baronet of Carrowcarden.

Baronetage of the United Kingdom
Preceded by Peter Petrie	Baronet (of Carrowcarden); 2021–present	Succeeded by Incumbent
