= Petree =

Petree is a surname. It may refer to:

- Andy Petree, newscaster and former NASCAR crew chief
- Gregori Chad Petree (born 1978), American musician
- Keats Petree (1919–1997), American illustrative artist
- Nick Petree, minor league pitcher for the Missouri State Bears

== See also ==
- Petrey (disambiguation)
