= List of ambassadors of the United Kingdom to Belgium =

The ambassador of the United Kingdom to Belgium is the United Kingdom's foremost diplomatic representative in Belgium, and in charge of the UK's diplomatic mission in Belgium. The official title is His Britannic Majesty's Ambassador to the Kingdom of Belgium.

== Heads of missions ==
=== Envoys extraordinary to the sovereign duchess of the Netherlands (1598- 1621) ===
- 1600–1601: Thomas Edmondes
- 1605–1609: Thomas Edmondes
- 1620: Sir Edward Conway

=== Envoys extraordinary to the general governor of the Spanish Netherlands ===
- 1665: Sir William Temple, Bt.
- 1671: Sir Robert Southwell Ambassador
- 1689–1692: John Andrew Eckhart Resident
- 1692–1696: Robert Wolseley
- 1696–1699: Richard Hill Envoy Extraoridinary to all parts of Netherlands
- 1699–1701: Mr Marmande Secretary

=== Envoys extraordinary at Brussels ===
- 1701–1706: Apparently no representation at Brussels
- 1706–1707: George Stepney
- 1707–1712: John Lawes in charge 1707–1708; then HM Secretary at Brussels
- 1707–1711: Maj.-Gen. William Cadogan (also accredited at The Hague)

=== Envoys to the Imperial Court at Brussels ===
- 1711–1713: The Earl of Orrery Envoy Extraordinary 1711–1712; Envoy Extraordinary and Plenipotentiary 1712–1713.
- 1712–1715: John Lawes Acting Minister Plenipotentiary; then Secretary
- 1714–1715: Lieut.-Gen. William Cadogan Envoy Extraordinary and Plenipotentiary
- 1715–1724: William Lethes HM Secretary at Brussels 1715–1717; Resident c.1718–1724
- 1722–1745: Robert Daniel in charge of affairs or Agent
- 1742–1744: Onslow Burrish Secretary 1742–1744; Resident 1744 (residing mainly at Liege)
- 1744–1752: No representation
- 1752–1757: Solomon Dayrolles Minister
- 1757–1763: Diplomatic Relations broken off due to Seven Years' War
- 1763–1765: Sir James Porter FRS
- 1765–1777: William Gordon
- 1777–1783: Alleyne FitzHerbert
- 1783–1792: George Byng, 4th Viscount Torrington
  - 1789–1792: Francis Wilson Chargé d'Affaires
- 1792–1794: Thomas Bruce, 7th Earl of Elgin

The Austrian Netherlands were then conquered by France. After the Napoleonic War, they were part of the Netherlands, then briefly known as the United Kingdom of the Netherlands until the Belgian Revolution of 1830.

=== Envoys extraordinary and ministers plenipotentiary ===
- 1830: John, Lord Ponsonby, special mission to Provisional Government
- 1831–1835: Robert Adair, special mission
  - 1835–1836: Henry Lytton Bulwer, Chargé d'Affaires
- 1836–1845: Sir George Hamilton Seymour
  - 1845–1846: Thomas Waller, Chargé d'Affaires
- 1846–1868: Charles Ellis, 6th Baron Howard de Walden
- 1868–1883: John Savile, 1st Baron Savile
- 1883–1884: Sir Edward Baldwin Malet, 4th Baronet
- 1884–1892: Hussey Vivian, 3rd Baron Vivian
- 1892–1893: Sir Edmond Monson, K.C.M.G.
- 1893–1900: Sir Francis Plunkett
- 1900–1906: Sir Constantine Phipps
- 1906–1911: Arthur Henry Hardinge
- 1911–1919: Sir Francis Hyde Villiers

=== Ambassadors extraordinary and plenipotentiary ===
- 1919–1920: Sir Francis Hyde Villiers
- 1920–1928: Sir George Grahame (and Minister to Luxembourg)
- 1928–1933: Granville Leveson-Gower, 3rd Earl Granville (and Minister to Luxembourg)
- 1933–1934: Sir George Clerk (and Minister to Luxembourg)
- 1934–1937: Sir Esmond Ovey (and Minister to Luxembourg)
- 1937–1939: Sir Robert Clive (and Minister to Luxembourg)
- 1939–1944: Sir Lancelot Oliphant
- 1944–1947: Sir Hughe Knatchbull-Hugessen
- 1947–1950: Sir George Rendel
- 1950–1951: Sir John Le Rougetel
- 1951–1955: Sir Christopher Warner
- 1955–1960: Sir George Labouchere
- 1960–1963: Sir John Nicholls
- 1963–1969: Sir Roderick Barclay
- 1969–1974: Sir John Beith
- 1974–1978: Sir David Muirhead
- 1979–1981: Sir Peter Wakefield
- 1982–1985: Sir Edward Jackson
- 1985–1989: Sir Peter Petrie, 5th Baronet
- 1989–1992: Robert O'Neill
- 1992–1996: Sir John Gray
- 1996–2001: David Colvin
- 2001–2003: Gavin Hewitt
- 2003–2007: Richard Kinchen
- 2007–2010: Rachel Aron
- 2010–2014: Jonathan Brenton
- 2014–2019: Alison Rose
- 2019–2024: Martin Shearman
- 2024–present: Anne Sherriff

== See also ==
- Belgium–United Kingdom relations
