= Arnold Morley =

British barrister and politician (1849–1916)

The Right Honourable Arnold Morley
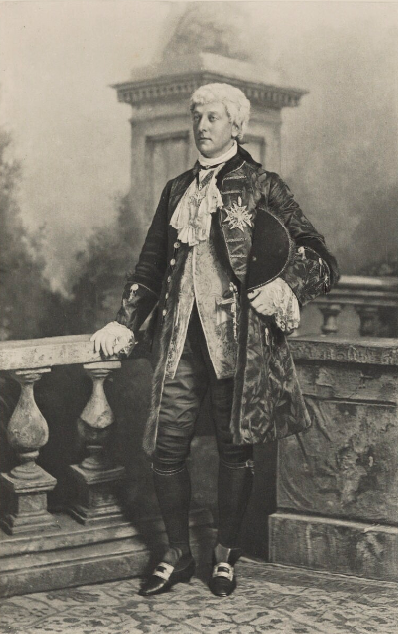

Parliamentary Secretary to the Treasury
- In office 6 February 1886 – 20 July 1886
- Monarch: Queen Victoria
- Prime Minister: William Ewart Gladstone
- Preceded by: Aretas Akers-Douglas
- Succeeded by: Aretas Akers-Douglas

Postmaster General
- In office 18 August 1892 – 21 June 1895
- Monarch: Queen Victoria
- Prime Minister: William Ewart Gladstone; The Earl of Rosebery
- Preceded by: Sir James Fergusson, Bt
- Succeeded by: The Duke of Norfolk

Personal details
- Born: 18 February 1849
- Died: 16 January 1916 (aged 66)
- Party: Liberal
- Parent: Samuel Morley (father)
- Relatives: Samuel Morley, 1st Baron Hollenden (brother)

Arnold Morley (18 February 1849 – 16 January 1916) was a British barrister and Liberal politician.

== Background ==
Morley was a younger son of Samuel Morley and Rebekah Maria, daughter of Samuel Hope of Liverpool. Lord Hollenden was his elder brother.

He was educated at Trinity College, Cambridge, was admitted to the Inner Temple in 1870, and called to the bar in 1873.

== Political career ==
Morley was elected Member of Parliament for Nottingham at a by-election in 1880, and held the seat until the constituency was divided for the 1885 general election. He was then elected as MP for the new Nottingham East constituency, and held that seat until his defeat at the 1895 general election. He served under William Ewart Gladstone as Parliamentary Secretary to the Treasury (chief government whip) between February and July 1886, and was then chief Liberal whip from 1886 to 1892 during the party's stay in opposition. When the Liberals returned to power under Gladstone in August 1892, Morley was sworn of the Privy Council and appointed Postmaster General, with a seat in the cabinet. He retained this post until 1895, the last year under the premiership of the Earl of Rosebery.

== Personal life ==
Morley died unmarried in January 1916, aged 66.

Parliament of the United Kingdom
Preceded by John Skirrow Wright; Charles Seely	Member of Parliament for Nottingham; 1880 – 1885; With: Charles Seely	Constituency abolished
New constituency	Member of Parliament for Nottingham East; 1885 – 1895	Succeeded by Edward Bond
Political offices
Preceded by Aretas Akers-Douglas	Parliamentary Secretary to the Treasury; 1886	Succeeded by Aretas Akers-Douglas
Preceded by Sir James Fergusson, Bt	Postmaster General; 1892–1895	Succeeded by The Duke of Norfolk
