= Sir Charles Petrie, 3rd Baronet =

British historian

Sir Charles Alexander Petrie Bt CBE
- Born: 28 September 1895; Liverpool, England, United Kingdom of Great Britain and Ireland
- Died: 13 December 1977 (aged 82)
- Education: Oxford degree
- Occupation: Historian

Sir Charles Alexander Petrie, 3rd Baronet CBE (28 September 1895 – 13 December 1977) was a British historian.

== Early life ==
Born in Liverpool, he was the younger son of Sir Charles Petrie, 1st Baronet, and his wife, Hannah. He was educated at the University of Oxford, and in 1927 succeeded to the family baronetcy.

== Career ==
Petrie was known for his interest in royalism and Jacobitism, particularly for his 1926 essay in counterfactual history, If: A Jacobite Fantasy. It has Bonnie Prince Charlie go on from Derby to Oxford (albeit to a cool reception), but just as all seems lost, the Duke of Newcastle appears in haste to tell him that George II, the head of the House of Hanover dynasty, has fled back to Hanover, and belatedly declares his loyalty. (It has been speculated by some historians that Newcastle, known to have flirted with Jacobitism, was actually contemplating a judicious "conversion" to the Stuart cause when the Prince's army reached Derby.) As a result, large elements of the people and army came over to the Stuart side, and there was never the disastrous retreat and thus, there was never a Battle of Culloden in 1746, all leading to a Jacobite restoration and to the successive reigns of James III (The Old Pretender), Charles III, Henry IX and the continued tenure of the House of Stuart until the 20th century. It also depicts the American Revolution as not taking place because of the judicious intervention of Charles Edward, George Washington going on to become a great British general, and other flights of fantasy. He was a member of the Jacobite Royal Stuart Society.

Several of Petrie's books deal with Charles I's government towards which he was broadly sympathetic. He published biographies of Lord Bolingbroke, of the early-20th-century British cabinet minister Walter Long, and of three Spanish kings: Philip II, Charles III, and Alfonso XIII. Another biography of his dealt with a fourth notable Spaniard, Philip II's half-brother Don John of Austria.

During the 1930s Petrie flirted with the far right. Impressed at first by Benito Mussolini on whom he produced a short and respectful book in 1931, he attended the 1932 Volta Conference of fascists and sympathisers. Disposed initially to favour Sir Oswald Mosley, he joined in 1934 the broadly pro-Mosley January Club. At the same time, he remained publicly hostile towards Nazism, and his later view of Mosley, as expressed in his 1972 memoir A Historian Looks at his World, was thoroughly unflattering.

Among Petrie's journalistic posts was that of literary editor for the generally-conservative New English Review. He supported, with reservations, Spanish dictator General Francisco Franco and was a friend of a leading pro-Franco diplomat, the 17th Duke of Alba. Along with NER editor Douglas Francis Jerrold, Petrie formed in 1937 a group concerned to put the Nationalist case on the fighting in the Spanish Civil War. After 1945 he edited the Household Brigade Magazine, as well as writing regularly for the Illustrated London News and Catholic Herald, in addition to being co-editor (with Jerrold) of the New English Review's short-lived successor, English Review Magazine.

During the late 1930s, Petrie championed Neville Chamberlain but subsequently was an adherent, again with reservations, of Winston Churchill. In 1941, he attempted unsuccessfully to be adopted as Conservative Party candidate for Dorset South. He was rejected, according to Andrew Roberts in Eminent Churchillians, because he was too closely identified with appeasement.

He was appointed CBE in 1957.

== Works ==
- Two Essays in Spanish History, Hugh Egerton & Co., 1922.
- The White Rose: A Historical Drama in Three Acts, Hugh Egerton & Co., 1923.
- The History of Government, Little, Brown, and Company, 1929.
- Mussolini, Holme Press, 1931.
- The Jacobite Movement, Eyre and Spottiswoode, 1932.
- Monarchy, Eyre and Spottiswoode, 1933.
- The Stuart Pretenders – A History of The Jacobite Movement, 1688–1807, Houghton Mifflin Company, 1933.
- The History of Spain, Eyre And Spottiswoode, 1934 [with Louis Bertrand].
- Spain, Arrowsmith, 1934.
- The Letters Speeches and Proclamations of King Charles I, Cassell, 1935.
- The Four Georges A Revaluation of the Period From 1714 to 1830, Eyre & Spottiswoode, 1935.
- William Pitt, Duckworth, 1935.
- Walter Long and his Times, Hutchinson & Co., ltd. 1936.
- Lords of the Inland Sea: A Study of the Mediterranean Powers, L. Dickson Limited, 1937.
- Bolingbroke, Collins, 1937.
- The Stuarts, Eyre & Spottiswoode, 1937.
- The Chamberlain Tradition, L. Dickson, Limited, 1938.
- The Chamberlain Tradition, Frederick A. Stokes, 1938. Revised from the earlier English edition to incorporate current events.
- Louis XIV, T. Butterworth, ltd., 1938.
- The Life and Letters of The Right Hon. Sir Austen Chamberlain K.G., P.C., M.P, Cassel, 1939/1940 [2 volumes].
- Joseph Chamberlain, Duckworth, 1940.
- Twenty Years' Armistice – and After: British Foreign Policy Since 1918, Eyre and Spottiswoode, 1940.
- When Britain Saved Europe, the Tale and the Moral, Eyre and Spottiswoode, 1941.
- George Canning,, Eyre & Spottiswoode, 2nd ed., 1946.
- Hollis; Carter (1946). Diplomatic History, 1713–1933. Archived from the original on 22 December 2015 – via Questia.
- The Private Diaries (March 1940 to January 1941) of Paul Baudouin, 1948 [translator].
- Earlier Diplomatic History, 1492–1713, Hollis and Carter, 1949.
- The Jacobite Movement. The First Phase 1688–1716, Eyre & Spottiswoode, 1948.
- The Jacobite Movement. The Last Phase, 1716–1807, Eyre & Spottiswoode, 1950.
- Chapters of Life, Eyre & Spottiswoode, 1950.
- The Duke of Berwick and His Son; Some Unpublished Letters and Papers, Eyre and Spottiswoode, 1951.
- Monarchy in the Twentieth Century, A. Dakers, 1952.
- Spain in the Modern World, University of Nottingham: Montague Burton International Relations Lectures, 1952.
- The Marshal Duke of Berwick; The Picture of an Age, Eyre & Spottiswoode, 1953.
- Lord Liverpool and his Times, J. Barrie, 1954.
- The Carlton Club, Eyre & Spottiswoode, 1955.
- Wellington: A Reassessment, J. Barrie, 1956.
- The Powers Behind the Prime Ministers, MacGibbon & Kee, 1958.
- The Jacobite Movement, 1958 [revision].
- Daniel O'Conor Sligo: His Family and His Times, National University of Ireland, 1958.
- The Spanish Royal House, G. Bles, 1958.
- The Victorians, Eyre & Spottiswoode, 1960.
- The Modern British Monarchy, Eyre & Spottiswoode, 1961.
- King Alfonso XIII and His Age, Chapman & Hall, 1963.
- Philip II of Spain, Eyre & Spottiswoode, 1963.
- Scenes of Edwardian Life, Eyre & Spottiswoode, 1965.
- Don John of Austria, Eyre & Spottiswoode 1967.
- Great Beginnings in the Age of Queen Victoria, Macmillan & Company, 1967.
- The Letters of King Charles I, Funk & Wagnalls, 1968.
- The Drift to World War, 1900–1914, Benn, 1968.
- King Charles III of Spain: An Enlightened Despot, Constable 1971.
- A Historian Looks at His World, Sidgwick and Jackson, 1972.
- The Great Tyrconnel: A Chapter in Anglo-Irish Relations, Mercier Press, 1972.
- King Charles, Prince Rupert, and the Civil War: from Original Letters Routledge & Kegan Paul 1974 ISBN 0710079699

=== Articles ===
- "Madrid and Its Life To-day," The Living Age, 3 July 1926.
- "The Jacobite Activities in South and West England in the Summer of 1715," Transactions of the Royal Historical Society, vol. XVIII, 1935.
- "The Silver Jubilee of Queen Elizabeth II", The Contemporary Review, vol. 230, 1336 (1 May 1977): 242–247.

== Arms ==
Coat of arms of Sir Charles Petrie, 3rd Baronet
Crest A demi-eagle displayed Proper gazing at a sun Or. Escutcheon Azure on a bend between in chief a stag’s head couped and in base three crosses crosslet fitchée Argent as many escallops Gules. Motto Fide Sed Vide

== Notes ==
=== Bibliography ===
- Kidd, Charles; Williamson, David, eds. (2010). Debrett's Peerage and Baronetage (107th ed.). New York: St Martin's Press.
- Rayment, Leigh. "Petrie". Archived from the original on 1 May 2008.
- Mosley, Charles (2010). Burke's Peerage and Baronetage. Vol. 3 vols. Weidenfeld & Nicolson.
- Gibbs, Vicary; Doubleday, Henry; Cokayne, George E (1937). Complete Peerage of Great Britain and Ireland. Vol. 40. Cassel.

Baronetage of the United Kingdom
Preceded by Edward Lindsay Haddon Petrie	Baronet (of Carrowcarden); 1927–1977	Succeeded by Charles Richard Borthwick Petrie
