= Christopher Warner (diplomat) =

British diplomat (1895–1957)

Sir Christopher Frederick Ashton Warner, GBE, KCMG (17 January 1895 – 13 January 1957) was a British diplomat. He was British Ambassador to Belgium from 1951 to 1955.

Warmer was appointed CMG in 1943, KCMG in 1951, and GBE in 1956.
