= Ballon au poing =

French team sport

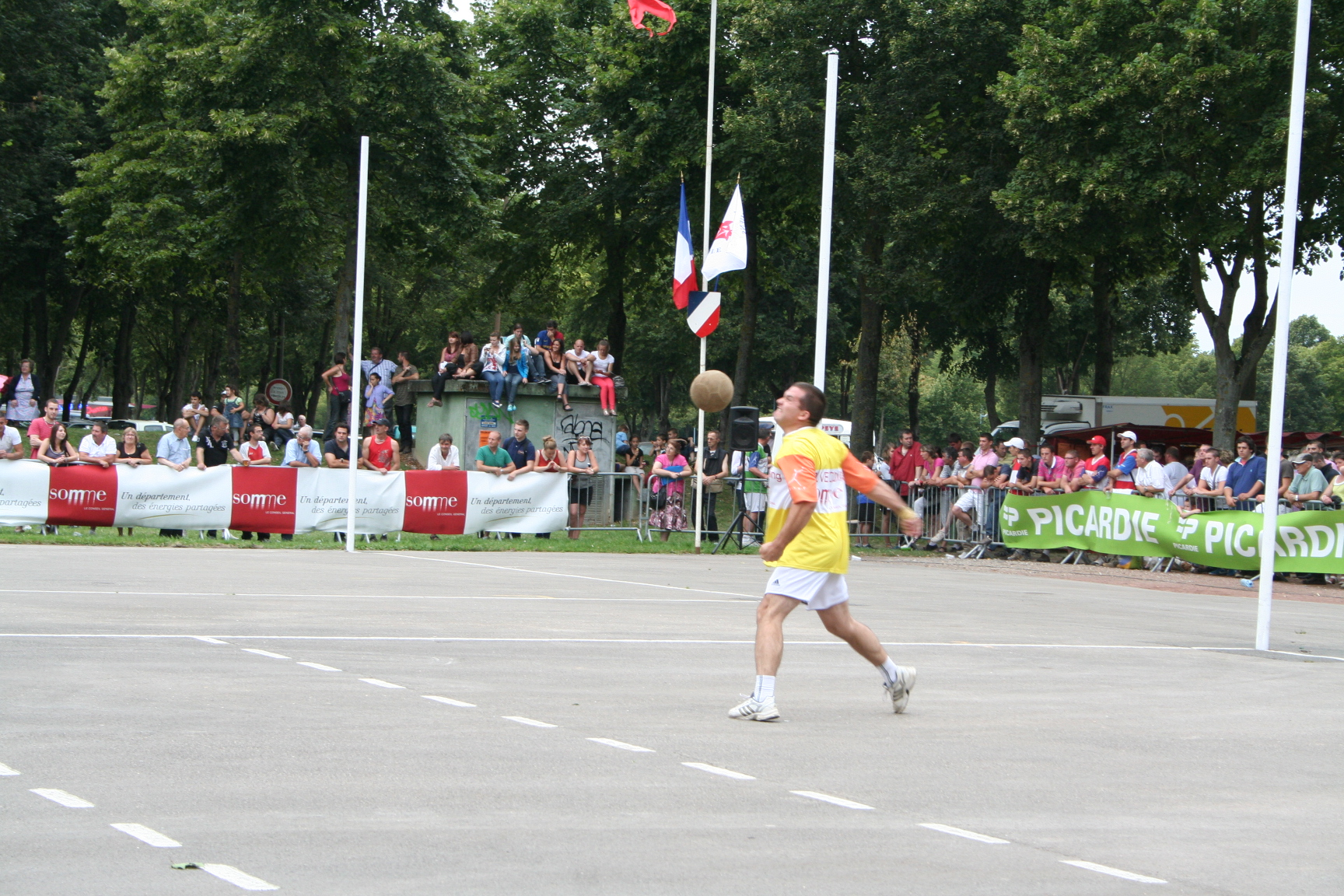
ballon au poing - championnat de France 2012 à Amiens

The ballon au poing is a popular team sport in Picardy (France). This game is played by teams of six. It is a game of gain-ground.

This sport must not be confused with the fistball.

To be able to hit the ball, players surround their hand and their wrist with a strip of canvas or leather.

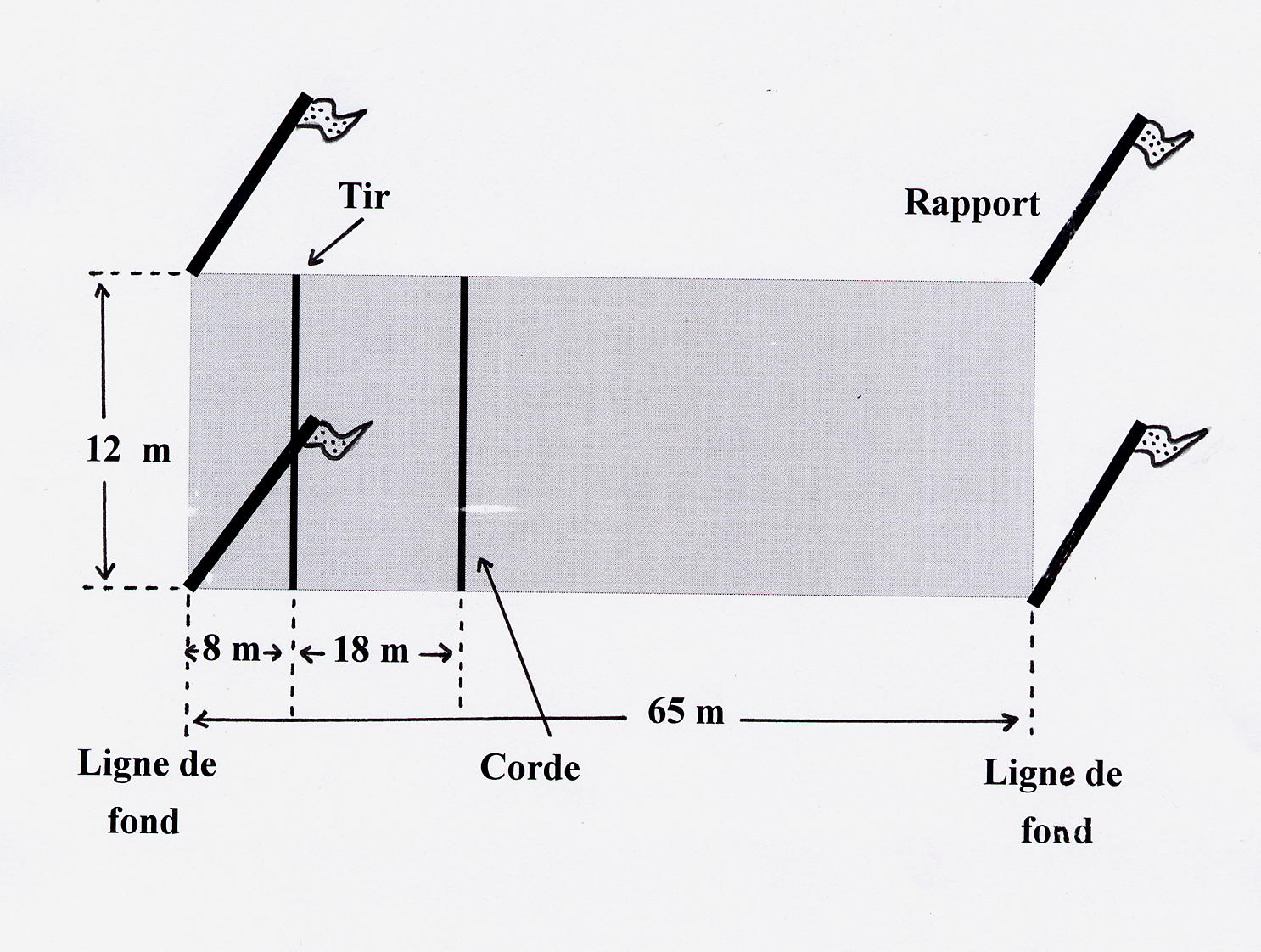
ballodrome

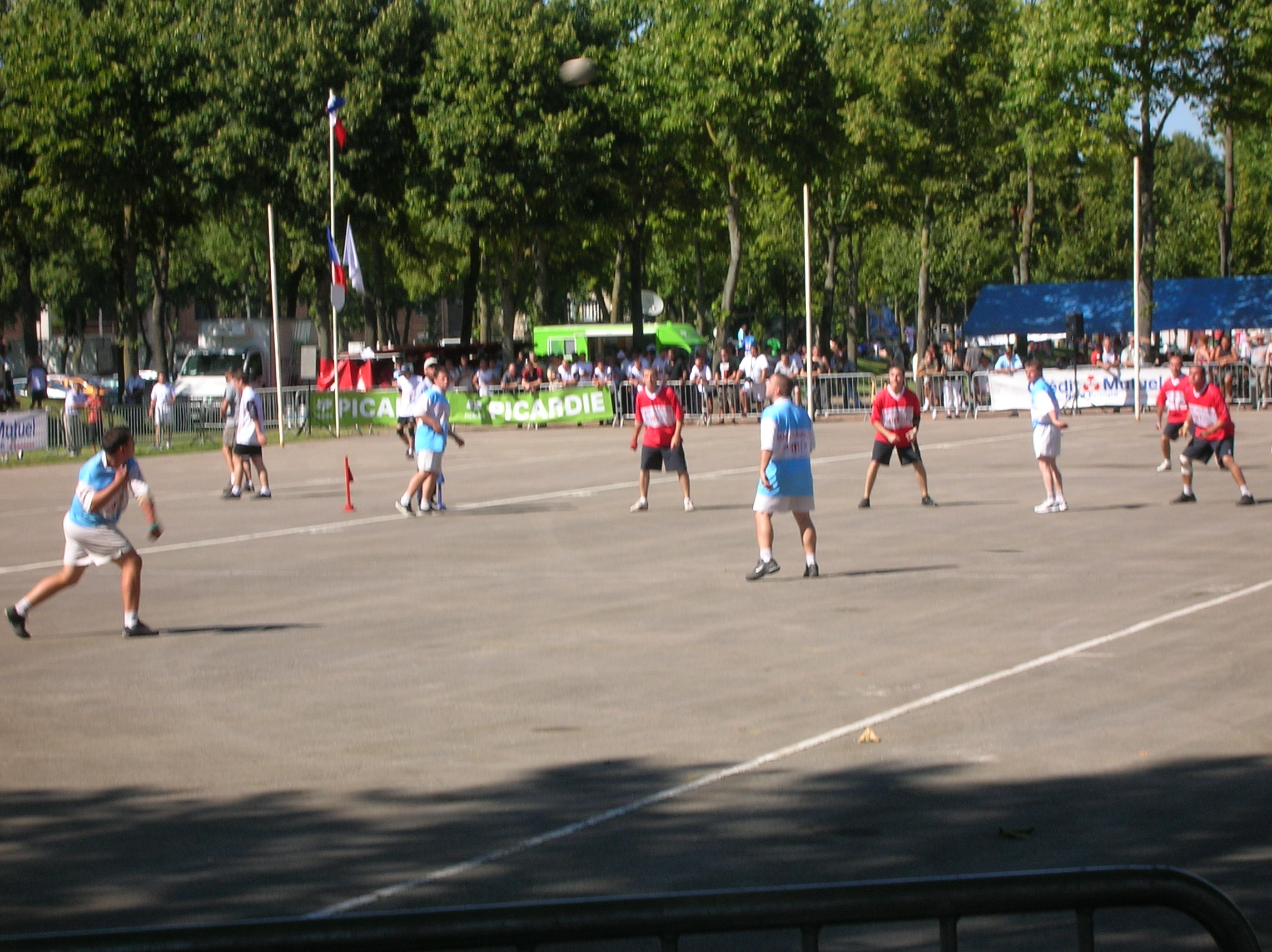
ballon au poing - championnat de France 2009 à Amiens

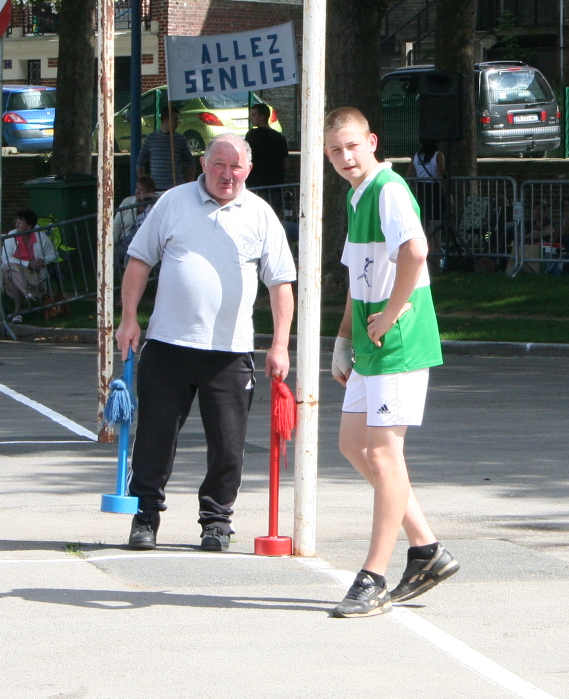
The two chasses (red and blue)

The teams are separated on the ground by a line (la corde - the rope) which is mobile during the party. This new limit is shown by a chasse.

The purpose of the game is to gain ground by moving the rope. To do it, we try to make the ball "die" in the opposite camp.

Points mark by 15, 30, 40 and game.

Each 15 August at the Parc de la Hotoie (Amiens), the city receives the final stages of Ballon au poing.

== See also ==
Others games of gain-ground

- Longue paume
- Jeu de paume
- Balle à la main
- Frisian handball
- Balle pelote
- Balle au tamis
- Llargues
- International game

== Notes ==
- (in French) Luc Collard, Longue paume et ballon au poing, revue EPS, n° 274, p. 72-75, nov-déc 1998
