= Gain-ground =

Type of team sport

Games of gain-ground
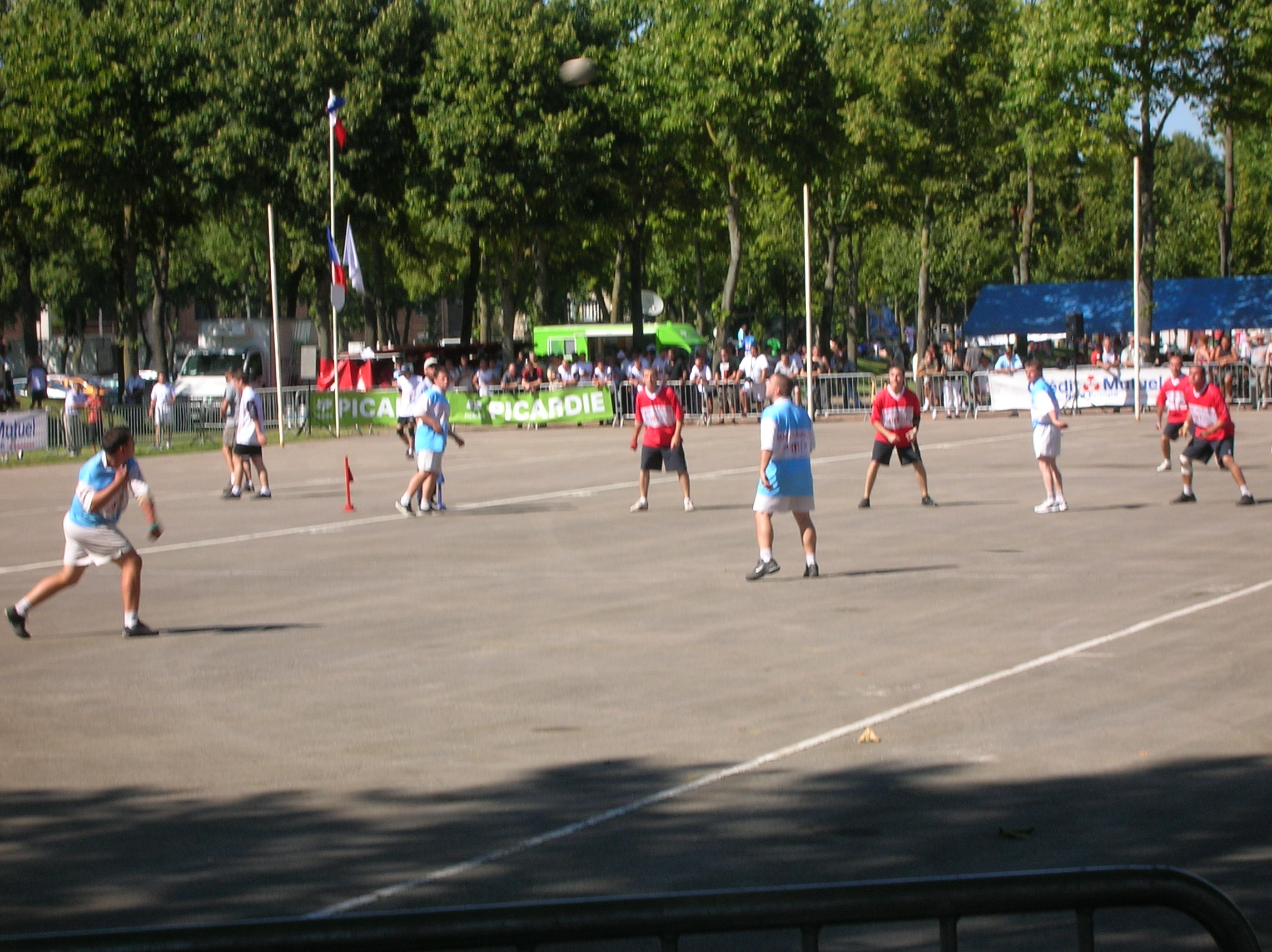
- French championship of Ballon au poing 2009 - Amiens

Characteristics
- Team members: 2 per team - 7 per team

Presence
- Olympic: Longue paume was part of the Paris 1900 Summer Olympics; Real tennis in 1908

Gain-ground games are team sports which are played with a small ball or a balloon. They are often outdoors on a "ballodrome" but can also be played indoors.

Among these games, longue paume and real tennis are the most well-known because they are played with rackets. The rules change a little depending on the game, but the basic rules remain identical from one game to the other.

Games of gain-ground are characterized in particular by the use of "chasses". Chasses indicate the limit between both teams or in real tennis a limit to score a point. Points are counted as in tennis: 15, 30, 40 and set.

== Games of gain-ground ==
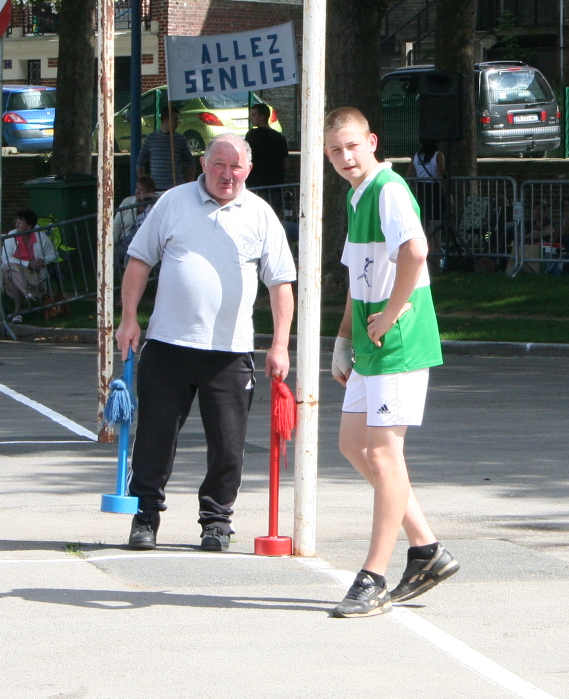
The two chasses (red and blue)

Two games in Jeu de paume:

- Real tennis
- longue paume

These sports are practised in Hauts-de-France and Belgium:

- Ballon au poing
- Balle à la main
- Balle pelote
- Balle au tamis

but also in Spain :

- Llargues, rebot, laxoa

or in the world:

- International game
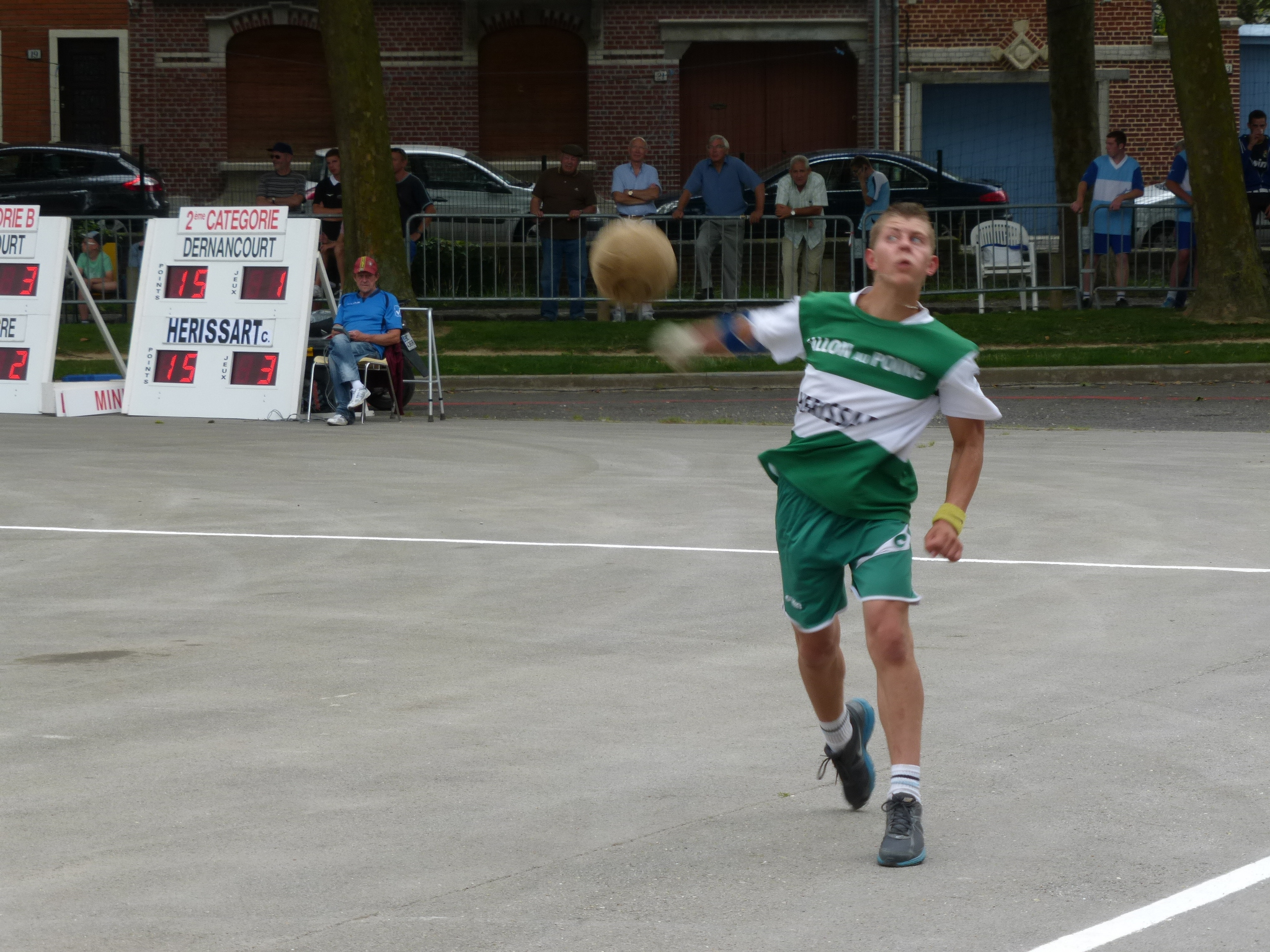
Ballon au poing
Amiens, France

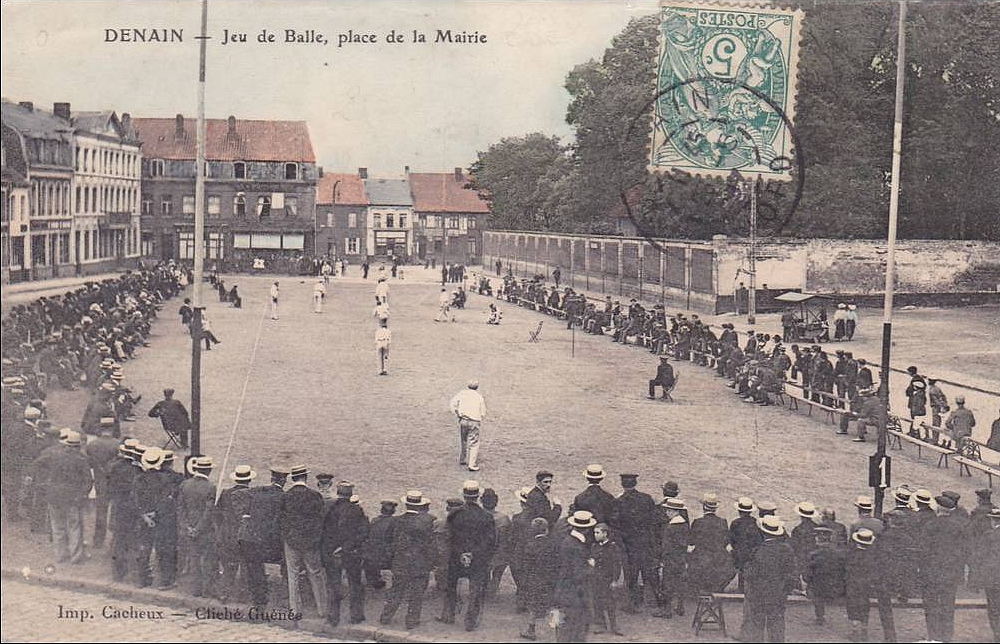
Balle à la main
Denain, France

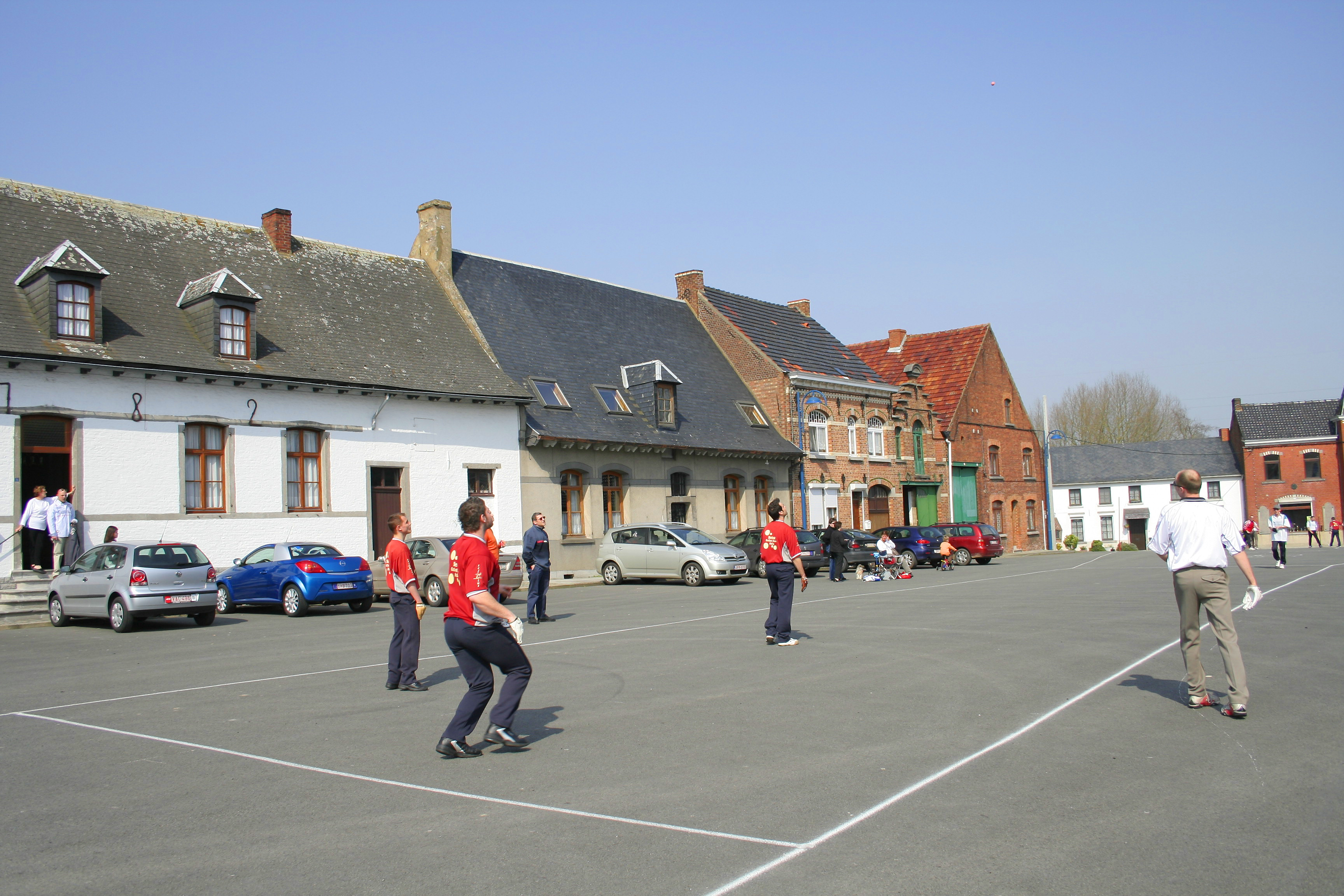
Balle pelote
Silly, Belgium

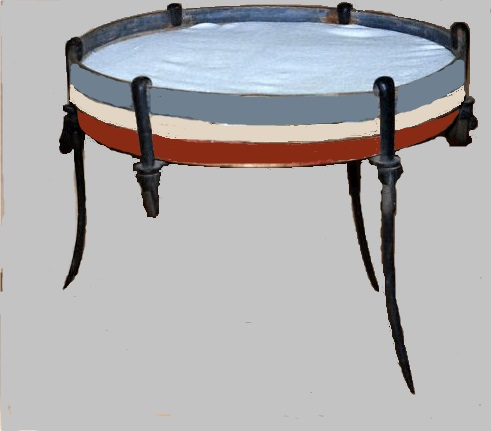
Tamis

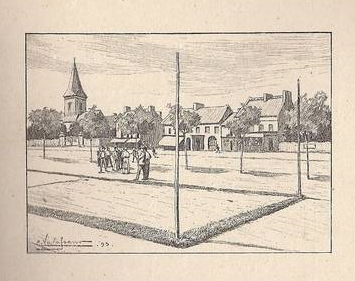
"Ballodrome" (1894)

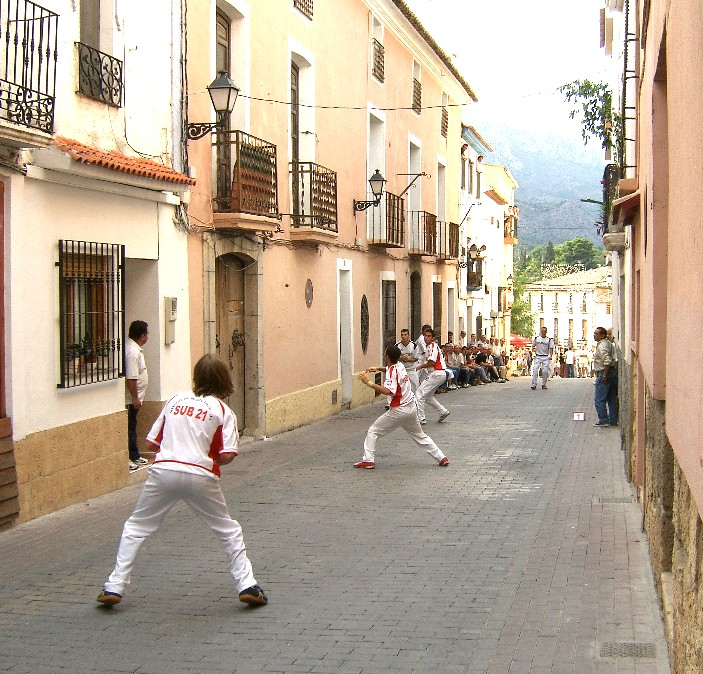
Llargues
Valencian Community, Spain

== Sources ==
- (in French) Benoît Goffin, LA BALLE PELOTE au cœur de notre région, éd. Aparté, Namur, 2006. ISBN 978-2-9303-2715-0.
- (in French) Marcel Lazure, Les jeux de balle et ballon picards: ballon au poing, balle à la main, balle au tamis, longue paume, Centre régional de documentation pédagogique de Picardie, Amiens, France, 1996.
- (in French) Marcel Lazure, Les jeux de balle et ballon picards, Sports de France, Amiens, p. 96., (1981)
- (in French) Luc Collard, Longue paume et ballon au poing, revue EPS, n° 274, p. 72-75, nov-déc 1998
- (in French) H. Civilio, Le jeu de balle en Belgique, Louvain, ( Mémoire en Education physique, Université Catholique de Louvain ), (1966)
