= Longue paume at the 1900 Summer Olympics =

Longue paume was on the Summer Olympic Games programme in 1900. Longue paume has generally not been classified as official, although the IOC has never decided which events were "Olympic" and which were not.
