= Jeu de paume =

Indoor precursor of tennis

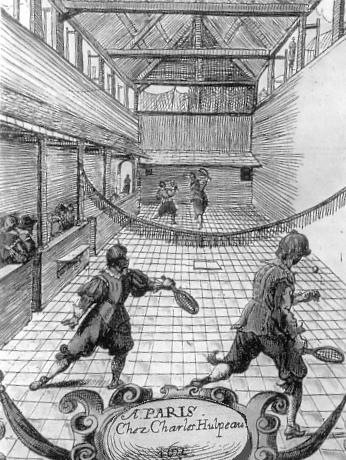
Jeu de paume in the 17th century.

Jeu de paume (UK: /ˌʒɜː də ˈpoʊm/, French: [ʒø d(ə) pom]; originally spelled jeu de paulme; lit. 'palm game') was a ball-and-court game that originated in France and was the precursor of real tennis (called court tennis in the US or courte paume in France) and ultimately of the modern game of tennis. Jeu de paume was played without racquets, and so was a "game of the hand", though these were eventually introduced. It is a former Olympic sport, and has the oldest ongoing annual world championship in sport, first established over 250 years ago. The term also refers to the court on which the game is played and its building, which in the 17th century was sometimes converted into a theatre.

== History ==
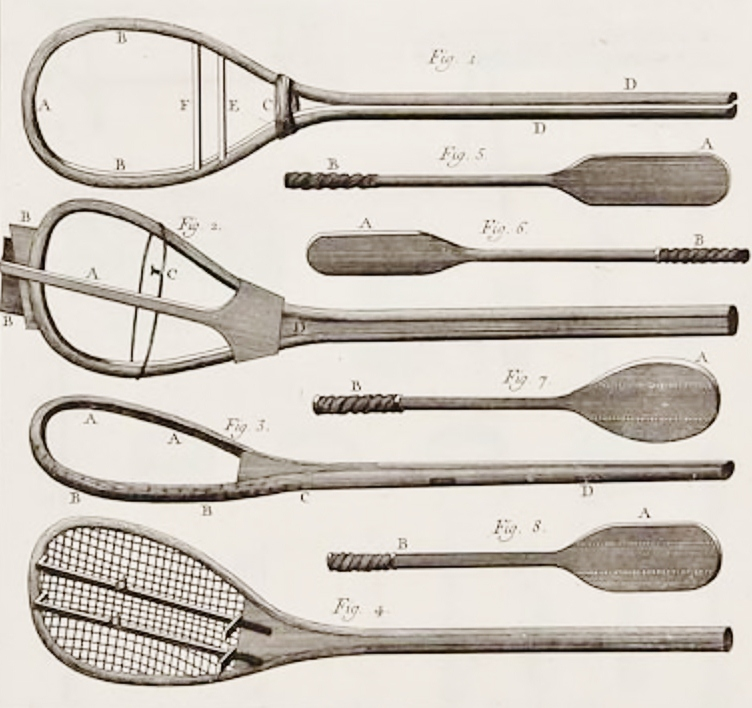
Late 18th-century illustration of jeu de paume paddle-bats or battoirs, and (in various stages of construction) strung racquets.

In the earliest versions of the game, the players hit the ball with their hands, as in palla, volleyball, Fives, or certain varieties of pelota. Jeu de paume, or jeu de paulme, as it was formerly spelled, literally means "palm game". In time, gloves replaced bare hands. Even when paddle-like bats, and finally racquets, became standard equipment for the game by the late 17th century, the name did not change. It became known as "tennis" in English (see History of tennis), and later "real tennis" after the derived game of lawn tennis became the more widely known sport.

The term is used in France today to denote the game of tennis on a court in which the ancient or modern game might be played. The indoor version is sometimes called jeu de courte paume or just courte paume ("short palm") to distinguish it from the outdoor version, longue paume ("long palm"), played on a field of variable length.

=== Olympic ===
At the 1908 Summer Olympics, jeu de paume was a medal event: American Jay Gould II won the gold medal.

=== World Championship ===
Since 1740, jeu de paume has been the subject of an amateur world championship (Real Tennis World Championship), held each year in September. It is the oldest active trophy in international sport.

World Jeu de paume Championship

== Derived sports ==
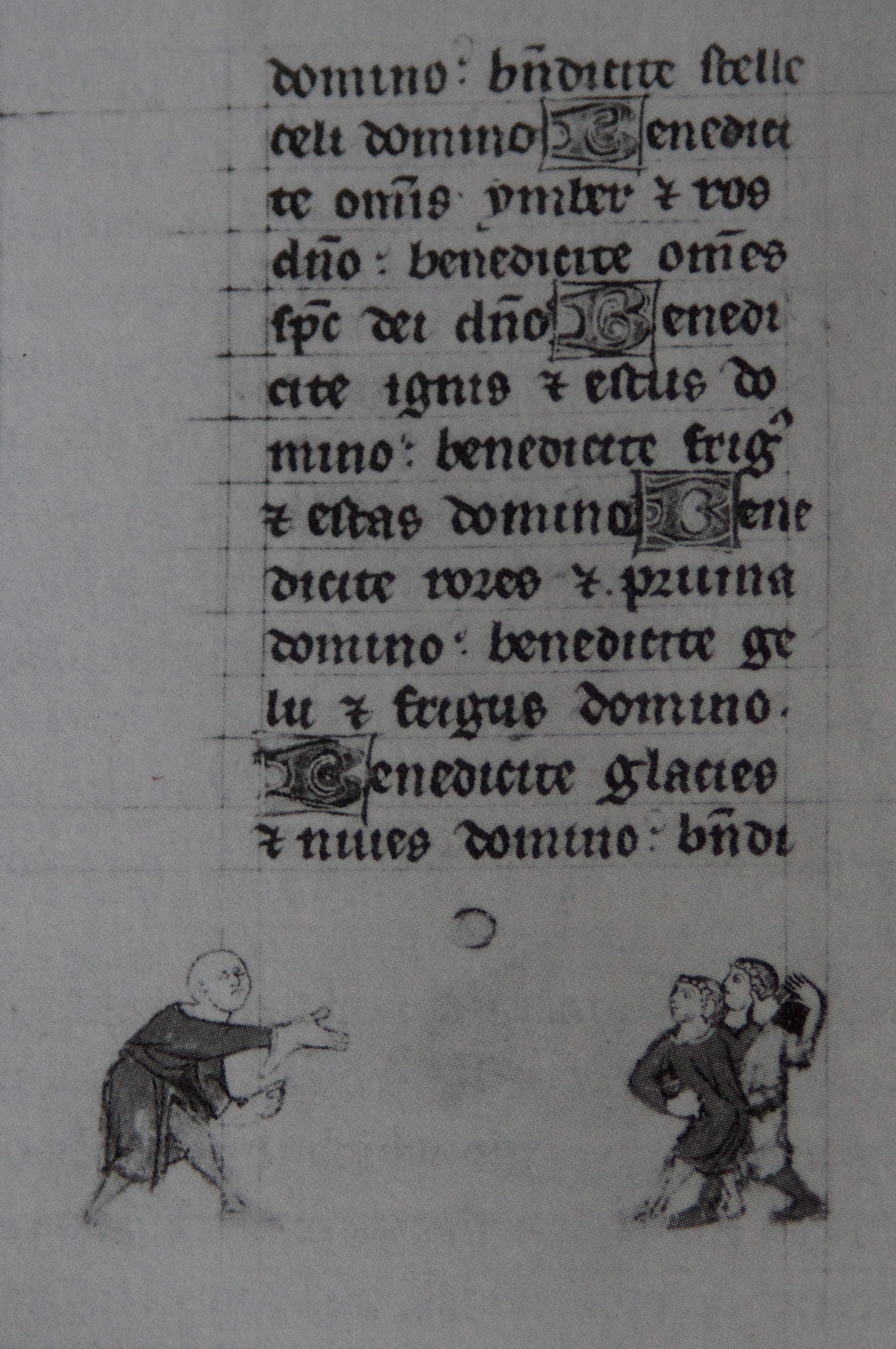
Earliest known picture of Jeu de Paume from a Book of Hours (c. 1300)

=== Hand ===
- Fistball
- Fives
- Frisian handball
- Pallone
- Basque pelota
- Gaelic handball
- Hoodae
- Balle pelote

Various other forms of handball may be related to one degree or another; this is generally difficult to ascertain with certainty, and some, like the Mesoamerican ballgame, clearly have an independent origin.

=== Racquet ===
- Real tennis
- Longue paume (outdoor version of jeu de paume without net)
- Lawn tennis (what is usually meant by the term "tennis" today)

Various other racquet games (squash, badminton, etc.) may be related to one degree or another.

=== Basket ===
- Jai alai, a variation of Basque pelota using a hand-held basket known as a cesta or xistera.

== Cultural references ==
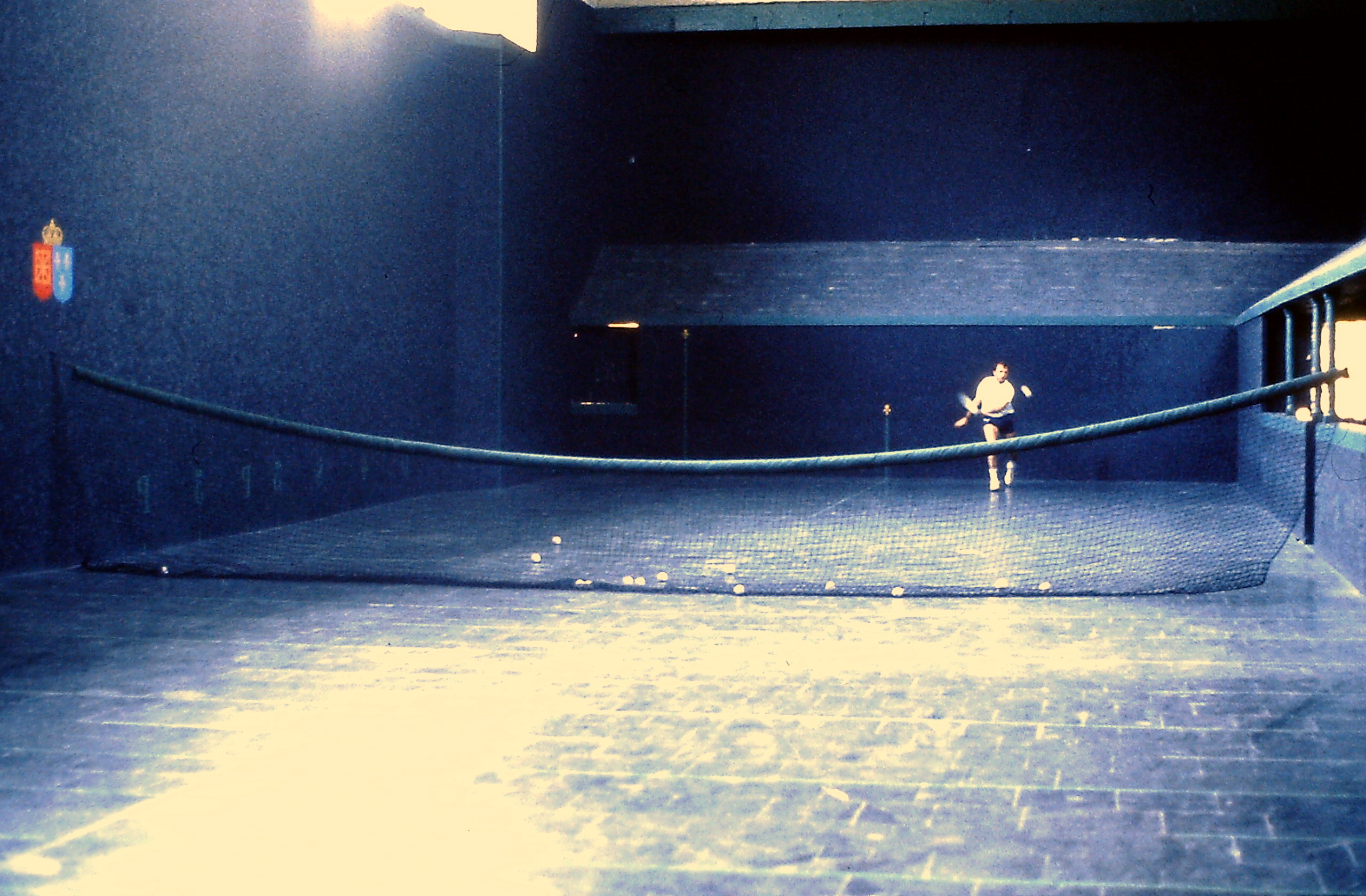
A modernised court in the Palace of Fontainebleau, Fontainebleau (1991).

Étienne Pasquier, a writer and a historian, published an essay regarding jeu de paume in his Recherches; late 16th century. Pasquier was addicted to the sport.

The Galerie nationale du Jeu de Paume, a museum of contemporary art, is housed in a former court on the north side of the Tuileries park in the centre of Paris.

The painter Jacques-Louis David's famous sketch, le Serment du jeu de paume ('the Tennis Court Oath') now hangs in the court of the Palace of Versailles. It depicts a seminal moment of the French Revolution, when, on 20 June 1789, deputies of the Estates-General met at the court and vowed that they would not disband before the proclamation of a formal Constitution for France.

Le Jeu de Paume is a moral ode published in 1791 by André Chénier.

In the 1981 film The French Lieutenant's Woman, socialite Charles Smithson (Jeremy Irons) is seen playing jeu de paume in London.

In the Agatha Christie's Poirot TV series episode "Death in the Clouds", Poirot mentions that tennis, considered an English game, originated in 11th-century France as jeu de paume.

The 2014 Whitney Biennial exhibition featured the premiere of the stop-motion film Jeu de Paume by Joshua Mosley.

== See also ==
- Basque pelota
- Valencian pilota
- Real tennis
- Real Tennis World Championship
- Rackets World Championships
- Padel World Championship
- European Open (real tennis)
- Jeu de paume at the 1908 Summer Olympics
- Grand Slam (real tennis)
- Longue paume
- 2025 FIP calendar
- Wallball (children's game)
- One-wall handball
