= Longue paume =

Sport, ancestor of modern tennis

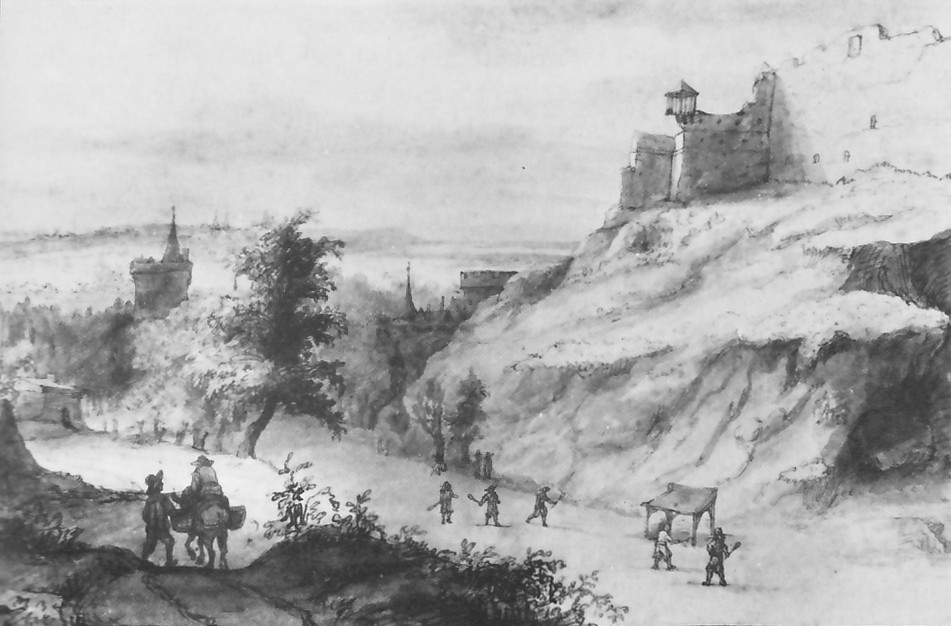
Longue Paume in the 17th century.

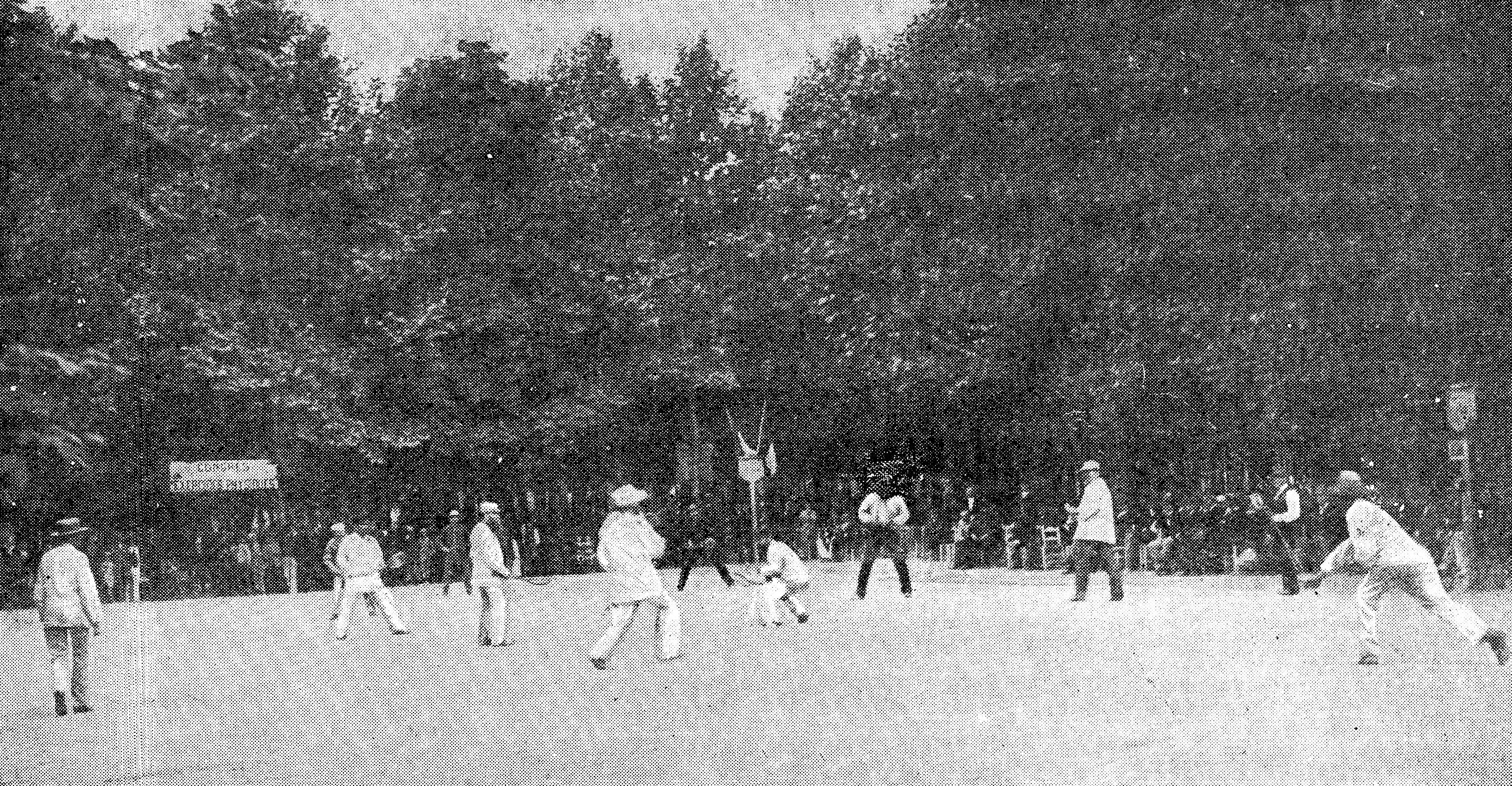
Competition of longue paume in the Garden of the Luxembourg (Paris), on 18 June 1889

Longue paume ([lɔ̃ɡ pom], also jeu de longue paume, "long tennis") is an outdoor version of jeu de paume, an ancestor of modern lawn tennis. It has been popularly played, particularly in France, for several centuries. It is a game of gain-ground as Balle à la main.

It was played as part of the Paris 1900 Summer Olympics, but its medal status is disputed. Today, the sport is most played in the region of Picardy. The sport's governing body is the Fédération Française de Longue Paume, with its headquarters in Amiens.

== Others games of gain-ground ==
- Ballon au poing
- Balle à la main
- Real tennis
- Balle pelote
- Balle au tamis
- Llargues

== See also ==
- Handball International Championships
- International game
