= 2025 FIP calendar =

Padel tour

Tournament information
- Sport: Padel
- Location: Worldwide
- Dates: January 2025–December 2025

The 2025 FIP calendar refers to the main global professional padel tour for the year 2025 organized by the International Padel Federation (FIP). Since January 2025, the Tour comprises two tiers: Premier Padel (Major, P1 and P2) and Cupra FIP Tour (Platinum, Gold, Silver and Bronze). The season ends in December with Tour Finals featuring the best pairs in the world.

Premier Padel circuit was established by FIP in early 2022 with the financial support of Qatar Sports Investments and backed by Professional Padel Players Association (PPA). In August 2023, QSI acquired rival padel tour World Padel Tour to Damm, thus becoming the main global padel tour.

== Schedule ==
Key

World Championships
Tour Finals
Premier Padel (Major, P1 & P2)
Cupra FIP Tour (Platinum)
Cupra FIP Tour (Gold)
Cupra FIP Tour (Silver)
Cupra FIP Tour (Bronze)

=== January ===
Tournament	Men's winners	Men's runners-up	Women's winners	Women's runners-up
FIP Silver Australian Open; Sydney, Australia; AU$30,000; 3–5 January 2025	Joel Olivera (ESP); Guillem Figuerola (ESP); 6–3, 7–5	Pablo Pastor (ESP); Sergio Esteban (ESP)	Aimee Gibson (GBR); Catherine Rose (GBR); 6–3, 6–3	Carla Fernández (ESP); Nerea Guerra (ESP)
FIP Bronze Torchio PadelShot; Mondeville, France €8,000; 9–12 January 2025	Diego García (ESP); Javi Núñez (ESP); 6–1, 7–6^{5}	Marcos Córdoba (ESP); Pepe Aliaga (ESP)	Natividad López (ESP); Aida Martínez (ESP); 7–5, 7–6^{5}	Aitana García (ESP); Claudia Escacena (ESP)
FIP Silver Melbourne Game4Padel Open; Melbourne, Australia; AU$25,000; 10–12 January 2025	Roberto Belmont (ESP); Víctor Tur (ESP); 6–4, 7–5	Joel Olivera (ESP); Guillem Figuerola (ESP)	Aimee Gibson (GBR); Catherine Rose (GBR); 6–3, 6–2	Marcella Koek (NED); Bo Luttikhuis (NED)
FIP Bronze La Cala; Finestrat, Spain €7,000; 24–26 January 2025	Nacho Moragues (ESP); Marc Sintes (ESP); 6–4, 3–6, 6–4	Álvaro Cepero (ESP); Agustín Torre (ARG)	Carmen Castillón (ESP); Emily Stellato (ITA); 6–2, 5–7, 7–5	Ariadna Cañellas (ESP); Lucía Peralta (ESP)
FIP Bronze San Antonio; San Antonio, Chile €6,000; 24–26 January 2025	Matías del Moral (ARG); Juan Manuel Romanazzi (ARG); 6–2, 7–6	Pablo Molina (ARG); Cristóbal Martínez (CHL)	No women's draw	
FIP Bronze Qatar; Doha, Qatar €7,000; 31 Jan.–2 Feb. 2025	Curro Cabeza (ESP); Santi Pineda (ESP); 6–1, 1–6, 7–6	Marco Cassetta (ITA); Jose Luis González (ESP)	Laura Luján (ESP); Claudia Escacena (ESP); 3–6, 6–3, 6–4	Aimee Gibson (GBR); Catherine Rose (GBR)

=== February ===
Tournament	Men's winners	Men's runners-up	Women's winners	Women's runners-up
FIP Silver Rio Grande; Rio Grande, Brazil €7,500; 14–16 February 2025	Santiago Rolla (ARG); Facundo López (ARG); 5–7, 6–2, 6–3	Maxi Sánchez (ARG); Felipe Calleja (ARG)	No women's draw	
FIP Bronze Rio Grande; Rio Grande, Brazil €3,500; 14–16 February 2025	No men's draw		Patrícia Ribeiro (POR); Amanda López (ESP); 6–1, 6–4	Catarina Santos (POR); Camila Ramme (MEX)
Premier Padel P1 Riyadh; Riyadh, Saudi Arabia €470,000; 10–17 February 2025	Arturo Coello (ESP); Agustín Tapia (ARG); 6–3, 5–7, 6–3	Franco Stupaczuk (ARG); Juan Lebrón (ESP)	Ariana Sánchez (ESP); Paula Josemaría (ESP) w/o	Claudia Fernández (ESP); Beatriz González (ESP)
FIP Gold Paredes; Paredes, Portugal €50,000; 20–23 February 2025	Gonzalo Alfonso (ARG); Leonel Aguirre (ARG); 3–6, 6–2, 6–3	Miguel Deus (POR); Nuno Deus (POR)	Sara Ruiz (ESP); Giorgia Marchetti (ITA); 4–6, 6–4, 6–3	Lucía Martínez (ESP); Julieta Bidahorria (ARG)
FIP Silver Valencia; Valencia, Spain €15,000; 21–23 February 2025	Boris Castro (ESP); Enzo Jensen (ITA); 7–5, 6–1	Christian Fuster (ESP); Adrián Naranjo (ESP)	Nuria Rodríguez (ESP); Carolina Orsi (ITA); 6–4, 6–4	Jimena Velasco (ESP); Noa Cánovas (ESP)
FIP Bronze Sweden I Bon Padel; Gothenburg, Swedeb €7,000; 21–23 February 2025	Simon Vasquez (SWE); Adam Axelsson (SWE); 6–2, 6–3	Adrià Mercadal (ESP); Guillem Figuerola (ESP)	Ana Domínguez (ESP); Carla Touly (FRA); 6–4, 6–2	Lucía García (ESP); Camila Fassio (ESP)
FIP Silver Egypt I Wadi El Natrun, Egypt €7,500; 21–23 February 2025	Marco Cassetta (ITA); Jose Luis González (ESP); 6–1, 2–1^{rtd.}	Thijs Roper (NED); Youp de Kroon (NED)	No women's draw	
FIP Bronze Egypt I Wadi El Natrun, Egypt €3,500; 21–23 February 2025	No men's draw		Patricia Martínez (ESP); Letizia Manquillo (ESP); 6–0, 7–6	María Portillo (ESP); Elena de la Rosa (ESP)
Premier Padel P2 Gijón; Gijón, Spain €252,250; 26 Feb.–2 Mar. 2025	Curro Cabeza (ESP); Diego García (ESP); 7–5, 4–6, 6–3	Gonzalo Alfonso (ARG); Leonel Aguirre (ARG)	Gemma Triay (ESP); Delfina Brea (ARG); 0–6, 6–1, 6–4	Ariana Sánchez (ESP); Paula Josemaría (ESP)
FIP Gold DAMAC Dubai; Dubai, United Arab Emirates €50,000; 27 Feb.–2 Mar. 2025	Simon Vasquez (SWE); Adam Axelsson (SWE); 7–5, 6–4	Guillem Figuerola (ESP); Maxime Joris (FRA)	Esther Carnicero (ESP); Bárbara Las Heras (ESP); 7–6^{1}, 6–3	Laura Luján (ESP); Marta Arellano (ESP)
FIP Silver Egypt II; Wadi El Natrun, Egypt €7,500; 28 Feb.–2 Mar. 2025	Marco Cassetta (ITA); Jose Luis González (ESP); 6–4, 6–4	Flavio Abbate (ITA); Giulio Graziotti (ITA)	No women's draw	
FIP Bronze Egypt II; Wadi El Natrun, Egypt €3,500; 1–2 March 2025	No men's draw		Lucía García (ESP); Camila Fassio (ESP); 7–6^{3}, 7–6^{4}	Lucía Micaela (ESP); Teresa Moríñigo (ESP)

=== March ===
Tournament	Men's winners	Men's runners-up	Women's winners	Women's runners-up
FIP Platinum Mexico; Puebla, Mexico €120,000; 4–8 March 2025	Gonzalo Alfonso (ARG); Leonel Aguirre (ARG); 4–6, 6–2, 5–3^{rtd.}	Alonso Rodríguez (ESP); Juani Rubini (ARG)	Andrea Ustero (ESP); Alejandra Alonso (ESP); 6–4, 6–0	Noa Cánovas (ESP); Jimena Velasco (ESP)
FIP Silver Ponta Delgada; Ponta Delgada, Portugal €30,000; 7–9 March 2025	Nacho Moragues (ESP); Marc Sintes (ESP); 6–2, 6–3	Agustín Reca (GER); Álvaro López (ESP)	Ana Catarina Nogueira (POR); Martina Fassio (ARG); 7–5, 6–4	Laia Rodríguez (ESP); Raquel Eugenio (ESP)
FIP Bronze Sportclub Houten; Houten, Netherlands €10,000; 7–9 March 2025	Ferrán Insa (ESP); Rodrigo Coello (ESP); 6–2, 6–4	Bastien Blanqué (FRA); Johan Bergeron (FRA)	Patricia Martínez (ESP); Letizia Manquillo (ESP); 6–1, 6–1	Alba Gallardo (ESP); Anna Ortiz (ESP)
Premier Padel P2 Cancún; Isla Mujeres, Mexico €252,250; 11–16 March 2025	Franco Stupaczuk (ARG); Juan Lebrón (ESP); 6–2, 6–3	Gonzalo Alfonso (ARG); Leonel Aguirre (ARG)	Gemma Triay (ESP); Delfina Brea (ARG); 6–3, 6–1	Marta Ortega (ESP); Sofia Araújo (POR)
FIP Bronze Hong Kong; Ma On Shan, Hong Kong €10,000; 14–16 March 2025	Bastien Blanqué (FRA); Johan Bergeron (FRA); 6–4, 7–5	Daniele Cattaneo (ITA); Héctor Vázquez (ESP)	Ana Varo (ESP); Alba Pérez (ESP); 6–1, 3–0^{rtd.}	Lucía Pérez (ESP); Eugènia Guimet (ESP)
FIP Bronze Kaunas; Kaunas, Lithuania €7,000; 14–16 March 2025	Jose Luis González (ESP); Marco Cassetta (ITA); 7–6^{8}, 6–2	Pablo Castillo (ESP); Cándido Alfaro (ESP)	Xènia Clascà (ESP); Nuria Vivancos (ESP); 6–2, 6–3	Ana Domínguez (ESP); Carla Touly (FRA)
Premier Padel P1 Motorola Razr Miami; Miami, United States €474,500; 18–23 March 2025	Alejandro Galán (ESP); Federico Chingotto (ARG); 6–1, 7–6^{3}	Franco Stupaczuk (ARG); Juan Lebrón (ESP)	Gemma Triay (ESP); Delfina Brea (ARG); 2–6, 6–1, 6–4	Ariana Sánchez (ESP); Paula Josemaría (ESP)
FIP Bronze Manila; Manila, Philippines €7,000; 21–23 March 2025	Bastien Blanqué (FRA); Johan Bergeron (FRA); 6–2, 7–6^{7–5}	Josep Aymerich (ESP); Albert Trillas (ESP)	Sara Pujals (ESP); Karin Hechenberger (SUI); 7–5, 6–2	Carla Fernández (ESP); Nerea Guerra (ESP)
Premier Padel P1 Santiago; Santiago, Chile €474,500; 25–30 March 2025	Alejandro Galán (ESP); Federico Chingotto (ARG) w/o	Franco Stupaczuk (ARG); Juan Lebrón (ESP)	Women's final delayed to Monday 31 March due to adverse weather, with the match ultimately being suspended at 3rd set.	

=== April ===
Tournament	Men's winners	Men's runners-up	Women's winners	Women's runners-up
FIP Silver Caltanissetta; Caltanissetta, Italy €15,000; 4–6 April 2025	Andrés Fernández (ESP); Enzo Jensen (ITA); 6–2, 6–4	Álvaro Montiel (ITA); Flavio Abbate (ITA)	Marta Barrera (ESP); Marta Caparrós (ESP); 6–4, 6–4	Julia Polo (ESP); Jana Montes (ESP)
FIP Silver Curitiba; Curitiba, Brazil €7,500; 4–6 April 2025	Facundo Domínguez (ITA); Juani Rubini (ARG); 6–2, 7–6	Matheus Simonato (BRA); Lucas Cunha (BRA)	No women's draw	
FIP Bronze Curitiba; Curitiba, Brazil €3,500; 4–6 April 2025	No men's draw		Camila Ramme (MEX); Catarina Santos (POR); 6–2, 6–1	Rosalie van der Hoek (NED); Camille Sireix (FRA)
FIP Silver Metepec; Metepec, Mexico €30,000; 10–12 April 2025	Pablo Padilla (MEX); Alberto Gª Trabanco (ESP); 7–6, 6–4	Bastien Blanqué (FRA); Johan Bergeron (FRA)	Camila Ramme (MEX); Catarina Santos (POR); 6–1, 7–5	Carla Serrano (ESP); Carla Fitó (ESP)
FIP Bronze Bahrain; Manama, Bahrain €8,500; 10–12 April 2025	Pincho Fernández (ESP); Federico Mouriño (ARG); 6–4, 7–6^{4}	Miguel Benítez (ESP); Javier Martínez (ESP)	Esther Carnicero (ESP); Bárbara Las Heras (ESP); 6–0, 6–2	María Portillo (ESP); Dóra Andrejszki (HUN)
FIP Silver DAMAC Dubai; Dubai, United Arab Emirates €30,000; 10–13 April 2025	Miguel Deus (POR); Nuno Deus (POR); 6–3, 6–2	Gonzalo Rubio (ESP); Pablo Lijó (ESP)	Ksenija Sharifova (AIN); Marta Talaván (ESP); 7–5, 6–3	Patricia Martínez (ESP); Letizia Manquillo (ESP)
FIP Silver Mediolanum Padel Cup; Rome, Italy €20,000; 10–13 April 2025	Javier Barahona (ESP); Javi García (ESP); 6–3, 7–5	José David Sánchez (ESP); Coquito Zamora (ESP)	Lucía García (ESP); Amanda López (ESP); 6–1, 6–4	Chiara Pappacena (ITA); Giulia Sussarello (ITA)
FIP Silver R3 Bullpadel Cup; Bristol, Great Britain €18,000; 11–13 April 2025	Álvaro Montiel (ITA); Flavio Abbate (ITA); 6–4, 6–2	Christian Fuster (ESP); Adrián Naranjo (ESP)	Mónica Gómez (ESP); Camila Fassio (ESP); 6–2, 6–3	Lorena Vano (ITA); Emily Stellato (ITA)
FIP Bronze Setúbal; Setúbal, Portugal €10,000; 11–13 April 2025	Pablo Castillo (ESP); Cándido Alfaro (ESP); 6–4, 1–6, 6–3	Jorge Ruiz (ESP); Miguel Oliveira (POR)	Paula Ferrán (ESP); Clarinha Santos (POR); 6–2, 7–6^{2}	Ares Llobera (ESP); Maite Cano (ESP)
FIP Silver Santa Maria; Santa Maria, Brazil €7,500; 11–13 April 2025	Maxi Sánchez (ARG); Felipe Calleja (ARG); 4–6, 6–3, 7–6^{4}	Manuel Gayone (ARG); Axel Guevara (ARG)	No women's draw	
FIP Bronze Gatorade ESC Padel Finland; Espoo, Finland €7,000; 11–13 April 2025	Álvaro Cepero (ESP); Agustín Torre (ARG); 5–7, 7–6^{3}, 7–6^{4}	Afonso Fazendeiro (POR); Pedro Perry (POR)	Ainara Pozuelo (ESP); Ana Sánchez (ESP); 6–3, 6–2	Aitana García (ESP); Natalia Molinilla (ESP)
FIP Bronze Santa Maria; Santa Maria, Brazil €3,500; 11–13 April 2025	No men's draw		Alessandra de Barros (BRA); Cristina Cirne (BRA); 6–1, 1–6, 7–5	Rosalie van der Hoek (NED); Camille Sireix (FRA)
Premier Padel Qatar Major; Doha, Qatar €525,000; 14–19 April 2025	Arturo Coello (ESP); Agustín Tapia (ARG); 7–6^{4}, 6–2	Federico Chingotto (ARG); Alejandro Galán (ESP)	Gemma Triay (ESP); Delfina Brea (ARG); 6–4, 6–4	Ariana Sánchez (ESP); Paula Josemaría (ESP)
FIP Silver Cyprus I Ayia Napa, Cyprus €15,000; 18–20 April 2025	Nico Suescun (ITA); Manu Castaño (ESP); 1–6, 6–4, 6–3	Álvaro Montiel (ITA); Flavio Abbate (ITA)	Lorena Vano (ITA); Emily Stellato (ITA); 6–4, 6–2	Mónica Gómez (ESP); Camila Fassio (ESP)
FIP Bronze Nola; Nola, Italy €10,000; 18–20 April 2025	Ferrán Insa (ESP); Roger Aromí (ESP); 5–7, 7–6^{4}, 6–2	Andrés Fernández (ESP); Enzo Jensen (ITA)	Anna Ortiz (ESP); Giulia Dal Pozzo (ITA); 6–2, 6–0	Sandra Oliveras (ESP); Cayetana Sánchez (ESP)
FIP Bronze Kuala Lumpur; Kuala Lumpur, Malaysia €7,000; 18–20 April 2025	Julien Seurin (FRA); Albert Trillas (ESP); 6–4, 6–7, 6–3	Sergi Nogueras (ESP); Marc Bernils (ESP)	Lisa Phillips (GBR); Abigail Tordoff (GBR); 6–1, 6–4	Lucía Micaela (ESP); Anastasiia Ryzhova (AIN)
FIP Bronze South Africa; Johannesburg, South Africa €7,000; 18–20 April 2025	Miguel Oliveira (POR); Willy Lahoz (ESP); 6–3, 6–4	Jan Masferrer (ESP); Albert Roglán (ESP)	No women's draw	
FIP Bronze Betsson Sweden II; Gothenburg, Sweden €3,500; 18–20 April 2025	Pepe Aliaga (ESP); Diego Dorta (ESP); 6–4, 7–6	Diogo Jesus (POR); Pedro Graça (POR)	Baharak Soleymani (SWE); Maria Rasmussen (DEN); 7–6, 6–2	Patrícia Ribeiro (POR); Catarina Santos (POR)
Premier Padel P2 Brussels; Brussels, Belgium €252,250; 22–27 April 2025	Arturo Coello (ESP); Agustín Tapia (ARG); 2–6, 6–4, 6–1	Federico Chingotto (ARG); Alejandro Galán (ESP)	Paula Josemaría (ESP); Ariana Sánchez (ESP); 6–2, 6–4	Gemma Triay (ESP); Delfina Brea (ARG)
FIP Silver Leiria Master Padel; Leiria, Portugal €30,000; 24–27 April 2025	Josete Rico (ESP); Agustín Gutiérrez (ARG); 6–3, 7–5	Miguel Deus (POR); Nuno Deus (POR)	Ana Catarina Nogueira (POR); Martina Fassio (ARG); 6–4, 7–6^{5}	Marta Barrera (ESP); Marta Caparrós (ESP)
FIP Silver Egypt III; Cairo, Egypt €7,500; 25–27 April 2025	Álvaro Meléndez (ESP); Jose Luis González (ESP); 6–3, 6–0	Denis Perino (ITA); Mario Huete (ESP)	No women's draw	
FIP Bronze Hong Kong II; Sai Kung Town, Hong Kong €7,000; 25–27 April 2025	Christian Medina (GBR); Alberto Gª Jiménez (ESP); 6–4, 6–4	Miki Solbes (ESP); Gustavo Nunes (POR)	Camila Ramme (MEX); Ana María Cabrejas (MEX); 7–6, 6–0	Ainize Santamaría (ESP); Angelina Neizvestnaya (AIN)
FIP Bronze Cyprus I Ayia Napa, Cyprus €7,000; 25–27 April 2025	Flavio Abbate (ITA); Álvaro Montiel (ITA); 6–2, 7–5	Giulio Graziotti (ITA); Marcos Córdoba (ESP)	Lucía García (ESP); Natividad López (ESP); 6–2, 6–2	Maaike Betz (NED); Victoria Kurz (GER)
FIP Bronze Concepción II; Concepción, Chile €7,000; 25–27 April 2025	Fran Britos (ARG); Nico Egea (ARG); 6–4, 6–4	Simone Cremona (ITA); Matteo Platania (ITA)	No women's draw	
FIP Bronze Egypt III; Cairo, Egypt €3,500; 25–27 April 2025	No men's draw		Clarissa Aima (ITA); Giorgia Rosi (ITA); 6–4, 6–2	Manuela Schuck (BRA); Karin Hechenberger (SUI)

=== May ===
Tournament	Men's winners	Men's runners-up	Women's winners	Women's runners-up
FIP Silver BMW Marmotor 25º Anniv. Cl. La Calzada; Las Palmas, Spain €15,000; 2–4 May 2025	Javier Barahona (ESP); Javi García (ESP); 6–2, 6–2	Iñigo Jofre (UAE); Luis Hernández (ESP)	Melani Merino (ESP); Águeda Pérez (ESP); 6–2, 6–4	Julieta Bidahorria (ARG); Lara Arruabarrena (ESP)
FIP Bronze San Juan de Alicante; Sant Joan d'Alacant, Spain €7,000; 2–4 May 2025	Andrés Fernández (ESP); Enzo Jensen (ITA); 3–6, 6–3, 7–6^{7}	Carlos Martí (ESP); Mario Ortega (ESP)	Sandra Bellver (ESP); Jana Montes (ESP); 6–3, 6–3	Xènia Clascà (ESP); Nuria Vivancos (ESP)
FIP Silver Vila Real de Santo António; Vila Real de Santo António, Portugal €15,000; 8–11 May 2025	Javier Barahona (ESP); Javi García (ESP); 6–4, 6–3	Juanlu Esbrí (ESP); Pol Hernández (ESP)	Marina Guinart (ESP); Victoria Iglesias (ESP); 6–3, 6–2	Sara Ruiz (ESP); Carla Mesa (ESP)
FIP Bronze Antalya; Antalya, Turkey €7,000; 9–11 May 2025	Ferrán Insa (ESP); Alejandro Jerez (ESP); 7–6, 6–4	Dylan Guichard (FRA); Dylan Cuello (ARG)	Patricia Martínez (ESP); Letizia Manquillo (ESP); 7–5, 6–1	Emily Stellato (ITA); Carolina Petrelli (ITA)
FIP Bronze Agrigento; Agrigento, Italy €7,000; 9–11 May 2025	Pincho Fernández (ESP); Federico Mouriño (ARG); 6–3, 6–0	Simone Cremona (ITA); Manuel Aragón (ESP)	Sandra Bellver (ESP); Léa Godallier (FRA); 6–4, 6–1	Ana Domínguez (ESP); Giulia Dal Pozzo (ITA)
FIP Bronze Mendoza; Mendoza, Argentina €5,000; 9–11 May 2025	Renzo Núñez (ARG); Kevin Kviatkovski (ARG); 2–6, 6–3, 6–3	Maxi Sánchez (ARG); Federico Chiostri (ARG)	No women's draw	
FIP Bronze Kazakhstan; Almaty, Kazakhstan €3,500; 9–11 May 2025	Nacho Vilariño (ESP); Jaime Muñoz (ESP); 6–7, 6–4, 6–4	Thomas Leygue (FRA); Daniel Windahl (SWE)	No women's draw	
FIP Bronze DAMAC Abu Dhabi; Abu Dhabi, United Arab Emirates €10,000; 15–18 May 2025	Youssef Hossam (EGY); Julián Lacamoire (ARG); 6–3, 7–5	Sergio Icardo (UAE); Fran Jurado (UAE)	Aitana García (ESP); Carla Serrano (ESP); 6–3, 1–6, 7–5	Carolina Navarro (SWE); Carmen Castillón (ESP)
FIP Bronze Ayia Napa Protaras Cyprus; Ayia Napa, Cyprus €7,000; 15–18 May 2025	Nico Suescun (ITA); Manu Castaño (ESP); 7–5, 3–6, 6–3	Flavio Abbate (ITA); Álvaro Montiel (ITA)	Mónica Gómez (ESP); Camila Fassio (ESP); 6–1, 6–4	Ariadna Cañellas (ESP); Alicia Cañellas (ESP)
FIP Silver Open Dezhou China; Dezhou, China €15,000; 16–18 May 2025	Jose Luis González (ESP); Marco Cassetta (ITA); 6–3, 6–4	Pepe Aliaga (ESP); Diego Dorta (ESP)	Ana Varo (ESP); Alba Pérez (ESP); 6–2, 6–3	Victoria Kurz (GER); Dóra Andrejszki (HUN)
FIP Silver Andalucía Alcalá de Guadaíra; Alcalá de Guadaíra, Spain €15,000; 16–18 May 2025	Javier Barahona (ESP); Javi García (ESP); 7–5^{rtd.}	Salva Oria (ESP); Nacho Vilariño (ESP)	Jimena Velasco (ESP); Noa Cánovas (ESP); 6–3, 1–6, 6–4	Lucía Martínez (ESP); Marta Marrero (ESP)
FIP Bronze Abidjan; Abidjan, Ivory Coast €10,000; 16–18 May 2025	Boris Castro (ESP); Pedro Araújo (POR); 6–2, 6–4	Giulio Graziotti (ITA); Simone Iacovino (ITA)	No women's draw	
FIP Bronze Viña del Mar III; Viña del Mar, Chile €5,000; 16–18 May 2025	Pincho Fernández (ESP); Federico Mouriño (ARG); 4–6, 6–1, 6–2	Manuel Gayone (ARG); Axel Guevara (ARG)	No women's draw	
Premier Padel P2 Asunción; Asunción, Paraguay €262.250; 20–25 May 2025	Federico Chingotto (ARG); Alejandro Galán (ESP); 7–6^{5}, 6–1	Pablo Cardona (ESP); Leandro Augsburger (ARG)	Claudia Fernández (ESP); Beatriz González (ESP); 7–6^{5}, 3–6, 6–2	Gemma Triay (ESP); Delfina Brea (ARG)
FIP Silver Dão Lafões; Viseu, Portugal €25,000; 22–25 May 2025	Salva Oria (ESP); Nacho Vilariño (ESP); 7–6^{4}, 3–4, 6–4	Coquito Zamora (ESP); Aimar Goñi (ESP)	Jimena Velasco (ESP); Noa Cánovas (ESP); 6–1, 6–4	Léa Godallier (FRA); Laura Luján (ESP)
FIP Silver REAP Manila; Manila, Philippines €15,000; 23–25 May 2025	Jose Luis González (ESP); Marco Cassetta (ITA); 7–6^{3}, 7–6^{8}	Sergi Nogueras (ESP); Marc Bernils (ESP)	Patricia Martínez (ESP); Letizia Manquillo (ESP); 6–2, 6–3	Aimee Gibson (GBR); Caterina Baldi (ITA)
FIP Bronze HOP London Padel Open; Whetstone, Great Britain €10,000; 23–25 May 2025	Jaume Romera (ESP); Marcos González (ESP); 6–3, 6–4	Adrián Marqués (ESP); Miguel González (ESP)	Carla Touly (FRA); Jessica Ginier (FRA); 6–3, 7–5	Emily Stellato (ITA); Giulia Sussarello (ITA)
FIP Bronze Kazakhstan; Almaty, Kazakhstan €3,500; 23–25 May 2025	No men's draw		Marcella Koek (NED); Rosalie van der Hoek (NED); 6–4, 6–0	Ainize Santamaría (ESP); Angelina Neizvestnaya (AIN)
FIP Bronze Hamburg; Hamburg, Germany €3,500; 23–25 May 2025	Manu Castaño (ESP); Alejandro Jerez (ESP); 7–6^{4}, 7–6^{2}	Rodrigo Coello (ESP); Ferrán Insa (ESP)	No women's draw	
Premier Padel P1 Buenos Aires; Buenos Aires, Argentina €474,500; 27 May–1 Jun. 2025	Arturo Coello (ESP); Agustín Tapia (ARG); 6–2, 6–2	Paquito Navarro (ESP); Lucas Bergamini (BRA)	Ariana Sánchez (ESP); Paula Josemaría (ESP); 6–2, 6–2	Claudia Fernández (ESP); Beatriz González (ESP)
FIP Silver Romania; Timișoara, Romania €20,000; 30 May–1 Jun. 2025	Clément Geens (BEL); Alejandro Jerez (ESP); 6–4, 6–2	Antonio Luque (POR); Diogo Jesus (POR)	Julia Polo (ESP); Noemí Aguilar (ESP); 7–6^{5}, 5–3^{rtd.}	Patricia Martínez (ESP); Letizia Manquillo (ESP)
FIP Silver Fastweb Perugia; Perugia, Italy €15,000; 30 May–1 Jun. 2025	Denis Perino (ITA); Mario Huete (ESP); 4–6, 6–3, 7–6^{3}	Nacho Vilariño (ESP); Salva Oria (ESP)	Bárbara Las Heras (ESP); Giorgia Marchetti (ITA); 6–0, 6–2	Léa Godallier (FRA); Laura Luján (ESP)
FIP Silver Dominican Republic; Punta Cana, Dominican Republic €15,000; 30 May–1 Jun. 2025	Youp de Kroon (NED); Julian Prins (NED); 0–6, 7–5, 6–1	Mateo Álvarez (ARG); Andrés Graupera (ARG)	Rebeca López (ESP); Amanda López (ESP); 6–2, 4–6, 6–4	Carla Fernández (ESP); Nerea Guerra (ESP)
FIP Bronze La Plana Sport; Castellón de la Plana, Spain €7,000; 30 May–1 Jun. 2025	Jaume Romera (ESP); Marcos González (ESP); 6–3, 7–5	Pepe Aliaga (ESP); Diego Dorta (ESP)	Ariadna Cañellas (ESP); Alicia Cañellas (ESP); 5–7, 6–2, 6–3	Lucía Peralta (ESP); Lorena Vano (ITA)

=== June ===
Tournament	Men's winners	Men's runners-up	Women's winners	Women's runners-up
FIP Silver Port de Bandol; Bandol, France €20,000; 6–8 June 2025	Pol Hernández (ESP); Guillermo Collado (ESP); 6–3, 6–3	Álvaro Cepero (ESP); Agustín Torre (ARG)	Léa Godallier (FRA); Laura Luján (ESP); 6–3, 6–3	Laia Rodríguez (ESP); Sandra Bellver (ESP)
FIP Bronze Indonesia I Jakarta, Indonesia €7,000; 6–8 June 2025	Sergi Nogueras (ESP); Marc Bernils (ESP); 7–5, 6–2	Miguel Melero (ESP); Nicolás Zurita (ITA)	Carla Fitó (ESP); Patricia Araus (ESP); 6–0, 6–1	Ainize Santamaría (ESP); Angelina Neizvestnaya (AIN)
BNL Italy Major; Rome, italy €1,029,558; 10–15 June 2025	Federico Chingotto (ARG); Alejandro Galán (ESP); 6–3, 7–5	Arturo Coello (ESP); Agustín Tapia (ARG)	Gemma Triay (ESP); Delfina Brea (ARG); 6–4, 6–4	Ariana Sánchez (ESP); Paula Josemaría (ESP)
FIP Bronze Cordenons; Cordenons, Italy €10,000; 13–15 June 2025	Aimar Goñi (ESP); Adrián Allemandi (ARG); 6–3, 4–6, 6–1	Pablo Reina (ESP); Samuel Rivas (ESP)	Jessica Castelló (ESP); Lorena Rufo (ESP); 6–1, 6–2	Lucía Pérez (ESP); Natalia Molinilla (ESP)
FIP Silver Camboriú; Camboriú, Brazil €7,500; 13–15 June 2025	Matheus Simonato (BRA); Lucas Cunha (BRA) w/o	Luciano Puppo (ARG); Máximo Maldonado (ARG)	No women's draw	
FIP Bronze Indonesia II; Bali, Indonesia €7,000; 13–15 June 2025	Miguel Melero (ESP); Nicolás Zurita (ITA); 6–3, 6–3	Pol Alsina (ESP); Eduard Altimires (ESP)	Carla Fitó (ESP); Patricia Araus (ESP); 6–1, 6–2	Ainize Santamaría (ESP); Angelina Neizvestnaya (AIN)
FIP Bronze Lyttos Crete I Hersonissos, Greece €7,000; 13–15 June 2025	Sergio Icardo (UAE); Jordi Casanova (ESP); 6–4, 6–2	Raúl Marcos (ESP); Gustavo Nunes (POR)	Aitana García (ESP); Claudia Escacena (ESP); 6–0, 6–2	Patrícia Ribeiro (POR); Catarina Santos (POR)
FIP Bronze Antofagasta Chile IV; Antofagasta, Chile €7,000; 13–15 June 2025	Diego Arredondo (MEX); Sergio Alba (ESP); 3–6, 6–3, 6–2	Matías del Moral (ARG); Leonardo Yob (ARG)	No women's draw	
FIP Bronze Camboriú; Camboriú, Brazil €3,500; 13–15 June 2025	No men's draw		Gabriela Roux (CHL); Giannina Minieri (CHL); 6–3, 7–6^{5}	Alessandra de Barros (BRA); Cristina Cirne (BRA)
FIP Bronze Alexandria; Alexandria, Egypt €7,000; 20–22 June 2025	Youssef Hossam (EGY); Julián Lacamoire (ARG); 6–2, 4–6, 6–3	Boris Castro (ESP); Pablo Castillo (ESP)	Victoria Kurz (GER); Janine Hemmes (NED) w/o	Rosalie van der Hoek (NED); Dóra Andrejszki (HUN)
FIP Bronze Benidorm; Benidorm, Spain €7,000; 20–22 June 2025	Emilio Chamero (ESP); Daniel Santigosa (ESP); 6–4, 3–6, 6–3	Diego Dorta (ESP); Daniel Martínez (ESP)	Ana Domínguez (ESP); Aída Martínez (ESP); 2–6, 6–2, 6–4	Patricia Martínez (ESP); Letizia Manquillo (ESP)
FIP Bronze Norway; Drammen, Norway €7,000; 20–22 June 2025	Daniel Windahl (SWE); Albin Olsson (SWE); 6–4, 6–4	Flavio Abbate (ITA); Álvaro Montiel (ITA)	Giulia Dal Pozzo (ITA); Anna Ortiz (ESP); 6–4, 2–6, 6–3	Giulia Sussarello (ITA); Emily Stellato (ITA)
FIP Bronze Phuket; Phuket, Thailand €7,000; 20–22 June 2025	Miguel Melero (ESP); Nicolás Zurita (ITA); 7–6^{3}, 6–2	Santi Pineda (ESP); Cristóbal García (ESP)	Daiara Valenzuela (ARG); Nika Sluzhiteleva (AIN); 6–4, 7–6^{9}	Carla Fitó (ESP); Patricia Araus (ESP)
Premier Padel P2 Oysho Valladolid; Valladolid, Spain €262,250; 23–29 June 2025	Arturo Coello (ESP); Agustín Tapia (ARG); 7–5, 6–4	Franco Stupaczuk (ARG); Juan Lebrón (ESP)	Ariana Sánchez (ESP); Paula Josemaría (ESP); 6–4, 7–5	Claudia Fernández (ESP); Beatriz González (ESP)
FIP Silver Mediolanum Cup Palermo; Palermo, Italy €20,000; 26–29 June 2025	Javi Ruiz (ESP); Gonzalo Rubio (ESP); 6–2, 6–3	Álex Ruiz (ESP); Maxi Sánchez (ARG)	Giulia Dal Pozzo (ITA); Anna Ortiz (ESP); 6–3, 6–1	Marina Lobo (ESP); Sofi Saiz (ESP)
FIP Silver Utrecht; Utrecht, Netherlands €15,000; 26–29 June 2025	Emilio Chamero (ESP); Daniel Santigosa (ESP)^{7}6–7, 6–3, 6–0	Guillermo Collado (ESP); Javier Valdés (CHI)	Julieta Bidahorria (ARG); Lara Arruabarrena (ESP); 6–3, 4–6, 6–2	Águeda Pérez (ESP); Marta Borrero (ESP)
FIP Bronze Oeiras Prosonic – UBBO; Oeiras, Portugal €7,000; 26–29 June 2025	Boris Castro (ESP); Pablo Castillo (ESP); 6–3, 6–1	Víctor Mena (ESP); Pedro Meléndez (ESP)	Nuria Vivancos (ESP); Xènia Clascà (ESP); 3–6, 6–3, 7–6^{6}	Ana Sánchez (ESP); Elena de la Rosa (ESP)

=== July ===
Tournament	Men's winners	Men's runners-up	Women's winners	Women's runners-up
Premier Padel P2 Bordeaux; Bordeaux, France €262,250; 30 Jun.–6 Jul. 2025	Arturo Coello (ESP); Agustín Tapia (ARG); 7–6^{12}, 6–4	Federico Chingotto (ARG); Alejandro Galán (ESP)	Sofia Araújo (POR); Andrea Ustero (ESP); 7–5, 2–6, 6–2	Carmen Goenaga (ESP); Beatriz Caldera (ESP)
FIP Silver Mediolanum Cup Treviso; Treviso, Italy €20,000; 4–6 July 2025	Juani Rubini (ARG); Alonso Rodríguez (ESP)^{8}6–7, 7–6^{3}, 6–4	Álvaro Montiel (ITA); Flavio Abbate (ITA)	Águeda Pérez (ESP); Marta Borrero (ESP); 2–6, 7–6^{2}, 6–1	Julieta Bidahorria (ARG); Lara Arruabarrena (ESP)
FIP Silver Chengdu; Chengdu, China €15,000; 4–6 July 2025	Emilio Chamero (ESP); Daniel Santigosa (ESP); 6–2, 6–2	Adrián Rodríguez (ESP); Héctor Vázquez (ESP)	Nuria Rodríguez (ESP); Carolina Orsi (ITA); 6–0, 7–6^{4}	María Portillo (ESP); Claudia Escacena (ESP)
FIP Bronze Tbilisi; Tbilisi, Georgia €7,000; 4–6 July 2025	Manu Castaño (ESP); Alejandro Jerez (ESP); 6–4, 6–3	Boris Castro (ESP); Pablo Castillo (ESP)	Elena de la Rosa (ESP); Paula Ferrán (ESP); 6–4, 6–2	Marcella Koek (NED); Bo Luttikhuis (NED)
FIP Silver Côte du Midi; Narbonne, France €15,000; 10–13 July 2025	Juanlu Esbrí (ESP); Jose Gª Diestro (ESP); 6–0, 6–3	Marcel Font (ESP); Iago Fuertes (ESP)	Nuria Rodríguez (ESP); Carolina Orsi (ITA); 3–6, 6–1, 6–0	Camila Fassio (ESP); Carla Touly (FRA)
FIP Silver Giulianova; Giulianova, Italy €15,000; 11–13 July 2025	Pol Hernández (ESP); Guillermo Collado (ESP); 7–6^{4}, 6–4	Facundo Domínguez (ITA); Diego Gil (ESP)	Marta Talaván (ESP); Teresa Navarro (ESP); 6–1, 6–3	Giulia Dal Pozzo (ITA); Anna Ortiz (ESP)
FIP Silver Koksijde; Koksijde, Belgium €15,000; 11–13 July 2025	Miguel Deus (POR); Nuno Deus (POR); 6–3^{rtd.}	Curro Cabeza (ESP); Ramiro Moyano (ARG)	Lucía Martínez (ESP); Raquel Eugenio (ESP); 6–4, 6–2	Mónica Gómez (ESP); Lucía Micaela (ESP)
FIP Bronze Tokyo; Tokyo, Japan €7,000; 11–13 July 2025	Miguel Melero (ESP); Nicolás Zurita (ITA); 7–6^{5}, 7–6^{5}	Diego Arredondo (MEX); Sergio Alba (ESP)	Camila Ramme (MEX); Rosalie van der Hoek (NED); 6–2, 6–1	Kotomi Ozawa (JPN); Saki Tsukamoto (JPN)
FIP Bronze Chile V Viña del Mar, Chile €7,000; 11–13 July 2025	Renzo Núñez (ARG); Kevin Kviatkovski (ARG); 6–2, 6–3	Luciano Puppo (ARG); Leonardo Yob (ARG)	Manuela Schuck (BRA); Cristina Cirne (BRA); 6–1, 6–1	Catalina Arancibia (CHL); Kimberley Ahumada (CHL)
FIP Silver Veracruz; Veracruz, Mexico €30,000; 17–19 July 2025	Maxi Sánchez (ARG); Federico Chiostri (ARG); 7–6, 6–2	Joaquín de Astoreca (ARG); Nacho Archieri (ARG)	Janine Hemmes (NED); Bo Luttikhuis (NED); 6–4, 7–6	Manuela Schuck (BRA); Raquel Piltcher (BRA)
Premier Padel P1 Málaga; Málaga, Spain €474,500; 14–20 July 2025	Arturo Coello (ESP); Agustín Tapia (ARG); 6–4, 7–5	Federico Chingotto (ARG); Alejandro Galán (ESP)	Claudia Fernández (ESP); Beatriz González (ESP); 6–2, 6–1	Marta Ortega (ESP); Tamara Icardo (ESP)
FIP Silver Trecar Cup; Sandigliano, Italy €15,000; 18–20 July 2025	Álvaro Mélendez (ESP); Pedro Meléndez (ESP); 6–7, 6–3, 6–4	Daniel Windahl (SWE); Albin Olsson (SWE)	Camila Fassio (ESP); Giulia Dal Pozzo (ITA); 6–0, 6–3	Louise Bahurel (FRA); Lucile Pothier (FRA)
FIP Bronze Aveiro; Aveiro, Portugal €10,000; 18–20 July 2025	Alfonso Sánchez (ESP); Joaquim Florensa (ESP); 7–6^{2}, 6–1	Pablo Sánchez (ESP); Miguel Morales (ESP)	Margarida Fernandes (POR); Brittany Dubins (USA); 6–3, 4–6, 6–4	Claudia Escacena (ESP); Cayetana Sánchez (ESP)
FIP Bronze Elche; Elche, Spain €7,000; 18–20 July 2025	Sergio Arias (ESP); Aarón García (ESP); 7–6, 7–5	Adrián Naranjo (ESP); José Román Martínez (ESP)	María Delgado (ESP); Martina Vera (ESP); 6–4, 7–5	Maria Rasmussen (DEN); Gitte Haxen (DEN)
FIP Silver Mimosa Open Porto; Porto, Portugal €27,000; 25–27 July 2025	Juanlu Esbrí (ESP); Jose Gª Diestro (ESP); 6–1, 1–6, 6–2	Jose Jiménez (ESP); Maxi Sánchez (ARG)	Jessica Castelló (ESP); Lorena Rufo (ESP); 7–6^{4}, 6–4	Alix Collombon (FRA); Araceli Martínez (ESP)
FIP Silver Lelystad; Lelystad, Netherlands €15,000; 25–27 July 2025	Diego García (ESP); Javier Martínez (ESP); 1–6, 6–2, 6–2	Jose Luis González (ESP); Marco Cassetta (ITA)	Julieta Bidahorria (ARG); Lara Arruabarrena (ESP); 6–3, 6–4	Lucía García (ESP); Natividad López (ESP)
FIP Silver Lyttos Crete I Hersonissos, Greece €7,500; 25–27 July 2025	Gonzalo Rubio (ESP); Javi Ruiz (ESP); 7–6^{2}, 3–6, 6–3	Lucas Campagnolo (BRA); David Gala (ESP)	No women's draw	

=== August ===
Tournament	Men's winners	Men's runners-up	Women's winners	Women's runners-up
Premier Padel P1 Cupra Costa Daurada; Tarragona, Spain €474,500; 28 July–3 August 2025	Arturo Coello (ESP); Agustín Tapia (ARG); 7–6^{3}, 7–5	Alejandro Galán (ESP); Federico Chingotto (ARG)	Gemma Triay (ESP); Delfina Brea (ARG); 7–6^{3}, 6–4	Ariana Sánchez (ESP); Paula Josemaría (ESP)
FIP Bronze Lyttos Crete II; Hersonissos, Greece €7,000; 1–3 August 2025	Jose Luis González (ESP); Marco Cassetta (ITA); 6–2, 6–2	Nacho Moragues (ESP); Manuel Aragón (ESP)	Lucía García (ESP); Natividad López (ESP); 6–1, 6–1	Marcella Koek (NED); Victoria Kurz (GER)
FIP Bronze Porto Alegre; Porto Alegre, Brazil €7,000; 1–3 August 2025	Maxi Sánchez (ARG); Federico Chiostri (ARG); 6–4, 4–6, 6–3	Felipe Calleja (ARG); Fran Maier (ARG)	Manuela Schuck (BRA); Raquel Piltcher (BRA); 6–3, 6–3	Gabriela Roux (CHL); Giannina Minieri (CHL)
FIP Gold Potosí; San Luis Potosí, Mexico €50,000; 7–9 August 2025	Álex Ruiz (ESP); Agustín Torre (ARG); 6–3, 7–5	Juani Rubini (ARG); Alonso Rodríguez (ESP)	Marina Guinart (ESP); Victoria Iglesias (ESP); 6–4, 7–6	Noemí Aguilar (ESP); Julia Polo (ESP)
FIP Bronze Island Padel Jersey; St Clement, Jersey €10,000; 8–10 August 2025	Clément Geens (BEL); Albin Olsson (SWE); 4–6, 6–2, 7–6^{4}	Simone Cremona (ITA); Giulio Graziotti (ITA)	Camila Fassio (ESP); Carla Touly (FRA); 6–2, 6–1	Carolina Navarro (SWE); Bruna Melo (POR)
FIP Silver Portimão; Portimão, Portugal €7,500; 8–10 August 2025	Javi Ruiz (ESP); Facundo Domínguez (ITA); 6–4, 6–0	Jose Gª Diestro (ESP); Teodoro Zapata (ESP)	No women's draw	
FIP Bronze Chile VI; Copiapó, Chile €7,000; 8–10 August 2025	Leonardo Yob (ARG); Martín Abud (PAR); 6–3, 3–6, 7–6	Máximo Maldonado (ARG); Luciano Puppo (ARG)	No women's draw	
FIP Bronze Portimão; Portimão, Portugal €3,500; 8–10 August 2025	No men's draw		Letizia Manquillo (ESP); Laura Luján (ESP); 6–1, 6–2	María Portillo (ESP); Claudia Escacena (ESP)
FIP Gold Gran Canaria; Las Palmas, Spain €50,000; 15–17 August 2025	Jose Jiménez (ESP); Maxi Sánchez (ARG); 4–6, 6–3, 6–3	Marc Quílez (ESP); Tonet Sans (ESP)	Jessica Castelló (ESP); Lorena Rufo (ESP); 6–3, 6–2	Jimena Velasco (ESP); Raquel Eugenio (ESP)
FIP Bronze Vilamoura Summer Cup; Vilamoura, Portugal €10,000; 15–17 August 2025	Jesús Moya (ESP); Pedro Araújo (POR); 7–6^{5}, 7–6^{4}	Facundo Dehnike (PAR); Dylan Cuello (ARG)	Lucía García (ESP); Natividad López (ESP); 6–1, 6–1	Camila Fassio (ESP); Carla Touly (FRA)
FIP Silver Isla de La Palma; Los Llanos de Aridane, Spain €15,000; 21–23 August 2025	Luciano Capra (ARG); Aimar Goñi (ESP); 6–3, 7–6^{3}	Nacho Piotto (ARG); Denis Perino (ITA)	Jessica Castelló (ESP); Lorena Rufo (ESP); 6–4, 6–3	Carolina Navarro (SWE); Lucía García (ESP)
FIP Silver Belgrade; Belgrade, Serbia €25,000; 22–24 August 2025	Álvaro Montiel (ITA); Flavio Abbate (ITA); 7–5, 7–6^{3}	Pol Hernández (ESP); Guillermo Collado (ESP)	Ksenia Sharifova (AIN); Virginia Riera (ARG); 3–6, 6–2, 6–3	Giulia Dal Pozzo (ITA); Anna Ortiz (ESP)
FIP Silver Córdoba; Córdoba, Spain €15,000; 28–31 August 2025	Edu Alonso (ESP); Jairo Bautista (ESP); 6–4, 6–4	Aris Patiniotis (ITA); Jesús Moya (ESP)	Ksenia Sharifova (AIN); Virginia Riera (ARG); 7–6, 6–4	Ana Domínguez (ESP); Aida Martínez (ESP)
FIP Silver Porto Sant'Elpidio; Porto Sant'Elpidio, Italy €15,000; 29–31 August 2025	Pol Hernández (ESP); Guillermo Collado (ESP); 6–3, 2–6, 6–2	Nacho Piotto (ARG); Denis Perino (ITA)	Marianela Montesi (ITA); María Laura Ferreyra (ARG); 6–1, 3–2^{rtd.}	Alba Pérez (ESP); Lorena Vano (ITA)
FIP Bronze Westerbork; Westerbork, Netherlands €7,000; 29–31 August 2025	Mariano González (PAR); Martín Abud (PAR); 3–6, 7–5, 6–4	Simone Cremona (ITA); Dylan Cuello (ARG)	Marcella Koek (NED); Victoria Kurz (GER); 0–6, 6–2, 6–0	Steffie Weterings (NED); Tia Norton (GBR)

=== September ===
Tournament	Men's winners	Men's runners-up	Women's winners	Women's runners-up
Premier Padel P1 Madrid; Madrid, Spain €474,500; 2–7 September 2025	Martín di Nenno (ARG); Leandro Augsburger (ARG); 4–6, 6–3, 6–4	Arturo Coello (ESP); Agustín Tapia (ARG)	Claudia Fernández (ESP); Beatriz González (ESP); 3–6, 6–1, 6–4	Gemma Triay (ESP); Delfina Brea (ARG)
FIP Silver Beefeater 0.0; Oeiras, Portugal €15,000; 4–7 September 2025	Gonzalo Rubio (ESP); Javi Ruiz (ESP); 6–3, 7–6^{4}	Mariano González (PAR); Martín Abud (PAR)	Sandra Bellver (ESP); Ariadna Cañellas (ESP); 7–5, 6–1	Margarida Fernandes (POR); Brittany Dubins (USA)
FIP Bronze Finland II; Espoo, Finland €7,000; 5–7 September 2025	Renzo Núñez (ARG); Kevin Kviatkovski (ARG); 6–0, 7–5	Miguel Melero (ESP); Nicolás Zurita (ITA)	Teresa Moríñigo (ESP); Blanca Arriola (ESP); 6–1, 2–6, 6–0	Ainize Santamaría (ESP); Giorgia Rosi (ITA)
FIP Bronze Viña del Mar; Viña del Mar, Chile €3,500; 5–7 September 2025	Máximo Maldonado (ARG); Luciano Puppo (ARG); 7–6, 6–4	Leonardo Yob (ARG); Joaquín de Astoreca (ARG)	No women's draw	
FIP Silver Aguascalientes; Aguascalientes, Mexico €30,000; 11–13 September 2025	Nicolás Crosio (ARG); Matías Gutiérrez (ARG); 6–3, 1–6, 7–5	Manuel Gayone (ARG); Axel Guevara (ARG)	Camila Ramme (MEX); Carlotta Casali (ITA); 6–3, 6–1	Manuela Schuck (BRA); Carla Fitó (ESP)
Premier Padel Alpine Paris Major; Paris, France €1,029,558; 9–14 September 2025	Arturo Coello (ESP); Agustín Tapia (ARG); 6–1, 6–4	Alejandro Galán (ESP); Federico Chingotto (ARG)	Gemma Triay (ESP); Delfina Brea (ARG); 7–5, 6–2	Marta Ortega (ESP); Tamara Icardo (ESP)
FIP Silver Ceuta; Ceuta, Spain €15,000; 12–14 September 2025	Álvaro Mélendez (ESP); Pedro Meléndez (ESP); 6–3, 6–4	Miguel González (ESP); Alejandro Jerez (ESP)	Lucía García (ESP); Natividad López (ESP); 6–1, 6–3	Ainara Pozuelo (ESP); Valeria Atencia (ESP)
FIP Silver Guimarães; Guimarães, Portugal €15,000; 12–14 September 2025	Víctor Mena (ESP); Pau Miñano (ESP); 6–1, 6–3	Diego Dorta (ESP); Marcos Córdoba (ESP)	Daiara Valenzuela (ARG); Raquel Piltcher (BRA); 3–6, 7–5, 6–2	Aitana García (ESP); Catarina Santos (POR)
FIP Bronze R3 Bullpadel Cup - Sport4Lux; Schuttrange, Luxembourg €7,000; 12–14 September 2025	Albert Roglán (ESP); Ferrán Insa (ESP); 6–1, 6–2	Pablo Sánchez (ESP); Miguel Morales (ESP)	Caterina Baldi (ITA); Giulia Sussarello (ITA); 6–2, 6–2	Steffie Weterings (NED); Liza Groenveld (NED)
FIP Platinum Sevilla; Seville, Spain €120,000; 16–20 September 2025	Lucas Bergamini (BRA); Paquito Navarro (ESP); 7–5, 6–3	Álex Ruiz (ESP); Víctor Ruiz (ESP)	Alejandra Alonso (ESP); Claudia Jensen (ARG); 7–6^{5}, 6–3	Verónica Virseda (ESP); Aranzazu Osoro (ARG)
FIP Silver Lisboa Racket Centre; Lisbon, Portugal €25,000; 19–21 September 2025	Jose Jiménez (ESP); Maxi Sánchez (ARG); 6–2, 6–4	Luis Hernández (ESP); Enrique Goenaga (ESP)	Ana Catarina Nogueira (POR); Melani Merino (ESP); 7–6^{5}, 6–2	Lucía Micaela (ESP); Teresa Moríñigo (ESP)
FIP Bronze Sassuolo; Sassuolo, Italy €10,000; 19–21 September 2025	Pepe Aliaga (ESP); Marcos González (ESP); 6–2, 6–1	Lorenzo di Giovanni (ITA); Simone Iacovino (ITA)	Giulia Dal Pozzo (ITA); Anna Ortiz (ESP); 6–4, 6–4	Caterina Baldi (ITA); Giulia Sussarello (ITA)
Premier Padel P2 Cupra Germany; Düsseldorf, Germany €262,250; 22–28 September 2025	Alejandro Galán (ESP); Federico Chingotto (ARG); 7–6^{7}, 6–2	Arturo Coello (ESP); Agustín Tapia (ARG)	Gemma Triay (ESP); Delfina Brea (ARG); 6–4, 4–6, 6–3	Ariana Sánchez (ESP); Paula Josemaría (ESP)
FIP Silver Mediolanum Padel Cup Torino; Turin, Italy €20,000; 26–28 September 2025	Luciano Capra (ARG); Aimar Goñi (ESP); 6–3, 6–4	Juan Pablo Dametto (ARG); Nacho Archieri (ARG)	Aranzazu Osoro (ARG); Victoria Iglesias (ESP); 7–6^{3}, 6–1	Letizia Manquillo (ESP); Laura Luján (ESP)
FIP Silver Kazakhstan; Almaty, Kazakhstan €15,000; 26–28 September 2025	Gonzalo Rubio (ESP); Javier Martínez (ESP); 6–2, 6–3	Gustavo Nunes (POR); José Solano (ESP)	Marta Talaván (ESP); Sofi Saiz (ESP); 6–0, 6–0	Carolina Navarro (SWE); Mónica Gómez (ESP)
FIP Bronze Alicante; Alicante, Spain €7,000; 26–28 September 2025	Mario del Castillo (ESP); Javi Rico (ESP); 6–0, 6–4	Pedro Araújo (POR); Cándido Alfaro (ESP)	Rebeca López (ESP); Xènia Clascà (ESP); 3–6, 6–1, 6–1	Alexandra Silva (POR); Mafalda Fernandes (POR)
FIP Bronze Skechers West Coast Masters; Esbjerg, Denmark €7,000; 26–28 September 2025	Dylan Cuello (ARG); Santiago Rolla (ARG); 6–2, 7–6^{9}	Oscar Sebber Gormsen (DEN); Alex Loughlan (GBR)	Aitana García (ESP); Cristina Carrascosa (ESP); 7–6^{2}, 7–6^{7}	Rosalie van der Hoek (NED); Puck Bernard (NED)
FIP Bronze REAP Samui; Samui, Thailand €7,000; 26–28 September 2025	Miguel Melero (ESP); Nicolás Zurita (ITA); 6–3, 3–6, 6–2	Cristóbal García (ESP); Daniel Blanco (ESP)	Patrícia Ribeiro (POR); Clarinha Santos (POR); 7–6, 2–6, 7–5	Lucía Micaela (ESP); Nika Sluzhiteleva (AIN)
FIP Junior (U18) World Cup – Pairs; Reus, Spain n/a 29 September–4 October 2025	Manu Castaño (ESP); Samuel Rivas (ESP); 6–2, 3–6, 6–3	Facundo Dehnike (PAR); Mariano González (PAR)	Claudia Escacena (ESP); Sara Foguer (ESP); 6–2, 6–1	Martina Rivera (ESP); Alba Vázquez (ESP)
FIP Junior (U18) World Cup – Teams; Reus, Spain n/a 29 September–4 October 2025	Spain; 2–1	Argentina	Spain; 2–0	Portugal
Premier Padel P1 Rotterdam; Rotterdam, Netherlands €474,500; 30 September–5 October 2025	Arturo Coello (ESP); Agustín Tapia (ARG); 6–3, 7–6^{4}	Federico Chingotto (ARG); Alejandro Galán (ESP)	Gemma Triay (ESP); Delfina Brea (ARG); 6–2, 3–6, 6–4	Ariana Sánchez (ESP); Paula Josemaría (ESP)

=== October ===
Tournament	Men's winners	Men's runners-up	Women's winners	Women's runners-up
FIP Silver Ivory Coast II; Abidjan, Ivory Coast €15,000; 3–5 October 2025	Fran Ramírez (ESP); Luis Oliver (ESP); 7–6^{6}, 6–4	Boris Castro (ESP); Rodrigo Coello (ESP)	Letizia Manquillo (ESP); Laura Luján (ESP); 6–3, 6–2	Aitana García (ESP); Carla Fernández (ESP)
FIP Bronze Almeirim; Almeirim, Portugal €10,000; 3–5 October 2025	Álvaro López (ESP); Agustín Reca (GER); 6–1, 6–2	Afonso Fazendeiro (POR); Pedro Perry (POR)	Carolina Navarro (SWE); Mónica Gómez (ESP); 6–3, 6–2	Alexandra Silva (POR); Mafalda Fernandes (POR)
FIP Bronze Fovea; Foggia, Italy €10,000; 3–5 October 2025	Isaac Huysveld (BEL); Nicolas Rouanet (FRA); 7–6, 7–5	Arthur Hugounenq (FRA); Steve Stracquadaini (ITA)	Rosalie van der Hoek (NED); Justine Pysson (BEL); 6–3, 6–3	Karin Hechenberger (SUI); Lisa Phillips (GBR)
FIP Bronze India; Bengaluru, India €7,000; 3–5 October 2025	Willy Släryd (SWE); Oscar Sebber Gormsen (DEN); 7–6^{4}, 7–6^{2}	Sergi Guimet (ESP); Pablo Pastor (ESP)	No women's draw	
FIP Bronze Santiago de Chile VIII; Santiago, Chile €3,500; 3–6 October 2025	Luciano Puppo (ARG); Máximo Maldonado (ARG); 6–3, 6–4	Felipe Calleja (ARG); Fran Maier (ARG)	No women's draw	
Premier Padel P1 Oysho Milano; Milan, Italy €474,500; 6–12 October 2025	Federico Chingotto (ARG); Alejandro Galán (ESP); 2–6, 6–3, 6–0	Arturo Coello (ESP); Agustín Tapia (ARG)	Ariana Sánchez (ESP); Paula Josemaría (ESP); 6–2, 6–4	Claudia Fernández (ESP); Beatriz González (ESP)
FIP Silver Indian Open; Hyderabad, India €15,000; 9–12 October 2025	Guillem Figuerola (ESP); Roberto Belmont (ESP); 6–3, 7–5	Miguel Melero (ESP); Nicolás Zurita (ITA)	Letizia Manquillo (ESP); Laura Luján (ESP); 6–3, 4–6, 6–1	Marcella Koek (NED); Victoria Kurz (GER)
FIP Silver Melilla Ciudad del Deporte; Melilla, Spain €30,000; 10–12 October 2025	Adam Axelsson (SWE); Adrián Marqués (ESP); 6–3, 6–4	Enrique Goenaga (ESP); Luis Hernández (ESP)	Lucía García (ESP); Amanda López (ESP); 7–6^{2}, 6–2	Natividad López (ESP); Ana Sánchez (ESP)
FIP Silver R3 Bullpadel Cup; Stratford, Great Britain €15,000; 10–12 October 2025	Álvaro Cepero (ESP); Andrés Fernández (ESP); 6–3, 6–4	Coquito Zamora (ESP); Alberto Gª Trabanco (ESP)	Eugènia Guimet (ESP); María Laura Ferreyra (ARG); 4–6, 6–4, 6–1	Camila Fassio (ESP); Rebeca López (ESP)
FIP Bronze Open Poreč-Parenzo; Poreč, Croatia €10,000; 10–12 October 2025	Douglas Rutgersson (SWE); Daniel Appelgren (SWE); 6–4, 6–0	Youp de Kroon (NED); Julian Prins (NED)	Lucía Peralta (ESP); Carla Touly (FRA); 6–0, 6–0	Anna Schmid (AUT); Tetyana Dychka (UKR)
FIP Bronze Austin; Austin, United States €10,000; 10–12 October 2025	Vinny Di Francesco (USA); Octavio Álvarez (ARG); 6–1, 6–2	Felipe Calleja (ARG); Fran Maier (ARG)	Brittany Dubins (USA); Margarida Fernandes (POR); 6–4, 6–0	Camila Ramme (MEX); Jordana Luján (ARG)
FIP Bronze Confapi Piacenza; Piacenza, Italy €7,000; 10–12 October 2025	Afonso Fazendeiro (POR); Pedro Perry (POR); 6–2, 6–3	Mariano González (PAR); Antonio Graupera (ARG)	Teresa Moríñigo (ESP); Blanca Arriola (ESP); 6–4, 6–3	Elsa Terranova (ITA); Marisol Fernández (ESP)
FIP Bronze E4 Arena Swedish Open; Jönköping, Sweden €7,000; 16–18 October 2025	Menno Nolten (NED); Willy Släryd (SWE); 7–5, 3–6, 6–2	Sten Richters (NED); Bart van Opstal (NED)	Caterina Baldi (ITA); Clarissa Aima (ITA); 6–4, 2–6, 6–4	Maria Rasmussen (DEN); Simone Alipieva (DEN)
FIP Platinum Lyon; Lyon, France €135,000; 15–19 October 2025	Álex Ruiz (ESP); Juanlu Esbrí (ESP); 3–6, 6–3, 6–4	Edu Alonso (ESP); Juan Tello (ARG)	Alejandra Salazar (ESP); Martina Calvo (ESP); 6–3, 7–6^{1}	Tamara Icardo (ESP); Marina Guinart (ESP)
FIP Silver Oporto II; Porto, Portugal €15,000; 17–19 October 2025	Javi Ruiz (ESP); David Gala (ESP); 1–6, 7–6^{5}, 6–2	Coquito Zamora (ESP); Ramiro Pereyra (ARG)	Noa Cánovas (ESP); Laia Rodríguez (ESP); 6–4, 6–1	Lucía García (ESP); Amanda López (ESP)
FIP Silver Réunion Island I Saint-Denis, Réunion, France €15,000; 17–19 October 2025	Pincho Fernández (ESP); Pablo García (ESP); 7–6^{2}, 6–1	Miguel González (ESP); Fran Ramírez (ESP)	Julieta Bidahorria (ARG); Marta Talaván (ESP); 6–3, 6–3	Noemí Aguilar (ESP); Julia Polo (ESP)
FIP Bronze Sofia; Sofia, Bulgaria €7,000; 17–19 October 2025	Nacho Piotto (ARG); Denis Perino (ITA); 6–3, 6–3	Clément Geens (BEL); Alejandro Jerez (ESP)	Natalia Molinilla (ESP); Paula Ferrán (ESP); 6–4, 7–5	Teresa Moríñigo (ESP); Blanca Arriola (ESP)
FIP Asia Padel Cup; Doha, Qatar n/a 17–24 October 2025	United Arab Emirates; 2–1	Qatar	Japan; 2–0	Iran
FIP Euro Padel Cup; La Línea de la Concepción, Spain n/a 21–25 October 2025	Spain; 2–0	Portugal	Spain; 2–0	France
FIP Silver Réunion Island II; Saint-Paul, Réunion, France €15,000; 23–26 October 2025	Pincho Fernández (ESP); Pablo García (ESP); 6–3, 6–4	Facundo Domínguez (ITA); Mario Huete (ESP)	Noemí Aguilar (ESP); Julia Polo (ESP); 6–4, 6–4	Alba Pérez (ESP); Lorena Vano (ITA)
FIP Silver Cupra Antalya; Antalya, Turkey €15,000; 24–26 October 2025	Alex Arroyo (ESP); Mario Ortega (ESP); 6–2, 6–3	Tonet Sans (ESP); Marc Quílez (ESP)	Marta Arellano (ESP); Ariadna Cañellas (ESP); 6–4, 2–6, 6–3	Sandra Bellver (ESP); Sara Foguer (ESP)
FIP Bronze Terni; Terni, Italy €7,000; 24–26 October 2025	Álvaro Mélendez (ESP); Pedro Meléndez (ESP); 7–6^{5}, 6–2	Guillem Figuerola (ESP); Roberto Belmont (ESP)	Lucía García (ESP); Amanda López (ESP); 6–1, 6–3	Ivet Val (ESP); Valentina Tommasi (ITA)
FIP Bronze Villena; Villena, Spain €7,000; 24–26 October 2025	Manu Castaño (ESP); Juani de Pascual (ARG); 6–3, 6–4	Miki Solbes (ESP); Christian Fuster (ESP)	Patricia Martínez (ESP); Esther Carnicero (ESP); 6–3, 6–2	Ana Domínguez (ESP); Aida Martínez (ESP)
Premier Padel P2 Giza; Giza, Egypt €474,500; 27 October–1 November 2025	Federico Chingotto (ARG); Alejandro Galán (ESP); 6–1, 6–2	Jon Sanz (ESP); Paquito Navarro (ESP)	Ariana Sánchez (ESP); Paula Josemaría (ESP); 6–3, 6–0	Alejandra Salazar (ESP); Martina Calvo (ESP)
FIP Silver DAMAC Dubai II; Dubai, United Arab Emirates €20,000; 30 October–2 November 2025	David Gala (ESP); Pablo García (ESP); 3–6, 7–6^{7}, 7–5	Jose Jiménez (ESP); Pablo Lijó (ESP)	Patricia Llaguno (ESP); Martina Fassio (ARG); 6–4, 7–5	Lucía Sainz (ESP); Raquel Eugenio (ESP)
FIP Silver Mediolanum Padel Cup Perugia; Perugia, Italy €20,000; 31 October–2 November 2025	Javier Barahona (ESP); Javi García (ESP); 6–2, 6–4	Jaume Romera (ESP); Alberto Gª Trabanco (ESP)	Nuria Rodríguez (ESP); Lucía Martínez (ESP); 7–5, 4–6, 6–2	Marta Borrero (ESP); Marta Arellano (ESP)
FIP Silver San Diego; San Diego, United States €15,000; 31 October–2 November 2025	Mariano González (PAR); Juani de Pascual (ARG); 6–2, 6–0	Santi Pineda (ESP); Alfonso Sánchez (ESP)	Brittany Dubins (USA); Anna Cortiles (ESP); 6–2, 6–2	María Delgado (ESP); Martina Vera (ESP)
FIP Silver San Martín–MZA; San Martín, Argentina €7,500; 31 October–2 November 2025	Leonel Aguirre (ARG); Alex Chozas (ARG); 6–2, 6–2	Luciano Puppo (ARG); Máximo Maldonado (ARG)	No women's draw	
FIP Bronze Vic; Vic, Spain €7,500; 31 October–2 November 2025	Ferrán Insa (ESP); Albert Roglán (ESP); 6–1, 7–6^{4}	Simone Cremona (ITA); Manuel Aragón (ESP)	Alba Vázquez (ESP); Cristina Rodríguez (ESP); 6–0, 3–6, 6–1	Susana Martín (ESP); María Arteaga (ESP)
FIP Bronze Gatorade House of Games; Espoo, Finland €7,000; 31 October–2 November 2025	Youp de Kroon (NED); Julian Prins (NED); 6–4, 7–6^{5}	Rodrigo Coello (ESP); Borja Trujillo (ESP)	Carla Fernández (ESP); Nerea Guerra (ESP); 6–3, 7–6^{5}	Caterina Baldi (ITA); Giulia Sussarello (ITA)
FIP Bronze San Martín–MZA; San Martín, Argentina €3,500; 31 October–2 November 2025	No men's draw		Daniela Banchero (ARG); Irene Jiménez (ARG); 6–4, 6–1	Catalina Arancibia (CHL); Kimberley Ahumada (CHL)

=== November ===
Tournament	Men's winners	Men's runners-up	Women's winners	Women's runners-up
FIP World Cup – Pairs; Kuwait City, Kuwait n/a 3–9 November 2025	Federico Chingotto (ARG); Alejandro Galán (ESP); 2–6, 7–5, 6–2	Arturo Coello (ESP); Agustín Tapia (ARG)	Ariana Sánchez (ESP); Paula Josemaría (ESP); 6–3, 6–3	Gemma Triay (ESP); Delfina Brea (ARG)
FIP Bronze REAP Hong Kong; Sai Kung Town, Hong Kong €7,000; 7–9 November 2025	Dylan Guichard (FRA); Antonio Luque (POR); 4–4^{rtd.}	Johan Bergeron (FRA); Timéo Fonteny (FRA)	Carla Fitó (ESP); Patricia Araus (ESP); 6–1, 6–2	Alena Vasileva (AIN); Vilena Petrova (AIN)
FIP Bronze Dénia; Dénia, Spain €7,000; 7–9 November 2025	Nacho Archieri (ARG); Ramiro Pereyra (ARG); 6–3, 6–4	Santi Pineda (ESP); Alfonso Sánchez (ESP)	Ainize Santamaría (ESP); Giorgia Rosi (ITA); 6–4, 5–7, 6–2	Mónica Gómez (ESP); Louise Bahurel (FRA)
FIP Bronze Chile IX; San Antonio, Chile €3,500; 7–9 November 2025	Felipe Calleja (ARG); Fran Maier (ARG); 6–4, 6–4	Luciano Puppo (ARG); Máximo Maldonado (ARG)	No women's draw	
FIP Silver REAP Hong Kong; Ma On Shan, Hong Kong €15,000; 13–15 November 2025	Dylan Guichard (FRA); Antonio Luque (POR); 7–6^{14}, 6–3	Thijs Roper (NED); Julien Seurin (FRA)	Alba Pérez (ESP); Aimee Gibson (GBR); 6–2, 6–4	Ana Varo (ESP); Lucía Micaela (ESP)
Premier Padel P1 Dubai; Dubai, United Arab Emirates €474,500; 11–16 November 2025	Arturo Coello (ESP); Agustín Tapia (ARG); 6–3, 6–4	Federico Chingotto (ARG); Alejandro Galán (ESP)	Claudia Fernández (ESP); Beatriz González (ESP); 6–1, 7–5	Gemma Triay (ESP); Delfina Brea (ARG)
FIP Silver Bioniq; Porto, Portugal €15,000; 13–16 November 2025	Pincho Fernández (ESP); Mario del Castillo (ESP); 6–4, 6–2	Federico Chiostri (ARG); Ramiro Pereyra (ARG)	Ana Domínguez (ESP); Aida Martínez (ESP); 6–3, 5–7, 6–4	Daiara Valenzuela (ARG); Raquel Piltcher (BRA)
FIP Bronze Ireland; Limerick, Ireland €10,000; 14–16 November 2025	Albin Olsson (SWE); Daniel Windahl (SWE); 7–6^{2}, 6–3	Santino Giuliani (ITA); Juan Manuel Lasgoity (ITA)	Lorena Vano (ITA); Xènia Clascà (ESP); 5–7, 7–5, 6–2	Rebeca López (ESP); Natividad López (ESP)
FIP Bronze LITAS Kaunas; Kaunas, Lithuania €7,000; 14–16 November 2025	Jaume Romera (ESP); Alberto García (ESP)^{3}6–7, 7–6^{7}, 6–3	Jose Luis González (ESP); Marco Cassetta (ITA)	Bo Luttikhuis (NED); Janine Hemmes (NED); 1–6, 6–3, 4–0^{rtd.}	Caterina Baldi (ITA); Clarissa Aima (ITA)
FIP Platinum Skechers; Veracruz, Mexico €120,000; 18–23 November 2025	Momo González (ESP); Fran Guerrero (ESP); 6–4, 1–6, 7–5	Edu Alonso (ESP); Juan Tello (ARG)	Aranzazu Osoro (ARG); Victoria Iglesias (ESP); 7–6^{3}, 6–1	Patricia Llaguno (ESP); Martina Fassio (ARG)
FIP Silver Napoli; Naples, Italy €20,000; 21–23 November 2025	Pincho Fernández (ESP); Mario del Castillo (ESP); 4–6, 6–3, 7–6^{6}	Andrés Fernández (ESP); Mario Ortega (ESP)	Araceli Martínez (ESP); Carolina Orsi (ITA); 4–6, 6–4, 7–6^{5}	Nuria Rodríguez (ESP); Marina Lobo (ESP)
FIP Bronze Lucena; Lucena, Spain €7,500; 21–23 November 2025	Cándido Alfaro (ESP); Adrián Naranjo (ESP); 6–4, 7–6^{6}	Marcos González (ESP); Pablo Sánchez (ESP)	Lorena Vano (ITA); Xènia Clascà (ESP); 6–4, 6–3	Teresa Moríñigo (ESP); Blanca Arriola (ESP)
FIP Bronze Qatar Doha II; Doha, Qatar €7,000; 21–23 November 2025	Simone Cremona (ITA); Sten Richters (NED); 6–4, 2–6, 6–3	Albin Olsson (SWE); Daniel Windahl (SWE)	Marcella Koek (NED); Rosalie van der Hoek (NED); 3–6, 6–3, 6–0	María Portillo (ESP); Lucía Pérez (ESP)
FIP Bronze Lyttos Crete III; Hersonissos, Greece €7,000; 21–23 November 2025	Youp de Kroon (NED); Julian Prins (NED); 7–5, 6–2	Gustavo Nunes (POR); José Solano (ESP)	Alba Pérez (ESP); Aimee Gibson (GBR); 6–0, 4–6, 6–2	Mónica Gómez (ESP); Claudia Escacena (ESP)
Premier Padel GNP Acapulco Major; Acapulco, Mexico €807,900; 24–30 November 2025	Arturo Coello (ESP); Agustín Tapia (ARG); 6–4, 7–6^{5}	Alejandro Galán (ESP); Federico Chingotto (ARG)	Claudia Fernández (ESP); Beatriz González (ESP); 6–2, 6–4	Gemma Triay (ESP); Delfina Brea (ARG)
FIP Silver Mediolanum Padel Cup Como; Como, Italy €20,000; 27–30 November 2025	Boris Castro (ESP); Diego Dorta (ESP); 6–4, 6–4	Alberto Gª Jiménez (ESP); Víctor Tur (ESP)	Mónica Gómez (ESP); Claudia Escacena (ESP); 6–3, 6–3	Martina Parmigiani (ITA); Giulia Sussarello (ITA)
FIP Bronze BBK Manama II; Manama, Bahrain €8,000; 28–30 November 2025	Pedro Araújo (POR); Youssef Hossam (EGY); 6–3, 6–1	Sergio Nieto (ESP); Ferrán González (ESP)	Alba Pérez (ESP); Aimee Gibson (GBR); 6–3, 6–1	Giorgia Rosi (ITA); Matilde Minelli (ITA)
FIP Silver Roeselare; Roeselare, Belgium €7,500; 28–30 November 2025	Adam Axelsson (SWE); Simon Vasquez (SWE); 6–4, 6–2	Clément Geens (BEL); Nacho Moragues (ESP)	No women's draw	
FIP Bronze Castellón II; Castellón de la Plana, Spain €7,000; 28–30 November 2025	Santi Pineda (ESP); Alfonso Sánchez (ESP); 6–1, 7–6^{1}	Marcos González (ESP); Pablo Sánchez (ESP)	Teresa Moríñigo (ESP); Blanca Arriola (ESP); 6–2, 6–3	María Portillo (ESP); Lucía Pérez (ESP)
FIP Bronze Lyttos Crete IV; Hersonissos, Greece €7,000; 28–30 November 2025	Simone Cremona (ITA); Sten Richters (NED); 6–4, 6–4	Simone Iacovino (ITA); Giulio Graziotti (ITA)	No women's draw	
FIP Bronze Roeselare; Roeselare, Belgium €3,500; 28–30 November 2025	No men's draw		Justine Pysson (BEL); Elyne Boeykens (BEL); 6–3, 6–3	Tia Norton (GBR); Helena Wyckaert (BEL)

=== December ===
Tournament	Men's winners	Men's runners-up	Women's winners	Women's runners-up
Cupra FIP Finals Shanghai; Shanghai, China €90,000; 3–6 December 2025	Jose Jiménez (ESP); Maxi Sánchez (ARG); 6–4, 3–6, 6–3	Javi Garrido (ESP); Álvaro Cepero (ESP)	Claudia Jensen (ARG); Aranzazu Osoro (ARG); 6–4, 6–2	Patricia Llaguno (ESP); Martina Fassio (ARG)
Qatar Airways Premier Padel Finals; Barcelona, Spain €600,000; 11–14 December 2025	Agustín Tapia (ARG); Arturo Coello (ESP); 6–7^{4, 6–3, 7–6^{4}}	Alejandro Galán (ESP); Federico Chingotto (ARG)	Claudia Fernández (ESP); Beatriz González (ESP); 6–4, 0–6, 6–3	Gemma Triay (ESP); Delfina Brea (ARG)

== See also ==
- International Padel Federation
- Premier Padel
- es:Premier Padel 2025
