= Balle à la main =

Traditional Picard sport

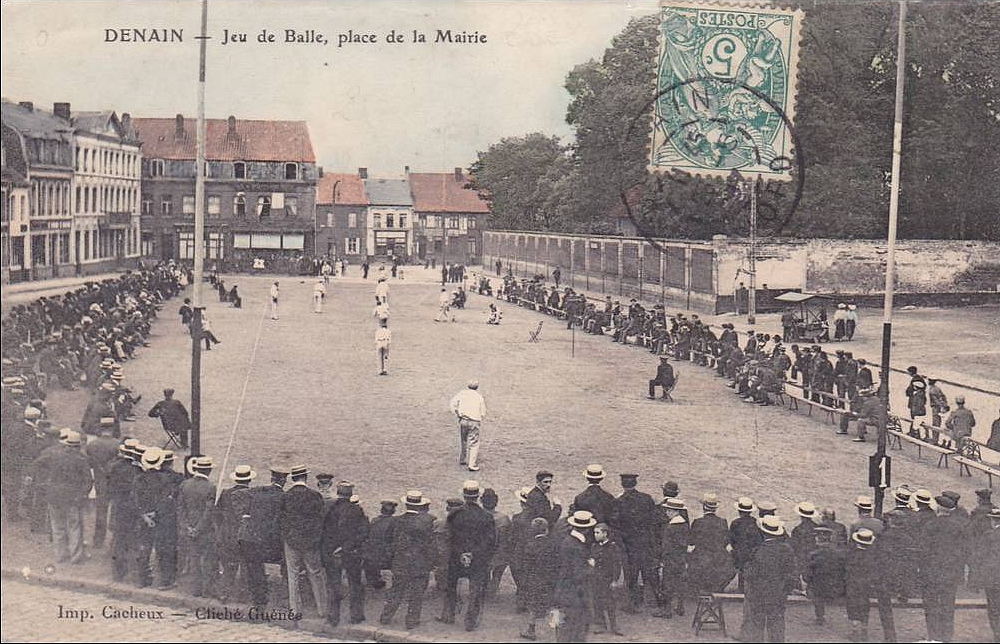
Balle à la main in Denain (Nord-France)

Balle à la main is a traditional Picard sport. It is a team sport with two teams of seven players on a called field "ballodrome". It is a game of gain-ground' as Longue paume, which takes place in Picardy. Balle à la main is played on a rectangular field of 65 meters by 12 meters. As all the ballodromes of the games of gain-ground, the field has a line of fire and a rope.

== Rules ==
The ball is made with a lead pit, surrounded with wool and covered with leather. The diameter is about 4,2 cm with a weight about 43 g.

The game takes place according to the rules of the games of gagne-terrain (gain-ground) with in particular the use of the "chasses". We play bare handed. Points for a set count by "fifteen" (15, 30, 45 and set), with possible advantage in the tie-break. A match takes place in 7 sets.

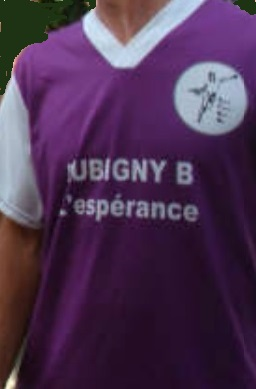
shirt of the team of Aubigny, Somme

== Sources ==
- (in French) Lazure, Marcel, Les jeux de balle et ballon picards: ballon au poing, balle à la main, balle au tamis, longue paume, Centre régional de documentation pédagogique de Picardie, Amiens, France, 1996.
