= Frisian handball =

Traditional Frisian sport

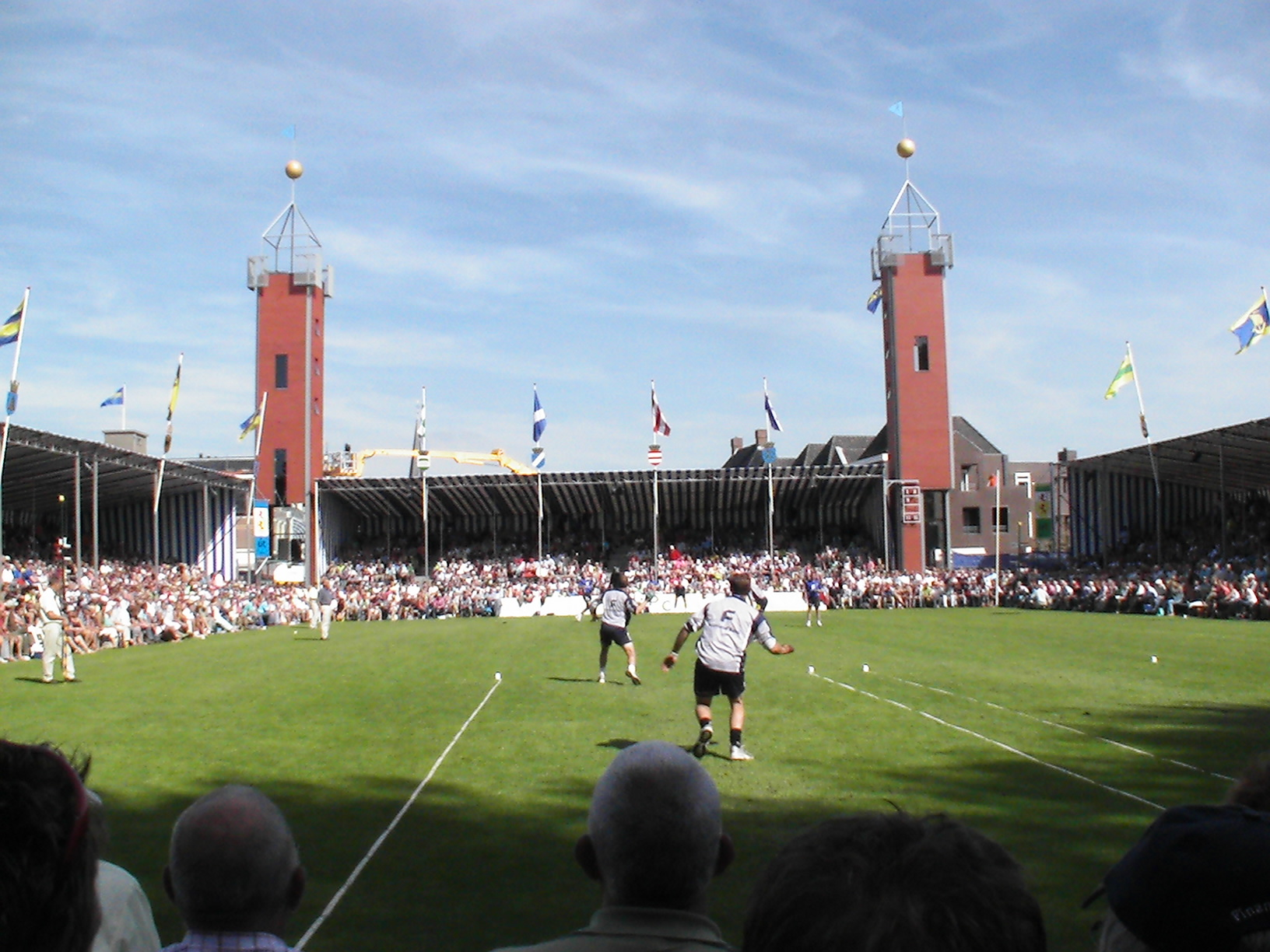
Frisian handball in Franeker

Frisian handball (West Frisian: keatsen; Dutch: kaatsen) is a traditional Frisian sport, similar to American handball and fives, that is most commonly practiced by people from the northern Dutch province of Friesland (Fryslân). It is believed to be one of the oldest ballgames and was an unofficial demonstration sport at the 1928 Summer Olympics in Amsterdam. The scoring is similar to tennis. The first team scoring six games wins the match.

== Rules ==
The major Frisian handball tournament, called the P.C. (short for Permanent Committee), has been held in the city of Franeker since 1854 and is considered the oldest regular sports tournament in the world.

Frisian handball is played on a rectangular lawn of 61 meters by 32 meters (a kaatsbaan in Dutch), by two teams composed of three players. In the centre of one short side of the field is a receiving zone of 5 meters by 19 meters defended by two players, the other team member remaining field player. One of the opponents serves the hard leather ball with his bare hand from a serving box at about 30 meters from the receiving zone. If he does not succeed in reaching the receiving zone, the receiving team gets a direct score. When the receiving team, of which the players are allowed to wear a single hardened leather glove, returns the ball over the short line behind the serving box (called the upper line, in West Frisian boppe) they also get a direct score. The serving team is allowed to prevent this happening by hitting or holding the ball before the upper line. The place where the ball remains after such a rally is marked with a small woodblock called a kaats, which is best defined as an undecided score. When two such undecided points occur (or one, if one of the teams is on game point) the teams change places. In the next rally, the team that then has the receiving position, tries to hit the ball past the first kaats and, if any, in the next rally past the second kaats, so deciding the undecided points. Then they start all over again.

In parts of Belgium, the similar game of jeu de balle-pelote is played. This game is played by teams of 5 players on a trapezium shaped field, mostly located on marketplaces. Indeed the place du Jeu de Balle of Brussels, named nowadays Vossenplein ("Foxes square") in Dutch, was once upon a time named Kaatsspelplaats in Dutch, as can be seen on old placename plates on that square.

== In geography ==
The Catskill Mountains in the Eastern United States derive their name from 'kaatsen'. The Dutch who settled the Hudson River area named the fields where indigenous people played their ballgames, 'kaatsbaan'. The name survived as Katsbaan, New York, part of the town of Saugerties. The creek that runs past Ka(a)tsbaan into the Hudson River, was named Kaatserskill ('kill' is an old Dutch word for creek, e.g. Dordtse Kil, Sluiskil), now Kaaters Kill. The creek's name then transferred to the mountain range from which it springs.

== See also ==
- Handball International Championships
- International game
