= History of tennis =

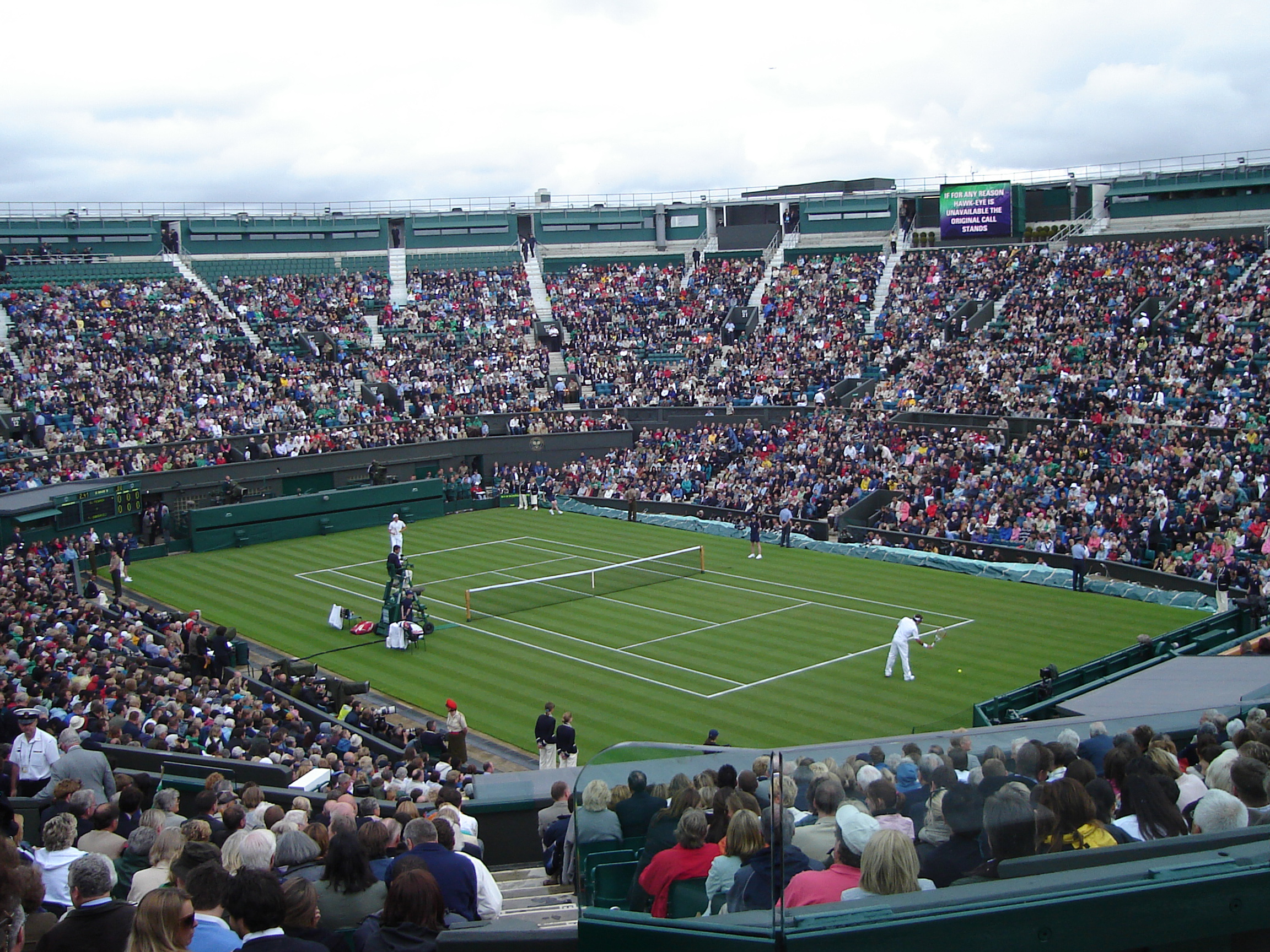
Players on Wimbledon's Centre Court in 2008, a year before the installation of a retractable roof

The racket sport traditionally named lawn tennis was invented in Edgbaston, Birmingham, England, and is now commonly known simply as tennis. It is the direct descendant of what is now known as real tennis or royal tennis, which continues to be played today as a separate sport with more complex rules.

Most rules of (lawn) tennis derive from this precursor and it is reasonable to see both sports as variations of the same game. Most historians believe that tennis originated in northern France in the 12th century, but the ball was then struck with the palm of the hand, hence the name jeu de paume (lit. 'game of the palm'). It was not until the 16th century that rackets came into use and the game began to be called 'tennis'. It was popular in the Kingdom of France as well as in England, where Henry VIII of England was a notable enthusiast of the game now referred to as real tennis.

By the late 19th century real tennis had a long history of rule codification, with Marylebone Cricket Club's 1872 Rules of Real Tennis regarded as the most authoritative. There was no such consensus for lawn tennis. As the new game began to spread in the early 1870s, several competing rulebooks emerged, causing confusion among players and clubs. In March 1875, an open meeting at Lord's was organised, resulting in the publication of the 1875 MCC Laws of Lawn Tennis in May. This code provided the foundations for the rules used at the first Wimbledon Championships in 1877. During the first Wimbledon Championships they used wooden racquets strung with strings made primarily from cow and sheep intestines. Though racquets have advanced over time, a form of these strings are still used today.

The Davis Cup, an annual competition between men's national teams, dates to 1900. The analogous competition for women's national teams, the Fed Cup, was founded as the Federation Cup in 1963 to celebrate the 50th anniversary of the founding of the International Tennis Federation, also known as the ITF. Promoter C. C. Pyle created the first modern professional tennis tour in 1926, with a group of American and French tennis players playing exhibition matches to paying audiences. The most notable of these early professionals were the American Vinnie Richards and the Frenchwoman Suzanne Lenglen. Players turning pro could not compete in the major (amateur) tournaments.

In the 1930s, a tennis‑like game called Miniten was developed within the naturist movement, played with a wooden bat on a smaller court.

In 1968 commercial pressures and rumours of some amateurs taking money under the table led to the abandonment of this distinction, inaugurating the Open Era, in which all players could compete in all tournaments and top players were able to make their living from tennis. With the beginning of the Open Era, the establishment of an international professional tennis circuit, and revenues from the sale of television rights, tennis's popularity has spread worldwide, and the sport has shed its upper/middle-class Anglophone image (although it is acknowledged that this stereotype still exists).

== Etymology ==
The word tennis came into use in English in the mid-14th century from French, via the Anglo-Norman term Tenez, which can be translated as 'hold!', 'receive!' or 'take!', a call from the server to his opponent indicating that he is about to serve. The first known appearance of the word in English literature is by poet John Gower in his poem titled 'In Praise of Peace' dedicated to King Henry IV and composed in 1400; "Of the tenetz to winne or lese a chase, Mai no lif wite er that the bal be ronne". (Whether a chase is won or lost at tennis, Nobody can know until the ball is run). (Note: The first known instance of the word tennis in the English language dates to 1396 when a William Terrey had to appear before the burghmote of Canterbury for allowing people to play le Closhe and le Tenesse on his ground.)

== Origin ==
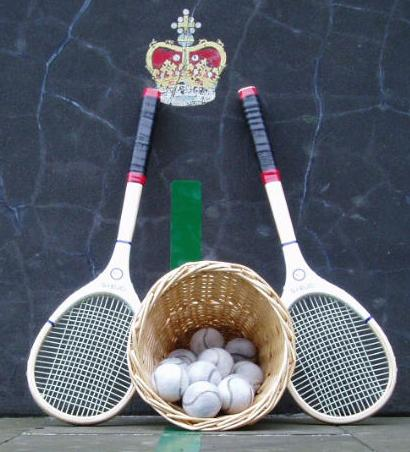
Real tennis racquets and balls. Cahusac at the Falkland Palace Royal Tennis Club.

References to tennis are found in literature dating back to the Middle Ages. In The Second Shepherds' Play (c. 1500), a tennis ball is listed among the three gifts which the shepherds give to the newborn Christ. In The Turke and Gowin (c. 1500) Sir Gawain, a knight of King Arthur's round table, plays tennis against a group of 17 giants.

=== Jeu de paume ===
Most historians believe that tennis originated in northern France in the 12th century, but the ball was then struck with the palm of the hand, hence the name jeu de paume (lit. 'game of the palm'). Originally it was played with a bare hand, and later with a glove. This game may have been played by monks in monastery cloisters, but the construction and appearance of courts more resemble medieval courtyards and streets than religious buildings.

=== Real tennis ===
By the 16th century the glove had become a racquet, the game had moved to an enclosed playing area and the rules had stabilised. This version of the game is known today as real tennis.

Real tennis quickly became a popular leisure pursuit for European royalty. In 1437 at the Blackfriars, Perth, the playing of tennis indirectly led to the death of King James I of Scotland, when the drain outlet, through which he hoped to escape assassins, had been blocked to prevent the loss of tennis balls. James was trapped and killed. Francis I of France (1515–1547) was an enthusiastic player and promoter of real tennis, building courts and encouraging play among the courtiers and commoners. His successor, Henry II (1547–59), was also an excellent player and continued the tradition. The deaths of two French kings can be linked to tennis—Louis X died of a severe chill after playing, while Charles VIII died after hitting his head either en route to a game, or, according to a tertiary source, during one. King Charles IX granted a constitution to the Corporation of Tennis Professionals in 1571, creating the first pro tennis 'tour', establishing three professional levels: apprentice, associate, and master. A professional named Forbet wrote and published the first codification of the rules in 1599.

In England, royal interest in the game began with Henry V (1413–22), but it was Henry VIII (1509–47) who made the biggest impact. As a young monarch he played the game with gusto at Hampton Court on a court he had built in 1530. It is believed that his second wife, Anne Boleyn, was watching a game of real tennis when she was arrested, and that Henry was playing when news was brought to him of her execution. By the reign of James I (1603–25), London had fourteen tennis courts.

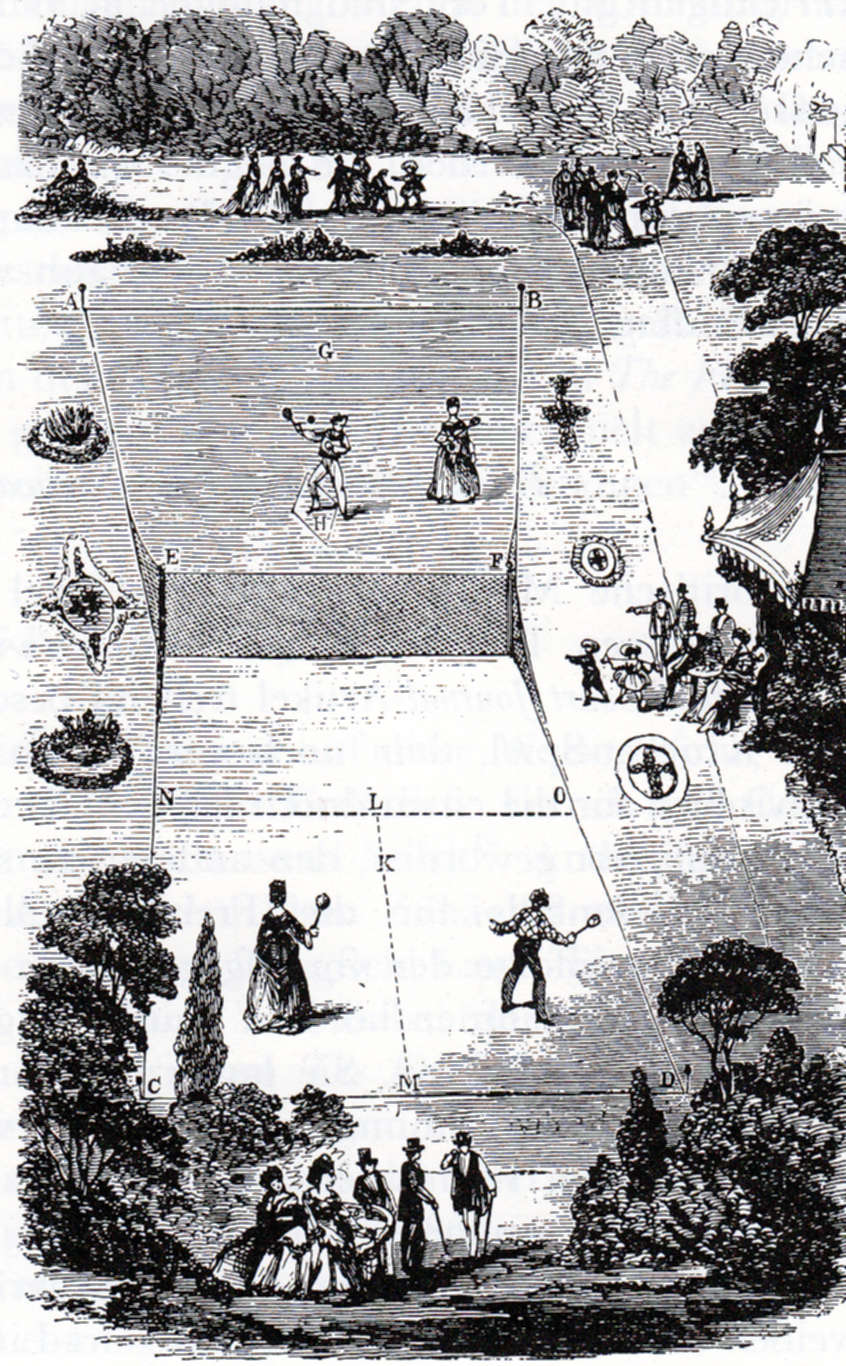
Drawing of a lawn tennis court as originally designed by Major Walter Clopton Wingfield in 1874

In 1555 an Italian priest, Antonio Scaino da Salothe, wrote the first known book about tennis, Trattato del Giuoco della Palla. More references to tennis are found in the literature of this period. Perhaps most famously, a basket of "tennis balles" is given to King Henry in William Shakespeare's Henry V (1599), in mockery of his youth and playfulness. Shakespeare appears to have read about this incident from some earlier chronicles and ballads. One of the earliest paintings to feature tennis is Giambattista Tiepolo's The Death of Hyacinth (1752–1753), which includes a strung racquet and three tennis balls. The theme of the painting is the mythological story of Apollo and Hyacinth as recounted in Ovid's Metamorphoses. Giovanni Andrea dell'Anguillara translated the Metamorphoses into Italian in 1561, and replaced the original text's references to ancient discus with the more contemporary game of tennis (Italian: pallacorda). Tiepolo's painting had been commissioned in 1752 by German count Wilhelm Friedrich Schaumburg Lippe, who was an avid tennis player.

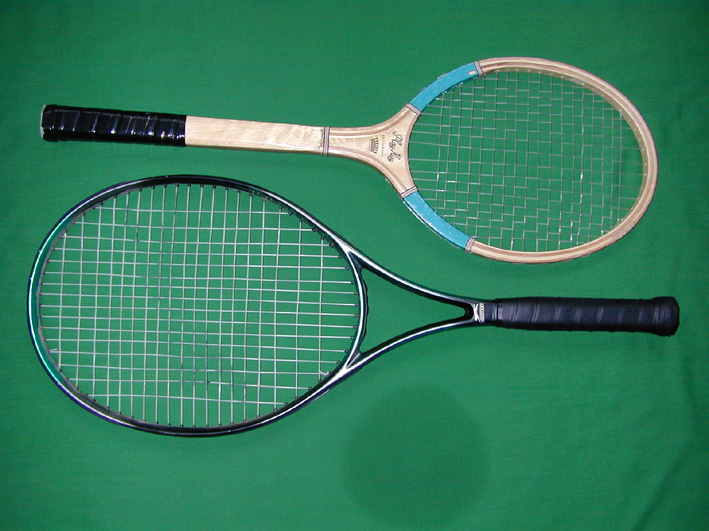
Tennis racquets made of wood and CFRP (carbon fibre reinforced plastics) side by side

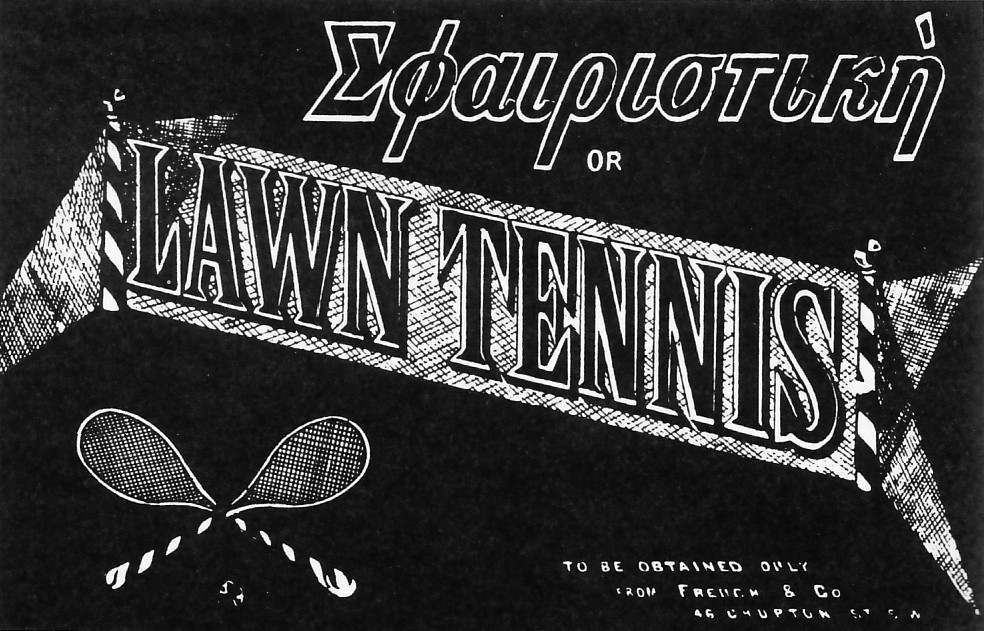
Cover of the first edition of a book about lawn tennis by Walter Clopton Wingfield, published in February 1874

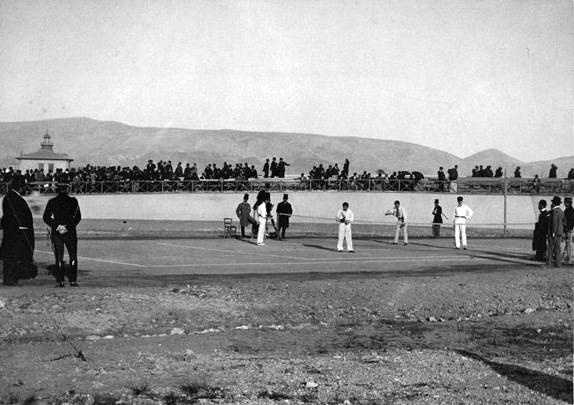
Tennis doubles final at the 1896 Olympic Games

The game thrived among seventeenth century nobility in France, Spain, Italy and the Austro-Hungarian Empire but suffered under English Puritanism. By the Age of Napoleon the royal families of Europe were besieged and real tennis was largely abandoned. Real tennis played a minor role in the history of the French Revolution, through the Tennis Court Oath (Serment du Jeu de Paume). On 20 June 1789, members of the Third Estate found themselves locked out of a meeting of the Estates-General and convened at a real tennis court near Versailles to sign this pledge, which formed a decisive early step in starting the revolution. The French Revolution also led to the decommissioning of many real tennis courts in France, as tennis fell out of vogue due to its aristocratic associations.

An epitaph in St Michael's Church, Coventry, written circa 1705 read, in part:

Here lyes an old toss'd Tennis Ball:
Was racketted, from spring to fall,
With so much heat and so much hast,
Time's arm for shame grew tyred at last.

In England, during the 18th and early 19th centuries as real tennis declined, three other racquet sports emerged: racquets, squash racquets and lawn tennis (the modern game). Many historic tennis courts have been preserved in the British Isles, including courts at Oxford, Cambridge, Falkland Palace in Fife where Mary Queen of Scots regularly played, and Hampton Court Palace.

== Birth of lawn tennis ==
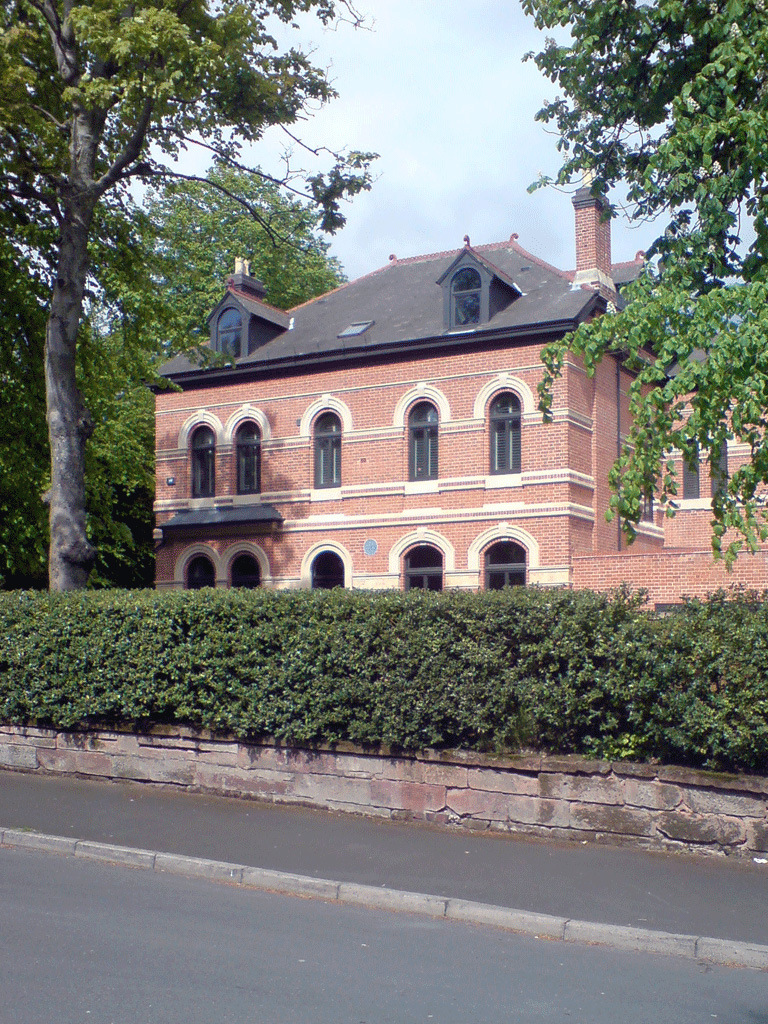
Augurio Perera's house in Edgbaston, Birmingham, where he and Harry Gem first played the modern game of lawn tennis

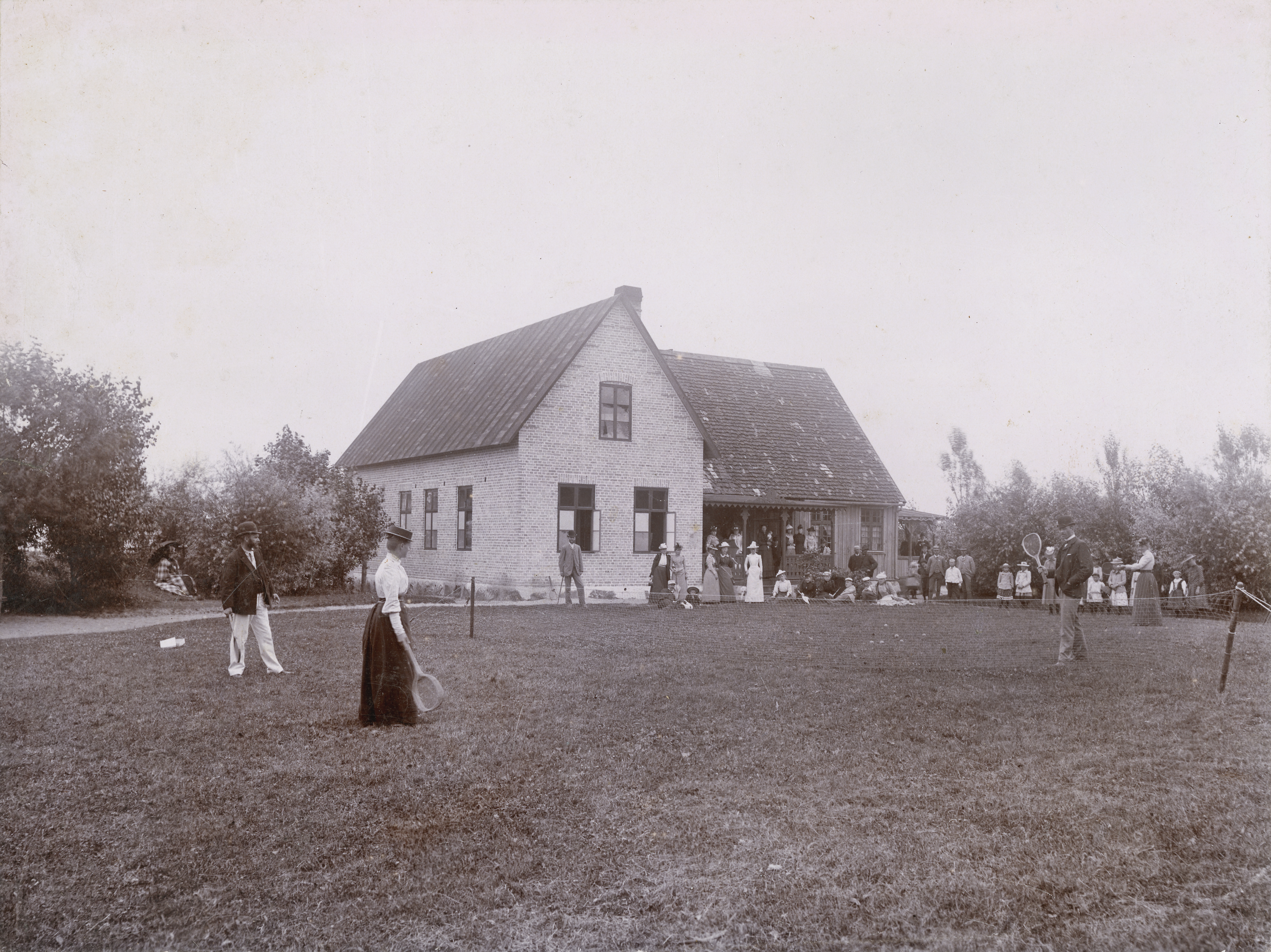
Amateur tennis match in Sweden, 1892

The lawyer and memoirist William Hickey recalled that in 1767 "in the summer we had another club, which met at the Red House in Battersea fields, nearly opposite Ranelagh.... The game we played was an invention of our own, and called field tennis, which afforded noble exercise.... The field, which was of sixteen acres in extent, was kept in as high an order, and smooth as a bowling green."

The modern sport is tied to two separate inventions.

Between 1859 and 1865, in Birmingham, England, Major Harry Gem, a solicitor, and his friend Augurio Perera, a Spanish merchant, combined elements of the game of racquets and a ball of wind and played it on a croquet lawn in Edgbaston. In 1872, both men moved to Leamington Spa and in 1874, with two doctors from the Warneford Hospital, founded the world's first tennis club, the Leamington Tennis Club.

In December 1873 Major Walter Clopton Wingfield designed an hourglass-shaped tennis court in order to obtain a patent on his court (as the rectangular court was already in use and was unpatentable). A temporary patent on this hourglass-shaped court was granted to him in February, 1874, which he never renewed when it expired in 1877. It is commonly believed, mistakenly, that Wingfield obtained a patent on the game he devised to be played on that type of court, but in fact Wingfield never applied for nor received a patent on his game, although he did obtain a copyright — but not a patent — on his rules for playing it. And, after a running series of articles and letters in the British sporting magazine The Field, and a meeting at London's Marylebone Cricket Club, the official rules of lawn tennis were promulgated by that Club in 1875, which preserved none of the aspects of the variations that Wingfield had dreamed up and named Sphaeristikè (Greek: σφαιριστική, that is, "sphere-istic", an ancient Greek adjective meaning "of or pertaining to use of a ball, globe or sphere"), which was soon corrupted to "sticky". Wingfield claimed that he had invented his version of the game for the amusement of his guests at a weekend garden party on his estate of Nantclwyd, in Llanelidan, Wales in 1874, but research has demonstrated that even his game was not likely played during that country weekend in Wales. He had likely based his game on both the evolving sport of outdoor tennis and on real tennis. Much of modern tennis terminology also derives from this period, for Wingfield and others borrowed both the name and much of the French vocabulary of real tennis, and applied them to their variations of real tennis. In the scholarly work Tennis: A Cultural History, Heiner Gillmeister reveals that on 8 December 1874, Wingfield had written to Harry Gem, commenting that he had been experimenting with his version of lawn tennis for a year and a half. Gem himself had largely credited Perera with the invention of the game.

Wingfield did patent his hourglass court in 1874, but not his eight-page rule book titled "Sphairistike or Lawn Tennis", but he failed in enforcing his patent. In his version, the game was played on an hourglass-shaped court, and the net was higher (4 feet 8 inches) than it is in official lawn tennis. The service had to be made from a diamond-shaped box in the middle of one side of the court only, and the service had to bounce beyond the service line instead of in front of it. He adopted the rackets-based system of scoring where games consisted of 15 points (called 'aces'). None of these quirks survived the Marylebone Cricket Club's 1875 Rules of Lawn Tennis that have been official, with periodic slight modifications, ever since then. Those rules were adopted by the All England Lawn Tennis and Croquet Club for the first Lawn Tennis Championship, at Wimbledon in 1877 (the men who devised those rules were members of both clubs). Wingfield does deserve great credit for popularizing the game of lawn tennis, as he marketed, in one boxed set, all the equipment needed to play his or other versions of it, equipment that had been available previously only at several different outlets. Because of this convenience, versions of the game spread in Britain, and by 1875 lawn tennis had virtually supplanted croquet and badminton as outdoor games for both men and women.

Mary Ewing Outerbridge played the game in Bermuda at Clermont, a house with a spacious lawn in Paget parish. Innumerable histories claim that in 1874, Mary returned from Bermuda on board the ship S.S. Canima and introduced lawn tennis to the United States, setting up supposedly the first tennis court in the United States on the grounds of the Staten Island Cricket and Baseball Club, which was near where the Staten Island Ferry Terminal is today. The club was founded on or about 22 March 1872. She is also mistakenly said to have played the first tennis game in the U.S. against her sister Laura in Staten Island, New York on an hourglass-shaped court. However, all this would have been impossible, as the tennis equipment she is said to have brought back from Bermuda was not available in Bermuda until 1875, and her next trip to Bermuda, when it was available there, was in 1877. In fact, lawn tennis was first introduced in the United States on a grass court on Col. William Appleton's Estate in Nahant, Massachusetts by Dr. James Dwight ("the Father of American Lawn Tennis"), Henry Slocum, Richard Dudley Sears and Sears' half-brother Fred Sears, in 1874.

== Terminology ==
Wingfield borrowed both the name and much of the French vocabulary of real tennis:

- Tennis comes from the French tenez, the formal imperative form of the verb tenir, to hold, meaning "hold!", "receive!" or "take!", an interjection used as a call from the server to his opponent to indicate that he is about to serve.
- Racket (or racquet) derives from the Arabic rāhat (al-yad), meaning the palm (of the hand).
- Deuce comes from "a deux du jeu" - two points away from game (that is, two consecutive points must be scored to win the game).
- The origin of the use of love for zero is disputed. It is ascribed to derive from l'œuf, French for "the egg", traditionally representing the shape of a zero. Another possibility is that it derives from the Dutch expression "iets voor lof doen", which means to do something for praise, implying no monetary stakes.
- The reason for the numbering of scores being "15", "30" and "40" is unknown. Historical sources suggest the system was originally 15, 30, 45 with the 45 simplified to 40 over time. Common theories are that it originated from the quarters of a clock, or from gambling stakes or just a trick from royal families to confuse the servants and maids so they would not understand the system of scoring.

== Tournaments and tours of the Amateur Era ==
=== Amateur tournaments ===
==== The Four Majors ====
The four majors or Grand Slam tournaments, the four biggest competitions on the tennis circuit, are Wimbledon, the US Open, the French Open, and the Australian Open. Since the mid-1920s they became and have remained the more prestigious events in tennis. Winning these four tournaments in the same year is called the Calendar Grand Slam (a term borrowed from bridge).

===== 1877: Wimbledon =====
The Championships, Wimbledon, were founded by the All England Lawn Tennis and Croquet Club in 1877 to raise money for the club. The first Championships were contested by 22 men and the winner received a Silver Gilt Cup proclaiming the winner to be "The All England Lawn Tennis Club Single Handed Champion of the World". The first Championships culminated a significant debate on how to standardize the rules. The following year, it was recognized as the official British Championships, although it was open to international competitors. In 1884 the Ladies Singles and Gentlemen's Doubles Championships were inaugurated, followed by the Ladies and Mixed Doubles in 1913.

Name
1877: The Championships

Surface
1877: Grass

Venue change
1877: Worple Road, Wimbledon
1922: Church Road, Wimbledon

===== 1881: U.S. Open =====
Tennis was first played in the U.S. on a grass court set up on the Estate of Col. William Appleton in Nahant, Massachusetts by James Dwight, Richard Dudley Sears and Fred Sears in 1874. In 1881, the desire to play tennis competitively led to the establishment of tennis clubs.

The first American National tournament was played in 1880 at the Staten Island Cricket and Baseball Club in New York. An Englishman named Otway Woodhouse won the singles match. There was also a doubles match which was won by a local pair. There were different rules at each club. The ball in Boston was larger than the one normally used in NY. On 21 May 1881, the United States National Lawn Tennis Association (now the United States Tennis Association) was formed to standardize the rules and organize competitions.

The U.S. National Men's Singles Championship, now the US Open, was first held in 1881 at Newport, Rhode Island. The U.S. National Women's Singles Championships were first held in 1887 in Philadelphia.

The tournament was made officially one of the tennis 'Majors' from 1924 by the International Lawn Tennis Federation (ILTF).

Name change
1881: U.S. National Championship
1968: U.S. Open

Surface change
1881: Grass
1975: Clay Har-Tru
1978: Hard DecoTurf
2020: Hard Laykold

Venue change (men's championship)
1881: Newport
1915: Forest Hills
1921: Germantown
1924: Forest Hills
1978: Flushing Meadows

===== 1891/1925: French Open =====
Tennis was predominantly a sport of the English-speaking world, dominated by Great Britain and the United States. It was also popular in France, where the French Open dates to 1891 as the Championat de France International de Tennis. This tournament was not recognised as a Major or Grand Slam tournament until it was opened to all nationalities in 1925.

Name change
1891: Championnat de France
1925: Championnats Internationaux de France
1928: Tournoi de Roland Garros

Surface change
1891: Clay and Sand
1909: Clay

Venue change
1891–1908: shared by Tennis Club de Paris/Ile de Puteaux, Paris/Racing Club de France
1909: Societe Athletique de la Villa Primrose, Bordeaux
1910: Racing Club de France, Paris
1925: Stade Français, Paris
1926: Racing Club de France, Paris
1927: Stade Français, Paris
1928: Stade Roland Garros, Paris

===== 1905: Australian Open =====
The Australian Open was first played in 1905 as The Australasian (Australia and New Zealand) Championships. Because of its geographic remoteness, historically, the event did not gain attendance from the top tennis players. It became one of the major tennis tournaments starting in 1924 (designated by the ILTF). In 1927, because of New Zealand tennis authorities releasing their commitments to the tournament, it became known as the Australian Championships. For most of the 1970s and the early 1980s, the event lacked participation from top ranked tennis professionals. Since its move to Melbourne Park in 1988, the Australian Open has gained the popularity of the other three majors.

Name change
1905: Australasian Championships
1927: Australian Championships
1969: Australian Open

Surface change
1905: Grass
1988: Hard Rebound Ace
2008: Hard Plexicushion
2020: Hard GreenSet

Venue change
1905–1923: alternated irregularly between Melbourne, Brisbane, Sydney, Perth (3 events each), Adelaide (2 events), Christchurch, and Hastings (1 event each) (Note: Not held in 1916–1918.)
1924–1955: alternated cyclically between Melbourne, Sydney, and Adelaide (9 events each) (Note: The order was reversed in 1935–1936 between Melbourne and Adelaide and in 1947–1948 between Sydney and Melbourne. Not held in 1941–1945.)
1956–1969: alternated cyclically between Brisbane, Melbourne (4 events each), Sydney, and Adelaide (3 events each) (Note: The order was reversed in 1968–1969 between Melbourne and Brisbane.)
1970: White City Tennis Club, Sydney
1972: Kooyong
1988: Melbourne Park

==== The Davis Cup ====
In 1898, Dwight F. Davis of the Harvard University tennis team designed a tournament format with the idea of challenging the British to a tennis showdown. The first match, between the United States and Great Britain was held in Boston, Massachusetts in 1900. The American team, of which Dwight Davis was a part, surprised the British by winning the first three matches. By 1905 the tournament had expanded to include Belgium, Austria, France, and Australasia, a combined team from Australia and New Zealand that competed jointly until 1913.

The tournament initially was known as the International Lawn Tennis Challenge. It was renamed the Davis Cup following the death of Dwight Davis in 1945. The tournament has vastly expanded and, on its 100th anniversary in 1999, 130 nations competed.

==== International Tennis Federation ====
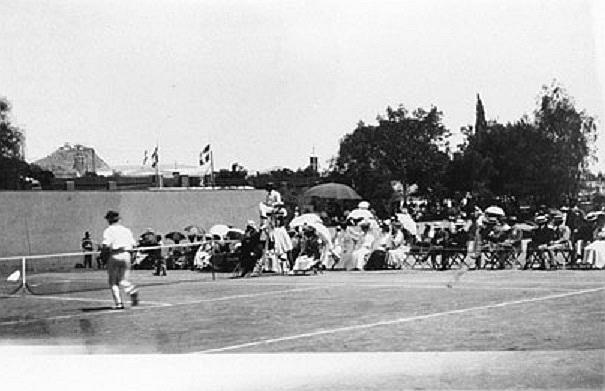
1896 Summer Olympics men's singles final

1913 also saw 12 national tennis associations agree at a Paris conference to form the International Lawn Tennis Federation (ILTF), renamed in 1977 as the current International Tennis Federation (ITF). The rules the association promulgated in 1924 have remained remarkably stable in the ensuing century, the one major change being the addition of the tie-break system designed by James Van Alen.

The same year, tennis withdrew from the Olympics after the 1924 Games but returned 60 years later as a 21-and-under demonstration event in 1984. This reinstatement was credited by the efforts by the then ITF President Philippe Chatrier, ITF General Secretary David Gray and ITF Vice President Pablo Llorens as well as support from IOC President Juan Antonio Samaranch. The success of the event was overwhelming, and the IOC decided to reintroduce tennis as a full medal sport at Seoul in 1988.

==== The Fed Cup ====
The idea of a Davis Cup-style tournament for national women's teams is surprisingly old—it was first proposed in 1919 by Hazel Hotchkiss Wightman. After she was turned down, she donated a trophy in 1923 that would be known as the Wightman Cup, awarded in an annual match between the two strongest women's tennis nations of the time, the United States and Great Britain.

Wightman's original idea for a worldwide women's team tournament would bear fruit more than 40 years later in 1962, when Nell Hopman persuaded the ITF to begin sponsoring such an event. The first Federation Cup was played in 1963 as part of the ITF's 50th anniversary celebrations; it involved 16 countries and was played over one week. By the 1990s, over 70 nations competed each year, and regional qualifiers were introduced in 1992. In 1995, the ITF introduced a new Davis Cup-style format for the competition and rechristened it the Fed Cup.

=== The professional circuit ===
In 1926, promoter C.C. Pyle established the first professional tour with a group of American and French players playing exhibition matches to paying audiences. The most notable early professionals were American Vinnie Richards and Frenchwoman Suzanne Lenglen. Players turning pro could not compete in the major (amateur) tournaments.

Before the Open Era, the leading professional players were under contract with a professional promoter who controlled their appearances. For example, in 1926, Lenglen and Richards toured North America along with Paul Féret and Mary K. Browne under contract to Charles C. Pyle. The main events of the professional circuit comprised head-to-head competition and by-invitation Pro Championships, which were the equivalent of the Grand Slam tournaments on the professional circuit.

Suzanne Lenglen was the leading player in the first year of the professional circuit, and after she retired in February 1927, few female players played on the professional circuit before the Open Era.

==== Pro tours ====
In the years before the Open Era, professionals often played more frequently on head-to-head tours than in tournaments because tours paid much better than tournaments and the number of professional tournaments was small. For example, Fred Perry earned U.S. $91,000 ($2,038,021 today) in a 1937 North American tour against Ellsworth Vines but won only U.S. $450 ($10,293) for his 1938 victory at the U.S. Pro Tennis Championships. Vines probably never entered a tournament in 1937 and 1938. In 1937, Vines played 70 matches on two tours and no tournament matches. Even in the 1950s, some professionals continued to play tour matches. During his first five months as a professional (January through May 1957), Ken Rosewall played 76 matches on a tour against Pancho Gonzales but only 9 tournament matches. Joe McCauley determined that for 1952, only 7 professional tournaments were played by the top international players, and 2 other professional tournaments (the British Pro and the German Pro) were reserved for domestic players. Only during the 1960s did professional tournaments become more significant than tours.

==== Pro Championships (Pro Slams) ====
In addition to head-to-head events several annual professional tournaments were called championship tournaments. The most prestigious was usually the Wembley Championship, held at the Wembley Arena in England, played between 1934 and 1990. The oldest was the U.S. Pro Tennis Championships, played between 1927 and 1999. Between 1954 and 1962, it was played indoors in Cleveland and was called the World Professional Championships. The third major tournament was the French Pro Championship, played between 1930 and 1968. The British and American championships continued into the Open Era but devolved to the status of minor tournaments after the late 1960s.

The Tournament of Champions was held between 1957 and 1959, the 1957 Australian editions taking place in Sydney White City and Melbourne Kooyong, while the U.S. editions in 1957, 1958 and 1959 took place at Forest Hills, Queens. There was also the Wimbledon Pro tournament held in August 1967, the first tournament where professional tennis players were allowed to play at Wimbledon.

== Open Era ==
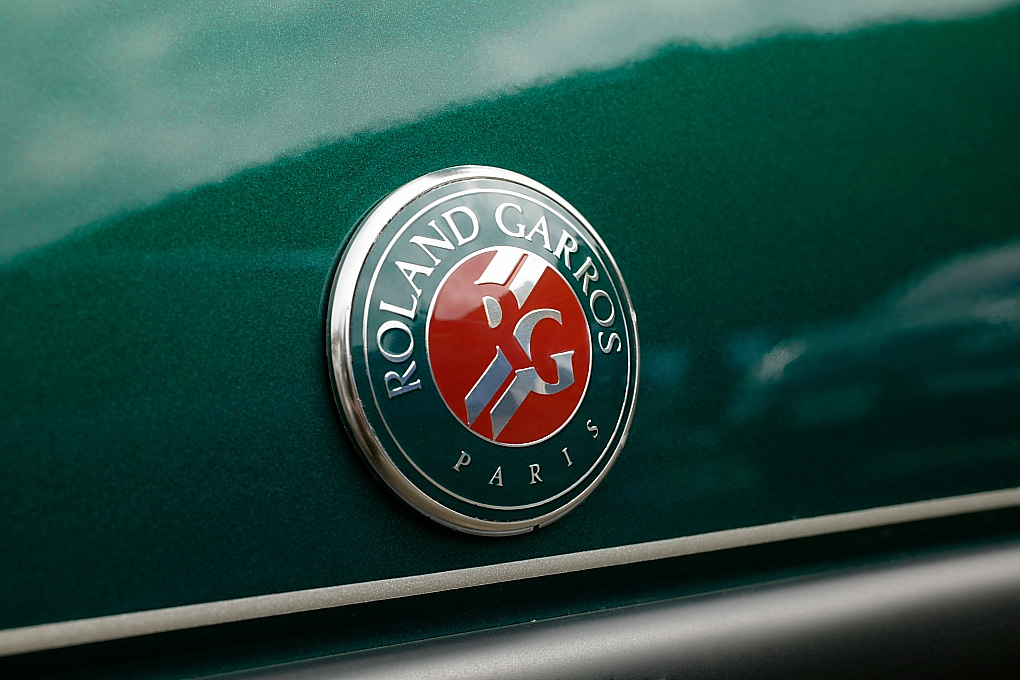
The French Championships at Roland Garros was the first Grand Slam tournament to become "open" to professionals.

The Open Era began in April 1968 when Grand Slam tournaments agreed to open their events to allow professional players to compete with amateurs.

Before 1968, only amateurs were allowed to compete in Grand Slam tournaments and other events organized or sanctioned by the ILTF, including the Davis Cup.

The move is made because the English are tired of the hypocrisy in the sport, the shamateurism that plagues high-class tennis. It is well known that amateurs bargain for – and receive – exorbitant expenses to compete at many tournaments.

"We must take action on our own account to make the game honest", said Derek Penmam of the British association. "For too long now we have been governed by a set of amateur rules that are quite unenforceable."

During the first years of the Open Era, power struggles between the ILTF and the commercial promoters led to boycotts of Grand Slam events. The first Open Era event was the 1968 British Hard Court Championships held in April at The West Hants Club in Bournemouth, England, while the first open Grand Slam tournament was the 1968 French Open in May. Both tournaments were won by Ken Rosewall. The Open Era allowed all tennis players the opportunity to make a living by playing tennis.

=== National Tennis League (NTL) and World Championship Tennis (WCT) ===
In 1968, a few professionals were independent, including Lew Hoad, Mal Anderson, Luis Ayala, and Owen Davidson, but most of the best players were under contract. George McCall operated the National Tennis League (NTL) and managed Rod Laver, Ken Rosewall, Andrés Gimeno, Pancho Gonzales, Fred Stolle and Roy Emerson. Meanwhile, Dave Dixon (later succeeded by Lamar Hunt) ran the World Championship Tennis (WCT) and managed the "Handsome Eight": John Newcombe, Tony Roche, Nikola Pilić, Roger Taylor, Pierre Barthès, Earl "Butch" Buchholz, Cliff Drysdale and Dennis Ralston. In 1968, none of the original Handsome Eight WCT players participated in the French Open. In 1970, NTL players did not play in the Australian Open because their organization did not receive a guarantee. In 1970, neither WCT nor NTL players played in the French Open.

=== Grand Prix circuit ===
In the first two years of the Open Era, the National Tennis League and WCT promoters began to take control of the game. To outmaneuver them, Jack Kramer, the best player of the late 1940s / early 1950s, and at that time a promoter, conceived the Grand Prix tennis circuit in late 1969. He described it as:

. . . a series of tournaments with a money bonus pool that would be split up on the basis of a cumulative point system. This would encourage the best players to compete regularly in the series, so that they could share in the bonus at the end and qualify for a special championship tournament that would climax the year.

In 1970, none of the contract players participated in the French Open. The International Lawn Tennis Federation, alarmed by the control of the promoters, approved Kramer's Grand Prix. Twenty-seven tournaments, including the three Grand Slams (French Open, Wimbledon and US Open), were played that year, with Stockholm tournament ending on 1 November. The independent professional players along with a few contract players, entered the Grand Prix circuit. Contract players could play Grand Prix events provided their contracts allowed it, and that they had adequate time apart from their own circuit.

=== Tour rivalries and the creation of the Association of Tennis Professionals (ATP) ===
The first WCT tournaments were held in February 1968 and the first NTL tournaments in March 1969. In July 1970, the WCT absorbed the NTL. At the end of 1970, a panel of journalists ranked the players, leading the WCT to send invitations to the 32 top men to play the 1971 WCT circuit: among the 32, Ilie Năstase, Stan Smith, Jan Kodeš, Željko Franulović and Clark Graebner stayed independent. In 1971, the WCT ran 20 tournaments, and concluded the year with the WCT Finals. In 1971, the majority of the best players still mainly played the WCT circuit. Thus, the 1971 Australian Open was a WCT competition whereas the French Open, Wimbledon and U.S. Open were ILTF Grand Prix events.

By then, the rivalry between the two groups became so intense that Rosewall, Gimeno, Laver, Emerson and some other WCT players boycotted the 1971 US Open (although Newcombe played and lost in the first round to Kodes). Bill Riordan (the future manager of Jimmy Connors) complicated matters further with a third professional tour, the U.S. Indoor Circuit. In 1972, the conflict between the ILTF and the WCT culminated in the ILTF banning the contract professional players from all ILTF Grand Prix events between January and July, which included the 1972 French Open and 1972 Wimbledon.

At the 1972 US Open in September, all the players attended and agreed to form a player syndicate to protect themselves from the promoters and associations, resulting in the creation of the Association of Tennis Professionals (ATP). In 1973, there were four rival professional circuits: the WCT circuit, the Grand Prix circuit, the U.S. Indoor Circuit with Connors and Ilie Năstase and the European Spring Circuit with Năstase as their star. During the year, the ILTF banned Nikola Pilić from 1973 Wimbledon, due to Pilic's alleged refusal to play in Yugoslavia's Davis Cup tie against New Zealand. In retaliation, 81 out of 84 of Pilic's fellow players who were ATP members, boycotted 1973 Wimbledon in response, stating that professional players should have the right of deciding whether to play Davis Cup matches or not. The only ATP players who refused to boycott 1973 Wimbledon were Ilie Năstase, Roger Taylor and Ray Keldie. They were later fined by the ATP for their participation in the tournament.

Between 1974 and 1978, any tennis player who participated in the nascent World TeamTennis, which conflicted with the European leg of the Grand Prix circuit, was banned by the French Tennis Federation from playing in the French Open in the same calendar year.

=== Integration ===
In 1978 the ILTF Grand Prix and WCT circuits merged. However, In 1982, the WCT circuit separated again and created a more complex WCT ranking, similar to the ATP ranking. The WCT was not as successful in the 1980s, and the Grand Prix circuit became the primary circuit. The Grand Prix's governance was led by the Men's International Professional Tennis Council (also called the Men's Tennis Council). The WCT Finals in Dallas continued being held until the end of the 1980s, and then disbanded with the creation of the ATP Tour for 1990.

The Open Era, the global professional circuit, and television helped tennis spread globally and shed its elitist, anglocentric image. In the United States, since the 1970s, courts have been a common feature of public recreational facilities. Accordingly, in the 1970s, the U.S. Open moved from the private West Side Tennis Club to a public park (the USTA National Tennis Center, Flushing Meadows Park) that is accessible to anyone who buys a ticket. About the same time, the ruling body's name changed from the United States Lawn Tennis Association to the United States Tennis Association.

=== ATP Tour ===
In 1990, the Association of Tennis Professionals, led by Hamilton Jordan, replaced the MTC as the governing body of men's professional tennis. They established the ATP Tour, and packaged the nine most prestigious events as the "Championship Series – Single Tournament Week", and beginning in 1996, as the "Super Nine". Twelve of the Grand Prix which were slightly less prestigious than the first nine events were renamed as the "Championship Series – Double Week" (meaning in most cases, 2 of those tournaments occurred the same week). Winning a Super Nine tournament was worth roughly half the points (370) of winning a Grand Slam tournament (750), while Championship Series tournaments were worth as much as 360 points depending on the total prize money. The format continued until 2000, at which time the Super Nine were renamed the Masters Series (the winner being awarded 500 points), occupying the rank below the Grand Slams (1000 points for the winner), and the Championship Series was renamed to simply the International Series Gold (worth 250 to 300 points for the winner). In 2000, the Grand Slam tournaments and the Masters Series tournaments became mandatory professional events if a player's ranking qualifies them for the tournament. Players were automatically entered and Masters and Slam events became the baseline for player rankings with up to an additional five tournaments also counted (18 in all plus the ATP Finals if they qualify). Before 2000, a players' best 14 tournaments were counted towards the ATP Point Rankings.

In 2009, the Masters events were renamed the ATP World Tour Masters 1000 with the Monte-Carlo Masters becoming a non-mandatory event, meaning a player could use his results from a lower-level tournament in place of it. International Series Gold became the ATP World Tour 500 and the remaining events became the ATP World Tour 250. The numbers in the tournament type name indicate the winners' ranking points. By way of comparison, a winner of one of the four Grand Slam tournaments is awarded 2000 points. In 2009, a greater emphasis began to be placed on winning a tournament, as the points awarded to the runner-up dropped from 70% of the champion's points to 60% (i.e. from 700 points to 600 points in a Masters 1000 event). Points also began to be awarded for Davis Cup singles play.

== Women's professional tennis ==
Women's professional tennis began in 1926, when world number one female player Suzanne Lenglen accepted $50,000 for a series of matches against three-time U.S. Champion Mary K. Browne. The series ended in 1927, and the women did not compete as professionals again until 1941 when Alice Marble headlined a tour against Mary Hardwick. World War II hindered most professional competitions and many players were involved with entertaining the troops.

In 1947, women professionals were again in action with a short-lived series of exhibition matches between Pauline Betz and Sarah Palfrey Cooke, both U.S. National Champions. In 1950 and 1951, Bobby Riggs signed Betz and Gussie Moran to play a pro tour with Jack Kramer and Pancho Segura, wherein Betz dominated Moran. Althea Gibson turned professional in 1958 and joined with Karol Fageros ("the Golden Goddess") as the opening act for the Harlem Globetrotters for one season.

There was virtually no further women's professional tennis until 1967, when promoter George McCall signed Billie Jean King, Ann Jones, Françoise Dürr, and Rosie Casals to join his tour of eight men for two years. The professional women then played as independents as the Open Era began.

In 1970, promoter for the Pacific Southwest Championships in Los Angeles Jack Kramer offered the women only $7,500 in prize money versus the men's total of $50,000. When Kramer refused to match the men's prize money, King and Casals urged the other women to boycott.

Gladys Heldman, American publisher of World Tennis magazine, responded with a separate women's tour under the sponsorship of Virginia Slims cigarettes. In 1971 and 1972, the WT Women's Pro Tour offered nearly 10 times the prize money of other pro women's tennis events. The USLTA initially would not sanction the tour; however, the two groups determined to give Virginia Slims the individual events, and the USLTA the tour, thus resolving the conflict. In 1973, the U.S. Open made history by offering equal prize money to men and women. Billie Jean King, the most visible advocate for the women's cause, earned over $100,000 in 1971 and 1972.

In the famous Battle of the Sexes exhibition match against the vocally sexist Bobby Riggs in September 1973, King brought even more media attention to tennis, and to women professionals in all walks of life by beating Riggs.

The Women's Tennis Association, formed in 1973, is the principal organizing body of women's professional tennis, organizing the worldwide, professional WTA Tour. From 1984 to 1998, the finals matches of the championship event were best-of-five, uniquely among women's tournaments. In 1999, the finals reverted to best-of-three. The WTA Tour Championships are generally considered to be the women's fifth most prestigious event (after the four Grand Slam tournaments.) Sponsors have included Virginia Slims (1971–78), Avon (1979–82), Virginia Slims again (1983–94), J.P. Morgan Chase (1996–2000), Sanex (2001) Home Depot (2002), Sony Ericsson (2006–2010), and Hologic (2022–present)

== Men's professional tennis ==
Men's professional tennis has developed significantly over the course of this sport's history, shaped by the achievements and influence of many players.

Prominent tennis stars from different decades include Jimmy Connors, who rose to prominence during the 1970s and maintained a leading presence in men's tennis throughout this decade. Ivan Lendl was active primarily during the 1980s. He held the world No. 1 ranking numerous times between 1981 and 1990 and later pursued a successful career as a coach. The 1990s were largely defined by Pete Sampras, who achieved the year-end world No. 1 ranking for six consecutive seasons, a record-setting accomplishment at the time. In the early 21st century, Roger Federer emerged as a dominant player, finishing five seasons as the year-end No. 1 between 2001 and 2010 and well known as one of the most accomplished players.

Year ranked #1	Name
1968–1970	Rod Laver
1971	Ken Rosewall
1972	Ilie Năstase
1973	Tom Okker
1974	Björn Borg
1975	Arthur Ashe
1976	Jimmy Connors
1977	Guillermo Vilas
1978–1979	Björn Borg
1980	John McEnroe
1981–1986	Ivan Lendl
1990–1991	Stefan Edberg
1992–1995	Pete Sampras
1996	Goran Ivanišević
1997	Patrick Rafter
1998	Marcelo Ríos
1999	Andre Agassi
2000	Marat Safin
2001–2002	Lleyton Hewitt
2003–2006	Roger Federer
2007–2008	Rafael Nadal
2009	Novak Djoković
2010	Rafael Nadal

== International Tennis Hall of Fame ==
In 1954, James Van Alen founded the International Tennis Hall of Fame, a non-profit museum in Newport, Rhode Island. The building contains a large collection of memorabilia as well as honoring prominent players and others. Each year, a grass-court tournament takes place on its grounds, as well as an induction ceremony honoring new members.

== See also ==
- Doping in tennis
- Match fixing in tennis
- Tennis technology
- Tennis at the Summer Olympics
