= O-We-Go =

Defunct American motor vehicle manufacturer

O-We-Go Car Company
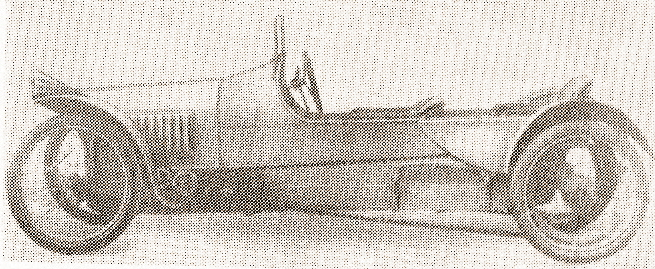
- 1914 O-We-Go
- Company type: Automobile manufacturer
- Founded: February, 1914; 112 years ago
- Defunct: January, 1915; 111 years ago
- Fate: Bankruptcy
- Headquarters: Owego, New York, United States
- Key people: Charles B. Hatfield, Jr.
- Products: Cyclecars
- Production output: 300 (approx) (1914)

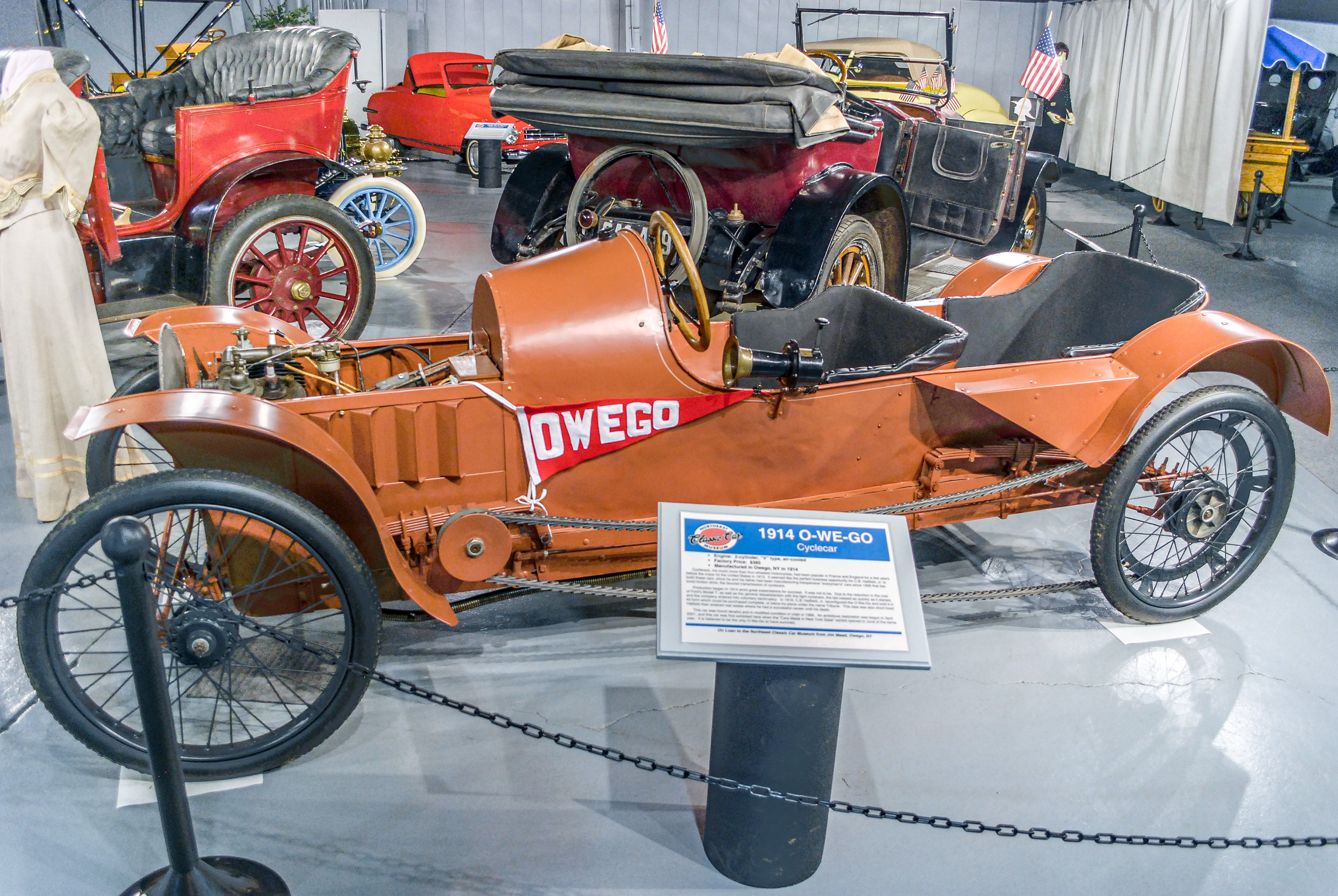
The only known surviving O-We-Go, a 1914 model, which is currently on display at the Northeast Classic Car Museum.

The O-We-Go was an American Cyclecar manufactured in 1914 in Owego, New York.

== History ==
Designed by Charles B. Hatfield, Jr. of the Hatfield Auto Truck Company in Elmira, New York, the O-We-Go prototype cyclecar was tested for 3 months before production in Owego, New York began in 1914.

The O-We-Go had a 12-hp twin-cylinder Ives motorcycle engine with a friction transmission on a 104-inch wheelbase. The tandem-seat automobile sold for $385, equivalent to $12,375 in 2025. The "cyclecar craze" faded as quickly as it started, and the company entered into voluntary bankruptcy in January 1915.

In 1916, C.B. Hatfield, Jr. reconfigured the O-We-Go and sold it in kit form which could be purchased complete, or piece-by-piece under the name Tribune. The only known surviving O-We-Go is currently on display at the Northeast Classic Car Museum.

== See also ==
- O-We-Go By Jim Donnelly from the March 2010 issue of Hemmings Classic Car
