= Edgbaston Archery and Lawn Tennis Society =

Coordinates: 52.466050°N 1.931207°W

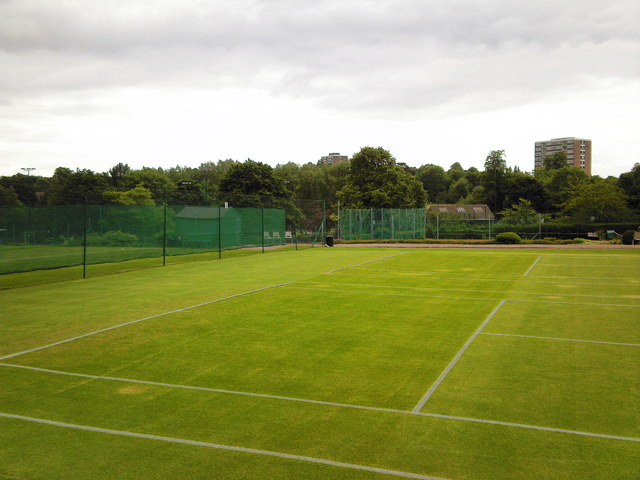

Edgbaston Archery and Lawn Tennis Society, informally known as The Archery and based in the Edgbaston area of Birmingham, England, is the oldest lawn tennis club in the world.

The Society was founded as the Edgbaston Archery Society in 1860 following meetings at the Birmingham and Midland Institute and the Old Library, Union Street, Birmingham. The original grounds were in Hall Hill Road (now Edgbaston Park Road), Edgbaston. The Society moved to its current premises next to Birmingham Botanical Gardens in 1867. The game of croquet was introduced from 1870, with the society's name being amended to reflect this.

It is not known exactly when tennis was established as part of the club's activities. A forerunner of the game was developed by Harry Gem and his friend Augurio Perera at the latter's home in Ampton Road, Edgbaston as early as 1859, but although Gem was a member of The Archery from 1864 to 1867 (his wife was member also from 1864 to 1872) there is no proof that he directly introduced the game to the club in this period, and the short-lived tennis club that Gem and Perera established in Leamington Spa in 1874 is the first that can be shown to have existed. The Archery's fixture card for 1875 shows tennis to have been well-established by this date, however, which makes The Archery the oldest still to survive.
