= Hatfield Motor Vehicle Company =

Historical automotive manufacturer in Ohio, United States

Hatfield Auto Truck Company
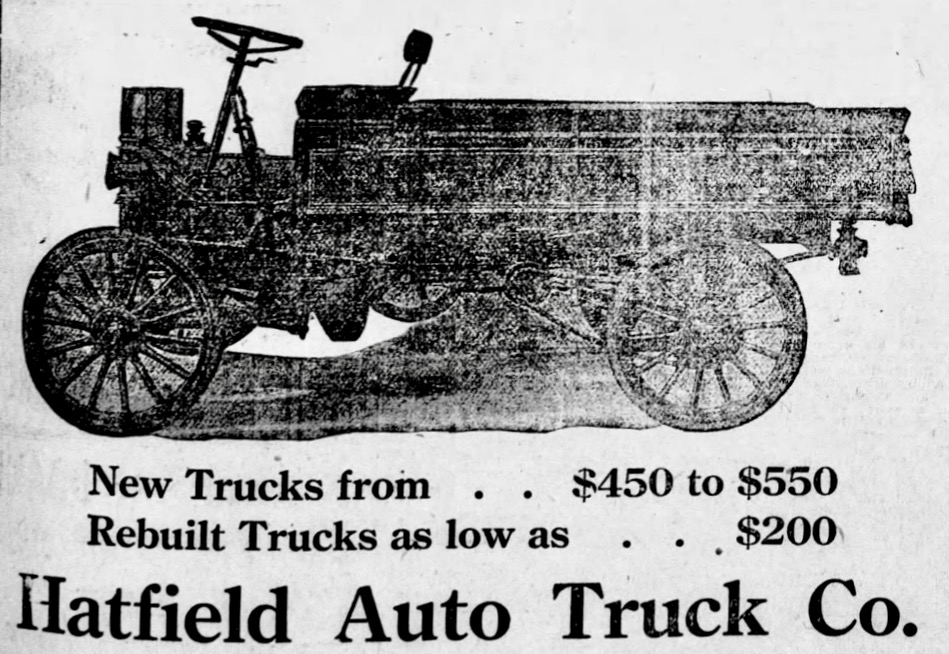

Overview
- Manufacturer: Hatfield Motor Vehicle Company
- Production: 1907-8

Powertrain
- Engine: air-cooled two-cylinder four-stroke engine
- Transmission: friction transmission

Dimensions
- Wheelbase: (38 in {96.5 cm} front, 40 in {102 cm} back)

Chronology
- Successor: Hatfield Auto Truck Company

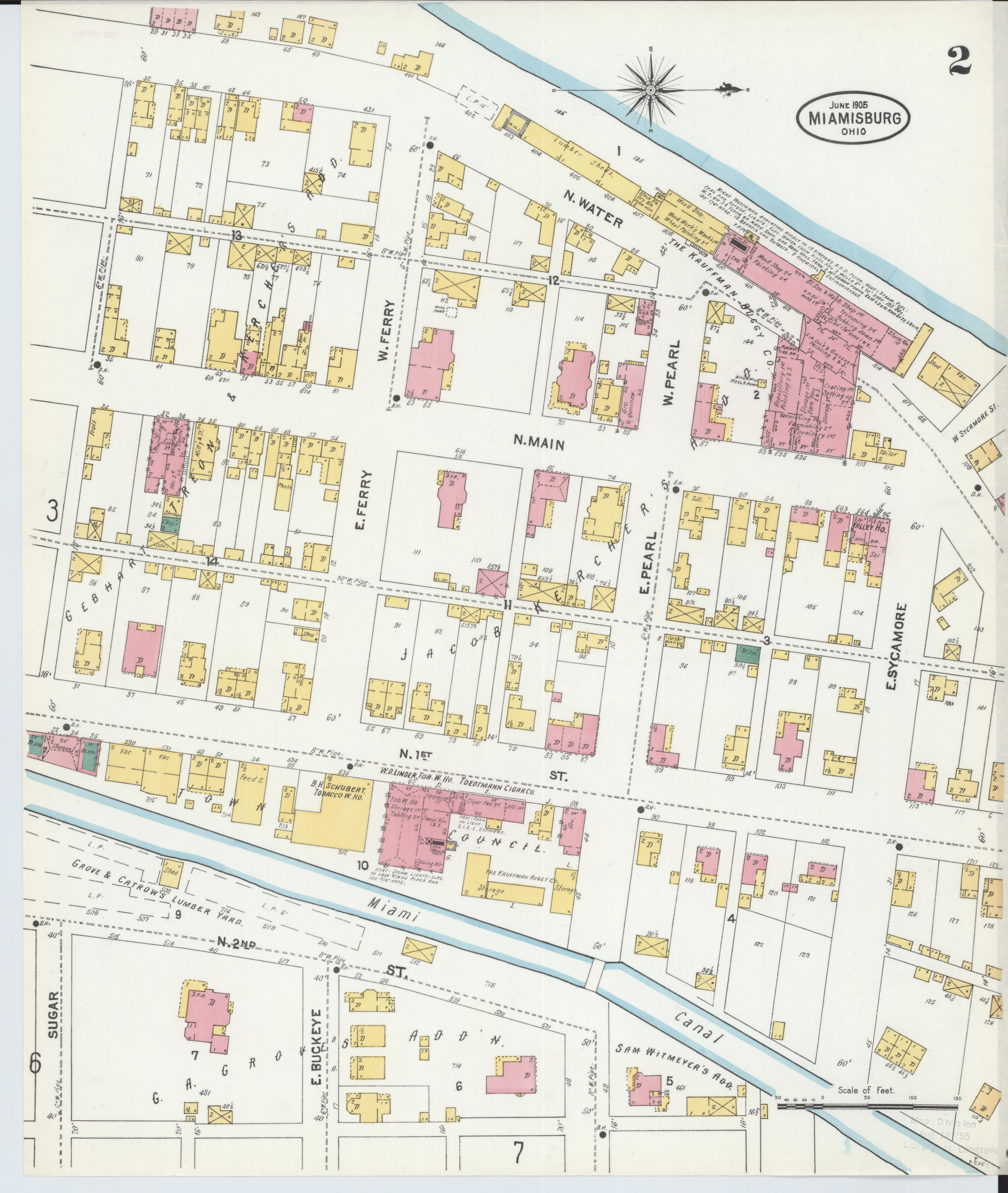
Hatfield: The production took place in collaboration with the Kauffman Motor Car Company

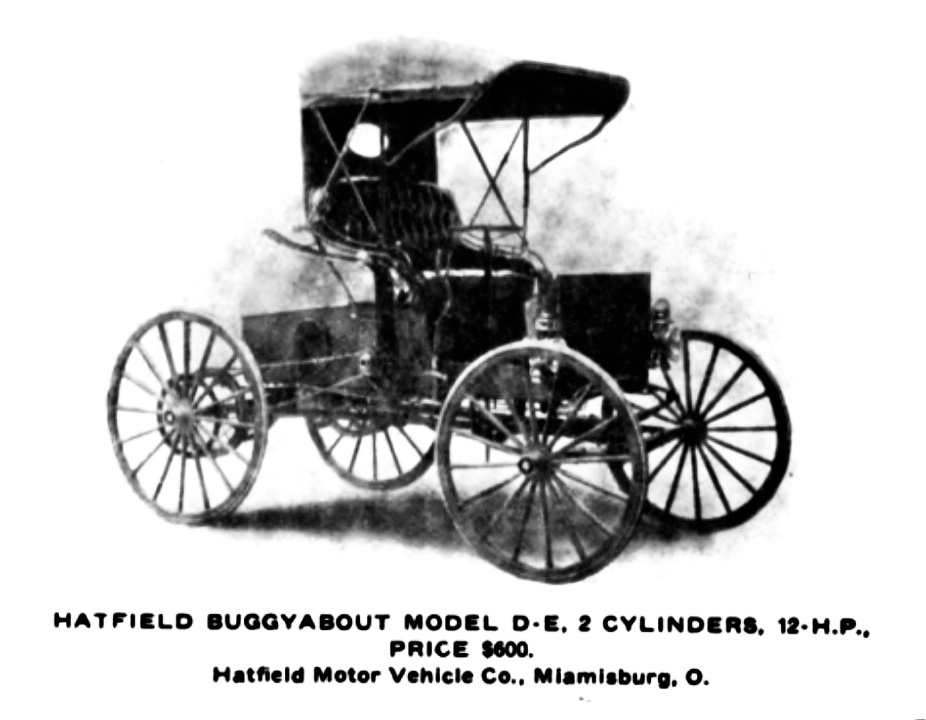
Hatfield Model D Model E Buggyabout (1907)

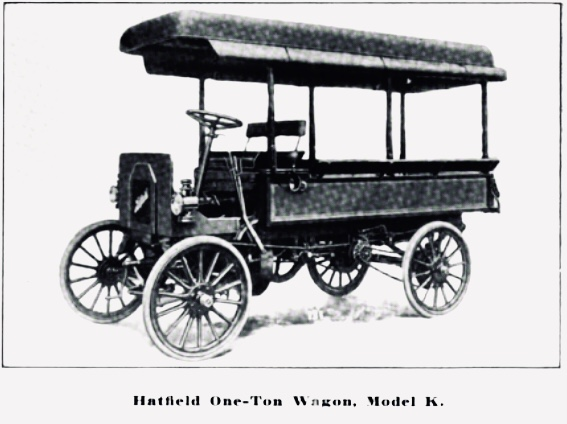
Hatfield Model K (1913) 1 t

Hatfield Motor Vehicle Company was a pioneer brass era American automobile company, built in Miamisburg, Ohio, in 1907 and 1908.

== History ==
The company was incorporated in 1906 by Charles B. Hatfield, Sr. in Cortland, New York. Variously calling the car the "Buggyabout" and "Unique", it was a high wheeler with an air-cooled two-cylinder four-stroke engine, friction transmission, and chain drive. It offered solid rubber tires on large wheels (38 in {96.5 cm} front, 40 in {102 cm} back).

== Production ==
By early 1907, the company had moved to Miamisburg, Ohio, to begin production. For 1907, the four-place Model B had a 12 hp (8 kW) twin on a 74 in (1880 mm) wheelbase at $600, the Model C a 14 hp four and a 101 in (2565 mm) wheelbase at $750, while in 1908, the B grew to a 78 in (1981 mm) wheelbase at $650, seating just two. In comparison, the Yale tourer sold for $1000, $700 for the Ford Model S $700, the high-volume Oldsmobile Runabout $650, Western's Gale Model A was US$500, a Brush Runabout $485, the Black from $375, and the Success was $250. Hatfield bodies and chassis were provided by Kauffman Buggy Company, located across town.

In 1908 (Miamisburg)

- Model 800 lbs = 0.4 t

In 1911 (Cornwall N.Y)

- Model C Bus 10 persons
- Model B 1000 lbs = 0.5 t
- Model D 1000 lbs = 0.5 t

In 1912 (Cornwall N.Y)

- Model G 1000 lbs = 0.5 t
- Model H 2000 lbs = 0.9 t

In 1913 (Cornwall N.Y)

- Model K 2000 lbs = 1 t

=== Advance Motor Vehicle Company ===
As receivership loomed in spring 1908, Hatfield merged with Kauffman to form Advance Motor Vehicle Company in June, 1908. In 1911, Advance became the Kauffman Motor Car Company.

=== Hatfield Automobile Company ===
As early as November 10, 1909, the Hatfield Automobile Company was organized with a capital of $30,000. By January 15, 1910, the Hatfield Automobile Company had named officers: David H. McConnell as president, Arthur S. Hoyt as vice president, and Charles B. Hatfield as secretary.

By March 4, 1911, Charles Hatfield, Jr. came on as secretary. He would be in charge of the offices on Broadway Street, Elmira, New York.

=== Hatfield Auto Truck Company ===
In 1912, the Hatfields moved to Elmira to manufacture trucks in conjunction with David H. McConnell, G. C. Brown, Alexander D. Henderson, and G. W. Blanchard. The company was listed as: "Hatfield Auto Truck Company of Elmira, N.Y.; capital $1,500,000; incorporators D. H. McConnell, A. D. Henderson, and Arthur S. Hoyt".

On November 17, 1913, W. A. Rexford acquired a large interest in the Hatfield Auto Truck Company. On June 9, 1914, it was announced that the Hatfield Auto Truck Company would closed out. Rexford and his partners did not expect to continue the business permanently, when it was purchased from the Hatfield interests. Charles Hatfield, Jr., would later design the O-We-Go cyclecar.

== Bibliography ==
- Clymer, Floyd (1950). Treasury of Early American Automobiles, 1877–1925. Bonanza Books.
- Kimes, Beverly Rae (1989). The Standard Catalog of American Cars, 1805–1942. Krause Publications. ISBN 0-87341-111-0.

== See also ==
- List of automobile manufacturers
- List of defunct automobile manufacturers
