= Adolph Goetting =

German chemist and businessman

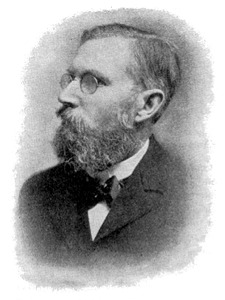
- Adolph Goetting, Perfumer.
- Born: May 28, 1851; Germany
- Died: October 1, 1929 (aged 78); Suffern, New York, U.S.
- Occupations: Perfumer, Chemist
- Known for: Goetting & Company

Adolph Goetting (May 28, 1851 – October 1, 1929) was a German chemist who founded the perfume company "Goetting & Co." The company was later purchased in 1896 by David H. McConnell, where it became part of the California Perfume Company, now called Avon Products.

== Career ==
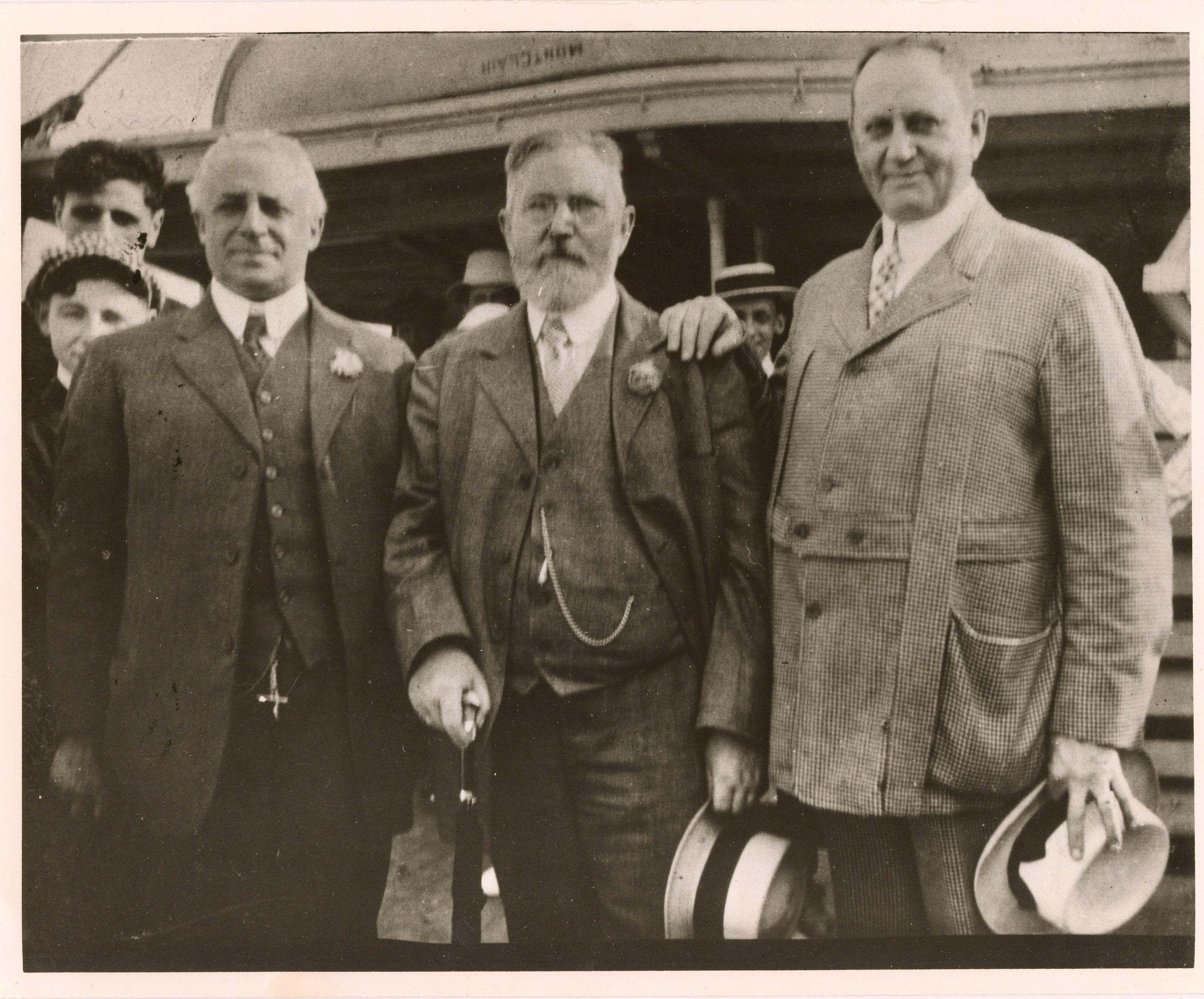
A. D. Henderson, Adolph Goetting, and D. H. McConnell, 1914

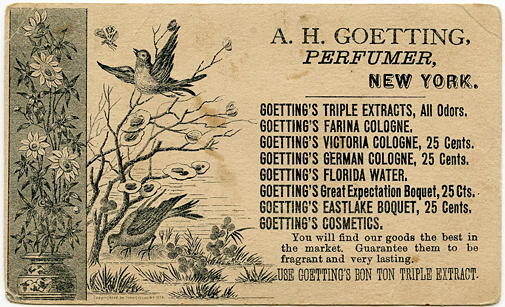
A. H. Goetting Trade Card, ca. 1880.

Adolph Goetting went into the perfumery business with his father in 1873 and later founded the A. Goetting & Company in 1871 at 264 Spring Street, New York. He was in business for 25 years, from 1871 until 1896. The Goetting name appeared on placards, calendars, trade cards, etc. On February 10, 1887, Goetting filed a patent application for a perfume Knapsack bottle with the United States Patent and Trademark Office. In his patent specification, Goetting described the bottle's design with a screw cap located in the center top of the sack with a chain handle.

In 1896, David H. McConnell asked perfumer Goetting to join the California Perfume Company as his chief chemist and to lead the existing McConnell product line. He used Goetting & Co., as a trade name that was associated with specific Goetting & Co. fragrances, e.g. Alpine Lilac, Carnation Pink, Jockey Club, etc. Goetting mixed the oils and alcohol to assemble the perfume. Perfumes were first manufactured, packaged and shipped from the office on 126 Chambers Street in New York City. In 1897 a laboratory was built in Suffern, New York. At the laboratory, Goetting began to make other items such as talcum powder, sachet powders, and toilet waters.

On March 1, 1898, Goetting & Co., of New York City, was incorporated with the state of Albany, New York. The capital was $25,00 and was managed by the directors: Adolph Goetting, E. C. Goetting and A. P. Mahn.

From 1903 through 1908, Goetting & Company was represented by A. D. Henderson and McConnell at the annual Perfumers' Association Conventions held in New York City.

McConnell ran the Goetting & Company perfume advertisements in some of the larger newspapers in the country. The July 3, 1907, Printers’ Ink Journal for Advertisers, ran a series of 10, 5-inch double column ads for Goetting & Company perfumes.

McConnell continued the manufacture and distribution of these products under the Goetting label through 1909. On June 16, 1909, McConnell and Henderson signed an agreement of incorporation for the California Perfume Company in the state of New Jersey. Goetting & Company then became part of the California Perfume Company.

In 1926, the factory in Suffern had 150 men and woman working in the laboratory. By this time Goetting had been in the business for over 50 years.

Goetting retired in 1926, and moved to Suffern, New York where he remained active. He took a great interest in Scouting and became a Scout Master of Troup 1.

== Death ==
On October 1, 1929, Goetting died at his home in Suffern, New York at age 78.

== See also ==
- History of perfume
- Perfumer
