= Frederico Perera =

English cricketer

Personal information
- Full name: Federico Perera
- Born: c. 1836; Holborn, Middlesex, England
- Died: 1909 (aged 72/73); England
- Batting: Unknown
- Role: Wicket-keeper
- Relatives: Pedro Perera (brother)

Career statistics
Competition	First-class
Matches	4
Runs scored	54
Batting average	7.71
100s/50s	–/–
Top score	29
Catches/stumpings	1/–
- Source: Cricinfo, 30 September 2019

Federico Perera (sometimes erroneously written as Frederick Perera) (c. 1836 – 1909) was an English first-class cricketer.

The son of the Spaniard Augurio Perera and his wife, Francisca, he was born at Holborn in about 1836. His father was a merchant who moved the family to Birmingham in the same year of his birth, where he took over a storehouse on Great Charles Street. In 1839, the family once more relocated, this time to Manchester. Perera made his debut in first-class cricket for Manchester against Surrey at Eccles in 1857. The following season, he made three appearances in first-class cricket, appearing twice for the Gentlemen of the North against the Gentlemen of the South, and once for Manchester against Sussex. He scored a total of 54 runs in his four first-class matches, at an average of 7.71 and a high score of 29. By profession, he too was a merchant. He died in 1909. His middle brother, Pedro, was also a first-class cricketer, while his eldest brother, Augurio, is credited as being the co-inventor of lawn tennis.
