= Pedro Perera =

English cricketer

Personal information
- Full name: Pedro Ricardo Perera
- Born: c. 1832; Holborn, Middlesex, England
- Died: 1915 (aged 82/83); Fulham, London, England
- Batting: Unknown
- Role: Wicket-keeper
- Relatives: Frederico Perera (brother)

Career statistics
Competition	First-class
Matches	2
Runs scored	125
Batting average	62.50
100s/50s	–/2
Top score	64*
Catches/stumpings	1/1
- Source: Cricinfo, 30 September 2019

Pedro Ricardo Perera (c. 1832 – 1915) was an English first-class cricketer.

The son of the Spaniard Augurio Perera and his wife, Francisca, he was born at Holborn in about 1832. His father was a merchant who moved the family to Birmingham in 1836, where he took over a storehouse on Great Charles Street. In 1839, the family once more relocated, this time to Manchester. Perera later made two appearances in first-class cricket in 1860 for the Gentlemen of the North against the Gentlemen of the South, playing at The Oval in the July fixture and at Salford in the return fixture in August. He scored a total of 125 runs in his two first-class matches, making a half century in each match, with a high score of 64 not out in the August fixture. By profession, he too was a merchant. Perera died at Fulham in 1915. His younger brother, Frederico, was also a first-class cricketer, while his eldest brother, Augurio, is credited as being the co-inventor of lawn tennis.
