= Kauffman Motor Vehicle Company =

Defunct American motor vehicle manufacturer

Overview
- Manufacturer: Kauffman Motor Vehicle Company
- Production: 1906–12

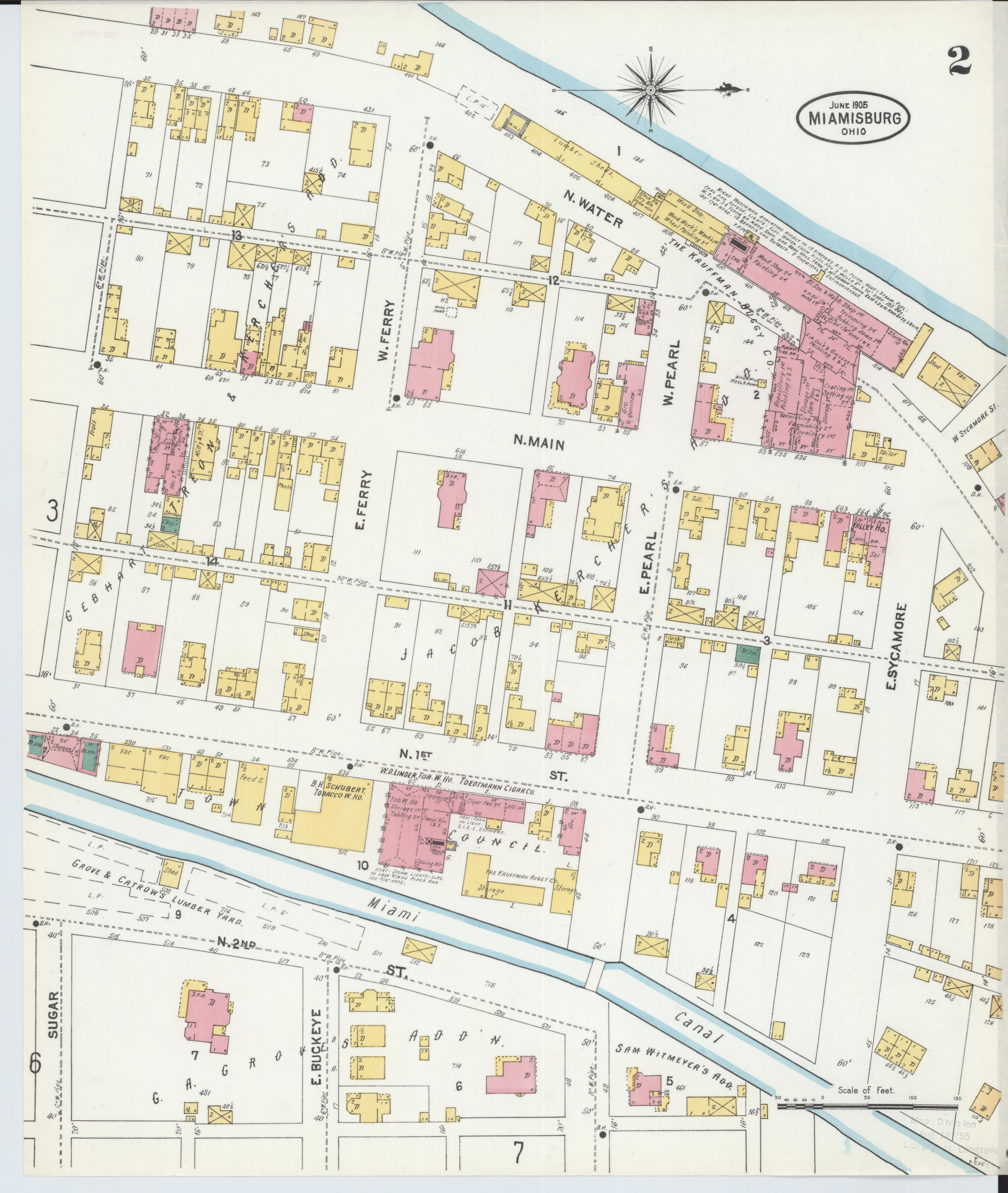
Kauffman Motor Vehicle Company plant (1905)

Kauffman Motor Vehicle Company was a pioneer brass era, American automobile company, built in Miamisburg, Ohio, from 1909 until 1912.

== History ==
The company was begun in 1906 as the Kauffman Buggy Company, providing bodies and chassis for Hatfield, located across town. In 1908, as Hatfield ran into financial difficulties, the two firms merged, to form the Advance Motor Vehicle Company.

Under the Advance name, they introduced a four-passenger roadster with a refined version of Hartfield's four-cylinder on a 104 in (2642 mm) wheelbase. The Model C sold for US$1000,

Advance became the Kauffman Motor Car Company in 1911, and folded the next year.

== Sources ==
- Clymer, Floyd. Treasury of Early American Automobiles, 1877–1925. New York: Bonanza Books, 1950.
- Kimes, Beverly Rae. The Standard Catalog of American Cars, 1805–1942. Iola, Wisconsin: Krause Publications, 1989. ISBN 0-87341-111-0.
- Burgess-Wise, David (2000). The New Illustrated Encyclopedia of Automobiles. BookSales Inc; Rev Upd edition (May 2000). p. 559. ISBN 0-7858-1106-0.

== See also ==
- List of automobile manufacturers
- List of defunct automobile manufacturers
