= Harry Gem =

English lawyer, soldier, writer and sportsman

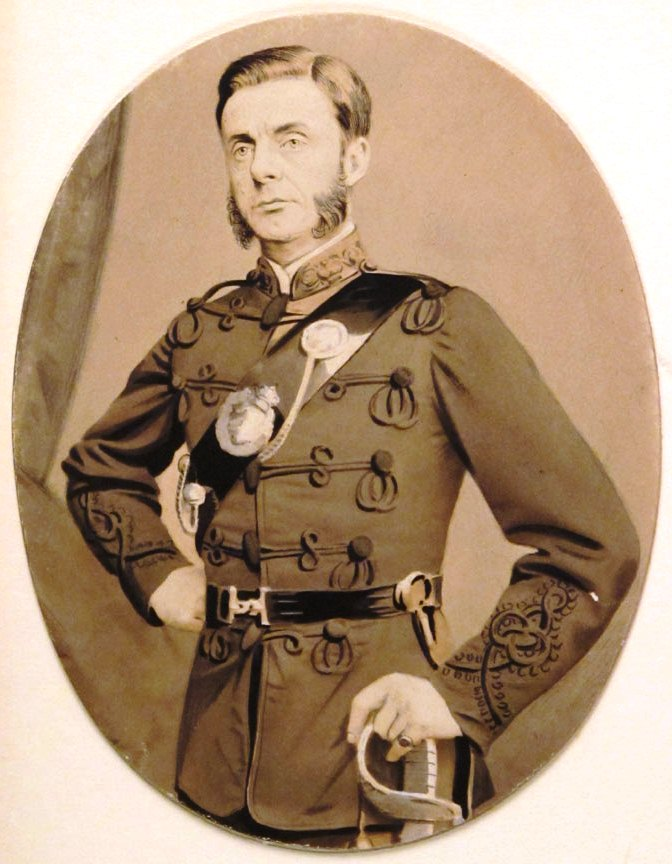
- Captain Harry Gem in his Birmingham Rifle Volunteer Corps uniform in 1868
- Born: 21 May 1819; Birmingham, England
- Died: 4 November 1881 (aged 62); Birmingham, England
- Education: King's College, London

Major Thomas Henry Gem (21 May 1819 – 4 November 1881), known as Harry Gem, was an English lawyer, soldier, writer and sportsman.

Alongside his friend Augurio Perera, he is credited as a lawn tennis pioneer.

== Biography ==
Gem was born in Birmingham, the son of William Gem, also a solicitor, and was educated at King's College London. From 1841 he practised as a solicitor in Birmingham, becoming a magistrate's clerk in 1856.

Highly active in local life, Gem wrote journalism and drama for several local publications, rose to the rank of Major in the 1st Warwickshire Rifle Volunteer Corps and was active in numerous sports including cricket and athletics. He is recorded as having won a bet by running the 21 miles from Birmingham to Warwick in under three and a half hours.

=== Lawn tennis ===
Among Gem's sporting interests was the game of rackets, which he played at the Bath Street Racquets Club adjacent to the Racquet Court Inn in Bath Street, Birmingham with his friend Augurio Perera, a Spanish merchant based in Birmingham. Frustrated at the complex and expensive facilities required for rackets, however, the two developed a similar game that could be played outdoors and may have been played on Perera's croquet lawn at 8 Ampton Road in Edgbaston, incorporating elements of rackets alongside features of the Basque game of pelota.

This game is known to have been being played by 1865, though research has suggested that experimentation may have started as early as 1859. It thus clearly pre-dates the game of sphairistikè, whose rules were published and for which equipment was sold by Major Walter Clopton Wingfield from March 1874.

Gem and Perera's game also bore a closer resemblance to modern tennis than Wingfield's in several significant respects, most notably in being played on a similarly sized and configured rectangular grass court, rather than the hourglass-shaped court with a 'waist' at the net that featured in Wingfield's sphairistikè.

Gem and Perera’s game was originally known as Lawn rackets or pelota.

=== Early tennis clubs ===
Some time between 1873 and 1874 both Gem and Perera moved to Leamington Spa and in 1874 formed the Leamington Club with Frederic Haynes and Arthur Tomkins, two doctors from a local hospital, specifically to play the new game of lawn tennis. The Leamington Club, renamed to Leamington Lawn Tennis Club at the end of 1874, thus became the world's first tennis club, playing on the lawns of the Manor House Hotel opposite Perera's new home in Avenue Road.

Gem had also been a member of the Edgbaston Archery Society from 1864 to 1867 and, although there is no direct evidence to demonstrate that he personally introduced lawn tennis to the society, the game was certainly a fixture in the society's calendar by 1875, with the society being renamed the Edgbaston Archery and Lawn Tennis Society in 1877.

== Death ==
Gem died on 4 November 1881 as the result of an accident which occurred on 25 June that year, at the military camp in Sutton Park.

== See also ==
- Augurio Perera
- Walter Clopton Wingfield
- History of tennis
