= David H. McConnell =

American businessman

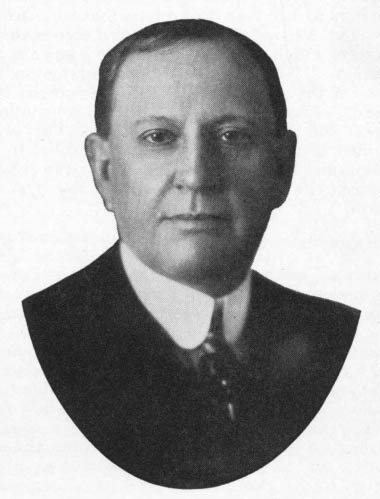
- McConnell in 1924
- Born: David Hall McConnell; July 18, 1858; Oswego, New York, U.S.
- Died: January 20, 1937 (aged 78); Suffern, New York, U.S.
- Education: Oswego State Normal School
- Occupations: salesman, entrepreneur, businessman
- Known for: Avon Products

David Hall McConnell Sr. (July 18, 1858 – January 20, 1937) was an American businessman who was the founder and president of the "California Perfume Company", which then became Avon Products.

== Early life ==
David Hall McConnell was born in Oswego, New York, son of James and Isabel (Hall) McConnell, who came from County Cavan, Ireland, in 1845.

== Career ==
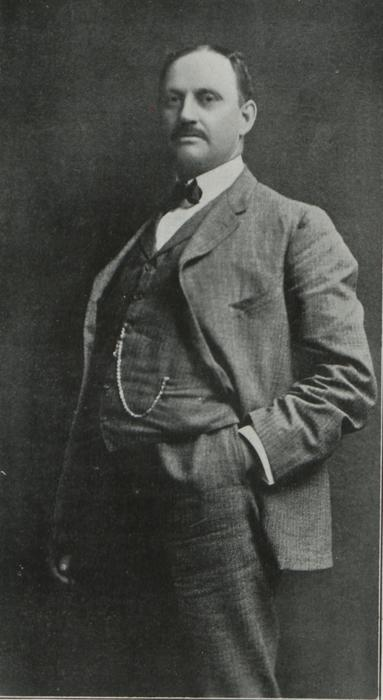
McConnell in 1905

On June 16, 1909, McConnell and Alexander D. Henderson, signed an agreement of Corporation for the California Perfume Company in the state of New Jersey. On January 28, 1916, the California Perfume Company was incorporated in the state of New York. McConnell, Henderson, and William Scheele were listed as company officials. The name, California Perfume Company, was a suggestion made by a friend of McConnell's who had written to him describing California because of the great abundance of flowers in California.

Through subsequent changes in name it became Allied Products, Inc., and incorporated in 1924, being an outgrowth of the California Perfume Company of Canada, Ltd., which was started in 1906; Hinze Ambrosia, Inc., and Technical Laboratories, Inc.

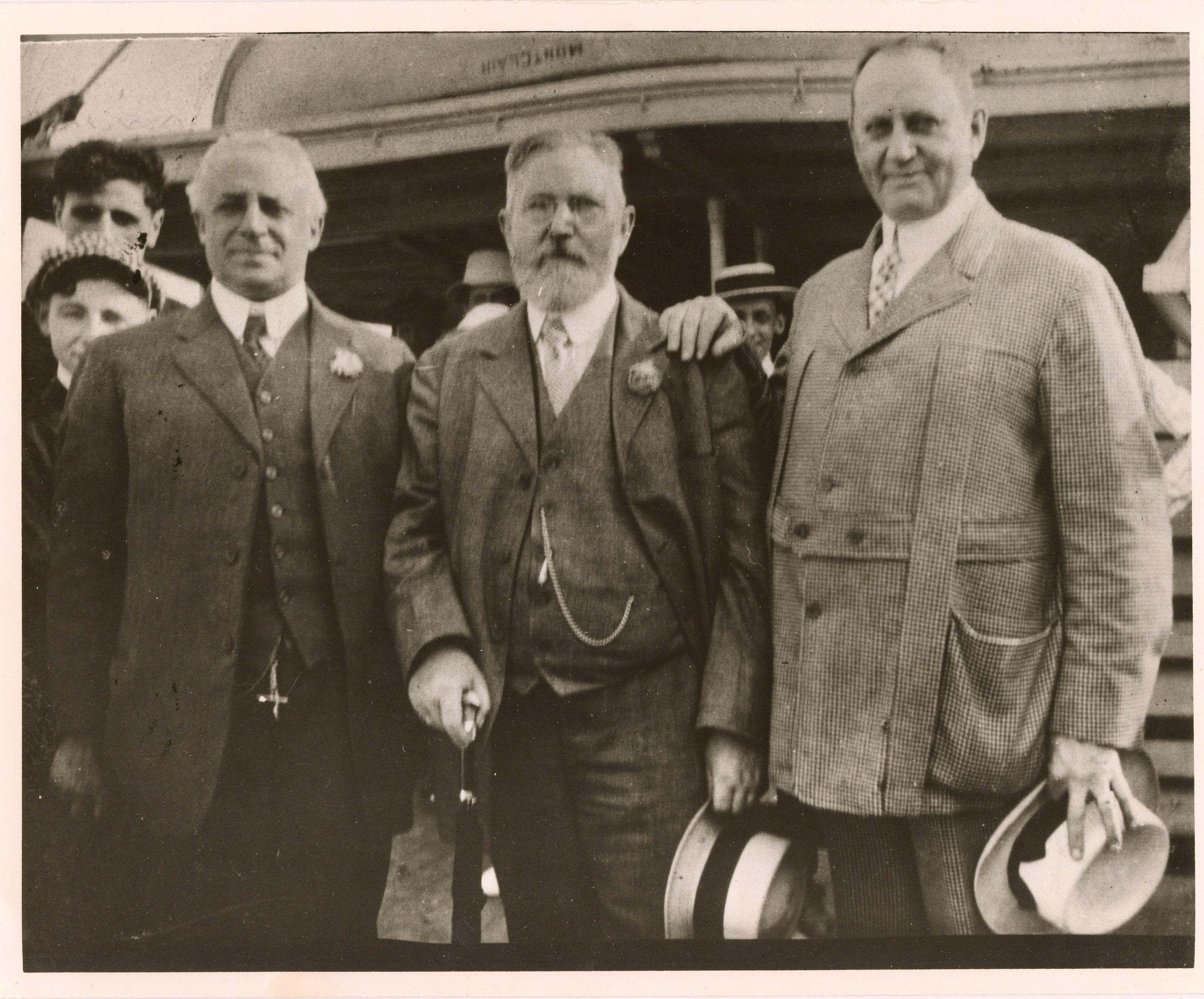
A. D. Henderson, Adolph Goetting, and D. H. McConnell, 1914

McConnell was president, chairman of the board and principal owner of Avon Allied Products, Inc., and its affiliated companies until his death. He was also treasurer of G.W. Carnrick & Co., manufacturers of pharmaceutical supplies in Newark, NJ, and a director of the Holly Hill Fruit Products, Inc., a large orange grove and canning enterprise of Davenport, FL. He was one of the founders of the Suffern National Bank of which he became vice president in 1901, president in 1922 and chairman of the board in 1927. He was again elected chairman of the board and president in 1933 and continued in one or the other office until his death.

=== Personal life ===
For varying periods he was superintendent of schools in Suffern; president of the Suffern Board of Education, and treasurer of the Rockland County Republican committee.

=== Marriage and children ===
McConnell was married in Chicago on March 31, 1885, to Lucy Emma Hayes, daughter of Ward Hays of La Porte, Indiana. They had three children.

== Death ==
On January 20, 1937, McConnell died at his family home in Suffern, New York at age 78. His son, David McConnell, Jr. became the new President. He is buried at the Airmont Lutheran Cemetery in Suffern, Rockland County, New York.
