= Augurio Perera =

Spanish-born merchant, c.1822-1905

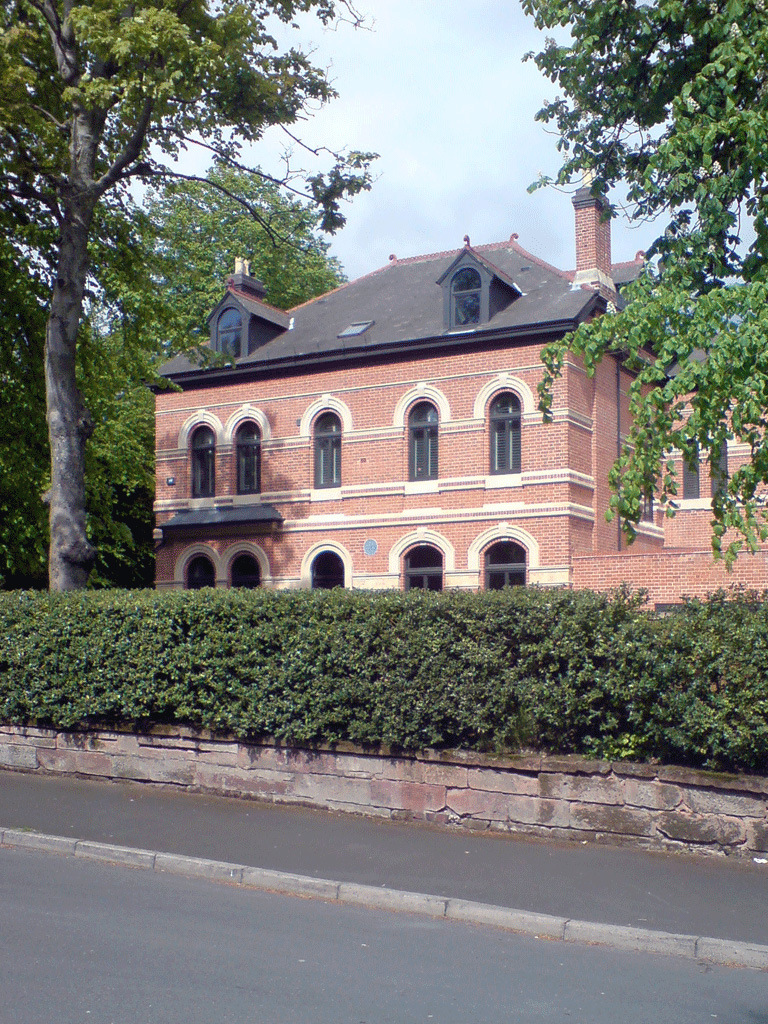
Perera's house in Edgbaston, Birmingham, where he and Harry Gem invented the modern game of lawn tennis

Juan Bautista Luis Augurio Perera Orfila (in Spanish; Joan Baptista Auguri Perera in Catalan, c. 1822–1905), known as Augurio Perera, was a Spanish merchant and sportsman based in England, credited alongside his friend Harry Gem as a lawn tennis pioneer.

== Life ==
Perera was born in Manresa, Catalonia, Spain in around 1822. He moved to England with his parents Augurio and Francisca at the age of four, and the family lived in London for ten years, before moving to Birmingham in 1836. After the rest of the family relocated to Manchester in 1839, Perera remained in the Midlands, becoming naturalised in 1856, settling in the Edgbaston area of Birmingham and establishing a successful business importing Spanish merchandise. His younger brothers, Pedro and Frederico, both played first-class cricket.

A keen rackets player, he was a member of the Bath Street Racquets Club with Gem. The club was adjacent to the Racquet Court Inn in Bath Street, Birmingham, about two miles from his home, Fairlight at 8 Ampton Road, Edgbaston. It was on the croquet lawn of this house that Perera and Gem were to develop a game that combined elements of both the game of rackets and Basque pelota between 1859 and 1865, naming it Lawn rackets, Lawn pelota or, eventually, Lawn tennis.

In 1873, Perera and Gem moved to Royal Leamington Spa and established a club to play their game on the lawns of the Manor House Hotel, opposite Perera's new home in Avenue Road. Perera left Leamington for Paris in December 1883. His life after this date was until recently unknown. However, new research has revealed that he relocated to Italy, where he died in Siena on 1 November 1905 and was buried two days later at the city's main cemetery.

== Tennis ==
The invention of tennis is traditionally ascribed to Walter Clopton Wingfield, who published rules for a game he called sphairistikè in 1874. It is Wingfield's statue that stands at the headquarters of the Lawn Tennis Association. However, in his meticulously-researched work, Tennis: A Cultural History, Heiner Gillmeister reveals that on 8 December 1874, Wingfield had written to Harry Gem, commenting that he'd been experimenting with his version of lawn tennis for only a year and a half.

It is now no longer in dispute (despite the traditional credit given to Wingfield) that Gem and Perera, who had established an organized lawn tennis club in Leamington Spa 1874, had been playing their invention for a decade or more. In addition, much less is known about Perera than his friend and fellow tennis pioneer Harry Gem, whose life is well documented as a prominent figure in several walks of Birmingham society. In a letter to The Field in November 1874, however, Gem largely credited Perera with the development of the game.

== See also ==
- History of tennis
- Palazzo della Pilotta
- Valencian pilota
- Augurius of Tarragona
- Follis (ball)
