= Northeast Classic Car Museum =

Coordinates: 42.53654°N 75.52173°W

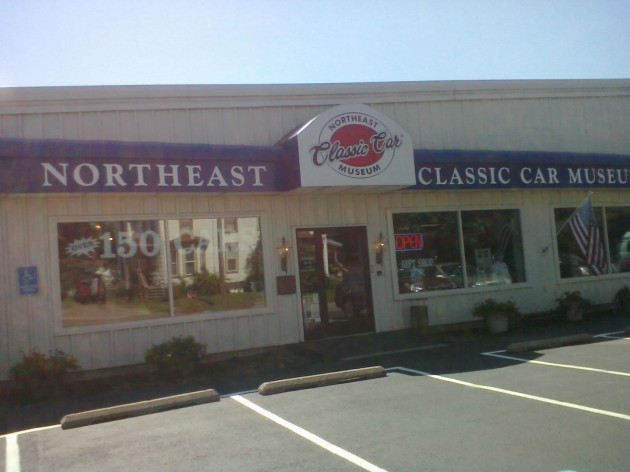
Entrance to the museum

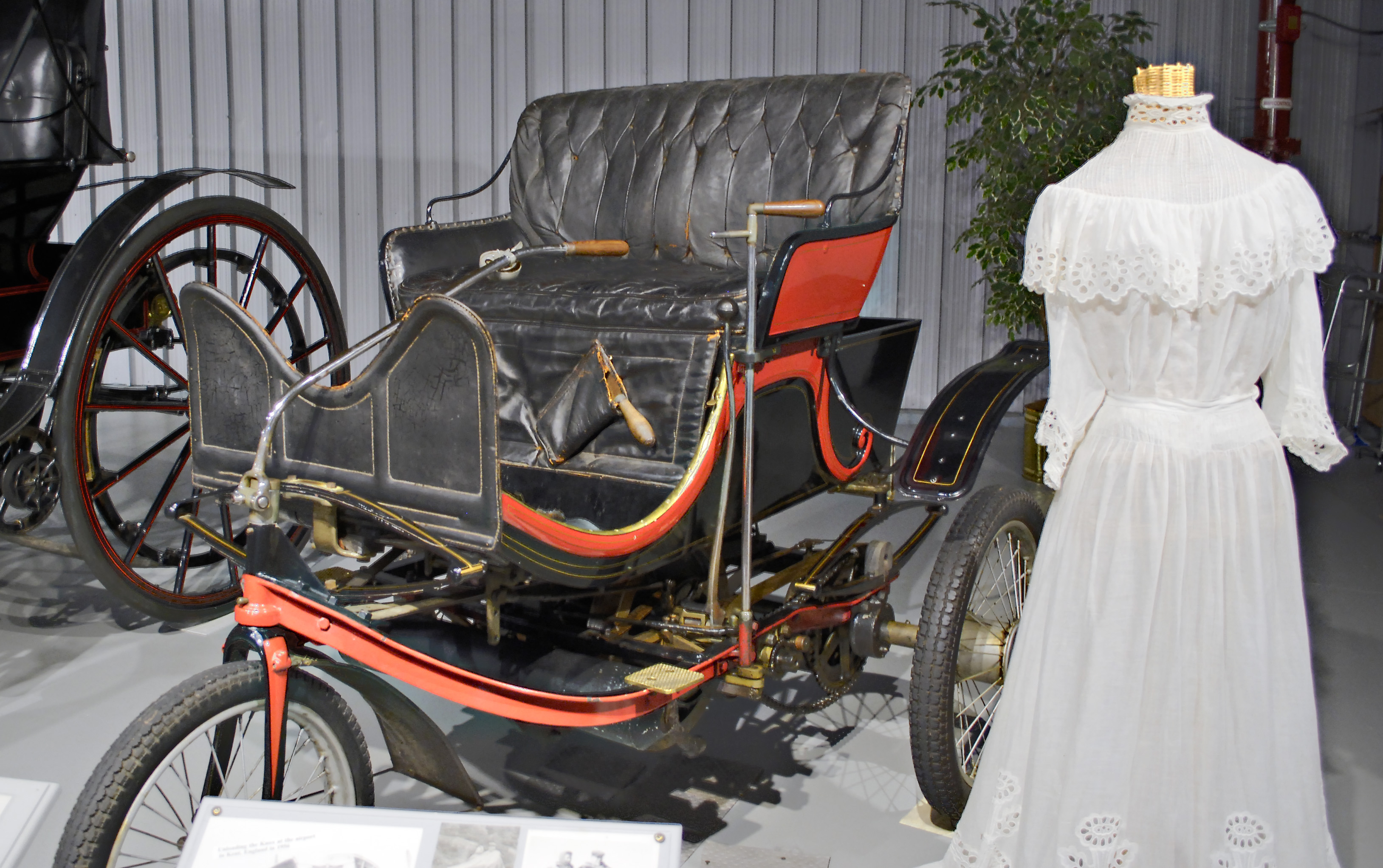
Displays at the museum

The Northeast Classic Car Museum is a non-profit educational facility in Norwich, New York that collects and exhibits notable vehicles throughout the history of the United States. The museum opened on Memorial Day, 1997.

The museum was founded to encourage tourism in Chenango County, New York. The majority of the museum's collection is from the private collection of George Staley of Lincklaen, New York, who retired from the United States Air Force. The most notable cars that Staley maintained were produced by Franklin, which generated interest from the museum planners. Staley was running out of room for his vehicles when he was approached by the planners.

Over 160 vehicles from 1899 through the early 1970s are on display in five connected buildings. Permanent exhibits feature Franklin automobiles, luxury vehicles, post-war vehicles, and cars made in New York State. Other exhibits are featured on a changing basis.
