= Walter Clopton Wingfield =

Inventor of modern tennis

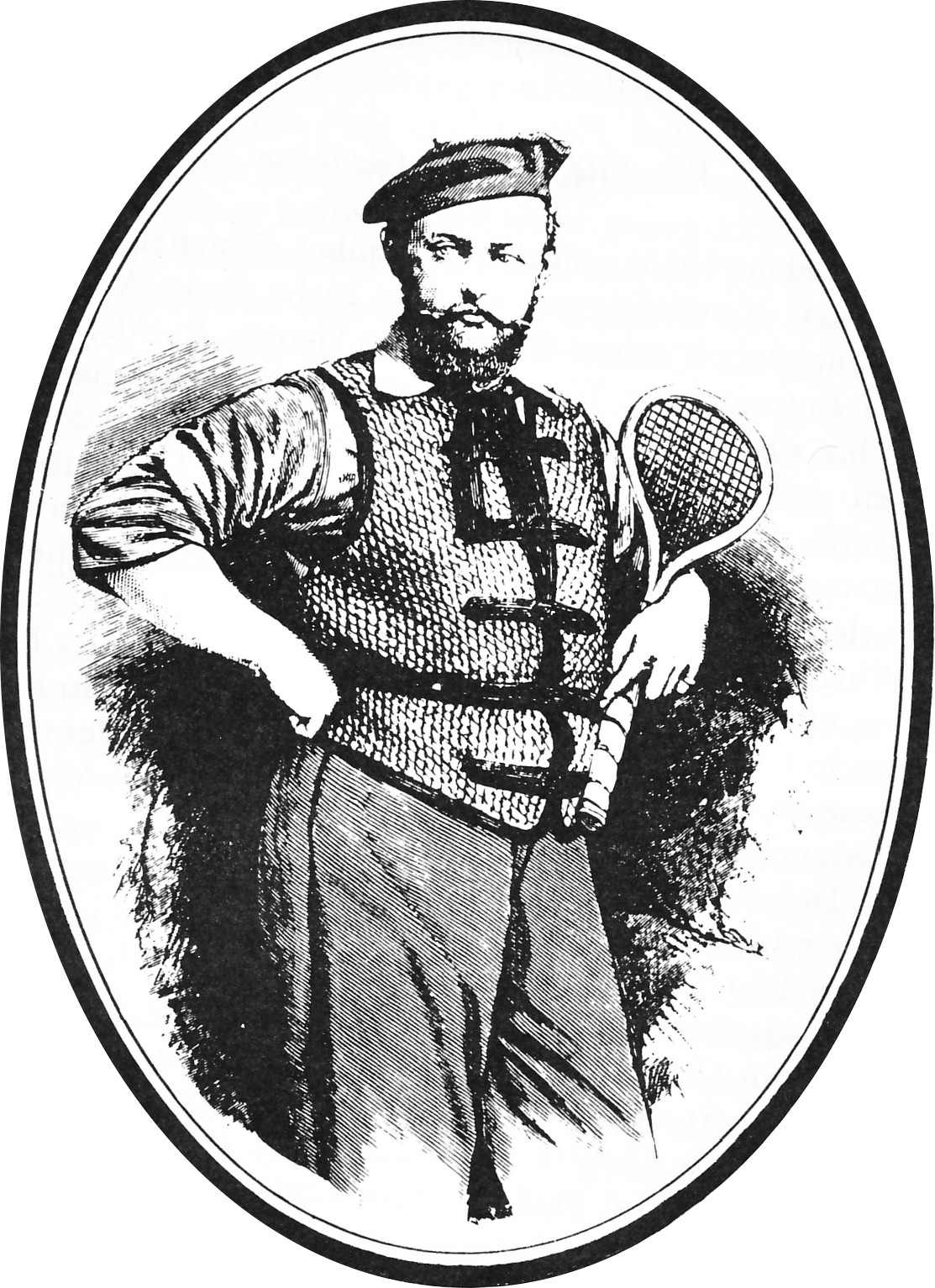
- Wingfield from Illustrated Sporting and Dramatic News 1881
- Born: Walter Clopton Wingfield; 16 October 1833; Ruabon, Wales
- Died: 18 April 1912 (aged 78); London, England
- Burial place: Kensal Green Cemetery

Major Walter Clopton Wingfield MVO (16 October 1833 – 18 April 1912) was a Welsh inventor and a British Army officer who was one of the pioneers of lawn tennis. Inducted into the International Tennis Hall of Fame in 1997 as the founder of modern lawn tennis, an example of the original equipment for the sport and a bust of Wingfield can be seen at the Wimbledon Lawn Tennis Museum.

== Family and early life ==
Wingfield was born on 16 October 1833 in Ruabon, Denbighshire, Wales, the son of Clopton Lewis Wingfield, major in the 66th Foot Regiment, and Jane Eliza, daughter of Sir John Mitchell KCB. He grew up at Preston Montford in Shropshire, where his parents moved. His mother died in 1836 after the birth of her second child and his father died in 1846 of a bowel obstruction. Walter was subsequently brought up by his uncle and great uncle. He was educated at Rossall School, and in 1851 entered the Royal Military College, Sandhurst, on the second attempt through the influence of his great uncle who was a colonel. He was commissioned a Cornet in the 1st Dragoon Guards and served in India. In 1858 Wingfield became a captain and in 1860 he took part in the campaign in China and was present at the capture of Peking. He returned to England in 1861 and retired from the Dragoon Guards a year later.

During the decade he was based at his family estate, Rhysnant, Four Crosses, in Montgomeryshire, Wales, before moving into London in 1867. He was a Justice of the Peace (JP) for the county and served in the Montgomeryshire Yeomanry, joining as Lieutenant in 1864, appointed adjutant of the regiment in 1868, and promoted Major in 1874.

In 1870 he was appointed to the Honourable Corps of Gentlemen at Arms, giving him some employment at the courts of Queen Victoria and her son Edward VII. He was invested by King Edward VII as a Member (fourth class) of the Royal Victorian Order (MVO) on 11 August 1902. He retired from the Corps in 1909.

== Lawn tennis ==
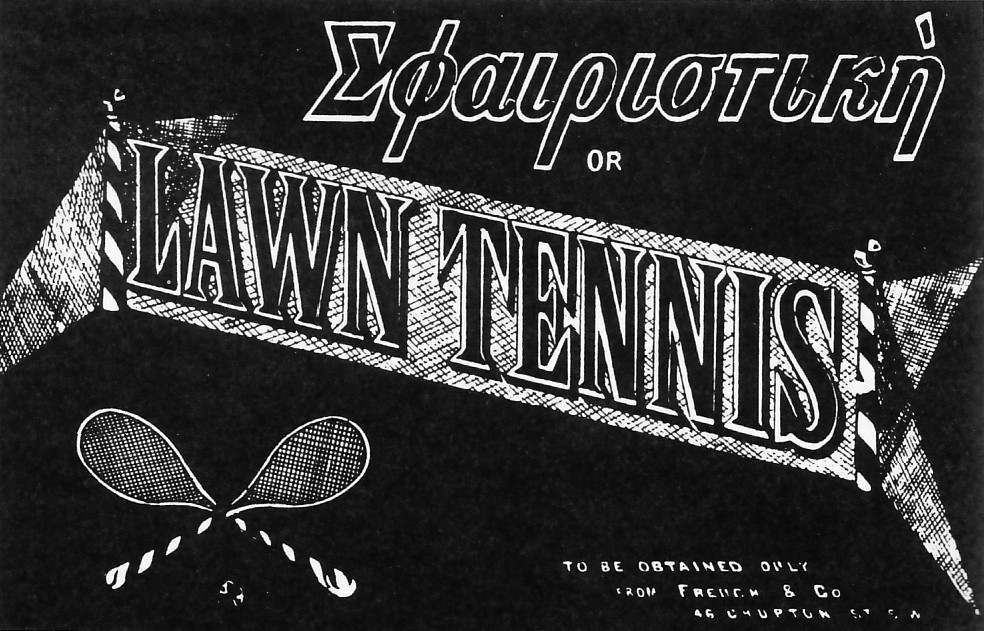
Cover of the first edition of the book about Lawn Tennis by Walter Clopton Wingfield, published in February 1874.

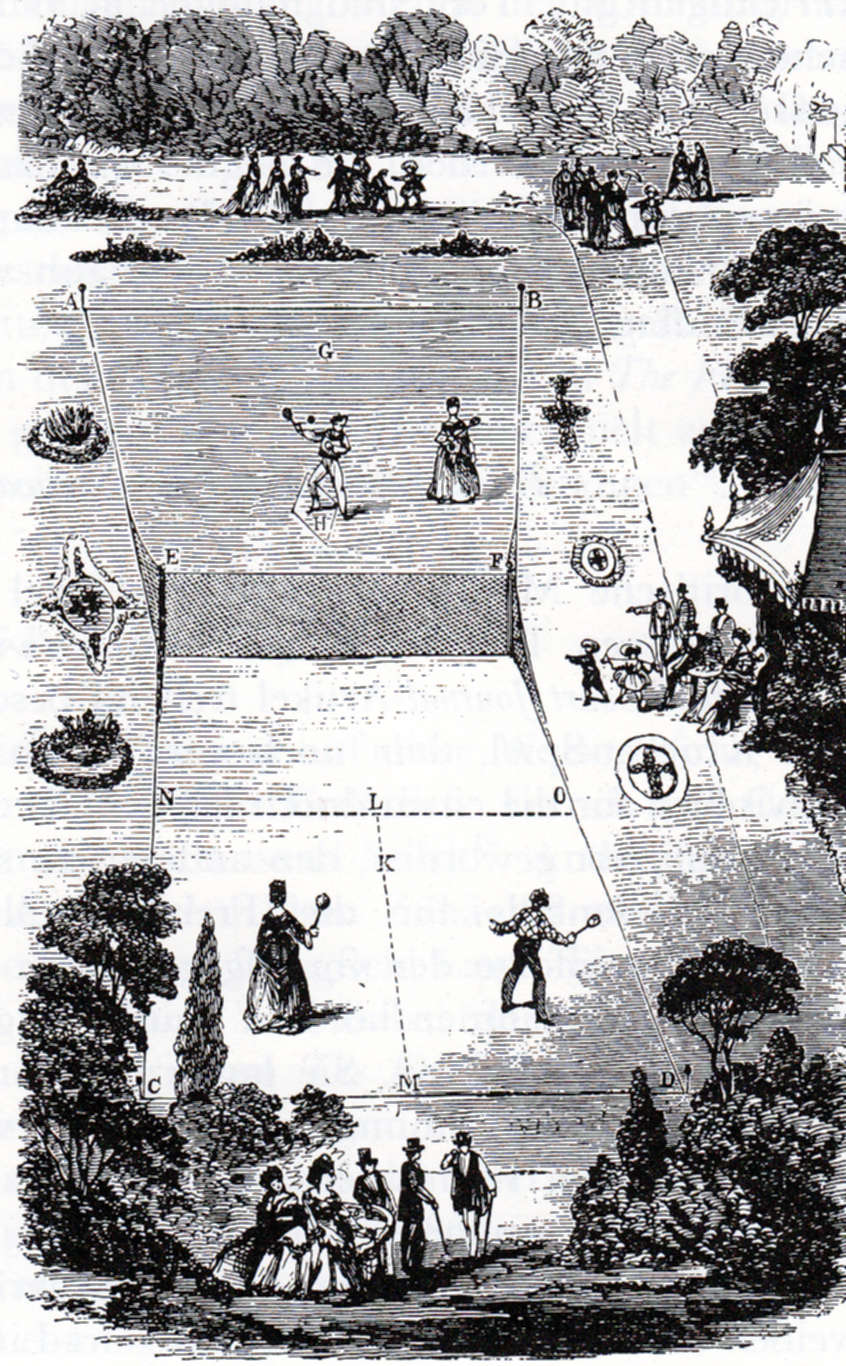
Lawn Tennis Court as designed by W. C. W.

In the late 1860s Wingfield was one of the persons experimenting with a lawn version of tennis. Vulcanised bouncing rubber balls offered an opportunity to develop from the indoor game of real tennis and there were many who had the leisure time to pursue the sport and who owned croquet lawns that could be adapted for it. The precise date that Wingfield brought it to the public is uncertain. Major Wingfield was primarily inspired by the rules of Badminton played by British and Indian athletes in British India for recreation, while he was stationed there. He then applied the court shape and other net specifications in making the rules of lawn tennis. Lord Lansdowne claimed that in 1869 Major Wingfield gave a demonstration of the game to him in the garden of his Berkeley Square house, although in that year Wingfield was not a major. Another attribution was to a party held at Nantclwyd Hall in Denbighshire, Wales, although that party actually took place in December. Nor was Wingfield the only exponent. At the same time, and in fact a little earlier, Harry Gem and Augurio Perera were demonstrating their game of Pelota in Leamington Spa, 20 miles outside of Birmingham.

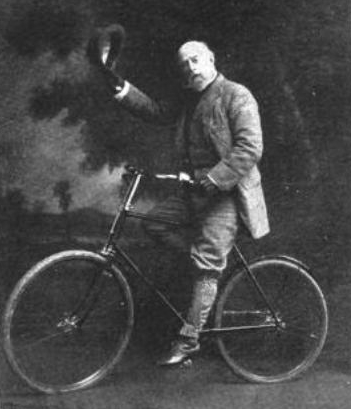
In The Sketch, 9 June 1897

Wingfield however became notable for introducing the game in London when he patented a New and Improved Court for Playing the Ancient Game of Tennis and began marketing his game in the spring of 1874 selling boxed sets that included rubber balls imported from Germany as well as a net, poles, court markers, rackets and an instruction manual. The sets were available from Wingfield's agent, French and Co. in Pimlico in London, and cost between five and ten guineas. In his version the game was played on an hour-glass shaped court and the net was higher (4 feet 8 inches). The service had to be made from a diamond-shaped box at one end only and the service had to bounce beyond the service line instead of in front of it. He adopted the Rackets-based system of scoring where games consisted of 15 points (called "aces"). In order to differentiate his game, he named it Sphairistikè (which was poor Greek using a feminine adjective meaning "pertaining to a ball game" without an appropriate noun.) Between July 1874 and June 1875 1,050 tennis sets were sold, mainly to the aristocracy.

Tennis was becoming an important adjunct to cricket at the Marylebone Cricket Club (MCC); Real tennis was (and still is) played at Lord's Cricket Ground; lawn tennis was also briefly established at Lord's in the mid-1870s. In 1875 John Moyer Heathcote instigated a meeting at the MCC to establish a universal set of rules and Wingfield was invited to participate. Wingfield's hourglass court and scoring method were adopted and Wingfield considered his sport was now entrusted to the MCC. During this time he suffered personal tragedies including the developing mental illness of his wife and the death of his three young sons and he lost all interest in the game. In 1877 the All England Lawn Tennis and Croquet Club (AELTC) launched the Wimbledon Championship and prior to this, in cooperation with the MCC representatives, developed a new set of rules that excluded some of Wingfield's introductions. Wingfield authored two tennis works: The Book of the Game (1873) and The Major's Game of Lawn Tennis (1874).

== Later life ==
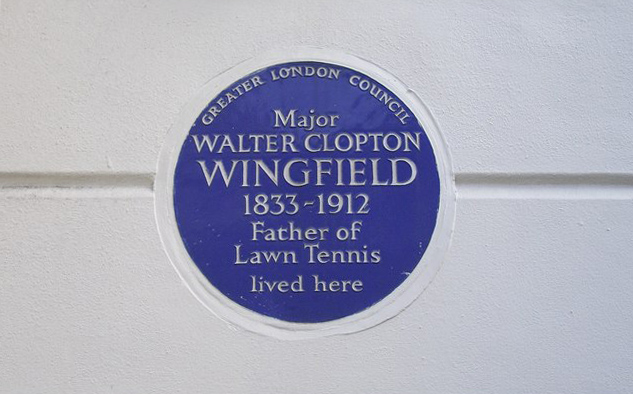
Blue plaque with the inscription; 'Major Walter Clopton Wingfield' (1833-1912) Father of lawn tennis lived here, 33 St George's Square, Pimlico, London

Wingfield became vice-president of "The Universal Cookery and Food Association". In around 1890 he founded a culinary society called "Le Cordon Rouge" which was intended to further the development of the science of cookery. At the same time, he was active again as an inventor and experimented with bicycles. He created a new type of bicycle which he called "The Butterfly" and developed a form of bicycling riding in unison by several riders to the tunes of martial music.

On 22 November 1902 Edward VII made Wingfield a member (fourth class) of the Royal Victorian Order (MVO) for "extraordinary, important and personal services to the Sovereign and the Royal family." and for 32 years of faithful service.

Wingfield lived at 112 Belgrave Road, Pimlico, London for a time and died at 33 St Georges Square, London (a Blue plaque commemorates this) at the age of 78 and was buried in Kensal Green Cemetery. He was inducted into the International Tennis Hall of Fame in 1997 for his contribution to tennis. The Wingfield Restaurant at the All England Club is named in his honour.

== Family ==
Wingfield married Alice Lydia Cleveland, daughter of a general, in Bangalore. Madras India in 1858. They had three sons, Watkin Harold (1859-1876), Rowland Pehrhyn (1861-1882), and Walter Clopton (Tig) (1871-1886). All three died tragically young. Alice survived him by many years and died in the Wandsworth asylum in November 1934, aged 92, and buried in Kensal Green Cemetery.
