= Avon Products =

Anglo-American beauty products company

Avon Products, Inc.
- Avon International logo since 2023
- Trade name: Avon
- Type: Subsidiary
- Industry: Cosmetics
- Founded: 1886; 140 years ago
- Founder: David H. McConnell
- Headquarters: London, United Kingdom
- Area served: Worldwide
- Key people: Kristof Neirynck (CEO); James S. Scully (COO and CFO); Sara Davies MBE (Chief Inspiration Officer)
- Products: Cosmetics; Perfume; Skin Care; Personal Care
- Revenue: ▲US$9.1 billion (2020)
- Operating income: ▼US$235.2 million (2018)
- Net income: ▲US$−107.4 million (2016)
- Total assets: ▼US$3.01 billion (2018)
- Total equity: ▲US$−848 million (2016)
- Number of employees: 23,000 (2019)
- Parent: Regent LP
- Website: avonworldwide.com

Avon Products, Inc., doing business as Avon (/ˈeɪvɒn/ AY-von), is an Anglo-American multinational company selling cosmetics, skin care, perfume, and personal care products. It is a multi-level marketing company based in London. In 2020, Avon had annual sales of $9.1 billion worldwide.

== History ==
Avon Products founder, David H. McConnell, initially sold books as a door-to-door salesman to New York homes. In September 1886, he decided to sell perfumes rather than books. He started the new business in a small office at 126 Chambers Street, Manhattan, New York. McConnell changed the company name in 1892. His business partner suggested calling it the "California Perfume Company." His business partner was living in California at the time and suggested the name because of the abundance of flowers in California.

Early emblems

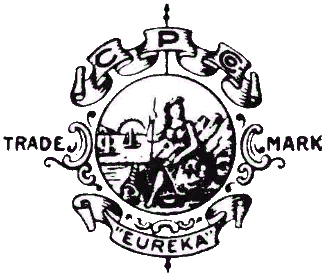
First logo of the company (1886)

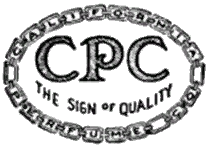
"California Perfume Company" logo (1911)

In May 1894, Alexander D. Henderson joined the company, became vice-president and treasurer, and helped shape its policies and assist in its growth. In 1897 they built a laboratory in Suffern, New York. On May 3, 1909, the California Perfume Company corporate office moved to 31 Park Place, New York. On June 16, 1909, McConnell and Henderson signed an agreement of Incorporation for the California Perfume Company in the state of New Jersey. In 1914, California Perfume Company started selling in Montreal. On January 28, 1916, the California Perfume Company was incorporated in the state of New York. McConnell, Henderson, and William Scheele were listed as company officials. In 1928, the company began to selling Avon products. In 1939, the California Perfume Company changed its name to Avon Products, Inc.

In March 1973, Avon Products was selling on Wall Street for $140, by August 1974 it had dropped to $25.

=== Mergers and acquisitions ===
The Story of Perfumery and the CPC by William Scheele, published in 1924, tells the history of Avon.

Avon Products purchased Silpada, a direct seller of silver jewelry, in 2010 for $650 million. In May 2012, perfume company Coty offered $24.75 a share for Avon, which was nearly 20 percent above Avon's stock price at the time. While Fox Business Network reported that Avon delayed the process and Coty withdrew its offer, earlier reports said that Avon rejected the bid, stating "At the time, the board concluded, and it still believes, that Coty's indication of interest is opportunistic and not in the best interest of Avon's shareholders."

In March 2016, Cerberus Capital Management paid $435 million in cash for preferred stock in Avon Products. This move was the conclusion of a deal initiated in December 2015, when Avon sold 80.1 percent of its North American Business to Cerberus for $170 million. The total value of the deal was $605 million. The investment resulted in Cerberus having an almost 17 percent stake in Avon Products.

In January 2020, Natura & Co closed the acquisition of Avon Products, Inc. At the time, The Natura & Co group also included Natura, Aesop, and The Body Shop, and with the acquisition of Avon had created the world's fourth-largest pure-play beauty company.

=== Recent history ===
Jan Zijderveld was appointed the company's CEO in February 2018. The former CEO, Sherilyn S. McCoy, stayed on as an adviser to the Board and to Zijderveld through March 31, 2018.

In January 2021, New Avon Company announced its corporate name change to The Avon Company.

== Business model and marketing ==
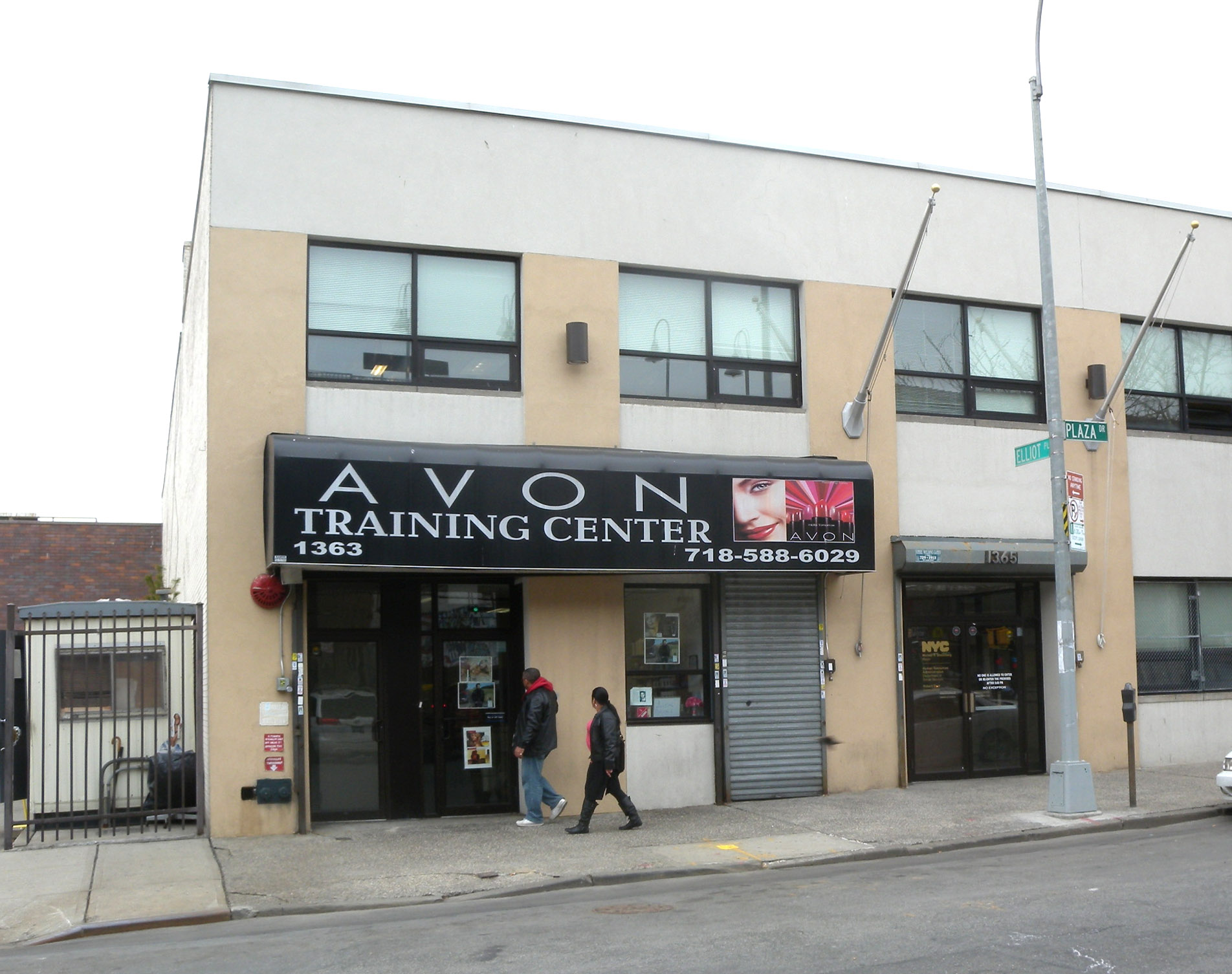
An Avon training center in the Bronx

Avon uses both door-to-door salespeople ("Avon ladies", as well as "Avon men") and brochures to advertise its products. Some Avon training centers have a small retail section with skin care products, such as creams, serums, makeup, and washes. Avon recruits sales representatives who sell beauty products, jewelry, accessories, and clothing. The salespeople are not employees, their income is solely based on the sales revenue or recruiting of further salespeople.

Some of the well-known brand products under the company are Avon Color (including Power Stay, Color Trend, Make Up + Care, and Ultra Colour franchise), Imari, Far Away, Avon Eve, Sk!n, Today Tomorrow Always fragrances, Black Suede, Wild Country, Fullspeed, Rare Scents, Avon Fashions, Anew (makeup and skincare franchise), Clearskin, Avon Care, Avon Senses, Skin So Soft among others. According to the U.S. government, Avon has 5 million to 6 million sales representatives operating in over 100 countries as of 2014. Avon and its subsidiaries have 40,000 to 50,000 employees, 6,000 of which are in the United States.

Avon was an early member of the U.S. Direct Selling Association, which was founded in 1910. The company left the association in 2014, saying that the trade group was not paying enough attention to the industry as a whole.

== Global markets and regional operations ==
Avon Products sells products in more than 100 countries. In 2010, Brazil overtook the United States as the company's largest market. By 2013, about 88% of Avon Products' revenue, approximately $10 billion, came from markets outside the United States.

Avon Products entered the Chinese market in 1990. After China banned direct selling in 1998, the company shifted sales to physical retail locations known as Beauty Boutiques. The ban was lifted in 2001, and Avon received a direct-selling licence in 2006.

In October 2013, Avon Products announced that it would close its operations in France at the end of the month. Employees accused the company of keeping workers uninformed for several months and acting contrary to its stated values of trust, respect, integrity, and open communication. By January 2014, Avon France had entered receivership.

On February 15, 2018, Avon Australia and New Zealand announced on Facebook that both operations would close by the end of the year. The closures resulted in the loss of 220 jobs and affected 21,400 sales representatives. The company drew criticism for poor communication with employees and customers.

In November 2023, Avon announced plans to open retail stores in the United Kingdom for the first time in the company's history. The company already operated a network of 63 stores in Turkey.

By January 2024, Avon Products continued operating in Russia, where it continued manufacturing products and recruiting employees.

== Financial decline and restructuring ==
In 2014, Avon Products reported its fifth consecutive year of declining global sales. Its North American revenue fell by 18% that year.

In March 2015, Avon Products was removed from the S&P 500 after being included in the index for 50 years.

In 2016, Avon Products separated its North American operations in the United States, Canada, and Puerto Rico into a new company, New Avon LLC, which continued to use the Avon name. The separation formed part of a three-year restructuring plan that also included moving Avon Products' global headquarters to London in the United Kingdom.

In July 2018, Avon Products sold its last remaining factory in the United States to the Fareva Group.

== Acquisitions, bankruptcy, and divestitures ==
On May 22, 2019, the Brazilian beauty company Natura agreed to buy Avon Products for more than $2 billion. Shareholders approved the acquisition in November 2019. The merger created what was described as the world's fourth-largest beauty company, with Natura taking a 76% stake in the combined business, which reported more than $10 billion in annual revenue. Following the acquisition, Avon Products stopped trading on the New York Stock Exchange.

In August 2019, New Avon LLC, the North American company that had separated from Avon Products in 2016, agreed to be acquired by the South Korean consumer goods company LG Household & Health Care for $125 million in cash.

In August 2024, Avon Products filed for Chapter 11 bankruptcy protection in an effort to resolve lawsuits related to talc-based products.

In September 2025, Natura announced that it would sell Avon International to Regent LP for £1. The sale excluded Avon operations in Latin America and Russia, which Natura retained. The transaction was completed on December 31, 2025.

In February 2026, Natura sold Avon Russia to the Arnest Group for $26.9 million.

On August 24, 2026, Avon International, through its parent company Regent LP, announced that it will acquire Avon North America from LG H&H. The acquisition will reunite Avon North America and Avon International under common ownership for the first time since 2016. The acquisition is expected to close by September 1. Alongside the agreement, Lisa Siders, currently the CCO of Avon International and Regent's operating partner for Avon, will become the CEO and lead the combined group upon closing. She succeeds Kristof Neirynck, who will be part of the company until the completion of the takeover. In a statement, LG H&H shared that the sale is part of a wider portfolio shift, with renewed focus on its K-Beauty and wellness efforts.

== Controversies ==
=== American corruption charges ===
Beginning in 2008, the conduct of various employees and executives of Avon Products were investigated for possible violations of the law, including bribery and violations of the Foreign Corrupt Practices Act.

Avon Products began a probe of its China division after an internal whistleblower alleged bribery in June 2008. At least four executives, both in Asia and in the United States, were suspended in 2010, and later fired for their roles in the activities being investigated. According to The New York Times, Avon spent over $170 million on legal fees and costs related to the investigation: $59 million in 2009 and $95 million in 2010, and $22.5 million for the first quarter of 2011. The final tally was about $500 million.

The Times reported that Avon Products would report the findings to the United States Department of Justice and the Securities and Exchange Commission (SEC) and try to negotiate the penalties that those entities may impose. On February 24, 2011, Avon filed a report with the Securities and Exchange commission highlighting the investigation as a corporate risk factor that could cause investor loss.

In 2014, Avon Products settled the bribery charges for a total of $135 million; $68 million in criminal penalties, with the remainder in interest, disgorgement, and fines from a civil case brought by the SEC.

=== Animal testing ===
Avon Products vowed in 1989 that as a company located in the United States, it would no longer participate in animal testing. Avon has since claimed to be working globally to introduce safer methods of testing cosmetics that do not require animals. These methods include in vitro testing, computer simulations, and testing cosmetics on human volunteers.

Although Avon Products does not practice animal testing of its cosmetics that are sold in the United States, certain specialty products do require extensive testing in other countries. In China, specialty products that require degrees of animal testing include but are not limited to: sunscreen products, whitening/pigmentation products, and hair dye/perm or growth products. Despite laws that require animal testing in some countries, Avon chooses to distribute its products in those jurisdictions. Laws in various countries require companies to pay for animal testing through a commercial business in order to sell certain products in that country. Because Avon Products is not globally animal-testing free, People for the Ethical Treatment of Animals (PETA) has not included Avon Products on their cruelty-free list.

In 2019, Avon Products ended all regulatory-required animal testing, making it the first global beauty company selling in China to stop all animal testing of ingredients and products across all its brands by developing new ways to deliver products that do not require animal testing, such as reformulating products. PETA has since announced that it has added Avon Products Inc. to their list of companies "Working for Regulatory Change".
