= 1877 in tennis =

This page covers all the important events in the sport of tennis in 1877. It provides the results of notable tournaments throughout the year on both the men's and women's ILTF tennis circuits.

== Australian Open ==
No event.

== French Open ==
Not a Grand Slam event.

== Wimbledon ==
Category	Champion(s)	Finalist(s)	Score
Final	(United Kingdom of Great Britain and Ireland) Spencer Gore	(United Kingdom of Great Britain and Ireland) William Marshall	6–1, 6–2, 6–4 (Note: It was Gore's only Grand Slam tournament title.)
Second place match	(United Kingdom of Great Britain and Ireland) William Marshall	(United Kingdom of Great Britain and Ireland) Charles Gilbert Heathcote	6–4, 6–4

== US Open ==
No event.
