= List of Surrey cricket captains =

Surrey County Cricket Club is one of eighteen county teams in England that play first-class cricket. The club is based in Kennington (formerly part of the county of Surrey). It was founded in 1845 after securing a lease on The Oval for its use as a cricket field. Surrey played their first first-class cricket match in 1846 against Marylebone Cricket Club and have gone on to win the County Championship on 21 occasions (plus one shared), a figure bettered only by Yorkshire. The club have played both List A cricket and Twenty20 cricket since their introductions into the English game in 1963 and 2003 respectively. The player appointed club captain leads the side in all their fixtures, except when unavailable through injury or some other reason. Players who captained the side as substitute for the official club captain are not included in the list below.

== History ==
Since attaining first-class status, Surrey have named 41 official captains, including two who have been appointed twice: George Strachan in the late nineteenth century and Errol Holmes, who had spells either side of the Second World War.

== List of club captains ==
- Years denotes the years for which the player was named as official club captain for Surrey.
- First denotes the date of the first match in which the player is recorded as captaining Surrey.
- Last denotes the date of the last match in which the player is recorded as captaining Surrey.
- FC denotes the number of first-class matches in which the player is recorded as captaining Surrey.
- LA denotes the number of List A matches in which the player captained Surrey.
- T20 denotes the number of Twenty20 matches in which the player captained Surrey.
- Total denotes the total number of first-class, List A and Twenty20 matches in which the player is recorded as captaining Surrey.

Note: In the club's earliest years, match scorecards do not always identify which player captained the side.

No.	Name	Nationality	Years	First	Last	FC	LA	T20	Total
1	Charles Hoare	England	1846–1850	20 May 1850 (Note: Prior to 1850, Surrey scorecards do not indicate who captained the side, but as club captain it was probably Charles Hoare.)	25 July 1850	5	–	–	5
2	Frederick Miller	England	1851–1857	28 September 1854	4 July 1867	54	–	–	54
3	Frederick Burbidge	England	1858–1865	30 July 1860	3 August 1865	17	–	–	17
4	Edward Dowson	England	1866	16 July 1863	30 July 1866	8	–	–	8
5	William Collyer	England	1867	30 May 1867	22 August 1867	10	–	–	10
6	Charles Calvert	England	1868	11 June 1868	27 August 1868	12	–	–	12
7	Swainson Akroyd	England	1869–1870	14 June 1869	20 June 1870	10	–	–	10
8	John Gregory	England	1871	25 August 1870	28 August 1871	18	–	–	18
9	George Strachan	England	1872–1875; 1877–1878	13 May 1872	19 July 1880	54	–	–	54
10	Allen Chandler	England	1876	12 August 1875	21 August 1876	9	–	–	9
11	A. P. Lucas	England	1879	16 July 1874	27 July 1882	41	–	–	41
12	John Shuter	England	1880–1893	13 August 1877	21 June 1909	274	–	–	274
13	Kingsmill Key	England	1894–1899	31 July 1881	13 June 1904	288	–	–	288
14	Digby Jephson	England	1900–1902	10 May 1894	27 June 1904	165	–	–	165
15	Livingstone Walker	England	1903	23 August 1900	31 August 1903	57	–	–	57
In 1904, no club captain appointment was made.
16	Lord Dalmeny (Note: Harry Primrose, 6th Earl of Rosebery, was known as Lord Dalmeny at the time of his captaincy.)	England	1905–1907	6 August 1903	23 August 1908	94	–	–	94
17	H. D. G. Leveson-Gower	England	1908–1910	19 August 1895	23 June 1920	122	–	–	122
18	Morice Bird	England	1911–1913	21 June 1909	13 August 1921	127	–	–	127
19	Cyril Wilkinson	England	1914–1920	13 May 1909	25 May 1920	53	–	–	53
20	Percy Fender	England	1921–1931	1 May 1920	1 Jul 1936	343	–	–	343
21	Douglas Jardine	England	1932–1933	20 July 1921	29 July 1933	141	–	–	141
22	Errol Holmes	England	1934–1938; 1947–1948	16 August 1924	22 June 1955	198	–	–	198
23	Monty Garland-Wells	England	1939	14 July 1928	30 August 1939	130	–	–	130
From 1940 to 1945, no club captain appointments were made due to the Second World War.
24	Nigel Harvie Bennett	England	1946	4 May 1946	4 September 1946	31	–	–	31
25	Michael Barton	England	1949–1951	5 May 1948	23 June 1954	110	–	–	110
26	Stuart Surridge	England	1952–1956	7 June 1947	10 October 1959	254	–	–	254
27	Peter May	England	1957–1962	19 July 1950	17 July 1963	208	–	–	208
28	Micky Stewart	England	1963–1972	14 July 1954	10 September 1972	498	75	–	573
29	John Edrich	England	1973–1977	3 September 1958	6 September 1978	410	149	–	559
30	Roger Knight	England	1978–1983	24 August 1968	2 September 1984	174	161	–	335
31	Geoff Howarth	New Zealand	1984–1985	5 June 1971	17 July 1985	188	170	–	358
32	Pat Pocock	England	1986	1 July 1964	13 September 1986	485	318	–	803
33	Ian Greig	England	1987–1991	25 April 1987	26 July 1992	157	118	–	275
34	Alec Stewart	England	1992–1996	8 August 1981	9 July 2003	266	321	–	587
35	Adam Hollioake	England	1997–2003	2 August 1992	31 August 2004	243	241	14	498
36	Jonathan Batty	England	2004	6 July 1997	23 September 2009	278	170	51	448
37	Mark Butcher (Note: In the absence through injury of Mark Butcher for most of the 2005 season, Mark Ramprakash led the side.) (Note: In the absence through injury of Mark Butcher for most of the 2009 season, Stewart Walters led the side.)	England	2005–2009	28 July 1991	10 July 2009	182	188	13	383
38	Rory Hamilton-Brown (Note: In his absence on compassionate leave for part of the 2012 season, Gareth Batty generally led the side. In August 2012 Hamilton-Brown announced that he was relinquishing the captaincy. Surrey said that Batty would continue as captain for the remainder of the season.)	England	2010–2012	24 July 2005	17 June 2012	–	–	–	–
39	Graeme Smith (Note: Smith was absent through injury for most of both 2013 and 2014. In 2013 Gareth Batty deputised, and in 2014 Gary Wilson did so.)	South Africa	2013–14	17 April 2013	18 May 2014	8	1	2	11
40	Gareth Batty	England	2015–2017	2015		–	–	–	–
41	Rory Burns (Note: Jade Dernbach to lead the side in T20 matches.)	England	2018–	2018		–	–	–	–
