= Henry Jones (writer) =

English author (1831–1899)

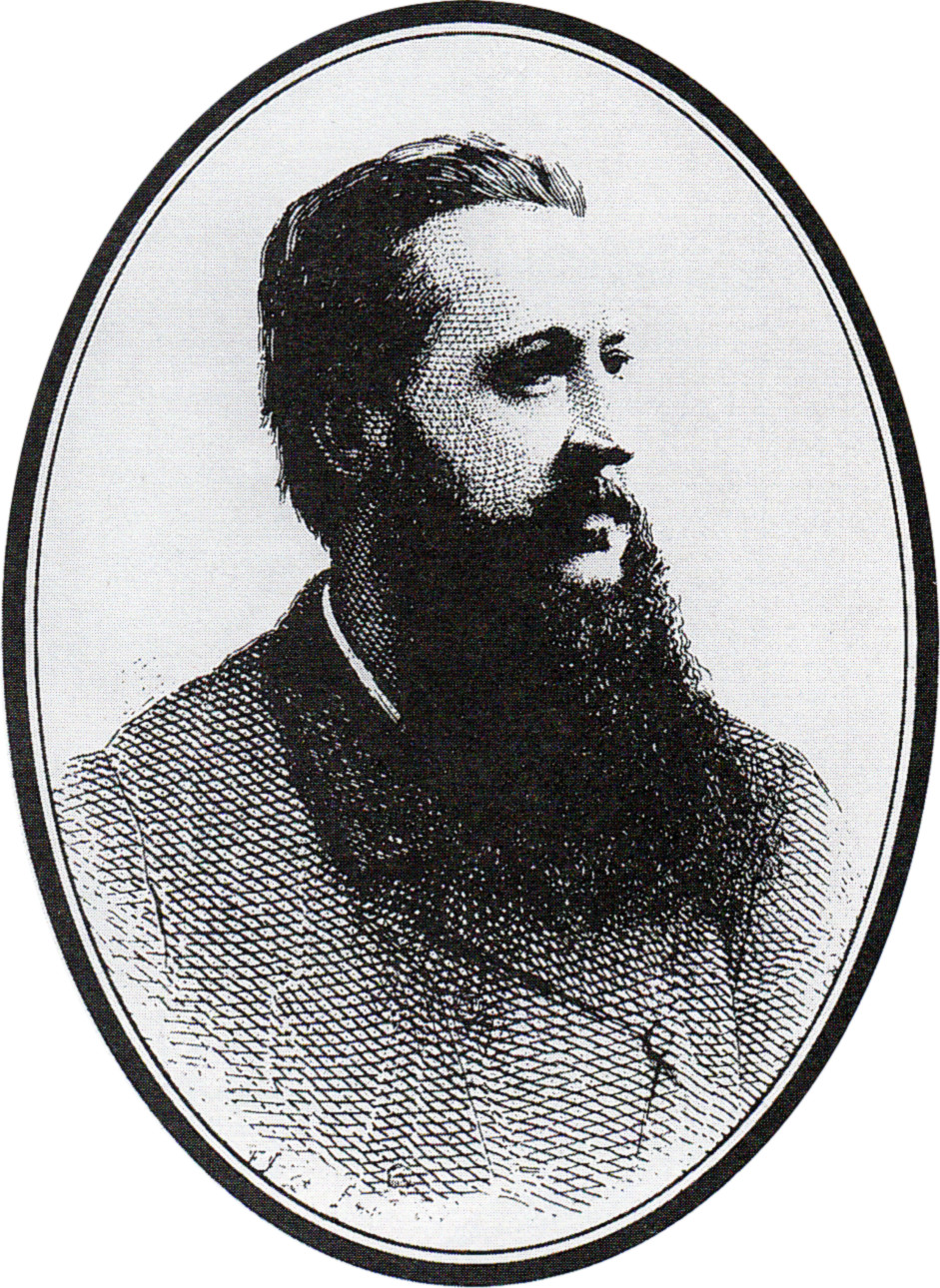
- Portrait of Cavendish
- Born: 2 November 1831; Soho, London, England
- Died: 10 February 1899 (aged 67); Paddington, London, England
- Occupations: Writer on whist and other games, physician
- Spouse: Harriet
- Writing career
- Pen name: Cavendish
- Period: From 1857 as writer

Henry Jones (2 November 1831 – 10 February 1899) was an English writer under the name "Cavendish", an authority on whist and other card games, tennis and other lawn games.

== Biography ==
Henry Jones was born in London, the eldest son of surgeon Henry Derviche Jones. He attended King's College School (then in London, now in Wimbledon) from 1842 to 1848, and entered St Bartholomew's Hospital as a student during the 1849/50 session. His signature can be seen in the hospital's archives in the student signature book (a book that students signed when they began their studies) for the 1849/50 and 1850/1 sessions, where his address is given as 23 Soho Square.

Jones qualified MRCS (Member of the Royal College of Surgeons) in 1852 and practised medicine as a general practitioner (GP) until 1869 when he changed tack and became a full-time writer on games and sport. His writing career can be traced back to 1857 when he began writing about whist. Jones's father had been a keen devotee of this trick-taking card game, and under his tutelage, Jones had become a good player at an early age. He was a member of several whist clubs, and in 1862 he published The Laws and Principles of Whist: Stated and Explained and its Practice Illustrated on an Original System by Means of Hands Played Completely Through by "Cavendish", which became the leading treatise on the game. This work was followed by treatises on the laws of the card games of piquet and écarté. Jones became widely known as "Cavendish" (Note: Jones chose his pen name after a whist club of which he was a member and which was located at Cavendish Square.) and wrote extensively in The Field, the world's original country and fieldsports magazine, which was founded in 1853. As "Cavendish" he also wrote on billiards, lawn tennis and croquet, and contributed articles on whist and other table games to the ninth edition (1889) of the Encyclopædia Britannica.

== Lawn tennis ==
In 1869 Jones joined the All England Croquet Club, which had been founded the previous year. He was later voted onto the club's committee and was secretary for a brief period in 1871. In 1875 Jones proposed that one of the club's croquet lawns should be set aside for playing lawn tennis, which proved to be a significant step. In 1877, club secretary John Walsh proposed that a lawn tennis championship be held, and "Wimbledon" was born. Jones and two other prominent men, Julian Marshall and Charles Gilbert Heathcote, formed a sub-committee to frame the rules, many of which survive today, and Jones was referee at The Championships from 1877 to 1885.

The only tournament of the inaugural 1877 Wimbledon Championship was the Gentlemen's Singles, which was won from a field of 22 competitors by Spencer Gore, an Old Harrovian rackets player. The final attracted a crowd of about 200 spectators, who each paid one shilling.

The Ladies' Singles tournament was inaugurated in 1884 when Maud Watson became the champion from an entry of just 13 players. The same year, the Gentlemen's Doubles was started, with a trophy donated to the club by Oxford University Lawn Tennis Club following the cessation of their own doubles championship.

Henry Jones died in 1899 when the fortunes of Wimbledon were at a low ebb. Public affection for the championships had waned in the 1890s and Jones' obituaries largely ignored his role in lawn tennis.

== Legacy ==
Cavendish Road in Brisbane, Queensland, Australia was named after his pen name Cavendish by early residents who were keen whist players.

== Publications ==
- The Laws and Principles of Whist Stated and Explained and its Practice Illustrated on an Original System by Means of Hands Played Completely Through. Spine Title: Cavendish on Whist. Thos. De La Rue & Co. (London), Eighth edition, 1868, 120 pages.
- The Laws and Principles of Whist Stated and Explained and its Practice Illustrated on an Original System by Means of Hands Played Completely Through. Spine Title: Cavendish on Whist. John Wurtle Lovell (New York), From the Twelfth English Edition Revised and Greatly Enlarged, 1881, 257 pages.
- The Games of Lawn-Tennis (With the Authorized Laws) and Badminton. Thos. De La Rue & Co. (London), 1876, 30 pages. Reprinted in at least eight other editions in the nineteenth century.
- Whist Developments: American Leads and the Plain-Suit Echo, De La Rue & Co. (London), 1885, 172 pages.
- Patience Games: with Examples Played Through Illustrated with Numerous Diagrams. Thos. De La Rue & Co. (London), 1890.
