= Bayly Akroyd =

English cricketer

Personal information
- Full name: Bayly Nash Akroyd
- Born: 27 April 1850; Streatham, Surrey, England
- Died: 24 November 1926 (aged 76); Marylebone, London, England
- Batting: Right-handed
- Bowling: Unknown-arm roundarm slow
- Relatives: Swainson Akroyd (brother)

Domestic team information
- Years: Team
- 1879: Marylebone Cricket Club
- 1872–1873: Surrey

Career statistics
Competition	First-class
Matches	8
Runs scored	129
Batting average	8.60
100s/50s	–/–
Top score	30
Balls bowled	24
Wickets	–
Bowling average	–
5 wickets in innings	–
10 wickets in match	–
Best bowling	–
Catches/stumpings	9/–
- Source: Cricinfo, 14 April 2013

Bayly Nash Akroyd (27 April 1850 – 24 November 1926) was an English first-class cricketer and tennis player.

== Cricket career ==
Akroyd was born at Streatham in April 1850 and was educated at Radley College. He made his debut in first-class cricket for Surrey in 1872 against Nottinghamshire at The Oval, with him making a further appearance in that season against Kent at the same venue. The following season he made a single first-class appearance for the Surrey Club against the Marylebone Cricket Club at Lord's, before also making four first-class appearances in that season for Surrey. He later made a final first-class appearance for the Marylebone Cricket Club against Kent in 1879 at the Higher Common Ground, Tunbridge Wells. Akroyd made a total of eight appearances in first-class cricket, scoring a total of 129 at an average of 8.60, with a high score of 30. For Surrey he scored 108 runs at an average of 9.00.

== Tennis career ==
In addition to playing first-class cricket, Akroyd also played tennis and competed in the inaugural Wimbledon Championship in 1877, where he defeated George Nicole in the first round, before losing in straight sets to William Marshall in the second round. Akroyd died at Marylebone on 24 November 1926. His brother, Swainson, also played first-class cricket.
