= 1877 Wimbledon Championship – Singles =

Singles
- 1877 Wimbledon Championship

Final
- Champions: (United Kingdom) Spencer Gore
- Runners-up: (United Kingdom) William Marshall
- Score: 6–1, 6–2, 6–4

Details
- Draw: 22
- Seeds: –

Events
Singles
Wimbledon Championship	· 1878 →

Spencer Gore defeated William Marshall, 6–1, 6–2, 6–4 in the final to win the inaugural Gentlemen's Singles tennis title at the 1877 Wimbledon Championships.

== Draw ==
=== Key ===
- Q = Qualifier
- WC = Wild card
- LL = Lucky loser
- Alt = Alternate
- SE = Special exempt
- PR = Protected ranking
- ITF = ITF entry
- JE = Junior exempt
- w/o = Walkover
- r = Retired
- d = Defaulted
- SR = Special ranking

=== Finals ===
Semifinals
(United Kingdom) Spencer Gore	6	6	6
(United Kingdom) Charles Heathcote	2	5	2
(United Kingdom) William Marshall
bye

Final
(United Kingdom) Spencer Gore	6	6	6
(United Kingdom) William Marshall	1	2	4
Second Place
(United Kingdom) Charles Heathcote	4	4
(United Kingdom) William Marshall	6	6

=== Earlier rounds ===
==== Section 1 ====
First round
(United Kingdom) Harry Thomas Gillson	2	0	3
(United Kingdom) Spencer Gore	6	6	6
(United Kingdom) Robert Dalby	4	2	6	2
(United Kingdom) Montague Hankey	6	6	3	6
(United Kingdom) John Baker	6	6	6
(United Kingdom) John William Trist	1	4	0
(United Kingdom) Francis Langham	w/o
(United Kingdom) Charles Buller

Second round
(United Kingdom) S Gore	6	4	6	6
(United Kingdom) M Hankey	4	6	2	1
(United Kingdom) J Baker	3	6	0	5
(United Kingdom) FN Langham	6	4	6	6

Quarterfinals
(United Kingdom) S Gore	6	6	5	6
(United Kingdom) FN Langham	3	2	6	1

==== Section 2 ====
First round
(United Kingdom) Henry Wheeler	2	5	2
(United Kingdom) Lestocq Robert Erskine	6	6	6
(United Kingdom) Henry Soden	1	5	5
(United Kingdom) J Lambert	6	6	6
(United Kingdom) Bayly Akroyd	6	6	6
(United Kingdom) George Nicol	0	0	4
(United Kingdom) William Marshall	6	6	6
(United Kingdom) Frederick Dorville Jackson	3	5	0

Second round
(United Kingdom) R Erskine	6	6
(United Kingdom) J Lambert	2	1^{r}
(United Kingdom) BN Akroyd	4	2	2
(United Kingdom) W Marshall	6	6	6

Quarterfinals
(United Kingdom) R Erskine	5	6	4	1
(United Kingdom) W Marshall	6	5	6	6

==== Section 3 ====
First round
(United Kingdom) Frederick Oliver	6	6	6
(United Kingdom) Montague Battye	1	1	1
(United Kingdom) Julian Marshall	3	1	6	6	6
(United Kingdom) Capt. Grimston	6	6	2	3	3
(United Kingdom) Charles Heathcote	6	6	6
(United Kingdom) Geoffrey Buxton	0	2	3

Second round
(United Kingdom) FW Oliver	6	5	1	6	3
(United Kingdom) J Marshall	4	6	6	4	6
(United Kingdom) C Heathcote
bye

Quarterfinals
(United Kingdom) J Marshall	3	3	5
(United Kingdom) C Heathcote	6	6	6
