= Frederick Dorville Jackson =

English coffee planter and tennis player

Frederick Jackson
- Full name: Frederick Dorville Jackson
- Country (sports): GBR
- Born: 6 June 1859 Bentley, Hampshire, England
- Died: 15 March 1878 (age 18) Mercara, Mysore, India
- Turned pro: 1877 (amateur tour)
- Retired: 1877

Singles

Grand Slam singles results
- Wimbledon: 1R (1877)

Frederick Dorville Jackson (6 June 1859 – 15 March 1878) was an English coffee planter and tennis player who competed at the first Wimbledon Championships in 1877.

== Biography ==
Jackson was born on 6 June 1859 in Bentley, Hampshire, England. he was the son of the Reverend C. Jackson of Bentley, Farnham, Hants. He attended the English public school Marlborough College in Marlborough, Wiltshire. In 1876, he represented Marlborough College at the Annual Public Schools Rackets Championship, which was held at the original Prince's Club in Hans Place, London.

In July 1877 he took part in first Wimbledon Championship where he was defeated in the first round by the eventual finalist William Marshall in straight sets. Following his Wimbledon appearance he left to work as a coffee planter in Ceylon. He died from complications due to meningitis in Mercara, Mysore, India on 15 March 1878 aged 18.
