= John Heathcote (cricketer) =

English cricketer

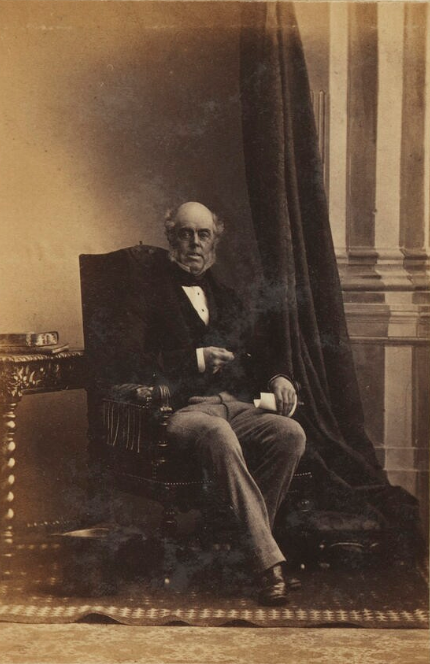
- Portrait photograph (1860) by Camille Silvy

Personal information
- Full name: John Moyer Heathcote
- Born: 9 November 1800; London, England
- Died: 27 March 1892 (aged 91); Conington Castle, Huntingdonshire

Domestic team information
- Years: Team
- 1820: Cambridge University
- Source: CricketArchive, 31 March 2013

John Moyer Heathcote (9 November 1800 – 27 March 1892) was the son of John Heathcote. He was an English cricketer who played for Cambridge University in two matches in 1820, totalling 33 runs with a highest score of 19.

John Moyer Heathcote was educated at Eton College and St John's College, Cambridge. He stood for election as MP for Huntingdonshire in 1857 and was elected but his return was subsequently invalidated.

== Personal life ==
He married on 11 April 1833 the Honourable Emily Frances Ridley-Colborne (1811 – 13 October 1849), daughter of Nicholas Ridley-Colborne, 1st Baron Colborne. They had five children:

- John Moyer Heathcote (12 July 1834 – 3 August 1912) he married Louisa Cecilia MacLeod (1838 – 20 January 1910) they had four children.
- William George Heathcote (6 February 1836 – November 1857).
- Mary Emily Heathcote (1839 – 9 June 1932).
- Charles Gilbert Heathcote (2 March 1849 – 15 November 1913) he married 1869 Lucy Edith Wrottesley (1848 – 19 February 1918) daughter of Walter Wrottesley (1810 – 1872), they had three children:
  - Walter John Heathcote (23 September 1870 – 15 November 1936).
  - Isabel Lucy Heathcote (1872 – 27 November 1961).
  - Mabel Frances Heathcote (1873 – 9 January 1955).
- Henry Francis Heathcote (11 August 1849 – October 1854)

John Moyer Heathcote was buried in All Saints churchyard Conington. Grave at east end of Conington parish churchyard, inscription: "In memory of John Heathcote died 1838 John Moyer Heathcote died 1892 and other members of the family."

A wall tablet in the south transept of Conington church is inscribed: "Sacred to the Memory of the Honble Emily Frances Heathcote 3rd daughter of Lord and Lady Colborne and the beloved wife of John Moyer Heathcote of Conington Castle. She died Oct 1849 aged 37 years leaving four sons and one daughter. This tablet has been erected by her sorrowing husband as a token of his deep love and of his lasting affection to her Memory. I am the resurrection and the life, he that believeth in me thou he were dead, yet shall he live and whosoever believeth in me shall never die."

Wall tablet south transept Conington church with coloured marble surround: "In Memory of John Moyer Heathcote Esq eldest son of John Heathcote Esq of Conington. Born Dec 1800 married Apr 1833 the Honble Emily Frances 3rd daughter of Lord Colborne. Died at Conington Castle in March 1892 in the 92nd year of his age. He giveth his beloved sleep''.

== Publication ==
- Reminiscences of Fen and Mere (illustrated with his own sketches), Longmans, Green, and Co., London, 1876

== Bibliography ==
- Haygarth, Arthur (1862). Scores & Biographies, Volume 1 (1744–1826). Lillywhite.
