= William Collyer =

William Collyer may refer to:

- William Bengo' Collyer (1782–1854), English Congregational minister and religious writer
- William Collyer (Surrey cricketer) (1841–1908), English cricketer
- William Collyer (lawyer) (1842–1928), English lawyer and amateur cricketer
