= Charles Gilbert Heathcote =

English barrister and tennis player

- Country (sports): (United Kingdom)
- Born: 2 March 1841; Conington, Huntingdonshire, England
- Died: 15 November 1913 (aged 72); Kilmeston, Hampshire, England

Singles

Grand Slam singles results
- Wimbledon: SF (1877)

Charles Gilbert Heathcote (2 March 1841 – 15 November 1913) was an English barrister and tennis player. He was one of the founders of the All England Club, and played in the first Wimbledon Championships in 1877.

== Biography ==
Heathcote was born at Conington Castle, Conington, Huntingdonshire, the third son of John Heathcote of Conington Castle Huntingdon and his third wife Emily Colbourne. He was educated at Eton College and was admitted at Trinity College, Cambridge, on 6 April 1859. He was a scholar and migrated to Emmanuel College, Cambridge on 20 June 1863, being awarded an MA in 1866. He was admitted at Inner Temple on 26 January 1865 and was called to the bar on 18 November 1867. He served on the South Eastern Circuit.

Heathcote was one of the founders of the All England Lawn Tennis and Croquet Club. He is cited as one of the committee that formulated the rules of tennis in 1877 before the first Wimbledon Championships although some other sources erroneously suggest that the Heathcote concerned was his brother John Moyer Heathcote who was a representative of the MCC committee that formulated the Laws of Tennis in 1875. In the inaugural 1877 Wimbledon Championship he reached the semi-final of the Men's singles when he was defeated by Spencer Gore and lost to William Marshall in the 3rd place play-off. He played again in 1878 and reached the quarter-finals in 1879. He last entered in 1880. Heathcote was also a member of the Alpine Club and an amateur artist.

From 1884 to 1902, Heathcote was a Stipendiary Magistrate for Brighton. He acquired Kilmeston Manor, Alresford, Hampshire in 1902 and became a J.P. for Hampshire in 1906.

Heathcote married Lucy Edith Wrottesley (1848 – 19 February 1918), daughter of Hon. Walter Wrottesley on 9 September 1869 at St James Westminster. They had three children:

- Walter John Heathcote (23 September 1870 – 15 November 1936) was a consul in Turkey.
- Isabel Lucy Heathcote (1872 – 27 November 1961) married on 16 July 1910 at St George's Hanover Square London Harry Broke (11 May 1864 – 23 November 1923), they had two children.
- Mabel Frances Heathcote (1873 – 9 January 1955) married in 1919 Gwyn Vaughan-Morgan (1873 – 31 My 1945).

Charles Gilbert Heathcote died at Alresford, Hampshire, Lucy Edith Heathcote died at Eastbourne Sussex.
