= Swainson Akroyd =

English cricketer

Personal information
- Full name: Swainson Howden Akroyd
- Born: 13 November 1848; Streatham, Surrey, England
- Died: 5 December 1925 (aged 77); Marylebone, London, England
- Batting: Right-handed
- Relatives: Bayly Akroyd (brother)

Domestic team information
- Years: Team
- 1870–1871: Marylebone Cricket Club
- 1869–1878: Surrey
- 1870–1875: Gentlemen of England
- 1873: South of England

Career statistics
| Competition | First-class |
|---|---|
| Matches | 33 |
| Runs scored | 930 |
| Batting average | 17.22 |
| 100s/50s | –/4 |
| Top score | 87 |
| Balls bowled | – |
| Wickets | – |
| Bowling average | – |
| 5 wickets in innings | – |
| 10 wickets in match | – |
| Best bowling | – |
| Catches/stumpings | 7/– |
- Source: Cricinfo, 7 September 2014

Swainson Howden Akroyd (13 November 1848 – 5 December 1925) was an English first-class cricketer. He was a right-handed batsman. He was born in Streatham, Surrey, and was educated at Radley College.

Akroyd made his first-class debut for Surrey in 1869 against Oxford University at The Oval, and was captain of Surrey in 1869 and 1870. He made his highest first-class score of 87 against Sussex in 1872. He played 33 first-class matches between 1869 and 1878, scoring 930 runs at an average of 17.22. For Surrey he played 23 matches, scoring 622 runs at an average of 15.55.

He died in Marylebone, London on 5 December 1925. His brother Bayly Akroyd also played first-class cricket.
