= Smiths Gore =

Former chartered surveyor firm

Smiths Gore was a firm of chartered surveyors with 32 offices and 18 estate offices across the UK. It was noted for its rural property consultancy services.

== History ==
The firm was started in 1847 when John Pickering and Edmund James Smith formed a partnership known as Pickering and Smith in London. Smith later became President of the Surveyors' Institute.

His son-in-law, Wimbledon tennis champion Spencer William Gore, joined Smith in the business, and the firm was renamed Smiths and Gore.

In June 2015, the firm was acquired by Savills.

== Services ==
The company's practice covered estate management, farm management, property management, forestry, sporting and farm management, commercial property investment, planning and development, architectural services, building surveying, sales, lettings and acquisitions, minerals and telecommunications, wayleaves and easements advice.
