= Harry Few =

English cricketer (1848–1931)

Personal information
- Full name: Harry Gleaves Few
- Born: 8 September 1848; Willingham, Cambridgeshire, England
- Died: 9 April 1931 (aged 82); Newnham, Cambridgeshire, England
- Height: 5 ft 5 in (1.65 m)
- Batting: Right-handed
- Bowling: Left-arm roundarm medium

Domestic team information
- Years: Team
- 1866: Cambridgeshire

Career statistics
Competition	First-class
Matches	2
Runs scored	4
Batting average	1.00
100s/50s	–/–
Top score	4
Balls bowled	308
Wickets	8
Bowling average	21.25
5 wickets in innings	1
10 wickets in match	–
Best bowling	5/72
Catches/stumpings	1/–
- Source: Cricinfo, 10 March 2022

Harry Gleaves Few JP (8 September 1848 – 9 April 1931) was an English first-class cricketer.

The son of Edward Few, he was born at the Cambridgeshire village of Willingham in September 1848. He played first-class cricket for Cambridgeshire, making his debut aged 17 against Cambridge University at Fenner's in 1866. He had success in this match, taking a five wicket haul in the Cambridge University first innings with figures of 5 for 72 with his left-arm roundarm medium bowling. He made a second first-class match in the same season against Nottinghamshire, but did not appear for Cambridgeshire after. Across these two matches, he took 8 wickets at an average of 21.25. It was noted by Fred Lillywhite that Few generally fielded at slip or point.

Outside of cricket, Few was a merchant at Willingham and was a member of the Cambridge Antiquarian Society. He was a justice of the peace for Cambridgeshire by 1912. He lived in a house built for him at 12 Grange Road and originally called "Berrycroft" (in 2023, the site was purchased by Cambridge University's Queens' College, to be used as student accommodation). Few died aged 82 in April 1931, following a period of long ill health.
