= John Heathcote (1767–1838) =

British politician

Member of the British Parliament for Gatton
- In office 1796–1798

Member of the British Parliament for Ripon
- In office 1798–1806

High Sheriff of Cambridgeshire and Huntingdonshire
- In office 1809–1810

Personal details
- Born: 14 November 1767
- Died: 3 May 1838 (aged 70)
- Spouse: Mary Anne Thornhill (m. 1799)
- Children: 5, including John Moyer Heathcote and Robert Boothby Heathcote
- Parents: John Heathcote (father); Lydia Moyer (mother)
- Education: Queens' College, Cambridge

John Heathcote (14 November 1767 – 3 May 1838) was a British politician, MP for Gatton from 1796 to 1798, and for Ripon from 1798 to 1806.

== Biography ==
He was the son of John Heathcote (died 1795) and Lydia Moyer, and the grandson of Sir John Heathcote, 2nd Baronet (1689–1759), MP for Grantham and Bodmin. He was educated at Queens' College, Cambridge.

He was MP for Gatton from 1796 to 1798, and for Ripon from 1798 to 1806 and appointed High Sheriff of Cambridgeshire and Huntingdonshire for 1809–10.

He married on 5 November 1799 Mary Anne Thornhill (d. 27 July 1854), the daughter of George Thornhill. They lived at Conington Castle, Huntingdonshire, and had five children:

- John Moyer Heathcote (9 November 1800 – 27 March 1892)
- Mary Anne Lydia Heathcote (c. 1803 – 10 October 1876) married George Hussey Packe (1797 – 1874) and had two children
- Reverend Robert Boothby Heathcote (13 May 1805 – 19 September 1865)
- Frances Catherine Heathcote (c. 1810 – 25 January 1882) married William Henry Rooper (1808 – 1893) and had six children
- Reverend George Heathcote (11 January 1811 – 9 March 1895) married Catherine Sophia Southeby (1812 – 1 August 1840). Rector of Conington. Both are buried at All Saints church Conington.

John Heathcote died on 3 May 1838 in St George's Hanover Square London and was buried on 12 May 1838 at All Saints church Conington Huntingdonshire. His grave is located at the east end of Conington parish churchyard which is inscribed: "In memory of John Heathcote died 1838 John Moyer Heathcote died 1891 and other members of the family." There is a wall tablet in the south transept of Conington church with the inscription: "Near this place are deposited the remains of John Heathcote Esq. After a residence of 38 years at Conington Castle he died May 1838 deeply and justly lamented by his relatives, his neighbours and his friends. His son John Moyer Heathcote has caused this stone to be erected as a token of appreciation, gratitude and esteem."

Mary Ann Heathcote died on 27 July 1854 in St George's Hanover Square London and was buried on 2 August 1854 at All Saints church Conington Huntingdonshire. Another wall tablet in the south transept of Conington church is inscribed: "In memory of Mary Anne Heathcote relict of John Heathcote Esq. She died July 1854 aged 72 years. This tablet is erected by her son John Moyer Heathcote as a tribute of affection and esteem. Looking for that blessed hope, and the glorious appearing of the Great God our Saviour Jesus Christ."
