= West Side House, Wimbledon =

House in Wimbledon, London, England

Coordinates: 51.423409°N 0.227918°W

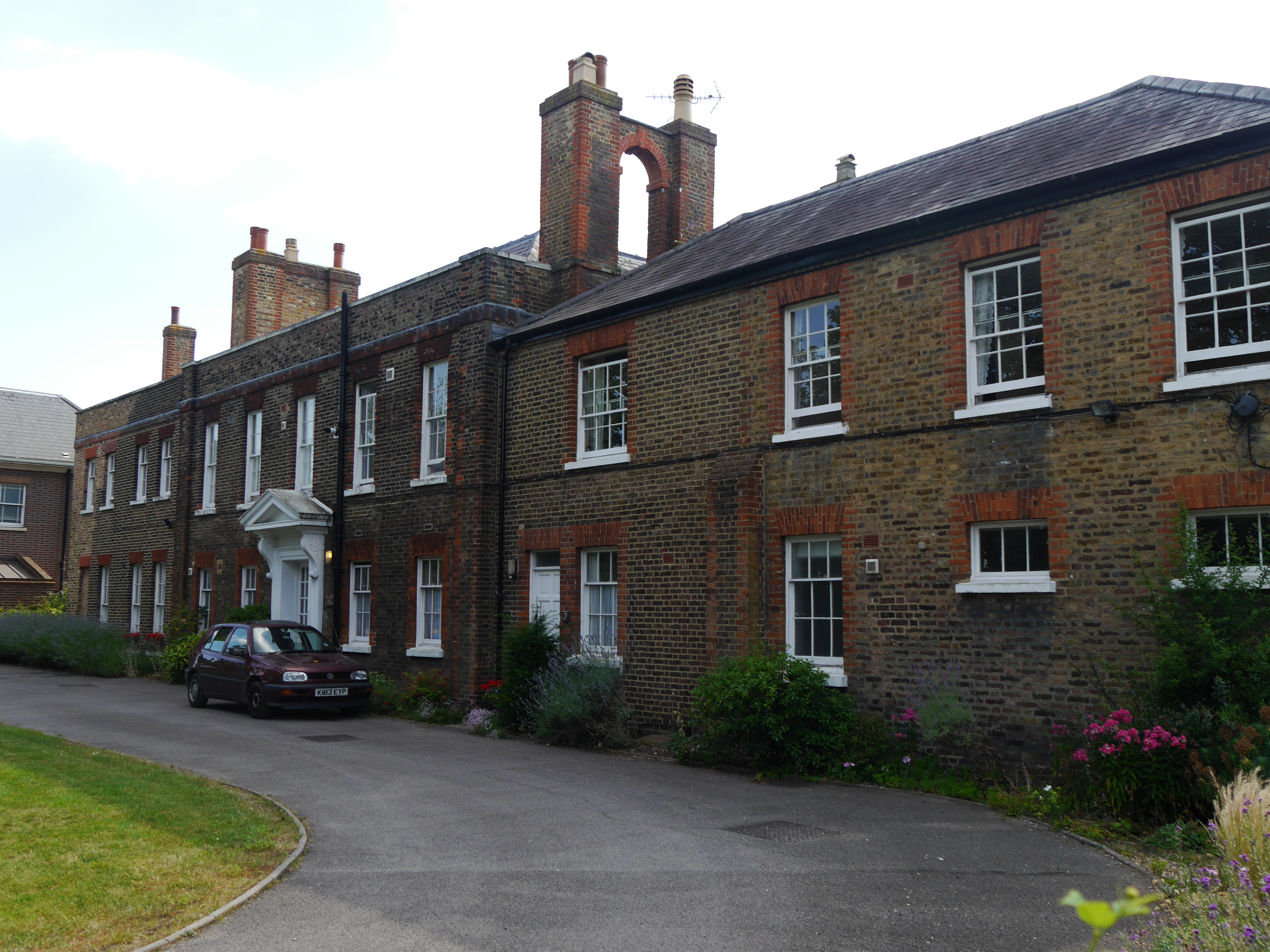
West Side House, 2016

West Side House is a Grade II listed house on the west side of Wimbledon Common, Wimbledon, London, built in about 1760 or earlier.

Spencer Gore, who won the first Wimbledon lawn tennis championship in 1877 and played for Surrey County Cricket Club, was born and raised at West Side House.
