= Julian Marshall =

British music and print collector, tennis player and writer

- Country (sports): England
- Born: 24 June 1836 Headingley, Leeds, England
- Died: 21 November 1903 (aged 67) Hampstead, London, England

Grand Slam singles results
- Wimbledon: QF (1877)

Julian Marshall (24 June 1836 – 21 November 1903) was an English music and print collector, tennis player and writer.

== Life ==
Marshall was born in Headingley, Yorkshire, to a flax-spinning family. His father, John Marshall, had been a Member of Parliament (MP) for Leeds. His grandfather was industrialist John Marshall, who was also an MP. Marshall attended Harrow School in London, before joining the family business. As a young man, Marshall started collecting prints, and later, music manuscripts. He was also a music writer and contributed work to the first edition of the Grove Dictionary of Music and Musicians.

Marshall codified the rules of real tennis in 1872. In 1873 he played an important early lawn match with William Hart Dyke and John Moyer Heathcote at Lullingstone Castle. By 1877 the All England Lawn Tennis and Croquet Club was proposing the first Wimbledon Championships, and a review of the rules was required. Marshall, with his fellow MCC commissioner Heathcote and Henry Jones of the All England club, laid down the rules that are little changed to this day, in time for the first Wimbledon tournament on 9 July 1877.

Marshall died on 21 November 1903 at Hampstead.

== Publications ==
- The Annals of Tennis (1878)
- Lawn-tennis,: With the laws adopted by the M.C.C., and A.E.C. & L.T.C., and Badminton by Julian Marshall (1879)
- Tennis cuts and quips,: In prose and verse, with rules and wrinkles (1884)
- Tennis, racquets, fives 1890 Bell (with J Spens and Ja Arnan Tate)

== Family ==
Marshall married Florence Ashton Thomas on 7 October 1864. She was a musician and author of Handel (1883) and Life and letters of Mary W. Shelley (2 vols. 1889). One of their three daughters was Dorothy Marshall, who became a noted chemist.
