= George Strachan =

English cricketer

George Strachan was an English cricketer. He was born at Prestbury, near Cheltenham, 21 November 1850. His height was 6 ft. 1 in.; weight, 13 st. According to W. G. Grace:

He was a good bowler and batsman: but it was by his brilliant fielding that he made his reputation; and there can be little doubt that at long-leg or cover-point he had few equals in his own time. Many a batsman, having hit a ball in the direction of cover-point, started to run, being ignorant of his wonderful quickness and great reach, and feeling certain he could never get to it; but not only did he get to it, but picking it up with surprising quickness, he had it into the wicket-keeper's or bowler's hands like a flash and seconds before the batsman had reached his crease!

At Cheltenham College, where he was educated, they tell of a smart bit of fielding which he did when the M.C.C. played the College Eleven one year. He was bowling to George Hearne, who stepped back and pulled him twice between the wicket and mid-on. The third ball was bowled in the same place, and Hearne pulled it again; but Mr. Strachan moved a yard or two when he saw him make up his mind to hit in the same way, and brought off a remarkable catch yards from the wicket.

As a batsman he had sound defence, and hit freely.

He represented Gloucestershire, Middlesex, and Surrey. He captained Surrey from 1872 to 1875 and from 1877 to 1878. For the Gentlemen v. Players in 1872 he met with marked success as a bowler, and in the same match at The Oval in 1875 he took five wickets in 21 balls, off which no runs were scored.

George Strachan died on 29 December 1901, at Middelburg, Transvaal, South Africa.
