= Grange Road, Cambridge =

Street in Cambridge, England

Coordinates: 52.204°N 0.1057°E

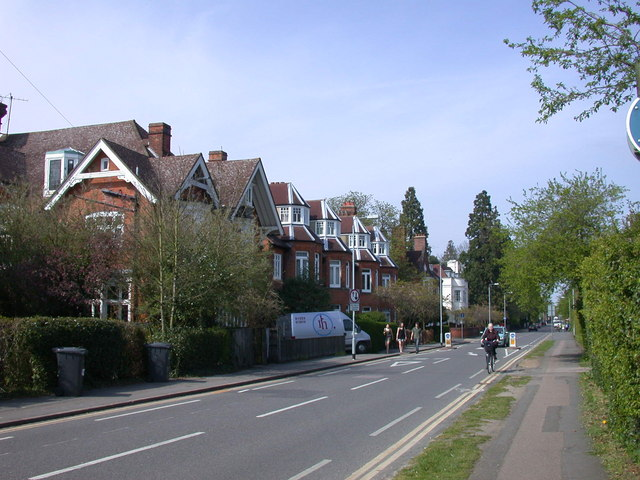
Houses in Grange Road

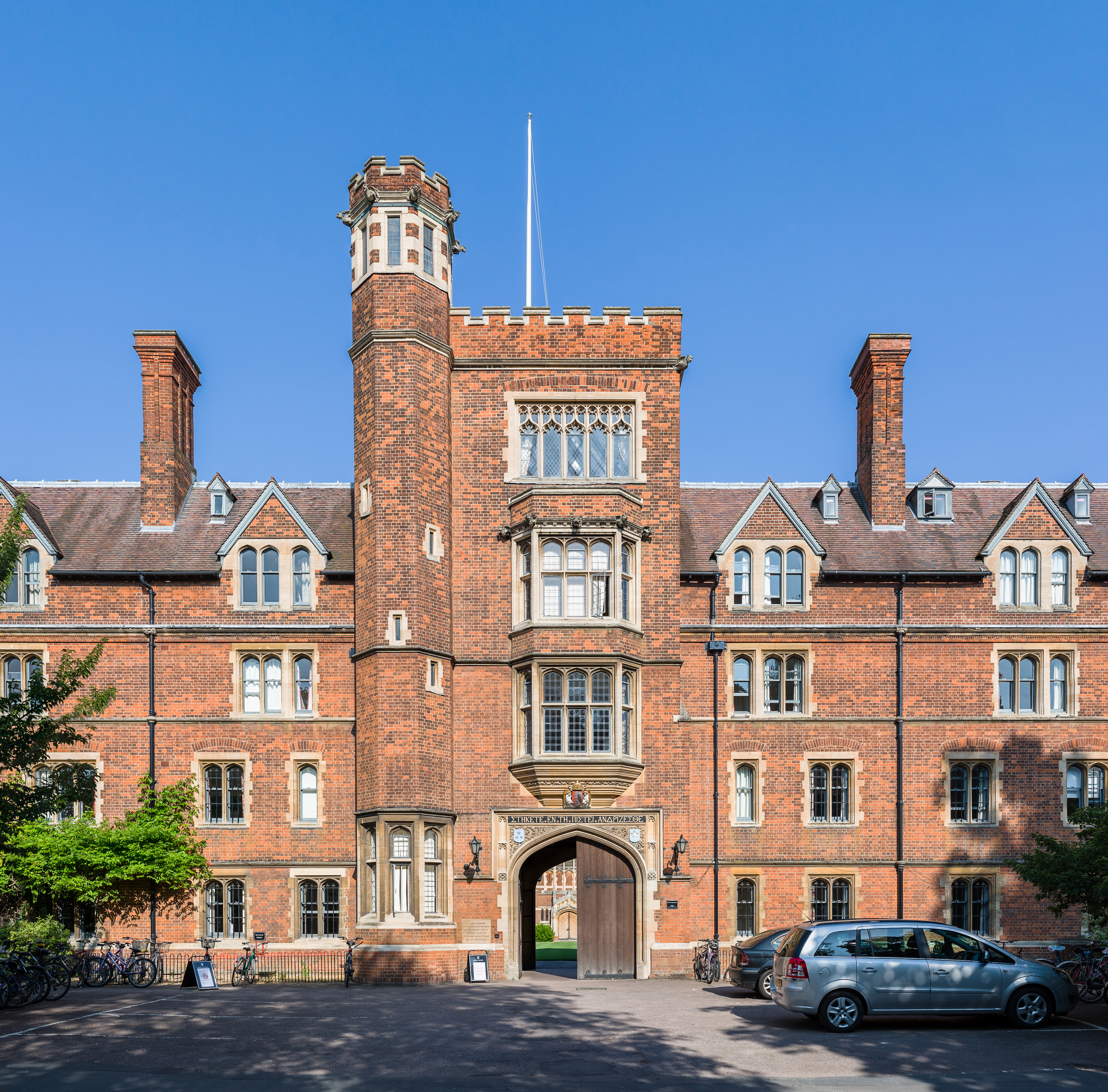
Selwyn College Grange Road Gate

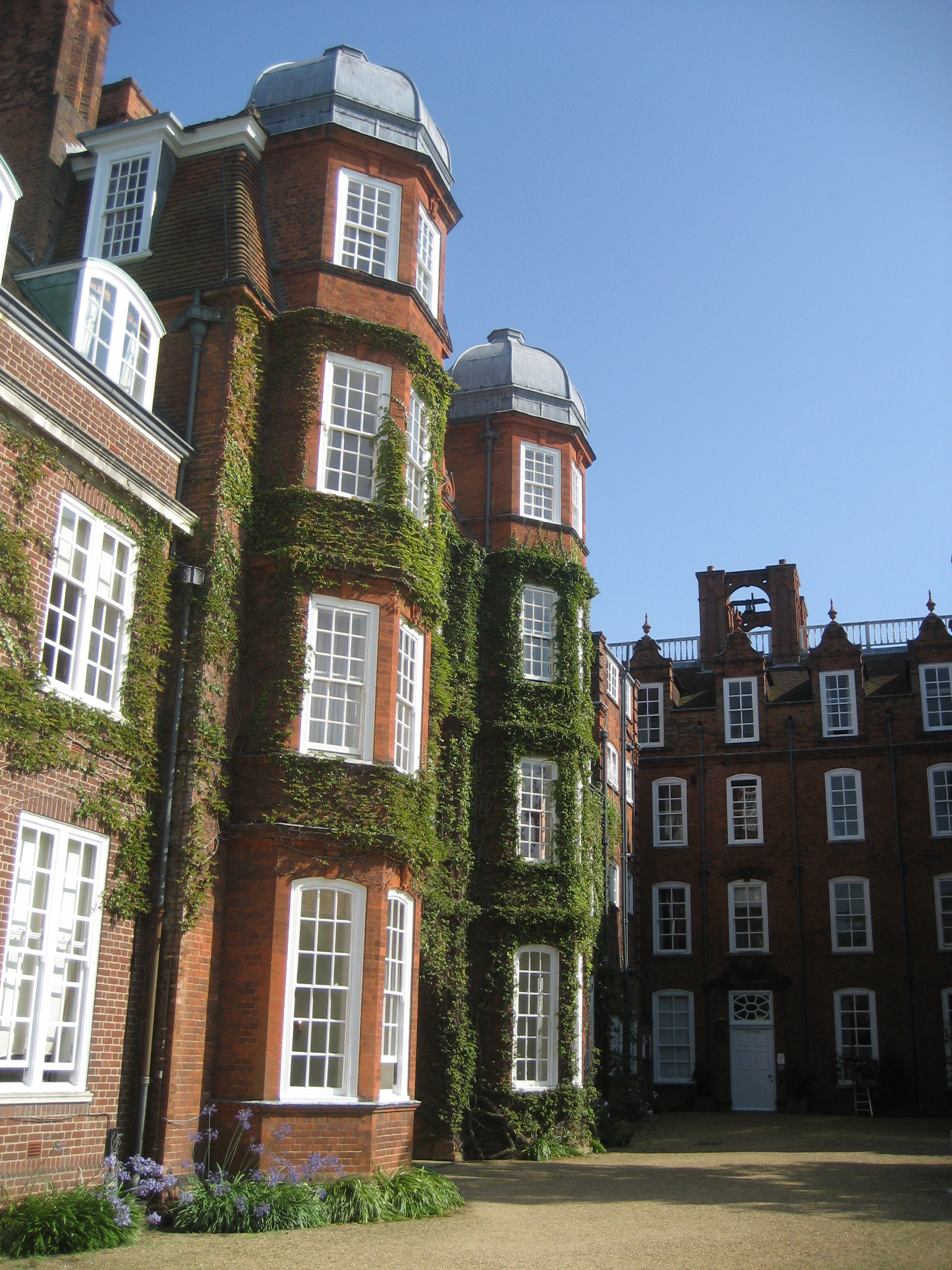
Newnham College on Grange Road

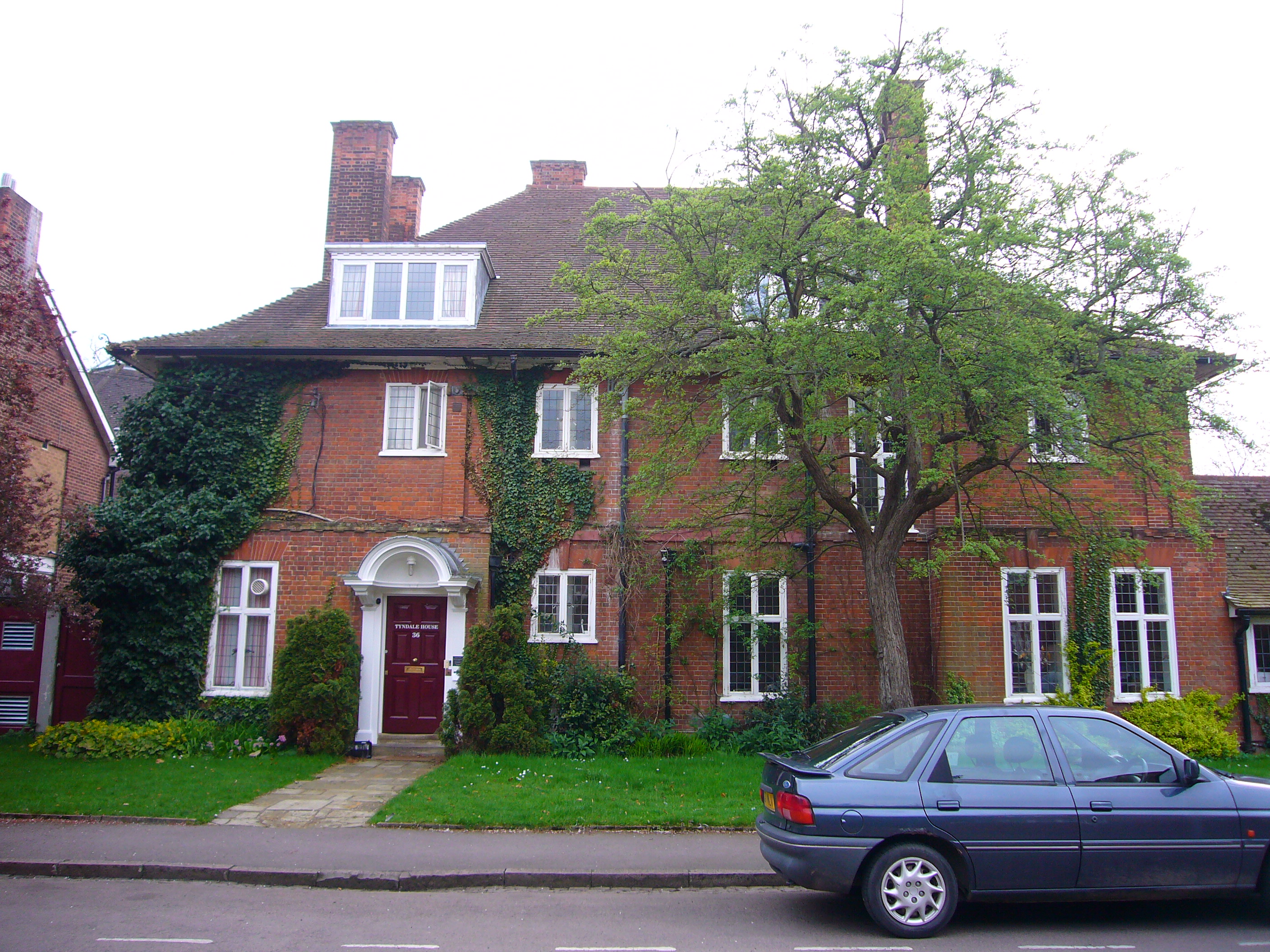
Tyndale House, a theological library, in Selwyn Gardens off the southern end of Grange Road

Grange Road is a street in Cambridge, England. It stretches north–south, meeting Madingley Road (A1303) at a T-junction to the north and Barton Road (A603) to the south. It runs approximately parallel with the River Cam to the east. Grange Road is almost one mile long and has 17th-century origins. It contains several colleges of the University of Cambridge.

== History ==
Several colleges of the University of Cambridge are located alongside Grange Road. The road dates from the 17th century when it was built to allow horse-drawn carriages to navigate the western side of Cambridge. It has been rebuilt many times since. It is located near The Backs and the city centre of Cambridge.

The area has experienced growth and urbanisation in recent years as Selwyn and Newnham Colleges have expanded their main sites.

== University of Cambridge colleges ==
Several of the colleges of the University of Cambridge are located beside Grange Road. Some other colleges have expanded and built student accommodation, study centres, or gardens along Grange Road.

- Selwyn College, facing Sidgwick Avenue
- Newnham College, fronting onto Sidgwick Avenue
- Corpus Christi College Student accommodation at Leckhampton
- Clare Hall, fronting onto Herschel Road
- Robinson College, on Grange Road
- St Catharine's College student accommodation
- St John's College playing fields

The Sidgwick Site nearby is home to several of the university's arts and humanities faculties.

== Theological colleges ==
The Margaret Beaufort Institute of Theology, a Roman Catholic theological college, was located at 12 Grange Road, before the site was bought in 2023 by Queens' College for use as student accommodation. The first house at 12 Grange Road was built in 1890 for Harry Few (1848–1931), and named "Berrycroft"; in 1937, it was renamed as Lady Margaret House after having been purchased by the Congregation of Our Lady, Canonesses of St Augustine.

Tyndale House at 36 Selwyn Gardens, off Grange Road, is a biblical research institute and library.

== King's College School ==
King's College School, associated with King's College, is also located on West Road, just off Grange Road. St John's College School, associated with St John's College, is located on Grange Road.

== Sports clubs ==
The Cambridge University Rugby Union Football Club, also known as CURFUC, is located on Grange Road opposite Selwyn College. It hosts both rugby and American football matches played by the respective university teams. Behind the main pitch the Cambridge University Rugby Union Football Club has a training area which is often used by the local colleges to train for inter-collegiate league matches. The field and centre have undergone redevelopment in recent years to expand and modernise the site so that it can be used by all members of Cambridge University. In addition to serving as a training facility, it has hosted a number of national and international tournaments. The Cambridge University Real Tennis Club is also located here near Burrell's Walk.

== Cambridge University Library ==
The Cambridge University Library is one of the largest legal deposit libraries in the world and was designed by architect Giles Gilbert Scott. The main building, archives, and tower of the Cambridge University Library are all located on Grange Road. The Library is south of Burrell's Walk and north of King's College School.

== See also ==
- Listed buildings in Cambridge (west), with sixteen buildings in Grange Road
