= John Moyer Heathcote =

English barrister and real tennis player

- Born: 12 July 1834; London, U.K.
- Died: 3 August 1912 (aged 78); Conington, Huntingdonshire, U.K.
- Education: Eton College
- Alma mater: Trinity College, Cambridge
- Occupations: Barrister, real tennis player
- Spouse: Louisa Cecilia MacLeod
- Children: 4
- Parent(s): John Heathcote; Emily Colbourne

John Moyer Heathcote (12 July 1834 – 3 August 1912) was an English barrister and real tennis player. He was one of the committee members at the Marylebone Cricket Club responsible for drafting the original rules of lawn tennis and is credited with devising the cloth covering for the tennis ball.

== Early life ==
John Moyer Heathcote was born on 12 July 1834 in Westminster, London. He was the eldest son of John Heathcote of Conington Castle, Huntingdonshire, and his wife the Honourable Emily Colbourne (daughter of Nicholas Colborne, 1st Baron Colborne). He was a descendant of Lord Ancaster of Conington Castle. He was educated at Eton College and was admitted at Trinity College, Cambridge, on 8 October 1851. He was awarded an MA in 1856, but also began playing real tennis at Cambridge.

== Career ==
Heathcote was admitted at Lincoln's Inn on 27 March 1856 and was called to the bar on 17 November 1859. He served on the Northern Circuit.

Heathcote played real tennis regularly at a court in James Street Haymarket from 1856 to 1866. His chief professional teacher and opponent was Edmund Tompkins, for some years champion of tennis. Heathcote became amateur champion in about 1859. At that time, there was no formal competition for the amateur championship, but from 1867 the Marylebone Cricket Club annually offered prizes to its members for play in the courts at Lord's Cricket Ground, and the gold prize carried with it the blue riband of amateur tennis. Heathcote won the gold prize for the next 15 years and in about 1869 he was the equal of any player in the world until the professional George Lambert began to surpass him. Heathcote became involved in lawn tennis which used a vulcanised rubber ball, and he proposed covering the rubber ball with cloth. In 1875, he instigated a meeting at Lords to establish rules for lawn tennis. Walter Clopton Wingfield put forward proposals based on his own game for an hour-glass court and a racquets counting method which were adopted but which led to some objections. By 1877 the All England Lawn Tennis and Croquet Club was proposing the first Wimbledon Tournament, and a review of the rules was required. Heathcote with his fellow MCC commissioner Julian Marshall, and Henry Jones of the All England club laid down the rules that are almost unchanged to this day in time for the first Wimbledon tournament on 9 July 1877. Heathcote was particularly in favour of a return to the rectangular court.

Heathcote became an Honorary Colonel in the 3rd Volunteer Battalion Suffolk Regiment and became Honorary Colonel of the 1st Administrative Battalion of the Cambridge Rifle Volunteers in 1880. He was chairman of the Huntingdonshire Quarter Sessions and was JP and Deputy Lieutenant for Huntingdonshire, and JP for Sussex and the Liberty of Peterborough.

Heathcote was amateur real tennis champion every year until 1882 when the Hon. Alfred Lyttelton ended his long run but in 1883 he regained the title. After this Heathcote only won the gold prize once more in 1886 when Lyttleton was unable to play. Heathcote played tennis for many years and in a number of courts after he retired from competition play.

Heathcote had many interests in sports and games including shooting and skating, he was an amateur artist of some repute and was a graceful writer on sporting subjects. He wrote for the Badminton Library authoring Volume 14: Tennis, Lawn Tennis, Rackets & Fives (1890) with contributions by A. Lyttelton, W. C. Marshall, and others and Volume 18: Skating & Figure Skating (1892), co-authored by Charles Goodman Tebbutt and illustrated with photographs and with wood-engravings by Charles Whympe

== Personal life ==
John Moyer Heathcote married Louisa Cecilia MacLeod (d. 1910), the eldest child and only daughter of Norman MacLeod of MacLeod and his wife Louisa Barbara St John, on 18 December 1860 in St James Westminster. She was born on 24 May 1838 in Marylebone London. They lived at 24 Brunswick Square, Hove, and Conington Castle. They had four children:

- Emily Louisa Heathcote (16 February 1862 – 21 May 1880), buried at Conington.
- John Norman Heathcote (21 June 1863 – 16 July 1946), was a writer about St Kilda, buried at Conington.
- Evelyn May Heathcote ( 17 November 1865 – 15 April 1957).
- Arthur Ridley Heathcote (14 February 1877 – 13 April 1951). He owned the advowson and the right of patronage and presentation to the rectory of Chingford Essex, which he willed to his son John Horace Broke Heathcote. He married Margaret Georgina Broke ( January 1878 – 1 March 1944) on 18 December 1909 in Dunmow Essex, they had three children:
  - John Horace Broke Heathcote (28 December 1910 – 30 May 2003), married Dorelle Geraldine Rice (13 March 1913 – 11 May 2007) on 14 August 1949 in Kensington London. They had two daughters:
    - Miranda Lydia Heathcote (26 January 1950 - 29 June 2003), married George Anthony Guy Belcher (d. 21 August 2013) in 1973.
    - Venetia Catherine Heathcote (b. 22 April 1951), married Sir Nicholas Annesley Marler Thompson, 2nd Baronet (b. 19 March 1947) On 10 December 1982.
  - Norman Richard Heathcote (b. 25 May 1914), married Margaret Enid Burnett (b. 7 January 1920) on 24 August 1946 in Durban, South Africa. They had three children:
    - Richard John Heathcote (b. 17 January 1951)
    - Katherine Louise Heathcote (b. 16 October 1952)
    - Diana Elizabeth Heathcote (b. 16 October 1952)
  - Ila Margaret Heathcote (2 July 1912 – 2 August 1961), married Lt-Col. Walter Dermot Filer Brabazon Muspratt (1 January 1912 – 18 May 1988) on 7 May 1938 in Huntingdon district, they divorced in 1951. They had two daughters:
    - Evelyn Anne Muspratt (b. 1940), married Derek Grundy (b. July 1935) in 1963.
    - Margaret Roberta Muspratt (b. 1946), married John Michael Pitts (b. August 1949) in 1976.

Louisa Heathcote died aged 72 on 20 January 1910 in Conington. John Moyer Heathcote died aged 78 at Conington Castle. Both are buried in All Saints churchyard Conington, Huntingdonshire.

A wall tablet in the south transept of Conington church is inscribed: "Louisa Cecilia only daughter of Norman Macleod of Isle of Skye and beloved wife of John Moyer Heathcote Esq. She died Jan 1910 in the 50th year of her happy married life aged 77 years. Lord what wait I for? My hope is in thee."

A grave and memorial in the churchyard at east end of church is inscribed: "John Moyer Heathcote / born July 12th 1834 / died August 3rd 1912 : Louisa Cecilia Heathcote / born May 19th 1838 / married December 18th 1860 / died January 20th 1910." A wall tablet with classical surround in the south transept of Conington church: "In memory of John Moyer Heathcote eldest son of John Moyer Heathcote of Conington Castle. Married in 1860 Louisa Cecilia daughter of Norman, Macleod of Macleod. Died Aug 1912 aged 78 years."

Arthur Ridley Heathcote and his wife Margaret Georgina lived in Switzerland from 1928, they both died in Montreux Switzerland.

Grave in churchyard All Saints Conington, headstone inscription: "John Horace / Heathcote / 28th December 1910 / 30th May 2003." A further monument is inscribed: "In loving memory / of / Dorelle Geraldine / Heathcote / wife of / John Horace Heathcote / Born 13th March 1913 / Died 11th May 2007 / together again."
