= Cambridge University Real Tennis Club =

Real tennis club in Cambridge, UK

Coordinates: 52.2053°N 0.1063°E

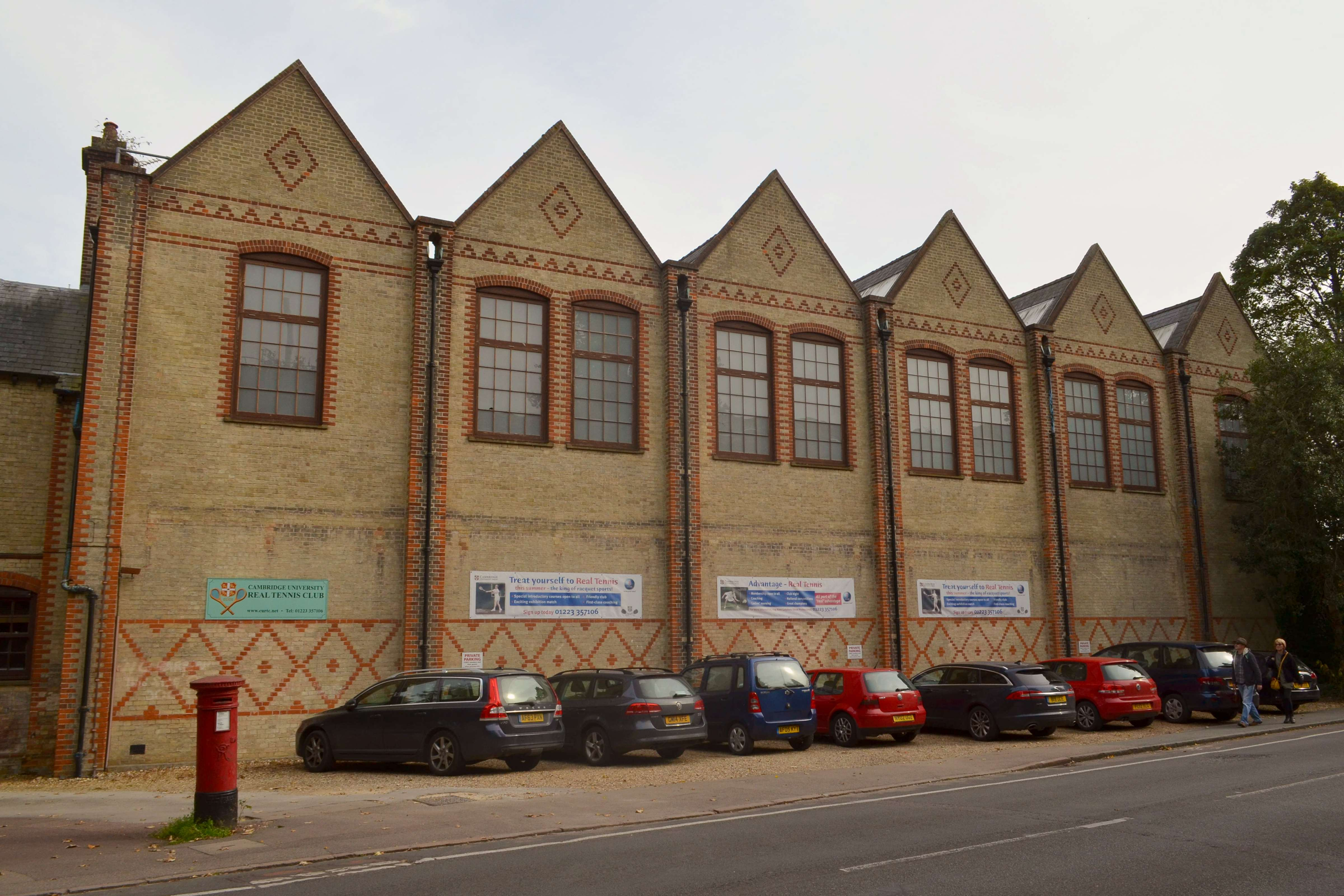
Cambridge Real Tennis Club building viewed from Robinson College

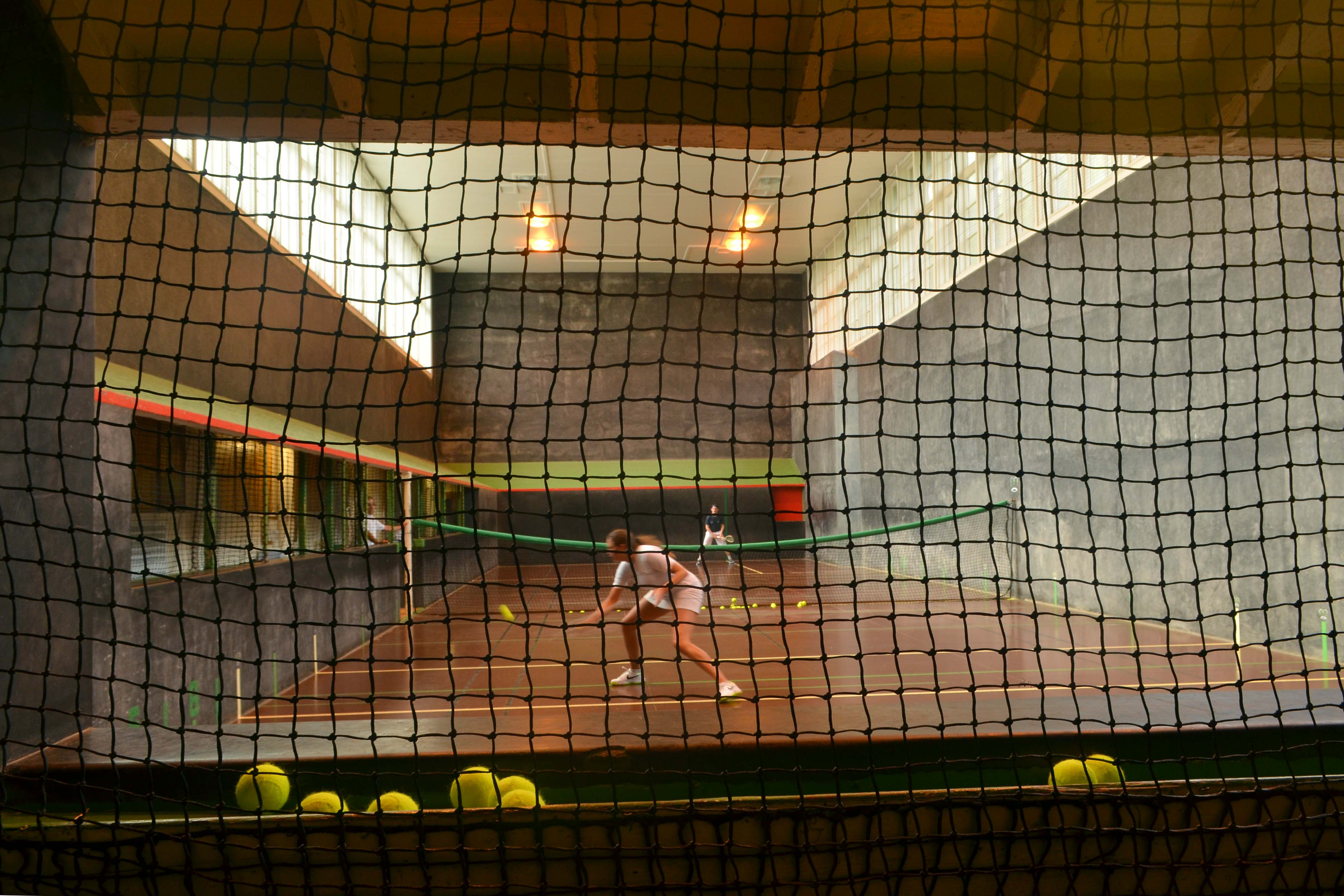
The Green Court in September 2017

The Cambridge University Real Tennis Club is located on Grange Road, Cambridge, England. The club runs under the auspices of the University of Cambridge. It is one of the few real tennis clubs and courts in the United Kingdom.

== History ==
In 1866, a real tennis court was built at the western end of Burrell's Walk, close to Grange Road, on land leased from Clare College. Funding was raised by private subscription from several fellows of Clare and Trinity College, for the use of senior and junior members at these colleges. In 1877, use of the court was extended to King's College. A second court was erected at the same site in 1890, converted into four squash courts in 1933, but reopened for real tennis in 1999. In 1902, use of the facilities was extended to any member of Cambridge University.

In 1958, associate membership was introduced for real tennis players who were not members of the university. The name of the court changed from Clare and Trinity Tennis Courts to Cambridge Tennis and Squash Rackets Courts. The courts were managed by a committee. After World War II, the Cambridge University Tennis Club was formed. By around 1959, it had become known as the Real Tennis Club.

In 1974, the freehold of the site was acquired from Clare College by the university. The building was listed at grade II in 2014.

== See also ==
- Listed buildings in Cambridge (west)
