= Frederick Oliver =

English cricketer

Frederick William Oliver (4 January 1836 – 7 July 1899) was an English first-class cricketer active 1855–57 who played for Surrey. He was born in Mayfair and died in Earl's Court. He played in ten first-class matches.
