= Wimbledon Lawn Tennis Museum =

Museum in England

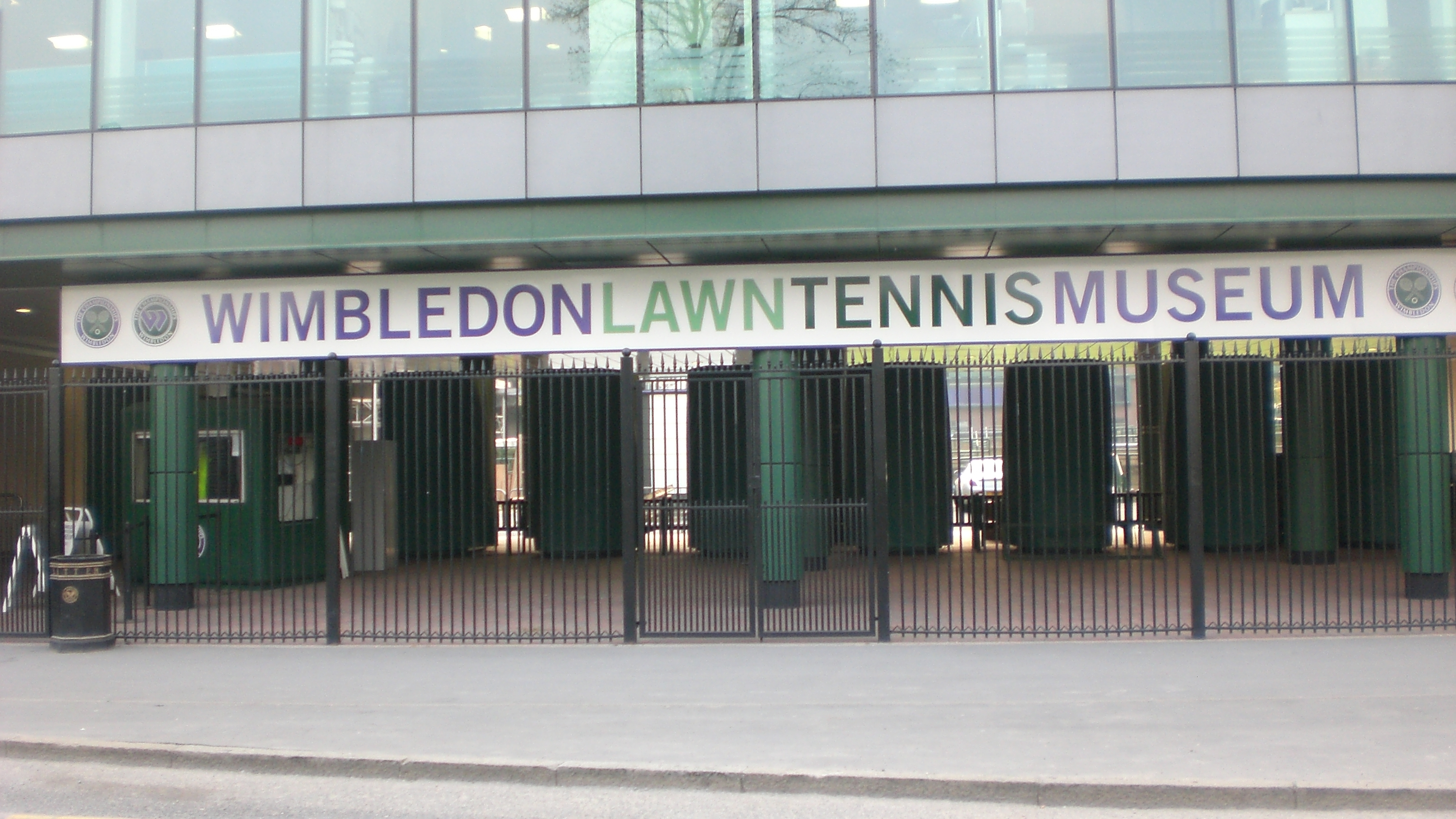
- Wimbledon Lawn Tennis Museum
- Established: 1977
- Location: All England Lawn Tennis Club; London, SW19; United Kingdom
- Coordinates: 51°26′5″N 0°12′48″W
- Public transit access: Wimbledon; Southfields
- Website: Museum website

Wimbledon Lawn Tennis Museum (WLTM) is the largest tennis museum in the world. The museum was inaugurated at The Championships centenary event in 1977. On 12 April 2006, The Duke of Kent declared the brand new Wimbledon Lawn Tennis Museum open to the public inside the grounds of the All England Lawn Tennis Club.

This museum has exhibits and artefacts dating back to 1555 as well as touch screen computer consoles for visitors to interact with. Memorabilia from many famous players from Victorian times up to present day are included in exhibits which change seasonally. The museum allows Museum guests to experience the atmosphere of Centre Court, except for the period around The Championships. Guided tours led by Blue Badge guides are also available which take visitors behind the scenes of the All England Lawn Tennis Club. Audio guides are also available. WLTM is open year-round to the public except during The Championships week where entry is available to tournament ticket holders only.

== Notable exhibits ==
- VR Experience: Takes visitors on journey through the history of The Championships at Wimbledon, the science behind its grass, special moments in its history, and 360˚ footage of The Championships, 2016.
- John McEnroe's Ghost: Tour through normally off-limits areas led by projection of John McEnroe.
- The Whites of Wimbledon: Collection of past and present fashions of Wimbledon attire.

== The Kenneth Ritchie Wimbledon Library ==
The Kenneth Ritchie Wimbledon Library is home to a collection of books, periodicals, videos, and DVDs relating to tennis. It is the largest tennis library in the world.

== Bibliography ==
- Warren, Valerie (1982) The Wimbledon Lawn Tennis Museum. Wimbledon: The Museum ISBN 0-906741-09-2
- Wimbledon Lawn Tennis Museum (1977) Fernedge Printers, printed by, [1977?]
- Briggs, Susan (2009) "Wandering Around Wimbledon".
