= Spencer Gore (sportsman) =

British tennis player

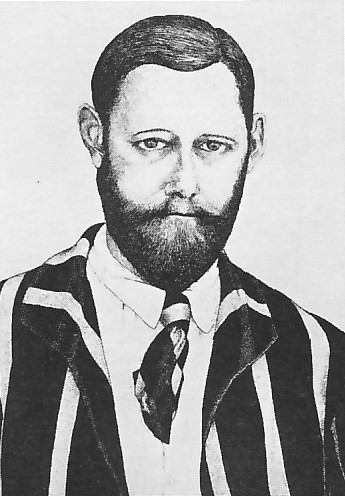
- Spencer Gore
- Full name: Spencer William Gore
- Country (sports): United Kingdom of Great Britain and Ireland
- Born: 10 March 1850 Wimbledon, Surrey, England
- Died: 19 April 1906 (aged 56) Ramsgate, Kent, England

Singles

Grand Slam singles results
- Wimbledon: W (1877)

Spencer William Gore (10 March 1850 – 19 April 1906) was an English tennis player who won the first Wimbledon tournament in 1877 and a first-class cricketer who played for Surrey County Cricket Club (1874–1875).

== Early years ==
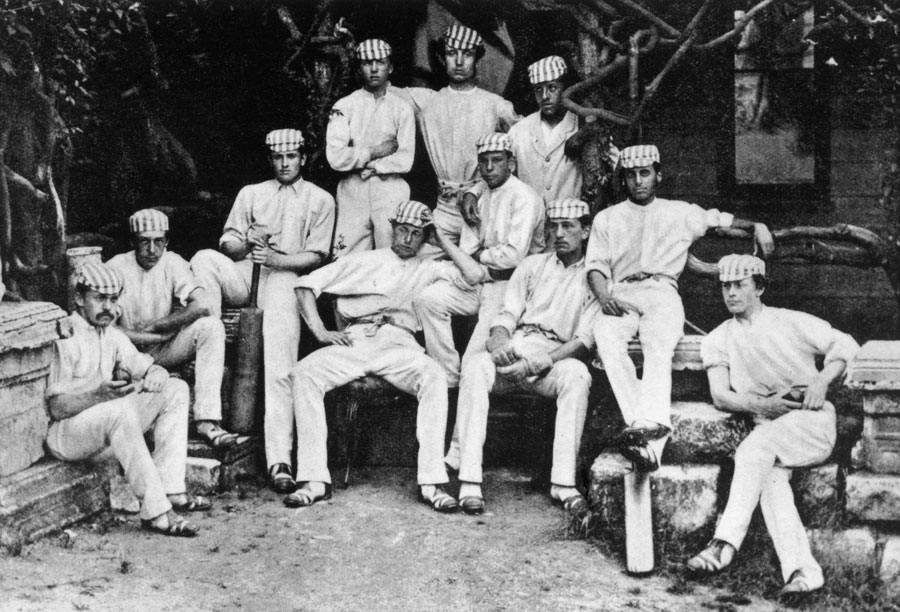
Harrow cricket team of 1869 for the match against Eton. Gore is front row, fourth from the left.

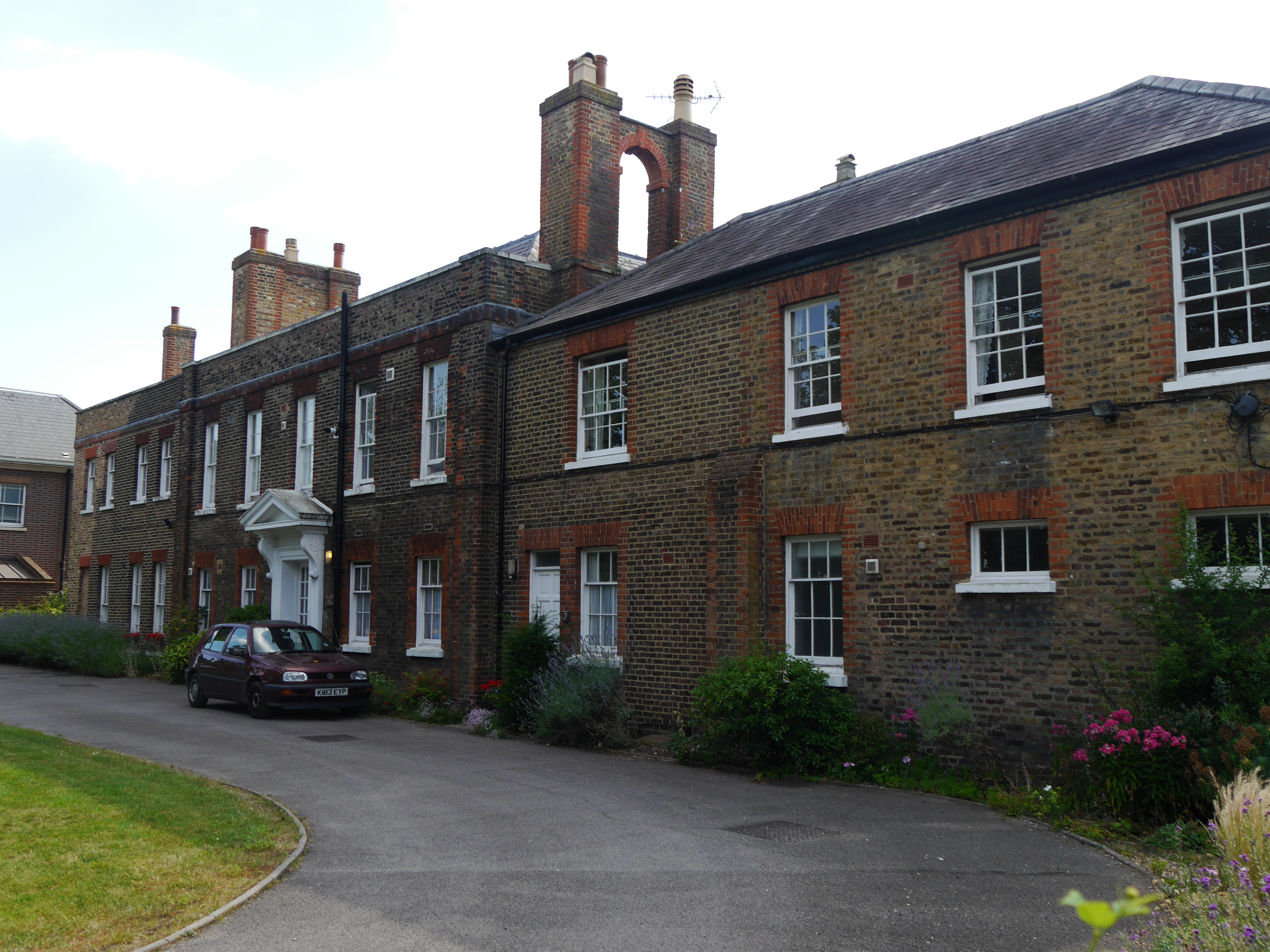
West Side House, Wimbledon, where Gore was born and raised

Spencer William Gore was the son of the Hon. Charles Alexander Gore, grandson of the second Earl of Arran, and Lady Augusta Lavinia Priscilla (née Ponsonby), a daughter of the fourth Earl of Bessborough. His mother's first marriage was to William Petty-FitzMaurice, Earl of Kerry, who died in 1836. His father was the Commissioner of Woods and Forests. His two brothers were the theologian Charles Gore, the first Bishop of Birmingham, and Sir Francis Charles Gore, Solicitor to the Board of Inland Revenue.

Spencer was born and raised within a mile of the All England Croquet Club at West Side House, Wimbledon Common, Surrey. He was educated at Harrow School, where he excelled at all games, especially football and cricket, and was the captain of the school cricket team in 1869.

== Sporting career ==
Gore made his first-class cricket debut for Surrey against Middlesex in 1874 hitting 17 runs off the first four balls he received in his first match. He played again for Surrey against Middlesex in 1875 when Surrey won by 10 wickets and he did not have a chance to play a second innings. He played cricket mainly for I Zingari at club level, playing his last match for them in 1893. He played two first-class matches for I Zingari which were against Yorkshire in 1878 and 1879 and one match for Gentlemen of the South in 1879.

In 1877 the first Wimbledon lawn tennis championship was held at the All England Lawn Tennis and Croquet Club which had been renamed from the All England Croquet Club when tennis had been added there two years earlier. Gore won the Gentleman's Singles beating William Marshall 6–1, 6–2, 6–4 on 19 July 1877. He was the first player who ever used the technique of volleying, therefore he is considered the creator of the style of volley.

Gore was among the twenty-two men who paid a guinea to enter the inaugural 1877 championship (women did not have a competition until 1884). The 21 matches were spread over five days. The championship was suspended for the weekend so as not to clash with the annual Eton v Harrow cricket match at Lord's Cricket Ground. The scheduled final on Monday was postponed for four days because of rain.

Dropping only two sets in four rounds, the 27-year-old Gore reached the final after beating CG Heathcote in the semifinal. Against Marshall, he won in straight sets, 6–1, 6–2, 6–4, in forty eight minutes. Gore collected the first prize of 12 guineas and a silver cup presented by The Field, a sporting magazine.

As the reigning champion Gore did not have to play through the tournament in the following year's Championship but instead played in the challenge round against the winner of the All-Comers tournament. He lost the Gentleman's Singles challenge round to Frank Hadow 7–5, 6–1, 9–7 and did not compete in the Wimbledon Championships again after that match.

== Business career ==
Gore joined Pickering and Smith, the property advisory firm of his father-in-law Edmund James Smith who became president of the Surveyors' Institute. Gore was promoted to partnership and the firm was renamed Smiths and Gore.

== Personal life ==
On 9 January 1875, Gore married Amy Margaret Smith, with whom he had four children—Kathleen Amy, Florence Emily Frances, George Pym (1875–1959) and Spencer Frederick (1878–1914). The last became well known as the artist Spencer Gore while George was a boxing champion and played cricket for Durham.

Gore died on 19 April 1906 at the Granville Hotel, Ramsgate, Kent, aged 56, apparently from natural causes. He was buried in Ramsgate Cemetery on 23 April 1906 (grave number AA511).

== Grand Slam tournaments ==
=== Singles: 2 (1 title, 1 runner-up) ===
Result	Date	Tournament	Surface	Opponent	Score
Win	1877	Wimbledon	Grass	(United Kingdom) William Marshall	6–1, 6–2, 6–4
Loss	1878	Wimbledon	Grass	(United Kingdom) Frank Hadow	5–7, 1–6, 7–9
