= Conington Castle =

16th-century house in Huntingdonshire, England

Coordinates: 52.4565°N 0.264841°W

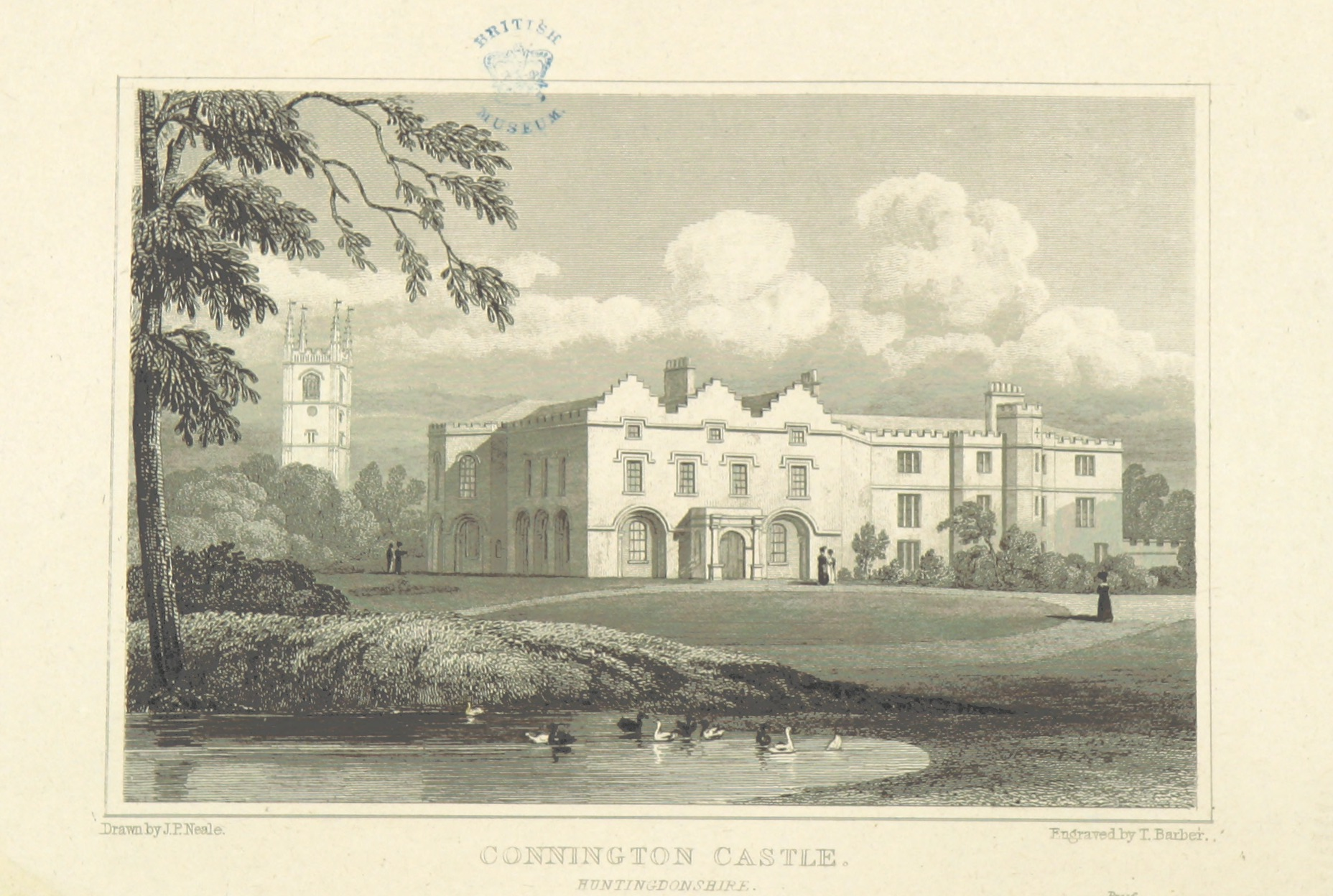
Connington Castle drawn in 1818.

Conington Castle was a 16th-century house in Conington, Huntingdonshire, England, built for Sir Robert Cotton. It was demolished in 1956 by the then owner John Horace Broke Heathcote.

== History ==
Sir John Cotton (1662–1702) never lived in the house and it fell into ruin. His grandson, Sir John Cotton (1702–1731), pulled down part of it, and converted the rest into a farmhouse. The politician John Heathcote (1767–1838) restored and improved the house. His eldest son, John Moyer Heathcote, made substantial alterations in 1840.

In 1941 John Norman Heathcote placed the castle at the disposal of the British Red Cross for use as a convalescent hospital. The buildings were modified and opened in October 1941 with accommodation for 80 patients. Mr Heathcote moved from the castle to the Home Farm.

In 1955 Conington Castle was put on the property market by John Horace Broke Heathcote. It was noted that it was 'suitable for conversion or institutional use'. Accommodation comprised 3 reception rooms, 5 bedrooms, 2 dressing rooms, and 3 bathrooms. There was also 14 secondary bedrooms and 3 bathrooms; stabling; a cottage; garages; walled gardens; and 35 acres of parkland.

In November 1955 Huntingdonshire County Council received a notice of the intention to demolish Conington Castle. The planning committee wished to preserve the castle but would therefore have to make a building preservation order, the effect of this would be for the Council to purchase the property, which was not possible. The Advisory Committee of the Ministry of Housing and Local Government were of the opinion that the building was not of exceptional national interest. Two wings of the castle, a stable block and butlers accommodation, were converted in 1955 to a family home thereafter called Conington House. The Heathcote family owned the property until 2008.

Connington House was owned by the Wardens and Assistants of Rochester Bridge between 2008 and 2012. The house is now owned privately.
