= William Collyer (Surrey cricketer) =

English lawyer and cricketer

William James Collyer (1 June 1841 – 1 September 1908) was an English cricketer who captained Surrey County Cricket Club in 1867.

Collyer was born at Halebourne near Chobham in Surrey in 1841, the eldest son of Richard Collyer. He was a right-handed batsman who made 18 first-class appearances for Surrey between 1866 and 1869, scoring a total of 386 runs. His highest score, and only score of over 50, was 69. He never bowled in a first-class match. He captained Surrey in 1867. He is known also to have played for his university college and for a variety of teams, mainly in the Surrey area, between 1859 and 1874.

Collyer was educated at Windlesham School and Exeter College, Oxford. He graduated with a law degree in 1863 and was admitted to Lincoln's Inn before gaining an MA in 1865. He died at Bruges in Belgium in 1908 aged 67.
