= William Marshall (tennis) =

English architect and tennis player

- Full name: William Cecil Marshall
- Country (sports): United Kingdom of Great Britain and Ireland
- Born: 29 April 1849 Mayfair, Middlesex, England
- Died: 24 January 1921 (aged 71) Hindhead, Surrey, England

Grand Slam singles results
- Wimbledon: F (1877)

William Cecil Marshall (29 April 1849 – 24 January 1921) was a British architect and amateur tennis player, who was runner-up in the very first Wimbledon tournament to Spencer Gore in 1877. Marshall designed private houses and university buildings in Cambridge, a university building in Dublin, and tennis courts in Cambridge and London, and extended Down House for his friend Charles Darwin. He was an original member of the Art Workers' Guild.

== Early life and education ==
William Cecil Marshall was raised in the Lake District, where his father, Henry Cowper (or Cooper) Marshall, owned Derwent Island House on Derwent Water; he had previously served as Mayor of Leeds (1842–43). His paternal grandfather, John Marshall, was a wealthy Leeds industrialist who had moved to the Lake District on his retirement. His mother was Catherine née Spring Rice, the daughter of Thomas Spring Rice, 1st Baron Monteagle of Brandon.

Marshall attended Rugby School and then Trinity College, Cambridge, where he played lawn tennis for the university against Oxford in 1870, 1871 and 1872.

== Architectural career ==
Marshall first worked for the Cheltenham architect, John Middleton (1873), and subsequently for Basil Champneys and Thomas Graham Jackson. In 1876 he established his own architectural practice at Queen Square, London. An early commission was an extension of Charles Darwin's Down House, then in Kent (1876).

Marshall's architectural designs include several university buildings in Cambridge on the New Museums and Downing science sites: the original Engineering Department (1894 and 1900) and the Old Examination Hall (1909) on the New Museums Site, and the neo-1680 Botany School (1904) and the Forestry (later Geography) building (1914) on the Downing Site. He also designed the Botany Building of Trinity College, Dublin.

His private houses in Cambridge include the Elizabethan-style Leckhampton House, off Grange Road, for the academic and spiritualist F. W. H. Myers (1881), the grade-II-listed Tudor Revival house Elterholm on Madingley Road for the historian, Thomas Thornley (1888), and possibly Wychfield on Huntingdon Road, now part of Trinity Hall. Elsewhere, commissions on private houses include a substantial extension to, and remodelling in Neo-Jacobean style of, a house called Borden Wood in the hamlet of Borden, in the West Sussex village of Milland; it is grade II listed. Marshall designed this in 1887, the same year in which he designed and built Tweenways in nearby Hindhead. This was a "modest weekend house" for himself, with a triple-gabled façade. It is now the Hindhead Music Centre.

In the Lake District, he worked on the church of St John the Evangelist in Keswick, which had been founded by his grandfather, extending the chancel in 1889. He was probably also responsible for alterations to St Peter's Church in Castle Carrock at around the same time, which "Normanised" the building. He may also be responsible for 1882 alterations to Monk Coniston Hall in Coniston, attributed to "William Cecil Marshall of Leeds".

One of his specialisms was tennis courts; these include a clubhouse and real tennis court for the Clare and Trinity Tennis Courts in Cambridge (1890), now part of a grade-II-listed building, as well as courts at the Queen's Club in London.

He was an original member of the Art Workers' Guild.

== Tennis ==
Marshall was a defensive player who was no match for the aggressive Gore in the final, the Wimbledon local winning 6–1, 6–2, 6–4 in 48 minutes. There was a formally dressed crowd of about 200 who paid a shilling each to stand and watch; there were no stands. A field of 22 competitors assembled to play and had to finish by Thursday because an important cricket match was scheduled for Friday.

He also reached the third round in the 1879 tournament where he was defeated by eventual champion John Hartley.

== Personal life ==
He married Margaret Anna Lloyd, the daughter of the New Zealander J. F. Lloyd, an archdeacon; the couple had six children, three sons and three daughters. Margaret Marshall was a noted suffragist. The family lived in Bedford Square in Bloomsbury, until Marshall's retirement in 1908, when they moved to Tweenways (now Leigh Heights), a house he had built near Hindhead in Surrey in the 1880s. One of his daughters, Frances Partridge, was a diarist connected with the Bloomsbury Group. Another daughter, Rachel Alice "Ray" Garnett (1891–1940), was an illustrator and author of children's literature; she married the author David Garnett. One of his sons was the sociologist Thomas Humphrey Marshall.

Marshall was an amateur artist and naturalist; in addition to tennis, he was a keen ice skater, and wrote a book on the topic. He was a friend and correspondent of Charles Darwin; his circle also included Leslie Stephen, John Ruskin and Alfred, Lord Tennyson. Frances Partridge describes the family during her childhood as standing for "love of Nature ... for Wordsworthian poetry and its pantheistic outlook; for eugenics, agnosticism, and the march of science; for class distinctions courteously observed." T. H. Marshall characterises the household as "intellectually and artistically cultured and financially well-endowed."

W. C. Marshall died at home in Hindhead on 24 January 1921.

== Grand Slam finals ==
=== Singles: 1 (1 runner-up) ===
Result	Date	Tournament	Surface	Opponent	Score
Loss	1877	Wimbledon	Grass	(United Kingdom) Spencer Gore	1–6, 2–6, 4–6
