= List of Wimbledon gentlemen's singles champions =

Wimbledon Men's Singles Champions
- Location: London; United Kingdom
- Venue: AELTC
- Governing body: AELTC
- Created: 1877
- Editions: 138 Grand Slam events (2025); 57 events (Open Era)
- Surface: Grass (since 1877)
- Prize money: £3,600,000 (2026)
- Trophy: Gentleman's Singles Trophy
- Website: wimbledon.com

Most titles
- Amateur era: 7: William Renshaw (challenge round)
- Open era: 8: Roger Federer

Most consecutive titles
- Amateur era: 6: William Renshaw (challenge round)
- Open era: 5: Björn Borg; 5: Roger Federer

Current champion
- Jannik Sinner; 2nd Title

Wimbledon Championships is an annual British tennis tournament created in 1877 and played on outdoor grass courts (Note: Since 2009, Centre Court features a retractable roof, allowing indoor and night-time play.) (Note: Wimbledon entered the Open Era with the 1968 edition, allowing professional players to compete alongside amateurs.) at the All England Lawn Tennis and Croquet Club (AELTC) in the Wimbledon suburb of London, United Kingdom. The Gentlemen's Singles was the first event contested in 1877.

== History ==
The Wimbledon Championships are played in the first two weeks of July (as of July 2017; prior to this, they were played in the last week of June and first week of July) and have chronologically been the third of the four Grand Slam tournaments of the tennis season since 1987. The event was not held from 1915 to 1918 because of World War I and again from 1940 to 1945 because of World War II. It was also cancelled in 2020 due to the COVID-19 pandemic.

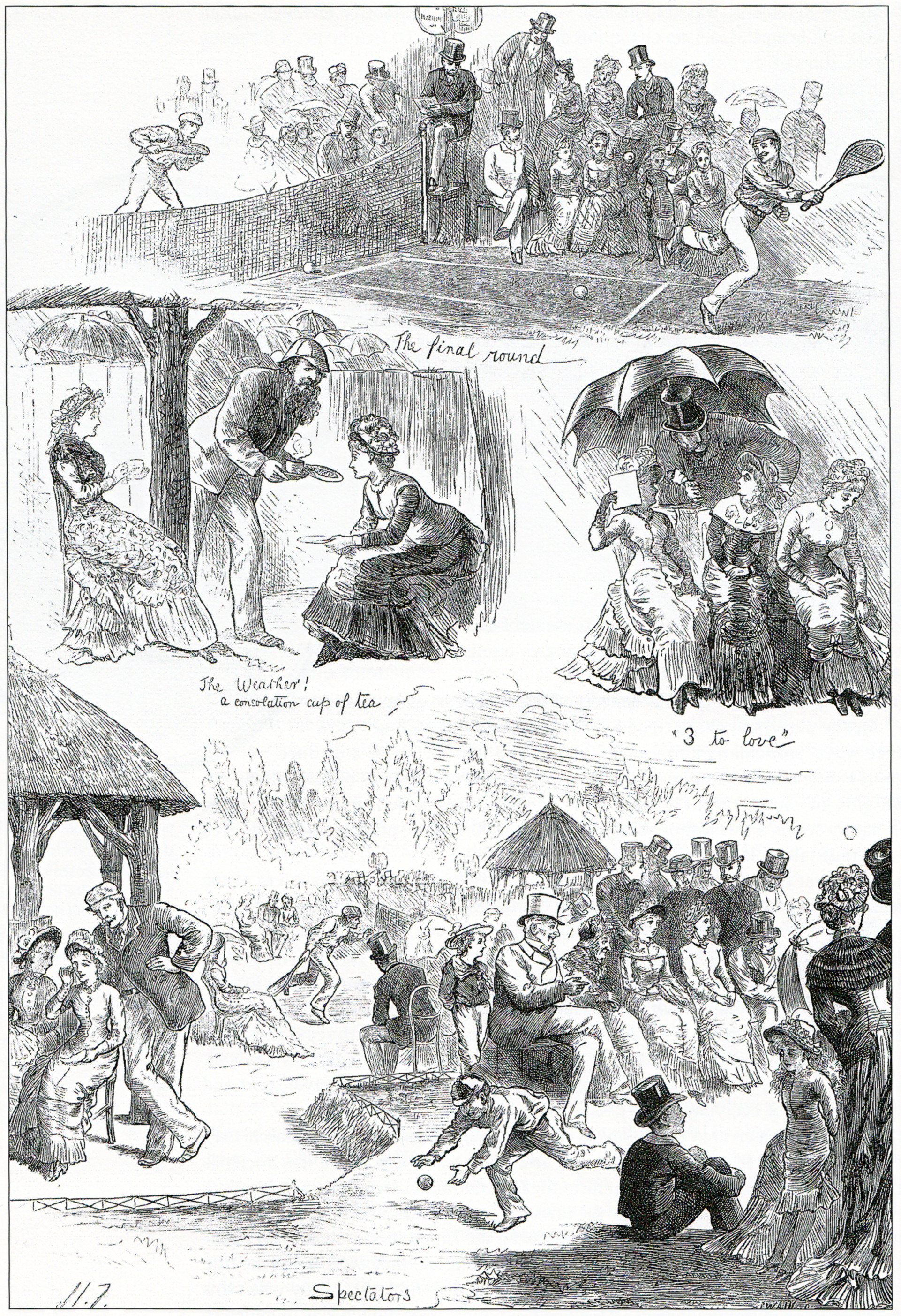
Wimbledon Lawn tennis final, 15 July 1879.

The Gentlemen's Singles' rules have undergone several changes since the first edition. From 1878 until 1921, the event started with a knockout phase, the All Comers' Singles, whose winner then faced the defending champion in a challenge round. The All Comers' winner was automatically awarded the title six times (1879, 1887, 1891, 1895, 1907, 1908) in the absence of the previous year's champion. The challenge round system was abolished with the 1922 edition. Since the first championships, all matches have been played at the best-of-five sets. Between 1877 and 1883, the winner of the next game at five games all took the set in every match except the All Comers' final, and the challenge round, which were won with six games and a two games advantage. All sets were decided in this advantage format from 1884 to 1970. The best-of-12-points lingering death tie-break was introduced in 1971 for the first four sets, played at eight games all until 1978 and at six games all since 1979.

Since 1949, the Gentlemen's Singles champion has received a miniature replica of the event's trophy, a silver-gilt cup created in 1887 with the engraved inscription: "The All England Lawn Tennis Club Single Handed Champion of the World". New singles champions are traditionally elected honorary members of the AELTC by the club's committee. (Note: John McEnroe is the only player to have been denied membership in 1981, because of his on-court behaviour during the championships.) In 2017, the Gentlemen's Singles winner received prize money of £2,220,000.

In the Amateur Era, William Renshaw (1881–1886, 1889) holds the record for the most titles in the Gentlemen's Singles, winning Wimbledon seven times. Renshaw's wins, however, came within the challenge round format, and he won the event only twice after going through a complete draw. Renshaw also holds the record for most consecutive titles with six (from 1881 to 1886). The record for most consecutive and most wins post challenge round during the Amateur Era is Fred Perry with three (1934–1936). Rod Laver remains one of the most successful men to ever pick up a tennis racquet and having been runner-up in 1959 and 1960 he became Champion in 1961 and 1962 and was unable to compete from 1963-1967 inclusive as he had become a professional and only amateurs were allowed to compete before it was opened up in 1968. Laver won it again that year and 1969 also and twice completed all 4 Grand Slams in the same season (1962/1969).

In the Open Era, since the inclusion of professional tennis players in 1968, Roger Federer (2003–2007, 2009, 2012, 2017) holds the record for the most Gentlemen's Singles titles with eight. Björn Borg (1976–1980) and Roger Federer (2003–2007) share the record for most consecutive victories with five.

Federer reached 7 consecutive Wimbledon Finals (2003 – 09), an all-time record, surpassing the old record of 6 consecutive finals by Borg (1976–81) and in the process the Swede won 41 consecutive matches at Wimbledon.

This event was won without losing a single set in the entire tournament during the Open Era twice, in 1976 by Björn Borg and in 2017 by Roger Federer.

Roger Federer is the only player in history, in both the Amateur and Open Eras, to reach the Wimbledon Gentlemen's Singles Final twelve times.

From 1993 to 2000, Pete Sampras reached the Wimbledon final 7 times out of 8 years, winning all 7 finals in which he competed. During that period, the only time he did not reach the final was in 1996, where he lost at the quarter final stage to eventual champion Richard Krajicek.

== Champions ==
=== Amateur Era ===
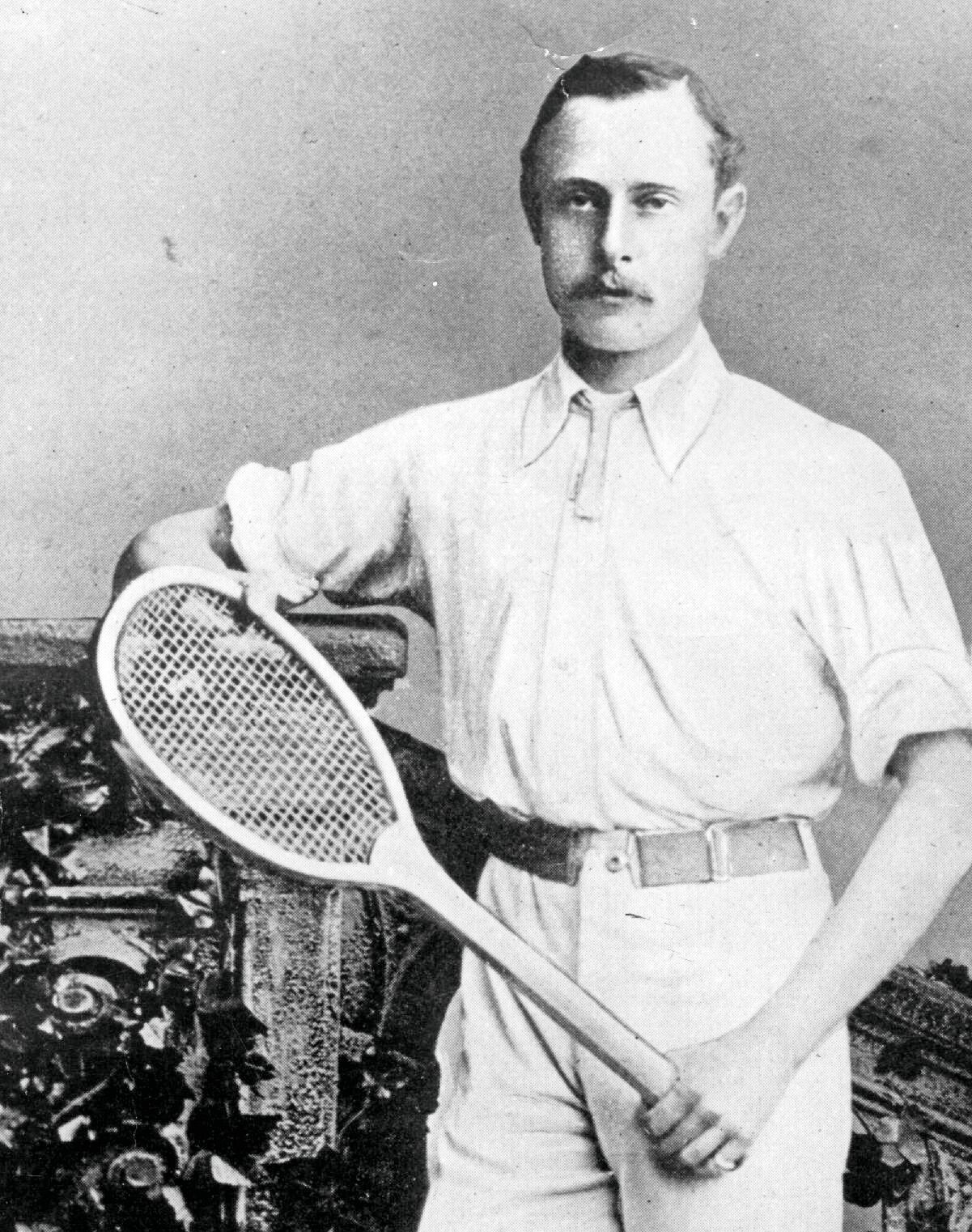
William Renshaw was the first man to win seven championships.

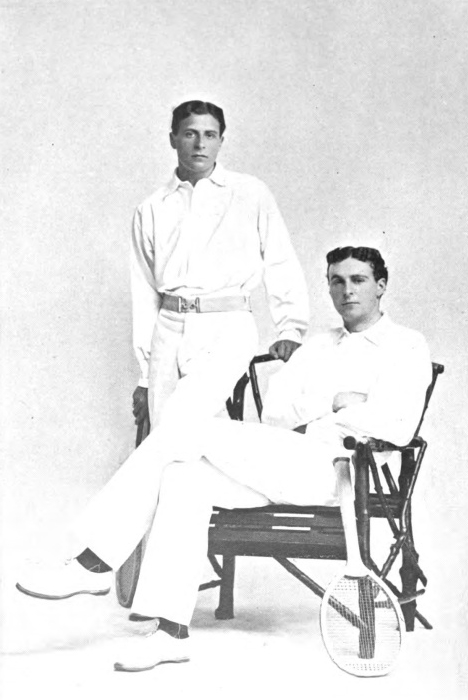
Reginald Doherty won Wimbledon four times and his brother Laurence won it five times.

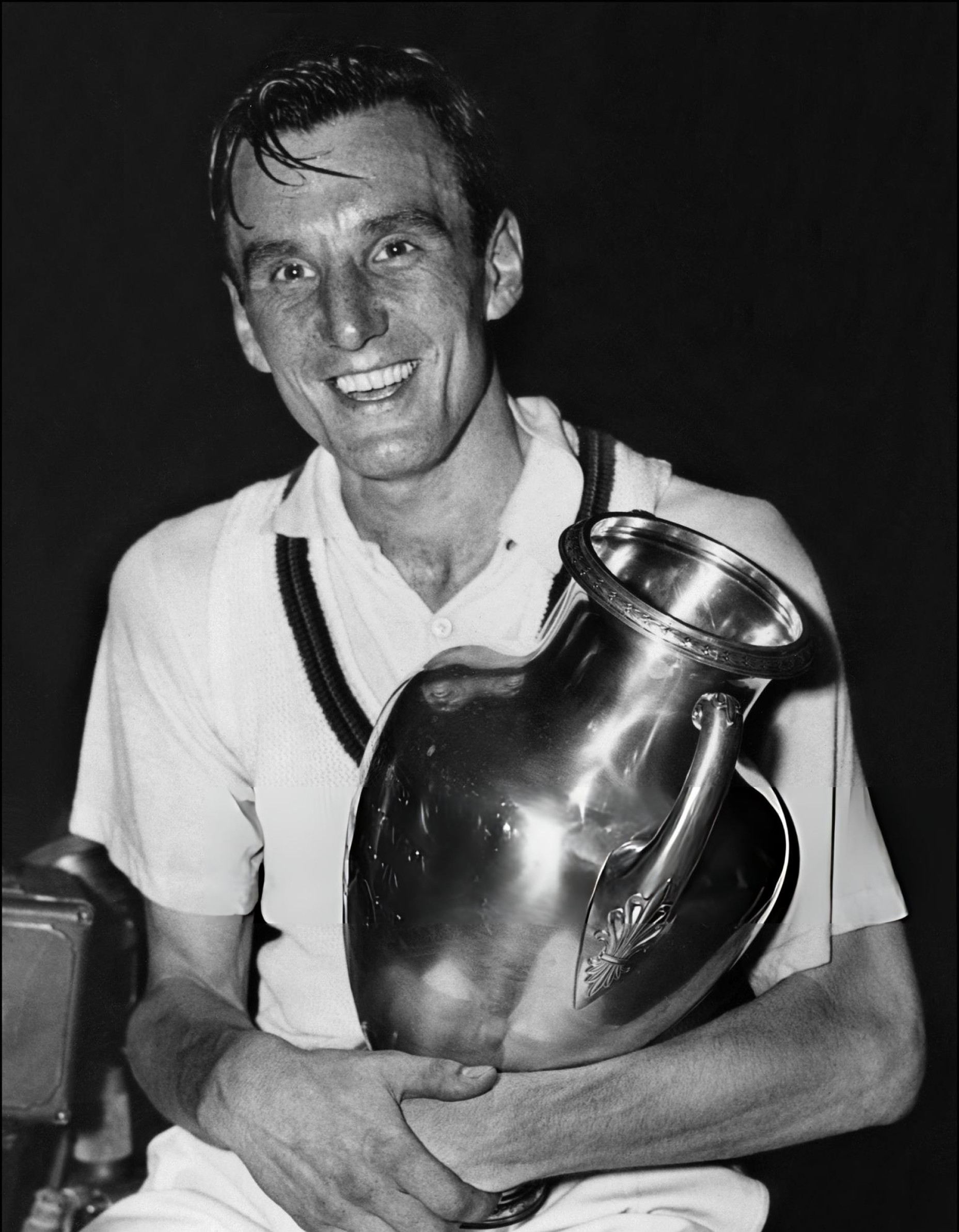
Fred Perry won three consecutive championships and was the last British man to win Wimbledon (1936) until Andy Murray's win 77 years later in 2013.

Key
All Comers' winner, Challenge round winner ‡
Defending champion, Challenge round winner †
All Comers' winner, no Challenge round ◊

Year	Country	Champion	Country	Runner-up	Score in the final
1877	BRI (Note: "British Isles" (BRI) is used for players from the United Kingdom of Great Britain and Ireland (1801–1922), distinct from "Great Britain" (GBR) used for players from the United Kingdom (1922–present).)	Spencer Gore	BRI	William Marshall	6–1, 6–2, 6–4
1878	BRI	Frank Hadow ‡	BRI	Spencer Gore	7–5, 6–1, 9–7
1879	BRI	John Hartley (1/2) ◊	BRI	Vere St. Leger Goold	6–2, 6–4, 6–2
1880	BRI	John Hartley (2/2) †	BRI	Herbert Lawford	6–3, 6–2, 2–6, 6–3
1881	BRI	William Renshaw (1/7) ‡	BRI	John Hartley	6–0, 6–1, 6–1
1882	BRI	William Renshaw (2/7) †	BRI	Ernest Renshaw	6–1, 2–6, 4–6, 6–2, 6–2
1883	BRI	William Renshaw (3/7) †	BRI	Ernest Renshaw	2–6, 6–3, 6–3, 4–6, 6–3
1884	BRI	William Renshaw (4/7) †	BRI	Herbert Lawford	6–0, 6–4, 9–7
1885	BRI	William Renshaw (5/7) †	BRI	Herbert Lawford	7–5, 6–2, 4–6, 7–5
1886	BRI	William Renshaw (6/7) †	BRI	Herbert Lawford	6–0, 5–7, 6–3, 6–4
1887	BRI	Herbert Lawford ◊	BRI	Ernest Renshaw	1–6, 6–3, 3–6, 6–4, 6–4
1888	BRI	Ernest Renshaw ‡	BRI	Herbert Lawford	6–3, 7–5, 6–0
1889	BRI	William Renshaw (7/7) ‡	BRI	Ernest Renshaw	6–4, 6–1, 3–6, 6–0
1890	BRI	Willoughby Hamilton ‡	BRI	William Renshaw	6–8, 6–2, 3–6, 6–1, 6–1
1891	BRI	Wilfred Baddeley (1/3) ◊	BRI	Joshua Pim	6–4, 1–6, 7–5, 6–0
1892	BRI	Wilfred Baddeley (2/3) †	BRI	Joshua Pim	4–6, 6–3, 6–3, 6–2
1893	BRI	Joshua Pim (1/2) ‡	BRI	Wilfred Baddeley	3–6, 6–1, 6–3, 6–2
1894	BRI	Joshua Pim (2/2) †	BRI	Wilfred Baddeley	10–8, 6–2, 8–6
1895	BRI	Wilfred Baddeley (3/3) ◊	BRI	Wilberforce Eaves	4–6, 2–6, 8–6, 6–2, 6–3
1896	BRI	Harold Mahony ‡	BRI	Wilfred Baddeley	6–2, 6–8, 5–7, 8–6, 6–3
1897	BRI	Reginald Doherty (1/4) ‡	BRI	Harold Mahony	6–4, 6–4, 6–3
1898	BRI	Reginald Doherty (2/4) †	BRI	Laurence Doherty	6–3, 6–3, 2–6, 5–7, 6–1
1899	BRI	Reginald Doherty (3/4) †	BRI	Arthur Gore	1–6, 4–6, 6–3, 6–3, 6–3
1900	BRI	Reginald Doherty (4/4) †	BRI	Sydney Smith	6–8, 6–3, 6–1, 6–2
1901	BRI	Arthur Gore (1/3) ‡	BRI	Reginald Doherty	4–6, 7–5, 6–4, 6–4
1902	BRI	Laurence Doherty (1/5) ‡	BRI	Arthur Gore	6–4, 6–3, 3–6, 6–0
1903	BRI	Laurence Doherty (2/5) †	BRI	Frank Riseley	7–5, 6–3, 6–0
1904	BRI	Laurence Doherty (3/5) †	BRI	Frank Riseley	6–1, 7–5, 8–6
1905	BRI	Laurence Doherty (4/5) †	AUS	Norman Brookes	8–6, 6–2, 6–4
1906	BRI	Laurence Doherty (5/5) †	BRI	Frank Riseley	6–4, 4–6, 6–2, 6–3
1907	AUS	Norman Brookes (1/2) ◊	BRI	Arthur Gore	6–4, 6–2, 6–2
1908	BRI	Arthur Gore (2/3) ◊	BRI	Herbert Roper Barrett	6–3, 6–2, 4–6, 3–6, 6–4
1909	BRI	Arthur Gore (3/3) †	BRI	Major Ritchie	6–8, 1–6, 6–2, 6–2, 6–2
1910	NZL	Anthony Wilding (1/4) ‡	BRI	Arthur Gore	6–4, 7–5, 4–6, 6–2
1911	NZL	Anthony Wilding (2/4) †	BRI	Herbert Roper Barrett	6–4, 4–6, 2–6, 6–2, retired (Note: Anthony Wilding won the challenge round after Herbert Roper Barrett retired because of fatigue.)
1912	NZL	Anthony Wilding (3/4) †	BRI	Arthur Gore	6–4, 6–4, 4–6, 6–4
1913	NZL	Anthony Wilding (4/4) †	USA	Maurice McLoughlin	8–6, 6–3, 10–8
1914	AUS	Norman Brookes (2/2) ‡	NZL	Anthony Wilding	6–4, 6–4, 7–5
1915	No competition (due to World War I) (Note: The tournament was not held from 1915 to 1918 because of World War I.)				
1916	No competition (due to World War I)				
1917	No competition (due to World War I)				
1918	No competition (due to World War I)				
1919	AUS	Gerald Patterson (1/2) ‡	AUS	Norman Brookes	6–3, 7–5, 6–2
1920	USA	Bill Tilden (1/3) ‡	AUS	Gerald Patterson	2–6, 6–3, 6–2, 6–4
1921	USA	Bill Tilden (2/3) †	RSA	Brian Norton	4–6, 2–6, 6–1, 6–0, 7–5
1922	AUS	Gerald Patterson (2/2)	BRI	Randolph Lycett	6–3, 6–4, 6–2
1923	USA	Bill Johnston	USA	Francis Hunter	6–0, 6–3, 6–1
1924	FRA	Jean Borotra (1/2)	FRA	René Lacoste	6–1, 3–6, 6–1, 3–6, 6–4
1925	FRA	René Lacoste (1/2)	FRA	Jean Borotra	6–3, 6–3, 4–6, 8–6
1926	FRA	Jean Borotra (2/2)	USA	Howard Kinsey	8–6, 6–1, 6–3
1927	FRA	Henri Cochet (1/2)	FRA	Jean Borotra	4–6, 4–6, 6–3, 6–4, 7–5
1928	FRA	René Lacoste (2/2)	FRA	Henri Cochet	6–1, 4–6, 6–4, 6–2
1929	FRA	Henri Cochet (2/2)	FRA	Jean Borotra	6–4, 6–3, 6–4
1930	USA	Bill Tilden (3/3)	USA	Wilmer Allison	6–3, 9–7, 6–4
1931	USA	Sidney Wood	USA	Frank Shields	Walkover (Note: Sidney Wood won the final by walkover after Frank Shields withdrew because of a knee injury.)
1932	USA	Ellsworth Vines	GBR	Bunny Austin	6–4, 6–2, 6–0
1933	AUS	Jack Crawford	USA	Ellsworth Vines	4–6, 11–9, 6–2, 2–6, 6–4
1934	GBR	Fred Perry (1/3)	AUS	Jack Crawford	6–3, 6–0, 7–5
1935	GBR	Fred Perry (2/3)	GER	Gottfried von Cramm	6–2, 6–4, 6–4
1936	GBR	Fred Perry (3/3)	GER	Gottfried von Cramm	6–1, 6–1, 6–0
1937	USA	Don Budge (1/2)	GER	Gottfried von Cramm	6–3, 6–4, 6–2
1938	USA	Don Budge (2/2)	GBR	Bunny Austin	6–1, 6–0, 6–3
1939	USA	Bobby Riggs	USA	Elwood Cooke	2–6, 8–6, 3–6, 6–3, 6–2
1940	No competition (due to World War II) (Note: The tournament was not held from 1940 to 1945 because of World War II.)				
1941	No competition (due to World War II)				
1942	No competition (due to World War II)				
1943	No competition (due to World War II)				
1944	No competition (due to World War II)				
1945	No competition (due to World War II)				
1946	FRA	Yvon Petra	AUS	Geoff Brown	6–2, 6–4, 7–9, 5–7, 6–4
1947	USA	Jack Kramer	USA	Tom Brown	6–1, 6–3, 6–2
1948	USA	Bob Falkenburg	AUS	John Bromwich	7–5, 0–6, 6–2, 3–6, 7–5
1949	USA	Ted Schroeder	TCH	Jaroslav Drobný	3–6, 6–0, 6–3, 4–6, 6–4
1950	USA	Budge Patty	AUS	Frank Sedgman	6–1, 8–10, 6–2, 6–3
1951	USA	Dick Savitt	AUS	Ken McGregor	6–4, 6–4, 6–4
1952	AUS	Frank Sedgman	EGY	Jaroslav Drobný	4–6, 6–2, 6–3, 6–2
1953	USA	Vic Seixas	DEN	Kurt Nielsen	9–7, 6–3, 6–4
1954	EGY	Jaroslav Drobný	AUS	Ken Rosewall	13–11, 4–6, 6–2, 9–7
1955	USA	Tony Trabert	DEN	Kurt Nielsen	6–3, 7–5, 6–1
1956	AUS	Lew Hoad (1/2)	AUS	Ken Rosewall	6–2, 4–6, 7–5, 6–4
1957	AUS	Lew Hoad (2/2)	AUS	Ashley Cooper	6–2, 6–1, 6–2
1958	AUS	Ashley Cooper	AUS	Neale Fraser	3–6, 6–3, 6–4, 13–11
1959	USA	Alex Olmedo	AUS	Rod Laver	6–4, 6–3, 6–4
1960	AUS	Neale Fraser	AUS	Rod Laver	6–4, 3–6, 9–7, 7–5
1961	AUS	Rod Laver (1/4)	USA	Chuck McKinley	6–3, 6–1, 6–4
1962	AUS	Rod Laver (2/4)	AUS	Martin Mulligan	6–2, 6–2, 6–1
1963	USA	Chuck McKinley	AUS	Fred Stolle	9–7, 6–1, 6–4
1964	AUS	Roy Emerson (1/2)	AUS	Fred Stolle	6–4, 12–10, 4–6, 6–3
1965	AUS	Roy Emerson (2/2)	AUS	Fred Stolle	6–2, 6–4, 6–4
1966	ESP	Manuel Santana	USA	Dennis Ralston	6–4, 11–9, 6–4
1967	AUS	John Newcombe (1/3)	FRG	Wilhelm Bungert	6–3, 6–1, 6–1

=== Open Era ===
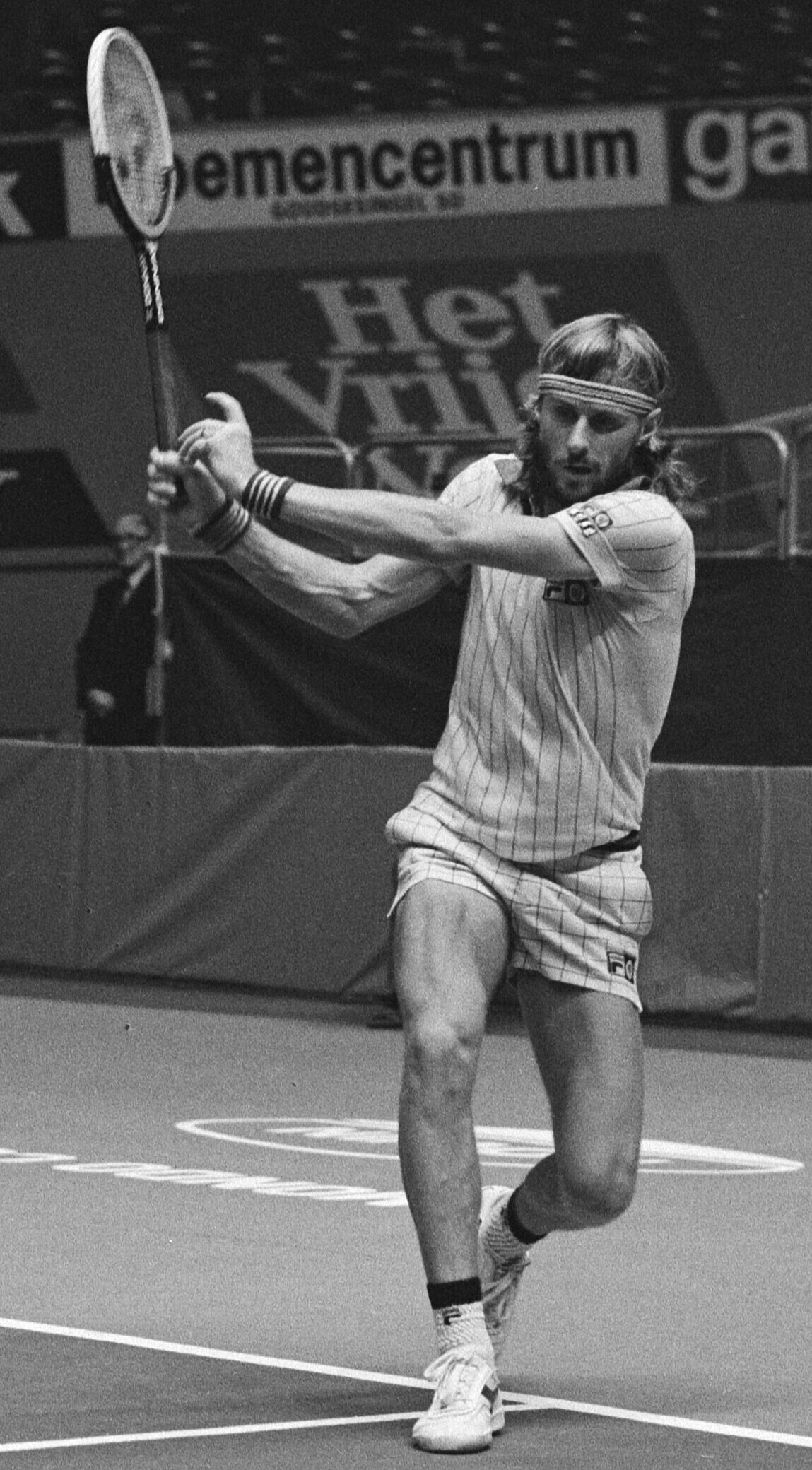
Björn Borg won five consecutive titles between 1976 and 1980.

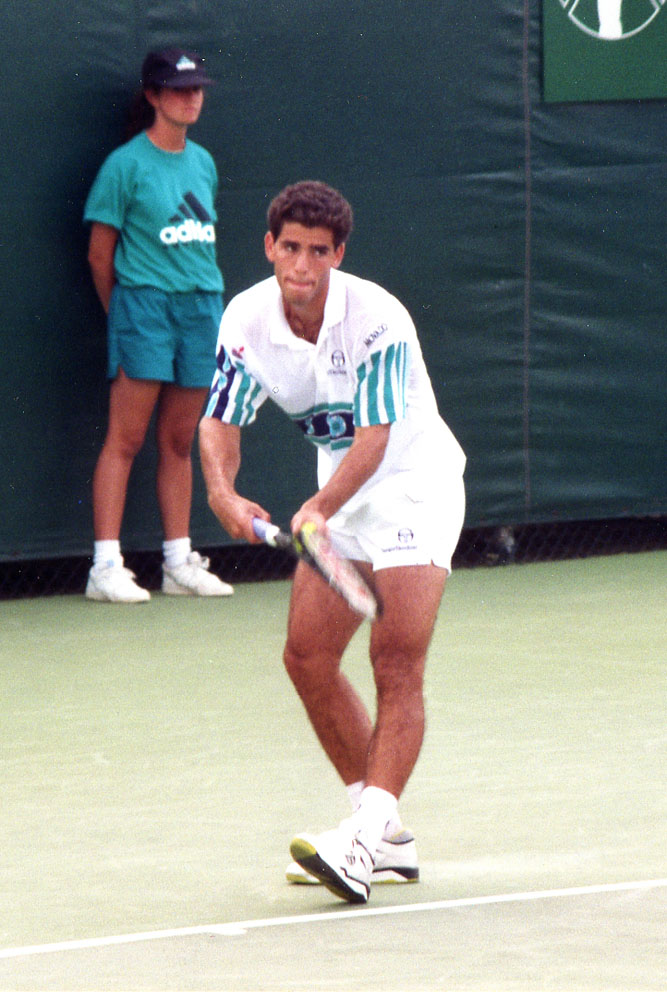
Pete Sampras won seven titles in eight years.

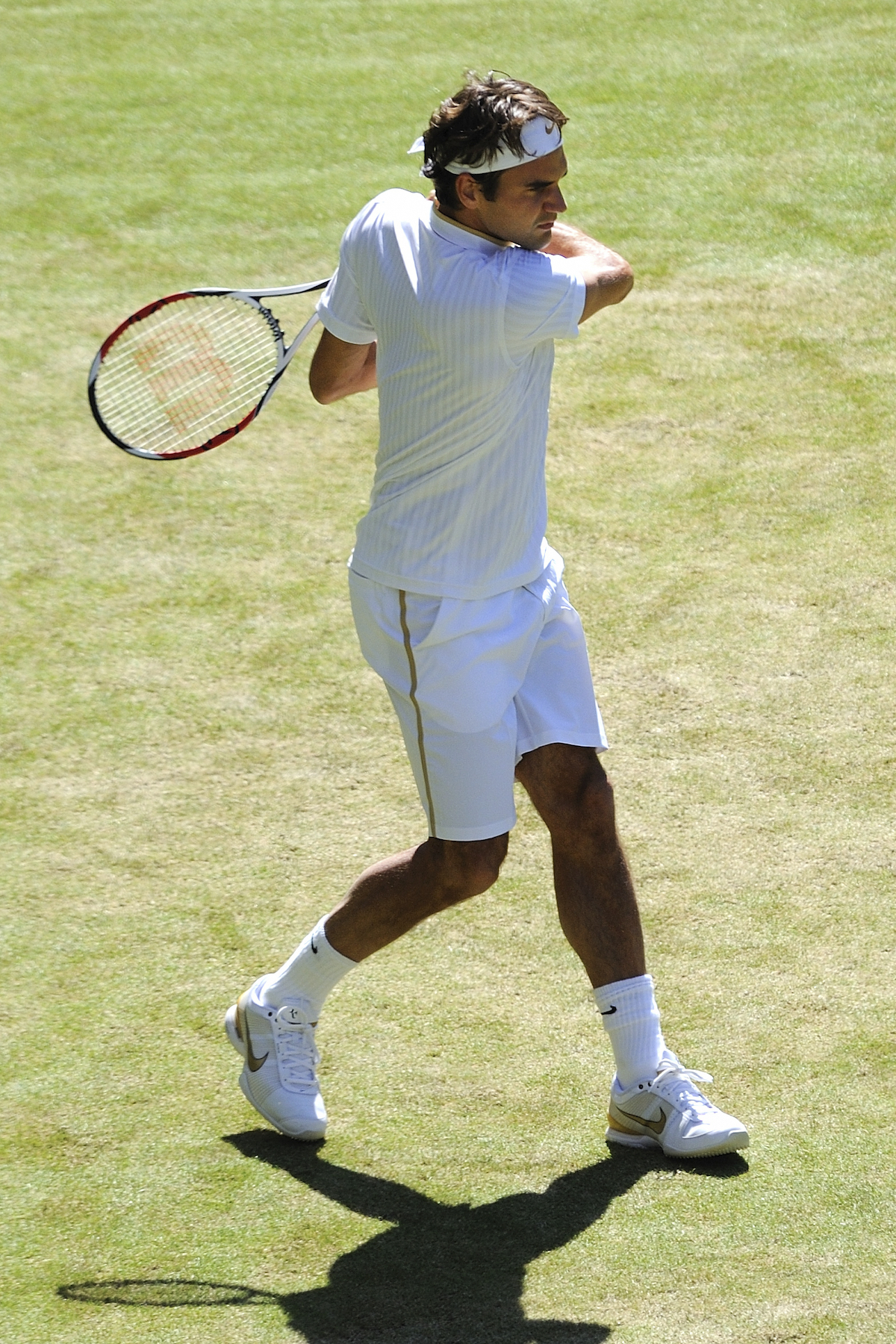
Roger Federer is an eight-time champion, an all-time men's record.

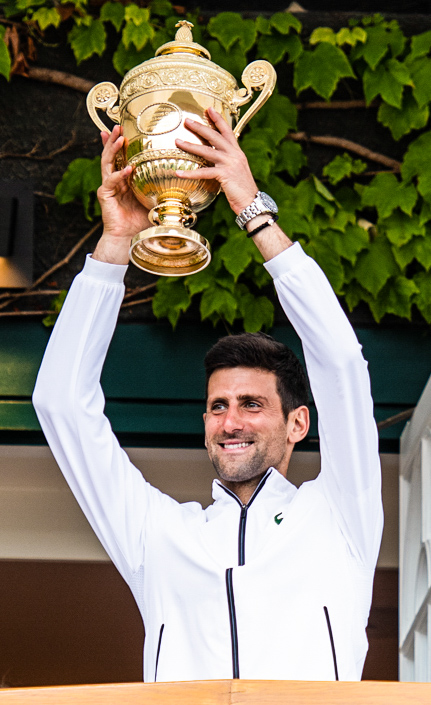
Novak Djokovic, a seven-time champion.

Year	Country	Champion	Country	Runner-up	Score in the final
1968	AUS	Rod Laver (3/4)	AUS	Tony Roche	6–3, 6–4, 6–2
1969	AUS	Rod Laver (4/4)	AUS	John Newcombe	6–4, 5–7, 6–4, 6–4
1970	AUS	John Newcombe (2/3)	AUS	Ken Rosewall	5–7, 6–3, 6–2, 3–6, 6–1
1971	AUS	John Newcombe (3/3)	USA	Stan Smith	6–3, 5–7, 2–6, 6–4, 6–4
1972	USA	Stan Smith	ROU	Ilie Năstase	4–6, 6–3, 6–3, 4–6, 7–5
1973	TCH	Jan Kodeš	URS	Alex Metreveli	6–1, 9–8^{(7–5)}, 6–3
1974	USA	Jimmy Connors (1/2)	AUS	Ken Rosewall	6–1, 6–1, 6–4
1975	USA	Arthur Ashe	USA	Jimmy Connors	6–1, 6–1, 5–7, 6–4
1976	SWE	Björn Borg (1/5)	ROU	Ilie Năstase	6–4, 6–2, 9–7
1977	SWE	Björn Borg (2/5)	USA	Jimmy Connors	3–6, 6–2, 6–1, 5–7, 6–4
1978	SWE	Björn Borg (3/5)	USA	Jimmy Connors	6–2, 6–2, 6–3
1979	SWE	Björn Borg (4/5)	USA	Roscoe Tanner	6–7^{(4–7)}, 6–1, 3–6, 6–3, 6–4
1980	SWE	Björn Borg (5/5)	USA	John McEnroe	1–6, 7–5, 6–3, 6–7^{(16–18)}, 8–6
1981	USA	John McEnroe (1/3)	SWE	Björn Borg	4–6, 7–6^{(7–1)}, 7–6^{(7–4)}, 6–4
1982	USA	Jimmy Connors (2/2)	USA	John McEnroe	3–6, 6–3, 6–7^{(2–7)}, 7–6^{(7–5)}, 6–4
1983	USA	John McEnroe (2/3)	NZL	Chris Lewis	6–2, 6–2, 6–2
1984	USA	John McEnroe (3/3)	USA	Jimmy Connors	6–1, 6–1, 6–2
1985	FRG	Boris Becker (1/3)	USA	Kevin Curren	6–3, 6–7^{(4–7)}, 7–6^{(7–3)}, 6–4
1986	FRG	Boris Becker (2/3)	TCH	Ivan Lendl	6–4, 6–3, 7–5
1987	AUS	Pat Cash	TCH	Ivan Lendl	7–6^{(7–5)}, 6–2, 7–5
1988	SWE	Stefan Edberg (1/2)	FRG	Boris Becker	4–6, 7–6^{(7–2)}, 6–4, 6–2
1989	FRG	Boris Becker (3/3)	SWE	Stefan Edberg	6–0, 7–6^{(7–1)}, 6–4
1990	SWE	Stefan Edberg (2/2)	FRG	Boris Becker	6–2, 6–2, 3–6, 3–6, 6–4
1991	GER	Michael Stich	GER	Boris Becker	6–4, 7–6^{(7–4)}, 6–4
1992	USA	Andre Agassi	CRO	Goran Ivanišević	6–7^{(8–10)}, 6–4, 6–4, 1–6, 6–4
1993	USA	Pete Sampras (1/7)	USA	Jim Courier	7–6^{(7–3)}, 7–6^{(8–6)}, 3–6, 6–3
1994	USA	Pete Sampras (2/7)	CRO	Goran Ivanišević	7–6^{(7–2)}, 7–6^{(7–5)}, 6–0
1995	USA	Pete Sampras (3/7)	GER	Boris Becker	6–7^{(5–7)}, 6–2, 6–4, 6–2
1996	NED	Richard Krajicek	USA	MaliVai Washington	6–3, 6–4, 6–3
1997	USA	Pete Sampras (4/7)	FRA	Cédric Pioline	6–4, 6–2, 6–4
1998	USA	Pete Sampras (5/7)	CRO	Goran Ivanišević	6–7^{(2–7)}, 7–6^{(11–9)}, 6–4, 3–6, 6–2
1999	USA	Pete Sampras (6/7)	USA	Andre Agassi	6–3, 6–4, 7–5
2000	USA	Pete Sampras (7/7)	AUS	Patrick Rafter	6–7^{(10–12)}, 7–6^{(7–5)}, 6–4, 6–2
2001	CRO	Goran Ivanišević	AUS	Patrick Rafter	6–3, 3–6, 6–3, 2–6, 9–7
2002	AUS	Lleyton Hewitt	ARG	David Nalbandian	6–1, 6–3, 6–2
2003	SUI	Roger Federer (1/8)	AUS	Mark Philippoussis	7–6^{(7–5)}, 6–2, 7–6^{(7–3)}
2004	SUI	Roger Federer (2/8)	USA	Andy Roddick	4–6, 7–5, 7–6^{(7–3)}, 6–4
2005	SUI	Roger Federer (3/8)	USA	Andy Roddick	6–2, 7–6^{(7–2)}, 6–4
2006	SUI	Roger Federer (4/8)	ESP	Rafael Nadal	6–0, 7–6^{(7–5)}, 6–7^{(2–7)}, 6–3
2007	SUI	Roger Federer (5/8)	ESP	Rafael Nadal	7–6^{(9–7)}, 4–6, 7–6^{(7–3)}, 2–6, 6–2
2008	ESP	Rafael Nadal (1/2)	SUI	Roger Federer	6–4, 6–4, 6–7^{(5–7)}, 6–7^{(8–10)}, 9–7
2009	SUI	Roger Federer (6/8)	USA	Andy Roddick	5–7, 7–6^{(8–6)}, 7–6^{(7–5)}, 3–6, 16–14
2010	ESP	Rafael Nadal (2/2)	CZE	Tomáš Berdych	6–3, 7–5, 6–4
2011	SRB	Novak Djokovic (1/7)	ESP	Rafael Nadal	6–4, 6–1, 1–6, 6–3
2012	SUI	Roger Federer (7/8)	GBR	Andy Murray	4–6, 7–5, 6–3, 6–4
2013	GBR	Andy Murray (1/2)	SRB	Novak Djokovic	6–4, 7–5, 6–4
2014	SRB	Novak Djokovic (2/7)	SUI	Roger Federer	6–7^{(7–9)}, 6–4, 7–6^{(7–4)}, 5–7, 6–4
2015	SRB	Novak Djokovic (3/7)	SUI	Roger Federer	7–6^{(7–1)}, 6–7^{(10–12)}, 6–4, 6–3
2016	GBR	Andy Murray (2/2)	CAN	Milos Raonic	6–4, 7–6^{(7–3)}, 7–6^{(7–2)}
2017	SUI	Roger Federer (8/8)	CRO	Marin Čilić	6–3, 6–1, 6–4
2018	SRB	Novak Djokovic (4/7)	RSA	Kevin Anderson	6–2, 6–2, 7–6^{(7–3)}
2019	SRB	Novak Djokovic (5/7)	SUI	Roger Federer	7–6^{(7–5)}, 1–6, 7–6^{(7–4)}, 4–6, 13–12^{(7–3)}
2020	No competition (due to COVID-19 pandemic)				
2021	SRB	Novak Djokovic (6/7)	ITA	Matteo Berrettini	6–7^{(4–7)}, 6–4, 6–4, 6–3
2022	SRB	Novak Djokovic (7/7)	AUS	Nick Kyrgios	4–6, 6–3, 6–4, 7–6^{(7–3)}
2023	ESP	Carlos Alcaraz (1/2)	SRB	Novak Djokovic	1–6, 7–6^{(8–6)}, 6–1, 3–6, 6–4
2024	ESP	Carlos Alcaraz (2/2)	SRB	Novak Djokovic	6–2, 6–2, 7–6^{(7–4)}
2025	ITA	Jannik Sinner (1/2)	ESP	Carlos Alcaraz	4–6, 6–4, 6–4, 6–4
2026	ITA	Jannik Sinner (2/2)	GER	Alexander Zverev	6–7^{(7–9)}, 7–6^{(7–2)}, 6–3, 6–4

== Statistics ==
=== Multiple champions ===
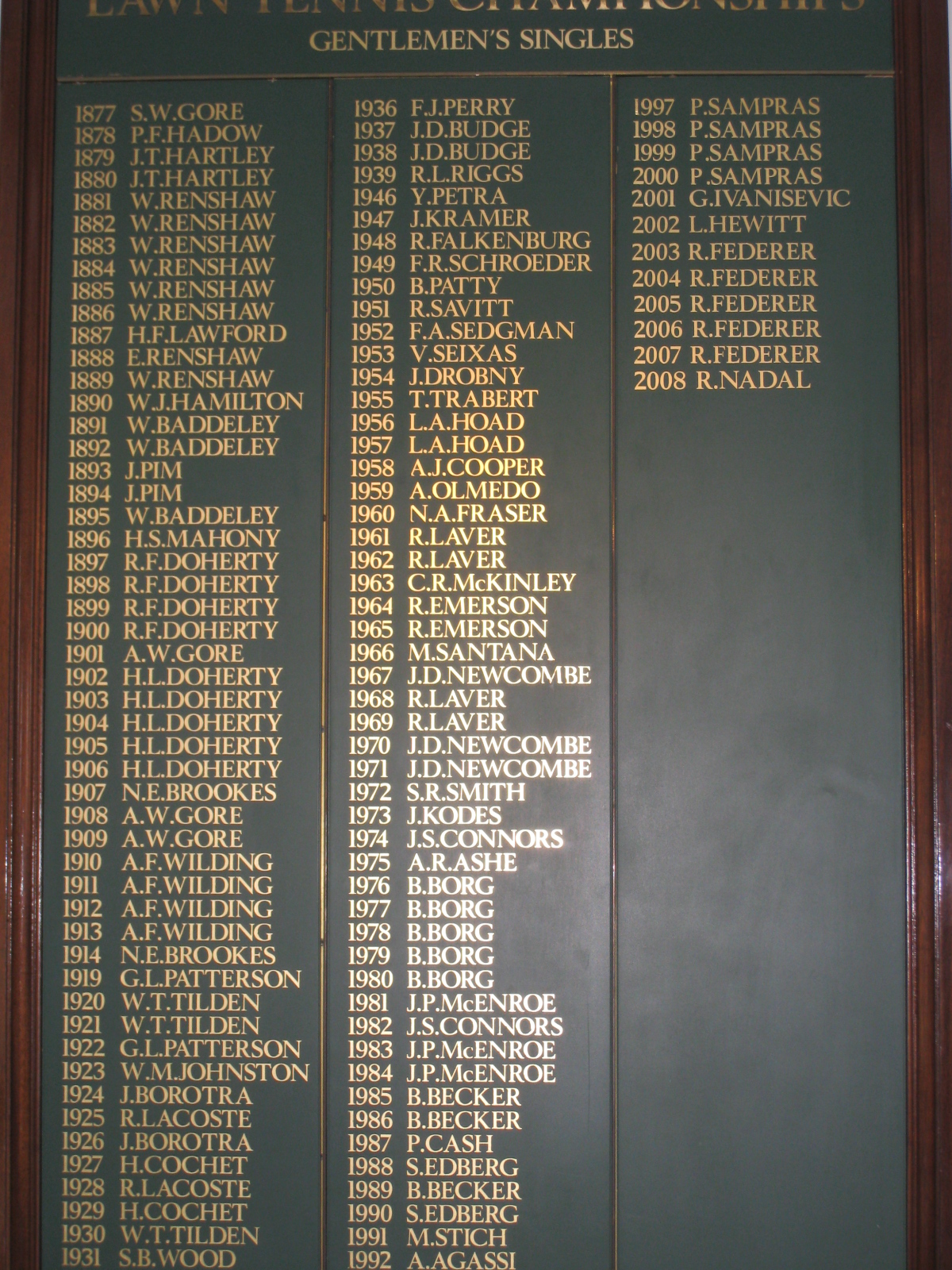
List of champions as of 2008, in the Wimbledon Lawn Tennis Museum.

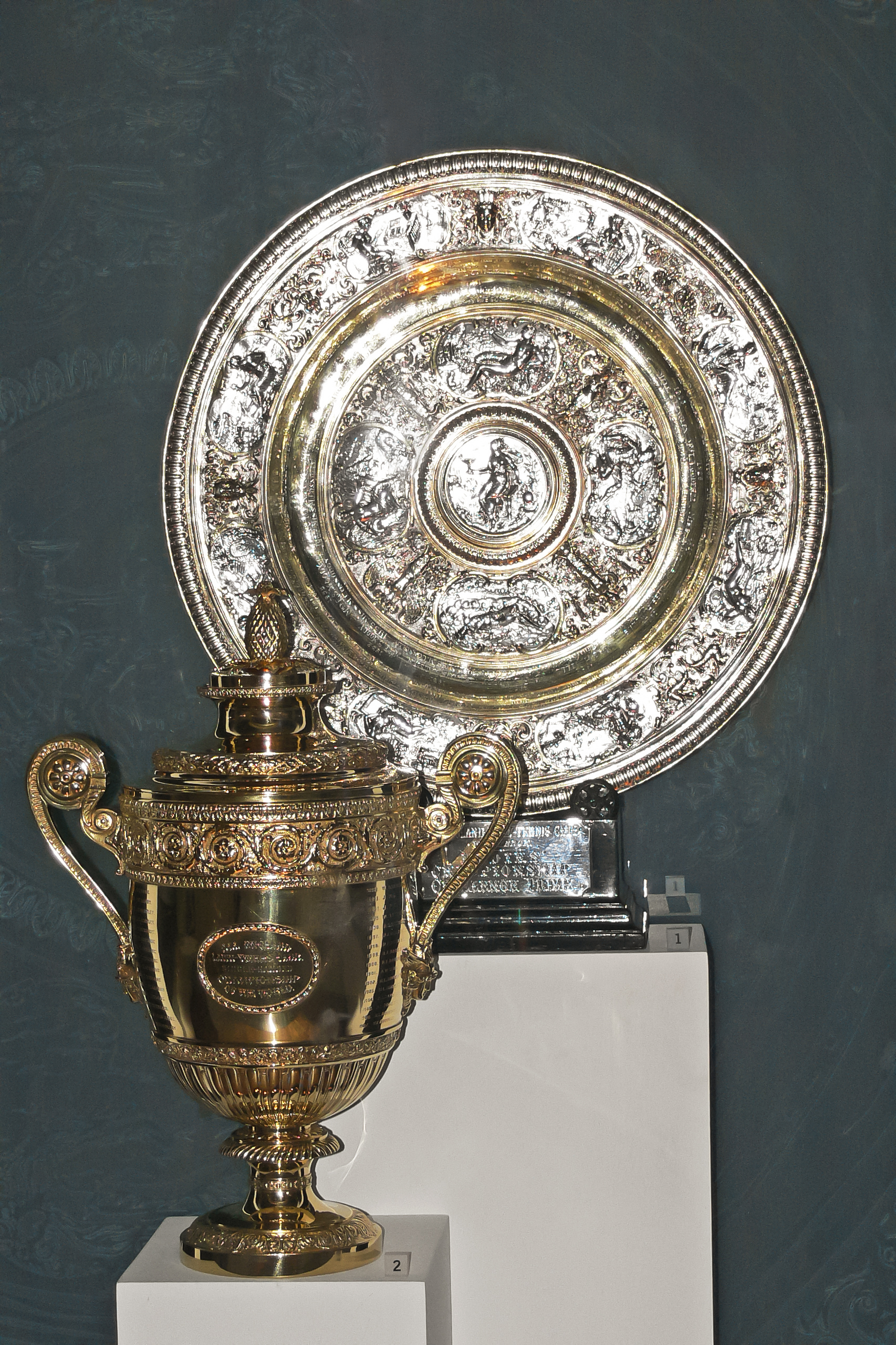
The Gentlemen's Singles trophy (left), and the Ladies' Singles trophy (right).

- Years in italic type denote titles defended in the challenge round.

Player	Open Era	Amateur Era	All-time	Years
Roger Federer (SUI)	8	0	8	2003, 2004, 2005, 2006, 2007, 2009, 2012, 2017
Pete Sampras (USA)	7	0	7	1993, 1994, 1995, 1997, 1998, 1999, 2000
Novak Djokovic (SRB)	7	0	7	2011, 2014, 2015, 2018, 2019, 2021, 2022
William Renshaw (BRI)	0	7	7	1881, 1882, 1883, 1884, 1885, 1886, 1889
Laurence Doherty (BRI)	0	5	5	1902, 1903, 1904, 1905, 1906
Björn Borg (SWE)	5	0	5	1976, 1977, 1978, 1979, 1980
Reginald Doherty (BRI)	0	4	4	1897, 1898, 1899, 1900
Anthony Wilding (NZL)	0	4	4	1910, 1911, 1912, 1913
Rod Laver (AUS)	2	2	4	1961, 1962, 1968, 1969
Wilfred Baddeley (BRI)	0	3	3	1891, 1892, 1895
Arthur Gore (BRI)	0	3	3	1901, 1908, 1909
Bill Tilden (USA)	0	3	3	1920, 1921, 1930
Fred Perry (GBR)	0	3	3	1934, 1935, 1936
John Newcombe (AUS)	2	1	3	1967, 1970, 1971
John McEnroe (USA)	3	0	3	1981, 1983, 1984
Boris Becker (GER)	3	0	3	1985, 1986, 1989
John Hartley (BRI)	0	2	2	1879, 1880
Joshua Pim (BRI)	0	2	2	1893, 1894
Norman Brookes (AUS)	0	2	2	1907, 1914
Gerald Patterson (AUS)	0	2	2	1919, 1922
Jean Borotra (FRA)	0	2	2	1924, 1926
René Lacoste (FRA)	0	2	2	1925, 1928
Henri Cochet (FRA)	0	2	2	1927, 1929
Don Budge (USA)	0	2	2	1937, 1938
Lew Hoad (AUS)	0	2	2	1956, 1957
Roy Emerson (AUS)	0	2	2	1964, 1965
Jimmy Connors (USA)	2	0	2	1974, 1982
Stefan Edberg (SWE)	2	0	2	1988, 1990
Rafael Nadal (ESP)	2	0	2	2008, 2010
Andy Murray (GBR)	2	0	2	2013, 2016
Carlos Alcaraz (ESP)	2	0	2	2023, 2024
Jannik Sinner (ITA)	2	0	2	2025, 2026

=== Championships by country ===
Country	Amateur Era	Open Era	All-time	First title	Last title
Great Britain (GBR) (Note: Thirty-two wins by players from the United Kingdom of Great Britain and Ireland (1801–1922), plus five wins by players from the United Kingdom of Great Britain and Northern Ireland (1922–present).)	35	2	37	1877	2016
United States (USA)	18	15	33	1920	2000
Australia (AUS)	15	6	21	1907	2002
Switzerland (SUI)	0	8	8	2003	2017
France (FRA)	7	0	7	1924	1946
Serbia (SRB)	0	7	7	2011	2022
Sweden (SWE)	0	7	7	1976	1990
Spain (ESP)	1	4	5	1966	2024
Germany (GER) (Note: Three wins by players from West Germany (FRG, 1949–1990), plus one win by a player from Germany (GER, 1990–present).)	0	4	4	1985	1991
New Zealand (NZL)	4	0	4	1910	1913
Italy (ITA)	0	2	2	2025	2026
Croatia (CRO)	0	1	1	2001	2001
Czechoslovakia (TCH) (Note: Czechoslovakia (TCH, 1918–1992) split into the Czech Republic (CZE, 1993–present) and Slovakia (SVK, 1993–present).)	0	1	1	1973	1973
Egypt (EGY)	1	0	1	1954	1954
Netherlands (NED)	0	1	1	1996	1996

== See also ==
Wimbledon Open other competitions

- List of Wimbledon ladies' singles champions
- List of Wimbledon gentlemen's doubles champions
- List of Wimbledon ladies' doubles champions
- List of Wimbledon mixed doubles champions

Grand Slam men's singles

- List of Australian Open men's singles champions
- List of French Open men's singles champions
- List of US Open men's singles champions
- List of Grand Slam men's singles champions

Other events

- Wembley Championships
