= 1879 in tennis =

This page covers all the important events in the sport of tennis in 1879. It provides the results of notable tournaments throughout the year on both the men's and women's ILTF tennis circuits.

== Australian Open ==
No event.

== French Open ==
Not a Grand Slam event.

== Wimbledon ==
Category	Champion(s)	Finalist(s)	Score
Final	(United Kingdom) John Hartley	(United Kingdom) Frank Hadow	walkover (Note: This was Hartley's first major.)
All Comers' Final	(United Kingdom) John Hartley	(United Kingdom) Vere St. Leger Goold	6–2, 6–4, 6–2
Second place match	(United Kingdom) Vere St. Leger Goold	(United Kingdom) Cecil Parr	4–6, 6–2, 5–6, 6–4, 6–4

== US Open ==
No event.
