= 1880 in tennis =

This page covers all the important events in the sport of tennis in 1880. It provides the results of notable tournaments throughout the year on both the men's and women's ILTF tennis circuits.

== Australian Open ==
No event.

== French Open ==
Not a Grand Slam event.

== Wimbledon ==
Category	Champion(s)	Finalist(s)	Score
Final	(United Kingdom) John Hartley	(United Kingdom) Herbert Lawford	6–3, 6–2, 2–6, 6–3 (Note: This was Hartley's second and last Major.)
All Comers' Final	(United Kingdom) Herbert Lawford	(United Kingdom) Otway Woodhouse	7–5, 6–4, 6–0

== US Open ==
No event.
