= Charles David Barry =

Irish sportsman and barrister

Personal information
- Full name: Charles David Barry
- Nationality: GBR
- Born: Charles Barry; 31 March 1867 Dublin, Ireland
- Died: 7 February 1928 (aged 60) Nice, France
- Years active: 1879-1883

Sport
- Country: Ireland
- Sport: Cricket & Tennis
- Club: Phoenix, Dublin University (cricket)
- Turned pro: 1879 (amateur)

Charles Barry
- Full name: Charles David Barry
- Country (sports): Ireland
- Born: 31 March 1867 Dublin, Ireland
- Died: 7 February 1928 (aged 60)
- Turned pro: 1879 (amateur tour)
- Retired: 1879

Singles
- Career record: 8/6 (54.45%)

Grand Slam singles results
- Wimbledon: QF (1879)

Charles David Barry (30 November 1859 – 7 February 1928) was an Irish sportsman who played both cricket and tennis, and later became a barrister, who was active during the later half of the 19th century. As a tennis player 1879 he was a finalist at the very first Irish Lawn Tennis Championships in Dublin, Ireland and a quarter finalist in the singles and doubles events at the 1879 Wimbledon Championships. He was active from 1880 to 1920 and won 4 career titles. As a cricket player he played for the Ireland cricket team in a match against Zingari at Phoenix Park, Dublin. He served as captain of the Dublin University XI and played matches against Australia and an England XI.

== Tennis career ==
Barry is notable for entering two of the major tennis tournaments of the late 19th century. In the spring of 1879 he played at the very first Irish Lawn Tennis Championships where he reached the final before losing to Vere St. Leger Goold. In the summer of 1879 he took part in the Wimbledon Championships where he reached the quarter finals stage, before losing to Cecil Francis Parr.

=== Singles: 1 (1 runner-up) ===
Incomplete Roll

Titles by Surface
Clay – outdoor (0)
Grass – outdoor (1)
Hard – outdoor (0)
Carpet – indoor (0)
Wood – Indoor (0)

No.	Result	Date	Tournament	Surface	Opponent	Score
1.	Loss	1879	Irish Lawn Tennis Championships, Dublin	Grass	(Ireland) Vere St. Leger Goold	6–8, 6–8

== Cricket career ==
Charles Barry was a good all round cricketer, who played four years in the Dublin University XI from 1879, and was captain of that team for a while. In 1880 whilst playing for the university team he played in matches against the Australians and the All England XI. On 27 August 1883 he played one match for the Irish national team versus Zingari at Phoenix Park, Dublin. Barry was also an excellent all round sportsman, being the University rackets champion for three years and also All Ireland Tennis Champion.

== Work career ==
Following his sports career he became at barrister, and had his own practice in Dublin, in addition he served on a number of public bodies in his legal capacity.
