= 1879 Wimbledon Championship =

- Date: 7–16 July
- Edition: 3rd
- Category: Grand Slam
- Surface: Grass
- Location: Worple Road; SW19, Wimbledon, London, United Kingdom
- Venue: All England Croquet and Lawn Tennis Club

Champions

Singles
- (United Kingdom) John Hartley
- Wimbledon Championship

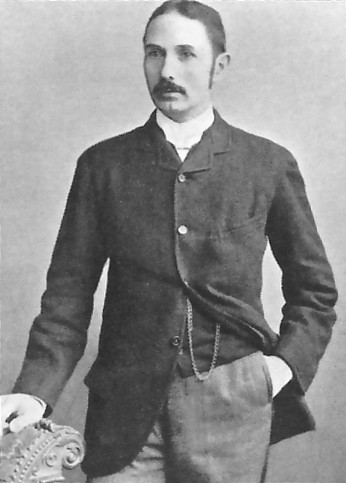
John Hartley

The 1879 Wimbledon Championships took place on the outdoor grass courts at the All England Lawn Tennis and Croquet Club in Wimbledon, London, United Kingdom. The tournament ran from 7 July until 16 July. It was the 3rd staging of the Wimbledon Championships, and the first Grand Slam tennis event of 1879. The entry for the 1879 all comers' tournament was 45, of whom 36 were newcomers. The all comers' final was watched by 1100 spectators.

== Singles ==
=== Final ===
(United Kingdom) John Hartley defeated (United Kingdom) Frank Hadow, walkover

- This was Hartley's first major.

=== All Comers' Final ===
(United Kingdom) John Hartley defeated (United Kingdom) Vere St. Leger Goold, 6–2, 6–4, 6–2

=== Second place match ===
(United Kingdom) Vere St. Leger Goold defeated (United Kingdom) Cecil Parr, 4–6, 6–2, 5–6, 6–4, 6–4

Preceded by 1878 Wimbledon Championships	Grand Slams	Succeeded by 1880 Wimbledon Championships
