= 1881 Wimbledon Championship =

- Date: 2 – 13 July
- Edition: 5th
- Category: Grand Slam
- Surface: Grass
- Location: Worple Road; SW19, Wimbledon, London, United Kingdom
- Venue: All England Croquet and Lawn Tennis Club

Champions

Singles
- (United Kingdom) William Renshaw
- Wimbledon Championship

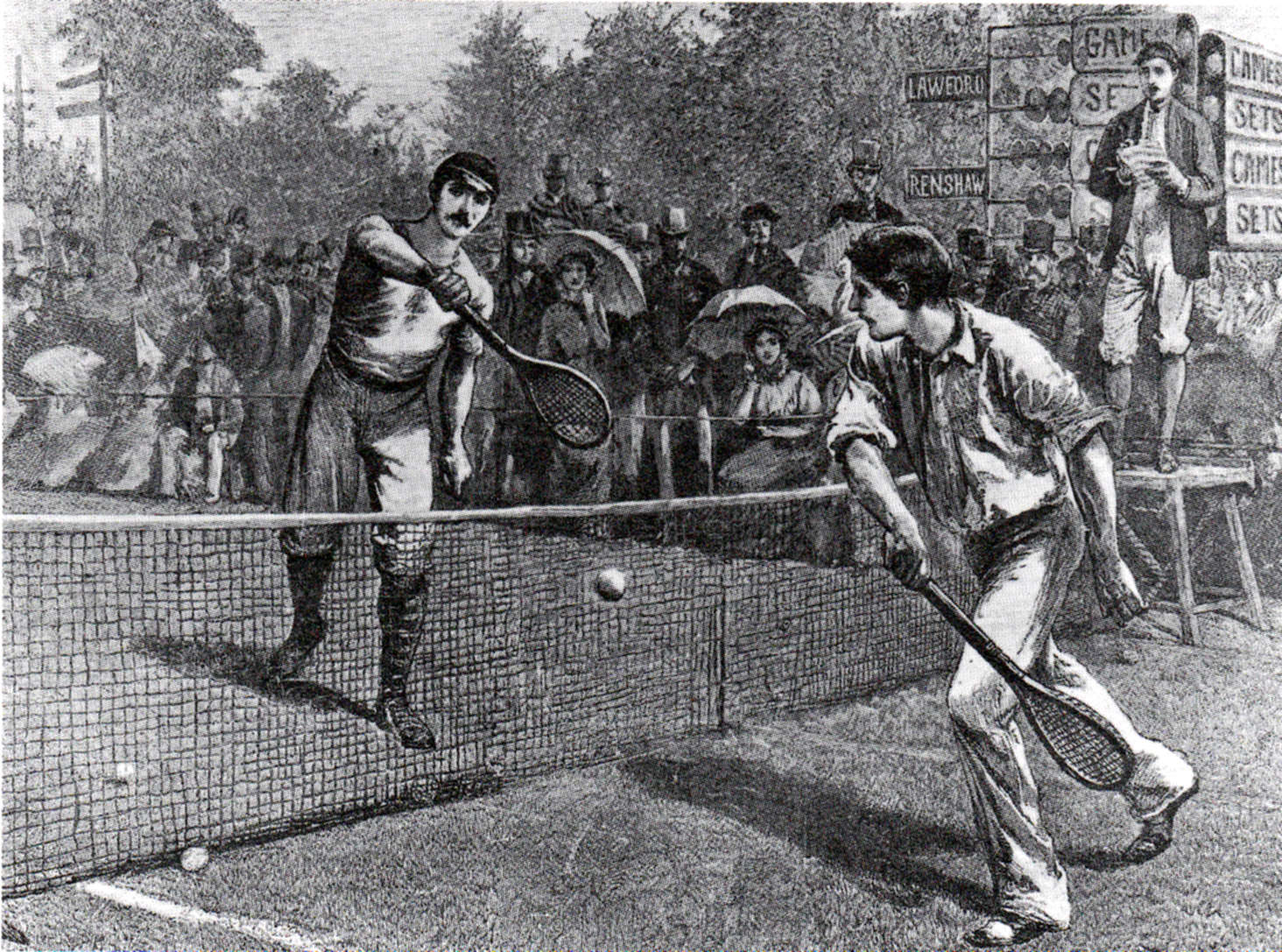
The 5th round match between H.F. Lawford and W. C. Renshaw, won by Renshaw who went on to claim the All Comers' title on 12 July.

The 1881 Wimbledon Championships took place on the outdoor grass courts at the All England Lawn Tennis and Croquet Club in Wimbledon, London, United Kingdom. The tournament ran from 2 to 13 July. It was the 5th edition of the Wimbledon Championships, and the first Grand Slam tennis event of 1881. The defending champion John Hartley lost in straight sets in the final to challenger William Renshaw, who defeated Hartley in 37 minutes, 6–0, 6–1, 6–1. The result is said to have been influenced by Hartley suffering from an attack of 'English cholera'.

== Singles ==
=== Final ===
(United Kingdom) William Renshaw defeated (United Kingdom) John Hartley, 6–0, 6–1, 6–1

=== All Comers' Final ===
(United Kingdom) William Renshaw defeated (United Kingdom) Richard Richardson, 6–4, 6–2, 6–3

Preceded by 1880 Wimbledon Championships	Grand Slams	Succeeded by 1881 U.S. National Championships
