= 1879 Wimbledon Championship – Singles =

Singles
- 1879 Wimbledon Championship

Final
- Champions: (United Kingdom) John Hartley
- Runners-up: (United Kingdom) Vere St. Leger Goold
- Score: 6–2, 6–4, 6–2

Details
- Draw: 45
- Seeds: –

Events
Singles
← 1878 ·	Wimbledon Championship	· 1880 →

John Hartley defeated Vere St. Leger Goold 6–2, 6–4, 6–2 in the all comers' final to win the gentlemen's singles tennis title at the 1879 Wimbledon Championships. The reigning champion Frank Hadow did not defend his title.

== Draw ==
=== Key ===
- Q = Qualifier
- WC = Wild card
- LL = Lucky loser
- Alt = Alternate
- SE = Special exempt
- PR = Protected ranking
- ITF = ITF entry
- JE = Junior exempt
- w/o = Walkover
- r = Retired
- d = Defaulted
- SR = Special ranking

=== Finals ===
Quarterfinals
(United Kingdom) Charles Heathcote	4	3	3
(United Kingdom) John Hartley	6	6	6
(United Kingdom) Cecil Parr	6	6	6
(United Kingdom) Charles Barry	2	5	4
(United Kingdom) George Tabor	2	5	6	3
(United Kingdom) Vere St. Leger Goold	6	6	5	6

Semifinals
(United Kingdom) John Hartley	2	6	6	6
(United Kingdom) Cecil Parr	6	0	1	1
(United Kingdom) Vere St. Leger Goold
bye

Final
(United Kingdom) John Hartley	6	6	6
(United Kingdom) Vere St. Leger Goold	2	4	2
Second Place
(United Kingdom) Cecil Parr	6	2	6	4	4
(United Kingdom) Vere St. Leger Goold	4	6	5	6	6

=== Earlier rounds ===
==== Section 1 ====
First round
(United Kingdom) CL Stephen	w/o
(United Kingdom) Hugh Taylor
(United Kingdom) CJ Coventry	2	6	3	6	5
(United Kingdom) Charles Heathcote	6	4	6	5	6
(United Kingdom) Victor Brooke	w/o
(United Kingdom) Ernest Renshaw
(United Kingdom) BT Cotton	6	3	6	6
(United Kingdom) Alfred Schacht	1	6	1	4
(United Kingdom) Charles Cole	0	0	3
(United Kingdom) John Hartley	6	6	6
(United Kingdom) FW Porter	0	1	1
(United Kingdom) Robert Erskine	6	6	6
(United Kingdom) George Cartland	6	2	6	1	6
(United Kingdom) Henry Mulholland	2	6	3	6	4
(United Kingdom) William Marshall	6	6	6
(United Kingdom) Algernon Cochran	1	2	2

Second round
(United Kingdom) CL Stephen	6	2	1	6	1
(United Kingdom) C Heathcote	1	6	6	5	6
(United Kingdom) V Brooke	4	6	2	6	6
(United Kingdom) BT Cotton	6	3	6	2	1
(United Kingdom) J Hartley	6	6	5	0	6
(United Kingdom) R Erskine	4	5	6	6	5
(United Kingdom) G Cartland	3	2	4
(United Kingdom) W Marshall	6	6	6

Third round
(United Kingdom) C Heathcote	6	6	6
(United Kingdom) V Brooke	2	0	1
(United Kingdom) J Hartley	6	6	4	6
(United Kingdom) W Marshall	1	3	6	1

Quarterfinals
(United Kingdom) C Heathcote	4	3	3
(United Kingdom) J Hartley	6	6	6

==== Section 2 ====
First round
(United Kingdom) Cecil Parr	6	3	6	3	6
(United Kingdom) George Montgomerie	3	6	4	6	3
(United Kingdom) Hubert Medlycott	6	6	4	6
(United Kingdom) Edward Hill	1	0	6	1
(United Kingdom) Capt. Belson	1	5	2
(United Kingdom) Edward Buxton	6	6	6
(United Kingdom) WF Adams	5	1	5
(United Kingdom) Thomas Hoare	6	6	6
(United Kingdom) Arthur Basil-Brooke	6	6	1	6
(United Kingdom) Harry Gillson	5	2	6	4
(United Kingdom) Arthur Myers	6	3	6	6
(United Kingdom) William Wells-Cole	2	6	5	5
(United Kingdom) Charles Barry	6	6	6
(United Kingdom) R Barrington	0	1	1
(United Kingdom) George Arbuthnot	6	4	6	6
(United Kingdom) Otway Woodhouse	2	6	1	2

Second round
(United Kingdom) C Parr	6	6	6
(United Kingdom) H Medlycott	5	5	2
(United Kingdom) E Buxton	3	2	0^{r}
(United Kingdom) T Hoare	6	6	0
(United Kingdom) A Basil-Brooke	1	0	2
(United Kingdom) A Myers	6	6	6
(United Kingdom) Charles Barry	6	6	6
(United Kingdom) G Arbuthnot	1	4	4

Third round
(United Kingdom) C Parr	6	1	6	6
(United Kingdom) T Hoare	4	6	0	2
(United Kingdom) A Myers	3	2	2
(United Kingdom) Charles Barry	6	6	6

Quarterfinals
(United Kingdom) C Parr	6	6	6
(United Kingdom) Charles Barry	2	5	4

==== Section 3 ====
First round
(United Kingdom) George Tabor	w/o
(United Kingdom) William Renshaw
(United Kingdom) WE Martin	6	6	6
(United Kingdom) Lyttleton Winslow	0	1	2
(United Kingdom) Edmond Brackenbury	0	5	4
(United Kingdom) S Pilkington	6	6	6
(United Kingdom) Herbert Lawford	2	6	1	2
(United Kingdom) Edgar Lubbock	6	4	6	6
(United Kingdom) Alfred Mulholland	5	6	6	6
(United Kingdom) Arthur Tabor	6	2	3	0
(United Kingdom) Vere St. Leger Goold	6	6	6
(United Kingdom) F Durant	1	2	3

Second round
(United Kingdom) G Tabor	4	6	6	6
(United Kingdom) WE Martin	6	4	5	4
(United Kingdom) S Pilkington	2	2	0
(United Kingdom) E Lubbock	6	6	6
(United Kingdom) AJ Mulholland
bye
(United Kingdom) V Goold	6	6	6
(United Kingdom) JD Vans Agnew	2	3	1

Third round
(United Kingdom) G Tabor	5	4	6	6	6
(United Kingdom) E Lubbock	6	6	5	1	5
(United Kingdom) AJ Mulholland	4	6	1	4
(United Kingdom) V Goold	6	2	6	6

Quarterfinals
(United Kingdom) G Tabor	2	5	6	3
(United Kingdom) V Goold	6	6	5	6
