= Frederick Crowder (sportsman) =

English cricketer and tennis player (1845–1938)

Personal information
- Full name: Frederick Crowder
- Born: 8 October 1845; Marylebone, Middlesex, England
- Died: 27 March 1938 (aged 92); Oxford, Oxfordshire, England
- Batting: Unknown

Domestic team information
- Years: Team
- 1874: Marylebone Cricket Club

Career statistics
Competition	First-class
Matches	2
Runs scored	25
Batting average	5.00
100s/50s	–/–
Top score	14
Catches/stumpings	1/–
- Source: Cricinfo, 11 August 2019

Frederick Crowder (8 October 1845 – 27 March 1938) was an English first-class cricketer and tennis player.

== Cricket career ==
The son of George Augustus Crowder, he was born at Marylebone in October 1845. He was educated at Rugby School, before going up to Brasenose College, Oxford. Crowder was a student of the Inner Temple, though it is uncertain whether he was ever called to the bar. While studying at Oxford, he did not play first-class cricket for Oxford University. Instead, his debut in first-class cricket came in 1873 for the Gentlemen of England against Oxford University at Oxford. The following year he made two further first-class appearances, playing one match each for the Marylebone Cricket Club against Oxford University, and for the Gentlemen of England against Cambridge University at Fenner's.

== Tennis career ==
In addition to playing cricket, Crowder was also a notable tennis player. He took part in the 1880 Wimbledon Championship, where he received a walkover to the second round following the withdrawal of William Llewellyn Hacon. He was defeated in straight sets by F. Durant in the second round. He died at Oxford in March 1938.
