= 1880 Wimbledon Championship =

- Date: 5 – 15 July
- Edition: 4th
- Category: Grand Slam
- Surface: Grass
- Location: Worple Road; SW19, Wimbledon, London, United Kingdom
- Venue: All England Croquet and Lawn Tennis Club

Champions

Singles
- (United Kingdom) John Hartley
- Wimbledon Championship

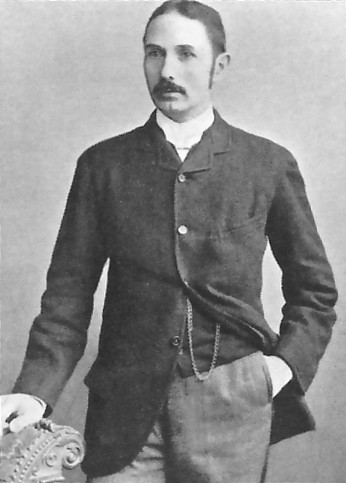
John Hartley (1849-1935), English clergyman and tennis player, Wimbledon champion in 1879 and 1880

The 1880 Wimbledon Championships took place on the outdoor grass courts at the All England Lawn Tennis and Croquet Club in Wimbledon, London, United Kingdom. The tournament ran from 5 July until 15 July. It was the 4th staging of the Wimbledon Championships, and the first Grand Slam tennis event of 1880. There were a total of 60 competitors who entered the tournament, a record until the 1904 draw. The admission charge remained at a shilling for the first four days, then raised to half a crown for the latter half of the draw. The final was watched by 1300 spectators. The height of the net was reduced from 4 feet 9 inches (1.45 m) at the posts to 4 feet (1.2 m) and the distance from the service line to the net was reduced from 22 feet (6.7 m) to 21 feet (6.4 m).

Changes to the rules made a service touching the net, but otherwise good, a 'let'; while a player touching the net, or volleying before the ball crossed the net, lost the point. Scoreboards were provided for the first time.

== Singles ==
=== Final ===
(United Kingdom) John Hartley defeated (United Kingdom) Herbert Lawford, 6–3, 6–2, 2–6, 6–3

- This was Hartley's second and last Major.

=== All Comers' Final ===
(United Kingdom) Herbert Lawford defeated (United Kingdom) Otway Woodhouse, 7–5, 6–4, 6–0

| Preceded by 1879 Wimbledon Championships | Grand Slams | Succeeded by 1881 Wimbledon Championships |
