= William Trollope =

English cricketer

William Stapleton Trollope (31 July 1854 – 20 September 1895) was an English first-class cricketer active in the years 1877–87, who played for Surrey. He was born in South Lambeth and died in Southampton. In 1895, Trollope died in hospital after falling off a boat. He was found with throat wounds that were alleged to have been self-inflicted.
