= Cecil Parr =

British tennis player

- Full name: Cecil Francis Parr
- Country (sports): United Kingdom
- Born: 2 August 1847 Grappenhall, Cheshire, United Kingdom
- Died: 13 January 1928 (aged 80) Hertfordshire, United Kingdom
- Turned pro: 1879 (amateur tour)
- Retired: 1880

Grand Slam singles results
- Wimbledon: SF (1879)

Cecil Parr (2 August 1847 – 13 January 1928) was a British tennis player in the early years of Wimbledon. He only entered the Wimbledon singles once (in 1879) and beat George Montgomerie, Hubert Medlycott, Thomas Hoare and Charles Barry before losing in the semi-finals to Reverend John Hartley.
