= 1880 Wimbledon Championship – Singles =

Singles
- 1880 Wimbledon Championship

Final
- Champions: (United Kingdom) John Hartley
- Runners-up: (United Kingdom) Herbert Lawford
- Score: 6–3, 6–2, 2–6, 6–3

Details
- Draw: 60
- Seeds: –

Events
Singles
- Wimbledon Championship

Herbert Lawford defeated Otway Woodhouse, 6–5, 6–4, 6–0 in the All Comers' Final, but the reigning champion John Hartley defeated Lawford, 6–3, 6–2, 2–6, 6–3 in the challenge round to win the gentlemen's singles tennis title at the 1880 Wimbledon Championships.

== Draw ==
Key

- Q = Qualifier
- WC = Wild card
- LL = Lucky loser
- Alt = Alternate
- ITF = ITF entry
- PR = Protected ranking
- SR = Special ranking
- SE = Special exempt
- JE = Junior exempt
- JR = Junior Accelerator Programme entrant
- CO = College Accelerator Programme entrant
- NG = Next Gen Accelerator Program entrant
- w/o = Walkover
- r = Retired
- d = Defaulted

=== Challenge round ===
| Challenge Round |
| (United Kingdom) Herbert Lawford | 3 | 2 | 6 | 3 |
| (United Kingdom) John Hartley | 6 | 6 | 2 | 6 |

=== All comers' finals ===
Quarterfinals
(United Kingdom) Otway Woodhouse | 6 | 6 | 3 | 6
(United Kingdom) Ernest Renshaw | 3 | 3 | 6 | 0
(United Kingdom) George Montgomerie | 6 | 5 | 6 | 2 | 6
(United Kingdom) HC Jenkins | 3 | 6 | 2 | 6 | 3
(United Kingdom) Herbert Lawford | 6 | 6 | 6
(United Kingdom) WH d'Esterre | 0 | 3 | 1
(United Kingdom) RR Farrer | 6 | 1 | 4 | 5
(United Kingdom) George Butterworth | 1 | 6 | 6 | 6

Semifinals
(United Kingdom) Otway Woodhouse | 6 | 2 | 6 | 5 | 6
(United Kingdom) George Montgomerie | 4 | 6 | 3 | 6 | 1
(United Kingdom) Herbert Lawford | 6 | 6 | 6
(United Kingdom) George Butterworth | 2 | 3 | 3

Final
(United Kingdom) Otway Woodhouse | 5 | 4 | 0
(United Kingdom) Herbert Lawford | 6 | 6 | 6

=== Top half ===
==== Section 1 ====
First round
(United Kingdom) Dale Womersley | 6 | 2 | 6 | 6
(United Kingdom) Victor Brooke | 3 | 6 | 5 | 3
(United Kingdom) William Renshaw | 6 | 6 | 6
(United Kingdom) Frederick Maddison | 3 | 0 | 4
(United Kingdom) Otway Woodhouse | 5 | 6 | 6 | 6
(United Kingdom) JH Brand | 6 | 1 | 0 | 3
(United Kingdom) Francis Monement | 6 | 6 | 3 | 6
(United Kingdom) B Follett | 2 | 3 | 6 | 3
(United Kingdom) CH Evill | 6 | 6 | 6
(United Kingdom) WM Bird | 3 | 1 | 0
(United Kingdom) HJ Medlycott | 5 | 6 | 6 | 4 | 6
(United Kingdom) Edward Buxton | 6 | 5 | 3 | 6 | 5
(United Kingdom) Ernest Renshaw | 6 | 6 | 6
(United Kingdom) FG Templer | 1 | 5 | 1
(United Kingdom) CD Heatley | 6 | 6 | 6
(United Kingdom) RC Christian | 1 | 2 | 1

Second round
(United Kingdom) D Womersley | 2 | 4 | 0
(United Kingdom) W Renshaw | 6 | 6 | 6
(United Kingdom) O Woodhouse | 6 | 6 | 6
(United Kingdom) F Monement | 3 | 3 | 5
(United Kingdom) CH Evill | 4 | 3 | 0
(United Kingdom) HJ Medleycott | 6 | 6 | 6
(United Kingdom) E Renshaw | 6 | 2 | 6 | 6
(United Kingdom) CD Heatley | 2 | 6 | 4 | 2

Third round
(United Kingdom) W Renshaw | 6 | 3 | 3 | 4
(United Kingdom) O Woodhouse | 5 | 6 | 6 | 6
(United Kingdom) HJ Medleycott | 3 | 3 | 3
(United Kingdom) JE Renshaw | 6 | 6 | 6

Quarterfinals
(United Kingdom) O Woodhouse | 6 | 6 | 3 | 6
(United Kingdom) E Renshaw | 3 | 3 | 6 | 0

==== Section 2 ====
First round
(United Kingdom) Henry Mulholland | 4 | 6 | 2 | 6 | 6
(United Kingdom) GE Tabor | 6 | 3 | 6 | 3 | 3
(United Kingdom) CJ Cole | 6 | 5 | 5 | 6 | 6
(United Kingdom) Seton Montgomerie | 4 | 6 | 6 | 3 | 2
(United Kingdom) G Montgomerie | 6 | 6 | 6
(United Kingdom) WF Wells-Cole | 2 | 5 | 5
(United Kingdom) T Taylor | 4 | 6 | 3 | 5
(United Kingdom) CL Stephen | 6 | 4 | 6 | 6
(United Kingdom) GS Murray-Hill | 6 | 6 | 6
(United Kingdom) HE Solly | 1 | 0 | 1
(United Kingdom) RH Beresford | 6 | 6 | 5 | 6
(United Kingdom) William Trollope | 5 | 3 | 6 | 5
(United Kingdom) HC Jenkins | 6 | 6 | 6
(United Kingdom) HR Hallward | 0 | 0 | 2
(United Kingdom) Arthur Tabor | 6 | 6 | 6
(United Kingdom) Frank Benson | 1 | 0 | 3

Second round
(United Kingdom) H Mulholland
(United Kingdom) CJ Cole | w/o
(United Kingdom) G Montgomerie | 6 | 6 | 6
(United Kingdom) CL Stephen | 2 | 2 | 0
(United Kingdom) GS Murray-Hill | 6 | 6 | 6
(United Kingdom) RH Beresford | 3 | 1 | 3
(United Kingdom) HC Jenkins | 3 | 6 | 6 | 6
(United Kingdom) A Tabor | 6 | 3 | 2 | 2

Third round
(United Kingdom) CJ Cole | 0 | 1 | 1
(United Kingdom) G Montgomerie | 6 | 6 | 6
(United Kingdom) GS Murray-Hill | 4 | 4 | 2
(United Kingdom) HC Jenkins | 6 | 6 | 6

Quarterfinals
(United Kingdom) G Montgomerie | 6 | 5 | 6 | 2 | 6
(United Kingdom) HC Jenkins | 3 | 6 | 2 | 6 | 3

=== Bottom half ===
==== Section 3 ====
First round
(United Kingdom) Herbert Lawford | 6 | 6 | 6
(United Kingdom) JE Eddis | 2 | 2 | 4
(United Kingdom) W.B. Monement | 6 | 6 | 6
(United Kingdom) F Harold | 0 | 0 | 3
(United Kingdom) Richard Richardson | 6 | 6 | 6
(United Kingdom) Kaye Butterworth | 5 | 3 | 1
(United Kingdom) Kenneth McAlpine | 6 | 6 | 6
(United Kingdom) ML Hallward | 5 | 5 | 3
(United Kingdom) F Durant | 6 | 6 | 6
(United Kingdom) H Daly | 2 | 1 | 1
(United Kingdom) Frederick Crowder | w/o
(United Kingdom) WL Hacon
(United Kingdom) MG MacNamara | 6 | 6 | 6
(United Kingdom) JC Maxwell-Scott | 2 | 0 | 4
(United Kingdom) WH d'Esterre | 6 | 5 | 6 | 6
(United Kingdom) BF Buxton | 4 | 6 | 4 | 4

Second round
(United Kingdom) H Lawford | 6 | 6 | 6
(United Kingdom) W.B. Monement | 2 | 1 | 1
(United Kingdom) R Richardson | 6 | 6 | 6
(United Kingdom) K McAlpine | 1 | 0 | 3
(United Kingdom) F Durant | 6 | 6 | 6
(United Kingdom) Frederick Crowder | 4 | 5 | 2
(United Kingdom) MG MacNamara | 2 | 1 | 6 | 4
(United Kingdom) WH d'Esterre | 6 | 6 | 2 | 6

Third round
(United Kingdom) H Lawford | 1 | 6 | 0 | 6 | 6
(United Kingdom) R Richardson | 6 | 3 | 6 | 5 | 4
(United Kingdom) F Durant | 3 | 2 | 6 | 6 | 1
(United Kingdom) WH d'Esterre | 6 | 6 | 5 | 5 | 6

Quarterfinals
(United Kingdom) H Lawford | 6 | 6 | 6
(United Kingdom) WH d'Esterre | 0 | 3 | 1

==== Section 4 ====
First round
(United Kingdom) Montague Hankey | 2 | 2 | 3
(United Kingdom) RR Farrer | 6 | 6 | 6
(United Kingdom) WE Hansell | 4 | 6 | 6 | 6
(United Kingdom) William Marshall | 6 | 4 | 5 | 3
(United Kingdom) C Wallis | 6 | 6 | 4 | 6
(United Kingdom) BT Cotton | 2 | 5 | 6 | 5
(United Kingdom) Charles Heathcote | 6 | 6 | 6
(United Kingdom) WF Clerke | 5 | 2 | 5
(United Kingdom) George Butterworth | 6 | 6 | 5 | 6
(United Kingdom) Nalton Womersley | 2 | 2 | 6 | 5
(United Kingdom) J Devans | 6 | 6 | 6
(United Kingdom) William Taylor | 2 | 2 | 3

Second round
(United Kingdom) RR Farrer | 6 | 4 | 4 | 6 | 6
(United Kingdom) WE Hansell | 1 | 6 | 6 | 0 | 4
(United Kingdom) C Wallis | 4 | 6 | 0 | 5
(United Kingdom) C Heathcote | 6 | 2 | 6 | 6
(United Kingdom) G Butterworth | 4 | 6 | 6 | 6
(United Kingdom) J Devans | 6 | 4 | 3 | 3

Third round
(United Kingdom) RR Farrer | 5 | 6 | 6 | 6
(United Kingdom) C Heathcote | 6 | 1 | 0 | 3
(United Kingdom) G Butterworth
bye

Quarterfinals
(United Kingdom) RR Farrer | 6 | 1 | 4 | 5
(United Kingdom) G Butterworth | 1 | 6 | 6 | 6
