= Otway Woodhouse =

British tennis player

- Full name: Otway Edward Woodhouse
- Country (sports): United Kingdom
- Born: 21 October 1855; London, United Kingdom
- Died: 21 September 1887 (aged 31); Brighton, Sussex, United Kingdom
- Turned pro: 1879 (amateur tour)
- Retired: 1883

Singles

Grand Slam singles results
- Wimbledon: F (1880)

Doubles

Grand Slam doubles results
- Wimbledon: 1R (1885)

Otway Woodhouse (21 October 1855 – 21 September 1887) was a British tennis player in the early years of Wimbledon. Woodhouse worked for the Great Eastern Railway and later the London & South Western Railway. In 1881 Woodhouse and F. L. Rawson founded Woodhouse & Rawson (a well known company who specialised in engineering and electric lighting). Woodhouse first entered the Wimbledon singles in 1879 and lost in the first round. In 1880 he reached the all comer's final (beating William Renshaw and Ernest Renshaw before losing to Herbert Lawford). William Renshaw won the first of his seven titles the following year and beat Woodhouse in the quarter-finals. Woodhouse reached the quarter-finals again in 1882, losing to Richard Richardson. In 1883 Woodhouse lost in the first round. In 1880 he entered the first unofficial U.S. Championships men's singles event at Staten Island, New York (played with an unconventional scoring system) and won the tournament. By 1885 his workaholic nature was putting a strain on his health, so he went on a sabbatical to Cannes. However, whilst there he caught an illness. He died aged just 31 in 1887 (overwork in the period 1881 to 1885 being a main factor in his death).
