= Vere St. Leger Goold =

Irish tennis player

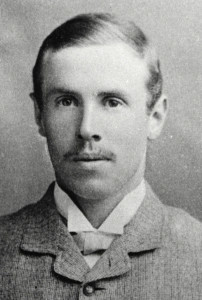
- Goold, in 1879
- Full name: Vere Thomas Goold
- Country (sports): United Kingdom
- Born: 2 October 1853 Clonmel, County Tipperary, Ireland
- Died: 19 April 1909 (aged 55) Île du Salut, French Guiana

Singles
- Career titles: 6

Grand Slam singles results
- Wimbledon: F (1879)

Vere Thomas "St. Leger" Goold (2 October 1853 – 8 September 1909) was an Irish tennis player who competed for the 1879 Wimbledon All Comers' final. That year he became the first singles champion of the Irish Championships. He quickly faded from the game and in 1907 was sentenced to life imprisonment on Devil's Island for the murder of a Swedish widow in Monte Carlo. In 1909 he died there by suicide.

== Career ==
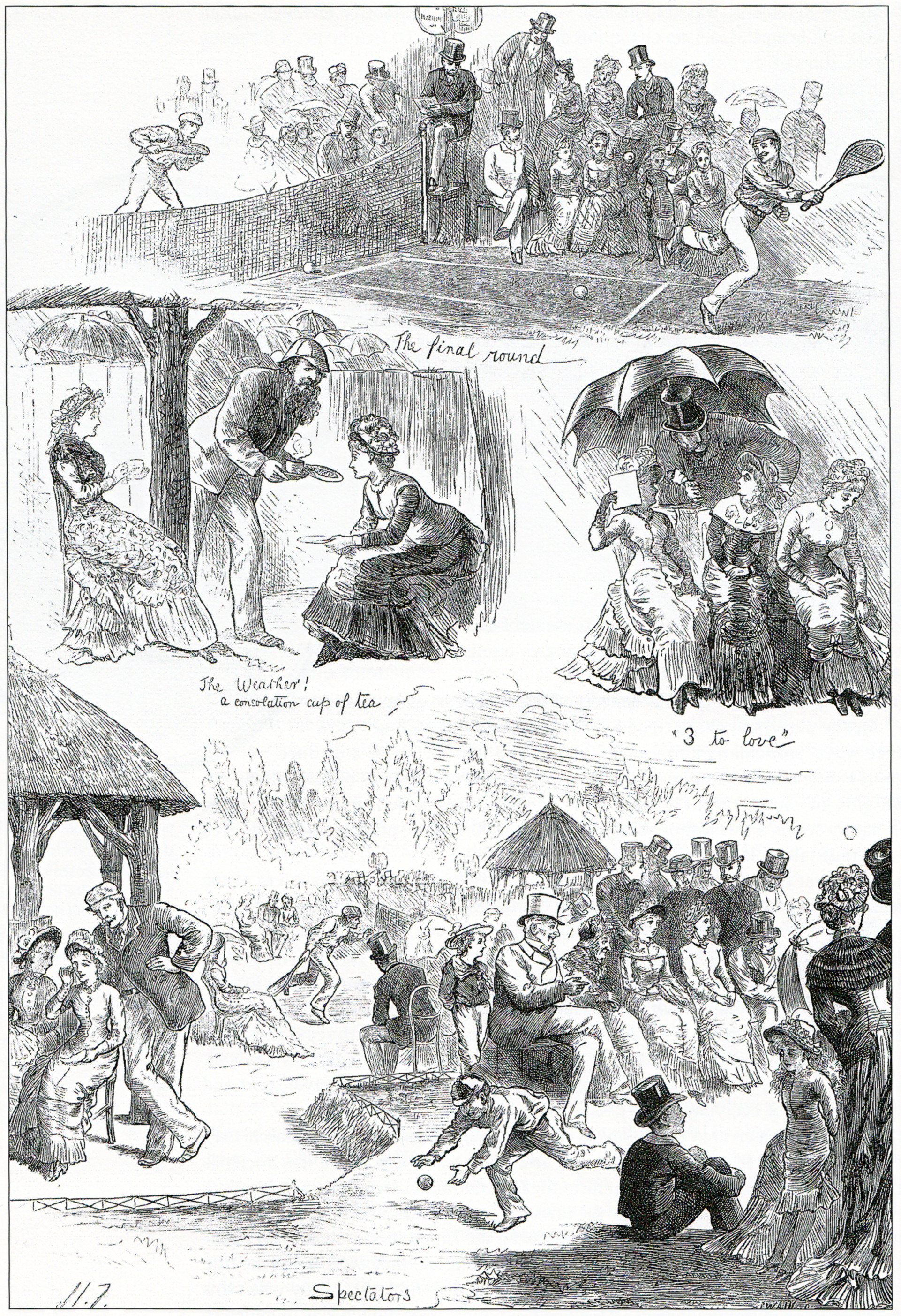
Wimbledon Lawn tennis final 15 July 1879

Vere Goold was born into a wealthy family. In his early life, he apparently had boxing skills as well as tennis skills. In June 1879, he became the first Irish tennis champion after defeating C.D. Barry, 8–6, 8–6 in the final. Later that summer, Vere tried his luck at the third Wimbledon Championships and made it to the All-Comers final on 15 July in which he was defeated by John Hartley, 2–6, 4–6, 2–6.

A few months later, he competed in the first open tournament held at Cheltenham. He again reached the final and lost to William Renshaw, 4–6, 3–6, 6–5, 6–5, 4–6. He had a 4–1 lead in the final set.

After an illness, he failed to defend his Irish title in 1880, losing out in the Challenge Round, again to William Renshaw 1–6, 4–6, 3–6. St. Leger's career went downhill, and he disappeared from the tennis scene by 1883.

== Personal life and murder conviction ==
Vere Goold's life after 1883 was wasted on drink and drugs. One day, he was asked by a relative to pay a bill at a dressmaker's shop in the Bayswater area of London, that was owned by Marie Giraudin. This French lady (from most accounts), though not especially beautiful, could charm people when she wanted. It was not too difficult for her to charm Goold, who was from a prominent Irish social family. The accounts of the case are not always in tandem, but she had been married twice before, and she was a woman of expensive tastes. The dressmaker's shop was not a real success, especially as Giraudin apparently borrowed money from many of her customers.

In 1891, Goold married Giraudin. The couple quickly descended into debt. They moved to Montreal, Quebec, Canada in 1897 where Marie had a dressmaking establishment before moving to Liverpool in 1903 to manage a laundry business.

In 1907, Mrs Goold persuaded Vere Goold to go to the Monte Carlo Casino. She thought she had a winning method for the gambling tables. They took with them her niece Isabelle Giraudin. They also used the titles of "Sir" Vere and "Lady" Goold, which they claimed they were entitled to use. According to a book by Charles Kingston, their system did not work, but Leonard Gribble's account suggests that it worked for at least a couple of days or a week. However, the Goolds soon were without funds. At the casino, they met a wealthy Swedish woman, Emma Levin, the widow of a Stockholm broker. Mrs Levin already had a friend named Madame Castellazi accompanying her, but soon the widow had Mrs. Goold as well. The two "hangers-on" detested each other, and finally had a public dispute in the casino.

At this point, the sources on the case vary again. Either Marie Goold or her husband Vere Goold borrowed £40 from Madame Levin, and she wanted it repaid. Kingston makes it seem that, when confronting Marie Goold, the widow saw what a dangerous person the latter was. Gribble suggests that the demand to Vere Goold for repayment played into Marie Goold's scheme to murder the widow for the purposes of theft (of her cash and jewels). On 4 August 1907, Madame Levin went to their hotel to collect the debt before she left Monte Carlo. Madame Castellazi was waiting for her at Madame Levin's hotel, and when she did not come by midnight, she went to the police. They went to the hotel of the Goolds. Vere and Marie Goold had left for Marseille, but they left Isabelle behind (explaining that Mr Goold had to see a doctor there). Bloodstains were found in the suite as well as some items, such as a saw and a hammer, with blood on them.

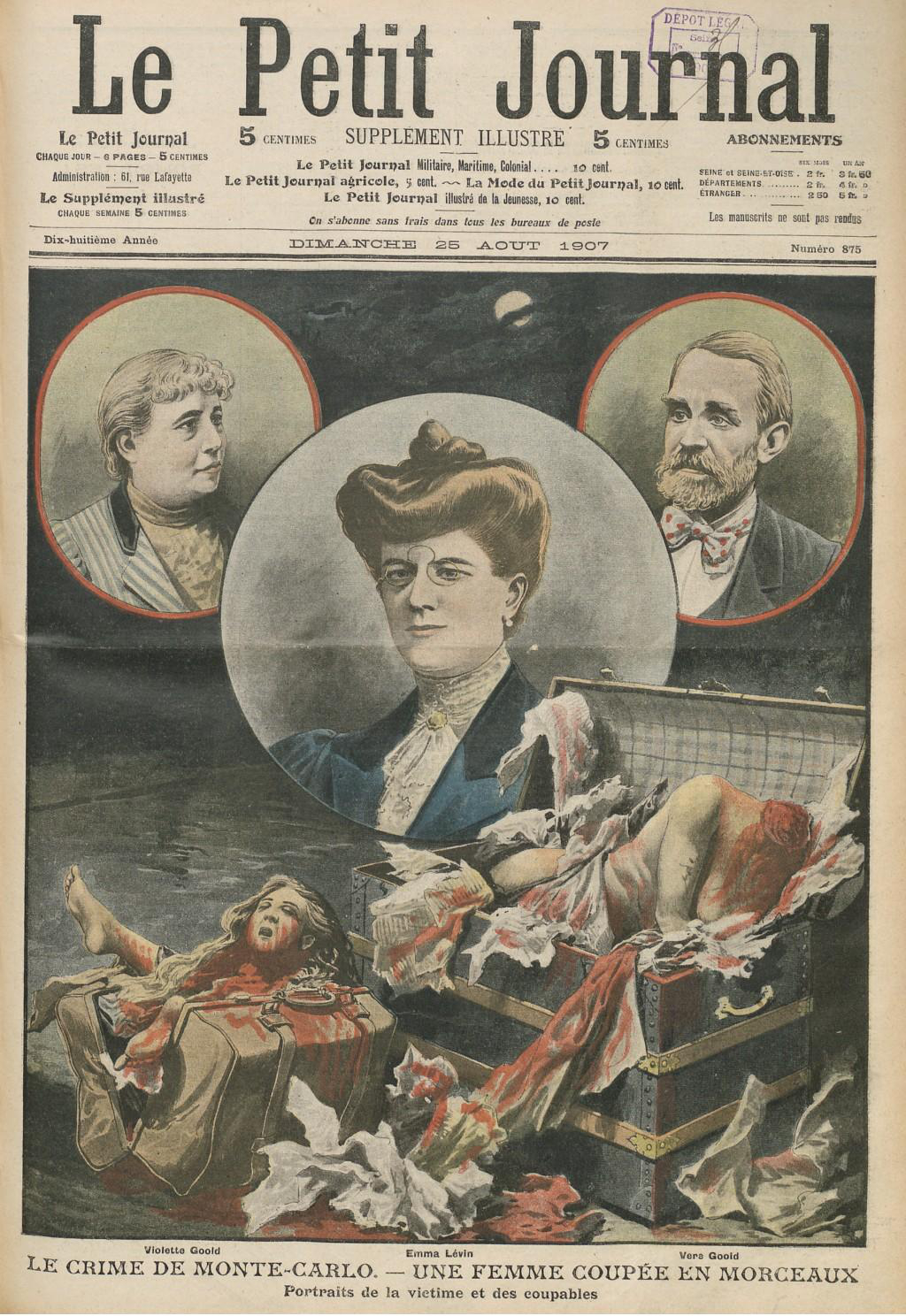
Cover of Le Petit Journal, No. 875 from 25 August 1907

The Goolds were in Marseille in a hotel (they were going to head for London). They had left a large trunk at the railway station at Marseille, and one of the clerks at the station named Pons noted it smelled of blood that was leaking out of the bottom. The trunk was traced to the Goolds, and Pons confronted them. Again, the details of the sources vary: Kingston says he wanted them to explain why it was leaking blood and come to the station to open the trunk; Gribble says that Pons sought (and got) a small bribe to stay quiet about it. Either Pons told his superiors and the police of his suspicions (the Goolds said the trunk was full of freshly slaughtered poultry) or he talked about it and the story of the trunk got out. In any case, before the Goolds could leave Marseille, they had to face the French police. The trunk was opened, and the remains of Madame Levin were found.

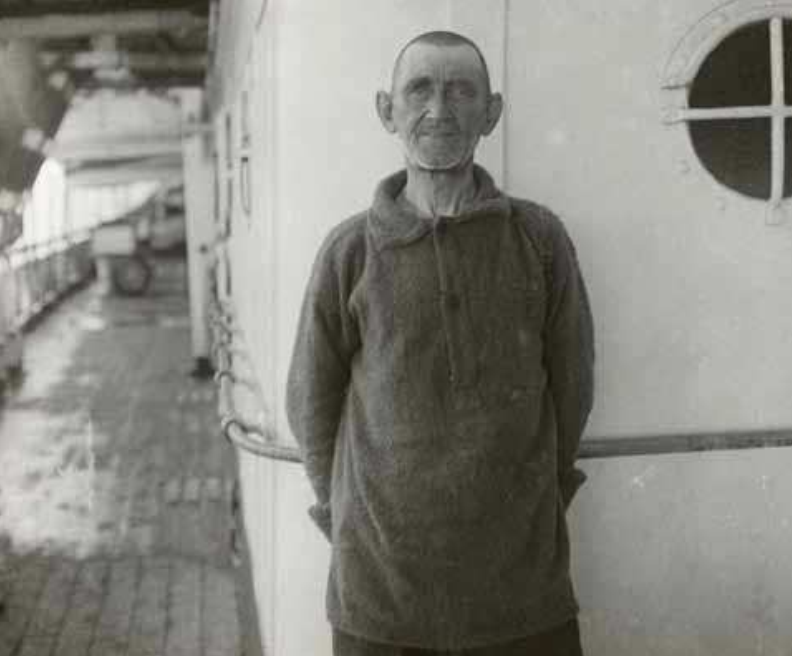
GOOLD, Vere Thomas Saint Léger, in the 18th July 1908 on the steamboat Loire on his way to devil's Island, French Guyana

Vere Goold apparently loved Marie Goold deeply. He confessed that he was the murderer. However the relative strengths of character of the two came out in the course of the trial, which attracted great attention. Marie Goold was sentenced to death, and Vere Goold was sentenced to life imprisonment on Devil's Island. However, Mrs. Goold's sentence was reduced to life imprisonment. Vere Goold died by suicide on 8 September 1909, within a year of arriving at Devil's Island. But his convict records archive states he died in 19 April 1909, location "Îles du Salut", located few kilometres north of Kourou, French Guiana. Marie Goold died of typhoid fever in a Montpellier jail in 1914.

== In popular culture ==
The murder case of Vere St. Leger Goold is the subject of a theatrical play called Love All. His life was also the subject of a 2012 docudrama on Irish station TG4 entitled Dhá Chúirt ("Two Courts"), produced by Shane Tobin and directed by Cathal Watters.

== Grand Slam finals ==
=== Singles (1 runner-up) ===
Result	Year	Championship	Surface	Opponent	Score
Loss	1879	Wimbledon	Grass	(United Kingdom) John Hartley	2–6, 4–6, 2–6

== Sources ==
- Bud Collins "Total Tennis: The Ultimate Tennis Encyclopedia" (2003 edition, ISBN 0-9731443-4-3, Sport Media Publishing Inc.) See page 771.
- Leonard Gribble "Adventures in Murder, Undertaken by Some Notorious Killers in Love" (New York: Roy Publisher, no date), p. 76–85: Chapter VIII: "Duet in Monte Carlo".
- F. Tennyson Jesse "Murder and its Motives" (Garden City, New York: Doubleday & Co., Inc. – Dolphin Books, 1924, 1958, 1965), p. 26, 65–67: Introduction: The Classification of Motives (p. 65–67 deal with the concept of "murderees").
- Charles Kingston "Remarkable Rogues: The Careers of Some Notable Criminals of Europe and America" (London: John Lane, The Bodley Head; New York, John Lane Company, 1921), p. 79–93 Chapter VI: "The Monte Carlo Trunk Murderess".
- 'Chilosa' (pseud.,) "Venusberg: the Syren city; with it's [sic] sequel – Ten years after / by Chilosà." London London: Holden & Hardingham, [1913]. pp 186 – 205 'L'Affaire Goold.'
- Michael Sheridan "Murder in Monte Carlo" Poolbeg Press Ltd (20 May 2011), ISBN 978-1842234716
