= John Hartley (tennis) =

English clergyman and tennis player

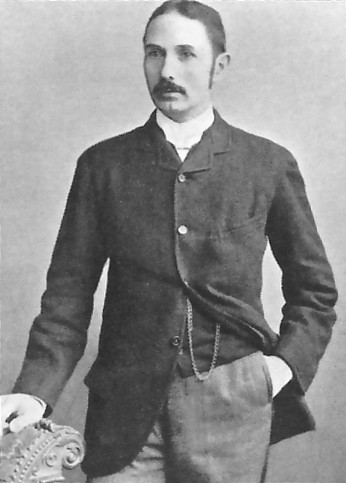
- Full name: John Thorneycroft Hartley
- Country (sports): United Kingdom of Great Britain and Ireland
- Born: 9 January 1849; Tong, England
- Died: 21 August 1935 (aged 86); Knaresborough, England
- Turned pro: 1879 (amateur)
- Retired: 1888
- Plays: Right-handed (one-handed backhand)

Singles
- Career record: 18–5
- Career titles: 3

Grand Slam singles results
- Wimbledon: W (1879, 1880)

Doubles

Grand Slam doubles results
- Wimbledon: 1R (1884)

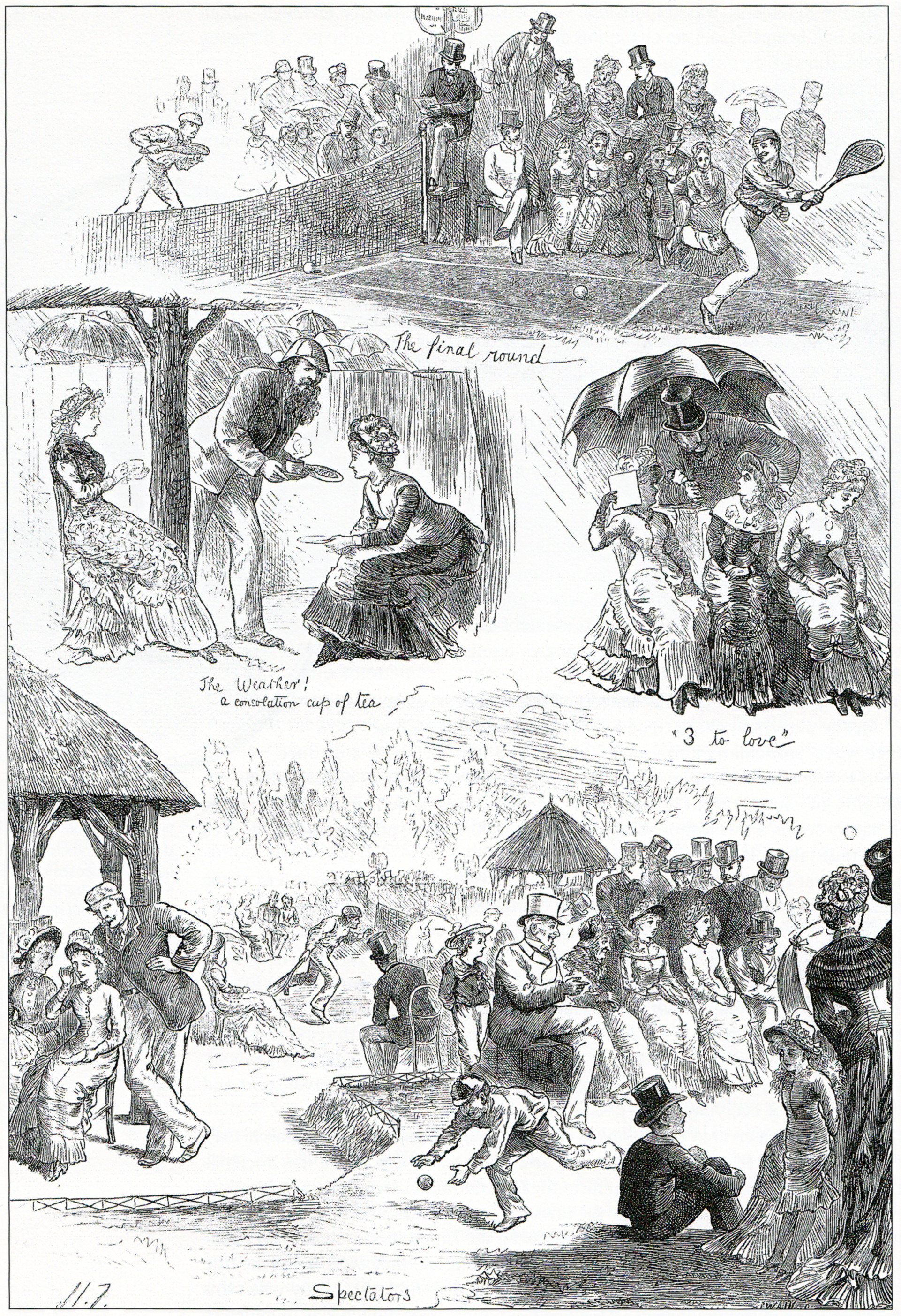
Wimbledon Lawn tennis final 15 July 1879

Rev. John Thorneycroft Hartley (9 January 1849 – 21 August 1935) was a tennis player from England, and the only clergyman to win Wimbledon.

Hartley won the 1879 Gentlemen's Singles title against Irish champion, Vere St. Leger Goold in three sets on 15 July, retaining his title the following year, 1880, by defeating Herbert Lawford in the Challenge Round in four sets.

Hartley lost in 37 minutes in the 1881 Gentlemen's Singles final, to William Renshaw. This was the shortest final on record and it was reported that Hartley was suffering from an attack of 'English cholera'. Hartley did not compete in the 1882 championships and made a final return at the 1883 championships, losing in the second round to Herbert Wilberforce in four sets.

In 1926, at the Golden Jubilee championships, Hartley was presented with a silver medal by Queen Mary, as one of 34 surviving champions.

== Early life ==
Hartley was born in 1849, second son of John Hartley (died 1884) and his wife Emma, daughter of ironmaster George Benjamin Thorneycroft of Wolverhampton. His parents were both of south Staffordshire industrial business families, his father's family owned the glass making firm of Hartley Chance & Company of Smethwick, while the Thorneycrofts founded Shrubbery Ironworks in Wolverhampton, in which his father became a partner. He grew up at Tong Castle in Shropshire, which his father leased from the Earl of Bradford in 1856.

In 1867, Hartley matriculated at Christ Church, Oxford. He graduated B.A. in 1870, and M.A. in 1874.

Hartley married Alice Margaret Lascelles Murray, daughter of William Murray, 4th Earl of Mansfield and a granddaughter of Henry Lascelles, 3rd Earl of Harewood, in 1875. They had no children.

== Career outside sport ==
Hartley was a clergyman with the Church of England, and he was ordained deacon in 1872 and priest in 1873 by the bishop of Winchester and served from 1872 to 1874 as curate of Christ Church, Southwark in south London. Hartley became the vicar of Burneston, Yorkshire, from 1874 to 1919 Rural Dean of East Catterick from 1891 to 1917 and Honorary Canon of Ripon Cathedral from 1905. He died at the age of 86 in Knaresborough, Yorkshire, and he is buried at Burneston.

== Grand Slam finals ==
=== Singles (2 titles, 1 runner-up) ===
Result	Year	Championship	Surface	Opponent	Score
Win	1879	Wimbledon	Grass	(United Kingdom of Great Britain and Ireland) Vere St. Leger Goold	6–2, 6–4, 6–2
Win	1880	Wimbledon	Grass	(United Kingdom of Great Britain and Ireland) Herbert Lawford	6–3, 6–2, 2–6, 6–3
Loss	1881	Wimbledon	Grass	(United Kingdom of Great Britain and Ireland) William Renshaw	0–6, 1–6, 1–6

== Other finals ==
=== Singles (1 titles, 1 runner-up) ===
Result	Year	Tournament	Surface	Opponent	Score
Win	1886	Chapel Allerton LTC Tournament	Grass	(United Kingdom) William Henry Mahon	2–6, 6–2, 4–6, 6–3, 6–0
Loss	1888	Victorian Championships	Asphalt	(Australia) Arthur G. H. Colquhoun	3–6, 4–6, 3–6

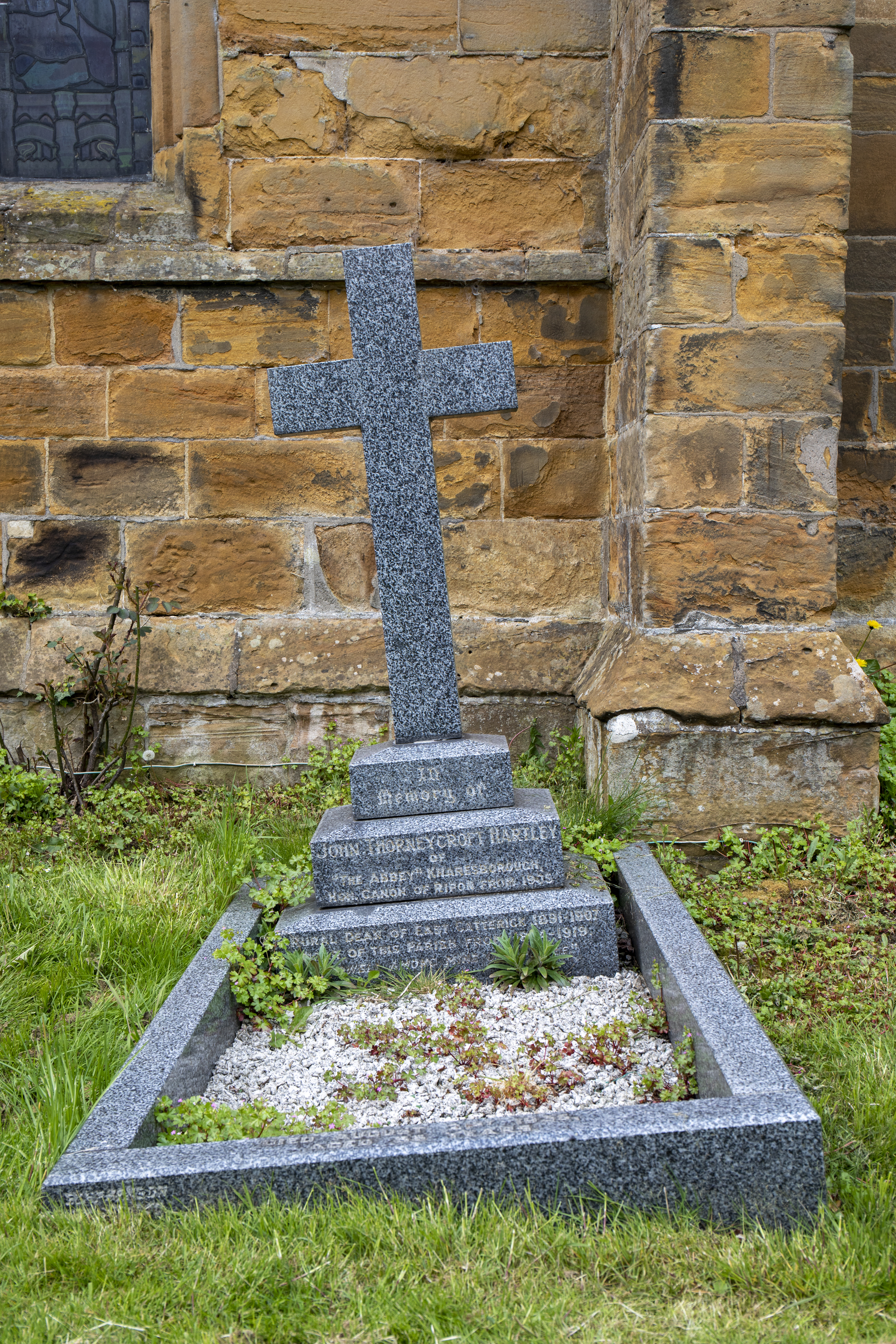
Church of St Lambert Burneston, John Hartley's grave underneath the east window
