= Herbert Lawford =

Scottish tennis player

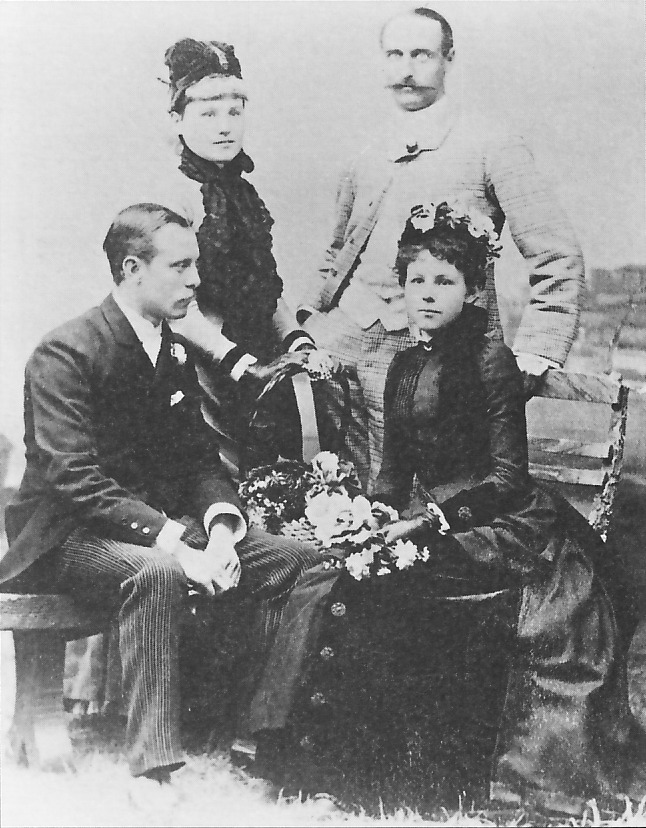
- Lawford, standing, on the right side
- Full name: Herbert Fortescue Lawford
- Country (sports): United Kingdom of Great Britain and Ireland
- Born: 15 May 1851 Bayswater, Middlesex, England
- Died: 20 April 1925 (aged 73) Dess, Aberdeenshire, Scotland
- Height: 1.80 m (5 ft 11 in)
- Turned pro: 1878 (amateur tour)
- Retired: 1890
- Plays: Right-handed (one-handed backhand)
- Int. Tennis HoF: 2006 (member page)

Singles
- Career titles: 17
- Highest ranking: No. 1 (1887, ITHF)

Grand Slam singles results
- Wimbledon: W (1887)

Grand Slam doubles results
- Wimbledon: 1R (1884)

Herbert Fortescue Lawford (15 May 1851 – 20 April 1925) was a former world No. 1 tennis player from Scotland who won the Men's Singles championship at Wimbledon in 1887, and was runner-up a record five times (shared with Arthur Gore).

== Career ==
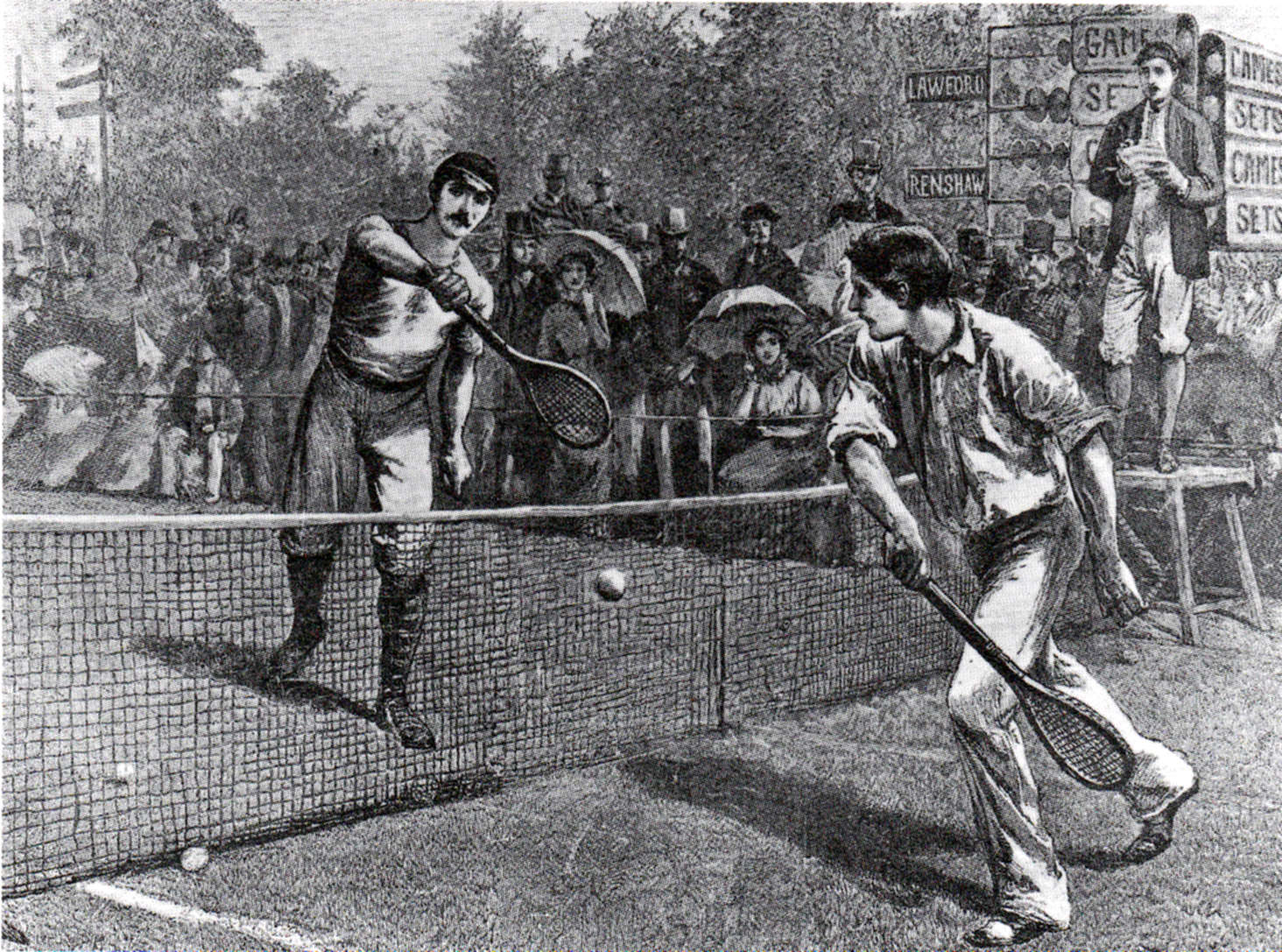
The 5th round All Comers' match between H.F. Lawford (left) and W. C. Renshaw at Wimbledon, won by Renshaw who went on to claim the All Comers' title on 12 July 1881.

In the 1887 final, the native of Bayswater defeated Ernest Renshaw (also of Great Britain) in five sets: 1–6, 6–3, 3–6, 6–4, 6–4. He reached the finals of Wimbledon in 1880, 1884–86, and 1888.

Lawford won the first major men's doubles tennis tournament, the Oxford University Men's Doubles Championship, in 1879 partnering Lestocq Robert Erskine. This event was a precursor to the Wimbledon men's doubles championship, introduced in 1884, and it was played over the best of seven sets ending in a score of 4–6, 6–4, 6–5, 6–2, 3–6, 5–6, 7–5. (Note: Some sources show the result of the final set as 10–8) In 1885 he won the singles title at the inaugural British Covered Court Championships.

== Birth of the topspin: the Lawford-stroke ==
Lawford is said to be the first person to introduce "topspin" to the game of tennis. His formidable forehand was called 'the Lawford stroke'. Lawford made a more substantial contribution in technically advancing the game. He unveiled the “Lawford forehand,” introducing topspin into the sport with that revolutionary shot. Aggressive and unwavering, he was equipped with power, speed and uncanny accuracy. He was inducted into the International Tennis Hall of Fame in 2006.

== Grand Slam finals ==
=== Singles (1 title, 5 runners-up) ===
Result	Date	Championship	Surface	Opponent	Score
Loss	1880	Wimbledon	Grass	(United Kingdom of Great Britain and Ireland) John Hartley	3–6, 2–6, 6–2, 3–6
Loss	1884	Wimbledon	Grass	(United Kingdom of Great Britain and Ireland) William Renshaw	0–6, 4–6, 7–9
Loss	1885	Wimbledon	Grass	(United Kingdom of Great Britain and Ireland) William Renshaw	5–7, 2–6, 6–4, 5–7
Loss	1886	Wimbledon	Grass	(United Kingdom of Great Britain and Ireland) William Renshaw	0–6, 7–5, 3–6, 4–6
Win	1887	Wimbledon	Grass	(United Kingdom of Great Britain and Ireland) Ernest Renshaw	1–6, 6–3, 3–6, 6–4, 6–4
Loss	1888	Wimbledon	Grass	(United Kingdom of Great Britain and Ireland) Ernest Renshaw	3–6, 5–7, 0–6

== Singles performance timeline ==
Key
W	F	SF	QF	#R	RR	Q#	DNQ	A	NH

(W) winner; (F) finalist; (SF) semifinalist; (QF) quarterfinalist; (#R) rounds 4, 3, 2, 1; (RR) round-robin stage; (Q#) qualification round; (DNQ) did not qualify; (A) absent; (NH) not held; (SR) strike rate (events won / competed); (W–L) win–loss record.

Events with a challenge round: (W_{C}) won; (CR) lost the challenge round; (F_{A}) all comers' finalist

	1877	1878	1879	1880	1881	1882	1883	1884	1885	1886	1887	1888	1889	1890	SR	W–L	Win %
Grand Slam tournaments
French	Not held														0 / 0	–	–
Wimbledon	A	SF	1R	CR	SF	SF	1R	CR	CR	CR	W	CR	SF	A	1 / 12	33–11	75.0
U.S.	Not held				A	A	A	A	A	A	A	A	A	A	0 / 0	–	–
Australian	Not held														0 / 0	–	–
Win–loss		2–1	0–1	6–1	4–1	3–1	0–1	4–1	4–1	4–1	4–0	0–1	2–1		1 / 12	33–11	75.0
