= 1878 men's tennis season =

Men's tennis season

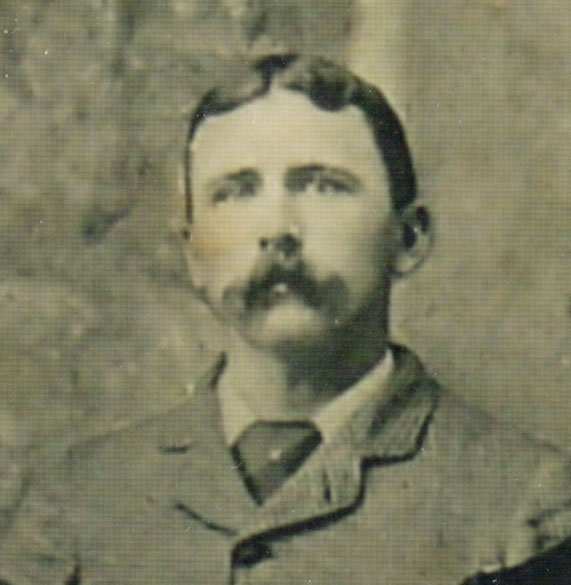
- Frank Hadow (from Hadow family collection. He won the major event of this year Wimbledon)

Details
- Duration: 21 May – 12 October
- Tournaments: 15
- Categories: Important (1); National (2); Provincial/Regional/State (1); County (1); Local (9)

Achievements (singles)
- Most titles: No outright leader
- Most finals: No outright leader

The 1878 men's tennis season was the third annual pre-open era season, with 15 tournaments staged in Great Britain and Ireland the Wimbledon Championships was won by challenger Patrick Francis Hadow defeating the defending champion Spencer Gore.

It began in April in Newcastle Emlyn, Wales and ended in October in Bournemouth, Dorset, England.

== Summary ==
This early pre open era season began in April 1878 with Teifiside Lawn Tennis Club Tournament on grass played at Newcastle Emlyn, Wales the club is still open today. In May a spring tennis tournament was held at the Bournemouth Cricket and Lawn Tennis Club on Dean Park Cricket Ground, Bournemouth, England the club held a second event in October this year.

In July the most important event of the year the 1878 Wimbledon Championships was won by the challenger Patrick Francis Hadow who beat Spencer Gore in the all comers final. In August the inaugural Scottish Championships was won by James Patten MacDougall. In September at the inaugural County Wicklow Championships the tournament was won by a Captain Hughes. In September at the South of Ireland Championships held Wicklow in Ireland, the Limerick Cup was won by Vere St. Leger Goold.

== Calendar ==
Notes 1: Challenge round: the final round of a tournament, in which the winner of a single-elimination phase faces the previous year's champion, who plays only that one match. The challenge round was used in the early history of tennis (from 1877 through 1921), in some tournaments not all.

* Indicates challenger

Notes 2:Tournaments in italics were events that were staged only once that season

Key

Important
National
Provincial/State/Regional
County
Local/other

=== January to March ===
No events

=== April ===
Date	Tournament	Winner	Finalist	Semifinalist	Quarter finalist
21 - 24 April.	Teifiside LTC Championship; Teifiside Lawn Tennis Club; Newcastle Emlyn, Wales; Grass; Singles - Doubles	(Wales) Gwyn Saunders Davies ?	(Wales) Dacre Tyler		

=== May ===
Date	Tournament	Winner	Finalist	Semifinalist	Quarter finalist
21 - 24 May.	Bournemouth CLTC Spring Tournament; Bournemouth CLTC; Dean Park Cricket Ground; Bournemouth, England; Grass; Singles - Doubles	(United Kingdom of Great Britain and Ireland) Edmond Bennet Brackenbury; 3 sets to 2	(United Kingdom of Great Britain and Ireland) Sir Hubert James Medlycott		

=== July ===
Date	Tournament	Winner	All comers' finalist	Semifinalist	Quarterfinalist
July.	All Ireland Lawn Tennis Championships; All Ireland Lawn Tennis Club; Champion Ground; Lansdowne, Dublin, Ireland. Grass; Singles	?	?		
12 July	Championship of the Esher LTC; Esher Lawn Tennis Club; Esher, Surrey, England; Grass; Singles	(United Kingdom) Clement Edward Cottrell ?	?		
9–19 July	Wimbledon Championship; London, Great Britain; Grass; Singles	(England) Patrick Francis Hadow; 6–4, 6–4, 6–4	(Scotland) Lestocq Robert Erskine	(Scotland) Herbert Lawford	(United Kingdom) Charles Gipps Hamilton (United Kingdom) Arthur Thomas Myers
9–19 July	Wimbledon Championship; London, Great Britain; Grass; Singles	Challenger round (England) Spencer Gore; 7–5, 6–1, 9–7		(Scotland) Herbert Lawford	(United Kingdom) Charles Gipps Hamilton (United Kingdom) Arthur Thomas Myers
24 July.	Staffordshire County Cricket Club Lawn Tennis Tournament. Staffordshire County Cricket Ground; Lichfield, Staffordshire, England; Grass; Singles	(United Kingdom) Jonas Henry William Gardner ?			

=== August ===
Date	Tournament	Winner	Finalist	Semifinalist	Quarter finalist
12–19 August	Scottish Championships; Edinburgh, Great Britain; Singles	(Scotland) James Patten MacDougall			

=== September ===
Date	Tournament	Winner	Finalist	Semifinalist	Quarter finalist
6 September.	Armagh Lawn Tennis Tournament; Armagh Lawn Tennis Club; Armagh, Ireland; Grass; Singles - Doubles	(Ireland) W.F. Templer ?	(Ireland) Robert Shaw Templer		
8–9 September	County Wicklow Championships; Bromley, County Wicklow, Ireland; Grass; Singles	(Ireland) Henry Evelyn Tombe ?	(United Kingdom) Captain Hughes ?	(United Kingdom) Captain Hughes (England) George Gordon Tombe	(Ireland) S. H. Butcher (Ireland) Augustine Lefroy (England) George Gordon Tombe
16–17 September	Waterford Tournament; Waterford, Ireland; Grass; Singles	(Ireland) Vere St. Leger Goold ?	(Ireland) J. M. Brown	(Ireland) Henry Joseph Gallwey (Ireland) J. C. Roberts	(Ireland) Patrick Joseph Gallwey (Ireland) William Joseph Gallwey (Ireland) Pierce Barron-Newell
23 September.	Newon Abbott Lawn Tennis Tournament; Newton Abbot Archery and Lawn Tennis Club; South Devon Cricket Club Ground; Newton Abbot, Devon, England; Grass; Singles - Doubles	(Wales) Rev. William Hughes ?	(United Kingdom) W. Sandilands		
26–30 September.	South of Ireland Championships; Limerick Cricket Club; Limerick, Ireland; Grass; Singles	(Ireland) Vere St. Leger Goold; 8–6, 8–6	(United Kingdom) William Henry Darby	(United Kingdom) William Henry Darby (United Kingdom) H H Eliott	(Ireland) Joseph Fritz James Heffernan Considine (Ireland) Robert Howden Kelly (United Kingdom) Charles Mounoir Sumner
26–30 September.	South of Ireland Championships; Limerick Cricket Club; Limerick, Ireland; Grass; Singles	(Ireland) Heffernan Considine (Ireland) Helena Considine; 6-3, 6–5, 6-2	(Ireland) Robert Howden Kelly (Ireland) Miss Lumley	(United Kingdom) William Henry Darby (United Kingdom) H H Eliott	(Ireland) Joseph Fritz James Heffernan Considine (Ireland) Robert Howden Kelly (United Kingdom) Charles Mounoir Sumner

=== October ===
Date	Tournament	Winner	Finalist	Semifinalist	Quarter finalist
October.	Moy and Charlemont LTC Tournament; Moy and Charlemont Croquet and Lawn Tennis Club; Moy, County Tyrone, Northern Ireland; Singles	(Ireland) Robert Baron Templer ?	(Ireland) S. Phipson	(Ireland) Robert Baron Templer (Ireland) H. Ringwood	(Ireland) Archibald Alexander Hamilton (Ireland) H. Ringwood (Ireland) Robert Shaw Templer
7–12 October	Dublin University Championships; Dublin, Ireland; Hard (Asphalt); Singles	(Ireland) James Jackson Sherrard ?	(Ireland) William Morgan Jellett	(Ireland) Henry James Daly ? (Ireland) William Morgan Jellett	(Ireland) Henry James Daly (Ireland) Richard Manders (Ireland) George Henry Shannon
10 October.	Bournemouth CLTC Autumn Tournament; Bournemouth CLTC; Dean Park Cricket Ground; Bournemouth, England; Grass; Singles - Doubles	(United Kingdom of Great Britain and Ireland) Hubert James Medlycott ?	(United Kingdom of Great Britain and Ireland)		

=== November to December ===
No events

== Tournament winners ==
major tournaments in bold

- (England) Patrick Francis Hadow – **Wimbledon Championships**-(1)
- (Ireland) W.F. Templer, Armagh, (1)
- (United Kingdom of Great Britain and Ireland) Edmond Bennet Brackenbury, Bournemouth I, (1)
- (United Kingdom of Great Britain and Ireland) Sir Hubert James Medlycott, Bournemouth II, (1)
- (Ireland) Henry Evelyn Tombe, Bromley, (1)
- (Ireland) James Jackson Sherrard, Dublin II, (1)
- (Scotland) James Patten MacDougall, Edinburgh, (1)
- (United Kingdom) Clement Edward Cottrell, Esher, (1)
- (United Kingdom) Jonas Henry William Gardner–, Lichfield, (1)
- (Ireland) William Henry Darby, Limerick, (1)
- (Ireland) Robert Baron Templer, Moy, (1)
- (Wales) Gwyn Saunders, Newcastle Emlyn, (1)
- (Wales) William Hughes, Newton Abbott, (1)
- (Ireland) Vere St. Leger Goold, Waterford, (1)

== See also ==
- 1878 women's tennis season
- 1878 Tennis Season
- 1878 in sports

== Sources ==
- A Social History of Tennis in Britain: Lake, Robert J. (2014), Volume 5 of Routledge Research in Sports History. Routledge, UK, ISBN 9781134445578.
- Ayre's Lawn Tennis Almanack And Tournament Guide, 1908 to 1938, A. Wallis Myers.
- British Lawn Tennis and Squash Magazine, 1948 to 1967, British Lawn Tennis Ltd, UK.
- Dunlop Lawn Tennis Almanack And Tournament Guide, G.P. Hughes, 1939 to 1958, Dunlop Sports Co. Ltd, UK
- Lawn tennis and Badminton Magazine, 1906 to 1973, UK.
- Lowe's Lawn Tennis Annuals and Compendia, Lowe, Sir F. Gordon, Eyre & Spottiswoode
- Spalding's Lawn Tennis Annuals from 1885 to 1922, American Sports Pub. Co, USA.
- Sports Around the World: History, Culture, and Practice, Nauright John and Parrish Charles, (2012), ABC-CLIO, Santa Barbara, Cal, USA, ISBN 1598843001.
- The Concise History of Tennis, Mazak Karoly, (2010), 6th Edition, 2015.
- Tennis; A Cultural History, Gillmeister Heiner, (1997), Leicester University Press, Leicester, UK.
- The Tennis Book, edited by Michael Bartlett and Bob Gillen, Arbor House, New York, 1981 ISBN 0-87795-344-9
- The World of Tennis Annuals, Barrett John, 1970 to 2001.
- Total Tennis:The Ultimate Tennis Encyclopedia, by Bud Collins, Sport Classic Books, Toronto, Canada, ISBN 0-9731443-4-3
- Wright & Ditson Officially Adopted Lawn Tennis Guide's 1890 to 1920 Wright & Ditsons Publishers, Boston, Mass, USA.
- http://www.tennisarchives.com/
- https://thetennisbase.com/
