= 1877 men's tennis season =

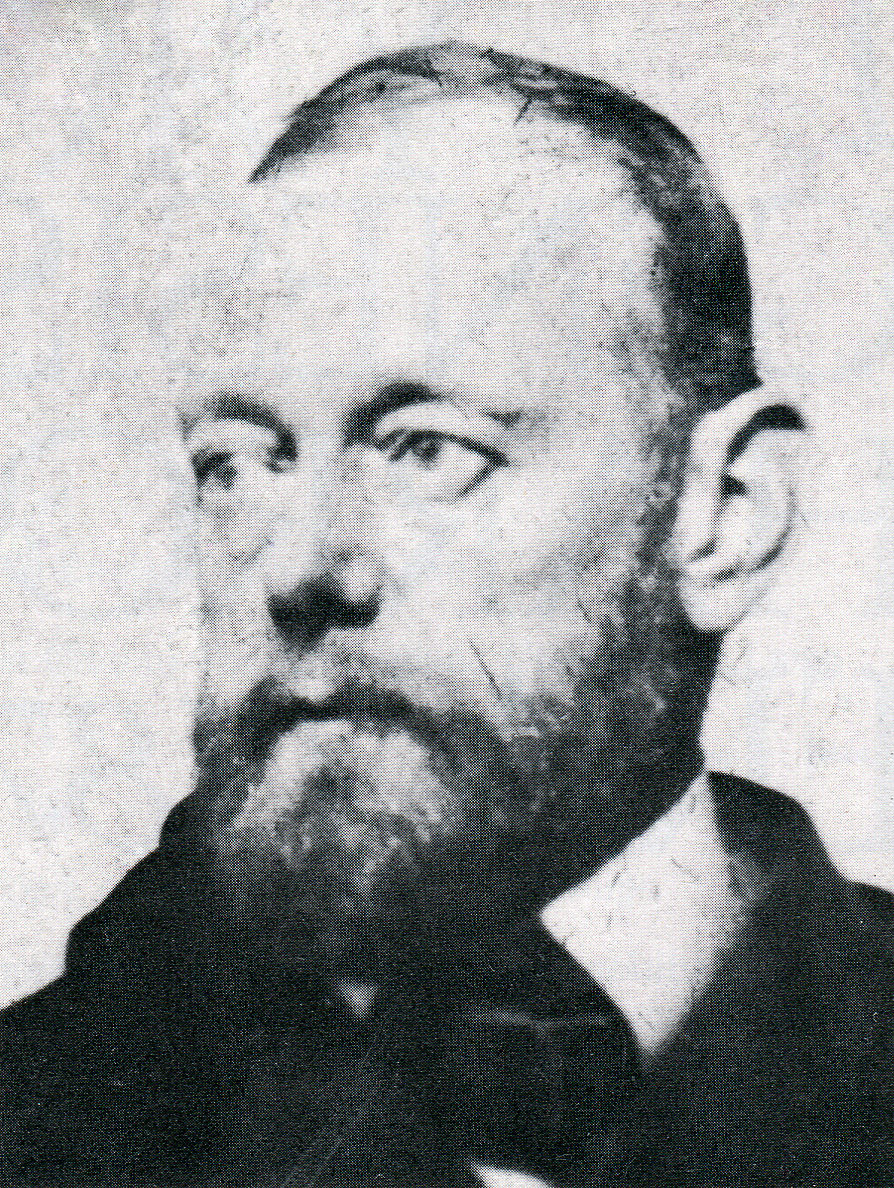
- English tennis player Spencer Gore (1850-1906), first Wimbledon Champion (1877) 19 April 1906.

Details
- Duration: 19 July – 9 October
- Tournaments: 5
- Categories: Important (1); National (1); Regular (3)

Achievements (singles)
- Most titles: No outright leader
- Most finals: No outright leader

The 1877 men's tennis season was composed of 5 tournaments. Before the birth of Open Era (tennis), most tournaments were reserved for amateur athletes. In 1874 British Major Walter Clopton Wingfield patented with the House of London Crafts the invention of a new game, which consisted of a shaped field hourglass, divided in the middle by a suspended net. The game was packaged in a box containing some balls, four paddles, the net components and the signs to mark the field. The game was based on the rules of the old real tennis and, at the suggestion of Arthur Balfour, was called lawn-tennis. The official date of birth of the court would be February 23, 1874. In 1877 all were amateur tournaments, among them was the first 1877 Wimbledon Championship, the inaugural event was held from 9 to 19 July and saw as the inaugural winner Spencer Gore. The tournament would remain for a period of 35 years the sole major tennis tournament in the world until the International Lawn Tennis Federation introduces its three World championship series events in 1913 that continue until 1923, when the U.S. Lawn Tennis Association (f. 1881) only agrees to join the ILTF on the basis of two compromises: the title 'World Championships' would be abolished and wording would be 'for ever in the English language'. Wimbledon would still retain its prestigious and historical status, and become one of the four Grand Slam tennis events from 1924.

Whilst Wimbledon was the most prominent event of this inaugural new sport season in Ireland two other tournaments were also staged, one taking place in Waterford and the other was University of Dublin Lawn Tennis Championships.

== Calendar ==
Notes 1: Challenge Round: the final round of a tournament, in which the winner of a single-elimination phase faces the previous year's champion, who plays only that one match. The challenge round was used in the early history of tennis (from 1877 through 1921), in some tournaments not all.

* Indicates challenger

Notes 2:Tournaments in italics were events that were staged only once that season

=== Key ===
Important.
National
Provincial/Regional/State
County
Regular

=== January to June ===
No events

=== July ===
Date	Tournament	Winner	Finalist	Semifinalist	Quarter finalist
July.	All Ireland Lawn Tennis Championships; All Ireland Lawn Tennis Club; Champion Ground; Lansdowne, Dublin, Ireland. Grass; Singles				
12 July	Championship of the Esher LTC; Esher Lawn Tennis Club; Esher, Surrey, England; Grass; Singles	(United Kingdom) Clement Edward Cottrell ?			
19 July	Wimbledon Championships; All England Lawn Tennis Club; Wimbledon, Middlesex, England; Grass; Singles	(England) Spencer Gore; 6–1, 6–2, 6–4	(United Kingdom) William Marshall	(England) Charles Gilbert Heathcote; Bye	(United Kingdom) F.N. Langham (United Kingdom) Julian Marshall (Scotland) Lestocq Robert Erskine; Bye

=== August ===
No events

=== September ===
Date	Tournament	Winner	Finalist	Semifinalist	Quarter finalist
3 September	Waterford Annual Lawn Tennis Tournament; Waterford, Ireland; Grass; Singles	(Ireland) Vere St. Leger Goold; 6-2, 6–3, 6-4	(Ireland) H. H. Elliott	(Ireland) Vere St. Leger Goold (Ireland) J. C. Roberts	(Ireland) H. H. Elliott (Ireland) John M. Brown (Ireland) Mr. Moore

=== October ===
Date	Tournament	Winner	Finalist	Semifinalist	Quarter finalist
8 October	Dublin University Championships; Dublin, Ireland; Hard (Asphalt); Singles	(Ireland) Richard Manders ?	(Ireland) George Henry Shannon	(Ireland) George Henry Shannon (Ireland) Charles Dubedat	(Ireland) Robert Edward Shaw

=== November to December ===
No events

== Tournament winners ==
major tournaments in bold

- (England) Spencer Gore–**Wimbledon Championships**, (1)
- (Ireland) Richard Manders, Dublin, (1)
- (England) Clement Edward Cottrell, Esher, (1)
- (Ireland) Vere St. Leger Goold, Waterford, (1)

== See also ==
- 1877 in Tennis
- 1877 in sports

== Sources ==
- A Social History of Tennis in Britain: Lake, Robert J. (2014), Volume 5 of Routledge Research in Sports History. Routledge, UK, ISBN 9781134445578.
- Ayre's Lawn Tennis Almanack And Tournament Guide, 1908 to 1938, A. Wallis Myers.
- British Lawn Tennis and Squash Magazine, 1948 to 1967, British Lawn Tennis Ltd, UK.
- Dunlop Lawn Tennis Almanack And Tournament Guide, G.P. Hughes, 1939 to 1958, Dunlop Sports Co. Ltd, UK
- Lawn tennis and Badminton Magazine, 1906 to 1973, UK.
- Lowe's Lawn Tennis Annuals and Compendia, Lowe, Sir F. Gordon, Eyre & Spottiswoode
- Spalding's Lawn Tennis Annuals from 1885 to 1922, American Sports Pub. Co, USA.
- Sports Around the World: History, Culture, and Practice, Nauright John and Parrish Charles, (2012), ABC-CLIO, Santa Barbara, Cal, US, ISBN 1598843001.
- Tennis; A Cultural History, Gillmeister Heiner, (1997), Leicester University Press, Leicester, UK.
- The Tennis Book, edited by Michael Bartlett and Bob Gillen, Arbor House, New York, 1981 ISBN 0-87795-344-9
- The World of Tennis Annuals, Barrett John, 1970 to 2001.
- Total Tennis:The Ultimate Tennis Encyclopedia, by Bud Collins, Sport Classic Books, Toronto, Canada, ISBN 0-9731443-4-3
- Wright & Ditson Officially Adopted Lawn Tennis Guide's 1890 to 1920 Wright & Ditsons Publishers, Boston, Mass, USA.
- https://app.thetennisbase.com/Men's 1877 season
