= 1878 in sports =

1878 in sports describes the year's events in world sport.

== Athletics ==
- USA Outdoor Track and Field Championships

== American football ==
College championship

- College football national championship – Princeton Tigers

Events

- Inaugural match between Phillips Andover and Phillips Exeter, believed to be the sport's oldest high school rivalry

== Association football ==
England

- FA Cup final – The Wanderers 1–0 Royal Engineers at The Oval. The Wanderers become the first team to complete a hat trick of FA Cup wins and it is their fifth (and final) win in total.
- Accrington FC, known as "Th' Owd Reds", is founded in 1878 by the town cricket club and plays at Thorneyholme Road, which remains the home of Accrington Cricket Club to the present. Accrington FC, which folds in 1896, is not the same club as Accrington Stanley, which begins in 1891 as Stanley Villa (i.e., founded by residents of Stanley Street in Accrington). In 1893, Stanley Villa decides to adopt the town's name and becomes Accrington Stanley.
- Everton F.C. founded as St Domingo's, a chapel team with a pitch on Stanley Park in Liverpool. The present name is adopted the following year at a pub meeting.
- Ipswich Town founded and known as Ipswich A.F.C. until 1888 when it merges with Ipswich Rugby Club to form Ipswich Town Football Club
- Manchester United founded as Newton Heath Cricket & Football Club by employees of the Lancashire & Yorkshire Railway.
- Stoke Ramblers merges with Stoke Victoria Cricket Club, and becomes Stoke Football Club (in 1928, it is renamed Stoke City).
- West Bromwich Albion founded as West Bromwich Strollers by workers at Salter's Spring Works in West Bromwich. They become Albion in 1879.

Scotland

- Scottish Cup final – Vale of Leven 1–0 Third Lanark

== Australian Rules Football ==
- Victorian Football Association premiers - Geelong
- SANFL premiers - Norwood

== Baseball ==
National championship

- National League champions – Boston Red Caps

Events

- Harry Wright leads Boston Red Caps to another pennant, once again with brother George Wright at shortstop and Andy Leonard in the outfield. This is six wins in seven years for them all, plus their membership of the 1869–70 Cincinnati Red Stockings.

== Boxing ==
Events

- Harry Buermeyer of the New York Athletic Club became the first official amateur heavyweight boxing champion in America, while recording the first knockout at Madison Square Garden by beating George Lee of the Union Athletic Club of Boston.
- A number of fights scheduled to involve one or two of Joe Goss, Paddy Ryan and John J. Dwyer are all cancelled. Goss retains his American Championship title in his weight division.

== Cricket ==
Events

- Australia makes the inaugural first-class tour of England by an overseas team. The tour is a great success but includes no Test matches.
- 25–27 July — Lancashire versus Gloucestershire at Old Trafford is the first time that Gloucestershire visits Old Trafford and it causes ground records to be established. The match is drawn after rain interruptions but it earns a special place because it ultimately forms the nostalgic inspiration for the famous poem At Lord's by Francis Thompson.
- 31 July — official formation of Northamptonshire County Cricket Club at a meeting in the George Hotel, Kettering.

England

- Champion County – Middlesex and Nottinghamshire shared title
- Most runs – George Ulyett 1,270 @ 27.02 (HS 109)
- Most wickets – Alfred Shaw 201 @ 10.95 (BB 7–41)

Australia

- Most runs – Nat Thomson 101 @ 33.66 (HS 73)
- Most wickets – Edwin Evans 18 @ 10.72 (BB 6–57)

== Golf ==
Major tournaments

- British Open – Jamie Anderson

== Horse racing ==
England

- Grand National – Shifnal
- 1,000 Guineas Stakes – Pilgrimage
- 2,000 Guineas Stakes – Pilgrimage
- The Derby – Sefton
- The Oaks – Jannette
- St. Leger Stakes – Jannette

Australia

- Melbourne Cup – Calamia

Canada

- Queen's Plate – King George

Ireland

- Irish Grand National – Juggler
- Irish Derby Stakes – Madame duBarry

USA

- Kentucky Derby – Day Star
- Preakness Stakes – Duke of Magenta
- Belmont Stakes – Duke of Magenta

== Ice hockey ==
Events

- The Quebec Hockey Club is founded.

== Rowing ==
The Boat Race

- 13 April — Oxford wins the 35th Oxford and Cambridge Boat Race

Other events

- The Harvard–Yale Regatta moves to its permanent location on the Thames River in New London.

== Rugby football ==
Events

- Formation of Leigh RLFC and London Scottish

== Skiing ==
- On the occasion of the Exposition Universelle in Paris, the Norwegian pavilion presents a display of skis. This ancestral means of locomotion draws the attention of visitors who buy many of them. Henry Duhamel experiments with a pair at Chamrousse in the Alps.

== Tennis ==
England

- Wimbledon Men's Singles Championship – Frank Hadow (GB) defeated Spencer Gore (GB) 7–5 6–1 9–7

World

- The 2nd pre-open era 1878 Men's Tennis tour gets underway 6 tournaments are staged this year between 9 July – 12 October 1878.
