= 1878 in tennis =

This page covers all the important events in the sport of tennis in 1878. It provides the results of notable tournaments throughout the year on both the men's and women's ILTF tennis circuits.

== Australian Open ==
No event.

== French Open ==
Not a Grand Slam event.

== Wimbledon ==
Category	Champion(s)	Finalist(s)	Score
Final	(United Kingdom) Frank Hadow	(United Kingdom) Spencer Gore	7–5, 6–1, 9–7 (Note: This was Hadow's first and only Major.)
All Comers' Final	(United Kingdom) Frank Hadow	(United Kingdom) Robert Erskine	6–4, 6–4, 6–4

== US Open ==
No event.
