= 1877 women's tennis season =

1877 Women's Tennis Season
Details
- Duration: April 1877 – December 1877
- Edition: 2nd
- Tournaments: 3
- Categories: National (1); Regional (1); Regular (1)

Achievements (singles)
- Most titles: (Ireland) Frances Gallwey (Ireland) Miss Smith (1)
- Most finals: (Ireland) Frances Gallwey (Ireland) Miss Smith (1)

The 1877 Women's Tennis Season was mainly composed of national, regional, local amateur tournaments. This year 3 tennis events were staged in Dublin, Limerick and Waterford, Ireland between April and September 1877

== Season summary ==
The women's amateur tennis seasons covers a period of thirty five years from 1876 to 1912. During this period there was no single international organization responsible for overseeing tennis. At the very start in tennis history lawn tennis clubs themselves organized events and some like the All England Lawn Tennis and Croquet Club in England (f.1877) and the Fitzwilliam Lawn Tennis Club, Ireland (f.1879) generally oversaw tennis in their respective countries.

This would later change when tennis players started (those that could) traveled the world to compete in events organized by individual national lawn tennis associations (NLTA)'s the oldest of which then was the United States Lawn Tennis Association (f. 1881). In certain countries that did not establish a national association until later, had provincial, regional or state lawn tennis associations overseeing tournaments in a province, region or state within a country, such as the Northern Lawn Tennis Association in Manchester, England (f.1880), had responsibility for coordinating tournaments staged by clubs in the North of England region. In Australia the Victorian Lawn Tennis Association (f.1904) organised tournaments in the state of Victoria, Australia.

In 1877 three tournaments for women were staged all of them in Ireland. At the second edition of South of Ireland Championships in Limerick the singles event was won by a Miss Smith. This year saw the first edition of the Waterford Lawn Tennis Tournament held at Waterford Cricket & Lawn Tennis Club, Rocklands, Waterford, County Waterford the singles title was won by Frances Gallwey.

This year was the first staging of the Wimbledon Championships the world's first major tennis tournament, however it was an all men's event, no women's events were staged.

In 1913 the International Lawn Tennis Federation was created, that consisted of national member associations. The ILTF through its associated members then became responsible for supervising women's tour events.

== Season results ==
Notes 1: Challenge Round: the final round of a tournament, in which the winner of a single-elimination phase faces the previous year's champion, who plays only that one match. The challenge round was used in the early history of tennis (from 1877 through 1921), in some tournaments not all.

* Indicates challenger

Notes 2:Tournaments in italics were events that were staged only once that season

Key

Main events
National events
Provincial/Regional/State events
County events
Regular events

=== January to March ===
No events

=== April/May ===
Ended	Tournament	Winner	Finalist	Semi Finalist	Quarter Finalist
May 6.	All Ireland Lawn Tennis Championships; Dublin, Ireland; Grass; Singles	(Ireland) ? d.	(Ireland) ?		

=== June–July ===
No events

=== August ===
Ended	Tournament	Winner	Finalist	Semi Finalist	Quarter Finalist
Aug 4.	South of Ireland Championships; Limerick, Ireland; Outdoor; Grass; Singles	(Ireland) Miss Smith. def	(Ireland) ?		

=== September ===
Ended	Tournament	Winner	Finalist	Semi Finalist	Quarter Finalist
Sep 16.	Waterford Lawn Tennis Tournament; Waterford CLTC; Rocklands, Waterford, Ireland; Outdoor; Grass; Singles	(Ireland) Frances Gallwey def	(Ireland) Miss Roberts	(Ireland) A. Gallwey (Ireland) M. Radcliffe	(Ireland) Mrs Bucknell (Ireland) Miss McCreery (Ireland) Miss O'Donnell (Ireland) Miss Radcliffe
Sep 16.	Waterford Lawn Tennis Tournament; Waterford CLTC; Rocklands, Waterford, Ireland; Outdoor; Grass; Singles	(Ireland) Miss Radcliffe ** (Ireland) Henry Joseph Gallwey ** def	(Ireland) Frances Gallwey (Ireland) Benjamin E. Bunbury	(Ireland) A. Gallwey (Ireland) M. Radcliffe	(Ireland) Mrs Bucknell (Ireland) Miss McCreery (Ireland) Miss O'Donnell (Ireland) Miss Radcliffe

=== November to December ===
No events

== Tournament winners ==
=== Singles ===
This is list of winners sorted by number of singles titles

- (Ireland) ?–Dublin–(1)
- (Ireland) Miss Smith (1) Limerick
- (Ireland) Frances Gallwey (1) Waterford

=== Mixed doubles ===
This is list of winners sorted by number of mix doubles titles

- (Ireland) Miss Radcliffe & (Ireland) Henry Joseph Gallwey (1) Waterford
