= 1876 men's tennis season =

Details
- Duration: 22 July – 15 September
- Tournaments: 2
- Categories: National (1); Provincial/Regional/State (1)

Achievements (singles)
- Most titles: (England) William Henry Darby (1) (Ireland) W. Peebles (1)

The 1876 men's tennis season consisted of just 2 tournaments. It began on 22 July in Dublin, Ireland and ended on 15 September in Limerick, Ireland.

== Summary of season ==
Before the birth of Open Era, most tournaments were reserved for amateur athletes. In 1874 British major Walter Clopton Wingfield patented the invention of a new game, which consists of an hourglass shaped field, divided in the middle by a suspended net. The game was packaged in a box containing some balls, four paddles, the network and the signs to mark the field. The game was based on the rules of the old real tennis and, at the suggestion of Arthur Balfour, was called lawn-tennis. The official date of birth would be February 23, 1874.

This year the world's first two official tennis tournaments for men are held, one the All Ireland Lawn Tennis Championships organised by the All Ireland Lawn Tennis Club and held at the Champion Ground, Lansdowne, Dublin. The other the South of Ireland Championships in Limerick, County Limerick. The following year the tournament would staged the first Open championships in Ireland took place in August 1877, the same year as the first All-England championships of Wimbledon. The event was not held in Dublin but at the Limerick Lawn Tennis Club, putting Limerick in a premier position on the tennis map predating Fitzwilliam Lawn Tennis Club by two years.

== Calendar ==
Notes 1: Challenge Round: the final round of a tournament, in which the winner of a single-elimination phase faces the previous year's champion, who plays only that one match. The challenge round was used in the early history of tennis (from 1877 through 1921), in some tournaments not all.

* Indicates challenger

Key

Important.
National
Provincial/State/Regional
County
Local

=== January to June ===
No events

=== July ===
Date	Tournament	Winner	Finalist	Semifinalist	Quarter finalist
22 July.	All Ireland Lawn Tennis Championships; All Ireland Lawn Tennis Club; Champion Ground; Lansdowne, Dublin, Ireland. Grass; Singles	(Ireland) W. Peebles ?	(Ireland) J. Forster		

=== August ===
No events

=== September ===
Date	Tournament	Winner	Finalist	Semifinalist	Quarter finalist
11 - 15 September.	South of Ireland Championships; Limerick, County Limerick, Ireland; Grass; Singles	(England) William Henry Darby; 11-3	(Ireland) Mr. W. Bruce		

=== November to December ===
No events

== Tournament winners ==
- (Ireland) W. Peebles–Dublin–(1)
- (England) William Henry Darby–Limerick–(1)

== Tournaments ==
- All Ireland Lawn Tennis Championships
- South of Ireland Championships
