= Bermuda Tournament =

Defunct tennis tournament
- Founded: 1876; 150 years ago
- Abolished: 1876; 150 years ago
- Location: Hamilton, Bermuda
- Surface: Grass

The Bermuda Tournament was one of earliest known women's grass court tennis event's staged only one time in September 1876. It was held in Hamilton, Bermuda.

== History ==
In 1924 Mary G. Gray gave an interview for American Lawn Tennis, then a book published by the United States Lawn Tennis Association in which she spoke of a tennis tournament she played in at Hamilton, Bermuda, the story was subsequently published under the chapter heading 'A Bermuda Tournament in 1876' On 15 September 1924. On 3 September 1876 a women's tennis tournament was held in Hamilton, Bermuda, that was won by Mary G. Gray who defeated Rose Key.

Earlier in 1876 in Ireland an All Ireland Lawn Tennis Championships, organised by the Irish Champion Athletic Club, Dublin was also held between the 17 and 22 July that year. In 1879 the first Bermuda Open Tennis Championships were held.

== Result ==
Year	Winner	Runner-up	Score
1876.	(Bermuda) Mary G Gray	(Bermuda) Rose Key	?

== See also ==
- 1876 in Women's tennis
- All Ireland Lawn Tennis Championships
- Bermuda International Championships
