= 1876 women's tennis season =

1876 Women's Tennis Season
Details
- Duration: April–May 1876 – December 1876
- Edition: 1st
- Tournaments: 2
- Categories: National (1); Regular (1)

Achievements (singles)
- Most titles: (Ireland) Miss W Casey (Bermuda) Mary G Gray (1)
- Most finals: (Ireland) Miss W Casey (Bermuda) Mary G Gray (1)

1876 Women's Tennis Season was mainly composed of national and local amateur tournaments. This year two tennis events were staged in Dublin, Ireland and Hamilton, Bermuda between April and December 1876.

== History ==
Before the birth of Open Era, most tournaments were reserved for amateur athletes. In 1874 the British Major Walter Clopton Wingfield he patented the House of London Crafts the invention of a new game, which consists of a shaped field hourglass, divided in the middle by a net suspended. The game was packaged in a box containing some balls, four paddles, the network and the signs to mark the field. The game was based on the rules of the old real tennis and, at the suggestion of Arthur Balfour, was called lawn-tennis. The official date of birth of the court would be February 23, 1874.

The women's amateur tennis seasons covers a period of thirty five years from 1876 to 1912. During this period there was no single international organization responsible for overseeing tennis. At the very start in tennis history lawn tennis clubs themselves organized events and some like the All England Lawn Tennis and Croquet Club in England (f.1877) and the Fitzwilliam Lawn Tennis Club, Ireland (f.1879) generally oversaw tennis in their respective countries.

This would later change when tennis players started (those that could) traveled the world to compete in events organized by individual national lawn tennis associations (NLTA)'s the oldest of which then was the United States Lawn Tennis Association (f. 1881). In certain countries that did not establish a national association until later, had provincial, regional or state lawn tennis associations overseeing tournaments in a province, region or state within a country, such as the Northern Lawn Tennis Association in Manchester, England (f.1880), had responsibility for coordinating tournaments staged by clubs in the North of England region. In Australia the Victorian Lawn Tennis Association (f.1904) organised tournaments in the state of Victoria, Australia.

In 1876 the very first tournaments for women were organised in Ireland and Bermuda. In Ireland an All Ireland Lawn Tennis Championships organised by the Irish Champion Athletic Club, Dublin were held between 17 and 22 July, that was won by a Miss W Casey who defeated a Miss Vance. In September 1876 a second tournament for women was staged at Hamilton. Bermuda that was won by Mary G Gray.

This year in Hobart, Tasmania, Australia a local sports goods supply company imported tennis equipment from England, tennis courts were laid and local competitions held for the first time. In 1876 in the United States tennis was first played in Boston Massachusetts on a private tennis court built by Hollis Hunnewell and Nathaniel Thayer. In Canada the Toronto Lawn Tennis Club was established.

In 1913 the International Lawn Tennis Federation was created, that consisted of national member associations. The ILTF through its associated members then became responsible for supervising a global women's tour.

== Season results ==
Notes 1: Challenge Round: the final round of a tournament, in which the winner of a single-elimination phase faces the previous year's champion, who plays only that one match. The challenge round was used in the early history of tennis (from 1877 through 1921), in some tournaments not all.

* Indicates challenger

Notes 2:Tournaments in italics were events that were staged only once that season

Key

Main
National
Provincial/Regional/State
County
Regular

=== January to June ===
No events

=== July ===
Ended	Tournament	Winner	Finalist	Semi Finalist	Quarter Finalist
Jul 7.	All Ireland Lawn Tennis Championships; All Ireland LTC; Dublin, Ireland; Grass; Singles	(Ireland) Miss W Casey def.	(Ireland) Miss Vance		

=== August ===
No events

=== September ===
Ended	Tournament	Winner	Finalist	Semi Finalist	Quarter Finalist
Sep 3.	Bermuda Tournament; Hamilton, Bermuda; Grass; Singles	(Bermuda) Mary G Gray def.	(Bermuda) Rose Key		

=== November to December ===
No events

== Tournament winners ==
=== Singles ===
This is list of winners sorted by number of singles titles

- (Ireland) Miss W Casey (1) Dublin
- (Bermuda) Mary G Gray (1) Hamilton
