= 1878 Wimbledon Championship =

- Date: 15 – 20 July
- Edition: 2nd
- Category: Grand Slam
- Surface: Grass
- Location: Worple Road; SW19, Wimbledon, London, United Kingdom
- Venue: All England Croquet and Lawn Tennis Club

Champions

Singles
- (United Kingdom) Frank Hadow
- Wimbledon Championship

The 1878 Wimbledon Championships took place on the outdoor grass courts at the All England Lawn Tennis and Croquet Club in Wimbledon, London, United Kingdom. The tournament ran from 15 July until 20 July. It was the 2nd staging of the Wimbledon Championships, and the first Grand Slam tennis event of 1878. There were 34 competitors, excluding Spencer Gore who as champion was not required to participate until the best of the challengers had won the All comers' final. The winner of the All Comers' final was Frank Hadow, a planter from Ceylon who was on leave in Britain. He defeated Robert Erskine, a friend of the family who had enticed him to participate in the championship, in straight sets 6–4, 6–4, 6–4. On 18 July 1878 Hadow defeated reigning champion Spencer Gore in three sets, 7–5, 6–1, 9–7 before a crowd of about 700 spectators. Hadow effectively introduced the tactic of lobbing to counter Gore's volleying game.

The height of the net was reduced from 5 feet (1.5 m) at the posts and 3 feet 3 inches (0.99 m) in the middle to 4 feet 9 inches (1.45 m) at the posts and 3 feet (0.91 m) in the middle. The distance of the service line from the net was reduced from 26 feet (7.9 m) to 22 feet (6.7 m). Arthur Myers was the first player to serve over hand.

== Singles ==
=== Final ===
(United Kingdom) Frank Hadow defeated (United Kingdom) Spencer Gore, 7–5, 6–1, 9–7

- This was Hadow's first and only Major.

=== All Comers' Final ===
(United Kingdom) Frank Hadow defeated (United Kingdom) Robert Erskine, 6–4, 6–4, 6–4

Preceded by 1877 Wimbledon Championships	Grand Slams	Succeeded by 1879 Wimbledon Championships
