= 1878 women's tennis season =

1878 Women's Tennis Season
Details
- Duration: September 1878 – October 1878
- Edition: 3rd
- Tournaments: 2
- Categories: Regional (1); Regular (1)

Achievements (singles)
- Most titles: (Ireland) Miss Smith (1) (United States) Mary Outerbridge (1)
- Most finals: (Ireland) Miss Smith (1) (United States) Mary Outerbridge (1)

The 1878 Women's Tennis Season was mainly composed of regional, local amateur tournaments. This year 2 tennis events for women were staged in Limerick, Ireland and Staten Island, New York City, United States between September and October 1878

== Season summary ==
The women's amateur tennis seasons covers a period of thirty five years from 1876 to 1912. During this period there was no single international organization responsible for overseeing tennis. At the very start in tennis history lawn tennis clubs themselves organized events and some like the All England Lawn Tennis and Croquet Club in England (f.1877) and the Fitzwilliam Lawn Tennis Club, Ireland (f.1879) generally oversaw tennis in their respective countries.

This would later change when tennis players started (those that could) traveling the world to compete in events organized by individual national lawn tennis associations (NLTA)s, the oldest of which then was the United States Lawn Tennis Association (f. 1881). Certain countries that did not establish a national association until later, had provincial, regional or state lawn tennis associations overseeing tournaments in a province, region or state within a country, such as the Northern Lawn Tennis Association in Manchester, England (f.1880), had responsibility for coordinating tournaments staged by clubs in the North of England region. In Australia the Victorian Lawn Tennis Association (f.1904) organised tournaments in the state of Victoria, Australia.

In 1878 only two tournaments for women were staged one of them in Ireland. At the third edition of South of Ireland Championships in Limerick the singles event was won by a Miss Smith. In the United States the Ladies Club for Outdoor Sports and offshoot of the Staten Island Crocket and Baseball Club, Camp Washington, New Brighton, New York City organized a women's event at the combined Staten Island Crocket and Baseball Club Tournament.

In Japan in 1878 a Ladies' Lawn Tennis & Croquet Club (LLTCC) was founded at Yamate Park by British ladies expatriates living in the foreign settlement in Yokohama made history by forming the first genuine tennis club in Japan. At the 1878 Wimbledon Championships the world's first major tennis tournament, it still remained an all men's event, no women's events were staged.

In 1913 the International Lawn Tennis Federation was created, that consisted of national member associations. The ILTF through its associated members then became responsible for supervising women's tour events.

== Season results ==
Notes 1: Challenge Round: the final round of a tournament, in which the winner of a single-elimination phase faces the previous year's champion, who plays only that one match. The challenge round was used in the early history of tennis (from 1877 through 1921), in some tournaments not all.

* Indicates doubles ** mixed doubles

Notes 2:Tournaments in italics were events that were staged only once that season

Key

Main events
National events
Provincial/Regional/State events
County events
Regular events

=== January to August ===
No events

=== September ===
Ended	Tournament	Winner	Finalist	Semi Finalist	Quarter Finalist
Sep 26.	South of Ireland Championships; Limerick, County Limerick, Ireland; Outdoor; Grass; Singles	(Ireland) Miss Smith; 6-1, 6-1	(Ireland) Mrs E. Lyons	(Ireland) Miss Royse	(Ireland) Miss Collingwood (Ireland) Miss M. Lysaght (Ireland) Miss Isabella Royse
Sep 26.	South of Ireland Championships; Limerick, County Limerick, Ireland; Outdoor; Grass; Singles	(Ireland) Helena Considine ** (Ireland) Heffernan Considine ** 6-4, 3–6, 6-2	(Ireland) Miss Lumley (England) Robert Howden Kellie	(Ireland) Miss Royse	(Ireland) Miss Collingwood (Ireland) Miss M. Lysaght (Ireland) Miss Isabella Royse

=== October ===
Ended	Tournament	Winner	Finalist	Semi Finalist	Quarter Finalist
Oct 11	Staten Island Cricket and Baseball Club Tournament; Camp Washington, New Brighton, Staten Island, United States; Outdoor; Grass; Singles	(United States) Mary Outerbridge; 13-11, 5-0	(United States) L. Outerbridge		
Oct 11	Staten Island Cricket and Baseball Club Tournament; Camp Washington, New Brighton, Staten Island, United States; Outdoor; Grass; Singles	(United States) Mary Outerbridge * (United States) L. Outerbridge; 13-11, 5-1	(United States) Adeline Robinson (United States) Miss West		

=== November to December ===
No events

== Tournament winners ==
=== Singles ===
This is list of winners sorted by number of singles titles

- (Ireland) Miss Smith (1) Limerick
- (United States) Mary Outerbridge (1) Staten Island

=== Doubles ===
This is list of winners sorted by number of doubles titles

- (United States) Mary Outerbridge & (United States) L. Outerbridge (1) Staten Island
