= 1877 in sports =

1877 in sports describes the year's events in world sport.

== Athletics ==
- USA Outdoor Track and Field Championships

== American football ==
College championship

- College football national championship – Yale Bulldogs

Events

- Disagreement about the number of players per team prevents Yale Bulldogs from joining Columbia Lions, Harvard Crimson and Princeton Tigers in the Intercollegiate Football Association

== Association football ==
England

- FA Cup final – The Wanderers 2–1 Oxford University at The Oval (after extra time).
- A major step towards unity in football is achieved when the Sheffield FA joins The Football Association after the FA Laws are amended to effect an agreed compromise. One significant change to the Laws is the introduction of the throw–in to replace the kick–in.
- Wolverhampton Wanderers founded as St Luke's FC by staff and pupils of St Luke's School in Blakenhall. The present name will be adopted in 1879 after St Luke's merges with Blakenhall Wanderers Cricket Club.

Scotland

- Scottish Cup final – Vale of Leven 3–2 Rangers (second replay after two 1–1 draws)
- Establishment of Clyde FC at Rutherglen and St Mirren FC at Paisley.

Wales

- 5 March — Wales plays its first home international match at the Racecourse Ground in Wrexham against Scotland. Scotland wins 2–0.

== Australian rules football ==
Events

- The South Australian Football Association is formed on 30 April. The first premiers are South Adelaide FC
- The Victorian Football Association is formed on 17 May and is the highest level of the sport in Victoria until surpassed in 1897 by the breakaway Victorian Football League (now known as the Australian Football League). The first premiers are Carlton FC.

== Baseball ==
National championship

- National League champions – Boston Red Caps

Events

- Star pitcher Jim Devlin and three other Louisville Grays are permanently expelled from the National League for arranging with gamblers to lose games. (Louisville finishes seven games behind Boston.)

== Boxing ==
Events

- Future world champion John L. Sullivan begins his career by fighting as an amateur in his native Boston. He wins his earliest known bout against Jack Scannell with a first-round knockout.

== Cricket ==
Events

- 15–19 March — Australia v. England at Melbourne Cricket Ground (MCG) will afterwards be recognised as the first-ever Test match. Australia win by 45 runs with Charles Bannerman scoring 165*: the first Test century. William Midwinter, with 5–78 in England's first innings, is the first bowler to take five wickets in a Test innings.
- 31 March to 4 April — Australia v. England in the Second Test, also at the MCG. England win by 4 wickets.
- 10 & 12 November — South Australia v. Tasmania at Adelaide Oval is the earliest first-class match played by South Australia who win by an innings and 13 runs, their team including George Giffen.

England

- Champion County – Gloucestershire
- Most runs – W. G. Grace 1,474 @ 39.83 (HS 261)
- Most wickets – W. G. Grace 179 @ 12.81 (BB 9–55)

Australia

- Most runs – Charles Bannerman (HS 165*) and George Ulyett (HS 94) score 243 runs each @ 48.60
- Most wickets – Alfred Shaw 17 wickets @ 11.76 (BB 5–19)

== Golf ==
Major tournaments

- British Open – Jamie Anderson

== Horse racing ==
England

- Grand National – Austerlitz
- 1,000 Guineas Stakes – Belphoebe
- 2,000 Guineas Stakes – Chamant
- The Derby – Silvio
- The Oaks – Placida
- St. Leger Stakes – Silvio

Australia

- Melbourne Cup – Chester

Canada

- Queen's Plate – Amelia

Ireland

- Irish Grand National – Thiggin-Thue
- Irish Derby Stakes – Redskin

USA

- Kentucky Derby – Baden-Baden
- Preakness Stakes – Cloverbrook
- Belmont Stakes – Cloverbrook

== Ice hockey ==
- First set of ice hockey rules are published in the Montreal Gazette.
- Founding of McGill University Hockey Club.

== Lacrosse ==
Events

- November — inaugural intercollegiate game is held between New York University and Manhattan University

== Rowing ==
The Boat Race

- 24 March — the result of the 34th Oxford and Cambridge Boat Race is a dead heat

== Rugby football ==
Events

- Establishment of Broughton Rangers, Newcastle RFC, Nottingham R.F.C. and Olney RFC

== Tennis ==
England

- Inaugural Lawn Tennis Championship held at All England Lawn Tennis and Croquet Club in Wimbledon, south London. The first tournament stages only the men's singles championship won by Spencer Gore (England) who defeats William Marshall (England) in the final by 6–1, 6–2, 6–4.
- The 1st pre-open era 1877 Men's Tennis tour gets underway 3 tournaments are staged this year between 19 July – 9 October 1877.
