= Tivyside LTC Tournament =

Defunct tennis tournament
- Founded: 1881; 144 years ago
- Abolished: 1893; 132 years ago
- Location: Newcastle Emlyn, Carmarthenshire, Wales
- Venue: Tivyside LTC
- Surface: Grass

The Tivyside LTC Tournament was a grass court tennis tournament established in 1881 and continued to be held until at least the 1893. The tournament was played at Newcastle Emlyn, Carmarthenshire, Wales.

== History ==
The Tivyside Lawn Tennis Club was founded in 1878. There were four grass courts and two croquet lawns. The grass courts were located in the meadows downstream of the river Teifi in Adpar, with a small pavilion and refreshments marquee (Emlyn Arms supplied). The first champion in 1881 was George Bowen of Llwyngwair. Bowen was also Master of the Tivyside Hunt, 1893–97 and High Sheriff of Pembrokeshire in 1914.

In 1908 the earliest records of the existence of a Tivyside Lawn Tennis & Croquet & Bowls Club in Newcastle Emlyn, was listed in the Tivyside Advertiser Newspaper. The Tivyside Lawn Tennis Club shared the Teifiside LTC facilities. The Tivyside Lawn Tennis Club also staged its own tournaments. In 1956 the grounds were sold and the club became non-existent.

== Finals ==
=== Men's Singles ===
(incomplete roll)

- 1881— (Wales) George Bevan Bowen d. ?
- 1882— (Wales) George Bevan Bowen d. ?
- 1883— (Wales) George Bevan Bowen d. (England) J. Brenchley, 6-5 (only one set played)
- 1885— (United Kingdom) H.S. Brenchley. d. (England) Wilfrid Edward Sturges-Jones, 6-4 2-6 6–2.

=== Women's Singles ===
(incomplete roll)

- 1893— (Wales) Miss Jones (Penylan) won.

== See also ==
- Teifiside LTC Championship
