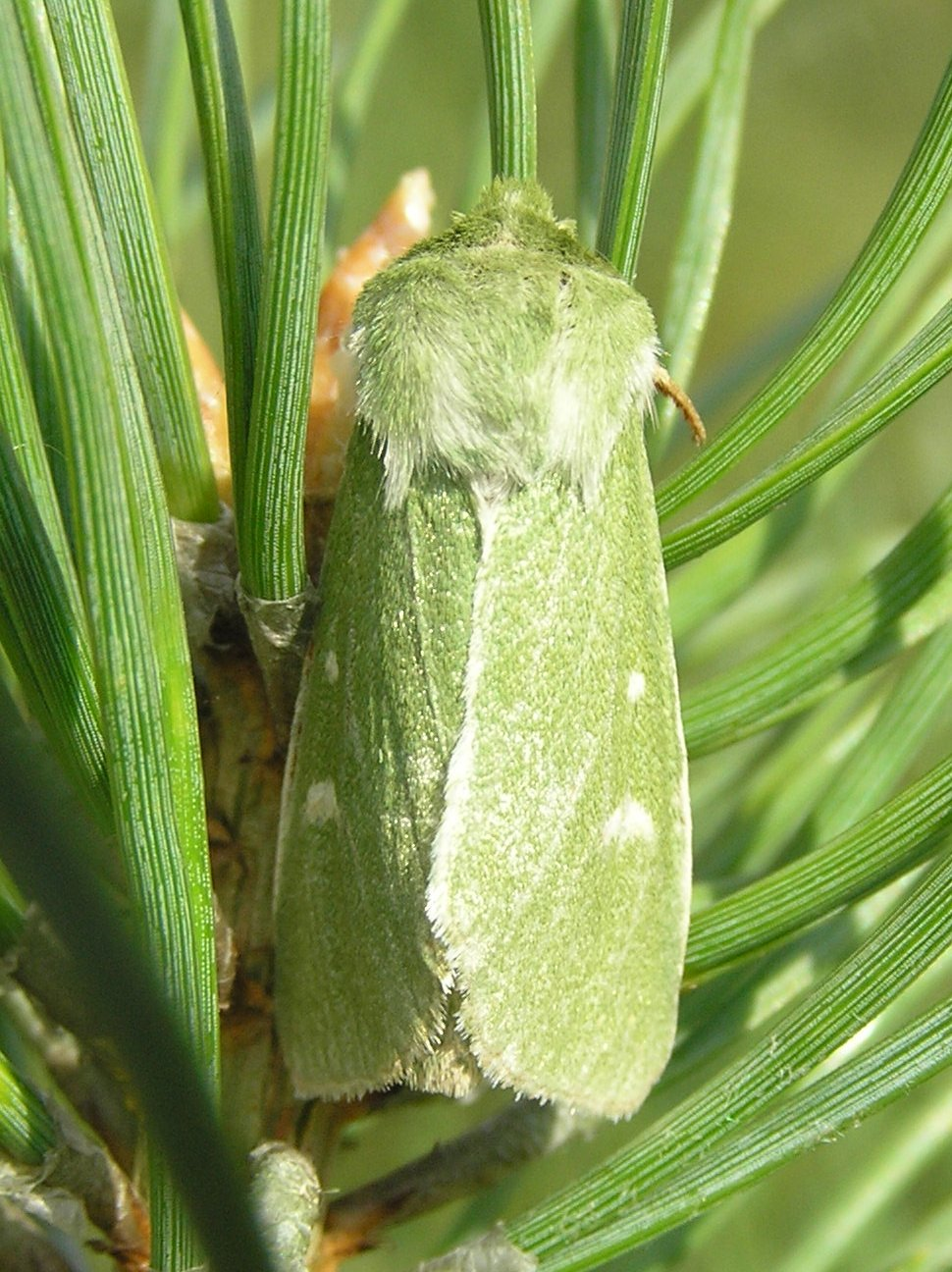

Scientific classification
- Kingdom: Animalia
- Phylum: Arthropoda
- Class: Insecta
- Order: Lepidoptera
- Superfamily: Noctuoidea
- Family: Noctuidae
- Genus: Calamia
- Species: C. tridens

Binomial name
- Calamia tridens (Hufnagel, 1766)

= Calamia tridens =

Species of moth

Calamia tridens, the Burren Green, is a moth of the family Noctuidae.

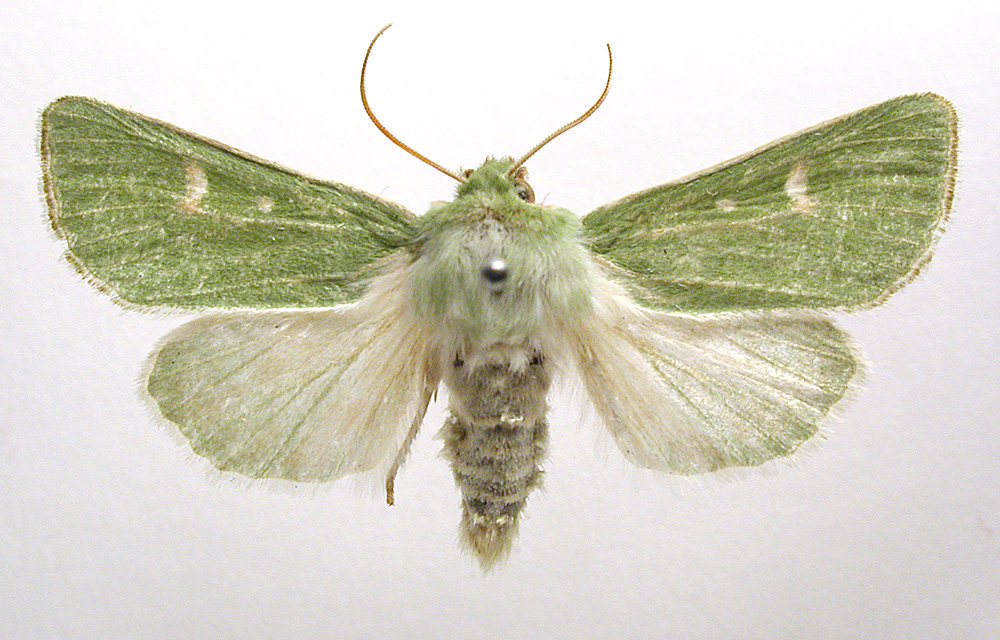
Mounted

== Description ==
The wingspan is 37–42 mm. The length of the forewings is 17–18 mm. Whitish green, of the o more or less suffused with grey except along costa, showing a pale curved outer band; fringe white; — in ab. immaculata Stgr. the whole forewing is uniformly green, with no race of a white reniform. and the hindwings of the male are not fuscous; — ab. thalassina ab. nov. [Warren] has the forewing glossy dark sea-green, with the outer half of fringe greenish; the hindwing green flushed with darker green and the veins green: head and thorax sea green like the forewings; the abdomen white as in typical virens: the description is made from 1 male and 2 females in the Tring Museum, unfortunately without locality label, but probably of German origin; 1 female has a diffuse whitish smear on the discocellular, the others are immaculate: the ab. rufata ab. nov. [Warren] has the reniform filled up with rufous fuscous or with the white discocellular edged with rufous, and the whole hindwing brownish grey with the fringe white.

== Biology ==
The moth flies in one generation from late June to September.

The larvae feed on various grasses including Purple Moor Grass, and flowering plants such as Stellaria and Plantago.

== Distribution ==
It is found in the Palearctic realm, Central Europe, (not Britain but found in Ireland, found in southern Sweden, not in southeast France, not in Spain, not in southern Italy), West and Central Russia, Hungary, South Russia, Armenia, Asia Minor, Iran, West Siberia to the Altai Mountains and Kazakhstan. Also Issyk-kul, and the Tarbagatai Mountains.

=== Ireland ===
The vernacular name Burren Green reflects its presence in the Burren region in western Ireland, its only station on the islands of the North Atlantic. It was first collected 1949 by William Stuart Wright and its identification made by Eric Classey who was sent specimens by Wright. An alternative name proposed for the species, the Claddagh, never gained acceptance. The Irish population has been described as a subspecies, occidentalis Cockayne 1954

== Notes ==
1. The flight season refers to Belgium and the Netherlands. This may vary in other parts of the range.
