= Grand National Lawn Tennis Tournament =

Defunct tennis tournament
- Tour: Amateur Tour (1876–1912)
- Founded: 1879
- Abolished: 1879
- Location: Hendon, Middlesex, England.
- Venue: The Hyde
- Surface: Grass (outdoor)

The Grand National Lawn Tennis Tournament was an early Victorian era outdoor grass court tennis tournament staged only one time between June and July 1879 at The Hyde, Hendon, Middlesex, England.

== History ==
The Grand National Tennis Tournament was outdoor grass court tennis tournament staged only one time between June and July 1879 at The Hyde, Hendon, Middlesex, England. This tournament began on 30 June. Heavy rain interrupted play from the quarter-finals onwards, and final was eventually played on 31 July 1879. The tournament featured a number of the leading tennis players of the day including Herbert Lawford, Otway Woodhouse, Henry Lyle Mulholland and William Cecil Marshall. 34 players entered the draw and the men's singles title was won by Britain's Edgar Lubbcock who defeated Scotland's Lestocq Robert Erskine.

== Finals ==
=== Men's singles ===
Year	Champions	Runners-up	Score
1879	(England) Edgar Lubbock	(Scotland) Lestocq Robert Erskine	6–1, 6–0, 8–6.

== Sources ==
- Authors, Various (30 July 2022). Routledge Library Editions: Sports Studies. London: Taylor & Francis. ISBN 978-1-317-67949-3.
- Bowles, T. G.; Fry, O. A. (1879). Vanity Fair. (1879). London: England.
- Nieuwland, Alex. "Grand National Tournament 1879". www.tennisarchives.com. Netherlands: Tennis Archives.
- The Illustrated London News. (1879). London, England: Elm House.
