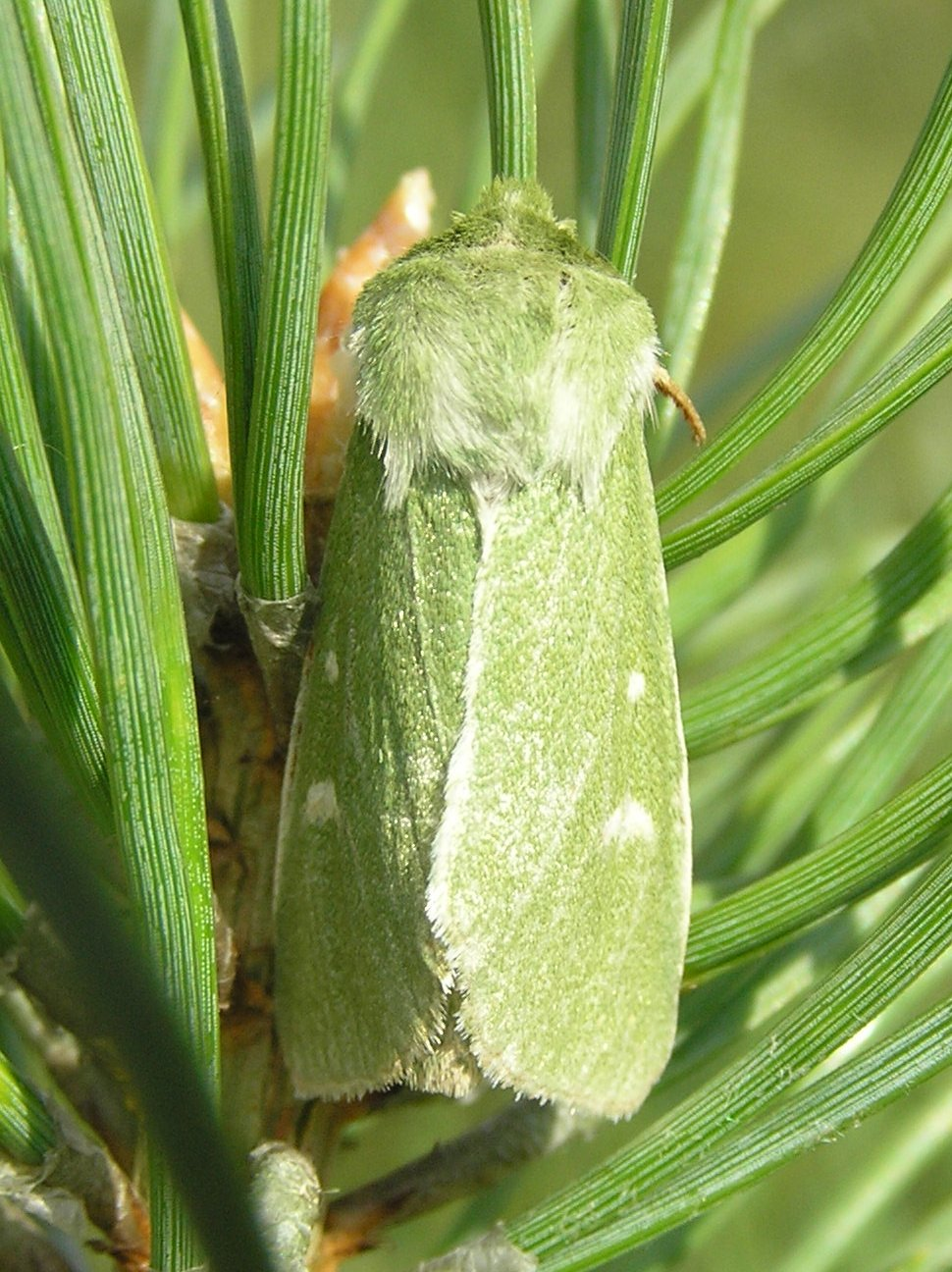
- Calamia tridens

Scientific classification
- Kingdom: Animalia
- Phylum: Arthropoda
- Clade: Pancrustacea
- Class: Insecta
- Order: Lepidoptera
- Superfamily: Noctuoidea
- Family: Noctuidae
- Tribe: Apameini
- Genus: Calamia; Hübner, [1821]

= Calamia =

Genus of moths

Calamia is a genus of moths of the family Noctuidae.

== Species ==
- Calamia deliciosa Boursin, 1957
- Calamia flavirufa Hampson, 1910
- Calamia metamorpha (Boursin, 1960)
- Calamia staudingeri Warnecke, 1941
- Calamia tridens (Hufnagel, 1766) – Burren green
