= Calamia deliciosa =

Scientific classification
- Domain: Eukaryota
- Kingdom: Animalia
- Phylum: Arthropoda
- Class: Insecta
- Order: Lepidoptera
- Superfamily: Noctuoidea
- Family: Noctuidae
- Genus: Calamia
- Species: C. deliciosa

Binomial name
- Calamia deliciosa Boursin, 1957

Species of moth

Calamia deliciosa is a moth of the family Noctuidae. It is found in Afghanistan.
