= Arthur Thomas Myers =

British physician and sportsman (1851–1894)

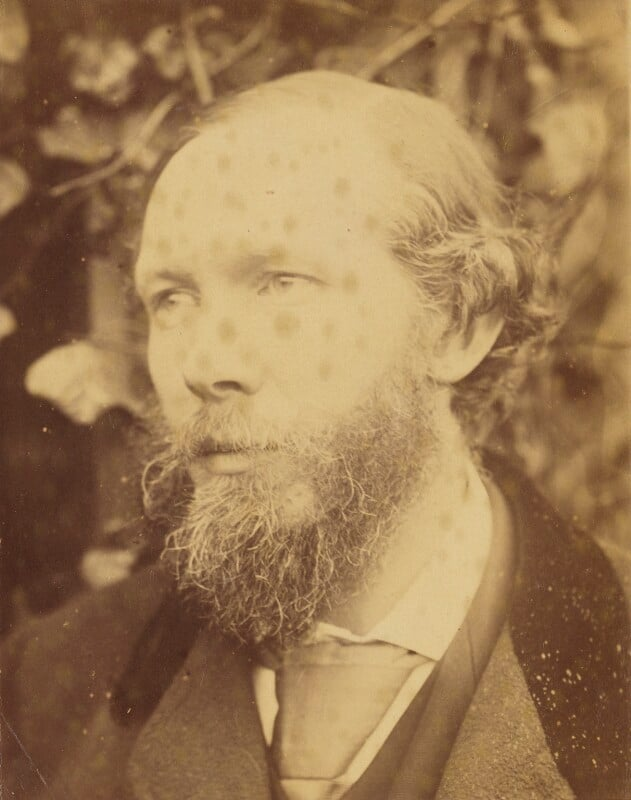
- Country (sports): United Kingdom
- Born: 16 April 1851 Keswick, Cumberland
- Died: 10 January 1894 (aged 42) Marylebone, London

Grand Slam singles results
- Wimbledon: QF (1878)

Arthur Thomas Myers (16 April 1851 – 10 January 1894) was a British physician and sportsman. As a tennis player he participated in two Wimbledon Championships and also played first-class cricket. He was the brother of scholar Frederic William Henry Myers and poet Ernest Myers.

Myers suffered from epilepsy and he is thought to have taken his own life in 1894. There were no known cures for epilepsy during his lifetime. When his epileptic attacks got to be too much for him, this resulted in his untimely death at the age of forty-two.

== Epilepsy and researching treatments for nerve disease ==
Myers was born in Cumberland, England and studied at Cheltenham and Trinity College. Aside from his fame from playing tennis, he is also known for his work as a physician at Belgrave Hospital for Children. Due to his health issues, Arthur put his tennis career to a halt and pursued his passion for psychological studies and phenomena of the mind. Due to his epileptic seizures, Myers was never given a position with the staff in the teaching hospital. This resulted in him writing several papers for the Society for Psychical Research, which was founded by his brother Frederic, regarding abstruse problems that were connected to nerve disease and how hypnotism can treat the disease.

== First-class cricket ==
While studying at Trinity College, Cambridge, in 1870, Myers played a first-class cricket match for Cambridge University against the Marylebone Cricket Club. He batted in the middle order and scored seven in the first innings, then six in the second. He was a Cambridge Apostle. Arthur earned his Doctor of Medicine degree in 1881, and became a Fellow for the College of Physicians in 1893.

== Wimbledon Championship ==
In 1878, he competed in his first Wimbledon and made it into the quarter-finals, before being defeated in straight sets by eventual champion Frank Hadow. The following year he won his first two matches and was eliminated in the third round, by Irishman C. D. Barry.

== Suicide ==
Myers suffered from epilepsy and is believed to have taken his own life in 1894. John Hughlings Jackson published a study of his case. It was believed that Arthur belonged to a family of great intellect and that he was devoted to his studies. Although psychology was still relatively new in the late nineteenth century, there were no known cures for epilepsy. When his epileptic attacks got to be too much for him, it resulted in his untimely death at the age of forty-two.
