= Waterford Open =

Defunct tennis tournament
- Founded: 1877
- Abolished: 1888
- Editions: 12
- Location: Waterford Cricket Club; Watford LTC; Rocklands; Waterford; Munster; Ireland
- Surface: outdoor (Grass)

The Waterford Open also known as the Waterford Annual Lawn Tennis Tournament was a men's and women's tennis tournament was played on outdoor grass courts in Waterford, Ireland from 1877 through 1888.

== History ==
The Waterford Annual Lawn Tennis Tournament was played at Waterford Cricket Club, Rocklands later called Waterford Lawn Tennis club in Ireland on outdoor grass courts from 1877 to 1888 for twelve editions only, toward the end of its run it was known as the Waterford Open Tournament.Dublin Daily Express. The tournament made its debut on both the 1877 men's tennis season and the 1877 women's tennis season

== Finals ==
Included:

=== Men's singles ===
Year	Winners	Runner's-up	Score
1877	(Ireland) Vere St. Leger Goold	(Ireland) H. H. Elliott	?
1878	(Ireland) Vere St. Leger Goold (2)	(Ireland) John M. Brown	?
1879	(Ireland) Vere St. Leger Goold (3)	(Ireland) William Gore Burroughs	?
1880	(Ireland) Vere St. Leger Goold (4)	(Ireland) Frederick William Knox	6-1 6-2
1881	(Ireland) Michael G. McNamara	(Ireland) James Jocelyn Glascott	6-2 6-3
1882	(Ireland) Michael G. McNamara (2)	(Ireland) W. G. Wyld	6-3 6-0
1883	(United Kingdom) George M. Butterworth	(Ireland) Frederick William Knox	3-6 8-6 6-1
1884	(Ireland) Frederick William Knox	(United Kingdom) George M. Butterworth	6-4 7-5 6-4
1885	(Ireland) Toler Roberts Garvey	(Ireland) Frederick William Knox	6-1 6-0 6-0
1886	(Ireland) William Drumond Hamilton	(Ireland) Toler Roberts Garvey	6-4 3-6 6-1 0-6 6-0
1887	(Ireland) William Drumond Hamilton (2)	(Ireland) Grainger Chaytor	4-6 6-2 6-3 5-7 6-1
1888	(Ireland) William Drumond Hamilton (3)	(Ireland) Manliffe Goodbody	4-6 6-4 6-4 6-3

=== Women's Singles ===
(incomplete roll)

Year	Winners	Runner's-up	Score
1877.	(Ireland) Frances Gallwey	(Ireland) Miss Donagh	defeated
1880.	(Ireland) May Langrishe	(Ireland) Deidre Meldon	6-5, 6-0
1881.	(Ireland) May Langrishe (2)	(Ireland) Adela Langrishe	6-2, 6-1
1886.	(Ireland) May Langrishe (3)	(Ireland) Ann Gallwey	6-0, 6-0
1887.	(Ireland) Phyllis Knox	(Ireland) Theresa Knox	4-6, 6-4, 6-2

=== Mixed doubles ===
Year	Winners	Runner's-up	Score
1877	(Ireland) Miss Radcliffe (Ireland) Henry Joseph Gallwey	(Ireland) Frances Gallwey (Ireland) Benjamin E. Bunbury	defeated.
1886	(Ireland) May Langrishe (Ireland) Toler Roberts Garvey	(Ireland) Frances Gallwey (Ireland) Henry Joseph Gallwey	6-3, 6-3

== Sources ==
- Evelegh, B. C. (1883-1891). ed. The "Field" Lawn Tennis Calendar. London. England.
- Longman C.J. and Walrond H. (1880-1891). ed's The Badminton Library of Sports and Pastimes. London. Longmans Green and Company.
