= Arthur Tabor =

English cricketer

Arthur Sydney Tabor (9 November 1852 – 14 October 1927) was an English first-class cricketer active 1872–87 who played for Middlesex, Surrey, Cambridge University and represented the Gentlemen in the Gentlemen v Players series. He was born in Middlesex; died in Earl's Court.
