= Alexander Hadow =

English cricketer

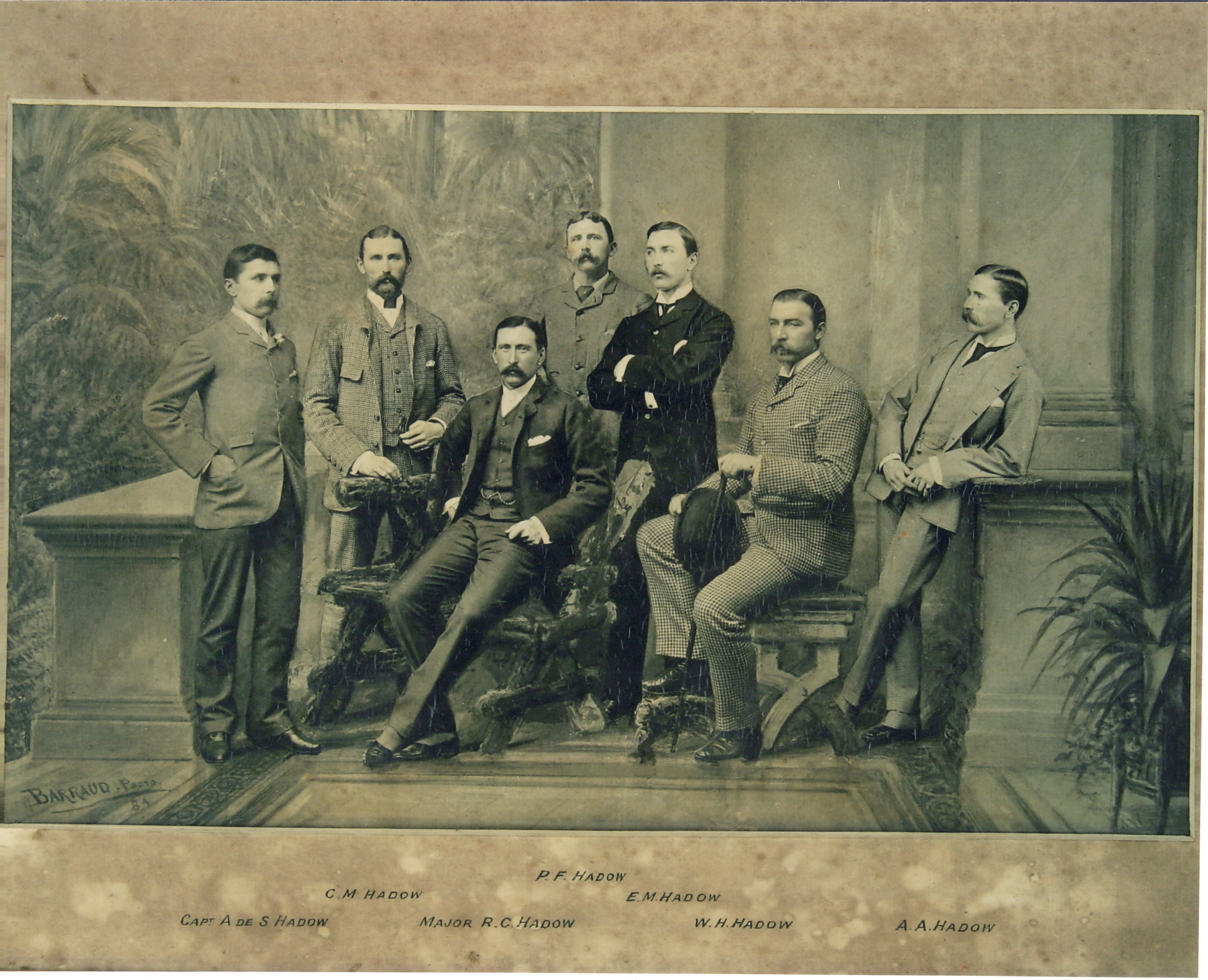
The Hadow family. Alexander Hadow is standing right.

Alexander Astell Hadow (1 June 1853 – 1 June 1894) was an English first-class cricketer active 1872 who played for Middlesex. He was born in Regent's Park; died in Bad Neuenahr.
