= Moy and Charlemont LTC Tournament =

Defunct tennis tournament
- Founded: 1878; 147 years ago
- Abolished: 1878; 147 years ago
- Location: Moy, County Tyrone, Northern Ireland
- Venue: Moy and Charlemont Croquet and Lawn Tennis Club
- Surface: Grass

The Moy and Charlemont LTC Tournament was a Victorian era grass court tennis tournament staged only one time in October 1878. first held at the Moy and Charlemont Croquet and Lawn Tennis Club, Moy, County Tyrone, Northern Ireland.

== History ==
The Moy and Charlemont LTC Tournament was an late Victorian period grass court tennis tournament staged only one time in October 1878. The gentleman's singles event was won by Mr. Robert Baron Templer who defeated Mr. S. Phipson Templer. A gentleman's doubles event was also staged that was won by Mr. S. Phipson and William Lyle who defeated Mr. Irvine and Captain Richardson.
