= Newton Abbott Lawn Tennis Tournament =

Defunct tennis tournament
- Founded: 1878; 147 years ago
- Abolished: 1885; 140 years ago
- Location: South Devon Cricket Club Ground, Newton Abbot, Devon, England
- Venue: Newton Abbot Archery and Lawn Tennis Club
- Surface: Grass

The Newton Abbott Lawn Tennis Tournament a late Victorian era grass court tennis tournament staged first staged on 23 September 1878. The tournament was organised by the Newton Abbot Archery and Lawn Tennis Club, and was played at the South Devon Cricket Club Ground, Newton Abbot, Devon, England. The tournament was held until 1885.

== History ==
The Newon Abbott Lawn Tennis Tournament was grass court tennis event first staged in September 1878. This tournament was held for six editions and appeared to have ended in 1885. Newton Abbott Squash & Tennis Club is still in existence today.

== Sources ==
- "About". www.nasquash.co.uk. Newton Abbot Squash & Tennis Club.
- Exeter and Plymouth Gazette Daily Telegrams. (9 July 1878) Plymouth, Devon, England: British Newspaper Archives.
- Nieuwland, Alex. "Tournament – Newton Abbot". www.tennisarchives.com. Tennis Archives. Retrieved 10 December 2022.
