= 1877 Grand National =

English steeplechase horse race

- Grand National
- Location: Aintree
- Date: 23 March 1877
- Winning horse: Austerlitz
- Starting price: 15/1
- Jockey: Mr Fred Hobson
- Trainer: Robert I’Anson
- Owner: Fred Hobson
- Conditions: Good

The 1877 Grand National was the 39th renewal of the Grand National horse race that took place at Aintree near Liverpool, England, on 23 March 1877.

== The Course ==
Reports of the course in some of the press appear conflicting and suggest being written from memory, one reporter admitting they hadn't seen the course since riding it five years earlier.

First circuit: From the start, the runners had a long run away from the racecourse, across the lane towards Fence 1 {13} Rails and Hedge. Fence 2 {14} Rail and Ditch, Fence 3 {15} Double Rails, Fence 4 {16} Rails and Ditch, Fence 5 {17} Becher's Brook Fence 6 {18} Post and Rails, Fence 7 {19} The Canal Turn also known as the turn for Valentines or the Double Fence 8 {20} Valentine's Brook, Fence 9 {21} Drop, Fence 10 {22} Post and Rails.

The runners then crossed the lane at the canal bridge, where a table jump had formerly stood, although there still appears to have been an incline into the lane, most reporters no longer regarded this as an actual obstacle to be jumped any more. On crossing the lane, the runners re-entered the racecourse proper, turning at the first opportunity towards the fences in front of the stands. Fence 11 Bush, Fence 12 Stand Water.

Second circuit: The runners then turned away from the Grandstands and crossed the lane again, following the first circuit until reaching the racecourse. This time the runners continued to the wider extreme of the course after crossing the lane at canal bridge before turning to run up the straight in front of the stands where two hurdles, Fence 23 and Fence 24 had to be jumped

The runners then bypassed the Bush and Stand Water inside before reaching the winning post in front of the Main Stand.

== Finishing Order ==
Position	Name	Jockey	Handicap (st-lb)	SP	Distance
01	Austerlitz	Fred Hobson	10-8	15-1	4 lengths
02	Congress	Joe Cannon	12-7	20-1	A Neck
03	The Liberator	Tommy Pickernell	10-12	25-1	
04	Chimney Sweep	John Jones	10-13	7-1	
05	Dainty	John? Goodwin	10-14	20-1	
06	Shifnal	Robert I'Anson	11-5	100-14	
07	Citizen	Bill Reeves	10-5	12-1	

== Non-finishers ==
Fence	Name	Jockey	Handicap (st-lb)	SP	Fate
	Regal	James Jewitt	12-2	8-1	Fell
	Reugny	Ted Wilson	11-6	100-15	Pulled Up
	Pride of Kildare	W Canavan	11-4	12-1	Fell
21	Zero	J Sherrington	11-2	50-1	Refused
	Lancet	Mr Daniels	11-0	33-1	Pulled Up
	Gamebird	Mr Appleton	10-11	25-1	Fell
	Sultana	Tommy Beasley	10-11	50-1	Pulled Up
	Earl Marshall	Gilbert Elliott	10-10	100-1	Fell
25	Arbitrator	Hiram(?) Crawshaw	10-6	14-1	Fell
