= Teifiside LTC Championship =

Teifiside Lawn Tennis Club Tournament

Defunct tennis tournament
- Event name
- Founded: 1878; 148 years ago
- Abolished: 1892; 134 years ago
- Location: Newcastle Emlyn, Carmarthenshire, Wales
- Venue: Teifiside Lawn Tennis Club Grounds
- Surface: Grass

The Teifiside LTC Championship was an early late Victorian era men's and women's grass court tennis tournament first staged in 1878 at the Teifiside Lawn Tennis Club, Newcastle Emlyn, Carmarthenshire, Wales. The tournament was held to at least 1892.

== History ==
In the 1800s the Teifiside LTC grass courts were located in the meadows downstream of the River Teifi in Adpar, with a small pavilion and a marquee donated by the Emlyn Arms public house. In 1878 the first club championship was held, won by Henry Gwyn Saunders Davies. In 1879 the men's club championship was won by Mr. G. Lloyd. In 1881 the club championship Teifiside club was won by a Mr. Bowen, he also won the Cardingan club's championship. During this period the club had four grass courts, and two croquet fields, the head groundsman at the time was a Mr. Richards.

In 1889 a meeting held at the Salutation Hotel, Bridge St. Newcastle Emlyn, chaired by Captain Jones-Parry who resigned as club president, and Mr Fitzwilliams was elected. A Major Bate was elected as the new club secretary and treasurer. On 30 August 1892 the club held a tournament that featured a mixed doubles event. In 1908 the earliest records of the existence of a Tivyside Lawn Tennis & Croquet & Bowls Club in Newcastle Emlyn, was listed in the Tivyside Advertiser Newspaper. The Tivyside Lawn Tennis Club shared the Teifiside LTC facilities. The Tivyside Lawn Tennis Club also staged its own tournaments.

In 1936 the King George V Playing Fields association was formed and designated playing field area, it consisted of a bowling green and two new hard courts. An annual subscription fund was formed, and circulated to all clubs wishing to use the new grounds. In 1956 the Teifiside LTC grounds were sold, and the club had no facilities in which to play, however this was resurrected in the early 1960s, with the help of the Young Liberals Club. Unfortunately the club was closed again. In the mid 1980s the Carmarthen Urban District Council bought land in the town next to the King George V sports grounds. In early 1990 a new Newcastle Emlyn & Adpar Community Tennis Club was formed, and two new tarmac courts were laid after receiving grants from the Sports Council for Wales. The tennis club is still operating today.

== See also ==
- Tivyside LTC Tournament
