= County Wicklow Championships =

Tournament information
- Founded: 1878; 147 years ago
- Location: Bromley, County Wicklow (1878-80); Bray, County Wicklow (1911-current); Republic of Ireland
- Venue: County Wicklow Lawn Tennis Club
- Surface: Grass Court (1878-1967); Hard Court, outdoors
- Website: County Wicklow Lawn Tennis Club

Current champions
- Men's singles: (Republic of Ireland) Dave O’Hare (2015)
- Women's singles: (Republic of Ireland) Anna Bowtell (2015)

The County Wicklow Championships is a men's and women's grass court tennis tournament first staged in 1878 and first held at Bromley, County Wicklow, Ireland. The tournament was held to at least 1967 as part of the international tennis tour. The championships are still being held today

== History ==
This history of the County Wicklow Championships is divided into two parts the initial tournament that was staged in Bromley, County Wicklow, Ireland of which records of that events existence exist from 1878 to 1880. The first installment of the championships appears to have ended.

In August 1878 the County Wicklow Tournament and Championship was established at Bromley, County Wicklow, Ireland. In 1880 the tournament was held again between 17 and 21 August 1880.

In 1898 a new Wicklow Lawn Tennis Club was established at Bray, County Wicklow, Ireland. This new venue reestablished a second installment of the County Wicklow Championships in 1910, but formally played from 1911. The County Wicklow Championships ran as part of the worldwide international tour until at least 1967.

== Event names ==
The tournament is still being staged today. The men's event is officially known as the Meath Challenge Cup (County Wicklow Championship), the women's event is officially known as the Championship of South Eastern Counties (County Wicklow Championship) and the mixed doubles event is officially known as the Championship of County Wicklow.
