= Heliothis flavirufa =

Scientific classification
- Kingdom: Animalia
- Phylum: Arthropoda
- Class: Insecta
- Order: Lepidoptera
- Superfamily: Noctuoidea
- Family: Noctuidae
- Genus: Heliothis
- Species: H. flavirufa

Binomial name
- Heliothis flavirufa Hampson, 1910

Synonyms
- Calmia flavirufa

Species of moth

Heliothis flavirufa is a moth of the family Noctuidae. It is found in Southern Africa, including Zimbabwe and Eswatini.
