= 1878 Wimbledon Championship – Singles =

Singles
- 1878 Wimbledon Championship

Final
- Champions: (United Kingdom) Frank Hadow
- Runners-up: (United Kingdom) Spencer Gore
- Score: 7–5, 6–1, 9–7

Details
- Draw: 34
- Seeds: –

Events
Singles
← 1877 ·	Wimbledon Championship	· 1879 →

Frank Hadow defeated Robert Erskine 6–4, 6–4, 6–4 in the All Comers' Final, and then defeated the reigning champion Spencer Gore 7–5, 6–1, 9–7 in the challenge round to win the gentlemen's singles tennis title at the 1878 Wimbledon Championships.

== Draw ==
=== Key ===
- Q = Qualifier
- WC = Wild card
- LL = Lucky loser
- Alt = Alternate
- SE = Special exempt
- PR = Protected ranking
- ITF = ITF entry
- JE = Junior exempt
- w/o = Walkover
- r = Retired
- d = Defaulted
- SR = Special ranking

=== Challenge round ===
Challenge Round
(United Kingdom) Frank Hadow	7	6	9
(United Kingdom) Spencer Gore	5	1	7

=== All comers' finals ===
Quarterfinals
(United Kingdom) Robert Erskine	6	3	6	3	6
(United Kingdom) Charles Hamilton	4	6	1	6	5
(United Kingdom) Herbert Lawford
bye
(United Kingdom) Frank Hadow	6	6	6
(United Kingdom) Arthur Myers	0	4	3

Semifinals
(United Kingdom) Robert Erskine	6	6	6
(United Kingdom) Herbert Lawford	3	1	3
(United Kingdom) Frank Hadow
bye

Final
(United Kingdom) Robert Erskine	4	4	4
(United Kingdom) Frank Hadow	6	6	6

=== Earlier rounds ===
==== Section 1 ====
First round
(United Kingdom) Robert Erskine	6	6	6
(United Kingdom) AW Nicholson	1	1	3
(United Kingdom) Clapham
(United Kingdom) Crum
(United Kingdom) E Bates	0	6	0	6	3
(United Kingdom) FW Porter	6	3	6	3	6
(United Kingdom) Alexander Crichton	2	2	1
(United Kingdom) Seton Montgomerie	6	6	6
(United Kingdom) George Montgomerie	5	6	2	6	6
(United Kingdom) George Tabor	6	2	6	5	5
(United Kingdom) Charles Hamilton	6	6	6
(United Kingdom) F Pollock	1	1	3
(United Kingdom) Charles Heathcote	6	6	6
(United Kingdom) HTW Wheeler	4	2	0
(United Kingdom) Edmond Brackenbury	6	2	6	6
(United Kingdom) Gwynne James	1	6	0	0

Second round
(United Kingdom) R Erskine
w/o
(United Kingdom) FW Porter	5	6	3	6	6
(United Kingdom) S Montgomerie	6	5	6	2	1
(United Kingdom) G Montgomerie	6	4	5	3
(United Kingdom) CG Hamilton	5	6	6	6
(United Kingdom) C Heathcote	4	2	6	6	5
(United Kingdom) EB Brackenbury	6	6	4	4	6

Third round
(United Kingdom) R Erskine	6	6	5	6
(United Kingdom) FW Porter	1	3	6	1
(United Kingdom) CG Hamilton	6	6	6
(United Kingdom) EB Brackenbury	0	2	2

Quarterfinals
(United Kingdom) R Erskine	6	3	6	3	6
(United Kingdom) CG Hamilton	4	6	1	6	5

The match between Clapham and Crum was not played.

==== Section 2 ====
First round
(United Kingdom) A Keyser	w/o
(United Kingdom) Herbert Lawford
(United Kingdom) J Cunningham	3	2	0
(United Kingdom) Capt. Grimston	6	6	6
(United Kingdom) HS Cotton	1	1	0^{r}
(United Kingdom) ER Seymour	6	6	0

Second round
(United Kingdom) H Lawford	5	6	6	6
(United Kingdom) Capt. Grimston	6	4	4	5
(United Kingdom) ER Seymour
bye

Third round
(United Kingdom) H Lawford	6	5	6	6
(United Kingdom) ER Seymour	4	6	5	4

Quarterfinals
(United Kingdom) H Lawford
bye

==== Section 3 ====
First round
(United Kingdom) Arthur Tabor	6	6	6
(United Kingdom) C Wallis	0	0	0
(United Kingdom) Frank Hadow	6	6	6
(United Kingdom) Frederick Oliver	2	1	3
(United Kingdom) Robert Dalby	6	6	6
(United Kingdom) Beckwith Smith	2	3	3
(United Kingdom) FM Ashley	0	0	0
(United Kingdom) AC Brown	6	6	6
(United Kingdom) Geoffrey Buxton	5	4	0
(United Kingdom) Arthur Myers	6	6	6
(United Kingdom) C Ewbank	6	1	1	2
(United Kingdom) Alexander Hadow	5	6	6	6

Second round
(United Kingdom) A Tabor	2	1	1
(United Kingdom) F Hadow	6	6	6
(United Kingdom) RD Dalby	1	1	1
(United Kingdom) AC Brown	6	6	6
(United Kingdom) A Myers	6	0	6	1	6
(United Kingdom) A Hadow	1	6	4	6	2

Third round
(United Kingdom) F Hadow	6	6	6
(United Kingdom) AC Brown	2	3	0
(United Kingdom) A Myers
bye

Quarterfinals
(United Kingdom) F Hadow	6	6	6
(United Kingdom) A Myers	0	4	3
