= Clement Cottrell =

English cricketer

- Full name: Clement Edward Cottrell
- Country (sports): United Kingdom
- Born: 28 May 1854 Westminster, London, England
- Died: 21 January 1897 (age 43) Brighton, Sussex, England
- Turned pro: 1877 (amateur tour)
- Retired: 1883

Singles
- Career titles: 6

Clement Edward Cottrell (28 May 1854 – 21 January 1897) was a Victorian era English sportsman born in London, England. He played lawn tennis and won the Championship of the Esher LTC six times between (1877-1882) In addition he was a first class cricketer who played for Middlesex. He died in Brighton, Sussex, England.

== Early life ==
Cotterell was born on 28 May 1854 in Westminster, London, England.

== Cricket career ==
Cottrell was a first-class cricketer and fast-medium bowler, Clement Cottrell was in the Harrow XI in 1872 and he played club cricket for many years for Esher in Surrey. He played intermittently for Middlesex between 1876 and 1885.

== Tennis career ==
He was also a notable lawn tennis player who the Championship of the Esher LTC six times between 1877 and 1882.

== Work ==
Clement Edward Cottrell worked in the London Stock Exchange as a trader.
