= Championship of the Esher LTC =

Tennis tournament in Surrey, England

Defunct tennis tournament
- Founded: 1877
- Abolished: 1883
- Editions: 7
- Location: Esher, Surrey, England
- Venue: Esher Lawn Tennis Club
- Surface: Grass

The Championship of the Esher LTC . also known as the Championship of Esher was an early Victorian period men's grass court tennis tournament founded in 1877. The championship was played at the Esher Lawn Tennis Club, Esher, Surrey, England. The championship ran annually for seven editions until 1883.

== History ==
The Esher Cricket Club was formed in 1863. The Cricket Club played on land owned by the Martineau family who lived in a large house nearby called Littleworth. In 1877 Esher Lawn Tennis Club was formed, but at this point had no permanent home themselves and instead played tournaments on the cricket grounds. The club staged the first Championship of the Esher LTC that year.

A description of the event that concluded on 12 July 1881:

The Championship of the Esher LTC held by C. E. Cotterell since it's formation, was once again won by that player on July 12th the preliminary round falling to C. Martineau. Cotterell won by 3 sets to 1.

— Lawn Tennis in 1881, Routledge's Sporting Annual (1882). p. 69.

The most successful player who won the gentleman's singles was Clement Edward Cottrell who won it six times between 1877 and 1882. The only other player to win the event was Charles Martineau who defeated Clement Cottrell in the challenge round. In 1898 Esher Tennis Club was formally established with its own home. The tennis club is still operating today.

== Notes ==
Challenge Round: the final round of a tournament, in which the winner of a single-elimination phase faces the previous year's champion, who plays only that one match. The challenge round was used in the early history of tennis (from 1877 through 1921), in some tournaments not all.

* Indicates challenger

== Sources ==
- Esher Cricket Club. Esher, Surrey, England.
- Esher Tennis Club. Esher, Surrey, England.
- Routledges Sporting Annual (1882) George Routledge and Son. London.
- The Evening Post. 20 March 1922. Dublin. Ireland.
