= Lestocq Robert Erskine =

Scottish tennis player

Robert Erskine
- Lestocq Erskine in 1906
- Full name: Lestocq Robert Erskine
- Country (sports): United Kingdom
- Born: 6 September 1857; Edinburgh, Scotland
- Died: 29 May 1916 (aged 58); Llandrindod Wells, Wales

Singles

Grand Slam singles results
- Wimbledon: F (1878)

Doubles

Grand Slam doubles results
- Wimbledon: W (1879^{Ox})

Lestocq Robert Erskine (6 September 1857 – 29 May 1916) was a Scottish tennis player who was active during the first years after the introduction of lawn tennis. He was also a Liberal politician.

== Career ==
Erskine was one of the 21 players that took part in the inaugural 1877 Wimbledon Championship singles competition. In the first round he defeated H. Wheeler in straight sets. In the second round he played against J. Lambert who became the first player in Wimbledon history to retire a match, conceding to Erskine after losing the first two sets. Erskine lost in the quarterfinal to William Marshall in three straight sets. The following year, 1878, he again entered the singles event and reached the final of the All-Comers tournament. After a win over A.W. Nicholson in the first round, a bye in the second, a win over F.W. Porter in the third round he reached the quarterfinal in which he defeated C.G. Hamilton in a five-set match. In the semifinal he won against future Wimbledon champion Herbert Lawford but lost the All-Comers final in straight sets to Frank Hadow who would defeat Spencer Gore in the Challenge round to win the title. In 1879 he was a finalist at the Grand National Lawn Tennis Tournament at Hendon, the same year was his last Wimbledon appearance when he reached the second round, after a first-round victory over F.W. Porter, in which he lost to eventual champion John Hartley.

=== Doubles ===
Erskine won the first major men's doubles tennis tournament, the Oxford University Men's Doubles Championship, in May 1879 partnering Herbert Lawford. This event was a precursor to the Wimbledon men's doubles championship, introduced in 1884, and was played over the best of seven sets ending in a score of 4–6, 6–4, 6–5, 6–2, 3–6, 5–6, 7–5. (Note: Some sources show the result of the final set as 10–8)

Year	Tournament	Partner	Opponent	Score
1879	All-England Men's Doubles championships (Oxford)	(United Kingdom) Herbert Lawford	(United Kingdom) George Ernest Tabor (United Kingdom) F. Durant	4–6, 6–4, 6–5, 6–2, 3–6, 5–6, 7–5

== Politics ==
Erskine stood for parliament at the 1906 General Election as Liberal candidate for Horsham. He came second.
