= South of Ireland Open Tennis Championship =

Tournament information
- Founded: 1876; 149 years ago
- Editions: 142 (2018)
- Location: Limerick; Ireland
- Venue: Limerick Lawn Tennis Club
- Surface: Artificial Grass, outdoors
- Website: http://www.lltc.ie/history/south of ireland championships

Current champions
- Men's singles: (Republic of Ireland) James Halas

The South of Ireland Open Tennis Championship originally called the South of Ireland Championships first established in 1876 and also known as the Limerick Cup is a grass court tennis tournament that features both men's and women's competitions that is currently an official tour event of Tennis Ireland. It is held at the Limerick Lawn Tennis Club in Limerick, County Limerick, Ireland. The championships is the world's second oldest surviving tennis tournament after Wimbledon but the only event to have been staged continuously for the last 141 years.

== History ==
A South of Ireland Championships tournament was staged in 1876, and played at the Limerick County Cricket Club, in Limerick. Records appear contradictory; the staging of this initial tournament appears to predate the founding of the Limerick LTC in 1877 by one year.

Limerick Lawn Tennis Club was first established in 1877 in Limerick, County Limerick, Ireland. The same year the club staged the first Open Championships in Ireland in August 1877 one month after the Wimbledon Championships were inaugurated, the results of that tournament were however not recorded. It was not until 1879 that the first Irish Lawn Tennis Championships were staged at the Fitzwilliam Tennis Club in Dublin. In 1877 a subsidiary tournament that played as part of the South of Ireland Championships was established called the Limerick Cricket Club Lawn Tennis Tournament or Limerick CC Lawn Tennis Tournament.

In 1878 the first South of Ireland Championships also known as the Limerick Cup were founded the men's event was won by Veere St Leger Goold. The event featured both men's and women's singles and doubles competitions and was the first notable tournament in Great Britain and Ireland to feature a woman's competition seven years before the Wimbledon Championships followed suit. In 1881 the reigning Wimbledon Champion William Renshaw and his twin brother Ernest Renshaw entered the doubles competition. Between 1884 and 1885 no women's event were staged. The 1885 and 1886 editions were won by future Wimbledon Champion Willoughby Hamilton.

Between 1911 and 1912 the championships were won by Irishman Frank Cosbie. With the advent of World War One the championships were still held from 1914 and 1919. Post war the championships were won again by Irish Lawn Tennis Championships finalist Frank Cosbie three times consecutively 1924 to 1926. The tournament was still staged during World War Two from 1939 to 1945. Post war the 1953 championships were won by American player Ellis Williamson. In 1975 the men's championships were won Michael. P. Hickey who played in 21 Davis Cup competitions as part of the Irish Team. British player Ross Matheson won the event in 1991, 1994 and 1996. Into the 2000s Brian McCarthy was probably the most successful player he won the championships in (2010,2014) and reached the finals on four occasions (2010–11, 2013–16).

The tournament was part of the pre-open era men's tennis tour from 1878 to 1967. Into the Open Era it did not survive as a tour tournament on the lucrative Grand Prix tennis circuit but did remain a fixture on the International Tennis Federation circuit for a short while until the mid-1990s. The tournament was downgraded again to regional status and continues to operate within the annual tennis tournament circuit of Tennis Ireland. The championships were staged in June 2018 which was the 141st edition of this tournament it was won by James Halas.

== Finals ==
Notes: Challenge Round: The Final round of a tournament, in which the winner of a single-elimination phase faces the previous year's champion, who plays only that one match. The challenge round was used in the early history of tennis (from 1877 through 1921) in some tournaments not all.

=== Men's singles ===
Incomplete list of past winners and results included:

Year	Champion	Runner up	Score
1876	(England) William Henry Darby	(England) Mr. W. Bruce	11-3.
1878	(Ireland) Vere St. Leger Goold	(England) William Henry Darby	6-0,6-4
1879	(Ireland) Heffernan J. F. J. Considine	(Ireland) Henry Evelyn Tombe	6-4, 6-3
1880	(England) Edward Brackenbury	(Ireland) Edward Monitford Longfield	6-4, 6-4, 6-2
1881 (Note: The 1881 to 1886 editions included a challenge round)	(England) Edward Brackenbury	(Ireland) Edward M. L. Lysaght	0-6, 6-3, 7-5, 8-6
1882	(Ireland) Edward M. L. Lysaght	(England) Edward Brackenbury	w.o.
1883	(Ireland) Eyre Chatterton	(Ireland) Edward M. L. Lysaght	6-1 6-0 6-0
1884	(Ireland) Eyre Chatterton	(United Kingdom of Great Britain and Ireland) William Henry Darby	6=0 6-4
1885	(Ireland) Willoughby J. Hamilton	(Ireland) Eyre Chatterton	6-4, 12-10, 6-0
1886	(Ireland) Willoughby J. Hamilton	(United Kingdom of Great Britain and Ireland) Thomas Harrison Griffiths	6-3, 6-1, 6-2
1896	(Ireland) Captain Bredin	(Scotland) E.J.L. Golding	6-3, 6-3
1897	(Ireland) J. Hirst	?	?
1898	(United States) Jahial Parmly Paret	(Ireland) J. Hirst	2 to 0 sets
1899	(Ireland) E.P. Graham	(Ireland) J. Hirst	2 to 0 sets
1900	(Ireland) William Perrott	(Ireland) E.P. Graham	6-1, 6-3, 9-7
1901	(Ireland) William Perrott	(Ireland) Robert Malcolm Graham	3 sets to 0
1902	(Ireland) Maurice Fitzmaurice Day	(Ireland) William Perrott	1-6, 6-1, 4-6, 8-6, 6-2
1904	(United Kingdom of Great Britain and Ireland) J.S. Talbot	(United Kingdom of Great Britain and Ireland) L. Tennis	w.o.
1909	(Ireland) Sydney Lawrence Fry	(Ireland) T.M. O'Callaghan	6-0, 6-3, 6-4
1910	Championships were held		
1911	(United Kingdom of Great Britain and Ireland) Frank Cosbie	?	?
1912	(United Kingdom of Great Britain and Ireland) Frank Cosbie	?	?
1914–1923	Championships were held		
1924	(Republic of Ireland) Frank Cosbie	?	?
1925	(Republic of Ireland) Frank Cosbie	?	?
1926	(Republic of Ireland) Frank Cosbie	?	?
1928–1951	Championships were held		
1952	(Republic of Ireland) A. Duncan Taylor	?	?
1953	(Republic of Ireland) Tom Cleary	(Republic of Ireland) Harry Crowe	7-5, 1-6, 3-6, 6-2, 7-6
1954	(Republic of Ireland) Alan Haughton	(Republic of Ireland) Tom Cleary	6-4, 6-3
1955	(Republic of Ireland) Harry Barniville	(Republic of Ireland) Harry Crowe	6-2, 6-3
1957	(Republic of Ireland) Frank Furney	(Republic of Ireland) Alan Haughton	9-7, 6-1
1958	(United States) Ellis Williamson	(Republic of Ireland) Patrick Murphy	6-3, 6-4, 5-7, 6-4
1960	(United Kingdom of Great Britain and Ireland) Dudley Moxon	(Republic of Ireland) John O'Brien	7-9, 6-1, 6-4
1961	(United Kingdom of Great Britain and Ireland) Dudley Moxon	(Republic of Ireland) Redmond O'Hanlon	6-2, 6-3
1962	Championships were held		
1963	(Republic of Ireland) John O'Brien	(United Kingdom of Great Britain and Ireland) Dudley Moxon	6-3, 6-4
1964–1974	Championships were held		
Open era
1975	(Republic of Ireland) Michael. P. Hickey	?	?
1976	(Republic of Ireland) Michael Sleep	(Republic of Ireland) Don O'Connell	?
1978	(Republic of Ireland) Jim McCardle	(Republic of Ireland) Alan Haughton	9-7, 6-1
1981	(Republic of Ireland) Tommy Burke	(Republic of Ireland) ?	?
1982	(United States) Doug Stone	(Republic of Ireland) ?	7-9, 6-1, 6-4
1983	(Republic of Ireland) Michael Daly	(Republic of Ireland) Redmond O'Hanlon	6-2, 6-3
1984	(Republic of Ireland) Michael Daly	(Republic of Ireland) Noel Sheridan	6-1, 6-4
1985	(Republic of Ireland) Liam Croke	(Republic of Ireland) Redmond O'Hanlon	6-2, 6-3
1986	(Republic of Ireland) Michael Nugent	(Republic of Ireland) Redmond O'Hanlon	6-2, 6-3
1988	(Republic of Ireland) Peter Wright	(Republic of Ireland) Redmond O'Hanlon	6-2, 6-3
1989	(Republic of Ireland) G. Henderson	(Republic of Ireland) Redmond O'Hanlon	6-2, 6-3
1991	(United Kingdom) Ross Matheson	(Republic of Ireland) ?	?
1992	(United Kingdom) Ulli Nganga	(Republic of Ireland) ?	7-9, 6-1, 6-4
1993	(Republic of Ireland) Keir Wood	(Republic of Ireland) Redmond O'Hanlon	6-2, 6-3
1994	(United Kingdom) Ross Matheson	(Republic of Ireland) Redmond O'Hanlon	6-2, 6-3
1995	(Republic of Ireland) Owen Casey	?	?
1996	(United Kingdom) Ross Matheson	?	?
1997	(Republic of Ireland) Scott Barron	(Republic of Ireland) Owen Casey	6-2, 6-3
1998	(Republic of Ireland) Owen Casey	?	?
1999	(Republic of Ireland) Joe Greene	(Republic of Ireland) David Mullins	?
2000	(Republic of Ireland) Owen Casey	(Republic of Ireland) Steven Nugent	6-1, 6-2
2001	(Republic of Ireland) John Doran	(Republic of Ireland) Conor Niland	7-6, 4-6, 7-5
2002	(Republic of Ireland) Nicky Malone	(Republic of Ireland) Conor Niland	7-5, 6-3
2003	(Republic of Ireland) Conor Niland	(Republic of Ireland) Conor Taylor	6-2, 6-1
2004	(Republic of Ireland) Barry King	(Republic of Ireland) James McGee	?
2005	(Republic of Ireland) Kevin Rea	(Republic of Ireland) Travis McDonnagh	1-6, 6-1, 6-3
2007	(Republic of Ireland) T. Farron-Mahon	(Republic of Ireland) Daniel Glancy	6-2, 6-2
2010	(Republic of Ireland) Barry McCarthy	(Republic of Ireland) Kevin Rea	6-3, 7-6
2011	(Republic of Ireland) Paul Fitzgerald	(Republic of Ireland) Barry McCarthy	6-4, 6-7, 7-5
2012	(Republic of Ireland) Darragh Glavin	(Republic of Ireland) George McGill	6-3, 7-5
2013	(Republic of Ireland) Kevin Rea	(Republic of Ireland) Barry McCarthy	4-6, 7-5, 7-5
2014	(Republic of Ireland) Barry McCarthy	(Republic of Ireland) George McGill	6-4, 6-4
2015	(Republic of Ireland) Frank O'Keefe	(Republic of Ireland) Niall Casey	6-1, 6-4
2016	(Republic of Ireland) C. J. Kelly	(Republic of Ireland) Barry McCarthy	6-1, 6-4
2017	?	?	?
2018	(Republic of Ireland) James Halas	(Republic of Ireland) Andrew Jones	7-5, 6-1

== Other tournaments ==
=== Limerick CC Tournament ===
The Limerick Cricket Club Lawn Tennis Tournament was founded in 1877 and was played along with the South of Ireland Championships until 1883

Men's singles

(Incomplete roll)

Year	Champions	Runners-up	Score
1880	(England) Edmond Bennet Brackenbury	(Ireland) Edward M. L. Lysaght	6-4, 6-4, 6-2
1883	(Ireland) Ernest Browne	(Ireland) William E. Dawson	6-3, 6-2, 6-5

== Venue ==
The Limerick Lawn Tennis Club currently operates 12 artificial (synthetic) grass turf outdoor tennis courts and 3 squash courts.

== Sources ==
- "Abolition of Challenge Rounds". paperspast.natlib.govt.nz. EVENING POST, VOLUME CIII, ISSUE 65, 20 MARCH 1922.
- "History - Limerick Lawn Tennis Club". www.lltc.ie. Limerick, Ireland: Limerick Lawn Tennis Club. 2013.
- Nieuwland, Alex (2017). "Tournament – South of Ireland Championships - Limerick Cup". www.tennisarchives.com. Harlingen, Netherlands: Idzznew BV. Retrieved.
- Tennis Ireland, (2011). "Senior South of Ireland 2011 - General". ti.tournamentsoftware.com. Tennis Ireland.
- Tennis Ireland, (2013) "Senior South of Ireland Open Tennis Championship 2013 - Organization". ti.tournamentsoftware.com. Tennis Ireland.
- Tennis Ireland, (2014). "Senior South of Ireland Open Tennis Championship 2014 - Organization". ti.tournamentsoftware.com. Tennis Ireland.
- Tennis Ireland, (2015). "138th South Of Ireland Open Tennis Championships - Organization". ti.tournamentsoftware.com. Tennis Ireland.
- Tennis Ireland, (2018). - "Hartmann Optometrists 141st South of Ireland Tennis Championships 2018"- "Organization". ti.tournamentsoftware.com. Official lawn Tennis Governing Body of Ireland.
- SOI Winners 1878 to 2016. Limerick LTC.
- "South of Ireland Championships". (1883). The Freeman's Journal. Dublin, Ireland: newspapers.com.
- https://ti.tournamentsoftware.com/Tennis Ireland:Clubs:Tournaments of Limerick Lawn Tennis
