= Frank Hadow =

British tennis player

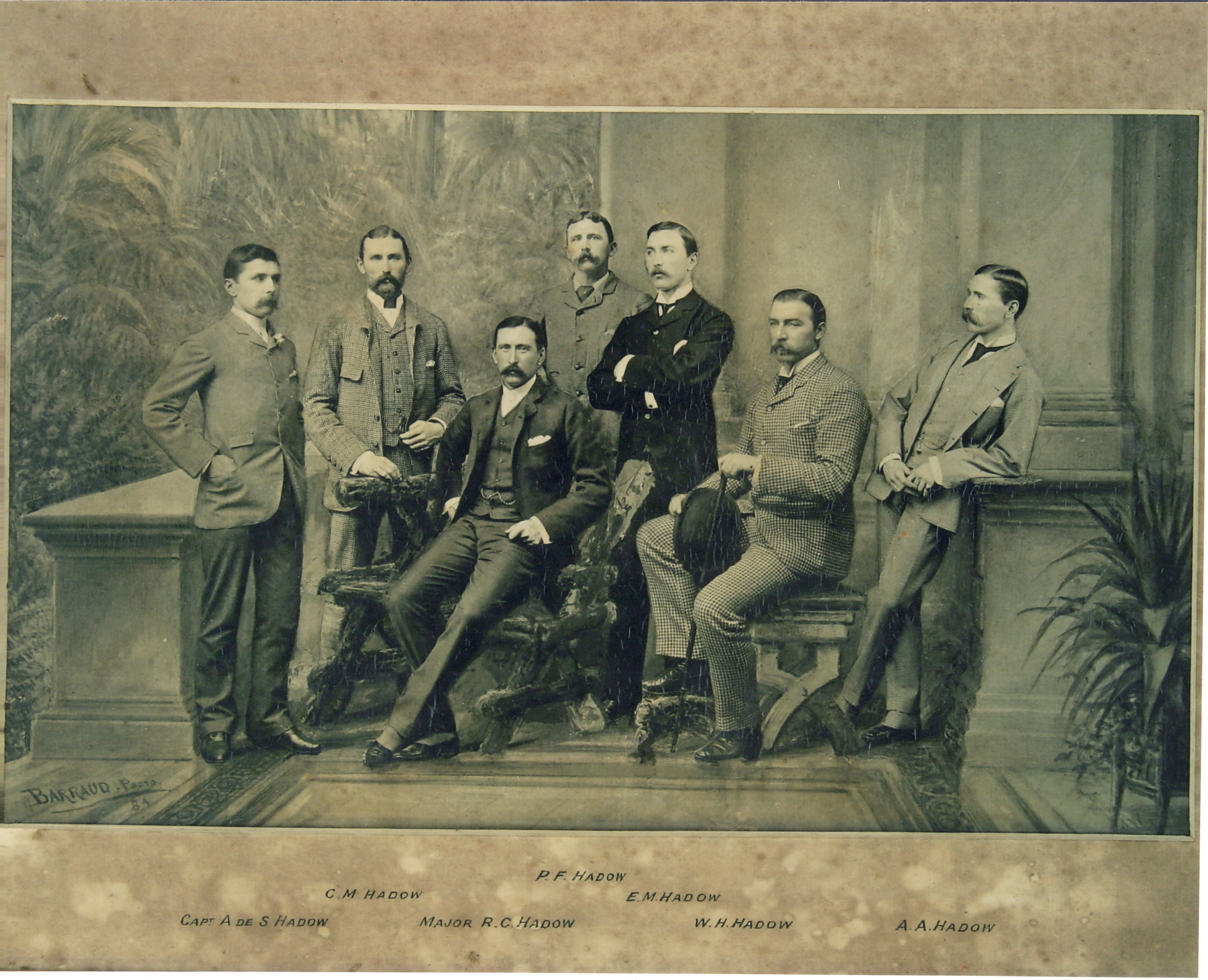
- The Harrow Hadows, P.F. Hadow in centre. (Hadow family collection)
- Full name: Patrick Francis Hadow
- Country (sports): United Kingdom
- Born: 2 January 1855 Regent's Park, Middlesex, England
- Died: 29 June 1946 (aged 91) Bridgwater, Somerset, England
- Turned pro: 1878 (amateur tour)
- Retired: 1878

Singles
- Career record: 6–0 (100%)
- Career titles: 1
- Highest ranking: 1st (1878)

Grand Slam singles results
- Wimbledon: W (1878)

Patrick Francis "Frank" Hadow (2 January 1855 – 29 June 1946) was an English tennis player, who won the Wimbledon championship in 1878.

== Personal life ==
Born 2 January 1855 Regent's Park, his father was Patrick Douglas Hadow who was educated at Harrow School and Balliol College Oxford University and became Chairman of P&O.

Frank Hadow attended Harrow School along with six of his seven brothers who were known as the "Harrow Hadows". Hadow represented Harrow at rackets and the brothers were well known as distinguished cricketers. Hadow's oldest brother Douglas Robert Hadow died during the descent after the first ascent of the Matterhorn in 1865.

== Sporting career ==
He was the loftiest Wimbledon Champion. He played at Wimbledon whilst on holiday from his coffee plantation in Ceylon. He did not defend his title – and is therefore the only male champion never to have lost a set in singles there. He returned to Wimbledon nearly half a century later to collect a commemorative medal from Queen Mary for being the oldest surviving champion.

When asked if he would defend his title Hadow is reported to have said "No sir. It's a sissy's game played with a soft ball."

Hadow was also a distinguished big game hunter, hunting in Africa in the early years of the 20th century. He has listings in many categories of the 1928 Rowland Ward "Records of Big Game", including ranking trophies in the sable antelope, Cape buffalo, Uganda kob and eland categories.

As a cricketer, he also represented Marylebone Cricket Club (MCC), Middlesex, the Orleans Club, the South and the Gentlemen of England as a right-handed batsman in seven first-class matches between 1883 and 1891. He also played cricket in Ceylon.

He died on 29 June 1946 in Bridgwater, Somerset.

== Creator of the lob ==
Hadow introduced the tennis technique of lobbing—sending the ball high and deep into the opponent's court—and used it to defeat the volleyer Spencer Gore in the 1878 (second) Wimbledon Men's Final, 7–5, 6–1, 9–7.

== Grand Slam tournaments ==
=== Singles: 1 (1 title) ===
| Result | Date | Tournament | Surface | Opponent | Score |
|---|---|---|---|---|---|
| Win | 1878 | Wimbledon | Grass | (United Kingdom) Spencer Gore | 7–5, 6–1, 9–7 |
