= All Ireland Lawn Tennis Championships =

Defunct tennis tournament
- Founded: 1876
- Abolished: 1878
- Editions: 3
- Location: Champion Ground, Lansdowne, Dublin, Ireland
- Venue: Irish Champion Athletic Club
- Surface: Grass

The All Ireland Lawn Tennis Championships. or simply called The Irish Championships was a Victorian period combined men's and women's grass court tennis tournament first staged July 1876. This event was organised by the All Ireland Lawn Tennis Club that was under auspices of the Irish Champion Athletic Club (I.C.A.C.). The tournament was held at Champion Ground, Lansdowne, Dublin, Ireland. The championships ended around 1878.

This event is notable as being the first national Irish Championships for lawn tennis predating the 1879 inaugural championships later organsised by the Fitzwilliam Lawn Tennis Club.

== History ==
The Irish Champion Athletic Club was founded in 1872 by local engineer and keen sportsman Henry Dunlop. It was conceived as more than simply a club for athletics and other sports, but also a federation of existing clubs. On 7 July 1873 the ICAC held its first 'Championships of All Ireland' meeting at College Park, Trinity College Dublin.

However, Trinity College complained about the lack of consultation, and refused permission for any further ICAC events, this lead Dunlop to seek a new location to stage future championships. In December 1873 he found an 8.5-acre site close to Lansdowne Road station owned by George Herbert, 13th Earl of Pembroke and agreed a lease with him.

In 1875 Dunlop founded the All Ireland Lawn Tennis Club under the ICAC auspices at Landsdowne, Dublin, Ireland. In July 1876 at the fourth meeting of Championships of All Ireland the first Irish Championships for men and women was held. Predating the Fitzwilliam club Irish Championships. The men's singles was won by Mr. W. Peebles who beat Mr J. Forster, the women's singles was won by Miss W Casey who defeated Miss Vance.

By 1877 the ICAC was parent to seven affiliated clubs: cricket, football, archery, croquet, tennis, lacrosse and cycling. In 1879 the Fitzwilliam Lawn Tennis Club was established and staged its first Irish Lawn Tennis Championships. In 1880 the All Ireland Lawn Tennis Club changed its name to the Lansdowne Lawn Tennis Club.

== Venue ==
The Irish Champion Athletic Club was an 8.5-acre sports complex comprising a 586-yard cinder athletic running track, enclosing cricket and archery grounds, croquet and football pitches and a lawn tennis courts.

== Sources ==
- Cox, Horace (1877). The Archer's Register. Field and Queen. Shrewsbury.
- History of Club.lansdowneltc.com. Dublin, Ireland: Lansdowne LTC. Retrieved 3 December 2022.
- Huggins, Mike (17 December 2004). The Victorians and Sport. London: A&C Black. ISBN 978-1-85285-415-7.
- Illustrated Sporting and Dramatic News (Saturday 22 July 1876). The annual tournament of Archery, Croquet, and Tennis (I.L.A.C.). London. England. p. 43
- King, Billie Jean (1988). We have come a long way : the story of women's tennis. New York: McGraw-Hill. p. 5. ISBN 9780070346253.
- O'Riordan, Turlough. (2015). "Dunlop, Henry Wallace Doveton". www.dib.ie. Dublin, Ireland: Dictionary of Irish Biography. Retrieved 3 December 2022.
- Rouse, Paul (2015). Sport and Ireland: a history. Oxford: Oxford University Press. ISBN 9780198745907.
